= Omar Rodríguez-López discography =

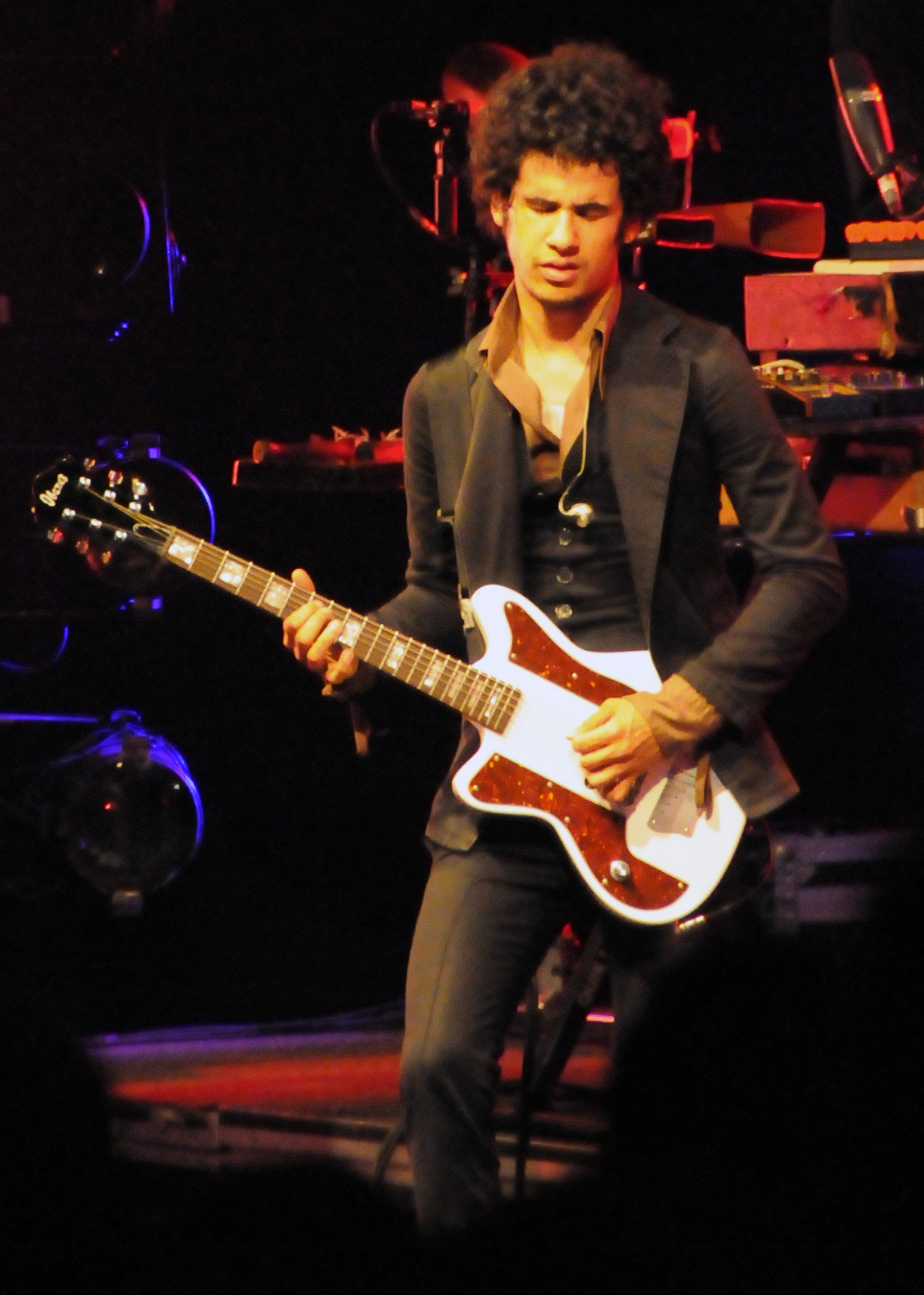
- Rodríguez-López at the Latitude festival 2008
- Studio albums: 49
- Extended plays: 3
- Live albums: 2
- Compilation albums: 1
- Singles: 2
- Music videos: 5
- Producer: 55

Omar Rodríguez-López is a multi-instrumentalist, songwriter, producer, actor and director, who is best known for his roles as band leader of The Mars Volta and guitarist for At the Drive-In. He is also the former bassist of the dub outfit De Facto, punk band Le Butcherettes (for which he also serves as producer), and finally, an active member of Bosnian Rainbows, Antemasque, and Crystal Fairy. Omar has released an eclectic catalogue of music as a solo musician and has collaborated with a diverse range of artists and bands, such as El-P, Faust, John Frusciante, Lydia Lunch, Red Hot Chili Peppers and Damo Suzuki.

This article represents the complete body of work released by Omar Rodríguez-López as a solo musician and record producer.

== Albums ==
=== Studio albums ===
==== As Omar Rodriguez Lopez ====
Year	Album details	Peak chart positions
Year	Album details	US Heat.
2004	A Manual Dexterity: Soundtrack Volume One: Released: August 31, 2004; Label: GSL; Format: CD, download, LP	—
2005	Omar Rodriguez: Released: December 5, 2005; Label: GSL; Format: CD, download, LP	—
2007	Se Dice Bisonte, No Búfalo: Released: May 29, 2007; Label: GSL; Format: CD, download, LP	40
2007	The Apocalypse Inside of an Orange: Released: November 20, 2007; Label: GSL; Format: CD, download, LP	—
2007	Calibration (Is Pushing Luck and Key Too Far): Released: December 15, 2007; Label: N2O; Format: CD, download, LP	29
2008	Absence Makes the Heart Grow Fungus: Released: September 19, 2008; Label: Infrasonic Sound; Format: CD, download, LP, USB	—
2008	Minor Cuts and Scrapes in the Bushes Ahead: Released: September 19, 2008; Label: Willie Anderson Recordings; Format: CD, download, LP	—
2008	Old Money: Released: November 10, 2008; Label: Stones Throw; Format: CD, download, LP	—
2009	Megaritual: Released: January 26, 2009; Label: Willie Anderson Recordings; Format: CD, download, LP	—
2009	Despair: Released: January 26, 2009; Label: Willie Anderson Recordings; Format: CD, download, LP	—
2009	Cryptomnesia: Released: May 5, 2009; Label: Rodriguez Lopez Productions; Format: CD, download, LP	33
2009	Xenophanes: Released: September 28, 2009; Label: Rodriguez Lopez Productions; Format: CD, download, LP	—
2009	Solar Gambling: Released: December 1, 2009; Label: Rodriguez Lopez Productions; Format: Download, LP	—
2010	Tychozorente: Released: September 14, 2010; Label: Rodriguez Lopez Productions; Format: CD, download, LP	—
2010	Cizaña de los Amores: Released: October 11, 2010; Label: Rodriguez Lopez Productions; Format: CD, download, LP	—
2010	Mantra Hiroshima: Released: November 29, 2010; Label: Rodriguez Lopez Productions; Format: CD, download	—
2010	Un Escorpión Perfumado: Released: December 20, 2010; Label: Rodriguez Lopez Productions; Format: CD, download, LP	—
2012	Un Corazón de Nadie: Released: May 17, 2012; Label: Rodriguez-Lopez Productions; Format: CD, download	—
2012	Saber, Querer, Osar y Callar: Released: June 20, 2012; Label: Rodriguez-Lopez Productions; Format: CD, download	—
2012	Octopus Kool Aid: Released: July 24, 2012; Label: Rodriguez-Lopez Productions; Format: CD, LP, download	—
2013	Equinox: Released: January 1, 2013; Label: Rodriguez-Lopez Productions; Format: Download	—
2013	Woman Gives Birth to Tomato!: Released: January 1, 2013; Label: Rodriguez Lopez Productions; Format: Download	—
2013	Unicorn Skeleton Mask: Released: January 2, 2013; Label: Rodriguez-Lopez Productions; Format: Download	—
2013	¿Sólo Extraño?: Released: March 8, 2013; Label: Rodriguez-Lopez Productions; Format: Download	—
2016	Sworn Virgins: Released: July 15, 2016; Label: Ipecac / ORL Projects; Format: Download	—
2016	Corazones: Released: July 29, 2016; Label: Ipecac / ORL Projects; Format: Download	—
2016	Blind Worms, Pious Swine: Released: August 12, 2016; Label: Ipecac / ORL Projects; Format: Download	—
2016	Arañas en la Sombra: Released: August 26, 2016; Label: Ipecac / ORL Projects; Format: Download	—
2016	Umbrella Mistress: Released: September 9, 2016; Label: Ipecac / ORL Projects; Format: Download	—
2016	El Bien y Mal Nos Une: Released: September 23, 2016; Label: Ipecac / ORL Projects; Format: Download	—
2016	Cell Phone Bikini: Released: October 7, 2016; Label: Ipecac / ORL Projects; Format: Download	—
2016	Infinity Drips: Released: October 21, 2016; Label: Ipecac / ORL Projects; Format: Download	—
2016	Weekly Mansions: Released: November 4, 2016; Label: Ipecac / ORL Projects; Format: Download	—
2016	Zapopan: Released: November 18, 2016; Label: Ipecac / ORL Projects; Format: Download	—
2016	Nom de Guerre Cabal: Released: December 2, 2016; Label: Ipecac / ORL Projects; Format: Download	—
2016	Some Need It Lonely: Released: December 16, 2016; Label: Ipecac / ORL Projects; Format: Download	—
2016	A Lovejoy: Released: December 30, 2016; Label: Ipecac / ORL Projects; Format: Download	—
2017	Roman Lips: Released: January 13, 2017; Label: Ipecac / ORL Projects; Format: Download	—
2017	Zen Thrills: Released: January 27, 2017; Label: Ipecac / ORL Projects; Format: Download	—
2017	Chocolate Tumor Hormone Parade: Released: February 10, 2017; Label: Ipecac / ORL Projects; Format: Download	—
2017	Ensayo de un Desaparecido: Released: February 24, 2017; Label: Ipecac / ORL Projects; Format: Download	—
2017	Azul, Mis Dientes: Released: March 10, 2017; Label: Ipecac / ORL Projects; Format: Download	—
2017	Gorilla Preacher Cartel: Released: March 24, 2017; Label: Ipecac / ORL Projects; Format: Download	—
2017	Killing Tingled Lifting Retreats: Released: April 7, 2017; Label: Ipecac / ORL Projects; Format: Download	—
2017	Solid State Mercenaries: Released: April 21, 2017; Label: Ipecac / ORL Projects; Format: Download	—
2017	Birth of a Ghost: Released: May 5, 2017; Label: Ipecac / ORL Projects; Format: Download	—
2017	Doom Patrol: Released: July 14, 2017; Label: Ipecac / ORL Projects; Format: Download	—
2020	The Clouds Hill Tapes Parts I, II & III: Released: July 24, 2020; Label: Clouds Hill; Format: 3LP	—
2023	Is It the Clouds?: Released: December 1, 2023; Label: Clouds Hill; Format: LP, download	—
"—" denotes a release that did not chart.

==== As Omar Rodriguez Lopez Quartet ====
Year	Album details
2010	Sepulcros de Miel: Released: May 30, 2010; Label: Sargent House, Rodriguez Lopez Productions; Format: Download, LP

==== As El Grupo Nuevo de Omar Rodriguez Lopez ====
Year	Album details	Peak chart positions
Year	Album details	US Heat.
2009	Cryptomnesia: Released: May 5, 2009; Label: Rodriguez Lopez Productions; Format: CD, download, LP	33

==== As El Trío de Omar Rodriguez Lopez ====
Year	Album details
2010	Ciencia de los Inútiles: Released: February 14, 2010; Label: Rodriguez Lopez Productions; Format: Download, LP

==== As Omar Rodriguez Lopez & John Frusciante ====
Year	Album details
2010	Omar Rodriguez Lopez & John Frusciante: Released: April 30, 2010; Label: Rodriguez Lopez Productions; Format: CD, download, LP

==== As Omar Rodriguez Lopez & Jeremy Michael Ward ====
Year	Album details
2008	Omar Rodriguez Lopez & Jeremy Michael Ward: Released: June 10, 2008; Label: Infrasonic Sound; Format: CD, download, LP

=== Live albums ===
==== As Omar Rodriguez Lopez Group ====
Year	Album details
2009	Los Sueños de un Hígado: Released: September 27, 2009; Label: Rodriguez-Lopez Productions; Format: Download, LP
2010	Dōitashimashite: Released: November 30, 2010; Label: Rodriguez-Lopez Productions; Format: Download, CD
2024	Live At Clouds Hill: Released January 19, 2024 / May 21, 2026; Label: Clouds Hill; Format: LP, streaming

=== Compilation albums ===
==== As Omar Rodriguez Lopez ====
Year	Album details
2011	Telesterion: Released: April 16, 2011; Label: Rodriguez Lopez Productions; Format: CD, download, LP

=== Box sets ===
==== As Omar Rodríguez-López ====
Title	Details
Amor de Frances	Released: December 4, 2023; Label: Clouds Hill (CH #283); Format: LP box set

== Extended plays ==
=== As Omar Rodriguez-Lopez & Damo Suzuki ===
Year	Album details
2006	Please Heat This Eventually: Released: December 2006 / January 23, 2007; Label: GSL; Format: Download, 12" vinyl

=== As Omar Rodriguez Lopez & Lydia Lunch ===
Year	Album details
2007	Omar Rodriguez Lopez & Lydia Lunch: Released: October 8, 2007; Label: Willie Anderson Recordings; Format: CD, download, LP

=== As Faust & Omar Rodriguez Lopez ===
Year	Album details
2012	This Is Not Music, This Is Not Us and We Are Not Here: Released: December 14, 2012 / November 8, 2013, single vinyl reissue; Label: Clouds Hill; Format: 10" vinyl

=== As Kimono Kult ===
Year	Album details
2014	Hiding in the Light: Released: March 4, 2014; Label: Neurotic Yell Records; Format: Download

== Singles ==
=== As Nadie ===
Year	Title	Album
2014	"Winter's Gone"	Non-album single

=== As Omar Rodriguez Lopez & John Frusciante ===
Year	Title	Album
2005	"0=2" "0"	The Special 12 Singles Series, Omar Rodriguez-Lopez & John Frusciante

== Other appearances ==
Year	Album	With	Comment
1991	Can't Change Me	Startled Calf	Provides lead vocals
1992	I Love Being Trendy	Startled Calf	Provides lead vocals
1993	Things You Can Do With A 20 Dollar Bill...	Jerk	Vocals and guitar
1994	Punk Soccer	Food Plaza	
2002	Rise Above: 24 Black Flag Songs to Benefit the West Memphis Three	Rollins Band	By various artists (Produced by Henry Rollins)
2004	Shadows Collide with People	John Frusciante	Performs slide guitar on "Chances," "23 Go in to End"
Inside of Emptiness	John Frusciante	Lead Guitar on "666".	
2005	Curtains	John Frusciante	Lead guitar on "Lever Pulled", joined lead guitar with John on "Anne"
2005	Radio Vago	Radio Vago	The album was also produced by Omar Rodriguez
2005	The Phantom Syndrome	Coaxial	
2005	The Special 12 Singles Series	Alavaz Relxib Cirdec	Wrote guitar and chorus section on "Private Booths". Co-wrote "Sapta Loka".
2006	Stadium Arcadium	Red Hot Chili Peppers	Guitar solo on "Especially in Michigan".
2007	I'll Sleep When You're Dead	El-P	Also features Cedric Bixler-Zavala and Isaiah "Ikey" Owens of The Mars Volta.
2008	New Amerykah Part One (4th World War)	Erykah Badu	Appears on "Twinkle".
2008	The Burning Plain	Hans Zimmer	A collaboration between Omar Rodríguez-López and Hans Zimmer for the film The Burning Plain. The soundtrack was used in the film only and remains unreleased in any other format.
2009	Leslie White	Taka-Takaz	Guitars on "Y sono la flauta" and "Por casualidad".
2009	Terra Incognita	Juliette Lewis	Producer, Guitar, Bass, Organ (Rhodes).
2010	Sympathy for Delicious OST	Burnt the Diphthongs	Wrote and performed on the following songs for fictional band, Burnt the Diphthongs: "Playing for Nina", "Mark's Master" and "The Healing Song".
2010	Negativa	Hour of the Monarchy	
2010	Entren Los Que Quieran	Calle 13	Appears on the track entitled "Calma Pueblo".
2011	The Golden Age of Knowhere	Funeral Party	Provides guitar solo on "Car Wars".
2014	Tercer Solar	Apolo	Featured on the track entitled "Siddhartha".
2016	¿De Qué Sivre la Resistencia?	Yokozuna	Features Omar Rodríguez-López and Le Butcherettes.
2017	Residente	Residente	Provides guitars

== As producer ==
Year	Album	For	Comment
1997	El Gran Orgo	At the Drive-In	Co-produced with Bryan Jones and other members of At the Drive-In.
2000	Sunshine / At the Drive-In	At the Drive-In	Co-produced "Extracurricular" and "Autorelocater" with the other members of At the Drive-In.
2003	De-Loused in the Comatorium	The Mars Volta	Co-produced with Rick Rubin.
2003	Live	The Mars Volta	Co-produced with Cedric Bixler-Zavala.
2004	A Manual Dexterity: Soundtrack Volume 1	Omar A. Rodriguez-Lopez	Recorded in 2001.
2005	Frances the Mute	The Mars Volta	Recorded between July and October 2004 at Avatar Studios, New York.
2005	Scabdates	The Mars Volta	Recorded between May 2004 and May 2005, at various live performances
2005	Omar Rodriguez	Omar Rodriguez Lopez Quintet	Recorded in June 2005. First release in the "Amsterdam Series".
2005	Radio Vago	Radio Vago	This was the only album to be released by the band.
2006	Amputechture	The Mars Volta	Recorded between November 2005 and May 2006 in Los Angeles, California, El Paso, Texas and Melbourne, Australia.
2006	Please Heat This Eventually	Omar Rodriguez-Lopez & Damo Suzuki	Live segments recorded November 14, 2005, in Cologne, Germany.
2007	Se Dice Bisonte, No Búfalo	Omar Rodriguez Lopez	Recorded in November 2005. Second release in the "Amsterdam Series".
2007	Omar Rodriguez Lopez & Lydia Lunch	Omar Rodriguez Lopez & Lydia Lunch	
2007	The Apocalypse Inside of an Orange	Omar Rodriguez Lopez Quintet	Recorded in 2005. Third release in the "Amsterdam Series".
2007	Calibration (Is Pushing Luck and Key Too Far)	Omar Rodriguez Lopez	Recorded in 2005. Fourth release in the "Amsterdam Series".
2008	The Bedlam in Goliath	The Mars Volta	Recorded between 2006 and 2007 at Ocean Way Recording, Hollywood, California and Rodriguez-Lopez's home studio in Brooklyn, New York.
2008	Omar Rodriguez Lopez & Jeremy Michael Ward	Omar Rodriguez Lopez & Jeremy Michael Ward	Recorded in May 2001.
2008	Absence Makes the Heart Grow Fungus	Omar Rodriguez Lopez	Recorded in 2001.
2008	Minor Cuts and Scrapes in the Bushes Ahead	Omar Rodriguez Lopez	Recorded between 2001 and 2002.
2008	Old Money	Omar Rodriguez Lopez	Recorded between 2005 and 2006.
2009	Megaritual	Omar Rodriguez Lopez	Recorded in 2006. Fifth and final release in the "Amsterdam Series".
2009	Despair	Omar Rodriguez Lopez	Recorded in 2007.
2009	Cryptomnesia	El Grupo Nuevo de Omar Rodriguez Lopez	This is the first of three albums by the band.
2009	Octahedron	The Mars Volta	Recorded in August 2008 at 99 Sutton Street in Brooklyn, New York.
2009	Terra Incognita	Juliette and The New Romantiques	Also plays guitar, bass and organ (Rhodes) on this album.
2009	Los Sueños de un Hígado	Omar Rodriguez Lopez Group	Recorded on March 11, 2009.
2009	Xenophanes	Omar Rodriguez Lopez	Recorded in December 2008.
2009	Solar Gambling	Omar Rodriguez Lopez	Recorded in 2009.
2010	Ciencia de los Inútiles	El Trío de Omar Rodriguez Lopez	
2010	Omar Rodriguez Lopez & John Frusciante	Omar Rodriguez Lopez & John Frusciante	Recorded in the spring of 2003.
2010	Sepulcros de Miel	Omar Rodriguez Lopez Quartet	Recorded in 2006.
2010	Tychozorente	Omar Rodriguez Lopez	Co-produced with Elvin Estela.
2010	Cizaña de los Amores	Omar Rodriguez Lopez	
2010	Mantra Hiroshima	Omar Rodriguez Lopez	
2010	Dōitashimashite	Omar Rodriguez Lopez Group	Recorded on September 13,14,17,18, 2010.
2010	Un Escorpión Perfumado	Omar Rodriguez Lopez	
2011	Telesterion	Omar Rodriguez Lopez	Compilation album.
2011	Sin Sin Sin	Le Butcherettes	Provides bass guitar in addition to producing the album.
2012	Noctourniquet	The Mars Volta	
2012	Un Corazón de Nadie	Omar Rodriguez Lopez	
2012	Saber, Querer, Osar y Callar	Omar Rodriguez Lopez	
2012	Octopus Kool Aid	Omar Rodriguez Lopez	
2013	Equinox	Omar Rodriguez Lopez	
2013	Woman Gives Birth to Tomato!	Omar Rodriguez Lopez Group	
2013	Unicorn Skeleton Mask	Omar Rodriguez Lopez	
2013	¿Sólo Extraño?	Omar Rodriguez Lopez	
2014	Cry Is for the Flies	Le Butcherettes	Provides bass guitar in addition to producing the album.
2015	Guardian	Apolo	
2015	A Raw Youth	Le Butcherettes	

== Videography ==
=== Music videos ===
Year	Title	For	Director
2008	"Calibration"	Omar Rodriguez Lopez	Omar Rodriguez Lopez
2009	"Asco Que Conmueve los Puntos Erógenos"	Omar Rodriguez Lopez	Omar Rodriguez Lopez
2010	"Miercoles"	El Trío de Omar Rodriguez Lopez	Omar Rodriguez Lopez
2010	"Polaridad"	Omar Rodriguez Lopez	Omar Rodriguez Lopez
2010	"Agua Dulce De Pulpo"	Omar Rodriguez Lopez	Omar Rodriguez Lopez

== Rodriguez Lopez Productions catalog ==
RLP001 Cryptomnesia
RLP002 Our Delicate Stranded Nightmare (by Zechs Marquise)
RLP003 Xenophanes
RLP004 Solar Gambling
RLP005 Los Sueños de un Hígado
RLP006 Ciencia de los Inútiles
RLP007 Sepulcros de Miel
RLP008 Octahedron (by The Mars Volta) - vinyl only
RLP009 Omar Rodriguez-Lopez & John Frusciante
RLP010 Un Escorpión Perfumado
RLP011 N/A
RLP012 Sin Sin Sin (by Le Butcherettes)
RLP013 Cizaña de los Amores
RLP014 Tychozorente
RLP015 N/A
RLP016 N/A
RLP017 N/A
RLP018 Mantra Hiroshima
RLP019 Dōitashimashite
RLP020 N/A
RLP021 Telesterion
RLP022 N/A
RLP023 Getting Paid (by Zechs Marquise)
RLP024 Before Gardens After Gardens (by Big Sir)
RLP025 Noctourniquet (by The Mars Volta) - vinyl only
RLP026 Un Corazón de Nadie
RLP027 Octopus Kool Aid
RLP028 Saber, Querer, Osar y Callar
RLP029 Touch but Don't Look (by Deantoni Parks)
RLP030 The Sentimental Engine Slayer

== See also ==
- Antemasque discography
- At the Drive-In discography
- Bosnian Rainbows discography
- De Facto discography
- Le Butcherettes discography
- The Mars Volta discography
- Omar Rodríguez-López filmography
