= Omar Rodríguez-López filmography =

Omar Rodríguez-López is a multi-instrumentalist, songwriter, producer, actor and director, who is best known for his roles as band leader of The Mars Volta and guitarist for At the Drive-In.

This article details the contributions made by Omar Rodríguez-López to film as either an actor, composer, director or producer.

== Filmography ==
Year	Film	Functioned as						Notes
Year	Film	Director	Producer	Writer	Music	Actor	Role	Notes
2007	El Búfalo de la Noche				Yes			
2008	The Burning Plain				Yes			With Hans Zimmer
2009	All Tomorrow's Parties					Yes	Himself	Brief appearance performing with The Mars Volta
2010	The Sentimental Engine Slayer	Yes	Yes	Yes	Yes	Yes	Barlam	
2010	Sympathy for Delicious				Yes			
2012	Los Chidos	Yes	Yes	Yes				

== Music videos ==
Year	Title	For	Director
1999	"Metronome Arthritis"	At the Drive-In	Dan Tierney, At the Drive-In
2000	"One Armed Scissor"	At the Drive-In	At the Drive-In
2000	"Invalid Litter Dept."	At the Drive-In	Tony Hajjar, Paul Hinojos
2003	"Son et Lumière/Inertiatic ESP"	The Mars Volta	Omar Rodríguez-López
2004	"Televators"	The Mars Volta	The Saline Project
2005	"The Widow"	The Mars Volta	Jim Agnew
2005	"L'Via L'Viaquez"	The Mars Volta	Omar Rodríguez-López
2007	"Wax Simulacra"	The Mars Volta	Jorge Hernandez
2008	"Aberinkula"	The Mars Volta	Omar Rodríguez-López
2008	"Goliath"	The Mars Volta	Omar Rodríguez-López
2008	"Askepios"	The Mars Volta	Omar Rodríguez-López
2008	"Ilyena"	The Mars Volta	Omar Rodríguez-López
2008	"Calibration"	Omar Rodriguez Lopez	Omar Rodríguez-López
2009	"Cotopaxi"	The Mars Volta	Omar Rodríguez-López
2009	"Since We've Been Wrong"	The Mars Volta	Omar Rodríguez-López
2009	"Asco Que Conmueve los Puntos Erógenos"	Omar Rodríguez-López	Omar Rodríguez-López
2010	"Miercoles"	El Trío de Omar Rodriguez Lopez	Omar Rodríguez-López
2010	"Polaridad"	Omar Rodríguez-López	Omar Rodríguez-López
2010	"Agua Dulce De Pulpo"	Omar Rodríguez-López	Omar Rodríguez-López
2011	"Shine Down"	Ximena Sariñana	Omar Rodríguez-López
2016	"To Kill a Chi Chi"	Omar Rodríguez-López	Omar Rodríguez-López, Adrián Blanco
2016	"Running Away"	Omar Rodríguez-López	Violeta Félix
2016	"Pineapple Face, Not Even Toad Loves You"	Omar Rodríguez-López	Omar Rodríguez-López
2016	"My Mallely"	Le Butcherettes	Omar Rodríguez-López
2016	"Baby, Come Close"	Andrea Franz	Omar Rodríguez-López

== See also ==
- Antemasque discography
- At the Drive-In discography
- Bosnian Rainbows discography
- De Facto discography
- Le Butcherettes discography
- The Mars Volta discography
- Omar Rodríguez-López discography
