= The Malkin Jewel =

Single by The Mars Volta

from the album Noctourniquet
- Released: February 14, 2012
- Recorded: 2009–2011
- Genre: Psychedelic rock, progressive rock, noise rock, punk blues
- Length: 4:42
- Label: Warner Bros.
- Songwriters: Cedric Bixler-Zavala, Omar Rodríguez-López
- Producer: Omar Rodríguez-López

The Mars Volta singles chronology
"Since We've Been Wrong" (2009)	"The Malkin Jewel" (2012)	"Blacklight Shine" (2022)

Professional ratings
Review scores
Source	Rating
Rolling Stone	3/5 stars

The Malkin Jewel is the only single from The Mars Volta's sixth studio album, Noctourniquet and was the band's last official single for a decade, before their breakup and subsequent reunion and release of Blacklight Shine on their 2022, self-titled record. It was premiered on February 13, 2012 on Triple J radio and later on BBC Radio. The same day, an interactive page featuring the song was launched on the band's official website. Official release through all digital retailers followed the next day.

The Malkin Jewel has been described as complex, layered, and unconventional among critics. It, along with several other songs from the album, was first played live in spring 2011 during the Omar Rodriguez Lopez Group tour, which has become known among the fans as a "secret TMV tour". During the live performances the song was followed by a lengthy improvisational jam known as "Broken English Jam," due to Cedric Bixler-Zavala reciting lyrics from Marianne Faithfull's song of the same name.

The band did not shoot a music video for the song; instead, a fan video contest was announced, with a winner receiving a $500 Best Buy gift card and merchandise from the band. An official, 15-minute live video featuring footage from the 2011 ORLG tour was released on June 18, 2012. Audio version of the same live performance, albeit with "Broken English Jam" part cut off, was included as a bonus track on Japanese version of Noctourniquet.

== Track listing ==
No.	Title	Length
1.	"The Malkin Jewel"	4:42

== Personnel ==
- Omar Rodríguez-López – guitars, keyboards, synths
- Cedric Bixler-Zavala – vocals, lyrics
- Juan Alderete – bass
- Deantoni Parks – drums
