= Omar Rodriguez Lopez Group =

American rock band

- Also known as: Omar Rodriguez-Lopez Quintet; Omar Rodriguez-Lopez Trio; Omar Rodriguez-Lopez Quartet
- Genres: Experimental rock, psychedelic rock, electronica, progressive rock, art rock
- Years active: 2005–2012, 2018
- Labels: Sargent House, Rodriguez Lopez Productions
- Members: Omar Rodríguez-López; Marcel Rodríguez-López; Audrey Paris Johnson; Virginia Garcia Alves; Leo Genovese
- Website: Omar Rodriguez Lopez Quintet; Omar Rodriguez-Lopez

The Omar Rodriguez Lopez Group (often referred to by its acronym ORLG) is an American experimental rock band, and the main side project of Omar Rodríguez-López. Featuring an ever-changing lineup of musicians alongside Rodriguez-Lopez, the group is most often a live entity to perform the various outlets of his solo music aside from The Mars Volta. After the dissolution of the Mars Volta in 2012, Omar completed a few more solo records until 2013 before deciding to pursue only collaborative efforts with groups At the Drive-In, Bosnian Rainbows, Antemasque, and Crystal Fairy.

== History ==
=== 2005–2009 ===
His group began as Omar Rodriguez Lopez Quintet, formed in 2005 when he toured Europe to support his self-titled solo record. The quintet included three other members of The Mars Volta: Juan Alderete, Marcel Rodriguez-Lopez and Adrián Terrazas-González as well as Money Mark of Beastie Boys fame. Omar began this group with these members within only a year or two of them joining The Mars Volta. The album features long, largely improvised instrumentals with Dutch titles. The quintet then collaborated with Damo Suzuki on a 25-minute EP titled Please Heat This Eventually, which was largely taken from a night recorded on their European tour in November 2005. The EP was released exclusively by Gold Standard Laboratories on vinyl only in December 2006, then released widely in January 2007. Another collaborative EP followed later that year, this time between the quintet and Lydia Lunch, as well as the full-length record, The Apocalypse Inside of an Orange, which was a double-album vinyl.

The quintet has been dubbed Omar Rodriguez Lopez Group since 2006, as indicated on the back cover of Please Heat This Eventually, even though they were known as the Quintet at the time of the performance. The group played a live show in 2007 at Fuji Rock Festival, Japan, and featured Cedric Bixler-Zavala and Thomas Pridgen in the group for the first time, both also of The Mars Volta. During the "Rapid Fire Tollbooth" performance, Alfredo Ortiz joined on percussion in addition to Marcel and Terrazas-González. Thomas Pridgen remained the group's drummer for the three years; he was also in The Mars Volta, replacing Marcel, who became percussionist and second keyboardist, much like his role in The Mars Volta. 2008 was the last year that Terrazas-González toured with Rodriguez-Lopez, in The Mars Volta or otherwise, after a mutual split planned for a few years. In March 2009, the group got together for another tour in Europe, this time featuring Omar's girlfriend Ximena Sariñana as the vocalist and Mark Aanderud on keyboards instead of Money Mark. In September 2009, a five-track live recording of the March 11, London concert was released digitally and on limited vinyl, titled Los Sueños de un Hígado. It featured songs from Rodriguez-Lopez's albums Se Dice Bisonte, No Búfalo, Old Money, and Solar Gambling, the last of which would be released 3 months later, with the final track remaining, "Victimas del Cielo", released in studio form on 2010's Cizaña de los Amores. Los Sueños de un Hígado follows the Damo Suzuki and Lydia Lunch collaborative EPs in being the only releases under the name Omar Rodriguez Lopez Group, two of which are essentially live recordings.

A new group, El Grupo Nuevo de Omar Rodriguez Lopez, was announced in Spring 2009, featured on the Cryptomnesia album (recorded in 2006, released in 2009). Rodriguez-Lopez also released Ciencia de los Inútiles under the entity El Trío de Omar Rodriguez Lopez. This trio comprises Omar, Ximena and double bass player Aaron Cruz Bravo. A quartet record was released digitally on May 30, 2010, including Juan, Marcel, and Red Hot Chili Peppers guitarist John Frusciante, as well as a record of simply John and Rodriguez-Lopez, released April 30, 2010. Before this, the two had done a few collaborations and live guest appearances, even releasing a single titled "0=2" on The Special 12 Singles Series as Omar A. Rodriguez-Lopez & John Frusciante in 2005 as 7" vinyl, and digitally in 2006. This was released before any of his group recordings, around the same time as Omar Rodriguez.

=== 2010–2012: Deantoni Parks joins ORLG & The Mars Volta ===
The group was scheduled to perform for the first time in the United States on May 2, 2010 at Highline Ballroom in New York, though the date was pushed back to September 17 due to "key members" not being available. It was speculated that Dave Elitch, the current drummer of The Mars Volta, would perform as part of ORLG in the future, as he had been credited as having recorded with Omar apart from The Mars Volta on his website. An official statement later confirmed former collaborator Deantoni Parks to be the drummer for the 2010 tour. He had previously performed as drummer of The Mars Volta in September/October 2006 as a temporary fill-in, and has since remained friends with the band. Lars Stalfors also joined the group on stage as sound manipulator in 2010.

Omar Rodriguez Lopez Group announced a performance at the Metamorphose Festival in Tokyo, Japan on September 4, 2010. Also added were a Chicago date the night after New York, along with two west coast dates. Further touring of Russia and Europe were then scheduled for November/December, with The Mars Volta scheduled to play two festival shows in South America in October. Meanwhile, Deantoni had also performed as part of Juan Alderete's group Vato Negro for a California date, June 17, as well as the Fuji Rock Festival in Japan in July. Omar joined his friends for the festival show, as the three were working on a Vato Negro album. During December 2010, it was slowly revealed that Deantoni had returned as drummer of The Mars Volta, and had been working with them closely throughout the year.

During 2010, Omar also released a record of older material performed along with Elvin Estela (DJ Nobody) featuring no guitars, Tychozorente, and a collection of songs featuring Ximena & Lisa Papineau as vocalists, Cizaña de los Amores. Then, as surprise digital releases concluding the Group's 2010 touring, Mantra Hiroshima, the second record to feature drumming by Zach Hill, and the appreciatively titled Dōitashimashite, the Group's second live release capturing the U.S. tour, were delivered. Next came the anticipated studio album, Un Escorpión Perfumado, including Marcel, Deantoni, and more vocals by Omar by year's end.

2011 began with another ORLG tour, starting with the performance at the Rodriguez Lopez Productions and Sargent House showcase at the SXSW Music Festival. A special guest was said to join the group on stage, which turned out to be Cedric in place of Ximena as vocalist. Most of the songs premiered during the tour turned out to be new songs of The Mars Volta, eventually released a year later on Noctourniquet. On several shows missed by Cedric due to his voice illness, the band played all instrumental material consisting mostly of the compositions which are believed to be from the upcoming Vato Negro album.

In December 2011, the Omar Rodriguez-Lopez Trio (Rodriguez-Lopez, Alderete, Parks) toured Australia, playing 7 concerts in as many days through five cities. On this tour they were supported by Le Butcherettes, with Omar Rodriguez-Lopez pulling double duty and playing bass for them. For the performance at 2012 Metamorphose Festival in Japan, the trio was joined for the first time by Teri Gender Bender, Le Butcherettes vocalist, playing three songs from then-unreleased album Octopus Kool Aid.

=== 2012: Bosnian Rainbows, hiatus during At the Drive-In & 2018 resurgence ===
A new ORLG tour was announced in summer of 2012, consisting of more than 40 dates in Europe, USA and Japan. The group line-up was originally said to be Omar Rodriguez-Lopez, Deantoni Parks and Teri Gender Bender (this time not including bassist Juan Alderete, who was present in all the previous line-ups). Just before the first show of the tour, it was revealed that the new line-up was actually a whole new band called Bosnian Rainbows, also featuring Nicci Kasper, member of Dark Angels alongside Parks, on synthesizers/keyboards. The band released their debut album, recorded live at Clouds Hill Recordings in Hambourg, in June 2013. A live album of the 2012 one-off concerts was released in 2017 as Chocolate Tumor Hormone Parade.

Along with this new live album were 22 other releases in 2016-2017 during which time Omar's attention had primarily shifted to At the Drive-In and film work. No concerts were performed in support of these bi-weekly album releases and no physical editions of the records were produced. They were largely recorded between 2008 and 2013, although a couple records contain portions dating back as far as 2001.

After a 6-year hiatus, during which time Omar was occupied with Bosnian Rainbows, Antemasque, At the Drive-In, Crystal Fairy, and his film work, an ORLG concert was announced in May 2018 for 8 de Diciembre 2018 at Festival Catrina (El Festival Más Importante De Puebla) in Puebla, México. Omar's first solo performance in 6 years was at the Clouds Hill Festival in Hamburg, Germany on November 23, during which he debuted songs from Arañas en la Sombra, Weekly Mansions, Roman Lips, and Killing Tingled Lifting Retreats, all released in 2016/2017 through the Ipecac Recordings series, as well as one unreleased song. He was joined by brother Marcel along with a female vocalist and female drummer previously unaffiliated with any of his work.

== Discographies ==
number indicates order of release
* annotates recorded in 2001, before formation of The Mars Volta
^{A#} annotates record sequence of those constituting the "Amsterdam Series," recorded whilst Omar lived there 2005-2006

=== Omar Rodriguez Lopez Group ===
- 04 Please Heat This Eventually (2006/2007)^{A EP1} [digital/vinyl only, except as Japanese bonus disc of Se Dice Bisonte, No Búfalo]
- 06 Omar Rodriguez-Lopez & Lydia Lunch (2007)^{A EP2} [strictly European release by Willie Anderson Recordings]
- 16 Los Sueños de un Hígado (2009 live release) [digital/vinyl only, limited to 1,000 copies]
- 25 Dōitashimashite (2010 live release) [digital, CD]
- 31 Woman Gives Birth to Tomato! (2013) [digital]
- 50 Chocolate Tumor Hormone Parade (2017 live release) [digital] (recorded 2012)
- 59 Live At Clouds Hill (2023 live-in-studio release)

=== El Grupo Nuevo de Omar Rodriguez Lopez ===
- 15 Cryptomnesia (2009)

=== El Trío de Omar Rodriguez Lopez ===
- 19 Ciencia de los Inútiles (2010) [digital/vinyl only, limited of 1,000 copies]

=== Omar Rodriguez Lopez Quartet ===
- 21 Sepulcros de Miel (2010) [digital/vinyl only, limited of 2,000 copies: 1,000 purple, 1,000 orange]

=== Omar Rodriguez Lopez Quintet ===
- 07 The Apocalypse Inside of an Orange (2007/2008)^{A3}

=== Other Omar Rodríguez López releases ===
(all as "Omar Rodriguez Lopez" unless otherwise noted)

- 01 A Manual Dexterity: Soundtrack Volume One (2004)* as Omar A. Rodriguez-Lopez
- 02 The Special 12 Singles Series (2005/2006) as Omar A. Rodriguez-Lopez & John Frusciante [digital/vinyl only, limited of 500 copies by GSL]
- 03 Omar Rodriguez (2005/2006)^{A1} [strictly European release except for limited of 2,000 copies picture disc by GSL in 2006]
- 05 Se Dice Bisonte, No Búfalo (2007)^{A2} [brown marble limited of 750 vinyl by GSL]
- 08 Calibration (Is Pushing Luck and Key Too Far) (2007/2008)^{A4} [grey marble limited of 750 vinyl by N20]
- 09 Omar Rodriguez-Lopez & Jeremy Michael Ward (2008)*
- 10 Absence Makes the Heart Grow Fungus (2008)*
- 11 Minor Cuts and Scrapes in the Bushes Ahead (2008)* [strictly European release]
- 12 Old Money (2008/2009)
- 13 Megaritual (2009)^{A5} [strictly European release]
- 14 Despair (2009) [strictly European release]
- 17 Xenophanes (2009) [pink limited vinyl of 2,000 USA, yellow vinyl Europe]
- 18 Solar Gambling (2009) [digital/vinyl only, limited of 1,500 copies: 750 clear blue, 750 clear yellow]
- 20 Omar Rodriguez-Lopez & John Frusciante (2010) [limited of 2,000 copies: 1,000 black, 1,000 clear red]
- 22 Tychozorente (2010) [strictly European release]
- 23 Cizaña de los Amores (2010) [strictly European release]
- 24 Mantra Hiroshima (2010) [digital, CD]
- 26 Un Escorpión Perfumado (2010) [clear red limited vinyl of 1,000]
- 27 Telesterion (2011) [4LP vinyl compilation, limited of 1,500]
- 28 Un Corazón de Nadie (2012) [digital, CD]
- 29 Saber, Querer, Osar y Callar (2012) [digital, CD]
- 30 Octopus Kool Aid (2012) [limited vinyl of 1,000]
- 32 Equinox (2013) [digital]
- 33 Unicorn Skeleton Mask (2013) [digital]
- 34 ¿Sólo Extraño? (2013) [digital]

=== Ipecac Series 2016/2017 ===
- 35 Sworn Virgins (2016)
- 36 Corazones (2016)
- 37 Blind Worms Pious Swine (2016)
- 38 Arañas en la Sombra (2016)
- 39 Umbrella Mistress (2016)
- 40 El Bien y Mal Nos Une (2016)
- 41 Cell Phone Bikini (2016)
- 42 Infinity Drips (2016)
- 43 Weekly Mansions (2016)
- 44 Zapopan (2016)
- 45 Nom de Guerre Cabal (2016)
- 46 Some Need It Lonely (2016)
- 47 A Lovejoy (2016)
- 48 Roman Lips (2017)
- 49 Zen Thrills (2017)
- 50 Chocolate Tumor Hormone Parade (2017)
- 51 Ensayo de un Desaparecido (2017)
- 52 Azul, Mis Dientes (2017)
- 53 Gorilla Preacher Cartel (2017)
- 54 Killing Tingled Lifting Retreats (2017)
- 55 Solid State Mercenaries (2017)
- 56 Birth of a Ghost (2017)
- 57 Doom Patrol (2017)

=== Clouds Hill ===
- 58 The Clouds Hill Tapes Parts I, II & III (2020)
- 60 Is It The Clouds? (2024)

== Live Group members ==
=== 2005 tour line-up (Omar Rodriguez-Lopez Quintet) ===
- Omar Rodríguez-López – guitar
- Juan Alderete de la Peña – bass
- Marcel Rodríguez-López – drums
- Adrián Terrazas-González – tenor saxophone, bass clarinet, flute, percussion
- Money Mark Ramos-Nishita – keyboards & synths
- Damo Suzuki – vocals (special guest, November 14, 2005)

=== 2007 one-off line-up ===
- Omar Rodríguez-López – guitar
- Cedric Bixler-Zavala – lead vocals
- Juan Alderete de la Peña – bass
- Marcel Rodríguez-López – percussion, keyboards & synths
- Adrián Terrazas-González – tenor saxophone, bass clarinet, flute, percussion
- Thomas Pridgen – drums
- Money Mark Ramos-Nishita – keyboards & synths
- Alfredo Ortiz – percussion (guest)

=== 2009 tour line-up ===
- Omar Rodríguez-López – guitar
- Juan Alderete de la Peña – bass
- Marcel Rodríguez-López – keyboards & synths
- Thomas Pridgen – drums
- Mark Aanderud – keyboards
- Ximena Sariñana – lead vocals

=== 2010 tour line-up ===
- Omar Rodríguez-López – guitar, vocals
- Juan Alderete de la Peña – bass
- Marcel Rodríguez-López – keyboards & synths
- Deantoni Parks – drums
- Ximena Sariñana – lead vocals
- Lars Stalfors – sound manipulation, keyboards, engineer

=== 2011 US/Mexico tour line-up (The Mars Volta) ===
- Omar Rodríguez-López – guitar, backing vocals
- Cedric Bixler-Zavala – lead vocals
- Juan Alderete de la Peña – bass
- Marcel Rodríguez-López – keyboards & synths
- Deantoni Parks – drums
- Lars Stalfors – sound manipulation, keyboards, engineer

=== 2011 Australian tour/2012 Panama one-off line-up ===
- Omar Rodríguez-López – guitar, vocals
- Juan Alderete de la Peña – bass
- Deantoni Parks – drums

=== 2012 Japanese/Spanish one-offs line-up ===
- Omar Rodríguez-López – guitar, vocals, keyboards
- Juan Alderete de la Peña – bass
- Deantoni Parks – drums
- Teri Gender Bender – vocals

=== 2012 tour line-up (Bosnian Rainbows) ===
- Omar Rodríguez-López – guitar, backing vocals, keyboards
- Teri Gender Bender – vocals
- Deantoni Parks – drums, keyboards
- Nicci Kasper – synthesizer, keyboards

=== 2018 tour line-up ===
- Omar Rodríguez-López – Guitar
- Marcel Rodríguez-López – Keyboards, Mellotron
- Audrey Johnson – Drums
- Virginia Alves – Vocals
- Leo Genovese – Piano
