= Woman Gives Birth to Tomato! =

Woman Gives Birth To Tomato!

Studio album by Omar Rodríguez-López
- Released: January 1, 2013
- Recorded: Spring 2008
- Genre: Free jazz
- Length: 44:58
- Label: Rodriguez Lopez Productions
- Producer: Omar Rodríguez-López

Omar Rodríguez-López solo chronology
Octopus Kool Aid (2012)	Woman Gives Birth To Tomato! (2013)	Equinox (2013)

Omar Rodríguez-López chronology
Noctourniquet (2012)	Woman Gives Birth To Tomato! (2013)	Bosnian Rainbows (2013)

Professional ratings
Review scores
Source	Rating
The Alternative Review	2.5/5 stars
Hipersónica	1/10
Sputnik Music	3/5 stars

Woman Gives Birth To Tomato! is the twenty-fourth studio album by Omar Rodríguez-López, released under the name Omar Rodriguez-Lopez Group. Although Rodriguez-Lopez Productions intended to release the album on December 28, 2012 (which is the date listed on the Bandcamp page), it was only made available on January 1, 2013, less than 2 hours after the release of Equinox. The album cover art had first appeared in the booklet for Rodriguez-Lopez's 2011 compilation album, Telesterion.

== Track listing ==
All of the tracks on the album are named after a city in which Rodriguez-Lopez lived at some point of his life, except "Tokyo Japan" (which consists entirely of silence).

No.	Title	Length
1.	"Bayamón, Puerto Rico"	4:09
2.	"Puebla, México"	2:09
3.	"El Paso, Texas"	15:28
4.	"Long Beach, California"	3:40
5.	"Amsterdam, Holland"	6:58
6.	"Brooklyn, New York"	2:39
7.	"Zapopan, México"	9:25
8.	"Tokyo, Japan"	0:30
Total length:		44:58

== Personnel ==
- Omar Rodríguez-López – synthesizers, sequences, guitar, production
- Adrián Terrazas-González – saxophone, bass clarinet, flute
- Aaron Cruz Bravo – double bass
- Mark Aanderud – piano, percussion
- Marcel Rodríguez-López – drums

=== Production ===
- Lars Stalfors – mixing
- Pete Lyman – mastering
- Sonny Kay – artwork and layout

== Release history ==
Region	Date	Label	Format
Worldwide	January 1, 2013	Rodriguez Lopez Productions	Digital Download
United Kingdom	December 2023	Clouds Hill	LP
