= Marcel Rodríguez-López =

Puerto Rican musician

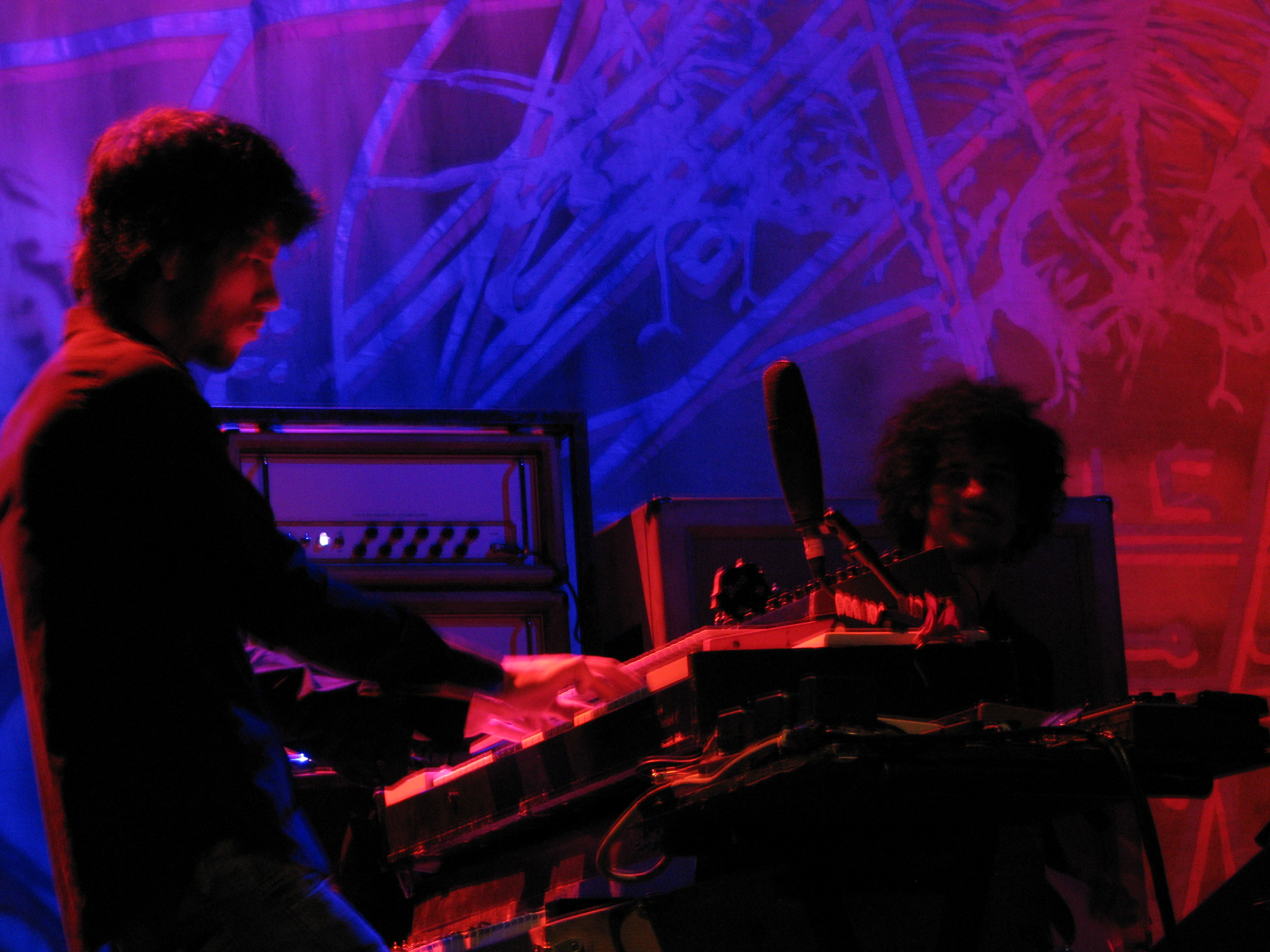
- Rodríguez-López in 2008

Background information
- Also known as: Eureka the Butcher
- Born: Marcel Rodríguez-López; September 29, 1983 (age 42); Bayamón, Puerto Rico
- Origin: El Paso, Texas, U.S.
- Genres: Progressive rock; experimental rock; psychedelic rock; electronica; salsa
- Occupations: Musician; producer
- Instruments: Keyboards; synthesizer; drums; percussion

Marcellus Rodríguez-López (born September 29, 1983) is an American multi-instrumentalist musician and younger brother of Omar Rodríguez-López. He is best known as the keyboardist and percussionist of the Mars Volta and the drummer for Zechs Marquise. He also produces electronic music under the moniker Eureka the Butcher and performed with De Facto in 2024.

== Biography ==
Marcel has been noted as to playing the bongos, congas, drums, cymbals, Maracas, keyboards and shekere.

He formerly played in the band Thieves of Always, which was led by Ralph Jasso, who was a member of The Mars Volta (led by his elder brother Omar) on tour in 2002. Marcel joined The Mars Volta mid-tour in October 2003 at Omar's request as a percussionist. Since then, he has been a consistent member of The Mars Volta and the Omar Rodriguez-Lopez Group, contributing percussion, keyboards, and synths. He was also a founding member of El Paso band Zechs Marquise, which included his brothers Marfred on bass and Rikardo on keyboards and trumpet; he initially played keyboards and percussion but switched to drums after the band's original drummer left.

Marcel also played live with the Red Hot Chili Peppers in 2006 during their North American tour (for which The Mars Volta was the support act), contributing bongos to "Hump de Bump" and congas to "Charlie". On the final night of the Amputechture / Stadium Arcadium tour, November 5, 2006, Marcel and the RHCP were joined onstage by Omar for the outro jam which went on for over 15 minutes. Marcel then appeared along with the band for the Gnarls Barkley tour, playing nearly every song of the set, starting with the Dallas show, January 13, through the Sunrise, Florida show on January 31, 2007. Marcel also played clavinet during performances of "Warlocks" which was originally played by Billy Preston on the studio recording of Stadium Arcadium.

In addition Marcel has acted in his brother Omar's film The Sentimental Engine Slayer.

Omar Rodríguez-López spoke out about the relationship with him and his brother:

Because of our age difference I didn't really get to know him because I left home at a very young age. We're eight years apart and I dropped out of school and left home when I was seventeen, so he was very small. When I finally came back to the family structure and made amends then I was always on tour. And so I got to discover my brother by inviting him into the band. It was sort of always the idea that I would bring him into the factory eventually. When I did that's how I got to know him – through being on the road and being on tour.

== Personal life ==
Rodríguez-López lives in Columbia, South Carolina.

== Discography ==
=== Solo (as Eureka the Butcher) ===
- Music for Mothers (2013)
- Foreshadowed With Shakes And Cracks (2016)
- ¡EUREKA! (2017)

=== With The Mars Volta ===
- Frances the Mute (2005)
- Scabdates (2005)
- Amputechture (2006)
- The Bedlam in Goliath (2008)
- Octahedron (2009)
- Noctourniquet (2012) (credited but appears only on live bonus track)
- The Mars Volta (2022)
- Que Dios Te Maldiga Mi Corazón (2023)
- Lucro Sucio; Los Ojos del Vacío (2025)
- Lucro Sucio; Unfinished Business (2026)

=== With Omar Rodríguez-López ===
- Omar Rodriguez (2005) (drums and percussion, gong, keyboards)
- Please Heat This Eventually (2006) (drums)
- Se Dice Bisonte, No Búfalo (2007) (drums and percussion, synths, clavinet)
- Omar Rodriguez-Lopez & Lydia Lunch (2007) (drums and percussion)
- The Apocalypse Inside of an Orange (2007) (drums, percussion, keyboards)
- Calibration (Is Pushing Luck and Key Too Far) (2007) (drums and percussion, synths, clavinet)
- Absence Makes the Heart Grow Fungus (2008) (drums)
- Minor Cuts and Scrapes in the Bushes Ahead (2008) (drums)
- Old Money (2008) (drums and percussion, synths, clavinet, keyboards)
- Megaritual (2009) (drums and percussion, synths, piano)
- Los Sueños de un Hígado (2009) (percussion)
- Xenophanes (2009) (percussion, keyboards)
- Solar Gambling (2009) (synths, piano)
- Sepulcros de Miel (2010) (drums and percussion, synths)
- Tychozorente (2010) (Mellotron)
- Cizaña de los Amores (2010) (drums, keyboards)
- Dōitashimashite (2010) (keyboards)
- Un Escorpión Perfumado (2010) (synths)
- Octopus Kool Aid (2012) (drums, engineering)
- Woman Gives Birth To Tomato! (2013) (drums)
- Arañas en la Sombra (2016) (keyboards, drums, percussion)
- El Bien y Mal Nos Une (2016) (keys and percussion)
- Weekly Mansions (2016) (synths, mellotron, percussion, programming, co-writing, production, mixing, recording)
- Some Need It Lonely (2016) (percussion)
- A Lovejoy (2016) (live and programmed drums, synthesizer)
- Ensayo de un Desaparecido (2017) (keyboards)
- Azul, Mis Dientes (2017) (live and programmed drums, synths)
- The Clouds Hill Tapes Parts I, II & III (2020) (keyboards)
- Live at Clouds Hill (2024) (keyboards)
- Is It the Clouds? (2024) (drums)

=== With Zechs Marquise ===
- 34:26 EP (2006)
- Our Delicate Stranded Nightmare (2008)
- Getting Paid (2011)

=== Guest appearances ===
- Terra Incognita by Juliette Lewis (2009) (clavinet, synthesizer, percussion)
- The Golden Age of Knowhere by Funeral Party (2011) (keyboards)
- A Raw Youth by Le Butcherettes (2015) (Moog bass, Moog synthesizer, percussion)
- Halo Orbit by Halo Orbit (2016/2017)
