= Sworn virgin =

Sworn virgin may refer to:

- Celibacy, the state of voluntarily being unmarried and/or sexually abstinent
- Balkan sworn virgins, women in certain Balkan cultures who take a vow of chastity and present as male
- Sworn Virgin (film), 2015 drama directed by Laura Bispuri
- Sworn Virgins, studio album by Omar Rodríguez-López
