= The Clouds Hill Tapes Parts I, II & III =

Compilation album by Omar Rodríguez-López
- Released: July 24, 2020
- Recorded: 2018–2019
- Studio: Clouds Hill
- Genre: Psychedelic pop
- Length: Part I: 31:15; Part II: 24:24; Part III: 23:32; Total: 79:11
- Label: Clouds Hill
- Producer: Johann Scheerer

Omar Rodríguez-López solo chronology
Doom Patrol (2017)	The Clouds Hill Tapes Parts I, II & III (2020)	Amor de Frances (2023)

Omar Rodríguez-López chronology
Diamanté (2017)	The Clouds Hill Tapes Parts I, II & III (2020)	La Realidad De Los Sueños (2021)

The Clouds Hill Tapes Parts I, II & III is a session collection of twenty songs released on July 24, 2020, by Omar Rodríguez-López as a solo artist. It is a 3-LP set featuring new rerecorded versions of tracks from nine of Omar's twenty-three records released in the "Ipecac Series" of 2016–2017 and serves as a compilation grouping distinct genres of his vast array of music across three 180 gram 12" vinyl. It is Rodríguez-López's first release on Clouds Hill records since 2012.

== Overview ==
The three sessions are taken from the years 2018 and 2019, while Rodríguez-López was in Hamburg, Germany for a festival. He states, "We got the band together, rehearsed for two days – and then we ran the tapes." Regarding producer Johann Scheerer's involvement, he further stated, "Johann is great at was he does. What makes him truly special is his instinct. This helps him find most interesting sounds, make the right decision." The Tapes were recorded, mixed, and produced at Clouds Hill Studios featuring alternately arranged versions of previously released songs.

The box set includes 10 monochrome photographic prints taken during the recording session at Clouds Hill Studio in 2019. Pre-orders were announced on May 26, 2020, for the vinyl box set to release two months later. The Tapes serve as Omar's first physical solo release since 2012 as well as his very first solo release through the Clouds Hill label apart from the Faust & Omar Rodríguez-López collaborative 10" EP of the ongoing ...Live At Clouds Hill series.

The majority of the tracks were initially recorded between 2011 and 2012 during a highly prolific creative period. 8 of these 20 songs were performed at the studio in November 2018 by a new Omar Rodriguez Lopez Group that debuted at the annual Clouds Hill Festival.

Concerning the amalgamation of the specific songs, Rodríguez-López mentioned in an interview, "It’s just how this stuff always comes out really. I’ll be writing and some songs will make sense on an album or they won’t. I’m not normally very fussy all. I normally view songs in terms of clusters; do they need to exist alongside each other?"

Only 2 tracks are exclusive to this album: "It All Begins With You" and "Born To Be A Nobody." Whether they were new songs recorded here for the first time or old unreleased songs rerecorded for this album is unknown.

== Reception ==
Clash Music rated the collection 7/10, praising Rodríguez-López for his creativity, while also mentioning that some songs are too cluttered. Further, they didn't find the album cover appealing. Visions Magazine was favorable toward the album, noting the vocals of Virginia García Alves. They state, "Their soul-jazz vibe comes from the very present and distinctive voice of singer Virginia Garcia Alvez, who hasn't yet made a name for herself in the rock scene, but leaves her mark on this project."

Hazy Eye Music Media was also receptive of the Tapes, stating, "...this incarnation of The Omar Rodríguez-López Group has transformed these solo originals into three very different sets of virtuosic grooves." Plattentests gave a middling review of the album, denigrating specific aspects of the rearranged tracks such as Alvez's vocals which they deem "bland" at times and "To Kill a Chi Chi" lacking its subtle noise underpinnings. However, Everything Is Noise preferred Alvez's vocals. The Clouds Hill Tapes Parts I, II & III has been regarded as one of Rodríguez-López's best albums.

== Track listing ==
Part I (A)
No.	Title	Original Album	Length
1.	"Roman Lips"	Roman Lips	2:35
2.	"Fishtank"	Roman Lips	3:15
3.	"Bitter Tears"	Roman Lips	4:52
4.	"Houses Full Of Hurt"	Umbrella Mistress	3:21

Part I (B)
No.	Title	Original Album	Length
5.	"Science Urges"	Weekly Mansions	4:45
6.	"Fool So Bleak"	Killing Tingled Lifting Retreats	3:42
7.	"Arcos Del Amor"	Arañas en La Sombra	4:46
8.	"To Kill A Chi Chi"	Sworn Virgins	3:59

Part II (A)
No.	Title	Original Album	Length
9.	"Diamond Teeth"	Umbrella Mistress	3:53
10.	"Vanishing Tide"	Blind Worms, Pious Swine	3:15
11.	"Eastern Promises"	Umbrella Mistress	4:18

Part II (B)
No.	Title	Original Album	Length
12.	"Through Wires"	Umbrella Mistress / Saber, Querer, Osar y Callar	4:05
13.	"Killing Out (The Special Tide)"	Solid State Mercenaries	5:18
14.	"We Feel The Silence"	Corazones	3:35

Part III (A)
No.	Title	Original Album	Length
15.	"Winter's Gone"	Umbrella Mistress	2:48
16.	"It All Begins With You"	-	4:51
17.	"Running Away"	Corazones	3:24

Part III (B)
No.	Title	Original Album	Length
18.	"Paint Yourself A Saint"	Killing Tingled Lifting Retreats	4:04
19.	"Born To Be A Nobody"	-	4:11
20.	"Tell Me What I Did Wrong"	Umbrella Mistress	4:14

== Personnel ==
Musicians

- Omar Rodríguez-López – guitar, lyrics, direction
- Marcel Rodríguez-López – bass, keyboards, synthesizers, programming
- Leo Genovese – keyboards, piano
- Virginia García Alves – lead vocals
- Audrey Paris Johnson – drums (tracks 1-8, 15-20)

Technical

- Johann Scheerer – production

== Release history ==
Region	Date	Label	Format
Germany	July 24, 2020	Clouds Hill	LP
