= Mark Aanderud =

Mexican conductor and composer

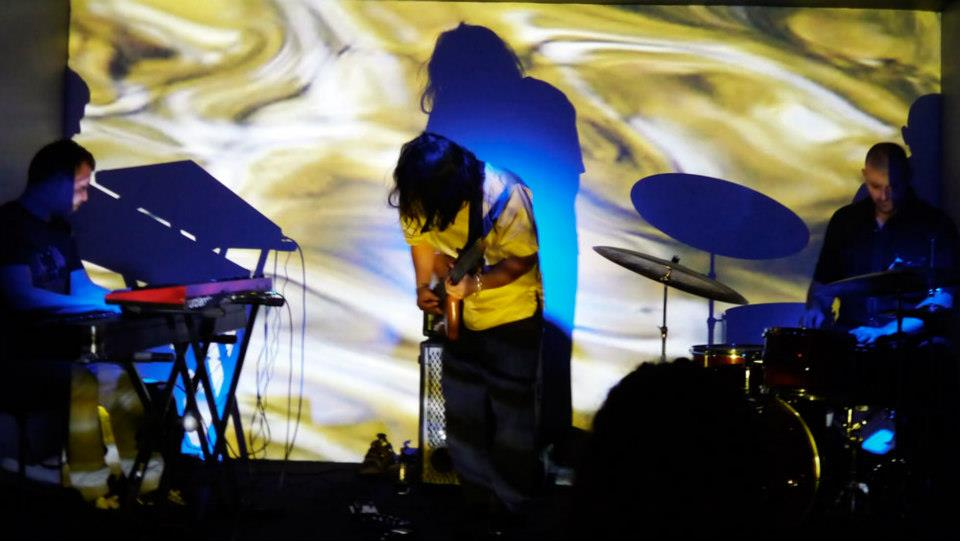
- Aanderud, left, performimg with Stomu Takeishi and Hernán Hecht

Background information
- Born: 1976 (age 49–50); Mexico
- Origin: Mexico City, Mexico
- Genres: Jazz rock, classical rock, progressive rock, Latin rock
- Occupations: Pianist, composer, arranger, producer, conductor
- Instrument: Piano
- Years active: 1994–present

Mark Aanderud (born 1976) is a Mexican pianist, composer, arranger, producer and conductor.

Aanderud started piano studies at 8 years old at the Escuela Nacional de Musica in Mexico City. He started to perform professionally when he was 18 years old. Aanderud is known as a jazz pianist and composer, but through the years he has also performed, composed and recorded in several genres from Jazz and classical music to progressive rock and Latin music. His first CD as a leader, Mark Aanderud Trio 02, was awarded best jazz album of the year 2003 by the Czech Music Awards.

Aanderud has toured with international artists including the Mexican singer-songwriter and actress Ximena Sariñana and the Omar Rodriguez-Lopez Group. Aanderud has also recorded additional piano parts with The Mars Volta for their 2009 release Octahedron.

== Discography ==
With The Mars Volta

- Octahedron (2009)

With Stomu Takeishi, Hernán Hecht

- RGB (RareNoise Records, 2014)

With the Omar Rodriguez-Lopez Group

- Los Sueños de un Higado (2009)
- Xenophanes (2009)
- Woman Gives Birth To Tomato! (2013)
- Doom Patrol (2017)
