= The Memorials =

American hard rock band

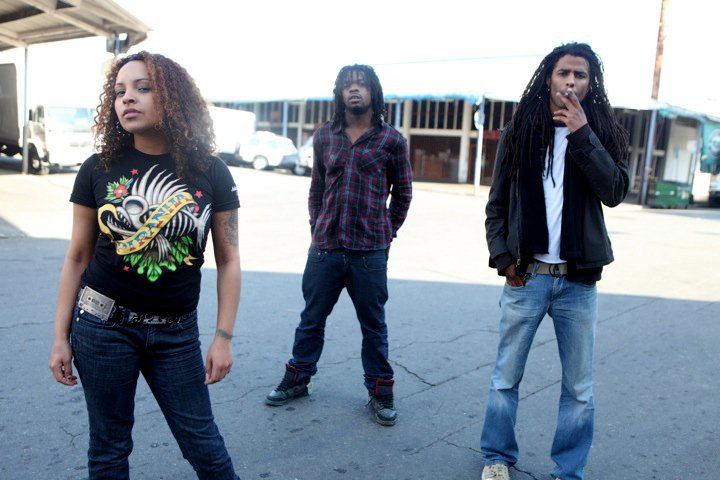
- Left to right: Viveca Hawkins, Thomas Pridgen and Nick Brewer

Background information
- Origin: Berkeley, California
- Genres: Hard rock
- Years active: 2009–present
- Members: Thomas Pridgen; Viveca Hawkins; Nick Brewer

The Memorials is an American hard rock band from Berkeley, California that formed in December 2009. As of 2012, the line-up consists of Thomas Pridgen, Viveca Hawkins, and Nick Brewer.

== History ==
Founded in December 2009, The Memorials is a project spearheaded by Thomas Pridgen. After departing The Mars Volta, Pridgen turned his attention to forming his own group, which would incorporate a range of styles as diverse as the experiences of the band members. He contacted friends Viveca Hawkins and Nick Brewer, who were former students at Berklee College of Music, and asked them to establish a new band with him. Brewer and Hawkins met for the first time, after Brewer arrived in San Francisco, just a day shy of recording their first album.

The Memorials' self-titled debut album The Memorials was recorded at the Petting Zoo Recording Studio (The Zoo) in North Oakland, California, as well as at Pridgen's home studio between December 14, 2009, and February 3, 2010. It was released on February 14, 2011. To support their album in 2011, the band went on a 31-date nationwide tour largely backed by fans.

Their second album, Delirium, was released on June 5, 2012. The track "Fluorescents Unforgiving" was released via SoundCloud in November 2011.

After completing 3 tours (Freedom Tour, Equinox Tour, Waterguns, B B Q, & Hot Chocolate Tour) over the United States, The Memorials are preparing for a European tour to launch in October 2012.

== Band members ==
=== Current members ===
- Viveca Hawkins – vocals
- Nick Brewer – guitars
- Thomas Pridgen – drums

=== Additional musicians ===
- Randy Emata – keyboards
- Chris Bass Head – bass

=== Former members ===
- Alexander Potts – guitars
- Chris Woods – keyboards

== Discography ==
- The Memorials (2011)
- Delirium (2012)
