= Thomas Pridgen =

American drummer (born 1983)

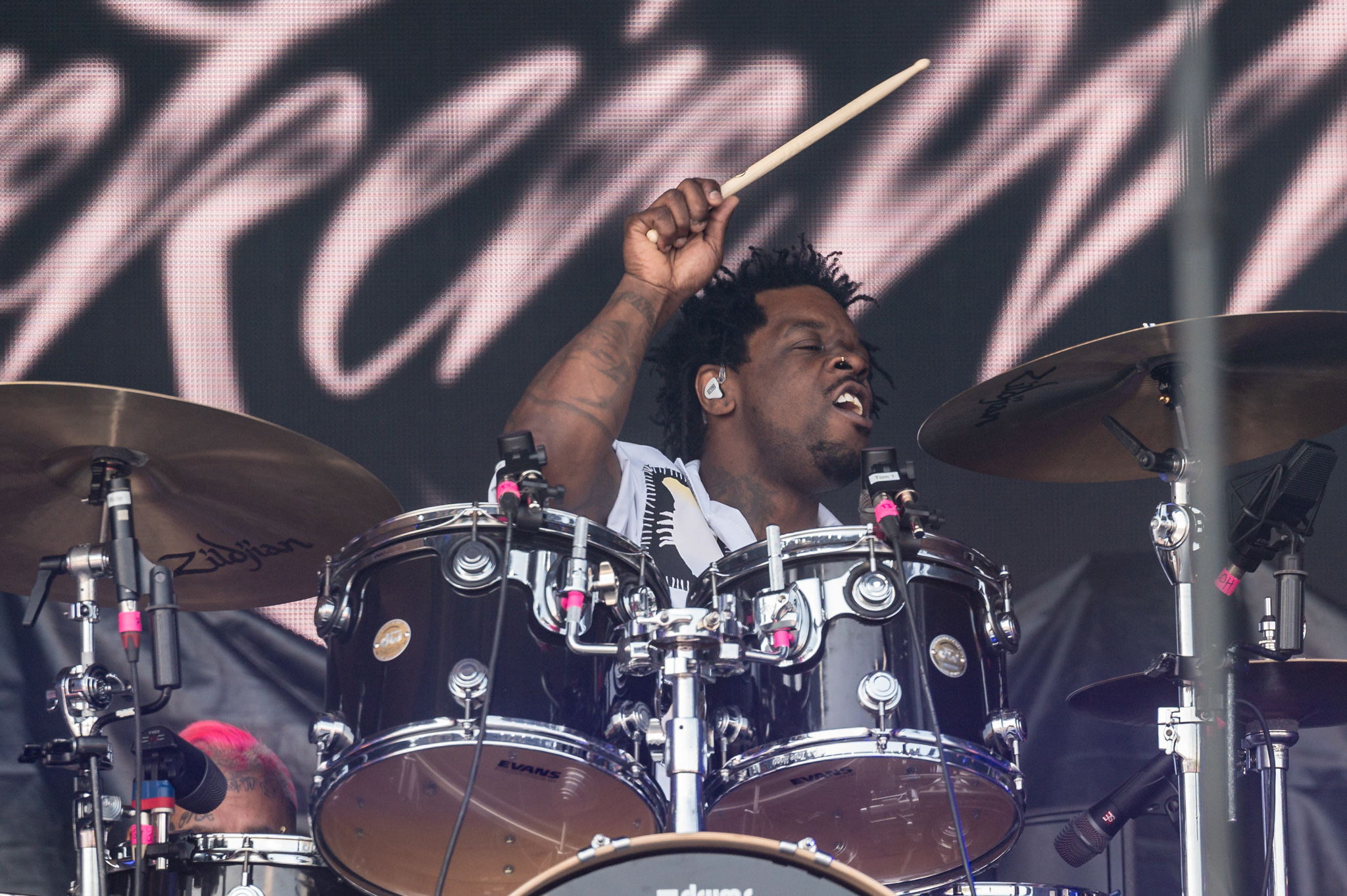
- Pridgen performing in 2023

Background information
- Also known as: "Thomas 'Perpetual Solo' Pridgen"
- Born: Thomas Armon Pridgen; November 23, 1983 (age 42); Alameda County, California, U.S.
- Origin: El Cerrito, California, U.S.
- Genres: Jazz rock; gospel; experimental rock; fusion; progressive rock; hard rock; hardcore punk
- Occupation: Musician
- Instrument: Drums
- Years active: 1999–present
- Member of: Trash Talk; The Memorials; Fever 333
- Formerly of: The Mars Volta; Suicidal Tendencies
- Website: thomaspridgen.wordpress.com

Thomas Armon Pridgen (born November 23, 1983) is an American drummer, best known for his role as the drummer of The Mars Volta from 2006 until 2009. He is touring with rapper Residente and is the drummer for hardcore punk band Trash Talk, as well as his own project The Memorials. In 2023 he joined Fever 333.

== Biography ==
Pridgen won the Guitar Center Drum-Off at age nine, and at age ten was the youngest recipient for a Zildjian endorsement in the nearly 400-year history of the company. Pridgen is also naturally left-handed, but plays the drum kit as if he is a right-hander with his kit set-up right-handed. Pridgen has studied with David Garibaldi, Walfredo Reyes Sr., Troy Lucketta, and Curtis Nutall. He endorses DW Drums, Zildjian Cymbals, Evans Drumheads, Audix Microphones, and Zildjian Drumsticks (as of 2017). Pridgen was also the recipient of a four-year scholarship to Berklee College of Music in 1999 at the age of 15; he was the youngest musician to ever receive this scholarship. He has played in clinics with Walfredo Reyes Jr. and Dennis Chambers. By his teenage years he had already done studio sessions with many Bay Area Gospel artists.

Pridgen's first non-gospel touring experience was as the drummer for The Coup, who he worked with in 2001 and 2002.

In 2006, Pridgen received a call from Omar Rodríguez-López of The Mars Volta:

"Omar asked if I wanted to come check out the band," Pridgen recalls from his home in El Cerrito, California. "We talked on the phone for a couple of hours, and then I went to Ohio to meet them. Omar invited me to a back room, where the whole band was set up. We jammed for a good thirty minutes. He then said, 'We're going to play that groove tonight in front of everybody.' This was for a huge show in Cleveland, when the band was touring with the Red Hot Chili Peppers.

In 2007, Pridgen became the new permanent drummer for The Mars Volta. Pridgen's first appearance was at the March 12 show in New Zealand, where the band debuted the song "Idle Tooth" which was later renamed "Wax Simulacra" for the forthcoming album. After shows in New Zealand and Australia, The Mars Volta toured a few West Coast venues as the headliner, then entered the studio to record their fourth LP, The Bedlam in Goliath. Pridgen's style on Bedlam in Goliath used "blistering 32nd-note full-set combinations, stunning single-stroke rolls, and blazing single bass drum patterns" along with creative and precise paradiddle technique.

Pridgen has been voted as 'Best Up and Coming Drummer' by Modern Drummer magazine.

Besides his work with The Mars Volta, he has also been involved with Christian Scott and Wicked Wisdom. Pridgen, for some time, was working with singer Keyshia Cole as her live and session drummer and being her music director. He also was featured alongside Tony Royster Jr., Eric Moore, and others in drumming DVD entitled "Shed Sessions", a Gospel Chops DVD.

Pridgen was also featured on the Modern Drummer 2008 DVD with footage from his performance at the festival.

=== Departure from The Mars Volta (2009) ===
In October 2009, Pridgen left The Mars Volta. To this day, the band has made no official statement as to the reason for the departure. Dave Elitch subsequently filled in the drummer position for the remainder of the tour, who was then replaced by Deantoni Parks.

=== The Memorials (December 2009) ===
In December 2009, Pridgen formed another band called The Memorials with friends and former students from Berklee College of Music - Viveca Hawkins (vocals) and Nick Brewer (guitars).

The band's self-titled debut was released on January 18, 2011.

=== Elixir on Mute (2010) ===
By invitation of Elixir on Mute's headman Jordan Ferreira, Pridgen took part in the recording of the band's debut End of Sky (released September 1 2010).

November 10, 2011, the band had decided upon a name, Giraffe Tongue Orchestra. By then the supergroup was working on writing songs.

In January 2012, it was announced that fellow former The Mars Volta drummer Jon Theodore replaced Pridgen in Giraffe Tongue Orchestra, though by March 2015, Pridgen once again became the drummer of GTO.

=== The Memorials (Delirium), TEN (Eric McFadden), Vigilant (Jon Reshard), Thundercat (Stephen Bruner), Elixir On Mute (Jordan Ferreira), Wicked Evolution (Jada Pinkett Smith) (2012) ===
The Memorials

Still working on his personal project The Memorials. His second album, Delirium, released on June 5, 2012. The track "Fluorescent's Unforgiving" was released via SoundCloud in November 2011.

TEN

Spring of 2012, teamed up with guitarist, Eric McFadden (P-Funk, The Animals, Stockholm Syndrome), and Fishbone bassist, Norwood Fisher. phYne Entertainment produced five tracks for the new trio in a San Francisco studio. The project is called, TEN, as there is talk of a tour in the fall.

Vigilant

Recording album with Jon Reshard, Chloe Pappas, Jordan Ferreira. Work to be released in 2012.

Thundercat

Guest live drummer in support of Thundercat. Toured all over Europe in spring 2012.

Wicked Evolution

Took part in Wicked Evolution Jada Pinkett Smith's Live Recorded Sessions.

European tour with The Memorials

After completing 3 tours (Freedom Tour, Equinox Tour, Waterguns, B B Q, & Hot Chocolate Tour) over the United States with The Memorials, the band are preparing for a European tour to launch in October 2012.

Pinnick Gales Pridgen

On February 12, 2013, Magna Carta released the Mike Varney-produced "Pinnick Gales Pridgen", featuring Eric Gales on guitar and vocals, dUg Pinnick (of King's X) on bass and vocals, and Pridgen on drums. The 13-track album features one cover song, "Sunshine of Your Love", originally by Cream, one short instrumental based on Ludwig van Beethoven's "Für Elise", and the remaining songs written by some combination of Pinnick, Gales, Pridgen and Varney.

=== Suicidal Tendencies, Chiodos, Trash Talk (2014) ===
On March 11, 2014, Pridgen confirmed on his Instagram and Facebook page that he has joined Suicidal Tendencies. On September 3, Pridgen along with Joseph Troy have joined Chiodos after members Derrick Frost and Matt Goddard left the band. During this time period, Pridgen also recorded the drums for the album "No Peace", by Trash Talk, which was released April 22, 2014.

=== Giraffe Tongue Orchestra (2011, 2015–2017) ===
In mid-2011, it was announced that Pridgen was working on a new group with Mastodon vocalist and guitarist Brent Hinds, the Dillinger Escape Plan guitarist Ben Weinman, and former Jane's Addiction bassist Eric Avery. Giraffe Tongue Orchestra was founded in 2012.

The band's debut album Broken Lines was released September 23, 2016 with the main line-up featuring Hinds, Pridgen and Weinman, who were joined by William DuVall from Alice in Chains and Pete Griffin from Dethklok.

=== Residente, rejoining Trash Talk and joining Fever 333 (2017–present) ===
On March 31, 2017, rapper Residente released his debut solo album self-titled Residente. Pridgen was announced later as part of the touring members of the Residente band.

In May 2020, Pridgen announced he has rejoined Trash Talk to record their new EP, Squalor, which is due to be released June 6.

In 2021, The Mask of the Phantasm released their debut album New Axial Age featuring Pridgen on drums alongside another former member of The Mars Volta, Adrián Terrazas-González.

In 2023, Fever 333 frontman Jason Aalon Butler announced that Pridgen, along with April Kae and Brandon Davis, are the new members of the band, replacing original members Stephen Harrison and Aric Improta, as drummer, bassist and guitarist, respectively. The band's debut single as a quartet, "$wing," was released on May 31, 2023.

== Equipment ==
=== With The Mars Volta ===
==== Bedlam Tour Kit (2007–2008) ====
- DW Collector's Series & Zildjian Cymbals:
- Drums - Clear Acrylic
  - 12x8" Tom
  - 13x10" Tom
  - 15x13" Floor Tom
  - 16x14" Floor Tom
  - 18x16" Floor Tom
  - 24x20" Bass Drum
  - 14x6.5" DW Copper Snare
- Cymbals - Zildjian
  - 18" [x2] A Crashes used as Hi-Hats
  - 24" A Medium Ride
  - 20" A Armand Ride
  - 20" A Custom Crash
  - 20" Oriental Crash Of Doom
  - 18" A Custom EFX Crash, 9" Oriental Splash, 16" Oriental China (x2) (cymbals stacked)
  - 19" K Custom Hybrid China

==== Octahedron Tour Kit (2009) ====
- DW Jazz Series & Zildjian Cymbals:
- Drums - Maple & Gum
  - 12x12" Tom
  - 13x13" Tom
  - 15x13" Floor Tom
  - 16x14" Floor Tom
  - 18x16" Floor Tom
  - 24x20" Bass Drum
  - 14x7 Red Maple Snare
- Cymbals - Zildjian
  - 18" A Crashes [x2] used as Hi-Hats
  - 24" A Medium Ride
  - 24" K Custom Ride [x2]
  - 18" A Custom EFX Crash, 9" Oriental Splash, 16" Oriental China (x2) (cymbals stacked)
  - 20" A Custom China
  - 20" Crash of Doom

=== With The Memorials ===
- DW Collector's Series & Zildjian Cymbals:
- Drums - Clear Acrylic
  - 12x7" Tom
  - 13x8" Tom
  - 16x14" Floor Tom
  - 18x16" Floor Tom
  - 24x16" Bass Drum
  - 14x6.5" DW Stainless steel snare
- Cymbals - Zildjian
  - 19" [x2] Z3 Custom Crashes used as Hi-Hats
  - 24" A Medium Ride
  - 20" A Custom Crash
  - 20" Z3 Crash
  - 18" A Custom EFX Crash, 9" Oriental Splash, 16" Oriental China (x2) (cymbals stacked)
  - 20" A Custom China
  - Wind Chimes
- Drum Heads - Evans
  - Toms: (12", 13", 15", 16") Clear G2s (top), Clear Resonants (bottom)
  - Bass Drum: (24") Clear EQ3 (batter), Clear EQ3 (with small hole) (resonant)
  - Snares : (14") Clear G2 (top), 300 Hazy (bottom)
- Thomas also used DW 9000 Series Hardware and Pedals, Pro-Mark TX510 Thomas Pridgen Autograph drumsticks, & Shure Microphones.
- Thomas has recently been seen using a kit made from resin by a company based out of Ventura, CA Thump Drums.

== Discography ==
For a more complete discography, see Thomas Pridgen's entry on Album Credits.

=== With Zenith Patrol ===
- VU (2005)

=== With Christian Scott ===
- Rewind That (2006)

=== With Eric Gales ===
- Crystal Vision - (2006)
- Psychedelic Underground (Eric Gales album) - (2007)

=== With dUg Pinnick and Eric Gales ===
- "Pinnick Gales Pridgen" - (2013)
- "PGP 2" - (2014)

=== With The Mars Volta ===
- The Bedlam in Goliath (2008)
- Octahedron (2009)

=== With Omar Rodríguez-López ===
- Calibration (Is Pushing Luck and Key Too Far) (2007) - "Mexico", "Sidewalk Fins", "Las Lagrimas de Arakuine"
- Los Sueños de un Hígado (2009)
- Xenophanes (2009)
- Equinox (2013) - "Sueños Salvajes" & "Popolon"
- ¿Sólo Extraño? (2013) - "Common Condescend"
- Nom de Guerre Cabal (2016) - "Nom de Guerre"
- Some Need It Lonely (2016) - "Sanity a Dream", "Back to the Same", "Zero Worth"/"Barachiel Is At It Again"
- Gorilla Preacher Cartel (2017) - "Lección en Ignoracia"
- Solid State Mercenaries (2017) - "Five Star" & "Try On Little Man"

=== With Juliette Lewis ===
- Terra Incognita (2009)

=== With Elixir on Mute ===
- End of Sky (2010)

=== With Foxy Shazam ===
- Foxy Shazam (2010)

=== With Thundercat ===
- Lotus And The Jondy (2013)

=== With Jada Pinkett Smith ===
- Live Recording Sessions (2012)

=== With The Memorials ===
- The Memorials (2011)
- Delirium (2012)

=== With Trash Talk ===
- "No Peace" (2014)
- "Squalor" (2020)

=== With Spiritworld ===
- Pagan Rhythms (2020)
- DEATHWESTERN (2022)

With Mask of the Phantasm

- New Axial Age (2021)
