= Absence Makes the Heart Grow Fungus =

Studio album by Omar Rodríguez-López
- Released: September 19, 2008
- Recorded: 2001–2008
- Genre: Experimental rock
- Length: 43:41
- Label: Infrasonic Sound
- Producer: Omar Rodríguez-López

Omar Rodríguez-López solo chronology
Omar Rodriguez-Lopez & Jeremy Michael Ward (2008)	Absence Makes the Heart Grow Fungus (2008)	Minor Cuts and Scrapes in the Bushes Ahead (2008)

Omar Rodríguez-López chronology
The Bedlam in Goliath (2008)	Absence Makes the Heart Grow Fungus (2008)	Octahedron (2009)

Absence Makes the Heart Grow Fungus is the first instrumental and sixth overall studio album and by Omar Rodríguez-López, released by Infrasonic Sound on September 19, 2008. It is one of four solo albums completed in 2001 by Omar Rodríguez-López during the interim period following the demise of At the Drive-In and the formation of The Mars Volta. Absence... was tracked at Doug Messenger's North Hollywood studio only a few weeks after Rodriguez-Lopez recorded A Manual Dexterity: Soundtrack Volume One there, and is comparable to that project in both sound and atmosphere. The album has been described as alternative, experimental, jazz fusion, while also having complex rhythms.

The album features several tracks that were "originally intended for use by The Mars Volta." The second half of "Hands Tied to the Roots of a Hemorrhage" was reworked as a middle section of "Eriatarka" on The Mars Volta's first full-length, De-loused in the Comatorium. "Tied Prom Digs on the Docks" features musical ideas that were later used on Cassandra Gemini on Frances the Mute. Furthermore, the song "Teflon" from the 2009 album Octahedron would be based on the instrumental "A Story Teeth Rotted For". Parts of "Of Ankles to Stone" would show up in the Con Safo sections in "Cygnus....Vismund Cygnus" and "Miranda, That Ghost Just Isn't Holy Anymore". Additionally, "Mood Swings" would be used in a later Omar Rodriguez-Lopez solo album, どういたしまして (Dōitashimashite).

No personnel credits are listed in the insert for either the LP or CD, though it features a photograph of Jeremy Michael Ward never seen prior to this release. According to press release, Ward didn't play on the album but was present during the sessions. Clouds Hill, who reissued the album, described it thus: "Literally a timeless record: Remembering a friend, using a song that was too much for At The Drive-In and making a blueprint of a song The Mars Volta recorded many years later."

== Reception ==
The Quietus was favorable toward the album describing it as a creative endeavor, characterized by riffed styles of other reputable bands. Plattentests.de wrote a critical review of Absence..., denigrating the eclectic nature of each song while also noting the unoriginality of the record. However, they praised Rodríguez-López's musicianship. Visions.de, while commenting on the experimentation that Rodríguez-López employs, describes the work as "not exhilarating at every moment, but overwhelming at its best." Paste Magazine regards the music as "strange."

== Track listing ==
All tracks are written by Omar Rodríguez-López.

No.	Title	Length
1.	"Hands Tied to the Roots of a Hemorrhage"	4:05
2.	"City Dreams Inside a Truck"	1:44
3.	"Sex, Consolation for Misery"	4:25
4.	"Tied Prom Digs on the Docks"	11:24
5.	"Seeth of Cloudless Hymstone"	2:45
6.	"Mood Swings"	6:53
7.	"An Ancient Shrewdness in the Veins"	4:10
8.	"A Story Teeth Rotted For"	3:48
9.	"Of Ankles to Stone"	4:32
Total length:		43:41

== Release history ==
Region	Date	Label
Germany	September 19, 2008	Willie Anderson Recordings
United Kingdom	September 22, 2008	Willie Anderson Recordings
United States	October 28, 2008	Infrasonic Sound

== Personnel ==
- Omar Rodríguez-López – guitars, bass, keyboards, synthesizers, piano, drum machine, percussion, melodica
- Blake Fleming – drums (1,4,9)
- Marcel Rodríguez-López – drums, percussion (3,7)
- Adrián Terrazas-González – saxophone (4)
- Sara Christina Gross – saxophone (6)

=== Production ===
- Omar Rodríguez-López – producer, writer
- Jon Debaun – engineering
- Shawn Sullivan – mixing
