= Noctourniquet =

Studio album by the Mars Volta
- Released: March 26, 2012
- Recorded: 2009–2011
- Genres: Progressive rock; experimental rock
- Length: 64:31
- Labels: Warner Bros.; Sargent House; Rodriguez-Lopez Productions (vinyl release)
- Producer: Omar Rodríguez-López

The Mars Volta chronology
Octahedron (2009)	Noctourniquet (2012)	The Ramrod Tapes (2013)

Singles from Noctourniquet
- 1. "The Malkin Jewel" Released: February 14, 2012

Noctourniquet is the sixth studio album by American progressive rock band The Mars Volta, released on March 26, 2012 on Warner Bros. Produced by guitarist and songwriter Omar Rodriguez-Lopez, it is the band's only studio album to feature drummer Deantoni Parks, their first not to include contributions from guitarist John Frusciante, and their last to include bassist Juan Alderete.

Inspired by the children's nursery rhyme "Solomon Grundy", and the Greek myth of Hyacinthus, Noctourniquet is a concept album.

Following the album's release, The Mars Volta broke up due to ongoing tension and disagreements between core members Rodriguez-Lopez and lyricist Cedric Bixler-Zavala. As a result, Noctourniquet became the final studio album of the band's initial run. In 2019, the band reunited in secret, releasing its first studio album in ten years, The Mars Volta, in 2022.

== Commercial performance ==
Noctourniquet debuted on the Billboard 200 at No. 15 with 21,000 albums sold in its first week. In Canada, the album debuted at No. 44 on the Canadian Albums Chart. In its second week of sales, the album dropped 85 places to No. 100 on the Billboard 200.

== Background and recording ==
Noctourniquet's origins can be traced back to a collaboration between Rodriguez-Lopez and Deantoni Parks which wasn't definitively marked as a Mars Volta record as-of-then. However, it was eventually developed by the rest of the band to become their sixth studio album. Regarding Parks involvement in Noctourniquet, Bixler-Zavala stated thus: "When we let Thomas [Pridgen, former drummer] go, we were in the middle of having to honor all these dates which included the Big Day Out performances last time, for which we had a drummer named Dave Elitch. But when that happened, we were working on the side on this record that Omar had been making with Deantoni, which was a lot of heavy synth and different kinds of song structures. We just jumped on it and made it a Volta record, and then we started writing more stuff with him, and in the process it became what our sixth album is gonna be."

Much of the album was recorded in 2009, shortly after the band finished mixing their previous studio album, Octahedron. An argument, however, between Rodriguez-Lopez and Bixler-Zavala, resulted in the latter's contributions taking up to two and a half years to be completed. Rodriguez-Lopez noted, "He and I have very few arguments after twenty years of being friends, and we sort of got into this argument. He felt that he’s been trying to keep up with my pace for all these years, and it’s not natural for him, and he didn’t think we had to put out a record every year. He wanted to take his time with it, and he didn’t like me being on top of him like I usually am. [...] So I said okay, well, you have the record in your hands. When you’re ready, you’ll call me and we’ll do it. And a year went by, two years went by, and I sort of started telling him well, wait a minute. [...] It was just a strange record for me. I’m used to taking what I always say are snapshots — Polaroid shots — of where I’m at, and this is more like a long, drawn-out... something."

Rodriguez-Lopez subsequently returned to the studio, with bassist Juan Alderete, prior to the album's mixing, to add additional guitar and bass overdubs. Regarding their return to the studio, Alderete stated, "[Omar] wasn’t happy about the album taking that long. He was just kind of burned out on it. It’s hard to work on something you created three years ago and then go back to it again. It was hard for me to feel good while cutting it because of him sitting there not wanting to be there. Omar is a guy who is working on things that are way beyond anything that we’re doing now."

Regarding drummer Deantoni Parks' contributions, Rodriguez-Lopez noted, "He sort of does away with all the clichés that I’ve come to accept over the years with drummers. [...] I gave him way more freedom than I’d given any other drummer, and still I feel like it wasn’t enough [...] I’ve had to wrestle with drummers, wrestle with musicians, to get them to understand my technique, [but] I don’t think we did more than two takes on anything, and we usually took his first take. And if we did more than that, it was merely for my own enjoyment because I was so blown away by what I was hearing."

Regarding the absence of regular in-studio collaborator John Frusciante, Rodriguez-Lopez stated, "John's in a different place right now. He's in a place where he couldn't care less about putting things out, or about something being a product. He's living by different standards right now with a different philosophy, so he doesn't want to be a part of anything that he knows is going to end up being a product. A Mars Volta record definitely ends up being a product."

== Writing and composition ==
Vocalist and lyricist Cedric Bixler-Zavala stated that the album's title stemmed from a story he was writing, entitled The Boy With the Voice in His Knives. He also mentioned on his YouTube channel that he may release the story in a form of graphic novel, with the art contributed by visual artist Zeque Peña; the plans however never came to fruition.

Regarding Noctourniquet's aesthetic, Rodriguez-Lopez noted, "For myself, it was definitely keeping things concise. At first, I had a rule that I was only gonna play four notes per song, but that kind of went away after a while. But it was definitely about limiting the guitar, and just taking all those parts and arranging them for other instruments—mainly the keyboard."

Rodriguez-Lopez described the album as "the end of an era", in terms of how he dictates his bandmates' recording contributions. Upon the album's release, bassist Juan Alderete noted, "We recorded a lot of it three or four years ago, so it’s hard for me to remember everything. It’s not like I have a lot of time in the studio. Omar just sits me down and wants to get it over with. This one more than ever."

== Release and promotion ==
8 of 13 songs from Noctourniquet ("The Whip Hand", "Aegis", "Dyslexicon", "The Malkin Jewel", "Lapochka", "Molochwalker", "Trinkets Pale of Moon", "Noctourniquet") were debuted live in March 2011 during the Omar Rodriguez-Lopez Group North American tour, a full year before the album release. Although initially unannounced, Cedric Bixler-Zavala joined the group (which consisted of Omar and Marcel Rodriguez Lopez, Juan Alderete, Deantoni Parks and additional keyboardist/sound manipulator Lars Stalfors) on March 19 show at SXSW as a guest vocalist, thus basically making it a complete TMV lineup, and since that performed with them on all but 3 further tour dates. As most of the material played was completely new, speculations appeared of the tour being simply a "secret" Mars Volta tour under the ORLG moniker. An official TMV tour began in summer of 2011; during these shows the band continued to play the new material premiered earlier in the year, with Bixler-Zavala telling the crowd at one show that he was "inviting them to a private rehearsal for their new album," confirming the rumors. Some of the songs were performed under slightly different names during these early performances. The Whip Hand was titled "The Whip Hands," Trinkets Pale of Moon was titled "Trinkets Pale The Moon," Molochwalker was "Molochwalk," and The Malkin Jewel was simply "Jewel."

Despite the album being ready by mid-2011, it was announced that it was expecting a release in 2012, under the explanation that there were label politics issues. In an act of response, TMV fans have taken social media to their advantage, helping promote the upcoming release on various websites. On July 15, 2011, the Warner Bros. Records Facebook page posted a fan-shot YouTube video of The Mars Volta performing "Trinkets Pale of Moon" in Helsinki, Finland. The posting of this video quickly caused an internet fan-frenzy. Although most of the other links posted on the page only got just a few comments/likes, TMV performance link has claimed nearly 100 likes and around 260 comments from fans expressing their love for the band and begging Warner Bros. for even the slightest tidbit of information and promotion about the new album. Five days later (July 20), another Mars Volta-related post appeared on the WBR Facebook page, saying "Any The Mars Volta fans out there?? Just wondering." This post started another frenzy of online activity - resulting in this post 325 likes and 482 comments from fans. A Twitter campaign also began at this time, with fans tweeting with the tag "#themarsvolta2011" to gain support/recognition for the band/cause. Nevertheless, it wasn't until January 2012 when the album title, track list and release date of March 27 were finally announced.

The Malkin Jewel, the album's lead single, was first broadcast on February 13, 2012. It was subsequently made available for general release on February 14. The same day, an interactive page featuring the song was launched on the band's official website. Pre-orders for the album bundle appeared on the site with two options, the regular bundle featuring Noctourniquet CD and album art T-shirt, and the limited edition one also including special 12" x 12" lithograph of album art, signed by band members. Those who made the pre-orders from the site have also received free digital downloads of "The Malkin Jewel" and, on March 6, "Zed And Two Naughts" (coinciding with the song's release on MLB 12: The Show soundtrack); on the release date the whole album became available to download.

On March 8, pre-order sales of the vinyl were made available via Sargent House/Rodriguez-Lopez Productions. This release is a double 12" opaque blue and orange vinyl, which features a wide spine jacket with two full-color 3D inner sleeves and 3D glasses. Also included is a limited edition 12" × 24" full-color (folded) poster insert.

On March 13, it was announced via the band's official website and Twitter account that the release of the album would now take place a day earlier, on March 26, 2012.

== Reception ==
Professional ratings
Aggregate scores
Source	Rating
Metacritic	72/100
Review scores
Source	Rating
AllMusic	3/5 stars
Alternative Press	4/5 stars
Entertainment Weekly	B+
The Guardian	4/5 stars
musicOMH	4/5 stars
NME	3.5/5 stars
The Observer	4/5 stars
Paste	6.8/10
PopMatters	8/10
Rolling Stone	3/5 stars

The album has a score of 72 out of 100 from Metacritic, indicating "generally favorable reviews". Q gave the album a score of four stars out of five and said of the band, "There are so many ideas battling it out here it takes numerous listens to make sense of it, but persevere and this is perhaps their strongest set to date." The Fly also gave it four stars out of five and said that the band's narratives "have been stronger before, but 'Noctourniquet' remains abject absurdity masquerading as sexy heroism." The Phoenix gave it three stars out of four and said that "in a sense, the veil is lifted ever-so-slightly with [Noctourniquet]: although [The Mars Volta] still wump you with weird on sonic gauntlets like "Molochwalker" and the title track, they also hit on some great choruses and comprehensible songcraft that, unlike most of their earlier work, is commendable for something other than the effort it took to create it." Beats Per Minute gave the album a 71% score and said that it was "most certainly not a pinnacle for the group, but it is a welcome rekindling of the same spirit and sonic magnitude that fueled their last undisputed gem, 2005's Frances the Mute."

Spin gave the album a score of seven out of ten and said it "really does feel like the band's most accessible effort in years." Drowned in Sound also gave it seven out of ten and said, "The way it continues to go to the extreme within more conventional confines seems to have extracted both more emotional engagement as well as energy from The Mars Volta." Consequence of Sound gave it three and a half stars out of five and said, "For those who respect The Mars Volta for continuing to evolve after all these years, their latest offering will continue to inspire hope in the band's future." Clash also gave it seven out of ten and called it "a powerful reminder of the pair's quite brilliant lunacy." The A.V. Club gave it a B− and said, "The fresh focus on organic songwriting and sturdier, more evocative melodies renders Noctourniquet a welcome oddity in The Mars Volta's catalog: a work that shoots not for perfection, but for balance."

Other reviews are average or mixed: No Ripcord gave the album six stars out of ten and said that while it was not "completely successful, [it] finds The Mars Volta at their most pop and their most reasonable." Rolling Stone gave it three stars out of five and said, "Some songs explore emulsive alienation... but TMV are at their best dabbling in shades of aggro."

== Track listing ==
All lyrics written by Cedric Bixler-Zavala, all music composed by Omar Rodríguez-López.

No.	Title	Length
1.	"The Whip Hand"	4:49
2.	"Aegis"	5:11
3.	"Dyslexicon"	4:22
4.	"Empty Vessels Make the Loudest Sound"	6:43
5.	"The Malkin Jewel"	4:44
6.	"Lapochka"	4:16
7.	"In Absentia"	7:26
8.	"Imago"	3:58
9.	"Molochwalker"	3:33
10.	"Trinkets Pale of Moon"	4:25
11.	"Vedamalady"	3:54
12.	"Noctourniquet"	5:39
13.	"Zed and Two Naughts"	5:36
Total length:		64:31

Japanese bonus track
No.	Title	Length
14.	"The Malkin Jewel" (live)	5:08

=== Notes ===
- In Greek mythology, the Aegis is the shield or armor worn by Athena or Zeus.
- Dyslexicon is a portmanteau of the words dyslexia and lexicon.
- Lapochka is a Russian term of endearment for a young girl.
- In absentia is a legal term taken from Latin meaning "in absence" or "while absent".
- Imago is the final, adult stage of development of an insect; and also—in psychology—an idealised image of a person, usually a parent, formed in childhood, and carried unconsciously into adult life.
- Moloch is an Ammonite god associated with child sacrifice by parents.
- The Vedas are a large body of texts originating in ancient India.
- Noctourniquet is a portmanteau of the words nocturnal and tourniquet.
- "Zed and Two Naughts" refers to A Zed & Two Noughts, a 1985 film written and directed by Peter Greenaway; additionally, Zed being the letter Z, and the two naughts being O's (naught is zero), the word that can be pulled from the title is zoo, which relates to "The Boy With the Voice in his Knives", the story written by Bixler-Zavala. In the track-by-track analysis of the album, Bixler-Zavala likens the protagonist's home life as being "a zoo".

== Personnel ==
=== The Mars Volta ===
- Omar Rodríguez-López – guitar, keyboards, synths, bass, direction, arrangements
- Cedric Bixler-Zavala – vocals
- Juan Alderete – bass guitar
- Deantoni Parks – drums
- Marcel Rodríguez-López (credited but did not play on the album; appears only on Japanese bonus track)

=== Recording personnel ===
- Omar Rodríguez-López – producer, recording engineer
- Lars Stalfors – recording engineer, mixing
- Isaiah Abolin – recording engineer
- Heba Kadry – mastering
- Chris von Rautenkranz – mastering (vinyl)
- Florian Siller – mastering (vinyl)

=== Artwork ===
- Sonny Kay – artwork, layout, design

== Charts ==
Chart (2012)	Peak position
Australian Albums (ARIA)	18
Austrian Albums (Ö3 Austria)	66
Belgian Albums (Ultratop Flanders)	90
Canadian Albums (Billboard)	44
Dutch Albums (Album Top 100)	61
Finnish Albums (Suomen virallinen lista)	23
French Albums (SNEP)	130
German Albums (Offizielle Top 100)	58
Japanese Albums (Oricon)	32
New Zealand Albums (RMNZ)	25
Norwegian Albums (VG-lista)	34
Spanish Albums (Promusicae)	83
Swiss Albums (Schweizer Hitparade)	47
UK Albums (Official Charts)	51
US Billboard 200	15
US Top Alternative Albums (Billboard)	6
US Top Rock Albums (Billboard)	7
US Indie Store Album Sales (Billboard)	3
