= Tychozorente =

Studio album by Omar Rodríguez-López
- Released: September 14, 2010
- Recorded: 2000–2009
- Genre: Electronica, synthpop
- Length: 31:52
- Label: Rodriguez Lopez Productions
- Producer: Omar Rodriguez Lopez, Elvin Estela

Omar Rodríguez-López solo chronology
Sepulcros de Miel (2010)	Tychozorente (2010)	Cizaña de los Amores (2010)

Omar Rodríguez-López chronology
Octahedron (2009)	Tychozorente (2010)	Sin Sin Sin (2011)

Professional ratings
Review scores
Source	Rating
AllMusic	3.5/5 stars
PopMatters	6/10

Tychozorente is the sixteenth studio album by Omar Rodríguez-López. The digital version was released on September 14, 2010, and the CD was released by Rodriguez Lopez Productions in Europe on November 18, 2010. This record is Omar's first collaboration with DJ Nobody and his first release to feature no guitar. Two songs, "Polaridad" and "El Todo" were premiered during a performance by Omar Rodriguez Lopez Group at Metamorphose Festival, Japan, on September 4, 2010. An official video directed by Omar for "Polaridad" was released the day following the album's digital release.

== Track listing ==
All tracks are written by Omar Rodríguez-López.

No.	Title	Length
1.	"Los Siete Sermones a los Muertos"	4:07
2.	"Polaridad"	4:51
3.	"La Paradoja Divina"	3:02
4.	"Contra Suspiros"	3:00
5.	"El Todo"	4:40
6.	"Piedras y Ansiedad"	6:03
7.	"El Ritual Como Fin En Si Mismo"	3:01
8.	"Consecuencias"	3:01
Total length:		31:52

== Personnel ==
- Ximena Sariñana Rivera – vocals, lyrics
- Omar Rodríguez-López – sequencers, programming, synths, xylophone, voice
- Marcel Rodriguez-Lopez – Mellotron
- Elvin Estela – programming, additional production, bass

== Release history ==
Region	Date	Label	Format
Various	September 14, 2010	Rodriguez Lopez Productions	Digital download
Europe	November 18, 2010	Rodriguez Lopez Productions	LP, CD
United Kingdom	December 2023	Clouds Hill	LP
