= El Bien y Mal Nos Une =

Studio album by Omar Rodríguez-López
- Released: September 23, 2016
- Recorded: 2009—2012
- Genre: Experimental rock, dub, electronica
- Length: 35:51
- Label: Ipecac Recordings
- Producer: Omar Rodríguez-López

Omar Rodríguez-López solo chronology
Umbrella Mistress (2016)	El Bien y Mal Nos Une (2016)	Cell Phone Bikini (2016)

Omar Rodríguez-López chronology
Antemasque (2014)	El Bien y Mal Nos Une (2016)	Crystal Fairy (2017)

El Bien y Mal Nos Une (transl. Good and Evil Unite Us) is the thirty-second studio album by Omar Rodríguez-López as a solo artist, released on 23 September 2016. It is his sixth release in the 12 album series initiated by Ipecac Recordings. The majority of the album features Deantoni Parks on drums with the exception of "Perdido" which is performed by The Mars Volta frontman Cedric Bixler-Zavala.

== Background ==
The album was primarily recorded years prior which is presumably why Deantoni Parks performs on the majority it. Furthermore, it features several remixed (and partially re-recorded) versions of songs originally released in 2010 on Un Escorpión Perfumado under different titles: "Acuérdate" (previously "Que Dice Pessoa?"), "Amor Frío" (previously "Incesto O Pasión?"), "Humor Sufi" (previously "Estrangular el Extranjero") and "Yo Soy La Destrucción"/"Planetas Sin Sol" (previously "Mensaje Imputente"/"El Diablo y la Tierra"). "Amor Frío" would go on to be released again as a rearranged version on Rodríguez-López's fiftieth studio album, Is It the Clouds?

Clouds Hill, who rereleased the album on vinyl, describes the record thusly: "An alternative version of Omar's records [sic] 'Un Escorpión Perfumado', full of deep thoughts about life and death."

"Un Acto De Fe" was uploaded in advance as the album's single.

== Reception ==
The Quietus was favorable toward the album, describing it as "sinister…altogether darker [than Escorpion]…ruthless…arrives like a nuclear strike…abetting a restlessness and dread that abounds throughout the record…punishes with implied violence." The online magazine also praises Parks' drumming on the record. Verbicide, however, describes El Bien y Mal Nos Une as "a collection of catchy choruses wrapped up in funky synths and your not-so-standard sampler sounds." Mxdwn Music was more middling toward the album, mentioning that it might be too unconventional, dissonant, and avant-garde for the average listener, although they do delineate it as thoughtful and intelligent.

Heavy Pop gave El Bien y Mal Nos Une a rating of 6/10, stating that it's "strangely laid-back yet simultaneously enormously hyperactive, constantly switching between calmly marveling at its own synth landscapes and frenetically motivated bounding ahead. It's somewhere like experimental pop for Latin American space stations – incredibly densely woven yet breathing artificial air." Lastly, The Music gave the album a rating of 5/5, who also praises Deantoni Parks' drumming and also the electronic influence.

== Track listing ==
All tracks are written by Omar Rodríguez-López.

No.	Title	Length
1.	"Violencia Cotidiana"	3:41
2.	"Acuérdate"	4:34
3.	"Un Acto De Fe"	4:01
4.	"Amor Frío"	3:44
5.	"Perdido"	3:11
6.	"Humor Sufí"	5:08
7.	"La Voz"	2:35
8.	"Yo Soy La Destrucción"	4:55
9.	"Planetas Sin Sol"	2:22
10.	"Estrella Caída"	1:50
Total length:		35:51

== Personnel ==
- Omar Rodríguez-López – vocals, guitars, sequences, synths, percussion
- Deantoni Parks – drums
- Marcel Rodríguez-López – keys, percussion
- Teri Gender Bender – backing vocals
- Cedric Bixler-Zavala – drums (track 5)

=== Production ===
- Omar Rodríguez-López – producer
- Lars Stalfors – recording
- Jon Debaun – recording
- Shawn Sullivan – recording
- Chris Common – mixing, mastering
- Flo Siller – mastering (vinyl)
- Chris von Rautenkranz – mastering (vinyl)

=== Artwork ===
- Adán Guevara – art and layout

== Release history ==
Region	Date	Label	Format
Worldwide	September 23, 2016	Ipecac Recordings	Digital download
Worldwide	January 19, 2024	Clouds Hill	Vinyl LP
