= Is It the Clouds? =

Studio album by Omar Rodríguez-López
- Released: January 19, 2024
- Recorded: 2018
- Genres: Latin, art-pop, art rock, folk, jazz fusion, experimental
- Length: 28:48
- Label: Clouds Hill
- Producers: Jon Debaun; Violeta Felix

Omar Rodríguez-López solo chronology
Live at Clouds Hill (2024)	Is It the Clouds? (2024)

Omar Rodríguez-López chronology
Diamanté (2017)	Is It the Clouds? (2024)	Lucro Sucio; Los Ojos del Vacio (2025)

Is it the Clouds? is the fiftieth studio album by Omar Rodríguez-López as a solo artist, released on January 19, 2024. It was originally released on December 4, 2023, as part of the Amor de Frances vinyl box set. The album features ten tracks which were recorded in 2018 after Rodríguez-López took a break from recording. The multi-instrumentalist stated that the record is tied to the passing of his mother.

== Overview ==
Is It the Clouds? has been described as "compact, exploring shadowy art-pop and sparse acoustic balladry." A few genres are interspersed throughout the record, such as Latin, folk, art rock, and jazz elements. Rodríguez-López wrote the album out of grief, years after the passing of his mother, stating, "The record has a lot to do with the passing of my mother, but it is not as brutal as it would have been if I had done it back when she actually died. There was enough distance between me and when it happened."

Rodríguez-López describes the album as a paradox and that it has a bipolar feeling. He further mentions that the record evokes a sense of losing where one came from and thinking it will destroy them, but ultimately it makes one feel like a human being.

"Amor Frio" was originally released on El Bien y Mal Nos Une in 2016, but serves as an alternate version on Is It the Clouds?. "Your Own Worst Enemy" was the only single released. The only known performers on the album are Rodríguez-López, Marcel Rodríguez-López, and Jon Debaun.

== Reception ==
Salad Days Magazine gave the album an 8/10, calling it "elegant and thoughtfully structured." White Room Reviews praised the album while describing it as a gentle ride and ignoring expectations. Visions Magazine rated it 8/12 and compliments the title track and "Gently Tamed." Plattentests gave a mixed review and commented how some songs could use more polishing. Mondo Sonoro calls Is It the Clouds? "austere, as is the album's overall approach—a minimalist record, especially considering ORL's fascination with the baroque and sonic drama. This drama is certainly present in these ten tracks; it's simply approached from a deeply intimate perspective."

== Track listing ==
All tracks are written by Omar Rodríguez-López.

No.	Title	Length
1.	"Is It The Clouds?"	3:11
2.	"Mere Centimeter"	4:34
3.	"Gently Tamed"	2:45
4.	"Rat Pain"	3:38
5.	"Once A Broken Human"	2:20
6.	"Amor Frio"	3:05
7.	"Which Came First"	3:08
8.	"Your Own Worst Enemy"	2:38
9.	"Solving This Again"	2:25
10.	"Broken (Reprise)"	1:04
Total length:		28:48

== Personnel ==
- Omar Rodríguez-López – vocals, guitars, additional contributions
- Marcel Rodríguez-López – performer
- Jon Debaun – performer

=== Technical ===
- Jon Debaun – producer, recording
- Violeta Felix – producer
- Omar Rodríguez-López – writer, recording
- Adan Guevara – artwork and layout

== Release history ==
Region	Date	Label	Format
Worldwide	December 4, 2023	Clouds Hill	LP (box set)
Worldwide	January 19, 2024	Clouds Hill	LP
