= Zapopan (album) =

Studio album by Omar Rodríguez-López
- Released: November 18, 2016
- Recorded: 2007–2012
- Genre: Experimental rock
- Length: 35:33
- Label: Ipecac
- Producer: Omar Rodríguez-López

Omar Rodríguez-López solo chronology
Weekly Mansions (2016)	Zapopan (2016)	Nom de Guerre Cabal (2016)

Omar Rodríguez-López chronology
Antemasque (2014)	Zapopan (2016)	Crystal Fairy (2017)

Professional ratings
Review scores
Source	Rating
Canoe.ca	3/5 stars
Exclaim!	7/10

Zapopan is the thirty-sixth studio album by Omar Rodríguez-López as a solo artist, released on 18 November 2016. It is his tenth release in the 12-album series initiated by Ipecac Recordings.

Zapopan features reworked/remixed and re-titled versions of songs which were originally released on Saber, Querer, Osar y Callar (2012) and Unicorn Skeleton Mask (2013). The album title refers to the city Rodríguez-López lived in at the time of recording. Most of the remaining songs from Unicorn Skeleton Mask appeared on Zen Thrills in 2017.

"Spell Broken Hearts" was uploaded in advance as the album's single. It then appeared alongside "Tentáculos de fé" on the 2017 live album Chocolate Tumor Hormone Parade.

== Track listing ==
All songs written by Omar Rodríguez-López.

No.	Title	Length
1.	"Reap the Roots"	2:11
2.	"Tandem Happiness"	1:08
3.	"Fielding Souls"	1:37
4.	"What's Left in You"	3:20
5.	"Spell Broken Hearts"	4:00
6.	"If It Was a Snake It Would Have Bit You"	4:16
7.	"Hollow Change"	2:18
8.	"Archangel"	2:51
9.	"Harboring a Sadist"	4:30
10.	"Tentáculos De Fé"	3:41
11.	"Random Bouts of Shadows"	5:41
Total length:		35:33

Notes

- Tracks 1–3: previously released as "Happiness" on Unicorn Skeleton Mask.
- Track 4: previously released as "Sea is Rising" on Unicorn Skeleton Mask (another version also appeared on Corazones).
- Track 5: previously released as "Spellbound" on Saber, Querer, Osar y Callar.
- Track 6: previously released as "Maria te Canta" on Unicorn Skeleton Mask.
- Tracks 7–8: previously released as "Home Lost"/"Habits" on Saber, Querer, Osar y Callar.
- Track 9: previously released as "Careful Me" on Unicorn Skeleton Mask
- Track 10: previously released as "Tentáculos" on Saber, Querer, Osar y Callar (another version also appeared on Un Escorpión Perfumado as "Agua Dulce de Pulpo").
- Track 11: previously released as "Storm Shadow" on Unicorn Skeleton Mask

== Personnel ==
- Omar Rodríguez-López – vocals, guitars, bass, synthesizers, sequencing, piano, samples, engineering
- Deantoni Parks – drums

=== Production ===
- Jon Debaun – engineering
- Shawn Sullivan – engineering
- Chris Common – mixing, mastering
- Mackie – layout

== Release history ==
Region	Date	Label	Format
Various	November 18, 2016	Ipecac	Digital download
United Kingdom	December 2023	Clouds Hill	LP
