= The Bedlam in Goliath =

Studio album by the Mars Volta
- Released: January 29, 2008
- Recorded: 2006–2007
- Studios: Ocean Way Recording (Hollywood, California) and Rodriguez-Lopez's home studio in Brooklyn, New York
- Genres: Progressive rock; jazz fusion; funk rock; math rock; progressive metal
- Length: 75:52
- Labels: Universal Motown; GSL
- Producer: Omar Rodríguez-López

The Mars Volta chronology
Amputechture (2006)	The Bedlam in Goliath (2008)	Octahedron (2009)

Singles from The Bedlam in Goliath
- 1. "Wax Simulacra" Released: November 19, 2007; 2. "Goliath (USB single)" Released: April 7, 2008

The Bedlam in Goliath is the fourth studio album by American progressive rock band the Mars Volta, released on January 29, 2008, on Gold Standard Laboratories and Universal Motown Records. Produced by guitarist and songwriter Omar Rodríguez-López, the album's creation was fraught with strange occurrences after an experience with a ouija that Rodriguez-Lopez bought as a gift for vocalist Cedric Bixler-Zavala. The album is their first to feature drummer Thomas Pridgen, and the last to include guitarist and sound manipulator Paul Hinojos, wind multi-instrumentalist Adrián Terrazas-González, and keyboardist Isaiah "Ikey" Owens.

The album debuted at No. 3 on the Billboard 200, becoming the band's highest-charting release after selling over 54,000 copies in its opening week. As of June 2009 it has sold 153,000 copies in United States. "Wax Simulacra" was released on November 19, 2007, as the album's first single, coupled with a cover version of "Pulled to Bits", originally by Siouxsie and the Banshees. Vinyl editions of the album include a ouija inside the gatefold, claimed to be the band's own take on the board they previously owned. "Wax Simulacra" won at the 51st Grammy Awards for Best Hard Rock Performance.

Having previously contributed the artwork to the 2006 release of Amputechture, Jeff Jordan was again brought in to handle the illustrations for the album, creating 11 original paintings to coincide with the theme of The Bedlam in Goliath, as well as including a piece from his own gallery. The piece used for the cover is entitled "Agadez".

== Production ==
=== Background ===
On a trip in Jerusalem, Rodriguez-Lopez purchased an archaic Ouija-type talking board at a curio shop as a gift for Bixler-Zavala. They would return to their tour bus after shows to play with it during their 2006 tour with the Red Hot Chili Peppers, as it quickly became the band's post-show ritual. Dubbed "The Soothsayer", the board revealed stories, gave names and made demands, as the band was contacted by three different people who appeared in the form of one, who was then referred to as "Goliath". The more the band interacted with "The Soothsayer", otherworldly coincidences began plaguing the band's experience writing and recording The Bedlam in Goliath. Blake Fleming, their drummer at the time, was let go from the band mid-tour; Bixler-Zavala wound up needing surgery performed on his foot due to the shoes he had been wearing, forcing him to relearn how to walk post-surgery; audio tracks sporadically disappeared from the studio's hard drives; Rodriguez-Lopez's home studio flooded and was subject to multiple power outages; and the album's original engineer went through a nervous breakdown, leaving behind all previous work with no notes as to where anything was. The engineer who quit stated to Rodriguez-Lopez: "I'm not going to help you make this record. You're trying to do something very bad with this record, you're trying to make me crazy and you're trying to make people crazy."

Rodriguez-Lopez was on the brink of starting the recording from scratch, but eventually kept on after recruiting Robert Carranza as a replacement engineer, along with assistance from Lars Stalfors and Isaiah Abolin. Midway through the recording sessions, Rodriguez-Lopez broke "The Soothsayer" in half and buried it in an undisclosed location as an attempt to undo the curse and halt the unforeseen tragedies. Rodriguez-Lopez swore never to give away the location of the burial, and also asked the band not to speak of it again during the remainder of the album's production. It is debated whether the story about the Ouija-type board and its subsequent calamities are ultimately fictitious, due in part to the fact that Bizzaro fiction author Jeremy Robert Johnson penned the narrative in question as a short story.

The song Soothsayer contains field recordings that Omar recorded in Jerusalem. The recordings are a mixture from the Jewish quarter, the Muslim Quarter and the Christian Quarter. Lyrics from Conjugal Burns are found in the De-Loused in the Comatorium short story and were also performed by Bixler-Zavala years prior in live versions of Eriatarka.

=== Recording process ===
Recorded and mixed at Ocean Way Studios in Hollywood and Rodriguez-Lopez's home studio in Brooklyn, New York, song material for The Bedlam in Goliath dates back to April 2006 when demos were first written. Without a stable studio drummer after the three consecutive losses of Jon Theodore, Blake Fleming and Deantoni Parks in a single year, the band was introduced to then 24-year-old Thomas Pridgen, whose youthful presence—as described by Bixler-Zavala—had given the Mars Volta new life. Rodriguez-Lopez worked with Rich Costey to finish the album in a three-week stretch, assisted by Shawn Michael Sullivan and Claudius Mittendorfer as editors.

In an interview, Carranza described the recording process for The Bedlam in Goliath stating that no more than three takes an hour were recorded, as a way to soak in what was recorded and to hear the differences, which in turn improved the general mood and atmosphere of the album's creation. Elaborating on the method, Carranza stated that "when van Gogh was around he wasn't just painting, painting, painting. I'm sure he took a step back once in a while. You should do the same when you're recording."

The string quintet on "Soothsayer" was recorded on Wednesday, June 6, 2007, at Hyde Street Studios in San Francisco.

Eventually the band decided in favor of "Wax Simulacra" as the first single:

Originally, the label wanted to introduce the LP with the track "Goliath", but the band wouldn't have it. "'Goliath' is about nine, ten minutes long, and the end of it is so interesting, we didn't really want it to be used as a single", [Cedric] said. "It kept getting butchered and came off really bad."

=== Themes ===
Bixler-Zavala incorporated themes and names into the lyrics that were taken from messages given by "The Soothsayer". It also includes excerpts from poems that were found attached to the ouija, describing a love triangle between a woman, her daughter and a man in a Muslim society, along with an honor killing involving these people. Each song reinterprets the relationship in some shape or form, and as a good luck charm to counteract the cryptic themes, Bixler-Zavala incorporated elements of the Afro-Caribbean religious tradition Santería into the lyrics as a "protective skin" to protect the band.

The album ultimately serves as an attempt to artistically reverse their perceived bad luck by "setting traps" for the listeners to use as a way to undo what "The Soothsayer" had brought upon the band. To aid the concept, vinyl editions of the album contain the band's own version of the ouija inside the gatefold.

== Promotion ==
=== Webisodes ===
Four webisodes were posted on the Mars Volta's official website, depicting the band in various and sometimes humorous situations.

- "Wax Simulacra" contains live footage of the band performing on their Australian 2007 Tour.
- "Aberinkula" is based around the band playing cards and then performing surgery on a person, finding odd objects inside of the body.
- "Goliath" consists of the band performing on obscure instruments in the middle of a street, with Cedric dressed like the Elephant Man.
- "Askepios" is made up of footage of a celebration party that takes place in front of a green screen. Several props and objects appearing in the other videos (including a piñata bearing the effigy of George W. Bush) are passed around and examined during the celebration.
- "Ilyena" was posted at Dailymotion, showing footage of the band in a classroom with Rodriguez-Lopez introducing Adrián Terrazas-González, who appears as a police officer to lecture to the class. The last half of the video shows everyone on a rooftop watching as graffiti artists Grey and Thomas Pridgen spray paint their tags on a wall.

=== 2008 club tour ===
A ticket presale was announced on the band's website for a New Year's Eve show at the Bill Graham Civic Auditorium in San Francisco, California, promoted with flyers that featured exclusive The Bedlam in Goliath artwork illustrated by Jeff Jordan. The band would then announce a following January club tour in 2008 where they would then debut new material from the album for the first time prior to its release.

=== Goliath The Soothsayer (Video Game) ===
As a promotional-tie in Goliath The Soothsayer is a 2008 point-and-click flash horror game created by Ben Leffler. The 'Author Comments' on the site are as follows:

"Based on a true story from the mighty Mars Volta, Leffler Web Design in conjunction with Universal Records and Rodriguez Lopez Productions presents "Goliath The Soothsayer" - a tale which follows a supernatural mystery in the point-n-click style of the horror-pioneering flash game "Exmortis".

After the mysterious disappearance of your brother, you had been appointed to tend to his estate. But from the moment you entered his house, strange inexplicable things began to happen. And then one morning you woke up locked in the attic, held captive by a malevolent force. Work your way through the mystery behind your brother's disappearance and try to escape the fate that befell him months earlier.

If you like the game, then support the Mars Volta by ordering their album "The Bedlam in Goliath" from Amazon.com."

== Reception ==
Professional ratings
Aggregate scores
Source	Rating
Metacritic	66/100
Review scores
Source	Rating
AbsolutePunk	85%
AllMusic	4.5/5 stars
The A.V. Club	C−
Drowned in Sound	8/10
Entertainment Weekly	B
NME	4/5 stars
Pitchfork	4.3/10
PopMatters	6/10
Rolling Stone	4/5 stars
Spin	4/10

The album has a score of 66 out of 100 from Metacritic, indicating "generally favorable reviews". Jason Pettigrew of Alternative Press gave the album all five stars and called it "the first great record of 2008". John Hanson of Sputnikmusic gave the album a score of 4.5 out of five and called it "simply an immense album". Uncut gave it a score of four stars out of five and called it the band's "most digestible record yet". Blender also gave it a score of four stars out of five and said, "Never before have these kings of experimental metal sustained such pulse-quickening energy, honing their tricks—cryptic lyrics, cliffhanging cries, spine-twisting rhythms—into a screaming arrow of sound." Gary Graff of Billboard gave it a favorable review and said, "Most of the time, however, the band makes a righteous racket that straddles the worlds of prog rock, funk, fusion jazz and world music, with Eastern motifs spicing 'Aberinkula' and a bit of cosmic blues making its way into 'Conjugal Burns'." Vibe likewise gave it four stars out of five and said, "Rarely does rock music feel so simultaneously orchestrated and raw." Shilpa Ganatra of Hot Press gave it a positive review and said, "The manner in which the group weave complex musical tapestries is certainly impressive from a purely technical perspective, but you suspect that they were a lot more fun to assemble than they are to listen to."

Other reviews are average, mixed or negative: Q gave it a score of three stars out of five and said "There's greater scope here [more] than ever before, with the gentle Ilyena providing space before Cavaletta's riot of detuned radios, car alarms and struggling internet connections." The Observer also gave it a score of three stars out of five and said, "The converted will no doubt welcome their current interest in Middle Eastern superstition, plus intricate tunes such as 'The Second Coming'. Outsiders, however, may remain sceptical." Under the Radar gave it a score of five stars out of ten and said it "ultimately sounds like The Mars Volta, nothing more and nothing less." Andy Beta of Paste gave the album two-and-a-half stars out of five and said that "even the highest highs soon crash and dissipate, wallowing once more in a proggy bog." Austin Powell of The Austin Chronicle also gave the album two-and-a-half stars out of five and called it "a black hole of esoteric expressionism, as baffling as it is brilliant". Travis Woods of Prefix Magazine also gave it a mixed review and called it "rut music and The Mars Volta are still stuck in it; even if they've managed to avoiding digging themselves any deeper with Goliath's frenetic lateral slides into pseudo bedlam, momentum is only momentum if you’re going somewhere." Hipster of Tiny Mix Tapes gave it a score of two stars out of five and called it "an exhausting and overwhelming effort that fails to leave any tangible impression". Jason Keller of Now also gave it two stars out of five and said the Mars Volta "sound like a band becoming a bit too comfortable in their niche".

Dave Simpson of The Guardian gave the album only one star out of five and said, "The 'songs' (a relative concept on planet Mars Volta) sound as though they are competing to unleash as many prog-rock cliches as possible: portentous guitar riffs and twiddly bits are interspersed with all manner of atonal wind instruments and sonic pomposities." Dave Hughes of Slant Magazine also gave the album a score of one star out of five and said that it sadly "takes sound and fury, signifying nothing, to new depths".

== Track listing ==
All lyrics written by Cedric Bixler-Zavala, all music composed by Omar Rodríguez-López.

No.	Title	Length
1.	"Aberinkula"	5:45
2.	"Metatron"	8:12
3.	"Ilyena"	5:36
4.	"Wax Simulacra"	2:39
5.	"Goliath"	7:15
6.	"Tourniquet Man"	2:38
7.	"Cavalettas"	9:32
8.	"Agadez"	6:44
9.	"Askepios"	5:11
10.	"Ouroboros"	6:36
11.	"Soothsayer"	9:08
12.	"Conjugal Burns"	6:36
Total length:		75:52

Bonus tracks and B-sides
No.	Title	Length
1.	"Back Up Against the Wall" (Circle Jerks cover; previously available on the Mars Volta's official website as a digital download)	1:34
2.	"Birthday" (The Sugarcubes cover; available on the Japanese bonus DVD and from Best Buy as a bonus download)	4:20
3.	"Candy and a Currant Bun" (Pink Floyd cover; available on the UK, AUS, and NZ versions of the album. Also from US independent record stores as a VinylDisc single)	2:20
4.	"Pulled to Bits" (Siouxsie and the Banshees cover; available on the "Wax Simulacra" single and from Best Buy as a bonus download)	3:27
5.	"Memories" (Soft Machine cover; available on the Japanese bonus DVD and on iTunes as a bonus track)	3:04
6.	"Things Behind the Sun" (Nick Drake cover; available on the Japanese bonus DVD and on iTunes as a bonus track)	4:07
7.	"Mr. Muggs" (bonus 7" single released with vinyl edition of the album)	3:15
8.	"Cygnus....Vismund Cygnus (Live)" (Available from Best Buy as a live DVD)	20:21

Demos
No.	Title	Length
1.	"GetMadRef" ("Agadez" demo. Available through USB stick on December 29, 2008.)	5:54
2.	"Ratiplet for Label" ("Soothsayer" demo. Available through USB stick on December 29, 2008.)	4:52

=== Notes ===
- An aberinkula is a special kind of drum used in Nigeria. Also, "aberinkula" can be translated as "non-believer".
- Metatron is the name of an angel in Judaism and some branches of Christianity. It is also considered to harbor the voice of God.
- Ilyena is a reference to Ilyena Vasilievna Mironov, which is the birth name of actress Dame Helen Mirren. "I've named a song 'Ilyena' after the real name of the actress Helen Mirren because she is my favorite actress and the song is a little lighthearted and different from the subject matter."
- The word "simulacrum" is used to describe a representation of another thing, such as a statue or a painting; especially of a god. It also describes an image without the substance or qualities of the original. Simulacra is the plural form of the word.
- Goliath is a Philistine warrior mentioned in the Hebrew Bible. He is famous for his battle in the 11th century BC that he lost against David, the young Israelite boy who had already been chosen by God and anointed by Samuel to become the King of Israel.
- Goliath contains lyrics from a gospel hymn called "I Never Heard a Man Speak Like This Man Before". This hymn was also regularly sung at Jonestown about the cult leader Jim Jones.
- "Una cavaletta" is said to be a woman who constantly tries to change her lover into some fantasy she has conjured.
- Agadez is the largest city in northern Niger.
- Askepios is named after the Greek medicine god, Asclepius.
- The Ouroboros is an ancient symbol depicting a serpent or dragon swallowing its own tail and forming a circle. This symbol represents the cyclic nature of life and the infinity. It is spelled as "Ouroborous" on the album's track listing, but this is likely to be a printing error as the Mars Volta's official website and the ASCAP website both list the track as "Ouroboros".
- A soothsayer is one who predicts future events based on personal beliefs instead of common reasoning.
- The word "Conjugal" means anything that relates to marriage or the relationship between a married couple.
- The inner booklet features a series of images commonly known as the "Seven Powers of Africa".

== Personnel ==
- Omar Rodríguez-López – guitar, synthesizers
- Cedric Bixler-Zavala – vocals
- Isaiah Ikey Owens – keyboards
- Juan Alderete – bass
- Thomas Pridgen – drums
- John Frusciante – guitar
- Marcel Rodriguez-Lopez – percussion, keyboards
- Adrián Terrazas-González – flute, tenor saxophone, soprano saxophone, bass clarinet, percussion
- Paul Hinojos – sound manipulation

Additional musicians

- Henry Trejo – "Because"s on "Agadez"
- Nathaniel Tookey – string composition and arrangement on "Soothsayer"
- Edwin Outwater – strings conductor on "Soothsayer"
- Sam Bass – cello on "Soothsayer"
- Edwin Huizinga – violin on "Soothsayer"
- Charith Premawardhana – viola on "Soothsayer"
- Anthony Blea – violin on "Soothsayer"
- Owen Levine – double bass on "Soothsayer"
- Kim Humphreys – violin on "Mr. Muggs" (uncredited)

Recording personnel

- Omar Rodríguez-López – producer, recording
- Howie Weinberg – mastering
- Rich Costey – mixing
- Charlie Stavish – mixing assistant
- Isaiah Abolin – recording
- Lars Stalfors – recording
- Robert Carranza – recording
- Claudius Mittendorfer – editing
- Shaun Sullivan – editing
- Edwin Outwater – strings conductor (track 11)
- Justin Phelps – strings recording (track 11)
- Chris von Rautenkranz – mastering (vinyl)
- Florian Siller – mastering (vinyl)

== Charts ==
Chart (2008)	Peak position
Australian Albums (ARIA)	3
Austrian Albums (Ö3 Austria)	46
Belgian Albums (Ultratop Flanders)	35
Canadian Albums (Billboard)	6
Dutch Albums (Album Top 100)	42
Finnish Albums (Suomen virallinen lista)	9
French Albums (SNEP)	87
German Albums (Offizielle Top 100)	29
Italian Albums (FIMI)	42
Irish Albums (IRMA)	57
Japanese Albums (Oricon)	22
Mexican Albums (Top 100 Mexico)	47
New Zealand Albums (RMNZ)	13
Norwegian Albums (VG-lista)	10
Spanish Albums (Promusicae)	58
Swedish Albums (Sverigetopplistan)	32
Swiss Albums (Schweizer Hitparade)	57
UK Albums (Official Charts)	42
US Billboard 200	3
