= Sworn Virgins =

Studio album by Omar Rodríguez-López
- Released: July 15, 2016
- Recorded: 2013
- Genre: Experimental rock
- Length: 35:44
- Labels: Ipecac Recordings, ORL Projects
- Producers: Omar Rodríguez-López, Deantoni Parks

Omar Rodríguez-López solo chronology
¿Sólo Extraño? (2013)	Sworn Virgins (2016)	Corazones (2016)

Omar Rodríguez-López chronology
Antemasque (2014)	Sworn Virgins (2016)	Crystal Fairy (2017)

Professional ratings
Review scores
Source	Rating
PopMatters	7/10 stars

Sworn Virgins is the twenty-seventh studio album by Omar Rodríguez-López as a solo artist, his first in more than 3 years and first to be released through Ipecac Recordings. Due to an error, Sworn Virgins accidentally leaked through Rhapsody on June 24, 2016, three weeks before its official release date (July 15). On July 7, 2016, it was announced that Sworn Virgins would be the first in the series of 12 records Ipecac would be releasing as digital downloads, fortnightly throughout the remainder of 2016. Limited CD pressings and a possible limited edition CD/LP box set containing all 12 records were also in the plans.

According to Rodriguez-Lopez, Sworn Virgins was one of the last solo albums he recorded before deciding that he "wanted to dedicate my time, while I'm still here, to collaborating with people and being a part of something and sharing things". It prominently features The Mars Volta & Bosnian Rainbows drummer Deantoni Parks, who used his drum/keyboard setup (as seen in Bosnian Rainbows and throughout his solo work). Much of the album was tracked live, often in a single take, with Rodriguez-Lopez using looper to sample his parts as well as an octaver to recreate a bass sound on guitar.

The first two tracks (and their titles) form one single composition, as do tracks 7 & 8 and 10 & 11. "Saturine" samples Invisible's "Durazno Sangrando," while "Crow's Feet" samples John Lennon's line "those freaks" from "How Do You Sleep?"

Music videos for "To Kill A Chi Chi" and "Pineapple Face, Not Even a Toad Loves You" were released on YouTube. Each record of the Ipecac Series was preceded by the release of a single for streaming and as pre-order incentive, and as such "To Kill A Chi Chi" was uploaded in advance as the album's single. It also went on to be re-recorded by Omar in 2018 and released on July 24, 2020 as part of The Clouds Hill Tapes Parts I, II & III.

== Track listing ==
No.	Title	Length
1.	"Pineapple Face"	2:26
2.	"Not Even Toad Loves You"	4:34
3.	"To Kill A Chi Chi"	3:19
4.	"Trick Harpoon Stare Of Baby"	3:50
5.	"High Water Hell"	4:15
6.	"Saturine"	2:08
7.	"Crow's Feet"	4:34
8.	"Heart Mistakes"	2:21
9.	"Logged Into Bliss"	3:28
10.	"Fortuna"	1:27
11.	"Twice A Plague"	3:22
Total length:		35:44

== Personnel ==
- Omar Rodríguez-López – vocals, guitars, synthesizers, loops
- Deantoni Parks – drums, keyboards, sampling
- Jon Debaun – engineering
- Chris Common – engineering, mixing, mastering
- Elyn Kazarian – art
- Mackie – layout

== Release history ==
Region	Date	Label	Format
Worldwide	July 15, 2016	Ipecac Recordings	Digital download
Worldwide	TBA	Ipecac Recordings	CD
Worldwide	January 19, 2024	Clouds Hill Recordings	Vinyl
