= Octahedron (album) =

Studio album by The Mars Volta
- Released: June 23, 2009
- Recorded: 2007, August 2008
- Studios: 99 Sutton Street in Brooklyn, New York
- Genres: Progressive rock; experimental rock
- Length: 50:03
- Labels: Warner Bros.; Mercury
- Producer: Omar Rodríguez-López

The Mars Volta chronology
The Bedlam in Goliath (2008)	Octahedron (2009)	Noctourniquet (2012)

Singles from Octahedron
- 1. "Cotopaxi" Released: June 15, 2009; 2. "Since We've Been Wrong" Released: June 26, 2009

Octahedron is the fifth full-length studio album by American progressive rock band the Mars Volta, released on June 23, 2009. The album was released by Warner Bros. Records in North America and Mercury Records worldwide. It is the last studio album to feature drummer Thomas Pridgen and guitarist John Frusciante, and the first not to feature contributions from keyboardist Isaiah "Ikey" Owens. Previous members multi-instrumentalist Adrián Terrazas-González and guitarist and sound manipulator Paul Hinojos are also absent from the album.

Regarding the release, vocalist Cedric Bixler-Zavala states that the band "wanted to make the opposite of all the records we've done. All along we've threatened people that we'd make a pop record, and now we have."

It debuted at number 12 on the Billboard 200 albums chart with sales of 29,980 in its first week of release. As of March 2012, it has sold 84,000 copies in United States.

== Development ==
Omar Rodríguez-López started working on Octahedron in 2007 at the same time as The Bedlam in Goliath, in his typical fashion of working on two or three projects simultaneously. Yet, as Bedlam turned into a "nightmare of a record to make", Rodriguez was unable to sustain both projects and devoted his attention on Bedlam.

In October 2007, a 30-second clip of a new song was leaked onto the Internet, originally assumed to be from the upcoming The Bedlam in Goliath. Later, the song (unofficially named "Beneath the Eyelids" by the fans) was played live by the band at the New Year's Eve show in San Francisco at the end of the acoustic set, introduced by Cedric Bixler-Zavala as "the song that we worked on that hasn't come out yet". The song eventually ended up on Octahedron as "Since We've Been Wrong".

Rodriguez had discussed the band's next album (then untitled) as early as January 2008, the month that The Bedlam in Goliath was released, claiming "I consider it to be our acoustic album." Bixler-Zavala has also spoken of the album as "acoustic" and "mellow," yet stated: "We know how people can be so linear in their way of thinking, so when they hear the new album, they're going to say, 'This is not an acoustic album! There's electricity throughout it!' But it's our version. That's what our band does — celebrate mutations. It's our version of what we consider an acoustic album."

The album was finished in three weeks during the month of August 2008, in Brooklyn, New York. The recording sessions did not feature saxophonist Adrián Terrazas-González and rhythm-guitarist/sound manipulator Paul Hinojos; after the band finished touring in support of Bedlam, Omar Rodriguez-Lopez asked both to leave the band. The Mars Volta's official website stated that both "did so amicably." Regarding their departure, percussionist/keyboardist Marcel Rodríguez-López noted that: "it's like we got a whole new band. It's two less members — we got to play differently."

The song "Teflon" is based on Rodriguez-Lopez's solo piece "A Story Teeth Rotted For", recorded back in 2001 and released on Absence Makes the Heart Grow Fungus in September 2008.

Shortly after the album's release, Rodriguez-Lopez had hinted at Octahedron being the final album he records in his typical "gun-in-your-face mentality" where he would give musicians their parts without giving them any knowledge of how they fit into the greater song. However, he chose to continue with this technique for the band's subsequent album, Noctourniquet, stating it would be the last album he records that way.

== Themes ==
Similar to the band's third studio album, Amputechture, the album does not contain a single unifying narrative. In an interview, Cedric Bixler-Zavala elaborated on the album's themes, saying "Lyrically, I wanted to incorporate elements of traditional songs. So that it would sound like our world had these handed down, traditional songs that were to do with real random vanishings and kidnappings. That is a big part of Latin culture. People get kidnapped all the time. I wanted to cover everything. Right from the exhilarating feeling you get when you put the ransom note down, the adrenaline rush when you realise a loved one has been taken from you, followed by that bleak, dismal area of not knowing what to do. Especially if you don't come from money. We had two friends that we knew from Texas who just randomly vanished. We've never known whether they just took off or if they met foul play. I found it an interesting subject matter to tackle. I wanted the lyrics to instil that bleak feeling you can get from living somewhere like El Paso. Even though I haven't lived at home for ages, it's still with me. The stories that come from across the border still hit home really hard. I just wanted to have a soundtrack for that really."

In an interview with Revolver, Bixler-Zavala discussed the theme of "Teflon": "I had been writing the lyrics and sort of testing the waters of how much I could say if McCain had won the election. I don't usually write anything about things like that. I think 'Teflon' is my favorite because it kind of has that slacker attitude of someone who doesn't vote but at the same time is giving a fuck. I think a lot of people could maybe understand that." In this same interview, it was pointed out that the introduction of "Halo of Nembutals" contains a sample of a Jeremy Michael Ward recording, dating back to 2003, the year of his death.

The song "With Twilight as My Guide" appears to take place during the Salem Witch Trials, which is revealed through an interview with opera singer Renée Fleming, who covered the song on her album Dark Hope: "I was especially fascinated by the Mars Volta song, 'With Twilight As My Guide', which is operatic in its scale and musical complexity. I was however a bit concerned about the text, specifically the reference to 'devil daughters'. I said, 'As much as I love this song, I really can't sing it for that reason.' Peter Mensch offered to contact Cedric Bixler-Zavala and asked if the text could be changed, since the overall meaning of the song wasn't completely clear anyway. Cedric responded, "Sure, she can change it. I would just like it to be known that in no way is the lyric supposed to paint women in a bad light... The song feels like it was written during the Salem Witch Trials, and it sarcastically takes the religious right wing slang of how all women were treated. Our last album, Bedlam in Goliath, was one huge metaphor for the way women are treated in Islamic society (honor killings, etc) not just a story about a ouija board... it's meant to make you question the way things are."

== Promotion ==
On April 22, 2009, the album's first single, "Cotopaxi", was played as the "hottest record in the world" for that day on the Zane Lowe BBC Radio One show.

An e-mail sent to people who had signed up to The Mars Volta's newsletter on May 16 confirmed details of the album and provided a link streaming four songs ("Since We've Been Wrong," "Cotopaxi," "With Twilight as My Guide," and "Desperate Graves") upon inserting one of the band's four previous studio albums into the disc tray of the user's computer. The promotion also provided a chance to win a pair of tickets to their show at the ICA, London on June 18 and a link to pre-order the digipack, limited edition of the album exclusive to HMV. Also, an interactive website was launched, which featured "Since We've Been Wrong" and "Cotopaxi", as well as their lyrics, and several pictures of Rodriguez-Lopez and Bixler-Zavala.

=== Vinyl release ===
The 2x12" LP was pressed on white vinyl and was limited to 5,000 copies for the United States on Rodriguez Lopez Productions. The first 500 orders of the vinyl album included a limited vinyl slipmat.

== Reception ==
Professional ratings
Aggregate scores
Source	Rating
Metacritic	66/100
Review scores
Source	Rating
AllMusic	4/5 stars
Drowned in Sound	7/10
Entertainment Weekly	B−
Paste	8/10 (Dovey); 5/10 (DuBrowa)
Pitchfork	6.0/10
PopMatters	6/10
Rolling Stone	3/5 stars
Slant Magazine	3/5 stars
Spin	7/10
Sputnikmusic	4/5 stars

The album has a score of 66 out of 100 from Metacritic, indicating "generally favorable reviews". The New York Times gave the album a favorable review and said, "The panache of the singing and the radiant complexity of the music—an achievement shared by Mr. Rodriguez Lopez and a handful of regular collaborators, including the Red Hot Chili Peppers guitarist John Frusciante—drive the album relentlessly forward. And it's the subtle touches, no less than the sweeping ones, that leave an impression." The Boston Globe also gave it a favorable review and said, "Guitarist Omar Rodriguez-Lopez and singer Cedric Bixler-Zavala are the creative duo driving the band and once again deliver on a standing promise to blow any mind that is willing to stay open." Planet Sound gave it a score of seven out of ten and called it the band's "most chilled-out and approachable record." NME also gave it a score of seven out of ten and said it "might be their 'reflective' effort, but it's classic MV." Under the Radar gave it seven stars out of ten and said, "We already knew The Mars Volta could shred. Now we know they can slow the pace too and be equally as compelling." Tiny Mix Tapes gave it three-and-a-half stars out of five and said it "isn't a representation of the best The Mars Volta are capable of, but it is a glimpse into the power they possess when they better harness their capabilities." musicOMH also gave it a score of three-and-a-half stars out of five and said that for the first time the band "really can do restraint, without compromising the overall impact of the instances where things are let rip." Paste gave the album altogether a review averaging about six-and-a-half out of ten: Rachel Dovey gave it an eight out of ten and said that "the group returns to dark balladry on 'Desperate Graves' and 'Copernicus,' two more highlights from a haunting album full of twilight poetry"; Corey DuBrowa, however, gave it five out of ten and called the album "the sound of a band treading water."

Other scores are average, mixed or negative: The Scotsman gave it a score of three stars out of five and said that it "employs stillness as a set-up for all manner of disruption: sharply pealing riffs, phantasmagorical metaphors, convoluted song structures. In many ways it's a typical effort from the guitarist Omar Rodriguez-Lopez and the vocalist Cedric Bixler-Zavala, who make up the Mars Volta's core. But that's not to discredit the more measured side of Octahedron. Presented as an eight-song suite, the album delivers a panoramic range of intensity, sliding along that range in ways both gradual and startling." BBC Music gave it an average review and said that the album "shows the band maintaining a frighteningly productive work rate... while continuing to mature. [...] Its vaulting ambition demands over-inflated self-confidence. And MV have that in spades." Uncut also gave it a score of three stars out of five and said, "As ever with The Mars Volta, there are enough flashes of brilliance to make up for the wearying material elsewhere." Q likewise gave the album three stars out of five and said it "bucks the band's trend for obfuscation, though; conventional song structures are very much in evidence, while its relatively trim 49-minute running time is on par with some of Mars Volta's more involved live jams." Alternative Press likewise gave it three stars and said the album "will appeal to elderly prog fans immune to attention deficit disorder, who have the patience to let its charm gradually unfold."

The A.V. Club gave the album a C and called the Mars Volta "a band that excels when its sing-alongs double as freak-outs; on Octahedron, they've largely ditched the chaos in lieu of an admirable, albeit unsatisfying, experiment in being quiet." The Austin Chronicle gave it one-and-a-half stars out of five and said, "'Cotopaxi' and 'Desperate Graves' are the Volta's most straightforward carbon-burners since Frances the Mute's 'Cygnus ... Vismund Cygnus' yet lack structure and memorable hooks, while the introductory ballad 'Since We've Been Wrong' soars closer to the Eagles than Led Zeppelin."

== Track listing ==
All lyrics written by Cedric Bixler-Zavala, all music composed by Omar Rodríguez-López.

No.	Title	Length
1.	"Since We've Been Wrong"	7:22
2.	"Teflon"	5:06
3.	"Halo of Nembutals"	5:32
4.	"With Twilight as My Guide"	7:54
5.	"Cotopaxi"	3:40
6.	"Desperate Graves"	4:58
7.	"Copernicus"	7:24
8.	"Luciforms"	8:22
Total length:		50:03

- On some streaming platforms, the ambient intro to "Since We've Been Wrong" is indexed as a separate track "Credits" (1:36).

iTunes pre-order bonus track
No.	Title	Length
9.	"Cotopaxi" (live)	3:26

=== Notes ===
- Teflon is a brand name for PTFE (polytetrafluoroethylene), which is used in non-stick pans and bulletproof vests, and is a nickname given to persons, particularly in politics, to whom criticism does not seem to stick.
- Nembutal is a trade name for pentobarbital, which is a long-acting barbiturate used as a sedative. The drug is commonly used in suicides; and is also used in executions in the United States and The People's Republic of China.
- Cotopaxi is a volcano in the Andes Mountains within Ecuador. The volcano is known for its high peak; its last major eruption was in 1877, and a minor one occurred in 1904.
- Nicolaus Copernicus was a Polish astronomer who re-introduced the heliocentric model in the 16th century, which displaced the Earth from the center of the universe.
- Luciform is a term that means relating to, or having properties of light.

== Personnel ==
=== The Mars Volta ===
- Omar Rodríguez-López – guitar, synthesizers, direction, arrangements
- Cedric Bixler-Zavala – vocals, lyrics
- John Frusciante – guitar, drum programming (7)
- Juan Alderete – bass guitar
- Thomas Pridgen – drums
- Marcel Rodríguez-López – keyboards, synthesizers, mellotron, percussion
- Isaiah "Ikey" Owens (though credited, did not play on the album)

=== Additional musicians ===
- Mark Aanderud – additional piano
- Jeremy Ward – intro recording (3, not credited)

=== Recording personnel ===
- Omar Rodríguez-López – producer, recording engineer
- Isaiah Abolin – recording engineer
- Lars Stalfors – recording engineer
- Shaun Sullivan – recording engineer
- Rich Costey – mixing
- Noah Goldstein – mixing assistant
- Lee Foster – mixing assistant
- Howie Weinberg – mastering
- Chris von Rautenkranz – mastering (vinyl)
- Florian Siller – mastering (vinyl)

=== Artwork ===
- Jeff Jordan – original artwork
- Sonny Kay – layout and design

== Charts ==
Chart (2009)	Peak position
Australian Albums (ARIA)	41
Belgian Albums (Ultratop Flanders)	78
Finnish Albums (Suomen virallinen lista)	27
French Albums (SNEP)	123
Japanese Albums (Oricon)	36
Mexican Albums (Top 100 Mexico)	69
New Zealand Albums (RMNZ)	33
Norwegian Albums (VG-lista)	20
Swedish Albums (Sverigetopplistan)	51
Swiss Albums (Schweizer Hitparade)	54
UK Albums (Official Charts)	64
US Billboard 200	12
