= Telesterion (album) =

Compilation album by Omar Rodríguez-López
- Released: April 16, 2011
- Recorded: 2001–2010
- Label: Rodriguez Lopez Productions
- Producer: Omar Rodríguez-López

Omar Rodríguez-López solo chronology
Un Escorpión Perfumado (2010)	Telesterion (2011)	Un Corazón de Nadie (2012)

Omar Rodríguez-López chronology
Octahedron (2009)	Telesterion (2011)	Sin Sin Sin (2011)

Telesterion is the first compilation album by Omar Rodríguez-López as a solo artist. It is a 2 CD, 4 LP release, featuring tracks throughout all of Omar's records and serves as an introduction to Omar's vast collection of solo releases: "Everything I do is a celebration. The idea of this album is a place where people can get a general understanding of that ritual". The European release was originally scheduled for a December 28, 2010 release before Omar decided to record new songs for possible inclusion. A number of first pressing CD copies were sold on the Omar Rodriguez-Lopez Group shows in March, while the vinyl version was made available in a limited amount of 350 pieces to indie stores on Record Store Day 2011, April 16, with the official release of both CD and LP versions being the following Tuesday, the 19th. Both CD and LP versions include 20-page booklet with never-before-seen photos and liner notes by Omar's longtime friend and collaborator Sonny Kay. Rodríguez-López has stated he had little involvement in the compiling of the album.

== Reception ==
Professional ratings
Review scores
Source	Rating
Pitchfork	6/10 stars
Sputnikmusic	4/5 stars

The album received a score of 6 out of 10 from Pitchfork, who noted the jagged assortment of songs included in the compilation. While the site compliments the musicianship of the songs, they also highlight the experimental nature and eclectic genres of the album which might be difficult to process for the listener. Beat magazine also questions the disjointed, myriad of tracks, exclaiming how the songs were created specific to "particular sonic voyages."

Sputnikmusic was more favorable to the album, giving it a rating of 4 out of 5. Sputnik also notes the vast musical genres Rodriguez-Lopez delves into and that Telesterion is the album that would assuredly expose the listener to his "deranged musical world."

== Track listing ==
Side 1A
No.	Title	Original Album	Length
1.	"Locomocion Capillar"	Solar Gambling	3:25
2.	"Population Council’s Wet Dream"	Old Money	6:19
3.	"Amanita Virosa"	Xenophanes	3:17
4.	"Coma Pony"	The Apocalypse Inside of an Orange	6:41

Side 1B
No.	Title	Original Album	Length
5.	"El Monte T’ai"	Calibration	2:35
6.	"Sex, Consolation for Misery"	Absence Makes the Heart Grow Fungus	4:26
7.	"Deus Ex Machina"	A Manual Dexterity: Soundtrack Volume One	5:05
8.	"Rapid Fire Tollbooth"	Se Dice Bisonte, No Bùfalo	5:04
9.	"Un Buitre Amable Me Pico"	Solar Gambling	3:10

Side 2A
No.	Title	Original Album	Length
10.	"Half Kleptos"	Cryptomnesia	3:11
11.	"No Hay Mas Respuestas"	Cizaña de los Amores	4:06
12.	"Solenoid Mosque"	Minor Cuts and Scrapes in the Bushes Ahead	0:35
13.	"Melting Chariots"	The Apocalypse Inside Of An Orange	3:55
14.	"Dead Hisses to Match Our Own"	Megaritual	4:57
15.	"How to Bill the Bilderberg Group"	Old Money	3:29

Side 2B
No.	Title	Original Album	Length
16.	"Polaridad"	Tychozorente	4:53
17.	"La Tirania De La Tradicion"	Se Dice Bisonte, No Bufalo	5:07
18.	"An Ancient Shrewdness in the Veins"	Absence Makes the Heart Grow Fungus	4:11
19.	"Noir"	Cryptomnesia	3:45
20.	"Calibration" (Start of disc 2 on CD)	Calibration	3:37

Side 3A
No.	Title	Original Album	Length
21.	"Viernes"	Ciencia de los Inútiles	4:08
22.	"Spookrijden Op Het Fietspad"	Omar Rodriguez	5:02
23.	"Boiling Death Request a Body to Rest Its Head On"	Se Dice Bisonte, No Bùfalo	4:15
24.	"Victimas Del Cielo"	Cizaña de los Amores	7:41

Side 3B
No.	Title	Original Album	Length
25.	"Las Flores Con Limon"	Solar Gambling	5:41
26.	"At the Push of a Button"	Megaritual	3:22
27.	"Asco Que Conmueve Los Puntos Erogenos"	Xenophanes	4:07
28.	"The Power of Myth"	Old Money	5:30

Side 4A
No.	Title	Original Album	Length
29.	"El Todo"	Tychozorente	4:40
30.	"The Palpitations Form a Limit"	A Manual Dexterity: Soundtrack Volume One	3:23
31.	"Agua Dulce De Pulpo"	Un Escorpión Perfumado	5:43
32.	"Poincaré"	Solar Gambling	2:25
33.	"Shake is for 8th Graders"	Cryptomnesia	2:14
34.	"Atrotecism Fenleon"	Minor Cuts and Scrapes in the Bushes Ahead	1:05

Side 4B
No.	Title	Original Album	Length
35.	"Cásate Colmillo"	The Somnambulists	6:29
36.	"Los Tres "Yo's"" (This track exclusive to the vinyl)	Mantra Hiroshima	3:03
37.	"Desarraigo"	Xenophanes	5:55
38.	"Lunes"	Ciencia de los Inútiles	4:27

== Release history ==
Region	Date	Label	Format
Worldwide	April 16, 2011	Rodriguez Lopez Productions	Digital download
Worldwide	April 10, 2011	Rodriguez Lopez Productions	CD
Worldwide	April 19, 2011	Rodriguez Lopez Productions	LP
