= Infinity Drips =

Studio album by Omar Rodríguez-López
- Released: October 21, 2016
- Recorded: 2008–2011
- Length: 34:11
- Label: Ipecac
- Producer: Omar Rodríguez-López

Omar Rodríguez-López solo chronology
| Cell Phone Bikini (2016) | Infinity Drips (2016) | Weekly Mansions (2016) |

Omar Rodríguez-López chronology
| Antemasque (2014) | Infinity Drips (2016) | Crystal Fairy (2017) |

Infinity Drips is the thirty-fourth studio album by Omar Rodríguez-López as a solo artist, released on 21 October 2016. It is his eighth release in the 12 album series initiated by Ipecac Recordings.

"Zuben El Genubi" was uploaded in advance as the album's single.

== Background ==
Infinity Drips shares its name with a piece of artwork created by Omar's longtime artistic collaborator Sonny Kay. It appeared in the booklet for the compilation album Telesterion, so it was assumed that the piece would become cover art for a future release by Rodriguez-Lopez. The album however features a different artwork made by Elyn Kazarian, while Kay's artwork went on to be used for Anywhere's album Anywhere II in 2018.

The album has Middle Eastern aesthetic and diverse instrumentation. It was described as a result of Rodríguez-López's trip to Jerusalem, "reflecting Arab influences in Latin culture". Teri Gender Bender talked about the album in an interview with The Seventh Hex regarding Bosnian Rainbows in 2015: "My mother loves Indian music, so when I was little I had the fortune of being in an environment of spices and Middle Eastern music. Omar and I worked on an album where it’s just Indian [sic] music, samples turned into neatly crafted hymns with some Spanish lyrics, some others are English lyrics… At the end of the day it’s always great to try new things for one self. Who knows, maybe someday we’ll release it."

Some of the musical fragments also appear in various other recordings by Rodriguez-Lopez. "Azha" appears in "Happiness" from Unicorn Skeleton Mask and the first three tracks off Zapopan, "Edasich" in "Suenos Salvajes" from Equinox, and "Healed and Raised by Wounds" off Nom de Guerre Cabal, and "Manir al Shuja" in "Ocho" from Un Corazon de Nadie. All track titles are Arabic names for stars.

== Track listing ==
All music written by Omar Rodríguez-López, all lyrics and vocal melodies written by Teri Gender Bender

| No. | Title | Length |
|---|---|---|
| 1. | "Na'ir Al Saif" | 1:05 |
| 2. | "Azha" | 1:43 |
| 3. | "Jabhat Al Akrab" | 1:26 |
| 4. | "Microscopium" | 1:16 |
| 5. | "Tania Borealis" | 2:24 |
| 6. | "Lacerta" | 4:51 |
| 7. | "Zuben El Genubi" | 3:08 |
| 8. | "El Nath" | 1:51 |
| 9. | "Nihal" | 4:50 |
| 10. | "Baten Kaitos" | 1:48 |
| 11. | "Edasich" | 3:38 |
| 12. | "Er Rai" | 1:48 |
| 13. | "Manir Al Shuja" | 4:23 |
| Total length: | | 34:11 |

== Personnel ==
- Teri Gender Bender – vocals
- Omar Rodríguez-López – 12-string fretless guitar, acoustic guitar, tabla programming, sequences, recording engineer
- Shimmly – lute
- Aaron Cruz – bass, bowed bass

=== Production ===
- Jon Debaun – recording, mixing
- Shawn Sullivan – recording
- Chris Common – mastering
- Elyn Kazarian – artwork

== Release history ==
| Region | Date | Label | Format |
|---|---|---|---|
| Various | October 21, 2016 | Ipecac | Digital download |
| United Kingdom | December 2023 | Clouds Hill | LP |
