= Arañas en la Sombra =

Studio album by Omar Rodríguez-López
- Released: August 26, 2016
- Recorded: 2001–2012
- Genres: Experimental rock, progressive rock, psychedelic rock
- Length: 38:30
- Label: Ipecac Recordings
- Producer: Omar Rodríguez-López

Omar Rodríguez-López solo chronology
Blind Worms Pious Swine (2016)	Arañas en la Sombra (2016)	Umbrella Mistress (2016)

Omar Rodríguez-López chronology
Antemasque (2014)	Arañas en la Sombra (2016)	Crystal Fairy (2017)

Arañas en la Sombra (transl. Spiders in the Shadow) is the thirtieth studio album by Omar Rodríguez-López as a solo artist, released on 26 August 2016. It is his fourth release in the 12-album series initiated by Ipecac Recordings.

The record features tracks that originated during the early years of The Mars Volta, with contributions from original band members Ikey Owens, Eva Gardner and Jon Theodore, as well as a guest appearance of honorary member John Frusciante.

"Arcos del Amor" was uploaded in advance as the album's single and went on to be re-recorded by Omar in 2018 and released on July 24, 2020, as part of The Clouds Hill Tapes Parts I, II & III.

== Background ==
The album contains contributions from previous The Mars Volta members and was subsequently recorded many years apart. It was possibly finished in 2012, four years prior to its release. Some of the songs, or parts of them at least, have their origins in previous works by Rodríguez-López and performing bandmates.

The second track of the album, "Arcos del Amor," is based on the drum track taken from "La Tiranía de la Tradición," a song from Rodríguez-López's 2007 album Se Dice Bisonte, No Búfalo.

Tracks 3–9 appeared as instrumental pieces on The Ramrod Tapes, the leaked music files which surfaced in August 2013. Between listeners and The Mars Volta lead singer Cedric Bixler-Zavala himself, the collection of unfinished songs were dubbed "The Ramrod Tapes" or "Revenants," which covered different eras of Rodriguez-Lopez's output and a myriad of The Mars Volta songs in various stages of development such as an early "Vicarious Atonement" demo from 2006's Amputechture and the original basic tracks for "Molochwalker" with Thomas Pridgen in 2008 which finally appeared on 2012's Noctourniquet.

"Primitivo y Bárbaro"/"Semillas de Hez" features a percussion breakdown which first appeared on an original unreleased recording of The Mars Volta's "Roulette Dares (The Haunt Of)" in 2001.

"Extravagants Dientes" is an alternate recording of "Cásate Colmillo" which first appeared on the 2011 compilation album Telesterion. At the time, the song was credited as being taken from an unreleased album titled The Somnambulists, or Somnambulos. Being referenced by Rodríguez-López in various interviews and on the aforementioned four-LP compilation album, Telesterion, The Somnambulists is theorized to be an unreleased or discarded Mars Volta record, which in turn found its way officially released on Arañas en la Sombra. A third, instrumental version of "Extravagants Dientes" was among the tracks included in The Ramrod Tapes. All three recordings have quite noticeable differences, although they use the same basic drum track. Parts of this song were sometimes played live by The Mars Volta during the improvised sections of "Take the Veil Cerpin Taxt."

== Reception ==
Mxdwn Music gave a positive review of the album, complimenting individual tracks. The site described the first two songs as energetic and a strange sensation. "El Vacío" is praised for its language, arpeggios, distortion, and percussion. "Un Mar Amargo" is especially lauded for its vocal line and arpeggiating theme. However, "Semillas De Hez" is criticized for its effects and electronic aspects, which they believe is incongruous to the rest of the tracks. The Music gave the album four stars, noting its electrifying energy and the creativity of Rodriguez-Lopez. Verbicide complimented the jam by Rodriguez-Lopez and Ikey Owens in "El Vacío." Lastly, The Quietus characterizes the record as having a unique sonic palette and "intricately constructed prog-rock pieces." They further commended Rodriguez-Lopez's ability to interweave the disparate tracks into a cohesive body of work.

== Track listing ==
No.	Title	Length
1.	"No Hay Inteligencia"	0:28
2.	"Arcos del Amor"	2:28
3.	"El Vacío"	4:32
4.	"Piojos Histéricos"	1:28
5.	"Un Mar Amargo"	3:55
6.	"Metamorfosis"	2:56
7.	"Extravagants Dientes"	5:32
8.	"Primitivo y Bárbaro"	4:25
9.	"Semillas de Hez"	2:15
10.	"Araña en la Sombra"	5:01
11.	"Voluntad de los Ciegos"	5:00
12.	"Presencia"	0:30
Total length:		38:30

Tracks 3 & 4, 5 & 6, and 8 & 9 form single pieces.

== Personnel ==
- Omar Rodríguez-López – vocals, guitars, bass (2, 7, 10, 11), synths, percussion
- Marcel Rodríguez-López – keyboards, drums, percussion
- Jon Theodore – drums
- Eva Gardner – bass (3–4)
- Isaiah "Ikey" Owens – keyboards (3–6, 8–9)
- Juan Alderete de la Peña – bass (5–6, 8–9)
- John Frusciante – additional guitar (8–9)
- Blake Fleming – additional drums (8–9)
- Teri Gender Bender – backing vocals (11)

=== Production ===
- Omar Rodríguez-López – producer, recording
- Robert Carranza – recording
- Alex Newport – recording
- Chris Common – mastering
- Jon Debaun – recording & mixing
- Flo Siller – mastering (vinyl)
- Chris von Rautenkranz – mastering (vinyl)
- Julio Venegas – cover art
- Adán Guevara – layout

== Release history ==
Region	Date	Label	Format
Worldwide	August 26, 2016	Ipecac Recordings	Digital download
Worldwide	January 19, 2024	Clouds Hill	Vinyl LP
