= Some Need It Lonely =

Studio album by Omar Rodríguez-López
- Released: December 16, 2016
- Recorded: 1999–2012
- Genres: Experimental rock, avant-garde, dub
- Length: 37:13
- Label: Ipecac
- Producer: Omar Rodríguez-López

Omar Rodríguez-López solo chronology
Nom de Guerre Cabal (2016)	Some Need It Lonely (2016)	A Lovejoy (2016)

Omar Rodríguez-López chronology
Antemasque (2014)	Some Need It Lonely (2016)	Crystal Fairy (2017)

Professional ratings
Review scores
Source	Rating
Exclaim!	4/10

Some Need It Lonely is the thirty-eighth studio album by Omar Rodríguez-López as a solo artist, released on 16 December 2016. It is his twelfth and last release in the 12-album series initiated by Ipecac Recordings, although before its release the label confirmed an additional 12 records forthcoming set to continue the fortnightly release schedule.

"Archangel Trophy" was uploaded in advance as the album's single.

== Track listing ==
All songs written by Omar Rodríguez-López.

No.	Title	Length
1.	"Bitter Sunsets"	3:38
2.	"We Might"	1:46
3.	"Sanity a Dream"	3:43
4.	"Zophiel"	3:48
5.	"Archangel Trophy"	3:52
6.	"Changes"	2:53
7.	"Back to the Same"	3:04
8.	"Zero Worth"	3:07
9.	"Barachiel Is At It Again"	2:31
10.	"Ariel"	4:09
11.	"Mulu Lizi"	4:42
Total length:		37:13

Tracks 5 & 6 form a single track, as do 8 & 9. Track 4 contains a guitar sample of The Mars Volta's "Vicarious Atonement".

== Personnel ==
- Omar Rodríguez-López – guitars, synthesizers, bass (1, 5–7, 10), vocals (1)
- Teri Gender Bender – vocals (2, 5–9, 11)
- Cedric Bixler-Zavala – voice (3)
- Jon Theodore – drums (1, 4)
- Thomas Pridgen – drums (3, 7–9)
- Deantoni Parks – drums (5–6)
- Juan Alderete de la Peña – bass (3, 7–9)
- Marcel Rodriguez-Lopez – percussion, keyboards, synthesizers
- Adrián Terrazas-González – saxophone, percussion

=== Production ===
- Jon Debaun – engineering
- Shawn Sullivan – engineering
- Lars Stalfors – mixing
- Chris Common – mastering
- Mackie – cover art, layout

== Release history ==
Region	Date	Label	Format
Various	December 16, 2016	Ipecac	Digital download
United Kingdom	December 2023	Clouds Hill	LP
