= Antemasque =

Antemasque may refer to:

- Antemasque (band), an American rock band formed in 2014
- Antemasque (album), the 2014 debut album by Antemasque
- Antimasque, a 16th- and early 17th-century court entertainment
