= Sepulcros de Miel =

Studio album by Omar Rodríguez-López
- Released: May 30, 2010
- Recorded: 2006–2007
- Genre: Experimental rock, psychedelic rock, electronica
- Length: 29:31
- Label: Sargent House; Rodriguez Lopez Productions
- Producer: Omar Rodríguez-López

Omar Rodríguez-López chronology
Omar Rodriguez-Lopez & John Frusciante (2010)	Sepulcros de Miel (2010)	Tychozorente (2010)

John Frusciante chronology
The Empyrean (2009)	Sepulcros de Miel (2010)	Speed Dealer Moms EP (2010)

Omar Rodríguez-Lopez & John Frusciante chronology
Omar Rodriguez-Lopez & John Frusciante (2010)	Sepulcros de Miel (2010)	Hiding In The Light (2014)

Sepulcros de Miel (English: Tombs of Honey) is the twenty-first release by Omar Rodríguez-López, guitarist, band leader, and producer of The Mars Volta Group. Released under the Omar Rodriguez Lopez Quartet name, this record features fellow Mars Volta members Juan Alderete & Marcel Rodriguez-Lopez as well as John Frusciante. The record was digitally released May 30, 2010, with a vinyl release to follow, scheduled to ship around August 15. Vinyl copies were finished early and supplied on July 15, 1,000 copies on purple vinyl and 1,000 copies on orange vinyl. Like Omar Rodriguez-Lopez & John Frusciante, this album was originally made available as a free download from Omar's Bandcamp page with the option to donate money to "Keep Music In Schools" program. Later, free purchase option was replaced by a minimum price of $4.99. Similar to the Omar Rodriguez-Lopez & Lydia Lunch, this album consists of a single lengthy piece divided into several parts.

== Track listing ==
No.	Title	Length
1.	"Part I"	2:22
2.	"Part II"	5:08
3.	"Part III"	5:06
4.	"Part IV"	2:24
5.	"Part V"	3:33
6.	"Part VI"	3:27
7.	"Part VII"	3:10
8.	"Part VIII"	4:22
Total length:		29:31

== Personnel ==
- Omar Rodríguez-López – synthesizers, guitar, sound manipulation
- John Frusciante – guitar
- Juan Alderete – bass
- Marcel Rodriguez-Lopez – drums, percussion, keyboards, electronics (intro & outro)
- Adrián Terrazas-González – saxophone (uncredited but occasionally can be heard in the background)

== Release history ==
Format	Date	Label
Digital	May 30, 2010	Sargent House / Rodriguez Lopez Productions
Vinyl / 1000 purple lp - 1000 orange lp	July 15, 2010	Sargent House / Rodriguez Lopez Productions
black LP	December 2023	Clouds Hill
