= Crystal Fairy (band) =

American rock band

Background information
- Origin: Los Angeles / El Paso, U.S.
- Genres: Alternative rock, stoner rock, sludge metal
- Years active: 2016–2017
- Label: Ipecac
- Spinoff of: Bosnian Rainbows; Le Butcherettes; Melvins
- Past members: Buzz Osborne; Dale Crover; Teri Gender Bender; Omar Rodríguez-López
- Website: Crystal Fairy's Bandcamp

Crystal Fairy was an American rock supergroup from Los Angeles and El Paso, formed in 2016. It consisted of Melvins' Buzz Osborne (guitar) and Dale Crover (drums), alongside Le Butcherettes' Teri Gender Bender (vocals) and Omar Rodríguez-López (bass) of At the Drive-In / The Mars Volta / Antemasque fame.

== History ==
Osborne first saw Le Butcherettes open for his friend Jello Biafra. Excited by the performance, he told Crover that he wanted to tour with the band. Le Butcherettes opened for the Melvins on different occasions. The bands found common ground and their 2015 shows would typically end with Teri Gender Bender joining the Melvins onstage to perform covers of Pop-O-Pies' "Fascists Eat Donuts" and Bikini Kill's "Rebel Girl". The latter song was eventually recorded in studio and released in September 2015 on Joyful Noise Recordings as a "Melvins feat. Teri Gender Bender" 7" single. As a result of their kinship, the Melvins and Gender Bender, along with the addition of Gender Bender's friend and frequent collaborator Omar Rodríguez-López, formed a separate band and recorded an album together.

During one of the recording sessions, Teri Gender Bender improvised the line "My name is Crystal Fairy!", likely as a reference to the 2013 Chilean film Crystal Fairy & the Magical Cactus. The name stuck with the band. Before that, the band was briefly called Red Alpha Royale (this name still appears on the labels of their debut 7" single "Necklace of Divorce").

After performing several shows together, a booked tour was cancelled and the momentum of the band stopped entirely, with the band "falling apart" per Crover. "Buzz and I were really committed to it. We were going to put The Melvins on hold because we thought that it was something that was really special. So that was a tough loss."

== Band members ==
- Teri Gender Bender – lead vocals
- Buzz Osborne – guitar, vocals
- Dale Crover – drums
- Omar Rodríguez-López – bass

== Discography ==
=== Studio albums ===
- Crystal Fairy (February 24, 2017)

=== Singles ===
- Necklace of Divorce / Drugs on the Bus (October 21, 2016)
- Chiseler (December 9, 2016)
- Crystal Fairy (January 23, 2017)
