= Nom de Guerre Cabal =

Studio album by Omar Rodríguez-López
- Released: December 2, 2016
- Recorded: 2009–2012
- Genre: Electronic rock
- Length: 39:07
- Label: Ipecac
- Producer: Omar Rodríguez-López

Omar Rodríguez-López solo chronology
Zapopan (2016)	Nom de Guerre Cabal (2016)	Some Need It Lonely (2016)

Omar Rodríguez-López chronology
Antemasque (2014)	Nom de Guerre Cabal (2016)	Crystal Fairy (2017)

Professional ratings
Review scores
Source	Rating
Exclaim!	7/10

Nom de Guerre Cabal is the thirty-seventh studio album by Omar Rodríguez-López as a solo artist, released on 2 December 2016. It is his eleventh release in the 12 album series initiated by Ipecac Recordings.

Similar to the preceding album Zapopan, Nom de Guerre Cabal features new mixes of previously released songs, this time with all songs having been included on ¿Sólo Extraño?, originally released March 8, 2013.

"Bitter Sunsets" was uploaded in advance as the album's single.

== Track listing ==
All songs written by Omar Rodríguez-López, original titles from ¿Sólo Extraño? in parentheses.

No.	Title	Original title	Length
1.	"Uncovering a Word"	"Salt Lines"	2:04
2.	"Bitter Sunsets"	"Invisible Lasiness"	4:46
3.	"Healed and Raised by Wounds"	"Turn For Caring"	5:12
4.	"Riot Squid"	"Horror (original)", aka "My Horror Is in Park, Drive Me Away Troubled Heart" from Dōitashimashite	3:33
5.	"Life Proves Its Worth"	"House in the Sand"	6:06
6.	"Victims of Power"	"Machu Picchu"	3:21
7.	"Violet Rays Again"	"Quemamos Lo"	6:12
8.	"Nom de Guerre"	"Common Condescend"	4:00
9.	"How Does One Love Go Blind"	"Discursos"	3:53
Total length:			39:07

== Personnel ==
- Omar Rodríguez-López – vocals, synthesizers, sequences, guitar, bass, piano, samples, engineering
- Deantoni Parks – drums (1-7,9)
- Thomas Pridgen – drums (8)

=== Production ===
- Chris Common – mixing, mastering

== Release history ==
Region	Date	Label	Format
Various	December 2, 2016	Ipecac	Digital download
United Kingdom	December 2023	Clouds Hill	LP
