= Weekly Mansions =

Studio album by Omar Rodríguez-López
- Released: November 4, 2016
- Recorded: 2009–2011
- Genres: Electronica, synthpop
- Length: 39:54
- Label: Ipecac
- Producers: Omar Rodríguez-López; Marcel Rodríguez-López; Lars Stalfors

Omar Rodríguez-López solo chronology
Infinity Drips (2016)	Weekly Mansions (2016)	Zapopan (2016)

Omar Rodríguez-López chronology
Antemasque (2014)	Weekly Mansions (2016)	Crystal Fairy (2017)

Professional ratings
Review scores
Source	Rating
Exclaim!	5/10

Weekly Mansions is the thirty-fifth studio album by Omar Rodríguez-López as a solo artist, released on 4 November 2016. It is his ninth release in the 12-album series initiated by Ipecac Recordings.

Co-written between Omar and his brother Marcel, Weekly Mansions is described as "an eclectic exploration of neo-electro-dance"., and is one of the few Rodriguez-Lopez's albums to not feature any guitar whatsoever. It was mostly recorded in Japan in 2011, with the title likely a reference to the Japanese hotel chain.

"Metallic Sweating for the Rich" contains the original track used as the outro to "Piedras y Ansiedad" from 2010's Tychozorente. "Disheartening Envelope" is an extended version of "Células Hermosas", previously released on Octopus Kool Aid, elements of which were present throughout Tychozorente as well. "Want, Need, Scream in a Dream" is an original version of what eventually became the intro to The Mars Volta's song "Zed And Two Naughts" from Noctourniquet.

"Science Urges" was uploaded in advance as the album's single and went on to be re-recorded by Omar in 2018 and released on July 24, 2020, as part of The Clouds Hill Tapes Parts I, II & III.

== Track listing ==
All music written by Omar and Marcel Rodríguez-López. All lyrics and vocal melodies written by Omar Rodríguez-López.

No.	Title	Length
1.	"Essential Punishments"	3:29
2.	"Rotten Straw Lips"	3:45
3.	"Metallic Sweating for the Rich"	1:14
4.	"Science Urges"	4:10
5.	"Want, Need, Scream in a Dream"	0:50
6.	"Sophia as Well"	3:28
7.	"The Editor"	0:56
8.	"A Little Old Picnic in Fort Collins"	4:11
9.	"Disheartening Envelope"	3:26
10.	"Get in There Before You Sour"	2:45
11.	"Head Is Made of Straw"	1:27
12.	"Right on My Finger"	3:55
13.	"They Ain't Kidding Me"	2:02
14.	"Bone Fat"	4:16
Total length:		39:54

== Personnel ==
- Omar Rodríguez-López – vocals, keyboards, programming, production, recording
- Marcel Rodríguez-López – keyboards, programming, percussion, production, recording, mixing
- Lars Stalfors – programming, keyboards, production, recording

=== Technical ===
- Jon Debaun – recording
- Chris Common – mixing, mastering
- Mackie – artwork and layout

== Release history ==
Region	Date	Label	Format
Various	November 4, 2016	Ipecac	Digital download
United Kingdom	December 2023	Clouds Hill	LP
