= Teri Gender Bender =

American rock musician

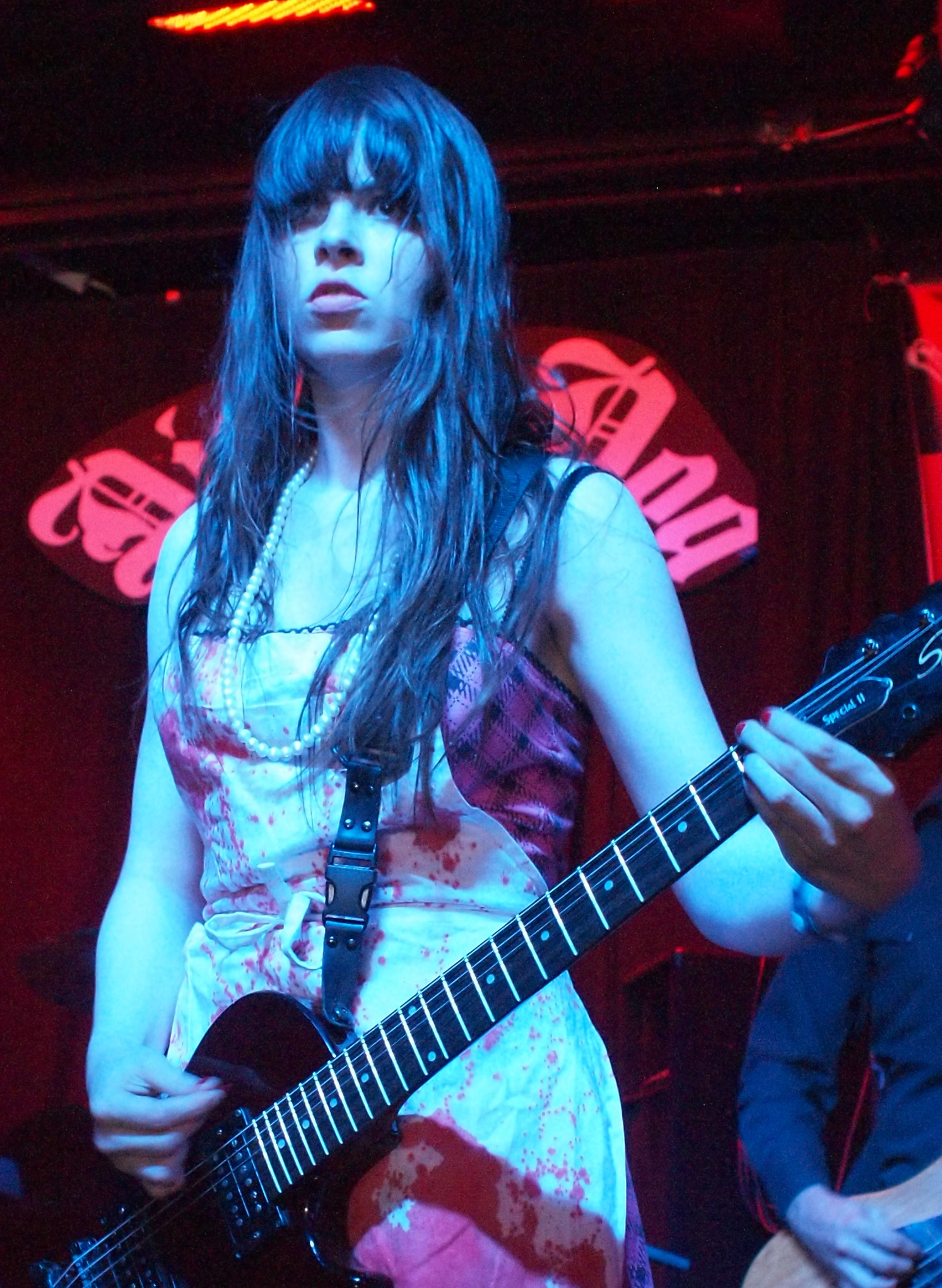
- Teri Gender Bender performing in 2011

Background information
- Born: Teresa Suárez Cosío; Denver, Colorado, U.S.
- Origin: Guadalajara, Jalisco, Mexico
- Genres: Punk rock, garage rock, electronic rock, garage punk
- Occupation: Musician
- Instruments: Vocals, guitar, keyboards
- Years active: 2007–present

Teresa Suárez Cosío (born May 15, 1989), commonly known by her stage name Teri Gender Bender, is an American singer and musician, known primarily as the founding member, lead singer, and guitarist of Guadalajara-based rock band Le Butcherettes since 2007. With Omar Rodríguez-López, she is a member of Bosnian Rainbows (founded in 2012), Crystal Fairy (founded in 2016), Kimono Kult, and in 2025 joined The Mars Volta for their live performances of Lucro Sucio; Los Ojos del Vacio after having fronted a reunited De Facto for a one-off in 2024. Her performance persona and artistry have been compared to Björk, Siouxsie Sioux, Karen O, and the first artistic stage of Gloria Trevi.

== Biography ==
Suárez was born in Denver, Colorado to a Mexican mother and a Spanish father, who worked as a prison steward. At age ten, she began to have recurring dreams of playing guitar, and was able to convince her father to buy her one. She lived in Denver for the first thirteen years of her life, until she moved to Mexico with her mother and two younger brothers after her father's death from a heart attack.

Suárez and drummer Auryn Jolene founded Le Butcherettes at age 17 while still in school in Guadalajara. Jolene was later replaced by Normandi Heuxdaflo. The band incorporated graphic elements such as raw meat and bloody aprons into their stage performances and Suárez adopted the last name Gender Bender as feminist statements of the treatment of women in Mexico. Suárez met Omar Rodríguez-López at one of their local gigs. He was impressed by her performance when after a power outage had interrupted the show, she jumped into the crowd and continued singing into a megaphone. Rodríguez-López signed the band to his label, went on to produce their first album Sin Sin Sin in 2011, and also briefly served as the band's bassist. Suárez contributed lyrics and vocals to Rodríguez-López' Octopus Kool Aid in 2012, and starred in his unreleased film project Mi No Y Esperanza. Le Butcherettes' 2014 album Cry Is for the Flies was written about her experience moving from her family in Mexico to Los Angeles in 2012.

In February 2016, she released a cover of Depeche Mode's "I Feel You", recorded together with Omar Rodríguez-López and With Lions, and made available via the latter's SoundCloud account.

Suárez is a vegetarian. She used to be a vegan but stated that she developed anemia which motivated her dietary change.

== Discography ==
Bosnian Rainbows

- Bosnian Rainbows Live At Clouds Hill LP (2012)
- Bosnian Rainbows LP (2013)

Le Butcherettes

- Kiss & Kill EP (2008)
- Sin Sin Sin LP (2011)
- iTunes Live: SXSW EP (2011)
- Cry Is for the Flies LP (2014)
- A Raw Youth LP (2015)
- Chaos As Usual (With Melvins) [vinyl split] Single (2015)
- Sólo Soy Pueblo (Llanto) Single (2015)
- Shave the Pride Single (2015)
- House Hunter Single (2016)
- My Mother Holds My Only Life Line Single (2016)
- bi/MENTAL LP (2019)
- Ever Fallen In Love (With Someone You Shouldn't've) Single (2019)
- Don't Bleed EP (2020)

Omar Rodríguez-López

- Octopus Kool Aid LP (2012)
- Hiding In The Light EP (2014) as Kimono Kult
- Corazones LP (2016)
- Blind Worms Pious Swine LP (2016)
- Arañas en la Sombra LP (2016)
- Umbrella Mistress LP (2016)
- El Bien y Mal Nos Une LP (2016)
- Cell Phone Bikini LP (2016)
- Infinity Drips LP (2016)
- Weekly Mansions LP (2016)
- Zapopan LP (2016)
- Some Need It Lonely LP (2016)
- A Lovejoy (2016)
- Zen Thrills (2017)
- Chocolate Tumor Hormone Parade (2017)
- Azul, Mis Dientes (2017)
- Doom Patrol (2017)

Crystal Fairy

- Necklace of Divorce / Drugs on the Bus Single (2016)
- Crystal Fairy LP (2017)

Solo

- Insect Legs (from Unspeakable Volume One compilation) (2014)
- Rebel Girl (Melvins feat. Teri Gender Bender) Single (2015)
- I Feel You (with With Lions and Omar Rodríguez-López) (2016)
- Cuando Yo Era Una Niña EP (2022)
- Olivia, She Wanted Me To Leave Her Alone EP (2022)
- Madre Would Not Allow It Though EP (2022)
- Pestering Became A Virtue EP (2022)
- Leaving Her To Be Was Just Not An Option EP (2022)
- Erik, Even He Found It To Be Obscene EP (2022)
- X Rays Were Taken To Make Sure I Am There, That I Exist EP (2022)
- I Suddenly Remembered That I Am Not (It Feels Too) EP (2022)
- Funny EP (2022)
- You Were Truly The One That Made Us Laugh EP (2022)
- Saturn Sex EP (2022)
- State Of Fear EP (2022)
- Catspeak EP (2023)
- Outsiders EP (2023)
- TGB (2025)

The Mars Volta

- Lucro Sucio; Unfinished Business (2026)
