= Dave Elitch =

American drummer (born 1984)

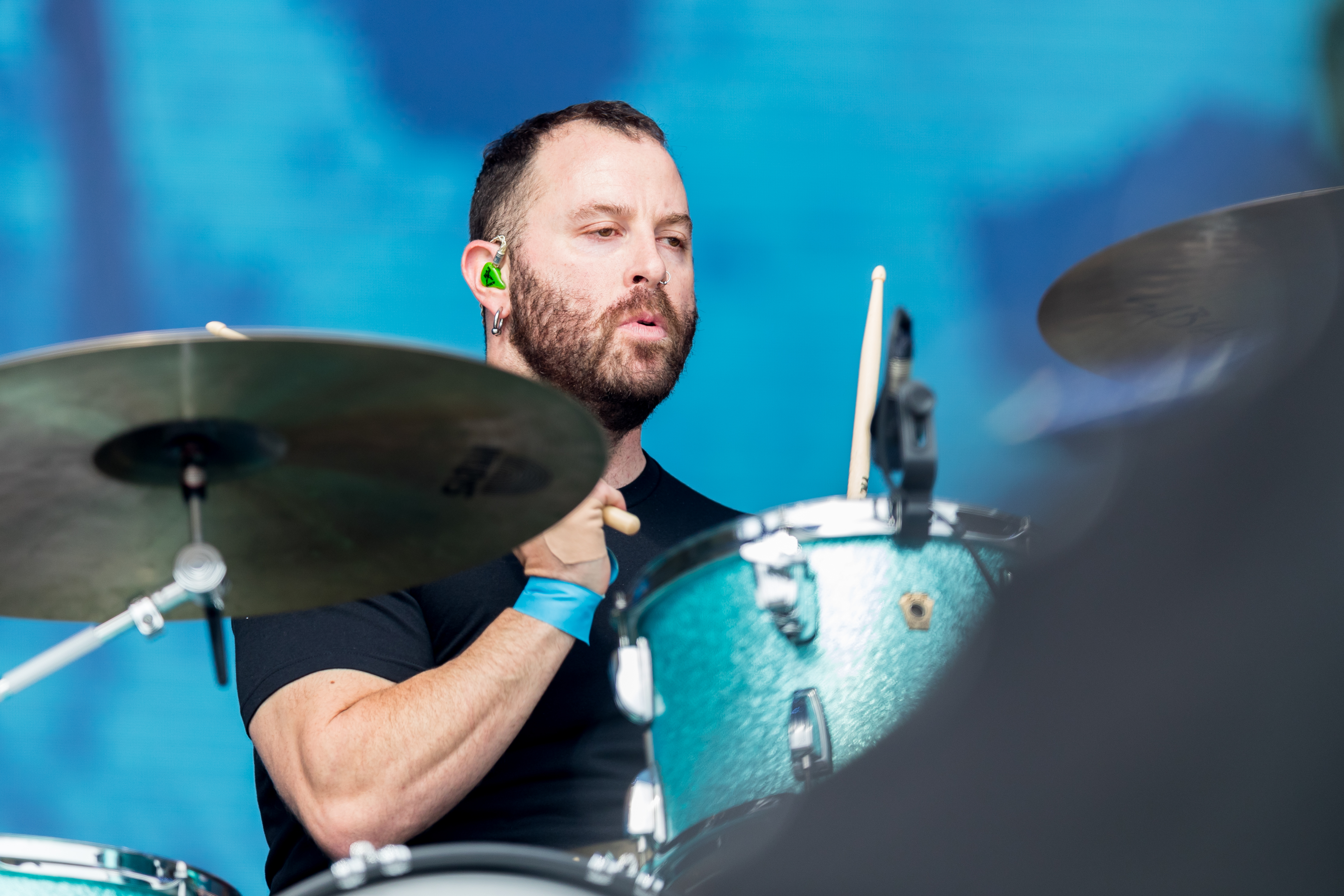
- Elitch performing with Weezer in 2022

Background information
- Born: David Elitch; April 7, 1984 (age 41); Sebastopol, California, U.S.
- Genres: Progressive rock; alternative rock; experimental rock; alternative metal
- Occupation: Drummer
- Member of: Daughters of Mara
- Formerly of: The Mars Volta, Killer Be Killed, Antemasque
- Website: daveelitch.com

David Elitch (born April 7, 1984) is an American drummer, session musician, and drum instructor. He is best known for his work with the progressive rock band The Mars Volta and for teaching body mechanics and the psychology of performance to other drummers.

== Biography ==
Elitch grew up in Sebastopol, California. Because of his father being an avid jazz fan, Elitch predominately listened to jazz and big band music and soon learned to play the genre at an early age. He would later learn to play along to heavy metal and progressive bands.

Elitch first garnered attention when he moved to Los Angeles and joined the hard rock band Daughters of Mara. In 2007, Daughters of Mara recorded their debut album "I Am Destroyer" with GGGarth Richardson on Virgin/Capitol Records. He also gained notice through his contributions in the highly acclaimed gospel chops drum DVD, "Shed Sessionz Vol. 2," where he is paired with top gospel and R&B drummers.

In October 2009, Elitch made his live debut with The Mars Volta in Oslo, replacing Thomas Pridgen as the band's drummer. He completed the second leg of the Octahedron tour, performing in Europe, Australia and South America. He appeared at Big Day Out and SWU Music & Arts Festival in 2010, both performances of which have become popular on YouTube. He departed the band the same year in October and was replaced by Deantoni Parks.

In 2012, Elitch was hired by heavy metal group Killer Be Killed and recorded drums and percussion on their 2014 inaugural, eponymous album. He left the group in 2015 and was replaced by Ben Koller.

Elitch joined the rock supergroup Antemasque in 2014, created by former The Mars Volta bandmates Omar Rodriguez-Lopez and Cedric Bixler-Zavala. The group was comprised also of Red Hot Chili Peppers bassist Flea and Rodriguez-Lopez's younger brother Marfred Rodriguez-Lopez. Elitch contributed to their 2014 self-titled album and left the following year.

While Elitch was simultaneously working on both Killer Be Killed and Antemasque records, he was also preparing for Miley Cyrus' upcoming tour for her album Bangerz in 2014. He was allotted three weeks to prepare for the tour of which he participated for a few months. He had previously performed with Cyrus during her Wrecking Ball television performances on The Tonight Show With Jimmy Fallon and The Ellen DeGeneres Show during the previous year.

In 2022, Elitch filled in for Patrick Wilson of Weezer during the band's Chicago show that year and the entirety of the European tour.

Elitch conducts online masterclass lectures and operates a private teaching practice in Los Angeles where he incorporates methods of longevity and body mechanics. He tutors novices as well as experienced professionals. These techniques have earned him a reputation as a highly sought-after drum instructor among skilled practitioners. One notable student is comedian Bill Burr.

He has also worked with M83, Justin Timberlake, The 1975, Susanne Sundfør, Big Sir, Juliette Lewis, Crash Kings, Big Black Delta, September Mourning, Kill Corps, Brenda Radney, and Vicky Cryer. In addition to working with individual artists, Elitch has offered his services on film scores for major motion pictures such as Trolls, Logan, and The Book of Love.

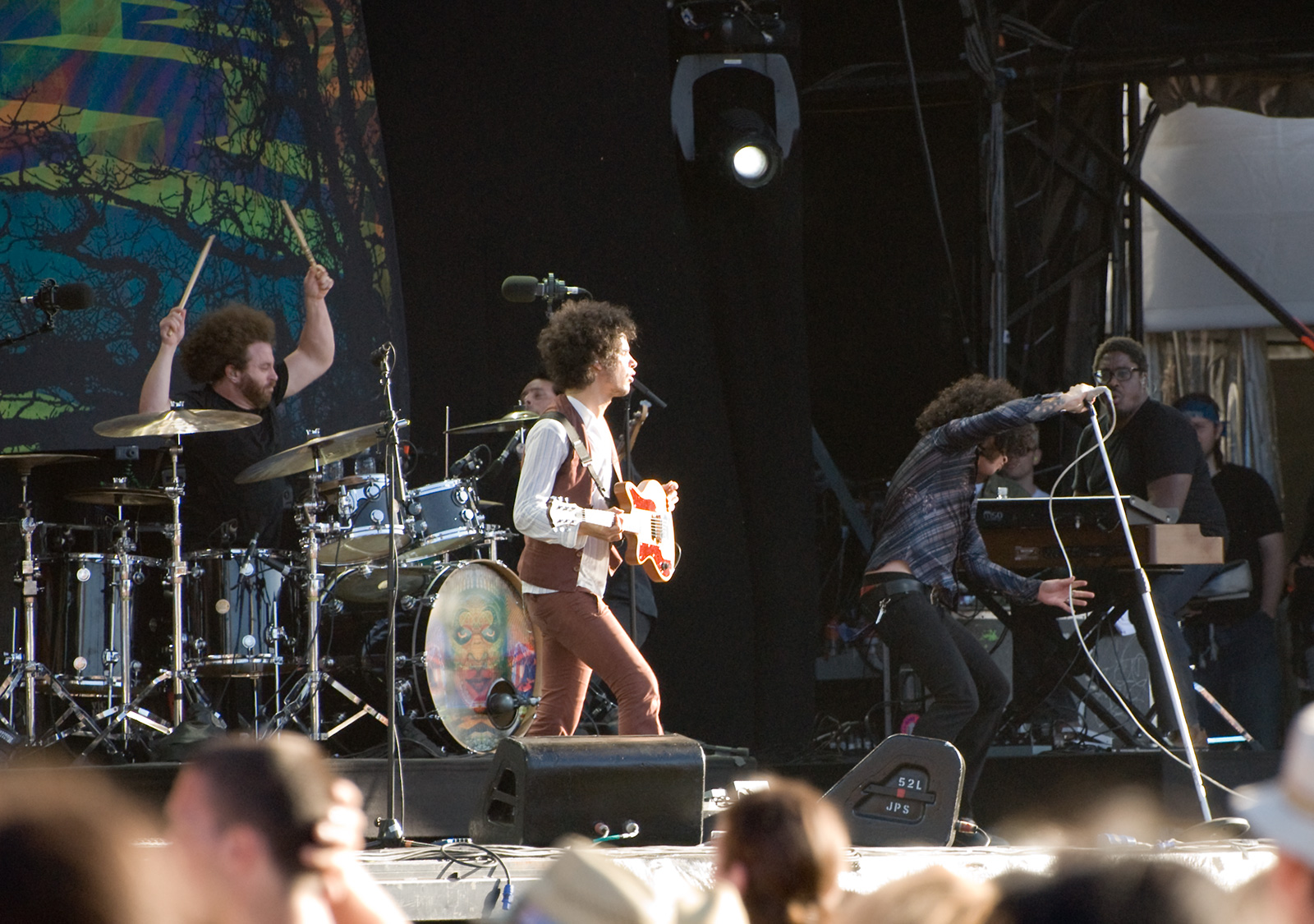
Elitch at Big Day Out in 2010 with The Mars Volta

== Discography ==
=== With Antemasque ===
- Antemasque (2014)

=== With Big Sir ===
- Digital Gardens (2014)

=== With Carl King ===
- Grand Architects Of The Universe (2017)

=== With Daughters of Mara ===
- I Am Destroyer (2008)

=== With Dearly Beloved ===
- Enduro (2014)

=== With Devils Gift ===
- Devils Gift (2008)

=== With Frankie Jazz ===
- Serotonin (2012)

=== With Killer Be Killed ===
- Killer Be Killed (2014)

=== With Kirin J Callinan ===
- Return To Center (2019)

=== With Never Shout Never ===
- Black Cat (2015)

=== With The Night Game ===
- The Night Game (2018)

=== With Omar Rodríguez-López ===
- Gorilla Preacher Cartel (2017)

=== With Vicky Cryer ===
- The Synthetic Love Of Emotional Engineering (2011)
