= Lingua Franca (album) =

EP by T.R.A.M.
- Released: 2012
- Studio: Farias Productions, Los Angeles, California
- Genre: Jazz fusion
- Length: 29:49
- Label: Sumerian; SUM-071

Lingua Franca is an EP by the supergroup T.R.A.M., featuring multi-instrumentalist Adrian Terrazas, formerly of The Mars Volta, guitarists Javier Reyes and Tosin Abasi of Animals as Leaders, and drummer Eric Moore of Suicidal Tendencies, with Kelela Mizanekristos and Sheera Ehrig providing backing vocals on several tracks. The group's sole release, it was recorded at Farias Productions in Los Angeles, California, and was issued in 2012 by Sumerian Records. The band name is an acronym of the musicians' last names.

The band was originally formed in 2011 as a trio consisting of Terrazas, Reyes, and Abasi, with drummer Moore being added shortly before the recording was made. In an interview, Abasi suggested that, in relation to his work with Animals as Leaders, T.R.A.M.'s music is "more open... a lot more free," and stated that his approach revolved around "changing the essential musical ideas but seeing how we could produce them differently, with different instrumentation." Terrazas noted that his goal with the album was "to try to instill a strong feeling or energy in people," and commented: "I feel that collectively we achieved this goal tenfold with this new project."

== Reception ==
Professional ratings
Review scores
Source	Rating
The Badger Herald	4.5/5 stars
The Music	4/5 stars
Sea of Tranquility	4/5 stars

A writer for The Music stated: "Lingua Franca is sure to be under-appreciated and its charm is most likely going to go over-the-top of most metal and punk purists heads. But, for the discernible listener this is a brilliantly concise and considered album. Who said jazz couldn't thrive within a metal domain?"

Natalie Zina Walschots of Exclaim! wrote: "Many albums have attempted to act as a bridge between jazz-fusion and heavy music, but few have succeeded with the subtlety and listening pleasure of Lingua Franca. The quality of the instrumentation is absolutely replete with layered harmonies and inspired, courageous improvisation. There is also a playfulness to the album that keeps the braininess in check."

The Badger Herald's Regen McCracken called the album "truly astounding," and commented: "it is truly incredible how jazzy these four musicians have made this material. More incredible still is how accessible this album is to just about anyone; it has dissonance, speed and technicality for metal fans, jazz styled music for jazz fans (obviously), and catchiness, excellent songwriting, and depth for fans of music in general."

Writing for the Los Angeles Times, Greg Burk remarked: "If you don't think extreme punishment and bent time signatures can mix with flutes, saxes and a dash of cool female vocals, try T.R.A.M.'s brilliant EP, Lingua Franca."

John O'Boyle of Sea of Tranquility wrote: "You just know that when you include these artists as a creative force you are going to get something rather unique, musicians that aren't going to conform to anyone's rule book and in fact that is exactly what has happened here... [it is] a very proficient and resplendent progressive, experimental, jazz inflected album that is peaceful and beautiful offering respite one minute then full of furious tempos and stunning time changes the next that will entertain some and confuse others."

The Louisville Cardinal's Nate Malchow stated: "This music cannot really be classified, as it is very experimental and doesn't fit into any genre I've ever heard... Each member brings creative energy to the table, much owed to their backgrounds in experimental music... On Lingua Franca, they set out to express their creative flow together, making music that fits into no preconceived notion of what it should be."

== Track listing ==
1. "Seven Ways Till Sunday" – 4:46
2. "Consider Yourself Judged" – 4:44
3. "Endeavor" – 6:24
4. "Haas Kicker" – 7:08
5. "Hollywood Swinging" – 3:36
6. "Inverted Ballad" – 3:11

== Personnel ==
- Adrian Terrazas – saxophone, flute, bass clarinet, percussion
- Javier Reyes – guitar
- Tosin Abasi – guitar
- Eric Moore – drums
- Kelela Mizanekristos – backing vocals
- Sheera Ehrig – backing vocals
