= Omar Rodríguez-López =

Puerto Rican guitarist and songwriter

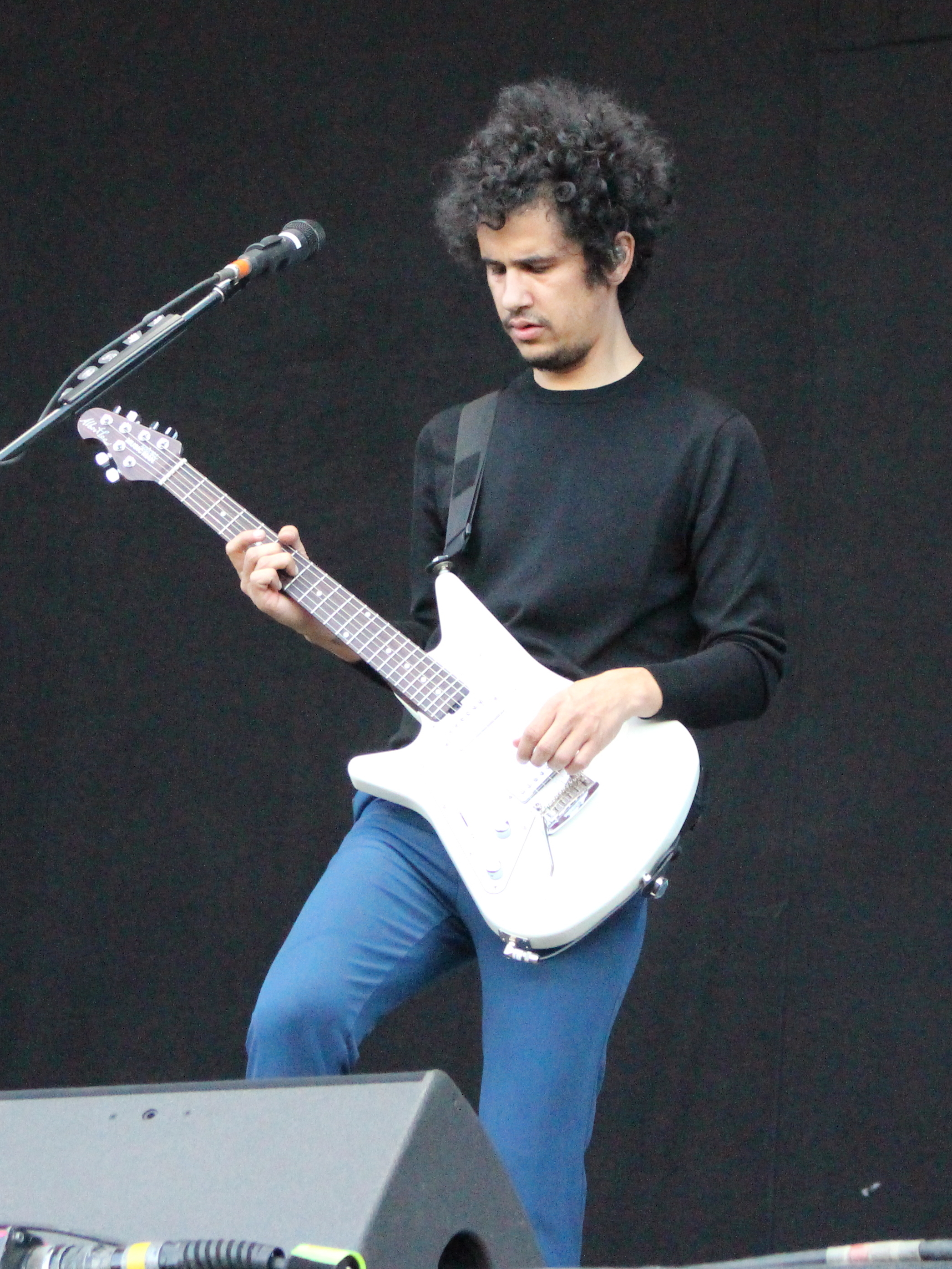
- Rodríguez-López in 2017

Background information
- Born: Omar Alfredo Rodríguez-López; September 1, 1975 (age 51); Bayamón, Puerto Rico
- Origin: El Paso, Texas, U.S.
- Genres: Progressive rock; post-hardcore; experimental rock; jazz fusion; electronica; pop; avant-garde
- Occupations: Musician; record producer; filmmaker
- Instruments: Guitar, bass, synthesizer
- Years active: 1990–present
- Member of: The Mars Volta
- Formerly of: At the Drive-In; Antemasque; Bosnian Rainbows; Crystal Fairy; De Facto; Le Butcherettes; Omar Rodriguez Lopez Group
- Website: orlprojects.com

Omar Alfredo Rodríguez-López (born September 1, 1975) is a Puerto Rican guitarist, songwriter, record producer and filmmaker. He has formed or played in several bands, including The Mars Volta, At the Drive-In, Antemasque, and Bosnian Rainbows. He was the bassist for the dub band De Facto. He is also known for his extensive solo career, which includes over fifty individual releases, and is frequently described as experimental, avant-garde, or progressive. He has also collaborated with numerous artists, such as Damo Suzuki, John Frusciante, Hans Zimmer, Buzz Osborne, Lydia Lunch, Zach Hill, El-P, Mon Laferte and Calle 13.

== Early life ==
Rodríguez-López was born in Puerto Rico and grew up in El Paso, Texas, and spent some of his childhood in South Carolina. He began playing the bass at age 12, but then switched to guitar at 15 because he "needed more strings". It was during this time that Rodríguez-López met Cedric Bixler-Zavala while practicing with friend Paul Hinojos. Since then Rodríguez-López has spent most of his career living and working with his close friend Bixler-Zavala. During this time, he frequently collaborated with his friends and future bandmates from El Paso, which included people such as Paul Hinojos, Cedric Bixler-Zavala, and the late Julio Venegas and Jeremy Ward. He attended Coronado High School in El Paso.

== Career ==
=== Startled Calf (1991–1992) ===
Rodríguez-López dropped out of high school at age 17 to go on tour with Startled Calf, an El Paso, Texas, hardcore punk band, as their vocalist, and was left stranded in Berkeley after the rest of the band were arrested. The band formed in 1991 and featured Ralph Jasso on guitar, Jimmy Hernandez on bass, and George Fraska on drums. The band broke up in 1992. Hernandez died of cancer some time after.

=== At the Drive-In (1995–2001, 2012, 2016–2018) ===
At 17, Rodríguez-López left El Paso to hitchhike around the country for a year in the early 1990s, during which he acquired an addiction to opiates. Eventually he got in touch with friend Cedric Bixler-Zavala who suggested he come back to El Paso. With the help of Bixler-Zavala, he was able to return to El Paso where he could begin to reclaim his life from addiction and join At the Drive-In as backup vocalist and bass guitarist. After receiving a record deal with Flipside Records and recording Acrobatic Tenement with the band, he became their full-time bassist before switching to guitar. After several years and two more critically acclaimed albums, for a variety of reasons, Rodríguez-López and Bixler-Zavala left At the Drive-In and the band went on "indefinite hiatus". The remaining members, Paul Hinojos, Tony Hajjar, and Jim Ward went on to form Sparta while the duo focused on other projects.

On January 9, 2012, At the Drive-In announced that they were reforming for a tour. The band released their fourth album In•ter a•li•a in 2017 before going on an indefinite hiatus in November 2018.

=== The Mars Volta (2001–2012, 2019–present) ===
Rodríguez-López and Bixler-Zavala refocused their efforts on the dub outfit called De Facto, which also included Jeremy Ward and Isaiah "Ikey" Owens, and which they had started years before while still in At the Drive-In. Eventually the same collective of musicians in De Facto would be expanded into Rodríguez-López and Bixler-Zavala's new band, The Mars Volta. Once again starting from scratch he wrote and toured with the band which consumed almost all his time and money.

On May 25, 2003, less than a month before the release of their first full-length album, De-Loused in the Comatorium, bandmate and close friend Jeremy Ward was found dead of a heroin overdose. This event, coupled with the memories of the suicide of his friend Julio Venegas years earlier, finally convinced both him and Bixler-Zavala to quit using opiates. Since then he has been clean and credited his newfound musical work ethic on his new lifestyle. The Mars Volta's second album, Frances the Mute, would later be dedicated to Ward.

During the early years of the band he also worked on a low budget movie called A Manual Dexterity which starred Jeremy Ward. The soundtrack A Manual Dexterity: Soundtrack Volume 1 was released in 2004. The release of the second volume, which was originally planned for Spring of 2005, and the film were both delayed indefinitely due to legal problems. Conflicts over ownership of certain footage and Rodríguez-López's reluctance to revisit the project which featured his late friend Jeremy Ward were both cited as reasons for the delay. However, Rodríguez-López stated that he does intend to release both Volume 2 and the film at some point in the future.

On February 8, 2009, he and his fellow Mars Volta bandmates won the Grammy for Best Hard Rock Performance.

On January 23, 2013, The Mars Volta officially announced that they had broken up, following a series of tweets posted by Cedric Bixler-Zavala stating that he had departed the band. Their future was uncertain at this point, although Rodríguez-López did not rule out the possibility of reuniting in the future.

On June 18, 2022, The Mars Volta revealed the coordinates to a location in Los Angeles, California, where fans were allowed to preview new music from the band. This was followed up by the release of the single "Blacklight Shine" and a tour announcement, marking both their first new music and first live shows in ten years. The band subsequently announced their first album in 10 years, The Mars Volta, which was released on September 16, 2022. The Mars Volta has remained active ever since.

=== Omar Rodriguez Lopez Group (2005–2012, 2018) ===
In 2005 Rodríguez-López relocated to Amsterdam, where he eventually wrote and recorded four separate albums. His first solo project was the "Omar Rodríguez-López Quintet". Rodríguez-López played several live shows in Europe with his quintet, which in 2005 also included three members of The Mars Volta Group (Juan Alderete, Marcel Rodríguez-López and Adrián Terrazas-González) and Money Mark.

The songs featured on this tour later appeared on the album Omar Rodriguez. It was characterized by long, improvisational songs with Dutch titles and no lyrics. The Quintet also performed live with Damo Suzuki, parts of which were recorded and incorporated into a 25-minute EP titled Please Heat This Eventually, which was released in 2007.

During this time Rodríguez-López was also working on The Mars Volta's 2006 record Amputechture and composing the score to the film El Búfalo de la Noche simultaneously to his work with the quintet.

On May 29, 2007, Se Dice Bisonte, No Búfalo was released. It was the third full-length solo album by Rodríguez-López. It featured performances by Mars Volta members Cedric Bixler-Zavala, Marcel Rodríguez-López, Juan Alderete, Adrián Terrazas-González as well as cameos by Money Mark, John Frusciante, and Jon Theodore. It was written and recorded between 2005 and 2006 in California and Amsterdam.

The Quintet later resurfaced in 2007, now known as "The Rodríguez-López Group" to perform on the "white" stage at the Fuji Rock Festival in Japan on July 28. Performing with the group for the first time were singer Cedric Bixler-Zavala and drummer Thomas Pridgen.

=== Solo releases (2004–present) ===
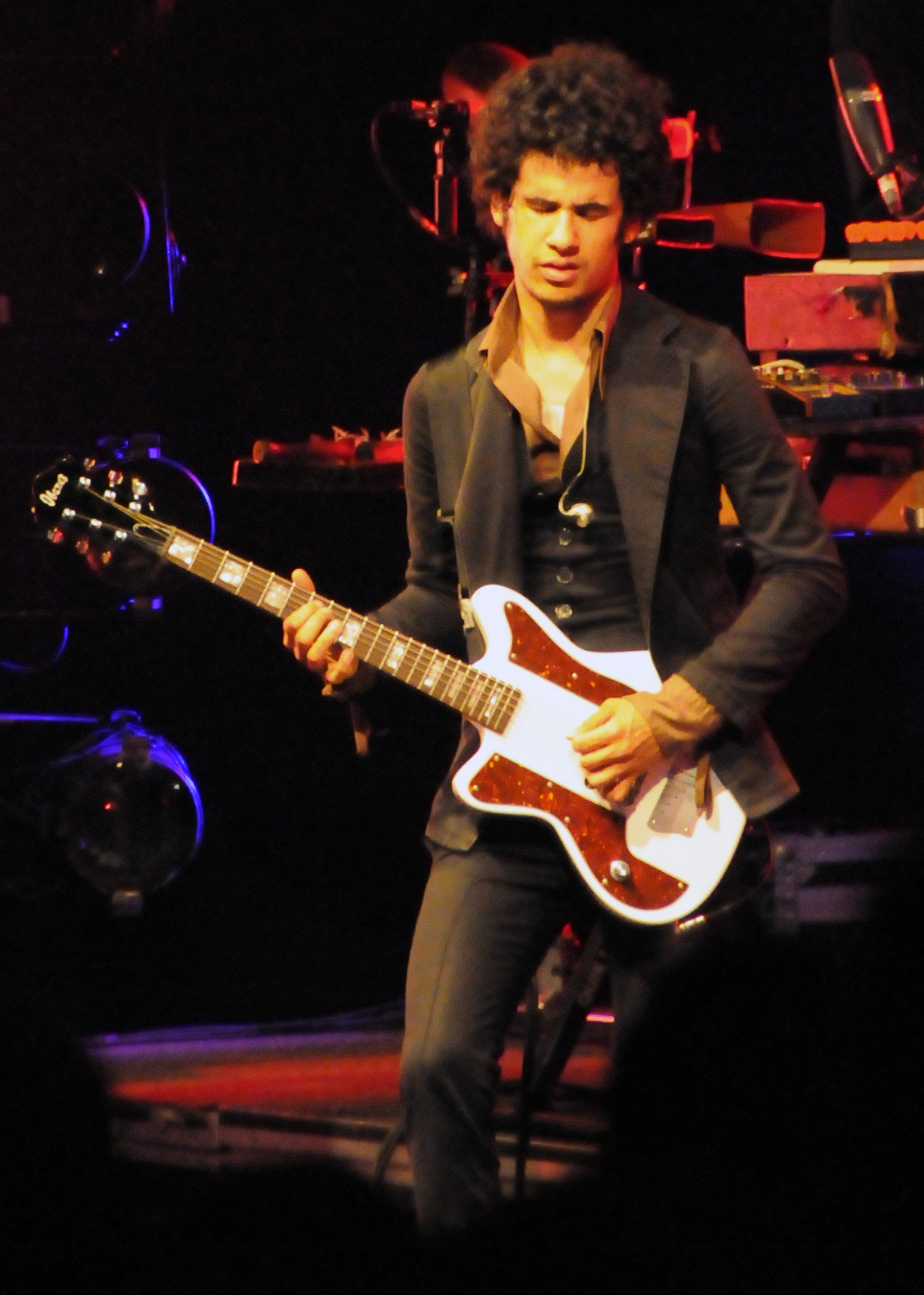
Rodríguez-López performing in 2008

On October 8, 2007, the EP Omar Rodriguez-Lopez & Lydia Lunch, a collaboration with spoken word poet Lydia Lunch, was released. The Apocalypse Inside of an Orange is a double LP featuring the original quintet and was released on vinyl November 20, 2007. It was also released for digital download. Calibration, a record that Rodríguez-López recorded during his stay in Amsterdam, was released February 5, 2008. It was described as being influenced by electronic music and acid-jazz.

On June 10, 2008, a recording titled Omar Rodriguez-Lopez & Jeremy Michael Ward was released. It was a collaboration between the two and was recorded in 2001 before the formation of The Mars Volta. The LP consists of various ambient tracks based on field recordings in the musique concrète tradition. Rodríguez-López has continued to release a series of albums recorded in 2001 which include Absence Makes the Heart Grow Fungus and Minor Cuts and Scrapes in the Bushes Ahead, both released in late 2008.

Another album, Old Money was released in October 2008, with a vinyl version becoming available in early 2009 on the Stones Throw record label. Sonny Kay, co-owner of the former Gold Standard Labs label with Omar, created the album covers (and has done so for the majority of future Omar releases). Two Omar Rodríguez-López solo albums were released in Europe on January 26, 2009, from the Netherlands-based record label Willie Anderson Recordings: Megaritual and Despair. Despair is best described as a field recording, while Megaritual is a collaboration jam between Omar and his brother, Marcel Rodríguez-López.

In mid-2009, a new entity has been created called El Grupo Nuevo de Omar Rodriguez Lopez (the New Omar Rodriguez-Lopez Group) to release the first in a series of three recordings completed in 2006. Thus far these recordings have only been known as the Omar and Zach Hill collaborations. The first recording titled Cryptomnesia was released on May 5, 2009. Vocals written and performed by Bixler-Zavala were recorded in 2008. The lineup for this entity is: Omar Rodríguez-López on guitar, Cedric Bixler-Zavala on vocals, Zach Hill on drums, Jonathan Hischke on synth bass, and Juan Alderete on bass.

The Omar Rodriguez-Lopez Group toured Europe in March 2009, supported by Zechs Marquise.

At the end of 2009, Rodríguez-López released three albums, Los Sueños de un Hígado, Xenophanes and Solar Gambling digitally through Rodríguez-López Productions. While Xenophanes was also released on CD and vinyl, Los Suenos De Un Higado and Solar Gambling only had a limited vinyl release. Rodríguez-López also created a video for "Asco Que Conmueve los Puntos Erógenos", from Xenophanes, and posted it on YouTube on November 30, 2009.

In January 2010, Ciencia de los Inútiles was released under a new group, El Trio de Omar Rodriguez-Lopez. The trio features Rodríguez-López on acoustic guitar, Ximena Sariñana on vocals and Aaron Cruz on upright bass. A video for "Miércoles" was also released. In May 2010, he released a collaboration titled Omar Rodriguez-Lopez & John Frusciante with John Frusciante, free of charge through his website, with the option to donate. All money raised will go to the Keep Music in Schools programs. On May 30, 2010, the album Sepulcros de Miel by Omar Rodriguez-Lopez Quartet was digitally released, which also featured Frusciante.

The album Tychozorente was scheduled for release on November 1, 2010; however, it received an early release on September 14, 2010, as a digital download. Another album, titled Cizaña de los Amores, was digitally released on October 11, 2010. CD and vinyl versions of both albums are only available in Europe. Mantra Hiroshima, another Omar and Zach Hill collaboration, was digitally released on November 29, followed next day by Dōitashimashite, album of live material recorded in September during the Omar Rodriguez-Lopez Group's first US tour. A video for "Agua Dulce de Pulpo" from the album Un Escorpión Perfumado was also released during that period, and the album itself was released on December 20 in digital form, with CD and vinyl versions to follow.

On April 16, 2011, Omar released Telesterion, a compilation album featuring 38 songs from Omar's solo albums. Although this has been the only release of 2011, other projects have been hinted at, such as Двойственность вздохов (Russian for Duality of Sighs), a documentary about the Omar Rodriguez-Lopez Group's Russian mini-tour, directed by Omar and shot by Paco Ibarra. The Vinyl edition of Telesterion also contained artwork for 6 solo albums that have yet to be released, and featured a new track, "Cásate Colmillo", off of an album supposedly titled The Somnambulis.

On July 7, 2016, Ipecac Records announced that they would release 12 albums by Omar, fortnightly, until December 2016. They were recorded in the period 2008–2013 and one featured The Mars Volta line-up and a guest appearance by John Frusciante. The first album Sworn Virgins was released digitally on July 15, 2016, and featured the single "To Kill a Chi Chi". Recorded in El Paso and Zapopan, the other titles include Corazones, Blind Worms Pious Swine, Arañas En La Sombra, Umbrella Mistress, El Bien Y Mal Nos Une, Cell Phone Bikini, Infinity Drips, Weekly Mansions, Zapopan, Nom De Guerre Cabal, and Some Need It Lonely.

=== Bosnian Rainbows and Antemasque (2012–2018) ===
In 2012, with Mars Volta going on hiatus, Rodríguez-López formed a solo band that eventually took the name Bosnian Rainbows. It consists of Deantoni Parks (drums, keyboards), Teri Gender Bender (vocals) and Nicci Kasper (keyboards). They released one self-titled album in June 2013. On April 8, 2014, Omar announced a new musical project called Antemasque with former At the Drive-In and Mars Volta bandmates Cedric Bixler-Zavala (vocals) and David Elitch (drums) as well as Flea, the bassist for the Red Hot Chili Peppers. The group released their first song, "4AM". Flea said that Antemasque is a project between Omar and Cedric, and that he is only a contributing artist.

As of 2018, both Bosnian Rainbows and Antemasque have essentially been put on hold due to touring commitments of At the Drive-In and The Mars Volta.

== Other media ==
Aside from music, Rodríguez-López is also involved in filmmaking and photography. Beginning in his At the Drive-in days he started to document many kinds of things: live shows, sound checks, dressing rooms, hotels, airport lounges, sightseeing, encounters with colleagues. Since 2001 he has produced many films, of which The Sentimental Engine Slayer was the first to be released. Rodríguez-López wrote, directed, produced and starred in the film, which was premiered at the International Film Festival Rotterdam in February 2010 and saw the DVD release in January 2013. Another film directed by Omar, Los Chidos, was premiered in March 2012 at SXSW. Furthermore, Rodríguez-López and Hans Zimmer worked together to compose the score for the 2009 Guillermo Arriaga film The Burning Plain. The film was his second collaboration with the writer/director after scoring the 2007 film El Búfalo de la Noche with The Mars Volta; in addition to some original material, the score also includes material used in Amputechture. Rodríguez-López's first photo book, Hunters in High Heels documenting the years from 2000 to 2006, was slated to release in 2013 but was postponed for unknown reasons. It was finally released in late 2024.

== Musicianship ==
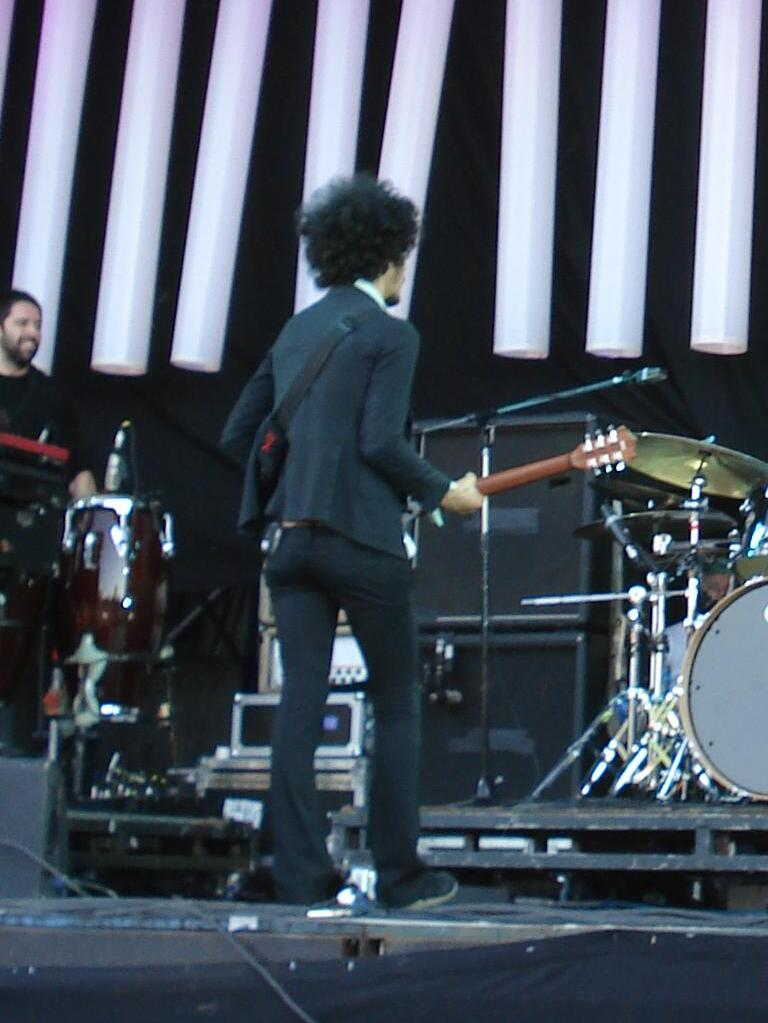
Omar, with back toward the audience, directs the Mars Volta.

=== Style ===
Rodríguez-López's compositional and playing style is characterized by, among other factors, riffs, melodies based in minor modes, changing meters, unresolving dissonances (in particular a heavy use of the tritone), chromatic passages, and lengthy improvisation. He is also known for his vast array of effects pedals; in a feature appearing in Guitar World, Rodríguez-López stated that he "began to see effects as allies in my war against the guitar". In that interview he also stated that he hated the guitar for a very long time. He only utilized it because it was the instrument his bandmates could "relate to". He said he "wrestled" guitar by adding effects and playing oddly to attempt "making it sound like anything besides this thing I hate—the guitar!". However, he claimed to feel more comfortable with the instrument on Amputechture.

Rodríguez-López plays guitar left-handed. He has cited salsa pianist and bandleader Larry Harlow as his primary influence. Both Rodríguez-López and bandmate Cedric Bixler-Zavala have recorded with former Can lead singer Damo Suzuki for the Please Heat This Eventually EP. In the progressive rock genre in which The Mars Volta are often categorized, he has professed that he "like[s] a lot of those groups, particularly King Crimson and early Genesis." As such, he has cited his main and clearest influence Frank Zappa, Crimson's Robert Fripp, jazz fusion guitarist John McLaughlin as well as hardcore punk and hard rock guitarists Greg Ginn and Jimi Hendrix respectively. He has also named Siouxsie, Missing Persons, Wayne Shorter as being among "all the greats" along with Steve Reich, Tangerine Dream, Tchaikovsky, Tom Petty and Marvin Gaye." He has also stated that film is a primary influence on him, likening his recording style to that of a film director, where the "scenes are shot out of sequence and the final creation is in the hands of the director.".

=== Equipment ===
Omar has endorsed Ibanez guitars since The Mars Volta's inception in 2001. Previously he used Squier Super-Sonic guitars while playing with At the Drive-In. He also recorded De-Loused in the Comatorium with a Gibson SG II from the early 1970s which he also used in live improv shows with Flea and John Frusciante. He uses Seymour Duncan JB Jr. pickups as well. Although he tunes to E standard tuning, Omar uses Ernie Ball .013-.056 gauge strings with a wound G string, saying that "they feel more real than the really thin ones". Omar also plays through an Orange Rockerverb combo amp as well. In recent years, Omar has taken a minimalist approach to his pedals, which at one point was a very complex setup. During The Mars Volta's 2011 tour with Soundgarden, he used a Boss DD5 Digital Delay, an MXR Phase 90, an Electro-Harmonix Memory Boy analog delay, a Boss PS-6 Harmonist, a Line 6 M9 Stompbox Modeler, an MXR M133 Micro Amp, an Ibanez WH10V2 wah-wah, an Ibanez TC7 tri-mode chorus, and a Line 6 DL4 delay modeler.

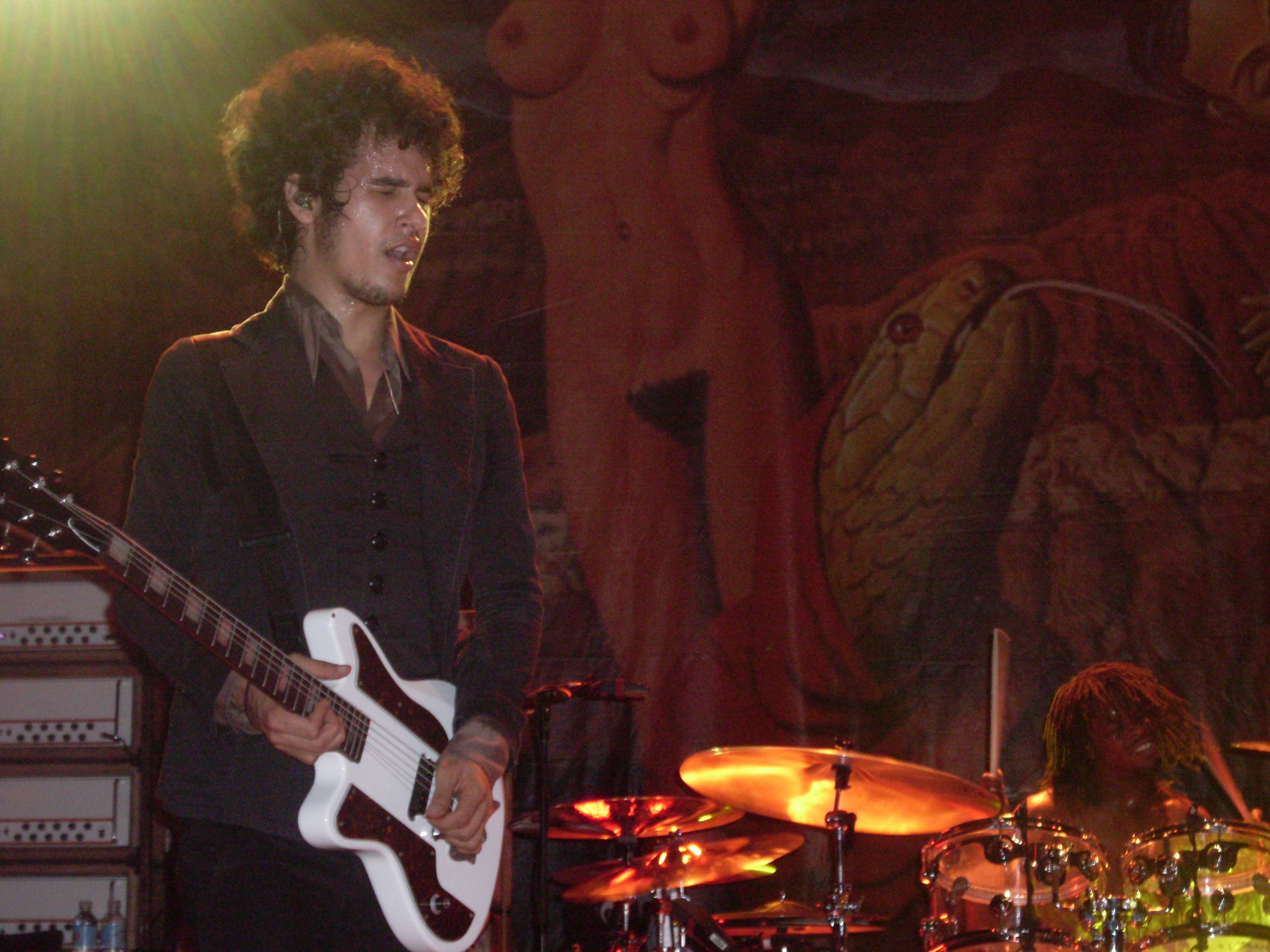
Rodríguez-López playing his signature Ibanez ORM-1 guitar

During The Mars Volta's final shows and At the Drive-In's reunion tour, Rodríguez-López switched back to a full-sized Ibanez Jetking guitar, although retaining his preferred single-pickup and volume knob configuration and 24" neck scale. In a recent interview with TC Electronic, he is seen using a blue Ibanez Jetking with two full-size humbuckers.

While performing with Bosnian Rainbows, Rodríguez-López began to use a mid-1960s era left-handed Supro 3/4 scale guitar with a single pickup in the bridge position. Shortly afterwards, he was seen playing a custom Ibanez guitar that closely resembled his Supro. In addition, Rodríguez-López now uses flatwound strings on his guitar. Rodríguez-López's pedalboard for Bosnian Rainbows consisted of a Boss TU-3 Chromatic Tuner, an Empress Superdelay, a Blackout Effects Whetstone analog phaser, a Catalinbread Semaphore tremolo pedal, a Boss DD-5 Digital Delay, an EarthQuaker Devices Rainbow Machine, an Empress Fuzz pedal, a Catalinbread Calisto chorus/vibrato pedal, and a Boss SL-20 slicer.

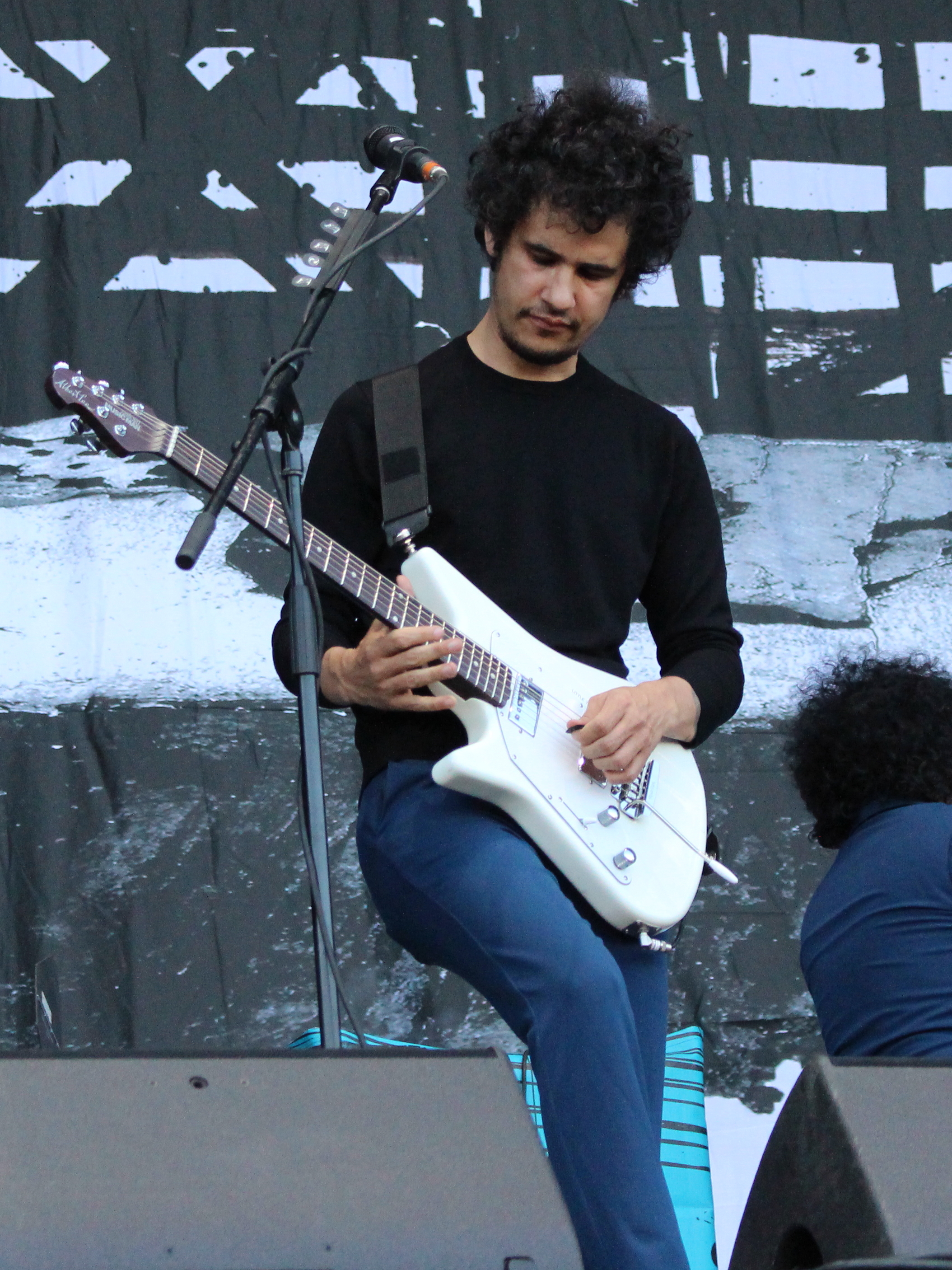
Rodríguez-López playing an Ernie Ball Music Man Albert Lee HH

From 2015 onwards, Rodríguez-López began playing Ernie Ball Music Man guitars, notably the Albert Lee HH and St. Vincent models, as well as his signature Mariposa model from 2019 onwards.

==== Signature guitars ====
In 2008, Ibanez released the ORM-1 Omar Rodriguez-Lopez signature guitar, which was produced through 2012 and based on the Ibanez Jetking.

Rodríguez-López designed and released the Mariposa signature guitar with Ernie Ball Music Man in 2019. It has an okoume body in an angular shape with a laser-etched floral pickguard, and two custom humbuckers featuring two volume knobs with a tethered tone circuit, which creates variations in treble response when the pickups are set at different levels.

=== As producer ===
Rodríguez-López is also notable for his recording, producing and songwriting techniques. He has claimed that he is "ignorant of music theory" and that thus he lacks knowledge in writing music in standard notation, claiming that his songwriting "comes from emotion completely". Rodríguez-López claims to write all of the music for his projects, then dictates the performance to the musicians involved.

In addition to his producing credits with The Mars Volta and his solo albums, he also produced the only LP from the defunct LA-based band Radio Vago and in 2009, handled the production of a recording titled "Terra Incognita" from actress/singer Juliette Lewis' band The New Romantiques. Omar also produced (as well as contributed bass to) Sin Sin Sin, the debut LP from the band Le Butcherettes, which was released in 2011 on Rodriguez-Lopez Productions.

== Personal life ==
Rodríguez-López says he enjoys the company of his close friends and family when not fulfilling obligations to his many bands and projects. He has been a vegetarian for most of his life.

In the documentary film Omar and Cedric: If This Ever Gets Weird, Rodríguez-López discussed instances of homophobia that he suffered as a result of his "fluid" sexuality, and opened up on having been in a romantic relationship with bandmate Jeremy Ward which was kept in secret.

Rodríguez-López dated singer-songwriter and actress Ximena Sariñana from 2008 to 2011. His current partner is musician and singer Teresa Suárez (aka Teri Gender Bender).

== Discography ==
As a solo artist

- A Manual Dexterity: Soundtrack Volume One (2004)
- Omar Rodriguez (2005)
- Se Dice Bisonte, No Búfalo (2007)
- The Apocalypse Inside of an Orange (2007; as Omar Rodriguez Lopez Quintet)
- Calibration (Is Pushing Luck and Key Too Far) (2007)
- Absence Makes the Heart Grow Fungus (2008)
- Minor Cuts and Scrapes in the Bushes Ahead (2008)
- Old Money (2008)
- Megaritual (2009)
- Despair (2009)
- Cryptomnesia (2009; as El Grupo Nuevo De Omar Rodriguez Lopez)
- Los Sueños de un Hígado (2009; Live; as Omar Rodriguez Lopez Group)
- Xenophanes (2009)
- Solar Gambling (2009)
- Ciencia de los Inútiles (2010; as El Trio De Omar Rodriguez Lopez)
- Sepulcros de Miel (2010; as "Omar Rodriguez Lopez Quartet")
- Tychozorente (2010)
- Cizaña de los Amores (2010)
- Mantra Hiroshima (2010)
- どういたしまして (Dōitashimashite; 2010; live; as Omar Rodriguez Lopez Group)
- Un Escorpión Perfumado (2010)
- Telesterion (2011; compilation)
- Un Corazón de Nadie (2012)
- Saber, Querer, Osar y Callar (2012)
- Octopus Kool Aid (2012)
- Equinox (2013)
- Woman Gives Birth to Tomato! (2013; as Omar Rodriguez Lopez Group)
- Unicorn Skeleton Mask (2013)
- ¿Sólo Extraño? (2013)
- Sworn Virgins (2016)
- Corazones (2016)
- Blind Worms Pious Swine (2016)
- Arañas en la Sombra (2016)
- Umbrella Mistress (2016)
- El Bien y Mal Nos Une (2016)
- Cell Phone Bikini (2016)
- Infinity Drips (2016)
- Weekly Mansions (2016)
- Zapopan (2016)
- Nom de Guerre Cabal (2016)
- Some Need It Lonely (2016)
- A Lovejoy (2016)
- Roman Lips (2017)
- Zen Thrills (2017)
- Chocolate Tumor Hormone Parade (2017) Live 2012
- Ensayo de un Desaparecido (2017)
- Azul, Mis Dientes (2017)
- Gorilla Preacher Cartel (2017)
- Killing Tingled Lifting Retreats (2017)
- Solid State Mercenaries (2017)
- Birth of a Ghost (2017)
- Doom Patrol (2017)
- The Clouds Hill Tapes Parts I, II & III (2020)
- Amor de Frances (2023; box set)
- Live At Clouds Hill (2024, 2026) recorded 2018
- Is It the Clouds? (2024)

Collaborations

- Please Heat This Eventually (EP) (2006; as Omar Rodriguez-Lopez and Damo Suzuki; featuring Omar Rodriguez Lopez Group)
- Omar Rodriguez-Lopez & Lydia Lunch (EP) (2007; as Omar Rodriguez-Lopez and Lydia Lunch; featuring Omar Rodriguez Lopez Group)
- Omar Rodriguez-Lopez & Jeremy Michael Ward (2008; as Omar Rodriguez-Lopez & Jeremy Ward)
- The Burning Plain soundtrack (promo only) (2008; as Hans Zimmer and Omar Rodriguez-Lopez)
- Omar Rodriguez-Lopez & John Frusciante (2010; as Omar Rodriguez-Lopez and John Frusciante)
- Faust & Omar Rodriguez Lopez Live at Clouds Hill (2012; part of Live at Clouds Hill box set; as Faust and Omar Rodriguez-Lopez)

With Startled Calf

- Can't Change Me (1991)
- I Love Being Trendy (1992)

With Jerk

- Things You Can Do With A 20 Dollar Bill... (1993)

With Food Plaza

- Punk Soccer (1994)

With At the Drive-In

- Acrobatic Tenement (1997)
- El Gran Orgo (1997)
- In/Casino/Out (1998, re-release 2004)
- Vaya (1999, re-release 2004)
- Sunshine / At the Drive-In (2000)
- Relationship of Command (2000, re-release 2004)
- This Station Is Non-Operational (2005)
- in•ter a•li•a (2017)
- Diamanté (2017)

With De Facto

- 456132015 (2001)
- Megaton Shotblast (2001)
- How Do You Dub? You Fight For Dub, You Plug Dub In (2001)
- Légende du Scorpion a Quatre Queues (2001)

With The Mars Volta

- Tremulant (2002)
- De-Loused in the Comatorium (2003)
- Live (2003)
- Frances the Mute (2005)
- Scabdates (2005)
- Amputechture (2006)
- The Bedlam in Goliath (2008)
- Octahedron (2009)
- Noctourniquet (2012)
- La Realidad De Los Sueños (2021)
- Landscape Tantrums (2021)
- The Mars Volta (2022)
- Que Dios Te Maldiga Mi Corazón (2023)
- Lucro Sucio; Los Ojos del Vacío (2025)
- Lucro Sucio; Unfinished Business (2026)

With Le Butcherettes

- Sin Sin Sin (2011)
- Cry Is for the Flies (2014)

With Bosnian Rainbows

- Bosnian Rainbows Live at Clouds Hill (10" EP) (2012; part of Live at Clouds Hill box set)
- Bosnian Rainbows (2013)

With Kimono Kult

- Hiding in the Light (2014)

With Antemasque

- Antemasque (2014)
- Saddle on the Atom Bomb (unreleased)

With Crystal Fairy

- Crystal Fairy (2017)

Guest appearances

- Rise Above: 24 Black Flag Songs to Benefit the West Memphis Three by Various Artists (Produced by Henry Rollins) (2002)
- Shadows Collide with People by John Frusciante (2004)
- Inside of Emptiness by John Frusciante (2004)
- Curtains by John Frusciante (2005)
- Radio Vago by Radio Vago (2005)
- "Live Private Booths" by Alavaz Relxib Cirdec (uncredited) (2005)
- The Phantom Syndrome by Coaxial (2005)
- Stadium Arcadium by Red Hot Chili Peppers (2006)
- I'll Sleep When You're Dead by El-P (2007)
- New Amerykah Part One by Erykah Badu (2008)
- Leslie White by Taka Takaz (2009)
- Hechizo (Las Canciones De Bunbury Y Héroes Del Silencio Cantadas Por Los Artistas De Los Dos Lados Del Atlántico) (2010)
- Sympathy for Delicious OST by Burnt the Diphthongs (2010)
- El Rey Del Camino by Troker (2010)
- Negativa by Hour of the Monarchy (2010)
- Entren Los Que Quieran by Calle 13 (2010)
- The Golden Age of Knowhere by Funeral Party (2011)
- Ximena Sariñana by Ximena Sariñana (2011)
- Souvenir: The Singles 2004-2012 by Kaiser Chiefs (2012)
- Tercer Solar by Apolo (2014)
- Immortal by Los Daniels (2016)
- "Mal Hombre" by Ana Gabriel (2017)
- Gemini by The Sure Fire Soul Ensemble (2025)

As producer

- El Gran Orgo by At the Drive-In (1997) co-produced with Bryan Jones and other members of at the Drive-In
- Sunshine / At the Drive-In by at the Drive-In (2000) co-produced with other members of at the Drive-In
- De-Loused in the Comatorium by The Mars Volta (2003) co-produced with Rick Rubin
- Live by The Mars Volta (2003) co-produced with Cedric Bixler-Zavala
- A Manual Dexterity: Soundtrack Volume 1 (2004)
- Frances the Mute by The Mars Volta (2005)
- Scabdates by The Mars Volta (2005)
- Omar Rodriguez (2005)
- Radio Vago by Radio Vago (2005)
- Amputechture by The Mars Volta (2006)
- Please Heat This Eventually (2007)
- Se Dice Bisonte, No Búfalo (2007)
- Omar Rodriguez-Lopez & Lydia Lunch (2007)
- The Apocalypse Inside of an Orange (2007)
- Calibration (2007)
- The Bedlam in Goliath by The Mars Volta (2008)
- Omar Rodriguez Lopez & Jeremy Michael Ward (2008)
- Absence Makes the Heart Grow Fungus (2008)
- Minor Cuts and Scrapes in the Bushes Ahead (2008)
- Old Money (2008)
- Megaritual (2009)
- Despair (2009)
- Cryptomnesia (2009)
- Octahedron by The Mars Volta (2009)
- Terra Incognita by Juliette and The New Romantiques (2009)
- Los Sueños de un Higado (2009)
- Xenophanes (2009)
- Solar Gambling (2009)
- Ciencia de los Inútiles (2010)
- Omar Rodriguez Lopez & John Frusciante (2010)
- Sepulcros de Miel (2010)
- Tychozorente (2010) co-produced with Elvin Estela
- Cizaña de los Amores (2010)
- Mantra Hiroshima (2010)
- どういたしまして (Dōitashimashite; 2010)
- Un Escorpión Perfumado (2010)
- Telesterion (2011; compilation)
- Sin Sin Sin by Le Butcherettes (2011)
- Noctourniquet by The Mars Volta (2012)
- Un Corazón de Nadie (2012)
- Saber, Querer, Osar y Callar (2012)
- Octopus Kool Aid (2012)
- Equinox (2013)
- Woman Gives Birth to Tomato! (2013)
- Unicorn Skeleton Mask (2013)
- ¿Sólo Extraño? (2013)
- Guardián by Apolo (2015)
- A Raw Youth by Le Butcherettes (2015)
- Norma by Mon Laferte (2018)
- Sed by Kianí Medina (2024)

== Filmography ==
=== As performer ===
Feature films

- All Tomorrow's Parties (2009)
- The Sentimental Engine Slayer (2010)

=== As director ===
Feature films

- The Sentimental Engine Slayer (2010)
- Los Chidos (2011)
- Amalia (2018)
- Luna Rosa: La 7ª ascensión de Atabey (2025)

Music videos

- "Inertiatic ESP" (2003) for The Mars Volta
- "L'Via L'Viaquez" (2005) for The Mars Volta
- "The Widow" (2005) for The Mars Volta
- "Wax Simulacra" (2008) for The Mars Volta
- "Aberinkula" (2008) for The Mars Volta
- "Ilyena" (2008) for The Mars Volta
- "Goliath" (2008) for The Mars Volta
- "Askepios" (2008) for The Mars Volta
- "Calibration" (2008)
- "Cotopaxi" (2009) for The Mars Volta
- "Since We've Been Wrong" (2009) for The Mars Volta
- "Asco Que Conmueve los Puntos Erógenos" (2009)
- "Miercoles" (2010)
- "Polaridad" (2010)
- "Agua Dulce De Pulpo" (2010)
- "Shine Down" (2011) for Ximena Sariñana
- "Pineapple Face" (2016)
- "My Mallely" (2016) for Le Butcherettes

Collaborations

- "Metronome Arthritis" (1999) video for At the Drive-In with Dan Tierney and other members of At the Drive-In
- "One Armed Scissor" (2000) video for At the Drive-In with other members of At the Drive-In

== Bibliography ==
- Hunters in High Heels (2025)
