= Ciencia de los Inútiles =

Studio album by Omar Rodríguez-López
- Released: February 14, 2010
- Genres: Acoustic, folk jazz, experimental
- Length: 36:21
- Label: Rodriguez Lopez Productions
- Producer: Omar Rodríguez-López

Omar Rodríguez-López solo chronology
Solar Gambling (2009)	Ciencia de los Inútiles (2010)	Omar Rodriguez-Lopez & John Frusciante (2010)

Omar Rodríguez-López chronology
Octahedron (2009)	Ciencia de los Inútiles (2010)	Sin Sin Sin (2011)

Ciencia de los Inútiles (Science of the Useless) is the fourteenth solo album by Omar Rodríguez-López, this time under the name El Trío de Omar Rodríguez-López. Written and recorded in Mexico City, it's the first solely acoustic work by Rodríguez-López and features a reduced lineup of three members. It was released for download on February 14, 2010 via the Rodriguez-Lopez productions website, along with a limited pressing of 1,000 copies on vinyl. The album was then reissued on vinyl on January 19, 2024, by Clouds Hill.

== Overview ==
Featuring Ximena Sariñana on vocals and Aaron Cruz Bravo on double bass, Ciencia de los Inútiles is the first completely acoustic album by Rodriguez-Lopez, with only occasional electric guitar playing and no percussion. According to the liner notes, the album was written and recorded live with little to no overdubs in 3 days, each song having been conceived just before recording. No more than 3 takes were allowed for each song, the first take having been used as final in most cases.

The song titles (except "Noche Dia") correspond with Spanish names for each day of the week. Though they start with Monday (Lunes) and end with Sunday (Domingo), the titles are not in day order otherwise. Initially, track listing for the digital release on Bandcamp had the tracks ordered according to days of the week, with "Noche Día" ending the album, however they were later re-shuffled for unknown reasons; vinyl release also featured the new track list.

An official music video was released for the track "Miércoles" on February 27, 2010.

== Reception ==
The album has been described as emotional, melancholy, and introspective. The simplicity with merely an ensemble of three has also been complimented. Moreover, Ciencia de los Inútiles has been noted for its slow, Spanish guitar and sedating vocals. Sputnikmusic described the album as "normal" compared to Rodríguez-López's usual frenetic projects. Sputnik further praises Sariñana's voice, describing it as ethereal and beautiful. The record is considered one of the most quintessential in Rodríguez-López's discography.

== Track listing ==
All tracks are written by Omar Rodríguez-López.

No.	Title	Length
1.	"Lunes" (Monday)	4:31
2.	"Viernes" (Friday)	4:12
3.	"Miércoles" (Wednesday)	5:27
4.	"Noche Día" (Night Day)	4:47
5.	"Martes" (Tuesday)	3:56
6.	"Jueves" (Thursday)	6:24
7.	"Sábado" (Saturday)	3:52
8.	"Domingo" (Sunday)	3:17
Total length:		36:21

== Personnel ==
- Omar Rodríguez-López − guitars
- Ximena Sariñana Rivera − vocals, Rhodes
- Aaron Cruz Bravo − double bass

=== Production ===
- Omar Rodríguez-López − producer, recording
- Lars Stalfors − mixing
- Isaiah Abolin − recording
- Jon Debaun − recording
- Pete Lyman − mastering

=== Artwork ===
- Sonny Kay − art direction, design

== Release history ==
Format	Date	Label
Digital	February 14, 2010	Sargent House / Rodriguez Lopez Productions
Vinyl	June 1, 2010	Sargent House / Rodriguez Lopez Productions
Vinyl	January 19, 2024	Clouds Hill
