= Omar Rodriguez Lopez & John Frusciante =

Studio album by Omar Rodríguez-López & John Frusciante
- Released: April 30, 2010
- Recorded: Spring 2003
- Genre: Experimental rock
- Length: 28:49
- Label: Sargent House; Rodriguez-Lopez Productions
- Producer: Omar Rodríguez-López

Omar Rodríguez-López & John Frusciante chronology
| The Special 12 Singles Series (2005) | Omar Rodriguez Lopez & John Frusciante (2010) | Sepulcros de Miel (2010) |

Omar Rodríguez-López chronology
| Ciencia de los Inútiles (2010) | Omar Rodriguez-Lopez & John Frusciante (2010) | Sepulcros de Miel (2010) |

John Frusciante chronology
| The Empyrean (2009) | Omar Rodriguez-Lopez & John Frusciante (2010) | Speed Dealer Moms EP (2010) |

Professional ratings
Review scores
| Source | Rating |
|---|---|
| Sound Colour Vibration | Positive |

Omar Rodriguez Lopez & John Frusciante is a collaborative studio album by American artists Omar Rodríguez-López, guitarist of The Mars Volta, and John Frusciante, guitarist of the Red Hot Chili Peppers. The record was digitally released on April 30, 2010. It is the twentieth release by Omar, and their second collaboration following 2005's "0=2" vinyl single, which appears on this record along with its b-side, "0". These two tracks have been available digitally since October 3, 2006. This album was a free download with the option to donate for a period of time. All money raised has gone to "Keep Music in Schools". The album can now be downloaded for $3.99.

In December 2010, the album was released on CD in Japan through Sleepwell Records and enjoyed success, ending up on Amazon Japan's bestseller list as #2 in the Music > Alternative Rock and #22 in Music > Rock section.

The album cover and art is from a picture that Omar took of John Frusciante. The guitar featured is one of Frusciante's notable instruments - a 1962 Fender Jaguar.

In September 2012, it was announced that the album was being re-issued through Rodriguez Lopez Productions/Sargent House, this time both on vinyl and CD. The second vinyl pressing is on transparent red vinyl and limited to 1,000 copies, with the first 500 copies ordered containing a 11x17" folded poster designed from the cover of the album.

As of January 10, 2013, the Vinyl reissue had sold out according to Sargent House / Rodriguez Lopez Productions' official distributor's website, Hellomerch.com. Therefore, making it the fastest Omar Rodriguez Lopez limited release to sell out (2 months, 10 days from the official release).

== Track listing ==
All tracks are written by Omar Rodríguez-López and John Frusciante.

| No. | Title | Length |
|---|---|---|
| 1. | "4:17 am" | 3:25 |
| 2. | "0=2" | 3:53 |
| 3. | "LOE" | 4:42 |
| 4. | "ZIM" | 3:56 |
| 5. | "VTA" | 3:49 |
| 6. | "0" | 4:12 |
| 7. | "5:45 am" | 4:57 |
| Total length: | | 28:49 |

== Personnel ==
- Omar Rodríguez-López – guitars, bass, synthesizer, drum machine
- John Frusciante – guitars, bass, synthesizer

== Release history ==
| Format | Date | Label |
|---|---|---|
| Digital | April 30, 2010 | Sargent House / Rodriguez Lopez Productions |
| Vinyl | August 15, 2010 | Sargent House / Rodriguez Lopez Productions |
| CD (Japan) | December 15, 2010 | Sleepwell |
| CD | September 13, 2012 | Sargent House / Rodriguez Lopez Productions |
| Vinyl (reissue) | November 1, 2012 | Sargent House / Rodriguez Lopez Productions |
| Vinyl | December 2023 | Clouds Hill |
