= George Fraska =

George Fraska (Hosni)
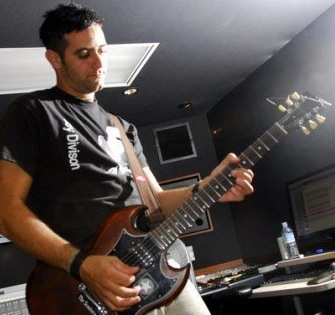
- At West Lake Recording Studios in Los Angeles, CA

Background information
- Birth name: George Hosni
- Born: August 3, 1975 (age 49); Monrovia, Liberia, Africa
- Origin: El Paso, Texas
- Genres: Punk rock, new wave, ska, reggae, electronic, skate rock, post-punk, industrial
- Occupation(s): Musician, record producer, record label owner
- Instrument(s): Guitar, bass, drums, keyboards, synthesizer, drum machine, vocals
- Years active: 1991–present
- Website: Red Ear Records

George Fraska (Hosni) (born August 3, 1975) is a songwriter and producer, who was born in Monrovia, Liberia, Africa. He is known for his role as lead vocalist, guitarist, and drummer for several underground bands such as Startled Calf, The Smiley Kids, Four!, the Scooterz and many other projects. Including an Operation Ivy coverband called The Freeze Up's and a Minor Threat coverband called Minor Treat.

== Biography ==
Fraska is a multi-instrumentalist who plays drums, keyboards, bass, and guitar. In 1991, when he was 16, Fraska founded his first official band, Startled Calf, as drummer along with his friends Ralph Jasso, Omar Rodríguez-López, and Jimmy Hernandez. The band was only around for a couple years but accomplished much in the local scene. Band members later went on to start other successful projects. The first Startled Calf releases were on cassette.

In the mid-1990s Fraska played in several different underground projects such as FOUR! Food Plaza, Jerk, Disgruntled Fish, The Messy Hairs, and Three Frisky Kids...FOUR! became his priority as they got busy and started touring more and more, playing shows with many bands such as Reel Big Fish, AFI, Propagandhi, The Aquabats, Less Than Jake, Swinging Utters, The Queers, Against All Authority, T.S.O.L./Joykiller, Rancid, Suicide Machines, The Rudiments, F.Y.P, Link 80, Skankin' Pickle, Youth Brigade, No Use for a Name, Citizen Fish/Subhumans, and many other bands.

FOUR! ended in 1997 and Fraska started The Smiley Kids. After some touring the band recorded their first album, Still smilin' after all these years. The band was gaining momentum and was offered a record deal by several record labels. The band eventually decided on one of the labels and hit the studio to record their 2nd album, "Don't Get Bored". The band toured with many bands including Switchfoot, Five Iron Frenzy, Ghoti Hook, The Blamed, and many others (see 5 Minute Walk).

In 2002, a couple years after the Smiley Kids ended, Fraska along with his wife Misty on bass guitar, decided to start yet another project, The Scooterz, with some experimental songs he had previously recorded under the names Echo System and the Mad Haberdasher. The Scooterz was a new direction musically experimenting with and mixing punk, new wave, ska, surf, industrial, and many other different genres. Fraska is working on some new projects as well as re-releasing older out-of-print Red Ear Records releases, including some rare and unreleased recordings.

== Discography ==
Startled Calf

- "You Can't Change Me" – 1991
- "I Love Being Trendy" EP – 1991

Food Plaza/M.F.P.B.

- "Punk Soccer" – 1994

FOUR!

- "The Album" 1994
- "Play With Everything" – 1995
- "Are We Friends" 1996
- "Punk, It's All About The Orchis Factor." −1996 (Suburban Home Records)
- "Misfits of Ska II" −1997 (Asian Man Records)
- "Dillinquents (Red) Compilation" 1998 (Dill Records)

The Smiley Kids

- "2 Song Demo" – 1997
- "Still Smilin' After All These Years" – 1998
- "Don't Get Bored" – 1999
- "Skate and Smile Collection" – 2000

Echo System

- "Blasted Generation" '1999

The Scooterz

- "Square Pegs" (demo) – 2000
- "Corner of Depression" 2002
- "Robot Nation" 2007
- 5 Minute Walk
