= A Manual Dexterity: Soundtrack Volume One =

Soundtrack album by Omar Rodríguez-López
- Released: August 31, 2004
- Recorded: 2001 and some in 2004
- Studio: Doug Messenger's (Los Angeles, CA); E-Clat Morgue Portable Disaster Unit; Mad Dog Studios (Burbank, CA)
- Genre: Progressive rock Post-rock; Experimental
- Length: 52:52
- Label: Gold Standard Laboratories
- Producer: Omar Rodríguez-López

Omar Rodríguez-López solo chronology
A Manual Dexterity: Soundtrack Volume One (2004)	The Special 12 Singles Series (2005)

Omar Rodríguez-López chronology
Live (2003)	A Manual Dexterity: Soundtrack Volume One (2004)	Frances the Mute (2005)

Professional ratings
Review scores
Source	Rating
AllMusic	link
Pitchfork Media	(7.5/10) link

A Manual Dexterity: Soundtrack Volume One is the debut studio album by The Mars Volta guitarist Omar Rodríguez-López, mostly recorded in 2001 at Doug Messenger's Studio and Rodriguez-Lopez's mobile studio after the breakup of former band At the Drive-In. The record was finished at Mad Dog Studios in 2004 and released the same year. This was supposed to be the first volume of a two-part soundtrack set to go along to a film directed by Rodriguez-Lopez.

The release of Volume Two, which was originally planned for Spring of 2005, and the film itself were both delayed indefinitely due to legal problems. Conflicts over ownership of certain footage and Rodríguez-López's reluctance to revisit the project, which featured his late friend Jeremy Ward in the lead role, were both cited as reasons for the delay. However, Rodríguez-López stated that he does intend to release both Volume Two and the film at some point in the future.

"Deus Ex Machina" is a version of a song "Reina de Mi Vida", written by Omar's father Angel Marcelo Rodriguez-Chevrez (also known as Marcelo Rod-Che) for the famous Puerto Rican salsa orchestra El Gran Combo de Puerto Rico; here, it is performed by Angel Marcelo himself.

== Track listing ==
All tracks are written by Omar Rodríguez-López, unless noted.

No.	Title	Writer(s)	Length
1.	"Around Knuckle White Tile"		7:16
2.	"Dyna Sark Arches"		4:38
3.	"Here the Tame Go By"		5:11
4.	"Deus Ex Machina"	Rodríguez-López, Angel Marcelo Rodriguez	5:03
5.	"Dramatic Theme"		7:16
6.	"A Dressing Failure"		2:54
7.	"Sensory Decay Part II"		6:04
8.	"Of Blood Blue Blisters"		4:53
9.	"Dream Sequence"		6:11
10.	"The Palpitations Form a Limit"	Rodríguez-López, Cedric Bixler-Zavala	3:22
Total length:			52:52

== Personnel ==
Musicians

- Omar Rodríguez-López – guitars, bass, percussion, hand claps, roland promars, SH-1000, SH-101, SH-7, SH-2000, VP-330, Korg MS-2000, microKORG, organ, drum machines, pianette, piano, Yamaha QY-100, rhythm sequence, samples, TVs, telephone, typewriter, breathing
- Blake Fleming – drums (1, 2, 5, 8, 10), hand claps (2)
- Jeremy Ward – melodica (2), guitar pedals (5), yelling (8)
- John Frusciante – mini moog (2, 3), A 100 (3), guitars (5, 10)
- Cedric Bixler-Zavala – percussion & hand claps (2), vocals & lyrics (10)
- Angel Marcelo Rodriguez – vocals & lyrics (4)
- David Lopez – trumpet (4)
- Cecilio Ortiz – guitar (4)
- Alberto El Profesor Aragonez – percussion (4)
- Isaiah Ikey Owens – piano (8)
- Andrew Scheps – trumpet (8)
- Sara Christina Gross – saxophone (9)

Production

- Omar Rodríguez-López – production, engineering
- Alex Newport – engineering
- Jon Debaun – engineering
- Andrew Scheps – mixing
- Mark Chalecki – mastering

Artwork

- Omar Rodríguez-López – photos
- Sonny Kay – layout
