= Adrián Terrazas-González =

Mexican musician (born 1975)

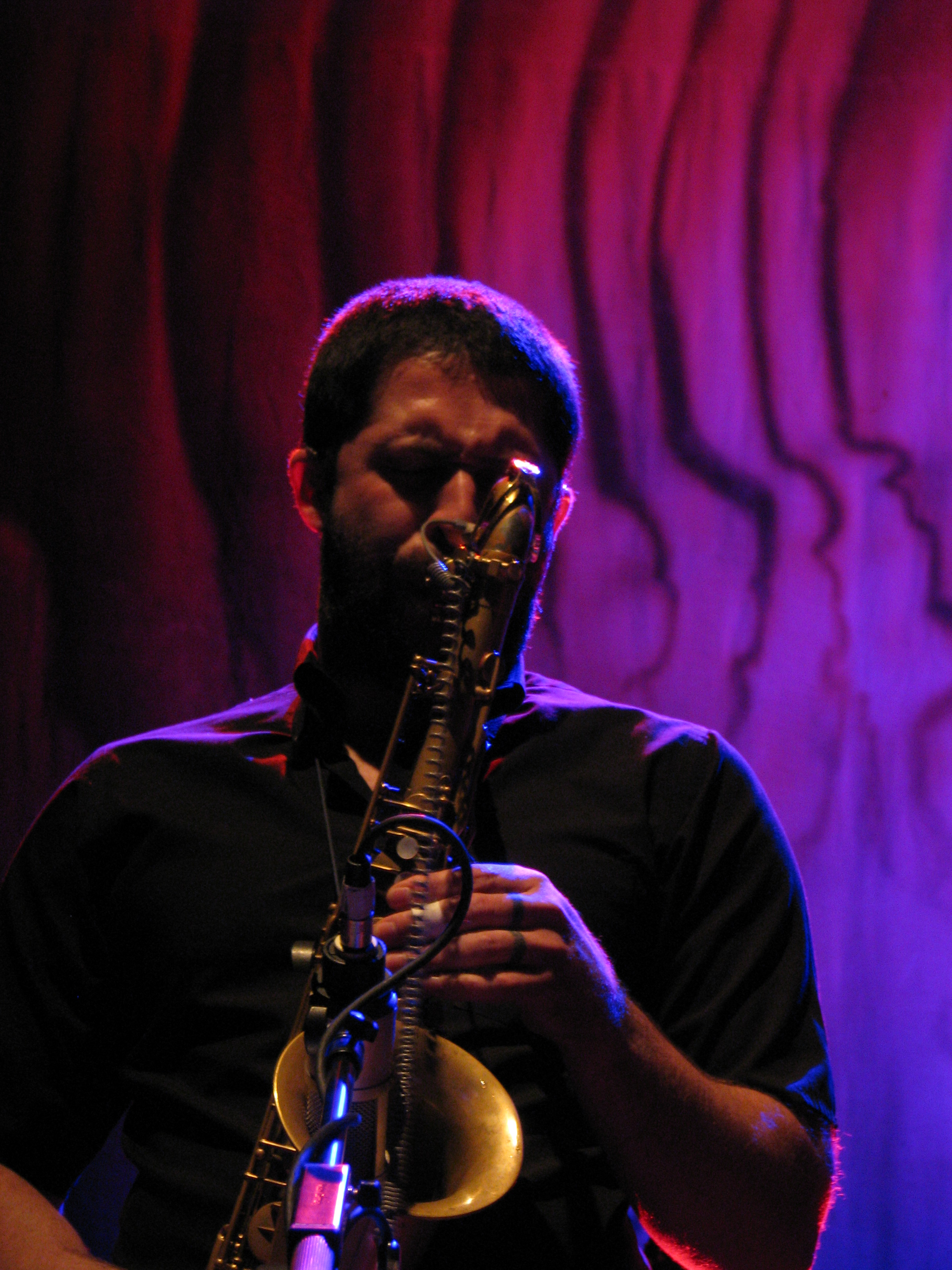
- Terrazas-González in 2008

Background information
- Born: Adrián Terrazas González; October 17, 1975 (age 50); Chihuahua, Mexico
- Genres: Latin rock, progressive rock, psychedelic rock, classical rock, experimental rock
- Occupation: Musician
- Instruments: Flute, saxophone, clarinet, percussion
- Years active: 1996–present
- Labels: Universal, Sumerian

Adrián Terrazas-González (born October 17, 1975) is a Mexican multi-instrumentalist who plays flute, tenor saxophone, bass clarinet, and percussion. Raised in Chihuahua, Chihuahua, México, Terrazas-González was influenced by Central American traditional music at an early age. He was a member of the progressive rock band The Mars Volta from 2005 to 2008 and the jazz group T.R.A.M.

== Discography ==
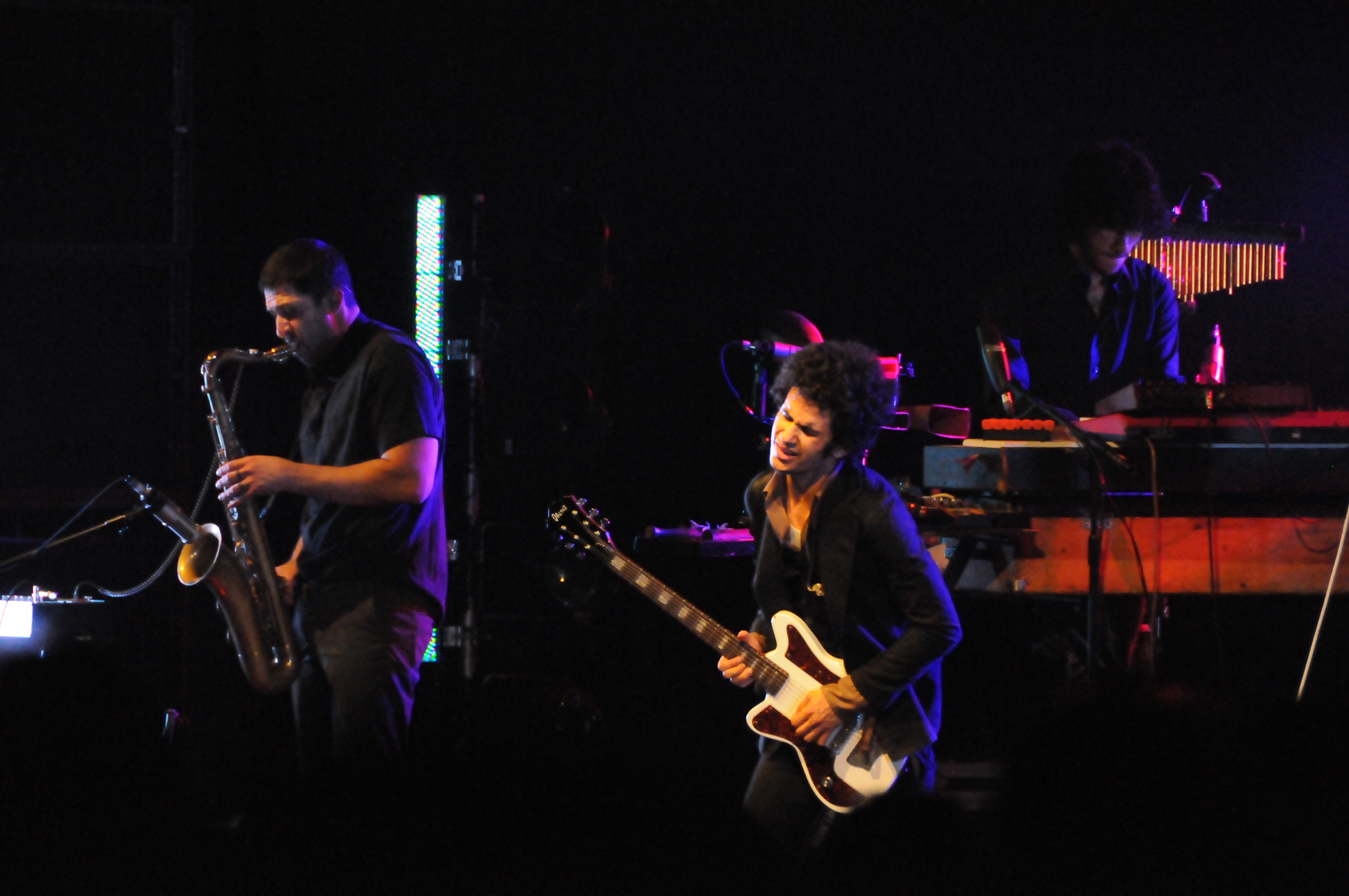
Terrazas-González, left, in 2008 with The Mars Volta

=== As leader ===
- Cu Taan (2009)

With The Mars Volta

- Frances The Mute (2005)
- Scabdates (2005)
- Amputechture (2006)
- The Bedlam in Goliath (2008)
- La Realidad De Los Sueños (2021)

With Omar Rodríguez-López

- Omar Rodriguez (2005)
- Please Heat This Eventually (2006)
- Se Dice Bisonte, No Búfalo (2007)
- Omar Rodriguez-Lopez & Lydia Lunch (2007)
- The Apocalypse Inside of An Orange (2007)
- Calibration (Is Pushing Luck and Key Too Far) (2007)
- Absence Makes the Heart Grow Fungus (2008)
- Old Money (2008)
- Woman Gives Birth To Tomato! (2013)
- Some Need It Lonely (2016)

With T.R.A.M.

- Lingua Franca (2012)

=== As sideman ===
With De Hombre A Hombre

- Hombres Valientes Alabanza Y Adoración En Vivo (1999)

With Juan Alderete

- Und Die Scheiße Ändert Sich Immer (2006) as Big Sir
- Halo Orbit (2016/2017)

With Zechs Marquise

- Our Delicate Stranded Nightmare (2008)

With Troker

- El Rey Del Camino (2010)

With Alex Otaola

- El Hombre de la Camara (2010)

With Trevor Hall

- Everything Everytime Everywhere (2011)

With The Memorials

- Delirium (2012)

With Candiria

- Not yet Reales (2013)
- While They Were Sleeping (2016)

With Secret Chiefs 3

- Book Of Souls: Folio A (2013)

With CECAM

- Xëëw (2013)

With Atomic Ape

- Swarm (2014)

With Cronomad

- Solve (2015)

With Breaking Fuel

- More More More (2015)
- Make Our Delay Great Again (2023)

With Avantist

- Avantist (2016)

With AJ Froman

- Indecorum (2017)

With Boyante

- A Rajatabla (2017)

With Schiermann

- Schiermann (2017)

With Tleikak

- Tleikak (2018)

With Mask of the Phantasm

- New Axial Age (2021)

With Lee McKinney

- In The Light Of Knowledge (2022)

With Arch Echo

- Final Pitch (2023)

With Wires

- The Golden Age (2023)

Guest appearances

- Gruis Spectra – Planeta B (2005)
- Tweaker – And Then There's Nothing (2013)
- The Greatness Design – Pillars Of Creation (2013)
- Random – Pidanoma (2014)
- URSS Bajo el Árbol – Líneas Mentales (2014)
- Run The Jewels – RTJ Cu4tro (2022)
- Zeta And The Abajo Cadenas Orchestra – Todo Bailarlo (2022)
- Arch Echo – Final Pitch (2023)
