= Solar Gambling =

Studio album by Omar Rodríguez-López
- Released: December 1, 2009
- Recorded: 2009
- Genres: Progressive rock, psychedelic rock, alternative rock
- Length: 34:14
- Label: Rodriguez Lopez Productions
- Producer: Omar Rodríguez-López

Omar Rodríguez-López solo chronology
Xenophanes (2009)	Solar Gambling (2009)	Ciencia de los Inútiles (2010)

Omar Rodríguez-López chronology
Octahedron (2009)	Solar Gambling (2009)	Sin Sin Sin (2011)

Solar Gambling is the thirteenth studio album by Omar Rodríguez-López as a solo artist. On December 1, 2009 the recording was released digitally via the Rodriguez Lopez Productions website along with a limited pressing of 1,500 colored vinyl (750 clear light yellow, 750 clear light blue). The limited pressings were distributed via the RLP website.

Professional ratings
Review scores
Source	Rating
Sputnik Music	(3.8/5)
rateyourmusic.com	3.5/5 stars
Beats Per Minute	(72/100)
Highly Evolved	4/5 stars

== Track listing ==
All tracks are written by Omar Rodríguez-López.

No.	Title	Length
1.	"Locomoción Capilar"	3:22
2.	"Las Flores Con Limón"	5:39
3.	"Colmillo Castrado"	2:27
4.	"Un Buitre Amable Me Pico"	3:08
5.	"Poincaré"	2:23
6.	"Los Tenáculos de la Libélula"	2:17
7.	"Miel del Ojo"	6:00
8.	"Lorentz"	3:36
9.	"Vasco de Gama"	5:22
Total length:		34:14

== Personnel ==
- Ximena Sariñana Rivera – vocals, lyrics
- Omar Rodríguez-López – guitars, bass, keys, piano
- Marcel Rodriguez-Lopez – synths, piano
- Deantoni Parks – drums (1,2,9)
- Oscar “Chucho” Perez – drums (4,7)

== Release history ==
Region	Date	Label	Format
Worldwide	December 1, 2009	Rodriguez Lopez Productions	Digital download
Worldwide	December 28, 2009	Rodriguez Lopez Productions	LP
United Kingdom	December 2023	Clouds Hill	LP
