= Old Money (album) =

Studio album by Omar Rodríguez-López
- Released: November 10, 2008
- Recorded: 2005–2006
- Genres: Experimental rock, progressive rock, psychedelic rock, funk rock
- Length: 45:25
- Label: Stones Throw Records
- Producer: Omar Rodríguez-López

Omar Rodríguez-López solo chronology
Minor Cuts and Scrapes in the Bushes Ahead (2008)	Old Money (2008)	Megaritual (2009)

Omar Rodríguez-López chronology
The Bedlam in Goliath (2008)	Old Money (2008)	Octahedron (2009)

Professional ratings
Review scores
Source	Rating
Allmusic	4.5/5 stars
CHARTattack	(favorable)
Drowned in Sound	(6/10)
The Skinny	3/5 stars
Paste	(75/100)
PopMatters	7/10 stars
Tiny Mix Tapes	4.5/5 stars

Old Money is the eighth studio album by American guitarist and composer Omar Rodríguez-López, his first with Stones Throw Records who released CD and MP3 versions on November 10, 2008, and a vinyl version in February 2009. Rodríguez-López explained that the album is "loosely based on the concept of exploitative industrialists and, well, their old money."

Rodriguez-Lopez has hinted that this record was a thematic sequel to the 2006 album Amputechture by his band The Mars Volta.

Review aggregate site Metacritic calculates a score of 70/100 for the album, but erroneously referred to it as "The debut album for the Mars Volta guitarist".

In the song "I Like Rockefellers' First Two Albums, But After That...", there is a dialog from the movie El Topo, from Chilean director Alejandro Jodorowsky.

== Track listing ==
All tracks are written by Omar Rodríguez-López.

No.	Title	Length
1.	"The Power of Myth"	5:29
2.	"How to Bill the Bilderberg Group"	3:27
3.	"Population Council's Wet Dream"	6:17
4.	"Private Fortunes"	4:12
5.	"Trilateral Commission as Dinner Guests"	4:51
6.	"1921"	1:35
7.	"Family War Funding (Love Those Rothschilds)"	3:55
8.	"Vipers in the Bosom"	1:49
9.	"I Like the Rockefellers' First Two Albums, But After That..."	4:31
10.	"Old Money"	9:18
Total length:		45:25

== Release history ==
Region	Date	Label	Format
United States	November 10, 2008	Stones Throw Records	MP3
United States	November 21, 2008	Stones Throw Records	CD
United Kingdom	January 26, 2009	Pinnacle	CD
United States	January 27, 2009	Stones Throw Records	CD (wide release)
United States	February 6, 2009	Stones Throw Records	LP
United Kingdom	December 2023	Clouds Hill	LP

== Personnel ==
- Omar Rodríguez-López – guitars (except 2), synths (except 6, 8), bass (2, 4, 5), keys (2, 4, 7, 10), Wurlitzer (2), theremin (3), effects and TV (6), percussion (8)
- Juan Alderete – bass (1, 3, 7, 9, 10)
- Adrian Terrazas-Gonzalez – woodwinds (5), percussion (7)
- Marcel Rodriguez-Lopez – percussion (1, 4, 7, 9, 10), drums (5, 9, 10), synths (1, 2, 4, 5, 7, 9, 10), clavinet and keys (10)
- Deantoni Parks – drums (1)
- Cedric Bixler-Zavala – drums (2)
- Jon Theodore – drums (3, 7)
