= Xenophanes (album) =

Studio album by Omar Rodríguez-López
- Released: September 28, 2009
- Recorded: December 2008
- Genre: Progressive rock, experimental rock, psychedelic rock, alternative rock
- Length: 44:53 (CD and digital editions); 41:58 (vinyl editions)
- Label: Rodriguez Lopez Productions
- Producer: Omar Rodríguez-López

Omar Rodríguez-López solo chronology
Los Sueños de un Hígado (2009)	Xenophanes (2009)	Solar Gambling (2009)

Omar Rodríguez-López chronology
Octahedron (2009)	Xenophanes (2009)	Sin Sin Sin (2011)

Professional ratings
Review scores
Source	Rating
AllMusic	3.5/5 stars
Pitchfork	5.7/10
The Skinny	4/5 stars

Xenophanes is the twelfth studio album by Omar Rodríguez-López as a solo artist. The same members of Omar Rodriguez-Lopez Group who toured Europe in March 2009 (and released Los Sueños de un Hígado around the same time) are featured on this record, created a few months beforehand. On September 28, 2009, the recording was released digitally via the Rodriguez-Lopez productions website as well as physically in Europe on both CD and yellow vinyl. The recording was released physically in the U.S. on November 10, 2009, on both CD and pink vinyl. A music video directed by Omar for "Asco Que Conmueve los Puntos Erógenos" was released on YouTube on November 30, 2009.

According to drummer Thomas Pridgen, while he was recording for the album he was under the impression Xenophanes would be a Mars Volta album.

In the liner notes, Omar wrote:

"This album is dedicated to and exists in celebration of Cedric Bixler-Zavala and Ximena Sariñana Rivera who have always believed in me and pushed me to be my true self. Thank you."

Each track of the record, except for "Azoemia" & "Sangrando Detrás de los Ojos", appear in completely different versions on the 2017 album Ensayo de un Desaparecido.

== Concept ==
Quoting the Myspace blog: "A conceptual journey through life, death, and rebirth, the album tells the story of a selfish and judgmental female caseworker who falls in love with a male client, only for him to die soon thereafter. Over the course of eleven subsequent lifetimes, the woman experiences life from every conceivable vantage point as her soul evolves, thereby allowing the maturity and eventual letting-go of her ego which in turn enables the realization that the man was, and always has been, her father spirit. Suggesting the fractal and holographic nature of both consciousness and physical reality, the concepts embraced on Xenophanes will appear at least vaguely familiar to anyone with experience in the psychedelic and/or shamanic realms, concepts which Xenophanes himself was likely the first to express within the confines of Western philosophy."

== Track listing ==
All tracks are written by Omar Rodríguez-López.

No.	Title	Length
1.	"Azoemia" (this track is omitted from both of the vinyl editions of the album)	2:49
2.	"Mundo de Ciegos"	4:00
3.	"Ojo al Cristo de Plata"	7:06
4.	"Amanita Virosa"	3:15
5.	"Sangrando Detrás de los Ojos"	2:03
6.	"Desarraigo"	5:54
7.	"Asco Que Conmueve los Puntos Erógenos"	4:06
8.	"Oremos"	4:48
9.	"Perder el Arte de la Razón sin Mover un Sólo Dedo"	3:30
10.	"A) Flores de Cizaña"	3:45
11.	"B) Maria Celeste"	3:31

== Personnel ==
- Omar Rodríguez-López – lead vocals, guitars, producer
- Ximena Sariñana – vocals
- Juan Alderete de la Peña – bass guitar
- Thomas Pridgen – drums
- Marcel Rodriguez-Lopez – synthesizers, piano, percussion
- Mark Aanderud – additional keyboards

== Release history ==
Region	Date	Label	Format
Various	September 28, 2009	Rodriguez-Lopez Productions	Digital download
Europe	September 28, 2009	Rodriguez-Lopez Productions	CD/yellow LP
United States	November 10, 2009	Rodriguez-Lopez Productions	CD/pink LP
United Kingdom	December 2023	Clouds Hill	black LP
