= Se Dice Bisonte, No Búfalo =

Studio album by Omar Rodríguez-López
- Released: May 29, 2007
- Recorded: November 2005
- Studio: Wisseloord Studios (Amsterdam); E-Clat Morgue Portable Disaster Unit; SST Records (Long Beach)
- Genre: Jazz fusion, experimental
- Length: 44:59; 68:48 (Bonus Disc)
- Label: Gold Standard Laboratories
- Producer: Omar Rodríguez-López

Omar Rodríguez-López solo chronology
Please Heat This Eventually (2006)	Se Dice Bisonte No Bùfalo (2007)	Omar Rodriguez Lopez & Lydia Lunch (2007)

Omar Rodríguez-López chronology
Amputechture (2006)	Se Dice Bisonte No Bùfalo (2007)	The Bedlam in Goliath (2008)

LP cover

Professional ratings
Review scores
Source	Rating
Allmusic	link
For the Sound	link
Kerrang!	3/5 stars

Se Dice Bisonte, No Búfalo (It's Called Bison, Not Buffalo) is the third studio album by Omar Rodríguez-López and the second in the "Amsterdam series". It was written and recorded in 2005 in California and Amsterdam, and was released May 29, 2007, by Gold Standard Labs on both vinyl and CD. A limited edition, brown marble vinyl was also available. 750 were made to fulfill pre-orders through April 30.

== Production ==
It is one of six albums written and recorded by Omar Rodríguez-López whilst living in Amsterdam in November 2005. Se Dice Bisonte, No Búfalo was conceived simultaneously to The Mars Volta's Amputechture and Omar's soundtrack to the Jorge Hernández Aldana film, El Búfalo de la Noche, which is where the title for the album originates. In the album's liner notes, Omar expressed that this record is a response and expression of his feelings of the film, the soundtrack of which will feature The Mars Volta contributions. The album artwork is provided by longtime collaborator Damon Locks of The Eternals.

== Content ==
Se Dice Bisonte, No Búfalo consists of 3 vocal tracks and 7 instrumentals, and includes an alternate version of the song Please Heat This Eventually (without the vocals of Damo Suzuki) recorded live at a concert in Kortrijk, Belgium. Omar performed the majority of the compositions solo, although the album also includes performances by The Mars Volta members Cedric Bixler-Zavala, Marcel Rodriguez-Lopez, Juan Alderete and Adrián Terrazas-González. It also features cameos by Money Mark, John Frusciante, and former Mars Volta drummer Jon Theodore who appears on the final track, which was recorded while he was still a part of the group.

"Rapid Fire Tollbooth" eventually became a part of The Mars Volta's live set, and evolved into the song "Goliath" which appears on their studio album The Bedlam in Goliath.

"Lurking About In A Cold Sweat (Held Together by Venom)" contains a chord progression similar to an unreleased song recorded by The Mars Volta during the Noctourniquet sessions, as well as a few instrumental jams, as part of the leaked 2013 compilation, dubbed The Ramrod Tapes. Fans refer to the song as "Clouds," "Orchestrina," or "Clouds/Orchestrina." Its official name was In the Vulpine Clouds.

== Sales ==
Se Dice Bisonte, No Búfalo is Omar's first solo album to chart on a Billboard music chart, peaking at #40 on the Top Heatseekers chart.

== Track listing ==
All tracks are written by Omar Rodríguez-López, unless noted.

No.	Title	Writer(s)	Length
1.	"The Lukewarm"		0:26
2.	"Luxury of Infancy"		1:12
3.	"Rapid Fire Tollbooth"	Omar Rodríguez-López, Cedric Bixler-Zavala	5:03
4.	"Thermometer Drinking the Business of Turnstiles"		3:00
5.	"Se Dice Bisonte, No Búfalo"	Rodríguez-López, Bixler-Zavala	7:00
6.	"If Gravity Lulls, I Can Hear the World Pant"		2:45
7.	"Please Heat This Eventually"		11:24
8.	"Lurking About in a Cold Sweat (Held Together by Venom)"		4:49
9.	"Boiling Death Request a Body to Rest Its Head On"		4:14
10.	"La Tiranía de la Tradición"	Rodríguez-López, Bixler-Zavala	5:05
Total length:			44:59

Bonus Disc (Japan Version)
No.	Title	Length
11.	"Please Heat This Eventually" (feat. Damo Suzuki)	24:49
Total length:		68:48

== Personnel ==
- Omar Rodríguez-López – guitars, bass (1–4, 5, 8, 10), drums (1), vocals (1), wurlitzer (4, 8), synths (4, 8–10), rhodes (8), Piano (10)
- Adrián Terrazas-González – woodwinds & percussion (3, 5–7, 9), Soprano (9)
- Marcel Rodriguez-Lopez – drums & percussion (3, 5–9), synths (7, 9), clavinet (8)
- Juan Alderete – bass (3, 5, 7, 9)
- Money Mark – keyboards (3), piano (5), organ, clavinet, synths (7)
- Cedric Bixler-Zavala – vocals & lyrics (3, 5, 10)
- John Frusciante – guitars (6)
- Jon Debaun – voice (9)
- Jon Theodore – drums (10)

Production

- Omar Rodríguez-López – production, engineering
- Jon Debaun - engineering
- Robert Carranza - mixing
- Pete Lyman - mastering
