= Antemasque (band) =

American rock band (2014–2015)

- Genres: Alternative rock; power pop; punk rock; post-hardcore
- Years active: 2014–2015
- Label: Nadie Sound
- Past members: Omar Rodríguez-López; Cedric Bixler-Zavala; Marfred Rodríguez-López; Travis Barker; Dave Elitch; Flea (studio only)

Antemasque was an American rock supergroup formed in 2014 by Omar Rodríguez-López and Cedric Bixler-Zavala, former members of At the Drive-In and The Mars Volta. Their first album featured Red Hot Chili Peppers's Flea on bass and Dave Elitch on drums. Both Flea and Elitch had previously played with The Mars Volta. Omar's brother Marfred Rodríguez-López (formerly of Zechs Marquise) eventually joined as a permanent bassist with Blink-182 member Travis Barker taking over drumming duties.

== History ==
On April 9, 2014 Bixler-Zavala and Rodríguez-López announced their new project, accompanying the announcement with the release of their first single "4AM", described by Rolling Stone as "a charging, punkish rocker with the sorts of squiggly noodling that both the Mars Volta guys and Flea have used as calling cards in their respective groups." Over the course of the next week, three more singles were released, and their self-titled debut album was released on November 10, 2014. Although Flea provided the bass for the album, he was not a member of the group and only provided the band his recording studio.

On November 2, 2015, the band debuted eight new songs from an upcoming release, titled Saddle on the Atom Bomb. However, as of 2025 the album has not been released, and there has been no further information on the band's social media platforms since 2015 implying that the band is no longer active.

== Band members ==
- Omar Rodríguez-López - guitar (2014–2015)
- Cedric Bixler-Zavala - vocals (2014–2015)
- Flea - bass (2014, studio only)
- Marfred Rodríguez-López - bass (2014–2015)
- David Elitch - drums (2014–2015)
- Travis Barker - drums (2015)

== Discography ==
Studio albums

- Antemasque (2014)
- Saddle on the Atom Bomb (unreleased)
