= Antemasque (album) =

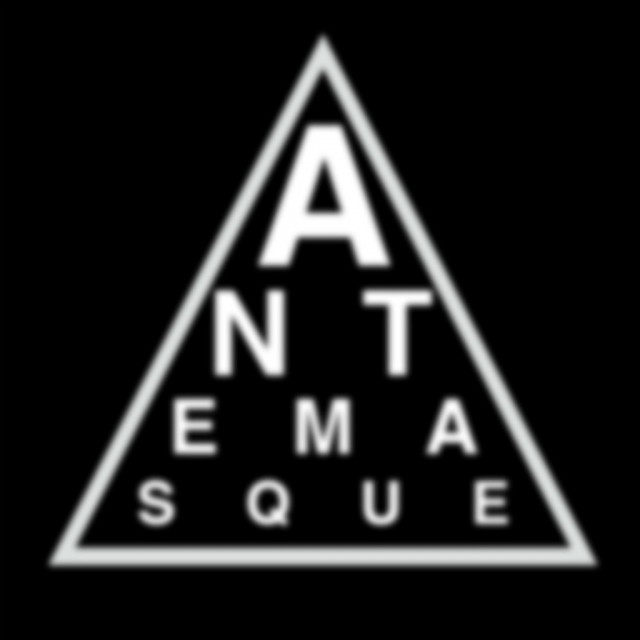

Studio album by Antemasque
- Released: July 1, 2014
- Recorded: 2014
- Length: 34:32 (40:18 deluxe edition)
- Label: Nadie Sound

Omar Rodríguez-López chronology
Cry Is for the Flies (2014)	Antemasque (2014)	Sworn Virgins (2016)

Singles from Antemasque
- 1. "4AM" Released: April 8, 2014; 2. "Hangin in the Lurch" Released: April 9, 2014; 3. "People Forget" Released: April 10, 2014; 4. "Drown All Your Witches" Released: April 11, 2014

Professional ratings
Aggregate scores
Source	Rating
Metacritic	67/100
Review scores
Source	Rating
Consequence of Sound	C
Exclaim!	(6/10)
The Guardian	3/5 stars
NME	4/5 stars
Punknews.org	4/5 stars

Antemasque is the only studio album by American band Antemasque, released as a limited digital release on July 1, 2014, and a wide release on November 10, 2014.

== Recording ==
Antemasque was recorded at The Boat in Silverlake, California. The studio, formerly owned by The Dust Brothers, is currently owned and operated by Flea.

== Release ==
On April 9, 2014, Antemasque released the album's first single "4AM". Rolling Stone described the song as "a charging, punkish rocker with the sorts of squiggly noodling that both the Mars Volta guys and Flea have used as calling cards in their respective groups." The next day, the band released a second song, "Hangin in the Lurch," on their bandcamp page, which is described as a mix of progressive rock and punk rock. The song's description mentioned that it would be released on an upcoming self-titled album. Their third single, "People Forget," was released on April 11, 2014. On April 15, the band released their fourth single, "Drown All Your Witches."

== Critical reception ==
NME wrote that "'I Got No Remorse' and 'Momento Mori' are both urgent, punk-inspired blasts of rock'n'roll, while the jangly romanticism of '50,000 Kilowatts' is surely the most sentimental song [Bixler-Zavala and Rodriguez-Lopez have] ever written – and one of the best."

== Track listing ==
All lyrics are written by Cedric Bixler-Zavala; all music is composed by Antemasque.

No.	Title	Length
1.	"4AM"	2:56
2.	"I Got No Remorse"	3:05
3.	"Ride Like the Devil's Son"	3:00
4.	"In the Lurch"	3:06
5.	"50,000 Kilowatts"	2:54
6.	"Momento Mori"	3:35
7.	"Drown All Your Witches"	3:31
8.	"Providence"	4:47
9.	"People Forget"	3:54
10.	"Rome Armed to the Teeth"	3:43
11.	"Hung in Effigy" (Japanese Bonus Track)	1:53
12.	"Domino Rain" (Japanese Bonus Track)	3:53
Total length:		40:18

== Personnel ==
- Antemasque:
  - Cedric Bixler Zavala – vocals
  - Omar Rodríguez-López – guitars, keyboards, production
  - David Elitch – drums
  - Flea – bass
- Jonathan Debaun – engineering
- Matt Bittman – mixing
- Chris Common – mastering
- Sonny Kay – album art
- Jason Farrell – layout
