= Sonny Kay =

American musician

Sonny Kay is a visual artist and musician.

== Biography ==
Kay was born in London, England on March 13, 1972, and raised in various locations including the UK, Barcelona, Spain, and Johannesburg, South Africa. His family relocated first to Los Angeles in 1979, and then to Colorado in 1987. He is the son of spaghetti Western film director Gilbert Lee Kay (a.k.a. José Briz).

In 1993, Kay founded the cult independent record label Gold Standard Laboratories, known also as GSL, while attending the University of Colorado at Boulder. During that time he was a member of the pre-screamo band Angel Hair (Gravity Records). In 1996, Kay (and GSL) relocated to Berkeley, California. By this time, he was vocalist with the influential "proto-futuristic" punk band, The VSS. Kay founded the independent music distributor Bottlenekk Distribution in 1996, which resulted in a rapid acceleration in releases and notoriety for GSL. The label soon became synonymous with bands such as The Locust, !!!, and The Mars Volta. Kay moved to San Diego in 2001 and to Los Angeles in 2003. Between 2003 and 2006 he was vocalist for the punk band Year Future.

After GSL ceased operations in October 2007, Kay began devoting his time to making art and graphic design. From 2008 until 2013 he was creative director of Rodriguez Lopez Productions, a record label dedicated to releasing the works of guitarist Omar Rodríguez-López and various other artists related to The Mars Volta, as well as its "parent" company, Sargent House. Kay's digital collage illustrations and/or graphic design have appeared on album sleeves for artists including Omar Rodríguez-López (for whom he designed over 25 albums), The Mars Volta, RX Bandits, The Locust, Zu, Shooter Jennings, Le Butcherettes, The Glitch Mob, Red Sparowes, And So I Watch You From Afar, Thavius Beck, The Drowning Men, Sun Ra, Bosnian Rainbows, 311 and others. In November 2010, Kay and painter Jeff Jordan presented a joint show of their work in Los Angeles, entitled Parallel Universes.

Kay was also a member of the bands Savalas (1991–1992), Subpoena the Past (1997–1999), and Optional Body (2008). He is credited with backing vocals on early releases by the San Diego grindcore band, Cattle Decapitation.

In 2007, Kay appeared in the feature film, The Sentimental Engine Slayer, written and directed by Omar Rodriguez Lopez. Kay's IMDB page also credits him with production design and title design for the film.

In 2017, Kay's first book, Headspaces: Surrealistic Album Art & Collage by Sonny Kay was published by Bob Rob Medina's Robot Enemy Publications.
