= Crystal Fairy (album) =

Studio album by Crystal Fairy
- Released: February 24, 2017
- Recorded: 2016
- Genre: Alternative rock, stoner rock, sludge metal
- Length: 40:15
- Label: Ipecac Recordings

Singles from Crystal Fairy
- 1. "Necklace of Divorce / Drugs on the Bus" Released: October 21, 2016; 2. "Chiseler" Released: December 9, 2016; 3. "Crystal Fairy" Released: January 23, 2017

Crystal Fairy is the eponymous debut album by the rock supergroup Crystal Fairy, released on February 24, 2017 via Ipecac Recordings.

== Recording ==
The album was reportedly written and recorded in a week, with a fluid and spontaneous process. Osborne and Crover would be in one room working on riffs. Rodríguez-López would be in another working on bass lines, and Suárez would be in another, creating lyrics for demos that had just been tracked. She abandoned her usual, deliberate writing technique in favour of improvisation: "the songs wrote and interpreted themselves."

== Lyrics and themes ==
Drugs are a recurring theme on the record.

The title track (and the name of the band itself) is a likely reference to the 2013 Chilean film Crystal Fairy & the Magical Cactus.

== Reception ==
Professional ratings
Aggregate scores
Source	Rating
Metacritic	80/100
Review scores
Source	Rating
AllMusic	4/5 stars
Consequence of Sound	B

Crystal Fairy received generally favorable reviews.

AllMusic's James Christopher Monger praised the album as "impressive stuff, and that it feels like the work of a much more seasoned crew of bandmates suggests that they had as much fun making it as the listener will have devouring it".

Consequence of Sound's Meghan Roos summarized it as "a heavy, artsy, and dramatic record that offers more with each listen".

== Track listing ==
All music and lyrics written by Crystal Fairy, except where noted.

No.	Title	Length
1.	"Chiseler"	3:00
2.	"Drugs on the Bus"	4:34
3.	"Necklace of Divorce"	4:19
4.	"Moth Tongue"	4:57
5.	"Crystal Fairy"	3:59
6.	"Secret Agent Rat"	3:21
7.	"Under Trouble"	5:12
8.	"Bent Teeth"	3:52
9.	"Posesión" (Pat Stratford, Lyon Wong, Steve Hunt, Geoff Magner, Mike Hunter)	2:20
10.	"Sweet Self"	2:22
11.	"Vampire X-Mas"	2:19
Total length:		40:15

== Personnel ==
Crystal Fairy

- Teri Gender Bender – lead vocals, guitar, keyboards
- Buzz Osborne – guitar, vocals
- Dale Crover – drums, guitar
- Omar Rodríguez-López – bass, guitar

Technical

- Chris Common – recording, mixing, mastering
- Toshi Kasai – recording
- Mackie Osborne – artwork design
