= The Mars Volta discography =

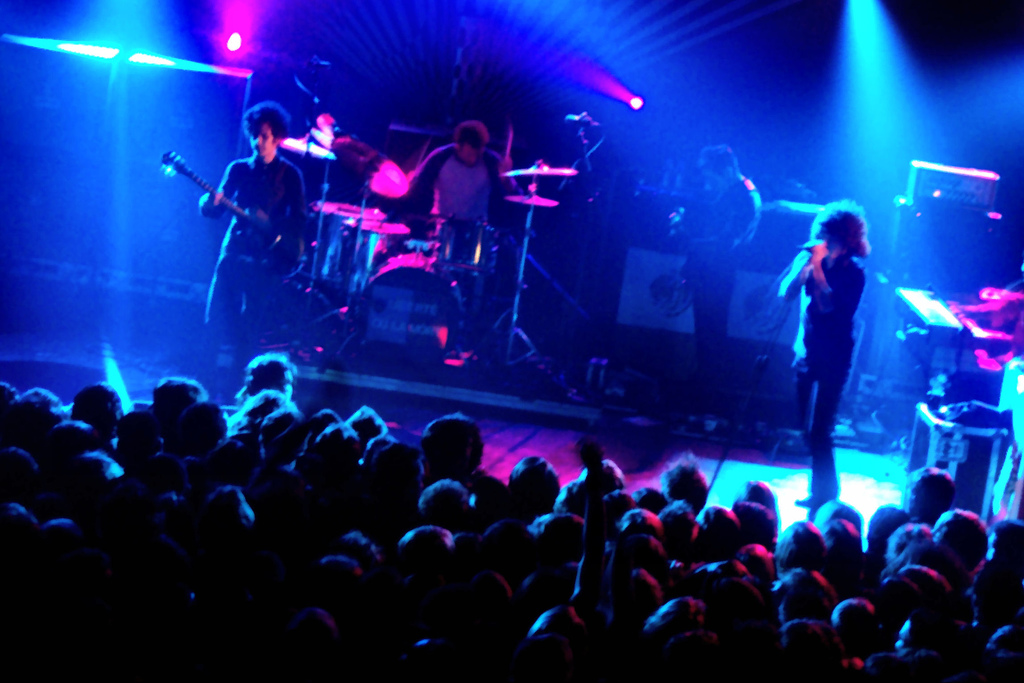
- The Mars Volta live at Carling Academy Birmingham
- Studio albums: 9
- Extended plays: 2
- Demo albums: 1
- Live albums: 2
- Singles: 19
- Music videos: 16
- Box set albums: 1

The discography of The Mars Volta, an American progressive rock group formed in 2001, consists of nine studio albums, two live albums, one demo album, two extended plays, and nineteen singles.

The band's first studio album De-Loused in the Comatorium was released in 2003 after a European tour supporting the Red Hot Chili Peppers. This concept album was produced by Rick Rubin and is based on the death of El Paso, Texas artist Julio Venegas, who committed suicide in 1996. In early 2005, the band released their second full-length album, Frances the Mute, a concept album based on the story of band associate Jeremy Ward, who died of an apparent heroin overdose in 2003. The album sold over 100,000 copies within the first week of release, and debuted at number four on the Billboard 200. The first single released from the album was "The Widow", which peaked at number 20 on the UK Singles Chart and became the band's only entry on the Billboard Hot 100 at number 95. The live album Scabdates, was released later the same year. Their third studio album Amputechture was released in 2006 and debuted at number 9 on the Billboard 200 selling over 59,000 copies in its opening week. The Bedlam in Goliath, the Mars Volta's fourth studio album, was released 2008 and debuted at a career-best number 3 on the Billboard 200. On June 23, 2009, the Mars Volta released Octahedron, which is the band's first album through Warner Bros. Records. The album spawned two singles, "Cotopaxi" and "Since We've Been Wrong". Recording for their next album, Noctourniquet, began shortly after, though the album wasn't completed and released until March 2012. In August 2013, a group of fifteen demos and unreleased songs, dubbed The Ramrod Tapes, were leaked online. After a ten-year hiatus, the band released their self-titled seventh album on September 16, 2022. An acoustic version of this album was released in 2023. Lucro Sucio; Los Ojos del Vacío, released on April 11, 2025, is the band's latest studio album to date. A live version of the record will be released on September 4, 2026.

== Albums ==
=== Studio albums ===
Title	Album details	Peak chart positions										Certifications (sales thresholds)
Title	Album details	US	AUS	BEL	FIN	NLD	NOR	NZL	SWE	SWI	UK	Certifications (sales thresholds)
De-Loused in the Comatorium	Released: June 24, 2003; Label: Universal, GSL; Format: CD, LP	39	47	—	—	74	—	—	—	—	43	BPI: Silver; MC: Gold
Frances the Mute	Released: March 1, 2005; Label: Universal, GSL; Format: CD, LP	4	9	13	14	34	1	21	12	81	23	RIAA: Gold
Amputechture	Released: September 12, 2006; Label: Universal, GSL; Format: CD, LP	9	6	39	18	54	12	16	27	88	49	
The Bedlam in Goliath	Released: January 29, 2008; Label: Universal; Format: CD, LP, USB	3	3	35	9	42	10	13	32	57	42	
Octahedron	Released: June 23, 2009; Label: Warner Bros.; Format: CD, LP	12	41	78	27	27	20	33	51	54	64	
Noctourniquet	Released: March 27, 2012; Label: Warner Bros.; Format: CD, LP	15	18	90	23	61	34	25	—	47	51	
The Mars Volta	Released: September 16, 2022; Label: Clouds Hill; Format: CD, LP, digital	83	86	142	—	—	—	—	—	42	—	
Que Dios Te Maldiga Mi Corazón	Released: April 21, 2023; Label: Clouds Hill; Format: CD, LP, digital	—	—	—	—	—	—	—	—	—	—	
Lucro Sucio; Los Ojos del Vacío	Released: April 11, 2025; Label: Clouds Hill; Format: CD, LP, digital	—	—	—	—	—	—	—	—	—	—	
"—" denotes a release that did not chart.

=== Live albums ===
Title	Album details	Peak chart positions			
Title	Album details	US	AUS	CAN	JPN
Scabdates	Released: November 8, 2005; Label: GSL (GSL #118), Strummer, Universal (B#0005644-02); Formats: CD, LP	76	87	89	141
Lucro Sucio; Unfinished Business	Released: November 20, 2026; Label: InsideOutMusic under exclusive license from Unfinished Business LLC; Formats: CD, LP, digital	To be released			
"—" denotes a release that did not chart.

=== Demo albums ===
Title	Album details
Landscape Tantrums	Released: April 23, 2021; Label: Clouds Hill; Formats: LP, digital

=== Unreleased material ===
List of unreleased material
Title	Album details
The Ramrod Tapes	Leaked: August 2013; Format: MP3 file

== Box sets ==
Title	Details
La Realidad De Los Sueños	Released: April 23, 2021; Label: Clouds Hill (CH #180); Formats: LP

== Extended plays ==
Title	EP details
Tremulant	Released: April 2, 2002; Label: GSL (GSL #54); Formats: CD, LP
Live	Released: 2003; Label: GSL, Strummer, Universal; Format: CD

== Singles ==
Title	Year	Peak chart positions					Album
Title	Year	US	US Alt.	US Main.	AUS	UK	Album
"Inertiatic ESP"	2003	—	—	—	—	42	De-Loused in the Comatorium
"Televators"	2004	—	—	—	64	41	De-Loused in the Comatorium
"The Widow"	2005	95	7	25	—	20	Frances the Mute
"L'Via L'Viaquez"	2005	—	—	—	—	53	Frances the Mute
"Viscera Eyes"	2006	—	—	—	—	—	Amputechture
"Wax Simulacra"	2007	—	—	—	—	—	The Bedlam in Goliath
"Goliath"	2008	—	—	—	—	—	The Bedlam in Goliath
"Cotopaxi"	2009	—	—	—	—	—	Octahedron
"Since We've Been Wrong"	2009	—	—	—	—	—	Octahedron
"The Malkin Jewel"	2012	—	—	—	—	—	Noctourniquet
"Blacklight Shine"	2022	—	—	—	—	—	The Mars Volta
"Graveyard Love"	2022	—	—	—	—	—	The Mars Volta
"Vigil"	2022	—	—	—	—	—	The Mars Volta
"Blank Condolences" (acoustic)	2023	—	—	—	—	—	Que Dios Te Maldiga Mi Corazón
"Palm Full of Crux" (acoustic)	2023	—	—	—	—	—	Que Dios Te Maldiga Mi Corazón
"Cue the Sun / Alba Del Orate"	2026	—	—	—	—	—	Lucro Sucio; Unfinished Business
"Reina Tormenta / Enlazan Las Tinieblas"	2026	—	—	—	—	—	Lucro Sucio; Unfinished Business
"Voice In My Knives / Poseedora De Mi Sombra"	2026	—	—	—	—	—	Lucro Sucio; Unfinished Business
"The Iron Rose"	2026	—	—	—	—	—	Lucro Sucio; Unfinished Business
"—" denotes a release that did not chart.

== B-sides ==
=== Original material ===
Year	Song	Released on	Notes
2003	"Ambuletz"	De-Loused in the Comatorium	
2005	"Frances The Mute"	"Frances The Mute"	Appears on single, not the album
2005	"The Bible And The Breathalyzer"	"The Bible And The Breathalyzer / L'Via L'Viaquez"	Promotional single
2008	"Mr. Muggs"	The Bedlam in Goliath	Bonus 7" single released with vinyl edition of the album
2021	"A Plague Upon Your Hissing Children"	La Realidad De Los Sueños	An outtake of De-Loused in the Comatorium. Previously only available through bootlegged versions

=== Covers ===
Year	Song	Released on	Original artist
2008	"Back Up Against the Wall"	The Bedlam in Goliath	Circle Jerks
2008	"Birthday"	The Bedlam in Goliath	The Sugarcubes
2008	"Candy and a Currant Bun"	The Bedlam in Goliath	Pink Floyd
2008	"Pulled to Bits"	The Bedlam in Goliath	Siouxsie and the Banshees
2008	"Memories"	The Bedlam in Goliath	Soft Machine
2008	"Things Behind the Sun"	The Bedlam in Goliath	Nick Drake

=== Acoustic versions ===
Year	Song	Released on
2005	"The Widow"	Frances the Mute

=== Remixes ===
Year	Song	Released on	Taken from
2007	"Goliath (El P Remix)"	"Goliath" (3 Track EP)	The Bedlam in Goliath (2008)
2007	"Goliath (El P Remix Instrumental)"	"Goliath" (3 Track EP)	The Bedlam in Goliath (2008)
2007	"Tourniquet Man (Wes The Mes Remix)"	"Goliath" (3 Track EP)	The Bedlam in Goliath (2008)

=== Demos ===
Year	Song	Released on	Demo of
2003	"This Apparatus Must Be Unearthed (Rough 02)"	"Promo EP"	This Apparatus Must Be Unearthed
2003	"Drunkship Of Lanterns (Final Master 03)"	"Promo EP"	Drunkship Of Lanterns
2008	"GetMadRef"	The Bedlam in Goliath	Agadez
2008	"Ratiplet for Label"	The Bedlam in Goliath	Soothsayer
2021	"Eunuch Provocateur"	La Realidad De Los Sueños	Eunuch Provocateur (alternate recording)

=== Live versions ===
All live tracks released on De-Loused in the Comatorium were compiled into a live EP entitled Live.

Year	Song	Released on	Taken from	Notes
2003	"Roulette Dares (The Haunt Of)" (live XFM session)	De-Loused in the Comatorium		Released on Australian special edition bonus disc
2003	"Drunkship of Lanterns" (live XFM session)	De-Loused in the Comatorium		Released on Australian special edition bonus disc
2003	"Cicatriz ESP"	De-Loused in the Comatorium		Released on Australian special edition bonus disc
2003	"Televators"	De-Loused in the Comatorium		Released on Australian special edition bonus disc
2004	"Take The Veil Cerpin Taxt" (Live XFM Session)	Televators	De-Loused in the Comatorium	Released on single
2005	"Drunkship of Lanterns"	Live At The Electric Ballroom (DVD)	De-Loused in the Comatorium	DVD promo
2005	"Cicatriz ESP"	Live At The Electric Ballroom (DVD)	De-Loused in the Comatorium	DVD promo
2005	"Televators"	Live At The Electric Ballroom (DVD)	De-Loused in the Comatorium	DVD promo
2005	"Eriatarka"	Live At The Electric Ballroom	De-Loused in the Comatorium	CD promo
2005	"Take The Veil Cerpin Taxt"	Live At The Electric Ballroom	De-Loused in the Comatorium	CD promo
2005	"Roulette Dares (The Haunt Of) - Live At The Electric Ballroom"	"The Widow"	De-Loused in the Comatorium	Released on single
2005	"The Widow"	"Frances The Mute"	Frances the Mute	Released on single
2008	"Cygnus....Vismund Cygnus"	The Bedlam in Goliath	Frances the Mute	Best Buy live DVD
2009	"Cotopaxi"	Octahedron		iTunes pre-order bonus track
2012	"The Malkin Jewel"	Noctourniquet		Japanese bonus track

== Promo ==
Title	Year	Album
[Untitled] (The Apes / Les Savy Fav / The Mars Volta): Format: 3" CD	2002	Tremulant
"Promo EP": Format: CDr	2003	De-Loused in the Comatorium
"Inertiatic ESP": Format: CD, 12" vinyl, 10" vinyl	2003	De-Loused in the Comatorium
"This Apparatus Must Be Unearthed": Format: Compact Disc	2003	De-Loused in the Comatorium
"Televators": Format: CD, 12" vinyl, 10" vinyl	2003	De-Loused in the Comatorium
"The Widow": Format: CD, CDr, 12" vinyl, picture disc, digital	2004	Frances the Mute
"Live At The Electric Ballroom": Format: DVD, DVD-Video	2005	De-Loused in the Comatorium
"Live At The Electric Ballroom": Format: CD, CDr	2005	De-Loused in the Comatorium
"Frances The Mute": Format: CD, 12" vinyl	2005	Frances the Mute
"L'Via L'Viaquez": Format: CD, CDr, DVDr, DVD-Video, VHS	2005	Frances the Mute
"Oh My God / L'Via L'Viaquez": Format: VHS	2005	Frances the Mute
"The Bible And The Breathalyzer / L'Via L'Viaquez": Format: CD, 10" vinyl, picture disc	2005	Frances the Mute
"The Widow": Format: DVD, DVD-Video	2005	Frances the Mute
"Sampler": Format: CDr	2006	De-Loused in the Comatorium, Frances the Mute
"Viscera Eyes": Format: CD, CDr	2006	Amputechture
"Goliath": Format: CD, 12" vinyl	2007	The Bedlam in Goliath
"Wax Simulacra": Format: CD, 7" picture disc, AAC file	2007	The Bedlam in Goliath
"Candy And A Currant Bun": Format: VinylDisc	2008	The Bedlam in Goliath
"The Bedlam In Goliath (Exclusive Tracks)": Format 2 x WMA file	2008	The Bedlam in Goliath
"Select Tracks From 'Octahedron'": Format: CDr	2009	Octahedron
"Cotopaxi": Format: CD	2009	Octahedron
"Since We've Been Wrong": Format: CD	2009	Octahedron
"The Malkin Jewel": Format: CD, CDr	2012	Noctourniquet
"Inertiatic ESP (Unfinished Original Recordings Of De-Loused In The Comatorium)": Format: digital	2021	Landscape Tantrums
"Blacklight Shine": Format: digital	2022	The Mars Volta
"Graveyard Love": Format: digital	2022	The Mars Volta
"Vigil": Format: digital	2022	The Mars Volta
"Blank Condolences (Acoustic)": Format: digital	2023	Que Dios Te Maldiga Mi Corazón
"Palm Full Of Crux (Acoustic)": Format: digital	2023	Que Dios Te Maldiga Mi Corazón

== Videography ==
=== Films ===
Title	Year	Director
Coachella	2006	Drew Thomas
All Tomorrow's Parties	2009	All Tomorrow's People & Jonathan Caouette
Omar and Cedric: If This Ever Gets Weird	2023	Nicolas Jack Davies

=== Music videos ===
Title	Year	Director
"Son et Lumière/Inertiatic ESP"	2003	Omar Rodríguez-López
"Televators"	2004	The Saline Project
"The Widow"	2005	Jim Agnew & Simon Chan
"L'Via L'Viaquez"	2005	Omar Rodríguez-López
"Wax Simulacra"	2007	Jorge Hernandez
"Aberinkula"	2008	Omar Rodríguez-López
"Goliath"	2008	Omar Rodríguez-López
"Askepios"	2008	Omar Rodríguez-López
"Ilyena"	2008	Omar Rodríguez-López
"Cotopaxi"	2009	Omar Rodríguez-López
"Since We've Been Wrong"	2009	Omar Rodríguez-López
"The Malkin Jewel (Live)"	2012	Rubén Rodríguez & Omar Rodríguez-López
"Blacklight Shine"	2022	Omar Rodríguez-López
"Graveyard Love"	2022	Omar Rodríguez-López
"Vigil"	2022	Omar Rodríguez-López
"Flash Burns From Flashbacks"	2022	Omar Rodríguez-López

== See also ==
- At the Drive-In discography
- De Facto discography
- Omar Rodríguez-López discography
- Omar Rodríguez-López filmography
