= La Realidad De Los Sueños =

Box set by The Mars Volta
- Released: April 23, 2021
- Recorded: 2001–2011
- Genres: Progressive rock, experimental rock
- Label: Clouds Hill
- Producer: Omar Rodriguez-Lopez Rick Rubin

The Mars Volta chronology
The Ramrod Tapes (2013)	La Realidad De Los Sueños (2021)	Landscape Tantrums (2021)

La Realidad De Los Sueños (transl. The Reality of Dreams) is a box set by the progressive rock band The Mars Volta. Released more than nine years after the band's last official album, Noctourniquet, the box set anthology was an indication of the group's potential reunion after years of inactivity. Most of the band's discography up to that point, including unreleased material, is included and features contributions from current and former members of the group.

== Overview ==
The set includes eighteen LP vinyl records, a photo book of behind-the-scenes photography, credits insert, a poster, 3D glasses, and two pins. All of the band's then-current official discography, excluding Live and Scabdates, is included as well as a previously unreleased demo album of De-Loused in the Comatorium, titled Landscape Tantrums. This session was overseen solely by the band's guitarist Omar Rodríguez-López, who stated in an interview that the two-track references were bootlegged but that the mixes were preserved and stored in his vault for twenty years. It was also the first project that he and Jon DeBaun worked on together, according to the same interview. Furthermore, Rodríguez-López mentioned the difficulty in working with Universal Records to release the box set. He states, "[Universal] literally are not using the master that came from me, the one used for the original analogue pressing. They have the digital master, from which they made the CD and the digital releases." However, the included releases were eventually pressed from vinyl lacquers that were remastered by engineer Chris von Rautenkranz, who wanted to give the sound more space and to make it more livelier and organic.

Also included in La Realidad De Los Sueños are an unreleased song from the De-Loused in the Comatorium sessions titled "A Plague Upon Your Hissing Children" and a version of Eunuch Provocateur recorded in the same period. A Plague Upon Your Hissing Children had been bootlegged and circulating on the internet for years under slightly different names before being included in the box set. Such is the case for this version of Eunuch Provocateur and also Concertina which are tracks on their earliest release, Tremulant. These versions of the tracks were rerecorded during the De-Loused in the Comatorium sessions under Rick Rubin. While certain unreleased songs and B-sides like these and Mr. Muggs were included in the box set, the absence of others like Ambuletz and the rerecorded Concertina are especially intriguing. The name of the album likely refers to a lyric in Concertina, "la realidad de tu sueño," much in the same way Landscape Tantrums is taken from a lyric in Cut That City from the same inaugural release.

The box set itself is a rhombus-shaped encasing that pulls apart to reveal the LPs and photo book. It sits upon a carboard stand and features a series of dream-themed, surrealist collage artworks made from the band's previous releases. The LPs are pressed on black vinyl. The record label overseeing the box set's release, Clouds Hill, priced it at £320.00 GBP with a limited five-thousand copy release. It sold out in the U.S. well before its April 23, 2021 release date.

Regarding the box set, Rodríguez-López, stated in an interview: “It’s a snapshot, the only proof that I have that that person, now unrecognizable to me, once existed and did these things, had these experiences. It’s like finding a beautiful surprise package that becomes sentient and awakens us.” Moreover, lyricist and singer, Cedric Bixler-Zavala, referred to the anthology as a “time machine.”

== Reception ==
Professional ratings
Review scores
Source	Rating
RollingStone	4/5 stars
Flood Magazine	9/10
Louder Sound	4/5 stars
Kerrang!	4/5 stars

La Realidad De Los Sueños received generally favorable reviews. Rolling Stone described it as "some kind of trippy, seemingly bottomless treasure chest." They praise the box set's art, imagery, and overall music selection. Flood Magazine lauded the collection as both a "forward-back time machine of craft, multiculturalism, and innovation stuffed into an immense treasure chest/magician’s hat filled with a seemingly never-ending array of tricks and triumphs." The magazine compliments the production and the inclusion of previously-unreleased material.

Louder Sound plaudits Landscape Tantrums and, in general, describes the band's discography as "music as science, science as emotion, emotion as inspiration, put together by crazed geniuses with virtuoso skills." Kerrang! likewise touches upon all of these points while also claiming that The Mars Volta has created some of the "most genuinely progressive music in rock history."

== Track listing ==
Tremulant (Disc 1)
No.	Title	Length
1.	"Cut That City"	5:44
2.	"Concertina"	4:54
3.	"Eunuch Provocateur"	8:48

De-Loused in the Comatorium (Discs 2-3)
No.	Title	Length
1.	"Son Et Lumière"	1:35
2.	"Inertiatic ESP"	4:23
3.	"Roulette Dares (The Haunt Of)"	7:30
4.	"Tira Me A Las Arañas"	1:28
5.	"Drunkship Of Lanterns"	7:05
6.	"Eriatarka"	6:20
7.	"Cicatriz ESP"	12:28
8.	"This Apparatus Must Be Unearthed"	4:57
9.	"Televators"	6:18
10.	"Take The Veil Cerpin Taxt"	8:41

Frances the Mute (Discs 4-6)
No.	Title	Length
1.	"Cygnus....Vismund Cygnus"	13:02
2.	"The Widow"	5:50
3.	"L’Via L’Viaquez"	12:21
4.	"Miranda That Ghost Just Isn’t Holy Anymore"	13:48
5.	"Cassandra Gemini (Part 1)"	14:52
6.	"Cassandra Gemini (Part 2)"	17:39

- Track 1 is divided into parts a, Sarcophagi; b, Umbilical Syllables; c, Facillis Dascenus Averni; d, Con Safo
- Track 4 is divided into parts a, Vade Mecum; b, Pour Another Icepick; c, Pisacis (Phra-Men-Ma); d, Con Safo
- Track 5 is divided into parts a, Tarantism; b, Plant A Nail In The Navel Stream; c, Famine Pulse
- Track 6 is divided into parts a, Famine Pulse; b, Multiple Spouse Wounds; c, Sarcophagi

Amputechture (Discs 7-8)
No.	Title	Length
1.	"Vicarious Atonement"	7:19
2.	"Tetragrammaton"	16:41
3.	"Vermicide"	4:16
4.	"Meccamputechture"	11:03
5.	"Asilos Magdalena"	6:34
6.	"Viscera Eyes"	9:23
7.	"Day Of The Baphomets"	11:57
8.	"El Ciervo Vulnerado"	8:50

The Bedlam in Goliath (Discs 9-10)
No.	Title	Length
1.	"Aberinkula"	5:45
2.	"Metatron"	8:12
3.	"Ilyena"	5:36
4.	"Wax Simulacra"	2:39
5.	"Goliath"	7:15
6.	"Tourniquet Man"	2:28
7.	"Cavalettas"	9:32
8.	"Agadez"	6:44
9.	"Askepios"	5:11
10.	"Ouroborous"	6:36
11.	"Soothsayer"	9:08
12.	"Conjugal Burns"	6:36

Mr. Muggs (Disc 11)
No.	Title	Length
1.	"Mr. Muggs"	3:15
2.	"Mr. Muggs"	3:15

Octahedron (Discs 12-13)
No.	Title	Length
1.	"Since We’ve Been Wrong"	7:22
2.	"Teflon"	5:06
3.	"Halo Of Nembutals"	5:32
4.	"With Twilight As My Guide"	7:54
5.	"Cotopaxi"	3:40
6.	"Desperate Graves"	4:58
7.	"Copernicus"	7:24
8.	"Luciforms"	8:22

Noctourniquet (Discs 14-15)
No.	Title	Length
1.	"The Whip Hand"	4:49
2.	"Aegis"	5:11
3.	"Dyslexicon"	4:22
4.	"Empty Vessels Make The Loudest Sound"	6:43
5.	"The Malkin Jewel"	4:44
6.	"Lapochka"	4:16
7.	"In Absentia"	7:26
8.	"Imago"	3:58
9.	"Molochwalker"	3:33
10.	"Trinkets Pale Of Moon"	4:25
11.	"Vedamalady"	3:54
12.	"Nocturniquet"	5:39
13.	"Zed And Two Naughts"	5:36

Landscape Tantrums (Original Unfinished Recordings Of De-Loused In The Comatorium) (Disc 16)
No.	Title	Length
1.	"Roulette Dares (The Haunt Of)"	6:38
2.	"Son Et Lumière"	2:18
3.	"Inertiatic ESP"	3:58
4.	"Drunkship Of Lanterns"	5:58
5.	"Eriatarka"	5:35
6.	"This Apparatus Must Be Unearthed"	4:38
7.	"Televators"	4:56
8.	"Take The Veil Cerpin Taxt"	12:32

Eunuch Provocateur (Disc 17)
No.	Title	Length
1.	"Eunuch Provocateur"	6:12

A Plague Upon Your Hissing Children (Disc 18)
No.	Title	Length
1.	"A Plague Upon Your Hissing Children"	4:41

== Notes ==
- Tremulant is housed in a single-pocket jacket and includes an insert with lyrics and credits
- De-Loused In The Comatorium is housed in a gatefold jacket and includes printed inner sleeves and a fold-out double sided poster
- Frances the Mute is housed in a triple gatefold jacket and includes printed inner sleeves. Last side is etched
- Amputechture is housed in a gatefold jacket
- The Bedlam In Goliath is housed in a gatefold jacket and includes printed inner sleeves. Jon Theodore is miscredited as a performer in the album credits
- Mr. Muggs, a B-side to The Bedlam in Goliath, is housed in a printed sleeve
- Octahedron is housed in a gatefold jacket with spot varnished art and includes printed inner sleeves
- Noctourniquet is housed in a single-pocket jacket and includes printed inner sleeves, a fold out poster with art, and a set of 3D glasses
- Landscape Tantrums, a demo album of De-Loused in the Comatorium, is housed in a numbered, printed sleeve
- Eunuch Provocateur, a rerecorded version overseen by Rick Rubin during the De-Loused in the Comatorium sessions, is housed in a single-pocket jacket. Second side is etched
- A Plague Upon Your Hissing Children, an outtake of De-Loused in the Comatorium that had previously been leaked online for years, is housed in a single-pocket jacket. Second side is etched
- The 36-page photobook contains photography by Danielle Van Ark and text by Stevie Chick
