= The Ramrod Tapes =

2013 unofficial album by The Mars Volta

Compilation album by the Mars Volta
- Released: August 19, 2013
- Recorded: 2001–2010
- Genre: Progressive rock
- Length: 80:31
- Label: Clouds Hill
- Producer: Omar Rodríguez-López

The Mars Volta chronology
Noctourniquet (2012)	The Ramrod Tapes (2013)	Landscape Tantrums (2021)

The Ramrod Tapes is an unofficial, leaked compilation of songs by The Mars Volta. The tracks surfaced on the fan forum, The Comatorium, in August 2013, and featured a collection of fifteen demos and outtakes. A user on the forum claimed to have received a private message containing the tracks with instructions to disseminate them online. Many of the songs would go on to be released on Omar Rodriguez-Lopez solo albums.

== Overview ==
In August 2013, months after The Mars Volta had officially been disbanded, a group of fifteen tracks appeared on the fan forum, The Comatorium. The songs range from rough demos and instrumental pieces to near-finished songs that didn't make it onto official releases. Such is the case with three of the tracks. Two of the tracks are instrumental demos of one of the as-of-yet unreleased songs. This piece, unofficially dubbed, "Clouds/Orchestrina," was played during a 2011 Omar Rodriguez-Lopez Group show. Part of the lyrics of another unreleased song, "k49", which was given the moniker "Whisper To Your Flinch," were sung by The Mars Volta in a jam during a 2008 show in Australia. Furthermore, another track is a demo of "Vicarious Atonement" from their previous album, Amputechture. A demo of "Molochwalker" from Noctourniquet also appears in the compilation. Lastly, four of the remaining eight tracks would appear on Omar Rodriguez-Lopez's 2016 album, Arañas en la Sombra, while the other four are demos of previously released Rodriguez-Lopez songs or songs that would subsequently go on to be officially released on other solo records in his discography.

"F39h" is compositionally similar to some elements of the extended, live version of "Trinkets Pale of Moon", first performed at shows in 2011. "F9h0" contains chord progressions similar to parts in "Take The Veil Cerpin Taxt."

"Qr5'" contains a percussion breakdown which was featured on an unreleased recording of "Roulette Dares (The Haunt Of)" from their 2003 debut album, De-Loused in the Comatorium. The instrumental also features a drum track from an outtake of De-Loused in the Comatorium titled "A Plague Upon Your Hissing Children." ",14"("Clouds/Orchestrina") contains a chord progression similar to "Lurking About In A Cold Sweat (Held Together by Venom)", an Omar Rodriguez-Lopez song released on the 2007 album Se Dice Bisonte, No Búfalo.

Because the tracks were recorded in various sessions many years apart, a number of former members of the band contributed to the songs. Thomas Pridgen, former drummer of the group, commented on Facebook about the collection of leaked demos, “im pretty sure the songs i loved playing on [2009’s] Octahedron that didnt make the record are on there and im excited.”

Regarding the leaked tracks, Cedric Bixler-Zavala, lead singer of The Mars Volta, jokingly stated, "The recent TMV leaks are from a session we did w/ @davidguetta during our residency at Ibiza hot spot RAMROD". Thus, the name, The Ramrod Tapes, was created by fans of the band. The tracks have also been bootlegged under the name "B-Sides."

== Reception ==
Heavy Pop Magazine described the leaked tracks positively, stating that the material is well-produced and can captivate the listener. They describe the tracks as comparable to Se Dice Bisonte, No Bùfalo and note the entertaining aspect of the material's experimentation. Bearded Gentlemen Music gave a positive review of the album, which they stated contains plenty of "gems." They praised ",14" for its melody and chorus and mention Thomas Pridgen's drumming on "98d97" as intriguing.

== Track listing ==
All tracks are written by Omar Rodríguez-López, except where noted.

No.	Title	Writer(s)	Length
1.	",14"	Cedric Bixler-Zavala; Omar Rodríguez-López	5:07
2.	"98d87"		4:18
3.	"cmv8"		3:07
4.	"dp"		6:05
5.	"ef4"		3:47
6.	"eog-3"	Bixler-Zavala; Rodríguez-López	4:08
7.	"f39h"		4:52
8.	"f9h0"		6:53
9.	"k49"	Bixler-Zavala; Rodríguez-López	3:32
10.	"pi4"		5:16
11.	"qr5'"		6:42
12.	"s[fqw"		5:38
13.	"xv8"		3:59
14.	"y2g"	Bixler-Zavala; Rodríguez-López	10:36
15.	"ytj6"		6:21

=== Notes ===
Sources:

1. An outtake from Noctourniquet. The song was called "In the Vulpine Clouds"
2. Early demo of "Molochwalker"
3. An instrumental demo of "Sea is Rising" on Unicorn Skeleton Mask and "What's Left in You" on Zapopan
4. Instrumental of "El Vacio" and "Piojos Histéricos" from Arañas en la Sombra
5. Instrumental of "Truth Blinds Us" from Cell Phone Bikini
6. An outtake from Noctourniquet. The song was called "Aneidolon"
7. Instrumental of "Un Mar Amargo" and "Metamorfosis" from Arañas en la Sombra
8. Instrumental of "Casate Colmillo" from The Somnambulists and "Extravagants Dientes" from Arañas en la Sombra
9. Likely outtake from Octahedron
10. Instrumental of "Happiness" from Unicorn Skeleton Mask and "Reap The Roots", "Tandem Happiness", and "Fielding Souls" from Zapopan
11. Instrumental of "Primitivo Y Barbaro" and "Semilas De Hez"
12. Earlier demo of ",14"
13. Instrumental of "Asco Que Conmueve los Puntos Erógenos"
14. Demo of "Vicarious Atonement"
15. Earlier demo of ",14" and "s[fqw"

== Personnel ==
=== The Mars Volta ===
- Omar Rodríguez-López – guitar, additional contributions
- Cedric Bixler-Zavala – vocals
- Juan Alderete de la Peña – bass
- Eva Gardner – bass
- Blake Fleming – drums
- Jon Theodore – drums
- Thomas Pridgen – drums
- Deantoni Parks – drums
- Isaiah "Ikey" Owens – keyboards
- John Frusciante – additional guitars

=== Artwork ===
- Sonny Kay – design, layout
