= Eva Gardner =

American bassist (born 1979)

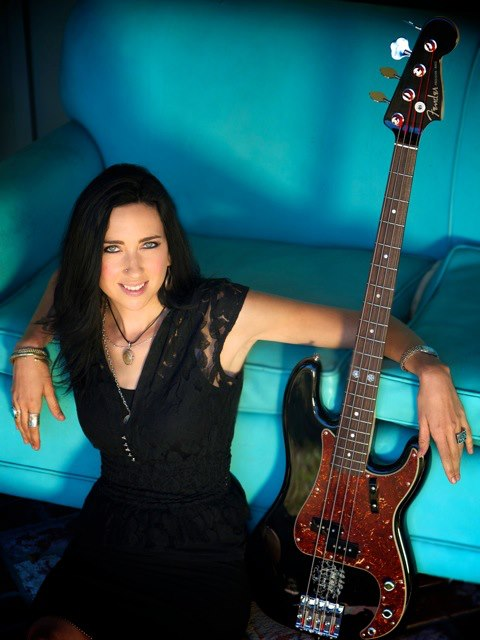
- Gardner with her signature Fender Precision bass in 2013

Background information
- Born: Eva Catherine Gardner; February 17, 1979 (age 47); Los Angeles, California, U.S.
- Origin: United States
- Genres: Progressive rock, experimental rock
- Occupation: Bassist

Eva Catherine Gardner (born February 17, 1979) is an American bassist from Los Angeles. A founding member of The Mars Volta, she has been a studio and touring musician in bands for Cher, Gwen Stefani, P!NK, Veruca Salt and Tegan and Sara.

== Early life ==
Eva Gardner is the daughter of The Creation bassist Kim Gardner, and cites her father as her primary influence. She is a graduate of the Los Angeles County High School for the Arts, where she studied under trumpet player Bobby Rodriguez. She holds a degree in ethnomusicology from UCLA (cum laude).

== Career ==
Gardner was the original bassist for The Mars Volta (2001). Her work appears on their first EP Tremulant and although she did not perform on the recording of De-Loused in the Comatorium, she did write some of the basslines. She left due to complications of her father dying while The Mars Volta was on tour.

In 2003 she toured the UK with Tim Burgess (singer for The Charlatans) and also toured the US with El Vez.

During January 2005, Gardner was touring bassist for Veruca Salt during a tour of Australia. She is also the bassist for Los Angeles–based band Lyra.

Gardner joined Pink's band in 2007. She completed touring Europe and South Africa in September 2007 and did promotion for the release of Funhouse in 2008. In 2009, Gardner was touring bassist for Pink's record-breaking Funhouse Tour (Europe, Australia, UK, United States). She continued touring with Pink in 2010 for the Funhouse Summer Carnival Tour in Europe, the final tour of the Funhouse album era.

In 2011, Gardner formed Telstar with Chris Unck of Butch Walker and the Black Widows, recorded Hot Knives EP and the two singles "Getting Around Town" and "Lightning's Girl", plus released music videos for "Are You Hungry" and "everysinglebodyelse".

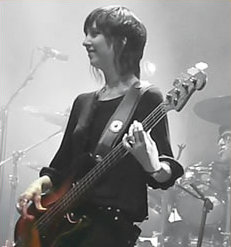
Gardner performing

As a returning member of Pink's band, Gardner began promotional appearances in support of The Truth About Love, with a September 2012 album release date.

Gardner appeared in an episode of My Ghost Story (season 6, episode 1), talking about her father's restaurant being haunted.

While on a break in the middle of Pink's The Truth About Love Tour, Gardner joined Moby's band for performances on Conan, plus three live shows at The Fonda Theatre in Los Angeles on October 3–5, 2013.

In January 2014, Gardner's signature Precision Bass was released for public purchase via Squier by Fender. The bass features a graphic of a ship that is a replica image of a tattoo on her arm.

On January 26, 2014, Gardner played bass at the 56th Grammy Awards during Pink's live performance.

Gardner was the bassist for Cher's 2014 Dressed to Kill Tour.

In 2015 she appeared in an episode of Transparent (season 2, episode 9) with The Indigo Girls.

In 2016, Gardner joined Tegan and Sara on their Love You to Death Tour.

In early 2017, she joined the Classic Cher residency show with dates in Las Vegas and Washington, D.C.

From 2017 to 2019, Gardner was Pink's live bassist on the Beautiful Trauma World Tour.

In 2022, Gardner officially returned as the bassist for The Mars Volta. She would tour with the band until September 2022, when she left to continue her bassist duties with Pink. Gardner would contribute to The Mars Volta's next three studio albums. In October 2025, she returned onstage with the band in support of their headlining tour.

== Discography ==
=== Solo ===
- Chasing Ghosts (2019)
- Love & Drugs (single) (2020)
- Darkmatter (2021)

=== With The Mars Volta ===
- Tremulant (2002)
- La Realidad De Los Sueños – Boxset (2021)
- The Mars Volta (2022)
- Que Dios Te Maldiga Mi Corazón (2023)
- Lucro Sucio; Los Ojos del Vacio (2025)
- Lucro Sucio; Unfinished Business (2026)

=== With Omar Rodríguez-López ===
- Arañas en La Sombra (2016)
- Killing Tingled Lifting Retreats (2017)

=== With Lyra ===
- Protocol (2006)
- Move (2007)

=== With P!nk ===
- Funhouse Tour: Live in Australia (2009)
- The Truth About Love Tour: Live from Melbourne (2013)
- Beautiful Trauma Live: P!nk (2017)
- All I Know So Far: Setlist (2021)
- Pink: All I Know So Far (2021 film)
- Pink: Summer Carnival Tour (Australia and New Zealand Tour 2024)

=== With Moby ===
- Moby: innocents – Live at the Fonda, LA] (2014)

=== With Alice Bag ===
- Blueprint (2018)

=== With Marissa Nadler ===
- For My Crimes (2018)

=== With Telstar ===
- Hot Knives – EP (2011)
- Lightning's Girl – single (2011)
- Getting Around Town – single (2011)

=== Happy Endings Soundtrack w/ Maggie Gyllenhaal ===
- Music From the Film (2005)

=== With Miranda Lee Richards ===
- Light of X (2009)

=== With Leerone ===
- Imaginary Biographies (2007)

=== With Little Sandwitch ===
- Little Sandwitch
