= Wild International =

Single by One Day as a Lion

from the EP One Day as a Lion
- Released: July 16, 2008
- Genre: Rap rock
- Label: Anti-
- Songwriters: Zack de la Rocha, Jon Theodore

Music video
- "Wild International" on YouTube

"Wild International" is the first track and single from One Day as a Lion's self-titled five track EP. This track was first revealed on July 16, 2008. It was made available to stream on the band's Myspace page. On the same day the song was premiered by Los Angeles radio station KROQ-FM and on Australian radio station Triple J. It peaked at No. 20 on the Billboard Modern Rock Tracks chart and No. 6 in Norway.

== Inspiration ==
When Zack de la Rocha was asked about the song, he said,

...that song is a response to the way we saw the U.S. government try to reframe the conflicts of the world. Particularly when the Soviet Union had collapsed, there was no way to subject the country to the kind of fear needed to justify what I consider to be an ill distribution of wealth. After 9/11 you could see that reframing taking place. The specter of Communism no longer haunted the U.S., justifying its actions in Latin America and all over the world. What filled that void were Al Qaeda and the Muslim world in general. That song is, in an abstract way, addressing the way the [political Right] has distracted people from this huge rush of wealth from the bottom to the top.

Beyond that, I'm speaking toward a deeper sentiment that I feel and I know a lot of people feel. Most of the songs have to do with redemptive moments that come in the face of some real indignity. And that’s the current that I'm trying to tap into, because I think that for a lot of people — for the real participants who live in the shadows and work at car washes and are forced to cross the border and are struggling and facing the real economic consequences — they’re often left out off the debate because of the language they speak or even the terminology that they use.

So it stems from my own frustration. It stems from seeing how things have been developing politically, and watching so much dissatisfaction and people very upset about the way the country is going. And watching all of that frustration steered back into a more traditional political process.

When told the song seemed anti-religious, he said,

I don't see it as an anti-religious song. I see it as the West has been using Christianity as a way to justify its actions when in reality, those figures, Christ and Muhammad, were rebels. These two religious figures have been co-opted to justify power, although they fought against the abuses of power and the expansion of empire. It’s almost like, what would Christ and Muhammad do?

== Charts ==
Chart (2008)	Peak position
US Modern Rock Tracks	20
Norway Singles Chart	6
