= Scabdates =

Live album by The Mars Volta
- Released: November 8, 2005
- Recorded: May 2004–May 2005, Various live performances
- Genres: Progressive rock, experimental rock
- Length: 72:54
- Labels: Gold Standard Laboratories; Universal Records; Strummer
- Producer: Omar Rodríguez-López

The Mars Volta chronology
Frances the Mute (2005)	Scabdates (2005)	Amputechture (2006)

Scabdates is the second official live recording from the band The Mars Volta. It was released on November 8, 2005 and features music recorded between May 2004 and May 2005 during the tours in support of De-Loused in the Comatorium and Frances the Mute. In 2011, NME magazine named it one of the 50 greatest live albums of all time. The "And Ghosted Pouts" section of "Take the Veil Cerpin Taxt" was used in the film Get Him to the Greek.

== Overview ==
Only three of the band's songs are represented on Scabdates, which mainly comprises expansions on musical themes which appear elsewhere in their work, or entirely new segments altogether, such as the lengthy exposition on "Cicatriz"; which, when combined with its introduction "Haruspex", accounts for over 48 minutes of the album. Its lengthy jam incorporates themes which would later be used in "Cassandra Gemini" almost a year later on Frances the Mute. By contrast, the Scabdates version of "Concertina" is shorter than its studio counterpart released on the Tremulant EP. The album ends with Cedric thanking the audience by telling them to "go home and take a bath."

Portions of the album include overdubbing and tape effects that were not part of the original live recordings. "Abrasions Mount the Timpani" features field recordings of mewling babies and airliner announcements that Omar recorded on the road, while "Cicatriz" incorporates an eight-minute psychedelic sound collage of other Mars Volta live performances (notably performances of "Eunuch Provocateur" and "Cassandra Gemini"), alongside field recordings of the band and others talking and laughing. The album, like many live albums before it, was also mixed to sound as if it came from one performance.

Rodriguez subsequently commented on the compilation of the album that:

I listened to my favorite live records, and said, "Okay, that's nice. What would I want as a fan?" When I was a kid, I always wanted little moments about the band on tour, so I could imagine them in my head. You hear our live record, and it starts with sound check and our technicians speaking about what's wrong with the microphone. And then there's us backstage, and then it goes into the concert, and then in the middle of a song, I put in some conversations we had on the tour bus. All these things are really appealing to me. A lot of people who were upset said, "This is not a live album. It includes all this other bullshit. And it has overdubs!" It has no overdubs, it was just mixed in a creative way.

== Reception ==
Professional ratings
Aggregate scores
Source	Rating
Metacritic	(58/100)
Review scores
Source	Rating
Allmusic	3.5/5 stars
Entertainment Weekly	B
IGN	(5/10)
Paste	(4/10)
Pitchfork Media	(3.5/10)
PopMatters	6/10 stars
Punknews.org	3.5/5 stars
Rolling Stone	3/5 stars
Sputnikmusic	(2/5)
Tiny Mix Tapes	0.5/5 stars
Ultimate Guitar	(8.4/10)

The Mars Volta have freely encouraged the trading of bootlegged live performances, but Scabdates was lauded by many fans for its superior sound quality and for being the first official recording that captured the Volta's lengthy experimental workouts during live performances. Some critics were not impressed with the band's jam sessions, with IGN describing the album as "sonic meandering which some regard as genius and others find to be a futile exercise in pretentious instrumental masturbation."

The album scored a 58/100 on Metacritic, indicating "mixed or average reviews". Some reviews were positive: Under the Radar gave it a score of seven stars out of ten and called it "One of those rare live offerings: a document that actually complements the band's catalog." NME gave it a score of seven out of ten and called it "marvelous".

Other reviews were pretty average, mixed or negative: The Austin Chronicle gave it three stars out of five and said: "Seventy-three crack-in-the-earth's-crust minutes liquefy into the same basic miasma as the sophomore LP that inspired them, yet more streamlined, less apt to wander into the ambient dead zones like 'Caviglia,' a problematic disconnection of the disc's overall forward thrust." Uncut also gave it three stars and said, "Your appreciation of Scab Dates will be predicated on a high tolerance to long bongo solos and songs called things like 'Abrasions Mount The Timpani'." Prefix Magazine gave it an average review and said the album "does an adequate job of capturing what is best experienced in the flesh." Blender gave it two stars out of five and said, "The songs get lost in waves of wah-wah long before a long, slow fade into random-noise oblivion." Pitchfork Media gave it a score of 3.5 out of ten and said it was "neither a concession nor a step forward, revealing inclinations that feel half as indulgent as they should when following a record like Frances the Mute, and about half as interesting to listen to."

As of February 2007 it has sold 64,000 copies in United States.

== Track listing ==
Like Frances the Mute, portions of Scabdates were cut into separate sections for the CD pressing. "Take the Veil Cerpin Taxt" was spread along three tracks, while "Cicatriz" was spread across five; the fifth section, "Part IV", begins with the sound collage mentioned above. On vinyl, "Cicatriz" was split along three sides: "Cicatriz" ended side B, "Parts I-III" on side C, and "Part IV" taking up Side D.

=== Finalized track listing ===
No.	Title	Length
1.	"Abrasions Mount the Timpani"	4:07
2.	"Take the Veil Cerpin Taxt" (Gust of Mutts - And Ghosted Pouts)	13:23
3.	"Caviglia"	2:46
4.	"Concertina"	4:17
5.	"Haruspex"	5:24
6.	"Cicatriz" (Cicatriz - Part I - Part II - Part III - Part IV)	42:58

=== CD pressing ===
No.	Title	Length
1.	"Abrasions Mount the Timpani"	4:07
2.	"Take the Veil Cerpin Taxt"	5:57
3.	"Take the Veil Cerpin Taxt A. Gust of Mutts"	2:34
4.	"Take the Veil Cerpin Taxt B. And Ghosted Pouts"	4:52
5.	"Caviglia"	2:46
6.	"Concertina"	4:17
7.	"Haruspex"	5:24
8.	"Cicatriz"	8:16
9.	"Cicatriz A. Part I"	2:34
10.	"Cicatriz B. Part II"	7:39
11.	"Cicatriz C. Part III"	4:29
12.	"Cicatriz D. Part IV"	20:01

== Source of recordings ==
05/12/2004 – Wiltern Theatre – Los Angeles, CA

- "Haruspex"
- "Cicatriz"

05/13/2004 – Wiltern Theatre – Los Angeles, CA

- "Caviglia"

05/05/2005 – Roseland Ballroom – New York City, NY

- "Abrasions Mount the Timpani"
- "Take the Veil Cerpin Taxt"

05/06/2005 – Roseland Ballroom – New York City, NY

- "Gust of Mutts / And Ghosted Pouts"

05/10/2005 – Avalon Ballroom – Boston, MA

- "Concertina"

== Personnel ==
=== The Mars Volta ===
- Omar Rodríguez-López – guitar, field recordings
- Cedric Bixler-Zavala – vocals
- Juan Alderete de la Peña – bass guitar
- Jon Theodore – drums
- Isaiah Ikey Owens – keyboards
- Marcel Rodríguez-López – percussion, synthesizers
- Adrián Terrazas-González – wind instruments, percussion (2005 dates only)
- Pablo Hinojos-Gonzalez – sound manipulation ("Concertina")

=== Technical ===
- Jonathan Debaun – recording, engineer, crew
- Omar Rodriguez-Lopez – mixing
- Howie Weinberg – mastering
- Roger Liam – mastering assistant
- Kristen Welsh – coordinator
- Amery Awol Smith – crew
- Greg Nelson – crew
- Henry Trejo – crew
- Jerry Riccardi – crew
- Jesse Isaacs – crew
- Joe Paul Slaby – crew
- Shaun Sebastian – crew
- Steve Taylor – crew
- Dan Hadley – lighting
- Keith Mitchell – lighting
- Lalo Medina – tour manager
- Paul Drake – tour manager

=== Artwork ===
- Danielle Van Ark – photographs
- Sonny Kay – design, layout
- Omar Rodríguez-López – art direction
- Cedric Bixler-Zavala – art direction

== Charts ==
Chart performance for Scabdates
Chart (2005)	Peak position
Australian Albums (ARIA)	87
Canadian Albums (Nielsen SoundScan)	89
Japanese Albums (Oricon)	141
US Billboard 200	76
