= The Widow (song) =

Single by the Mars Volta

from the album Frances the Mute
- B-side: "Frances the Mute"
- Released: March 14, 2005
- Recorded: 2004
- Genre: Progressive rock; blues rock
- Length: 5:51 (Album version); 3:19 (Single edit)
- Label: Universal
- Songwriters: Cedric Bixler-Zavala; Omar Rodríguez-López
- Producer: Omar Rodríguez-López

The Mars Volta singles chronology
"Televators" (2004)	"The Widow" (2005)	"L'Via L'Viaquez" (2005)

"The Widow" is a song by the Mars Volta, from their second album, Frances the Mute. It was released on March 14, 2005 as the album's lead single.

The song peaked at number 95 on the US Billboard Hot 100, making it the band's first and only single to chart there. The song also reached number 20 in the UK Singles Chart and peaked at number 7 on the Billboard Alternative Songs chart.

== Background ==
The song was first performed in May 2004 at the Wiltern Theatre in Los Angeles during The Mars Volta's three-night residence closing the tour supporting their debut LP, De-Loused in the Comatorium. At the concert, the song was dedicated to former Mars Volta member Jeremy Ward, who died of a drug overdose in May 2003.

"The Widow" is notably the only short, pop-structured song on Frances the Mute, although the album-version features a lengthy, non-radio-friendly, atonal outro of organ and electronic spasms, taking up the later half of the track. The edit of "The Widow" cuts the last instrumental part of the regular album track and fades out when the vocals start to become distorted. It is also the only Mars Volta song to chart in the United States. The song is notable for its consistently high lead vocals which never go below the alto register.

The song features a brief trumpet part from Flea after the second chorus. Omar performs a brief solo in the same section. On the version of the single called "Frances the Mute", the studio version is replaced by a live recording of one of the first performances of the song at The Wiltern in 2004, and features only acoustic guitar and vocals, with some distortion effects.

== "Frances the Mute" ==
The single also contains the 14-minute track "Frances the Mute", which was not included on the album of the same name. Many fans, based on comments by the band, consider this additional song as part of the Frances the Mute album and place it first in the running order, before "Cygnus....Vismund Cygnus".

== Usage in media ==
The song appeared on an episode of Rescue Me.

In July 2020, rapper Kanye West posted a video on Twitter of him listening to "The Widow", with the text "The Mars Volta we need to finish the album."

== Track listing ==
=== The Widow ===
1. "Frances the Mute" – 14:39
  - "In Thirteen Seconds"
  - "Nineteen Sank, While Six Would Swim"
  - "Five Would Grow and One Was Dead"
2. "The Widow" (edit) – 3:19

== Charts ==
=== Weekly charts ===
Weekly chart performance for "The Widow"
Chart (2005)	Peak position
Scottish Singles Sales (Official Charts)	21
UK Singles (Official Charts)	20
US Billboard Hot 100	95
US Alternative Airplay (Billboard)	7
US Mainstream Rock Airplay (Billboard)	25

=== Year-end charts ===
Year-end chart performance for "The Widow"
Chart (2005)	Position
US Modern Rock Tracks (Billboard)	42
