= One Day as a Lion (EP) =

One Day as a Lion EP

EP by One Day as a Lion
- Released: July 18, 2008
- Genre: Rap rock
- Length: 20:20
- Label: Anti-

Professional ratings
Review scores
Source	Rating
AllMusic	4/5 stars
Billboard	(favourable)
Drowned in Sound	(8/10)
Rolling Stone	4/5 stars
The Skinny	4/5 stars

One Day as a Lion is the debut EP and only release by One Day as a Lion, the musical duo consisting of Rage Against the Machine frontman Zack de la Rocha on vocals/keyboard and Jon Theodore, formerly of The Mars Volta, on drums. The mixing for the album was done by Mario C.

On July 16 the track "Wild International" was made available to stream on the band's MySpace page. It was also premiered by Los Angeles radio station KROQ as well as Australian radio station Triple J. The EP was released on July 18, 2008, in Australia and July 22, 2008, in the US.

== Commercial performance ==
One Day as a Lion debuted at number 28 on the US Billboard 200, selling 17,000 copies in its first week.

== Track listing ==
All tracks are written by Zack De La Rocha and Jon Theodore.

No.	Title	Length
1.	"Wild International"	3:47
2.	"Ocean View"	4:07
3.	"Last Letter"	3:58
4.	"If You Fear Dying"	3:57
5.	"One Day as a Lion"	4:25
Total length:		20:20

== Personnel ==
- Zack de la Rocha – vocals, keyboards
- Jon Theodore – drums

== Charts ==
Chart performance for One Day as a Lion
Chart (2008)	Peak position
Australian Albums (ARIA)	56
US Billboard 200	28
US Top Independent Albums	3
