= Landscape Tantrums =

Demo album by The Mars Volta
- Released: April 23, 2021
- Recorded: 2002
- Studio: Mad Dog Studios
- Genres: Progressive rock, experimental rock
- Length: 46:29
- Label: Clouds Hill
- Producer: Omar Rodríguez-López

The Mars Volta chronology
The Ramrod Tapes (2013)	Landscape Tantrums (2021)	The Mars Volta (2022)

Landscape Tantrums is an album by the American rock group The Mars Volta, consisting of the demo recordings for their debut album De-Loused in the Comatorium (2003). It was released on April 23, 2021, as part of the La Realidad De Los Sueños box set.

Some of the songs are substantially different from the versions released on De-Loused, particularly featuring more prominent sound effects manipulation by Jeremy Ward. The band recorded the demos themselves, before enlisting the help of producer Rick Rubin who went on to co-produce their first album along with guitarist Omar Rodríguez-López. The name, Landscape Tantrums, is taken from a lyric in "Cut That City", their first officially released song from Tremulant.

== Overview ==
Landscape Tantrums is The Mars Volta's first recording of what would become their debut album De-Loused in the Comatorium. It was recorded in 2002 and features a collection of unmastered demo tracks. Released on April 23, 2021, it was included in the La Realidad De Los Sueños box set that was published on the same day. Rick Rubin, who co-produced the band's first album, is absent from this recording.

The description of Landscape Tantrums given upon its release states that the tracks were lost for two decades, and Rodriguez-Lopez didn't merely view them as demos or a "dry run" at the time. The statement also mentions the band's turmoil upon the album's recording and that its completion was nothing short of a miracle, and also describes the quick conception of the album as the group "sketched out the peaks" of the record in a less than a week.

Many of the tracks feature additional vocal and sound effects not found on De-Loused in the Comatorium. This is characteristic of sound manipulator Jeremy Ward's work."Take the Veil Cerpin Taxt" is lacking vocals in this version and is almost purely instrumental. The tracks "Tira me a las arañas" and "Cicatriz ESP" are notably absent from the album, the latter of which is especially intriguing considering an earlier version of the song, then titled "Cicatrix," was recorded during the Tremulant EP era. Other primitive versions of certain tracks of the album have also been circulating online for years under the name "Summer Demos."

== Reception ==
Professional ratings
Review scores
Source	Rating
Sputnikmusic	(3/5)

Landscape Tantrums got a negative review from Sputnikmusic. They described the demos as "inferior [to De-Loused in the Comatorium] in almost every conceivable way," and "Cedric in particular is drowning in vacuous vocal effects for the majority of these demos, which in turn has a detrimental effect on the emotional trajectory of various crescendo-building moments. . ."

Mxdwn.com gave a more positive review, stating that the album is a novelty for its place in the history of the band and the post-hardcore scene. The site also mentions that the album will be of interest to the band's most devoted fans despite the unpolished state of some of the tracks. However, Spin.com suggests the unpolished state and abrasiveness might actually be more appealing to listeners.

== Track listing ==
All lyrics are written by Cedric Bixler-Zavala with the help of Jeremy Ward; all music is composed by Omar Rodríguez-López, except where noted.

No.	Title	Writer(s)	Length
1.	"Roulette Dares (The Haunt of)"		6:37
2.	"Son Et Lumière"		2:17
3.	"Inertiatic ESP"		3:58
4.	"Drunkship of Lanterns"	Rodríguez-López; Bixler-Zavala	5:57
5.	"Eriatarka"		5:35
6.	"This Apparatus Must Be Unearthed"	Rodríguez-López; Bixler-Zavala	4:38
7.	"Televators"		4:56
8.	"Take the Veil Cerpin Taxt"		12:31
Total length:			46:29

== Personnel ==
=== The Mars Volta ===
- Omar Rodríguez-López – guitar
- Cedric Bixler-Zavala – vocals
- Jon Theodore – drums
- Ralph Jasso – bass
- Linda Good – keyboards
- Jeremy Ward – effects and sound manipulation

=== Recording personnel ===
- Omar Rodriguez-Lopez – director, arrangement, recording
- Jonathan DeBaun – recording, engineering, mixing
- Chris von Rautenkranz – mastering
- Florian Siller – mastering
