= One Day as a Lion =

American alternative rock band (2007–2011)

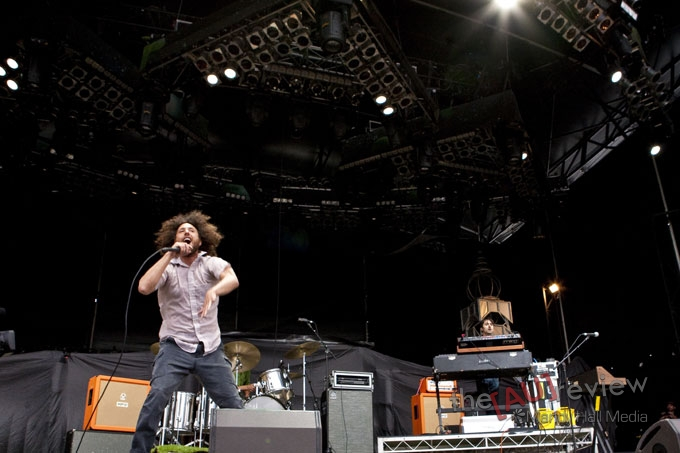
- One Day as a Lion in March 2011.

Background information
- Origin: Los Angeles, California, U.S.
- Genres: Rap rock, alternative rock, alternative hip hop, political hip hop
- Years active: 2007–2011
- Label: Anti-
- Spinoff of: Rage Against the Machine; The Mars Volta; The Locust
- Past members: Zack de la Rocha; Jon Theodore; Joey Karam

One Day as a Lion was a rap rock supergroup that was started in 2007 by Zack de la Rocha, the vocalist of Rage Against the Machine, and Jon Theodore, former drummer of The Mars Volta and then-current drummer of Queens of the Stone Age. The duo blended elements of rock and hip hop. One Day as a Lion released their eponymous debut EP in July 2008 on the Anti- label.

== History ==
Zack de la Rocha had known Jon Theodore for several years before the band was formed and was very impressed with his skills as a drummer, comparing him to John Bonham and Elvin Jones. The duo first started playing together at a mutual friend's rehearsal room with Theodore on drums and de la Rocha playing an old Rhodes Mark 1 keyboard through a delay pedal and an old metal amplifier. The band had soon written a number of songs and signed with Bad Religion guitarist and co-founder Brett Gurewitz's record label ANTI-.

On July 16, 2008, the song "Wild International" was made available to stream on the band's MySpace profile and was given its Australian radio premiere by Triple J and American radio premiere by KROQ. The band's eponymous debut EP was released on July 18, 2008, on the Anti- label in Australia and four days later in the US, and was also released on iTunes. The vinyl version was released on October 7, 2008. The EP placed as the 28 album of the week, selling 17,000 copies in its first week.

On August 11, 2008, de la Rocha spoke to the Los Angeles Times about the new project, his first interview in over eight years. He revealed that a full-length album was scheduled for an autumn 2008 release, and stated that they "want to play shows and be a band and go out and start some noise". He also mentioned adding members to the group, revealing "We're still in the process of forming as a band—we need a keyboard player, I'm not good enough to do it all myself—so that will be rectified soon". The full-length album, however, was never released.

On June 1, 2010, One Day as a Lion announced that they would play their first festival show at the Fuji Rock Festival in July via MySpace. On July 17 and 18, the band performed live for the first time in Pomona, California, with Joey Karam of The Locust on keys.

During their Australian tour in January 2011, One Day as a Lion dedicated 100% of their Melbourne show's proceeds to the Queensland flood relief. In an interview that same month, drummer Jon Theodore confirmed the official addition of Joey Karam to the band, and that a second release was in the works. Following a performance at Coachella that April, however, the band came to an end. No public announcement or reason was ever given by de la Rocha, Theodore or Karam regarding the split.

Later in 2011, de la Rocha reunited with Rage Against the Machine for a performance at that year's L.A. Rising festival. He would later reunite with them again in 2019, while also sporadically contributing to tracks by Run the Jewels as a guest vocalist. Theodore, meanwhile, joined Queens of the Stone Age on tour for their 2013 album ...Like Clockwork, and has remained with the band ever since. In 2022, Theodore sat in on a tour with Bright Eyes as their touring drummer. Karam resumed performing with The Locust until their split in 2022.

== Members ==
- Zack de la Rocha – vocals, keyboards
- Jon Theodore – drums, percussion
- Joey Karam – keyboards, organ
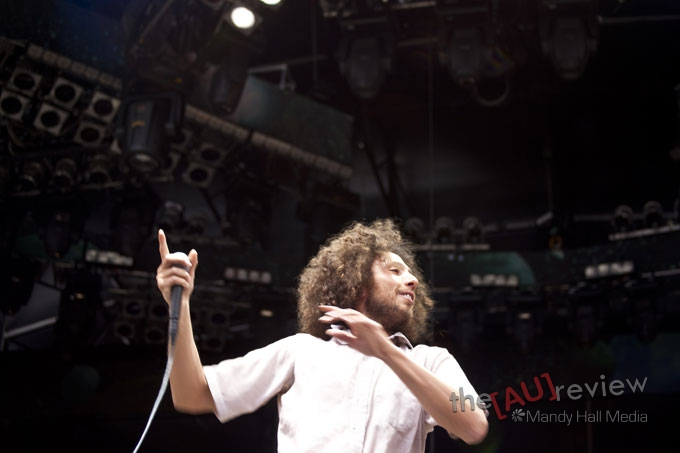
Zack de la Rocha

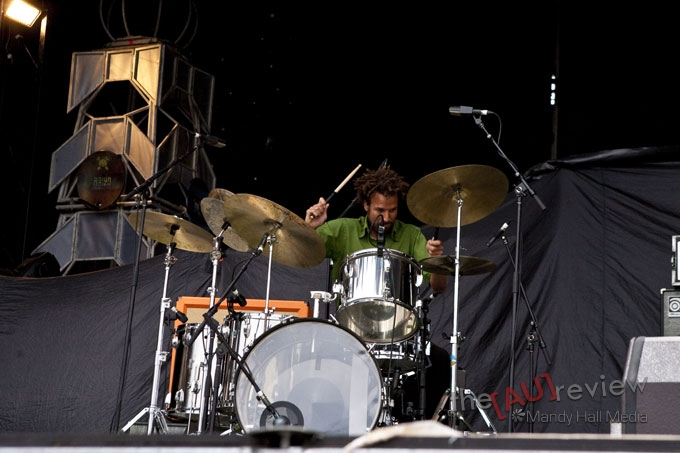
Jon Theodore

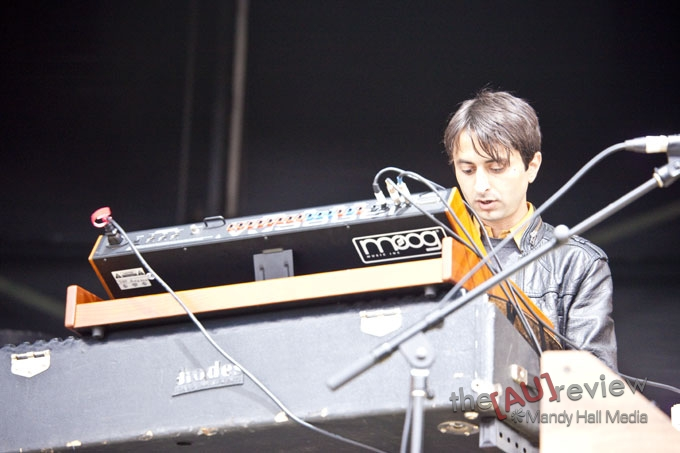
Joey Karam

== Discography ==
=== Extended plays ===
Title	EP details	Peak chart positions		
Title	EP details	US	US Ind.	AUS
One Day as a Lion	Released: July 18, 2008; Label: ANTI-; Format: CD, LP, DI	28	3	56

=== Singles ===
Title	Year	Peak chart positions		Album
Title	Year	US Alt	NOR	Album
"Wild International"	2008	20	6	One Day as a Lion
"One Day as a Lion"	2008	—	—	One Day as a Lion
"—" denotes a release that did not chart.
