= Amputechture =

Studio album by The Mars Volta
- Released: September 12, 2006
- Recorded: November 2005 – May 2006
- Studios: Los Angeles, California, El Paso, Texas and Melbourne, Australia
- Genres: Progressive rock; experimental rock; psychedelic rock
- Length: 76:03
- Labels: Gold Standard Laboratories; Universal; Strummer
- Producer: Omar Rodríguez-López

The Mars Volta chronology
Scabdates (2005)	Amputechture (2006)	The Bedlam in Goliath (2008)

Singles from Amputechture
- 1. "Viscera Eyes" Released: August 29, 2006

Amputechture is the third studio album by American progressive rock band the Mars Volta, released on September 12, 2006, on Gold Standard Laboratories and Universal Records. Produced by guitarist and songwriter Omar Rodriguez-Lopez, the album marks the final appearance of drummer Jon Theodore, and is the first studio album to feature guitarist and sound manipulator Paul Hinojos, formerly of At the Drive-In and Sparta.

Amputechture debuted at number 9 on the Billboard 200, selling over 59,000 copies in its opening week and an estimated 400,000 copies as of 2009.

== Overview ==
=== Production ===
The album was recorded in Los Angeles, California, El Paso, Texas, and Melbourne, Australia in late 2005 and early 2006. It was produced by Omar Rodríguez-López and mixed by Rich Costey.

Although most of Amputechture was newly written and recorded, the band also incorporated older material into some of the album's tracks. "Viscera Eyes" evolved from a song originally written by Omar while in At the Drive-In. "Day of the Baphomets" uses lyrics and melody from A Plague Upon Your Hissing Children an unreleased song that was recorded for De-Loused in the Comatorium. Bassist Juan Alderete said the bass solo introduction was recorded in one take.

In early July 2006, "Viscera Eyes" was officially released on the band's MySpace page. On July 13, the band also posted a link to a stream of the song in full on their website. Soon after, the full version of "Viscera Eyes" on the MySpace page was replaced by a radio edit running at 4:21. "Viscera Eyes" was also confirmed to be the album's first single.

This album is the band's first studio recording with former At the Drive-In bandmate Paul Hinojos and is also the last with drummer Jon Theodore. The album also features John Frusciante on lead guitar throughout, with Bixler-Zavala stating, "[Omar] taught Frusciante all the new songs, and Frusciante tracked guitars for us so Omar could sit back and listen to the songs objectively. It's great that he wants to help us and do that."

=== Themes ===
Amputechture marked the first time that The Mars Volta created an album without a single unifying narrative.

In an MTV interview posted on July 25, Cedric Bixler-Zavala said inspirations for the album were very diverse, ranging from the recent U.S. immigration marches to the news stories of possessed nuns. He discussed the concept, storyline, and overall mood of the album. He also explained the lyric writing process to "Time Off".

Omar Rodríguez-López stated in an interview with Switch Magazine that the word "Amputechture" (a portmanteau of amputate, technology, and architecture) was coined by the late Jeremy Ward.

The liner notes of The Mars Volta's previous album Frances the Mute feature a credit for "Amputekthure" under the "published by" credits, Cedric Bixler-Zavala's name under the ASCAP corporation. The word also appeared in the storybook accompanying De-Loused in the Comatorium.

=== Artwork ===
Unlike The Mars Volta's first two albums, Amputechture contains no original artwork; the background of each page in the album booklet is a section of Jeff Jordan's "Big Mutant", itself inspired by an image of Robert H. Goddard and his colleagues holding a rocket. In addition the CD art itself is "Dwarf Dancing", also by Jeff Jordan.

The artwork was originally to be done by Storm Thorgerson, who designed the covers for their first two albums, De-Loused in the Comatorium and Frances the Mute. His cover featured a picture of a woman standing in a field warding off the presence of a giant floating skull decorated in a mirrorball fashion. "They had wanted it to threaten a nun," Thorgerson told Classic Rock. "We preferred Romany, the wild gypsy girl who is telling the mirrored mask to 'sod off'." For reasons unknown, the band was unhappy with the outcome and used Jeff Jordan's art instead. Nonetheless, Thorgerson told Classic Rock in 2009 that "our last direct encounter with The Mars Volta – in the form of the bizarrely shaped Omar Rodriguez-López – was very friendly and touching."

== Reception ==
Professional ratings
Aggregate scores
Source	Rating
Metacritic	61/100
Review scores
Source	Rating
AllMusic	4/5 stars
Blender	4/5 stars
Entertainment Weekly	B
Los Angeles Times	3/4 stars
NME	5/10
The Observer	5/5 stars
Pitchfork	3.5/10
PopMatters	9/10
Rolling Stone	3.5/5 stars
Stylus	C−

The album has a score of 61 out of 100 from Metacritic, indicating "generally favorable reviews"; Amputechture is the band's lowest scored studio album on the website. Slant Magazine gave the album a score of four stars out of five and said it "shows a band honing their eruptive sound and bringing it into tight focus for the first time, routinely pushing their music to the wall without ever risking a breach." Punknews.org gave it a score of three-and-a-half stars out of five and praised the band for "producing a solid 76 minutes of actual music, and perhaps their most dynamically diverse performance since De-Loused. The album also sees a reduction in the dependence on concept, with Cedric's lyrics following more of a thematic arc than following a single storyline. The resulting lyrics enabled him to tackle a broader range of topics, though all filtered through the recurring theme of the effects of religion in the world." The A.V. Club gave it a B− and said, "Sequenced into one long, continuous piece of music, most of Amputechture's tracks arrive at impressive jazz-fusion pit stops that are all too brief."

Other reviews were more mixed: Under the Radar gave it a score of six stars out of ten and said, "With each album, the band seems to grab for so much, reaching further and further into the musical abyss, and still managing to craft songs that boggle the mind and dazzle the ears. The only question is whether all this is just too academic." Uncut gave it a score of three stars out of five and said, "It initially seems as if the moments of inspiration between self-indulgences are becoming scarcer. A bracing middle section rescues Amputechture." Spin gave it a score of six out of ten and said, "As over the top as all this can be, Amputechture has little of the thrash influence that's made modern prog so deadening, and the impenetrable lyrics... are easily overlooked." Billboard gave it an average review and said it "isn't for casual listening, so those checking out the Mars Volta for the first time should take it slow to prevent a sonic hangover."

Alternative Press gave the album two-and-a-half stars out of five and said that all the album did was to "test patience". Tiny Mix Tapes also gave it two-and-a-half stars out of five and called it "a bumpy ride, registering somewhere between [Frances the Mute] and debut full-length De-Loused in the Comatorium." The Village Voice gave it a mixed review and said it "highlights its predecessor's brilliance rather than asserting its own." Q gave it two stars out of five and said that the album "sounds like an explosion in a guitar shop." Prefix Magazine gave it a mixed review and said, "It's sad to see a band that touts itself as experimental sounding like a watered-down, unfocused version of its younger self." Now also gave it two stars out of five and said it was full of "tiring, spastic jazzy post-punk that smacks of musical masturbation". The Austin Chronicle likewise gave it two stars out of five and said it was "more a series of events than a complete experience. It's as though the Mars Volta is simply seeing what they can get away with."

Some band members have noted that the album wasn't as well-received as their earlier ones. In an interview with Geek Monthly, Cedric Bixler-Zavala called Amputechture the band's "most misunderstood record." He continued, "But if we had children and they were our records, AMP would be our autistic child. We're very overprotective of it because it doesn't function in the real world but it does other things that most humans can't do. That's why we really still love it because it's elicited such a strong reaction in the fans."

== Track listing ==
All lyrics written by Cedric Bixler-Zavala, all music composed by Omar Rodríguez-López.

No.	Title	Length
1.	"Vicarious Atonement"	7:19
2.	"Tetragrammaton"	16:41
3.	"Vermicide"	4:16
4.	"Meccamputechture"	11:03
5.	"Asilos Magdalena"	6:34
6.	"Viscera Eyes"	9:23
7.	"Day of the Baphomets"	11:57
8.	"El Ciervo Vulnerado"	8:50
Total length:		76:03

=== Notes ===
1. "Vicarious Atonement" is the theory that the atonement of Jesus Christ was legal in God's eyes and that Jesus died in the place of the humans that sinned.
2. "Tetragrammaton" is a reference to the four-letter Hebrew name יהוה (often rendered JHWH or YHWH in English) for the God of Judaism
3. "Vermicide" is any substance used to kill worms, especially those in the intestines, or the act of killing worms.
4. "Meccamputechture" is a portmanteau of Mecca (the holiest city in the Islamic faith), amputate, technology, and architecture.
5. "Asilos Magdalena" is Spanish for Magdalene asylums.
6. A "Baphomet" is an object used for idolizing, also confused with popular representations of Satan.
7. "El Ciervo Vulnerado" is Spanish for 'The Wounded Deer'. In Spanish 'ciervo' is the word for 'deer', although it is pronounced in the same way as 'siervo' in Latin American Spanish. In the Reina-Valera 1960 Edition of the Holy Bible, Jesus is referred to as 'El Siervo que fue vulnerado' or the 'Servant who was wounded'.

== Singles ==
- "Viscera Eyes" (2006)
- "Vicarious Atonement" (Promo only) (2006)

== Personnel ==
=== The Mars Volta Group ===
- Omar Rodríguez-López – guitars, bass ("Meccamputechture" verses), sitar ("El Ciervo Vulnerado"), direction
- Cedric Bixler-Zavala – vocals, tanpura ("El Ciervo Vulnerado")
- Juan Alderete – bass guitar
- Jon Theodore – drums
- Marcel Rodriguez-Lopez – percussion, keyboards, synthesizers, drums ("Meccamputechture" verses)
- Isaiah "Ikey" Owens – keyboards
- Adrián Terrazas-González – flute, tenor saxophone, bass clarinet, percussion
- John Frusciante – rhythm guitar, lead guitar
- Paul Hinojos – sound manipulation

=== Additional musicians ===
- Sara Christina Gross – saxophone on "Meccamputechture"

=== Recording personnel ===
- Omar Rodríguez-López – producer
- Jonathon Debaun – engineer
- Robert Carranza – engineer
- Paul Fig – engineer
- Rich Costey – mixing
- Pablo Arraya – mixing assistant
- Vlado Meller – mastering
- Kristen Welsh – coordinator
- Chris von Rautenkranz – mastering (vinyl)
- Florian Siller – mastering (vinyl)

=== Artwork ===
- Jeff Jordan – artwork
- Sonny Kay – layout

== Charts ==
Chart performance
Chart (2006)	Peak position
Australian Albums (ARIA)	6
Belgian Albums (Ultratop Flanders)	39
Belgian Alternative Albums (Ultratop Flanders)	23
Belgian Albums (Ultratop Wallonia)	73
Canadian Albums (Nielsen SoundScan)	12
Dutch Albums (Album Top 100)	54
Dutch Alternative Albums (Alternative Top 30)	3
European Albums (Billboard)	49
Finnish Albums (Suomen virallinen lista)	18
French Albums (SNEP)	95
German Albums (Offizielle Top 100)	49
Irish Albums (IRMA)	68
Italian Albums (FIMI)	40
Japanese Albums (Oricon)	19
New Zealand Albums (RMNZ)	16
Norwegian Albums (VG-lista)	12
Scottish Albums (Official Charts)	45
Swedish Albums (Sverigetopplistan)	27
Swiss Albums (Schweizer Hitparade)	88
UK Albums (Official Charts)	49
US Billboard 200	9
US Indie Store Album Sales (Billboard)	2
US Top Rock Albums (Billboard)	5
