= Jon Theodore =

American drummer (born 1973)

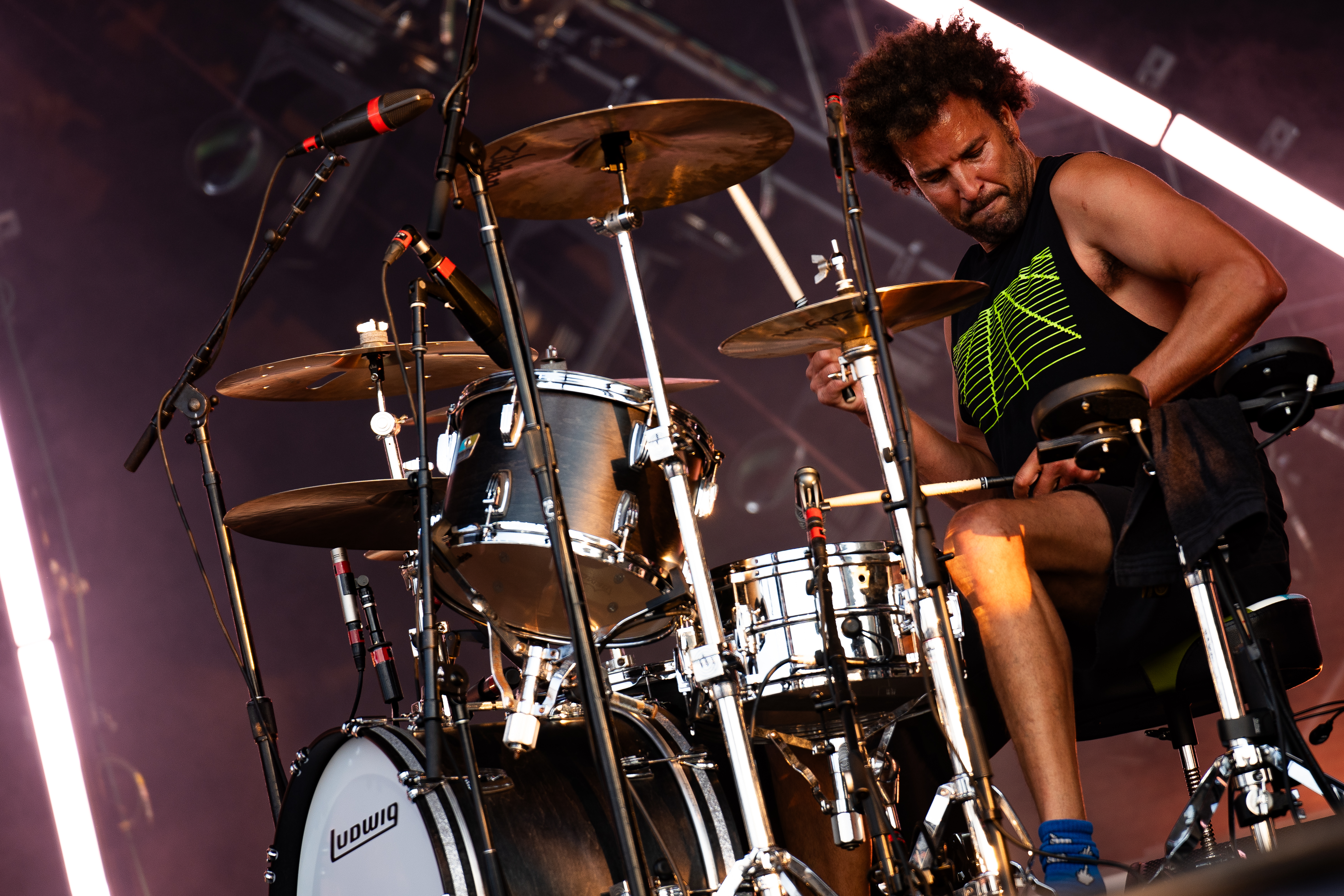

Background information
- Born: Jon Philip Theodore; December 30, 1973 (age 52)
- Origin: Baltimore, Maryland, U.S.
- Genres: Progressive rock; rap rock; experimental rock; stoner rock
- Occupation: Musician
- Instruments: Drums; percussion
- Years active: 1989–present
- Member of: Queens of the Stone Age; Mini Mansions
- Formerly of: The Mars Volta; One Day as a Lion; Golden; Royal Trux; Giraffe Tongue Orchestra; Bright Eyes

Jon Philip Theodore (born December 30, 1973) is an American drummer. He is best known as the longest-serving drummer of the hard rock band Queens of the Stone Age, whom he joined in 2013. Prior to this, Theodore was a member of the progressive rock band the Mars Volta from 2001 to 2006.

Known for his explosive, multi-textural playing style, Theodore was a member of both Golden and Royal Trux before joining The Mars Volta in 2001. Theodore remained within the band for five years, recording the band's first three studio albums, De-Loused in the Comatorium (2003), Frances the Mute (2005) and Amputechture (2006), before departing at the request of guitarist and bandleader Omar Rodríguez-López.

Theodore subsequently formed a collaboration with Rage Against the Machine vocalist Zack de la Rocha, entitled One Day as a Lion, and performed on Incubus frontman Brandon Boyd's solo album, The Wild Trapeze (2010). In 2012, Theodore replaced his Mars Volta successor Thomas Pridgen in the supergroup Giraffe Tongue Orchestra, though by 2015 the lineup had reverted to Pridgen on drums.

In 2013, Theodore joined Queens of the Stone Age, replacing longtime drummer Joey Castillo. After contributing to the closing track on the band's sixth studio album, ...Like Clockwork (2013), Theodore become a full member of Queens of the Stone Age for the album's accompanying tour. He has since recorded the albums, Villains (2017), In Times New Roman... (2023), and Perfecth (2026).

Theodore performed the drums on Bright Eyes' 2020 album Down in the Weeds, Where the World Once Was, and toured with them until 2022.

== Biography ==
Theodore grew up in the Baltimore area. His father is of Haitian descent, which influenced his drumming patterns. He first started playing drums at the age of 15. He was soon involved with his high school concert band at Gilman School in Baltimore, and took lessons on a full kit shortly after. It was at this point that he studied percussion and learned how to map arrangements; dedicated practice had already become a habit. He also listened to a great variety of music, growing to love the likes of Billy Cobham, Elvin Jones and John Bonham. He studied at the Oberlin Conservatory of Music in Ohio.

Around the end of his time in high school, he joined the band Golden and recorded and toured with them for ten years. He also played with Royal Trux for a year and a half. It was during this time that he met Cedric Bixler-Zavala and Omar Rodríguez-López, who were performing their first gig with their experimental dub band De Facto in El Paso, TX. They became friends and the former At the Drive-In duo would later invite Theodore to join their Latin-tinged progressive rock band, The Mars Volta.

Theodore was The Mars Volta's drummer from 2001 to 2006. On July 30, 2006, it was announced that Jon Theodore would be permanently replaced. In 2012, Mars Volta bassist Juan Alderete stated, "I love Jon, and I do keep in touch with him. Jon was unhappy and when someone is unhappy, someone has to pull the trigger; and it's Omar's band so he did just that. [...] They had to let him go because he wasn't into it as much as they wanted him to be." In a 2014 interview with comedian Dean Delray, Theodore stressed that his experience with The Mars Volta remains important to him:

I don’t regret it because it was an amazing experience, and the time we spent together was amazing, and the experiences we went through together were great, and the music that we made was great, to me. And now it’s been so long that I can only remember the awesome shit.

Theodore collaborated with Zack de la Rocha of Rage Against the Machine entitled One Day as a Lion. Their first EP was released on July 22, 2008. In January 2012, he joined Giraffe Tongue Orchestra, replacing fellow former Mars Volta drummer Thomas Pridgen. He recently played as Dam Funk's touring drummer during his Fall 2012 US Tour. From 2015-2017, Theodore rejoined his former bandmate Omar Rodríguez-López and contributed three of his solo albums.

A press release from the band Queens of the Stone Age revealed that Theodore would contribute drums on their upcoming album ...Like Clockwork. He played on the title track on the album, which was the first Queens album to reach number one on the Billboard 200. It also reached number two on the UK Albums Chart and was nominated for three Grammy Awards, including Best Rock Album. Following the release of the album in 2013, he became the permanent drummer of Queens of the Stone Age.

In 2018, Theodore performed drums on certain sections of the score for the video game Red Dead Redemption 2. His Queens of the Stone Age bandmates Josh Homme and Michael Shuman also are featured on the score.

In 2024, Theodore made his 7th appearance as a guest performer with The 8G Band on Late Night with Seth Meyers.

== Influences ==
Theodore draws inspiration from many different forms of music but those most prevalent in his playing are jazz, fusion, and rock. He has also touched upon another factor which adds to his individual style – "Then there's a whole bunch of stuff from Haiti because my dad's Haitian. My favorite Haitian drummer is this guy called Azor... The Haitian music that moves me has the drumming from the voodoo rituals. It moves me because the patterns are connected to different spirits; it's a spiritual thing that is interconnected with dancing, sacrifice and devotion. It's fully passionate. There is nothing contrived about it."

In interviews he regularly cites Billy Cobham of The Mahavishnu Orchestra as his main drumming influence: "My all-time favorite drummer is Billy Cobham. I love the way he plays ... [his] playing is so natural, powerful and dynamic at the same time. I pattern a lot of stuff after him." He has also been heavily inspired by John Bonham of Led Zeppelin: "He had one of the best feels in the history of rock ... because [of him] I try and play with as much bombast as I possibly can."

Theodore has also mentioned the following drummers and musicians as influences: Elvin Jones, Neil Peart, Keith Moon, Phil Rudd, Tony Williams, Sebastian Thomson, Tim Soete, Herbie Hancock, Doug Scharin, Joseph "Zigaboo" Modeliste, Mitchell Feldstein, Damon Che, Dale Crover, John McEntire, Ryan Rapsys and Brann Dailor.

== Discography ==
With Golden

- Golden
- Super Golden Original Movement
- Golden Summer
- Apollo Stars
- Rhythm & Beat Jazz 12"

With HiM

- New Features (2001)
- Five & Six In Dub (2000)
- Our Point Of Departure (2000)

With Hikaru Utada

- "Kremlin Dusk" (2004)

With Royal Trux

- 3-Song EP (1998)
- Veterans of Disorder (1999)

With Will Oldham

- Ease Down the Road

With Trans Am

- Illegal Ass EP
- The Red Line LP (2000)

With The Fucking Am

- Gold (2004)

With The Mars Volta

- Tremulant (2002)
- De-Loused in the Comatorium (2003)
- Live (2003)
- Frances the Mute (2005)
- Scabdates (2005)
- Amputechture (2006)
- Landscape Tantrums (2021) {recorded 2002}

With SaberTooth Tiger

- Death Valley b/w Love Money (GSL 12th Anniversary Single)
- Extinction Is Inevitable LP (2006)

With Omar Rodríguez-López

- Se Dice Bisonte, No Búfalo (2007) – "La Tiranía de la Tradición"
- Old Money (2008) – "Population Council's Wet Dream" & "Family War Funding (Love Those Rothschilds)"
- Arañas en La Sombra (2016)
- Some Need It Lonely (2016) – "Bitter Sunsets" & "Zophiel"
- Gorilla Preacher Cartel (2017) – "Buying Friendships"

With One Day as a Lion

- One Day as a Lion (EP, 2008)

With Holloys

- Art Wars (2009)
- Make It Happen (2009)

With Brandon Boyd

- The Wild Trapeze (2010)

With Puscifer

- Conditions of My Parole (2011)
- Money Shot (2015)

With Queens of the Stone Age

- ...Like Clockwork (2013) – "...Like Clockwork"
- iTunes Festival: London 2013 – EP (2013)
- ...Like Cologne – EP (2013)
- Villains (2017)
- In Times New Roman... (2023)
- Perfecth (2026)

With Life Coach

- Alphawaves (2013)

With Mini Mansions

- Leeds Festival (2019)

With Bright Eyes

- Down in the Weeds, Where the World Once Was (2020)

With Kirk Hammett

- Portals (2022)
