= Frances the Mute =

2005 studio album by The Mars Volta

- Cover art by Storm Thorgerson

Studio album by The Mars Volta
- Released: February 11, 2005
- Recorded: January–October 2004
- Genre: Progressive rock
- Length: 76:57 (CD edition); 77:19 (triple vinyl edition)
- Labels: Gold Standard Laboratories; Universal; Strummer
- Producer: Omar Rodríguez-López

The Mars Volta chronology
Live (2003)	Frances the Mute (2005)	Scabdates (2005)

Singles from Frances the Mute
- 1. "The Widow" Released: March 14, 2005; 2. "L'Via L'Viaquez" Released: July 11, 2005

Frances the Mute is the second studio album by American progressive rock band The Mars Volta released in February 2005 on Gold Standard Laboratories and Universal. Produced by guitarist and songwriter Omar Rodriguez-Lopez, the album incorporates dub, ambient, Latin and jazz influences, and is the first to feature bassist Juan Alderete and percussionist Marcel Rodriguez-Lopez. The album also includes contributions from future saxophonist Adrián Terrazas-González, who joined the band during its subsequent tour.

Frances the Mute made multiple "Best of" lists at the end of 2005. In the Q & Mojo magazine Classic Special Edition Pink Floyd & The Story of Prog Rock, the album came No. 18 in its list of "40 Cosmic Rock Albums" and was also named as one of Classic Rock magazine's 10 essential progressive rock albums of the decade.

== Background ==
According to the initial promotional statements about Frances the Mute, the narrative behind the album was inspired by a diary found by Jeremy Ward, close friend of Rodriguez-Lopez and Cedric Bixler Zavala and audio artist for The Mars Volta until his death in 2003. Ward had previously worked as a repo man, and one day he supposedly discovered an anonymous diary in the backseat of a car he was repossessing. Ward reportedly became preoccupied with the journal, and began to note similarities between his life and that of the author — most notably, that they had both been adopted. The diary told of the author's search for his biological parents, with the way being pointed by a collection of people, their names being the basis for each named track of Frances the Mute.

However, in the 2023 documentary Omar and Cedric: If This Ever Gets Weird, Rodriguez-Lopez confessed that the album's concept actually came from a film script he had written and given to Bixler Zavala for inspiration as the latter was having a writer's block at the time. The story about the diary was entirely invented, as a tribute to Ward.

== Writing and recording process ==
Some of the material which would end up on Frances the Mute, including "The Widow" and "Miranda That Ghost Just Isn't Holy Anymore", pre-dated De-Loused in the Comatorium, having been originally demoed by Omar Rodríguez-López in the early days of The Mars Volta. While touring in support of De-Loused, the band would incorporate more and more extended improvisational sections into some of their songs, often trying out new ideas. Parts of "Cygnus....Vismund Cygnus" ("Facilis Descenus Averni" and "Con Safo") were first performed live in the middle of "Drunkship of Lanterns" (as heard on Live EP) and "Take the Veil Cerpin Taxt" respectively, while parts of "Cassandra Gemini" originated from improvisations during "Cicatriz ESP" (as heard on Scabdates). The album was initially to be titled Sarcophagus.

Rodríguez-López arranged and produced the recording sessions himself. Unlike De-Loused in the Comatorium, which was recorded in producer Rick Rubin's mansion, sessions for the new album took place in multiple studios, with most tracking done in what Rodríguez-López described as "a shithole… Basically a warehouse with one little air conditioner on its last legs, awful wiring and a console you couldn’t rely on". Rather than bring his ideas to the band as a whole and working them out at group rehearsals, he met individually with each player to practice each part one-on-one. "We'll sit there and play it forever and slow—real slow—to understand what's happening. It's easy to play something fast and loud, but to play it soft and slow takes a certain amount of discipline. Then once we understand the part, everyone's free to elaborate—their personalities come out and it's not my part anymore; they get into and give it that swing that I can't give it." Rodríguez-López took the additional step of recording the band member separately before layering the various tracks to create each song. Drummer Jon Theodore was the first to record his parts, and he spent time arranging and mapping out the songs with Omar and in the process figuring out what the rhythmic structures would be stated on the recording process. "This is the first time I've ever been so methodical about recording. Normally I would go into the situation with as good an idea as I could, whether that was from performing the songs on tour or having a general road map. But this was the first instance where I considered every single hit all the way through, every figure up to and including every change. There were no question marks. So when I was tracking with the metronome it was just a question of right or wrong." An exception to this recording method was the middle section of "Cassandra Gemini", edited from a lengthy jam session.

Tracking this way had a mixed reception in the band; Theodore and bassist Juan Alderete responded well to the individualistic approach while keyboard player Isaiah "Ikey" Owens didn't like it at all. However, as Rodríguez-López stated, "People filling in ideas can become tedious and counterproductive. You find yourself working backwards. When you're in the studio 'what ifs' are your biggest enemy, so my general rule is, if it's something you can't live with—if a sentence begins with 'I can't' or 'I will not'—then we examine it. But if it's 'maybe we should' or 'I think that' then it's like, hey man, full steam ahead. Not that there isn't a lot of refinement to what we do—obviously there is— but I consider it a balance of raw energy and refinement."

Frances the Mute featured the largest array of guest musicians on any Mars Volta album to date. Flea, who played bass on De-Loused in the Comatorium, this time contributed trumpet to "The Widow" and "Miranda...". "L'Via L'Viaquez" featured guitar solos from John Frusciante as well as piano solos by salsa pianist Larry Harlow, the latter a longtime hero of Rodriguez-Lopez. Rodríguez-López described the session with Harlow in Puerto Rico as "a childhood dream come true". "Cassandra Gemini" featured flute and saxophone contributions from Mexican woodwind player Adrián Terrazas-González, who would join the band full time for the subsequent tour. All the tracks also included full string and horn sections, arranged by David Campbell with the help of Rodríguez-López. According to Cedric Bixler-Zavala, while recording a section in "Cassandra Gemini" one of the orchestra members played so hard that he broke his antique bow: "And you could see his ‘classical’ side come out – like, ‘I broke this playing a fuckin’ rock song??’ He was pissed off. But I was like, ‘Fuck yeah, man, that’s on the record! You’ve got to realise things like that are cool.’”

The mixing of Frances the Mute was done by Rich Costey. According to Rodriguez-Lopez, he and Costey had to mix the entire album three different times "to get it right".

In 2012, Juan Alderete noted that Frances the Mute is the studio album he is most proud of.

=== Sound and lyrics ===
Frances the Mute is comparable to The Mars Volta's 2003 release De-Loused in the Comatorium, with its cryptic lyrics and highly layered instrumentals, although the progressive rock influence is stronger on Frances the Mute than it was on De-Loused in the Comatorium. "The Widow" is notably the only short, pop-structured song on the album, although the last half of it features a lengthy, non-radio-friendly outro of manipulated tape loops of organs and electronic noise; for the single release, this part was edited out. Ambient noise plays a larger role on Frances the Mute than it does on De-Loused in the Comatorium: "Cygnus....Vismund Cygnus" ends with the recording of children's voices and passing cars (made by Omar Rodriguez-Lopez in front of the house where he used to live with Bixler-Zavala and Ward), while the first movement of "Miranda That Ghost Just Isn't Holy Anymore" ("Vade Mecum") features 4 minutes of coquí frogs (credited as "The Coquí of Puerto Rico" on the album sleeve) singing while a thick soundscape is slowly built from guitars, synthesizers and Bixler-Zavala's voice.

According to Rodriguez-Lopez, "Miranda..." was influenced by the music from western movies: "I'm a big fan of spaghetti-western and I think it shows on "Miranda". Our Morricone-influence has always been there, but on "Miranda" we let it all out. The last song ["Non-Zero Possibility"] on the last At the Drive-In album, the best thing we ever did by the way, had touches of spaghetti-western."

The fifth and final song of the album, "Cassandra Gemini", clocking at 32 minutes and 32 seconds is to date the longest studio song released by The Mars Volta. Rodriguez-Lopez said of the song: "Ever since I was a teenager, and had various listening experiences with the likes of King Crimson, John Coltrane, and Miles Davis's Bitches Brew, I've always wanted to do something like "Cassandra". Something deformed and out of control. Something enormous and violent, a whole album fitted into one composition. Something ruthless that no one can remain careless to."

Regarding the album's lyrical content, vocalist Cedric Bixler-Zavala stated:

A lot of it was [written] on the spot. Omar — because he collects TVs — would set up his wall of TVs again. We used to live together and he would set them up all the time — kind of like in the David Bowie movie, The Man Who Fell to Earth, he had a stack of TVs like that. So he would do that while I would record vocals, and that would be the main inspiration. So it was everything from The Magnificent Seven and any Akira Kurosawa stuff. And I wouldn't have [lyrics] written right away; I would just do takes of gibberish and then later try to fix them to make them into words. Sometimes he wanted to just keep the gibberish takes which he liked a lot better because it was the first reaction to the music. It's just really [about] being in a state of being willing to give up to the producer your scratch tracks, as opposed to really working on it and refining it.

== Release history ==
In December 2004, a full copy of Frances the Mute was leaked to the Internet from the vinyl version. The rip was of poor quality. Encoded as a 96 kbit/s MP3, other versions were reencoded to 192 kbit/s WMA from the source mp3, resulting in even worse audio quality. Gold Standard Laboratories issued a statement decrying the Internet release for its subpar sound quality, and suggesting that fans should respect the band's request not to share the leaked music.

Frances the Mute was released on February 11, 2005 in Japan and February 21, 2005 in Europe; the US release followed on midnight, March 1, 2005. The Japanese version included a bonus DVD with three videos from the band's live performance at the Electric Ballroom, London in 2003 as well as an audio of non-album track "Frances the Mute". Gold Standard Laboratories issued two vinyl versions of the album, a standard 3-LP set on black vinyl, and a limited-edition 4-LP set printed on glow-in-the-dark vinyl and packaged in a red plastic case; the fourth disc was a bonus 12" featuring "Frances the Mute" and a live acoustic version of "The Widow", recorded at The Wiltern, Los Angeles on May 6, 2004. A CD single featuring the same two tracks was given free with the purchase of the album at Best Buy stores in the US.

Frances the Mute sold over 100,000 copies within the first week of release, and debuted at number four on the Billboard Album Charts. As of February 2007 according to Nielsen SoundScan, 488,000 copies were sold in the United States. The album was the band's career best at No. 4 until their fourth album The Bedlam in Goliath came out almost 3 years later on the Billboard 200 at No. 3. The album was certified gold by the RIAA in the US for shipments of 500,000 albums on October 5, 2009.

In 2008, the edited version of "L'Via L'Viaquez" was featured on the video game Guitar Hero: World Tour.

== Reception ==
Professional ratings
Aggregate scores
Source	Rating
Metacritic	75/100
Review scores
Source	Rating
AllMusic	4.5/5 stars
Blender	4/5 stars
Entertainment Weekly	B−
The Guardian	3/5 stars
Mojo	4/5 stars
NME	7/10
Pitchfork	2.0/10
Q	4/5 stars
Rolling Stone	4/5 stars
Spin	A−

The album so far has a score of 75 out of 100 from Metacritic based on "generally favorable reviews". The Aquarian Weekly gave it an A and called it "a very heavyweight fight for a listener to get through". Punknews.org gave it all five stars and said, "Leave the hating to the real playa hatas, like Buc Nasty and Silky Johnson, because Frances The Mute will blow your mind. So give up your qualms about how pretentious this is, and how overindulgent, because given the chance, you're in for a hell of a ride." Drowned in Sound gave it a perfect score of ten and called it "a compulsory purchase." Spin gave it an A− and said it "explores an explosive groove Comatorium only implied." Kludge gave it a score of ten out of ten and called it a "multi-layered album that can be enjoyed through multiple artistic perspectives" which "works beautifully". Playlouder gave it four-and-a-half stars out of five and said, "Miraculously the lyrics never sound like the pompous shite they undoubtedly are. They fit the music and make the whole picture even more laughably and absurdly brilliant." In 2005, the album was ranked number 440 in Rock Hard magazine's book The 500 Greatest Rock & Metal Albums of All Time. In 2025, Loudwire ranked it as the ninth best progressive rock concept album ever conceived.

Blender gave it four stars out of five and called it "a visceral, powerful muso's record, a nerve-jangling explosion in a drum clinic." Paste also gave it four stars out of five and said it "bursts at the jewel-case hinges with Comatorium's trademarks: musical inventiveness and wildly emotive vocals." NME gave it a score of seven out of ten and said, "Within this impressive, ambitious, often stupid whole, are moments of melting human beauty." Billboard gave it a positive review and said the album "unfolds upon multiple listens, sometimes threatening to collapse under its own pretensions (meandering musical passages, sound effects), but ultimately, it is an ambitious and rewarding album." The A.V. Club also gave it a positive review and said, "On the whole, the record sounds more like the blueprint for a stunning live show than like a viable document of a top-flight hard rock band."

Other reviews are average, mixed or negative: Uncut gave it a score of three stars out of five and said it "smells like another concept album, is far too long and so pretentious as to be farcial. Amazingly, it's also mighty entertaining." The Guardian also gave it a score of three stars out of five and said of The Mars Volta: "You have to give them credit for ambition, though, because you're not going to find this particular witches' brew anywhere else." The New York Times gave it an average review and said, "The music combines the kitchen-sink inclusiveness of psychedelia with the swerves and jolts of the hip-hop era, to approach the ravenous eclecticism of Latin alternative rock." Yahoo! Music UK gave it five stars out of ten and called it "An incredibly accomplished record, a true testament to the band's imagination, intellectual curiosity and outrageous musical talent.... Unfortunately, 'Frances The Mute' is also awful." Under the Radar also gave it a score of five stars out of ten and said, "Omar Rodriguez-Lopez and Cedric Bixler-Zavala are fantastically talented musicians and arrangers. But until they rein in their astronomical pretension, they'll always look more important than they truly are."

== Track listing ==
The album was initially slated to have six songs, however the title track "Frances the Mute" (which was going to be the first song) was left out due to time constraints. The lyrics for the title track still appeared on the inside of the CD jewel case tray, while the song itself was released on "The Widow" single. The ending of "Frances the Mute" reprises the album's bookend, "Sarcophagi" filtered through radio static.

The finalized track listing had five tracks and was intended to be released as such on all formats. Because of disputes with Universal Records, "Cassandra Gemini" (listed as "Cassandra Geminni" on most versions of the album) (Note: The official spelling for the song title is "Cassandra Gemini", despite the typo "Geminni" printed on all parts of the CD packaging - the MusicBrainz database, the vinyl release of the album, and the band's official site all list the track as "Gemini".) was arbitrarily split into eight tracks on the CD version, taking up tracks 5 through 12, since the band would otherwise only be paid an EP's wages for a 5 track album. The splits also were not done according to the song's actual five movements (except the final one, "Sarcophagi"). On some digital stores such as iTunes and Amazon, "Cassandra Gemini" was available as a single track; currently, on streaming platforms it also appears split into 8 tracks with incorrect names which also do not accurately match the movements (some of the track names are erroneously taken from the movements of the previous song "Miranda That Ghost Just Isn't Holy Anymore").

=== Original track listing ===
All lyrics written by Cedric Bixler-Zavala, all music composed by Omar Rodríguez-López.

No.	Title	Length
1.	"Cygnus....Vismund Cygnus": "Sarcophagi"; "Umbilical Syllables"; "Facilis Descensus Averni (Note: Latin for "The Descent into Hell Is Easy")"; "Con Safo (Note: Chicano term that literally means "with respect" and in some translations is meant to deliver the message that any insult sent towards somebody does not matter.)"	13:02 0:44 2:34 5:26 4:18
2.	"The Widow"	5:51
3.	"L'Via L'Viaquez"	12:21
4.	"Miranda That Ghost Just Isn't Holy Anymore": "Vade Mecum (Note: Latin for "Go with Me")"; "Pour Another Icepick"; "Pisacis (Phra-Men-Ma) (Note: In Buddhism, a pisaca or pisaci is a demoness, and phra-men-ma are eight animal-headed deities who rule over the eight realms of consciousness, representing the wrathful counterparts of the eight Mahabodhisattvas.)"; "Con Safo"	13:09 4:17 4:38 2:42 1:32
5.	"Cassandra Gemini": "Tarantism"; "Plant a Nail in the Navel Stream"; "Faminepulse"; "Multiple Spouse Wounds"; "Sarcophagi"	32:32 0:39 4:06 16:27 10:25 0:55
Total length:		76:55

=== CD pressing ===
No.	Title	Length
1.	"Cygnus....Vismund Cygnus""	13:02
2.	"The Widow"	5:51
3.	"L'Via L'Viaquez"	12:21
4.	"Miranda That Ghost Just Isn't Holy Anymore"	13:09
5.	"Cassandra Gemini" (Tarantism / Plant a Nail in the Navel Stream)	4:46
6.	"Cassandra Gemini" (Faminepulse)	6:40
7.	"Cassandra Gemini" (Faminepulse (cont.))	2:56
8.	"Cassandra Gemini" (Faminepulse (cont.))	7:41
9.	"Cassandra Gemini" (Multiple Spouse Wounds)	5:00
10.	"Cassandra Gemini" (Multiple Spouse Wounds (cont.))	3:48
11.	"Cassandra Gemini" (Multiple Spouse Wounds (cont.))	0:47
12.	"Cassandra Gemini" (Sarcophagi)	0:54
Total length:		76:55

=== Japanese bonus DVD ===
"Frances the Mute" is presented as audio only; the rest is video.

No.	Title	Length
1.	"Frances the Mute": "In Thirteen Seconds"; "Nineteen Sank, While Six Could Swim"; "Five Would Grow and One Was Dead"	14:36 7:22 3:34 3:40
2.	"Drunkship of Lanterns" (live)
3.	"Cicatriz ESP" (live)
4.	"Televators" (live)

=== Best Buy exclusive ===
The Best Buy version of the album included a download card for one bonus track:

No.	Title	Length
1.	"The Widow" (live acoustic)	3:30

A second Best Buy promotion included a free separate CD of the song "Frances The Mute" itself along with the live acoustic "The Widow".

No.	Title	Length
1.	"Frances The Mute"	14:38
2.	"The Widow (Live)"	3:30

=== Vinyl pressing ===
On vinyl, "Cassandra Gemini" was split between two sides, in the middle of "Faminepulse". Each side of vinyl (save the final one) ends with a locked groove, repeating either a sound effect or a bar of music endlessly until the needle is lifted. The end of the first side and the start of the third side also contain the bookends of "L'Via L'Viaquez"; these small portions are indexed separately from both "The Widow" and "Miranda". This was more than likely done to allow the loops ending each side to function properly.

Side One
No.	Title	Length
1.	"Cygnus....Vismund Cygnus": "Sarcophagi"; "Umbilical Syllables"; "Facilis Descensus Averni"; "Con Safo"	13:02
2.	"The Widow"	5:50

Side Two
No.	Title	Length
3.	"L'Via L'Viaquez"	12:21

Side Three
No.	Title	Length
4.	"Miranda That Ghost Just Isn't Holy Anymore": "Vade Mecum"; "Pour Another Icepick"; "Pisacis (Phra-Men-Ma)"; "Con Safo"	13:48

Side Four
No.	Title	Length
5.	"Cassandra Gemini" (Pt. 1): "Tarantism"; "Plant a Nail in the Navel Stream"; "Faminepulse"	14:52

Side Five
No.	Title	Length
6.	"Cassandra Gemini" (Pt. 2): "Faminepulse"; "Multiple Spouse Wounds"; "Sarcophagi"	17:39

== Personnel ==
=== The Mars Volta ===
- Omar Rodríguez-López – guitars, synthesizers, field recordings, production
- Cedric Bixler-Zavala – vocals
- Jon Theodore – drums
- Isaiah "Ikey" Owens – keyboards
- Juan Alderete de la Peña – bass (Credited as "John Peter Alderete" on the 2021 vinyl version)
- Marcel Rodriguez-Lopez – percussion, keyboards

=== Additional musicians ===
- Lenny Castro – additional percussion (all tracks)
- Flea – trumpet on "The Widow" and "Miranda That Ghost Just Isn't Holy Anymore"
- John Frusciante – first two guitar solos on "L'Via L'Viaquez"
- Larry Harlow – piano on "L'Via L'Viaquez", treated clavinet on "Cassandra Gemini"
- Adrián Terrazas-González – tenor sax, flute on "Cassandra Gemini"
- Salvador (Chava) Hernandez – trumpet
- Wayne Bergeron – trumpet
- Randy Jones – tuba
- Roger Manning – piano
- Nicholas Lane – trombone
- William Reichenbach – bass trombone
- David Campbell – string, brass, piano, and percussion arrangements
- Larry Corbett – cello
- Suzie Katayama – cello
- Violins:
  - Fernano Moreno
  - Erick Hernandez
  - Diego Casillas
  - Ernesto Molina
  - Joel Derouin
  - Roberto Cani
  - Mario De Leon
  - Peter Kent
  - Josefina Vergara
- "The Coquí of Puerto Rico"

Technical

- Omar Rodríguez-López – producer, director, engineering
- David Campbell – writer, arranger, and conductor of strings and horns
- Jon Debaun – engineering
- Andrew Scheps – engineering
- Dave Schiffman – engineering
- Claudius Mittendorfer – engineering assistant
- Paul Pilsneniks – engineering assistant
- Ross Peterson – engineering assistant
- Howie Weinberg – mastering
- Roger Lian – mastering assistant
- Rich Costey – mixing
- Kristen Welsh – coordinator
- Gary Gersh – A&R
- Chris von Rautenkranz – mastering (vinyl)
- Florian Siller – mastering (vinyl)

Artwork

- Storm Thorgerson – cover, photography
- Peter Curzon – cover, photography
- Dan Abbott – cover
- Bill Thorgerson – cover
- Rupert Truman – photography

== Charts ==
=== Weekly charts ===
Chart (2005)	Peak position
Australian Albums (ARIA)	9
Austrian Albums (Ö3 Austria)	43
Belgian Albums (Ultratop Flanders)	13
Belgian Albums (Ultratop Wallonia)	70
Canadian Albums (Billboard)	6
Dutch Albums (Album Top 100)	34
Finnish Albums (Suomen virallinen lista)	14
French Albums (SNEP)	71
German Albums (Offizielle Top 100)	23
Irish Albums (IRMA)	18
Italian Albums (FIMI)	21
New Zealand Albums (RMNZ)	21
Norwegian Albums (VG-lista)	1
Spanish Albums (Promusicae)	80
Swedish Albums (Sverigetopplistan)	12
Swiss Albums (Schweizer Hitparade)	81
UK Albums (Official Charts)	23
US Billboard 200	4

Chart (2025)	Peak position
Greek Albums (IFPI)	33

=== Year-end charts ===
Chart (2005)	Position
US Billboard 200	173

=== Singles ===
Single	Chart (2005)	Position
"The Widow"	Mainstream Rock Tracks	26
"The Widow"	Modern Rock Tracks	7
"The Widow"	Billboard Hot 100	95
"The Widow"	UK Singles Chart	20

== Certifications ==
Region	Certification	Certified units/sales
United States (RIAA)	Gold	500,000^{^}
^{^} Shipments figures based on certification alone.
