= Live (The Mars Volta EP) =

Live album by The Mars Volta
- Released: 2003
- Recorded: 7 July 2003, Maida Vale Studios; 9 July 2003, Electric Ballroom, London
- Genre: Progressive rock
- Length: 42:29
- Label: Gold Standard Laboratories, Universal, Strummer
- Producer: Omar Rodriguez Lopez, Cedric Bixler-Zavala

The Mars Volta chronology
De-Loused in the Comatorium (2003)	Live (2003)	Frances the Mute (2005)

Professional ratings
Review scores
Source	Rating
Punknews.org	link
Transform Online	(not rated) link

Live is the first officially released live recording from the band The Mars Volta. The EP was released in limited quantities in 2003 and is now difficult to find. Due to this, the EP has become a collector's item among fans. The first two tracks were recorded live at the XFM Studio in London, 2003. The last two tracks were recorded at the Electric Ballroom in London on July 9, 2003.

The jam in "Drunkship of Lanterns" later became part of "Cygnus...Vismund Cygnus" from Frances the Mute.

The album artwork is from the fable of Arachne (also Arachné). Specifically it is from a piece by artist Gustave Doré. It has also been used as the backdrop during the band's live performances.

== Track listing ==
No.	Title	Length
1.	"Roulette Dares (The Haunt of)"	9:29
2.	"Drunkship of Lanterns"	9:38
3.	"Cicatriz ESP"	16:03
4.	"Televators"	7:18

== Australian release ==
The Mars Volta repackaged the live EP and re-released it included with the Tour Edition release of De-Loused in the Comatorium, as well as an Australian-only single for "Televators" in January, 2004, coinciding with their tour with the Big Day Out. It features the studio version of "Televators", and then the same four live tracks.

No.	Title	Length
1.	"Televators" (Album version)	6:18
2.	"Roulette Dares (The Haunt Of)"	9:29
3.	"Drunkship of Lanterns"	9:38
4.	"Cicatriz ESP"	16:03
5.	"Televators"	7:18
