= Tremulant (EP) =

EP by The Mars Volta
- Released: April 2, 2002
- Recorded: October–December, 2001
- Genres: Progressive rock, experimental rock, post-hardcore
- Length: 19:29
- Label: Gold Standard Labs
- Producer: Alex Newport

The Mars Volta chronology
| Tremulant (2002) | De-Loused in the Comatorium (2003) |

Professional ratings
Review scores
| Source | Rating |
|---|---|
| Allmusic | 4/5 stars |
| Drowned in Sound | (9/10) |
| NME | (favorable) |
| Pitchfork Media | (7.0/10) |
| Stylus Magazine | B− |

Tremulant is the debut EP release by progressive rock band The Mars Volta, released on April 2, 2002, on Gold Standard Labs. Produced by Alex Newport, the EP marks the only appearance of founding bassist Eva Gardner until the release of The Mars Volta's self-titled album in 2022. A remastered version of the EP was released on April 16, 2014. It made its digital debut in 2021.

== Recording ==
Regarding the EP's recording sessions, bassist Eva Gardner stated in 2009, "We were in Long Beach somewhere, and it was a really exciting time because it was just this new music. It was a new project for these guys, so they were almost really excited about it. It was great. We did three songs, and it was so fun for me too because it was the first time I had actually been in a more professional... I had done recordings before, but it was just home studios with friends and stuff. This was a more established group. It was fun to be in a professional studio, and to play with really, really great musicians."

== Song information ==
"Concertina", often regarded as the centerpiece of the EP, is rumoured to be a brutal condemnation of Ben Rodriguez, a former bandmate of Cedric and Omar's from At the Drive-In, whom Cedric and Omar regarded as a sociopath. According to interviews conducted with the band, they held Rodriguez responsible for tormenting Julio Venegas to the point where he committed suicide. The band later re-recorded the song alongside "Eunuch Provocateur." (The re-recording of "Concertina" has yet to surface on an official release, however it can be listened to on YouTube).

The backwards vocals at the end of "Eunuch Provocateur" are the lyrics from the song "Itsy Bitsy Spider". Other backwards vocals in the same song can be heard saying "did mommy or daddy ever have to spank you?". These samples come from an old LP the band used that contained children's songs. Other notable lyrics in "Eunuch Provocateur" include the lines, "Dethroned by the comatorium... de-loused by the comatorium", which foreshadow the Mars Volta's debut full-length album, De-Loused in the Comatorium. Additionally, the title of the EP itself is drawn from the concept story of De-Loused in the Comatorium, referring to the "tremulants", creatures that dwell inside the mind of Cerpin Taxt, the main character.

== Track listing ==
| No. | Title | Length |
|---|---|---|
| 1. | "Cut That City" | 5:43 |
| 2. | "Concertina" | 4:54 |
| 3. | "Eunuch Provocateur" | 8:48 |
| Total length: | | 19:29 |

== Production ==
- Recorded in Long Beach, California from October to December 2001.
- Produced by Alex Newport and The Mars Volta.
- Album production design and layout by Sonny Kay and Omar Rodríguez-López.

== Personnel ==
- Omar Rodríguez-López – guitar, percussion, electronics
- Cedric Bixler-Zavala – vocals, percussion
- Ikey Owens – keyboards
- Jeremy Ward – sound manipulation
- Jon Theodore – drums
- Eva Gardner – bass

Technical

- Alex Newport – producer, recording
- The Mars Volta – producer
- Bob Ludwig – mastering
- Chris von Rautenkranz – mastering (vinyl)
- Florian Siller – mastering (vinyl)

Artwork

- Sonny Kay – design, layout
- Omar Rodríguez-López – design, layout
