= De-Loused in the Comatorium =

- Cover art by Storm Thorgerson

Studio album by The Mars Volta
- Released: June 24, 2003
- Recorded: 2002–2003
- Studios: The Mansion, Los Angeles
- Genres: Progressive rock; art rock; post-hardcore; post-rock; alternative rock
- Length: 60:51
- Labels: GSL; Universal; Strummer
- Producers: Rick Rubin; Omar Rodríguez-López

The Mars Volta chronology
Tremulant (2002)	De-Loused in the Comatorium (2003)	Live (2003)

Singles from De-Loused in the Comatorium
- 1. "Inertiatic ESP" Released: September 2003; 2. "Televators" Released: 2004

Alternative cover
- Alternative cover (used as the front cover on vinyl release and certain limited CD editions)

De-Loused in the Comatorium is the debut studio album by the American progressive rock band The Mars Volta, released on June 24, 2003, on Gold Standard Laboratories and Universal Records. Based on a short story written by lead singer Cedric Bixler-Zavala and sound manipulation artist Jeremy Ward, the concept album is an hour-long tale of Cerpin Taxt, a man who enters a week-long coma after overdosing on a mixture of morphine and rat poison. The story of Cerpin Taxt alludes to the death of El Paso, Texas artist Julio Venegas.

Co-produced by Rick Rubin and bandleader/guitarist Omar Rodríguez-López, it is the only studio album to feature founding member Ward, who was found dead of an apparent heroin overdose one month before the album was released. Following the departure of original bassist Eva Gardner, interim bassist Flea of Red Hot Chili Peppers performed on De-Loused.

De-Loused is distinguished by its enigmatic lyrics, Latin and jazz rhythms, and Rodríguez-López's frenetic and dissonant guitar work. The title of the album is taken from the lyrics of the song "Eunuch Provocateur" on the band's Tremulant EP; closing track "Take the Veil Cerpin Taxt", in turn, contains the title of Tremulant. The cover artwork was made by Storm Thorgerson.

The album exemplifies progressive rock, art rock, and post-hardcore while incorporating influences from psychedelic rock, Latin jazz, heavy metal, punk rock, and blues rock.

== Background ==
The Mars Volta started in spring of 2001, soon after the demise of Rodríguez-López's and Bixler-Zavala's previous band At the Drive-In. Intending to break free from the limitations of At the Drive-In and to fulfill his creative vision, Rodríguez-López began to assemble the new group. He first recruited drummer Blake Fleming, whom he first met on tour when Fleming's previous band Laddio Bolocko played with At the Drive-In. Keyboardist Isaiah "Ikey" Owens and sound artist Jeremy Michael Ward from Rodríguez-López's and Bixler-Zavala's dub project De Facto were also asked to join; Owens suggested his friend Eva Gardner (daughter of English musician Kim Gardner) as a bassist. Thus, with Rodríguez-López on guitar and Bixler-Zavala on lead vocals, the first line-up of The Mars Volta was formed. Based in a rented warehouse in Long Beach dubbed Anikulapo (in honor of Nigerian musician Fela Kuti), the band would spend up to 12 hours a day rehearsing and writing material, some of which would eventually end up on De-Loused in the Comatorium. They soon went into to the studio with producer Alex Newport to record two songs, early versions of "Roulette Dares (The Haunt Of)" and "Cicatriz ESP" for a potential single release on Grand Royal. The single never materialized, however, as Grand Royal went bankrupt and drummer Fleming quit the band due to personal differences; a proposed summer European tour also had to be cancelled.

In September 2001, Jon Theodore (of Golden) joined as the new drummer; Theodore's drumming, influenced by the likes of John Bonham, Elvin Jones and Billy Cobham, would become an important backbone to the Mars Volta sound. "I was mesmerized by his deep, spiritual pocket, when playing drums, and his physical beauty", Rodríguez-López later remembered. With Theodore in the lineup, the band finally made its live debut in October and recorded what would be their first official release, the 3-song Tremulant EP; one of the songs, "Eunuch Provocateur", included the lyrics "dethroned by the comatorium, de-loused in the comatorium" which foreshadowed the debut album title. The band's highly energetic and chaotic live shows brought a lot of attention from record companies. After a bidding war, The Mars Volta agreed to a deal with Universal Records via their new imprint Strummer Recordings, which granted them creative freedom as well as providing funding and exclusive vinyl rights for Gold Standard Labs, an indie label co-run by Rodríguez-López through which Tremulant EP was eventually released.

The band spent early 2002 touring in support of Tremulant in the United States, Europe and Japan while continuing to develop material for the future full-length album. However, right after a well-received appearance at the Coachella festival, they would experience a number of setbacks. Gardner, who struggled to cope with the recent death of her father, was forced to leave after committing several "self-destructive acts". Owens was also asked to quit as he, in Rodríguez-López's words, "just wasn't cutting it". Meanwhile, Theodore's commitment to the band was also questioned, as he took a break to reunite with Golden for a brief tour, and Ward was struggling with drug addiction and was forced to enter the rehab under the threat of being fired. Dealing with pressure of holding the band together on the eve of recording their debut album, Rodríguez-López suffered intense panic attacks and acute anxiety disorder, from which he eventually recovered with the help of his parents.

== Inspiration and concept ==
Keeping in line with their original motto for The Mars Volta ("Honour our roots, honor our dead"), Rodríguez-López and Bixler-Zavala envisioned De-Loused in the Comatorium as a concept album inspired by the life and death of their friend Julio Venegas (1972–1996). Venegas was a musician and artist from El Paso, Texas, and some of his surrealist paintings served as inspiration for the lyrics of De-Loused. According to Rodríguez-López, Venegas was "an extreme person. He lived every day getting himself into situations and always getting lost, so he had scars all over his body that let you know the places where he had been". When Venegas's mother died, he tried to kill himself by shooting up morphine but instead went into a coma; after he came out of it, he had trouble using the right side of his body. In 1996, he committed suicide by jumping from an overpass onto the freeway in rush hour traffic. Venegas's death was previously referenced on At the Drive-In song "Embroglio" from their album Acrobatic Tenement.

Rodríguez-López also described Venegas as having "such a profound influence on us, artistically, spiritually and personally", while Bixler-Zavala said his story "was surreal and magical". Seeking to commemorate Venegas, Bixler-Zavala explained that he wanted to "immortalize him on this album", drawing inspiration from narrative concept albums such as SF Sorrow by The Pretty Things and The Lamb Lies Down on Broadway by Genesis. Rodríguez-López saw the future album as "one holistic piece", comparing the album's composition to scoring a film.

The story, which incorporates elements of Venegas's life, follows the fictional character Cerpin Taxt, who falls into a week-long coma after overdosing on a mixture of morphine and rat poison. He subsequently travels through the world of his subconsciousness, inhabited by his paintings; when he wakes up, he decides to take his own life. The complex and abstract writing combined English, Spanish, and multiple invented words. Jeremy Ward played a big role in developing a lyrical lexicon; according to Bixler-Zavala, Ward contributed several words such as "inertiatic", "eriatarka", "comatorium" and "amputechture" (later to be used as a title for the Mars Volta's third album). Along with lyrics, Bixler-Zavala and Ward also wrote a storybook detailing Cerpin Taxt's journey in a form of a novel which would accompany the album.

== Recording and production ==
=== First aborted recordings (Landscape Tantrums) ===
The Mars Volta regrouped in the summer of 2002 with new members Ralph Jasso on bass and Linda Good on keyboards and went into the Mad Dog Studios at Burbank for their initial attempt to record the album. By that time, the songs were mostly complete; in addition to "Roulette Dares", "Cicatriz ESP" and "Inertiatic ESP" which already were live setlist staples, they have recorded new songs "Drunkship of Lanterns", "Eriatarka", "This Apparatus Must Be Unearthed", "Televators", "Take the Veil Cerpin Taxt" and an outtake "A Plague Upon Your Hissing Children". The sessions, produced by Rodríguez-López and engineered by Jon Debaun, reportedly took just four days; however, it was eventually decided to abandon the recordings and to re-record the album from scratch with Rick Rubin co-producing. Some of the 2-track reference mixes from the sessions eventually leaked onto the internet; in 2021, the recordings were re-mixed and officially released under the title Landscape Tantrums (as a stand-alone album and as a part of the boxset La Realidad de Los Sueños). Landscape Tantrums omits "Cicatriz ESP" but includes a mostly instrumental mix of "Take the Veil Cerpin Taxt" (as the lyrics weren't yet completed at the time). In 2024, eight reference mixes from the sessions (including previously unheard versions of "Cicatriz ESP" and "A Plague Upon Your Hissing Children") resurfaced on the Internet Archive.

=== Sessions with Rick Rubin ===
After a short US tour in September-October, the band parted ways with both Jasso and Good, just as the main sessions for De-Loused in the Comatorium were to take place at Rick Rubin's The Mansion studio in Malibu, with Dave Schiffman engineering. Rodríguez-López chose to work with Rubin after a recommendation from Red Hot Chili Peppers guitarist John Frusciante, whom he befriended earlier in the year. Frusciante would contribute guitar and modular synthesizer to "Cicatriz ESP", while his Red Hot Chili Peppers bandmate Flea was brought in by as a temporary bass player, performing on all tracks except "Televators" where Justin Meldal-Johnsen played upright bass. Near the end of the sessions, Rodríguez-López invited Ikey Owens to rejoin the band and record the keyboard parts.

The sessions with Rubin produced a more polished sound compared to Landscape Tantrums versions; in contrast with the band's earlier experimental approach, Rubin encouraged simpler, more accessible arrangements, focusing on the vocals. Rodríguez-López and Bixler-Zavala have expressed mixed feelings about Rubin's production methods over the years. Bixler-Zavala would comment that some of the unique parts of the arrangements were oversimplified and made "very digestible", adding that "[Rubin's] got this thing about representing the common man’s ears — I’d rather jab the common man’s ears". Meanwhile, Rodríguez-López has praised Rubin's Zen-like approach, which helped him to realize "how simple the whole process is when you really break it down once you really let go of all these things that you get hung up on", and acknowledged that Rubin taught him "everything [...] about running a production"; at the same time, he felt that Rubin showed a direction that Rodríguez-López "personally didn't want to be going in". Following De-Loused, Rodríguez-López assumed production duties for all subsequent Mars Volta studio albums, reflecting his desire for greater creative control.

At Rubin's suggestion, the band also attempted to re-record the songs from Tremulant. Only "Concertina" and "Eunuch Provocateur" were completed; "Concertina" remains officially unreleased while "Eunuch Provocateur" was later included on a rare promo CD, before getting a vinyl release in 2021 as a part of La Realidad de Los Sueños boxset, along with the Mansion re-recording of an outtake "A Plague Upon Your Hissing Children", also previously unreleased. Some of the lyrics for "A Plague Upon Your Hissing Children" would be later re-used on "Day of the Baphomets" from Amputechture.

=== Technical aspects ===
Rodríguez-López and Schiffman worked closely together on guitar sounds. Rodríguez-López’s vision was of "a very dense soundscape with a lot of complex parts", for which his live rig (a vintage Ampeg SVT bass amplifier through Marshall cabinet) lacked enough clarity. At Schiffman's suggestion they would instead track guitars through a variety of small combo amps by Supro and Fender, which would better cut through the track. Rodríguez-López also used dozens of effect pedals, often doubling a relatively dry part with the heavily effected one, with two parts then panned hard left and right. Flea played a 1964 Fender Precision Bass through an SVT bass head and 8×10 cabinet; according to Schiffman, the bass needed to be full and present as "the foundation of every track". This resulted in a different bass sound than what Flea usually employed in Red Hot Chili Peppers; Schiffman felt that Flea's talent nevertheless allowed him to fit in perfectly.

== Sound ==
Musically, the album represented a significant expansion of the sound introduced on the band's debut EP. Rodríguez-López drew on progressive rock, punk, jazz fusion, psychedelic rock, and Caribbean, African, and Latin American musical traditions, while Bixler-Zavala had previously described the group's stylistic fusion as "Fela Jehu". The album features complex song structures, syncopated rhythms, extended instrumental passages, ambient interludes and improvisational sections. Rodríguez-López later said the project allowed him to explore a broader musical palette than he had been able to with At the Drive-In, composing the album with "the exacting vision of a movie director".

According to Rodríguez-López, "Roulette Dares" was written while he was still in At the Drive-In and was directly inspired by Le Tigre song "Deceptacon".

== Artwork ==
The album art was created by Storm Thorgerson and Peter Curzon. Physical editions of the album intentionally featured two different covers on either side of the vinyl gatefold/CD booklet; the images were intended to be interchangeable, and had no printed text or logos. The first image featured a Portuguese man o' war with tentacles below the water's surface but a human head above, with tentacles representing the unconscious and the human face representing Cerpin Taxt temporarily surfacing from his coma. The second image represented Cerpin Taxt as an egg-shaped bronze sculpture with a human face, laying on a plate in a hospital setting; the face had the light coming from its mouth as "the cry for help, a shaft of daylight piercing his hospital gloom". The band and Thorgerson supposedly designed the "jellyfish man" side to be the actual front cover, however for the CD release Universal Records chose the "egg head" side, which subsequently became the more widely known cover.

== Pre-release tour and Ward's death ==
While De-Loused in the Comatorium was being prepared for release, The Mars Volta would spend the spring of 2003 touring, playing solo shows as well as supporting Red Hot Chili Peppers on their arena tour. Jason Lader briefly filled in on bass for the European leg of the tour, before they found a permanent replacement in Juan Alderete, formerly of Racer X and Distortion Felix.

The band ended their first leg of the North American tour with Red Hot Chili Peppers with a solo show at the Northsix, New York City on May 21, 2003, where John Frusciante joined them during the encore. This became the last concert played with Jeremy Ward. Several days later, Ward was found dead in his Los Angeles home from an apparent drug overdose. Ward's death deeply shocked the band; a close friend of Rodríguez-López and Bixler-Zavala, he was considered an integral member, who they felt often went unnoticed because he chose to perform offstage. Rodríguez-López has said Ward's loss was "akin to a mutilation", and felt devastated that Ward never got to experience the release of the finished album and its impact. The band subsequently cancelled the June leg of the tour and briefly contemplated their future, ultimately deciding to continue.

== Reception ==
Professional ratings
Aggregate scores
Source	Rating
Metacritic	82/100
Review scores
Source	Rating
AllMusic	4.5/5 stars
Entertainment Weekly	A−
The Guardian	2/5 stars
Los Angeles Times	4/4 stars
NME	9/10
Pitchfork	4.9/10
Q	4/5 stars
Rolling Stone	3/5 stars
Spin	A
The Village Voice	C+

De-Loused became, both critically and commercially, the band's biggest hit, eventually selling in excess of 500,000 copies despite limited promotion, and was featured on several critics' "Best of the Year" lists. The album was ranked number 55 on the October 2006 issue of Guitar World magazine's list of the 100 greatest guitar albums of all time. "Drunkship of Lanterns" was named the 91st best guitar song of all-time by Rolling Stone.

As of February 2007 it had sold 434,000 copies in the United States.

As of June 2016, the album had a score of 82 out of 100 from Metacritic based on "universal acclaim". Alternative Press gave the album a perfect score of all five stars and said it "takes multiple listens to absorb, and, even then, you're probably not going to have a clue to what Bixler's raving about." Yahoo! Music UK gave it a score of eight stars out of ten and said it was "not an album to listen to casually. It insists on taking over your life for an hour, demands a level of concentration rare in rock, amply repays multiple plays." Under the Radar gave the album eight stars out of ten and said that the band "has created the antithesis of ATDI, leaving behind any formula or typicality. What they kept was the fire, the fury, and the passion." Drowned in Sound gave it a score of eight out of ten and called it "truly exquisite and well worth the wait." Playlouder gave it a score of four stars out of five and said, "There are moments of prog rock, jazz fusion and freakydelia in this rush of ideas and if that sounds awful then don't be put off. Instead of the shambolic mess that this kinda influence normally entails Mars Volta have come strictly disciplined." Uncut gave it four stars out of five and said: "Imagine a jam session between King Crimson, Fugazi and '70s Miles. Now imagine it working. That's the Mars Volta." Blender also gave it four stars and said it "Roars like Led Zeppelin, churns like King Crimson and throbs like early Santana." Tiny Mix Tapes likewise gave it a score of four out of five and called it "a very strong debut album for the Mars Volta." Ink 19 Magazine also gave it a favorable review and said it was "definitely worth checking out, but make sure to keep an open mind and check any preconceived notions at the door." Conversely, Brent DiCrescenzo for Pitchfork only gave it 4.9 out of 10, writing that the lyrics were "hilariously awful, sub-Burroughs, refrigerator-magnet montage of dark PSAT words", and that musically, "The Mars Volta mistake sonic piling for complex architecture."

In 2014, readers of Rhythm voted it the ninth-greatest drumming album in the history of progressive rock. The album was also included in the book 1001 Albums You Must Hear Before You Die. The album was included as number 25 on Rolling Stone's list of "50 Greatest Prog Rock Albums of All Time".

== Track listing ==
All lyrics are written by Cedric Bixler-Zavala and Jeremy Ward; all music is composed by Omar Rodríguez-López, except where noted.

No.	Title	Writer(s)	Length
1.	"Son et lumière"		1:35
2.	"Inertiatic ESP"		4:24
3.	"Roulette Dares (The Haunt Of)"		7:31
4.	"Tira me a las arañas" (instrumental)		1:28
5.	"Drunkship of Lanterns"	Rodríguez-López; Bixler-Zavala	7:06
6.	"Eriatarka"		6:20
7.	"Cicatriz ESP"		12:29
8.	"This Apparatus Must Be Unearthed"	Rodríguez-López; Bixler-Zavala	4:58
9.	"Televators"		6:19
10.	"Take the Veil Cerpin Taxt"		8:42
Total length:			60:51

Japanese, UK, and Australian special edition bonus track
No.	Title	Length
11.	"Ambuletz"	7:03

Australian special edition bonus disc (These songs are the same songs that appear on the Live EP)
No.	Title	Length
1.	"Roulette Dares (The Haunt Of)" (live BBC session)	9:29
2.	"Drunkship of Lanterns" (live BBC session)	9:38
3.	"Cicatriz ESP" (live)	16:08
4.	"Televators" (live)	7:18

=== Notes ===
- "Son et lumière" is French for "Sound and Light".
- ESP stands for "Ectopic Shapeshifting Penance-propulsion", as opposed to the traditional "extrasensory perception".
- "Tira me a las arañas" is slightly misspelled Spanish for "Throw Me to the Spiders" (the correct spelling is "Tírame a las arañas").
- "Cicatriz" is Spanish and Portuguese for "Scar".
- "This Apparatus Must Be Unearthed" is a play on a warning frequently found on guitar amplifiers and other electrical equipment: "This Apparatus Must Be Earthed".

== Personnel ==
=== The Mars Volta ===
- Cedric Bixler-Zavala – vocals
- Omar Rodríguez-López – guitar, bass guitar ("Ambuletz")
- Jon Theodore – drums
- Isaiah "Ikey" Owens – keyboards
- Flea – bass guitar (except "Televators" and "Ambuletz")
- Jeremy Ward – effects and sound manipulation

=== Additional musicians ===
- Lenny Castro – percussion
- John Frusciante – additional guitar and synthesizer treatment ("Cicatriz ESP")
- Justin Meldal-Johnsen – double bass ("Televators")

=== Recording personnel ===
- Rick Rubin – producer
- Omar Rodríguez-López – producer
- Dave Schiffman – recording
- Andrew Scheps – additional recording
- Phillip Broussard – assistant engineer, recording engineer
- Darren Mora – assistant engineer
- Rich Costey – mixing engineer
- Jason Lader – mixing engineer ("Ambuletz")
- Lindsay Chase – album production coordination
- Vlado Meller – mastering
- Pete Lyman – mastering (vinyl)
- Steve Kadison – mastering assistance
- Chris von Rautenkranz – mastering (2021 vinyl)
- Florian Siller – mastering (2021 vinyl)

=== Artwork ===
- Storm Thorgerson – cover design, art direction
- Peter Curzon – cover design, graphics
- Rupert Truman – photography
- Robin Laananen – photography (exclusive art print for 2021 vinyl)
- Dan Abbott – illustrations

== Charts ==
Chart (2003)	Peak position
Australian Albums (ARIA)	47
Dutch Albums (Album Top 100)	74
Finnish Albums (Suomen virallinen lista)	26
German Albums (Offizielle Top 100)	47
UK Albums (Official Charts)	43
US Billboard 200	39

Chart (2025)	Peak position
Greek Albums (IFPI)	61

== Certifications ==
Region	Certification	Certified units/sales
Canada (Music Canada)	Gold	50,000^{^}
United Kingdom (BPI)	Silver	60,000^{^}
^{^} Shipments figures based on certification alone.
