= Justin Pearson discography =

This is a discography for the American vocalist and bassist Justin Pearson.

== Struggle ==
=== Compilation albums ===
| Title | Album details |
|---|---|
| One Settler, One Bullet: An Anthology | Released: January 25, 1994; Label: Ebullition; Formats: CD |

=== Extended plays ===
| Title | EP details |
|---|---|
| Struggle. | Released: 1992; Label: Ebullition; Formats: 7-inch |
| Struggle | Released: 19924; Label: Ebullition; Formats: 12-inch |

==== Split extended plays ====
| Title | Other artist | EP details |
|---|---|---|
| Undertow / Struggle. | Undertow | Released: 1992; Label: Bloodlink; Formats: 7-inch |

== Swing Kids ==
=== Compilation albums ===
| Title | Album details |
|---|---|
| Discography | Released: December 10, 1996; Label: Three One G; Formats: CD, LP |

=== Extended plays ===
| Title | EP details |
|---|---|
| Swing Kids | Released: December 6, 1994; Label: Kidney Room, Three One G; Formats: 7-inch |

==== Split extended plays ====
| Title | Other artist | EP details |
|---|---|---|
| Swing Kids / Fly By Wire | Spanakorzo | Released: December 5, 1995; Label: Three One G; Formats: 10-inch |

=== Singles ===
| Year | Title | Album |
|---|---|---|
| 2011 | "Situations On Mars" / "Fake Teeth" | Non-album track |

=== Other appearances ===
| Year | Song | Album |
|---|---|---|
| 1994 | "Disease" | A Food Not Bombs Benefit LP |
| 1998 | "El Camino Car Crash" | Bottlenekk Wholesale Distribution Sampler No. 1 - Fall 1998 |
| 2003 | "Disease" | Queencrust Versus Kiss The Goat |
| 2007 | "El Camino Car Crash" | Three One G 2007 |

== The Locust ==
| Date | Album | Contributions |
|---|---|---|
| 1995 | split with Man Is the Bastard | Vocals and bass |
| December 3, 1996 | split with Jenny Piccolo | Vocals and bass |
| 1997 | The Locust (EP) | Vocals and bass |
| 1998 | The Locust | Vocals and bass |
| 2000 | split with Arab on Radar | Vocals and bass |
| 2001 | Flight of the Wounded Locust | Vocals and bass |
| 2002 | Well I'll Be a Monkey's Uncle | Vocals and bass |
| 2002 | split with Melt-Banana | Vocals and bass |
| 2003 | Follow the Flock, Step in Shit | Vocals and bass |
| June 24, 2003 | Plague Soundscapes | Vocals and bass |
| March 22, 2005 | Safety Second, Body Last | Vocals and bass |
| March 20, 2007 | New Erections | Vocals and bass |
| May 11, 2010 | The Peel Sessions | Vocals and bass |
| July 24, 2012 | Molecular Genetics from the Gold Standard Labs | Vocals and bass |

== The Crimson Curse ==
=== Compilation albums ===
| Title | Album details |
|---|---|
| Greatest Hits | Released: July 3, 2001; Label: Three One G; Formats: CD |

=== Extended plays ===
| Title | EP details |
|---|---|
| Both Feet in the Grave | Released: 1998; Label: Goldenrod, Three One G; Formats: 12-inch |
| Blood Thirsty Lust Rmx EP. | Released: 2005; Label: Coalition; Formats: 12-inch, CD |

==== Split extended plays ====
| Title | Other artist | EP details |
|---|---|---|
| The Festival of Dead Deer / The Crimson Curse | The Festival of Dead Deer | Released: December 7, 1999; Label: Three One G; Formats: 7-inch, 12-inch |

== Holy Molar ==
| Date | Album | Contributions |
|---|---|---|
| December 4, 2001 | Live at the San Diego Metropolitan Correctional Center | Bass |
| February 18, 2003 | The Whole Tooth and Nothing but the Tooth | Bass |
| December 2, 2003 | Holy Molar | Bass |
| 2004 | split with Ex Models | Bass |
| January 9, 2007 | Cavity Search | Bass |

== Some Girls ==
=== Albums ===
==== Studio albums ====
| Title | Album details |
|---|---|
| Heaven's Pregnant Teens | Released: January 24, 2006; Label: Epitaph; Formats: CD, LP |

==== Compilation albums ====
| Title | Album details |
|---|---|
| All My Friends Are Going Death | Released: October 14, 2003; Label: Deathwish; Formats: CD, LP |

=== Extended plays ===
| Title | EP details |
|---|---|
| The Rains | Released: 2002; Label: Deathwish; Formats: 7" |
| The Blues | Released: 2002; Label: Deathwish; Formats: 7" |
| The DNA Will Have Its Say | Released: April 26, 2005; Label: Three One G; Formats: 7", CD |

==== Music videos ====
- "I Need Drugs" (2005)
- "Bone Metal" (2006)
- "Deathface" (2007)

== Head Wound City ==
=== Studio albums ===
| Title | Album details |
|---|---|
| A New Wave of Violence | Released: May 13, 2016; Label: Vice; Formats: LP |

=== Extended plays ===
| Title | EP details |
|---|---|
| Head Wound City | Released: November 8, 2005; Label: Three One G; Formats: CD, 10", 12" |

=== Singles ===
| Title | Year | Album |
|---|---|---|
| "Scraper" | 2016 | A New Wave of Violence |
| “Born To Burn” | 2016 | A New Wave of Violence |
| "Just One Fix" | 2016 | Non-album single |

== All Leather ==
| Date | Album | Contributions |
|---|---|---|
| 2009 | Hung Like a Horse | Vocals |
| 2010 | When I Grow Up, I Wanna Fuck Like a Girl | Vocals |
| 2014 | An Insufficient Apology | Vocals |

== Retox ==
=== Studio albums ===
| Year | Album details |
|---|---|
| 2011 | Ugly Animals: Released: 2011; Label: Ipecac |
| 2013 | YPLL: Released: May 24, 2013; Label: Epitaph |
| 2015 | Beneath California: Released: February 6, 2015; Label: Epitaph |

=== Extended plays ===
| Year | Album details |
|---|---|
| 2011 | Retox: Released: 2011; Label: Ipecac |

==== Split extended plays ====
| Year | Other artist | Album details |
|---|---|---|
| 2014 | Narrows | Narrows / Retox: Released: 2014; Label: Three One G |

=== Music videos ===
- "A Bastard On Father's Day" (2011)
- "Biological Process of Politics" (2013)
- "Let's Not Keep in Touch" (2015)
- "Without Money, We'd All Be Rich" (2015)
- "Die In Your Own Cathedral" (2015)

== Dead Cross ==
=== Studio albums ===
| Year | Album details |
|---|---|
| 2017 | Dead Cross: Released: August 4, 2017; Label: Ipecac, Three One G; Format: CD, LP |
| 2022 | II: Released: 2022; Label: Ipecac, Three One G; Format: CD, LP |

=== Music videos ===
| Year | Title | Artist | Comments |
|---|---|---|---|
| 2017 | Seizure And Desist | Dead Cross | Video by Eric Livingston |
| 2017 | Obedience School | Dead Cross | Video by Dennis Bersales |
| 2017 | Church Of The Motherfuckers | Dead Cross | Video by Michael Panduro |
| 2018 | “My Perfect Prisoner” | Dead Cross | Video by Eric Livingston |
| 2020 | ”Rise Above” | Dead Cross | Video by Displaced/Replaced |
| 2020 | "Skin Of A Redneck" | Dead Cross | Video by Kay Otto |
| 2022 | "Reign Of Error" | Dead Cross | Video by Displaced/Replaced |
| 2022 | "Heart Reformer" | Dead Cross | Video by Dark Details |
| 2022 | "Christian Missile Crisis" | Dead Cross | Video by Displaced/Replaced |

== Planet B ==
| Date | Album | Contributions |
|---|---|---|
| 2015 | Wrong Utopia/Join a Cult | Vocals |
| 2017 | split with Invisibl Skratch Piklz | Vocals |
| 2018 | Planet B | Vocals |
| 2024 | Fiction Prediction | Vocals |

== Deaf Club ==
=== Studio albums ===
| Year | Album details |
|---|---|
| 2022 | Productive Disruption: Released: 2022; Label: Three One G |
| 2025 | We Demand A Permanent State Of Happiness: Released: 2025; Label: Three One G, Southern_Lord_Records |

=== Extended plays ===
| Year | Album details |
|---|---|
| 2019 | Contemporary Sickness: Released: 2019; Label: Three One G |
| 2022 | Bad Songs Forever: Released: 2022; Label: Three One G |

==== Split extended plays ====
| Year | Other artist | Album details |
|---|---|---|
| 2020 | Human Issue | The Wait: Released: 2020; Label: Three One G |
| 2024 | Fuck Club | Split EP: Released: 2024; Label: Three One G Sub Pop |
