= Beautiful Skin =

- Origin: New York City, United States
- Genre: Post-punk/Electronic/Indie
- Years active: 1997–2001
- Label: Gold Standard Laboratories
- Members: Nick Forte; Ross Totino; Mitch Rackin; Charles Burst

Beautiful Skin were an American post-punk band extant from 1997 until their 2001 split. Despite never achieving real mainstream or commercial success, they are regarded by some as a trailblazer for the post-punk revival.

== History ==
Beautiful Skin consisted of guitarist Nick Forte and Brazilian keyboardist Ross Totino. Totino had played with many bands in Brazil in the 1980s, playing covers of post-punk bands like Wire and The Cure at talent shows and parties, while Forte had been a member of U.S. hardcore band Rorschach. The two met while working at an electronics factory in New York; Forte was at the time playing in the band Computer Cougar, who released a single and a posthumous LP on the label Gern Blandsten.

Soon the pair were experimenting together, combining their respective influences into a sound reminiscent of Wire and The Cure, as well as the electronic music of Suicide and OMD, and the krautrock of Can and Kraftwerk. Their debut single, "Sex is a Triangle for the Perfect Square" was followed up by the critically acclaimed Revolve, their debut LP released on Gold Standard Laboratories (GSL). With the addition of Mitch Rackin on bass and Charles Burst on drums, Beautiful Skin toured the west coast in the winter of 2000/2001, supporting labelmates such as The Locust, Le Shok, and De Facto, and split soon after. Various unreleased recordings from the duo and four-piece eras were issued as Everything, All This and More on GSL in 2005. Totino currently lives in Los Angeles, now recording under the name Fans of Collision. Forte also continues to write and record, and produces remixes under various names. Rackin has since played with the bands Dirty Rainbow and Heavy Hands. Burst is a member of The Occasion and also performs with Mike Wexler.

== Members ==
- Nick Forte - Vocals/Guitar (1997–2001)
- Ross Totino - Keyboards (1997–2001)
- Charles Burst - Drums (2000–2001)
- Mitch Rackin - Bass (2000–2001)

== Discography ==
=== Singles ===
- "Sex is a Triangle for the Perfect Square/Work Will Set You Free" - 2000

=== LPs ===
- Revolve - 2000
- Everything, All This and More - 2005
