= Dre Babinski =

American singer-songwriter

- Born: Andrea Caravean Babinski; August 26, 1985 (age 40)
- Occupations: Musician; singer; guitarist; violinist
- Musical career
- Genres: Art rock; indie pop
- Instruments: Vocals; guitar; violin
- Years active: 2006–present
- Labels: Infinite Best Recordings; SideOneDummy Records; Barsuk Records
- Formerly of: Dusty Rhodes and the River Band; Miracle Days
- Website: steadyholiday.com

Andrea Caravean "Dre" Babinski (born August 26, 1985) is a Los Angeles-based singer, songwriter, violinist, and guitarist, best known as the indie-pop solo-act Steady Holiday. Other notable work from Babinski includes recording and touring as violinist and backing vocalist for Dusty Rhodes and the River Band, and as one-half of the musical duo Miracle Days. Dre has also appeared (as Andrea Babinski) in several commercials for web and television, and has worked as a self-described "hired gun" in the band Hunter Hunted, as well as for The Elected, and a solo project from The Honorary Title's Jarrod Gorbel.

== Career ==
=== Dusty Rhodes and the River Band (2006–2011) ===
Dusty Rhodes and the River Band were an indie-rock group from Anaheim, California, fronted by Dustin Apodaca, with Dre Babinski, Kyle Divine, Edson Choi, Eric Chirco, and Brad Babinski (Dre's brother). Their first full-length album First You Live, was produced by Mars Volta keyboardist Isaiah "Ikey" Owens and released on October 19, 2007 on SideOneDummy Records, with the Orange County Register naming it "best album to come out of Orange County in 2007."

Babinski (on backing vocals and violin) performed on two more albums with the band, and toured nationally, playing with acts like Dirty Pretty Things, Brand New, Gogol Bordello, Blind Melon, Flogging Molly, Jonny Lang, Los Lobos, Mofro, Shooter Jennings, and The Aquabats. On June 10, 2011, the band played its final concert at the House of Blues in Anaheim.

=== Miracle Days (2011–2013) ===
Soon after Dusty Rhodes and the River Band disbanded, guitarist Edson Choi relocated to Los Angeles, where he wound up living down the street from Babinski. The two agreed to begin working on a new project together, expecting to release an EP of new music, though the material developed faster than the two originally thought, and their small project blossomed into a full album of songs. With demos in hand, a friend of the duo, who was working as tour manager for the band Dr. Dog at the time, played the touring band a copy of the Miracle Days demos. After hearing the demos, the duo were invited by Dr. Dog to their studio in Philadelphia to record the album.

In October 2011, Babinski joined Choi in the studio with engineer Nathan Sabatino. With only a month of preparation, the duo, so far consisting of an acoustic guitar, a violin, and vocals, had not intended to record the songs with drums, though once they arrived at the studio, members of Dr. Dog all offered to lend their talents to the album. Bass player Toby Leaman, drummer Eric Slick, and frontman Scott McMicken, all joined Babinski and Choi in the studio. Over a two-and-a-half-week period, the duo would solidify the arrangements of the songs into an album that would define Miracle Days as a band.

Though tracking on the album was completed in less than 3 weeks, the band experienced a considerable passing of time before the album's release, due to remixing, and a distribution deal the band opted out of. On October 22, 2013, two years after completing the studio sessions, Miracle Days self-released Something for the Weight on their Bandcamp, and vinyl LP. The title hints at the frustrating length of time between conception and release, and the theme was loosely based on the romanticizing of modern anxiety, as Dre claims the songs are "like stepping into a dream-world where one's worries and fears are something beautiful to behold."

=== Steady Holiday (2015–present) ===
Under the Influence

After Miracle Days parted ways, Babinski toured and recorded as a work for hire, which she felt insulated her from her creative potential, and thus began writing material "in secret" for a new project through which she could fully express herself. In early 2015, Dre began recording sessions for her new solo project Steady Holiday, releasing a video and download for the single Your Version Of Me in November for a future full-length album. At the time of the single's release, Dre was still referring to the forthcoming album under the working title of Getting There. The single was well received and highly praised by fans and critics alike, appearing as Mecca Lecca's "Song of the Day" on November 16, 2016.

After releasing three more singles, and a video in April 2016 for the single Open Water, On June 24, 2016 Babinski released Steady Holiday's debut album, now officially titled Under The Influence, on Brooklyn label Infinite Best Recordings. The album was produced by Gus Seyffert, and features Josh Adams (Jenny Lewis) on drums. Dre described working with Seyffert as an incredible experience, telling a writer that the producer "has such a command over his space...I would have ideas and we were able to capture them in the moment."

Babinski would soon form a live band featuring Brijesh Pandya, Derek Howa and reuniting with brother Brad Babinski, who all came from the band Air Life, and Alina Cutrono, formerly of Alina Bea, and ex-Body Parts. In 2016, the band was hand-picked by Coachella founder Paul Tollet to play the festival, where they performed both weekends on the Gobi Stage. Soon after playing Coachella, the band would play a residency at Silver Lake venue The Satellite in support of the album.

In October, 2016, Steady Holiday was awarded the title "Best Solo Artist" in LA Weekly. In December 2016, Steady Holiday's Under The Influence LP was placed in the top 100 "best albums of 2016" on Bandcamp.

Nobody's Watching

On August 24, 2018, Steady Holiday released Nobody's Watching on Barsuk Records, marking Babinski's 2nd LP as Steady Holiday.

Take the Corners Gently

On October 16, 2020, Steady Holiday released Living Life, the first single from Take the Corners Gently, a new LP due February 2021 and produced by Blake Sennett. Described by Dre as possibly being "the most straightforward song I’ve written..." Living Life was released in conjunction with a video of the same name, and was characterized as "an anthem for not only living in the moment, but accepting the value in it" that falls "somewhere between a slowed-down 'Mr. Brightside' and the Twin Peaks theme," with NPR believing it draws inspiration from A Day in the Life by The Beatles. Living Life appeared on NPR's All Songs Considered in October 2020.

In November 2020, Steady Holiday released Tangerine, the second single from Take the Corners Gently, along with a music video and a short film. Babinski reflects on the song's meaning as "a song about mental illness — about witnessing someone’s behavior change without warning...and I’m still learning how to understand it. Sometimes that’s easier to do with abstractions. Like turning a difficult subject into a fruit..."

=== Other work ===
Between tours and recording sessions, Babinski has taken on small roles in film and television. Her screen work includes appearances in several music videos, and multiple commercials for products from Subway, Panera, Acura, QuickBooks, and Miller High Life.

== Style and influences ==
Babinski's music is described by Billboard as having "sweet, sometimes sad melodies". The band has been compared to Portishead, and Stereolab, though Dre has described her influences as ranging from Leonard Cohen and Burt Bacharach, to the films of John Cassavetes and Gena Rowlands.

Often regarded for her visual style as well as her musical efforts, a spokesperson for Ford Modeling Agency has referred to Babinski's Instagram profile as having "fantastic taste". Babinski explains that her fashion is influenced by Ty Dolla $ign, and when composing imagery, prefers to be placed into "otherworldly" and "intricate" scenery.

== Personal life ==
Babinski has been described by herself and others as having a "self-deprecating sense of humor", and in interviews has expressed difficulty in taking ownership of her success, and concern about the stress of her "own neuroses". Crediting her turnaround to a "personal evolution", Dre has since began taking her health seriously, and focusing on her relationships and awareness. While discussing Steady Holiday's Coachella performance, she tells a writer for Amy Poehler's Smart Girls, that in regards to her former outlook on life, "I wish someone would have thrown a bucket of water on me and explained that the ‘tortured artist’ cliche is just that."
