= Ikey Owens =

American keyboardist (1974–2014)

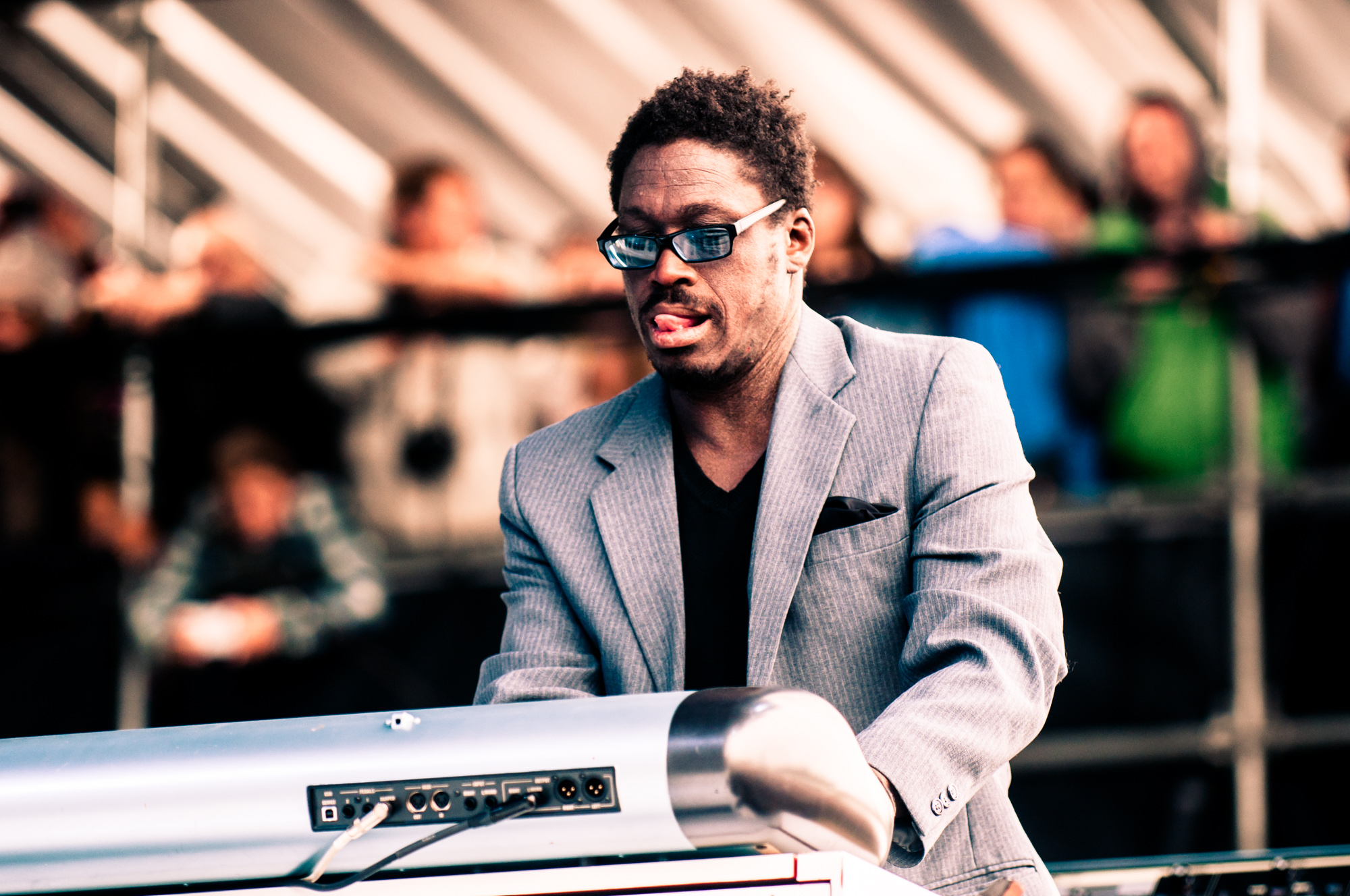
- Owens performing in 2012

Background information
- Born: Randolph Isaiah Owens; December 1, 1974
- Origin: Long Beach, California, U.S.
- Died: October 14, 2014 (aged 39) Cholula, Puebla, Mexico
- Genres: Progressive rock; experimental rock; jazz; neo-psychedelia; hip-hop; dub; electronica; reggae; ska
- Occupations: Musician; producer
- Instruments: Keyboards; piano; organ; synthesizers; guitar; drums; melodica; clavinet; effects pedals
- Years active: 1994–2014

Randolph Isaiah "Ikey" Owens (December 1, 1974 – October 14, 2014) was an American multi-instrumentalist and producer, known primarily for his work as a keyboardist. Owens also played piano, organ, synthesizers, guitar, drums, melodica, clavinet, and effects pedals. Recognized for his tenure with The Mars Volta, Jack White, De Facto, and Free Moral Agents, he also played in and produced an array of bands from the Long Beach and Denver music scenes.

== Biography ==
Ikey Owens was a member of a number of local, Californian ska, punk, and reggae bands in the early to late 1990s such as Reel Big Fish, The Aquabats, One Eye Open, Slightly Stoopid, and The Hippos. He started the ska band Pocket Lent with his brother, Aaron Owens, in Southern California which attracted a cult following in the local area. The funk-reggae-jazz fusion group released their first EP in 1994. Owens had two brothers, both of which were also musicians. He also performed as a member of Long Beach Dub Allstars, which featured members of Sublime.

In a 2024 tribute post on Instagram, previous collaborator Cedric Bixler-Zavala stated that Owens walked up to him and his band at a party in Long Beach and Owens plugged in his keyboard and amp. Bixler-Zavala claimed that's how they "basically" met. Furthermore, in 1998, an encounter with Cedric Bixler-Zavala and Omar Rodríguez-López of At the Drive-In at a concert in Irvine proved to be fateful. In 1999, Owens lost his job at a financial management firm in Huntington Beach that "helped handle billion-dollar accounts for Disney and the Catholic Church," but he eventually received an invitation to join the dub reggae band De Facto, replacing Ralph Jasso. He began touring Europe with Rodríguez-López, Bixler-Zavala, and Jeremy Ward shortly thereafter. Owens would contribute to three De Facto EPs and one studio album. One notable performance came on January 3, 2001, at The Smell in Los Angeles which was eventually released by the band as a live DVD. Ward's melodica and vocals and Owens' keyboard were at the forefront of De Facto's sound.

After At the Drive-In broke up, Owens was invited to join Rodríguez-López and Bixler-Zavala's new project, The Mars Volta. A founding member, Owens was one of the longest tenured members of The Mars Volta having continually recorded and performed with the band since their 2001 inception (with the exception of a few months in 2002) through the majority of 2010. The Mars Volta shows during this period were characterized by their high-energy, frenetic performances, due in some part to Owens' keyboard playing and "controlled chaos." He, along with the rest of The Mars Volta, won a Grammy award in February 2009 for Best Hard Rock Performance for Wax Simulacra. He was not asked by Rodriguez-Lopez to accompany the band on their 2011 summer tour. Reasons for the decision are speculative, although on July 2, 2011, then-current Mars Volta bassist Juan Alderete claimed that Owens was currently "producing bands these days." Alderete later noted, "He had some conflicts in his scheduling, and then it all just naturally evolved into what it is today. Ikey is awesome. I miss dinners with him."

Owens was also quite active outside of The Mars Volta. Beginning in 2002, Owens wrote and recorded solo material under the moniker Free Moral Agents, releasing a vinyl-only EP on Pete Records, as well as a GSL split 12-inch with Subtitle. They released their full-length Everybody's Favorite Weapon in 2004. Momma's Gun Club Vol. 1, their second record, was released in 2006. Free Moral Agents released their third full-length album Control This in the fall of 2010, the first album with the group's expanded line-up. Chaine Infinie Plus was their fourth and last studio album. Owens was active with Free Moral Agents until his death in 2014.

Along with Pocket Lent, he played with Teen Heroes and did session work and/or live shows with Sublime, El-P, Run the Jewels, Dave Sitek from TV on the Radio, Shuggie Otis, Blowfly, Barrington Levy, Mastodon, Gravy Train!!!!, Born Jamericans, Wailing Souls, Radioinactive, Heavens, Prefuse 73, Bob Forrest, MIJA, poet/spoken word artist Saul Williams, and many other bands. He also served as Lauryn Hill's band director for a time.

Owens worked with 2Mex to form the band Look Daggers in 2006. He produced and was responsible for the music in the hip-hop group, while 2Mex was responsible for the vocals. Owens described the band as a "new outlet" for himself while 2Mex stated that working with Ikey changed his musical direction.

In 2007, Ikey produced First You Live by Orange County progressive-folk band Dusty Rhodes and the River Band. Owens was also seen playing with the Long Beach experimental band Crystal Antlers. In 2010, in demonstrating his versatility, Owens was pulled from the crowd of Spaceland in Los Angeles by Money Mark and the two performed a keyboard solo before Ikey departed back into the crowd. He also contributed to the album Disfrutalo! by Disfrutalo!. Owens produced, mixed, mastered, and performed on the record. When the band had gathered the artwork and was ready to release it, Owens passed away. The psychedlic rock album features the keyboardist on the track Dreamtime.

Owens later became part of Jack White's all-male backup band The Buzzards, playing keyboards, organ, and piano. He took part in the world tour in support of White's album Blunderbuss, and later performed on White's second album, Lazaretto. Owens played on the title track of the album and is featured in the music video. "Lazaretto" won a Grammy for Best Rock Performance in 2015. He was in the middle of the supporting tour of the album at the time of his death.

Owens produced and performed with a prolific number of local Californian and Denver bands, including his own groups and solo material. His second studio album, which he completed shortly before his death, was finally released in 2024 with the help of his friends and former bandmates. The record, eponymously titled Ikey Owens, is owned by Unit E Records and features seven tracks. The solo album was previously disseminated among musicians and friends under different versions, but the definitive track listing was eventually discovered in emails and files. However, its release would have to wait another ten years due to challenges among those involved in the project.

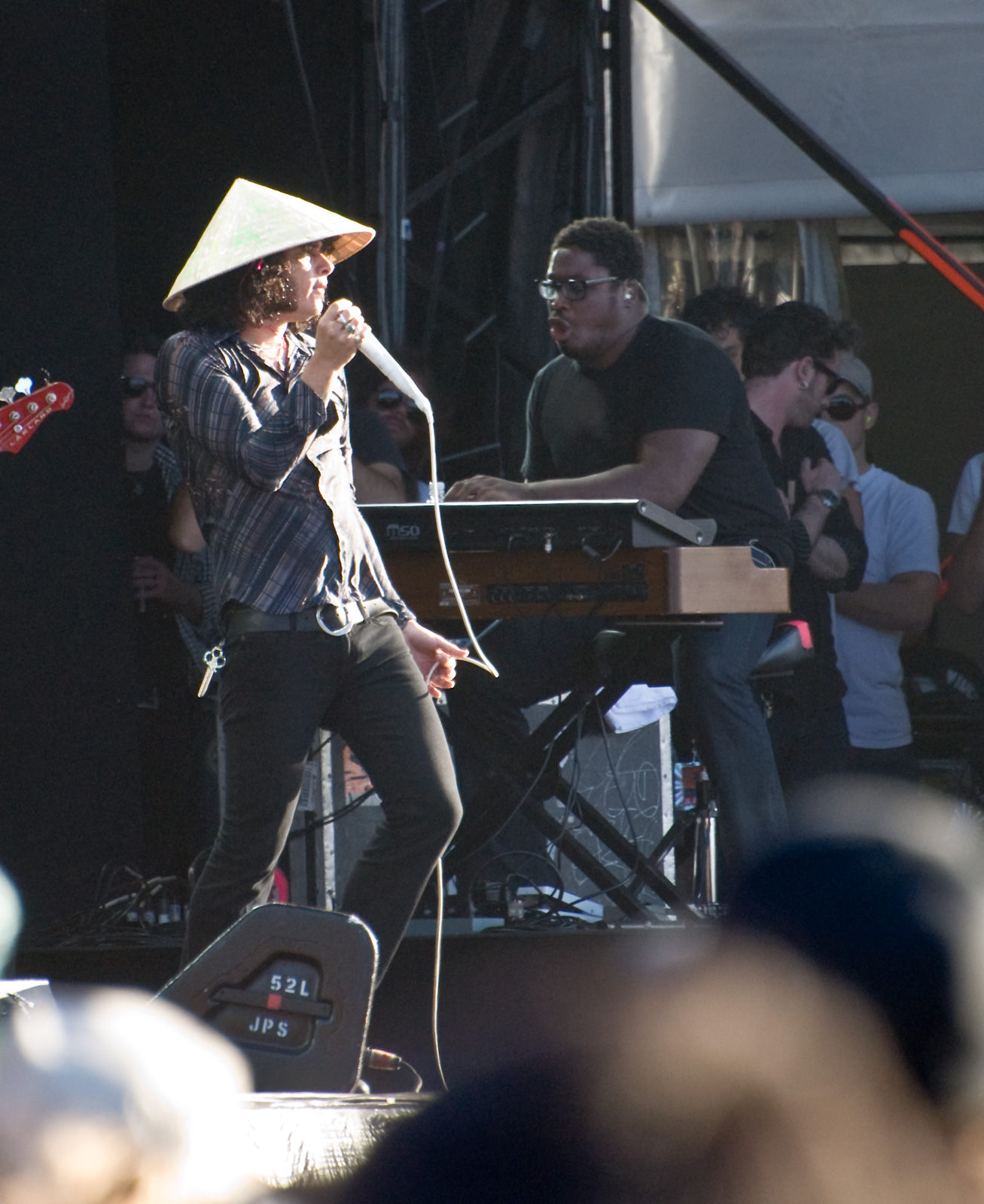
Owens, right, at Big Day Out in 2010 with The Mars Volta

== Death ==
On October 14, 2014, Owens was found dead due to a heart attack in his hotel room in Puebla, Mexico, aged 39. Two remaining concerts in Mexico in support of Jack White's album, Lazaretto, were cancelled. The band had played in Mexico City three days earlier, in Puebla one night before the incident, and were scheduled to perform in Guadalajara the day of his death. Pearl Jam would honor Owens with a performance of their 2000 single "Light Years" on October 16, 2014, in Detroit. Jack White dedicated his November 19th show of the same year and specifically the song "Love Interruption" to Owens.

== Discography ==
=== Solo ===
- Looking for Lauryn Hill In Lakewood as Isaiah Ikey Owens (July 27, 2010, as download on iTunes)
- The Magic of We (2018)
- Ikey Owens (2024)

=== With De Facto ===
- How Do You Dub? You Fight For Dub, You Plug Dub In EP (2001)
- 456132015 EP (2001)
- Megaton Shotblast LP (2001)
- Légende du Scorpion à Quatre Queues LP (2001)

=== With Free Moral Agents ===
- Lay Down (2003)
- Subtitle / Free Moral Agents – Leave Home / Instinctively Intact (2004)
- Everybody's Favorite Weapon (2004)
- The Special 12 Singles Series (2005)
- Momma's Gun Club Vol. 1 (2006)
- Looking for Lauryn Hill in Lakewood (2007)
- Free Moral Agents (2008)
- "North Is Red" (single) (2009)
- Control This formerly The Honey in the Carcass of the Lion (2010)
- Live At The Prospector (2010)
- Free Moral Agents / Mainey Wilson – Aravand / Veiled Visions (2011)
- Majestic Soundsystem (Live At Low End Theory) (2013)
- Chaine Infinie (2013)
- Chaine Infinie Plus (2014)

=== With The Harms ===
- She Turns (2014)

=== With Jack White ===
- Live At Third Man Records (2012)
- Live In New York 2012 (2013)
- Lazaretto (2014)
- Live From Bonnaroo 2014 (2014)
- Acoustic Recordings 1998-2016 (2016)
- Live at the Masonic Temple (2021)
- Jack White / Witch / Dinosaur Jr. / Mudhoney – Third Man Live (2024)

=== With Look Daggers ===
- That Look – EP (2006)
- The Patience – EP (2007)
- Suffer in Style – LP (2008)

=== With The Mars Volta ===
- Tremulant – EP (2002)
- De-Loused in the Comatorium – LP (2003)
- Live – EP (2003)
- Frances the Mute – LP (2005)
- Scabdates – LP (2005)
- Amputechture – LP (2006)
- The Bedlam in Goliath – LP (2008)
- Octahedron – LP (2009) (credited but did not actually play on the album)
- La Realidad De Los Sueños – boxset (2021)

=== With MIJA ===
- Jeminism II – EP (2011)

=== With Milk+ ===
- Venus Breakdown (2012)
- Band On Wire (2013)

=== With Omar Rodríguez-López ===
- A Manual Dexterity: Soundtrack Volume 1 (2004)
- Arañas en La Sombra (2016)

=== With Philieano ===
- Holy Homework (2007)

=== With Pocket Lent ===
- Pocket Lent (1994)
- What's Left? (1995)
- Verve (1996)

=== With Rubedo ===
- Massa Confusa (2012)
- Love Is The Answer (2013)

=== With Various Blonde ===
- Summer High (2014)

=== Guest appearances ===
- Reel Big Fish – Turn the Radio Off (1996)
- Other Cuts – Other Cuts (1997)
- The Aquabats – The Fury Of The Aquabats!
- The Hippos – Forget the World (1997)
- Sublime – Second-hand Smoke (1997)
- Various artists – Take Warning: The Songs Of Operation Ivy (1997)
- 22 Jacks – Overserved (1998)
- Various artists – The Radiolistener Remixes (1998)
- Teen Heroes – Audio Satellite (1998)
- Various artists – Songs For The Brokenhearted (1999)
- Five Eight & Clemente – The Kids Wanna Rock Revival (1999)
- Pseudopod – Pseudopod (2002)
- Gravy Train!!!! – Hello Doctor (2003)
- Nobody – Pacific Drift - Western Water Music Vol. 1 (2003)
- The Free Design – Redesigned Vol. 2 (2004)
- Saul Williams – Black Stacey (2004)
- Saul Williams – Saul Williams (2004)
- Radioinactive & Antimc – Free Kamal (2004)
- The Perceptionists – The Razor (2005)
- Z-Trip – Shifting Gears (2005)
- Slightly Stoopid – Closer To The Sun (2005)
- Coaxial – The Phantom Syndrome (2005)
- Various artists – Definitive Jux Teaser 2005 (2005)
- The Free Design – The Now Sound Redesigned (2005)
- Various artists – Look At All The Love We Found: A Tribute To Sublime Live (2006)
- Nobody – Revisions Revisions: The Remixes 2000-2005 (2006)
- Mastodon – Blood Mountain (2006)
- DJ Nobody – Revisions Revisions: The Remixes 2000–2005 (2006)
- Nobody & Mystic Chords Of Memory – Tree Colored See... (2006)
- Bob Forrest – Modern Folk And Blues Wednesday (2006)
- Heavens – Patent Pending (2006)
- The Visionaries – We Are The Ones (We've Been Waiting For) (2006)
- Existereo & Deeskee – Hopeless Crooks With Open Books (2006)
- The Jai-Alai Savant – Flight of the Bass Delegate (2007)
- Busdriver – RoadKillOvercoat (2007)
- El-P – I'll Sleep When You're Dead (2007)
- Saul Williams –The Inevitable Rise and Liberation of NiggyTardust! (2007)
- Good Charlotte – Greatest Remixes (2008)
- Toko Tasi – Spiritual Life (2008)
- Mestizo – U May Not Heard This (2008)
- The Valley Arena – We Died (2009)
- Deeskee & Escape Artists – For The Birds (2009)
- Reason To Rebel – Imaginary Foe (2009)
- Greater California – All The Colors (2009)
- Kasio Kristmas – Kasio Kristmas (2009)
- Maximum Balloon – Maximum Balloon (2010)
- Free the Robots – Ctrl Alt Delete (2010)
- Knives And Gasoline – Love Songs For Crime Scenes (2011)
- Crystal Antlers – Two-Way Mirror (2011)
- Vice Cooler – Lost In A Dream (2011)
- Slightly Stoopid – Everything You Need (2012)
- El-P – Cancer 4 Cure (2012)
- Mother's Cake – Creation's Finest (2012)
- Maximum Hedrum – Synthesize (2012)
- Brittany Howard & Ruby Amanfu – I Wonder (2013)
- Run The Jewels – Run The Jewels (2013)
- Chris Schlarb – Psychic Temple II (2013)
- J. Roddy Walston & The Business – Essential Tremors (2013)
- Wild Pack Of Canaries – Agua Amarga (2013)
- Ape Machine – Mangled By The Machine (2013)
- Rival Sons – Great Western Valkyrie (2014)
- Buzzmutt – Strange Planes of Surveillance (2014)
- Mastodon – Once More 'Round the Sun (2014)
- Kelis – Food (2014)
- Miss Shevaughn & Yuma Wray – Lean Into The Wind (2014)
- Beck – Song Reader (2014)
- Run The Jewels – Run The Jewels 2 (2014)
- Midnight Masses – Departures (2014)
- Disfrutalo! – Disfrutalo! (2014)
- Perro Bravo – Three On The Tree + Smoking Scorpion Tales (2015)
- Perro Bravo – Costa Mix 2015 (2015)
- Existereo & Paris Zax – Dirt Road Holiday (2015)
- Quantic Presenta Flowering Inferno – 1000 Watts (2016)
- Various artists – Herd's Tha Werd Vol.1 (2017)
- The Ascent Of Everest – Is Not Defeated (2019)
- Mastodon – Medium Rarities (2020)
- 2Mex – Sound Hording Volume 3 (2020)
- 2Mex – Ghostwriting Songs For God (2021)

=== As producer ===
- Bank Of Brian – Leave Your Flaws At Home (1998)
- Various artists – The Radiolistener Remixes (1998)
- Gravy Train!!! – Hello Doctor (2003)
- Free Moral Agents – Everybody's Favorite Weapon (2004)
- Subtitle / Free Moral Agents – Leave Home / Instinctively Intact (2004)
- Free Moral Agents – The Special 12 Singles Series (2005)
- Look Daggers – The Patience EP (2007)
- Dusty Rhodes & The River Band – First You Live (2007)
- Look Daggers – Suffer in Style (2008)
- Free Moral Agents – Free Moral Agents (2008)
- Mode – A Future to Kill the Habits on the Witch's Tongue (2008)
- Crystal Antlers – EP (2008)
- Deeskee & Escape Artists – For The Birds (2009)
- Greater California – All The Colors (2009)
- Free Moral Agents – Control This (2010)
- 2Mex – My Fanbase Will Destroy You (2010)
- Wolf Magic – Family (2010)
- Wolf Magic – Wolf Magic (2011)
- Crystal Antlers – Two-Way Mirror (2011)
- MIJA – Jeminism II (2011)
- The Terrapin – Innermachine (2011)
- Meladora – Houses of Joy (2011)
- Mode – Store Bought Roses (2011)
- Chase Frank – Smile Trials (2011)
- Melvoy – Midnight Makeup (2011)
- Boyfrndz – Boyfrndz (2011)
- Ape Machine – War To Head (2011)
- Rubedo – Massa Confusa (2012)
- Holophrase – Horizons of Expectation (2012)
- True Aristocrats – Mary Amygdala (2012)
- Milk+ – Venus Breakdown (2012)
- Wild Pack Of Canaries – In The Parian Flesh (2013)
- Ape Machine – Mangled By The Machine (2013)
- Rubedo – Love Is The Answer (2013)
- Milk+ – Band on Wire (2013)
- Wild Pack Of Canaries – Agua Amarga (2013)
- Boyfrndz – Natures (2013)
- The Harms – She Turns (2014)
- Various Blonde – Summer High (2014)
- BLXPLTN – Black Cop Down (2014)
- Buzzmutt – Strange Planes of Surveillance (2014)
- MMXV – SoCal Tennis Pros (2014)
- Disfrutalo! – Disfrutalo! (2014)
- Rudy De Anda – Ostranenie (2015)
- Wheelchair Sports Camp – No Big Deal (2016)
- Ikey Owens – Ikey Owens (2024)
