= De facto (disambiguation) =

De facto is a Latin expression that means "by [the] fact".

De Facto may also refer to:

- De Facto (band), a dub reggae band
- De Facto (De Facto album), 1999
- De Facto (Marčelo album), 2003
- DeFacto (retailer), a retail clothing chain based in Turkey
- SS Defacto
