= Megaton Shotblast =

¡Megaton Shotblast!

Studio album by De Facto
- Released: July 31, 2001
- Recorded: El Paso, Texas, 2000 & March 2001
- Genres: Electronica, dub, reggae
- Length: 55:06
- Label: Gold Standard Laboratories

De Facto chronology
456132015 (2001)	¡Megaton Shotblast! (2001)	How Do You Dub? You Fight for Dub, You Plug Dub In (2001)

Professional ratings
Review scores
Source	Rating
Kerrang!	1/5 stars

¡Megaton Shotblast! is the debut album by American dub reggae band De Facto. Largely instrumental, the album pulls influence from various genres, including electronica, dub, reggae, and jazz.

== Track listing ==
No.	Title	Length
1.	"Manual Dexterity"	2:20
2.	"Cordova" (Live)	10:07
3.	"El Professor Contra De Facto"	4:53
4.	"Fingertrap"	3:10
5.	"Descarga De Facto" (Live)	8:09
6.	"Mitchel Edward Klik Enters A Dreamlike State... And It's Fucking Scandalous"	4:23
7.	"Thick Vinyl Plate" (Live)	6:42
8.	"Coaxial"	7:08
9.	"Simian Cobblestone"	4:19
10.	"Rodche Defects"	3:55
Total length:		55:06

== Personnel ==
- Omar Rodríguez-López - bass
- Cedric Bixler-Zavala - drums
- Isaiah Ikey Owens - keyboards
- Jeremy Ward - melodica, sound manipulation
- Alberto "El Professor" Aragonez - percussion (3, 10)
- Ralph Dominique Jasso - keys (3)
- Eric Salas - percussion (3)
- David Lopez - trumpet (4, 10)
- Gabe Gonzalez - piano (9)
- Ángel Marcelo Rodríguez-Cheverez - vocals (10)
