= We Are Electrocution =

Studio album by Le Shok
- Released: 2000
- Recorded: 1999
- Genres: Punk rock, new wave
- Length: 14:37
- Label: GSL

Professional ratings
Review scores
Source	Rating
Allmusic	link
Maximumrocknroll	Positive September 2000
Razorcake	Positive link

We are Electrocution is the debut album by nihilistic new wave punk rock band Le Shok released in 2000 on GSL. Initially available only in limited quantities on vinyl, a CD was released the following year. The album garnered inclusion on the Village Voice critics Pazz & Jop list for 2000.

== Track listing ==
1. "I Know You're Ready" – :57
2. "Killed by Fuck" – 1:19
3. "Where's the Line Begin for Vicodin?" – :49
4. "Blend the Quick with the Slow" – 1:17
5. "White Tie, You Die" – :34
6. "Give Me Something Help Me Please" – :43
7. "TV in My Eye" – 1:57
8. "Brett Cutts (Himself)" – :41
9. "We Are Electrocution" – :53
10. "Fade in, Fade Out" – 1:31
11. "They Call Her Action" – 1:11
12. "Mind Your Own Business" – 1:26
13. "Do the Dramatic" – 1:19
