= Kapow Records =

American record label

- Founded: 2000
- Country of origin: United States
- Location: Orange County, California

Kapow Records is a record label that was founded in 2000 in Orange County, California. It later relocated to Los Angeles in early 2005.

== Discography ==
- Kapow #1 The Starvations Church Of The Double Cross 7"
- Kapow #2 Throw Rag Bag Of Glue 7"
- Kapow #3 Cavity Miscellaneous Recollections 92-97 CD
- Kapow #4 Le Shok LA To NY 6"
- Kapow #5 The Catheters It Can't Stay This Way (Forever) 7"
- Kapow #6 The Stitches Four More Songs From The Stitches 12"EP
- Kapow #6 The Stitches Five More Songs From The Stitches CDEP
- Kapow #7 Alleged Gunmen Audio Invasion 7"
- Kapow #8 The Starvations One Long Night CDEP
- Kapow #9 Rolling Blackouts Add Vice 7"
- Kapow #10 The Orphans (band) Chinatown 7"
- Kapow #11 Lipstick Pickups Better Than You 7"
- Kapow #12 Street Trash 12"EP
- Kapow #14 Killer Dreamer Survival Guns 7"
- Kapow #15 Alleged Gunmen Return To Zero LP/CD
- Kapow #16 The Dirtbombs Merit 7"
- Kapow #17 Killer Dreamer Killer Dreamer LP/CD
- Kapow #18 The Leeches Integratron 7"
- Kapow #19 Thee Make-Out Party! Wreckless Epic 7"
- Kapow #20 CCT Incommunicado CDEP
- Kapow #21 Almighty Do Me A Favor Wont Be None 7"
- Kapow #22 The Red Onions I Want Your Love 7"
- Kapow #23 Almighty Do Me A Favor ADMF CD
- Kapow #24 Lipstick Pickups Domesticated Animals LP

== See also ==
- List of record labels
