= 456132015 =

EP by De Facto
- Released: March 19, 2001
- Genre: Electronica, dub, reggae
- Length: 12:44
- Label: Grand Royal
- Producer: Mario Caldato Jr.

De Facto chronology
De Facto (1999)	456132015 (2001)	¡Megaton Shotblast! (2001)

456132015 is the second EP by American dub-reggae band De Facto, released on March 1, 2001, through Grand Royal in Europe only. It is often considered as the band's first official release, as their debut De Facto was only available as a very limited pressing.

The EP, recorded by Robert Carranza and produced and mixed by Mario Caldato Jr., is notable for its clean production and more polished sound compared to other De Facto recordings which were mostly made at members' home studios. It is also the band's most vocal-heavy release, and the only one to feature Cedric Bixler-Zavala lead vocals (on "120E7"). Alternate versions of "120E7" and "Vesica Pisces" would be later released on De Facto's second LP, Légende du Scorpion à Quatre Queues.

The title is a coded message using numbers and the corresponding letter of the English alphabet; it spells "DEFACTO" (4=D, 5=E, 6=F, 1=A, 3=C, 20=T, 15=O).

The EP was to be followed by a full-length LP also recorded with Caldato Jr., tentatively titled Black Hot Chrome. The album was shelved when Grand Royal went bankrupt the same year and remains unreleased to this day. Band members subsequently focused their efforts on a new project, The Mars Volta.

== Track listing ==
No.	Title	Length
1.	"120E7"	4:33
2.	"Vesica Pisces"	4:24
3.	"120E7" (dub version)	3:47

== Personnel ==
- Omar Rodríguez-López – bass, backing vocals (1, 3), percussion, artwork
- Cedric Bixler-Zavala – drums, vocals (1, 3), percussion
- Isaiah Ikey Owens – keyboards
- Jeremy Ward – sound manipulation, melodica, vocals
