= That Woman's Got Me Drinking =

That Woman's Got Me Drinking may refer to:

- "That Woman's Got Me Drinking", a song by Shane MacGowan from the 1994 album The Snake
- "That Woman's Got Me Drinking", a song by The Stitches from the 1995 album 8x12
