= The Stitches =

American punk rock band

- Origin: Orange County, California, U.S.
- Genres: Punk rock
- Years active: 1994 - present
- Members: Mike Lohrman; Johnny Witmer; Pete Archer; Craig Barker; Jim Kaa
- Past members: Johnny Sleeper; Logan Graham; Eddie Gaxiola

The Stitches is an American 1970s-style punk rock band formed in 1994 in Orange County, California, United States. The Stitches record on independent labels such as Disaster, Gold Standard Laboratories, Vinyl Dog, Suburbia, TKO, and Kapow.

== Discography ==
The current discography of The Stitches as of August 14, 2023.

=== Albums ===
- 8x12 (1995)
- 12 Imaginary Inches (2002)
- You Better Shut Up and Listen (Live Album on Picture Disc)(2002)
- Live @ Der Weinerschnitzel 2003 DVD (2010)
- Unzip My Baby...All 7 inches (collection of all 7"s on 1 LP) (Wanda Records- 2013)

=== EPs ===
- 4 More Songs from the Stitches
- 5 More Songs from the Stitches
- Do The Jetset (2011 Vinyl Dog)
- D- Demos 7" (2013 Modern Action Records)

=== Singles ===
- "V/A You Know It's a Product..." (1994)
- "Sixteen" / "Something New" (1994)
- "Two New Cuts" (1995)
- "Sixteen" / "Heaven" (1995)
- "Talk Sick" (1997)
- "2nd Chance" (1997)
- "Living' at 110" (1997)
- "You Tear Me Out" (1997)
- "Cars of Today" split w/Le Shok (1999)
- "Automatic" (2002)
- "Monday Morning Ornaments" (2010)
- "Split w/ The Gaggers" (2013)
- "Split w/ Miscalculations" (2014)

=== Compilations ===
- It Smells Like Spring (1997)
- Old Skars And Upstarts (1998) (includes "Livin’ At 110")
- Viva la Vinyl Vol. No. 3 (1999) (includes "I Just Wanna Fuck")
- A Fistful Of Rock-N-Roll Vol. No. 3 (2000) (includes "My Baby Hates Me")
- Punch Drunk III (2001) (includes "Cars Of Today")
- Old Skars And Upstarts 2001 (2001) (includes "Pick Me Up")
- Old Skars And Upstarts 2002 (2002) (includes "Electroshock Carol")
- The L.A. Shakedown (2003) (includes "Automatic")
- Punch Drunk V (includes "Better Looks (When You're Dead)") (2004)
- A Tale Of Rotten Orange (2010) (includes "Monday Morning Ornaments")
