= The Grand Elegance =

American psychedelic blues band from California

The Grand Elegance is an American psychedelic blues band from Long Beach, California formed in 1997.

== Personnel ==
- Vocals—Warren Thomas (The Abigails (Burger Records))
- Guitar—Kyle Mullarky (The Abigails, The Shore, Starlite Desperation)
- Keyboards—Chris Badger (VUM, Everlovely Lightningheart (Hydrahead Records))
- Drums—Anthony Matarazzo (Some Days, FM Bats, Jail Weddings)
- Guitar—Orlando Sanchez (FM Bats, Parade's End, I'm Gonna Stab You)

== Discography ==
=== Singles & EP's ===
- (2000) - Vicious Circles (EP) (Prime Directive Records)
- (2002) - The Sex (single) (Prime Directive Records)

=== Albums ===
- (2006) - Warm Summer Nights (The Weather Machine, Prime Directive Records)
- (2009) "Cold Winter Dreams"
