= Dusty Rhodes and the River Band =

American indie rock band

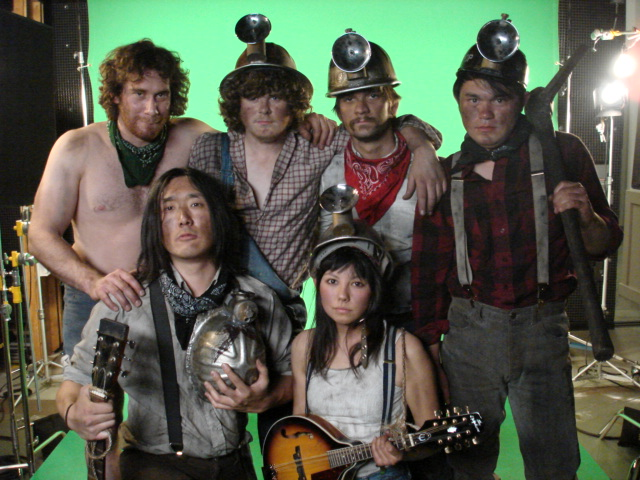
- Dusty Rhodes and the River Band "Dear Honey" video shoot

Background information
- Origin: Anaheim, California; United States
- Genres: Indie rock Alternative rock Folk rock Soul music
- Years active: 2002–2011
- Label: Side One Dummy
- Members: Dustin Apodaca; Andrea Babinski; Eric Chirco; Edson Choi; Kyle Divine; Brad Babinski
- Past members: Tim Schneider; Allen Van Orman; Brian Lara
- Website: Dusty Rhodes at Side One Dummy Records

Dusty Rhodes and the River Band were an American six-piece indie-rock group from Anaheim, California. They were heavily influenced by the folk-rock sounds of The Band, the orchestration and production techniques of Brian Wilson of the Beach Boys, and the progressive-rock energy of groups like Yes.

== History ==
In late 2007, the band signed with SideOneDummy Records. Their first full-length album First You Live, produced by Mars Volta keyboardist Isaiah "Ikey" Owens was released October 19, 2007.

In December 2007, The Orange County Register named First You Live the best album to come out of Orange County in 2007.

The band toured and played with national acts, including Damn Pretty Things, Brand New, Gogol Bordello, Blind Melon, Flogging Molly, Jonny Lang, Los Lobos, Mofro, Shooter Jennings, The Aquabats.

Dusty Rhodes and the River Band finished recording their second full length in January 2009. The album is titled Palace and Stage, it was produced by Ted Hutt and featured 12 new tracks. Palace and Stage was released on May 19, 2009, by SideOneDummy Records.

In March 2010, the group finished a self-titled album produced by Juan Suarez. It featured new recordings of previously released material in addition to newly composed songs. The album Dusty Rhodes and the River Band was self-released on July 6, 2010.

On August 5, 2010, Dustin Apodaca announced that the group had decided to disband. On the same day, Apodaca publicly declared his intention to run for a position on the Anaheim City Council.

On June 10, 2011, the band played its final concert at the House of Blues in Anaheim.

== Discography ==
=== Albums ===
Year	Album
2006	Cut Open Like a Fish: Released: November 7, 2006
2007	First You Live: Released: October 19, 2007; Label: SideOneDummy Records
2009	Palace and Stage: Released: May 19, 2009; Label: SideOneDummy Records
2010	Dusty Rhodes and the River Band: Released: July 6, 2010

== Band members ==
- Dustin Apodaca – vocals, synthesizer, accordion, keyboard, bells
- Kyle Divine – guitar, vocals, ukulele
- Andrea Babinski – violin, vocals
- Edson Choi – vocals, guitar, bass
- Eric Chirco – drums, marimba
- Brad Babinski – bass guitar

== See also ==
- List of alternative-music artists
- List of indie-rock bands
- List of soul musicians
