= Flight of the Wounded Locust =

EP by The Locust
- Released: October 2, 2001
- Genre: Hardcore punk; noise rock
- Length: 10:14
- Label: Gold Standard Laboratories

The Locust chronology
The Locust (1999)	Flight of the Wounded Locust (2001)	Follow the Flock, Step in Shit (2003)

Professional ratings
Review scores
Source	Rating
Allmusic	3/5 stars
Pitchfork Media	7.8/10

Flight of the Wounded Locust is a 7-inch EP by American noise rock band The Locust. It was released in 2001 on Gold Standard Laboratories. Flight of the Wounded Locust was also the band's final recording as a five-piece (after which drummer David Astor left and was replaced by then-guitarist Gabe Serbian).

The EP was released on 7-inch clear vinyl, CD, and as a limited edition box set with four 7-inch records, all shaped like puzzle pieces and colored differently. The CD and 4×7″ versions of the EP contain five bonus tracks released on a split 7-inch with Arab on Radar.

== Track listing ==
1. "Gluing Carpet to Your Genitals Does Not Make You a Cantaloupe" – 0:50
2. "Turning Your Merchandise into a Ripped Wall of Mini-Abs" – 0:37
3. "Bring Your 6.5 Italian Carbine" – 0:43
4. "Alas, Here Come the Hypochondriacs to Wait With You in the Lobby" – 0:43
5. "Siphoning Projectiles During Selective Amnesia" – 1:06
6. "Get Off the Cross, the Wood Is Needed" – 0:42
7. "Wet Nurse Syndrome Hand-Me-Down Display Case" – 0:34
8. "This Is Radio Surgery" – 0:41
9. "Spitting in the Faces of Fools as a Source of Nutrition" – 0:45
10. "Sever the Toes" – 0:52
11. "Flight of the Wounded Locust" – 2:36

== Personnel ==
- Justin Pearson – vocals, bass guitar
- Gabe Serbian – guitar
- Joey Karam – keyboards, vocals
- Bobby Bray – guitar, vocals
- David Astor – drums
