= How Do You Dub? You Fight for Dub. You Plug Dub In. =

EP by De Facto
- Released: October 16, 2001
- Recorded: June 1999, December 2000
- Genres: Electronica, dub, reggae
- Length: 19:12
- Label: Restart Records
- Producer: De Facto

De Facto chronology
Megaton Shotblast (2001)	How Do You Dub? You Fight for Dub. You Plug Dub In. (2001)	Légende du Scorpion à Quatre Queues (2001)

How Do You Dub? You Fight for Dub. You Plug Dub In. is the third EP by American dub reggae band De Facto. It was released on Restart Records, a record label founded by Jim Ward, Paul Hinojos and Silas Carter, soon after Megaton Shotblast. How Do You Dub? is a repackaged version of the band's eponymous debut release which came out in 1999 as a very limited vinyl pressing. It features a different track order as well as replaces "Drop" with a new track "Nux Vomica/Coaxialreturn" (the only one to feature contributions from keyboardist Ikey Owens).

== Track listing ==
No.	Title	Length
1.	"Coaxial"	1:43
2.	"Madagascar"	3:02
3.	"Agua Mineral"	2:04
4.	"Defacto"	1:58
5.	"1024 1/2"	0:27
6.	"Thick Vinyl Plate"	3:04
7.	"Radio Rebelde"	2:34
8.	"Nux Vomica/Coaxialreturn"	4:20
Total length:		19:12

== Personnel ==
- Omar Rodríguez-López – bass
- Cedric Bixler-Zavala – drums, voice, keyboards, samples
- Jeremy Ward – melodica, voice, drum machine, sound manipulation
- Isaiah Ikey Owens – keyboards & electronic beats on track 8
