= EP (Crystal Antlers EP) =

EP by Crystal Antlers
- Released: February 9, 2008
- Genre: Indie rock
- Length: 24:12
- Label: Touch and Go
- Producer: Isaiah "Ikey" Owens

Crystal Antlers chronology
EP (2008)	Tentacles (2009)

Professional ratings
Review scores
Source	Rating
Cokemachineglow	(75/100)
Pitchfork Media	(8.5/10)
PopMatters	(8/10)
Prefix	(9.0/10)

EP is the first release by Crystal Antlers. It was self-released on 9 February 2008 and has subsequently been re-released on Touch and Go Records. It was produced by The Mars Volta keyboardist Isaiah "Ikey" Owens.

== Track listing ==
1. "Until the Sun Dies (Part 2)" – 3:48
2. "Vexation" – 2:20
3. "A Thousand Eyes" – 5:21
4. "Owl" – 3:15
5. "Arcturus" – 2:29
6. "Parting Song for the Torn Sky" – 7:02
