= Two-Way Mirror =

Studio album by Crystal Antlers
- Released: 12 July 2011
- Genre: Psychedelic rock, garage, punk
- Label: Recreation Ltd.
- Producer: Ikey Owens, Anthony Arvisu and Crystal Antlers

Crystal Antlers chronology
Tentacles (2008)	Two-Way Mirror (2011)

Professional ratings
Review scores
Source	Rating
NME	(7/10) link
Pitchfork Media	(7.0/10) link

Two-Way Mirror is the third studio album of the band Crystal Antlers. It was released by Recreation Ltd. on July 12, 2011. Former albums of the band was released by Touch And Go Records.

== Track listing ==
1. "Jules' Story" - 3:27
2. "Seance" - 2:57
3. "Summer Solstice" - 3:16
4. "By the Sawkill" - 3:45
5. "Two-Way Mirror" - 3:01
6. "Way Out" - 1:42
7. "Fortune Telling" - 3:05
8. "Always Afraid" - 1:57
9. "Knee Deep" - 2:24
10. "Sun-Bleached" - 2:27
11. "Dog Days" - 6:38

== Personnel ==
- Jonny Bell: Vocals, Bass
- Andrew King: Guitar
- Cora Foxx: Keys
- Damian Edwards: Percussion
- Kevin Stewart: Drums
