= Patent Pending (album) =

Studio album by Heavens
- Released: September 11, 2006
- Recorded: 2004–2006
- Genres: Alternative rock, indie rock, gothic rock
- Length: 42:00
- Label: Epitaph
- Producers: Ben Lovett, Heavens

Professional ratings
Review scores
Source	Rating
AllMusic	4/5 stars
Aversion.com	4/5 stars
IGN	6.9/10
Music Emissions	4/5 stars
Punknews.org	3/5 stars
Rockfeedback	4/5 stars
Spin	3.5/5 stars

Patent Pending is the only album by Heavens, a side project formed by Matt Skiba, vocalist and guitarist for Alkaline Trio, and Josiah Steinbrick of F-Minus. The album was released on September 11, 2006 in Europe, and on September 12, 2006 in the United States.

The duo are accompanied on the album by a number of accomplished musicians, including The Mars Volta's Isaiah "Ikey" Owens. Patent Pending deviated from the duo's punk background, blending dark, brooding instrumentals with poignant lyrics.

The creation of the album began when Skiba moved to Los Angeles and became housemates with Steinbrick. Written primarily in 2004, the album's creation involved a synergistic process with Steinbrick's music laying the foundation for Skiba's lyrics. Producer Ben Lovett and drummer Matthew Compton played key roles in the album's development. The partnership with Epitaph Records for its release was significantly influenced by the label founder's appreciation for the project.

While not strictly categorized as emo, the album shared the characteristic rawness and appeal of modern alternative music in the mid-2000s. The album's tracks, such as "Gardens" and "Counting," displayed a mix of gothic and dark punk elements, making it a distinctive work in the alternative music landscape of the early 21st century.

== Track listing ==
All songs by Heavens (Steinbrick/Skiba) except where noted

1. "Gardens" – 3:05
2. "Counting" – 3:39
3. "Heather" – 3:53
4. "Patent Pending" – 3:45
5. "Dead End Girl" (Steinbrick/Skiba/Ben Lovett) – 4:58
6. "Doves" – 0:56
7. "Another Night" – 3:36
8. "Annabelle" (Steinbrick/Skiba/Sam Soto) – 3:53
9. "Watching You" – 4:14
10. "True Hate" – 5:16
11. "Leave" – 4:45

== Production ==
- Produced by Ben Lovett and Heavens
- Engineered by Ben Lovett at Sunny Heights
- Mixed by Ryan Hewitt
- Assisted by George Gumbs
- Mixed at Paramount Recording, Los Angeles and Encore Studios, Burbank
- Mastered by Tom Baker at Precision Mastering
- String engineering by Dana Neilsen and Donnie Whitbeck
- String arrangement by Amanda Course, Todd Simon and Ben Lovett
- Art direction and design by Nick Pritchard
- Photography by Bryan Sheffield

== Additional musicians ==
- Matthew Compton: drums, percussion, piano
- Adam Zuckert: additional drums
- Isaiah "Ikey" Owens: organ
- Erica Daking: backing vocals
- Ben Lovett: drum programming, rhodes, synth, wurlitzer, percussion, noise, backing vocals, additional vocals and guitar on "Dead End Girl"
- Julie Carpenter: violin
- Marina Hall: violin
- Paloma Udovic: violin
- Amanda Course: viola
- Mia Barcia-Colombo: cello
- Ana Lenchantin: cello

== Samples ==
- Listen to "Patent Pending" at Epitaph.com
