= Rhythm of Black Lines =

American rock band

- Origin: Austin, Texas
- Genres: Indie rock, math rock
- Years active: 1998-2004
- Label: Sixgunlover
- Past members: Clint Newsom, Kiki Solis, Tim O'Neil, Omar Chavez, Paul Newman

Rhythm of Black Lines was a rock group from Austin, Texas founded in 1998 by Clint Newsom, Kiki Solis, Tim O'Neil, Omar Chavez, and Paul Newman. The band's first two albums were issued on the Sixgunlover imprint. The group released their last record on Gold Standard Laboratories label, run by Sonny Kay and Omar Rodríguez-López.

== Discography ==
- Rhythm of Black Lines (1999) Sixgunlover Records
- Set a Summary Table (2000) Sixgunlover Records
- HOME Vol. 3 - Split With Pavo (2001) Post-Parlo Records
- Split With Pele (2002) Sixgunlover Records
- Human Hand, Animal Band (2004) Gold Standard Laboratories
