= The Starlite Desperation =

American rock band

The Starlite Desperation is an American rock band originally from Monterey, California, formed in 1995. Combining elements of garage rock, punk, psychedelic music, goth rock, post punk, glam rock and 60s pop. They released three full-length records, 1 EP, and 3 singles, on several labels, including Gold Standard Laboratories. The founding members were Dante Adrian White, Jeff Ehrenberg, and Dana Lacono. In 1999, the band relocated to Detroit, Michigan and then to Los Angeles, California in 2002. In 2004, their song Born To Be Dizzy was used to close the film, The Heart Is Deceitful Above All Things, directed by Asia Argento. The band toured extensively in The United States, Canada and Europe with numerous groups, including Make-Up, Black Rebel Motorcycle Club, The Rapture, The (International) Noise Conspiracy, The Brian Jonestown Massacre, The Dirtbombs, The Donnas, The Ponys, and The Yeah Yeah Yeahs. The group was active from 1995 to 2008.

== Discography ==
- 1997 Our Product/It Rhymes With Bitch 7" Catchpenny records
- 1998 Shut My Door 7" Gold Standard Laboratories
- 1998 Show You What A Baby Won't LP/CD Gold Standard Laboratories
- 1999 Hot For Preacher 7" Gold Standard Laboratories Produced by Kid Congo Powers
- 2000 Go Kill Mice LP/CD Flapping Jet
- 2004 Violate A Sundae EP/CD Cold Sweat
- 2005 I Lost My Bees 7" (Split with Indian Jewelry) Gold Standard Laboratories
- 2006 Don't Do Time CD Double Zombie
- 2008 Take It Personally LP/CD Infrasonic
