= Free Moral Agents =

Former American musical group

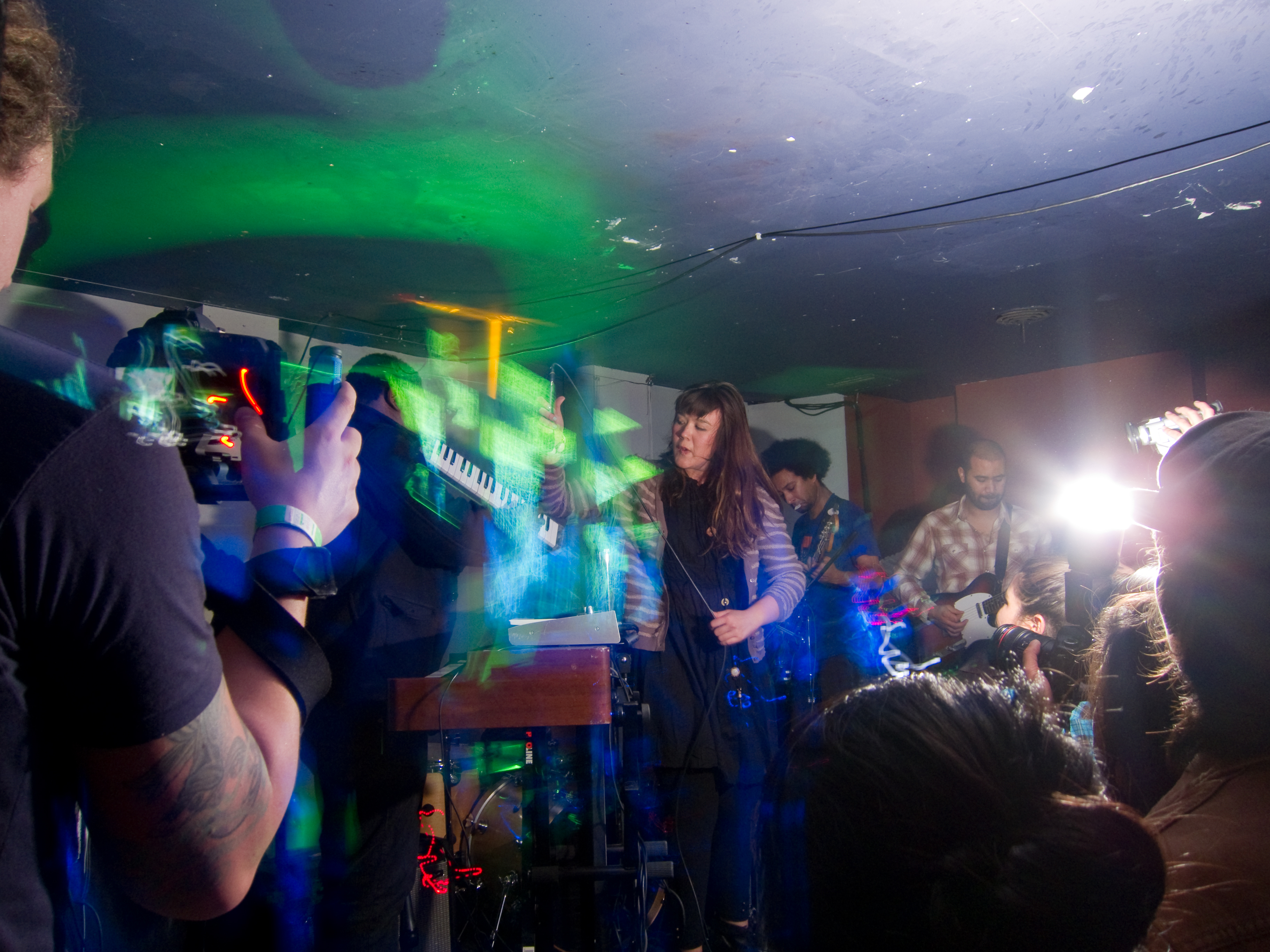
- Free Moral Agents performing at Low End Theory

Background information
- Origin: Long Beach, California
- Genres: Jazz, hip hop, psychedelic, dub
- Years active: 2003–2014
- Label: Gold Standard Labs
- Past members: Isaiah "Ikey" Owens; Mendee Ichikawa; Dennis Owens; Ryan Reiff; Reid Kinnett; Jesse Carzello

Free Moral Agents were a collective of musicians brought together by Isaiah "Ikey" Owens, then-keyboardist of The Mars Volta, as a means to expand the sounds of what started as a solo recording project. In the spring of 2006, the band started playing shows around Long Beach and Los Angeles. Free Moral Agents combine elements of jazz, trip-hop, psychedelia, and improvisational rock.

== History ==
Ikey Owens formed Free Moral Agents after he was fired from The Mars Volta in 2002. With his newfound free time, he started a home recording project which eventually became said band. Owens states,

"There was a time, before I put the record out, that I wasn't playing in Mars Volta anymore, and I had just bought a bunch of recording instruments. I'd always wanted to record my own record but never did, so [Free Moral Agents] really started with just me. I knew J, who was actually my girlfriend at the time's brother-in-law, who did poetry and sang and stuff, so I got together with him. This is before the vinyl. I was working at this record store and started talking to my friend Jeff Harris, who it turns out, was really good with Pro Tools, so I added him to the group. He's really a producer and doesn't really play with us live, but he's very much responsible for the sound of the record. I knew Mendee [Ichikawa] for several years, and we had worked on and off, but I knew we needed a female element to the group, so that's basically what Free Moral Agents is right there. As far as the music goes, it started as my project, but these people who I know I can trust, really bring it together.

In April 2009, Owens released two live tracks for free. In 2010, the group released its 2nd full-length album entitled Control This for Gold Standard Laboratories.

== Members ==
- Isaiah "Ikey" Owens - keyboards, producer, concepts
- Mendee Ichikawa - vocals, echo, words, melodies
- Dennis Owens - bass, falsetto
- Ryan Reiff - drums, beats
- Reid Kinnett - rhodes, effects
- Jesse Carzello - guitar, noise

== Discography ==
Studio albums

- Everybody's Favorite Weapon (2004)
- Momma's Gun Club Vol. 1 (2006 as download on AlphaPup) (February 27, 2007, as download on iTunes)
- Control This (Formerly The Honey in the Carcass of the Lion) (September 28, 2010)
- Chaine Infinie Plus (February 12, 2014)

EPs

- Lay Down (2003)
- Subtitle / Free Moral Agents – Leave Home / Instinctively Intact (2004)
- Free Moral Agents (2008)
- Self Titled 7-inch EP - Free Moral Agents (September 9, 2008, on clear red vinyl, Broken Tape Publishing [300 copies])
- Free Moral Agents / Mainey Wilson – Aravand / Veiled Visions (2011)
- Chaine Infinie (2014)

Live Albums

- Live At The Prospector (2010)
- Majestic Soundsystem (Live At Low End Theory) (2013)

Singles

- The Special 12 Singles Series - Free Moral Agents (2005 as 7-inch vinyl, 500 copies) (October 3, 2006, as download on iTunes [Special Twelve Singles Series])
- "North Is Red" (b/w North is Red remix by Tony Allen) 10-inch vinyl single - Chocolate Industries (2009)

Other Recordings

- Looking For Lauryn Hill in Lakewood - Free Moral Agents (May 2007 as download on AlphaPup)
