= The Locust (EP) =

EP by The Locust
- Released: March 1997
- Genre: Powerviolence; mathcore
- Length: 7:31
- Label: Gold Standard Laboratories

The Locust chronology
The Locust / Jenny Piccolo (1996)	The Locust (1997)	The Locust (1998)

Professional ratings
Review scores
Source	Rating
AllMusic	4.5/5 stars
Pitchfork	6.0/10

The Locust is the third release by The Locust. It was released on Gold Standard Laboratories in March 1997.

The Locust is The Locust's first recording that relies heavily on keyboards and synthesizers, combined with their powerviolence style, influenced mainly by Crossed Out. This is the sound for which The Locust has since become known.

In 2004, the EP was remastered and re-issued on 3" CD and 7" vinyl, and included two bonus tracks.

== Track listing ==
=== Side A ===
1. "Halfway to a Worthless Ideal Arrangement (An Interlude to a Discontinued Sarcastic Harmony... Yea Whatever)" – 0:44
2. "Prepare to Qualify" – 0:31
3. "Kill Roger Hedgecock" – 0:46
4. "Pain Reliever" – 0:27
5. "Off by a Long Shot" – 0:42

=== Side B ===
1. "Cattle Mutilation" – 0:27
2. "#99" – 1:19
3. "Head Hits Concrete" – 0:27
4. "Hairspray Suppository" – 0:43
5. "Ass Gravity" (re-issue bonus track) – 0:47
6. "Keep Off the Tracks" (re-issue bonus track) – 0:33

== Personnel ==
- James LaValle – vocals, keyboards
- Justin Pearson – vocals, bass
- Robert Bray – guitar
- David Astor – drums
- Jesse Keeler – photography
