= The Locust (album) =

Studio album by The Locust
- Released: September 1998
- Genre: Powerviolence; mathcore; grindcore
- Length: 17:42
- Label: Gold Standard Laboratories

The Locust chronology
The Locust EP (1997)	The Locust (1998)	Flight of the Wounded Locust (2001)

The Locust is the debut studio album by American grindcore band The Locust.

== Background ==
The Locust formed in 1994, the band initially were Justin Pearson and Dylan Scharf, whose other band, Struggle, was about to come to an end. As they recruited Dave Astor, Bobby Bray, and Dave Warshaw the band began paving their powerviolence influenced sound and began developing identity on their early split releases with Man Is The Bastard and Jenny Piccolo. The line up of the band would change over the years with Joseph Karam and Gabe Serbian joining. Starting as a band that fit with their hardcore peers, they soon settled on an aesthetic of sci-fi and entomology would begin to manifest in their artwork and lyrics as early as 1998. Within a few years the band would start performing live in elaborate costumes (dubbed uniforms by the band), this became integral to the band’s persona.

== Composition and lyrics ==
The album's sound has been described as a mix of grindcore, punk and new wave. David Anthony of Vice, stated "There was a sense of world-building going on with The Locust, as the visuals, music, and lyrics touched on subjects that were never totally aligned with hardcore. Though it wasn’t totally rare for a punk album to run less than 20 minutes, The Locust covered a lot of ground in the LP's 16-and-a-half minutes, as they wrote songs that felt unburdened by punk’s traditions. The songs could be noisy and abrasive, but they’d shift on a dime toward something that, against all odds, was actually kind of catchy." Some commentators have said the lyrics were basically indecipherable, but have also been described as "...like jumping into a pulpy sci-fi film".

== Track listing ==
Side one

No.	Title	Length
1.	"Moth-Eaten Deer Head"	1:12
2.	"Brand New Set of Teeth"	0:38
3.	"How to Build a Pessimistic Lie Detector"	0:37
4.	"Nice Tranquil Thumb in Mouth"	0:41
5.	"Dog Without a Collar (Run over Red Rover)"	0:46
6.	"The Perils of Believing in Round Squares"	0:29
7.	"Normal Run of the Muck (Compensation for Conversation)"	0:55

Side two

No.	Title	Length
8.	"Stucco Obelisks Labeled as Trees"	0:33
9.	"Straight from the Horse's Mouth"	0:45
10.	"An Extra Piece of Dead Meat"	1:12
11.	"Twenty-Three Full-Time Cowboys"	0:39
12.	"Backbones of Jack Asses"	1:06
13.	"Fixed Companionship, Ghost Town Irrationality"	1:22
14.	"Skin Graft at Seventy-Five Miles Per Hour"	0:38
15.	"High-Maintenance Libido, Bring the Whole Family"	0:41

1999 3" mini CD release

No.	Title	Length
0.	"Untitled (Kid606 remix)" (hidden track in the pregap)	1:13
1.	"Moth-Eaten Deer Head"	1:12
2.	"Brand New Set of Teeth"	0:38
3.	"How to Build a Pessimistic Lie Detector"	0:37
4.	"Nice Tranquil Thumb in Mouth"	0:41
5.	"Dog Without a Collar (Run over Red Rover)"	0:46
6.	"The Perils of Believing in Round Squares"	0:29
7.	"Normal Run of the Muck (Compensation for Conversation)"	0:55
8.	"Stucco Obelisks Labeled as Trees"	0:33
9.	"Straight from the Horse's Mouth"	0:45
10.	"An Extra Piece of Dead Meat"	1:12
11.	"Twenty-Three Full-Time Cowboys"	0:39
12.	"Backbones of Jack Asses"	1:06
13.	"Fixed Companionship, Ghost Town Irrationality"	1:22
14.	"Skin Graft at Seventy-Five Miles Per Hour"	0:38
15.	"High-Maintenance Libido, Bring the Whole Family"	0:41
16.	"Well I'll Be a Monkey's Uncle"	0:59
17.	"Halfway to a Worthless Ideal Arrangement (An Interlude to a Discontinued Sarcastic Harmony... Yea Whatever)"	0:50
18.	"Kill Roger Hedgecock"	0:49
19.	"Hairspray Suppository"	0:49
20.	"Cattle Mutilation"	0:48

== Personnel ==
- Justin Pearson – vocals, bass guitar
- Gabe Serbian – guitar
- Joey Karam – keyboards, vocals
- Bobby Bray – guitar, vocals
- David Astor – drums
