= Automatic (The Stitches album) =

Studio album by The Stitches
- Released: 2006
- Genre: Hardcore punk

Automatic is a punk rock/hardcore punk CD released by the band The Stitches.

== Track listing ==
1. "(I'm the) Hillside Strangler"
2. "Automatic"
3. "Electroshock Carol"
