= Crystal Antlers =

American band

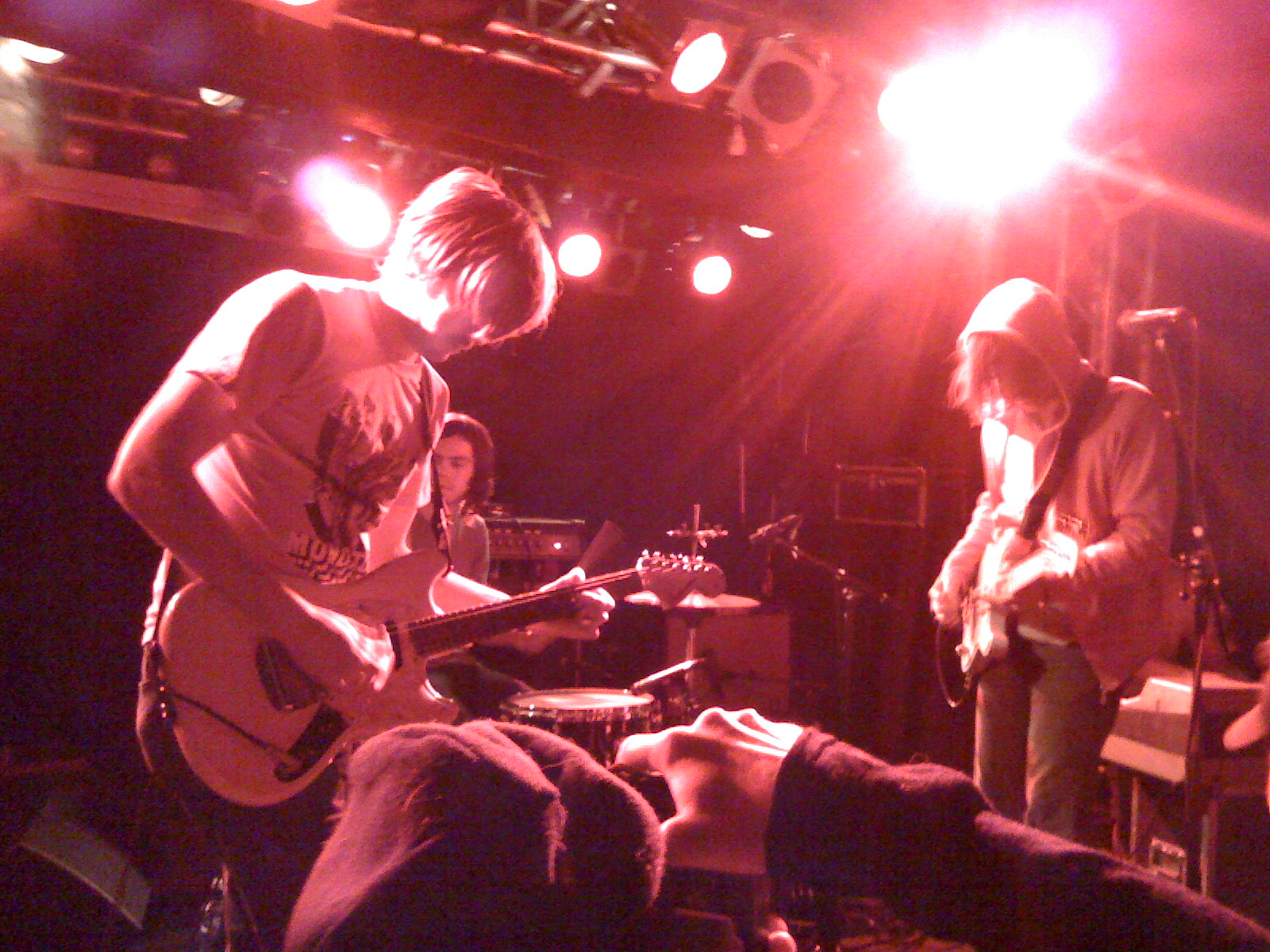
- Crystal Antlers at Debaser in Stockholm, Sweden

Background information
- Origin: Long Beach, California
- Genres: indie rock, neo-psychedelia, psychedelic rock
- Years active: 2006–present
- Labels: Innovative Leisure
- Members: Jonny Bell; Andrew King; Kevin Stuart
- Past members: Errol Davis; Victor Rodriguez; Cora Foxx; Damian Edwards
- Website: www.crystalantlers.com

Crystal Antlers was an American band from Long Beach, California.

== History ==
=== Origins ===
The band started in late 2006 in Long Beach, California, as a 3-piece, Kevin Stuart (drums), Errol Davis (guitar) and Jonny Bell (bass/vocals). The three had met in high school music class and later worked together as chimney sweeps. Their first single was recorded at Closer Studio in San Francisco; "Parting Song For The Torn Sky" was later re-mixed for the band's first EP.

After the first single was recorded, Victor Rodriguez-Guerrero joined the band on organ. In 2007, Damian Edwards joined on percussion. A second single was released in 2007 under the label Backflip, out of Orange, California, produced by guitarist Michael Belfer, and recorded at Mama Jo's; this song, "Until The Sun Dies (Part 2)", was likewise later re-recorded for the EP.

=== Crystal Antlers EP, Tentacles, and Touch & Go Records (2008–2009) ===
In the fall of 2007, Crystal Antlers began recording its first EP, Crystal Antlers, with producer Ikey Owens, who had been making regular guest appearances with the band for several months. After the majority of the tracking was complete, guitarist Errol Davis left the band to pursue other interests and Andrew King joined. The EP was released in March 2008. In summer 2008 the band signed with the label Touch and Go records, who re-issued the EP with new art by Jefferson Mayday Mayday.

Tentacles, their debut LP, was released on April 7, 2009, as the last new release issued by Touch and Go. The band spent the rest of 2009 touring the US and Europe in support of the release.

=== 2010 ===
In the summer of 2009, organist Victor Rodriguez-Guerrero left the band and was replaced by Cora Foxx. In the fall of 2009 the band self-released a tape entitled Tapes Volume 1 Tentacles Era, featuring home recordings, previously unreleased demos and other rarities. The tape is to be the first in a series of very limited hand-made releases by the band.

In February 2010, the band briefly moved into a barn in La Punta Banda, Mexico, to begin writing for its next album, Two-Way Mirror, which was released in summer 2011.

=== 2013 ===
On October 15, the band released its third album, Nothing Is Real, on the boutique Los Angeles label Innovative Leisure.

== Members ==
Current

- Jonny Bell – bass, woodwinds, vocals
- Andrew King – guitar
- Kevin Stuart – drums

Former

- Victor Rodriguez - organ
- Errol Davis – guitar, organ
- Cora Foxx - organ
- Damian Edwards – percussion

== Discography ==
Studio albums

Year	Title	Label	Notes
2008	Crystal Antlers EP CD/LP/Download	Self-Released, Touch & Go Records	S/R version limited to 3000
2009	Tentacles CD/LP/Download	Touch And Go Records	-
2011	Two-Way Mirror	Recreation Ltd.	-
2011	Son of The Mirror 10" Vinyl only	Recreation Ltd.	Limited to 500
2013	Nothing Is Real CD/LP/Download	Innovative Leisure	-

Singles

Year	Title	Label	Notes
2006	Parting Song For The Torn Sky 7"/CDR	Majic Wallet	Limited to 500
2007	Swamp Song 7"	Backflip	Limited to 250
2010	Little Sister/Dead Horses 7"/Download	Self-Released	Limited to 500
2011	Summer Solstice 4-Ways 7"	Recreation Ltd.	Limited to 500

Collections and compilations

Year	Title	Label	Song/Notes
2007	Spanish Archer Compilation CD/Download	Spanish Archer	Featured a cover of Bob Dylan's It's all over now baby blue
2008	Trust Us "A Long Beach Compilation" CD/Download	Fidotrust	Featured an alternate mix of the song Arcturus
2009	Tapes' Volume No. 1 "Tentacles Era" Cassette	Self-Released	Featured 21 Tracks of demos, work tapes and other rarities
2010	Chickens In Love Compilation CD/LP/Download	826 LA	Featured the song "100 Pigs" written by kids with the band
