= First You Live =

Studio album by Dusty Rhodes and the River Band
- Released: October 19, 2007
- Genre: Indie rock Alternative rock Folk rock Soul music
- Label: SideOneDummy Records
- Producer: Isaiah "Ikey" Owens

Dusty Rhodes and the River Band chronology
Cut Open Like a Fish (2006)	First You Live (2007)	Palace and Stage (2009)

First You Live is the title of Dusty Rhodes and the River Band's second album, released on October 19, 2007.

== Track listing ==
- All songs written and arranged by Dusty Rhodes and the River Band.
1. "Intro"
2. "First You Live"
3. "Leaving Tennessee"
4. "Ghost Trails"
5. "Dear Honey"
6. "Oh Icicle"
7. "Strike"
8. "Keys To The Truck"
9. "Then You Pass"
10. "Street Fighter"
11. "Grampa Mac"
12. "Goodnight, Moonshine"
13. "The Ballad Of Graff"

== Personnel ==
=== Dusty Rhodes and the River Band ===
- Dustin Apodaca: Vocals, Keyboards, Accordion
- Kyle Divine: Guitars, Harmonica, Vocals
- Edson Choi: Electric, Acoustic and Lap Steel Guitars, Banjo, Sitar, Vocals
- Andrea Babinski: Violin, Mandolin, Vocals
- Allen Van Orman: Bass
- Eric Chirco: Drums, Percussion
- Tim Schneider: Drums, Percussion

=== Additional personnel ===
- Anthony Arvizu: Percussion
- Stephen Hodges: Tympani
- Horns (Phillip Inzerillo: Trombone; Jared Parsons: Saxophone) and strings (Katie Mendenhall: Cello) arranged by Andrea Babinski
- Megan McCliesh: Vocals

== Production ==
- Produced by Isiah "Ikey" Owens
- Recording Engineers: Anthony Arvizu, Jeff "Lightning" Lewis and Marcus Samperio
- Mixed by Ryan Williams
- Mastered by Eddy Schreyer
