= De Facto (De Facto album) =

EP by De Facto
- Released: 1999
- Recorded: Pagan Roma, June 1999
- Genre: Dub reggae, experimental, electronica
- Label: Headquarter Records
- Producer: De Facto

De Facto chronology
De Facto (1999)	456132015 (2001)

De Facto is the first EP by American dub reggae band De Facto. It was recorded in June 1999 at Jeremy Ward's home studio Pagan Roma and released on Headquarter Records (spelled as "Head 1/4" on paper insert) as a limited vinyl pressing, and is currently very hard to find.

The EP was later repackaged and released as How Do You Dub? You Fight For Dub. You Plug Dub In.

== Track listing ==
Side A

1. "Coaxial" – 1:42
2. "Madagascar" – 3:03
3. "Agua Minerál" – 2:07
4. "De Facto" – 1:58
5. "1024½" – 0:29

Side B

1. "Thick Vinyl Plate" – 3:04
2. "Drop" – 4:20
3. "Radio Rebelde" – 2:32

== Personnel ==
- Omar Rodríguez-López – bass
- Cedric Bixler-Zavala – drums, keyboards, samples
- Jeremy Ward – melodica, voice, sound manipulation
- Ralph Jasso – keyboards
