= Plague Soundscapes =

Studio album by the Locust
- Released: June 24, 2003
- Genres: Grindcore; noise rock; mathcore; powerviolence
- Length: 21:03
- Label: ANTI-
- Producer: Alex Newport

The Locust chronology
Follow the Flock, Step in Shit (2003)	Plague Soundscapes (2003)	Safety Second, Body Last (2005)

Professional ratings
Review scores
Source	Rating
AllMusic	4/5 stars
Drowned in Sound	8/10
IGN	7.8/10
Pitchfork Media	8.3/10
PopMatters	(favorable)
Punknews.org	4/5 stars
Uncut	4/5 stars

Plague Soundscapes is the second studio album by the Locust, and their first with ANTI- Records. It features a more refined sound than previous The Locust albums, with a greater emphasis on keyboards.

== Track listing ==
No.	Title	Length
1.	"Recyclable Body Fluids in Human Form"	0:41
2.	"Identity Exchange Program Rectum Return Policy"	0:59
3.	"Solar Panel Asses"	0:26
4.	"Live from the Russian Compound"	0:59
5.	"Earwax Halo Manufactured for the Champion in All of Us"	0:52
6.	"Wet Dream War Machine"	1:24
7.	"Listen, the Mighty Ear Is Here"	1:07
8.	"Who Wants a Dose of the Clap?"	0:52
9.	"Teenage Mustache"	0:55
10.	"How to Become a Virgin"	0:44
11.	"Anything Jesus Does I Can Do Better"	1:29
12.	"Late for a Double Date with a Pile of Atoms in the Water Closet"	0:46
13.	"File Under 'Soft Core Seizures'"	0:54
14.	"Practiced Hatred" (Crossed Out cover)	0:34
15.	"Psst! Is That a Halfie in Your Pants?"	1:06
16.	"The Half-Eaten Sausage Would Like to See You in His Office"	0:47
17.	"Pulling the Christmas Pig by the Wrong Pair of Ears"	0:42
18.	"Can We Get Another Nail in the Coffin of Culture Theft?"	1:17
19.	"Your Mantel Disguised as a Psychic Sasquatch"	0:40
20.	"Twenty-Three Lubed Up Schizophrenics with Delusions of Grandeur"	0:52
21.	"Captain Gaydar It's Time to Wind Your Clock Again"	1:03
22.	"Priest with the Sexually Transmitted Diseases Get Out of My Bed"	0:33
23.	"Pickup Truck Full of Forty Minutes"	1:21

== Personnel ==
- Justin Pearson – bass guitar, vocals
- Bobby Bray – guitar, vocals
- Joey Karam – keyboards, vocals
- Gabe Serbian – drums
