= Follow the Flock, Step in Shit =

EP by The Locust
- Released: 2003
- Genre: Grindcore; noise rock
- Length: 3:07

The Locust chronology
Flight of the Wounded Locust (2001)	Follow the Flock, Step in Shit (2003)	Plague Soundscapes (2003)

Follow the Flock, Step in Shit is the second studio recording by The Locust. The EP consists of the two tracks that appeared on the split 5" picture disc with Jenny Piccolo, as well as the track "Red" from the Cry Now, Cry Later Vol. 4 compilation album. The EP came on a 3" square CD.

== Track listing ==
1. "Follow the Flock, Step in Shit" – 1:29
2. "Coffin Nails" – 0:29
3. "Red" – 1:09
