= Safety Second, Body Last =

EP by The Locust
- Released: April 11, 2005
- Recorded: 2005
- Genre: Mathcore; noise rock; experimental rock
- Length: 10:09
- Label: Ipecac; Southern; Radio Surgery
- Producer: Alex Newport

The Locust chronology
Plague Soundscapes (2003)	Safety Second, Body Last (2005)	New Erections (2007)

Safety Second, Body Last is an EP by American noise rock band The Locust. The band stated that the album is designed to be one 10-minute song, though it is split into two tracks, each of which is split into separate movements. The cover art is a piece titled "Treatment" by Neil Burke.

== Reception ==
Professional ratings
Review scores
Source	Rating
AllMusic	3.5/5 stars

Johnny Loftus of AllMusic described Safety Second, Body Last as "grindy noise with disquieting lulls."

== Track listing ==
1. Armless and Overactive

- "Who's Handling the Population Paste?"
- "Invented Organs"
- "New Tongue Sweepstakes"
- "Consenting Abscess (Part 1)"
- "Consenting Abscess (Part 2)"

2. One Decent Leg

- "Movement Across the Membrane"
- "Oscillating Eyes"
- "Immune System Overtime"
- "Hairy Mouth"
