= Tentacles (album) =

Studio album by Crystal Antlers
- Released: April 6, 2009
- Recorded: 2008–2009, Closer Recording, San Francisco, California, United States
- Genre: Psychedelic rock, garage, punk
- Length: 40:02
- Label: Touch and Go Records
- Producer: Crystal Antlers, Joe Goldring

Crystal Antlers chronology
EP (2008)	Tentacles (2009)

Professional ratings
Review scores
Source	Rating
AllMusic	link
BBC	Positive link
Drowned in Sound	link
The Guardian	link
Hot Press	link
musicOMH	link
NME	7/10 link
No Ripcord	8/10 link
Pitchfork	6.7/10 link
PopMatters	7/10 link
Prefix Magazine	8.5/10 link
Rolling Stone	link
Spin	link
Tiny Mix Tapes	link
Uncut	link
Yahoo!	8/10 link

Tentacles is the debut album by the band Crystal Antlers. It was released via Touch and Go Records on April 7, 2009 in the USA and a day earlier in the UK. Tentacles marked the final new release on Touch and Go for the foreseeable future after the label decided to downsize its operations significantly.

The album was met with a generally positive reception by critics, attaining a score of 71% from the reviews collated by Metacritic.

== Track listing ==
1. "Painless Sleep" - 2:16
2. "Dust" - 2:27
3. "Time Erased" - 3:37
4. "Andrew" - 3:34
5. "Vapour Trail" - 2:18
6. "Tentacles" - 1:54
7. "Until the Sun Dies (Part 1)" - 2:50
8. "Memorized" - 3:53
9. "Glacier" - 3:01
10. "Foot of the Mountain" - 0:25
11. "Your Spears" - 2:24
12. "Swollen Sky" - 4:12
13. "Several Tongues" - 7:11

== Personnel ==
- Jonny Bell: vocals, bass, woodwind
- Errol Davis: guitar, organ
- Andrew King: guitar
- Victor Rodriguez-Guerrero: organ, piano
- Damian Edwards: percussion, woodwind
- Kevin Stuart: drums
- Daniel Hawk: brass on tracks 8 and 9
