= Légende du Scorpion à Quatre Queues =

Studio album by De Facto
- Released: November 19, 2001
- Genres: Electronica, dub, reggae
- Length: 39:09
- Labels: Modern City Records, Rodriguez-Lopez Productions

De Facto chronology
| How Do You Dub? You Fight For Dub. You Plug Dub In. (2001) | Légende du Scorpion à Quatre Queues (2001) |

Légende du Scorpion à Quatre Queues ("Legend of the Four-Tailed Scorpion") is the second and most recent album to date by the experimental dub group De Facto, released in November 2001.

== Track listing ==
| No. | Title | Length |
|---|---|---|
| 1. | "Legend of the Four-Tailed Scorpion" | 3:02 |
| 2. | "Mattilious Creed" | 0:17 |
| 3. | "AMKHZ" | 3:16 |
| 4. | "Hoxadrine" (Live) | 8:58 |
| 5. | "Muerte Inoxia" | 3:48 |
| 6. | "Vesica Pisces" (Live) | 7:13 |
| 7. | "Cordova" | 5:16 |
| 8. | "120E7" (Original Version) | 4:49 |
| 9. | "Exit Template" | 2:30 |
| Total length: | | 39:09 |

== Personnel ==
- Omar Rodríguez-López – bass
- Cedric Bixler-Zavala – drums
- Isaiah "Ikey" Owens – keyboards, melodica
- Jeremy Ward – sound manipulation, melodica, vocals
- Mitchel Edward Klik – vocals on tracks 1 & 9
