= FM Bats =

Californian punk band

- Origin: Long Beach, California, United States
- Genres: Punk rock
- Years active: 2004–present
- Labels: TKO, Vinyl Dog Records, Sound Virus
- Members: Todd Jacobs; Leonard Salas; Tony Matarazzo
- Past members: Orlando Sanchez; Brett Cutts (1977-2006); Mike V.

FM Bats is a four-piece punk band from Long Beach, California that formed in 2004, consisting of singer Todd Jacobs (aka Hot Batch Todd or Nancy Manhands), formerly of The Distraction, Le Shok, and Neon King Kong; bassist Leonardo Salas of Parades End and I'm Gonna Stab You; drummer Tony Matarazzo of Grand Elegance; Brett Cutts;of palefire ; no ghost no zombie and Orlando Sanchez formerly of I'm Gonna Stab You and Parades End.

The band's 2005 debut album, Everybody Out... Shark in the Water, received a three and a half star rating from Punknews.org.

== History ==
After recording Everybody Out... Shark in the Water Orlando Sanchez left the band for a two-year sentence in a Nevada state prison. He was replaced by Brett Cutts who performed on Bats Are Out To Harm and for zmradio on KUCI, but the death of Cutts in March 2006 left the future of FM Bats in limbo. Dru Hubbell replaced Cutts from 2007 to 2008.

== Reviews ==
- "the last dangerous band in L.A." L.A.Record
- “The FM Bats pack in more action into their ten-minute EP, Everybody Out... Shark in the Water, than most bands pack into an entire album” Space City Rock (zine)
- "FM Bats don't have much time to spare" Splendid magazine

== Discography ==
- Everybody Out... Shark in the Water LP (Vinyl Dog Records)
- FM Bats Are Out To Harm LP (Sound Virus)
