= 8x12 =

Studio album by The Stitches
- Released: 1995
- Genre: Punk rock
- Length: 17:59
- Label: Vinyl Dog

8 x 12" is a studio album by the punk rock band The Stitches. It was released in 1995 on Vinyl Dog.

== Track listing ==
- All Songs Written by The Stitches, except where noted.
1. "Nowhere" 2:33
2. "I Can't Do Anything" 2:01
3. "Throw It Away" 1:36
4. "Better off Dead" 2:19
5. "My Baby Hates Me" 2:09
6. "True Stories" 2:24
7. "Amphetamine Girl" 2:09
8. "That Woman's Got Me Drinking" 2:49 (Shane MacGowan from The Pogues)

== Personnel ==
- Michael Lohrman: Vocals
- Johnny Witner: Guitars
- Pete Archer: Bass
- Johnny Sleeper: Drums
