= Le Shok =

US musical group

- Origin: Long Beach, California
- Genres: Punk rock, new wave, electropunk
- Years active: 1997–2001
- Labels: Tiger Suit, Know, Kapow, Slamdance Cosmpolis, Initial, Gold Standard Laboratories
- Past members: Andrew Reizuch: guitar Joey Karam: drums Todd Jacobs: vocals Darryl Williams: keyboards Rusty Cavender: bass guitar Shaan Obney: guitar, keyboards John Fones: keyboards

Le Shok was an American electropunk band from Long Beach, California. The band was made up of members of various other punk bands from the area and existed from 1997 until early 2001, releasing numerous seven-inch records and splits, releasing one full-length album, and touring the United States twice.

== Biography ==
Le Shok was formed in 1997 (originally under the name Shock) by Asshole Andrew (Treadwell) on guitar, Joey Juvenile (The Locust) on drums, and Hot Rod Todd on vocals. After hearing a rehearsal tape, Darryl Licht (Action League) joined the band on keyboards, and Over the Counter Rusty (Treadwell) joined as bassist.

The band released four seven-inch records on various labels, and in 2000, Gold Standard Laboratories released the band's sole album, We Are Electrocution, and the band went on a nationwide tour of the United States.

Shitty Shaan, who had filled in for Darryl Licht at shows he could not make, was eventually brought on full-time as a second guitarist. When Darryl left the band, Shaan switched to keyboards. Material recorded while the band was a six-piece found its way onto various vinyl releases.

When Andrew subsequently left the band, Shaan took over guitar duties, and John Fones of Tunigs was brought in on keyboards. Following their second U.S. tour, Fones departed, and Darryl briefly rejoined the band before Shaan quit, signaling the demise of the band in early 2001.

Following the band's break-up, members of Le Shok played in bands including Nazti Skinz, Neon King Kong, The Distraction, T-Cells, FM Bats, God's Iron Tooth, Sex Powers, Rats in the Louvre, and Dirty Girls.

The band played several reunion shows in 2018, followed by another reunion show in 2025.

== Discography ==
=== Albums ===
- Soda Pop Smash, an online compilation of all Le Shok material that was not on their full-length album, and is not an official release
- We Are Electrocution (2000)

=== Singles and EPs ===
- So What 7-inch EP (1998)
- DNA 7-inch EP (1999)
- split with Electric Frankenstein 7-inch (2000)
- split with Ink & Dagger 7-inch (2000)
- split with The Stitches 7-inch (2000)
- S&M 7-inch EP (2001)
- LA to NY 6" EP (2001)
