= New Erections =

Third and final studio album by American band the Locust

Studio album by the Locust
- Released: March 20, 2007
- Genres: Post-hardcore; noise rock; mathcore; sasscore
- Length: 23:25
- Label: ANTI-
- Producer: Alex Newport

The Locust chronology
Safety Second, Body Last (2005)	New Erections (2007)	The Peel Sessions (2010)

Professional ratings
Review scores
Source	Rating
AllMusic	3.5/5 stars
Alternative Press	4.5/5 stars
PopMatters	7/10 stars
Stylus Magazine	B

New Erections is the third and final studio album by American band the Locust. It was released on March 20, 2007, via ANTI-, their second album for the label. The cover art is by Neil Burke.

== Track listing ==
No.	Title	Length
1.	"AOTKPTA"	3:03
2.	"We Have Reached an Official Verdict: Nobody Gives a Shit"	1:22
3.	"The Unwilling... Led by the Unqualified... Doing the Unnecessary... for the Ungrateful"	3:55
4.	"One Manometer Away from Mutually Assured Relocation"	1:33
5.	"Full Frontal Obscurity"	1:50
6.	"Scavenger, Invader"	1:17
7.	"Hot Tubs Full of Brand New Fuel"	2:02
8.	"God Wants Us All to Work in Factories"	2:01
9.	"Book of Bot"	4:31
10.	"Slum Service (Served on the Sly)"	0:57
11.	"Tower of Mammal"	1:10

== Personnel ==
The Locust

- Justin Pearson – bass guitar, vocals
- Bobby Bray – guitar, vocals
- Joey Karam – keyboards, vocals
- Gabe Serbian – drums, guitar
- Wesley Eisold – backing vocals on 4

Production

- Alex Newport – production, engineering, mixing
- Gene Grimaldi – mastering
