= Jeremy Ward (musician) =

American musician (1976–2003)

- Ward with De Facto

Background information
- Born: Jeremy Michael Ward; May 5, 1976; Fort Worth, Texas, U.S.
- Died: May 25, 2003 (aged 27) Los Angeles, California, U.S.
- Genres: Experimental; dub; noise; reggae; salsa; ambient
- Occupations: Sound technician; vocal operator; musician
- Instruments: Vocals; melodica; effects
- Years active: 1994–2003
- Formerly of: The Mars Volta; De Facto

Jeremy Michael Ward (May 5, 1976 – May 25, 2003) was an American musician and sound technician, best known as the sound technician and vocal operator for The Mars Volta and De Facto.

== Biography ==
Jeremy Ward was born in Fort Worth, Texas and later moved to El Paso. He was a cousin of Jim Ward and was loosely associated with Jim's band At the Drive-In since its formation in 1994. After that band split for the first time in 2001, members Cedric Bixler-Zavala and Omar Rodríguez-López invited Ward to contribute vocals and electronic effects to their interim project De Facto, and then their more permanent band The Mars Volta. He contributed to that group's debut album De-Loused in the Comatorium, and his experimental sound manipulations have been cited as integral to that album's sound.

Less than a month before the album was released, Ward was found dead of an apparent heroin overdose on May 25, 2003, aged 27. Bixler-Zavala and Rodríguez-López have stated that Ward's death inspired them to kick their own addictions. Ward had also worked as a repo man, and his erstwhile bandmates said an anonymous diary which he had found while repossessing a car became the basis for the lyrics in the next Mars Volta album, Frances the Mute (2005). Bixler-Zavala mentioned how the story in the diary paralleled Ward's own life and stated, "If you’re born with a broken heart, then you’ll spend the rest of your life trying to mend it. If you look at a picture of Jeremy when he was 10 and then 27, he has the exact same look in his eyes. A haunted look. He related to the diarist’s loneliness, his disconnectedness."

However, in the 2023 documentary Omar and Cedric: If This Ever Gets Weird, Rodriguez-Lopez confessed the album's concept actually came from a film script he had written and gave to Bixler Zavala for inspiration as the latter was struggling with writer's block. Rodriguez-Lopez also stated the story about the diary was entirely invented as a tribute to Ward.

Some of Ward's experimental recordings were used posthumously on later albums by The Mars Volta and Omar Rodríguez-López. The latter created the full-length albums Omar Rodriguez Lopez & Jeremy Michael Ward and Minor Cuts and Scrapes in the Bushes Ahead from such compositions in 2008. In 2021, The Mars Volta released Landscape Tantrums as part of La Realidad De Los Sueños box set. The demo album features a notable amount of vocal and sound effects which are characteristic of Ward's work.

The documentary Omar and Cedric: If This Ever Gets Weird was released in 2025 and heavily features Ward. Rodríguez-López and Bixler-Zavala relate how Ward was a major influence on the sound and lyrics of The Mars Volta. They also mention the toll his death took on them.

"Palm Full of Crux" from The Mars Volta's self-titled album, was written in tribute to Ward.

== Discography ==
=== With At the Drive-In ===
- In/Casino/Out (1998)

=== With De Facto ===
- De Facto (1999)
- How Do You Dub? You Fight for Dub, You Plug Dub In (2001)
- 456132015 (2001)
- Megaton Shotblast (2001)
- Légende du Scorpion à Quatre Queues (2001)

=== With The Mars Volta ===
- Tremulant (2002)
- De-Loused in the Comatorium (2003)
- Octahedron (2009)
- La Realidad De Los Sueños (2021)
- Landscape Tantrums (2021)

=== With Omar Rodríguez-López ===
- A Manual Dexterity: Soundtrack Volume 1 (2004)
- Omar Rodriguez Lopez & Jeremy Michael Ward (2008)
- Minor Cuts and Scrapes in the Bushes Ahead (2008)
- Telesterion (2011)

== Equipment ==
=== With De Facto ===
- Yamaha QY100
- Electro-Harmonix Frequency Analyzer
- Digitech Multi chorus
- Guyatone MD-3 Digital delay
- Ibanez DE-7 delay/Echo
- Boss DD-6 delay
- Boss HR-2 Harmonist
- Maxon Rotary phaser
- Korg KP2 Kaoss pad
- Voodoo Lab Pedal Power
