= De Facto (band) =

American dub reggae band

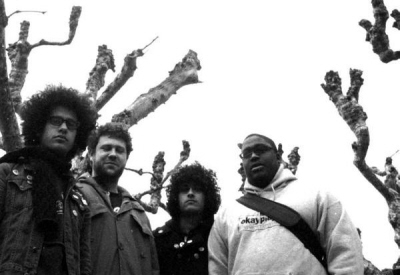
- Left to right: Omar Rodríguez-López, Jeremy Ward, Cedric Bixler-Zavala, Isaiah "Ikey" Owens

Background information
- Origin: El Paso, Texas, U.S.
- Genres: Dub; electronica; reggae; salsa
- Years active: 1998–2003; 2024
- Labels: Grand Royal; Gold Standard
- Spinoffs: The Mars Volta
- Spinoff of: At the Drive-In
- Past members: Cedric Bixler-Zavala; Omar Rodríguez-López; Jeremy Ward; Ikey Owens; Marcel Rodriguez-Lopez; Teri Gender Bender; Ralph Jasso

De Facto (alternatively spelled as DeFacto) was an American dub reggae band which has included Cedric Bixler-Zavala, Omar Rodríguez-López, Isaiah "Ikey" Owens and Jeremy Ward.

== History ==
The band began as small jam sessions after At the Drive-In shows. The original band consisted of Rodríguez-López, Bixler-Zavala, and Ward playing local shows around their hometown, El Paso, Texas. Bixler-Zavala said, "Yeah, actually, we used to be called the Sphinktators, that was early De Facto, just more rock." Rodríguez-López was the vocalist of the Sphinktators and remembers, "We used psychedelic sounds, Cedric played the bass, Jeremy played guitar, and Ralph Jasso played drums."

For their first recording, they brainstormed the name De Facto Cadre Dub, which was later shortened to De Facto. The lineup of the band was switched around: Bixler-Zavala played drums like he did before in his earlier bands Foss and Los Dregtones, Rodríguez-López played bass, and Ward ran samples, sang, and did sparse guitar work. Ralph Jasso moved to keyboards but soon quit the band. The self-titled recording was released as a very limited vinyl pressing in 1999; it would be re-released in 2001 as How Do You Dub? You Fight for Dub. You Plug Dub In., through Headquarter Records, now known as Restart Records. Rodríguez-López met Ikey Owens at a hip hop show. They exchanged numbers, and then Owens met up with them during one of their shows and joined De Facto as their keyboard player midshow. After relocating to the West Coast, Owens joined the band full-time.

Following the break-up of At the Drive-in in 2001, Rodríguez-López and Bixler-Zavala switched their focus to working on De Facto. That year eventually saw all the band's releases come out, starting with 456132015 EP produced by Mario Caldato Jr. De Facto's first full-length album, ¡Megaton Shotblast! was released on the Gold Standard Laboratories label, and received moderate success, likely in part due to the popularity of At the Drive-In. Légende du Scorpion à Quatre Queues, which would be the last De Facto album, followed the same year, released through Modern City Records. Both albums combined the band's studio recordings made in 2000 with live recordings from the European tour in 2001.

In 2001, the members of the band teamed up with bassist Eva Gardner and drummer Blake Fleming to form The Mars Volta. Despite this, De Facto continued to play live shows in the following years. During that time, Rodríguez-López met John Frusciante at one of the shows, and the two became friends; Frusciante once joined De Facto on stage as a guest guitarist. The band, however, did not put out any new material after 2001, and following the death of Jeremy Ward in May 2003 due to drug overdose.

In a radio interview conducted by Radionica Colombia on October 28, 2008, Cedric Bixler-Zavala revealed that after returning from the South American leg of the current Mars Volta tour, new De Facto material might possibly be recorded. In the same interview, Bixler-Zavala also stated that he would be returning to the drums for the production. To date, it has not been confirmed if the sessions actually happened.

Since 2001, the only new De Facto release was live footage from a January 3, 2001, show at The Smell, Los Angeles, included on the Gold Standard Laboratories DVD GSL Lab Results Vol. 1 Live in 2007. Rodriguez-Lopez, however, mentioned the possibility of releasing a documentary from the band's European tours, as well as previously unreleased tracks from Mario Caldato Jr. sessions.

Ikey Owens died of a heart attack in 2014, while on tour with Jack White.

In March 2024, more than 20 years after the band went on indefinite hiatus, Omar and Cedric played a surprise "reunion" show at the SXSW festival, a one-off promotional event that coincided with the North American premiere of the documentary Omar and Cedric: If This Ever Gets Weird. The band performed on the same night with Mogwai, an acclaimed Scottish post-rock band that likewise premiered a biographical documentary, If the Stars Had a Sound, at South by Southwest. Substituting for deceased members, Marcel Rodríguez-López appeared on keyboards, and Teri Gender Bender joined as a featured guest on background vocals. The band performed five original De Facto songs and four songs from Teri Gender Bender's discography. Another song titled, Lately, also appeared on the setlist but it is unclear if the song was actually played.

== Influences and genres ==
De Facto's general style was instrumental dub, influenced by the heady sounds of the likes of King Tubby and Lee "Scratch" Perry. However, they also dabbled in electronica, Latin and salsa music, and jazz fusion. The band's writing process was largely improvisational, based on an exchange of ideas using drum and bass rhythms as the songs' spines. Many of those ideas later led to what would become the members' next band, The Mars Volta.

== Band members ==
- Omar Rodríguez-López – bass (1998–2003, 2024)
- Cedric Bixler-Zavala – drums, vocals (1998–2003, 2024)
- Jeremy Ward – sound manipulation, vocals, melodica (1998–2003; his death)
- Ralph Jasso – keyboards (1998–1999)
- Isaiah "Ikey" Owens – keyboards, melodica (2000–2003; died 2014)
- Marcel Rodríguez-López – keyboards, synthesizers (2024)
- Teri Gender Bender – vocals (2024)

== Discography ==
=== Albums ===
- ¡Megaton Shotblast! (2001)
- Légende du Scorpion à Quatre Queues (2001)

=== EPs ===
- De Facto (1999)
- 456132015 (2001)
- How Do You Dub? You Fight for Dub. You Plug Dub In. (2001)

=== Singles ===
- "120E7" (2001)

=== Appears on ===
- Test Four (CD) 120 E7 Nova Records 2001
- Test the Box (5xCD) 120 E7 Nova Records 2001
- Audioflashcard (CD, comp) Gold Standard Labs

== See also ==
- At the Drive-In
- The Mars Volta

== See also ==
- List of ambient music artists
