= The Locust =

American grindcore band (1994–2022)

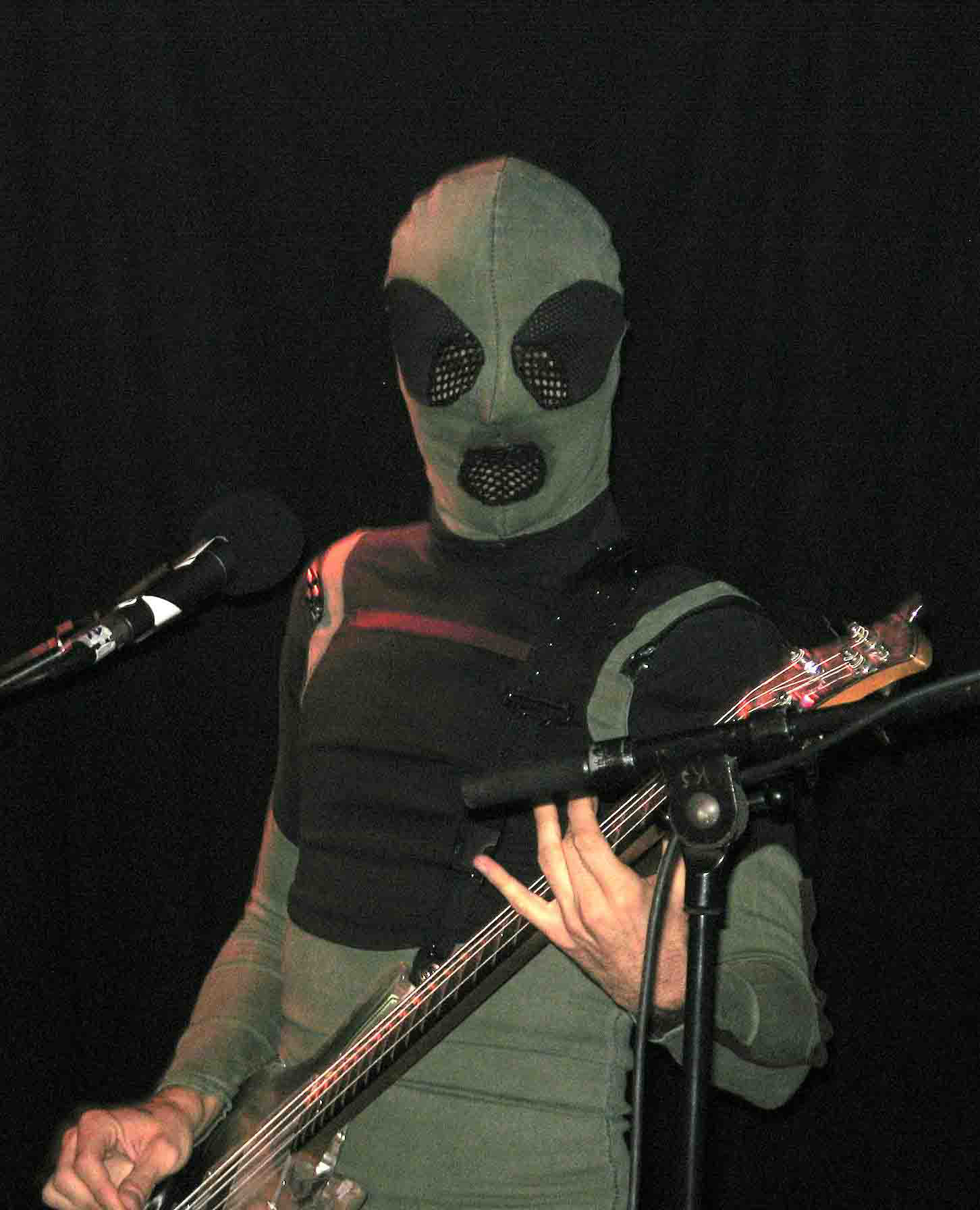
- Bassist Justin Pearson in concert

Background information
- Origin: San Diego, California, U.S.
- Genres: Grindcore; white belt grind; mathcore; powerviolence; noise rock
- Years active: 1994–2022
- Labels: Gold Standard Laboratories; Three One G; ANTI-
- Past members: Bobby Bray; Justin Pearson; Joey Karam; Dylan Scharf; Dave Warshaw; Dave Astor; Jimmy LaValle; Gabe Serbian

The Locust was an American hardcore punk band from San Diego, California, known for their mix of grindcore aggression and new wave experimentation.

The band has been noted for their use of insect costumes when performing live.

== History ==
Prior to The Locust founding members Justin Pearson and Dylan Scharf were in the hardcore punk band Struggle together, formed in late 1990. The band only lasted three years. Despite this they had opportunities to share musical space with other significant bands with similar ideological perspectives such as Born Against, Downcast, Bikini Kill, and Econochrist. The band disbanded in 1994.

The Locust formed in 1994 by Pearson, Scharf, Bobby Bray, Dave Warshaw, and Dave Astor. The band was initially a powerviolence project whose first release was a split with genre pioneers Man Is the Bastard in 1995. Later releases incorporated synthesizers and became increasingly theatrical. The band regularly played shows in all-ages punk clubs in Los Angeles and San Diego, usually donning insect costumes.

In September 1998, The Locust released their first full-length album, The Locust, through Gold Standard Laboratories.

On June 24, 2003, The Locust released their second full-length album, Plague Soundscapes, through ANTI-.

On March 20, 2007, The Locust released their third and ultimately final full-length album, New Erections, through ANTI-. After a lengthy touring schedule following the release of New Erections, The Locust went on hiatus.

On May 18, 2010, The Locust released an archive recording of their Peel Session recorded 9 years prior in 2001, simply named The Peel Sessions, released through Radio Surgery. This 16-track recording was the first time Gabe Serbian had started playing drums for The Locust, finalizing the lineup of Bobby Bray, Joey Karam, Justin Pearson and Gabe Serbian that would stay the same for the rest of their time together.

On July 31, 2012, The Locust released a compilation album, Molecular Genetics from the Gold Standard Labs, through ANTI-. The album contains all the band's material released on the Gold Standard Laboratories label which is all their material from 1997 to 2002.

In 2013, The Locust returned from hiatus and in 2019 they were added to the Desert Daze 2019 festival line up. Bassist Justin Pearson confirmed that the band would add more shows after this, with new material and new costumes.

On May 1, 2022, the band announced the death of drummer Gabe Serbian that had occurred the day before. The band have since announced on their Instagram account that they can no longer be active in the wake of Serbian's death, and that no further albums or live performances will occur under the Locust name. The final piece recorded by the group was a remix of the Danny Elfman solo track "Cruel Compensation" which appears on the remix album Bigger. Messier..

== Style and influences ==
The Locust were known for their unique mix of grindcore speed and aggression, complexity, and new wave weirdness. The band's musical genre is typically described as grindcore, hardcore punk, powerviolence, mathcore and noise rock.

About the band's aesthetic, vocalist/bassist Justin Pearson has said, "I wanted to change the way people perceive music, or maybe just destroy it in general." The Locust's music is complex, dynamic and fast-paced, often featuring abrupt and inconsistent time-signature changes. These erratic elements are, according to vocalist/guitarist Bobby Bray, "a reflection of perhaps how our brains have to function in order to be able to do anything in the Western societies we live in." Stylus described the band's sound as "Relentless blitzkriegs of high velocity noise, skinny tie keyboards and bloody screaming that often last less than a minute, Locust songs are tightly-wound, dynamic and bizarre expressions of frustration and hatred whose intensity and creativity are currently unparalleled in punk rock." The New York Times stated "If noise-rock had superheroes, the Locust would surely be among them." The band was praised by Dave Lombardo of Slayer, who said "There's a band called The Locust. Their drummer is named Gabe Serbian, and their music hits me now like D.R.I. hit me in the early '80s."

The Locust have had a unique stage presence: costumed in skin-tight, full body nylon suits (which the band refer to as uniforms). The last 5 different suits were designed and made by Ben Warwas. Unlike most bands, which normally have the drums set up behind the other members, the four members of The Locust usually all positioned in a line at the front of the stage. The group recommended that in order to get the full impact of the music, one should see them live.

The Locust boycotted Clear Channel Communications and refused to play in any Clear Channel-owned venues. This boycott affected a 2005 tour with Fantômas, as well as another tour with Yeah Yeah Yeahs. They also had a policy of only playing all-ages shows.

=== Equipment ===
Karam plays an assortment of analog synthesizers, including various Moog models and a patch-panel modular synth. Bray plays a Gibson SG, and Pearson plays a see-through body Dan Armstrong bass made by Ampeg. Serbian played Ludwig drums with Paiste cymbals.

== Controversies ==
Pearson appeared as a "rock-star slut" in an episode of The Jerry Springer Show. It culminated in a French kiss with Scott Beiben, owner of the record label Bloodlink. Pearson wore a T-shirt for The Locust during the appearance. Pearson later stated "I was beat up during a commercial break by one of the 'security guards' pretty bad for blowing snot on the carpet."

The Locust have been accused of encouraging the use of drugs because the band sold vanity mirrors as merchandise: fans and others mistook the mirrors as being intended for use as a surface from which one could snort cocaine. In an interview with Scene Point Blank Justin Pearson was asked "You guys make Locust compacts, modeled after cocaine mirrors. Do you feel it's irresponsible to sell these to your younger fans?" Pearson responded "I'm not sure what you are talking about. I have never done cocaine and we never modeled any sort of merchandising product or idea after cocaine mirrors. However we did have vanity mirrors. In case you were not aware, they could be used for a variety of things such as make-up application, picking food out of your teeth, popping zits, fixing your bangs, etc. About the second part of your question, we are not responsible for anyone besides ourselves. We are a band and in no way are we a babysitting service."

The Locust organized a number of "gender-baiting incidents", including Pearson and Serbian staging a fake same-sex marriage while on tour in Hawaii.

== In media ==
- "Nice Tranquil Thumbs in Mouth" and "An Extra Piece of Dead Meat" are featured in the film Cecil B. Demented.
- In the 2011 cult film Margaret, a poster featuring the cover of Safety Second, Body Last can be seen in various scenes set in the protagonist's bedroom.
- The Hold Steady song “Girls Like Status” includes the lyric “She said that she was coming but she mostly made hard, fast noises It kinda sounded like The Locust”

== Members ==
=== Final lineup ===
- Bobby Bray – guitar, vocals (1994–2022)
- Justin Pearson – bass, vocals (1994–2022)
- Joey Karam – keyboards, vocals (1997–2022)
- Gabe Serbian – guitar, vocals (1998–2001), drums (2001–2022; his death)

=== Previous members ===
- Dylan Scharf – guitar, vocals (1994–1996)
- Dave Warshaw – keyboards, vocals (1994–1996)
- Dave Astor – drums (1994–2001)
- Jimmy LaValle – keyboards, vocals (1996–1998)

== Discography ==
=== Albums ===
- The Locust (1998, Gold Standard Laboratories)
- Plague Soundscapes (2003, ANTI-)
- New Erections (2007, ANTI-)

=== Compilations ===
- Molecular Genetics from the Gold Standard Labs (2012, ANTI-)

=== Live albums ===
- The Peel Sessions (2010, Radio Surgery)

=== EPs ===
- The Locust (1997, Gold Standard Laboratories)
- Flight of the Wounded Locust (2001, Gold Standard Laboratories)
- Well I'll Be a Monkey's Uncle (2002, Gold Standard Laboratories)
- Follow the Flock, Step in Shit (2003, Three One G)
- Safety Second, Body Last (2005, Radio Surgery)

=== Splits ===
- Split with Man Is the Bastard (1995, King of the Monsters)
- Split with Jenny Piccolo (1996, Three One G)
- Split with Arab on Radar (2000, Gold Standard Laboratories)
- Split with Melt-Banana (2002, Gold Standard Laboratories)

=== Compilation appearances ===
- "Red" on Cry Now, Cry Later Volume 4 (1996, Theologian Records)
- "Emaciation Fuckers" on Fiesta Comes Alive! (1997, Slap A Ham Records)
- "Cattle Mutilation" on Benefit 7" for Project Vida (1997, Lengua Armada Discos)
- "Ass Gravity" on The 51 Comp (1997, Join The Team Player Records)
- "Inbred America" on Bread: The Edible Napkin (1997, No Idea Records)
- "Kill Roger Hedgecock" on Israfel (1997, Ape Records)
- "Do You Dig Deep Graves" on Bllleeeeaaauuurrrrgghhh!: A Music War (1998, Slap A Ham Records)
- "Skin Graft at Seventy-Five Miles Per Hour" on Bottlenekk Wholesale Distribution Sampler No. 1: Fall 1998 (1998, Bottlenekk Wholesale Distribution)
- "Prepare to Qualify" on Audio Terrorism: The Soundtrack for Weirdness and Blind Hostility (1998, Heart plug Records/Chaotic Noise Productions/Satan's Pimp)
- "Dog Without A Collar" on Reality Part 3 (1999, Deep Six Records)
- "Nice Tranquil Thumb In Mouth" on Music from the Motion Picture Cecil B. Demented (2000, RCA Victor)
- "Keep Off The Tracks" on Songs of the Dead II: Idle Hands (2000, And Here My Troubles Began)
- "Straight From The Horse's Mouth" on KXLU 88.9 FM Los Angeles Live Volume Five (2000, KXLU)
- "Priest with the Sexually Transmitted Diseases, Get Out Of My Bed" on Looking for the Perfect Glass: California Post Punk (U.S. Pop Life Vol. 11) (2001, Contact Records)
- "The Perils of Believing in Round Squares" on Troubleman Mixtape (2001, Troubleman Unlimited)
- "Glueing Carpet To Your Genitals Does Not Make You A Cantaloupe" on 2001 Sampler (2001, Mordam Records)
- "Turning Your Merchandise Into A Ripped Wall of Mini-Abs" on This Is Radio Cookie Scene 11/2001 (2001, Cookie Scene)
- "Flash's Theme" on Dynamite With A Laserbeam: Queen As Heard Through The Meat Grinder of Three One G (2002, Three One G)
- "Glueing Carpet To Your..." on Audioflashcard (2002, Gold Standard Laboratories)
- "How To Become A Virgin" on Oops! The Tour Sampler (2002)
- "Perils of Believing in Round Squares" on Our Birthday Your Present (2003, Gold Standard Laboratories)
- "Identity Exchange Program, Rectum Return Policy" on Rock Sound Volume 65 (2003, Rock Sound)
- "Identity Exchange Program, Rectum Return Policy" on Speciale Punk Rock 17 (2003, Rock Sound)
- "Identity Exchange Program, Rectum Return Policy" on Rock Sound Musica Com Atitude Volume 12 (2003, Rock Sound)
- "Identity Exchange Program, Rectum Return Policy" on Soundcheck #59 (2003, Close-Up Magazine)
- "Pulling the Christmas Pig by the Wrong Pair of Ears" on Keeper Metal CD Sampler 2 (2003, Keeper Music)
- "The Half Eaten Sausage Would Like To See You In His Office" on Gravity Video 2 Soundtrack (2003, Gravity)
- "Identity Exchange Program, Rectum Return Policy" on Music with Attitudes: Volume 50 (2003, Rock Sound)
- "File Under 'Soft Core Seizures'" on Pushing Product (Winter 2003/2004) (2003, Vice Records)
- "Identity Exchange Program, Rectum Return Policy" on Anti- (2004, Anti-/Sinedin Music)
- "Stucco Obelisks Labeled As Trees" on This Is Circumstantial Evidence (2004, Three One G)
- "Teenage Mustache" on Hellfest Vol. III (2004, High Roller Studio)
- "Get Off The Cross, The Wood Is Needed" on Burn My Eye! (2004, Burn My Eye/Plastic Donkey/Rimbaud Records)
- "Live in Japan" on Lab Results Volume One (2006, Gold Standard Laboratories)
- "Live from the Russian Compound" on Punk is Dead (2006, Buddyhead)
- "We Have Reached An Official Verdict: Nobody Gives A Shit" on Sound Check No. 95 (2007, Rock Sound)
- "We Have Reached An Official Verdict: Nobody Gives A Shit" on Ox-Compilation #71 (2007, Ox Fanzine)
- "We Have Reached An Official" on Epitaph - Spring Sampler 2007 (2007, Epitaph Records)
- "Red" on Three One G 2007 (2007, Three One G)
- "We Have Reached An Official Verdict: Nobody Gives A Shit" on Rock Sound Volume 109 (2007, Rock Sound)
- "We Have Reached An Official Verdict" on Rock Sound Volume 119 (2007, Rock Sound)
- "Tower of Mammal" on Hit's A Sony Music Express Vol.49 March 2007 (2007, Sony Records International)
- "Summer Rain" on Summer 2007 Chrysalis Music Sampler (2007, Chrysalis Music Group)
- "Aotkpta" on Hit's A Sony Music Express Vol.60 March 2008 (2008, Sony Records International)
- "Untitled" on A Few My Nephew (2008)
- "Strike Back (DJ Yoz Remix)" on Ultimate Hardstyle Volume 3 (2012, LW Recordings)
- "Sever The Toes" on It's Gonna Blow: San Diego's Music Underground 1986-1996 (2014, Billingsgate Media)
