= Gold Standard Laboratories =

Defunct independent record label

- Founded: 1993
- Founder: Sonny Kay
- Defunct: 2007
- Status: Defunct
- Genre: Punk, Progressive, Experimental
- Country of origin: United States
- Location: Los Angeles, California, USA.

Gold Standard Laboratories or GSL was an independent record label which was founded in 1993 in Boulder, Colorado by Sonny Kay. In 2000, it was relocated to San Diego, California, United States, and two years later, to Los Angeles. It was headquartered in L.A. until closing its doors on October 29, 2007.

Beginning in 2001, GSL was co-owned by The Mars Volta's Omar Rodríguez-López.

== Artists ==
Bands appearing on GSL:

- !!!
- 400 Blows
- '57 Lesbian
- A Luna Red
- An Albatross
- Anavan
- Arab On Radar
- Armatron
- Attractive and Popular
- Beautiful Skin
- Big Sir
- Bunny Genghis
- Chromatics
- Crime in Choir
- Coaxial
- The Convocation Of...
- Cut City
- Dead and Gone
- De Facto
- Die Princess Die
- Demonstrations
- Fatal Flyin' Guillotines
- The Faint
- Favourite Sons
- Free Moral Agents
- Get Hustle
- GoGoGo Airheart
- Heart of Snow
- The Holy Kiss
- I Am Spoonbender
- Indian Jewelry
- Jaga Jazzist
- The Jai-Alai Savant
- JR Ewing
- Juhl
- Kill Me Tomorrow
- Le Shok
- The Locust
- Lost Kids
- Malcriada
- The Mars Volta
- Meanface
- Melt-Banana
- Mohinder
- Neon King Kong
- Omar A. Rodríguez-López
- Omega Cinco
- Out Hud
- The Pattern
- The Phantom Limbs
- Physics
- Pleasure Forever
- The Rapture
- Red Eyed Legends
- Rhythm of Black Lines
- SABERTOOTH . TIGER
- Semiautomatic
- Soiled Doves
- The Starlite Desperation
- The Starvations
- The Stitches
- Subpoena the Past
- Subtitle
- Sunshine
- Tender Buttons
- Triclops!
- The Vanishing
- Vaz
- Veronica Lipgloss & The Evil Eyes
- The VSS
- Vue
- With Love
- Woodpussy
- XBXRX
- Xiu Xiu
- Year Future
