= List of 2015 albums =

The following is a list of albums, EPs, and mixtapes released in 2015. These albums are (1) original, i.e. excluding reissues, remasters, and compilations of previously released recordings, and (2) notable, defined as having received significant coverage from reliable sources independent of the subject.

For additional information about bands formed, reformed, or disbanded, for deaths of musicians, and for links to musical awards, see 2015 in music.

== First quarter ==
=== January ===
List of albums released in January 2015
Go to: January | February | March | April | May | June | July | August | September | October | November | December | Back to top
Release date	Artist	Album	Genre	Label	Ref.
January 4	Death Grips	Fashion Week	Instrumental hip-hop, industrial, IDM	Third Worlds	
January 5	Låpsley	Understudy		XL	
January 6	Rae Sremmurd	SremmLife	Hip-hop	Ear Drummer, Interscope	
January 9	Meghan Trainor	Title	R&B, doo-wop, pop	Epic	
January 9	Panda Bear	Panda Bear Meets the Grim Reaper	Psychedelia, electropop	Domino	
January 12	Sylosis	Dormant Heart		Nuclear Blast	
January 13	Dan Mangan	Club Meds	Indie folk, indie rock	Arts & Crafts	
January 13	DMX	Redemption of the Beast	East Coast hip-hop, hardcore hip-hop	Seven Arts Music, Fontana	
January 13	Guster	Evermotion	Indie rock, alternative rock	Ocho Mule, Nettwerk	
January 13	Jazmine Sullivan	Reality Show	R&B	RCA	
January 13	Justin Townes Earle	Absent Fathers	Country	Vagrant, Loose	
January 13	Kat Dahlia	My Garden	Alternative R&B, hip-hop	Epic, Vested in Culture	
January 13	Mark Ronson	Uptown Special	Funk, R&B	Columbia	
January 13	Palisades	Mind Games	Electronicore, EDM, post-hardcore	Rise	
January 15	Future and Zaytoven	Beast Mode	Hip-hop, trap	Freebandz	
January 15	Marilyn Manson	The Pale Emperor	Gothic metal, blues rock, hard rock	Hell, etc.	
January 16	Mikky Ekko	Time	Pop	RCA	
January 19	The Avener	The Wanderings of the Avener	Electronic	Capitol	
January 19	Belle and Sebastian	Girls in Peacetime Want to Dance	Indie pop	Matador	
January 19	Funeral for a Friend	Chapter and Verse	Post-hardcore, melodic hardcore	Distiller Records	
January 19	The Waterboys	Modern Blues		Harlequin and Clown	
January 20	Björk	Vulnicura	Electronic, avant-garde, ambient	One Little Indian, Megaforce	
January 20	The Decemberists	What a Terrible World, What a Beautiful World	Indie rock	Capitol	
January 20	Enter Shikari	The Mindsweep	Post-hardcore, alternative rock	Ambush Reality, Hopeless	
January 20	Fall Out Boy	American Beauty/American Psycho	Pop-punk, pop rock, arena rock	DCD2, Island	
January 20	Joey Badass	B4.Da.$$	East Coast hip-hop, conscious hip-hop	Cinematic Music	
January 20	Lil Wayne	Sorry 4 the Wait 2	Hip-hop	Young Money	
January 20	Lupe Fiasco	Tetsuo & Youth	Hip-hop	Atlantic, 1st & 15th Entertainment	
January 20	Sleater-Kinney	No Cities to Love	Punk rock, indie rock, post-punk	Sub Pop	
January 20	Terje Isungset	Meditation	Jazz	All Ice	
January 20	Viet Cong	Viet Cong	Post-punk, art rock	Jagjaguwar	
January 21	AKB48	Koko ga Rhodes da, Koko de Tobe!	J-pop	You! Be Cool, King Records	
January 23	Aphex Twin	Computer Controlled Acoustic Instruments pt2	Breakbeat, avant-garde jazz	Warp	
January 23	Hardwell	United We Are		Revealed, Sony, Ultra	
January 23	Napalm Death	Apex Predator – Easy Meat	Grindcore, deathgrind	Century Media	
January 23	Pond	Man It Feels Like Space Again	Psychedelic rock	Caroline	
January 26	The Charlatans	Modern Nature	Indie rock	BMG	
January 26	Rae Morris	Unguarded		Atlantic	
January 27	Bettye LaVette	Worthy	Blues	Cherry Red	
January 27	Doomtree	All Hands	Hip-hop	Doomtree	
January 27	Jessica Pratt	On Your Own Love Again		Drag City	
January 27	Natalie Prass	Natalie Prass	Indie pop, baroque pop	Spacebomb, Startime International, Caroline International	
January 27	Ne-Yo	Non-Fiction	R&B	Compound, Motown	
January 27	Papa Roach	F.E.A.R.	Hard rock, alternative metal	Eleven Seven	
January 27	Periphery	Juggernaut: Alpha	Progressive metal	Sumerian	
January 27	Periphery	Juggernaut: Omega	Progressive metal	Sumerian	
January 27	Punch Brothers	The Phosphorescent Blues	Progressive bluegrass	Nonesuch	
January 27	Venom	From the Very Depths	Heavy metal, thrash metal	Spinefarm	
January 27	Young Ejecta	The Planet	Synth-pop	Driftless Recordings	
January 30	Blind Guardian	Beyond the Red Mirror	Power metal progressive metal, symphonic metal	Nuclear Blast	
January 30	Callisto	Secret Youth			
January 30	Fifth Harmony	Reflection	Pop, R&B, dance	Syco, Epic	
January 30	Kid Ink	Full Speed	Hip-hop	Tha Alumni Music Group, 88 Classic, RCA	
January 30	Marius Neset	Pinball	Jazz	ACT	
January 30	Mopti & Bendik Baksaas	Bits & Pieces	Jazz	Jazzland	

=== February ===
List of albums released in February 2015
Go to: January | February | March | April | May | June | July | August | September | October | November | December | Back to top
Release date	Artist	Album	Genre	Label	Ref.
February 2	Cornershop	Hold On It's Easy		Ample Play Records	
February 3	Bob Dylan	Shadows in the Night	Traditional pop	Columbia	
February 3	Bob Marley and the Wailers	Easy Skanking in Boston '78	Reggae	Island, Tuff Gong	
February 3	BridgeCity	Christ Be Glorified	Contemporary worship, electronic	Maranatha! Music	
February 3	Diana Krall	Wallflower	Jazz	Verve	
February 3	Hayley Kiyoko	This Side of Paradise	Pop	Steel Wool	
February 3	Ivy Queen	Vendetta	Hip-hop, bachata, salsa	Universal Music Latino	
February 3	Lodovica Comello	Mariposa	Pop, rock	Sony Music	
February 3	Mount Eerie	Sauna	Experimental, indie rock, ambient	P. W. Elverum & Sun	
February 3	Murder by Death	Big Dark Love	Rock	Bloodshot	
February 3	The Notwist	The Messier Objects	Electronic	Alien Transistor	
February 3	RuPaul	RuPaul Presents: CoverGurlz2	Dance	World of Wonder	
February 3	Title Fight	Hyperview	Shoegaze	Anti-	
February 7	Jesika von Rabbit	Journey Mitchell	Pop, electro, electropop	Royal Order	
February 9	Father John Misty	I Love You, Honeybear	Indie rock	Sub Pop	
February 9	Kodaline	Coming Up for Air	Alternative rock, indie rock, indie pop	B-Unique, SME	
February 9	Peace	Happy People	Indie rock	Columbia	
February 9	The Unthanks	Mount the Air	Folk	Rabble Rouser	
February 10	Brandon Heath	No Turning Back	CCM	Reunion, Monomode Records	
February 10	Caught on Tape	Full Bleed	Free improvisation, noise, black metal	Northern Spy	
February 10	Michelle Chamuel	Face the Fire	Pop	The End	
February 10	The Neal Morse Band	The Grand Experiment	Progressive rock	InsideOut, Metal Blade	
February 10	Ricky Martin	A Quien Quiera Escuchar	Latin pop	Sony Music Latin	
February 10	Stick to Your Guns	Disobedient	Melodic hardcore, metalcore	Sumerian	
February 10	Vijay Iyer Trio	Break Stuff	Jazz	ECM	
February 11	One Ok Rock	35xxxv	Alternative rock	A-Sketch	
February 13	Drake	If You're Reading This It's Too Late	Hip-hop	Cash Money, OVO Sound, Republic	
February 13	Elle King	Love Stuff	Alternative country, blues rock	RCA	
February 13	A Night in Texas	The God Delusion		Skulls and Bones	
February 14	Vision Eternel	Echoes from Forgotten Hearts		Abridged Pause Recordings	
February 15	Future Brown	Future Brown	Electronica	Warp	
February 16	Carl Barât and the Jackals	Let It Reign	Rock	Cooking Vinyl	
February 16	Steve Earle	Terraplane	Blues	New West	
February 16	Susanne Sundfør	Ten Love Songs	Art pop, electropop, baroque pop	Warner Music Norway	
February 17	Estelle	True Romance	R&B	Established 1980 Records.	
February 17	Ibeyi	Ibeyi	Downtempo, neo soul, art pop	XL	
February 17	Imagine Dragons	Smoke + Mirrors	Pop rock, alternative rock	Kidinakorner, Interscope	
February 17	José González	Vestiges & Claws		Mute	
February 17	The Mavericks	Mono	Americana		
February 17	A Place to Bury Strangers	Transfixiation	Noise rock	Dead Oceans	
February 17	Raheem DeVaughn	Love Sex Passion	R&B	eOne Music	
February 17	Six Organs of Admittance	Hexadic		Drag City	
February 17	Sumac	The Deal	Post-metal, sludge metal	Profound Lore, SIGE Records	
February 17	Tigran Hamasyan	Mockroot		Nonesuch	
February 20	Chris Brown & Tyga	Fan of a Fan: The Album	R&B, West Coast hip-hop	RCA	
February 20	Ensiferum	One Man Army	Folk metal, melodic death metal, viking metal	Metal Blade	
February 20	Scorpions	Return to Forever	Hard rock		
February 23	Clare Maguire	Don't Mess Me Around	British soul, pop	Virgin EMI	
February 23	Dutch Uncles	O Shudder	Indie rock, indie pop	Memphis Industries	
February 23	Public Service Broadcasting	The Race for Space	Alternative rock, electronic, indie rock	Test Card Recordings	
February 23	UFO	A Conspiracy of Stars	Hard rock, heavy metal	SPV	
February 24	All That Remains	The Order of Things		Razor & Tie	
February 24	BadBadNotGood & Ghostface Killah	Sour Soul	Hip-hop, jazz fusion	Lex	
February 24	Big Sean	Dark Sky Paradise	Hip-hop	GOOD Music, Def Jam	
February 24	The Black Ryder	The Door Behind the Door		The Anti-Machine Machine	
February 24	Dan Deacon	Gliss Riffer	Indietronica	Domino	
February 24	Eartheater	Metalepsis	Electroacoustic, freak folk	Hausu Mountain	
February 24	Emile Haynie	We Fall	Indie rock	Interscope	
February 24	Falling in Reverse	Just Like You	Post-hardcore, pop-punk, metalcore	Epitaph	
February 24	Fashawn	The Ecology	Hip-hop	Mass Appeal, Sony Music, RED	
February 24	Future User	SteroidsOrHeroin	Prog, tronic, hip-hop, punk rock	Middle Ring Partnership	
February 24	Gang of Four	What Happens Next	Industrial rock	Metropolis, Membran	
February 24	James McMurtry	Complicated Game	Americana	Complicated Game Records	
February 24	JJ Grey & Mofro	Ol' Glory		Provogue	
February 24	Kid Rock	First Kiss	Country rock	Warner Bros.	
February 24	Make Do and Mend	Don't Be Long		Rise	
February 24	Marta Sánchez	21 Días		Entrearte	
February 24	MisterWives	Our Own House	Pop rock	Photo Finish	
February 24	Oceans Ate Alaska	Lost Isles		Fearless	
February 24	Pelican	The Cliff	Post-metal	Southern Lord	
February 24	Red	Of Beauty and Rage	Alternative rock, Christian rock	Essential	
February 24	Screaming Females	Rose Mountain	Indie rock, punk	Don Giovanni	
February 25	Angelmaker	Dissentient			
February 25	Noel Gallagher's High Flying Birds	Chasing Yesterday	Alternative rock	Sour Mash	
February 27	AJR	Living Room		AJR Productions, Warner Bros.	
February 27	Jack Ü	Skrillex and Diplo Present Jack Ü	EDM	Owsla, Mad Decent, Atlantic	
February 27	Kelly Clarkson	Piece by Piece	Electropop, orchestral pop, power pop	19, RCA	
February 27	Moon Duo	Shadow of the Sun	Psychedelic rock, garage rock, krautrock	Sacred Bones	
February 27	Nena	Oldschool		Laugh and Peas	
February 27	Purity Ring	Another Eternity	Electronic	4AD	
February 27	Steven Wilson	Hand. Cannot. Erase.	Progressive rock	Kscope	

=== March ===
List of albums released in March 2015
Go to: January | February | March | April | May | June | July | August | September | October | November | December | Back to top
Release date	Artist	Album	Genre	Label	Ref.
March 2	Clarence Clarity	No Now		Bella Union	
March 2	of Montreal	Aureate Gloom	Glam rock	Polyvinyl	
March 2	RuPaul	Realness	Dance, deep house	RuCo Inc.	
March 2	To Kill a King	To Kill a King	Rock	Xtra Mile	
March 3	Brandi Carlile	The Firewatcher's Daughter		ATO	
March 3	Cannibal Ox	Blade of the Ronin	Hip-hop	I.G.C. Records, iHipHop	
March 3	Jeff Rosenstock	We Cool?	Punk rock, indie rock, power pop	SideOneDummy	
March 3	Rixton	Let the Road	Pop, R&B	School Boy, Giant Little Man, Mad Love, Interscope	
March 3	Shania Twain	Still the One: Live from Vegas		Mercury Nashville	
March 3	Swervedriver	I Wasn't Born to Lose You	Alternative rock, indie rock, shoegaze	Cobraside, Dine Alone	
March 3	Yonatan Gat	Director	Psychedelic rock	Joyful Noise	
March 6	Ace of Base	Hidden Gems	Pop	Playground	
March 6	Blue	Colours	Pop, soul	Sony Music	
March 6	Madonna	Rebel Heart	Pop	Live Nation	
March 9	Fawn Spots	From Safer Place	Hardcore punk, post-punk	Critical Heights	
March 9	Karyn Crisis' Gospel of the Witches	Salem's Wounds	Doom metal	Century Media	
March 10	The Bright Light Social Hour	Space Is Still the Place	Psychedelic rock, indie rock	Frenchkiss, MapleMusic	
March 10	Donna Lewis	Brand New Day		Palmetto	
March 10	Enslaved	In Times	Progressive metal, black metal	Nuclear Blast	
March 10	Heems	Eat Pray Thug	Hip-hop	Megaforce	
March 10	Kevin Max	Broken Temples	Christian	Motion Records	
March 10	Will Butler	Policy	Indie rock, garage rock, indie pop	Merge	
March 13	Damien Leith	Songs from Ireland	Folk	Sony Music Australia	
March 13	Lee Kernaghan	Spirit of the Anzacs	Country	ABC Music	
March 13	Marina and the Diamonds	Froot	Synth-pop, pop	Atlantic, Neon Gold	
March 13	Van Morrison	Duets: Re-working the Catalogue		RCA	
March 15	Kendrick Lamar	To Pimp a Butterfly	Conscious hip-hop	Top Dawg, Aftermath, Interscope	
March 16	Allison Moorer	Down to Believing	Country, folk	eOne Music, Proper	
March 16	Mark Knopfler	Tracker	Rock, folk		
March 16	Taizé Community	Taizé - Music of Unity and Peace	Christian	Deutsche Grammophon	
March 16	Tinashe	Amethyst	Alt-pop		
March 17	Awolnation	Run	Alternative rock, electronic rock	Red Bull	
March 17	Bad News Boys	Bad News Boys		In the Red	
March 17	Félicia Atkinson	A Readymade Ceremony	Experimental	Shelter Press	
March 17	Hawk Nelson	Diamonds	CCM, Christian rock	Fair Trade Services	
March 17	Michael Waldrop	Time Within Itself	Jazz	Origin	
March 17	Modest Mouse	Strangers to Ourselves	Indie rock	Epic	
March 17	Sleeping with Sirens	Madness	Post-hardcore, pop rock	Epitaph	
March 17	Tobias Jesso Jr.	Goon	Indie rock	True Panther Sounds	
March 20	Big Data	2.0	Indie rock	Warner Bros.	
March 20	Courtney Barnett	Sometimes I Sit and Think, and Sometimes I Just Sit	Indie rock	Mom + Pop	
March 20	The Cribs	For All My Sisters	Indie rock	Sonic Blew, Sony RED UK	
March 20	Mathias Eick	Midwest	Jazz	ECM	
March 20	Morissette	Morissette	Pop	Star Music	
March 20	Toto	Toto XIV	Hard rock, pop rock	Frontiers	
March 21	Future	56 Nights	Hip-hop, trap	Freebandz	
March 23	Action Bronson	Mr. Wonderful	Hip-hop	Vice, Atlantic	
March 23	Earl Sweatshirt	I Don't Like Shit, I Don't Go Outside	Hip-hop	Tan Cressida, Columbia	
March 23	The Gentle Storm	The Diary	Symphonic metal	Inside Out	
March 23	James Bay	Chaos and the Calm	Indie	Virgin, Republic	
March 23	Laura Marling	Short Movie	Folk music, folk rock, alternative rock	Virgin	
March 23	Oceano	Ascendants	Deathcore	Earache	
March 23	Seasick Steve	Sonic Soul Surfer	Rock, blues	Caroline International, Bronze Rat	
March 23	Therapy?	Disquiet	Alternative rock, alternative metal	Amazing Record Co.	
March 23	The Staves	If I Was		Atlantic	
March 24	The Go! Team	The Scene Between	Indie pop, noise pop, lo-fi	Memphis Industries	
March 24	Hayden	Hey Love	Indie rock, acoustic music, alternative country	Arts & Crafts	
March 24	Hit the Lights	Summer Bones	Pop-punk	Pure Noise	
March 24	Jam City	Dream a Garden	Electronic, dream pop, psychedelic	Night Slugs	
March 24	The Jon Spencer Blues Explosion	Freedom Tower - No Wave Dance Party 2015	Punk blues, alternative rock	Mom + Pop	
March 24	Lightning Bolt	Fantasy Empire	Noise rock	Thrill Jockey	
March 24	Merzbow, Balázs Pándi, Mats Gustafsson, and Thurston Moore	Cuts of Guilt, Cuts Deeper	Free improvisation, noise	RareNoise	
March 24	Smallpools	Lovetap!	Indie pop	RCA	
March 24	Strung Out	Transmission.Alpha.Delta	Punk rock, post-hardcore, alternative metal	Fat Wreck Chords	
March 25	Buena Vista Social Club	Lost and Found		World Circuit, Nonesuch	
March 25	Nightwish	Endless Forms Most Beautiful	Symphonic power metal	Nuclear Blast	
March 26	Selah Sue	Reason	Soul, R&B	Because Music	
March 27	Madeon	Adventure		Columbia	
March 30	Circa Waves	Young Chasers	Indie rock	Virgin EMI	
March 30	Polar Bear	Same as You	Jazz, electronica	The Leaf Label	
March 30	The Prodigy	The Day Is My Enemy	Big beat, dance-punk, techno	Take Me to the Hospital, Cooking Vinyl	
March 31	Darius Rucker	Southern Style	Country	Capitol Nashville	
March 31	Death Cab for Cutie	Kintsugi	Alternative rock	Atlantic	
March 31	Death Grips	The Powers That B	Experimental hip-hop	Third Worlds, Harvest	
March 31	Godspeed You! Black Emperor	Asunder, Sweet and Other Distress	Post-rock, drone	Constellation	
March 31	Hollywood Undead	Day of the Dead	Rap rock, nu metal, alternative rock	Interscope	
March 31	Lower Dens	Escape from Evil	Indie rock, indie pop, dream pop	Ribbon Music	
March 31	Ludacris	Ludaversal	Hip-hop	Disturbing tha Peace, Def Jam	
March 31	The Maine	American Candy	Pop rock	8123 Records	
March 31	NF	Mansion	Christian hip-hop	Capitol CMG	
March 31	Prong	Songs from the Black Hole	Groove metal, thrash metal	Steamhammer/SPV	
March 31	Ringo Starr	Postcards from Paradise	Rock	UM^{e}	
March 31	Ron Sexsmith	Carousel One	Rock	Compass	
March 31	Ryley Walker	Primrose Green	Psychedelic folk, folk rock	Dead Oceans	
March 31	Scott Weiland and the Wildabouts	Blaster	Rock	Softdrive	
March 31	The Soft Moon	Deeper	Dark wave	Captured Tracks	
March 31	The Sonics	This Is the Sonics	Garage rock	Revox	
March 31	Sufjan Stevens	Carrie & Lowell	Indie folk	Asthmatic Kitty	
March 31	Temperance	Limitless	Power metal, symphonic metal	Scarlet	
March 31	Three Days Grace	Human	Post-grunge, alternative metal	RCA	
March 31	Wale	The Album About Nothing	Hip-hop	Atlantic	

== Second quarter ==
=== April ===
List of albums released in April 2015
Go to: January | February | March | April | May | June | July | August | September | October | November | December | Back to top
Release date	Artist	Album	Genre	Label	Ref.
April 3	Turbowolf	Two Hands	Hard rock	Search and Destroy Records	
April 4	Agnostic Front	The American Dream Died	Hardcore punk	Nuclear Blast	
April 6	Cassandra Wilson	Coming Forth by Day	Jazz	Legacy	
April 6	East India Youth	Culture of Volume	Indietronica, synth-pop, experimental	XL	
April 6	Nadine Shah	Fast Food	Gothic rock	Apollo	
April 6	This Is the Kit	Bashed Out	Folk rock, alternative rock	Brassland	
April 6	Young Fathers	White Men Are Black Men Too	Alternative hip-hop, indie rock, pop	Big Dada	
April 7	All Time Low	Future Hearts	Pop-punk, pop rock, power pop	Hopeless	
April 7	Brian Wilson	No Pier Pressure	Soft rock	Capitol	
April 7	David Sanborn	Time and the River	Jazz, blues	Okeh	
April 7	Duda Brack	É	Alternative rock	Duda Brack	
April 7	Flo Rida	My House	Pop rap	Poe Boy, Atlantic	
April 7	Matt and Kim	New Glow	Indie pop, electronic	Virgin EMI	
April 7	The Mountain Goats	Beat the Champ	Indie rock, indie folk	Merge	
April 7	Poison Idea	Confuse & Conquer	Hardcore punk	Southern Lord	
April 7	Secrets	Renditions	Acoustic	Rise	
April 7	Shlohmo	Dark Red	Electronic	True Panther Sounds	
April 7	Toro y Moi	What For?	Indie rock, psychedelic rock, indie pop	Carpark	
April 7	Trickfinger	Trickfinger	Acid house	Acid Test	
April 7	Waters	What's Real		Vagrant	
April 7	Waxahatchee	Ivy Tripp	Indie rock	Merge, Wichita	
April 8	Ayumi Hamasaki	A One	J-pop	Avex Trax	
April 8	Paper Aeroplanes	Joy			
April 10	Halestorm	Into the Wild Life	Hard rock	Atlantic	
April 10	Mel Parsons	Drylands	Folk-pop, indie folk	Cape Road Recordings, Border Music	
April 10	Villagers	Darling Arithmetic	Indie folk	Domino	
April 12	Shayne Ward	Closer	Pop	MPG	
April 13	Beth Hart	Better Than Home	Blues rock, blues, soul	Provogue, Mascot	
April 13	Calexico	Edge of the Sun	Alternative rock, indie folk, Americana	Anti-	
April 13	Gallows	Desolation Sounds	Hardcore punk, post-punk	Bridge Nine, Venn, PIAS	
April 13	Tyler, the Creator	Cherry Bomb	Hip-hop	Odd Future	
April 13	Wire	Wire	Post-punk, art punk, alternative rock	Pinkflag	
April 13	The Wombats	Glitterbug	Indie rock, alternative dance, post-punk	14th Floor	
April 14	Bosse-de-Nage	All Fours		Profound Lore	
April 14	Dance Gavin Dance	Instant Gratification	Post-hardcore, experimental rock	Rise	
April 14	Dwight Yoakam	Second Hand Heart	Country	Warner Bros. Nashville	
April 14	Eels	Live at Royal Albert Hall	Indie rock	E Works, PIAS	
April 14	Hidden in Plain View	Animal	Emo, pop-punk, post-hardcore	Rise	
April 14	Lauren Daigle	How Can It Be	Contemporary Christian	Centricity	
April 14	Matanza	Pior Cenário Possível	Cowpunk, psychobilly	Deckdisc	
April 14	Needtobreathe	Live from the Woods at Fontanel		Atlantic, Word	
April 14	Reba McEntire	Love Somebody	Country	Nash Icon	
April 14	Sabrina Carpenter	Eyes Wide Open	Pop	Hollywood	
April 14	Shawn Mendes	Handwritten	Pop rock	Island	
April 14	Various artists	Unity: The Latin Tribute to Michael Jackson	Tropical	Universal Music	
April 15	Ayaka	Rainbow Road		A Station	
April 16	Young Thug	Barter 6	Hip-hop	300 Entertainment, Atlantic, Rich Gang	
April 17	Alabama Shakes	Sound & Color	Blues rock, roots rock, soul, Southern rock	ATO, MapleMusic, Rough Trade	
April 17	Apocalyptica	Shadowmaker	Cello rock	Better Noise, Eleven Seven	
April 17	The Black Sorrows	Endless Sleep Chapter 46	Blues rock, soul	Head Records	
April 17	The Black Sorrows	Endless Sleep Chapter 47	Blues rock, soul	Head Records	
April 17	Duplex	Én	Jazz	NorCD	
April 17	Gang of Youths	The Positions	Pop rock	Mosy Recordings	
April 17	Kiske/Somerville	City of Heroes	Heavy metal, hard rock	Frontiers	
April 17	Stan Walker	Truth & Soul	Pop	Sony Music Australia	
April 18	Built to Spill	Untethered Moon	Indie rock	Warner Bros.	
April 20	Passenger	Whispers II	Indie pop, indie folk	Black Crow Records	
April 20	Squarepusher	Damogen Furies	Drum and bass, IDM, drill 'n' bass	Warp	
April 21	10 Years	From Birth to Burial	Alternative metal	Palehorse Records	
April 21	Alesana	Confessions	Metalcore, post-hardcore	Revival Recordings	
April 21	Dustin Kensrue	Carry the Fire	Indie rock	Vagrant	
April 21	Good Riddance	Peace in Our Time		Fat	
April 21	Great Lake Swimmers	A Forest of Arms	Folk rock	Nettwerk	
April 21	Joywave	How Do You Feel Now?		Cultco Music, Hollywood	
April 21	L'Orange and Jeremiah Jae	The Night Took Us In like Family	Hip-hop, jazz rap	Mello Music	
April 21	Mew	+ −	Alternative rock	PIAS	
April 21	Passion Pit	Kindred	Synth-pop, indie pop, Alternative rock	Columbia	
April 21	San Fermin	Jackrabbit		Downtown	
April 21	Speedy Ortiz	Foil Deer		Carpark	
April 21	They Might Be Giants	Glean	Alternative rock	Idlewild Recordings, Lojinx	
April 21	Tom DeLonge	To the Stars... Demos, Odds and Ends	Punk rock, alternative rock	To the Stars	
April 21	Yelawolf	Love Story	Hip-hop	Slumerican, Shady, Interscope	
April 23	From First to Last	Dead Trees	Post-hardcore	Sumerian	
April 25	Pop Will Eat Itself	Anti-Nasty League	Industrial rock, electronic rock	Rumjoint	
April 27	Blur	The Magic Whip	Alternative rock, indie rock	Parlophone	
April 27	The Brian Jonestown Massacre	Musique de Film Imaginé	Neo-psychedelia	A Records	
April 27	Martin Gore	MG	Electronic	Mute	
April 27	The Proclaimers	Let's Hear It for the Dogs	Rock	Cooking Vinyl, Compass	
April 28	Colin Stetson and Sarah Neufeld	Never Were the Way She Was	Experimental, avant-garde jazz, ambient	Constellation	
April 28	Insane Clown Posse	The Marvelous Missing Link: Lost		Psychopathic	
April 28	Kehlani	You Should Be Here	R&B	TSNMI	
April 28	Raekwon	Fly International Luxurious Art	Hip-hop	Ice H2O, Caroline	
April 28	Theory of a Deadman	Angel Acoustic EP	Acoustic	Roadrunner, 604	
April 28	Tyler Farr	Suffer in Peace	Country	Columbia Nashville	
April 28	The Weepies	Sirens	Folk-pop	Nettwerk	
April 28	William Basinski	Cascade		2062 Records	
April 28	William Basinski	The Deluge	Ambient	2062 Records, Temporary Residence	
April 28	Zac Brown Band	Jekyll + Hyde	Southern rock	Big Machine, Republic	
April 29	BTS	The Most Beautiful Moment In Life, Part 1	Hip-hop, dance-pop, R&B	Big Hit	
April 29	Gülşen	Bangır Bangır	Dance, pop	Doğan Music Company	
April 29	Whitesnake	The Purple Album	Hard rock, blues rock	Frontiers	

=== May ===
List of albums released in May 2015
Go to: January | February | March | April | May | June | July | August | September | October | November | December | Back to top
Release date	Artist	Album	Genre	Label	Ref.
May 1	Best Coast	California Nights	Indie pop, alternative rock	Harvest	
May 1	Ciara	Jackie	R&B	Epic	
May 1	Hiatus Kaiyote	Choose Your Weapon	Neo soul, alternative R&B	Flying Buddha Records	
May 1	In Hearts Wake	Skydancer	Metalcore	UNFD	
May 4	Django Django	Born Under Saturn	Art rock	Because Music	
May 4	Hop Along	Painted Shut	Indie rock	Saddle Creek	
May 4	Tech N9ne	Special Effects	Hip-hop	Strange Music	
May 4	Metz	II	Noise rock	Sub Pop	
May 4	Mumford & Sons	Wilder Mind	Alternative rock, indie rock, post-punk	Gentlemen of the Road, Island	
May 4	My Morning Jacket	The Waterfall	Indie rock, psychedelic rock	ATO	
May 4	Nosaj Thing	Fated	Electronic, hip-hop	Innovative Leisure, Timetable Records	
May 5	Chris Stapleton	Traveller	Country	Mercury Nashville	
May 5	Fireflight	Innova	Christian alternative rock, electropop, indie rock		
May 5	Kamasi Washington	The Epic	Jazz	Brainfeeder	
May 5	Kamelot	Haven	Power metal, progressive metal, symphonic metal	Napalm, Universal, Warner Music	
May 5	Korpiklaani	Noita	Folk metal	Nuclear Blast	
May 5	Rose Windows	Rose Windows		Sub Pop	
May 8	Róisín Murphy	Hairless Toys	Electronic, deep house	PIAS	
May 9	Per Mathisen Trio	Ospitalita Generosa		Alessa	
May 11	The Fall	Sub-Lingual Tablet	Post-punk	Cherry Red	
May 12	BoA	Kiss My Lips	K-pop, ballad, dance	SM, KT Music	
May 12	The Early November	Imbue	Alternative rock, pop-punk, emo	Rise	
May 12	Emmylou Harris and Rodney Crowell	The Traveling Kind	Country, folk	Nonesuch	
May 12	Hinder	When the Smoke Clears	Hard rock, post-grunge	The End	
May 12	King Gizzard & the Lizard Wizard	Quarters!	Psychedelic pop, psychedelic rock, jazz-rock	Heavenly, Flightless	
May 12	Patrick Watson	Love Songs for Robots		Domino, Secret City	
May 12	Prefuse 73	Rivington Não Rio		Temporary Residence Limited	
May 12	Prurient	Frozen Niagara Falls	Noise, industrial, power electronics	Profound Lore	
May 12	Snoop Dogg	Bush	West Coast hip-hop	i Am Other, Columbia	
May 12	Sóley	Ask the Deep	Dream pop, indie rock	Morr Music	
May 12	Steve Aoki	Neon Future II	EDM	Ultra Music, Dim Mak	
May 12	The Tallest Man on Earth	Dark Bird Is Home	Folk	Dead Oceans	
May 12	Veil of Maya	Matriarch	Metalcore	Sumerian	
May 13	Envy	Atheist's Cornea	Post-hardcore, screamo, post-rock	Temporary Residence Limited, Sonzai Records, Rock Action	
May 15	Ana & Milton Popović	Blue Room	Blues, soul	ArtisteXclusive records	
May 15	Brandon Flowers	The Desired Effect	Pop, electropop	Island	
May 15	Conchita Wurst	Conchita	Pop, baroque pop	Sony Music	
May 15	Hermitude	Dark Night Sweet Light	Electronica, Australian hip-hop	Elefant Traks	
May 15	Jamie Foxx	Hollywood: A Story of a Dozen Roses	R&B	RCA	
May 15	Zedd	True Colors	Progressive house, complextro, electro house	Interscope	
May 17	Twenty One Pilots	Blurryface	Alternative hip-hop, electropop, hip-hop	Fueled by Ramen	
May 18	Chunk! No, Captain Chunk!	Get Lost, Find Yourself	Pop-punk	Fearless	
May 18	Haste the Day	Coward	Metalcore, Christian metal, hard rock	Solid State	
May 18	Hot Chip	Why Make Sense?	Synth-pop	Domino	
May 18	Mariah Carey	#1 to Infinity	R&B, pop, gospel	Epic, Columbia, Legacy	
May 18	Murs	Have a Nice Life	Hip-hop	Strange	
May 18	Thee Oh Sees	Mutilator Defeated at Last	Garage rock, psychedelic rock	Castle Face	
May 18	Paul Weller	Saturns Pattern	Alternative rock, hard rock, neo-psychedelia	Parlophone, Warner	
May 18	Sister Sparrow & the Dirty Birds	The Weather Below	Rock, Alternative rock	Party Fowl Records, Thirty Tigers	
May 19	Ceremony	The L-Shaped Man	Post-punk	Matador	
May 19	Coal Chamber	Rivals	Nu metal, groove metal	Napalm	
May 19	Faith No More	Sol Invictus	Alternative rock	Reclamation! Records, Ipecac	
May 19	Holly Herndon	Platform	Electronic, experimental pop	4AD	
May 19	Shamir	Ratchet	R&B, disco	XL	
May 19	Silverstein	I Am Alive in Everything I Touch	Post-hardcore	Rise	
May 19	The Story So Far	The Story So Far	Pop-punk	Pure Noise	
May 22	Alesso	Forever	Progressive house, electro house	Def Jam	
May 22	Colleen Hewett	Black & White		Bilarm Music Pty Ltd	
May 22	Daniel Johns	Talk	Neo soul	Eleven	
May 25	Ash	Kablammo!	Alternative rock	earMUSIC	
May 25	Modestep	London Road	Alternative rock, drum and bass, dubstep	INgrooves	
May 25	Nocturnal Sunshine	Nocturnal Sunshine			
May 25	Peatbog Faeries	Blackhouse	Celtic fusion, experimental	Peatbog Records	
May 25	The Vaccines	English Graffiti	Indie rock, pop rock	Columbia	
May 25	Will Young	85% Proof		Island	
May 26	A$AP Rocky	At. Long. Last. A$AP	Hip-hop	RCA	
May 26	The Bad Plus and Joshua Redman	The Bad Plus Joshua Redman	Jazz	Nonesuch	
May 26	Cory Marks	This Man	Country, country rock	Big Star Recordings	
May 26	Kara	In Love	Dance-pop	DSP	
May 26	Lifehouse	Out of the Wasteland	Alternative rock, pop rock, power pop	Ironworks	
May 26	Terence Blanchard	Breathless	Jazz	Blue Note	
May 26	Unknown Mortal Orchestra	Multi-Love	Indie rock, indie pop, psychedelic rock	Jagjaguwar	
May 27	The Darkness	Last of Our Kind	Hard rock	Canary Dwarf	
May 28	CLC	Question	K-pop, dance-pop	Cube	
May 28	Donnie Trumpet & The Social Experiment	Surf	Hip-hop, neo soul, R&B		
May 29	Florence + The Machine	How Big, How Blue, How Beautiful	Indie pop, art rock, alternative pop	Island	
May 29	Heather Nova	The Way It Feels	Alternative rock, indie rock	Embassy of Music	
May 29	Helloween	My God-Given Right	Power metal	Nuclear Blast	
May 29	Jamie xx	In Colour	Electronica, house	Young Turks	
May 29	Jason Derulo	Everything Is 4	R&B, dance, pop	Beluga Heights, Atlantic	
May 29	Paulini	Come Alive	Pop	Fortitude Group, Ambition, Decca	
May 29	Seventeen	17 Carat	Dance-pop	Pledis	
May 29	Soak	Before We Forgot How to Dream	Indie folk, dream pop	Rough Trade	

=== June ===
List of albums released in June 2015
Go to: January | February | March | April | May | June | July | August | September | October | November | December | Back to top
Release date	Artist	Album	Genre	Label	Ref.
June 1	Jaga Jazzist	Starfire	Post-rock, progressive rock, future jazz	Ninja Tune	
June 1	Major Lazer	Peace Is the Mission	EDM, dancehall	Mad Decent	
June 1	Paradise Lost	The Plague Within	Death-doom, gothic metal	Century Media	
June 1	Slaves	Are You Satisfied?	Punk rock	Virgin EMI	
June 2	Billy Currington	Summer Forever	Country	Mercury Nashville	
June 2	Four Year Strong	Four Year Strong	Pop-punk	Pure Noise	
June 2	I the Mighty	Connector	Progressive rock, post-hardcore, alternative rock	Equal Vision	
June 2	Jedi Mind Tricks	The Thief and the Fallen	Conscious hip-hop, underground hip-hop	Enemy Soil	
June 2	Sun Kil Moon	Universal Themes	Folk rock, indie folk, indie rock	Caldo Verde	
June 2	Tenement	Predatory Headlights	Punk rock, pop, pop-punk	Don Giovanni	
June 2	Willie Nelson and Merle Haggard	Django and Jimmie	Country, outlaw country	Legacy	
June 2	Zella Day	Kicker	Indie pop, pop	Pinetop, Hollywood	
June 3	House of Lords	Indestructible		Frontiers	
June 3	Måns Zelmerlöw	Perfectly Damaged	Pop	Warner Music Sweden	
June 4	Tremonti	Cauterize	Thrash metal, post-grunge	FRET12	
June 5	Muse	Drones	Alternative rock, hard rock, progressive rock	Warner Bros., Helium-3	
June 6	Pseudo Echo	Live at the Viper Room	Synth-pop, electronic	Brian Canham	
June 8	FFS	FFS	Indie rock, art rock, dance-rock	Domino	
June 8	Galantis	Pharmacy	Electro house, dance-pop, progressive house	Big Beat, Atlantic	
June 8	Leftfield	Alternative Light Source	EDM, trip hop, tech house	Infectious	
June 8	Of Monsters and Men	Beneath the Skin	Indie pop, indie folk	Republic	
June 8	Young Guns	Ones and Zeros	Alternative rock	Virgin EMI	
June 9	honeyhoney	3	Americana, indie rock, country	Rounder	
June 9	Montgomery Gentry	Folks Like Us	Country	Blaster Records	
June 9	Tamia	Love Life	R&B, pop	Def Jam	
June 10	High Tension	Bully		High Tension, Cooking Vinyl Australia	
June 12	Adam Lambert	The Original High	Synth-pop	Warner Bros.	
June 12	Burning Point	Burning Point		AFM	
June 12	Giorgio Moroder	Déjà Vu	Disco, pop, EDM	RCA	
June 12	Hilary Duff	Breathe In. Breathe Out.	Folk-pop, dance-pop	RCA	
June 12	Savage Garden	The Singles	Pop	JWM, Universal	
June 15	James Taylor	Before This World	Soft rock, folk	Concord	
June 15	Mika	No Place in Heaven	Pop	Casablanca	
June 15	Sarah Cracknell	Red Kite	Pop, baroque pop	Cherry Red	
June 16	Active Child	Mercy		Vagrant	
June 16	Czarface	Every Hero Needs a Villain	Hip-hop	Brick Records	
June 16	Fucked Up	Year of the Hare		Deathwish	
June 16	Hudson Mohawke	Lantern	Electronic	Warp	
June 16	Lukas Graham	Lukas Graham	Pop	Copenhagen, Warner Bros.	
June 16	MewithoutYou	Pale Horses	Indie rock, art rock	Run for Cover, Big Scary Monsters, Cooking Vinyl	
June 16	Nate Ruess	Grand Romantic	Pop	Fueled by Ramen	
June 16	Our Last Night	Younger Dreams			
June 16	Robert Glasper Trio	Covered	Jazz	Blue Note	
June 16	Ryn Weaver	The Fool	Indie pop	Interscope, Mad Love	
June 16	Third Eye Blind	Dopamine	Alternative rock, power pop, pop rock	Mega Collider	
June 17	Alexandros	ALXD	Alternative rock, J-pop, pop-punk	Universal Japan, RX-Records	
June 19	Borealis	Purgatory	Power metal, progressive metal	AFM	
June 19	Christine Anu	ReStylin' Up 20 Years	Jazz, soul, pop	Social Family	
June 19	Demet Akalın	Pırlanta	Pop	Doğan Music Company	
June 19	Graveworm	Ascending Hate		Nuclear Blast	
June 21	Four Tet	Morning/Evening		Text	
June 22	AOA	Heart Attack	K-pop, electropop, dance-pop	FNC Entertainment	
June 22	The Ethical Debating Society	New Sense		Odd Box	
June 22	Everything Everything	Get to Heaven	Art pop, art rock, progressive pop	RCA	
June 22	The Orb	Moonbuilding 2703 AD	Ambient house, dub, IDM	Kompakt	
June 22	Thundercat	The Beyond / Where the Giants Roam	Jazz-funk	Brainfeeder	
June 22	Wolf Alice	My Love Is Cool	Alternative rock	Dirty Hit	
June 23	Breaking Benjamin	Dark Before Dawn	Hard rock, alternative metal, post-grunge	Hollywood	
June 23	Cayucas	Dancing at the Blue Lagoon	Rock	Secretly Canadian	
June 23	Dave Douglas	High Risk	Jazz	Greenleaf Music	
June 23	Desaparecidos	Payola	Punk rock, post-hardcore	Epitaph	
June 23	Elijah Blake	Shadows & Diamonds		ARTium, Def Jam	
June 23	High on Fire	Luminiferous	Stoner metal, sludge metal, thrash metal	eOne	
June 23	Kacey Musgraves	Pageant Material	Neotraditional country	Mercury Nashville	
June 23	Leon Bridges	Coming Home	R&B, soul	Columbia	
June 23	Lindemann	Skills in Pills	Industrial metal	Warner Music	
June 23	Richard Thompson	Still	English folk, folk rock	Fantasy, Proper	
June 23	Son Lux	Bones	Post-rock	Glassnote	
June 23	Tori Kelly	Unbreakable Smile	Pop, R&B	Capitol, Schoolboy	
June 23	Tyga	The Gold Album: 18th Dynasty	Hip-hop	Last Kings	
June 24	Carly Rae Jepsen	Emotion	Pop, dance-pop	604, School Boy, Interscope	
June 26	Thy Art Is Murder	Holy War	Deathcore	UNFD, Nuclear Blast	
June 26	Unleash the Archers	Time Stands Still	Power metal, speed metal, melodic death metal	Napalm	
June 28	Wavves and Cloud Nothings	No Life for Me	Post-punk, pop-punk, indie rock	Ghost Ramp	
June 29	August Burns Red	Found in Far Away Places	Metalcore, progressive metal	Fearless	
June 29	Meek Mill	Dreams Worth More Than Money	Hip-hop	Maybach, Atlantic	
June 29	Miguel	Wildheart	R&B, rock	ByStorm, RCA	
June 29	Neil Young	The Monsanto Years	Rock	Reprise	
June 30	Bilal	In Another Life	Neo soul	eOne Music	
June 30	Bonnie McKee	Bombastic	Pop	Bonnie McKee Music	
June 30	Failure	The Heart Is a Monster	Alternative rock	INgrooves Music Group	
June 30	Main Attrakionz	808s & Dark Grapes III	Hip-hop	Vapor Records	
June 30	Man Overboard	Heavy Love	Pop-punk	Rise	
June 30	Mutoid Man	Bleeder	Hard rock, progressive metal	Sargent House	
June 30	Senses Fail	Pull the Thorns from Your Heart	Metalcore	Pure Noise	
June 30	Vince Staples	Summertime '06	Hip-hop	ARTium, Def Jam	

== Third quarter ==
=== July ===
List of albums released in July 2015
Go to: January | February | March | April | May | June | July | August | September | October | November | December | Back to top
Release date	Artist	Album	Genre	Label	Ref.
July 1	Big Bang	D	Electronic rock, pop-punk, pop	YG Entertainment	
July 3	The V	Now or Never			
July 4	Lil Wayne	Free Weezy Album	Hip-hop	Young Money	
July 7	Statik Selektah	Lucky 7	Hip-hop	Showoff Records, Duck Down Music	
July 8	Uniform	Perfect World	Noise rock, industrial rock	12XU, Alter Records	
July 10	Between the Buried and Me	Coma Ecliptic	Progressive metal	Metal Blade	
July 10	Cody Simpson	Free	Rock, folk	Coast House Records, Banana Beat Records	
July 10	Cradle of Filth	Hammer of the Witches	Extreme metal	Nuclear Blast	
July 10	Ghostface Killah	Twelve Reasons to Die II	Hip-hop	Linear Labs	
July 10	Little Boots	Working Girl	Synth-pop, disco	On Repeat, Dim Mak	
July 10	Owl City	Mobile Orchestra	Electropop, synth-pop, EDM	Republic	
July 10	Phinehas	Till the End	Metalcore	Artery	
July 10	Quelle Chris and Chris Keys	Innocent Country	Hip-hop	Mello Music	
July 10	R5	Sometime Last Night	Pop rock	Hollywood	
July 10	Samantha Fish	Wild Heart		Ruf	
July 10	Tyrese	Black Rose	R&B	Voltron, Caroline	
July 10	Veruca Salt	Ghost Notes	Alternative rock	El Camino Records	
July 10	Years & Years	Communion	Synth-pop, dance-pop	Polydor	
July 16	Public Enemy	Man Plans God Laughs	Hip-hop	Spitdigital	
July 16	Wilco	Star Wars	Alternative rock, indie rock	dBpm	
July 17	The Chemical Brothers	Born in the Echoes	Electronica, trip hop, house	Astralwerks, Virgin EMI	
July 17	Future	DS2	Hip-hop, trap	Freebandz, Epic, A1	
July 17	Galactic	Into the Deep	Jazz-funk	Provogue	
July 17	Iron & Wine & Ben Bridwell	Sing into My Mouth	World	Black Cricket, Brown	
July 17	Jason Isbell	Something More Than Free	Alternative country	Southeastern Records	
July 17	MS MR	How Does It Feel	Indie pop, alternative rock	Columbia	
July 17	Pitbull	Dale	Latin	Mr. 305, RCA	
July 17	Ratatat	Magnifique	Alternative rock	Because Music	
July 17	Tame Impala	Currents	Psychedelic pop	Modular, Interscope	
July 17	White Reaper	White Reaper Does It Again	Punk rock, garage rock, indie rock	Polyvinyl	
July 23	Prince Royce	Double Vision	Pop	RCA	
July 24	Ashley Monroe	The Blade	Neotraditional country	Warner Bros. Nashville	
July 24	Bea Miller	Not an Apology	Pop-punk	Hollywood	
July 24	The Bunny the Bear	A Liar Wrote This	Post-hardcore, experimental rock, alternative rock	Victory	
July 24	Holy Holy	When the Storms Would Come		Wonderlick	
July 24	Hopsin	Pound Syndrome	Hip-hop	Funk Volume	
July 24	Jill Scott	Woman	Neo soul, funk	Blue Babe, Atlantic	
July 24	Joe Satriani	Shockwave Supernova	Instrumental rock	Sony Music	
July 24	Lamb of God	VII: Sturm und Drang	Groove metal, thrash metal	Epic, Nuclear Blast	
July 24	L'Orange and Kool Keith	Time? Astonishing!	Hip-hop	Mello Music	
July 24	Nervo	Collateral	Dance, EDM	Ultra Music	
July 24	Sleaford Mods	Key Markets		Harbinger Sound	
July 24	Symphony X	Underworld	Progressive metal, neoclassical metal	Nuclear Blast	
July 24	Watkins Family Hour	Watkins Family Hour		Family Hour Records, Thirty Tigers	
July 24	We Came as Romans	We Came as Romans	Alternative metal, nu metal	Equal Vision, Spinefarm, Caroline Australia	
July 28	Omar Souleyman	Bahdeni Nami		Monkeytown	
July 28	Titus Andronicus	The Most Lamentable Tragedy	Punk rock, indie rock	Merge	
July 30	Krallice	Ygg huur	Black metal, technical death metal, avant-garde metal	Hathenter, Gilead Media, Avantgarde Music	
July 31	Buddy Guy	Born to Play Guitar	Blues	RCA	
July 31	CFCF	Radiance and Submission		Driftless Recordings	
July 31	Finger Eleven	Five Crooked Lines	Alternative rock, hard rock	The Bicycle Music Company	
July 31	Insane Clown Posse	The Marvelous Missing Link: Found	Pop rap, progressive pop, funk	Psychopathic	
July 31	Joss Stone	Water for Your Soul	Soul, reggae, world	S-Curve, Stone'd	
July 31	Kataklysm	Of Ghosts and Gods	Death metal, melodic death metal	Nuclear Blast	
July 31	Knuckle Puck	Copacetic	Pop-punk	Rise	
July 31	Lianne La Havas	Blood	Neo soul	Warner Bros.	
July 31	The Maccabees	Marks to Prove It	Art rock, indie rock	Fiction, Communion	
July 31	Migos	Yung Rich Nation	Trap	300, Quality Control	
July 31	Natalie Imbruglia	Male		Portrait	
July 31	Saint Asonia	Saint Asonia	Post-grunge, hard rock	RCA	
July 31	Teenage Time Killers	Teenage Time Killers: Greatest Hits Vol. 1		Rise	
July 31	Xandria	Fire & Ashes	Symphonic metal, power metal	Napalm	

=== August ===
List of albums released in August 2015
Go to: January | February | March | April | May | June | July | August | September | October | November | December | Back to top
Release date	Artist	Album	Genre	Label	Ref.
August 3	On Bodies	Unremarkably Mortal	Hardcore	Irish VooDoo Records	
August 5	Big Bang	E	Hip-hop	YG	
August 5	Lil B and Chance the Rapper	Free	Hip-hop		
August 7	Cattle Decapitation	The Anthropocene Extinction	Technical death metal, deathgrind	Metal Blade	
August 7	Chelsea Wolfe	Abyss	Doom metal, noise rock	Sargent House	
August 7	Dr. Dre	Compton	West Coast hip-hop	Aftermath, Interscope	
August 7	Fear Factory	Genexus	Industrial metal, groove metal, thrash metal	Nuclear Blast	
August 7	Frank Turner	Positive Songs for Negative People	Folk punk, folk rock	Xtra Mile	
August 7	Gangrene	You Disgust Me	Hip-hop	Mass Appeal	
August 7	Health	Death Magic		Loma Vista	
August 7	Ivy Levan	No Good	Pop, smooth soul	Interscope, Cherrytree	
August 7	Langhorne Slim	The Spirit Moves		Dualtone	
August 7	Luke Bryan	Kill the Lights	Country	Capitol Nashville	
August 7	La Luz	Weirdo Shrine		Hardly Art	
August 7	Mac DeMarco	Another One	Indie rock	Captured Tracks	
August 7	Miss May I	Deathless	Metalcore	Rise	
August 7	Obie Trice	The Hangover	Hip-hop	Black Market Entertainment	
August 7	Robyn & La Bagatelle Magique	Love Is Free	Dance	Konichiwa, Cherrytree, Interscope	
August 7	The Rubens	Hoops	Alternative rock, pop, rock	Ivy League	
August 7	Worriers	Imaginary Life	Indie rock, punk rock	Don Giovanni	
August 13	FKA Twigs	M3LL155X		Young Turks	
August 14	Atticus Ross	Music from Love and Mercy	Ambient, mashup	Capitol	
August 14	B.o.B.	Psycadelik Thoughtz	Hip-hop	Grand Hustle, Atlantic, Rebel Rock	
August 14	Bullet for My Valentine	Venom	Metalcore, thrash metal	RCA	
August 14	CFCF	The Colours of Life	New-age, electronic, ambient	1080p	
August 14	The Good Life	Everybody's Coming Down	Indie rock	Saddle Creek	
August 14	Grace Potter	Midnight	Pop, dance-pop	Hollywood	
August 14	Julieta Venegas	Algo Sucede	Folk rock, indie pop, pop rock	Ohanian S., Sony Music Latin	
August 14	Melanie Martinez	Cry Baby	Electropop	Atlantic	
August 14	Neck Deep	Life's Not out to Get You	Pop-punk	Hopeless	
August 14	New Politics	Vikings	Alternative rock	Warner Bros., DCD2	
August 14	Palehound	Dry Food		Exploding in Sound	
August 14	Soulfly	Archangel	Thrash metal, groove metal	Nuclear Blast	
August 16	Irène Schweizer and Han Bennink	Welcome Back	Free improvisation	Intakt	
August 21	AFX	Orphaned Deejay Selek 2006–08		Warp	
August 21	Bon Jovi	Burning Bridges		Mercury	
August 21	Butcher Babies	Take It Like a Man	Thrash metal	Century Media	
August 21	David Campbell	The Essential David Campbell	Pop	Sony Music Australia	
August 21	The Devil Wears Prada	Space	Metalcore, space rock	Rise	
August 21	Disturbed	Immortalized	Heavy metal, alternative metal	Reprise	
August 21	The Fratellis	Eyes Wide, Tongue Tied	Alternative rock	Cooking Vinyl	
August 21	Ghost	Meliora	Heavy metal, doom metal, progressive rock	Loma Vista	
August 21	Imperial State Electric	Honk Machine		Psychout	
August 21	Jess Glynne	I Cry When I Laugh	Pop, R&B	Atlantic	
August 21	JoJo	III.	Electro, R&B	Atlantic	
August 21	Jordin Sparks	Right Here Right Now	R&B, pop	19, Louder Than Life, RAL	
August 21	Kip Moore	Wild Ones	Country pop, country rock, heartland rock	MCA Nashville	
August 21	Method Man	The Meth Lab	Hip-hop	Hanz On Music, Tommy Boy	
August 21	Nathaniel Rateliff & the Night Sweats	Nathaniel Rateliff & the Night Sweats	Rock, soul	Stax, Concord	
August 21	P.O.D.	The Awakening	Alternative metal, Christian metal, nu metal	Universal, T-Boy	
August 21	Pop Evil	Up	Hard rock, rock	eOne Music	
August 21	Royal Headache	High	Punk rock	What's Your Rupture?	
August 21	Spector	Moth Boys	Indie rock	Fiction	
August 21	The Sword	High Country	Stoner rock, hard rock	Razor & Tie	
August 26	The Gazette	Dogma	Rock	Sony Music Japan	
August 28	Andra Day	Cheers to the Fall	R&B	Warner Bros.	
August 28	Atlas Genius	Inanimate Objects	Alternative rock, indietronica, synth-pop	Warner Bros.	
August 28	Beach House	Depression Cherry	Dream pop	Sub Pop	
August 28	Crazy Town	The Brimstone Sluggers	Rap rock	Membran Records	
August 28	Destroyer	Poison Season		Merge, Dead Oceans	
August 28	Ella Eyre	Feline		Virgin EMI	
August 28	Foals	What Went Down	Indie rock	Transgressive	
August 28	Halsey	Badlands	Electropop, synth-pop	Astralwerks, Capitol	
August 28	Holly Golightly	Slowtown Now!		Damaged Goods	
August 28	Hooton Tennis Club	Highest Point in Cliff Town			
August 28	Die Krupps	V – Metal Machine Music	Industrial metal, groove metal, EBM	Oblivion	
August 28	Last Dinosaurs	Wellness	Indie rock, synth-pop	Dew Process, Universal Music Australia	
August 28	Motörhead	Bad Magic	Heavy metal, hard rock	UDR GmbH	
August 28	Natural Information Society and Bitchin Bajas	Automaginary	Free jazz, minimalism, post-rock	Drag City	
August 28	The Paper Kites	Twelvefour	Indie rock, folk rock	Wonderlick, Sony Music Australia, Nettwerk	
August 28	Soilwork	The Ride Majestic	Melodic death metal	Nuclear Blast	
August 28	Titãs	Nheengatu ao Vivo	Punk rock, rock	Som Livre	
August 28	The Weeknd	Beauty Behind the Madness	Alternative R&B, R&B, pop	Republic, XO	
August 28	Yo La Tengo	Stuff Like That There	Indie rock	Matador	
August 30	Miley Cyrus	Miley Cyrus & Her Dead Petz	Experimental, psychedelic	Smiley Miley	

=== September ===
List of albums released in September 2015
Go to: January | February | March | April | May | June | July | August | September | October | November | December | Back to top
Release date	Artist	Album	Genre	Label	Ref.
September 4	a-ha	Cast in Steel	Alternative rock, pop rock	Universal	
September 4	Against Me!	23 Live Sex Acts	Punk rock	Total Treble Music	
September 4	Amorphis	Under the Red Cloud	Progressive metal, melodic death metal	Nuclear Blast	
September 4	Ane Brun	When I'm Free	Folk	Balloon Ranger Recordings	
September 4	The Arcs	Yours, Dreamily,	Garage rock, soul, rhythm and blues	Nonesuch	
September 4	Cécile McLorin Salvant	For One to Love	Jazz	Mack Avenue	
September 4	The Dear Hunter	Act IV: Rebirth in Reprise	Progressive rock, indie rock	Equal Vision	
September 4	Fidlar	Too		Mom + Pop, Wichita, Dine Alone	
September 4	Five Finger Death Punch	Got Your Six	Groove metal, alternative metal, hard rock	Prospect Park	
September 4	Iron Maiden	The Book of Souls	Heavy metal	Parlophone	
September 4	k-os	Can't Fly Without Gravity	Alternative hip-hop	Dine Alone	
September 4	Lou Barlow	Brace the Wave	Folk rock, lo-fi, alternative rock	Joyful Noise, Domino	
September 4	Oh Wonder	Oh Wonder	Indie pop, electropop, Alternative rock	Island, Republic, Caroline	
September 4	Public Image Ltd	What the World Needs Now...	Post-punk	PiL Official Ltd	
September 4	Riverside	Love, Fear and the Time Machine	Progressive rock	Inside Out	
September 4	Scarface	Deeply Rooted	Hip-hop	Facemob Music, BMG	
September 4	Tigran Hamasyan	Luys i Luso	Armenian sacred music, Armenian folk	ECM	
September 4	Travis Scott	Rodeo	Hip-hop	Grand Hustle, Epic	
September 4	Troye Sivan	Wild	Electropop, dream pop	EMI Music Australia, Capitol	
September 4	Wisin	Los Vaqueros: La Trilogía		Sony Music Latin	
September 4	The Wonder Years	No Closer to Heaven	Pop-punk	Hopeless	
September 7	Prince	Hit n Run Phase One	R&B, soul, electronic	NPG	
September 11	Beirut	No No No	Indie folk, Balkan folk	4AD	
September 11	Ben Folds	So There	Chamber pop	New West	
September 11	Brett Eldredge	Illinois	Country	Atlantic Nashville	
September 11	Bring Me the Horizon	That's the Spirit	Alternative rock, electronic rock, pop rock	Sony Music, Columbia, RCA	
September 11	Colton Dixon	The Calm Before the Storm	CCM	Sparrow, Capitol CMG	
September 11	Duran Duran	Paper Gods	New wave, pop rock, pop	Warner Bros.	
September 11	Hollywood Vampires	Hollywood Vampires	Rock	Republic, Universal Music	
September 11	Jarryd James	Thirty One	Indie pop	Dryden Street, Universal Australia	
September 11	Jay Rock	90059	West Coast hip-hop	Top Dawg	
September 11	Jewel	Picking Up the Pieces	Country folk	Sugar Hill	
September 11	John Pizzarelli	Midnight McCartney	Jazz, vocal jazz	Concord	
September 11	Kwabs	Love + War	Pop, R&B, soul	Atlantic	
September 11	Kylie and Garibay	Kylie and Garibay	Electronic	Parlophone, Warner Bros.	
September 11	Leona Lewis	I Am	R&B	Island, Def Jam	
September 11	The Libertines	Anthems for Doomed Youth	Garage rock revival, indie rock	Virgin EMI	
September 11	Low	Ones and Sixes		Sub Pop	
September 11	Nero	Between II Worlds	Electronic rock, dubstep, drum and bass	MTA	
September 11	Richard Hawley	Hollow Meadows	Chamber pop	Parlophone, Warner Bros.	
September 11	Slayer	Repentless	Thrash metal	Nuclear Blast	
September 11	Stereophonics	Keep the Village Alive	Rock	Stylus Records	
September 11	Stratovarius	Eternal		Edel	
September 11	T.I.	Da' Nic	Hip-hop	King Inc., Grand Hustle, Empire	
September 15	Toby Fox	Undertale Soundtrack	Chiptune, ambient, electronicore	Materia Collective	
September 16	Tofubeats	Positive	J-pop	Unborde	
September 18	Ann Wilson	The Ann Wilson Thing! - #1			
September 18	Atreyu	Long Live	Metalcore	Spinefarm	
September 18	Battles	La Di Da Di	Experimental rock, math rock, instrumental rock	Warp	
September 18	The Black Dahlia Murder	Abysmal	Melodic death metal	Metal Blade	
September 18	Blackalicious	Imani Vol. 1	Hip-hop	OGM Recordings	
September 18	blessthefall	To Those Left Behind	Metalcore	Fearless	
September 18	Le Butcherettes	A Raw Youth	Punk rock, indie rock	Rodriguez Lopez Productions, Ipecac	
September 18	Chris Cornell	Higher Truth	Rock	Universal	
September 18	Christian McBride	Live at the Village Vanguard	Jazz	Mack Avenue	
September 18	CocoRosie	Heartache City	Freak folk	Lost Girl Records	
September 18	Creeper	The Callous Heart	Horror punk, punk rock	Roadrunner	
September 18	David Cook	Digital Vein	Rock	Analog Heart	
September 18	David Gilmour	Rattle That Lock	Rock	Columbia	
September 18	The Front Bottoms	Back on Top	Indie rock	Fueled by Ramen	
September 18	Glen Hansard	Didn't He Ramble		Anti-, Epitaph	
September 18	Home Free	Country Evolution	A cappella, country	Columbia	
September 18	Jon Stevens	Woman	Rock	Social Family	
September 18	Judy Collins	Strangers Again			
September 18	Katharine McPhee	Hysteria	Pop	eOne	
September 18	Keith Richards	Crosseyed Heart	Rock, Rock and roll, blues	Republic	
September 18	Leigh Nash	The State I'm In	Country		
September 18	Lana Del Rey	Honeymoon	Baroque pop, dream pop, trip hop	Polydor, Interscope	
September 18	Little Simz	A Curious Tale of Trials + Persons	Hip-hop	Age 101 Music	
September 18	Mac Miller	GO:OD AM	Hip-hop	Warner Bros., REMember	
September 18	Meg Myers	Sorry	Pop rock, electronic rock, synth-pop	Atlantic	
September 18	Mercury Rev	The Light in You	Alternative rock, neo-psychedelia	Bella Union	
September 18	Metric	Pagans in Vegas	Indie rock, new wave	Metric Music International	
September 18	Mild High Club	Timeline	Psychedelic pop	Circle Star Records	
September 18	Motion City Soundtrack	Panic Stations	Pop-punk, alternative rock, indie rock	Epitaph	
September 18	Ought	Sun Coming Down	Indie rock	Constellation	
September 18	Pwr Bttm	Ugly Cherries	Queercore		
September 18	Reflections	The Color Clear	Progressive metalcore	eOne, Good Fight	
September 18	Rhodes	Wishes		Imports Records	
September 18	Robert DeLong	In the Cards		Glassnote	
September 18	Shinedown	Threat to Survival	Hard rock	Atlantic	
September 18	Toadies	Heretics	Alternative rock	Kirtland	
September 18	Turnpike Troubadours	The Turnpike Troubadours		Bossier City Records	
September 18	Ugly Kid Joe	Uglier Than They Used ta Be	Rock, hard rock, heavy metal	Metalville, UKJ Records	
September 18	Windhand	Grief's Infernal Flower	Doom metal	Relapse	
September 20	Drake & Future	What a Time to Be Alive	Hip-hop	Cash Money, Epic, Freebandz	
September 21	Ryan Adams	1989	Alternative country, rock	PAX AM	
September 25	Big Grams (Big Boi and Phantogram)	Big Grams	Alternative hip-hop	Epic	
September 25	Caspian	Dust and Disquiet		Triple Crown	
September 25	Chvrches	Every Open Eye	Synth-pop	Virgin EMI	
September 25	Darkstar	Foam Island		Warp	
September 25	The Dead Weather	Dodge and Burn	Alternative rock, garage rock, hard rock	Third Man	
September 25	Anthony de Mare	Liaisons: Re-Imagining Sondheim from the Piano	Classical	ECM	
September 25	Disclosure	Caracal	House, UK garage	PMR, Island	
September 25	Don Henley	Cass County	Country	Past Masters Holdings, Capitol	
September 25	Fetty Wap	Fetty Wap	Hip-hop, trap	RGF Productions, 300, Atlantic	
September 25	Gloryhammer	Space 1992: Rise of the Chaos Wizards	Symphonic power metal	Napalm	
September 25	Graveyard	Innocence & Decadence	Hard rock, psychedelic rock, folk rock	Nuclear Blast	
September 25	Julia Holter	Have You in My Wilderness	Baroque pop, dream pop	Domino	
September 25	Kaskade	Automatic	Dance, progressive house, deep house	Arkade, Warner Bros.	
September 25	Kurt Vile	B'lieve I'm Goin Down...	Indie rock	Matador	
September 25	Los Lobos	Gates of Gold		429, Proper	
September 25	Matthew Good	Chaotic Neutral	Alternative rock	Warner Music Canada	
September 25	Milo	So the Flies Don't Come	Hip-hop	Ruby Yacht, The Order Label	
September 25	New Order	Music Complete	Dance-rock, electropop	Mute	
September 25	No Devotion	Permanence	Synth-pop, new wave	Collect	
September 25	Parkway Drive	Ire	Metalcore	Epitaph	
September 25	Peaches	Rub	Electropop	I U She	
September 25	Robin Schulz	Sugar	Deep house	TONSPIEL, Warner	
September 25	Run the Jewels	Meow the Jewels		Mass Appeal, RBC	
September 25	Silversun Pickups	Better Nature	Alternative rock, shoegaze	New Machine Records	
September 25	Sons of Kemet	Lest We Forget What We Came Here to Do	Avant-garde jazz	Naim	
September 25	Thomas Rhett	Tangled Up	Country	Valory	
September 25	U.S. Girls	Half Free	Art pop, electronic, experimental pop	4AD	
September 25	V V Brown	Glitch	Electronica, trip hop	YOY Records	
September 25	Il Volo	L'amore si muove	Pop, operatic pop	Sony Music	
September 25	Wand	1000 Days	Psychedelic rock	Drag City	
September 25	The World Is a Beautiful Place & I Am No Longer Afraid to Die	Harmlessness	Indie rock, emo, post-rock	Epitaph	
September 25	Youth Lagoon	Savage Hills Ballroom	Dream pop	Fat Possum	
September 30	Seth MacFarlane	No One Ever Tells You	Easy listening, traditional pop, vocal jazz	Republic, Fuzzy Door Productions	

== Fourth quarter ==
=== October ===
List of albums released in October 2015
Go to: January | February | March | April | May | June | July | August | September | October | November | December | Back to top
Release date	Artist	Album	Genre	Label	Ref.
October 2	Avicii	Stories	House, electronic dance	PRMD, Island	
October 2	Blitzen Trapper	All Across This Land	Alternative country	Vagrant, Lojinx	
October 2	Bryan Adams	Get Up	Rock	Polydor	
October 2	Bryson Tiller	Trapsoul	Alternative R&B, soul	RCA	
October 2	Children of Bodom	I Worship Chaos	Melodic death metal	Nuclear Blast	
October 2	Clutch	Psychic Warfare	Blues rock, stoner rock	Weathermaker	
October 2	Cold Chisel	The Perfect Crime	Rock	Cold Chisel Music	
October 2	Collective Soul	See What You Started by Continuing	Alternative rock, post-grunge	Vanguard	
October 2	Deafheaven	New Bermuda	Blackgaze, post-metal	Anti-	
October 2	Eagles of Death Metal	Zipper Down	Garage rock	Downtown	
October 2	Editors	In Dream	Post-punk revival, dark wave, synth-pop	PIAS	
October 2	Fit for an Autopsy	Absolute Hope Absolute Hell	Deathcore	eOne Music	
October 2	Janet Jackson	Unbreakable	R&B, pop	Rhythm Nation, BMG	
October 2	Kylesa	Exhausting Fire	Sludge metal, heavy metal	Season of Mist	
October 2	Malevolent Creation	Dead Man's Path	Death metal	Century Media	
October 2	New Years Day	Malevolence	Alternative metal, gothic metal, hard rock	Another Century	
October 2	Night Birds	Mutiny at Muscle Beach		Fat Wreck Chords	
October 2	Queensrÿche	Condition Hüman	Heavy metal, progressive metal	Century Media	
October 2	Rudimental	We the Generation	Drum and bass, soul	Asylum, Atlantic, Black Butter	
October 2	Sevendust	Kill the Flaw	Alternative metal	Asylum, 7Bros.	
October 2	The Sheepdogs	Future Nostalgia	Rock, boogie rock, Southern rock	Warner	
October 2	The Shoes	Chemicals		Green United Music	
October 2	Swim Deep	Mothers	Psychedelic pop	RCA	
October 2	Tamar Braxton	Calling All Lovers	R&B	Epic, Streamline Records	
October 2	Trivium	Silence in the Snow	Heavy metal	Roadrunner	
October 2	Wavves	V		Ghost Ramp, Warner Bros.	
October 2	The Winery Dogs	Hot Streak	Hard rock, blues rock	Three Dog Music	
October 7	Taeyeon	I	Pop rock, R&B	SM	
October 9	Alesha Dixon	Do It for Love	R&B	Precious Stone Records	
October 9	Alex G	Beach Music	Indie rock	Domino	
October 9	Boy & Bear	Limit of Love	Indie rock, indie folk	Universal	
October 9	City and Colour	If I Should Go Before You	Alternative rock	Dine Alone	
October 9	The Decemberists	Florasongs	Indie folk, folk rock	Capitol	
October 9	Faithless	Faithless 2.0	Trip hop, trance, dance	Nates Tunes, PIAS, Ultra	
October 9	The Game	The Documentary 2	West Coast hip-hop	Blood Money, eOne Music	
October 9	The Hoosiers	The Secret Service	Indie pop	Crab Race Ltd.	
October 9	Hurts	Surrender	Synth-pop	Sony Music, Columbia	
October 9	Jamie Lawson	Jamie Lawson	Pop	Gingerbread Man Records	
October 9	John Grant	Grey Tickles, Black Pressure	Soft rock	Bella Union	
October 9	Mayday Parade	Black Lines	Emo, pop-punk	Fearless	
October 9	Nicole Dollanganger	Natural Born Losers	Alternative rock, alt-pop	Eerie Organization	
October 9	Protomartyr	The Agent Intellect	Post-punk, indie rock	Hardly Art	
October 9	R. City	What Dreams Are Made Of	Reggae fusion, hip-hop	Kemosabe	
October 9	Reece Mastin	Change Colours	Pop rock	Social Family	
October 9	Selena Gomez	Revival	Pop	Interscope, Polydor	
October 9	The Spook School	Try to Be Hopeful	Indie pop, indie rock, noise pop	Fortuna Pop!	
October 9	St Germain	St Germain	Nu jazz	Warner Bros.	
October 9	Toby Keith	35 MPH Town	Country	Show Dog-Universal	
October 9	W.A.S.P.	Golgotha	Heavy metal	Napalm	
October 9	The Zombies	Still Got That Hunger	Blues rock	The End	
October 16	!!!	As If	Dance-punk, indie rock, dance	Warp	
October 16	Beach House	Thank Your Lucky Stars	Dream pop	Sub Pop, Bella Union	
October 16	Børns	Dopamine	Indie pop, alternative rock, synth-pop	Interscope	
October 16	Caravan Palace	<I°_°I>	Electro swing	Wagram	
October 16	Coheed and Cambria	The Color Before the Sun	Alternative rock, pop rock	300 Entertainment	
October 16	Deerhunter	Fading Frontier	Dream pop, experimental rock	4AD	
October 16	Demi Lovato	Confident	Pop	Hollywood, Island, Safehouse	
October 16	Dinosaur Pile-Up	Eleven Eleven	Alternative rock, post-grunge	SO Recordings, A-Sketch	
October 16	The Game	The Documentary 2.5	West Coast hip-hop, gangsta rap	Blood Money, eOne Music	
October 16	Jean-Michel Jarre	Electronica 1: The Time Machine	Electronic	Columbia	
October 16	Joe Budden	All Love Lost	Hip-hop	eOne	
October 16	Josh Ritter	Sermon on the Rocks	Folk rock, Americana	Pytheas Recordings	
October 16	Ludovico Einaudi	Elements	Modern classical	Decca	
October 16	Neon Indian	Vega Intl. Night School	Electronic, disco, neo-psychedelia	Mom + Pop, Transgressive	
October 16	Nothing But Thieves	Nothing but Thieves	Alternative rock	RCA	
October 16	Omi	Me 4 U	Tropical house, reggae	Ultra, Columbia	
October 16	Pentatonix	Pentatonix	A cappella	RCA	
October 16	Son Little	Son Little	Soul, blues	Anti-	
October 16	State Champs	Around the World and Back	Pop-punk	Pure Noise	
October 16	The Twilight Sad	Òran Mór Session	Post-punk revival, indie rock	FatCat	
October 20	The Blue Stones	Black Holes	Blues rock, psychedelic rock, space rock	Entertainment One	
October 20	Twice	The Story Begins	K-pop, dance	JYP	
October 22	Kari Rueslåtten	To the North			
October 23	5 Seconds of Summer	Sounds Good Feels Good	Pop rock, pop-punk	Hi or Hey, Capitol	
October 23	Born of Osiris	Soul Sphere	Progressive metalcore	Sumerian	
October 23	Carrie Underwood	Storyteller	Country	Arista Nashville, 19	
October 23	Chris Isaak	First Comes the Night	Roots rock	Vanguard	
October 23	Chris Tomlin	Adore: Christmas Songs of Worship	Worship, CCM	sixstepsrecords, Sparrow	
October 23	Dave Gahan & Soulsavers	Angels & Ghosts	Alternative rock, blues rock, acoustic music	Columbia	
October 23	Fat Freddy's Drop	Bays	Dub, funk, reggae	The Drop	
October 23	Fuzz	II	Heavy metal, hard rock	In the Red	
October 23	Gazpacho	Molok			
October 23	Joanna Newsom	Divers	Avant-garde, baroque pop	Drag City	
October 23	Josef Salvat	Night Swim	Pop, electropop	Columbia	
October 23	Julien Baker	Sprained Ankle	Folk	6131 Records	
October 23	Killing Joke	Pylon	Industrial metal, post-punk	Spinefarm, UMG	
October 23	Like Moths to Flames	The Dying Things We Live For	Metalcore, post-hardcore	Rise	
October 23	Marianas Trench	Astoria	Pop rock	604	
October 23	Mogwai	Central Belters	Post-rock	Rock Action	
October 23	Pure Bathing Culture	Pray for Rain		Partisan	
October 23	Rod Stewart	Another Country		Capitol	
October 23	RuPaul	Slay Belles	Christmas	RuCo Inc.	
October 23	Vanessa Carlton	Liberman	Pop	Dine Alone	
October 27	f(x)	4 Walls	Electropop, house, synth-pop	SM, Genie Music	
October 27	Mark Kozelek and Nicolás Pauls	Dreams of Childhood	Spoken word	Caldo Verde	
October 28	Il Divo	Amor & Pasión	Classical crossover, tango, bolero	Syco, Sony Music, Columbia	
October 30	Amy Winehouse and Antônio Pinto	Amy	Jazz, soul, neo soul	Island	
October 30	Beach Slang	The Things We Do to Find People Who Feel Like Us		Polyvinyl, Big Scary Monsters	
October 30	Car Seat Headrest	Teens of Style	Indie rock	Matador	
October 30	Carnage	Papi Gordo	Big room house, trap	Ultra	
October 30	The Chills	Silver Bullets	Indie pop, indie rock	Fire	
October 30	Def Leppard	Def Leppard	Hard rock	Bludgeon Riffola, earMUSIC, Mailboat	
October 30	Drive-By Truckers	It's Great to Be Alive!		ATO	
October 30	Escape the Fate	Hate Me	Post-hardcore, hard rock, metalcore	Eleven Seven	
October 30	Foxing	Dealer	Emo, indie rock, post-rock	Triple Crown	
October 30	Iglooghost	Chinese Nü Yr	Experimental, electronic, wonky	Brainfeeder	
October 30	James Morrison	Higher Than Here	Pop	Island	
October 30	Jeffrey Lewis and Los Bolts	Manhattan	Anti-folk	Rough Trade	
October 30	Lalah Hathaway	Lalah Hathaway Live	R&B, soul, pop	eOne Music	
October 30	M.E.D., Blu, and Madlib	Bad Neighbor	Hip-hop	Bang Ya Head	
October 30	Mette Henriette	Mette Henriette	Jazz	ECM	
October 30	My Disco	Severe		Temporary Residence Limited	
October 30	The Neighbourhood	Wiped Out!	Alternative rock, R&B, post-rock	Columbia	
October 30	Puscifer	Money Shot	Alternative rock, post-industrial	Puscifer Entertainment	
October 30	Roots Manuva	Bleeds	Hip-hop	Big Dada	
October 30	Shigeto	Intermission		Ghostly International	
October 30	Skindred	Volume	Nu metal	Napalm	
October 30	Steve Martin & Edie Brickell	So Familiar	Bluegrass	Rounder	
October 30	Tina Arena	Eleven	Pop, R&B, soul	Positive Dream, EMI Australia	
October 30	Trey Anastasio	Paper Wheels	Rock	Rubber Jungle	
October 30	Trust Fund	Seems Unfair		Turnstile Records	
October 31	Cassper Nyovest	Refiloe	Hip-hop, motswako, house	Family Tree, Universal South Africa	

=== November ===
List of albums released in November 2015
Go to: January | February | March | April | May | June | July | August | September | October | November | December | Back to top
Release date	Artist	Album	Genre	Label	Ref.
November 3	Eric Church	Mr. Misunderstood	Country, rock, blues	EMI Nashville	
November 4	Puff Daddy & the Family	MMM (Money Making Mitch)	East Coast hip-hop	Bad Boy, Epic	
November 6	Anastacia	Ultimate Collection		Sony Music	
November 6	Angie Stone	Dream	Soul	Shanachie	
November 6	Billy Gibbons and the BFG's	Perfectamundo	Blues rock, Afro-Cuban	Concord	
November 6	Birds of Tokyo	Playlist	Alternative rock, indie rock	Birds of Tokyo, EMI Music Australia	
November 6	Björk	Vulnicura Strings	Chamber	One Little Indian	
November 6	CeeLo Green	Heart Blanche	Soul, neo soul	Atlantic	
November 6	Dawid Podsiadło	Annoyance and Disappointment		Sony Music	
November 6	Devil You Know	They Bleed Red	Metalcore	Nuclear Blast	
November 6	Ellie Goulding	Delirium	Synth-pop, dance	Polydor	
November 6	Extreme Noise Terror	Extreme Noise Terror		Willowtip Records	
November 6	Grimes	Art Angels	Synth-pop, dance, art pop	4AD	
November 6	Jamie Woon	Making Time	Electronica, trip hop, R&B	Polydor	
November 6	Joe Moore	A Thousand Lifetimes	Pop	Decca, Universal Australia	
November 6	Kate Boy	One		Iamsound	
November 6	Khruangbin	The Universe Smiles upon You		Night Time Stories	
November 6	Kode9	Nothing		Hyperdub	
November 6	Lacrimosa	Hoffnung	Gothic metal, gothic rock	Hall of Sermon	
November 6	Laura Pausini	Simili	Latin pop	Warner Italy	
November 6	Little Mix	Get Weird	Synth-pop, dance-pop, R&B	Syco, Columbia	
November 6	MC Lars	The Zombie Dinosaur LP	Nerdcore, ska punk, West Coast hip-hop	Horris Records, Crappy, Oglio	
November 6	Molly Nilsson	Zenith	Synth-pop	Dark Skies Association, Night School Records	
November 6	Mylène Farmer	Interstellaires	Electronica, synth-pop	Polydor	
November 6	Sara Bareilles	What's Inside: Songs from Waitress	Pop rock, soul	Epic	
November 6	Seal	7	Soul, R&B	Warner Bros.	
November 6	Steak Number Eight	Kosmokoma			
November 6	Tim McGraw	Damn Country Music	Country	Big Machine	
November 11	Nana Mizuki	Smashing Anthems	J-pop	King	
November 13	Alessia Cara	Know-It-All	R&B, pop	Def Jam, UMG	
November 13	Anna von Hausswolff	The Miraculous	Folk metal, neoclassical, art pop	Pomperipossa Records, City Slang, Other Music	
November 13	Ben Haenow	Ben Haenow	Pop, pop rock	Syco, RCA	
November 13	Boots	Aquaria	Alternative R&B, experimental hip-hop	Columbia	
November 13	Casting Crowns	A Live Worship Experience	Worship, CCM, Christian rock	Beach Street, Reunion	
November 13	DJ Paypal	Sold Out	Footwork	Brainfeeder	
November 13	Girlschool	Guilty as Sin	Heavy metal	UDR Music	
November 13	A Great Big World	When the Morning Comes	Pop, pop rock	Epic, Black Magnetic	
November 13	Jeff Lynne's ELO	Alone in the Universe		Columbia	
November 13	Justin Bieber	Purpose	Pop	Def Jam, RBMG, Schoolboy	
November 13	Kerser	Next Step		Warner Australia	
November 13	King Gizzard & the Lizard Wizard	Paper Mâché Dream Balloon	Folk rock, psychedelic folk, psychedelic pop	Heavenly, ATO, Flightless	
November 13	Kurt Cobain	Montage of Heck: The Home Recordings	Grunge, field recordings	Universal	
November 13	Kutless	Surrender	Christian rock, hard rock, worship	BEC	
November 13	Kylie Minogue	Kylie Christmas	Christmas, traditional pop	Parlophone, Warner Bros.	
November 13	Le1f	Riot Boi	Hip-hop	XL, Terrible	
November 13	Logic	The Incredible True Story	Hip-hop	Def Jam, Visionary	
November 13	Moke	The Time Has Come			
November 13	Mutemath	Vitals	Synth-pop, alternative rock, psychedelic soul	Wojtek, Caroline, Sony Music Australia	
November 13	Neil Young	Bluenote Café	Blues rock, jump blues, heartland rock	Reprise	
November 13	One Direction	Made in the A.M.	Rock, pop rock	Columbia, Syco	
November 13	Oneohtrix Point Never	Garden of Delete	Electronic, experimental	Warp	
November 13	Redman	Mudface	Hip-hop	Gilla House Records, UMG	
November 13	Swallow the Sun	Songs from the North I, II & III	Death-doom, funeral doom	Century Media	
November 13	Train	Christmas in Tahoe	Christmas	Sunken Forest	
November 13	Ty Dolla Sign	Free TC	Hip-hop, R&B	Atlantic	
November 13	Wadada Leo Smith	Celestial Weather	Jazz	TUM Records	
November 16	Redlight	X Colour		Lobster Boy	
November 19	Cavanaugh (Serengeti & Open Mike Eagle)	Time and Materials	Hip-hop	MMG	
November 20	Adele	25	Pop, soul, R&B	XL, Columbia	
November 20	Anggun	Toujours un ailleurs	Pop	TF1	
November 20	Carter Burwell	Carol: Original Motion Picture Soundtrack		Varèse Sarabande	
November 20	Enya	Dark Sky Island	New-age, Celtic	Warner Music, Reprise	
November 20	Freddie Gibbs	Shadow of a Doubt	Hip-hop	ESGN, Empire	
November 20	Newton Faulkner	Human Love	Folk rock	BMG	
November 20	Samantha Jade	Nine	Dance-pop, pop	Sony Music Australia	
November 20	Tech N9ne	Strangeulation Vol. II	Hip-hop	Strange Music	
November 20	Yellow Claw	Blood for Mercy		Mad Decent	
November 23	Foo Fighters	Saint Cecilia	Rock	RCA	
November 25	Nick Carter	All American	Pop, pop rock, pop-punk	Kaotic, Inc	
November 27	Alyssa Reid	Phoenix		Wax Records	
November 27	The Arcs	The Arcs vs. The Inventors Vol. 1		Nonesuch	
November 27	The Corrs	White Light	Pop	East West	
November 27	Danzig	Skeletons		Evilive, Nuclear Blast	
November 27	Erykah Badu	But You Caint Use My Phone	R&B, soul, electronica	Motown, Control Freaq	
November 27	Leftöver Crack	Constructs of the State	Crust punk, anarcho-punk, ska punk	Fat Wreck Chords	
November 27	The Mekons and Robbie Fulks	Jura		Bloodshot	
November 27	Parquet Courts	Monastic Living	Experimental rock	Rough Trade	
November 27	Placebo	MTV Unplugged	Acoustic rock	Virgin EMI	
November 27	Pope Francis	Wake Up!	Christian, progressive rock	Believe Digital	
November 27	They Might Be Giants	Why?	Alternative rock	Idlewild Recordings, Lojinx	
November 27	The Vamps	Wake Up	Pop	Mercury, Virgin EMI	
November 30	BTS	The Most Beautiful Moment in Life, Pt. 2	Hip-hop, dance-pop, R&B	Big Hit	

=== December ===
List of albums released in December 2015
Go to: January | February | March | April | May | June | July | August | September | October | November | December | Back to top
Release date	Artist	Album	Genre	Label	Ref.
December 4	Babyface	Return of the Tender Lover	R&B	Def Jam	
December 4	Coldplay	A Head Full of Dreams	Alternative rock	Parlophone, Atlantic	
December 4	Fleur East	Love, Sax and Flashbacks	R&B, pop, hip-hop	Syco	
December 4	G-Eazy	When It's Dark Out	Hip-hop	RCA	
December 4	Ice Nine Kills	Every Trick in the Book	Metalcore, symphonic metal	Fearless	
December 4	Jeremih	Late Nights	R&B	Def Jam	
December 4	Kid Cudi	Speedin' Bullet 2 Heaven	Alternative rock, avant-garde, lo-fi	Republic, Wicked Awesome	
December 4	Rick Ross	Black Market	Hip-hop	Maybach, Slip-n-Slide, Def Jam	
December 4	Sarah Geronimo	The Great Unknown	Pop, R&B, dance	Viva	
December 4	Sigma	Life	Drum and bass	3Beat	
December 4	Sunn O)))	Kannon	Drone metal, noise	Southern Lord	
December 4	Troye Sivan	Blue Neighbourhood	Electropop, dream pop	EMI Music Australia, Capitol	
December 10	Archy Marshall	A New Place 2 Drown	Trip hop, post-dubstep, alternative hip-hop	True Panther, XL	
December 11	Cam	Untamed	Country	Arista Nashville, RCA	
December 11	EMA	#Horror: Original Score by EMA		Matador	
December 11	Enterprise Earth	Patient 0	Deathcore	Stay Sick	
December 11	jennylee	right on!	New wave	Rough Trade	
December 11	Lizzo	Big Grrrl Small World	Hip-hop	BGSW	
December 11	R. Kelly	The Buffet	R&B	RCA	
December 11	Secrets	Everything That Got Us Here	Post hardcore, melodic metalcore	Rise, Velocity Records	
December 11	Soulsavers	Kubrick		San Quentin Recordings	
December 11	Spoken	Breathe Again	Hard rock	Artery	
December 11	Willow	Ardipithecus	Neo soul	Roc Nation, Interscope	
December 12	Prince	Hit n Run Phase Two	Funk, soul, pop	NPG, Universal	
December 18	Ariana Grande	Christmas & Chill	Christmas, R&B	Republic	
December 18	Baroness	Purple	Alternative rock	Abraxan Hymns	
December 18	Bloodhound Gang	Hard-Off		Jimmy Franks Recording Company	
December 18	Cage the Elephant	Tell Me I'm Pretty	Indie rock, indie rock	RCA	
December 18	Cass McCombs	A Folk Set Apart	Indie rock	Domino	
December 18	Chris Brown	Royalty	R&B, alternative R&B	RCA	
December 18	JoJo	LoveJo2	hip-hop soul, R&B	Atlantic	
December 18	Monica	Code Red	R&B	RCA	
December 18	Pusha T	King Push – Darkest Before Dawn: The Prelude	Hip-hop	GOOD, Def Jam	
December 18	What So Not	Gemini		Owsla	
December 19	Tiwa Savage	R.E.D	Pop, Afro-pop, reggae	Mavin, 323 Entertainment	
December 24	iKON	Welcome Back	Dance-pop, K-pop	YG	
December 25	Cui Jian	Frozen Light	Alternative rock	Sony Music	
December 25	Kid Ink	Summer in the Winter	Hip-hop	RCA	
