= Self control (disambiguation) =

Self-control is the motivation to control oneself.

Self control or Self Control may also refer to:

== Music ==
- Self Control (album), a 1984 album by Laura Branigan
- "Self Control" (Raf song), 1984, covered by Laura Branigan the same year
- "Self Control" (Dukes song), 2010
- "Self Control" (Frank Ocean song), 2016, from the album Blonde of the same year
- "Self Control" (Youngboy Never Broke Again song), 2019
- "Self Control", by Bebe Rexha from the 2018 album Expectations
- "Self Control", by Kate Boy from the 2015 album One
- "Self Control", by Scissor Sisters from the 2012 album Magic Hour
- "Self Control", by Shea Couleé from the 2023 album 8
- "Self Control", a 1970 song by The Upsetters

== Film and television ==
- Self Control (film), 1938 Donald Duck film
- "Self Control" (Agents of S.H.I.E.L.D.), season 4 episode

== Literature ==
- Self-Control (novel), a novel by Scottish novelist Mary Brunton

== See also ==
- No Self Control (disambiguation)
