= Brian Lawrence (disambiguation) =

Brian, Bryan or Bryon, Lawrence or Lawrance may refer to:

- Brian Lawrence (born 1976), American baseball player
- Brian Turner Tom Lawrence (1873-1946), English recipient of the Victoria Cross
- Bryan Lawrence (politician) (born 1970), American politician
- Brian Lawrance (1909-1983), Australian singer and violinist
- Byron Lawrence (born 1996), English footballer
- Brian Lawrence, additional staff on Christ Be Glorified
