= Shadow of the Sun (disambiguation) =

Shadow of the Sun is a 2015 album by Moon Duo.

Shadow of the Sun, The Shadow of the Sun, or In the Shadow of the Sun may also refer to:

- The Shadow of the Sun, a 1998 book by Ryszard Kapuściński
- In the Shadow of the Sun, a 1981 fantasy short film
- The Shadow of the Sun (film), a 2023 Venezuelan film
- Shadows on the Sun, a 2003 Brother Ali album
- Shadows of the Sun, a 2007 Ulver album
- In the Shadow of the Sun (album), a 1981 Throbbing Gristle musical score
