= No Self Control =

No Self Control may refer to:

- No Self Control (album), by The Planet Smashers, 2001
- "No Self Control" (The Pillows song), 1999
- "No Self Control" (Peter Gabriel song), 1979

== See also ==
- Self control (disambiguation)
