= Cancer (My Disco album) =

Studio album by My Disco
- Released: November 7, 2006
- Genres: Math rock, minimalist
- Length: 24:56
- Label: Numerical Thief / Stomp
- Producer: link

My Disco chronology
Cancer (2006)	Paradise (2008)

Singles from Cancer
- 1. "Perfect Protection"

Cancer is an album by My Disco, released on November 7, 2006. The album marked a change in direction for the band, further into math rock, shifting towards minimalism, a theme further explored and refined in the following album Paradise. The album was recorded in mid-2006.

The album was released through Numerical Thief. It was also released on vinyl.

Many of the song titles and lyrics relate to a general cancer diagnosis and treatment theme.

== Track listing ==
All songs written by My Disco.

1. "Perfect Protection"
2. "A Marker"
3. "Calling Cure"
4. "Always Measure Wait"
5. "Pale"
6. "Patterns Surgical"
7. "St."
8. "Administer A Prosthetic Dream"
