= Severe (album) =

Studio album by My Disco
- Released: 30 October 2015
- Label: Temporary Residence Limited
- Producer: Cornel Wilczek

My Disco chronology
Little Joy (2011)	Severe (2015)	Environment (2019)

Severe is the fourth album by Australian experimental trio, My Disco, which was released via Temporary Residence Limited on 30 October 2015. It was short-listed for the 2015 Australian Music Prize.

== Background ==
During the five years following the release of My Disco's third album, Little Joy, and its associated tour, lead guitarist Ben Andrews moved to Jakarta. His brother Liam Andrews, on bass guitar and lead vocals, was living between London and Barcelona, while drummer Rohan Rebeiro was living in Melbourne. The tracks on Severe were written during a three-month period, from April to June 2014. According to Liam, the distance between fellow members made the recording process more "exciting". Unlike the band's two previous albums, Paradise (2008) and Little Joy (2010), which were produced by Steve Albini, Severe was produced by Cornel Wilczek – a film music composer.

== Critical reception ==
Professional ratings
Review scores
Source	Rating
AllMusic	3.5/5 stars
New Noise	4/5 stars
Ox-Fanzine	3.5/5 stars
Rolling Stone Australia	3.5/5 stars
The Sydney Morning Herald	4/5 stars
Vice Germany	6/10
The Weekend Australian	3/5 stars

Severe received largely positive reviews. Outlets such as Chicago Reader, Spex, and The Quietus praised the album's harsh, uncompromising sound.

Music website The Quietus listed Severe as the 30th best album of 2015. Dave Segal of The Stranger put Severe at the number seven spot on his list of "Top 10 Records of 2015 That Dave Segal Dares You to Check Out If You Think You Can Even Handle It". It was short-listed for the 2015 Australian Music Prize.

== Personnel ==
Credits adapted from liner notes

My Disco

- Liam Andrews – bass guitar, electronics, vocals
- Ben Andrews – guitar
- Rohan Rebeiro – drums, percussion

Additional personnel

- Rashad Becker: mastering engineer
- Falko Ohlmer: art direction, design
- Cornel Wilczek: audio engineering, mixer, production
