= Dancing at the Blue Lagoon =

Studio album by Cayucas
- Released: June 23, 2015
- Genre: Rock
- Length: 35:42
- Label: Secretly Canadian
- Producer: Ryan Hadlock

Cayucas chronology
Bigfoot (2013)	Dancing at the Blue Lagoon (2015)	Real Life (2019)

Professional ratings
Aggregate scores
Source	Rating
Metacritic	56/100
Review scores
Source	Rating
AllMusic	4/5 stars
Consequence	D+
Paste	7.6/10
Under the Radar	6.5/10

Dancing at the Blue Lagoon is the second studio album by American indie pop band Cayucas. It was released in June 2015 under Secretly Canadian.

== Track listing ==
No.	Title	Length
1.	"Big Winter Jacket"	4:46
2.	"Moony Eyed Walrus"	3:37
3.	"Hella"	4:11
4.	"Champion"	3:51
5.	"Ditches"	3:57
6.	"Dancing at the Blue Lagoon"	4:28
7.	"Backstroke"	4:11
8.	"A Shadow in the Dark"	4:27
9.	"Blue Lagoon (Theme Song)"	2:04
