= My Disco =

Australian band

MY DISCO
- Origin: Melbourne, Victoria, Australia
- Genres: Industrial, post-punk, minimalist,
- Years active: 2003–present
- Labels: Downwards; Temporary Residence Limited
- Members: Rohan Rebeiro; Liam Andrews; Ben Andrews

MY DISCO (stylized in capitals) is an Australian music group formed in 2003 by brothers Ben and Liam Andrews. It includes members from Agents of Abhorrence and Clann Zú.

== Background ==
MY DISCO was formed in 2003 in Melbourne, Australia, by brothers Ben and Liam Andrews (both originally from London) and Rohan Rebeiro. Their name comes from a song by Big Black.

Residing between London and Melbourne since 2010, their first public appearance was performed at The Good Morning Captain, a café and performance space in Collingwood, a suburb of Melbourne. MY DISCO became known for its unconventional venues, having organized performances on side-walks, in galleries, and warehouses.

The band founded their own record label, Crashing Jets, to release their own music. Following a limited cassette release, the band released a 7'', Collapse of an Erratic Lung (November 2003), and a 10'', Language of Numbers (September 2004, also available as a CD), both on Crashing Jets.

November 2003 marked their first Australian tour. The band soon became renowned for their arduous tour ethic, demonstrated in extensive tours of remote areas of Australia and Southeast Asia.

After a hiatus due to Liam Andrews' diagnosis of Hodgkin's Disease, their debut album Cancer was released in 2006. They toured the album to the United States, New Zealand, and the United Kingdom, as well as appearing at the Meredith Music Festival in Victoria.

In October 2007, the band recorded their second album, entitled Paradise, at Electrical Audio with Steve Albini of Shellac. An extensive world tour in support of the album followed, including a performance at SXSW in Austin, Texas.

In 2010, the band signed to the New York record label, Temporary Residence Limited and released their third album, Little Joy. Recording started in March 2010 at Electrical Audio with once again Steve Albini as engineer. The album received the Australian Independent Record (AIR) Award for 'Best Hard Rock or Punk Album' in 2011.

In 2015, MY DISCO released their fourth studio album, entitled Severe. It was their first studio album to be recorded with film composer Cornel Wilzcek at Electric Dreams Studio in Melbourne, Australia. Severe captures the subtleness and high concentration levels of MY DISCO's renowned minimalist approach to dark and heavy instrumentation. Previously known for their stark and consistent rhythmic structures, Severe takes on a new approach of aggravated tonal darkness, exploring a heavily affected extremely dynamic writing style. Severe was nominated and shortlisted into the final for the AMP Australian Music Prize.

Following the release of Severe, the band released a Remix 12-inch on Karl O'Connor's label Downwards Records featuring Regis and Lustmord reworking the tracks 1991 and Our Decade.

In 2018, MY DISCO recorded their 5th studio album with Boris Wilsdorf at Einstürzende Neubauten's studio andereBaustelle in Berlin. Their most uncompromising recording to date, the album was released through Downwards Records. Written over a two-week period during Berlin winter 2018, the band decided to let their surroundings shape the sound of their new material. Recorded in a place that has seen Einstürzende Neubauten, Keiji Heino and Pan Sonic pen works, the band became immersed within the confines of the space and immediate surroundings and set to create a record that has become a dark and intense departure from their previous releases.

Following the release of Environment, the band were invited to perform at the 2019 Berlin Atonal at the Kraftwerk Berlin.

== Members ==
- Liam Andrews - bass, electronics, vocals
- Ben Andrews - guitar
- Rohan Rebeiro - drums, percussion

== Discography ==
=== Studio albums ===
- Cancer (2006)
- Paradise (2008)
- Little Joy (Temporary Residence Limited, 2010)
- Severe (Temporary Residence Limited, 2015)
- Environment (Downwards Records, 2019)
- Alter Schwede (Heavy Machinery Records, 2021)

=== Singles and EPs ===
- "Collapse of an Erratic Lung" 7-inch (2003, Crashing Jets); Mini CD EP Rerelease (2005, Eerie Stratum)
- "Language of Numbers" 10-inch and CD EP (2004, Crashing Jets)
- "Collapse of an Erratic Lung/Language of Numbers" CD Rerelease (2005, Golden Brown Recordings)
- "Some Clown (Off Minor) b/w Troubled Receiver (MY DISCO)" 7-inch (2005, Golden Brown Recordings)
- "Antler" split 7-inch with Young Widows (Temporary Residence Limited, 2009)
- "Young/You" CD (Blast First Petite, 2010)
- "Wrapped Coast/All I Can Do" 12-inch (Temporary Residence Limited, 2012)
- "Severe Remixes" (Downwards Records, 2016)
- "Environment Remixes" (Downwards Records, 2020)

=== Live albums ===
- "Atlanta" (2010, hellosQuare recordings)

== Awards and nominations ==
=== Spirit of Youth Award ===
The Qantas Spirit of Youth Award is an annual award recognizing young Australians in recognition of one of 11 creative pursuits. It comes with $5,000 cash, $5,000 worth of air travel, and a 12-month mentorship opportunity with an experienced member of their professional field. My Disco won in the music category in 2008, beating out Catcall and Cloud Control. The mentor with whom they were given the opportunity to work waasroducer Scott Horscroft (Silverchair, The Panics).

=== Australian Music Prize ===
The Australian Music Prize (the AMP) is an annual award of $30,000 given to an Australian band or solo artist in recognition of the merit of an album released during the year of award. The commenced in 2005.

Year	Nominee / work	Award	Result
2015	Severe	Australian Music Prize	Nominated
