= Cayucas =

American indie pop band

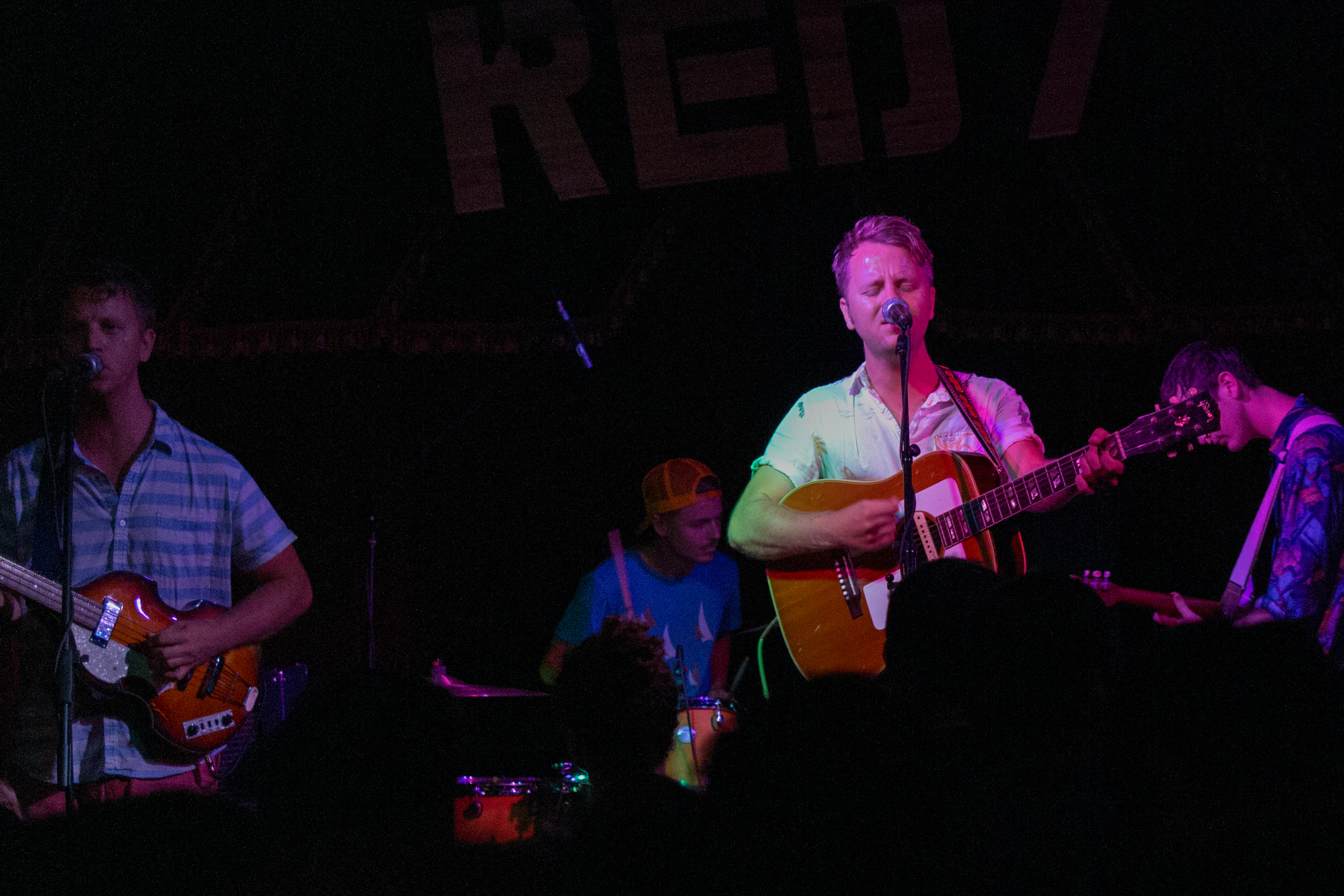
- Cayucas live 2013

Background information
- Also known as: Oregon Bike Trails (2011–2012)
- Origin: Santa Monica, California, United States
- Genres: Indie pop, surf pop, lo-fi
- Years active: 2011–present
- Members: Zach Yudin; Ben Yudin
- Website: cayucas.com

Cayucas, previously Oregon Bike Trails, is an American indie pop band from Santa Monica, California. The group includes Zach Yudin as the principle songwriter and lead vocals and twin brother Ben Yudin on guitar. The band signed to Secretly Canadian in 2012.

== History ==
=== 2011: Oregon Bike Trails ===
Zach Yudin, then a musician for nearly five years, posted his first song under the name Oregon Bike Trails on January 18, 2011. He was associated with Father/Daughter Records in the early part of his career.

=== 2012: Secretly Canadian ===
In 2012, Yudin expanded from a solo project to a band and he officially changed the group's name from Oregon Bike Trails to Cayucas. Cayucas signed with indie record label Secretly Canadian in October 2012, and soon after released a single, "Swimsuit," and announced a tour with Ra Ra Riot for February 2013.

=== 2013: Bigfoot ===
In February 2013, Cayucas announced a handful of European tour dates. In March, the band performed in a Secretly Canadian showcase at South by Southwest. Their debut full-length album Bigfoot, was released on April 30 by Secretly Canadian. The album was produced by fellow Secretly Canadian artist Richard Swift.

=== 2015: Dancing at the Blue Lagoon ===
The single "Moony Eyed Walrus" was released by Secretly Canadian on April 29, 2015, ahead of the sophomore album entitled Dancing at the Blue Lagoon, out June 23, 2015. The band enlisted Ryan Hadlock to engineer and produce the record. Davey Brozowski played drums and percussion on the record while Mat Santos and Rebecca Zeller of Ra Ra Riot played bass and strings.

=== 2019: Real Life ===
The band's third album Real Life was released on April 19, 2019, and was preceded by the single "Jessica WJ".

=== 2020: Blue Summer ===
The band's fourth album, preceded with singles "Yeah Yeah Yeah" and "California Girl".

== Discography ==
=== Studio albums ===
List of extended plays, with selected information
Title	Album details
Bigfoot	Released: April 30, 2013; Label: Secretly Canadian; Formats: CD, digital download
Dancing at the Blue Lagoon	Released: June 23, 2015; Label: Secretly Canadian; Formats: CD, digital download
Real Life	Released: April 19, 2019; Label: Park the Van / Cayucas; Formats: CD, digital download, vinyl
Blue Summer	Released: September 25, 2020; Label: Park the Van / Cayucas; Formats: CD, digital download, vinyl

=== Singles ===
Year	Title	Album
2012	"Cayucos/Swimsuit'"	Bigfoot
2013	"High School Lover"	Bigfoot
2013	"East Coast Girl"	Bigfoot
2015	"Moony Eyed Walrus"	Dancing at the Blue Lagoon
2018	"Jessica WJ"	Real Life
2020	"Yeah Yeah Yeah"	Blue Summer
2020	"Lonely Without You"	Blue Summer
2020	"Malibu '79 Long"	Blue Summer
