= Paradise (My Disco album) =

Studio album by My Disco
- Released: 23 February 2008
- Recorded: Late 2007
- Genre: Math rock, minimalist, dance
- Length: 38:30
- Label: Numerical Thief / Stomp

My Disco chronology
Cancer (2006)	Paradise (2008)

Professional ratings
Review scores
Source	Rating
Polaroids of Androids	8.6/10

Paradise is an album by My Disco, released on 23 February 2008. The cover photo was one of a series taken by Warwick Baker amongst opal mines in South Australia. The album marked a further shift towards minimalism, a continuing theme from the previous album Cancer. The album was recorded in late 2007 at Electrical Audio studios in Chicago, by Steve Albini.

It was released through the band's Numerical Thief label with distribution through Shock. The album was also released on vinyl. A Japanese version was released in January 2009 with new cover art and bonus tracks. A US vinyl only version was released in March 2009 with new cover art by Louisville, Kentucky-based label Fruits and Vegetables.

The official album launch was on 22 March at The Corner Hotel with Kes Band and Fabulous Diamonds.

== Track listing ==
All songs written by My Disco.

1. "|" – 1:38
2. "You Came To Me Like A Cancer Lain Dormant Until It Blossomed Like A Rose" – 2:56
3. "/" – 3:22
4. "Paradise" - 2:45
5. "An Even Sun - 9:05
6. "Mosaics" - 5:20
7. "A Christ Pendent Comfort Her Neck" - 3:34
8. "Pair & Pear" - 2:27
9. "German For Attention" - 3:22
10. "Land" - 3:49
