= Kate Boy =

Swedish synthpop duo

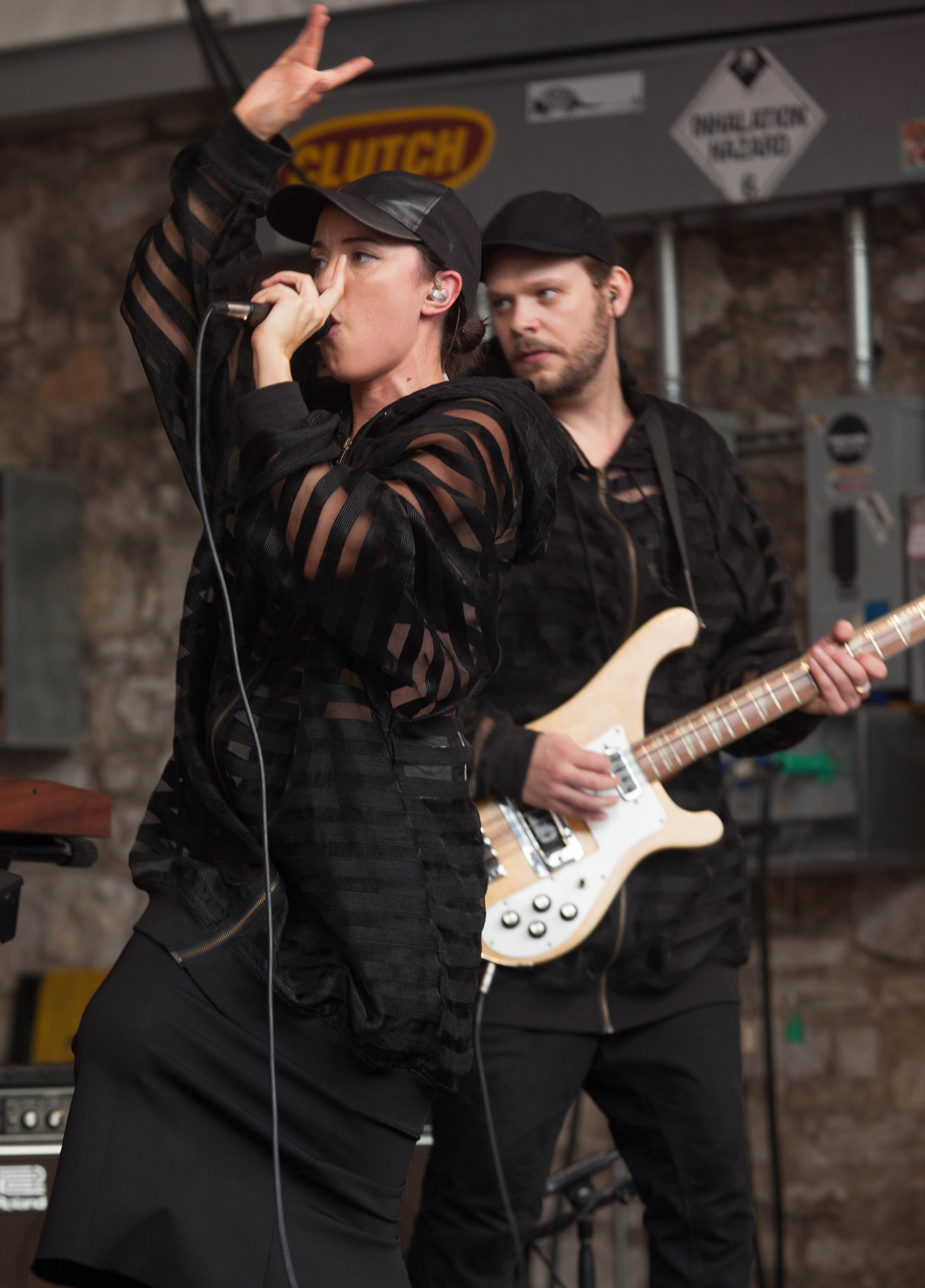
- Kate Boy performing at SXSW in 2015.

Background information
- Origin: Stockholm, Sweden
- Genres: Synth-pop
- Years active: 2012–present
- Labels: IAMSOUND
- Members: Kate Akhurst; Markus Dextegen
- Past members: Hampus Nordgren Hemlin; Oskar Sikow

Kate Boy are a Swedish synth-pop duo from Stockholm. The group was founded by Kate Akhurst, from Australia, and Markus Dextegen, from Sweden, together with former Swedish members Hampus Nordgren Hemlin and Oskar Sikow. All members have participated in writing, producing and playing instruments. They released their debut studio album, One, in November 2015.

== Discography ==
=== Studio albums ===
- One (2015)

=== Extended plays ===
- Kate Boy (2015)
- The Remix EP (2015)

=== Singles ===
- "Northern Lights" (2012)
- "The Way We Are" (2013)
- "Self Control" (2014)
- "Open Fire" (2014)
- "Midnight Sun" (2015)
- "True Colours" (2017)
- "Dopamin" (2018)
- “Giants” (2018)

=== Music videos ===
- "Northern Lights" (2012)
- "In Your Eyes" (2013)
- "The Way We Are" (2013)
- "Midnight Sun" (2015)
- "True Colours" (2017)

=== Remixes ===
- Tove Lo – "Timebomb" (2015)
