= From Safer Place =

Studio album by Fawn Spots
- Released: March 2015 (Note: PopMatters lists the album's release date as 10 March, AllMusic and Drowned in Sound both have 9 March, and Metacritic says 24 March.)
- Genre: Hardcore punk, post-punk
- Length: 24:52
- Label: Critical Heights

Professional ratings
Aggregate scores
Source	Rating
Metacritic	71/100
Review scores
Source	Rating
AllMusic	3.5/5 stars
Drowned in Sound	7/10
PopMatters	(7/10)
Record Collector	3/5 stars

From Safer Place is the debut studio album by English band Fawn Spots. It was released in March 2015 under Critical Heights.

== Background ==
Fawn Spots are an English post-punk band from York, formed in the early 2010s. (Note: Per Louder Than War in February 2012, the band "have only been doing this for a little over a year.") The band described their influences as including the bands of Dischord Records, especially Fugazi and Minor Threat, Hüsker Dü, No Age, Comet Gain, Television Personalities, Xiu Xiu, Berlin techno, Modeselektor, and BPitch.

== Track listing ==
No.	Title	Length
1.	"New Sense"	2:23
2.	"I'm Not a Man; I Never Will Be"	1:07
3.	"A Certain Pleasure"	2:23
4.	"Black Water"	3:04
5.	"Natural Vision"	2:48
6.	"From Safer Place"	1:59
7.	"Remains"	2:08
8.	"In Front of the Chestnut Tree"	2:30
9.	"Recurring Face"	2:16
10.	"Basque Knife"	4:04
