= Moon Duo =

American psychedelic rock band

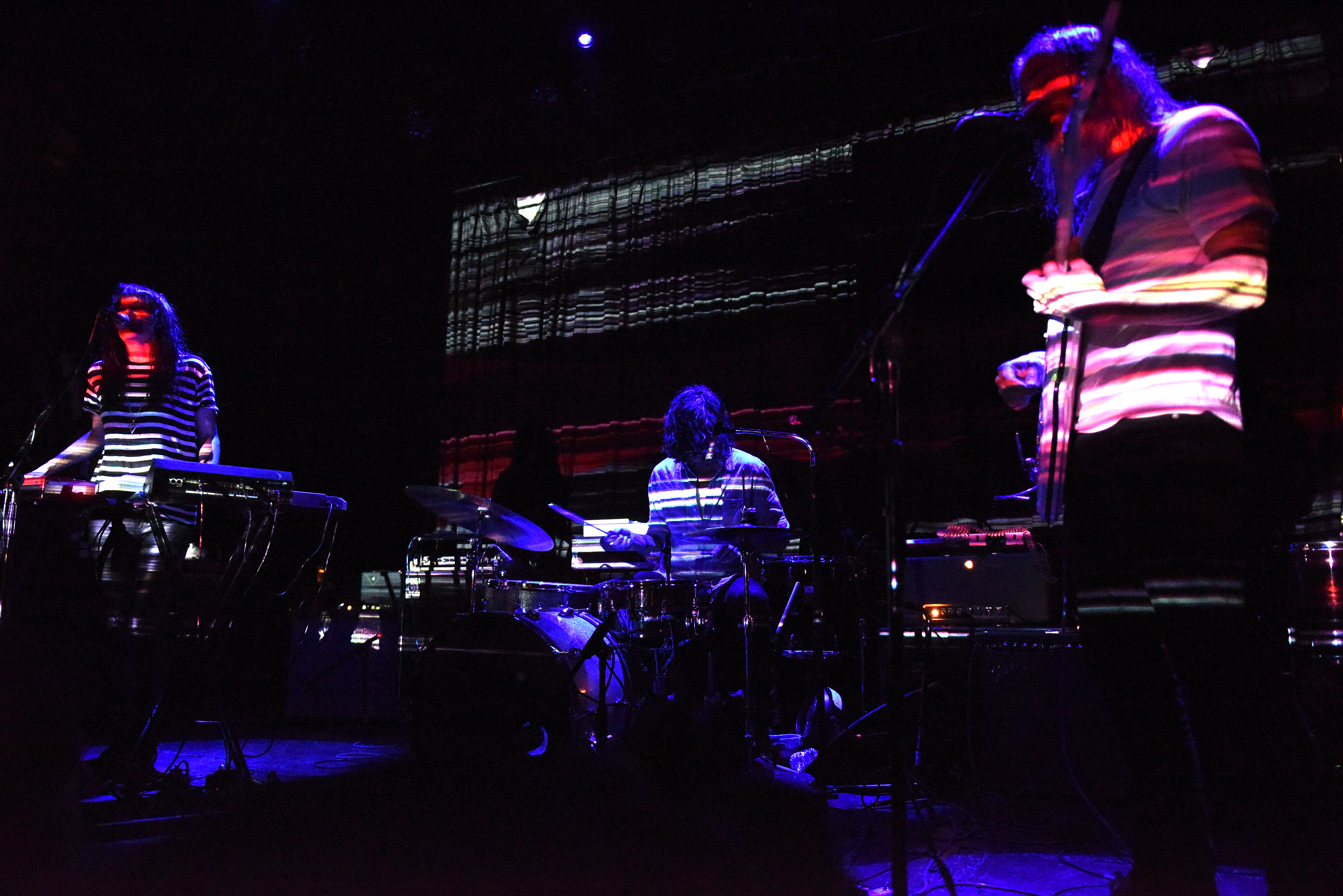
- Moon Duo performing at the Bowery Ballroom in NYC

Background information
- Origin: San Francisco, California
- Genres: Psychedelic rock, garage rock, alternative rock, punk blues, garage punk, blues rock
- Years active: 2009–present
- Label: Sacred Bones Records
- Members: Ripley Johnson; Sanae Yamada
- Website: moonduo.org

Moon Duo is a psychedelic rock band from San Francisco, California formed in 2009 by Wooden Shjips guitarist Ripley Johnson and Sanae Yamada.

== History ==
Their debut album Mazes was released on Sacred Bones Records in 2011. The band's style is inspired by psychedelic rock, combining repetitive rhythms and saturated guitars. Their influences include Alan Vega of Suicide, Spacemen 3 and Silver Apples. The band's seventh full-length album, Stars Are the Light, was released on September 27, 2019.

Their most recent album, Stars Are the Light was released to favorable reviews. Stereogum named it album of the week on September 19, 2019, saying "With their latest album, Moon Duo were thinking about dance, and as such Stars Are the Light comes with surprising touchstones, with Johnson and Yamada looking back to '70s funk and disco." Metacritic assigned the album a weighted average score of 77 out of 100 from 11 critic scores.

== Discography ==
=== Studio albums ===
- Escape (2010)
- Mazes (2011)
- Circles (2012)
- Shadow of the Sun (2015)
- Occult Architecture Vol. 1 (2017)
- Occult Architecture Vol. 2 (2017)
- Stars Are the Light (2019)

=== Singles ===
- Planet Caravan (2020)

=== EPs ===
- Killing Time (2009)

=== Compilations ===
- Occult Architecture Vols 1 & 2 (2017)

=== Remixes ===
- Mazes Remixed (2011)
- Circles Remixed (2013)

=== Live albums ===
- Live in Ravenna (2014)

== Awards and nominations ==
Award nominations for Moon Duo
Year	Nominated work	Category	Award	Result	Notes	Ref.
2013	"Sleepwalker"	Best Music Video	Berlin Music Video Awards	2nd place	—	
2013	"Sleepwalker"	Best Director/Actor	Berlin Music Video Awards	Won	—	
