= Dry Food =

Studio album by Palehound
- Released: 14 August 2015
- Recorded: October 2014
- Studios: Rare Book Room, Brooklyn
- Length: 28:37
- Labels: Exploding in Sound, Heavenly
- Producer: Gabe Wax

Palehound chronology
Dry Food (2015)	A Place I'll Always Go (2017)

Singles from Dry Food
- 1. "Molly" Released: June 2015

Dry Food is the debut album by US band Palehound. It was released on 14 August 2015 on record label Exploding in Sound.

== Background and release ==
Ellen Kempner released their debut EP as Palehound in October 2013 on Exploding In Sound. After its release Kempner dropped out of Sarah Lawrence College, went through a break-up, and moved from New York to Boston, during which time they wrote the songs for Dry Food.

Dry Food was recorded in October 2014. Kempner wrote all the musical arrangements, and played all instrumental parts except the drums. Lead single "Molly" was released in June 2015, and Stereogum noted a similarity to the sound of Kempner's roommate Sadie Dupuis of Speedy Ortiz. In 2016 Heavenly Recordings re-released the single as a 7", with a cover of Kelly Clarkson's Miss Independent as the B-side.

The album was released in the US on 14 August 2015 via Exploding In Sound, and in the UK on 4 March 2016 via Heavenly. In February and March 2016 Palehound toured the UK and Europe to support the album.

== Music ==
=== Musical style and instrumentation ===
Art Tavana of Paste Magazine explained: "Ellen Kempner’s guitar prowess is Palehound’s staff of light, a six-stringed burning ember that guides you through her fractured song structures and Complex dynamics keep the tracks from blending together into a giant collage. [...] The only constants are Kempner’s guitar and whispering vocals, which draw you into her dark world on tracks like 'Molly,' where her counter-melody guitar riff gets attacked by fuzzed-out power chords. Kempner’s soft vocals puncture the heart with earnestness on tracks like 'Dry Food' and create distance with the reverb-soaked 'Cinnamon,' where her voice interweaves masterfully with gently strummed chords." Timothy Monger of AllMusic said "the album's dryly textured production borders on lo-fi." Monger also said: "Even when tackling what at first seems like more straightforward indie pop on 'Cinnamon,' Kempner suddenly changes time signatures and introduces subtle psychedelic elements that keep everything slightly off-kilter."

=== Lyrical themes ===
The album is described as a "doleful take on coming-of-age" and "an eight-song exploration of Kempner’s mental inner space during the period of 2013 and ‘14." According to Tavana: "Dry Food bleeds with emotional truth through a thorny lineage to Kurt Cobain-esque dissociation and mental anguish—which is why it was written in isolation, with Kempner playing all the parts except for drums. Dry Food seems possessed by the ghost of Elliott Smith—there are painful reminders all over this record of what it feels like to be tortured, lonely, abused and directionless—which can be exhausting through eight sugar-free songs. Most of Kempner’s lyrics aren’t easy to decipher, either, but combined with nuanced minor key changes, and juxtaposed with her childlike falsetto, they remind you of the dark-twinkle in the eyes of Sylvia Plath, where nothing is as it seems."

== Artwork ==
The album's cover artwork is composed of "colorful travel-magazine cutouts."

== Critical reception ==
Professional ratings
Aggregate scores
Source	Rating
AnyDecentMusic?	7.4/10
Metacritic	78/100
Review scores
Source	Rating
AllMusic	4/5 stars
Consequence	B
DIY	3/5 stars
Loud and Quiet	7/10
MusicOMH	4/5 stars
Paste	7.8/10
Pitchfork	8.0/10
Record Collector	4/5 stars
Rolling Stone	4/5 stars
Spin	7/10

On review aggregator Metacritic the album holds a score of 78/100, based on 11 reviews, indicating a "generally favorable" reception.

Mike Katzif of NPR praised Kempner's skill as a guitarist, and wrote that "Dry Food is the sound of Ellen Kempner coming into her own musically." Will Hermes of Rolling Stone wrote that Kempner "plays the hell out of a guitar", and James Reed of the Boston Globe also praised their "guitar prowess."

== Track listing ==
All songs written by Ellen Kempner.

No.	Title	Length
1.	"Molly"	02:52
2.	"Healthier Folk"	03:11
3.	"Easy"	03:17
4.	"Cinnamon"	03:34
5.	"Dry Food"	04:28
6.	"Dixie"	03:29
7.	"Cushioned Caging"	03:05
8.	"Seekonk"	04:41
Total length:		28:37

== Personnel ==
- Ellen Kempner – guitar, bass, vocals, writing, arrangements
- Jesse Weiss – drums (tracks 1, 7, 8)
- Max Almario – drums (tracks 4, 5)
- Max Kupperberg – drums (tracks 2, 3, 4)
- Sam Owens – keyboards (tracks 2, 5)

Technical

- Gabe Wax – production
- Heba Kadry – mastering

Artistic

- Ellen Kempner – artwork
- Caitlin Bechdel – layout
