= Palehound =

American band

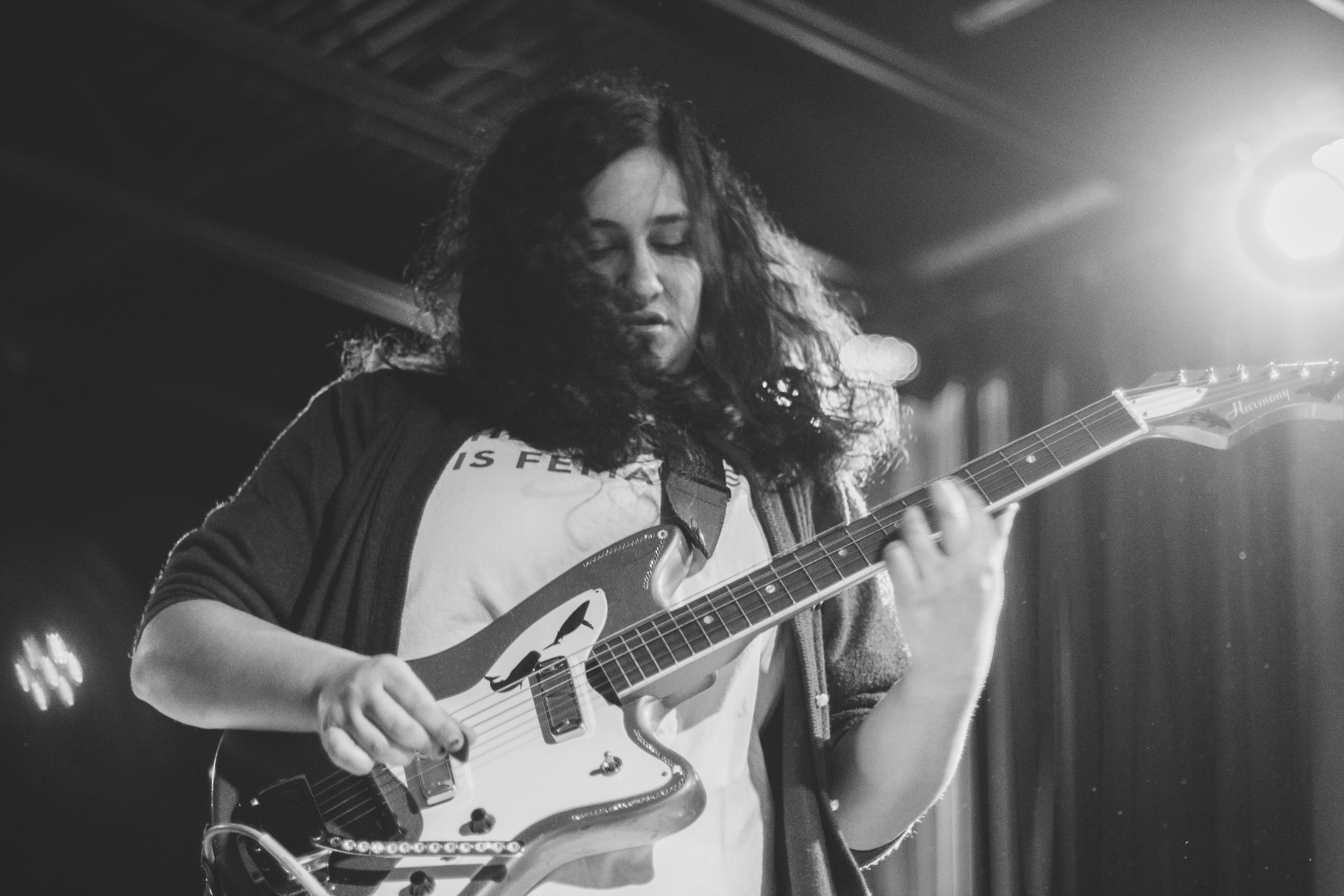
- Kempner performing on January 16, 2016

Background information
- Born: Ellen Kempner
- Genres: Rock; alternative
- Instrument: Guitar
- Years active: 2013–present
- Labels: Polyvinyl; Exploding in Sound; Heavenly
- Formerly of: Bachelor
- Members: El Kempner; Jamie Pompei; Beck Zegans; Miles Toth
- Past members: Jesse Weiss; David Khoshtinat; Zoë Brecher; Larz Brogan
- Website: www.palehound.com

Palehound is the project of El Kempner (they/them) who has released five albums, Dry Food (2015), A Place I'll Always Go (2017), Black Friday (2019), Eye on the Bat (2023) and Live at First Congregational Church (2024); as well as the Bent Nail EP (2013) and a number of 7" singles. Initially a solo project, the touring band currently features Kempner on vocals/guitar, Jamie Pompei on drums, Beck Zegans on guitar, and Miles Toth on bass. In 2015, the band received the Boston Music Award for new artist of the year.

== History ==
Together with a younger sister, El Kempner grew up in Westport, Connecticut, where they attended Staples High School. El developed an interest in playing music at an early age and was given guitar lessons by their father. In high school, they formed the band Cheerleader with drummer Max Kupperberg. During this time, Kempner recorded demos in GarageBand, which were later heard by Dan Goldin, the co-founder of Exploding in Sound.

In 2012, they moved to New York City, where they attended Sarah Lawrence College and studied music. There they recorded the six track EP Bent Nail with Carlos Hernandez and Julian Fader of Ava Luna. Their debut as Palehound was through the digital release of the song "Pet Carrot" in August 2013. The EP received a physical release through Exploding in Sound Records in October 2013. They later said, “when I first recorded [it], I was a little scared to put all the cards on the table." What initially had been a "bedroom recording project" was transferred to the live-stage. In 2013, Kempner's performance at CMJ was described as "unflinching, whimsical lyrics with pleasantly off-kilter guitar work." They dropped out of college and moved to Boston. In February 2014, the single "Kitchen" was released.

In August 2015, Palehound released the album Dry Food, produced by Gabe Wax in the US, and a UK release on Heavenly Records followed in March 2016. In the same month, the band embarked on a UK/European tour in support of the album. Kempner worked with Real to Reel Filmschool in Boston on a video for the song "Cushioned Caging" that appeared in June 2016.

On March 6, 2017, Kempner announced that Palehound had been signed by Polyvinyl Record Co.. Their 2017 album A Place I'll Always Go was released on June 16, and was followed by Black Friday in June 2019, described by Pitchfork as "reach[ing] far toward the hazy horizon, letting the nervous energy of Palehound's first two LPs mount and unspool."

In 2020, in light of the COVID-19 pandemic, Palehound contributed to a benefit compilation titled "The Song Is Coming From Inside The House." Organized by indie rock band Strange Ranger, proceeds from the 24-track album went to Groundswell's Rapid Response Fund, in order to support organizations led by women of color and transgender individuals.

On July 14, 2023, Palehound released their fourth album Eye on the Bat, to critical acclaim. In their review of the album, Pitchfork said that "Kempner’s songwriting is far from one-note, and the record’s winsome bombast finds the perfect foil in introspective details, moments of time trapped between the bars."

On October 13, 2023, Kempner was named one of the greatest guitar players of all time by Rolling Stone.

On August 16, 2024, Palehound released Live at First Congregational Church, a live solo album recorded by engineer Andrew Sarlo in Los Angeles during a string of shows Kempner supported for Adrianne Lenker of Big Thief in 2021.

== Lyrical style ==
Kempner describes their music as "journal rock", a term they explain in an interview with Sound of Boston: "it's kind of like journal-rock, just all of my biggest fears splurted onto some vinyl, no different from writing a diary, really."

== Discography ==
=== Albums ===
- Dry Food (2015)
- A Place I'll Always Go (2017)
- Black Friday (2019)
- Eye on the Bat (2023)

=== EPs ===
- Bent Nail (2013)

=== Singles ===
- "Kitchen" (2014)
- "Molly" (2016)
- "Worthy" (2019)
- "See a Light" (2020)
