= Full Bleed =

Studio album by Caught on Tape
- Released: February 10, 2015
- Recorded: September 2, 2013
- Studio: Sonelab (Easthampton, Massachusetts)
- Genres: Free improvisation; noise; black metal
- Length: 38:28
- Label: Northern Spy

Caught on Tape chronology
Banjaxed Blues (2013)	Full Bleed (2015)	Parallelogram (2015)

Singles from Full Bleed
- 1. "Full Bleed" Released: January 2015

Full Bleed is the debut studio album by the American duo Caught on Tape, a collaborative project by guitarist Thurston Moore and drummer John Moloney. It released on February 10, 2015, by Northern Spy Records.

== Background and recording ==
Prior to Full Bleed, Moore and Moloney were both members of the band Chelsea Light Moving and had released a string of live albums together as the Caught on Tape duo, beginning with their self-titled in 2012 and ending with Banjaxed Blues in 2013. Eventually, they were approached by Northern Spy Records to create a studio album, and although they were initially hesitant to the idea, they ultimately agreed, recording at Sonelab in Easthampton, Massachusetts on September 12, 2013. According to the engineer Justin Pizzoferatto, the sessions would have taken place earlier, but they were postponed. The recording spanned four hours, with mixing taking a similar time to complete.

== Promotion and release ==
In January 2015, the duo announced the album and led it with the title track. Full Bleed was released on February 10 by Northern Spy Records, made available digitally and on vinyl and CD. It was originally scheduled for release on October 12, 2014 but became delayed.

== Critical reception ==
Professional ratings
Aggregate scores
Source	Rating
Metacritic	65/100
Review scores
Source	Rating
AllMusic	3.5/5 stars
Exclaim!	8/10
The Line of Best Fit	3/10
Now	2/5 stars
Paste	8/10

According to the review aggregator Metacritic, Full Bleed received "generally favorable reviews" based on a weighted average score of 65 out of 100 from 5 critic scores.

== Track listing ==
All tracks are written by Thurston Moore and John Moloney.

Full Bleed track listing
No.	Title	Length
1.	"Age Limit"	3:30
2.	"Nothing Glamorous"	3:51
3.	"Full Bleed"	3:25
4.	"Self-rule"	2:13
5.	"Arguing with a Balloon"	5:21
6.	"Dispute"	6:26
7.	"Reverse Funeral"	4:27
8.	"Unsupervised"	4:28
9.	"Rubber Grandma"	4:47
Total length:		38:28

== Personnel ==
Credits are adapted from the LP liner notes.

- Thurston Moore – guitar
- John Moloney – drums, front cover photo
- Justin Pizzoferatto – engineering
- Mark Miller – mastering
- Sam Gaskin – back cover painting
- Greta Svalberg – LP label and sleeve artwork
