= A Readymade Ceremony =

Studio album by Félicia Atkinson
- Released: 17 March 2015
- Genres: Experimental; avant-garde
- Length: 34:07
- Label: Shelter Press

Félicia Atkinson chronology
Visions / Voices (2013)	A Readymade Ceremony (2015)	Hand in Hand (2017)

A Readymade Ceremony is a studio album by French musician Félicia Atkinson. It was released on 17 March 2015 through Shelter Press.

== Background ==
Félicia Atkinson, previously known as Je Suis le Petit Chevalier, is a French experimental musician and visual artist. A Readymade Ceremony is her solo album. The album drew inspiration from Georges Bataille, Henri Michaux, Jean Genet, John Cage, and Morton Feldman. It consists of five tracks. Prior to the album's release, a trailer video was released online. The album was released on 17 March 2015 through Shelter Press.

== Critical reception ==
Professional ratings
Review scores
Source	Rating
Pitchfork	7.7/10
Spin	8/10
Tiny Mix Tapes	4/5 stars

Adam Devlin of Tiny Mix Tapes described the album as "breathy, scratchy, and intimately placed music, a suite of rough hewn distortions and musique concrète that perform for their lyrics, near-theatrically so at times and in intimate nearness to the listener." Raymond Cummings of Spin commented that Félicia Atkinson "conjures an air of mischievous, mirthful myth so absolute that it puts other would-be enigmas to shame."

=== Accolades ===
Year-end lists for A Readymade Ceremony
Publication	List	Rank	Ref.
Pitchfork	The Best Experimental Albums of 2015	15	
Spin	The 20 Best Avant Albums of 2015	3	

== Track listing ==
A Readymade Ceremony track listing
No.	Title	Length
1.	"Against Archives"	7:05
2.	"L'Oeil"	10:21
3.	"The Book Is the Territory"	4:27
4.	"Carve the Concept and the Artichoke"	5:43
5.	"Recherche de la base et du sommet"	6:23
Total length:		34:07

== Personnel ==
Credits adapted from liner notes.

- Félicia Atkinson – music
- Helmut Erler – mastering
