= One (Kate Boy album) =

Studio album by Kate Boy
- Released: 6 November 2015
- Genres: Synth-pop, electropop
- Label: Iamsound Records

Singles from One
- 1. "Northern Lights"; 2. "The Way We Are"; 3. "Self Control"; 4. "Open Fire"; 5. "Midnight Sun"

One is the debut studio album by Swedish recording group Kate Boy, released on 6 November 2015 by Iamsound Records.

Professional ratings
Aggregate scores
Source	Rating
Metacritic	74/100
Review scores
Source	Rating
AllMusic	3.5/5 stars
Pitchfork	6.9/10

== Track listing ==
No.	Title	Length
1.	"Midnight Sun"	3:03
2.	"Northern Lights"	3:35
3.	"Lion for Real"	4:33
4.	"Human Engine"	4:45
5.	"Burn"	3:37
6.	"Higher"	3:59
7.	"Self Control"	3:41
8.	"When I Was Young"	3:50
9.	"The Way We Are"	4:13
10.	"Open Fire"	4:02
11.	"Run as One"	3:15
12.	"In Your Eyes _{(Bonus Track)}"	4:25
13.	"Temporary Gold _{(Bonus Track)}"	3:35
