= Shadow of the Sun =

Studio album by Moon Duo
- Released: 27 February 2015
- Recorded: 2013–2015
- Genres: Psychedelic rock, garage rock, krautrock
- Length: 42:41
- Label: Sacred Bones
- Producers: Erik "Ripley" Johnson; Sanae Yamada

Shadow of the Sun is an album by psychedelic punk duo Moon Duo. The group is a side project of psychedelic-space-drone rock band Wooden Shjips.

Professional ratings
Aggregate scores
Source	Rating
Metacritic	75/100
Review scores
Source	Rating
AllMusic	4/5 stars
DIY	2/5 stars
Drowned in Sound	7/10
Exclaim!	7/10
The Irish Times	4/5 stars
musicOMH	4/5 stars
Paste	7.5/10
Pitchfork Media	6.6/10
PopMatters	7/10 discs
The Skinny	4/5 stars

== Track list (CD) ==
1. Wilding - 4:58
2. Night Beat - 6:01
3. Free The Skull - 4:01
4. Zero - 3:10
5. In A Cloud - 5:58
6. Thieves - 3:34
7. Slow Down Low - 5:33
8. Ice - 7:14
9. Animal - 2:10

== Other versions ==
The Australian Deluxe edition Sacred Bones Records/Twelve Suns release (TSUN104CD) included a bonus disc Live in Ravenna, previously released on vinyl, with the additional track Set It On Fire, also previously released. Disc 1 is missing track 9, Animal.
