= Christ Be Glorified =

Studio album by BridgeCity
- Released: February 3, 2015
- Genre: Contemporary worship, electronic
- Length: 53:23
- Label: Maranatha!
- Producer: Brandon Bee

BridgeCity chronology
BridgeCity (2013)	Christ Be Glorified (2015)

Alternative cover
- Abandoned original concept cover

Professional ratings
Review scores
Source	Rating
New Release Tuesday	4/5 stars
Christian Review	4/5 stars

Christ Be Glorified is the second studio album from American contemporary worship music band BridgeCity. The album was released on February 3, 2015, under Maranatha! Music and distributed by Capitol Christian Distribution.

The album was debuted live and advertised through the annual Generation Unleashed youth conference in late January and early February, 2015 (located in Portland, Oregon).

== Track listing ==
No.	Title	Writer(s)	Length
1.	"Light A Fire"	Jeremy Scott	3:58
2.	"All That I Am"	Scott, Isaac Tarter	3:55
3.	"Always"	Scott	3:56
4.	"The Old Rugged Cross (I Am Free)"	George Bennard	3:50
5.	"Depths"	Brian Fora, Tarter	4:24
6.	"Christ Be Glorified"	Kim-Maree Janzen, Scott, Ben Haake	4:16
7.	"How We Need You Father"	Hannah Hategan	5:39
8.	"God You Are Good"	Adam Smucker, Scott	4:09
9.	"Face To Face"	Tarter	4:27
10.	"Awaken Hearts"	Fora, Scott	4:27
11.	"Nothing But The Blood (I'm New)"	Robert Lowry	5:05
12.	"Oh The Blood"	Scott	5:17
Total length:			53:23

Notes

- New verses on track 4 by Marcus Janzen, Jeremy Scott, and Isaac Tarter.
- New verses on track 11 by Julia Damazio and Isaac Tarter.

== Personnel ==
BridgeCity

- Jeremy Scott - lead vocals (1, 2, 4, 5, 9, 10, 12), acoustic guitar, executive producer
- Kim-Maree Janzen - lead vocals (3, 5), backing vocals
- Adam Smucker - lead vocals (6, 8), acoustic guitar
- Hannah Hategan - lead vocals (7)
- Isaac Tarter - lead vocals (11), keyboards
- Yasuhito Hontani - electric guitar
- Gabriel Adams - electric guitar
- Brandon Bee - slide guitar, tambourine, producer
- Jenny Civis - keyboards
- Nathan Scott - drums
- Joe Garibay - drums
- Jay Sudarma - drums

Gang vocals

- Isaac Tarter, Katrina Tarter, Marcus Janzen, Kim-Maree Janzen, Clint Guevara, Ethan Ebersole, Tyler Fitch, Jarius Trelenberg, Alex Damian, Narcis Damian, Jeff Borota, Jessica Borota, Nathan Ganz

Additional production

- Brian Lawrence - engineering
- David Benton - engineering
- Mine Bae - engineering
- Craig Alvin - mixing
- Shelley Anderson - mastering
- Jay Sundarma - graphic design

== Notes ==
- The band is based out of City Bible Church in Portland, Oregon and has been around since 1993 in the form of the worship band for the annual youth conference: Generation Unleashed. The group has previously released multiple live albums under the Generation Unleashed namesake.
- Though the album was available globally on February 3, 2015, those who attended the first week of the 2015 Generation Unleashed conference in late January were able to acquire the album physically almost a week early.
- As shown by a few professional music sites, there was an early discrepancy on the album's track listing regarding order and names of the songs.
