= Being You Is Great, I Wish I Could Be You More Often =

Studio album by Quelle Chris
- Released: February 10, 2017
- Genre: Underground hip-hop
- Length: 64:08
- Label: Mello Music Group
- Producers: Quelle Chris; Chris Keys; Ayepee; Alchemist; Chad Biscuits; Iman Omari; Mndsgn; Swarvy

Quelle Chris chronology
2Dirt4TV Three: Innocent Country (2015)	Being You Is Great, I Wish I Could Be You More Often (2017)	Everything's Fine (2018)

Being You Is Great, I Wish I Could Be You More Often is a solo studio album by American rapper and producer Quelle Chris. It was released via Mello Music Group on February 10, 2017. The seventeen-track record featured guest appearances by the likes of Roc Marciano, Homeboy Sandman, Denmark Vessey, Jean Grae, Elzhi, Cavalier, and Wasted Youth among others.

== Critical reception ==
Professional ratings
Review scores
Source	Rating
AllMusic	3.5/5 stars
Exclaim!	7/10
Flood Magazine	7/10
Pitchfork	7.6/10
PopMatters	6/10 stars
Tom Hull	B−
Vice (Expert Witness)	(2-star Honorable Mention)

Paul Simpson of AllMusic gave the album 3.5 stars out of 5, describing it as "an uneasy but truth-filled album of reflections and observations which should be easily relatable to moody, reserved types."

== Track listing ==
No.	Title	Producer(s)	Length
1.	"Intro"	Quelle Chris	0:30
2.	"Buddies"	Ayepee	3:37
3.	"Popeye" (featuring I Ced)	Mndsgn	3:33
4.	"In Case I Lose Myself" (featuring Cavalier, Denmark Vessey, and Goose)	Iman Omari	4:17
5.	"Fascinating Grass" (featuring Big Tone, Roc Marciano, and 87)	Quelle Chris	5:07
6.	"BS Vibes" (featuring House Shoes)	Chris Keys	4:40
7.	"Dumb for Brains" (featuring Cavalier)	Quelle Chris	2:41
8.	"Calm Before" (featuring Cavalier and Suzi Analogue)	Quelle Chris	5:04
9.	"The Prestige" (featuring Jean Grae)	Quelle Chris	5:03
10.	"The Dreamer in the Den of Wolves"	Quelle Chris	4:26
11.	"I'm That Nigga" (featuring Denmark Vessey)	Chris Keys	5:40
12.	"Birthdaze"	Swarvy	3:19
13.	"Learn to Love Hate"	Ched Biscuits	3:29
14.	"It's Great to Be" (featuring Bilal Salaam)	Chris Keys	4:59
15.	"Encore"	Quelle Chris	0:31
16.	"Don't Get Changed" (featuring Denmark Vessey and Elzhi)	Quelle Chris	2:51
17.	"Pendulum Swing" (featuring Homeboy Sandman)	Alchemist	4:21
Total length:			64:08
