= Deathfame =

Studio album by Quelle Chris
- Released: May 13, 2022
- Genre: Hip-hop
- Length: 41:59
- Label: Mello Music Group
- Producer: Chris Keys; Knxwledge; Quelle Chris

Quelle Chris chronology
Innocent Country 2 (2020)	Deathfame (2022)

Deathfame (stylized in all caps) is a solo studio album by American rapper and producer Quelle Chris. It was released via Mello Music Group on May 13, 2022. Production was handled by Chris Keys, Knxwledge, and Quelle Chris himself. It features guest appearances from Cavalier, Denmark Vessey, J Jig Cicero, MoRuf, Navy Blue, and Pink Siifu.

== Critical reception ==
Professional ratings
Aggregate scores
Source	Rating
Metacritic	81/100
Review scores
Source	Rating
AllMusic	3.5/5 stars
Beats Per Minute	77/100
Crack	7/10
HipHopDX	4.2/5
Pitchfork	7.8/10
The Needle Drop	7/10
Tom Hull	B+

Deathfame was met with acclaim from music critics. At Metacritic, which assigns a normalized rating out of 100 to reviews from mainstream publications, the album received an average score of 81, based on five reviews.

In his review for HipHopDX Matthew Ritchie wrote: "it's a continuation of his intense focus on a singular topic, which results in a clear elevation in quality that few could hope to achieve, setting the standard for any plan to follow his formula". Pitchfork reviewer Nadine Smith wrote: "balancing broad comedy with pointed political satire, the Detroit rapper continues his evolution from skilled MC to producer polymath on his latest album". Tim Sentz of Beats Per Minute wrote: "not since Everything's Fine has Quelle Chris sounded so surefire and determined. He wears beats with flair now, and lyrically he's in top form, moving like a chameleon behind the mic and in front. Deathfame is easily the best solo outing for Chris so far". In his YouTube channel The Needle Drop, Anthony Fantano stated: "Quelle Chris delivers what might be his most challenging album yet". AllMusic's Paul Simpson wrote: "even as Quelle Chris' music grows more challenging, it's still highly compelling, and his lyrics are filled with sharp, powerful observations about life, death, success, and failure". Writing for Crack Magazine, Dean Van Nguyen said: "the beats veer between jazz club grooves (the tinkling piano of So Tired You Can't Stop Dreaming featuring Navy Blue), smooth sophisti-pop (the saxophone riff of Die Happy Knowing They'll Care) and grubby loops that creep like a villain though rain-streaked streets at night".

=== Year-end lists ===
Deathfame year-end lists
Publication	#	Ref.
Crack	36	

== Track listing ==
No.	Title	Producer(s)	Length
1.	"TEYC"	Chris Keys; Quelle Chris	0:36
2.	"Alive Ain't Always Living"	Chris Keys; Quelle Chris	4:01
3.	"King in Black"	Quelle Chris	3:12
4.	"PS1 (Pontiac Sunfire 1)"	Chris Keys; Quelle Chris	0:48
5.	"Feed the Heads"	Quelle Chris	3:10
6.	"So Tired You Can't Stop Dreaming" (featuring Navy Blue)	Quelle Chris	3:41
7.	"Die Happy Knowing They'll Care"	Quelle Chris	1:50
8.	"Deathfame"	Quelle Chris	3:25
9.	"The Agency of the Future"	Quelle Chris	3:08
10.	"Help I'm Dead"	Quelle Chris	1:07
11.	"How Could You Love Something like Me?"	Chris Keys; Quelle Chris	3:20
12.	"CUI Prodest" (featuring Denmark Vessey and J Jig Cicero)	Quelle Chris	4:33
13.	"The Sky Is Blue Because the Sunset Is Red" (featuring MoRuf and Pink Siifu)	Chris Keys; Knxwledge	5:56
14.	"Excuse My Back" (featuring Cavalier)	Quelle Chris	3:05
Total length:			41:59

== Personnel ==
Credits adapted from liner notes.

- Gavin Christopher Tennille – main artist, producer (tracks: 1–12, 14), mixing
- Chris Keys – producer (tracks: 1, 2, 4, 11, 13)
- Glen Earl "Knxwledge" Boothe – producer (track 13)
- dane.zone – mastering
- Sage "Navy Blue" Elsesser – featured artist (track 6)
- Denmark Vessey – featured artist (track 12)
- J Jig Cicero – featured artist (track 12)
- MoRuf Adewunmi – featured artist (track 13)
- Livingston "Pink Siifu" Matthews – featured artist (track 13)
- Cavalier – featured artist (track 14)
