= Guns (Quelle Chris album) =

Studio album by Quelle Chris
- Released: March 29, 2019
- Genre: Hip-hop
- Length: 47:30
- Label: Mello Music Group
- Producer: Quelle Chris; Chris Keys; Dane

Quelle Chris chronology
| Everything's Fine (2018) | Guns (2019) | Innocent Country 2 (2020) |

Guns is a solo studio album by American rapper and record producer Quelle Chris. It was released on March 29, 2019, through Mello Music Group with distribution via The Orchard. Production was handled by Chris Keys, Dane, and Quelle himself. It features guest appearances from Bilal Salaam, Cavalier, Denmark Vessey, Eldar Djangirov, James Acaster, Jean Grae, Jonathan Hoard, Mach-Hommy, and Ugly Boy Modeling.

== Critical reception ==
Professional ratings
Aggregate scores
| Source | Rating |
|---|---|
| Metacritic | 81/100 |
Review scores
| Source | Rating |
| AllMusic | 4/5 stars |
| Exclaim! | 7/10 |
| HipHopDX | 4/5 |
| Pitchfork | 7.7/10 |
| Vice | A− |

At Metacritic, which assigns a weighted average score out of 100 to reviews from mainstream critics, the album received an average score of 81, based on 4 reviews, indicating "universal acclaim".

Paul Simpson of AllMusic gave the album 4 stars out of 5, calling it Quelle Chris' "best, most enjoyable work." Kyle Mullin of Exclaim! gave the album a 7 out of 10, writing, "While this is an album with no shortage of ambition, and one that will certainly make demands on its listeners, their patience will certainly be rewarded by the multitudes that Quelle brings forth on Guns."

== Track listing ==
| No. | Title | Producer(s) | Length |
|---|---|---|---|
| 1. | "Spray and Pray" | Dane | 1:38 |
| 2. | "Guns" | Chris Keys | 3:12 |
| 3. | "Color of the Day" | Quelle Chris | 0:25 |
| 4. | "Mind Ya Bidness" | Quelle Chris | 3:35 |
| 5. | "It's the Law/Farewell Goodbye Addio, Uncle Tom" (featuring Ugly Boy Modeling) | Quelle Chris | 4:33 |
| 6. | "Wild Minks" (featuring Mach-Hommy) | Quelle Chris | 4:51 |
| 7. | "Box of Wheaties V2" (featuring Denmark Vessey) | Quelle Chris | 5:14 |
| 8. | "PSA Drugfest 2003/Sleeveless Minks" | Quelle Chris | 4:28 |
| 9. | "Sunday Mass" (featuring Bilal Salaam) | Quelle Chris | 0:52 |
| 10. | "Straight Shot" (featuring Cavalier, Bilal Salaam, Eldar Djangirov, and James Acaster) | Quelle Chris; Chris Keys (co.) | 6:10 |
| 11. | "Obamacare" | Quelle Chris; Chris Keys (co.) | 4:27 |
| 12. | "You, Me & Nobody Else" (featuring Jean Grae and Jonathan Hoard) | Quelle Chris | 4:47 |
| 13. | "WYRM" | Quelle Chris | 3:19 |
| Total length: | | | 47:30 |

== Personnel ==
Credits adapted from liner notes.

- Gavin Christopher Tennille – main artist, producer (3–13), artwork, layout
- Bilal Salaam – featured artist (9, 10), additional vocals (1)
- Tsidi Ibrahim – featured artist (12), additional vocals (2)
- Ugly Boy Modeling – featured artist (5)
- Mach-Hommy – featured artist (6)
- Denmark Vessey – featured artist (7)
- Maurese – additional vocals (7)
- Ronnie "Hands" Palmolive – additional vocals (7)
- Shaka King – additional vocals (7)
- Cavalier – featured artist (10), layout
- Eldar Djangirov – featured artist, piano (10)
- James Acaster – featured artist, additional vocals (10)
- Jonathan Hoard – featured artist (12)
- Dane – additional guitar (7), bass guitar and mixing (12), producer (1)
- Chris Keys – keyboards (10), additional keyboards (11), producer (2), co-producer (10, 11)
- Paul "Bae Bro" Wilson – keyboards and organ (12), mixing, mastering
- Daoud – piano (12)
