= Cavalry (disambiguation) =

Cavalry are soldiers who fight while mounted on horses.

Cavalry may also refer to:

- Cavalry (1936 American film), a 1936 American film directed by Robert N. Bradbury
- Cavalry (1936 Italian film), a 1936 Italian film starring Amadeo Nazzari
- Cavalry: Its History and Tactics, an 1860 book by Lewis Edward Nolan
- Cavalry: Its History, Management, and Uses in War, an 1863 book by Jean Roemer
- Cavalry (comics), a Marvel comics superhero team
- Cavalry FC, a soccer club from Calgary in the Canadian Premier League
- "The Cavalry" (Motherland), a 2017 television episode

== See also ==
- Cavalry Division (disambiguation)
- Cavalier (disambiguation)
- Light cavalry
- Heavy cavalry
