= Cavalier (disambiguation) =

A cavalier was a supporter of the Royalist cause during the Wars of the Three Kingdoms.

Cavalier or Cavelier may also refer to:

== History ==
- Virginia Cavaliers (historical)
- Cavalier myth
- Cavalier (fortification)

== Corporations ==
- Cavalier Chocolate, a Belgian chocolatier
- Cavalier Records, a defunct American record label
- Cavalier Telephone and TV a, U.S. internet and telephone company

== Dance ==
- Cavalier, a principal male role in The Nutcracker ballet
- Cavalier, or kavalyé, a dancer in the Dominican folk dance bélé

== People ==
- Alain Cavalier (born 1931), French film director
- Jean Cavalier (1681–1740), Huguenot guerilla leader during the War of the Camisards
- Marie Cavallier (born 1976), second wife of Prince Joachim of Denmark
- Nita Cavalier (1906–1969), American silent film and stage actress
- René-Robert Cavelier, Sieur de La Salle (1643–1687), French explorer best known as "La Salle"
- Cavalier, American rapper who released Different Type Time (2024)
- Cavalier Johnson (born 1986), American politician
- Cavelier Petit, American politician
- Dorothy Cavalier Yanik (1928–2015), American visual artist and educator
- J. M. A. Cavelier de Cuverville (1834–1912), a vice admiral of the French Navy after whom Cuverville Island is named

== Places ==
- Cavalier, North Dakota, a city
- Cavalier County, North Dakota, a county
- Cavalier Space Force Station, a United States Air Force installation in North Dakota
- Cavalier Tower, a tower in Qrendi, Malta

== Publications ==
- Cavalier (character), a DC Comics supervillain, a minor enemy of Batman
- Cavalier (Dungeons & Dragons), a warrior designation available to players of Dungeons & Dragons
- Cavalier (magazine), a Fawcett Publications men's magazine
- Cavalier (Nedor Comics), a Nedor Comics superhero from the Golden Age of Comics
- Cavaliers and Roundheads, a set of rules for English Civil War miniature wargaming
- The Scrap Book and The Cavalier, American pulp magazines published between 1906 and 1914

== Sports teams ==
- Cleveland Cavaliers, a professional basketball team in the United States
- Virginia Cavaliers, any of the University of Virginia's athletic teams
- UVA Wise Cavaliers, any athletic teams of the University of Virginia's College at Wise
- New Zealand Cavaliers, the unofficial New Zealand rugby team which toured South Africa in 1986
- The Cavaliers Drum and Bugle Corps, a modern drum and bugle corps from Rosemont, Illinois
- Cavalier F.C., a Jamaican football team
- Cavalier FC, a Bahamian football team
- Walsh Cavaliers, any of Walsh University's athletic teams

== Transportation ==
- Cavalier flying boat, lost in 1939
- Cavalier Mustang, a civilian-modified version of the North American P-51 Mustang aircraft
- The Cavalier range of yachts produced by Cavalier Yachts in New Zealand
- Chevrolet Cavalier, automobile in the US
- Packard Cavalier, a luxury automobile made in the US
- Vauxhall Cavalier, automobile in the UK
- AMC Cavalier, a symmetrical show car with interchangeable body panels
- Mk VII Cavalier tank, a British cruiser tank during World War II
- Cavalier (N&W train), operated by the Norfolk and Western Railway between Chicago and Norfolk
- Cavalier (Canadian train), operated by Canadian National Railway and Via Rail Canada between Montreal and Toronto
- Cavalier (PRR train), operated by the Pennsylvania Railroad between New York and Cape Charles, Virginia
- MacFam Cavalier, a homebuilt aircraft design
- Cavalier, the aircraft of the 1939 Imperial Airways flying boat ditching

== Other ==
- Cavalier (album), a 2007 album by Tom Brosseau
- The Cavalier (film), a 1928 western
- Cavalier (grape), another name for the white French wine grape Len de l'El
- Cavalier (playing card)
- Cavalier perspective, an oblique projection (a way to represent a three-dimensional object on a flat drawing)
- Cavalier King Charles Spaniel, a British breed of toy dog of spaniel type
- Hilltop Manor (The Cavalier Apartment Building), a historic building in Washington, D.C., known as The Cavalier
- The Popinjay Cavalier, an upcoming play by Quentin Tarantino

== See also ==
- Cavalry (disambiguation)
- Cavalryman
- Paladin, in some contexts
- Knight
