= Tanya Morgan =

American hip-hop group

- Origin: Cincinnati, Ohio; Brooklyn, New York
- Genre: Hip-hop
- Years active: 2003–present
- Labels: Loud Minority Music; Interdependent Media; HiPNOTT Records; Imprint 180
- Members: Devon "Von Pea" Callender; William Donald "Donwill" Freeman
- Past members: Ilyas Shakir Nasheed

Tanya Morgan is an American hip-hop group, which consists of MC William Donald "Donwill" Freeman and MC/producer Devon "Von Pea" Callender. Donwill is from Cincinnati, Ohio, while Von Pea is from Brooklyn, New York. Their fourth studio album, YGWY$4, was released on July 28, 2017.

== History ==
Tanya Morgan was founded in 2003. Von Pea and Donwill, already regular collaborators after having met on the okayplayer.com message board, decided to work on a full-length album together. Ilyas Shakir Nasheed, who along with Donwill comprised a hip-hop duo known as Ilwill, joined the project as a third member, and producer Brick Beats was brought in to work on the album as well. Since Von Pea lived in Brooklyn and both Donwill and Ilyas lived in Cincinnati, the trio did much of the work on their first album by exchanging files across AOL Instant Messenger.

Prior to releasing their debut album Moonlighting, Tanya Morgan released an online mixtape, Sunlighting, and an EP of original material, Sunset. After Tanya Morgan was featured in XXL Magazine's "Show and Prove" column, Moonlighting was released on Loud Minority Music. The album received 3.5 mics (out of 5) in The Source magazine, an entry in the Chairman's Choice column in XXL, and coverage in Wax Poetics magazine and several other publications and websites.

The group released the first MySpace-themed video for their single "We Be", and it went on to win MTVu's Freshman of the Week contest in July 2006. The "We Be" video was resultantly aired on channels such as MTV Jams, Much Music and WNYE-TV's The Bridge.

Tanya Morgan has collaborated with hip-hop acts such as Nicolay, Fat Jon, 88-Keys and Drake. The group performed at Toronto's NXNE Festival with Nouveau Riche, and the Brooklyn Hip Hop Festival with Ghostface Killah, Large Professor, Consequence, and others. Tanya Morgan is also a regular at New York's annual CMJ Festival.

Tanya Morgan was voted the winner of the "Show Us What You Got" Hip-Hop Artist Competition, held on October 25, 2007 at the Power Summit in Las Vegas, Nevada. They were also featured in XXL's "Chairman's Choice" in September 2008, and named in XXLMag.com's Top Ten Artists in July of the same year. 2008 also saw the release of their EP The Bridge.

In 2009 Tanya Morgan recorded Brooklynati, an album and coinciding multi-media project that was released May 12, 2009 on Interdependent Media. The album was produced by Brick Beats and Von Pea and included vocals by Carlitta Durand, Napoleon, Peter Hadar and Phonte, with guest appearances from Jermiside, Che Grand and Blu, among others. The music was paired with a multimedia campaign based on the fictitious city "Brooklynati", which combined elements from both Cincinnati, Ohio and Brooklyn, New York.

After Brooklynati, the group reformed with Ilyas moving on to focus on his solo material and video production while Von Pea and Donwill continue to tour as Tanya Morgan, supporting the group's new and classic material as well as Donwill's and Von Pea's own solo releases.

The Sandwich Shop was released in 2010 as a side project in which Von Pea and Donwill put vocals over The Roots' Sandwiches EP. In late 2011 the duo put out a 9-track EP entitled You & What Army.

In 2013, Tanya Morgan released their third studio album, Rubber Souls, which was produced entirely by 6th Sense. In 2016, Tanya Morgan reunited with one-time member Ilyas for their collective Lessondary album Ahead of Schedule. The group released fourth album YGWY$4 in July 2017, and later in the year composed the music for the podcast Thirst Aid Kit.

== Discography ==
=== Albums ===
- Moonlighting (2006)
- Brooklynati (2009)
- Rubber Souls (2013)
- Ahead of Schedule (2016) (with Rob Cave Spec Boogie, Che Grand, Jermiside, Elucid, Aeon, Brickbeats as Lessondary)
- YGWY$4 (2017)
- Don & Von (2021)

=== Mixtapes ===
- Sunlighting (2007)
- Tanya Morgan Is a Rap Group (2008)

=== EPs ===
- Sunset (2005)
- The Bridge (2008)
- The Sandwich Shop (2010)
- You & What Army (2011)
- 12 Minutes at Karriem's (2015)
- Abandoned Theme Park (2016)

=== Singles ===
- "Take the L" (2006)
- "We Be" (2006)
- "So Damn Down" (2009)
- "Bang & Boogie" (2009)
- "Whatever That's Mine" (2011)
- "Rock The Bells" (2011)
- "Never Too Much" (2013)
- "Eulogy" (2014)
- "The Vehicle" (2014)
- "Stoops" (2016)

=== Guest appearances ===
- Symbolyc One – "Everybody Clap" (feat. Lifesavas) from Music Box (2008)
- Fresh Daily – "Me First" from The Gorgeous Killer: In Crimes Of Passion (2009)
- 9th Wonder – "Streets Of Music" (feat. Enigma) from The Wonder Years (2011)
- Quelle Chris – "Greene Eyes" (feat. Fresh Daily) from Too Dirt For TV^{2}: Niggas Is Men (2013)
- The Other Guys – "Blow My Mind" from Seeds Of Ambition (2014)
- J-Live – "City To City" from Around The Sun (2014)
- GUTS – "Go For Mine" from Hip Hop After All (2014)
- Red Cardell & Bagad Kemper – "125th" from Gwenn-ha-Du (2014)
- Denmark Vessey – "Dr. Martin Lucid Dream" from Martin Lucid Dream (2015)
- GUTS – "Take Me Back", "All Or Nothing", "Rest Of My Life", "Kiss My Converse" from Eternal (2016)
- The Other Guys – "Friends Old & New" from Life In Analog (2016)
- Danny! - "Even Louder" (feat. Swizz Beatz) from Payback (album) (2017)
