= Innocent Country 2 =

Studio album by Quelle Chris and Chris Keys
- Released: April 24, 2020
- Genre: Alternative hip-hop
- Length: 63:59
- Label: Mello Music Group
- Producer: Chris Keys; Quelle Chris (co.)

Quelle Chris and Chris Keys chronology
Innocent Country (2015)	Innocent Country 2 (2020)

Quelle Chris chronology
Guns (2019)	Innocent Country 2 (2020)	Deathfame (2022)

Innocent Country 2 is the second collaborative studio album by American rapper Quelle Chris and record producer Chris Keys. It was released on April 24, 2020 via Mello Music Group, serving as a sequel to their 2015 album Innocent Country and the fourth in the Quelle's 2Dirt4TV series. It features guest appearances from Merrill Garbus, Cavalier, Denmark Vessey, Earl Sweatshirt, Homeboy Sandman, and comedians Josh Gondelman and James Acaster, among others.

== Critical reception ==
Professional ratings
Review scores
Source	Rating
AllMusic	3.5/5 stars
HipHopDX	4.1/5
Pitchfork	7.3/10
The Needle Drop	8/10
Tom Hull	B+

Paul Simpson of AllMusic gave the album 3.5 stars out of 5, commenting that "Keys' productions are generally clean and polished, filled with jazzy pianos and warm rhythms rather than the more disjointed sample-choppery of before" and that "Quelle's rhymes focus on maintaining sanity and happiness throughout all of life's obstacles, and while these are easily his most mature lyrics to date, he still injects the album with plenty of satire and surrealism."

On June 29, 2020, NPR Music included it on the "25 Favorite Albums of 2020 (So Far)" list.

== Track listing ==
All tracks are written by Gavin Christopher Tennille, except where noted.

No.	Title	Writer(s)	Length
1.	"Intro / ReCAP"		2:42
2.	"Outro / Honest" (featuring Marcella Arguela)	Tennille; Marcella	4:43
3.	"Living Happy" (featuring Joseph Chilliams and Cavalier)	Tennille; Chilliams; Cavalier	4:29
4.	"Sacred Safe" (featuring Merrill Garbus, Cavalier, and Homeboy Sandman)	Tennille; Garbus; Cavalier; Angel Villar II	5:27
5.	"Horizon"		2:35
6.	"Moments" (featuring Josh Gondelman)	Gondelman	0:41
7.	"Bottle Black Power Buy the Business"		2:53
8.	"Grease from the Elbows" (featuring Pink Siifu and Billy Woods)	Tennille; Siifu; Woods	4:22
9.	"Black Twitter" (featuring MosEL and Nelson Bandela)		5:19
10.	"Ritual" (featuring Dr. Tennille)		2:01
11.	"Sudden Death"		3:41
12.	"Make It Better" (featuring Starr Busby)		5:30
13.	"Graphic Bleed Outs" (featuring Merrill Garbus and Melanie St. Charles)		4:35
14.	"Mirage" (featuring Earl Sweatshirt, Denmark Vessey, Merrill Garbus, and Big Sen)	Tennille; Thebe Kgositsile; Vessey; Garbus	7:07
15.	"When You Fall..." (featuring Nappy Nina, Fresh Daily, and 5ILL)		6:56
16.	"FIFOALSA / Credits"		0:49
Total length:			63:59

== Personnel ==
Credits adapted from liner notes.

- Quelle Chris – main artist, co-producer, mixing, artwork
- Chris Keys – main artist, producer, mixing
- Dane Orr – mixing, mastering
- Skor Rokswell – artwork
- Cavalier – artwork, featured artist (3, 4)
- Ahmed Arasah – artwork
- Marcella Arguela – featured artist (2)
- Joseph Chilliams – featured artist (3)
- Merrill Garbus – featured artist (4, 13, 14)
- Homeboy Sandman – featured artist (4)
- Josh Gondelman – featured artist (6)
- Pink Siifu – featured artist (8)
- Billy Woods – featured artist (8)
- MosEL – featured artist (9)
- Nelson Bandela – featured artist (9)
- Dr. Tennille – featured artist (10)
- Starr Busby – featured artist (12)
- Melanie St. Charles – featured artist (13)
- Earl Sweatshirt – featured artist (14)
- Denmark Vessey – featured artist (14)
- Big Sen – featured artist (14)
- Nappy Nina – featured artist (15)
- Fresh Daily – featured artist (15)
- 5ILL – featured artist (15)
