= Ghost at the Finish Line =

Studio album by Quelle Chris
- Released: October 29, 2013
- Genre: Hip-hop
- Length: 39:40
- Label: Mello Music Group
- Producer: Michael Tolle (exec.); Quelle Chris; Chris Keys; Oh No; Denmark Vessey; Knxwledge; Xxxxxxx

Quelle Chris chronology
| Niggas Is Men (2013) | Ghost at the Finish Line (2013) | Innocent Country (2015) |

Ghost at the Finish Line is a solo studio album by American rapper Quelle Chris. It was released via Mello Music Group on October 29, 2013. The thirteen-track record featured guest appearances by the likes of Alchemist, Black Milk, Denmark Vessey, Fuzz Scoota, Guilty Simpson, House Shoes, Jimetta Rose, Marv Won, and Mosel.

== Critical reception ==
Professional ratings
Review scores
| Source | Rating |
|---|---|
| Consequence of Sound | C− |
| HipHopDX | 4.0/5 |

Jesse Fairfax of HipHopDX gave the album a 4.0 out of 5, writing, "The album best functions as a sobering look at an underdog determined to win on his own terms, its minimalist aspects reflecting the human struggle to elevate on both personal and professional levels."

== Track listing ==
| No. | Title | Producer(s) | Length |
|---|---|---|---|
| 1. | "You'll Be Your Star" (featuring Jimetta Rose) | Chris Keys | 1:45 |
| 2. | "Loop Dreams" | Chris Keys | 3:21 |
| 3. | "What Up" | Oh No | 3:13 |
| 4. | "Wait a Minute" (featuring Denmark Vessey) | Quelle Chris | 3:45 |
| 5. | "Super Fuck" | Quelle Chris | 2:43 |
| 6. | "PRX" (featuring Alchemist and Guilty Simpson) | Quelle Chris | 3:36 |
| 7. | "King Is Dead" | Quelle Chris | 3:19 |
| 8. | "Undying" | Denmark Vessey | 2:44 |
| 9. | "Coke Rap War Game" (featuring Black Milk and Denmark Vessey) | Quelle Chris | 3:01 |
| 10. | "With Open Arms" (featuring MarvWon, Fuzz Scoota, and House Shoes) | Oh No | 3:54 |
| 11. | "Look at Shorty" | Knxwledge | 3:02 |
| 12. | "Life Beyond" (featuring Mosel) | XXXXXXX | 2:31 |
| 13. | "Ghost at the Finish Line" | Quelle Chris | 2:46 |
| Total length: | | | 39:40 |
