= The Cavaliers =

The Cavaliers may refer to:

- The Cavaliers Drum and Bugle Corps
- J. Frank Wilson and the Cavaliers
- The Sensations, a group initially known as The Cavaliers
- Cleveland Cavaliers, an NBA Basketball Team

== See also ==
- Cavalier, a supporter of the Royalist cause during the Wars of the Three Kingdoms
- Cavalier (disambiguation)
