= Madras Light Cavalry =

Madras Light Cavalry may refer to:

- 1st Madras Light Cavalry or 8th King George's Own Light Cavalry
- 2nd Madras Light Cavalry, or 16th Light Cavalry
- 3rd Madras Light Cavalry, 7th Light Cavalry
- 4th Madras Light Cavalry; see Madras Army
- 5th Madras Light Cavalry; see Madras Army
- 6th Madras Light Cavalry; see Madras Army
- 7th Madras Light Cavalry; see Madras Army
- 8th Madras Light Cavalry; see Madras Army

== See also ==
- Madras (disambiguation)
- Cavalry (disambiguation)
- Madras Army
- Light cavalry
