= Niggas Is Men =

Mixtape by Quelle Chris
- Released: March 19, 2013
- Genre: Hip-hop
- Length: 45:48
- Label: Mello Music Group
- Producer: Michael Tolle (exec.); Quelle Chris (also exec.); Messiah Musik; Sifu

Quelle Chris chronology
2Dirt4TV (2012)	Niggas Is Men (2013)	Ghost at the Finish Line (2015)

Too Dirt for TV^{2} – Niggas Is Men is a 2013 mixtape album by American rapper and producer Quelle Chris. It featured audio production handled by Messiah Musik, Sifu and Quelle himself, and guest appearances from Bwameeks, Cavalier, Chay, Denmark Vessey, DJ GroWeyez, Fresh Daily, Mosel, and Tanya Morgan.

== Background ==
Professional ratings
Review scores
Source	Rating
RapReviews	6/10 stars

Niggas Is Men is Quelle's debut full-length with Tucson, Arizona-based independent label Mello Music Group. Also it is the second album of Quelle's ongoing 'too dirt for TV' series, following up to his 2012 release of 2Dirt4TV and preceding his 2015 release of Innocent Country.

The record was released on March 19, 2013 for sale digitally, and on April 30, 2013 on CD and vinyl, and distributed by Fat Beats.

== Track listing ==
No.	Title	Producer(s)	Length
1.	"Try to Get Over" (featuring DJ GroWeyez)	Quelle Chris	1:31
2.	"Long Tokes" (featuring Cavalier)	Messiah Musik	3:17
3.	"We Eat It" (featuring Cavalier)	Quelle Chris	3:18
4.	"Natural Flavors" (featuring Cavalier & Bwameeks)	Quelle Chris	4:10
5.	"Hot N Crusty" (featuring Cavalier, Fresh Daily & Chay)	Sifu	4:01
6.	"Greene Eyes" (featuring Tanya Morgan, Cavalier & Fresh Daily)	Messiah Musik	4:22
7.	"Good Days" (featuring Denmark Vessey, Fresh Daily & Cavalier)	Quelle Chris	5:06
8.	"Addiction Cycles" (featuring Cavalier)	Messiah Musik	5:12
9.	"In Retrograde"	Messiah Musik	3:00
10.	"Old Friend" (featuring Cavalier)	Messiah Musik	4:29
11.	"Aura" (featuring Mosel & Cavalier)	Quelle Chris	3:58
12.	"Are You Ready"	Quelle Chris	0:48
13.	"G.I. Soul" (featuring Cavalier)	Sifu	2:35
Total length:			45:48

Bonus track
No.	Title	Producer(s)	Length
14.	"We Eat It REMIX" (featuring P.U.D.G.E. & Chris Keys)	Quelle Chris	4:12

Notes

- "Green Eyes" contains samples from "Soul Girl" by Ahmad Jamal (1973) and "Treat 'Em Right" by Chubb Rock (1990)
- "In Retrograde" contains samples from "Spell" by Blue Magic (1974)

== Personnel ==
- André Trenier – artwork
- Chris Keys – guest vocals (track 14)
- Denmark Vessey – guest vocals (track 7)
- Devon Callender – guest vocals (track 6)
- Donald Freeman – guest vocals (track 6)
- Gavin Christopher Tennille – main artist, executive producer, producer (tracks 1, 3–4, 7, 9, 11–12, 14)
- Ilyas Nashid – guest vocals (track 6)
- Michael Richardson – guest vocals (tracks 5–7)
- Michael Tolle – executive producer
- Bwameeks – guest vocals (track 4)
- Cavalier – guest vocals (tracks 2–8, 10–11, 13)
- Chay – guest vocals (track 5)
- DJ Groweyez – guest vocals (track 1)
- Messiah Musik – producer (tracks 2, 6, 8–10)
- Mosel – guest vocals (track 11)
- P.U.D.G.E. - guest vocals (track 14)
- Sifu – producer (tracks 5, 13)
