= Sun Go Nova =

EP by Denmark Vessey
- Released: April 20, 2018
- Recorded: 2017
- Genres: Conscious hip-hop; underground hip-hop; instrumental hip-hop
- Length: 27:12
- Label: Mello Music Group
- Producers: Michael Tolle (exec.); Denmark Vessey; Earl Sweatshirt; Knxwledge

Denmark Vessey chronology
Buy Muy Drugs (2017)	Sun Go Nova (2018)

Singles from Sun Go Nova
- 1. "Sun Go Nova" Released: February 22, 2018; 2. "Trustfall" Released: March 21, 2018; 3. "Sellout" Released: April 5, 2018

Professional ratings
Review scores
Source	Rating
Pitchfork	6.4/10

Sun Go Nova is the third solo extended play (EP) by American rapper and producer Denmark Vessey. It was released on April 20, 2018 via Mello Music Group. The EP is supported by three singles: "Sun Go Nova", "Trustfall" and "Sellout".

== Background ==
The instrumental for the track "Sellout" was originally produced for Vince Staples by Earl Sweatshirt in 2013. It was featured in the 2014 mini documentary Earl Sweatshirt and Vince Staples - Inside the Beat - Ep. 1.

== Track listing ==
Vol. 1: Sun Go Nova EP
No.	Title	Producer	Length
1.	"Zzzzzz" (featuring ADaD)	Earl Sweatshirt	4:11
2.	"Trustfall"	Earl Sweatshirt	2:47
3.	"Stolat"	Knxwledge	3:51
4.	"Sun Go Nova"	Knxwledge	3:06
5.	"Sellout" (featuring DrxQuinnx and Vic Spencer)	Earl Sweatshirt	5:00
Total length:			18:15

Vol. 2: Sun Go Nova Beat Tape
No.	Title	Producer	Length
6.	"Sunrise (Intro)"	Denmark Vessey	0:45
7.	"Morning"	Vessey	0:25
8.	"Halal Avocado Toast"	Vessey	2:12
9.	"High Noon Titan"	Vessey	1:27
10.	"Rush Hour"	Vessey	1:32
11.	"Primetime"	Vessey	0:37
12.	"Quiet Storm Jam"	Vessey	1:21
13.	"Wax Wane Tears"	Vessey	1:06
14.	"Tomorrow Again"	Vessey	0:52
Total length:			8:57
