= Heavy cavalry =

Cavalry with strong armor, horses, and weaponry

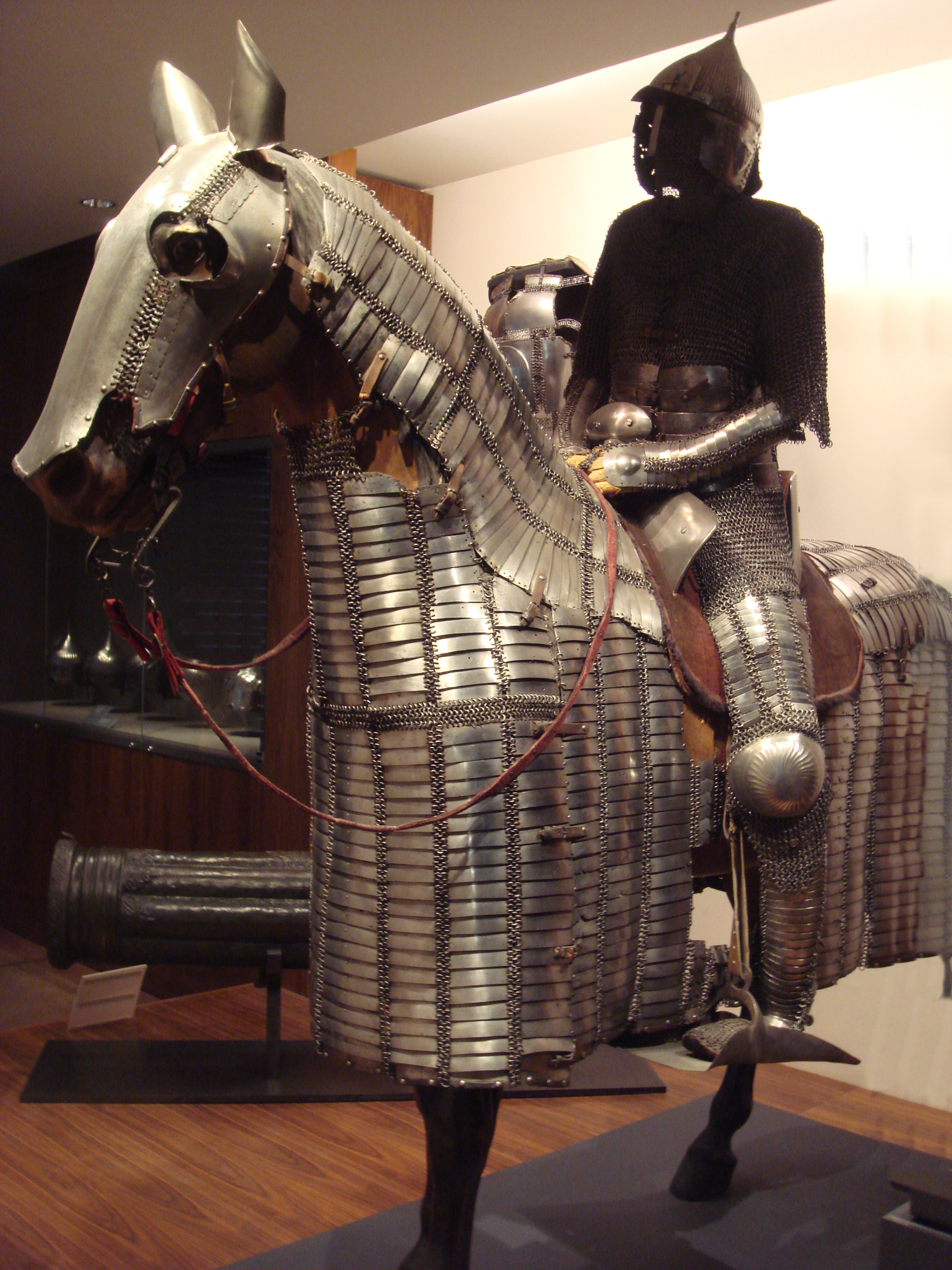
Ottoman Sipahi heavy cavalry, c. 1550

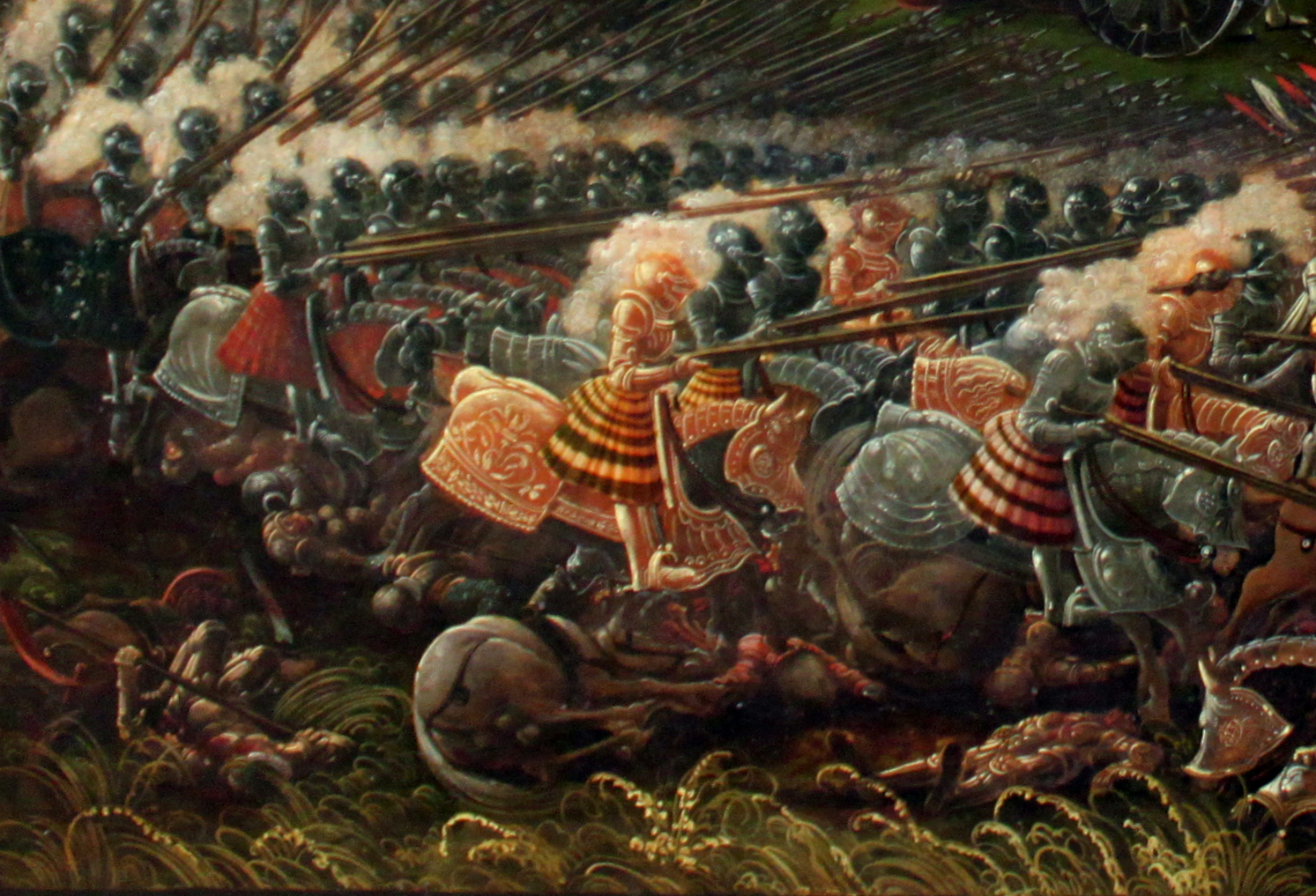
Early 16th-century French gendarmes, with complete plate armour and heavy lances

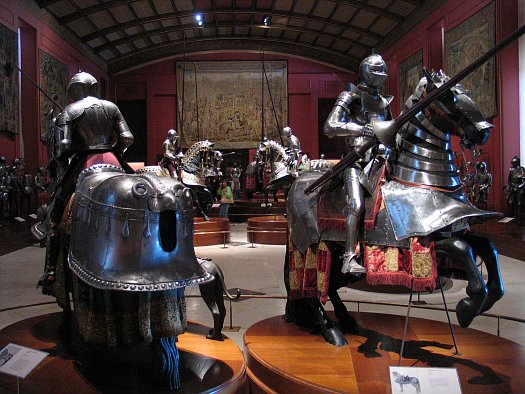
Spanish Heavy Cavalry – Royal Armoury of Madrid, Spain

Heavy cavalry was a class of cavalry intended to deliver a battlefield charge and also to act as a tactical reserve; they are also often termed shock cavalry. Although their equipment differed greatly depending on the region and historical period, heavy cavalry were generally mounted on large powerful warhorses, wore body armor, and armed with either lances, swords, maces, flails (disputed), battle axes, or war hammers; their mounts may also have been protected by barding. They were distinct from light cavalry, who were intended for raiding, reconnaissance, screening, skirmishing, patrolling, and tactical communications.

== History ==
=== Persian Empires ===
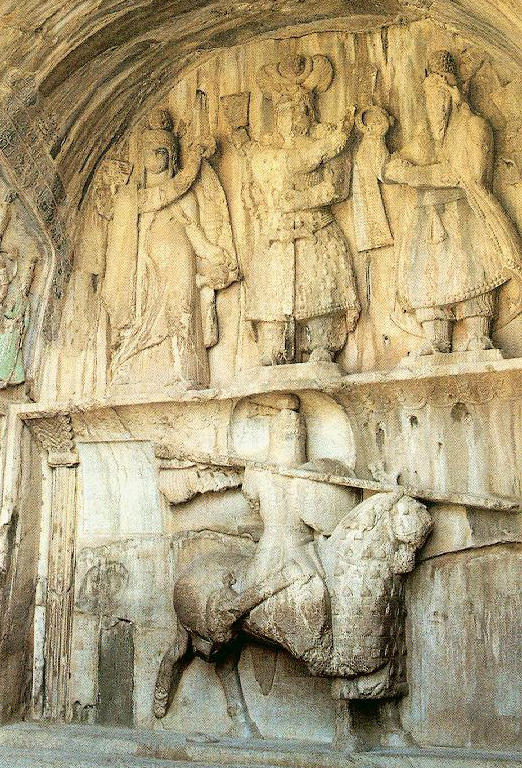
The oldest known relief of a heavily armoured cavalryman, from the Sasanian Empire, at Taq-i Bostan, near Kermanshah, Iran (7th century)

Iranian tribes such as the Massagetae were believed to be the originator of the class of heavy cavalry known as cataphract. During the time of Achaemenid Persia cavalry was the elite arm of service (as was the case in most civilizations), and many Persian horsemen such as the bodyguard unit of Cyrus the Younger were rather heavily armoured by the standards of the era. By the time of Alexander's invasion cataphract units with both men and beasts being fully encased in armour were already in use by the Persians.

The Parthian Empire of Ancient Iran marks an early recorded utilization of armoured cavalry in warfare, and are specifically believed to have given rise to the tradition of very heavily armoured cataphract lancers. These had a distinct role from ordinary heavy cavalry and were primarily used as an elite assault force, to pummel infantry formations into submission, or even acted in a dual-purpose role as horse archers and cataphracts.

Ammianus Marcellinus, a Roman general and historian who served in the army of Constantius II in Gaul and Persia, fought against the Persians under Julian the Apostate and took part in the retreat of his successor, Jovian. He describes the Persian cataphract as:

All their companies clad in iron, and all parts of their bodies were covered with thick plates, so fitted that the stiff joints conformed with those of their limbs; and forms of the human faces were so skillfully fitted to their heads, that since their entire bodies were covered with metal, arrows that fell upon them could lodge only where they could see a little through tiny openings opposite the pupil of the eye, or where through the tips of their noses they were able to get a little breath. The Persians opposed us serried bands of mail-clad horsemen in such close order that the gleam of moving bodies covered with closely fitting plates of iron dazzled the eyes of those who looked upon them, while the whole throng of horses was protected by coverings of leather.

=== Celts ===
The Celts of western and central Europe are among the first peoples in the region known to have made use of heavy cavalry. It is generally accepted that the Celts were the originators of mail armour, the earliest find being from a Celtic burial in Ciumesti in modern-day Romania. Mail and occasionally bronze armour were restricted generally to the nobility and chieftains of Celtic society, and the additional cost of maintaining a horse trained for the din and chaos of battle ensured that those men who could afford a full panoply of mail and a good quality warhorse were highly motivated, not merely by their status but by the emphasis that Celtic society placed on personal success and courage. At the Battle of Carrhae, Gallic auxiliary cavalry met with the completely armoured Parthian cataphracts. Despite being outmatched the Gauls fought fiercely and well before being annihilated in a protracted melee.

The small size of Celtic horses meant that the Celtic heavy cavalry of north-western and central Europe appear to have been employed as heavy skirmisher cavalry, rather than the shock cavalry of the Middle East and North Africa, the heavy cavalry of Gaul and Celtiberia being widely regarded as some of the finest horsemen of the ancient world. The Gauls were known to be able to hurl their javelins while retreating, and to use a system whereby a cavalryman was supported by two other men with fresh horses who could resupply him with missiles. For close combat the main weapon was the spear, around 7 feet (2.1 m) in length with a leaf-bladed head, and a heavy wooden shield with an iron spindle-type boss. The most prestigious weapon was the sword, a blade ranging anywhere from 2 to 3 feet (0.61 to 0.91 m) in length. Celtic swords were typically of good quality, with some being of such quality that archeologists have classed them as being equal to modern, high-quality steel replicas.

The heavy cavalry of the Celtiberi, widely employed by the Carthaginians, included men who may have ridden on mail-armoured horses. Known to the Romans as "Lanciarii" (not to be confused with the spear-armed infantry of the Eastern Roman Empire), they are represented in several Iberian carvings of the period. They may have carried the "soliferrum", the all-iron javelin unique to Iberia, in addition to a spear and shield and a Celtic-style longsword or an Iberian falcata. Together with the Gallic nobles, it was likely these horsemen who at the Battle of Cannae charged and then broke the Roman and Italian cavalry.

=== Greeks ===
The ancient Greeks called armoured cavalry Kataphraktos (pl. Kataphraktoi) which translated means roughly "covered, protected" or "armoured". The term was later borrowed by the Romans (the Latin variant in the Roman Empire being Cataphractarii) and until the Middle Ages in Europe, continued to be used to designate armoured cavalry. However, as with other types of cavalry, heavy cavalry was not employed in any significant capacity in wars between the Greek city states until later, mainly due to the prevalence of hoplite warfare as well as the mountainous terrain of Central Greece. The lack of suitable grassland and excess grain supply necessary for the production of good cavalry mounts was also crippling to the establishment of an effective cavalry force, the noted Greek mercenary and writer Xenophon once saying that a horse farm was the most expensive type of establishment to keep running.

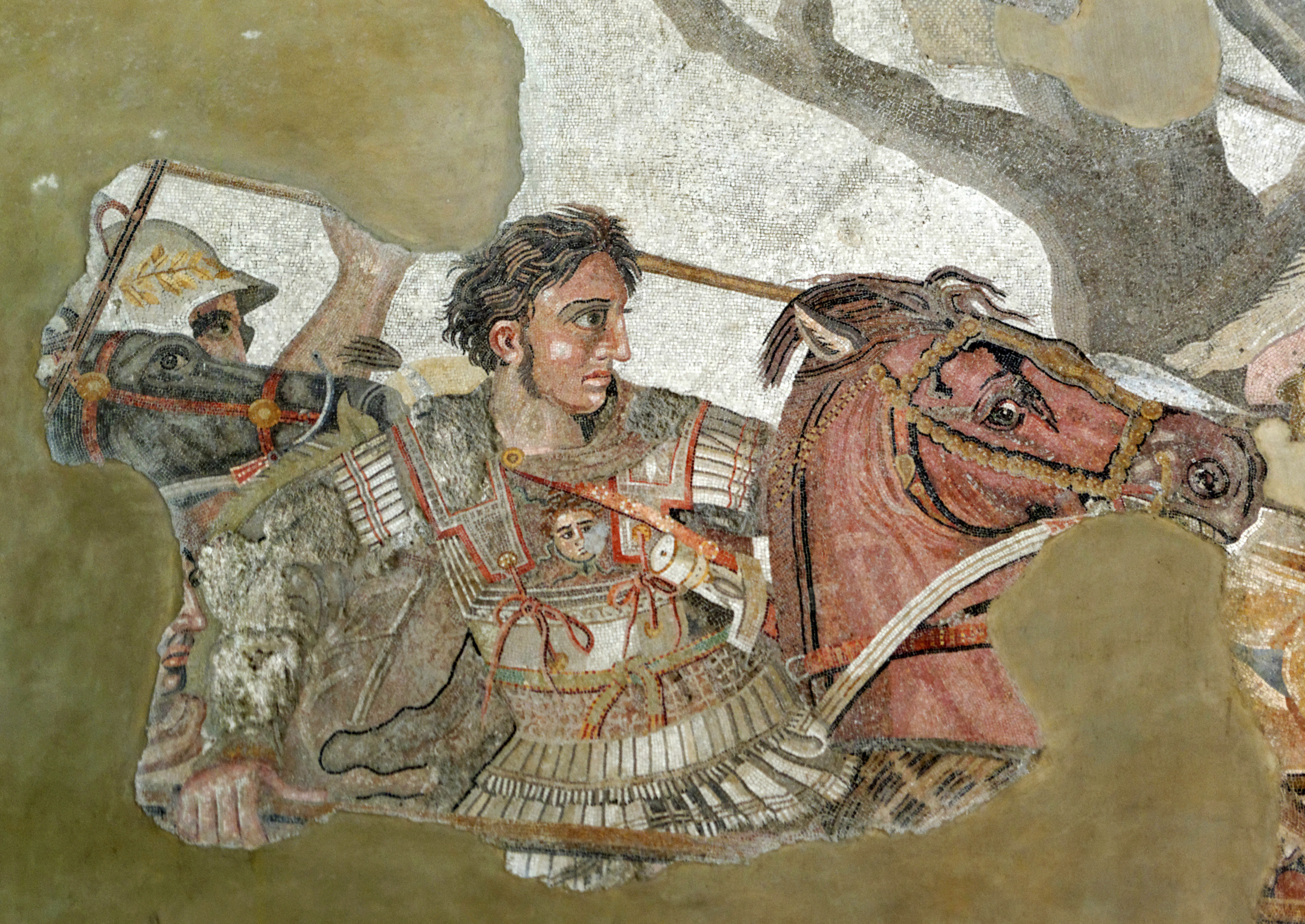
Alexander the Great on horseback

The exception was in Northern Greece, where large flat areas of grassland made cavalry much more practical. Eventually, encounters with Persian cavalry led the Greeks to create their own cavalry arm, the Hippeis, composed mostly of upper-class citizens who could afford to maintain a horse. While cavalry played an increasingly greater part in Greek warfare, its roles were generally restricted to scouting, skirmishing and pursuit. However, by the end of the Peloponnesian War, heavy cavalry charges had started to play an increasingly important part in Ancient Greek warfare, with the Battle of Delium showing how their intervention could turn the tide of a battle. The city-state of Thebes was particularly famous for its cavalry, with the famed Theban commander Epaminondas using his heavy horse to great effect both at Leuctra as well as Mantineia to rout the Spartan cavalry, and in the process disrupting the legendary Spartan phalanx as well, helping his own hoplites win the battle.

The development of the saddle as well as increasingly larger horse breeds led to creation of the Macedonian Companion cavalry developed during the reign of Philip II of Macedon, likely based on the Theban model, as he had spent his youth in the house of Epaminondas as a hostage. This force was later used with great effect by his son, Alexander the Great. In both role and equipment, the Companions was the first cavalry force that was known to represent archetypal heavy cavalry. The Companion cavalry, or Hetairoi, were the elite arm of the Macedonian army, and have been regarded as the best cavalry in the ancient world.

In the aftermath of the Macedonian Empire, the Diadochi, successor states created by Alexander the Great's generals, continued the usage of heavy cavalry in their own forces. The Seleucids in particular introduced the use of cataphracts into Western warfare, having learned the practice of completely armouring both man and horse from Iranian tribes encountered during the wars of Alexander the Great.

=== Middle Ages ===
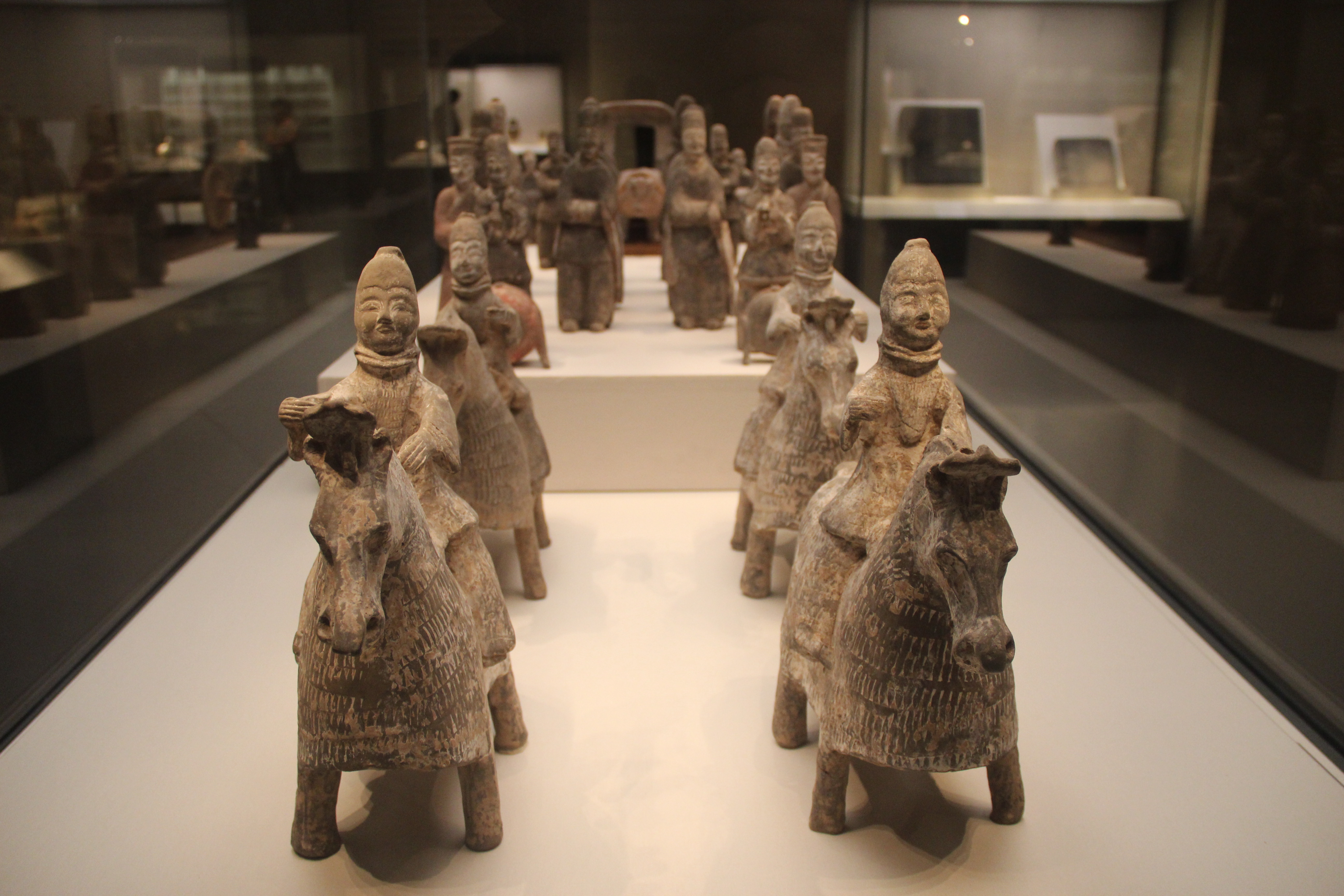
Northern Wei heavy cavalry

A recreation of a medieval joust between heavily armoured knights at a modern Renaissance fair

=== Advent of the stirrup ===
The stirrup, which gives greater stability to a rider, has been described as one of the most significant inventions in the history of warfare, prior to the use of gunpowder. As a tool allowing expanded use of horses in warfare, the stirrup is often called the third revolutionary step in equipment, after the chariot and the saddle. The basic tactics of mounted warfare were significantly altered by the stirrup. A rider supported by stirrups was less likely to fall off while fighting, and could deliver a blow with a weapon that more fully employed the weight and momentum of horse and rider. Among other advantages, stirrups provided greater balance and support to the rider, which allowed the knight to use a sword more efficiently without falling, especially against infantry adversaries.

The metal stirrup was invented in 4th century China, and spread to Europe by the late 6th or early 7th century, primarily due to invaders from Central Asia, such as the Avars and Cumans. By the 8th century the stirrup was in widespread European use, and is later thought to have helped stimulate the creation of early knightly classes in the Carolingian Empire. It has controversially been argued that the stirrup was responsible for the development of feudalism, though this is not fully accepted.

==== Cataphracts ====
Byzantine cataphracts were a much feared force in their heyday. The army of Emperor Nicephorus II, the 'Pale Death of the Saracens' himself, relied on its cataphracts as its nucleus, coupling cataphract archers with cataphract lancers to create a self-perpetuating 'hammer blow' tactic where the cataphract lancers would charge again and again until the enemy broke, all the while supported by cataphract archers.

Contemporary depictions however imply that they were not as completely armoured as earlier Roman and Sassanid types—horse armour is noticeably absent. Byzantine cataphracts of the 10th century were drawn from the ranks of the middle class landowners through the theme system, providing the Byzantine Empire with a motivated and professional force. An experimental type of cataphract was brought to the fore in the 10th and 11th centuries known as the klibanaphoros, "bearer of klibanion"—named after the clibanarius and a throwback to the very heavily armoured cavalry of earlier days. However, the traditional view is that after the loss of prestige, men and material and the horse-rearing plains of Anatolia after they lost the decisive Battle of Manzikert to lighter Turk cavalry, they slowly dropped out of use.

But according to J. Birkenmeier in "The development of the Komnenian army: 1081–1180", units of 'Kataphraktoi' (cataphracts) were still being used during the 12th century. The Komnenian restoration of the Byzantine Empire during that century created a new kind of Byzantine army, which is known as the Komnenian army. Yet it seems that the cataphract was eventually superseded by other types of armoured cavalry. The emperor Manuel I Komnenos, for example, re-equipped his elite cavalry in the style of western knights.

It is difficult to determine when exactly the cataphract saw his final day in battle. After all, both cataphracts and knights fulfilled a similar role on the medieval battlefield, and the armoured knight survived well into the modern age. The Byzantines called all heavy shock cavalry kataphraktoi.

The Byzantine army maintained units of heavily armoured cavalrymen up to its last years, while neighbouring Bulgars, Serbs, Russian states, and other Eastern European peoples emulated Byzantine military training and equipment.

==== Knights ====
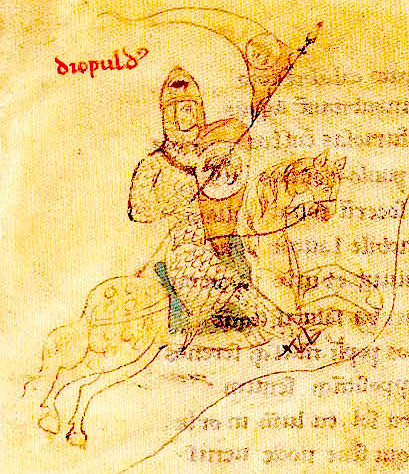
Contemporary depiction in the Liber ad honorem Augusti, of Dipold of Acerra, an early 13th-century knight, when the knight was undisputed master of the battlefield

In the early Middle Ages, the rank of knight was loosely defined. In late Carolingian France (10th century) persons occupying this role were known by the Latin term miles (plur. milites). This term designated a professional fighting man in the emerging feudal system. Many were as poor as the peasant class. However, over time, as this class of fighter became more prominent in post-Carolingian France, they became wealthier and began to hold and inherit land. Eventually fighting on horseback became synonymous with the elite warrior caste.

From the 12th century onwards, the term became associated to cavalry and nobility in general, and thus to the earlier Roman equestrian class (see esquire) as well as the Greek Hippei class. As the expense of equipping and maintaining a knight's equipment was beyond the ability of the primitive medieval state to support, the feudal system became more important as a means of securing the loyalty of knights to the king.

Knighthood was a hereditary title, and was usually passed on by a father to his eldest son. All prospective knights were trained from childhood in the knightly traditions of chivalry as well as war. At the age of six, they first became a servant, or page, in another knight's or lord's household, where they learned etiquette as well as basic combat, and after a few years they became a squire, an apprentice and personal assistant to a fully fledged knight, responsible for maintaining the knight's horse and equipment, as well as arming him for battle. At this point he could choose to remain a squire or become a knight, though many remained a squire due to the restrictions and expense of becoming a knight. A squire was made a knight by his superior lord or king through a ceremony known as "dubbing", swearing allegiance to his feudal masters, charity, and protection of other Christians, as well as to respect the law of the land.

==== Africa and Asia ====
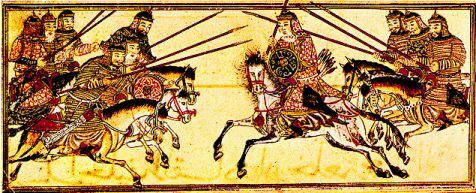
Mongol heavy cavalry in battle (13th–14th century)

Muslim military advances in Sub-Saharan Africa relied heavily on armoured cavalry, playing a similar role to that in medieval Europe.

The Heavy cavalry of the Oyo Empire located in what are now Nigeria and Benin entailed cavalrymen armed with heavy thrusting spears and swords and protected by mail armor. Selected horses were larger imported horses from other neighbouring kingdoms.

In China, heavy cavalry was developed during the Han dynasty (202 BC–220 AD), with armoured lancers becoming widespread during the Western Han era. Armoured cavalry, with both soldier and steed clad in complete armour, were employed in the late Han dynasty, and became widespread in the 4th century AD, where it was the main striking force of the armies of the Northern dynasties of China (4th century to 6th century.) During the Tang dynasty (618–907) the importance of infantry and lighter-armed cavalry and infantry increased while that of the armoured cavalry decreased, with horse armour seldom used. However, armoured cavalry were again used by the Song dynasty (960–1279) and its enemies, including the Jin, Xi Xia, Mongols, and Khitans.

In Korea, the earliest evidence of armoured cavalry is a mid-4th century AD mural of the Goguryeo era (37 BC–668 AD). Lamellar armour was used for both men and horses, with the soldiers carrying lances. Another Goguryeo-era mural shows an armoured cavalryman wielding his lance using both hands, unlike the couched-lance used by medieval European knights. During the Koryo dynasty (918–1392) barding (horse-armour) was still used, but the number of barded heavy cavalry remains unknown. By the early years of the Chosun dynasty (1392–1897) barding was no longer used, and the horseman's main weapon was the bow, with lances and other close-combat weapons seldom used. However, starting from at least the 17th century, the Korean cavalry began to carry two-handed flails along with bows.

=== Renaissance to 20th century ===
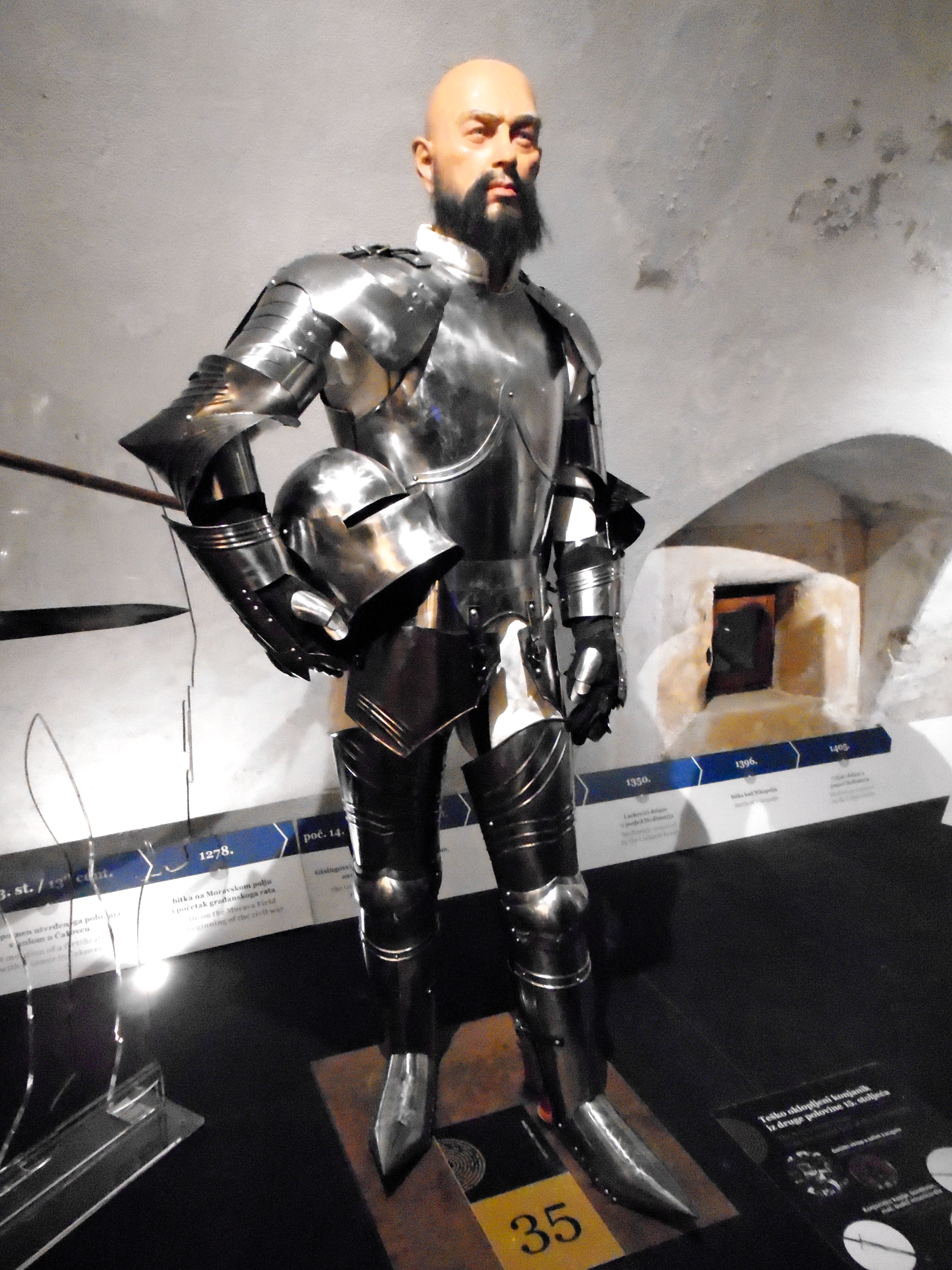
Exhibit of a Croatian Heavy Cavalryman (15th century) at the Međimurje County Museum, Croatia

Armoured cavalry, in the form of the gendarme, was at its highest as a proportion of the total number of combatants in many Renaissance armies, especially in France. Other Western European states also used heavy cavalry very often, such as Spain and the Holy Roman Empire in the Italian Wars.

Central and Eastern Europe saw the emergence of winged hussars that proved a decisive factor in the territorial gains of the Polish–Lithuanian Commonwealth and in its wars with Sweden, Muscovy, and the Ottoman Turks. The winged hussars developed in the second half of the 16th century and were inspired by very similar Hungarian armoured hussars, a lance-wielding and armoured offshoot of the more typical, unarmoured, light cavalry hussars (which originated in Serbia and Hungary and eventually appeared in Poland as well by the early 16th century). Later, the cuirassier was the main form of heavy cavalry, beginning in 1484 with the 100-man strong regiments of Austrian kyrissers for the Holy Roman Emperor Maximilian. In the early 16th century heavy cavalry in the European armies was principally remodeled after Albanian stratioti of the Venetian army, Hungarian hussars and German mercenary cavalry units. A 1551 Venetian document describes that part of the English cavalry was armed in the Albanian fashion.

Two particular types of European heavy cavalry typical of the 16th century and the first half of the 17th century were (i) the Reiter - a form of early cuirassier in half or three-quarters plate armor, armed primarily with a straight-bladed, double-edged one-handed sword (an evolution of the medieval arming sword) and a rider pistol (the first pistol firearms having been invented in the 16th century), or (ii) the demi-lancer - an armoured lancer wearing three-quarters plate armor that continued the mounted man-at-arms lancer traditions established in the late Middle Ages (e.g. in the 15 century). The Polish-Lithuanian winged hussars and the Hungarian armoured hussars-lancers that inspired the winged hussars represented a central European counterpart to the demi-lancer, serving similar tactical roles on 16th and 17th century battlefields.

==== Thirty Years' War ====
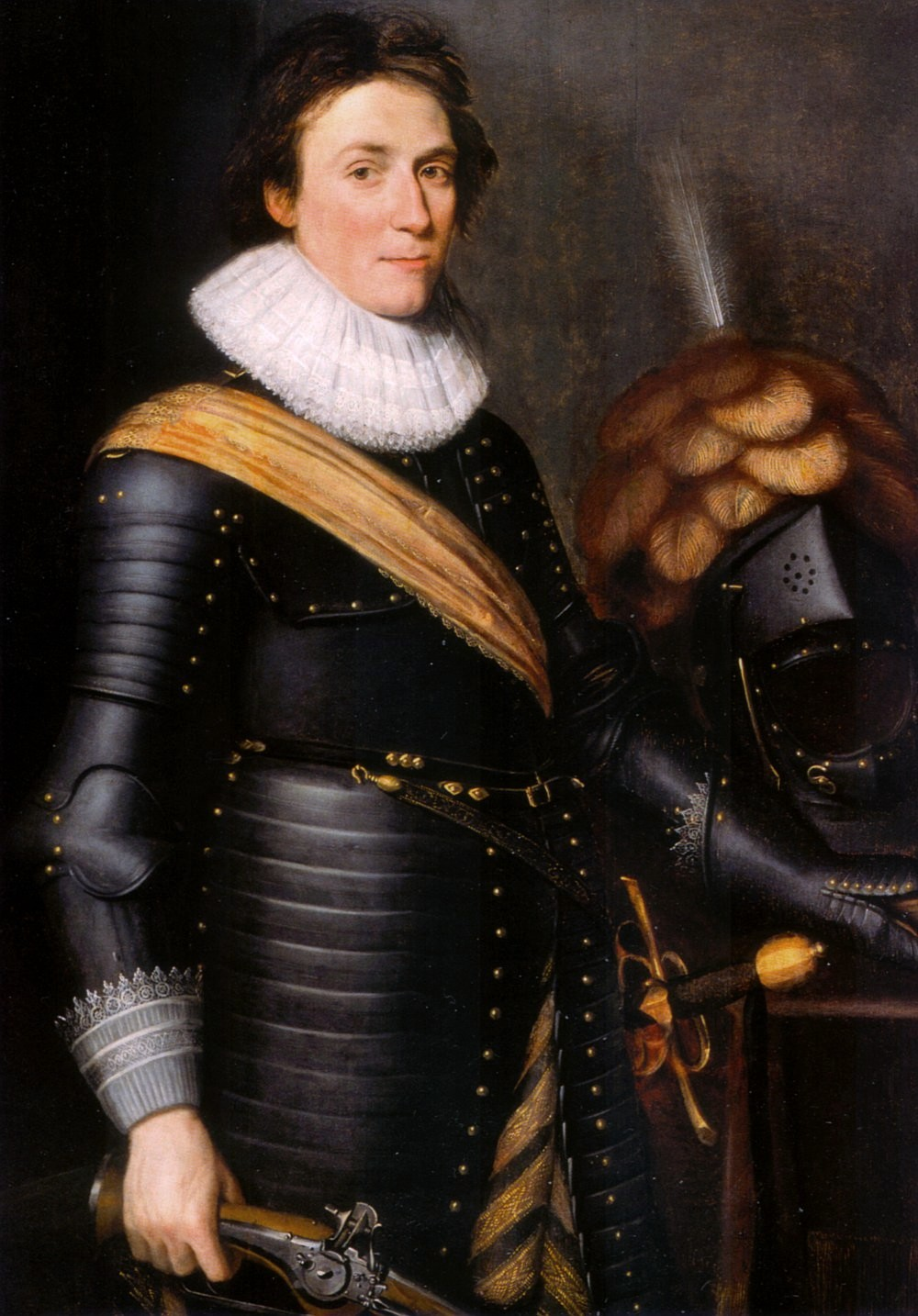
Christian the Younger of Brunswick in the armour of a cuirassier

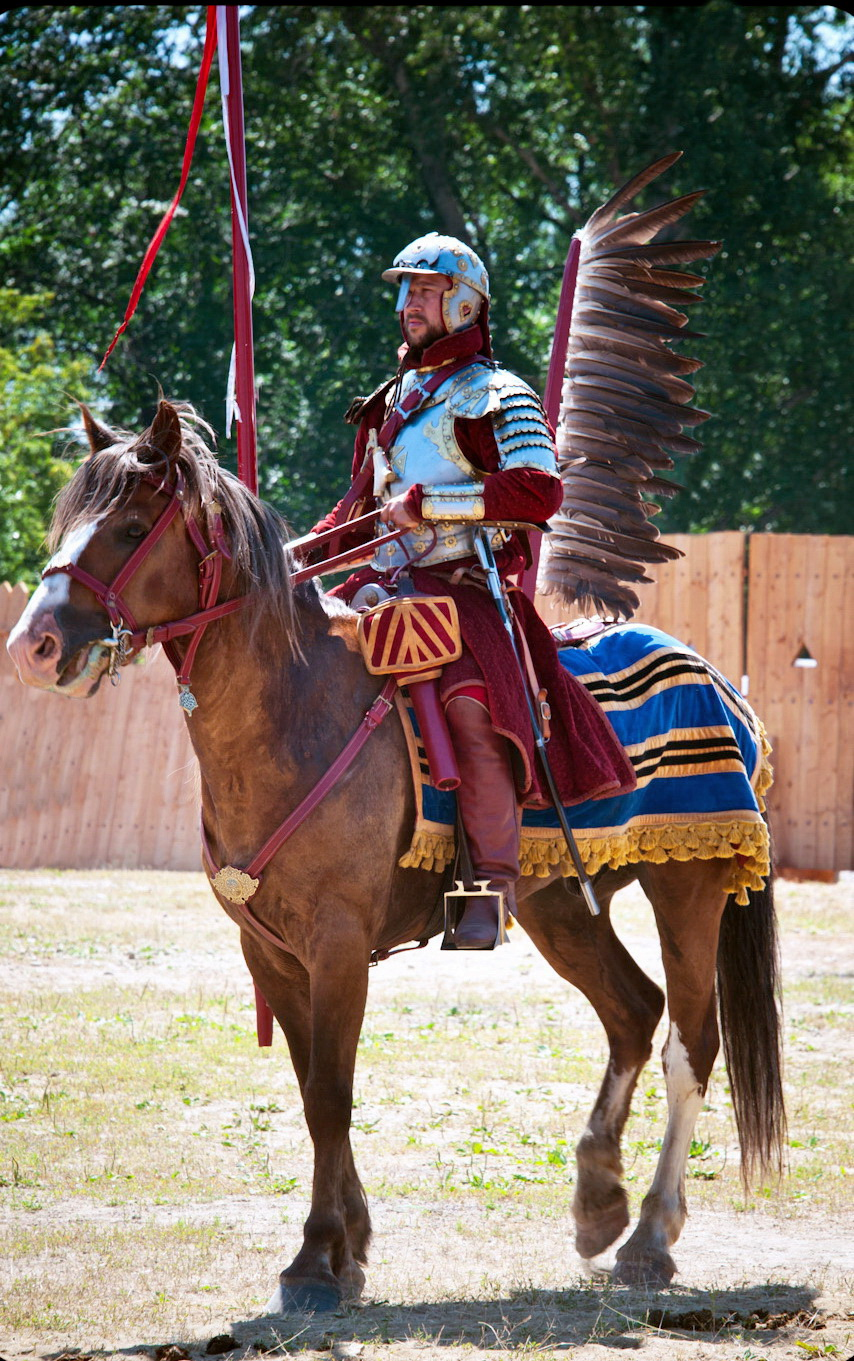
A re-enactor dressed as a Winged Hussar, who served as the heavy cavalry of the Polish Commonwealth

Cuirassiers played a very large role in the Thirty Years' War and the related Eighty Years' War, particularly under the House of Orange and Duchy of Savoy. They represented the last gasp of full plate armour on the battlefield. They would have worn very distinctive plate armour, which typically featured very long and wide tassets, articulated leg protectors which would extend all the way from the breastplate down to the knees. The head would typically have been protected by a fully enclosed burgonet, of which the "Savoyard" style was one notable type. This rounded helmet, frequently featuring a stylized or grotesque face mask, was nicknamed "Totenkopf" or "Death's Head" by the German soldiers who encountered cuirassiers so equipped. The reiters and cuirassiers of some central and eastern European countries also favoured the zischagge helmet in addition to or instead of the burgonet. The cuirassier's armour would have been exceptionally heavy and thick—sometimes up to thirty-six kilogrammes (eighty pounds)—and would be expected to stop a bullet. A regiment of cuirassiers killed the Swedish king Gustavus Adolphus at the 1632 Battle of Lützen. The French introduced their own cuirassiers in 1666. However, the amount of armour worn by the cavalry of the European armies in battle had been substantially reduced, with even the cuirass often worn only to the front.

==== After the Thirty Years' War ====
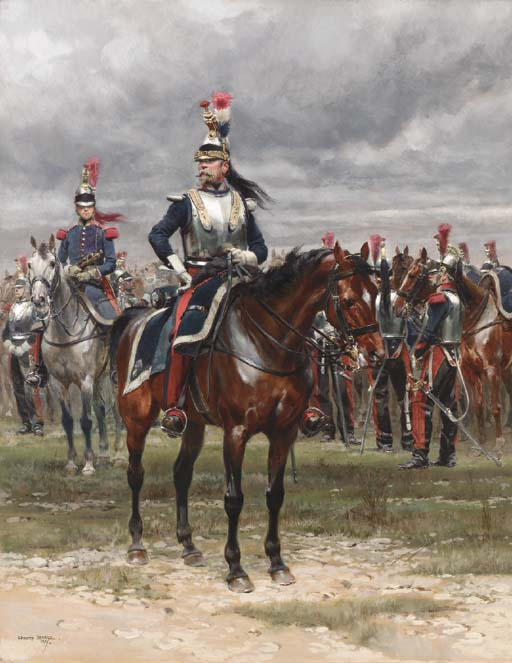
French cuirassiers, 19th century

The heavy cavalry's use of plate armor covering most of the body greatly diminished after the Thirty Year's War. Cuirassiers transitioned to using only a helmet and an enclosed cuirass. In the latter half of the 17th century, most European lancers abandoned the use of armor aside from a helmet, and occasionally a cuirass. European lancers from the 18th century onward were unarmoured light cavalry. Some of the 17th century heavy cavalry also wore a pauncer, a front-only cuirass without a backplate, instead of a full cuirass, as well as a helmet.

By 1705, the Holy Roman Emperor's personal forces in Austria included twenty cuirassier regiments. Imperial Russia formed its own cuirassier regiments in 1732, including a Leib Guards regiment. The Russian cuirassier units took part in the Russo-Turkish War.

Cuirassiers played a prominent role in the armies of Frederick the Great of Prussia and of Napoleon I of France. The latter increased the number of French cuirassier regiments to fourteen by the end of his reign, although they gradually declined in importance as the firepower and accuracy of the muskets and rifles of the infantrymen increased. The cavalry still remained battle-deciders though, with Napoleon maintaining several reserve cavalry corps to be employed at the decisive moment in battle to finally break the enemy formations with a devastating charge.

Given the increased bullet velocity and accuracy of 19th-century firearms, already during the Napoleonic era, the cuirass of the cuirassers of the time was intended primarily as protection from melee attacks (bayonet thrusts, sabre cuts, etc.), rather than from enemy gunfire. Cuirassiers of the 19th century could no longer rely on their armour to largely withstand firearm projectiles, unlike with the slower projectiles of previous centuries.

==== Apache Wars ====
From roughly 1650 to 1820, Spanish heavy cavalry fought Apache warriors in North America. Several small battles occurred; most of the time the Spanish lancers were outnumbered severely but still managed to defeat Apache armies, hundreds of men strong. The climax of these conflicts occurred in the region of present-day Tucson, Arizona, in the United States in the late 18th century in Spanish Arizona.

==== Modern era ====
The last time cavalry of both belligerents wore cuirasses in battle was during the Franco-Prussian War. The Imperial German and Russian cuirassiers subsequently discarded this armour for all but parade purposes, but the twelve regiments of French heavy cavalry still in existence in 1914 wore their cuirasses on active service during the opening stages of World War I. Although some heavy cavalry regiments have remained into the 21st century, their large mounts are today used solely for ceremonial duties, such as those of the Household Cavalry in the United Kingdom.

Today, armoured fighting vehicles such as the tank fills the niche of heavy cavalry.

== See also ==
- Heavy infantry / Light cavalry / Light infantry
- Horses in warfare

== Sources ==
- Carey, B.T., Allfree, J. and Cairns, J. (2006) Warfare in the Ancient World, Pen and Sword, Barnsley ISBN 9781783370689
- Lazaris, Stavros (dir.), Le cheval dans les sociétés antiques et médiévales. Actes des Journées internationales d'étude (Strasbourg, 6-7 novembre 2009), Turnhout: Brepols, 2012, https://www.academia.edu/1784679/Le_cheval_dans_les_sociétés_antiques_et_médiévales._Actes_des_Journées_internationales_détude_Strasbourg_6-7_novembre_2009_
- Weigand, Rudolf Kilian, Halbritter und Schildknechte. Zur Kategorisierung und Illustrierung sozialer Randgruppen im ›Renner‹ Hugos von Trimberg. In: Die Präsenz des Mittelalters in seinen Handschriften. Ergebnisse der Berliner Tagung in der Staatsbibliothek zu Berlin – Preußischer Kulturbesitz, 06. - 08. April 2000, edited by H.-J. Schiewer and K. Stackmann, Tübingen 2002
- Lynn, John Albert, Giant of the Grand Siècle: The French Army, 1610–1715, Cambridge University Press, 1997
- Roemer, Jean, Cavalry: Its History, Management, and Uses in War, D. Van Nostrand, New York, 1863
- Smith, Robert S. (1989). Warfare & Diplomacy in Pre-Colonial West Africa Second Edition. Madison: University of Wisconsin Press. ISBN 0-299-12334-0.
