= Brooklynati =

Studio album by Tanya Morgan
- Released: May 12, 2009
- Genre: Hip-hop
- Length: 68:23
- Label: Interdependent Media
- Producers: Von Pea, Brickbeats, Aeon

Tanya Morgan chronology
Moonlighting (2006)	Brooklynati (2009)	Rubber Souls (2013)

Singles from Brooklynati
- 1. "So Damn Down" Released: June 30, 2009; 2. "Morgan Blu" Released: July 7, 2009; 3. "Never Enough (Crazy Love)" Released: August 4, 2009

Professional ratings
Aggregate scores
Source	Rating
Metacritic	79/100
Review scores
Source	Rating
AllMusic	4/5 stars
The A.V. Club	A−
Robert Christgau	(1-star Honorable Mention)
HipHopDX	3.0/5
The Phoenix	3/4 stars
Pitchfork	5.8/10
PopMatters	9/10
Spin	favorable
Time Out	4/5 stars
XLR8R	8.5/10

Brooklynati is a studio album by American hip-hop group Tanya Morgan. It was released by Interdependent Media and iM Culture on May 12, 2009. It is based on the creation of a fictitious city combining elements from both Cincinnati, Ohio and Brooklyn, New York. To promote the album, the group created a multimedia campaign with a city website including a digital city map, video newscasts and other Brooklynati themes.

== Concept ==
The album contains a mixture of hip-hop songs, and spoken interludes which tell stories relating to the fictional city of Brooklynati. These interludes feature both fictional characters from the city, such as DJ Jurx, the proprietor of Brooklynati’s only record store, as well as real radio personalities, such as Miss Info of New York’s Hot 97, who add a smattering of radio chatter on the more mundane aspects of life in Brooklynati.

In promotion of the album, the band has also created several “Brooklynati Public Access” spots which have appeared on YouTube. These videos include depictions of a typical day in Brooklynati by each member of Tanya Morgan, as well as a music video for the Brooklynati-based 90’s hip-hop group, the Hardcore Gentlemen, who make a brief musical appearance on the record.

== Critical reception ==
At Metacritic, which assigns a weighted average score out of 100 to reviews from mainstream critics, Brooklynati received an average score of 79% based on 8 reviews, indicating "generally favorable reviews".

== Track listing ==
No.	Title	Producer(s)	Length
1.	"On Our Way"	Von Pea	3:36
2.	"Alleye Need" (featuring Piakhan)	Brickbeats	5:32
3.	"So Damn Down"	Von Pea	4:46
4.	"Bang & Boogie"	Brickbeats	3:53
5.	"Don't U Holla" (featuring Jermiside)	Von Pea	3:55
6.	"Hardcore Gentlemen"	Von Pea	1:44
7.	"Plan B" (featuring Napoleon)	Brickbeats	4:02
8.	"Intermission" (featuring Peter Hadar)	Brickbeats	3:14
9.	"She's Gone (Without You)" (featuring Phonte Coleman and Brittany Bosco)	Aeon	4:51
10.	"Never 2ndary" (featuring Jermiside, Che Grand, Elucid, and Spec Boogie)	Brickbeats	5:55
11.	"Just Not True"	Brickbeats	4:23
12.	"Morgan Blu" (featuring Blu)	Von Pea	4:48
13.	"Never Enough (Crazy Love)" (featuring Carlitta Durand)	Von Pea	3:57
14.	"We're Fly" (featuring Kay and Chop)	Von Pea	4:58
15.	"Just Arrived (Now What?)"	Brickbeats	4:28
16.	"Forgot 2 Say" (bonus track)	Von Pea	4:17
