= Everything's Fine (Jean Grae and Quelle Chris album) =

Studio album by Jean Grae & Quelle Chris
- Released: March 30, 2018
- Genre: Experimental hip-hop; jazz rap
- Length: 55:22
- Label: Mello Music Group
- Producer: Quelle Chris; Jean Grae

Jean Grae chronology
The Evil Jeanius (2008)	Everything's Fine (2018)

Quelle Chris chronology
Being You Is Great, I Wish I Could Be You More Often (2017)	Everything's Fine (2018)	Guns (2019)

Singles from Everything's Fine
- 1. "Ohsh" Released: January 23, 2018; 2. "Gold Purple Orange" Released: February 26, 2018; 3. "Zero" Released: March 16, 2018

Everything's Fine is a collaborative studio album by American rappers Jean Grae and Quelle Chris. It was released via Mello Music Group on March 30, 2018. The fifteen-track record features guest appearances from the likes of Your Old Droog, Denmark Vessey, Ashok Kondabolu and comedians Hannibal Buress, Nick Offerman, Michael Che and John Hodgman, among others.

It has been described as a satirical album and critics noted its use of dark humour. The main themes of the album are complacency and stereotypes. It draws influence from many musical genres including jazz and dream pop.

== Background ==
Everything's Fine was announced on January 23, 2018, to be released March 30. Alongside the announcement the first single "Ohsh" was released, which features comic Hannibal Buress.

Jean Grae and Quelle Chris had worked on several projects together before Everything's Fine, including Grae's That's Not How That Works series. On December 3, 2017, Quelle Chris announced on Twitter, "I just proposed to [Jean Grae] and she said yes!" When asked why they chose to work together on the album Chris told Uproxx, "We're together all the time anyway, so it's not like you have to set times to link up or anything. It's like, 'Oh, let's just make an album!'"

Explaining the title Grae says, "As you get older, it tends to be a response that you give more and more without realizing that you're even doing it. You're like, 'Everything's fine,' but the narrator in your head is like, 'Everything was not fine.'"

Chris stated in regards to the theme of the album, "We have a [dickhead] for a president, and before our eyes, racial, religious, and sexual identity rights are moving backwards. Money is still a thing (I'm waiting for Star Trek life to start). There's war, your kids may be sick, but if someone randomly asks 'how's it going?' most people will say 'fine.'"

Chris directed the video for the single "Zero" for which he actually learned to code video games in order to create an authentic, retro look. Jean directed the video for the single "Gold, Purple, Orange".

== Critical reception ==
Professional ratings
Aggregate scores
Source	Rating
AnyDecentMusic?	7.4/10
Metacritic	84/100
Review scores
Source	Rating
AllMusic	4/5 stars
The A.V. Club	B
HipHopDX	4.0/5
Pitchfork	8.4/10
Robert Christgau	(3-star Honorable Mention)
Spectrum Culture	3.25/5 stars
Tiny Mix Tapes	4/5

Everything's Fine was released to critical acclaim. At Metacritic, which assigns a normalized rating out of 100 to reviews from mainstream publications, the album received an average score of 84, based on 9 reviews.

Sheldon Pierce of Pitchfork described the album as "part biting satire, part cognitive behavioral therapy, Jean Grae and Quelle Chris' collaboration is a hilarious, caustic, and gorgeous consideration of what it really means to be 'fine' today". Paul Simpson wrote for AllMusic, "The darkly humorous album [Everything's Fine] sarcastically riffs on this sense of false, clichéd optimism, as well as stereotypes, the whitewashing of hip-hop (and popular culture in general), and the general sense of anxiety surrounding day-to-day existence." The A.V. Club described the album as a "sprawling and intentionally distancing record, but never less than fascinating". Justin Ivey of HipHopDX praised the album's "mix of satire and biting commentary" and use of comedians "to aid in shaping the album's sardonic attitude." In a positive review for Tiny Mix Tapes, Rounak Maiti states "for an album so complex — one that's simultaneously funny and fearless — it has an uncanny way of simplifying things."

Everything's Fine was ranked the 24th best release of the year in The Wire magazine's annual critics' poll. Exclaim! named it the 10th best hip-hop album of the year.

== Track listing ==
Credits adapted from Bandcamp and Discogs.

No.	Title	Writer(s)	Producer(s)	Length
1.	"Everything's Fine"	T. Ibrahim; G. Tennille	Jean Grae	1:07
2.	"My Contribution to This Scam"	T. Ibrahim; G. Tennille	Quelle Chris	4:42
3.	"Ohsh" (featuring Hannibal Buress)	T. Ibrahim; G. Tennille	Quelle Chris	4:31
4.	"House Call" (featuring Big Tone, Anna Wise, and Jonathan Hoard)	T. Ibrahim; G. Tennille	Quelle Chris	3:17
5.	"Don't Worry It's Fine" (featuring John Hodgman and Michael Che)	T. Ibrahim; G. Tennille	Quelle Chris	0:50
6.	"Gold Purple Orange"	T. Ibrahim; G. Tennille	Quelle Chris	5:00
7.	"Peacock"	T. Ibrahim; G. Tennille	Jean Grae	3:16
8.	"Doing Better Than Ever" (featuring Ashok Kondabolu)	T. Ibrahim; G. Tennille	Quelle Chris	2:07
9.	"The Smoking Man" (featuring Denmark Vessey)	G. Tennille; D. Vessey	Quelle Chris	3:53
10.	"Breakfast of Champions"	T. Ibrahim; G. Tennille	Quelle Chris	3:14
11.	"Scoop of Dirt" (featuring Your Old Droog)	T. Ibrahim; G. Tennille; Your Old Droog	Quelle Chris	4:03
12.	"Zero"	T. Ibrahim	Quelle Chris	4:45
13.	"Everything's Still Fine" (featuring Nick Offerman)	G. Tennille	Quelle Chris	2:12
14.	"Waiting for the Moon" (featuring Mosel and Anna Wise)	T. Ibrahim; G. Tennille	Quelle Chris	5:29
15.	"River" (featuring Anna Wise)	T. Ibrahim; G. Tennille	Jean Grae	6:56
Total length:				55:22

== Personnel ==
Credits adapted from liner notes.

- Quelle Chris – vocals, producer (2–6, 8–14)
- Jean Grae – vocals, producer (1, 7, 15)
- Dane Orr – saxophone (6, 7), mixing (6, 14)
- Melanie Charles – flute (15)
- Paul "Bae Bro" Wilson – keyboards (15), mixing (1–7, 9, 10, 14, 15)
- Willie Green – mixing (2, 9, 10)
- Zeke Mishanec – mixing (6, 14)
- I, Ced – mixing, mastering
- Mindy Tucker – photography
- Hannibal Buress – featured artist (3)
- Big Tone – featured artist (4)
- Anna Wise – featured artist (4, 14, 15)
- Jonathan Hoard – featured artist (4)
- John Hodgman – featured artist (5)
- Michael Che – featured artist (5)
- Ashok Kondabolu – featured artist (8)
- Denmark Vessey – featured artist (9)
- Your Old Droog – featured artist (11)
- Nick Offerman – featured artist (13)
- Mosel – featured artist (14)
