= Cavalry Group =

Army unit in Empire of Japan

The Cavalry Group (Japanese: 騎兵集団) of the Imperial Japanese Army (IJA) was formed on April 21, 1933, consisting of the IJA 1st Cavalry Brigade and IJA 4th Cavalry Brigade. It was originally assigned to the Kwantung Army. The IJA 3rd Cavalry Brigade was added in October 1937.

== Timeline ==
On July 11, 1938, the Cavalry Group was assigned to the North China Area Army. IJA 4th Cavalry Brigade was detached to the Central China Expeditionary Army's Second Army on October 11, 1938.

On November 11, 1938, the Cavalry Group was assigned to the Japanese Twelfth Army.

At the end of January 1939, the Cavalry Group was assigned to the Mongolia Garrison Army.

The Cavalry Group was disbanded on December 1, 1942, with the formation of the Third Tank Division.
