= Different Type Time =

Studio album by Cavalier
- Released: April 19, 2024
- Genre: Hip-hop
- Length: 58:40
- Label: Backwoodz Studioz
- Producer: Quelle Chris; Cavalier; Glasscity; Jacob Rochester; Aummaah; Messiah Musik; Wino Willy; Malik Abdul-Rahmaan; Fushou; Low Key; Ohbliv; Ahwlee; Ruffiankick; Vinny Cuzns; Hann_11; Child Actor

Cavalier chronology
Private Stock (2018)	Different Type Time (2024)	Cine (2024)

Different Type Time is a studio album by American rapper Cavalier. It was released on April 19, 2024, through Backwoodz Studioz.

== Background ==
Cavalier is an American rapper born in Brooklyn, New York, and based in New Orleans, Louisiana. Different Type Time is his first solo album since Private Stock (2018). It contains 21 tracks. Eight tracks are produced by his longtime collaborator Quelle Chris. In a 2024 interview, when asked about the album's title, Cavalier said, "Different Type Time came about in me processing that I wasn't obligated to move at the speed of binge watch or streaming culture." The album was released on April 19, 2024, through Backwoodz Studioz.

== Critical reception ==
Professional ratings
Review scores
Source	Rating
Pitchfork	8.0/10
Spectrum Culture	70%

Thomas Stremfel of Spectrum Culture commented that "Different Type Time's crowning achievement is sonic cohesion, creating a world of familiar sounds, where all songs merge together like neighboring but distinct characters on a thriving city block in the summer." Andrew Sacher of BrooklynVegan wrote, "Different Type Time finds Cav doing what he does best, and if you're new to him, this is a fine introduction." He added, "The lush production and in-the-pocket bars connect the dots between rap's mid '90s era and its current underground." John Morrison of Okayplayer praised "its hazy production, winding, serpentine rhyme patterns and slick lines." Son Raw of The Fader stated, "A welcome addition to hip-hop's creative vanguard, Different Type Time proves that Cavalier's moment is now."

=== Accolades ===
Year-end lists for Different Type Time
Publication	List	Rank	Ref.
BrooklynVegan	30 Best Rap Albums of 2024	20	
The Fader	The 50 Best Albums of 2024	46	
Okayplayer	The 50 Best Albums of 2024	—	
Paste	The 100 Best Albums of 2024	67	
The Ringer	The Ringer's 30 Best Albums of 2024	25	
Rolling Stone	The 100 Best Albums of 2024	87	

== Track listing ==
Different Type Time track listing
No.	Title	Producer(s)	Length
1.	"Different Type Time"	Quelle Chris; Cavalier	1:32
2.	"Custard Spoon"	Quelle Chris	2:01
3.	"Can't Leave It Alone" (featuring Eric Jaye)	Glasscity	4:06
4.	"Come Proper"	Jacob Rochester	3:15
5.	"Touchtones"	Aummaah	2:23
6.	"Déjà vu" / "Tydro '97"	Messiah Musik; Quelle Chris	4:00
7.	"Doodoo Damien"	Quelle Chris	2:10
8.	"Baby I'm Home"	Wino Willy	0:48
9.	"Yeah Boiii"	Quelle Chris	2:12
10.	"All Things Considered"	Wino Willy	2:19
11.	"Pears"	Malik Abdul-Rahmaan	3:09
12.	"Told You"	Fushou	2:42
13.	"Badvice"	Low Key	2:41
14.	"Think About It" (featuring Billzegypt)	Ohbliv	2:59
15.	"Up from Here" / "7th Ward Spyboy"	Ahwlee; Quelle Chris	1:49
16.	"Manigaults" / "I Miss Them"	Ruffiankick	4:41
17.	"Lazaroos"	Vinny Cuzns	1:31
18.	"Bespoke" (featuring Dominic Minix)	Hann_11	2:14
19.	"50 Bags" (featuring Lord Chilla)	Child Actor	4:36
20.	"Axiom" / "My Gawd"	Glasscity; Quelle Chris	3:49
21.	"Flourish"	Quelle Chris	3:36
Total length:			58:40

== Personnel ==
Credits adapted from liner notes.

- Cavalier – vocals, recording, executive production, creative direction, layout, graphics
- Lord Ebel-Cherry – additional vocals (on "Different Type Time")
- Eric Jaye – additional vocals (on "Can't Leave It Alone")
- Yah-Ra – additional vocals (on "Come Proper" and "Touchtones")
- Tydro Elite – additional vocals (on "Tydro '97")
- Quelle Chris – additional vocals (on "Up from Here"), associate production
- Lord Chilla – additional vocals (on "50 Bags")
- Billzegypt – additional vocals (on "Axiom")
- Blvck Spvde – additional vocals (on "Axiom")
- Dominic Minix – guitar (on "Bespoke")
- Alex Riddle – recording
- Chad Roby – recording
- Michael "Maitre D" Cochran – recording
- J. Stylez – recording, mixing, mastering
- 35mmgold – photography
