= Innocent Country =

Studio album by Quelle Chris and Chris Keys
- Released: July 10, 2015
- Genre: Hip-hop
- Length: 32:48
- Label: Mello Music Group
- Producer: Chris Keys

Quelle Chris and Chris Keys chronology
Innocent Country (2015)	Innocent Country 2 (2020)

Quelle Chris chronology
Ghost at the Finish Line (2013)	Innocent Country (2015)	Lullabies for the Broken Brain (2016)

Innocent Country is the first collaborative studio album by American rapper Quelle Chris and producer Chris Keys. It was released through Mello Music Group on July 10, 2015.

== Background ==
San Francisco Bay Area producer Chris Keys and Detroit rapper/producer Quelle Chris started to develop the Innocent Country project after meeting through mutual collaborator Roc Marciano. The twelve-track LP audio production was entirely handled by Chris Keys, and featured guest appearances by the likes of Denmark Vessey, Cavalier, Fresh Daily, The Fiends, and Big Sen.

Innocent Country is the third record of Quelle's ongoing 2Dirt4TV series, followed by Niggas Is Men (released in 2013) and 2Dirt4TV (released in 2012). Its sequel, Innocent Country 2, was released in April 2020.

== Singles and music videos ==
On June 25, 2015, Quelle released a music video for "Where the Wild Things Roam", co-directed with Eric Mercure.

The project's lead single, "I Asked God", was released on June 10, 2015.

Music video for "Nothing Moves" was directed by Da Dreak for Eyewerk Films and was released on September 16, 2015.

== Critical reception ==
Professional ratings
Review scores
Source	Rating
AllMusic	3.5/5 stars
Exclaim!	7/10
HipHopDX	4/5
Pitchfork	6.9/10

Paul Simpson of AllMusic gave the album 3.5 stars out of 5, describing it as "a playful set of reflections about life and all of its troubles and disappointments, and how to cope with it all." Marcus J. Moore of Pitchfork gave the album a 6.9 out of 10, stating, "The soundtrack moves between wistful and nonsensical moments, which leads to a strong alliance with Quelle who, across several projects, uses conversational flows of disconnected thoughts."

== Track listing ==
All music is composed by Chris Keys.

No.	Title	Length
1.	"Freedom & Fear"	2:32
2.	"Where the Wild Things Roam"	2:51
3.	"We Want It Alive" (featuring Fresh Daily and Cavalier)	3:36
4.	"Well Running Deep"	3:49
5.	"Madness in the Oasis"	2:44
6.	"The Ones to Watch"	2:22
7.	"Nothing Moves"	2:13
8.	"Murphy's Law" (featuring Denmark Vessey)	3:26
9.	"Drugfest TooThousandToo" (featuring The Fiends)	2:10
10.	"The Plan" (featuring Denmark Vessey)	3:03
11.	"The Mirror" (featuring Big Sen)	0:48
12.	"I Asked God"	3:14
Total length:		32:48
