= Buy Muy Drugs =

Studio album by Buy Muy Drugs
- Released: September 15, 2017
- Genre: Hip hop; alternative hip hop
- Length: 44:01
- Label: Ether Jung
- Producer: Denmark Vessey; Azarias; Billy the Kid

Buy Muy Drugs chronology
Buy Muy Drugs (2017)	Mannaflxxn (2018)

Singles from Buy Muy Drugs
- 1. "American Robot" Released: July 18, 2017; 2. "Mfkzt" Released: August 22, 2017; 3. "O.K." Released: August 24, 2017; 4. "Buy My App" Released: August 30, 2017

Buy Muy Drugs is the debut studio album by Buy Muy Drugs, an American hip hop duo consisting of Denmark Vessey and Azarias. It was released through Ether Jung on September 15, 2017. It includes contributions from Open Mike Eagle, Yasiin Bey, Adad, Quelle Chris, Sassi Blaque, Big Tone, and Billy the Kid.

== Critical reception ==
Professional ratings
Review scores
Source	Rating
Pitchfork	6.8/10

Marcus J. Moore of Pitchfork wrote, "The album reminds us to stay the course and ignore the nonsense, to find some kind of peace in a world that's become increasingly unstable." Paul Demerritt of Creative Loafing commented that "the brevity allows the group to experiment with a variety of sounds, from Afro-Brazilian rhythms to swells of dissonance and industrial percussion akin to Death Grips." He added, "Radical juxtaposition defines nearly every track, but the group's own sense of taste keeps the album cohesive amid the chaos."

== Track listing ==
Buy Muy Drugs track listing
No.	Title	Length
1.	"BMD Co."	0:44
2.	"Lipstick"	2:19
3.	"Crime.Wav"	2:18
4.	"Cop That Feeling"	0:40
5.	"Mfkzt"	2:54
6.	"American Robot" (featuring Open Mike Eagle)	3:41
7.	"Pressure"	1:19
8.	"Dog Days"	0:50
9.	"O.K."	2:47
10.	"Buy My App" (featuring Yasiin Bey)	3:37
11.	"American Dirge"	2:21
12.	"Smoke the Weak"	1:14
13.	"Hyperdope Drogas"	3:24
14.	"Haveknots vs. Ascots" (featuring Adad)	2:56
15.	"Yayu"	2:21
16.	"See Jack Run" (featuring Quelle Chris)	3:23
17.	"Man Bite Hand" (featuring Sassi Blaque and Big Tone)	2:55
18.	"Fore!"	0:25
19.	"We All Float Down Here"	3:52

== Personnel ==
Credits adapted from liner notes.

- Denmark Vessey – production
- Azarias – production
- Open Mike Eagle – vocals (6)
- Yasiin Bey – vocals (10)
- Adad – vocals (14)
- Billy the Kid – co-production (14)
- Quelle Chris – vocals (16)
- Sassi Blaque – vocals (17)
- Big Tone – vocals (17)
- Brendan Forrest – guitar
- Ra90i – recording
- Josh Berg – recording
- Doug Saltzman – mixing, mastering
- MF NY – cover art
