= Martin Lucid Dream =

EP by Denmark Vessey
- Released: October 9, 2015
- Recorded: 2015
- Genre: Hip hop
- Length: 25:15
- Label: Rappers I Know
- Producer: Denmark Vessey (also exec.); Frank William Miller Junior (exec.); Damien Randle (exec.); Azarias; Earl Sweatshirt; Exile; T-White

Denmark Vessey chronology
Life, In My Direction (2013)	Martin Lucid Dream (2015)	Whole Food (2016)

Martin Lucid Dream is the second extended play by American rapper and producer Denmark Vessey. Composed of eight tracks, it was released on October 9, 2015, via Rappers I Know, and re-released in 2017 with two bonus tracks. Production was handled by Azarias, T-White, Exile and Denmark himself. It features guest appearances from Black Milk, Guilty Simpson, MosEL, Stretch Money, and Tanya Morgan.

== Music and lyrics ==
Throughout the EP, Denmark Vessey addresses the ups and downs of his absurd life with a keen sense of humor. The tone of Martin Lucid Dream is exemplified by the song "Think Happy Thoughts." It is an introspective look at the challenges of life, united by a positive-thinking mantra Vessey inherited from his mother and late grandmother. The track contains soothing vocal harmonies and guitar strums provided by Exile. It gives way to a comedic church skit and then the disjointed string arrangements of "Keep Your Hoes In Check," where Vessey contemplates both deep and shallow questions.

== Release and promotion ==
Denmark released a music video for Exile-produced track "Think Happy Thoughts" directed by Jeremy Ian Thomas on July 6, 2016.

== Critical reception ==
Rolling Stone magazine ranked the extended play at number 34 of their list of the 40 Best Rap Albums of 2015.

== Track listing ==
No.	Title	Producer(s)	Length
1.	"Warning" (featuring Guilty Simpson)	Denmark Vessey	2:48
2.	"Dr. Martin Lucid Dream" (featuring Tanya Morgan)	Azarias	3:50
3.	"Don't Smoke K2"	T-White	1:58
4.	"Nerd Niggas"	Denmark Vessey	3:08
5.	"Chemtrails"	T-White	2:45
6.	"Think Happy Thoughts and Keep Your Hoes in Check"	Exile; Azarias	5:22
7.	"Be Great" (featuring Black Milk)	Denmark Vessey	1:39
8.	"Everyday" (featuring Mosel and Stretch Money)	Denmark Vessey	3:45
Total length:			25:15

2017 re-release bonus tracks
No.	Title	Producer	Length
9.	"Katt Williams"	T-White	1:51
10.	"Snowing in LA"	Earl Sweatshirt	3:05
Total length:			30:11

== Personnel ==
- Aleksander Manfredi – additional producer
- Azarias – additional producer
- Byron Simpson – featured artist
- Curtis Cross – featured artist
- Damien Randle – executive producer, additional mixing
- Denmark Vessey – main artist, executive producer, producer
- Devon Callender – featured artist
- Donald Freeman – featured artist
- Doug Saltzman – mixing, mastering
- Frank William Miller Junior – creative direction, design, executive producer
- Mosel – featured artist
- Stretch Money – featured artist
- Tyler T-White – additional producer
- Thebe Kgositsile – producer
