= Cavalry Division =

A cavalry division is a division-level military unit composed primarily of cavalry regiments. "Cavalry Division" may refer to:

- unique units (sole cavalry divisions) in a particular army, including:
  - the Cavalry Corps, Army of Northern Virginia, Confederate Army, during the US Civil War;
  - the Cavalry Division (Greece), a unit of the Hellenic Army that saw action during World War II;
  - the 1st Cavalry Division (Polish), between 1919 and 1939;
  - a unit of the Phayap Army, part of the Royal Thai Army during World War II;
  - the 1st Cavalry Division (United States),
  - the Cavalry Division (United Kingdom), a British unit raised in World War I for service in Mesopotamia
  - the Cavalry Group, a division-like Imperial Japanese Army unit comprising several cavalry brigades, and;
- a particular type of formation in various armies:
  - Cavalry Divisions (Imperial Russia)
  - Cavalry division (Soviet Union)
- TOE, German Cavalry Division, August 1914
