= Cavalier Chocolate =

Belgian chocolate manufacturer

Cavalier
- Company type: Private
- Industry: Chocolatier
- Founded: 1996
- Headquarters: Eeklo, Oost-Vlaanderen, Belgium
- Area served: Belgium
- Products: sugar-free or no sugar added chocolate: bars, Tablets, Sea Shells, chocolates, paste, biscuits
- Website: www.cavalier.be

Cavalier is a family-owned Belgian chocolate manufacturer founded in 1996, making only no-sugar-added chocolate products.

Cavalier develops, produces and distributes chocolate products and biscuits without adding sugar to the traditional ingredients. It is the only Belgian manufacturer making only chocolate products without added sugar.

== Stevia chocolates ==
The product ranges from chocolate bars, chocolate tablets over sea shells to pralines (chocolate shells with soft fillings).

In December 2011, after the European Parliament approved the use of sweeteners from Stevia (Steviol glycosides), a herb originating from the Rainforest in the borderlands of Paraguay and Brazil; Cavalier was the first Authentic Belgian Chocolatier to come onto the EU market with its Stevia Chocolate range (initially consisting of 35 different products and flavours). In addition, the new Stevia chocolates range was Fair Trade Certified.

Cavalier's Stevia Chocolate range was launched in January 2011 at the ISM Show in Cologne (Germany), the world's largest confectionery trade show for sweets and snacks. In the 2012 show, Cavalier was awarded the "ISM New Product Showcase Top Innovation Award" for its Fair Trade certified Stevia Chocolate range.

== Review ==
The Belgian Brood en Banket (or "Pain et Patisserie") magazine described their products as "the best alternative" in an article published in December 2008.
