= Dorothy Cavalier Yanik =

American artist, educator (1928-2015)

Dorothy Miriam Cavalier Yanik (1928–2015) was an American artist and arts educator, known for her printmaking, fiber arts, and painting. She taught at Carnegie Mellon University (CMU) in Pittsburgh.

== About ==
Dorothy Miriam Cavalier was born on 3 February 1928 in Baltimore, Maryland. In 1960, Yanik took private weaving lessons from Anni Albers. She studied under Josef Albers at Yale University, and earned a B.F.A. degree in 1963. In 1975, she received her M.F.A. degree from Hoffberger School of Painting at Maryland Institute College of Art (MICA). She married architect and professor, John Yanik. Yanik's work was included in a 2018 book Anni Albers and the 2017 book On Weaving: New Expanded Edition and in related 2018 art exhibition at the Tate museum.

She taught at Philadelphia College of Art (1965–1967), Catholic University of America (1977–1978), Trinity Washington University (1973–1979), American University (1975–1982), and Arizona State University at Tempe (1982–1984).

She died on 27 May 2015 at her home in Bethesda, Maryland.
