= 4th Cavalry Brigade (Imperial Japanese Army) =

- Active: 1909–1945
- Country: Japan
- Allegiance: Emperor of Japan
- Branch: Imperial Japanese Army
- Type: Cavalry
- Role: infantry
- Part of: 3rd Division (Imperial Japanese Army)
- Garrison/HQ: Toyohashi
- Engagements: World War II

The 4th Cavalry Brigade (騎兵第4旅団, Kihei Daishi Ryodan) of the Imperial Japanese Army was originally formed April 1, 1909.

It was assigned to Kwantung Army in April 1933 as part of the IJA Cavalry Group. It was then assigned to the Cavalry Group to Northern China Area Army, June 1938. On September 5, 1939, 4th Cavalry Brigade was put directly under North China Area Army. Again with the Group, it was assigned to Mongolia Garrison Army in February 1939. Assigned to Twelfth Army in December 1942.

== Organization ==
4th Cavalry Brigade

- 25th Cavalry Regiment
- 26th Cavalry Regiment
- Brigade Mounted Artillery Regiment

Later additions

- Brigade Machinegun unit
- Brigade Anti-tank artillery squadron
- Brigade Tank unit
- Independent Infantry Battalion (motorized)
- Independent Engineer Squadron (motorized)
- 4th Mounted Artillery Regiment
- 72nd Cavalry Regiment

== See also ==
- IJA Cavalry Units
