= Jean Roemer =

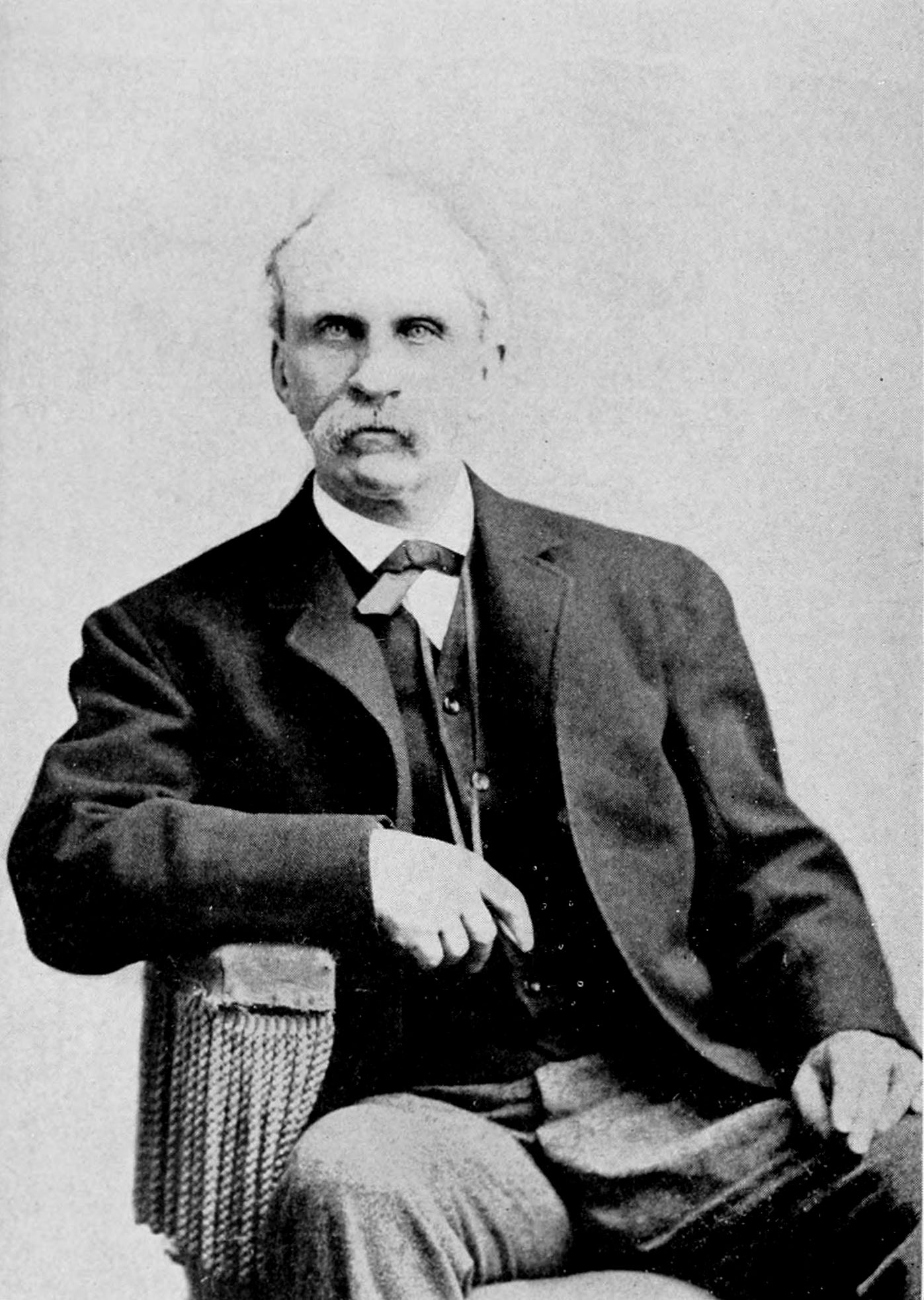

Jean Roemer (born in England about 1815; died in Lenox, Massachusetts, 31 August 1892) was a Dutch soldier and a United States professor of French language and literature at the City College of New York.

== Biography ==
He was taken in infancy to Hanover, and afterward to Holland. His early education was conducted under the guardianship of William I, king of the Netherlands, and Frederica Louisa, Princess of Orange, and wife of Charles George Augustus, heir-apparent of the crown of Brunswick. He was destined for the army, and served on the Dutch side throughout the Belgian Revolution, a war of secession between Holland and Belgium. At the close of the war he visited the great military establishments of France, Prussia, and Austria, and completed his studies in Lombardy under the guidance and auspices of Field-Marshal Count Radetzky.

Subsequently, he resided in Naples, where a close intimacy with the Prince of Syracuse, ex-viceroy of Sicily, and some articles that were attributed to him, caused much comment. They gave umbrage to King Ferdinand II, whose distrust of the liberal tendencies of his brother lent to this friendship a political significance. It became the subject of diplomatic correspondence, and led to the Roemer's recall from Italy early in 1845.

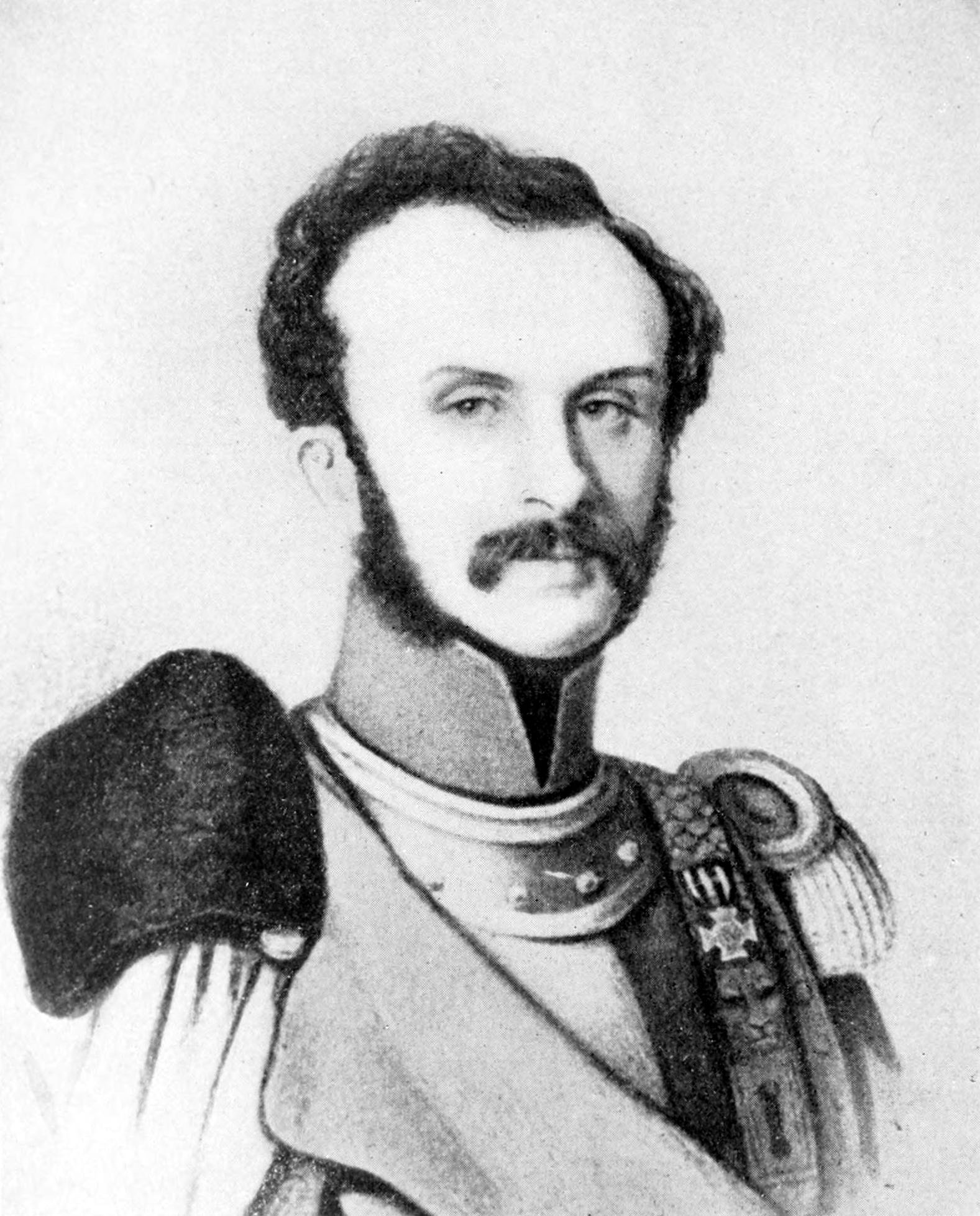
Roemer as a captain in the Dutch army

Some time after the death of William I, whose successor on the throne appears to have been influenced by a different spirit from that of his father concerning Roemer, the pretensions of the latter began to take a definite form, setting forth claims to titles and estates, the right to which was denied him on special grounds, which ever since have been maintained against him. Strong efforts made in his behalf did not avail, and even at the congress of German sovereigns, held in Frankfurt in 1863, a well-supported attempt at compromise and conciliation remained without result.

From 1846 he resided in the United States. In 1848 he accepted the post of professor of the French language and literature in the New York Free Academy, and in 1869 he was appointed vice-president of the College of the City of New York, which place he occupied while he lived.

== Works ==
In addition to articles and pamphlets on agriculture, education, and linguistics, he published:

- Dictionary of English-French Idioms (New York, 1853)
- Polyglot Readers (5 vols., 1858)
- Cavalry: its History, Management, and Uses in War (1863)
- Cours de lecture et de traduction (3 vols., 1884)
- Principles of General Grammar (1884)
- Origins of the English People and of the English Language (1888)
