= Bilal Salaam =

American historiographer and academic

- Born: Bilal Salaam; Newark, New Jersey, United States
- Education: Istanbul Bilgi University (PhD); Rutgers University (MA); Rutgers University (MS); Morgan State University (BA)
- Occupations: professor, historiographer, composer, academic
- Scientific career
- Workplaces: Rutgers University (2011-2013); Istanbul Commerce University (2024-)
- Patrons: New York City Teaching Fellows
- Thesis: American Ventriloquism: Lambert Hendricks and Ross
- Academic advisors: Lewis Porter; Jay M. Shuttleworth
- Website: bilalsalaam.com

Bilal Salaam is an American professor, art historiographer, composer and academic. He is currently a lecturer at Istanbul Ticaret University.

== Education ==
Through a Fanonian framework, Salaam's historiographical Master of Arts dissertation entitled American Ventriloquism focused on specific genres of American art, not as products of cultural appropriation, but cultural projection, wherein majorities project their cultures on to minorities.

His Master of Science in Education capstone employed Patricia Carini's descriptive review as formulated vis a vis Edmund Husserl’s phenomenology through the lens of Paulo Freire’s Pedagogy of Hope, Pedagogy in Process, Pedagogy of the Heart, Pedagogy of Freedom and Education for Critical Consciousness.

== Musical career ==
As a graduate of Rutgers University's Music Historiography Master of Arts program, and under the program's chair Lewis Porter, Bilal Salaam's thesis, American Ventriloquism framed vocalese through a theoretical deconstruction of cultural appropriation.

Salaam's musical sound was described by Soul Culture magazine as "a left of centre, soulful "Kid A".

Washington D.C.'s City Paper characterized "Heart Alarm", the single from Salaam's third album, Pedagogia Do Oprimido, as "calm", "quirky", and "acquired".

Kevin Nottingham called Bilal's Boulder, a 2012 release, "seven tracks of sheer aural orgasms".

Prior to recording as a solo artist, Bilal Salaam toured internationally with the Morgan State University Choir, and Raheem DeVaughn.

Salaam's Swordlord series is inspired by Muhammad's swords.

== Discography ==
=== Albums ===
Year	Album title	Label
2007	Blah/Time Between Asleep & Awake	Ultravybe Inc.
2008	Langue De Rasoir	Noohustle
2011	Pedagogia Do Oprimido	Noohustle
2012	Bilal's Boulder	Noohustle
2021	Swordlord: Swordz	Independent
2021	Swordlord: V.J. Sweengz Birdie, Eagle & Albatross	Independent
2021	Swordlord: Baqallah	Independent
2021	Swordlord: D'awegawd	Independent
2021	Swordlord: Fiver Zaydi	Independent
2021	Swordlord: Swordz II Zakat	Independent
2021	Swordlord: Sevener Ismaili	Independent

=== Production ===
- Ruff Drafts Volume 1 (track: 8) – JapaNUBIA Musik 2006
- Langue De Rasoir (tracks: 1, 3, 5 & 6) – Noohustle 2008
- Peau Noire, Masques Blancs (all tracks) – Noohustle 2008
- Dirty Soul Electric (track: 5) – BBE 2008
- The Awakening (track: 5) – JapaNUBIA Musik 2008
- Border Breaker (all tracks (vocal production)) – Ghetto Falsetto 2009
- Before Taxes (track: 5) – Mello Music 2010
- the Earn (track: 10 (vocal production)) – Mello Music 2011
- Pedagogia Do Oprimido (all tracks) – Noohustle 2011
- Bilal's Boulder (all tracks) – Noohustle 2012

=== Guest appearances ===
- Thinking Back, Looking Forward (track: 5) – Neosonic Productions 2004
- Ruff Drafts Volume 1 (track: 4) – JapaNUBIA Musik 2006
- Artifact Hearts Volume One (track: 15) – Ankh Ba 2006
- 93 Million Miles & Rising (track: 1) – Ankh Ba 2006
- Cuba After Market (tracks: 1 & 12) – Humble Monarch Music/Rawkus 50 2007
- Develop (track: 2A) – Soul Step 2007
- Zen Badism (track: 9) – Freedom School 2008
- Dirty Soul Electric (track: 5) – BBE 2008
- Distraction City (track: 13) – Tasteful Licks 2008
- Conflict (track: 4) – Sy Smith 2008
- Mental Liberation (track: 3) – Mello Music 2009
- Random Joints (track: 3) – Low Budget 2009
- Before Taxes (tracks: 5 & 16) – Mello Music 2010
- the Earn (track: 5) – Mello Music 2011
- Oakwood Grain (track: 2–10) – Humble Monarch Music 2012
- The Many Districts of Soulful Shanghai (tracks: 3, 10 & 14) – Kindred Spirits 2012
- "Fleeting Physical" – (produced by Ya'koob of Sons of Yusuf) The Base Productions 2012
- (Vibe)Rations (track: 11) – Iman Omari Music 2013
- The Booth Shall Set You Free (track: 12) – Soul Spazm 2014
- Persona (track: 16) – Mello Music 2015
- Odds & Ends (track: 5) – Mello Music 2015
- I'm The Bridge You Must Burn (track: 18) – Mello Music 2016
- Being You Is Great, I Wish I Could Be You More Often (track: 14) – Mello Music 2017
- Sunday Mass (track: 9) – Mello Music 2019
- Straight Shot (track: 10) – Mello Music 2019
