= Quelle Chris =

American rapper and producer (born 1984)

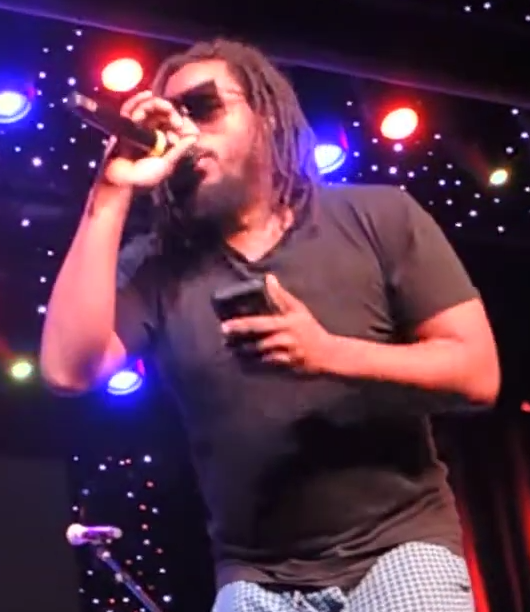
- Tennille performing in 2019

Background information
- Also known as: Quelle; Awesome in Outer Space
- Born: Gavin Christopher Tennille; October 19, 1984 (age 41); New York, U.S.
- Origin: Detroit, Michigan, U.S.
- Genres: Hip-hop; punk rock
- Occupations: Record producer; songwriter; rapper
- Label: Mello Music Group
- Formerly of: Crown Nation; Wasted Youth; Temps

Gavin Christopher Tennille (born October 19, 1984), known as Quelle Chris, is an American record producer, rapper and songwriter from Detroit, Michigan. He has released over 15 albums as a solo act and with his collaborative projects.

== Career ==
Tennille was born in Johnson City, New York to a shoe designer.

Tennille began his music career in the Detroit hip-hop scene. His career began expanding as he joined Wasted Youth, where he attracted the attention of other Detroit-based artists such as J Dilla and Proof. Tennille and fellow rapper Denmark Vessey later formed a musical group called Crown Nation, in which Tennille soon adopted the pseudonyms Q-Life and Quelle, the latter of which means "source" in German. With credit as a songwriter on several songs on Danny Brown's early albums, he began working on a solo career.

His debut studio album, Shotgun & Sleek Rifle, was released in 2011, featuring guest appearances from artists such as Brown, Roc Marciano and Big Tone. He signed with Mello Music Group after releasing two extended plays with the music group Racehorses are Resources, which also consisted of poet John Sinclair. With two studio albums Niggas Is Men and Ghost at the Finish Line released on the label in 2013, Tennille produced for musicians such as Pharoahe Monch, Diamond District and Open Mike Eagle.

His fourth studio album Innocent Country was released in 2015, followed by the 2016 instrumental album Lullabies for the Broken Brain. His fifth studio album Being You Is Great, I Wish I Could Be You More Often was released in 2017. He described the album as "about being human. Being great, being flawed, being you". His debut collaborative album titled Everything's Fine with his life partner Jean Grae was released on March 30, 2018, via Mello. On March 29, 2019, Tennille released his acclaimed sixth solo album Guns. On March 16, 2020, Tennille released his seventh solo album Innocent Country 2 and released it on April 24. It features guest appearances from Earl Sweatshirt, Billy Woods, Tune-Yards' Merrill Garbus, Denmark Vessey, Homeboy Sandman, Pink Siifu, and Josh Gondelman. Tennille returned with his seventh album, Deathfame on May 13, 2022. The 14-track album was primarily produced by himself.

== Personal life ==
In December 2017, he proposed to his longtime partner who is also his frequent collaborator, Jean Grae. The two married on August 5, 2018.

== Discography ==
=== Studio albums ===
Title	Details
Shotgun & Sleek Rifle	Released: November 15, 2011; Label: Mello, Sony; Format: Download, CD
Ghost at the Finish Line	Released: October 29, 2013; Label: Mello, Sony; Format: Download, CD
Innocent Country (with Chris Keys)	Released: July 10, 2015; Label: Mello, Sony; Format: Download, CD
Being You Is Great, I Wish I Could Be You More Often	Released: February 10, 2017; Label: Mello, Sony; Format: Download, CD, streaming
Guns	Released: March 29, 2019; Label: Mello, Sony; Format: Download, CD, 2xLP, streaming
Innocent Country 2 (with Chris Keys)	Released: April 24, 2020; Label: Mello, Sony; Format: Download, CD, streaming
Deathfame	Released: May 14, 2022; Label: Mello, Sony; Format: Download, CD, streaming

=== Collaborative albums ===
Title	Details
Everything's Fine (with Jean Grae)	Released: March 30, 2018; Label: Mello, Sony; Format: Download, CD, streaming
Death Tape 1: Black Cottonwood (with Cavalier)	Released: December 2022; Label: Self Released; Format: Digital Download
Death Tape 2: We 'Gon Need Each Other (with Cavalier and Denmark Vessey)	Released: September 2024; Label: Self Released; Format: Digital Download

=== Instrumental albums ===
Title	Details
Lullabies for the Broken Brain	Released: February 26, 2016; Label: Mello, Sony; Format: Download, CD, streaming

=== Mixtapes ===
Title	Details
Niggas Is Men	Released: March 19, 2013; Label: Mello, Sony; Format: Download, CD

== Awards and nominations ==
Year	Nominee / work	Award	Result	Ref.
2023	Special	Grammy Award for Album of the Year	Nominated	
