= Denmark Vessey =

American rapper (born 1984)

- Also known as: Denmark; Denmark Vessy
- Born: Denmark Martin Vessey; August 28, 1984 (age 41); Detroit, Michigan, U.S.
- Origin: Detroit, Michigan, U.S.
- Genres: Hip hop
- Occupations: Rapper; record producer
- Years active: 2006–present
- Labels: Street Corner Music; Mello Music Group; Rappers I Know
- Formerly of: Crown Nation
- Website: denmarkvessey.com

Denmark Martin Vessey (born August 28, 1984) is an American rapper and record producer from Detroit, Michigan. He is also a member of hip hop duo Crown Nation with Quelle Chris. He was named after Denmark Vesey, leader of a slave revolt planned in 1822 in Charleston, South Carolina; it was interrupted before any actions took place. He is also a member of the west coast collective Dirty Science.

== Career ==
Vessey grew up listening to Babyface, Guy, Canibus, Timbaland, and Jay-Z.

Denmark and Quelle formed Crown Nation in 2006, and in 2008, the duo relocated from Detroit, Michigan to Chicago, Illinois and released the crew’s debut LP $lutbag Edition a year after.

Denmark released his debut solo EP titled I'd Rather Be Making Bread via No Love City in 2012, and he collaborated with Chicago-based producer Steven Scud One for the full-length Cult Classic which was released through Dirty Science record label in 2013 and was rated 3.5 of 5 stars according to HipHopDX. He dropped his eleven-track self-released album Life, In My Direction on the same year, and his second EP Martin Lucid Dream in 2015, which was ranked number 34 on Rolling Stone magazine's 40 Best Rap Albums of 2015. Both Crown Nation members appeared on the track "The Forgotten (Don’t Look Away)" from Hip Hop After All album by European rapper/producer Guts. Following Denmark's instrumental release of The Gift, Vol. 9 with DJ House Shoes on Street Corner Music, he teamed up with Austin, Texas-based producer Gensu Dean (who worked with Planet Asia and Guilty Simpson) for the 2016 full-length album Whole Food on Mello Music Group. On January 31, 2017, he collaborated with another Chicago rapper/producer DRXQUINNX and producer Azarias as Doppelganger to release the group's debut self-titled EP. Later that year, Denmark again collaborated with Azarias under the name Buy Muy Drugs, and the duo released a self-titled LP on September 15, 2017.

Denmark has worked with and provides music for some of Detroit’s most respected artists, such as Slum Village, Danny Brown, Guilty Simpson, Dwele, Monica Blaire, L’Renee, and DJ Houseshoes (official tour DJ for Mayer Hawthorne).

== Discography ==
=== Studio albums ===
- Slutbag Edition (with Quelle Chris, as Crown Nation) (2009)
- Life in My Direction (2013)
- Cult Classic (with Scud One) (2013)
- The Gift (with House Shoes) (2015)
- Whole Food (with Gensu Dean) (2016)
- Buy Muy Drugs (with Azarias, as Buy Muy Drugs) (2017)
- The Bridge (with Wolphonics and Asha Griffith) (2018)
- Bullies (with DrxQuinnx and Azarias, as Bullies) (2019)

=== Extended plays ===
- I'd Rather Be Making Bread (2012)
- Martin Lucid Dream (2015)
- Doppelganger (with DrxQuinnx and Azarias, as Doppelganger) (2017)
- Sun Go Nova (2018)
- Class Act (with Soul Theory) (2019)

=== Mixtapes ===
- Don't Drink the Kool Aid (2013)
