= Mello Music Group discography =

The following is an incomplete discography for Mello Music Group, an independent hip hop record label based in Tucson, Arizona. Artists such as Mr. Lif, Oddisee, Big Pooh and Open Mike Eagle have released records through Mello Music Group.

== Discography ==
=== Main CD series ===
MMGCD series of releases for Mello Music Group
Yr	Cat#	Release title	Artist(s)	CD release date
2008	MMG001	101	Oddisee	Dec 9, 2008
2009	MMG002	Mental Liberation	Oddisee	May 5, 2009
2009	MMG003	New Money	Trek Life & Oddisee	May 5, 2009
2009	MMG004	Black & Read All Over	Sareem Poems	Jul 28, 2009
2009	MMG005	In The Ruff	Diamond District (Oddisee, yU & Uptown XO)	Oct 27, 2009
2010	MMG006	Someothaship	Georgia Anne Muldrow & Declaime	Feb 23, 2010
2010	MMG007	Traveling Man	Oddisee	Mar 2, 2010
2010	MMG008	Before Taxes	yU	Apr 13, 2010
2010	MMG009	The Reset	Apollo Brown	May 18, 2010
2010	MMG010	Everything Changed Nothing	Trek Life	Aug 10, 2010
2010	MMG012	The Brown Study	Boog Brown & Apollo Brown	Sep 28, 2010
2010	MMG011	Gas Mask	The Left (Apollo Brown, Journalist 103 & DJ Soko)	Oct 26, 2010
2010	MMG013	Vweto	Georgia Anne Muldrow	Dec 14, 2010
2011	MMG014	Wouldn't Change Nothing	Trek Life	Aug 23, 2011
2011	MMG015	Clouds	Apollo Brown	Mar 1, 2011
2011	MMG016	In Case I Don't Make It	Has-Lo	Mar 29, 2011
2011	MMG017	Odd Seasons	Oddisee	May 17, 2011
2011	MMG018	Rock Creek Park	Oddisee	Sep 6, 2011
2011	MMG019	Daily Bread	Hassaan Mackey & Apollo Brown	Aug 2, 2011
2011	MMG020	Makin' Dollas	DTMD	Sep 27, 2011
2011	MMG021	the EARN	yU	Dec 13, 2011
2011	MMG012B	The Brown Study Remixes	Boog Brown & Apollo Brown	Dec 20, 2011
2012	MMG022	Behind The Scale	Sean Born	Feb 14, 2012
2012	MMG023	Lo-Fi Fingahz	Gensu Dean	Feb 28, 2012
2012	MMG024	A Friendly Game Of KT	14KT	Mar 6, 2012
2012	MMG025	Self Sacrifice	various	Mar 27, 2012
2012	MMG026	Trophies	Apollo Brown & O.C.	May 1, 2012
2012	MMG027	As Himself	Stik Figa	Apr 17, 2012
2012	MMG028	People Hear What They See	Oddisee	Jun 12, 2012
2012	MMG029	Home Is Where The Art Is	Substantial	Sep 4, 2012
2012	MMG030	Heaven's Computer	7even Thirty	Sep 25, 2012
2012	MMG031	Libretto: Of King Legend	The Black Opera	Oct 30, 2012
2012	MMG032	Dice Game	Guilty Simpson & Apollo Brown	Nov 13, 2012
2013	MMG033	Colour de Grey	Uptown XO	Feb 5, 2013
2013	MMG034	Abrasions	Gensu Dean & Planet Asia	Mar 5, 2013
2013	MMG035	Hometown Foreigner	Trek Life	Apr 16, 2013
2013	MMG036	Ugly Heroes	Ugly Heroes	May 28, 2013
2013	MMG-LTD003	33 and a Third	Def Dee	July 23, 2013
2013		Re.Turn	Duke Westlake	Jul 30, 2013
2013	MMG037	Gasface	Castle	Jul 30, 2013
2013	MMG039	The Cognac Tape	Hus Kingpin & Roc Marciano	Oct 1, 2013
2013	MMG040	The City Under The City	L'Orange & Stik Figa	Oct 15, 2013
2013	MMG041	Ghost At The Finish Line	Quelle Chris	Oct 29, 2013
2013	MMG042	Dr. Stokley	Dudley Perkins	Dec 3, 2013
2013	MMG043	Tangible Dream	Oddisee	Dec 10, 2013
2013	MMG044	Victim Of A Modern Age	Jamall Bufford	Dec 10, 2013
2014	MMG045	Mandala, Vol. 1: Polysonic Flows	various	Feb 4, 2014
2014	MMG046	Mandala Vol. 2 Today's Mathematics	various	Feb 4, 2014
2014	MMG047	Sound of the Weapon	Verbal Kent	Feb 11, 2014
2014	MMG048	Return Of The Gasface	Castle	Apr 1, 2014
2014	MMG050	The Orchid Days	L'Orange	Apr 15, 2014
2014	MMG051	Thirty Eight	Apollo Brown	May 13, 2014
2014	MMG052	Dark Comedy	Open Mike Eagle	Jun 10, 2014
2014	MMG053	The Problem	7evenThirty & Gensu Dean	Jul 8, 2014
2014	MMG054	Live Like You're Dead	Has-Lo & Castle	Aug 5, 2014
2014	MMG056	The Great Year	The Black Opera	Sep 30, 2014
2014	MMG057	March on Washington	Diamond District	Oct 14, 2014
2014	MMG058	Blasphemy	Ras Kass & Apollo Brown	Oct 28, 2014
2014	MMG059	People Of Today	The 1978ers	Nov 11, 2014
2015	MMG060	Square One	Kenn Starr	Jan 27, 2015
2015	MMG00061	SynthBASED	Drew Dave	Feb 24, 2015
2015	MMG00063	March on Washington (Redux)	Diamond District	Mar 10, 2015
2015	MMG00064	Persona	various	Mar 10, 2015
2015	MMG00065	Words Paint Pictures	Rapper Big Pooh	Mar 24, 2015
2015	MMG00066	Look What This World Did to Us	Red Pill	Apr 8, 2015
2015	MMG00067	The Night Took Us In Like Family	L'Orange & Jeremiah Jae	Apr 21, 2015
2015	MMG00068	The Good Fight	Oddisee	May 5, 2015
2015	MMG00069	A Thoughtiverse Unmarred	Georgia Anne Muldrow	May 19, 2015
2015	MMG00071	PeteStrumentals 2	Pete Rock	Jun 23, 2015
2015	MMG00073	Time? Astonishing!	L'Orange & Kool Keith	Jul 24, 2015
2015	MMG00074	Odds & Ends	Finale	Aug 14, 2015
2015	MMG00075	Anesthesia	Verbal Kent	Sep 11, 2015
2015	MMG00077	Grandeur	Apollo Brown	Sep 25, 2015
2015	MMG00076	Breakfast at Banksy's	Semi Hendrix (Ras Kass & Jack Splash)	Oct 16, 2015
2015	MMG00078	Home Sweet Home	Rapper Big Pooh & Nottz	Nov 13, 2015
2016	MMG00083	Times and Material	Cavanaugh (Open Mike Eagle & Serengeti)	Feb 12, 2016
2016	MMG00085	Lullabies for the Broken Brain	Quelle Chris	Feb 26, 2016
2016	MMG00079	Hella Personal Film Festival	Open Mike Eagle & Paul White	Mar 25, 2016
2016	MMG00084	Don't Look Down	Mr. Lif	Apr 15, 2016
2016	MMG00080	The Odd Tape	Oddisee	May 13, 2016
2016	MMG00089	Alwasta	Oddisee	Jun 10, 2016
2016	MMG00087	Everything in Between	Ugly Heroes	Jun 24, 2016
2016	MMG00088	Whole Food	Gensu Dean & Denmark Vessey	Jul 29, 2016
2016	MMG00090	For Mark, Your Son	Lando Chill	Aug 12, 2016
2016	MMG00092	Instinctive Drowning	Red Pill	Aug 26, 2016
2016	MMG00091	Feature Magnetic	Kool Keith	Sep 16, 2016
2016	MMG00094	The Easy Truth	Apollo Brown & Skyzoo	Sep 30, 2016
2016	MMG00093	The Life & Death of Scenery	L'Orange & Mr. Lif	Oct 14, 2016
2016	MMG00096	R.A.W.	Gensu Dean	Dec 9, 2016
2017	MMG00098	Central Standard Time	Stik Figa	Jan 27, 2017
2017	MMG00097	Being You Is Great, I Wish I Could Be You More Often	Quelle Chris	Feb 10, 2017
2017	MMG00095	The Iceberg	Oddisee	Feb 24, 2017
2017	MMG00081	Day Drunk LP	Red Pill	Mar 31, 2017
2017	MMG00099	Game of Death	Gensu Dean & Wise Intelligent	Jun 2, 2017
2017	MMG00100	The Boy Who Spoke to the Wind	Lando Chill	Jun 23, 2017
2017	MMG00101	Resolution	The Perceptionists (Mr. Lif & Akrobatik)	Jul 28, 2017
2017	MMG00102	Anchovies	Apollo Brown & Planet Asia	Aug 25, 2017
2017	MMG00103	The Ordinary Man	L'Orange	Oct 27, 2017
2018	MMG00105	Portraits	Chris Orrick	May 4, 2018
2018	MMG00106	Brick Body Kids Still Daydream	Open Mike Eagle	Sep 15, 2017
2018	MMG00107	Everything's Fine	Jean Grae & Quelle Chris	Mar 30, 2018
2018	MMG00108	Sun Go Nova	Denmark Vessey	Apr 20, 2018
2018	MMG00109	Beneath the Surface (Live)	Oddisee & Good Company	Nov 10, 2017
2018	MMG00110	Plush Seats	Calvin Valentine	Mar 9, 2018
2018	MMG00111	Echo Chamber	MC Paul Barman	May 18, 2018
2018	MMG00112	The Brown Tape	Ghostface Killah	Jan 26, 2018
2018	MMG00113	Marlowe	L'Orange & Solemn Brigham	Jul 13, 2018
2018	MMG00114	You're No Fun	Illingsworth	Sep 28, 2018
2018	MMG00115	Out to Sea	Chris Orrick	May 24, 2019
2018	MMG00117	No Question	Apollo Brown & Locksmith	Jun 15, 2018
2018	MMG00119	Mona Lisa	Apollo Brown & Joell Ortiz	Oct 26, 2018
2019	MMG00120	Blessing in Disguise	Elaquent	Feb 22, 2019
2019	MMG00121	Keep Summer Safe	Calvin Valentine	Sep 14, 2018
2019	MMG00122	Black Ego	Lando Chill	Oct 12, 2018
2019	MMG00123	Thina	Seba Kaapstad	May 17, 2019
2019	MMG00124	The Sound of Lasso	The Lasso	Mar 15, 2019
2019	MMG00125	Guns	Quelle Chris	Mar 29, 2019
2019	MMG00127	Keith	Kool Keith	Jul 12, 2019
2019	MMG00128	Soul on Ice 2	Ras Kass	Sep 6, 2019
2019	MMG00129	Sportee	Nolan the Ninja	Apr 19, 2019
2019	MMG00130	Sincerely, Detroit	Apollo Brown	Oct 29, 2019
2019	MMG00131	Napkins	Calvin Valentine	Jun 7, 2019
2019	MMG00132	Vweto II	Georgia Anne Muldrow	Jun 21, 2019
2019	MMG00133	Monday	Joell Ortiz	Aug 30, 2019
2019	MMG00134	Retropolitan	Skyzoo & Pete Rock	Sep 20, 2019
2019	MMG00135	G.I.T.U.	Chris Rivers	Aug 16, 2019
2019	MMG00137	Complicate Your Life with Violence	L'Orange & Jeremiah Jae	Oct 4, 2019
2019	MMG00138	Dusty	Homeboy Sandman	Oct 18, 2019
2019	MMG00139	Illphoria	Nolan the Ninja	Dec 3, 2019
2019	MMG00140	I Read That I Was Dead	Chris Orrick & The Lasso	Nov 15, 2019
2020	MMG00142	Dueling Experts	Dueling Experts (Recognize Ali & Verbal Kent)	Jan 31, 2020
2020	MMG00143	Kirlian	Psypiritual & The Lasso	Feb 7, 2020
2020	MMG00144	Forever Is a Pretty Long Time	Elaquent	Feb 21, 2020
2020	MMG00145	Innocent Country 2	Quelle Chris & Chris Keys	Apr 24, 2020
2020	MMG00141	Take Your Time	Blakk Soul	May 8, 2020
2020	MMG00146	H.A.R.D.	Joell Ortiz & Crooked I	May 29, 2020
2020	MMG00152	Milestones	Skyzoo	Jun 19, 2020
2020	MMG00148	Your Birthday's Cancelled	Iron Wigs (Vic Spencer, Verbal Kent & Sonnyjim)	Jun 27, 2020
2020	MMG00147	As God Intended	Apollo Brown & Che Noir	Jul 10, 2020
2020	MMG00126	LSD: Lunar Solar Duality	Cambatta	Jul 21, 2020
2020	MMG00150	Marlowe 2	L'Orange & Solemn Brigham	Aug 7, 2020
2020	MMG00151	Aphelion's Traveling Circus	Namir Blade	Sep 18, 2020
2020	MMG00155	Don't Feed the Monster	Homeboy Sandman	Oct 16, 2020
2020	MMG00153	Don't Play It Straight	Small Bills (E L U C I D & The Lasso)	Oct 30, 2020
2020	MMG00154	Konke	Seba Kaapstad	Nov 13, 2020
2020	MMG00159	DE2: Sand the Floor	Dueling Experts (Recognize Ali & Verbal Kent)	Dec 11, 2020
2021	MMG00156	All The Brilliant Things	Skyzoo	Jun 11, 2021
2021	MMG00160	Bushido	various	Apr 2, 2021
2021	MMG00161	2121	The Lasso	Feb 19, 2021
2021	MMG00162	Lovesick	Raheem DeVaughn & Apollo Brown	Jun 4, 2021
2021	MMG00163	Imaginary Everything	L'Orange & Namir Blade	May 7, 2021
2021	MMG00157	Season of the Se7en	Bronze Nazareth & Recognize Ali	Apr 16, 2021
2021	MMG00165	Tri Magi	The Lasso, Jordan Hamilton & The Saxsquatch	Jul 16, 2021
2021	MMG00164	Anjelitu	Homeboy Sandman	Aug 6, 2021
2021	MMG00167	The World Is Still Chaos, But I Feel Better	L'Orange	Sep 3, 2021
2021	MMG00166	South Sinner Street	Solemn Brigham	Sep 24, 2021
2021	MMG00170	Ego	Guilty Simpson & Gensu Dean	Oct 8, 2021
2021	MMG00168	Autograph	Joell Ortiz	Nov 12, 2021
2021	MMG00169	Blacklight	Apollo Brown & Stalley	Nov 19, 2021
2022	MMG00173	There In Spirit	Homeboy Sandman	Feb 25, 2022
2022	MMG00171	Holy Body Roll	A. Billi Free & The Lasso	Mar 11, 2022
2022	MMG00174	Deathfame	Quelle Chris	May 13, 2022
2022	MMG00175	This Must Be The Place	Apollo Brown	Jul 8, 2022
2022	MMG00179	Still Champion	Homeboy Sandman	Nov 11, 2022
2022	MMG00176	Cost of Living	Apollo Brown & Philmore Greene	Nov 15, 2022
2022	MMG00177	Marlowe 3	L'Orange & Solemn Brigham	Oct 28, 2022
2022	MMG00180	Somebody Up There Loves Me	Stalley	Dec 6, 2022
2022	MMG00178	I Turned Myself Into Myself	SHIRT (Jack Splash)	Nov 22, 2022
2023	MMG00182	Black Elvis 2	Kool Keith	Jun 16, 2023
2023	MMG00181	Signature	Joell Ortiz & L'Orange	Aug 11, 2023
2023	MMG00185	Omakase	various	Aug 25, 2023
2023	MMG00183	Sardines	Apollo Brown & Planet Asia	Sep 8, 2023
2023	MMG00184	Period.	Paradime	Sep 22, 2023
2023	MMG00186	Rediscovery	Elaquent	Nov 3, 2023
2024	MMG00189	I'm Fine, Thanks For Asking.	Marv Won	Apr 5, 2024
2024	MMG00191	Project Freedom	Jordan Hamilton	May 31, 2024
2024	MMG00192	Mind Blossom	Fr1th	Jun 14, 2024
2024	MMG00187	Man of the House	Cash Lansky	Apr 26, 2024
2024	MMG00188	The Spirit Is Willing, But The Flesh Is Weak	Jabee	Oct 4, 2024
2024	MMG00196	The Grand Design	Philmore Greene	Oct 25, 2024
2024	MMG00199	This, Is Not That	Apollo Brown & Crimeapple	Dec 6, 2024
2025		L	Paradime	Feb 4, 2025
2025	MMG00200	Satisfied Soul	Brother Ali	Feb 14, 2025
2025	MMG00203	Love & Rockets 3:16 (The Emancipation)	Murs	Aug 15, 2025
