= Journalist 103 =

American rapper (born 1979)

- Also known as: J Clip
- Born: January 21, 1979 (age 47); Detroit, Michigan
- Genres: Hip hop
- Occupation: Rapper
- Years active: 1997–present
- Label: Babygrande
- Website: Journalist 103 on Facebook

Journalist 103 (born January 21, 1979) is an American rapper. After starting his career as part of the hip hop crew Mountain Climbaz in 1997, he later joined hip hop group The Left. He served as primary lyricist on the group's 2010 album Gas Mask, which Sputnik Music named one of the Best Underground Hip-Hop Albums of 2010.

In 2012 he released his debut solo album Reporting Live on Babygrande Records. With guest appearances by Freeway, Saigon, Fashawn, and production by Oddisee and Snowgoons, lyrically the album addresses diverse themes and incorporates a number of hip hop subgenres. Journalist 103 is currently working on his sophomore solo album, also to be released on Babygrande.

== Early life ==
Journalist 103 was born and raised in Detroit, Michigan. After developing an interest in music, his cousin X-Gov was one of his first inspirations to go into rap, exposing him to artists such as DJ Premier and Gang Starr. He went on to listen to artists such as Proof, Royce, and Phat Kat. Other artists influential in his youth include Ice Cube, The Wu Tang Clan, and Eminem. Rapping by the age of eleven, he initially rapped under the name J Clip before changing his moniker to Journalist 103. Stated Journalist 103, "I earned my name from one of my old high school teacher's. We had to do a brief commercial in written form. When I submitted it she read it and told me I was a really good writer and that I should be a journalist. So the name just stuck with me ever since." He attended Detroit Central High School, and by age eighteen he was beginning to go to shows and market his music.

== Music career ==
=== 1990s-04: Mountain Climbaz, singles ===
Around 1997 he started professionally emceeing, performing at open mics around Detroit. He met and began collaborating with the producer Strike, forming the hip hop crew Mountain Climbaz. Other members joined and they performed in Detroit. While with Mountain Climbaz he became associated with Iron Fist Records, run by Proof, and made guest appearances on tracks by other artists. He contributed to the opening track ("Broken") on Proof's 2002 album Electric Coolaid Acid Testing. His 2003 track "Broken Again" featuring Mu, Proof, and Marvwon, received an award for best hip-hop group song of the year in 2004. The Mountain Climbaz released their only album, Unnecessary Roughness, in July 2004. In June 2005 Journalist 103 released his first solo mixtape, K.R.A.M. Movement.

=== 2010: The Left, Gas Mask ===
After the disbanding of Mountain Climbaz, Journalist 103 co-founded the hip hop group The Left with Detroit producer Apollo Brown. The duo brought in DJ Soko to add to the tracks and DJ for their live performances. Journalist 103 was a primary lyricist behind the group's debut album Gas Mask, released in 2010. According to the Michigan Citizen, "the concept of the album’s title was to warn audiences that hip hop music is being used against the people like poison. Positive, thought-provoking music can act as a 'gas mask' to help filter out the nonsense."

Gas Mask was named Best Album of 2010 by KevinNottingham.com, and was in the Top 25 Albums of 2010 by HipHopDX and DJ Premier. Sputnik Music named it one of the Best Underground Hip-Hop Albums of 2010. Stated HipHopDX, Gas Mask "captured a nostalgic prestige with Journalist playing an integral part as the mouthpiece of the group's movement."

=== 2012: Reporting Live ===
His debut solo album, "Reporting Live", was released by the New York-based independent label Babygrande Records in 2012. Reporting Live had guest appearances by Freeway, Saigon and Fashawn, and production from The Audible Doctor, Oddisee, Apollo Brown, and Snowgoons. The diverse topics addressed on the album include "love, following your dreams to success and the violence on the streets being a reflection of the violence of war and oppression in the world." His first single from Reporting Live, "Walk With Me," paints a picture of Detroit, with Oddisee producing.

Reception

"What stands out the most on Reporting Live is Journalist 103’s command on the microphone. From the lyrical vigor and socio-political narrative of 'United We Stand' to the melancholic disclosure of drug addiction within his family on '3 AM,' there’s magnetic conviction in Journalist’s voice. Bringing clarity to his personal journey, 'Walk With Me' is a record filled with anecdotal teachings for navigating life."
— HipHopDX.com in 2012

HipHopDX.com gave Reporting Live a score of 3.5/5 and a positive review, praising both his delivery and lyricism. Refined Hype criticized the short length of several of tracks, but stated that "When you have an artist whose name is 'Journalist' and his project is called Reporting Live, you’re expecting music that serves as a form of journalism, and the Detroit rapper definitely makes it a priority to paint a picture of the environment around him in vivid detail."

=== 2014: Recent projects ===
As of 2014 Journalist 103 is working on his sophomore solo album. He has recently contributed to tracks by Krate Krusaders, Snowgoons, and SoulPete.

== Style ==
According to RapReviews.com, "Journalist has a hard-hitting, definitively rugged style of spitting."

"Journalist is a perfectly-titled MC because his raps have no gimmicks....but keep the listener coming back for more because they're expertly-arranged, compellingly delivered, and contain real substance."
— RapReviews.com

According to BonusCut.com, "His rhymes are laced with social, economic and political anecdotes, and are an example of why hip-hop is educative." Stated Journalist 103, "The music corporations, they manufacture music. It’s not meant to be manufactured; it’s a creative process, you have to create it. It has to come from the heart ... I never come in with trying to follow gimmicks, or just be insincere. I want the audience to feel where I come from, I want them to feel like they can relate.”

== Discography ==
=== Collaborations ===
Collaborative albums with Journalist 103
Year	Album title	Release details
2004	Unnecessary Roughness (with Mountain Climbaz)	Released: July 1, 2004; Label: Self-released; Format: digital
2010	Gas Mask (with The Left)	Released: Oct 23, 2010; Label: Mello Music Group; Format: CD, digital

=== Solo material ===
==== Albums and mixtapes ====
Studio albums and mixtapes by Journalist 103
Year	Album title	Release details
2005	K.R.A.M Movement	Released: June 1, 2005; Label: Self-released; Format: digital mixtape
2012	Reporting Live	Released: Oct 30, 2012; Label: Babygrande Records; Format: CD, digital
2016	Battle of the Hearts and Minds	Released: October 28, 2016; Label: Babygrande; Format: CD, digital

==== Singles ====
Selected songs by Journalist 103
Year	Title	Album
2004	"Da Four Horsemen" (by The Mountain Climbaz) (ft. Proof, Bizarre, Seven Daze, Royce da 5'9)	Unnecessary; Roughness
2005	"Endangered Music" (ft. Miz Korona)	K.R.A.M Movement
2010	"Gas Mask" (by The Left)	Gas Mask
2010	"Get In Where You Fit In" (by The Left)	Gas Mask
2012	"Danger" (ft. Freeway)	3-track single
2012	"Hear Me" (ft. Saigon, Fashawn)	Reporting Live
2012	"The Foundation"	Reporting Live

=== Guest appearances ===
Selected songs featuring Journalist 103
Year	Single name	Primary artist(s)	Album	Label
2002	"Broken" (ft. Journalist 103 and Mu)	Proof	Electric Coolaid Acid Testing	Iron Fist
2005	"Industry 103" (ft. Journalist 103, Animal Chief)	Strike	The Free World	United Vision
2011	"Make Moves" (ft. Journalist 103)	Astronote	Weapon Of The Future	Self-released
2012	"Detroit Makes the World Go Round" (ft. Journalist 103)	DJ Low Cut	NY Minute	Rugged
2012	"Motor City Movin'" (ft. Journalist 103, Guilty Simpson)	J.R. & PH7	The Good Life	
2012	"Listen" (ft. Journalist 103)	Krate Krusaders	When The Needle Drops Vol. 1	Self-released
2013	"Still Real And Raw" (ft. M-Dot, Jaysaun and Journalist 103)	Snowgoons	Black Snow 2	Goon MuSick
2014	"Duel Machete" (ft. Journalist 103)	SoulPete	So(ul) Raw	Etrecs.com

== See also ==
- Detroit hip hop
