= 33 and a Third =

Studio album by Def Dee
- Released: July 23, 2013
- Genre: Hip hop
- Length: 46:33
- Language: English
- Label: Mello Music Group
- Producer: Def Dee

Def Dee chronology
Cheap Heat (2011)	33 and a Third (2013)	Deja Vu (2014)

33 and a Third is the debut studio album by American record producer and rapper Def Dee. The album was released on July 23, 2013 by Mello Music Group. The album features guest appearances from Black Milk, The Black Opera, Boog Brown, Grynch, Hassaan Mackey, Jamall Bufford, John Robinson, Kenn Starr, Language Arts, Magestik Legend, Mic Phenom, OC Notes, Oddisee, Sydney Ranee, Tranqill, Uptown XO, Wise Intelligent, yU and Zar.

== Track listing ==
All songs produced by Def Dee.

No.	Title	Length
1.	"All It Takes" (featuring Magestik Legend, Jamall Bufford & Hassaan Mackey)	3:50
2.	"Numb Again" (featuring yU & Hassaan Mackey)	4:14
3.	"What The World Needs" (featuring John Robinson)	2:30
4.	"Still There" (featuring Boog Brown & yU)	2:44
5.	"Beat Interlude Won"	1:21
6.	"Drugs Outside Again" (featuring Black Milk, Mic Phenom, & Language Arts)	3:30
7.	"Lonely Eyes" (featuring Grynch & Sydney Ranee)	3:22
8.	"Fly By Night" (featuring Magestik Legend)	3:44
9.	"Beat Interlude Too"	2:06
10.	"Errybody Bent" (featuring Uptown XO)	3:08
11.	"Lightning I'm Igniting" (featuring Wise Intelligent & Zar)	2:19
12.	"Beat Interlude Tree" (featuring OC Notes)	1:20
13.	"Still Propa" (featuring Oddisee & Tranqill)	3:08
14.	"MASHed" (featuring The Black Opera)	2:27
15.	"Coke N Da Canine" (featuring Kenn Starr)	4:02
16.	"Beat Quatro"	1:42
17.	"Definitely Dee"	1:06

== Personnel ==
Credits for 33 and a Third adapted from AllMusic.

- Def Dee – primary artist
- Magestik Legend – featured artist
- Jamall Bufford – featured artist
- Hassaan Mackey – featured artist
- yU – featured artist
- John Robinson – featured artist
- Boog Brown – featured artist
- Black Milk – featured artist
- Mic Phenom – featured artist
- Language Arts – featured artist
- Grynch – featured artist
- Sydney Ranee – featured artist
- Uptown XO – featured artist
- Wise Intelligent – featured artist
- Zar – featured artist
- OC Notes – featured artist
- Oddisee – featured artist
- Tranqill – featured artist
- The Black Opera – featured artist
- Kenn Starr – featured artist
- Michael Tolle – executive producer
- Def Dee – producer
- Eric Morgeson – mastering
