= Clouds (Apollo Brown album) =

Studio album by Apollo Brown
- Released: February 22, 2011
- Genre: Instrumental hip-hop
- Length: 50:24
- Label: Mello Music Group
- Producer: Apollo Brown

Apollo Brown chronology
The Reset (2010)	Clouds (2011)	The Color Brown Part II (2012)

Clouds is the third studio album by Detroit-based hip-hop producer Apollo Brown, released on February 22, 2011, by Mello Music Group. Upon its release, Clouds received mixed reviews from music critics. Despite that, it ended up being Apollo Brown's highest-selling album and the one he considers the most important in his career.

== Recording ==
Apollo Brown recorded Clouds using his unorthodox hardware setup: a computer with Cool Edit Pro audio editor, described by MTV as "almost archaic", blown speakers and a keyboard with only 16 working keys. The artist admits that he'd tried using newer and bigger studio equipment but ultimately returned to his usual setup, which he used for more than a decade, as he's more familiar with it and as it allows him to keep his signature sound.

== Critical reception ==
Professional ratings
Review scores
Source	Rating
HipHopDX	3/5 stars
RapReviews	9/10

Clouds received mixed reviews from critics. Roman Cooper of HipHopDX gave the album three out of five, saying that it was "more akin to a beat tape than an album". Mike Baber of RapReviews gave the album nine out of ten and called it "a very impressive and thoroughly enjoyable effort", noting that "album's sheer range and variety of songs is remarkable".

== Legacy ==
According to Apollo Brown, Clouds was a "pretty big success". As of 2022, it's his highest-selling album. He considers Clouds to be the most important album of his career. In an interview with The Source magazine Apollo Brown also said that his fans loved the album and always asked him to make another instrumental album. Reluctantly, in 2014 he released Thirty Eight, a more minimalistic, "grimy noir" album. In 2022 Apollo Brown released another instrumental album, This Must Be the Place, which he describes as "a continuation of the celebrated Clouds and a departure from it".

== Track listing ==
No.	Title	Length
1.	"Sound Of Guns"	1:18
2.	"Blue Ruby"	2:03
3.	"Never In A Million Years"	2:14
4.	"Balance"	2:14
5.	"The Eleventh Hour"	2:03
6.	"Wisdom"	0:45
7.	"Black Pearls"	2:04
8.	"Shoot The Heart"	2:14
9.	"Push"	2:14
10.	"One Chance"	2:09
11.	"Human Existence"	0:43
12.	"Know The Time"	2:05
13.	"Heirloom"	2:16
14.	"Seed Of Memory"	2:11
15.	"Bridge Through Time"	2:12
16.	"Just Walk"	0:33
17.	"Shadows Of Grief"	2:08
18.	"Time Passed Autumn"	2:18
19.	"Choices"	2:11
20.	"Father And Son"	2:09
21.	"A Conscious Breath"	0:50
22.	"Drinking Life"	2:12
23.	"Imagination"	2:17
24.	"Tao Te Ching"	2:11
25.	"Heart Of Glass"	2:14
26.	"The Baghdad Sun"	2:03
27.	"A Day's End"	0:36
Total length:		50:24

7″ bonus tracks
No.	Title	Length
28.	"The Times" (featuring Oddisee)	02:47
29.	"Heirlooms" (featuring Has-Lo)	02:16

== Personnel ==
Credits are adapted from the album's liner notes.

- Apollo Brown – production, mixing, arrangement
- Kyle Murdock – mastering
- Michael Tolle – executive producer
- Jeff Conham – artwork
