= Mona Lisa (Apollo Brown and Joell Ortiz album) =

Studio album by Apollo Brown and Joell Ortiz
- Released: October 26, 2018
- Studio: The Village Caverns
- Genre: Hip-hop
- Length: 35:57
- Label: Mello Music Group
- Producer: Apollo Brown

Apollo Brown chronology
No Question (2018)	Mona Lisa (2018)	Sincerely, Detroit (2019)

Joell Ortiz chronology
That's Hip Hop (2016)	Mona Lisa (2018)	Gorilla Glue (2019)

Professional ratings
Review scores
Source	Rating
Albumism	4/5 stars
AllMusic	4/5 stars
HipHopDX	4.1/5
Pitchfork	6.7/10

Mona Lisa is a collaborative studio album by American hip-hop record producer Apollo Brown and rapper Joell Ortiz. It was released on October 26, 2018, via Mello Music Group. Recording sessions took place at the Village Caverns in Lathrup Village, Michigan. Produced entirely by Brown, it features guest appearances from Royce da 5'9" and DJ Los.

The album debuted at number 29 on the Billboard Independent Albums chart in the United States and number 25 on the Official Hip Hop and R&B Albums Chart in the United Kingdom. It was reissued on November 24, 2023, as '5th Anniversary Edition' with different cover art and three bonus songs.

On August 22, 2018, Detroit hip-hop record producer Apollo Brown and Brooklyn rapper Joell Ortiz announced a collaborative album entitled Mona Lisa, revealing release date and premiered a song off of the upcoming project, "Decisions", exclusively via Billboard. Music videos were released for the songs "Cocaine Fingertips" and "Grace of God" in November 2018.

== Track listing ==
All tracks are written by Joell Ortiz and Erik Vincent Stephens, except track 9 written with Ryan Montgomery.

No.	Title	Length
1.	"Brushstrokes"	0:44
2.	"Reflection"	3:52
3.	"My Block"	3:43
4.	"Cocaine Fingertips"	3:09
5.	"Grace of God" (featuring DJ Los)	3:51
6.	"That Place"	3:35
7.	"Word..."	3:39
8.	"Decisions"	3:21
9.	"Timberlan'd Up" (featuring Royce da 5'9")	3:29
10.	"Come Back Home"	3:45
11.	"Mona Lisa"	2:49
Total length:		35:57

Bonus track
No.	Title	Length
12.	"Timberlan'd Up RMX" (featuring Royce da 5'9" and Kxng Crooked)	4:41

Mona Lisa (5th Anniversary Edition)
No.	Title	Length
1.	"Brushstrokes"	0:44
2.	"Reflection"	3:52
3.	"My Block"	3:43
4.	"Cocaine Fingertips"	3:09
5.	"Grace of God"	3:51
6.	"That Place"	3:36
7.	"Word..."	3:39
8.	"Flashback"	3:17
9.	"Decisions"	3:21
10.	"Timberlan'd Up" (featuring Royce da 5'9")	3:29
11.	"Come Back Home"	3:45
12.	"Mona Lisa"	2:49
13.	"Master Peace"	3:40
14.	"About It"	3:24
15.	"Timberlan'd Up (Alternate)" (featuring KXNG Crooked & Royce da 5'9")	4:41

== Personnel ==
- Joell Ortiz – lyrics, vocals
- Ryan "Royce da 5'9"" Montgomery – lyrics & vocals (track 9)
- Carlos "DJ Los" Small – scratches (track 5)
- Erik Vincent "Apollo Brown" Stephens – songwriter, producer, arranger
- Tate McBroom – recording
- Magnetic – mixing
- Eric Morgeson – mastering
- Michael Tolle – executive producer
- Joey Dion – artwork
- Austin "L'Orange" Hart – graphic design

== Charts ==
Chart (2018)	Peak position
UK R&B Albums (Official Charts)	25
US Independent Albums (Billboard)	29
