= Chester Watson =

Chester Watson may refer to:

- Chester Watson (bass-baritone) (1911–1979), American opera singer
- Chester Watson (cricketer) (born 1938), Jamaican cricketer
- Chester Watson (rapper), American rapper
