= Anchovies (album) =

Studio album by Apollo Brown & Planet Asia
- Released: August 25, 2017
- Recorded: Village Caverns (Lathrup Village, MI)
- Genre: Hip-hop
- Length: 48:45
- Label: Mello Music Group
- Producer: Apollo Brown

Apollo Brown & Planet Asia chronology
Anchovies (2017)	Sardines (2023)

Apollo Brown chronology
The Easy Truth (2016)	Anchovies (2017)	No Question (2018)

Planet Asia chronology
Seventy Nine (2016)	Anchovies (2017)	The Golden Buddha (2018)

Anchovies is the first collaborative studio album by American DJ/record producer Apollo Brown and West Coast hip-hop recording artist Planet Asia. It was released on August 25, 2017, through Mello Music Group. Production was handled entirely by Apollo Brown, with Michael Tolle serving as executive producer. It features guest appearances from Guilty Simpson, Tri-State and Willie The Kid. The duo premiered their first song off of the project, "Dalai Lama Slang", on July 6, 2017, following-up with the song "Panties In a Jumble", which was premiered exactly a month prior to the album's release.

The album was ranked at No. 45 by ABC News list of 50 best albums of 2017.

In 2023 Anchovies was re-released with alternate cover art and two unreleased bonus tracks. The same year, a follow-up album called Sardines was dropped on September 8.

== Critical reception ==
Professional ratings
Review scores
Source	Rating
ABC News	4/5 stars
AllMusic	3.5/5 stars
Exclaim!	7/10
RapReviews	6/10

Anchovies was met with generally favourable reviews from music critics. ABC News reviewer praised the album, saying it "nicely pairs Brown's historically knowledgeable beats with Planet Asia's street-wise rhymes. Anchovies is at times a disarming collection, thick with old-school freshness" and called it "vintage hip-hop to the bone". Rajin of Extraordinary Nobodies recommended the album "to anyone who likes hip hop in any capacity, because it may offer a glimpse into a style that not as many people are exposed to, while not being a challenging listen". AllMusic's Paul Simpson wrote: "the combination of hard rhymes and soft music might come off as disconcerting to some listeners, hence the "ain't for everybody" warning near the beginning of the album, as well as its title itself, but it would seem more jarring if Brown and Asia weren't so highly skilled at their respective crafts". Themistoklis Alexis of Exclaim! found the album "carries on tradition for both producer and wordsmith".

In his mixed review for RapReviews.com, Sy Shackleford stated: "Anchovies is hurt by its experimentation in sound. Some may view Apollo’s minimalism here as doing "more with less" or adding the optimistic spin of "less is more", but neither is the case, it’s just less. While Planet Asia's lyricism certainly garners more attention, it's largely because of its coupling with production that polarizes".

=== Accolades ===
Publication	Accolade	Rank	Ref.
ABC News	Top 50 Albums of 2017	45	

== Track listing ==
No.	Title	Length
1.	"The Smell"	0:48
2.	"Panties in a Jumble"	3:25
3.	"Diamonds"	3:00
4.	"The Aura"	4:19
5.	"Dalai Lama Slang" (featuring Willie the Kid)	3:07
6.	"Tiger Bone"	3:13
7.	"Duffles"	3:35
8.	"Avant Garde"	2:57
9.	"Deep in the Casket"	3:15
10.	"Fire" (featuring TriState)	3:47
11.	"Speak Volumes"	3:08
12.	"Pain"	3:05
13.	"Get Back"	3:54
14.	"Nine Steamin'" (featuring Guilty Simpson)	2:51
15.	"You Love Me"	4:21
Total length:		48:45

Bonus tracks
No.	Title	Length
16.	"Golden Chakras"	2:59
17.	"Broke Encompass"	3:03

== Personnel ==
- Jason "Planet Asia" Green – vocals, songwriter
- Willie "Willie The Kid" Jackson – vocals & songwriter (track 5)
- Donti "Tri State" Ceruti – vocals & songwriter (track 10)
- Byron "Guilty Simpson" Simpson – vocals & songwriter (track 14)
- Erik "Apollo Brown" Stephens – producer, songwriter
- Tate McBroom – recording
- Matt "Magnetic" Oleksiak – mixing
- Eric Morgeson – mastering
- Michael Tolle – executive producer
- Austin "L'Orange" Hart – graphics
