= The Life & Death of Scenery =

Studio album by L'Orange and Mr. Lif
- Released: October 14, 2016
- Genre: Hip-hop
- Length: 21:59
- Label: Mello Music Group
- Producer: L'Orange

L'Orange chronology
Time? Astonishing! (2015)	The Life & Death of Scenery (2016)	The Ordinary Man (2017)

Mr. Lif chronology
Don't Look Down (2016)	The Life & Death of Scenery (2016)	Resilient (2017)

Professional ratings
Review scores
Source	Rating
AllMusic	4/5 stars
Noisey	(1-star Honorable Mention)
PopMatters	8/10
RapReviews	8/10
Tom Hull	A−

The Life & Death of Scenery is a collaborative concept studio album by American rapper Mr. Lif and record producer L'Orange. It was released on October 14, 2016, through Mello Music Group with distribution via The Orchard and was available for free on Adult Swim website. Production was entirely handled by L'Orange, with Michael Tolle serving as executive producer. It features contributions from Akrobatik, Chester Watson, Gonjasufi, Insight, Wyatt Cenac and DJ Qbert.

The album's futuristic dystopia concept, inspired by Fahrenheit 451 and Nineteen Eighty-Four, is about a society where art has been banished.

== Track listing ==
No.	Title	Length
1.	"The Perfect World Radio Hour: Day 279"	0:33
2.	"A World Without Music"	2:23
3.	"The Scribe"	3:08
4.	"The Perfect World Radio Hour: Day 304"	0:31
5.	"Antique Gold"	2:49
6.	"The Gentle End"	2:34
7.	"The Perfect World Radio Hour: Day 341"	0:46
8.	"Strange Technology"	2:32
9.	"Five Lies About the World Outside"	3:07
10.	"The Perfect World Radio Hour: Day 421"	0:30
11.	"A Palace in the Sky"	3:06
Total length:		21:59

== Personnel ==
- Jeffrey "Mr. Lif" Haynes – vocals
- Wyatt Cenac – vocals (tracks: 1, 4, 7, 10)
- Jared "Akrobatik" Bridgeman – vocals (tracks: 3, 8)
- Chester Watson – vocals (track 5)
- Sumach "Gonjasufi" Valentine – vocals (track 8)
- Andre "Insight" Todman – vocals (track 9)
- Richard "DJ Qbert" Quitevis – scratches (track 3)
- Austin "L'Orange" Hart – producer
- Seiji Itaru Inouye – mixing
- Glenn Schick – mastering
- Michael Tolle – executive producer
- Douglas Hale – artwork
- Sarah Mattmiller – graphic design
