= Time? Astonishing! =

Studio album by L'Orange and Kool Keith
- Released: July 24, 2015
- Genre: Hip-hop
- Length: 33:23
- Label: Mello Music Group
- Producer: L'Orange; Michael Tolle (exec.)

L'Orange chronology
The Night Took Us In like Family (2015)	Time? Astonishing! (2015)	The Life & Death of Scenery (2016)

Kool Keith chronology
Teddy Bass Presents El Dorado Driven (2014)	Time? Astonishing! (2015)	A Couple of Slices (2015)

Time? Astonishing! is a collaborative studio album by American record producer L'Orange and American rapper Kool Keith. It was released via Mello Music Group on July 24, 2015. It features guest appearances from J-Live, Mr. Lif, Open Mike Eagle, Blu, Montage One, DJ Trackstar, MC Paul Barman, and MindsOne.

== Critical reception ==
Professional ratings
Review scores
Source	Rating
AllMusic	3/5 stars
HipHopDX	3.5/5
Pitchfork	6.8/10
RapReviews	8/10
Robert Christgau	(2-star Honorable Mention)

Dana Scott of HipHopDX wrote, "With L'Orange playing the part of Doc Brown to Kool Keith's Marty McFly, Time? Astonishing! has its moments that are both comforting to the cerebral and, maybe, to a stoner who has nothing else better to do than commence to star travel on a lazy afternoon." Mosi Reeves of Pitchfork stated that "One of its charms is hearing L'Orange adapt his sound to fit the mercurial Kool Keith's style." He added, "perhaps Kool Keith and L'Orange are satisfied with conjuring a mood of amusingly hallucinatory hip-hop that lasts just over 30 minutes, and then evaporates like a pleasurable high."

Under the Radar placed the album at number 10 on the "Top 15 Hip-Hop Albums of 2015" list.

== Track listing ==
No.	Title	Length
1.	"Time? Astonishing!"	1:45
2.	"The Traveler" (featuring J-Live)	2:52
3.	"The Green Ray"	2:48
4.	"Twenty Fifty Three" (featuring Mr. Lif)	3:17
5.	"Meanwhile, Back Home" (featuring Open Mike Eagle)	2:00
6.	"The Wanderer"	3:23
7.	"This New World" (featuring Blu, Montage One, and DJ Trackstar)	3:29
8.	"Dr. Bipolar"	3:12
9.	"Suspended Animation" (featuring MC Paul Barman)	1:33
10.	"I Need Out of This World" (featuring MindsOne)	2:45
11.	"Upwards. To Space!"	2:34
12.	"Days I Used to Know"	1:06
13.	"Sometimes I Feel" (bonus)	2:43
Total length:		33:23

== Personnel ==
Credits adapted from liner notes.

- L'Orange – production
- Kool Keith – vocals
- J-Live – vocals (2)
- Mr. Lif – vocals (4)
- Open Mike Eagle – vocals (5)
- Blu – vocals (7)
- Montage One – vocals (7)
- DJ Trackstar – turntables (7)
- MC Paul Barman – vocals (9)
- MindsOne – vocals (10)
- Seiji Itaru Inouye – mixing
- Eric Morgeson – mastering
- Michael Tolle – executive production
- Zach Kashkett – art direction
- Jon Webb – photography
- Rick Parker – photography
- Sarah Dalton – design
- Whitney Oppenheimer – design
