= The Easy Truth =

Studio album by Apollo Brown and Skyzoo
- Released: September 30, 2016
- Studio: Village Caverns (Lathrup Village, MI)
- Genre: Hip hop
- Length: 51:59
- Label: Mello Music Group
- Producer: Apollo Brown

Apollo Brown chronology
Grandeur (2015)	The Easy Truth (2016)	Anchovies (2017)

Skyzoo chronology
Music for My Friends (2015)	The Easy Truth (2016)	In Celebration of Us (2018)

Professional ratings
Review scores
Source	Rating
AllMusic	4/5 stars
Exclaim!	7/10
HipHopDX	4.1/5
laut.de	4/5 stars
RapReviews	7.5/10
Tom Hull	B+

The Easy Truth is a collaborative studio album by American hip hop record producer Apollo Brown and rapper Skyzoo. It was released on September 30, 2016, via Mello Music Group. Recording sessions took place at the Village Caverns in Michigan. Production was handled entirely by Apollo Brown, who also served as one of executive producers together with Michael Tolle and Skyzoo. It features guest appearances from Conway the Machine, Joell Ortiz, Patty Crash, Stalley and Westside Gunn.

The album did not reach the Billboard 200 chart, however, it peaked at No. 25 on the Top R&B/Hip-Hop Albums, No. 16 on the Top Rap Albums, No. 45 on the Independent Albums and No. 11 on the Heatseekers Albums in the United States.

The album was met with generally favourable reviews from music critics. ABC News ranked the album at No. 22 on its '50 best albums of 2016' list.

== Track listing ==
No.	Title	Length
1.	"Soapbox"	0:49
2.	"One in the Same" (featuring Patty Crash)	3:53
3.	"Jordans & a Gold Chain"	2:48
4.	"A Couple Dollars" (featuring Joell Ortiz)	4:44
5.	"Basquiat on the Draw" (featuring Conway the Machine and Westside Gunn)	4:29
6.	"The Vibes"	3:11
7.	"On the Stretch & Bob Show"	4:09
8.	"Spoils to the Victor"	2:51
9.	"Visionary Riches"	3:50
10.	"They Parked a Bentley on the Corner"	3:35
11.	"The Flyest Essence"	2:40
12.	"Innocent Ambition"	3:36
13.	"Care Packages"	2:59
14.	"Payout" (featuring Stalley)	4:24
15.	"Nodding Off"	4:01
Total length:		51:59

== Personnel ==
- Skyler "Skyzoo" Taylor – vocals, executive producer
- Katrin "Patty Crash" Newman – vocals (track 2)
- Joell Ortiz – vocals (track 4)
- Demond "Conway the Machine" Price – vocals (track 5)
- Alvin Lamar "Westside Gunn" Worthy – vocals (track 5)
- Kyle Alfonso "Stalley" Myricks – vocals (track 14)
- Erik "Apollo Brown" Stephens – producer, executive producer
- Tate McBroom – recording
- Matt "Magnetic" Oleksiak – mixing
- Eric Morgeson – mastering
- Michael Tolle – executive producer
- Kick James – photography

== Charts ==
Chart (2016)	Peak position
US Top R&B/Hip-Hop Albums (Billboard)	25
US Top Rap Albums (Billboard)	16
US Independent Albums (Billboard)	45
US Heatseekers Albums (Billboard)	11
