= The Good Fight (Oddisee album) =

Studio album by Oddisee
- Released: May 5, 2015
- Genre: Hip hop
- Length: 45:59
- Label: Mello Music Group
- Producer: Oddisee

Oddisee chronology
Tangible Dream (2013)	The Good Fight (2015)	The Iceberg (2017)

The Good Fight is a studio album by American hip hop artist Oddisee. It was released via Mello Music Group on May 5, 2015. Music videos were created for "Counter-Clockwise" and "Belong to the World".

== Critical reception ==
Professional ratings
Aggregate scores
Source	Rating
Metacritic	80/100
Review scores
Source	Rating
AllMusic	4/5 stars
The Boston Globe	favorable
Exclaim!	8/10
HipHopDX	4.5/5
Pitchfork	7.3/10

At Metacritic, which assigns a weighted average score out of 100 to reviews from mainstream critics, the album received an average score of 80, based on 8 reviews, indicating "generally favorable reviews".

Marcus J. Moore of Pitchfork gave the album a 7.3 out of 10 and stated that "The Good Fight exudes a sense of artistic freedom not heard on Oddisee's previous releases." David Jeffries of AllMusic gave the album 4 stars out of 5, calling it "inspired, infectious, and artistically grand."

In 2015, HipHopDX included it on the "30 Best Underground Hip Hop Albums Since 2000" list.

== Track listing ==
No.	Title	Length
1.	"That's Love"	4:05
2.	"Want Something Done"	3:26
3.	"Contradiction's Maze" (featuring Maimouna Youssef)	4:15
4.	"Counter-Clockwise"	3:56
5.	"First Choice"	3:47
6.	"Belong to the World"	4:26
7.	"A List of Withouts"	4:16
8.	"Book Covers" (featuring Nick Hakim)	3:24
9.	"Meant It When I Said It"	4:14
10.	"Fight Delays"	0:51
11.	"What They'll Say" (featuring Gary Clark, Jr. and Maimouna Youssef)	4:31
12.	"Worse Before Better" (featuring Tranqill)	4:45
Total length:		45:59

== Personnel ==
Credits adapted from liner notes.

- Oddisee – vocals, production, arrangement, mixing
- Maimouna Youssef – vocals (3, 11)
- Nick Hakim – vocals (8), backing vocals
- Gary Clark, Jr. – vocals (11), guitar
- Tranqill – vocals (12)
- K.A. Hezekiah – backing vocals
- Davis Fasaluku – backing vocals
- Tamba Fasaluku – backing vocals
- Ralph Washington – keyboards
- Dennis Turner – bass guitar
- Anthony Coleman – horns
- Jason Disu – horns
- Amir Mohamed – executive production
- Michael Tolle – executive production
- Brian Gardner – mastering
- Q+A – graphic design, photography
- Liz Barclay – photography
- Adrian Carter – styling

== Charts ==
Chart (2015)	Peak position
US Heatseekers Albums (Billboard)	11
US Independent Albums (Billboard)	41
US Top R&B/Hip-Hop Albums (Billboard)	33
