= Starr Status =

Studio album by Kenn Starr
- Released: August 29, 2006
- Recorded: 2004 – 2006; Reagle Beagle Studios; Olney, Maryland; Kev's Room; Landover, Maryland
- Genre: Hip-hop
- Length: 61:31
- Label: Halftooth Records
- Producers: Oddisee, Illmind, Kev Brown, M-Phazes, DJ Roddy Rod, Khrysis, Young Cee

Kenn Starr chronology
| The Starr Report (2006) | Starr Status (2006) | Square One (2015) |

Starr Status is the debut album by rapper Kenn Starr, released August 29, 2006 on Halftooth Records. The album features production from Starr's fellow Low Budget Crew members Kev Brown and Oddisee, as well as Illmind, Khrysis and DJ Roddy Rod. Album guests include Talib Kweli, Asheru, Supastition, Median and Darien Brockington. The album features the single "Against the Grain" b/w "Waitin' on You"/"Back at it Again", and the bonus track "If", Starr's 2004 debut single.

== Reviews ==
Professional ratings
Review scores
| Source | Rating |
|---|---|
| AllHipHop.com | link |
| HipHopRNBSoul.com | link |
| IGN | 7.5/10 stars |
| JIVE Magazine | link |
| Okayplayer | link |
| RapReviews.com | 6.5/10 stars |

Starr Status was met with mixed reviews from critics. JIVE Magazine praised the album, granting a 4 1/2 Star rating, stating "there shouldn’t be any argument over Kenn Starr’s status as one of thee best MCs in the game." AllHipHop.com writer Andrew Kameka commented "Starr Status remains strong thanks to his wit and exceptional delivery. His natural, almost effortless ability to wrap words around any beat placed before him makes this a memorable collection."

RapReviews.com writer Andrew Matson gave the album a humble rating, saying "he needs to hold himself to a much higher standard if he wants to make good on his potential to be a clever, emotional, mature emcee with technical skills"..."Starr Status is, to me, a frustrating listen because of what it could have been." Okayplayer.com writer Adam Roussell gave the album a moderate 3 Star rating, and criticized Starr Status for a lack of introspection, stating "Anyone who listens to Starr Status is likely to be entertained, but they are unlikely to be endeared to the artist. And that’s vital in this era where a star’s status is often gauged by the number of people who are compelled by the artist’s story."

== Track listing ==
| # | Title | Producer(s) | Writer (s) |
|---|---|---|---|
| 1 | "Starr Status (Intro)" | Oddisee | K. Jones, A. Muhammad |
| 2 | "Against the Grain" | Illmind | K. Jones, R. Ibanga, Jr. |
| 3 | "Relentless" (featuring Kev Brown) | Kev Brown | K. Jones, K. Brown |
| 4 | "The Same, Pt. 2" | Oddisee | K. Jones, A. Muhammad |
| 5 | "Mr. Nice Guy" (featuring Wayna) | Oddisee | K. Jones, A. Muhammad, W. Wondwossen |
| 6 | "Middle Fingaz" | M-Phazes | K. Jones, M. Landon |
| 7 | "U Will" | DJ Roddy Rod | K. Jones, R. Bridges |
| 8 | "Never Too Late" (featuring Sean Born) | Kev Brown | K. Jones, K. Brown |
| 9 | "Carry On" (featuring Supastition & Darien Brockington) | Oddisee | K. Jones, A. Muhammad, K. Moye, D. Brockington |
| 10 | "Waitin' on You" | Khrysis | K. Jones, C. Tyson |
| 11 | "Inside" (featuring Wayna) | Illmind | K. Jones, R. Ibanga, Jr., W. Wondwossen |
| 12 | "Back at it Again" (featuring Median & M-Phazes) | M-Phazes | K. Jones, J. Livingston, M. Landon |
| 13 | "Nothing But Time" (featuring Oddisee) | Young Cee | K. Jones, R. Thompson, A. Muhammad |
| 14 | "Another Day" (featuring Sean Born & Chronkite) | Kev Brown | K. Jones, K. Brown, S. Floyd |
| 15 | "Know Too Much (To Go Back)" | Oddisee | K. Jones, A. Muhammad |
| 16 | "If" (featuring Talib Kweli & Asheru) | Oddisee | K. Jones, G. Benn, T.K. Greene, A. Muhammad |

== Album singles ==
Single information
"If"
- Released: 2004
- B-Side: "Walk the Walk" (non-album track)
"Against the Grain"
- Released: July 18, 2006
- B-Side: "Waitin' on You", "Back at it Again"

== Personnel ==
- Recording engineer: Oddisee, Kev Brown
- Mixing: Illmind, Oddisee, Kev Brown, DJ Roddy Rod, M-Phazes, Dave "Superstar" Dar
- Mastering: Tom Brick
- Executive producer: David Schrager, Kenn Starr
- Photography: Jati Lindsay
- Art direction & design: Heinz
