= The Night Took Us In like Family =

Studio album by L'Orange and Jeremiah Jae
- Released: April 21, 2015
- Genre: Hip-hop, jazz rap
- Length: 44:08
- Label: Mello Music Group
- Producer: L'Orange; Michael Tolle (exec.)

L'Orange and Jeremiah Jae chronology
The Night Took Us In like Family (2015)	Complicate Your Life with Violence (2019)

Jeremiah Jae chronology
Rawhyde (2013)	The Night Took Us In like Family (2015)	Daffi (2018)

L'Orange chronology
The Orchid Days (2014)	The Night Took Us In like Family (2015)	Time? Astonishing! (2015)

The Night Took Us In like Family is the first collaborative studio album by American record producer L'Orange and American rapper Jeremiah Jae. It was released via Mello Music Group on April 21, 2015. It features guest appearances from Gift of Gab and Homeboy Sandman.

== Critical reception ==
Professional ratings
Review scores
Source	Rating
AllMusic	3.5/5 stars
HipHopDX	3.5/5
Pitchfork	7.1/10
PopMatters	8/10 stars
RapReviews	7/10
Robert Christgau	A−

Tim Sendra of AllMusic wrote: "Whether it's a one-off or the start of a beautiful relationship, Jae and L'Orange sound made for each other and this collaboration is first-rate hip-hop storytelling." Anupa Mistry of Pitchfork described the album as "an aesthetic concept record (billed, cringingly, as 'noir hop') that teasingly ponders the idea of gangster rap from another era—pre-Scarface, for once."

== Track listing ==
No.	Title	Length
1.	"Part One: Introducing a Conspicuous Man"	1:08
2.	"Do My Best to Carry On"	3:03
3.	"Ice Obsidian"	1:52
4.	"The Underworld"	3:27
5.	"All I Need" (featuring Gift of Gab)	2:50
6.	"Part Two: God Complex"	1:46
7.	"The Concrete Some Call Home"	2:45
8.	"Ignore the Man to Your Right" (featuring Homeboy Sandman)	2:59
9.	"Taken by the Night"	3:09
10.	"Part Three: The Damning"	1:57
11.	"The Lineup"	2:10
12.	"Kicking Glass"	2:04
13.	"Kind of Like Life"	2:36
14.	"Part Four: Revenge & Escape"	1:33
15.	"I Was Invisible Nothing"	3:05
16.	"Death Valley"	2:26
17.	"Starry Eyed Balcony Walkers"	3:49
18.	"Part Five: Macabre"	1:30
Total length:		44:08

== Personnel ==
Credits adapted from liner notes.

- L'Orange – production
- Jeremiah Jae – vocals
- Gift of Gab – vocals (5)
- Homeboy Sandman – vocals (8)
- Michael Tolle – executive production
