= Che Noir =

American rapper (born 1994)

- Born: Marche Lashawn; Buffalo, New York, United States
- Genre: East Coast hip-hop
- Occupations: Rapper, record producer
- Website: che-noir.com

Marche Lashawn, known professionally as Che Noir or Ché Noir, is an American rapper and record producer from Buffalo, New York.

== Early life ==
Marche Lashawn was born in Buffalo, New York in 1994. Lashawn began producing instrumentals at age 15 and rapping at age 16.

== Career ==
Lashawn released her debut mixtape, Poetic Thoughts, in 2016. She built a recording studio in Niagara Falls, where she met Benny the Butcher. She began collaborating with Griselda Records artists and Rochester producer 38 Spesh in 2017. She signed to 38 Spesh's Trust Comes First record label in 2018. 38 Spesh produced Lashawn's 2018 mixtape The Thrill of the Hunt and 2019 mixtape The Thrill of the Hunt 2. In 2020, she released Juno, a collaborative album with 38 Spesh, and As God Intended, a collaborative album with Detroit producer Apollo Brown. Released through Mello Music Group, As God Intended included features from Black Thought, Skyzoo, and Planet Asia. In December 2020, she released the After 12 EP, featuring Ransom, 38 Spesh, Jynx716, RJ Payne, Amber Simone, Sa-Roc, and The Musalini. She featured on 38 Spesh's December 2020 album Interstate 38. She founded her own independent record label, Poetic Movement, in 2020.

In January 2022, she released the self-produced album Food for Thought. The album featured Jynx716, 7xvethegenius, Armani Caesar, Ransom, Rome Streetz, and 38 Spesh. In July 2022, she produced Jynx716's Careful What You Wish For EP and released Poetic Sounds, a live EP. She released The Last Remnants in October 2022, with features from 38 Spesh, Ransom, Elcamino, Klass Murda, Benny the Butcher, and Jynx716. In March 2023, she released Noir or Never in collaboration with Big Ghost. The album featured Flee Lord, D-Styles, 7xvethegenius, Planet Asia, Skyzoo, Ransom, and 38 Spesh.

She released The Color Chocolate, Vol. 1, an EP featuring Ransom, Your Old Droog, Evidence, and IceColdBishop, in January 2024. She produced the Jynx716 EP Andy, released in March 2024. In October 2024, she released The Lotus Child, a self-produced EP. The album included features from Brady Watt, Abiodun Oyewole, Rapsody, 38 Spesh, Jack Davey, Bairi, and The Souly Ghost. She released Seeds in Babylon, a collaborative album with German producer Superior, in March 2025. The Color Chocolate 2, a sequel to the 2024 EP, released in June 2025 with features from Elzhi, 7xvethegenius, Evidence, and Son Little. In August 2025, she released No Validation, in collaboration with Washington, D.C. production duo The Other Guys. The album featured Jack Davey, Jae Skeese, Ransom, Skyzoo, Von Pea, DJ Eveready, and Smoke DZA. In November 2025, she released 7xvethegenius collaborative album Desired Crowns. The album featured American rapper Reason. She released the album It Takes A Village in October 2026.

== Artistry ==
Paul Simpson of AllMusic described Che Noir's music as having "strong, uncompromisingly direct lyrics" and "production inspired by mid-'90s East Coast rap." She has described DMX, Foxy Brown, Jay-Z, Tupac Shakur, and The Notorious B.I.G. as influences on her music. She predominantly uses the digital audio workstation Fruity Loops to produce music.

== Personal life ==
Lashawn's brother and uncle died in 2022, which influenced her 2024 album The Lotus Child. Lashawn opened a barber shop with her husband in Elmwood Village, Buffalo in 2022.

== Discography ==
=== Mixtapes ===
- Poetic Thoughts (2016)
- The Thrill of the Hunt (with 38 Spesh) (2018)
- The Thrill of the Hunt 2 (with 38 Spesh) (2019)

=== Extended plays ===
- After 12 (2020)
- Careful What You Wish For (with Jynx716) (2022)
- Poetic Sounds (2022)
- The Color Chocolate, Vol. 1 (2024)
- Andy (with Jynx716) (2024)
- The Lotus Child (2024)
- The Color Chocolate 2 (2025)

=== Studio albums ===
- Juno (with 38 Spesh) (2020)
- As God Intended (with Apollo Brown) (2020)
- Food for Thought (2022)
- The Last Remnants (2022)
- Noir or Never (with Big Ghost) (2023)
- Seeds in Babylon (with Superior) (2025)
- No Validation (with The Other Guys) (2025)
- Desired Crowns (with 7xvethegenius) (2025)
- It Takes A Village (2026)

== Accolades ==
List of awards and nominations
| Award | Year | Recipient(s) and nominee(s) | Category | Result | Ref. |
|---|---|---|---|---|---|
| Hollywood Independent Music Awards | 2023 | Che Noir | Adult Contemporary Hip Hop | Nominated | |
