= To What End =

Studio album by Oddisee
- Released: January 20, 2023
- Genre: Hip hop
- Label: Outer Note Label
- Producer: Oddisee

Oddisee chronology
The Iceberg (2017)	To What End (2023)

To What End is a studio album by American rapper and record producer Oddisee. It was released on January 20, 2023 through Outer Note Label. Production was handled by Oddisee himself, except for the song "Bartenders", which was co-produced by Dunc. It features guest appearances from BeMyFiasco, Bilal, C.S. Armstrong, Freeway, Haile Supreme, Kay Young, Noochie, Olivier St. Louis, Phonte, Saint Ezekiel and Toine Jameson, with contributions from Ralph Real, Dennis Turner, Jon Laine, Fredeka, Felix Herbst, Johan Lenox and Don Carn.

== Critical reception ==
Professional ratings
Aggregate scores
Source	Rating
Metacritic	75/100
Review scores
Source	Rating
AllMusic	3.5/5 stars
Pitchfork	7.4/10
PopMatters	7/10
RapReviews	8/10
Spectrum Culture	80%/100%

To What End was met with generally favorable reviews from music critics. At Metacritic, which assigns a normalized rating out of 100 to reviews from mainstream publications, the album received an average score of 75, based on four reviews.

Grant Jones of RapReviews found the album "that grows on the listener", adding: "it does have a few tracks that sound like they could have been from older albums and the shorter track lengths I can't ignore, but there are great tracks here to appease any self-respecting hip-hop fan seeking something more genuine and soulful in their 2023 playlists". Thomas Stremfel of Spectrum Culture wrote: "To What End, while an overwhelmingly positive record, explores one of his core principles from multiple angles, and for every angle he approaches from, he finds either a clever, inspiring or fun way to turn it into a song". Dylan Green of Pitchfork wrote: "a handful of the beats skew generic—closing tracks "The Way", with its sleepy Wreckx-n-Effect sample, and "Race", in particular, play like car-commercial music—but To What End avoids defaulting to a rapper spitting with a backing band". AllMusic's Paul Simpson stated: "Oddisee is a pro at boiling a whirlwind of thoughts and emotions down to concise, relatable songs, and To What End contains some of his most deeply personal work to date". Quentin B Huff of PopMatters resumed: "Oddisee more than holds his own while weaving his nimble lyricism across his diverse soundscape".

== Track listing ==
No.	Title	Writer(s)	Length
1.	"The Start of Something"	Amir Mohamed el Khalifa	3:42
2.	"How Far"	Khalifa	1:59
3.	"Many Hats"	Khalifa	3:07
4.	"Already Knew"	Khalifa	4:02
5.	"Choices" (featuring Phonte, BeMyFiasco and Kay Young)	Khalifa; Phonte Coleman; Bianca Rodriguez; Kay Young	3:42
6.	"Try Again"	Khalifa	2:47
7.	"Ghetto to Meadow" (featuring Freeway)	Khalifa; Leslie Edward Pridgen	3:14
8.	"More to Go" (featuring C.S. Armstrong)	Khalifa; Chauncy S. Armstrong	3:44
9.	"All I Need" (featuring Olivier St. Louis)	Khalifa; Olivier St. Louis	3:03
10.	"Bartenders" (featuring Toine Jameson)	Khalifa; Toine Jameson	3:15
11.	"Work to Do" (featuring Bilal)	Khalifa; Bilal Sayeed Oliver	3:00
12.	"People Watching"	Khalifa	3:14
13.	"Hard to Tell"	Khalifa	2:47
14.	"Bogarde" (featuring Noochie)	Khalifa; Noochie	2:41
15.	"The Way" (featuring Haile Supreme and Saint Ezekiel)	Khalifa; Haile Supreme; Saint Ezekiel	3:16
16.	"Race"	Khalifa	3:29

== Personnel ==
- Amir Mohamed el Khalifa (Oddisee) – vocals, producer, mixing
- Phonte Coleman – featured artist (track 5)
- Bianca "BeMyFiasco" Rodriguez – featured artist (track 5)
- Kay Young – featured artist (track 5)
- Leslie "Freeway" Pridgen – featured artist (track 7)
- Chauncy S. Armstrong – featured artist (track 8)
- Olivier St. Louis – featured artist (track 9), additional guitar
- Toine Jameson – featured artist (track 10)
- Bilal Sayeed Oliver – featured artist (track 11)
- Noochie – featured artist (track 14)
- Haile Supreme – featured artist (track 15)
- Saint Ezekiel – featured artist (track 15), additional guitar
- Ralph Real – additional keyboards
- Dennis Turner – additional bass
- Jonathan Ernest Laine – additional drums
- Fredeka – additional strings
- Felix Herbst – additional strings
- Stephen Michael "Johan Lenox" Feigenbaum – additional strings
- Don Carn – additional strings
- Hans-Philipp Graf – mastering
- Arthur Banach – artwork, design
