= People Hear What They See =

Studio album by Oddisee
- Released: June 5, 2012
- Genre: Hip-hop
- Length: 43:20
- Label: Mello Music Group
- Producer: Oddisee

Oddisee chronology
Traveling Man (2010)	People Hear What They See (2012)	The Beauty in All (2013)

People Hear What They See is a studio album by American hip-hop artist Oddisee. It was released via Mello Music Group on June 5, 2012.

== Critical reception ==
Professional ratings
Review scores
Source	Rating
BBC Music	favorable
HipHopDX	4/5 stars
Spin	favorable
Washington City Paper	mixed

Andrew Noz of Washington City Paper gave the album a mixed review, saying, "Sometimes he gets buried in the ornateness of his own beats; elsewhere, he manages to compensate with the instinctive understanding of having created them." Meanwhile, Marcus J. Moore of BBC Music commented that "With this album, Oddisee looks in the mirror and examines his own intricacies, attempting to comprehend his immediate surroundings and society as a whole." Jesse Fairfax of HipHopDX gave the album 4 stars out of 5, saying, "Technically still a product of Hip Hop as his long established penchant for fierce rapping accompanied by boom-bap rhythm is fully intact, his gradual growth towards a fleshed out vision inclusive of live instrumentation may seek transcendence that dispels confinement within a set genre." Brandon Soderberg of Spin called it "a gritty hip-hop album with detours into orchestrated soul, quiet storm, and space disco."

Homeboy Sandman named it his favorite album of 2012. Uproxx included it on the "12 Most Slept-On Albums of 2012" list. In 2014, Complex included it on the "Best One-Producer Albums of the 2000s" list.

== Track listing ==
No.	Title	Length
1.	"Ready to Rock"	4:09
2.	"Do It All" (featuring Diamond District)	3:33
3.	"That Real" (featuring Olivier Daysoul)	3:41
4.	"Let It Go" (featuring Olivier Daysoul)	4:07
5.	"American Greed"	3:23
6.	"The Need Superficial" (featuring Olivier Daysoul)	2:59
7.	"Way In Way Out"	2:46
8.	"Maybes" (featuring Ralph Real)	3:47
9.	"Anothers Grind" (featuring Tranqill)	4:20
10.	"Set You Free"	3:38
11.	"You Know Who You Are"	4:03
12.	"Think of Things"	2:54
Total length:		43:20

== Personnel ==
Credits adapted from liner notes.

- Oddisee – vocals, production, arrangement, mixing
- Diamond District – vocals (2)
- Olivier Daysoul – vocals (3, 4, 6)
- Ralph Real – vocals (8), additional instrumentation
- Tranqill – vocals (9)
- Akhil Gopal – trumpet
- Leon Cotter – saxophone
- Brian Paulding – trombone
- Will Wells – tuba
- Alex Blum – viola
- Studio A – mastering
- Michael Tolle – executive production
- D237 – design
- Jenna Foxton – photography

== Charts ==
Chart (2012)	Peak position
US Heatseekers Albums (Billboard)	31
US Top R&B/Hip-Hop Albums (Billboard)	59
