= Look What This World Did to Us =

Look What This World Did To Us

Studio album by Chris Orrick
- Released: April 7, 2015
- Genre: Hip hop
- Length: 39:13
- Language: English
- Label: Mello Music Group
- Producer: KuroiOto; L'Orange; Duke Westlake; Castle; Hir-O; Chris Orrick; Dayggs; Reed Eller

Chris Orrick chronology
Learning To Punch EP (2015)	Look What This World Did To Us (2015)	Day Drunk - EP (2015)

Singles from Look What This World Did To Us
- 1. "That's Okay" Released: March 23, 2015

Look What This World Did To Us is a studio album by Chris Orrick. Released on April 7, 2015 by Mello Music Group, it was largely well received by critics. The Canadian music publication Exclaim! wrote that the lyrics "range from deeply intimate, to unflinchingly grim, to hilariously self-deprecating, often in the same bar."

== Production and release ==
External videos
- Chris Orrick - "Ten Year Party" Music Video (April 16, 2015)
- Chris Orrick - "Rap Game Cranky" Music Video (Mar 5, 2015)

According to Chris Orrick, at the time of writing the album he'd been reading Charles Bukowski, which somewhat influenced the album's focus on "the daily grind." About the production, Chris Orrick explained that "for this particular record, I wanted things to be jazzier, more subdued, dustier. I’m a fan of sample based production but I’m really into everything at the end of the day. I like to be able to sound good on anything and I’m open to all kinds of production — I just happen to gravitate more to sample based, “boom bap” style shit." It was released on April 7, 2015 by Mello Music Group.

== Reception ==
Professional ratings
Review scores
Source	Rating
HipHopDX	3.5/5 stars

HipHopDX gave Look What This World Did To Us a positive review and a score of 3.5/5. Locash Magazine called the album "serious breakout album potential, reminiscent of Atmosphere’s Overcast, or El-P’s Fantastic Damage," and further wrote that "this album is middle class frustration rap, flipped with some dark comedy, and soaked in escapism and alcohol."

HipHopDX opined that "finding peace within the chaos of his cluttered mind, Chris Orrick is intent on controlling his various moods and presenting them to his listening audience. Always looking for a silver lining to his cloud, Chris Orrick’s sense of optimism distinguishes him as a level-headed thinker." The Canadian music publication Exclaim! wrote that the lyrics "range from deeply intimate, to unflinchingly grim, to hilariously self-deprecating, often in the same bar."

== Track listing ==
All lyrics are written by Chris Orrick

No.	Title	Producer	Length
1.	"Meh"	KuroiOto	3:46
2.	"That's Okay"	L'Orange	3:22
3.	"Rap Game Cranky"	Duke Westlake	2:57
4.	"Windows"	Castle	2:28
5.	"Kids"	Hir-O	2:28
6.	"Smoke Rings"	Chris Orrick	3:10
7.	"Leonard Letdown"	L'Orange	2:24
8.	"Blues"	Dayggs, Reed Eller	2:51
9.	"Rum & Coke"	Chris Orrick	4:57
10.	"Drown"	Hir-O	2:50
11.	"Look What This World Did To Us"	Chris Orrick	3:55
12.	"Ten Year Party"	Chris Orrick	4:05

== Personnel ==
Credits for Look What This World Did To Us adapted from AllMusic.

Managerial

- Chris Orrick – executive producer
- Michael Tolle – executive producer

Visuals and imagery

- Sarah Dalton – graphic design
- Jeremy Deputat – photography

Performance credits

- Chris Orrick – primary artist

Technical and production

- Chris Orrick – producer
- Charlie Beans – engineer, mixing
- Castle – producer
- Dayggs – producer
- Reed Eller – producer
- Hir-O – producer
- KuroiOto – producer
- Eric Morgeson – mastering
- L'Orange – producer
- Duke Westlake – producer
