= The Iceberg (Oddisee album) =

Studio album by Oddisee
- Released: February 24, 2017
- Genre: Hip hop
- Length: 47:56
- Label: Mello Music Group
- Producer: Oddisee

Oddisee chronology
The Good Fight (2015)	The Iceberg (2017)	To What End (2023)

The Iceberg is a studio album by American hip hop artist Oddisee. It was released via Mello Music Group on February 24, 2017. It is the official follow-up to his 2015 album, The Good Fight. It features guest appearances from Toine and Olivier St. Louis. Music videos were created for "NNGE" and "You Grew Up".

== Critical reception ==
Professional ratings
Aggregate scores
Source	Rating
Metacritic	82/100
Review scores
Source	Rating
AllMusic	4/5 stars
Exclaim!	8/10
HipHopDX	4.0/5
Pitchfork	7.0/10
Spectrum Culture	4.5/5 stars
XXL	XL

At Metacritic, which assigns a weighted average score out of 100 to reviews from mainstream critics, the album received an average score of 82, based on 5 reviews, indicating "universal acclaim".

Riley Wallace of Exclaim! gave the album an 8 out of 10, saying, "One of his ultimate strengths is his unique ability to make topics that aren't wholly original become something unique and distinctively his own." Kyle Eustice of HipHopDX gave the album a 4.0 out of 5 and commented that "Aside from his dynamic, thought provoking lyrics, the carefully crafted compositions are in a league of their own." Elias Leight of Pitchfork gave the album a 7.0 out of 10 and described it as "a focused beam of hip-hop soul that rattles loudly in our present political moment."

=== Accolades ===
Publication	Accolade	Rank	Ref.
Stereogum	50 Best Albums of 2017	41	
HipHopDX	Best Rap Albums of 2017	16	

== Track listing ==
No.	Title	Length
1.	"Digging Deep"	3:24
2.	"Things"	3:39
3.	"Built by Pictures"	3:56
4.	"Hold It Back"	4:06
5.	"You Grew Up"	5:05
6.	"NNGE" (featuring Toine)	3:51
7.	"Like Really"	3:44
8.	"Want to Be"	4:50
9.	"This Girl I Know"	3:37
10.	"Waiting Outside"	3:33
11.	"Rain Dance"	3:52
12.	"Rights & Wrongs" (featuring Olivier St. Louis)	3:58
Total length:		47:56

== Personnel ==
Credits adapted from liner notes.

- Oddisee – vocals, production, arrangement, mixing
- Toine – vocals (6)
- Olivier St. Louis – vocals (12), backing vocals, guitar
- Ralph Real – backing vocals, keyboards
- Dennis Turner – bass guitar
- Jason Disu – trombone
- Amir Mohamed – executive production
- Michael Tolle – executive production
- Daniel Luedtke – executive production
- Ahmed Akasha – design
- Antoine Lyers – photography

== Charts ==
Chart (2017)	Peak position
US Heatseekers Albums (Billboard)	13
US Independent Albums (Billboard)	29
