= Marlowe (rap duo) =

Rap duo with L'Orange and Solemn Brigham

Marlowe is a rap duo composed of L'Orange and Solemn Brigham.

== Background ==
Marlowe is a rap duo composed of L'Orange and Solemn Brigham. The duo is known for old-school hip-hop and a heavy use of sampling. Songs often begin with snippets from old films. In 2022, the duo had 100,000 monthly listeners on Spotify, with 3 million total listens to their debut album, and a following in both the United States and the United Kingdom. Their music has been featured in video games such as NBA 2K22 and Fortnite as well as commercials for Gatorade and 7-Eleven. The Gatorade commercial features their track titled "Future Power Sources" off their 2020 sophomore album. The duo toured in the UK in 2020. Pitchfork selected the track "Godfist" as a highlight of their third self-titled album.

== Discography ==
=== Studio albums ===
- Marlowe (2018)
- Marlowe 2 (2020)
- Marlowe 3 (2022)

=== Guest appearances ===
- Mello Music Mode – "One of the last" from Bushido (2021)
- Tony Allen – "My own" There Is No End (2021)
- Solemn Brigham – "The Lore" from South Sinner Street (2021)
- Namir Blade – "Pipe Dream" from Imaginary Everything (2021)
- Mello Music Group – "Last Reserve" from Omakase (2023)
