= Thirty Eight =

Studio album by Apollo Brown
- Released: April 29, 2014
- Studio: Studio A, Detroit; The Disc, Detroit
- Genre: Instrumental hip-hop
- Length: 65:20
- Label: Mello Music Group
- Producer: Apollo Brown; Michael Tolle (exec.)

Apollo Brown chronology
Abrasions: Stitched Up (with Planet Asia) (2014)	Thirty Eight (2014)	Ugly Heroes EP (with Verbal Kent and Red Pill) (2014)

Singles from Thirty Eight
- 1. "The Answer" Released: March 25, 2014

Thirty Eight is the fourth studio album by Detroit-based hip-hop producer Apollo Brown, released digitally on April 29, 2014 by Mello Music Group. The album was later released physically, on CD and vinyl, with their own bonus tracks. Apollo Brown described Thirty Eight as a ride through Detroit of the early 1980s, that was inspired by various 1970s and 1980s films' soundtracks. One single was released from the album, "The Answer", as a preorder bonus.

== Album title ==
According to Apollo Brown, the album was named after .38 caliber revolver:

The original title to the album was Pop's Revolver. I started calling it Thirty Eight just to be a little bit more straight to the point. I call it Thirty Eight because a .38 caliber revolver or weapon in general, at its peak and in its prime, was probably the most used, sought after, and reliable caliber of its kind. A .38 was police-issue. Every cop in the United States used a .38. The .38 was that old gun in your grandma’s purse. The .38 was also that old, trusty gun that was in the shoebox in your grandpa's closet. When all else fails, when everything jams, you can always trust that .38. You can always go to that good, old, trusty, reliable .38. It will always work for you. It will always fire. That’s why I call it Thirty Eight.

== Critical reception ==
Professional ratings
Review scores
Source	Rating
Exclaim!	7/10
PopMatters	7/10 stars

Thirty Eight received positive reviews from music critics. Exclaim! gave the album seven out of ten, saying that the album "carries an inference to the smoky, gritty sound of '70s soul while updating it with modernized production and hip-hop soul sensibilities" and commending Apollo Brown, who "gets better each time out". PopMatters also gave it seven out of ten, calling it "another win for Brown", but named lack of rappers as album's biggest weakness. "These beats are crying out for rappers," added the critic.

== Track listing ==
No.	Title	Length
1.	"Thirty Eight"	1:07
2.	"Cellophane"	2:48
3.	"Learn The Meaning"	3:12
4.	"Shotguns In Hell"	2:52
5.	"Dirt On The Ground"	3:00
6.	"The Warning"	3:07
7.	"Cleo's Apartment"	3:25
8.	"Sweet Revival"	3:07
9.	"Life Is A Wheel"	3:12
10.	"Black Suits"	2:56
11.	"Never Disappear"	2:46
12.	"The Laughter Faded"	2:49
13.	"All You Know"	2:56
14.	"Strange Things"	3:20
15.	"Heaven At Last"	3:10
16.	"Lonely and Cold"	3:01
17.	"A Wise Man's Woman"	3:05
18.	"Felonious"	3:00
19.	"Weight In Gold"	3:00
20.	"The Answer"	3:27

CD version bonus tracks
No.	Title	Length
1.	"Lonely & Cold" (featuring Roc Marciano)	3:08
2.	"Shotguns In Hell" (featuring Roc Marciano)	2:52

Vinyl version bonus tracks
No.	Title	Length
1.	"Hey Joe"	3:03
2.	"Make Bread"	3:05

== Personnel ==
Credits adapted from Bandcamp:

- Apollo Brown – producer
- Michael Tolle – executive producer
- Matt "Magnetic" Oleksiak – mixing
- Eric Morgeson – mastering
- Sarah Mattmiller – design
- Austin Hart – creative director
- Corey Sheridan – digital advisor
- Joe Dent – physical advisor
- Matt Conaway – media advisor
