= Trophies (Apollo Brown and O.C. album) =

Studio album by Apollo Brown & O.C.
- Released: May 1, 2012
- Genre: Hip-hop
- Length: 54:57
- Label: Mello Music Group
- Producer: Apollo Brown

Apollo Brown & O.C. chronology
The Color Brown Part II (2012)	Trophies (2012)	Dice Game (with Guilty Simpson) (2012)

Professional ratings
Review scores
Source	Rating
Exclaim!	(favorable)
HipHopDX	4/5 stars
Potholes in My Blog	4.5/5 stars
RapReviews	(10/10)

Trophies is a collaborative studio album by Detroit, Michigan producer Apollo Brown and D.I.T.C. member O.C. It was released by Mello Music Group in 2012.

== Track listing ==
All music is composed by Apollo Brown.

No.	Title	Length
1.	"Trophies"	0:39
2.	"The Pursuit"	3:55
3.	"Prove Me Wrong"	3:57
4.	"Nautica"	3:55
5.	"Anotha One"	4:18
6.	"Disclaimer"	2:48
7.	"We the People"	4:11
8.	"Signs"	2:00
9.	"The First 48"	4:03
10.	"Angels Sing"	4:02
11.	"Just Walk"	4:10
12.	"The Formula"	3:49
13.	"People's Champ"	4:08
14.	"Options"	3:10
15.	"Caught Up"	3:39
16.	"Fantastic"	2:13
