= Dice Game (album) =

Studio album by Apollo Brown & Guilty Simpson
- Released: November 6, 2012
- Recorded: 2012
- Studio: LabCabInRoyalOak (Royal Oak, Michigan)
- Genre: Hip-hop
- Length: 50:29
- Label: Mello Music Group
- Producer: Michael Tolle (exec.); Apollo Brown

Apollo Brown chronology
Trophies (2012)	Dice Game (2012)	Ugly Heroes (2013)

Guilty Simpson chronology
Random Axe (2011)	Dice Game (2012)	Highway Robbery (2013)

Singles from Dice Game
- 1. "Truth Be Told" Released: October 25, 2012; 2. "Reputation" Released: November 7, 2012

Dice Game is a collaborative studio album by Detroit-based producer Apollo Brown and rapper Guilty Simpson. It was released online independently under hip-hop label Mello Music Group on November 6, 2012, in digital format, and physical copies were made available on November 13, 2012. Recording sessions for Dice Game took place at LabCabInRoyalOak in Royal Oak, Michigan by Tate McBroom. The album was mixed at The Disc by Magnetic, and was mastered at Studio A by Eric Morgeson in 2012. The record was entirely produced and arranged by Apollo Brown, and features guest appearances from Torae and Planet Asia. The album was preceded by Apollo Brown & O.C.'s Trophies (2012).

== Critical reception ==
Professional ratings
Review scores
Source	Rating
HipHopDX	4/5 stars
iHipHop	5/5 stars
iStandardProducers	4/5 stars
Potholes In My Blog	4.5/5 stars
RapReviews	8/10 stars

Dice Game was met with critical acclaim from music critics. Jake Paine of HipHopDX gave the album a four out of five, saying: "Like its title and theme, Dice Game lives in the alley beside the club. It's for those in the know, and want an album that sounds great on the go. Guilty Simpson doesn't attempt any lyrical acrobatics, but rather pulls up a chair with a drink, and tells stories about his life, about his city and about the things he likes. It's simple, but it's highly effective. For the second time this year, Apollo Brown teams up with a veteran emcee associated with great production, and he thrives." Francisco McCurry of Potholes In My Blog gave the album a 4.5 out of five, saying: "Dice Game is about describing rap as a life choice: an unforgiving game of chance that reaps powerful spiritual benefits and insights, but leaves one stressed and weary. Therefore, with Guilty and Apollo fully understanding their strengths as rapper and producer, the songs on the album have an empowered quality. Sure at times the album's tone seems to monotonously bleed from one song to the next and Guilty is not everybody's cup of tea stylistically or technically, but that doesn't derail the album’s forceful momentum."

Regan Flynn of iHipHop gave the album a five out of five, saying: "Presence of the tambourine, flute, organ, violin, cello, piano, and throwback samples like the Temptations' 'Let Your Hair Down' indicate this album is as underground as they come. They just don't make [them] like this much anymore, because most of today's artists follow a very specific and disappointing formula that is a complete departure from what hip-hop used to be – music for and from the heart of the street. After a hiatus a few years ago, Apollo decided to rededicate himself to producing music, and aspired to become a household name in the realm of hip-hop. I'm not sure if that dream will come true, but teaming up with Simpson, who 'wants to make the consumer care about the music again,' is definitely a win for them as well as us." Patrick Taylor of RapReviews gave the album an eight out of ten, saying: "Kendrick Lamar attempted to reinvent gangsta rap on his excellent good kid, m.A.A.d. city. This ain't that kind of album. Instead, Apollo Brown and Guilty Simpson refine and perfect gangsta rap on [Dice Game]. There is a self-awareness and sense of consequences that is missing from an artist like Chief Keef, and the beats show a craftmanship that you don't get from your average street rap mixtape. This is grown man gangsta music, beautifully executed."

== Track listing ==
All music is composed by Apollo Brown.

No.	Title	Writer(s)	Length
1.	"Freezing Dice"	Byron Simpson	00:21
2.	"Reputation"	B. Simpson	03:11
3.	"Let's Play"	B. Simpson	03:13
4.	"One Man"	B. Simpson	03:28
5.	"I Can Do No Wrong"	B. Simpson	03:21
6.	"Potatoes" (featuring Torae)	B. Simpson, Torae Carr	02:51
7.	"Change"	B. Simpson	03:14
8.	"Dear Jane"	B. Simpson	03:17
9.	"Lose You"	B. Simpson	03:02
10.	"Ink Blotches"	B. Simpson	03:04
11.	"Neverending Story"	B. Simpson	03:15
12.	"The Cook Up"	B. Simpson	03:46
13.	"Truth Be Told"	B. Simpson	03:26
14.	"Nasty" (featuring Planet Asia)	B. Simpson, Jason Green	03:44
15.	"Wrong Hand"	B. Simpson	03:18
16.	"How Will I Go"	B. Simpson	03:58
Total length:			50:29

Deluxe edition bonus tracks
No.	Title	Writer(s)	Length
17.	"Parkour"	B. Simpson	02:52
18.	"Duckin' Strays"	B. Simpson	01:41
Total length:			55:02

== Personnel ==
Credits for Dice Game adapted from AllMusic, and the album liner notes.

- Apollo Brown — primary artist, arranger, producer
- Byron "Guilty Simpson" Simpson — primary artist, vocals
- Torae "Torae" Carr — featured artist
- Jason "Planet Asia" Green — featured artist
- Magnetic — mixing
- Tate McBroom — engineer
- Eric Morgeson — mastering
- Michael Tolle — executive producer

== Charts ==
Chart (2012)	Peak position
US Top Heatseekers Albums	39
US Top R&B/Hip-Hop Albums	201

== Release history ==
Physical releases

Region	Date	Label	Format	Edition	Catalog	Ref.
United States	November 13, 2012	Mello Music Group	CD	Standard	MMG 032CD	
United States	December 11, 2012	Mello Music Group	2xLP Vinyl	Standard	MMG 032LP	
United States	December 11, 2012	Mello Music Group	2xLP + 7" Vinyl	Deluxe	MMG 032DLX	
