= Verbal Kent =

American rapper

- Born: Dan Weiss; July 22, 1978 (age 48); Chicago, Illinois
- Genre: Hip-hop
- Occupation: Rapper
- Years active: 1999–present
- Labels: Gravel Records, Rap Mechanics, Mello Music Group
- Website: verbalkent.com

Dan Weiss (born July 22, 1978), better known by his stage name Verbal Kent, is an American alternative hip-hop artist from Chicago.

== Early life ==
Weiss was born and raised in Chicago's Rogers Park neighborhood. He started writing at the age of 15, and later attended Columbia College Chicago as a music major.

== Career ==
=== Organic Mind Unit ===
In 1999, Weiss dropped out of college and founded Organic Mind Unit, a live hip-hop band that performed in Chicago. Early versions of the group included eight rappers, with Weiss as the drummer. After he showed other OMU members some of his writing, they encouraged him to start rapping. He took on the moniker Verbal Kent, based on Roger “Verbal” Kint, the con artist played by Kevin Spacey in the 1995 film The Usual Suspects, who makes up a story based on his surroundings – a story that takes on a different meaning upon repeat viewings of the film. Weiss has said that he aspires to this sort of depth in his rhymes.

=== Solo work ===
In 2003, Kent released his first recording, the 12-inch single “Alien Rock” on Gravel Records. The single was included on his solo full-length debut, What Box, which appeared the next year. He followed it up with Move With the Walls in 2006. The album also had a single, “Dead Serious” which featured Ill Bill and Lance Ambu.

Fist Shaking, Kent's third album, came out in 2008. His sixth solo release, 2011's Save Yourself, features contributions from Masta Ace, Sadat X, Ed O.G. and One Be Lo, and production from Pete Rock, Marco Polo and !llmind. Sound of the Weapon, released in February 2014, was produced by Khrysis and given a rating of 4.0 (out of 5) by Hip Hop DX. His seventh solo album, Anesthesia, was released on September 11, 2015, and given a rating of 6.0 out of 10 by Pitchfork.

=== Other collaborations ===
In 2006, Kent formed a crew of battle rappers going by the name Giraffe Nuts. The final group was composed of ten rappers: Kent, Rusty Chains, Lance Ambu, Alltruisms, Roadblok, Doomsday, Encyclopedia Brown, Moodswangz, Kang the Konquorer and Elfamail. They released an album, Eat Them, in 2007.

In 2013, Kent, Detroit emcee Red Pill and producer Apollo Brown formed Ugly Heroes, releasing their self-titled debut in May 2013. The album examines the harsh realities of the members' hometowns. Their second studio album, Everything in Between, was released on June 24, 2016.

== Knifing incident ==
In 2003, walking down an empty alley near Clark and Pratt in Chicago with an acquaintance, the acquaintance slashed Kent's throat with a knife, missing his jugular by less than a centimeter. Kent managed to run to his car, and drove himself to Saint Francis Hospital in Evanston as blood poured from his neck. He received nearly 100 stitches, and took two months to recuperate. No arrests were made, and the reason for the attack remains unknown.

== Discography ==
=== Albums ===
- What Box (2004, Gravel Records)
- Move With the Walls (2006, Gravel Records)
- Fist Shaking (2008, Molemen Records)
- Brave New Rap – with Kaz1 (2009, Gravel Records)
- Save Your Friends (2010, Bare vs Deer)
- Save Yourself (2011, Rap Mechanics)
- Ugly Heroes – with Apollo Brown & Red Pill (2013, Mello Music Group)
- Sound of the Weapon (2014, Mello Music Group)
- Anesthesia (2015, Mello Music Group)
- Everything in Between – with Apollo Brown & Red Pill (2016, Mello Music Group)
- Weight Of Your World – with !llMind (2016, Mello Music Group)
- Dueling Experts – with Recognize Ali (2020, Mello Music Group)

=== Appears on ===
- Organic Mind Unit – Organic Mind Unit (1999, Eyes Wide Open)
- Unusual Suspects – Organic Mind Unit (2000, Eyes Wide Open)
- Eat Them – Giraffe Nuts (2007, Bare vs Deer / Gravel Records)
- Supervivencia ft Hijo Prodigo - El Cerebro (Brainiac Beats) "Simbiosis" (2007, Gris Materia Records)
- Waiting 2 Die – Lantz (2012, 631 Recordz)

=== Singles ===
- “Alien Rock” (2003 – from What Box)
- “Dead Serious” (2006 – from Move With the Walls)
- "September" (2015 - from Anesthesia)

=== Mixtapes ===
- Beat Trotterz Mixtape Volume 1, Starring: Verbal Kent (mixed by Lord Faz) (2009, Beat Trotterz)
