= Oddisee =

American rapper and producer (born 1985)

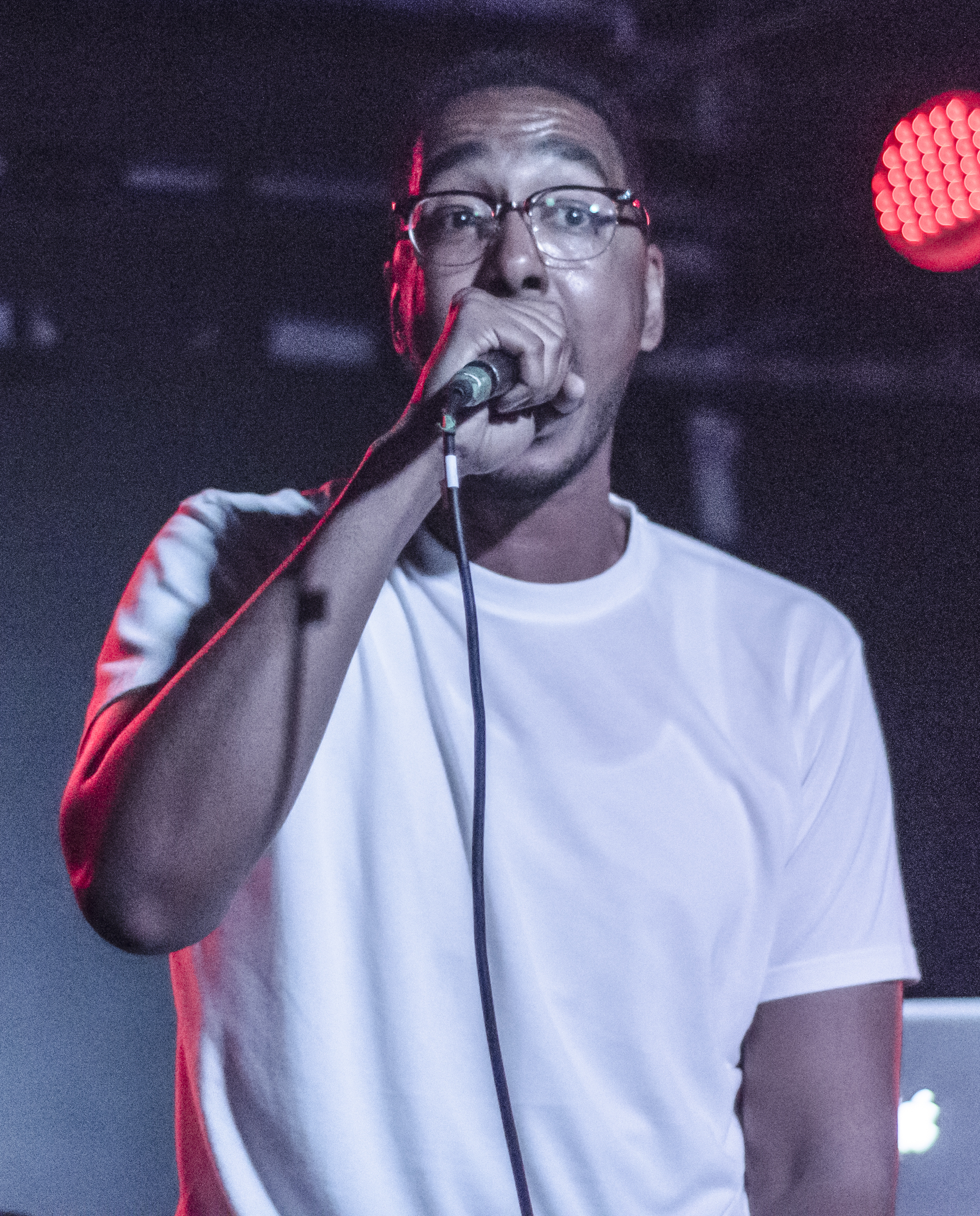
- Oddisee performing live

Background information
- Born: Amir Mohamed el Khalifa; February 24, 1985 (age 41); Washington, D.C., U.S.
- Origin: Largo, Maryland, U.S.
- Genre: Hip-hop
- Occupations: Rapper; record producer
- Years active: 1999–present
- Labels: Halftooth Records; Mello Music Group; Oddisee Music; All City Records; Outer Note Label
- Website: oddisee.bandcamp.com

Amir Mohamed el Khalifa (born on February 24, 1985), better known by his stage name Oddisee, is an American rapper and record producer from Washington, D.C. He is one third of the hip-hop trio Diamond District. He was also part of the Low Budget Crew. He is based in Brooklyn, New York.

== Early life ==
Oddisee was born to an African-American mother and a Sudanese father, at Howard University Hospital in Washington, D.C. He was raised by his stepmother (who was also Sudanese) and father. He grew up in Silver Spring, Maryland, as well as Prince George's County, Maryland. He moved back to Washington, D.C. after high school.

== Career ==
In 2010, Oddisee released the instrumental album Traveling Man from Mello Music Group. His Odd Spring mixtape was listed on the Washington Post's Best Local Hip-Hop mixtapes of 2010. In 2011, Oddisee released Rock Creek Park, which was ranked as a Mixtape of the Week by Stereogum. Odd Seasons, a collection of EPs released throughout the previous 12 months, was also released that year.

In 2012, he released a studio album, People Hear What They See. The Beauty in All, his first instrumental release since Rock Creek Park, was released in 2013. In that year, he also released Tangible Dream. In 2015, he released The Good Fight. In 2016, he released an EP, Alwasta, and a mixtape, The Odd Tape. In 2017, he released a studio album, The Iceberg, as well as a live album, Beneath the Surface.

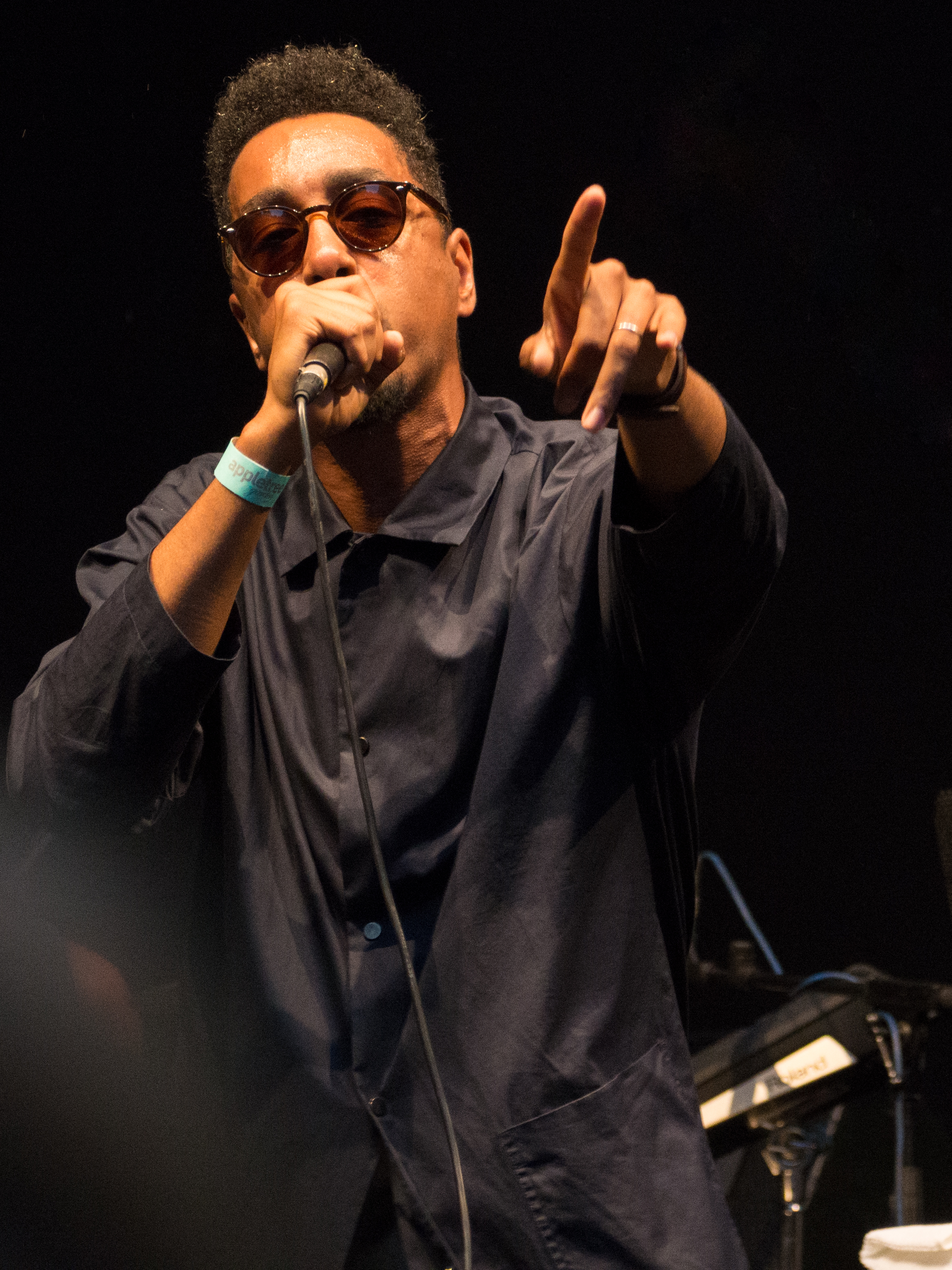
Oddisee performing at the Appletree Garden Festival in Diepholz, Germany, 2016

== Style and influences ==
Oddisee was originally influenced by Black American jazz traditions and the Golden Age of hip-hop from his older American cousins. Oddisee was primarily influenced by Black American musical traditions. Growing up next door to Parliament Funkadelic's bass player Gary Shider in P.G. County, Maryland left a deep musical impact on the young Oddisee. He is also influenced by gospel music and the vocal harmonizing traditions of his Black American heritage. In an interview with NPR, he explained why he was influenced by early East Coast emcees such as Eric B. & Rakim, De La Soul, and A Tribe Called Quest. He stated that these rappers don't talk about drugs or murder, and he could relate more to their lyrics.

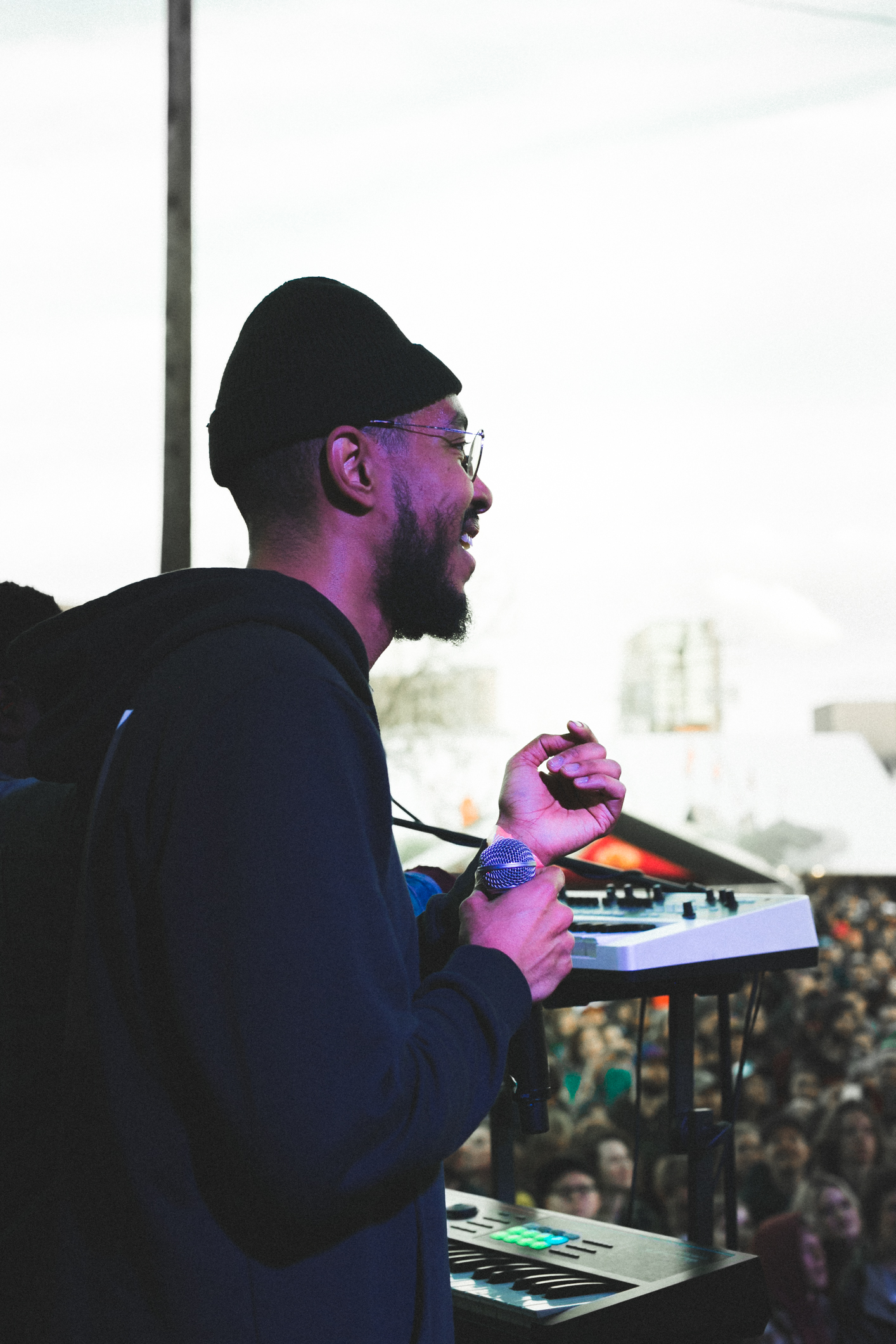
Oddisee at Treefort Music Fest in Boise, Idaho, 2018

== Discography ==
=== Studio albums ===
- 101 (2008)
- Three Way Intersection (2008) (with Ave.To)
- Mental Liberation (2009)
- New Money (2009) (with Trek Life)
- In the Ruff (2009) (with YU and Uptown XO, as Diamond District)
- Traveling Man (2010)
- People Hear What They See (2012)
- The Beauty in All (2013)
- Tangible Dream (2013)
- March on Washington (2014) (with YU and Uptown XO, as Diamond District)
- The Good Fight (2015)
- The Iceberg (2017)
- To What End (2023)

=== Live albums ===
- Beneath the Surface (2017)

=== Compilation albums ===
- Odd Seasons (2011)

=== Mixtapes ===
- Instrumental Mixtape Volume One (2005)
- The Remixture Vol. 1 (2006)
- Foot in the Door (2006)
- Instrumental Mixtape Vol. 2 (2006)
- Odd Summer (2009)
- Odd Autumn (2009)
- Odd Winter (2010)
- Odd Spring (2010)
- Rock Creek Park (2011)
- The Odd Tape (2016)

=== EPs ===
- Good Tree (2008)
- Hear My Dear (2008)
- Odd Renditions Vol. 001 (2012)
- Alwasta (2016)
- Odd Cure (2020)
- And Yet Still (2024)
- En Route (2025)

=== Singles ===
- "Show You" / "Part of the World" (2006) (with Heralds of Change)
- "Once Again" (2006)
- "101" (2008)
- "Slow It Down" (2012)
- "Ain't That Peculiar (Remix)" (2013)
- "Lost Cause" (2014) (with YU and Uptown XO, as Diamond District)
- "That's Love" (2015)

=== Guest appearances ===
- DJ Jazzy Jeff - "Musik Lounge" from The Magnificent (2002)
- The Foreign Exchange - "The Answer" from Connected (2004)
- Kev Brown - "Beats N'Rhymes" from I Do What I Do (2005)
- Kenn Starr - "Nothing But Time" from Starr Status (2006)
- SoulStice - "Get It Right" from Dead Letter Perfect (2007)
- Marco Polo - "Low Budget Allstars" from Port Authority (2007)
- J-Live - "The Upgrade" from Then What Happened? (2008)
- K-Murdock - "Queasy" from "Memories of M.A.W.S.L.O.T." (2008)
- Little Brother (group) - "Delusional" from And Justus For All (2008)
- SoulStice & Sbe - "Unfold" from Beyond Borders (2009)
- Apollo Brown - "Lower the Boom" and "Propa" from The Reset (2010)
- JR & PH7 - "Hustle and Flow" from The Update (2010)
- B-Doub - "All in a Days Work" from Food for Thought (2010)
- Apollo Brown - "The Times" from Clouds (2011)
- DTMD - "Been Tryin'" from Makin' Dollas (2011)
- Trek Life - "Might Sound Crazy" from Wouldn't Change Nothing (2011)
- Eric Lau - "What I'd Rather" (2012)
- Trek Life - "We Good" from Hometown Foreigner (2013)
- Eric Lau - "Rise Up" from One of Many (2013)
- 20syl - "Ongoing Thing" from Motifs (2014)
- Soulpete - "Rhymes on Random" from Soul Raw (2014)
- Apollo Brown - "What You Were Lookin' For" from Grandeur (2015)
- No Wyld - "Nomads" from Nomads (2016)
- L'Orange - "Look Around" from The Ordinary Man (2017)
- Ramey Dawoud - "The Strife" (2020)
- Elaquent - "Guidelines" from Forever Is a Pretty Long Time (2020)
- Silent Knight - "The Gathering" from Restoration Vol. 3 (2024)

=== Production credits ===
- Wordsworth - "Gotta Pay" from Mirror Music (2004)
- Sareem Poems - "Tell It" and "She So" from Black and Read All Over (2009)
- Verbal Kent - "In the Beginning" from Save Your Friends (2010)
- Trek Life - "Ready to Live", "Still Never Rains", "As the World Turns", "Everything Changed Nothing", “Wow", "Due West", "So Supreme", "I'd Rather Be", "So LA", "Jump Out There", and "Might Sound Crazy" from Everything Changed Nothing (2010)
- Georgia Anne Muldrow & Declaime - "Get Up Gogo" from Heaven or Hell (2010)
- Trek Life - "Get in Touch" and "Wouldn't Change Nothing" from Wouldn't Change Nothing (2011)
- Has-Lo - "Last Day of School" from Conversation B (2011)
- Homeboy Sandman - "Whatchu Want from Me?" from First of a Living Breed (2012)
- Substantial - "Check My Resume", "Make Believe", "Shit on My Lawn", "Umoja", and "Movin Alright" from Home Is Where the Art Is (2012)
- Rainy Milo - "The Other Way" from Limey (2012)
- Joey Badass - "Sorry Bonita" from Summer Knights (2013)
- Far Exp - "Checklist" from The Expansion (2014)
- Ardamus - "If Only I Gave Ah" from I Can'Replace Me, Pt. 1: Improve (2014)
- King Mez - "New Vinyl" (2014)
- Finale - Odds & Ends (2015)
- Ardamus - "When The Truth Comes Out, Pt. 2" and "Luxury Tax" I Can'Replace Me, Pt. 2: Develop (2014)
- Lecrae - co-writer of "CC4" on Church Clothes 4
