= Chester Watson (rapper) =

American rapper and record producer

- Also known as: The Monotone Samurai
- Born: Montrell Elijah Haymon; March 16, 1997 (age 29); St. Louis, Missouri, U.S.
- Origin: St. Petersburg, Florida, U.S
- Genres: Hip hop, lo-fi, psychedelic
- Occupations: Rapper; record producer
- Years active: 2012–present
- Label: P.O.W. Recordings
- Member of: Nü Age Syndicate
- Website: chesterwatson.co

Chester Watson (born March 16, 1997) is an American rapper and record producer from St. Petersburg, Florida currently based out of Atlanta, Georgia. He is a member of the crew Nü Age Syndicate.

== Early life ==
Watson was born to separated parents in St. Louis, Missouri. He rarely saw his father, who has been a producer for Three 6 Mafia and a keyboard player for Con Funk Shun and Bar-Kays. He grew up in Clearwater, Florida and spent several years in Georgia. He transferred from a performing arts school, where he studied ballet, to a regular public school in St. Petersburg, Florida.

== Career ==
At the age of 15, Watson started releasing his music online. In 2012, he released a mixtape, Phantom. The music video for its title track caught the attention of Zane Lowe, who played the song on his BBC Radio 1 show. For weeks, the video received tens of thousands of views each day. Watson released Tin Wooki in 2014, Past Cloaks in 2016, and Project 0 in 2018.

On October 31, 2020, Watson released his debut studio album, A Japanese Horror Film.

== Artistry ==
Watson's inspirations are made clear through his music, with references in his lyrics to many artists. In a recent livestream on his Twitch channel, Watson was asked who his biggest inspirations were. He replied with the following artists: Psymun, MF Doom, Odd Future, Mos Def, Madlib, Nujabes, J Dilla, André 3000, Metro Boomin and Travis Scott.

Producing most of his own material, Watson blends genres together, including hip-hop, lo-fi, and psychedelia. In 2017, Watson released a video on his YouTube channel titled "A Moment With Chester Watson", in which he stated "I kinda just want my career to just take its course, and lean towards psychedelia, for sure... because... I don't know, like, that's what I'm influenced by the most." His signature monotone style of delivery is one of the components that sets Watson apart from his contemporaries, and ultimately has given him the nickname of the Monotone Samurai.

In his EP 1997, released on February 27, 2021, Watson made multiple references to the late MF Doom's passing. He released a video for the first track on the EP, "Sunbeam", and in its description wrote "RIP MF DOOM".

== Discography ==
=== Studio albums ===
- A Japanese Horror Film (2020)
- fish don't climb trees (2023)

=== Mixtapes ===
- Phantom (2012)
- Tin Wooki (2014)
- Past Cloaks (2016)
- Project 0 (2018)
- Instrumental Tape (2019)

=== EPs ===
- Space Nobility (2013)
- My Girlfriend Made Me Drop This (2014)
- Summer Mirage (2015)
- Autumn Mirage (2015)
- Spring Mirage (2016) (with Kent Loon)
- 3 of 3 (2016)
- Nebulous (2019)
- 1997 (2021)
- Winter Mirage (2024)
- Montisona (2024)
- Mirage (2025)
- Stargazer, vol i (2025)

=== Singles ===
- "Koi Island" (2015)
- "Marble" (2017)
- "Smog" (2017)
- "Halloween" (2017)
- "Chessmaster" (2018)
- "Afro!" (2019)
- "Time Moves Slower Here" (2019)
- "Cloud Mask" (2019)
