= Chris Orrick =

Detroit rapper

Chris Orrick is a Detroit rapper best known for his albums on the Mello Music label. His songs frequently center on themes of alcoholism and depression.

Orrick began his career with the Michigan-based hip hop collective BLAT! Pack. He originally went by the name Red Pill, but he abandoned the name after it became associated with reactionary communities.
