= Apollo Brown =

American producer (born 1980)

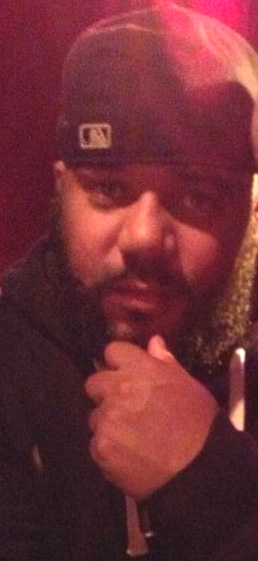
- Brown at the Patronaat in Haarlem, Netherlands on September 10, 2014

Background information
- Born: Erik Vincent Stephens; June 20, 1980 (age 46); Grand Rapids, Michigan, U.S.
- Origin: Detroit, Michigan, U.S.
- Genres: Alternative hip hop; underground hip hop
- Occupations: Record producer; songwriter
- Instruments: Drum machine, keyboards, sampler, turntable
- Years active: 2007–present
- Label: Mello Music

Erik Vincent Stephens (born June 20, 1980), better known professionally as Apollo Brown, is an American record producer from Detroit, Michigan, United States. He is a member of the hip hop group Ugly Heroes (alongside Red Pill and Verbal Kent) and has released numerous collaborations with the likes of Guilty Simpson, O.C., Ras Kass, Skyzoo and Planet Asia.

== Early life ==
Brown grew up in Grand Rapids, Michigan. He later moved to Detroit in 2003, after graduating from Michigan State University.

== Musical career ==
Brown's career in music stretches back to the mid-1990s, but it was not until 2007's Skilled Trade beat collection that things started to become serious. November 3, 2009 saw Brown win the Red Bull Big Tune Championship and he was subsequently contacted by Mello Music Group's Michael Tolle to become a part of MMG independent hip hop movement.

In any collaborations, Brown insists on making albums in the same room as the other artists.

== Style and influences ==
Brown is noted for his use of dated technology – a DJBooth interview reveals his preferred setup is a desktop PC running Windows XP and Cool Edit 2000.

== Discography ==
- Skilled Trade (2007)
- Make Do (2009)
- The Reset (2010)
- Gas Mask (with DJ Soko & Journalist 103 as The Left) (2010)
- Brown Study (with Boog Brown) (2010)
- Clouds (2011)
- Daily Bread (with Hassaan Mackey) (2011)
- Trophies (with O.C.) (2012)
- Dice Game (with Guilty Simpson) (2012)
- The Brown Tape (with Ghostface Killah) (2013)*
- Ugly Heroes (with Red Pill & Verbal Kent as Ugly Heroes) (2013)
- Cigarette Burns EP (2014)
- Thirty Eight (2014)
- Abrasions: Stitched Up (with Planet Asia) (2014)*
- Ugly Heroes EP (with Red Pill & Verbal Kent as Ugly Heroes) (2014)
- Blasphemy (with Ras Kass) (2014)
- Words Paint Pictures (with Rapper Big Pooh) (2015)
- Grandeur (2015)
- Everything in Between (with Red Pill & Verbal Kent as Ugly Heroes) (2016)
- Mr. T (With Westside Gunn) (2016)
- The Easy Truth (with Skyzoo) (2016)
- Anchovies (with Planet Asia) (2017)
- No Question (with Locksmith) (2018)
- Mona Lisa (with Joell Ortiz) (2018)
- Sincerely, Detroit (2019)
- As God Intended (with Che Noir) (2020)
- Lovesick (with Raheem DeVaughn) (2021)
- Stitched Up & Shaken (with Planet Asia, Gensu Dean & Guilty Simpson) (2021)
- Blacklight (with Stalley) (2021)
- Bushido Code (with Prop Dylan) (2022)
- This Must Be The Place (2022)
- Cost of Living (with Philmore Greene) (2022)
- Sardines (with Planet Asia) (2023)
- This, Is Not That (with CRIMEAPPLE) (2025)
- Run Toward The Monster (with Ty Farris) (2025)
- Elevator Music (2025)
- Funeral For A Dream (with Bronze Nazareth) (2025)
- No Pressure, No Diamond. (2026)
- Luxury Tax (with Skyzoo) (2026)
