= Kenn Starr =

American rapper

- Born: Kenneth Jones
- Origin: Suffolk, Virginia, USA
- Genre: Hip-hop
- Occupation: Rapper
- Years active: 2001–present
- Labels: Halftooth Records, Mello Music Group

Kenneth Jones, known as Kenn Starr is an American rapper from Suffolk, Virginia, currently residing in the Washington, D.C. metro area. Starr is a member of the Low Budget Crew and also the duo Isaac Jones. His solo debut album, Starr Status, was released in 2006. Square One was released in 2015. His latest album, Cold was released June 24 2025

== Music career ==
=== Low Budget Crew ===
Low Budget Crew (also known as Low Budget Productions) is a collective of Hip-hopians based in the Washington D.C. area. The crew was formed in the early 2000s, and Starr joined in 2001 with D.C. locals Oddisee, Kev Brown, Critically Acclaimed, and Cy Young. The first all-round Low Budget release was producer Kev Brown's I Do What I Do, in 2005, followed by Kenn Starr's Starr Status, in 2006.

=== Solo career ===
Starr's connection with fellow Low Budget Crew producer Oddisee landed him a deal with New York-based indie label Halftooth Records, which released his debut single, "If", featuring Talib Kweli and Asheru, in early 2004. "If" and its B-side, "Walk the Walk", were included on the Halftooth Records compilation, You Don't Know the Half. The single led to a number of guest appearances including: The Foreign Exchange's "The Answer", Wordsworth's "Head High", and Symbolyc One and Illmind's "Guilty Pleasures".

In June 2006, Starr released The Starr Report, a mixtape featuring most of his unreleased guest appearances on albums by the likes of Supastition, Cesar Comanche, The Foreign Exchange, and Kev Brown; followed by the single "Against the Grain".

=== 2006: Starr Status ===
On August 29, 2006, Starr's debut album, Starr Status, was released, featuring production from Illmind, Khrysis, Kev Brown, Oddisee, DJ Roddy Rod and M-Phazes. Featured guests on the album included Kev Brown, Starr's Isaac Jones partner Sean Born, Supastition, Median, Talib Kweli and Asheru. The album features the single "Against the Grain" b/w "Waitin' on You"/"Back at it Again", and the bonus track "If", Starr's 2004 debut single.

Starr Status garnered the rapper attention from magazines including Scratch, The Source, and JIVE, who called Starr "one of the best MCs in the game".

=== 2009: It's Still Real ===
In 2009, Starr released the mixtape It's Still Real. The unmixed non-tape is a discography update of sorts – collecting the guest appearances and collaborations Kenn has done since his 2006 debut, Starr Status. Included are production and appearances by the likes of 9th Wonder, Kev Brown, Marco Polo, Oddisee, Raheem DeVaughn, Wale, and more.

=== 2010–present: Square One ===
Starr's second full-length album, entitled "Square One," was originally scheduled for 2011 but eventually released in 2015 on Mello Music Group.

== Discography ==
=== Albums ===
- Starr Status (Halftooth Records, 2006)
- Square One (Mello Music Group, 2015)
- COLD (South 7th Street Music, 2025)

=== Mixtapes ===
- The Starr Report (2006)
- It's Still Real (2009)
