= L'Orange (music producer) =

American hip-hop producer

- Born: Austin Hart; December 7, 1991 (age 34); North Carolina, U.S.
- Genres: Alternative hip-hop; jazz rap; psychedelic rap; sampledelia
- Occupation: Record producer
- Years active: 2011–present
- Labels: Jakarta Records; Mello Music Group
- Website: lorange.bandcamp.com

Austin Hart (born December 7, 1991), better known by his stage name L'Orange, is an American hip-hop record producer from North Carolina. He is formerly signed to Mello Music Group. In 2023, he founded label Old Soul Music.

A documentary film about his severe hearing loss due to cholesteatoma, premiered at the Slamdance Film Festival on January 20, 2023.

== Discography ==
=== Studio albums ===
- Old Soul (2011) (Re-released in 2023)
- The Mad Writer (2012)
- The City Under the City (2013) (with Stik Figa)
- The Orchid Days (2014)
- The Night Took Us In like Family (2015) (with Jeremiah Jae)
- Time? Astonishing! (2015) (with Kool Keith)
- The Life & Death of Scenery (2016) (with Mr. Lif)
- The Ordinary Man (2017)
- Marlowe (2018) (with Solemn Brigham, as Marlowe)
- Complicate Your Life with Violence (2019) (with Jeremiah Jae)
- Marlowe 2 (2020) (with Solemn Brigham, as Marlowe)
- Imaginary Everything (2021) (with Namir Blade)
- The World is Still Chaos, But I feel Better (2021)
- Marlowe 3 (2022) (with Solemn Brigham, as Marlowe)
- Signature (2023) (with Joell Ortiz)

=== EPs ===
- The Manipulation EP (2011)
- Still Spinning (2012)
- After the Flowers (2014)
- Koala (2016)

=== Singles ===
- "Whin" (2012)
- "Until the Break" (2012)
- "Alone" (2013)
- "Super Hero" (2016)
- "Blame the Author" (2017)
- "Lost Arts" (2018)
- "Demonstration" (2018)
- "The Basement" (2018)
- "The Talkative Mailman Can't Read" (2018)
- "Dead Battery" (2019)
- "Future Power Sources" (2020)
- "O.G. Funk Rock" (2020)
- "Lamilton Taeshawn" (2020)
- "Otherworld" (2020)
- "Corner Store Scandal" (2021)
- "Point to Point" (2021)
- "Past Life" (2022)
- "Royal" (2022)

== Musical style ==
For his music he samples mainly old jazz, swing and soul songs, which he combines with old radio broadcasts and film noir audios. To produce his songs he uses a MPC and old vinyl records amongst other equipment.
