= Mello Music Group =

American independent record label

- Founded: 2007
- Distributors: The Orchard (former); Rostrum Pacific (current)
- Genre: Progressive Rap; Boom Bap; Indie Rap
- Country of origin: United States
- Location: Arizona
- Official website: MelloMusicGroup.com

Mello Music Group (MMG) is an American independent record label based in Tucson, Arizona. Founded in 2007, Mello Music has released hip hop compilations and albums by producers and rappers such as Oddisee, Apollo Brown, Mr. Lif, Ghostface Killah, Open Mike Eagle, L'Orange, Quelle Chris, Jean Grae, Kool Keith, Nottz, Georgia Anne Muldrow, Pete Rock, and Big Pooh. In 2012, MTV Hive described MMG as having a "dedication to intelligent, street-wise boom bap", although the label has released a number of purely instrumental albums as well. In 2016, Forbes magazine called Mello Music Group the most successful indie rap label of the decade.

== History ==
=== 2007–2010: Founding, first releases ===
An early form of the label, Mello Mixtapes, was founded by Arizona hip hop fan Michael Tolle in 2004. As a college deejay Tolle releases a series of hip hop mixtapes, also avidly collecting vinyl.

"After a year of working 80 hour weeks, I was missing the days when I dug through records all night, helped throw after hours events, and lived for music. I had continued listening, but now I had some extra money and didn’t know shit about flipping houses or the market, so I invested in what I knew about, what I wanted to support – beats, rhymes, and cuts."
— Founder Michael Tolle

Tolle graduated from the University of Arizona in 2006, and afterwards had founded an educational company that catered to international professors and teachers on sabbatical. After working with the company for a year, he decided he'd prefer working with music. He first founded Mello Music Group in the fall of 2007, using his laptop and cell phone to organize the business from his home in Tucson, Arizona.

According to Tolle, "I started with making one song. I spent every penny I had to get a Kev Brown beat, a Kenn Starr verse, and Rob Swift on the cuts." Tolle has quoted the Barely Breaking Even Beat Generation Series of albums as an important stylistic influence on Mello Music Group, and he also studied labels such as Blue Note, Motown, also paying attention to Stones Throw Records and Roc-A-Fella Records. Rap artist Dudley Perkins and the producer Oddisee were also involved in the early business affairs of the label, and were later joined by producer Apollo Brown.

The label started with putting out only a few albums a year; one in 2008 and four in 2009 Tolle has stated that In the Ruff by Diamond District in 2009 was the label's breakthrough album. MTV Hive called the album "Arguably the best hip-hop album ever released in D.C." Singer Georgia Anne Muldrow produced and is featured with Dudley Perkins on an album for Mello Music Group titled SomeOthaShip: Connect Game.

=== 2011–2012: Increased output ===
The label released nine albums in 2010, and in 2011, the label worked on several dozen projects. Unlike many independent labels, MMG as of 2011 offered regular paychecks to their signed artists as compared to advances, with Tolle stating "we try to provide stability, regular paychecks instead of chunk advances. This gives a little more peace of mind, and means that everyone is free to work on music... it’s also about making people feel like they have an entire career to develop, not just a fiscal quarter to show results." The company continues to be based in Tucson as of 2011. Oddisee as of 2011 was working as the company's Assistant Director of Operations, while Tolle continued to serve as the company's Director of Operations.

Trophies is the debut collaboration album by D.I.T.C. member O.C. and Detroit, Michigan producer Apollo Brown. It was released on May 1, 2012, by Mello Music Group. The first single was "Prove Me Wrong." Dice Game is a collaborative studio album by Brown and rapper Guilty Simpson. It was released online by Mello Music Group on November 6, 2012, in digital format, and physical copies were made available on November 13, 2012. The record was entirely produced and arranged by Apollo Brown, and features guest appearances from Torae and Planet Asia.

=== 2013–2015 ===
As of 2014 Oddisee continues to produce for the label, often working closely with artists such as rapper Substantial. In early 2014 MMG released the compilation Mandala Vol. 1, Polysonic Flows, which featured a wide variety of their signed artists.

In January 2014 Virginia artist Rapper Big Pooh signed a two-album deal with the label. The first release will be an album produced entirely by Virginia producer Nottz, while the second project will be an EP produced by the label's production roster. In February 2014 it was announced that Chicago rapper Open Mike Eagle, who had been named 2013 Rapper of the Year by Impose Magazine, had signed a three-album deal with Mello Music. The deal led to the release of his album Dark Comedy several months later.

Releases for fall 2014 included a new album from Diamond District (Oddisee, Uptown XO and yU the 78er) called March on Washington and a collaboration album between rapper Ras Kass and producer Apollo Brown called Blasphemy.

Several albums were released in 2015, including Kenn Starr's Square One, the compilation album Persona, Red Pill's Look What This World Did To Us, Open Mike Eagle's A Special Episode Of, Oddisee's The Good Fight, Rapper Big Pooh's Words Paint Pictures (produced by Apollo Brown), L'Orange & Jeremiah Jae's The Night Took Us In Like Family, Georgia Anne Muldrow's A Thoughtiverse Unmarred, Pete Rock's PeteStrumentals 2, L'Orange & Kool Keith's Time? Astonishing!, Finale's Odds & Ends, Verbal Kent's Anesthesia, Apollo Brown's Grandeur, Semi Hendrix's (Ras Kass, Jack Splash) Breakfast At Banksy's, Rapper Big Pooh & Nottz's Home Sweet Home and Red Pill's Day Drunk EP.

In October 2015, veteran rapper Mr. Lif signed to Mello Music Group for an album deal of two new studio albums, plus the reissue of his debut album I Phantom, which was released on November 27, 2015.

=== 2016–Present: Recent Releases ===
In 2016, Mello Music Group released new albums from Mr. Lif, Ugly Heroes, Oddisee, Open Mike Eagle & Paul White, Lando Chill, Kool Keith, L'Orange, Chris Orrick, and Apollo Brown & Skyzoo.

In 2019, Homeboy Sandman signed to Mello Music Group.

== Distribution ==
From the label's inception, releases were distributed by Fat Beats Records. In 2015, Mello Music Group switched distribution to the Orchard. In 2024, Mello Music Group entered into distribution with Redeye Worldwide. In 2026, Mello Music Group changed their distributor to Rostrum Pacific.

== Style and genres ==
"We’re giving a real picture of what’s happening within American culture today. I don’t think we’re trying to mimic anything from the past. I don’t think we’re trying to live a fantasy. I think all of our artists really have their finger lyrically on what’s going on right now, and so they’re kind of like poets."
— Michael Tolle

Mello Music Group has released a number of purely instrumental albums, many of which are the side projects of hip hop producers associated with the label. The label also focuses on the hip hop music of various scenes, including Detroit hip hop. In 2012 MTV Hive described MMG as having "dedication to intelligent, street-wise boom bap... these artists make attainable music that doesn’t find them praising their jewelry or stunting on private jets. Instead, they talk about real-life issues that relate to everyday listeners — paying bills, raising children, and finding inner peace."

== Current artists ==
- Apollo Brown
- Gensu Dean
- Georgia Anne Muldrow
- Homeboy Sandman
- Joell Ortiz
- Kool Keith
- The Lasso
- Namir Blade
- Oddisee
- Open Mike Eagle
- Paradime
- Quelle Chris
- Seba Kaapstad
- Skyzoo
- Solemn Brigham

== See also ==
- List of record labels
- Underground hip hop
