= CNTRL (disambiguation) =

CNTRL is the gene that encodes the centriolin protein.

CNTRL may also refer to:

- CNTRL: Beyond EDM, an Electronic Dance Music educational initiative
- A synonym for CTRL, the "Control"/"Ctrl" key on the computer keyboard
- CNTRL, the French-language abbreviation for National Centre for Textual and Lexical Resources

== See also ==
- CTRL (disambiguation)
