= CTRL =

CTRL or Ctrl may refer to several things:

== Arts and entertainment ==
- Ctrl (web series), an American comedy web series from NBC
- Ctrl (Derek Webb album), a 2012 album by singer-songwriter Derek Webb
- Ctrl (SZA album), a 2017 album by singer-songwriter SZA
- CTRL (TV series), a 2021 Singaporean television drama
- CTRL (film), a 2024 Indian thriller film from Netflix

== Other uses ==
- Channel Tunnel Rail Link or High Speed 1 (HS1), a high-speed railway line linking London with the Channel Tunnel
- Control key, an input button present on most computer keyboards, typically labelled ctrl
- CTRL (gene), a gene that in humans encodes the enzyme chymotrypsin-like protease CTRL-1
- Control4 (stock symbol), a brand of automation and networking systems

== See also ==
- Control-Alt-Delete (disambiguation)
- CNTRL, protein that in humans is encoded by the CNTRL gene
- CNTRL: Beyond EDM, a North American educational initiative, centered on electronic dance music
