= Computer Cooties =

Mixtape by Busdriver
- Released: October 6, 2010
- Genre: Hip Hop
- Length: 51:33
- Producer: Busdriver; Daedelus; Flying Lotus; Free the Robots; Moderat; Modeselektor

Busdriver chronology
Jhelli Beam (2009)	Computer Cooties (2010)	Beaus$Eros (2012)

Computer Cooties is a mixtape by American hip hop artist Busdriver. It was released on October 6, 2010. It was available free on Busdriver's official website for a limited time.

== Track listing ==
No.	Title	Artist(s)	Length
1.	"Thick Enough" (featuring Daedelus)	Busdriver	4:34
2.	"Computer Cooties"	Busdriver	3:07
3.	"Man Baby"	Busdriver	2:50
4.	"Encyclopedia Wand"	Busdriver	2:54
5.	"Unibrow" (featuring Free the Robots)	Busdriver	3:36
6.	"Deer God" (featuring Open Mike Eagle)	Busdriver	3:33
7.	"Beats Way Sick" (featuring Busdriver)	Moderat	4:00
8.	"End Game (Busdriver Remix)"	Antipop Consortium	3:52
9.	"Split Seconds (Modeselektor Remix)"	Busdriver	4:45
10.	"Will He" (featuring Flying Lotus)	Busdriver	3:02
11.	"Flesh Glove" (featuring Daedelus)	Busdriver	3:02
12.	"Speak Up"	Busdriver	1:40
13.	"(In) Reverse (Busdriver Remix)"	Sister Crayon	4:05
14.	"Coat of Arms (Busdriver Cover)"	Nosaj Thing	3:28
15.	"Coon Talk"	Busdriver	3:12
Total length:			51:33
