= Seasaw =

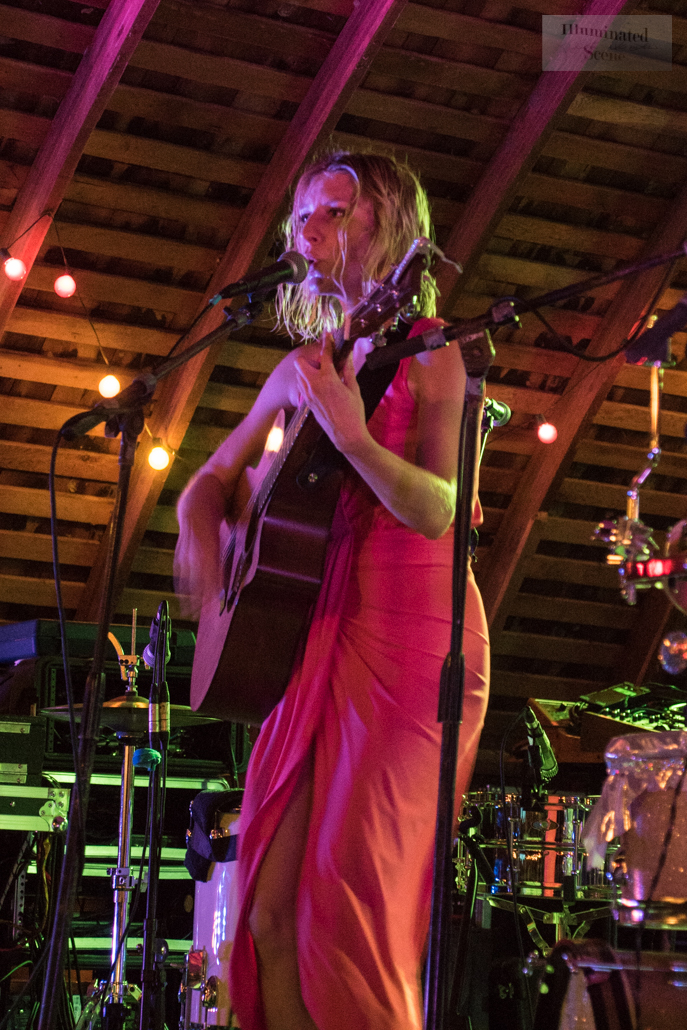

Background information
- Origin: Madison, Wisconsin, United States
- Genres: Indie Rock
- Years active: 2010-present
- Members: Eve Wilczewski and Meg Golz
- Website: http://www.singseasaw.com/

Seasaw is an American indie rock band duo from Madison, Wisconsin which consists of Eve Wilczewski and Meg Golz. They have released four full-length albums: Seasaw (2011), The Look In Your Eyes Tells Me This Is A Bad Idea (2014), Too Much of a Good Thing (2016), and Big Dogs (2018). In 2020, while quarantined for the COVID-19 pandemic, the band released a video for their new song "Inventor" which will be featured on their next album.

Golz and Wilczewski met while working in an Italian restaurant in Freeport, Illinois. They realized they had similar taste in music, and began playing together, at first as "BoboMosie," a CocoRosie cover band and eventually composing originals as Seasaw.

Seasaw's album "Too Much Of A Good Thing" was selected as one of the top five underground albums of the month by The Nerdist in July 2016. The same month, they were named Top Emerging Artist at Wisconsin Summerfest. Their song "Into the White" was one of Daytrotter's Best Songs of 2016.

Seasaw has performed with artists including Lucius, Thao and the Get Down Stay Down, SOAK, Lissie, Mason Jennings, Har Mar Superstar and Shakey Graves.

The video for their 2016 single "Waiting Song" was shot entirely using the Snapchat app. Seasaw's artistic, unique, innovative and avant garde videos have gained them praise from multiple indie music writers. Their 2017 video for "Light" was created in collaboration with local Madison artist Chad Smith and is fully compatible with VR. The debut single from their new album recently premiered on The Grey Estates and turns the tables on the misogyny the band has encountered while playing as a strong feminist duo.

Golz holds a degree in audio engineering from the Madison Media Institute and Wilczewski was a painting major at University of Illinois

== Discography ==
- Seasaw (2011, digital)
- The Look In Your Eyes Tells Me This Is A Bad Idea (2014, digital and CD)
- Too Much Of A Good Thing (2016, digital, CD, and pink vinyl)
- Big Dogs (2018, digital, CD, blue vinyl)

== Videography ==
- Waiting Song (2016, Snapchat Video)

- Ex-Girlfriend (2016)

- Into the White (2017)

- Light (2017, Virtual Reality and 3D)

- Say It Ain't So (2017, Weezer Cover)

- Party (2017)

- Big Dogs (2018)

- God(zilla) (2018)

- Knockout (2018)

- Hangin' Out Too Much (2018)

- In Spite Of Me (2019)

- No Way (2019)

- Inventor (2020)
