= Perfect Hair =

Perfect Hair may refer to:

- Perfect Hair (album), a 2014 studio album by American rapper Busdriver
- "Perfect Hair", a song by Danger Doom from the album The Mouse and the Mask

== See also ==
- Perfect Hair Forever, an American comedy animated television series
