= Free the Robots =

American underground hip hop producer

- Birth name: Christopher Mark Alfaro
- Origin: Santa Ana, California, United States
- Genres: Instrumental hip hop; dubstep; trip hop; nu-jazz
- Occupation: Producer
- Years active: 2003-present
- Labels: Alpha Pup Records

Free the Robots (born Christopher Mark Alfaro) is an underground hip hop producer from Los Angeles, California.

== Style ==
Free the Robots pulls together jazz, dubstep, psychedelic music, electronic music, hip hop and elements from ancestral Filipino influences, samples and folklore.

== History ==
Free the Robots started as a side project by Chris Alfaro in 2003, while he was also playing with different bands, DJing, and producing tracks for MCs using samples, controllers, and other live instruments. He is known as one of the pioneering artists to come out of LA's beat movement and has shared stages with the likes of Prefuse 73, Flying Lotus, DJ Shadow, Afrika Bambaataa and more. His second album Ctrl Alt Del, which features Isaiah "Ikey" Owens, was released on Alpha Pup Records in 2010. DATU (2019) "mixed samples sourced from Filipino albums with organic percussion instruments and chirping nature noises." His 2022 album Kaduwa "is a product of a trip to the Philippines, the country of his roots, which unexpectedly turned into a year-long stay when Covid-19 hit. While immersing himself in his ancestral influences on Siargao Island, Alfaro used just the bare-bones equipment he had with him."

== Discography ==
=== Albums ===
- Prototype (2005)
- Japanese exclusive (2008)
- Ctrl Alt Delete (2010)
- The Balance (2013)
- Sempervirens w/ Opio (2015)
- KARAVAN w/ Lefto (2017)
- DATU (2019)
- Kaduwa (2022)
- DATU 2 (2024)

=== EPs ===
- Free The Robots EP (2007)
- Free The Robots EP 2 (2010)
- Free The Robots EP 3 (2010)
- The Killer Robots (2008) w/ The Gaslamp Killer
- The Mind's Eye (2011)
- Free the Robots EP Vol. II (2012)
- Free the Robots EP Vol. III (2012)
- In Other Worlds (2013)
- The Balance (2014)
- Two Snakes EP (2015)
- Subconscious Mind EP (2015) w/ Opio

=== Productions ===
- "Least Favorite Rapper" by Busdriver on Jhelli Beam (2009)
- "DSD2" by Nocando on Jimmy the Lock (2010)
- "Unibrow" by Busdriver on Computer Cooties (2010)
- "10 Haters" by Flash Bang Grenada on 10 Haters (2011)
- "Free the Robots" by Capital Steez on AmeriKKKan Korruption (2012)
- "Strange Light" collaboration DJ Krush on Butterfly Effect (2016)
- "Sallem" collaboration Emel Mathlouthi on Ensenity (2018)
- "Sweetness of the New" remix Gray on Limited 7" (2018)
