= List of French words of Germanic origin (A-B) =

List of French words

This list of French words of Germanic origin is a dictionary of standard modern French words and phrases deriving from any Germanic language of any period, whether incorporated in the formation of the French language or borrowed at any time thereafter.

== Scope of the dictionary ==
The following list details words, affixes and phrases that contain Germanic etymons. Words where only an affix is Germanic (e.g. méfait, bouillard, carnavalesque) are excluded, as are words borrowed from a Germanic language where the origin is other than Germanic (for instance, cabaret is from Dutch, but the Dutch word is ultimately from Latin/Greek, so it is omitted). Likewise, words which have been calqued from a Germanic tongue (e.g. pardonner, bienvenue, entreprendre, toujours, compagnon, plupart, manuscrit, manoeuvre), or which received their usage or sense (i.e. were created, modified or influenced) due to Germanic speakers or Germanic linguistic habits (e.g. comté, avec, commun, on, panne, avoir, ça) are not included.

Many other Germanic words found in older versions of French, such as Old French and Anglo-French are no longer extant in Standard Modern French. Many of these words do, however, continue to survive dialectally and in English. See: List of English Latinates of Germanic origin.

== A ==
Utterance	Translation	Germanic Element	Etymology	Period	References
à la bonne franquette	informally	franquette	Normanno-Picard, from franc, a Germanic word known in French from the 11th century, the same as English frank	17th century	CNRTL à la bonne franquette, CNRTL franc^{3}

- aalénien (Geol.)
- abandon "abandonment" (< OFr à bandon < ML *bandum < Frk *ban < Gmc *ban-, band-)
  abandonner
  abandonnement
  abandonnataire
  abandonné
  abandonnée
  abandonnément
  abandonneur
  abandonneuse
- abâtardir "to abase" (< Fr à bâtard < ML bastardus, OFr bastard < Gmc *bāst-, bōst- + Gmc *-hard-)
  abâtardissement
  abâtardi
- abigotir
- abord "approach" (< Fr à bord < OFr bord, bort < Frk *bord < Gmc *borþam)
  aborder
  abordage
  abordable
  abordé
  abordée
  abordeur
- abot
  aboter (also abotter)
  aboté
  aboteau
- abotter
  abotté
- abouter "(trade term) to join the ends of something" ( < à + OFr boter < Frk *bautan, bōtan (cf Frk *but "end", ON bútr) < Gmc)
  about
  abouté
  aboutage
  aboutement
- aboutir "to arrive at, end in" ( < à + OFr boter < Frk *bautan, bōtan (cf Frk *but "end", ON bútr) < Gmc)
  abouti
  aboutissant
  aboutissement
- aboutonner
- abraquer (Naut.) "to direct" ( < à + braquer "to direct, point" < ON brāka "to fix, set on, weaken" < Gmc)
- abri "shelter" ( < OFr abrier "to cover" < LL abrigare < a- + brigare "to cover" < Frk *berihan "to cover" and Frk *berc, geberc "asylum, protection" < Gmc, cf OHG birihan "to cover", OE (be)wrēon "to cover", OHG bergan "to cover, hide")
  abri-fou (also abrifou)
  abri-galant
  abri-sous-roche
  abri-vent (also abrivent)
  abrier (possibly, or from Latin "Apricus")
- abrier (also abreyer) "to protect, guarantee"
  abriter
- abriter "to shelter"
  abrité
  abritant
  abritement
- abroutir "to crop"
  abrouti
  abroutis
- abuter
- accon (also acon) "barge"
  acconnage (also aconnage)
  acconnier
- accore (Naut.) "piece of wood serving as a ship's stay"
  accorer
- accrocher "to hook, hook up, tear with a hook" ( < à + Fr croc < ON krókr, kráka "hook" < Gmc)
  accroc
  accroche
  accrochable
  accrochage
  accroche-cœur
  accroche-lumière
  accroche-plat
  accroche-tubes
  accrocheur
  accrocheuse
- accroupir "to cower down, squat" ( < à + Fr croupe "rump" < OFr crope < ON kroppr, kryppa < Gmc)
- achôcre (Dial) "awkward; good for nothing" ( < Norm "brutal, rough" < ON skakr "a scolding" < Gmc)
- achopper "to stumble" ( < à + Fr chopper < OFr choper < Gmc, cf Germ schupfen)
  achoppement
- acre "acre" ( < L *acrum < Gmc, cf Goth akr, OE æcer, Eng acre, Germ Acker)
- adouber "to arm, strike" ( < Fr à + douber < OFr duber & dober < Gmc, cf OE dubban "to dub")
- aéro-club
- affaît "ridge"
  affaîter
- affaler "to lower a rope, drive toward the shore" ( < Dut afhalen < Gmc)
  affalé
  affalement
- affourrager "to feed, fodder"
  affourragement
- affranchir "to free" ( < à + Fr franc < OFr franc < Gmc)
  affranchi
  affranchie
  affranchissant
  affranchisseur
  affranchissement
  enfranchisement
- affres (also affre) "pangs" ( < Prov affre < Goth aifrs < Gmc)
- affrètement
- affréter "to freight, lade" ( < à + Fr fret "freight" < Gmc)
  affréteur
- affreux "frightful, horrible" ( < à + Fr affre "fright, terror" < OFr afre < Gmc, cf OHG eiver)
  affre
  affreuse
  affreusement
- agacer "to set on edge" ( < It agazzare < OHG hazjan "to harry" < Gmc)
- age (Agric.) "tiller, ploughshare" ( < OFr haie < Frk *hagja "hedge, fence" < Gmc, cf Germ Hecke, OE hecg "hedge")
- agasse "magpie" ( < OHG agalstra < Gmc)
- agourmandi
  agourmandie
- agrafe "hook, clasp" ( < OFr agrape < LL *agrappa < ad + *grappa < Gmc, cf OHG krapfo)
  agrafer
  agrafé
  agrafeur
  agrafeuse
  agrafure
- agrapper
  agrappe
  agrape
- agréer "to rig"
- agrès "(naut) tackling, rigging" ( < gréer "to rig" < Gmc *garaiþjanan "to ready")
- agriffer
- agrincher (also agricher) ( < Frk *grīpjan "to seize" < Gmc)
  agrinche
  agrincheur
- agripper "to grip, grab"
  agrippant
  agrippement
  agrippeur
  agrippeuse
  agrippe-rossignols
- agrouper
  agroupé
  agroupement
- aguerrir "to accustom to war" ( < à + Fr guerre < OFr guerre < Frk *werra < Gmc *werra)
  aguerri
  aguerrie
  aguerrissement
- aguet (usu. pl. aguets) "ambush, wait" ( < OFr aguet < guetter < Frk *wahtōn < *wahta < Gmc)
  aguetter
- aguicher
  aguichage
  aguichant
  aguiché
  aguicherie
  aguicheur
  aguicheuse
- aguimpé
  aguimpée
- aheurter "to be bent on, be stubborn" ( < à + Fr heurter < Gmc)
  aheurté
  aheurtement
- ahonter
- ahurir "to amaze" ( < à + Fr hure < Gmc)
  ahuri
  ahurie
  ahurissant
  ahurissement
- aigrefin "swindler"
  aigrefine
- aigrette "egret" ( < OFr aigrette < OProv aigreta < aigron "heron" < OHG heigaro "heron" < Gmc)
- aire "eyry" ( < Germ aren "to make a nest" < aar "eagle" < Gmc)
  aigretté (also aigreté)
- -ais adjective suffix ( < LL -iscus < Frk *-isk < Gmc, cf OE -isc "-ish")
  -aise
- alamannique
- alan (also alain)
- alboche
- ale "ale"
- alêne (also alène) "awl" ( < OFr alesne < OHG alasna, alansa < Gmc)
  alèné
- alérion ( < Frk *adalaro, adalarjo "eagle, noble eagle" < Gmc)
- alize (also alise) "lote-tree berry" ( < Gmc, cf OHG elira)
- allemand "German" ( < Lat Allemanni < Gmc)
  allemande
  allemanderie
  allemanisé
- alleu (also aleu) "allodial property, allodial ownership" ( < OFr alou, aloud < MerovLat *allodium < Frk *allōd- < all- "all" + ōd "patrimony" < Gmc, cf OHG alôd)
  franc-alleu
  alleutier (also aleutier)
- allo (also allô) "hello"
- allodial "allodial"
  allodiale
  allodialité
- allotir "to allot"
  allotissement
- alpenstock
- alque ( < Norw alke < ON alka < Gmc)
- alsacien
- amade
- amadouer "to coax, cajole" ( MFr a- + madouer "to lure, give meat to" < ON mata (Dan made) "to lure, feed" < Gmc, cf Goth matjan "to eat")
  amadou
  amadouage
  amadoué
  amadoueur
  amadoueuse
  amadouement
  amadouvier
- amarelle
- amarrer "to moor"
  amarre
  amarré
  amarrage
  amarrage
- amatir
- amers
- amet
- amignarder
- amignonner
- amignoter (also amignotter)
- amignouter (also amignoutter)
- amman
- ammeistre
- amocher
  amoché
  amochée
- amuser "to amuse" ( < OFr amuser "to stupefy" < a- + muser "to stare stupidly at, be bewildered", either < OFr mus "snout" < ML musum < Gmc; or < Frk *masjan, musōn "to stun, confuse, confound" < Gmc, cf OE (ā)masian "to confuse, stupefy, bewilder", ON masa "to struggle, be confused", Norw mas "exhausting labour", Norw masast "to be dazed, begin to dream", Swed masa "to dawdle, idle", Swed mos "sluggish, sleepy")
  amusement
  amusable
  amusamment
  amusant
  amusante
  amusard
  amusé
  amuse-gueule
  amusée
  amusette
  amuseur
  amuseuse
- anche "pipe, reed" ( < Frk *ankja "bone canal" < Gmc, cf Goth *inka)
- anché "herald"
  anchée
- -and (also -an, -ain ) agent suffix ( < OFr -anc, -enc < Frk *-inc < Gmc, cf Eng -ing)
  -ande
  Flamand
  tisserand
- -ange noun suffix (e.g. mésange) ( < Frk *-ing < Gmc)
- anglais
  anglaise
  anglaisé
  anglaiser
- angleterre
- Anglican
  anglicane
  anglicanisme
- angliche
- angliciser
  anglicisé
  anglicisme
- Anglo-américain
- Anglo-arabe
- Anglo-normand
- Anglo-Saxon
  Anglo-saxonne
- anglomane
  anglomaniaque
  anglomanie
- anglophile
  anglophilie
- anglophobe
  anglophobie
- anglophone
- angon
- angstroem (also angström)
- anordir
- anschluss
- anspect "lever" ( < Dut handtspeecke "hand-stick" < Gmc)
- anté-bois (also antébois)
- antéallergique
- antébourgeois
- anti-allemand
  anti-allemande
- anti-bélier
- anti-bois
- anti-français (also antifrançais)
- anti-France
- anti-guérilla
- anti-guerrier
- anti-joli
- anti-raciste
- anti-skating
- anti-star (also antistar)
- antichoc
- antidoping
- antifading
- antigang
- antigaulliste
- antigrippe
- antirides
- antitrust
  antitrusts
- apiquer
  apiquage
- aplat
  aplatir
- aplatir
- aplati
- aplatissage
- aplatissant
- aplatissement
- aplatisseur
- aplatissoir
- aplatissoire
- après-guerre
- après-ski
- après-souper
- arauder
- arc-bouter
  arc-boutant
  arc-bouté
  arc-boutement
- -ard noun suffix ( < OFr -ard < LL -ardus < Frk *-hard < Gmc, cf OHG -hart, Goth -hardus)
  -arde
- ardillon "tongue of a buckle" ( < MFr hardillon < Frk *hard "hard" < Gmc + -ille + -on)
- arlequin "harlequin"
  arlequine
  arlequiner
- arlequiner
  arlequiné
  arlequinade
- armet "helmet, headpiece" ( < It elmetto "helmet" < Fr helme, heaume "helmet" < Frk *helm < Gmc *helmaz, cf OE helm "helm, helmet")
- armon
- arnac (also arnaque)
  arnache
  arnaquer
- arnaquer ( < Pic harnacher, arnaquer "to amuse, swindle" < harnacher "to harness, equip, disguise" < Gmc)
  arnaqueur
  arnaqueuse
- arnauldiste (also arnaldiste)
- arquebuse "arquebus"
  arquebuser
- arquebuser
  arquebusade
  arquebuserie
  arquebusier
- arquemontant ( alt. of earlier arqubouter < Gmc)
  arquemontante
- arranger "to arrange"
  arrangement
  arrangé
  arrangeable
  arrangeant
  arrangeur
- arrière-ban "arriere-ban"
- arrière-fief
- arrière-garde
- arrière-salle
- arrimer
  arrimage
  arrimeur
  arrimeuse
- arroi "array"
- assener "to strike" ( < a- + OFr sen "direction" < Gmc, cf OHG sinnan, Goth sinþan)
  assené
  assénement
- aste
- astic "polishing paste"
- asticot "small worm"
  astibloque
  astibloche
- asticoter "to tease, plague"
  asticotage
  asticoteur
- astiquer "to polish leather (with an astic)"
  astiquage
  astique
  astiqué
  astiqueur
- âtre "fireplace"
- attacher "to attach"
  attachement
  attachant
  attache
  attaché
  attachée
  attacheur
  attacheuse
  rattacher
  soustacher
  détachement
- attaquer "to attack"
  attaquabilité
  attaquable
  attaquant
  attaquante
  attaque
  attaqué
  attaqueur
- attifer "to adorn the head" ( < Frk *tipp-, tipf- < Gmc *tupp- "point", cf OHG tipfōn "to decorate", ON *tippa, MDu tip "point")
  attifage
  attifé
  attifement
  attifet
  attifeur
  attifeuse
  attifiaux
- attignole
- attirer "to attract"
  attirail
  attirable
  attirance
  attirant
  attirement
- attoucher "to touch, contact"
  attouchement "touch, contact"
- attraper "to trap, catch"
  attrape
  attrapé
  attrapable
  attrapade
  attrapage
  attrapeur
  attrapeuse
  attrapoire
  attrape-gogo (also attrape-gogos)
  attrape-mouche (also attrape-mouches)
  attrape-nigaud
- attrouper "to assemble, gather"
  attroupé
  attroupement
- aubère
- auberge "inn"
- auberger
- aubergerie
- aubergiste
- aubert
- aubète (also aubette)
- auburn
- -aud (also -aut) agent suffix ( < OFr -aud < LL -aldus < Frk *-wald < Gmc)
  -aude
- aulne (also aune)
  aulnage (also aunage)
  aulnette
- aune "an ell" (< Ofr alne < LL alena < Goth aleina < Gmc, cf OE eln "ell)
  auner
- auner
  aunée
  auneur
  aunnage
- aurochs
- auto-stop
- autoguidage
- autoguidé
- auvent "penthouse", ″awning″ ( < ML auventus < Prov emban < ambitus + bann < Gmc)
- avachir "to become limp"
  avachi
  avachissant
  avachissement
- avant-garde
  avant-gardisme
  avant-gardiste
- avant-guerre
- avion-stop

== B ==
- baba
- babiller "to babble, chatter" ( < Gmc, cf ME babelen (Eng babble), ON babbla, Dut babbelen, Germ babbeln)
  babil
  babillard
  babillarde
  babillage
  babillement
  babillant
  babillerie
  babillet
  babilleur
  babilleuse
- babine "lip, mouth, chops" ( < bab "lip, grimace" < Gmc, cf Germ dial Bäppe)
- bâbord "portside, larboard"
  bâbordais
- babouin "baboon, monkey" ( < bab "lip, grimace" < Gmc, cf Germ dial Bäppe)
  babouine
  babouiner
- baby
  baby-foot
- bac "ferry-boat"
- bacante (also bacantes) "beard, moustache" ( < Germ Backe "cheek" < Gmc)
- bâche "awning, frame" ( < Wallon batche "board, plank < Gmc, cf MFr bauche < Frk *balko "balk, balcony" < Gmc)
- bachot "wherry, small skiff"
  bachoter
  bachoteur
  bachoteuse
  bachotage
- backfisch (also backfish)
- bâcler "to close (a door or window) with a cross-beam" ( < MDu bakkelen "to cause to stay" < MDu bakken, backen "to cause to stick, make immovable, prop" < Gmc)
  bâclage
  bâclé
  bâcleur
  bâcleuse
  débâcler
  débâcle
- bacon
- baconien
  baconienne
  baconianisme
- bada
  badaboum
- badge
- badigeon "stone-colored" ( < Germ Batzen "paste, a kneaded mass" < Gmc)
  badigeonner
  badigeonnage
  badigeonneur
- badigoinces
- badingouin
  badingouine
- badingredin
  badingredine
- badingueusard
  badingueusarde
- badingueux
  badingueuse
- badminton
- baedeker
- baffouer "to baffle"
  baffouage
  baffouement
  baffoueur
- bâfrer
  bâfrerie
  bâfreur
- bagage "baggage"
  bagagiste
- bagarre "fray, tumult" ( < MFr bagarot "noise, tumult, contention, strife" < Gmc, cf OHG bâga "dispute", OHG bâgan "to argue", ON bagga "to hinder, prevent")
  bagarrer
  bagarreur
- bagoter (also bagotter)
- bagotte
- bague "ring"
  bagues
  baguer
- baguer "to ring"
  bagué
  baguage
  bagueur
  baguier
- bahut "chest, trunk" ( < Frk *baghūdi, baghōdi "protection, sideboard" < bage "bag, pack" < Gmc + hūdi, hōdi "protection" < Gmc, cf MHG behut "hutch, cupboard")
  bahuter
- bahuter
  bahuté
  bahutier
- balafre "a gash, a long notch" ( < OFr balefre < Frk *bal-leffur < Gmc, cf OHG leffur "lip")
  balafrer
- balafrer
  balafré
- balandre (also bélandre)
- balbuzard
- balcon "balcony"
  balcon-terrasse
  balconnage
  balconnet
- balèvre
- ball-trap
- ballast
  ballaster
- ballaster
  ballastage
  ballastière
- balle "ball"
  baller
  ballon
  ballot
- balle (also bale, bâle) "package" ( < Frk *balla < Gmc, cf OHG balo, MHG balle, Germ Ballen "bundle")
  déballer
  emballer
- ballon "balloon"
  ballon-prisonnier
  ballon-sonde
  ballonner
  ballonnet
- ballonner
  ballonné
  ballonnement
  ballonnant
  ballonnier
- ballot "package"
  ballotter
  balluche
- ballotte
  ballottine
- ballotter
  ballottage
  ballottade
  ballotté
  ballottement
  ballotteur
  ballotteuse
- balluche (also baluche)
  balluchon
  balluchard
  ballucharde
- ban "ban"
  forban
  bandon
  banal
  banale
- banal "banal"
  banalité
  banaliser
- banale
  banalement
- banaliser
  banalisation
- banc "bench"
  banable
  bancaire
  bancal
  bancale
  bancasse
  bancelle
  banquet
  banquette
- bancal "bandy-legged"
- banche
  bancher
- bancher
- banché
- banco
- bancocrate
  bancocratie
- bancroche
- bancruche
- bande "band"
  bandeau
  bandellette
  bander
  bande-son
  bandereau
- bande "troop"
  banderille
  banderiller
  banderillero
- bander "to bandage"
  bandage
  bandagiste
  bandé
  bandaison
- banderole "streamer, banderole"
  banderoler
  banderolé
- bandière "banner"
- bandit "bandit"
  banditisme
- bandolier "bandolier"
- bandoline
- bandonéon
- bandoulier
- bandoulière "bandoleer"
- bandure
- bang
- bank-note
- banlieue "suburbs"
  banlieusard
  banlieusarde
- banlon
- bannière "banner"
  banneret
- bannir "to bannish"
  banni
  bannissable
  bannissement
- banque "bank"
  banquer
  banquier
  banquereau
- banqueroute "bankruptcy"
  banqueroutier
  banqueroutière
- banquet "banquet"
  banqueter
  banquet-souvenir
  banquetage
  banqueteur
  banquette
- banquezingue
- banquier
- banquière
- banquise
- banquisme
- banquiste
- banvin
- baquet "tub"
  baqueter
- baqueter
  baquetage
- bar (Zoo.) "sea bass"( < Dut barse, baerse "pole, bar" < Gmc)
- barbet "barbet spaniel"
- bard "litter, hand-barrow"
  barder
  bardeur
  débarder
  débardeur
- barge (Zoo.) ( < Prov barja "chatter" < Gmc *brekan)
- barguigner "to haggle" ( < OFr bargaigner < Frk *borganjan < Gmc *borgan, cf OE borgian "to borrow")
  barguignade
  barguignage
  barguigneur
  barguigneuse
- barigel ( < Ital barigello < LL barigildus < Lomb barigild < Gmc)
- baril "barrel" ( < OFr baril < Frk *baril, beril "barrel, jug, container" or Burg *berils "container, bearer", both < Gmc *berila-z "container, jug" < *beranan "to carry, transport" + *-ilaz agent/instrumental suffix, cf ON berill "barrel for liquids", OHG biril "large pot", OS biril "basket", Frk *bera "stretcher", OE beran "to carry")
  barillage
  barillet
- barmaid
- barman
- baron "baron"
  baronne
  baronner
  baronnet
  baronnie
  baronifier
  baronial
  baronnial
  baroniser
- baronner
  baronnage
  baronnerie
- barouf ( < Ital baruffa < baruffare < Lomb *bihrōffjan < Gmc, cf OHG bihruofjan)
  baroufe
- bas-bleu

- bas-bleuisme

- bas-flanc
- bas-hauban
- bas-mât
- base-ball
- basedowien
  basedowienne
- basketball
  basketteur
  basketteuse
- basque "skirt" ( < Prov basto < Frk*bastjan < Gmc)
- bastardon
- bastide "house in the country, villa"
  bastidon
- bastille "fortress, Bastille"
  bastillé
  bastillonné
- basting
- bastingage (also bastingages) "netting"
  bastingue
  bastinguer
- bastion "bastion"
  bastionner
- bastionner
  bastionné
- bastringuer ( < Dut bas drinken < Gmc)
  bastringue
- bat-flanc
- bâtard "bastard"
  bâtarde
  bâtardise
  bâtardeau
  bâtarder
- batardeau "dyke"
- bateau "boat"
  bateau-citerne
  bateau-feu
  bateau-lavoir
  bateau-mouche
  bateau-phare
  bateau-pilote
  bateau-pompe
  bateau-porte
  bateau-stop
  batelet
  bateler
- bateler
  batelage
  batelier
  batelière
  batellerie
  batelée
- bath
- bâtir "to build"
  bâti
  bâtiment
  bâtisse
  bâtissable
  bâtissage
  bâtisseur
  bâtisseuse
  bastille
- bâtir "to baste"
- batz
- bau
- baud ( < Frk *bald < Gmc, cf OHG bald, OE beald)
- baudet "donkey"
- baudir ( < Frk *baldjan < Gmc, cf OE bieldan)
- baudrier "baldric"
- baudroie
  baudroyeur
- baudrucher "to prepare leather"
  baudruche
- bauge "lair"
  bauger
  baugé
- baugue (also bauque)
- bazooka ( < Eng bazooka < bazoo "boastful talk" < Dut bazuin "trumpet")
- be-bop
- beatnik
- beaupré "bowsprit"
- bébé "baby" ( < Eng baby < ME babe, baban)
- bedeau "beadle"
- beethovenien
  beethovenienne
- beffroi "belfry"
- bégard
- béguin "fancy"
  béguine
  béguinette
  béguiner
  bégard
- béguinos
- béguiner
  béguinage
  béguinerie
- behaviorisme (also behaviourisme)
- behavioriste (also behaviouriste)
- beigne
  beignet "beignet, fritter"
- bélandre "bilander"
- bélier "ram, bellwether"
  bélière
- bélière "clapper-ring"
- bélître "scoundrel"
- bénard
  bénarde
- bénoche
- berce
- berdiner
  berdin
- bergame ( < Bergamo < L bergomum < Lig berg "mountain" < Gmc *bergaz "mountain"; also attributed to berg + haim "home")
  bergamasque
  bergamine
- berlaud
- berline "berlin"
- berlingot
- berlingue
- berlinois
  berlinoise
- berme "berm"
- bernard l'ermite (also bernard l'hermite)
  bernard lermite (also bernard lhermite)
- bernardin
  bernardine
- berne "to swaddle" ( OFr berne "cloth" < MDu berme "edge, hem" < Gmc)
  berner
- bernesque (also berniesque)
- bertha
- berthe
- berthelée
- berthelet
- besogne "business, work"
  besogner
  besogneux
- besogner
  besognement
- besoin "need"
  besoigneux
- best-seller
- biaude
- biche "small dog" ( < Gmc, cf OE bicce "bitch", ON bikkia, Germ Betze, Peize)
  bichon
  bichonne
  bichonner
  bichonnage
- bichet
- bicot
- bide
- bidon "can, jug" ( < Norm bide < ON *bida "container" < Gmc)
  bidonier
  bidonier
  bidonne
  bidonner
  bidonnier
  bidonville
  bide
- bidule
- bief "mill-race"
- bière "beer"
- bière "bier" ( < Frk *bera < Gmc, cf OHG bara "litter")
- bièvre "beaver"
- biez "mill-race"
- bifteck "steak"
  bifteckifère
- bighorn
- bigle "beagle"
- bigot "bigot" ( < MFr < OFr bigot "derogatory word applied to Normans" < OE bi Gode "by God" < Gmc)
  bigote
  bigotement
  bigoterie
  bigotisme
  abigoter
- bigre
  bigrement
- bilboquet "a cup and ball"
- billiard "billiards"
  billarder
- bille "small ball" ( < OFr bille "small ball" < Frk *bikkil < Gmc, cf OHG bickel "die, ossicle", Dut bikkel "ossicle")
  billiard
  biller
  billebaude
  billette
- bique "she-goat"
  biquet
  biquette
- bire
- bis "brown" ( < Frk *bīsi < Gmc)
- bisant
- biscôme
- biscoter
- bise "bise, north wind"
  biser
  bisant
- bismuth "bismuth"
- bison "bison"
- bissel
- bistre "bistre"
- bit
- bitte ( < ON biti < Gmc)
  bitter
  bitture (also biture)
  bitton
  débit
  débiter
- bivouac "bivouac"
  bivaquer
  bivouaquer
- blackball (also blacboule, blackboule)
  blackbouler
- black-bass
- black-bottom
- black-out
- black-rot
- blackbouler
  blackboulé
  blackboulage
- blafard "pallid, wan"
  blafardement
- blague
  blaguer
- blaguer
  blagueur
  blagueuse
- blaireau "badger"
- blanc "white, blank" ( < OFr blanc < Frk *blank < Gmc *blanka- blinding, white, cf OHG blanch, OE blanca)
  blanc-bec
  blanc-de-baleine
  blanc-éstoc (also blanc-étoc)
  blanc-manger
  blanc-nez
  blanc-seeing
  blanchaille
  blanche
  blanchecaille
  blanchette
  blanchiment
  blanchoyer
  blanco
  blancs-manteaux
  blanque
  blanquet (also blaquet)
  blanquisme
  blanquiste
  blanchet
  blancher
  blanchâtre
  blanchir
  blanquette
- blanchir
  blanchi
  blanchissage
  blanchissant
  blanchissement
  blanchisserie
  blanchisseur
  blanchisseuse
- blancher
  blancheur
  blanchement
  blancherie
- blaquet
- blaser "to satiate, cloy, blunt"
  blase
  blasé
  blasement
  blason
- blason "coat of arms"
  blasonner
- blasonner
  blasonné
- blatérer "to bleat" ( < partly from Lat blaterare "to chatter" and partly from Frk *blātan "to bleat, cry like a sheep" < Gmc, cf OHG blāzan "to bleat", Dut blaten, OE blǣtan)
  blatèrement
- blatier "cornfactor" ( < LL *bladarius < Gmc *blada-)
- blatte
- blaude
- blave
  blavin
- blaze
- blé "wheat, grain"
  blaireau
  blatier
  bléer
- blèche "soft"
- bléer
- bleime
- blême "pale" ( < OFr blesme < blesmir "to turn pale" < Frk blesmjan "to make pale" < Gmc)
  blémir
- blémir
  blêmeur
  blêmissant
  blêmissement
- blende
- blesser "to wound" ( < OFr < Frk *blettjan < Gmc, cf OHG bleizza "bruise")
  blessé
  blessée
  blessant
  blessable
  blessure
  blessement
- blet "over-ripe" ( < Gmc *blada-)
  blette
  blettir (also blétir)
- blettir (also blétir)
  blettissement
- bleu "blue" ( < OFr bleu, blo(u), blao < Frk *blao < Gmc *blǣwaz, cf OHG blāo, OE blāw)
  bleuir
  bleuâtre
  bleuâtrement
  bleue
  bleuet
  bleuette
  bleuir
  bleusaille
  bleuter
- bleuir
  bleueur
  bleui
  bleuie
  bleuissement
  bleuissure
  bleuité
- bleuter
  bleuté
  bleutée
  bleuterie
- bliaud (also bliaut)
- blinde (also blindes) "sheeting" ( < Germ Blende < Gmc)
  blinder
- blinder
  blindé
  blindage
- blinquer
- blitz
- blizzard
- bloc "block" ( < OFr bloc < MDu bloc "tree-trunk" or OHG bloc, bloh < Gmc *bluk-)
  bloquer
  bloc-notes (also block-notes)
  blocage
  blocaille
  blocard
  blocarde
  blochet
  débloquer
- blockhaus "blockhouse" ( < Germ Blockhaus < Gmc)
- blocus "blockade; investment" ( < Germ dial blockhuis < Gmc)
- blond "blond" ( < OFr blond, blont < ML blundus < Frk *blund < Gmc *bland-, cf OE blondenfeax "grey-haired")
  blonde
  blondin
  blondir
  blonder
  blondasse
  blondement
  blondiche
  blondoyer
- blondasse
  blondasserie
- blonder
  blonderie
  blondeur
- blondin
  blondine
  blondinet
  blondinette
- blondir
  blondi
  blondinet
- blondoyer
  blondoiement
- bloom
  blooming
- bloquer
  bloque
  bloqué
  bloquette
  bloqueur
- blot
- blottir "to crouch, squat" ( < Germ blotten < Gmc, cf OHG blotzen "to crush", Dut blutsen "to contuse, injure")
  blotti
  blottissement (also blotissement)
- blouse "bump" ( < Dut bluts < Gmc)
  blouser
- blouse "blouse" ( < *vêtement de laine blouse < Prov (lano) blouso "pure (wool)" < OHG blōz "empty, naked, pure" < Gmc *blauta-, cf OE blēat "poor")
  blouse-tunique
  blouser
  blouson
  blousier
- blouser
  blousé
- blue-jean
- blues
- bluet
  bluette
  bluetter
- bluff
  bluffer
- bluffer
  bluffeur
  bluffeuse
- bluter "to bolt" ( < MHG biuteln "to bolt" < biūtel < Gmc, cf MDu buydelen, budelen, Dut builen)
  blutage
  bluteau
  bluterie
  bluteur
  blutoir
- bob
- bobard
  bobardier
- bobèche "socket"
  bobècherie
  bobéchon
- bobelet (also bobsleigh, bob)
- bobine "bobbin"
  bobiner
  bobinard
  bobineau
  bobinet
  bobinette
  bobinier
  bobinière
  bobinoir
  bobinot
- bobiner
  bobiné
  bobineur
  bobineuse
  bobinage
- bobosse
- bocage "thicket, grove" ( < OFr boscage < L boscaticum < L boscum, buscum "bush, wood" < Gmc *buskaz)
  bocager
  bocagère
  bocageux
- bocambre
- bocard
  bocarder
  bocardage
  bocage (also boccage)
- boche
- bochiman (also boschiman)
  bochimane (also boschimane)
- bock
  bockeur
- boggie (also bogie)
- boghei (also boguet, buggy)
- bogue "chain, ring of iron" ( < N. Ital boga < Lomb bauga "ring" < Gmc, cf OE bēag "ring")
- boier
- bois "wood" ( < OFr < L *boscum, buscum < Gmc *buskaz)
  hautbois
  boiser
  deboiser
  reboiser
  bouquet
  boisure
- boiser
  boisé
  boisage
  boiserie
  boisement
  boiseur
  boiseux
- bol "bowl" ( < Eng bowl < OE bolla < Gmc *bul-)
  bolaire
- bombance "feast"
  bombancer
  bombancier
- bon-henri
- bonbanc
- bonde "floodgate, sluice" ( < Swab bunte < Gmc, cf MHG bunde)
  bondon
  bonder
  bondard
  débonder
- bonder
  bondé
- bondon
  bondonner
- bonnet "bonnet" ( < OFr bonet "material for hats" < Frk *bunni < Gmc *bund-)
  bonneter
  bonnetier
  bonnetière
  bonneteau
  bonneton
  bonnette
- bonneter
  bonnetade
  bonneteur
  bonneterie
  boogie-woogie
- book
  bookmaker
- boom
- booléien (also booléen)
  booléienne (also booléenne)
- bootlegger
- boqueteau
- boquillon
  boquillonne
  boquillonner
- bord "edge, border"
  border
  bordure
  aborder
  déborder
  rebord
  bordereau
  bordailler
  bordayer
  borde
  bordeaux
  bordel
  bordière
  bordigue
- bordel
  bordelais
  bordelaise
  bordelier
  bordelière
- border
  bordé
  bordée
  bordage
  borderie
- borgne "one-eyed" ( < L *bornius < *borna "hole, cavity" < Gmc, cf OHG borōn "to bore")
  borgnat (also borgniat)
  borgnesse
  borgnio
  borgnion
  borgniot
  borgnon
- bort
- bos (also boss) "boss"
- bochiman (also boschiman) "bushman"
  bochimane (also boschimane)
- bosel
- bosquet "thicket"
- bosse "hump" ( < Frk *bottja < Frk *bōtan "to strike, beat" < Gmc)
  bosser
  bossu
  bossue
  bossuer
  bosseler
  bossette
  bosseyeur
  bosseyeuse
  bossoir
- bosse "hawser"
  bosser
  bossoir
- bosseler
  bosselage
  bosselard (also bosselar)
  bosselé
  bossellement
  bosselure
- bosser
  bossage
  bossant
  bossard
  bosseur
  bosseuse
- bossuer
  bossuage
  bossué
- bosseman "boatswain's mate"
- boston
  bostonner
- bot "club-foot" (also bote)
- botte "truss, bundle" ( < Gmc, cf OHG bōzo "bundle, fagot")
  botteler
  bottelette
  bottillon
- botte "butt, leather bottle, boot" ( < Gmc, cf Germ Bütte)
  botter
  bottier
  bottine
  bottillon
- botte "lunge, thrust" ( < Ital botta < bottare < Fr bouter < Gmc)
- botte "tuft" ( < Dut bote < Gmc)
- botteler
  bottelage
  bottelé
  bottelée
  botteleur
  botteleuse
  bottelier
  botteloir
- botter
  botté
  bottée
  botteur
- bottine "half-boot"
  bottinette
- bouc "buck, male goat" ( < OFr bouc "male goat" < Frk *bukk < Gmc *bukkon, cf OE bucca "male goat", OE buc "male deer", OHG boc "male goat", ON bokkr "buck")
  boucage
  boucaille
  boucan
  boucaut
  bouquetin
  bouquin
  boucher
- boucan
  boucane
  boucaner
  boucanier
- boucaner
  boucanage
  boucané
- boucharde
  boucharder
- boucharder
  bouchardage
  bouchardeuse
- boucher "butcher"
  boucherie
- boucher "to stop up, block" ( < bousche "faggot, straw handle" < LL *bosca "undergrowth, beam of branches" < bosci "wood" < Gmc)
  bouchage
  bouché
  bouche-trou
  bouchée
  bouchement
  bouchère
  boucheton
  boucheton à
  boucheur
  bouchoir
  bouchon
  bouchure
  déboucher
  débouché
- bouchon "whisp of straw" ( < bousche "faggot, straw handle" < LL *bosca "undergrowth, beam of branches" < bosci "wood" < Gmc)
  bouchonner
  bouchonnier
- bouchonner
  bouchonnage
  bouchonné
  bouchonnement
  bouchonneux
- bouder ( < Wall boder "to swell" < Gmc, cf MLG buddich "swollen", ME budde "bud", ON budda "purse", OS budil "bag, purse", Goth bauþs "section")
  boudeur
  boudeuse
  bouderie
  boudeusement
  boudin
  boudoir
- boudin
  boudiner
  boudinier
  boudinière
- boudiner
  boudinage
  boudine
  boudiné
  boudinée
  boudinement
  boudineuse
- bouffer "to puff" ( < OFr buffier < Gmc, cf MDu puffen, LG pof, puf "a puff", OE pyffan "to puff")
  bouffant
  bouffante
  bouffard
  bouffarde
  bouffe
  bouffée
  bouffette
  bouffeur
  bouffeuse
  bouffir
- bouffard
  bouffarde
  bouffarder
- bouffir
  bouffi
  bouffie
  bouffissure
- bouffon
  bouffonne
  bouffonner
  bouffonesque (also bouffonnesque)
  bouffoniste (also bouffonniste)
  bouffonnade
- bouffonner
  bouffonnant
  bouffonnement
  bouffonnerie
- bouée "buoy" ( < MFr boie, boue(e) < Frk *baukan "beacon" < Gmc *baukn, cf OHG bouhhan, OFris bāken "beacon")
- bougon "grumbling"
  bougonner
- bougonner
  bougonnade
  bougonnage
  bougonnement
  bougonnerie
  bougonneur
  bougonneuse
- boujon "arrow" ( < OFr bulzun "arrow" < Frk *bultjo "bolt" < Gmc, cf MHG bolz, Dut bolt)
  boujonner
- boulanger "baker" ( < OFr boulenc "baker" < Frk *bolla "bread" + -enc "-ing" < Gmc, cf OHG bolla "wheat flour", MDu bolle "round loaf")
  boulangerie
  boulangère
  boulangerie-pâtisserie
  boulangisme
  boulangiste
- bouledogue "bulldog"
- boulevard "boulevard" ( < OFr bollevart, boulevert, bouleverc "rampart converted to an avenue" < Walloon < MDu bolwerk, bollewerc "bulwark" < bolle, bol "bole, trunk, torso" < Gmc + werk "work" < Gmc)
  boulevarder
  boulevardier
  boulevardière
- boulevari (also boulvari) ( alt. < hourvari)
- boulin "putlog-hole" ( < Frk *bole "bowl" < Frk *bolla "bowl" < Gmc, cf OE bolla "bowl")
- bouline "bowline" ( < Eng bowline < Gmc)
  bouliner
  boulinette
  boulinier
  boulinière
- bouliner
  boulinage
- boulingrin "bowling green" ( < Eng < Gmc)
- boumer "to boom" ( < Gmc, cf Dut bommen "to boom", Germ bummen, ME bummen "to buzz")
  boum
- bouquet "bouquet" ( < OFr bousquet, bosquet < L *boscum, buscum < Gmc *buskaz "bush")
  bouqueter
  bouquetier
  bouquetière
- bouqueter
  bouqueté
- bouquetin
- bouquin "he-goat" ( < bouc < Gmc)
- bouquin "old book" ( < Dut boeckin "little book" < Dut boek "book" < Gmc + -kin < Gmc)
  bouquiner
  bouquiniste
  bouquinerie
- bouquiner
  bouquineur
- bourg "borough, town" ( < OFr burg, bourg, borg, borc < L burgus < Frk *burg < Gmc *burgs "fortress", cf OE burg "burgh, borough")
  bourg-épine
  bourgeois
  bourgade
  bourgadier
- bourgeois "citizen, burgher"
  bourgeoise
  bourgeoisie
  bourgeoisement
  bourgeoisant
  bourgeoisisme
- bourgeon "shoot, bud" ( < OFr burjon "sprout" < Gmc, cf OHG burjan "to lift, raise")
  bourgeonner
  ébourgeonner
  bourgeonneux
- bourgeonner
  bourgeonnant
  bourgeonnement
- bourgmestre "burgomaster, mayor"
- bourgogne
  bourguignon
  bourguignonne
  bourguignot (also bourguignote, bourguignotte)
- bourlinguer
  bourlingue
  bourlingueur
  bourlingueuse
- bourrir ( < Frk *būrjan < Gmc)
- bouscatier
- bousculer "to turn upside down"
  bousculade
  bousculant
  bousculé
  bousculement
  bousculeur
  bousculeuse
- bousin (also bouzin) ( < Eng bousing "strong drink" < MDu būsen "to drink" < Gmc)
  bousineur
  bousinier
  bousingot
- bousingot
  bousingotisme
- boustifailler
  boustifaille
  boustifailleur
- bout "end"
  bout-dehors (also boute-dehors)
  bout-rimé (also boute-rimé)
  bout-en-train "breeder-horse"
  bouter
  debout
  embouter
  aboutir
  boutasse
- bouter "to put, push"
  bouté
  boutée
  boutade "freak"
  boute
  boute-hors
  boute-selle
  boute-feu (also boutefeu) "linstock"
  bouture
  bouton
  boute-selle
  arc-boutant
  bouterolle
  bouteroue
  boutis
  boutisse
  bouture "cut, slip"
  boutoir
- bouterolle
  bouteroller
- bouton "button"
  bouton d'or
  boutonner
  déboutonner
  boutonnerie
  boutonnier
  boutonnière
- boutonner
  boutonnant
  boutonné
  boutonneux
- boutre
- bouture
  bouturer
- bouturer
  bouturage
- bow-window
- bowling
- box-calf
- boxer "to box" ( < Eng box < ME boxen "to box, beat", box "a blow" < Gmc, cf MDu boke "a blow", MHG buc "a blow", Dan bask "a blow")
  boxe
  boxeur
- boy
  boy-scout
  boycott
  boycotter
- boycotter
  boycottage
- braconner "to poach"
  braconnier
  braco
  braconnage
  braconné
  braconnière
- bracot
- brader
  braderie
  bradeur
  bradeuse
- bragard (also braguard)
  bragarde
- brague
  braguet
  braguette
- brai "tar residue" ( < Frk *bred "board" < Gmc)
- brailler "to brawl"
  braillard
- brain-trust
- braire "to bray"
  braiement
  brailler
- brailler
  braille
  braillant
  braillante
  braillard
  braillarde
  braillement
  brailleur
  brailleuse
  braiment
- braise "gleed, glowing embers"
  braiser
  braisière
  braisiller
- braiser
  braisé
- braisiller
  braisillant
  braisillement
- bramer "to bell" ( < Ital bramare < Prov bramar "to sing, shout", Goth bra(m)mon < Gmc *brammōn, cf MHG brummen "to thunder, roar", MLG brammen)
  bramant
  bramante
  bramée
  bramement
- brand (also brant)
  brandade
  brandir
- brande "heather"
  brandin
  brandine
- brandebourg "the frogs of a coat"
- brandevin "brandy"
  brandevinier
  brandevinière
- brandir "to brandish"
  brandi
  brandissage
  brandissement
  brandiller
- brandiller
  brandillant
  brandillement
  brandilloire
- brandon "piece of straw"
  brandonner
- brandy
- branler "to shake" ( < brandiller "shake a sword at" < OFr brandeler "wave a sword" < LL brandulare < Gmc, cf ON brandr "sword, brand")
  branle
  branlage
  branlant
  branlante
  branle-bas (also branlebas)
  branlée
  branlette
  branleur
  branleuse
  branloter (also branlotter)
  branloire
  branlement
  ébranler
- braque "brachhound; fool"
  braquer
  braquet
  bracon
  braconnier
- braquemart (also braquemard) "broadsword"
- braquer (Naut.) "to direct, point" ( < ON brāka "to fix, set on, weaken" < Gmc)
  braquage
  braqueur
  braquement
- braser
  brasage
  brasero
  brasier "brazier"
  brasière
  brasiller
  brasure
- brasiller
  brasillant
  brasillement
- brasque
  brasquer
- brayaud
- brayer ( < ON, OE brǣda "to tar" < Gmc, cf OS brādan, OHG brātan "to roast")
  débrayer
  embrayer
- brayon
- break
- break-water (also breack-water)
- breakfast
- brèche "breach, gap"
  brèche-dent
  bréchiforme
  ébrécher
- bréchet "brisket"
- brédissure
- bredouiller
  bredouillage
  bredouillant
  bredouillard
  bredouille
  bredouillé
  bredouillement
  bredouilleur
  bredouilleuse
  bredouillis
  bredouillon
- bréger
- brehaigne "barren" (also bréhaigne)
- brelan "brelan (a game of cards)"
  brelander
  brelandier
  brelandière
- brème "bream"
- brême
- brequin
- brésil
  brésiléine
  brésilien
  brésilienne
  brésiline
  brésillet
  brésiller "to cut into small pieces (of wood)"
- brésis (also brisis)
- brétailler
  brétailleur
- bretèche
  breteché (also bretesché)
  bretechée (also breteschée)
- bretelle "strap" ( < OFr < Frk *bredel, bredil "bridle, strap" < Gmc *bregþil-, cf OHG brittel, brittil "bridle", OHG brettan "to weave, braid", OE brīdel "bridle", OE bregdan "to braid, weave")
- brette "long sword" ( < ON bregþa < Gmc)
  bretailler
  brettelure
  bretter
  bretture
- bretter
  bretteur
- bretzel
- bricage
- bricheton
- bricole "breast band" ( < Ital briccola < Lomb brihhil < Gmc, cf MHG brëchel-, Germ brechen "to break")
  bricoler
  bricolier
- bricoler
  bricolage
  bricoleur
  bricoleuse
- bride "bridle"
  brider
  bridon
  débrider
- brider
  bridé
  bridoir
  bridure
- bridge
  bridger
- bridger
  bridgeur
  bridgeuse
- brie
  brié
  briée
- brightique
- brimbaler (also bringuebaler, briquebaler)
  brimbalant
  brimbale
  brimbalement
  brimbaleur
- brimbelle
- brimer
  brimé
  brimade
- brinde "a toast"
  brinder
  brindezingue
- bringue "festival, vice"
  bringuer "to toast"
- bringue "silly girl; manhunter" ( < Frk *springan "to jump" < Gmc)
- brioche "cake"
  brioché
- brique "brick"
  briquer
  briqueter
  briquage
  briquet
  briquette
- briquer
  briqué
- briqueter
  briqueté
  briquetage
  briqueterie
  briquetier
- brise "breeze"
  brise "a break, breaking"
  brise-bise
  brise-cou
  brise-glace
  brise-glaces
  brise-jet
  brise-lames
  brise-raison
  brise-tout
- briser "to break" ( < OFr bruisier, brisier < Frk *brusjan "to break" < Gmc *brusjanan "to crush, break", cf OHG bristan "to break", OE brȳsan "to crush, bruise")
  bris
  brise
  brisé
  brisée
  brisable
  brisant
  briseur
  briseuse
  brisement
  brisure
  brisis
  brisoir
- bristol
- brocanter "to deal in used goods"
  brocante
  brocantage
  brocanteur
  brocanteuse
- brocard "a taunt"
  brocarder
- brocarder
  brocardé
  brocardeur
  brocardeuse
- brodequin "sock, buskin" ( < Flem brosekin < Gmc)
- broder "embroider" ( < OFr brosder, broisder < Frk *brozdōn Gmc *bruzdajanan)
  brodé
  broderie
  brodeur
  brodeuse
- broie
  broiement
- broigne
- brosse "brush"
  brosser
  brosserie
  brossier
  brossière
  brossure
- brosser
  brossée
  brosseur
  brossage
- brou
- brouée
- brouet "broth"
- brouette "wheelbarrow" ( < Wal berouette < Wal beroue < Gmc *berwaz, cf OE bearwe "wheelbarrow", MHG bere)
  brouetter
  brouettier
- brouetter
  brouettage
  brouettée
  brouetteur
  brouetteuse
- brougham
- brouillard "fog" ( < brouiller < Gmc)
- brouiller "to embroil, mingle" ( < OFr broiller < L *brodiculare < L *brodum < Gmc *bruþan, cf OE broþ "broth", OE brēowan "to brew")
  brouillé
  brouilleur
  brouilleuse
  brouillement
  brouillage
  brouille
  brouillerie
  brouillon
  débrouiller
  embrouiller
  brouillard
  brouillardeux
  brouillasser
  brouilleux
  brouillis
- brouillasser
  brouillasse
  brouillassé
- brouillon
  brouillonne
  brouillonner
- brouir "to blight" ( < OFr broīr < Frk *brājan < Gmc)
  broui
  brouissure
- broussaille (also broussailles) "brushwood"
  broussailleux
- brousse "undergrowth"
- brousse ( < Prov broce "curdled milk" < Goth gabrūka "piece" < brūkja "what is broken" < Gmc)
  brousser
  broussard
  broussin
- broussin
- brout "sprouts, young shoots"
  brouter
  broutille
- brouter
  broutage
  broutant
  broutement
  brouteur
  brouteuse
- broutille
  broutiller
- brownien
- browning
- broyer "to crush, grind" ( < Lat *bricare < Frk *brikan "to break" < Gmc *brekanan)
  broyage
  broyat
  broie
  broiement
  broyeur
  broyeur-mélangeur
  broyeuse
  broyon
- bru "daughter-in-law"
- bruccio
- brugeois
  brugeoise
- bruges
- brugnon
- brûle-pourpoint
- brûler "to burn" ( < OFr brusler "to burn" < conflation of OFr bruir "to burn" < Frk *brōjan "to burn, scald" < Gmc, cf MHG brüejen "to burn, scald" + OFr usler < Lat ustulare "to scorch")
  brûlé
  brûlée
  brûlable
  brûlage
  brûlant
  brûleur
  brûleuse
  brûlement
  brûlerie
  brûlis
  brûloir
  brûlure
  brûlot
  brûle-bout
  brûle-gueule
  brûle-parfum
  brûle-parfums
  brûle-pourpoint
  brûle-pourpoint à
  brûle-tout
- brûlot
  brûlotier
- brun "brown"
  brune
  brunet
  brunette
  brunelle
  brunir
  brunâtre
  embrunir
  rembrunir
- brunir
  bruni
  brunie
  brunante
  brunante à la
  brunissage
  brunissant
  brunissement
  brunisseur
  brunisseuse
  brunissoir
  brunissure
- brusque "brisk" ( < Ital brusco < OHG bruttisc "dark, annoyed" < Gmc)
  brusquer
  brusquerie
  brusquement
  brusquet
- buander
  buanderie
  buandier
  buandière
- bucail
  bucaille
- bûche "log" ( < OFr busche < Prov busca < Lat busca, bosca < Gmc *buska-)
  bûcher
  bûcheron
  bûchement
  bûchette
- bûcher
  bûché
  bûcheur
  bûcheuse
  bûchage
- bûcheron
  bûcheronne
  bûcheronner
- bûcheronner
  bûcheronnage
- buée "lye" ( < buer "to wash" < Frk *būkōn "to wash" < Gmc, cf MLG būken "to soak in lye", MHG būchen, ME bouken "to buck, wash in lye")
  buer
  buée
  bue
  buander
- bugne
- building
- buis "bush"
  buiser
  buissière
  buisson
- buisson
  buissonner
  buissonnier
  buissonnière
  buissonnement
  buissonneux
  école buissonnière
- buissonner
  buissonnant
  buissonnage
- bull-dog
- bull-finch
- bull-terrier
- bulldozer
- bunker
- buquer
- burette "cruet"
- burg
- burgonde
- burgrave "burgrave"
  burgraviat
- burin "a graver" ( < Ital borino < Lomb *boro, borin- < Gmc, cf Germ bohren)
  buriner
  buriniste
  burinos
- buriner
  buriné
  burineur
  burinage
- busard
- busc "busk"
  busquer
  busquière
- buse "pipe, cavity" ( < OFr buise < Gmc, cf Dut buis)
  buser
  busette
- business
  businessman
- busquer "to search for, look for"
  busqué
  busquière
- busserole
- but "mark, aim"
  buter
  bute
- buter "to strike, aim"
  butant
  buté
  butée
  buteur
  butière
  débuter
  début
  rebuter
  rebut
  butoir
- butin "booty"
  butiner
- butiner
  butinage
  butinant
  butiné
  butinement
  butineur
  butineuse
- butte "butte"
  butte-témoin
  butter
  buttoir
- butter
  buttage
  butté
  butteur
  butteuse

== See also ==
- History of French
- Old Frankish
- Franks
- List of Spanish words of Germanic origin
- List of Portuguese words of Germanic origin
- List of Galician words of Germanic origin
- List of French words of Gaulish origin
