= RoadKillOvercoat =

Studio album by Busdriver
- Released: January 30, 2007
- Genre: Hip-hop
- Length: 43:22
- Label: Epitaph
- Producers: Nobody; Boom Bip; Busdriver; Bianca Casady

Busdriver chronology
Fear of a Black Tangent (2005)	RoadKillOvercoat (2007)	Jhelli Beam (2009)

Singles from RoadKillOvercoat
- 1. "Kill Your Employer (Recreational Paranoia Is the Sport of Now)" Released: 2006; 2. "Sun Shower" Released: 2007

RoadKillOvercoat is the fifth studio album by American rapper Busdriver. It was released on Epitaph Records in 2007.

== Critical reception ==
Professional ratings
Aggregate scores
Source	Rating
Metacritic	68/100
Review scores
Source	Rating
AllMusic	3/5 stars
Robert Christgau	(3-star Honorable Mention)
Cokemachineglow	71/100
Exclaim!	mixed
Pitchfork	6.9/10
Spin	mixed
Stylus Magazine	B+
XLR8R	favorable

At Metacritic, which assigns a weighted average score out of 100 to reviews from mainstream critics, the album received an average score of 68, based on 13 reviews, indicating "generally favorable reviews".

Jason Crock of Pitchfork gave the album a 6.9 out of 10, saying, "Nobody and Boom Bip provide beats that draw from a wider range of styles and flirt with an alien, psychedelic edge, giving Busdriver enough room to be as weird as he wants to be."

Jeff Shaw of City Pages placed it at number 10 on the "Top 10 Albums of 2007" list.

== Track listing ==
No.	Title	Producer(s)	Length
1.	"Casting Agents and Cowgirls"	Nobody	3:17
2.	"Less Yes's, More No's"	Nobody	4:21
3.	"Kill Your Employer (Recreational Paranoia Is the Sport of Now)"	Boom Bip	3:50
4.	"Ethereal Driftwood"	Busdriver; Nobody	3:43
5.	"Secret Skin"	Nobody	3:28
6.	"Sun Shower"	Boom Bip	4:08
7.	"Go Slow" (featuring Bianca Casady)	Busdriver; Bianca Casady	3:06
8.	"The Troglodyte Wins"	Nobody	3:22
9.	"Pompous Posies! Your Party's No Fun"	Nobody	3:10
10.	"(Bloody Paw on the) Kill Floor"	Boom Bip	3:12
11.	"Mr. Mistakes (Bested by the Whisper Chasm)"	Nobody	4:02
12.	"Dream Catcher's Mitt"	Boom Bip	3:43
Total length:			43:22

== Personnel ==
Credits adapted from liner notes.

- Busdriver – vocals, production (4, 7)
- Nobody – production (1, 2, 4, 5, 8, 9, 11)
- Boom Bip – production (3, 6, 10, 12), vocals (12)
- Bianca Casady – vocals (7), production (7)
- Isaiah Ikey Owens – synthesizer (11)
- Yadira Brown – vocals (12)
- Seripop – design
