= Jeremiah Jae =

American rapper (born 1989)

- Born: Jeremy Tynes Irving; June 7, 1989 (age 37); Chicago, Illinois, U.S.
- Genres: Hip-hop
- Occupations: Rapper; record producer; songwriter
- Years active: 2007–present
- Labels: Warp; Brainfeeder; Mello Music
- Website: www.jeremiahjae.info

Jeremy Tynes Irving (born June 7, 1989), known as Jeremiah Jae, is an American rapper and record producer from Chicago.

== Early life ==
Jae was born in Chicago, Illinois, on June 7, 1989. He is the son of jazz composer and musician Robert Irving III. He grew up in a musical home studying classical piano and guitar. He also taught himself the drums and played in various bands.

== Career ==
While a teenager, he formed Young Black Preachers (YBP) with his god-brothers, Tre Smith and Aaron "Projeck" Butler, and released a number of EPs alongside his solo work. This output and his Lunch Special mixes drew the attention of Steve Ellison, aka Flying Lotus, and led to Jae's move to Los Angeles in 2007.

After spending 6 months involving himself in the Los Angeles beat scene, and meeting the rest of the Brainfeeder roster, Jae was signed to the imprint. Following the release of Dxnce, Jae's debut Brainfeeder project Rappayamatantra was released in 2011. Throughout that time, Jae continued the Lunch Special series and contributed beats to the Captain Murphy mixtape Duality.

Having toured extensively with label mate Teebs, Jae released his debut album, Raw Money Raps, in 2012. In 2013, Jae released the Bad Jokes mixtape featuring members of the Black Jungle Squad and production from Jae himself, Jonwayne, Oliver the 2nd, and Flying Lotus.

The Night Took Us In like Family, his first collaborative album with producer L'Orange, was released on Mello Music Group in 2015. Their second collaborative album, Complicate Your Life with Violence, was released on Mello Music Group in 2019.

== Discography ==
=== Studio albums ===
- Raw Money Raps (2012)
- Rawhyde (2013) (with Oliver the 2nd)
- Gesus (2013) (with Young Black Preachers)
- The Night Took Us In like Family (2015) (with L'Orange)
- Daffi (2018)
- Complicate Your Life with Violence (2019) (with L'Orange)

=== Compilation albums ===
- Yard Sale (2012)
- Yard Sale 2 (2013)
- Yard Sale 3 (2014)
- Yard Sale 4 (2015)

=== Mixtapes ===
- Lunch Special (2008)
- Eating Donuts & Other Refined Foods (2010)
- Lunch Special 2 (2011) (with Black Jungle Squad)
- Lunch Special 3 (2011) (with Young Black Preachers)
- Lunch Special 4 (2011)
- Ignorant Prayers (2012) (with Azizi Gibson)
- Black Jungle Radio (2013) (with Black Jungle Squad)
- Black Castle (2013)
- Bad Jokes (2013)
- Good Times (2014)
- JP Moregun (2016) (with PBDY, as JP Moregun)

=== EPs ===
- YBP (2008) (with Young Black Preachers)
- Dxnce (2009)
- Rappayamantantra (2011)
- Dirty Collections Vol. 1 (2013)
- Dirty Collections Vol. 2 (2013)
- Dirty Collections Vol. 3 (2013)
- Holy Smoke (2013) (with Zeroh, as Holy Smoke)
- Pennies (2014) (with Cohenbeats)
- The Decline of Black Anakin (2015)
- A Cold Night (2016)
- When Daffi Attacks (2017)

=== Singles ===
- "Friends 1111" (2012)
- "New Day" b/w "Rawmoney Shit" (2013)

=== Guest appearances ===
- Captain Murphy - "Gone Fishing", "Immaculation", and "Jalapeños" from Duality (2012)
- Jonwayne - "Side A" from Cassette (2013)
- Jonwayne - "Mean Muggin", "Blaq Prussian" and "Dog It" from Cassette 3: The Marion Morrison Mixtape (2013)
- L'Orange - "Love Letter" from The Orchid Days (2014)
- Mast - "The Waters" from Omni (2014)
- Kwes. - "Hives II" from ilpix (2014)
- Slime - "Patricia's Stories" from In the Brick House (2014)
- Slime - "Patricia's Stories" from Company (2015)
- Busdriver - "Shadows and Victories" from Thumbs (2015)
- Samiyam - "Lord of the Rings" from Animals Have Feelings (2016)
- Pink Siifu - "Peace God" from Ensley (2018)

=== Productions ===
- Gonjasufi - "Kobwebz (Jeremiah Jae Remix)" from The Caliph's Tea Party (2010)
- Captain Murphy - "The Ritual", "Jalapeños" and "Gloe" from Duality (2012)
- Oliver the 2nd - The Kill Off (2013)
- Open Mike Eagle - "A History of Modern Dance" from Dark Comedy (2014)
- Busdriver - "Ego Death" from Perfect Hair (2014)
- Busdriver - "Shadows and Victories" from Thumbs (2015)
