= Control-Alt-Delete (disambiguation) =

Control-Alt-Delete (abbreviated as Ctrl-Alt-Del) is a combination of keys used for special computer commands.

It may also refer to:

- "Control-Alt-Delete" (Person of Interest), an episode of the TV series Person of Interest
- Control Alt Delete (film), a 2008 comedy film
- Ctrl Alt Delete (album), a Hip Hop album by producer Free the Robots
- Ctrl+Alt+Del (webcomic), a gaming-related webcomic
- "Ctrl + Alt + Del", a 2021 song by Rêve
- "Control-Alt-Delete", an episode of Power Rangers RPM
- "Control Alt Delete", the 29th episode of the 2022 superhero TV series Transformers: EarthSpark
