= Electricity Is on Our Side =

Studio album by Busdriver
- Released: June 8, 2018
- Genre: Hip-hop
- Length: 82:17
- Label: Temporary Whatever

Busdriver chronology
Thumbs (2015)	Electricity Is on Our Side (2018)

Electricity Is on Our Side is a studio album by American rapper Busdriver. It was released on June 8, 2018 by Temporary Whatever. It features guest appearances from Hemlock Ernst, Daedelus, and Denmark Vessey, among others. A music video for "Right Before the Miracle" was released on June 1, 2018.

== Critical reception ==
Professional ratings
Review scores
Source	Rating
Bandcamp Daily	favorable
BeatRoute	favorable
Los Angeles Times	favorable

Tory Rosso of BeatRoute gave the album a favorable review, writing: "Consisting of 23 tracks for an astounding 82 minutes, the record is an eclectic backdrop of resonance and jingle." Will Schube of Bandcamp Daily described it as "an album that's both the best encapsulation of Busdriver's mission and ethos, and a radical rearranging of rap's boundaries."

== Track listing ==
No.	Title	Length
1.	"Electricity Is on Our Side"	4:54
2.	"I'm from a Different Time"	3:07
3.	"Grape Drank" (featuring Denmark Vessey)	3:25
4.	"The Saboteur's Mirror"	4:37
5.	"Losing You Again"	4:04
6.	"The Year I Became a Mutherfuckin' G" (featuring Dntel and Lorde Fredd33)	6:11
7.	"Anything Can Happen///Goodlife Skit"	0:31
8.	"Me vs. Me" (featuring Swarvy)	3:08
9.	"Kiss Around the Note"	4:16
10.	"Break"	0:12
11.	"I Been There" (featuring Kenny Segal and Mike Parvizi)	3:11
12.	"Right Before the Miracle" (featuring The Underground Railroad)	5:16
13.	"This Is My Art and It Is Dangerous"	0:56
14.	"To Top the Divorcees List of Baroness Nica"	2:57
15.	"Several Friends"	2:50
16.	"Tiny Infinities" (featuring Hemlock Ernst)	4:58
17.	"Improviser's Anthem" (featuring Fumitake Tamura)	5:01
18.	"Be-Grizzled_Amateur_Mythos Take_3"	1:27
19.	"Jeane Anthony" (featuring Fumitake Tamura)	4:24
20.	"Exploding Slowly" (featuring Daedelus)	4:41
21.	"Fukn" (featuring Swarvy)	3:34
22.	"Sore Spot"	2:42
23.	"Pull the Sky Closer"	5:52
Total length:		82:17
