= Raw Money Raps =

Studio album by Jeremiah Jae
- Released: July 24, 2012
- Genre: Hip-hop
- Length: 48:59
- Label: Brainfeeder
- Producer: Jeremiah Jae; Flying Lotus

Jeremiah Jae chronology
| Raw Money Raps (2012) | Rawhyde (2013) |

Singles from Raw Money Raps
- 1. "Money" Released: 2012

Raw Money Raps is the debut studio album by American hip-hop musician Jeremiah Jae. It was released through Brainfeeder on July 24, 2012.

== Critical reception ==
Professional ratings
Aggregate scores
| Source | Rating |
|---|---|
| Metacritic | 79/100 |
Review scores
| Source | Rating |
| Beats Per Minute | 80% |
| Clash | 8/10 |
| Fact | 2.5/5 stars |
| Pitchfork | 6.8/10 |
| Potholes in My Blog | 4/5 stars |
| The Skinny | 4/5 stars |
| XLR8R | 6.5/10 |

At Metacritic, which assigns a weighted average score out of 100 to reviews from mainstream critics, the album received an average score of 79, based on 8 reviews, indicating "generally favorable reviews".

Marcus J. Moore of Beats Per Minute commented that "The album dissolves as it progresses, transitioning from upbeat fare to a visceral dream sequence of disoriented meditation set atop a versatile soundtrack." Eric Thorp of Clash described the album as "an exciting audible adventure into progressive hip-hop." Bram E. Gieben of The Skinny wrote, "A slow burner, Raw Money Raps is soulful, difficult, heartfelt and utterly modern."

Rhapsody placed it at number 12 on the "Top 20 Hip-Hop Albums of 2012" list. Potholes in My Blog placed it at number 32 on the "50 Best Albums of 2012” list.

== Track listing ==
All tracks are written by Jeremiah Jae.

| No. | Title | Producer(s) | Length |
|---|---|---|---|
| 1. | "Man (Revolution Pt. 1)" | Jeremiah Jae | 1:03 |
| 2. | "Guns Go Off" | Jeremiah Jae | 2:53 |
| 3. | "Greetings" (featuring Tre) | Jeremiah Jae | 2:48 |
| 4. | "Rover" | Jeremiah Jae | 1:05 |
| 5. | "Leaders" | Jeremiah Jae | 2:25 |
| 6. | "Ignorant Mask" (featuring K Embry) | Jeremiah Jae | 3:15 |
| 7. | "Cat Fight" | Flying Lotus | 2:25 |
| 8. | "Tourist" | Jeremiah Jae | 3:10 |
| 9. | "Money and Food" | Jeremiah Jae | 3:34 |
| 10. | "Wires" | Jeremiah Jae | 2:22 |
| 11. | "Seasons" | Jeremiah Jae | 3:03 |
| 12. | "False Eyes" | Jeremiah Jae | 3:21 |
| 13. | "One Herb" | Jeremiah Jae | 1:52 |
| 14. | "The Great Escape" | Jeremiah Jae | 1:43 |
| 15. | "Raw Money (Passage)" | Jeremiah Jae | 1:21 |
| 16. | "Money" | Jeremiah Jae | 2:06 |
| 17. | "Guerilla (Evolution Pt. 1)" | Jeremiah Jae | 4:47 |
| 18. | "Hercules Versus the Commune" | Jeremiah Jae | 3:00 |
| 19. | "Cable" | Jeremiah Jae | 2:39 |
| Total length: | | | 48:59 |

== Personnel ==
Credits adapted from liner notes.

- Jeremiah Jae – vocals, production (1–6, 8–19)
- Tre – vocals (3)
- K Embry – vocals (6)
- Flying Lotus – production (7)
- B+ – photography
