= Thumbs (mixtape) =

Mixtape by Busdriver
- Released: November 6, 2015
- Genre: Hip-hop
- Length: 51:18
- Label: Temporary Whatever
- Producers: Busdriver; Fumitake Tamura; Greyhat; Mono/Poly; Kenny Segal; Mike Parvizi; Mr. Carmack; JNTH STN; Lebeatski; Jeremiah Jae; Caural

Busdriver chronology
| Perfect Hair (2014) | Thumbs (2015) | Electricity Is on Our Side (2018) |

Thumbs is a mixtape by American rapper Busdriver. It was released by Temporary Whatever on November 6, 2015. A music video was created for "Much".

== Production ==
Thumbs is produced by the likes of Mono/Poly, Fumitake Tamura, Kenny Segal, Caural, and Jeremiah Jae. It includes guest appearances from Hemlock Ernst, Milo, and Anderson .Paak, among others.

== Critical reception ==
Professional ratings
Review scores
| Source | Rating |
|---|---|
| Exclaim! | 8/10 |

Kyle Mullin of Exclaim! commented that Thumbs has "many enthralling surprises, all of which will allow indie rap fans to rest easy knowing that Busdriver has by no means exhausted his waking nightmare, subconsciously subversive shtick." Blake Gillespie of Impose included it on the "Best Rap Mixtapes, EPs, and Free Albums of 2015" list.

== Track listing ==
| No. | Title | Producer(s) | Length |
|---|---|---|---|
| 1. | "Absolutions in the Hottentot Supercluster" (featuring Zeroh and Kaveh Rastegar) | Fumitake Tamura | 4:33 |
| 2. | "Black Labor (as Understood by Equiano)" | Greyhat | 3:15 |
| 3. | "Hyperbolic 2" | Mono/Poly | 3:09 |
| 4. | "Much" | Kenny Segal; Mike Parvizi; Mr. Carmack | 3:38 |
| 5. | "Ministry of the Torture Couch" (featuring Hemlock Ernst) | Elos | 5:18 |
| 6. | "Worlds to Run" (featuring Milo and Anderson .Paak) | Kenny Segal | 5:15 |
| 7. | "Skit" | Busdriver | 0:26 |
| 8. | "Surrounded by Millionaires" (featuring Daveed Diggs) | JNTH STN | 2:34 |
| 9. | "Great Spooks of Enormous Strength" | Lebeatski | 3:27 |
| 10. | "Del's Couch" (featuring Del the Funky Homosapien) | Busdriver | 1:50 |
| 11. | "Shadows and Victories" (featuring Jeremiah Jae) | Jeremiah Jae | 3:51 |
| 12. | "NY 03 Live" (featuring Caural) | Caural | 1:15 |
| 13. | "Species of Property" | Lebeatski | 3:26 |
| 14. | "Two Feet in the Layered Cake" (bonus track; featuring Kool A.D.) | Busdriver | 5:33 |
| 15. | "Answering Machinist" (bonus track; featuring Jeremiah Jae) | Jeremiah Jae | 3:48 |
| Total length: | | | 51:18 |
