= Perfect Hair (album) =

Studio album by Busdriver
- Released: September 9, 2014
- Genre: Hip-hop
- Length: 46:55
- Label: Big Dada
- Producers: Busdriver; Candy Claw; Greyhat; Great Dane; Ikey Owens; Jeremiah Jae; Kenny Segal; Mike Gao; Mono/Poly; Riley Lake

Busdriver chronology
Beaus$Eros (2012)	Perfect Hair (2014)	Thumbs (2015)

Perfect Hair is the eighth studio album by American rapper Busdriver. It was released on September 9, 2014, by Big Dada. The album features guest appearances from Aesop Rock, Danny Brown and Open Mike Eagle, among others. The cover art was painted by John Lurie. Music videos were made for "Ego Death", "Colonize the Moon", "Eat Rich" and "Motion Lines".

On June 20, 2014, "Ego Death" was chosen by Consequence of Sound as one of their Top 10 Songs of the Week.

== Critical reception ==
Professional ratings
Aggregate scores
Source	Rating
AnyDecentMusic?	7.1/10
Metacritic	74/100
Review scores
Source	Rating
AllMusic	4/5 stars
Clash	7/10
Consequence of Sound	B−
Exclaim!	7/10
MusicOMH	4/5 stars
PopMatters	7/10
Tiny Mix Tapes	3/5 stars

Perfect Hair received generally positive reviews from critics. At Metacritic, which assigns a normalized rating out of 100 to reviews from mainstream publications, the album received an average score of 74, based on 10 reviews.

Adam Kivel of Consequence of Sound said: "Wild, insanely ambitious, and a bit inconsistent, Perfect Hair encodes and decodes the ideas, opinions, and deconstructions that can only come from Farquhar's brain." David Jeffries of AllMusic said, "Perfect Hair contains all the usual reasons Busdriver is wonderful, just with a little more sugar baked in." Grant Brydon of Clash said, "The rollercoaster ride of his delivery makes it an enjoyable experience rather than a textbook headache." Matt Bauer of Exclaim! said, "A few duds abound, like the wearisome "Eat Rich", but the album ends strongly with the sci-fi-flavoured "Colonize the Moon". Jack Dutton of musicOMH said, "Although this album is at times a difficult listen, you can't help but admire Busdriver for his innovation and general wackiness." Nathan Stevens of PopMatters said, "Perfect Hair is no doubt a great album, but its tendency to fidget between ideas leaves it the idea of cohesion in a shallow grave."

== Track listing ==
No.	Title	Producer(s)	Length
1.	"Retirement Ode"	Busdriver	3:19
2.	"Bliss Point"	Busdriver	3:35
3.	"Ego Death" (featuring Aesop Rock and Danny Brown)	Jeremiah Jae	6:00
4.	"Upsweep"	Mono/Poly	4:28
5.	"When the Tooth-lined Horizon Blinks" (featuring Open Mike Eagle)	Great Dane	4:09
6.	"Motion Lines"	Busdriver	5:12
7.	"Eat Rich"	Kenny Segal	3:08
8.	"King Cookie Faced (for Her)"	Busdriver	4:05
9.	"Can't You Tell I'm a Sociopath" (featuring VerBS)	Mike Gao	3:10
10.	"Colonize the Moon" (featuring Pegasus Warning)	Riley Lake; Busdriver	9:49

Perfect Hair bonus tracks
No.	Title	Producer(s)	Length
11.	"Joyce 1"	Riley Lake	4:17
12.	"How Your Sprinkler System Work" (featuring Del the Funky Homosapien)	Busdriver; Candy Claw	2:56
13.	"Go Hard or Go Homogenous" (featuring P.O.S)	Kenny Segal	3:36

Vinyl and Japanese edition bonus track
No.	Title	Producer(s)	Length
14.	"Octagon"	Busdriver; Ikey Owens	4:22

Bandcamp bonus track
No.	Title	Producer(s)	Length
15.	"King Cookie Faced (for Hellfyre)" (featuring Open Mike Eagle and Milo)	Greyhat	6:08

Notes

- "Retirement Ode" features uncredited vocals by Terra Lopez
- "Bliss Point" features uncredited saxophone by Ben Wendel
- "Colonize the Moon" includes a bonus track at 5:13, called "Bone Structure" featuring Open Mike Eagle
- "Joyce 1" features uncredited vocals by Joelle Le and Riley Lake
- "King Cookie Faced (for Hellfyre)" features uncredited vocals by Terra Lopez and Joelle Le
