= CTRL (gene) =

Protein-coding gene in the species Homo sapiens

Identifiers
- Aliases: CTRL, CTRL1, chymotrypsin like
- External IDs: OMIM: 118888; MGI: 88558; GeneCards: CTRL

Gene location (Human)
Chr.	Chromosome 16 (human)
Band	16q22.1	Start	67,927,640 bp
Band	16q22.1	End	67,932,365 bp

Gene location (Mouse)
Chr.	Chromosome 8 (mouse)
Band	8 D3|8 53.06 cM	Start	106,658,635 bp
Band	8 D3|8 53.06 cM	End	106,660,494 bp
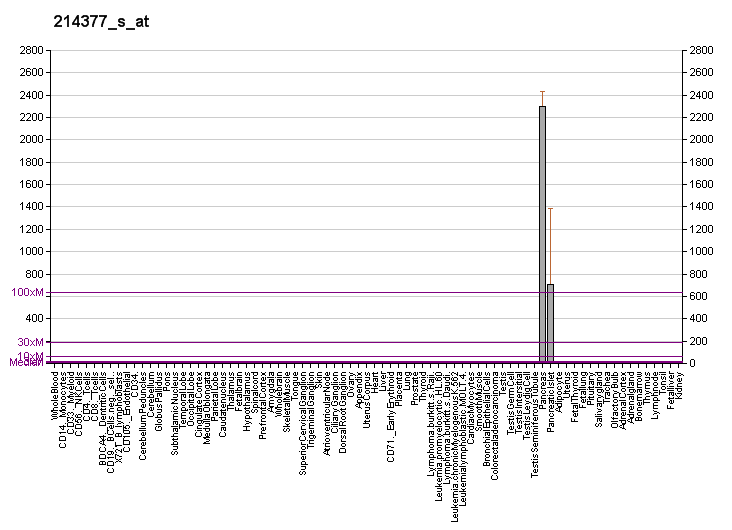
RNA expression pattern
Bgee	Human / Mouse (ortholog); Top expressed in: body of pancreas; islet of Langerhans; testicle; gonad; granulocyte; blood; monocyte; bone marrow; spleen; right hemisphere of cerebellum / Top expressed in: pyloric antrum; islet of Langerhans; duodenum; morula; choroid plexus of fourth ventricle; embryo; embryo; mesenteric lymph nodes; Paneth cell; spleen; More reference expression data
BioGPS	More reference expression data
Gene ontology
Molecular function	peptidase activity; serine-type endopeptidase activity; hydrolase activity; serine-type peptidase activity
Cellular component	extracellular space
Biological process	proteolysis; protein catabolic process
Sources:Amigo / QuickGO
Orthologs
Databases	NCBI: entry; OMA: entry
Species	Human	Mouse
Entrez	1506	109660
Ensembl	ENSG00000141086	ENSMUSG00000031896
UniProt	P40313	Q9ER05
RefSeq (mRNA)	NM_001907	NM_023182
RefSeq (protein)	NP_001898	NP_075671
Location (UCSC)	Chr 16: 67.93 – 67.93 Mb	Chr 8: 106.66 – 106.66 Mb
PubMed search
- Wikidata
View/Edit Human	View/Edit Mouse

Chymotrypsin-like protease CTRL-1 is an enzyme that in humans is encoded by the CTRL gene.
