= CNTRL: Beyond EDM =

North American educational initiative

CNTRL: Beyond EDM was an educational initiative, centred on electronic dance music (EDM), and comprising music production seminars, lessons in the music business and live music performances on a tour of North American universities.

== Overview ==
Organised by a core team of Richie Hawtin, Loco Dice and Ean Golden, the tour included many high-profile guest speakers and performers. Their stated aim was "engaging young North American fans of EDM and showing them the roots of the music, the history of a global movement and demonstrating what the future of music technology and performance has the power to become." Partners included Sennheiser, New York DJ school Dubspot and DJTechtools magazine. The CNTRL branding featured a fingerprint/circuitboard logo representing the expression of musicians' individuality through electronics.

== Events ==
The first series of events took place in October and November 2012, touring the east coast of the United States and Canada. Seminars were held in:

- University at Buffalo, Buffalo, New York
- Syracuse University, Syracuse, New York
- Berklee College of Music, Boston, Massachusetts
- American University, Washington, District of Columbia
- Drexel University, Philadelphia, Pennsylvania
- Tisch School of the Arts, New York, New York
- McGill University, Montreal, Quebec
- University of Western Ontario, London, Ontario
- University of Windsor, Windsor, Ontario
- Ryerson University, Toronto, Ontario
- Wayne State University, Detroit, Michigan
- University of Illinois, Urbana, Illinois
- University of Michigan, Ann Arbor, Michigan
- University of Dayton, Dayton, Ohio
- Columbia College Chicago, Chicago, Illinois
- Madison Media Institute, Madison, Wisconsin
- Slam Academy, Minneapolis, Minnesota

Each was followed by an evening performance at a nearby venue. A further event took place in March 2013 at the SXSW music festival in Austin, Texas.
