= Jhelli Beam =

Studio album by Busdriver
- Released: June 9, 2009
- Genre: Hip-hop
- Length: 50:41
- Label: Anti-
- Producers: Nosaj Thing; Omid; Nobody; Busdriver; Daedelus; Free the Robots; Greg Saunier

Busdriver chronology
RoadKillOvercoat (2007)	Jhelli Beam (2009)	Beaus$Eros (2012)

Singles from Jhelli Beam
- 1. "Me-Time (With the Pulmonary Palimpsest)" Released: 2009

Jhelli Beam is the sixth studio album by American rapper Busdriver. It was released on Anti- in 2009.

== Critical reception ==
Professional ratings
Aggregate scores
Source	Rating
Metacritic	74/100
Review scores
Source	Rating
AllMusic	3/5 stars
Robert Christgau	(1-star Honorable Mention)
HipHopDX	3.0/5
NME	3.5/5 stars
The Phoenix	3.5/4 stars
Pitchfork	6.2/10
PopMatters	8/10 stars
Spin	3.5/5 stars
URB	4/5 stars
XLR8R	7/10

At Metacritic, which assigns a weighted average score out of 100 to reviews from mainstream critics, the album received an average score of 74, based on 12 reviews, indicating "generally favorable reviews".

Alan Ranta of PopMatters gave the album 8 stars out of 10, saying: "It is too intelligent and challenging to the status quo for the mainstream media to truly embrace, and Anti- seems to be lacking a little on the side of their hip-hop promotion department." Mosi Reeves of Spin gave the album 3.5 stars out of 5, writing: "Extraordinarily irrational and willfully convoluted, Jhelli Beam is avant-rap as quantum physics."

The opening track, "Split Seconds (Between Nannies and Swamis)", was described by Thomas Quinlan of URB as "Busdriver's simplest, most accessible rap jam, eschewing the bursts of rapid rap flows that usually accompany his slower style, and only occasionally bringing in a bit of sing-song." He gave the album 4 stars out of 5, stating: "While there's some experimentation with new ideas here, Jhelli Beam is familiar enough to leave Busdriver fans more than satisfied."

== Track listing ==
No.	Title	Producer(s)	Length
1.	"Split Seconds (Between Nannies and Swamis)"	Nosaj Thing	4:16
2.	"Me-Time (With the Pulmonary Palimpsest)"	Omid	2:36
3.	"Handfuls of Sky"	Nobody; Busdriver	5:08
4.	"Scoliosis Jones"	Daedelus	2:36
5.	"Least Favorite Rapper" (featuring Nocando)	Free the Robots	3:23
6.	"Quebec and Back"	Nobody	4:07
7.	"Do the Wop"	Daedelus	3:02
8.	"World Agape"	Greg Saunier	2:16
9.	"Manchuria" (featuring Myka 9)	Nobody	3:48
10.	"Unsafe Sextet/Gilded Hearts of Booklovers"	Omid	5:11
11.	"Happy Insider" (featuring Nick Thorburn)	Daedelus; Busdriver	3:29
12.	"I've Always Known"	Busdriver	2:37
13.	"Fishy Face" (featuring John Dieterich)	Daedelus	5:09
14.	"Sorry Fuckers" (bonus track)	Busdriver	3:03
Total length:			50:41

== Personnel ==
Credits adapted from liner notes.

- Busdriver – vocals, production (3, 11, 12, 14)
- Nosaj Thing – production (1)
- Omid – production (2, 10)
- Nobody – production (3, 6, 9)
- AntiMC – glockenspiel (3), electric guitar (4), bass guitar (8)
- Shawn Lee – string arrangement (3)
- Everton Nelson – violin (3)
- Warren Zielenski – violin (3)
- John Metcalfe – viola (3)
- Ian Burge – cello (3)
- Daedelus – production (4, 7, 11, 13)
- Nocando – vocals (5)
- Free the Robots – production (5)
- Greg Saunier – production (8)
- Myka 9 – vocals (9)
- Leticia – additional instrumentation (10)
- Create(!) – additional instrumentation (10)
- Nick Thorburn – vocals (11)
- John Dieterich – guitar (13), bass guitar (13), soundscape (13)
- Trevor Hernandez – artwork, design
- Bryan Sheffield – photography
