= Ctrl Alt Delete (album) =

Studio album by Free the Robots
- Released: March 30, 2010
- Genres: Instrumental hip hop, electronic
- Length: 65:48
- Label: Alpha Pup Records
- Producer: Free the Robots

Free the Robots chronology
Ctrl Alt Delete (2010)	The Balance (2013)

Professional ratings
Review scores
Source	Rating
Cyclic Defrost	favorable
The Mercury	3 stars
URB	favorable

Ctrl Alt Delete is the first studio album by American record producer Free the Robots. It was released on Alpha Pup Records on March 30, 2010. "The Eye" features a guest appearance from Ikey Owens. A music video was created for "Jupiter".

== Critical reception ==
Wayne Stronell of Cyclic Defrost said, "Ctrl Alt Delete is a blistering record of intense synthesizer wizardry, but along the way it has absorbed so much more than just another electronic album, the influences are varied, and the result would please many a fan in varying genres, from dubstep, grime, hip hop and wonky abstract beat science."

Ctrl Alt Delete was listed by Chris Ziegler of OC Weekly as "One of the Strongest Local Releases of the Year".

== Track listing ==
No.	Title	Length
1.	"Sci-Fidelity"	6:21
2.	"Turbulence"	3:54
3.	"Jupiter"	5:36
4.	"Orion's Belt Buckle"	3:59
5.	"Wandering Gypsy"	4:29
6.	"Select/Start"	3:44
7.	"Voices"	5:52
8.	"Granite Rock"	4:06
9.	"Mental Universe"	4:20
10.	"Global Warning"	9:08
11.	"The Eye" (featuring Ikey Owens)	6:47
12.	"Turkish Voodoo"	3:19
13.	"Inter Arm"	4:16
