= Beaus$Eros =

Studio album by Busdriver
- Released: February 21, 2012
- Genre: Hip-hop
- Length: 54:25
- Label: Fake Four Inc.
- Producers: Loden; Busdriver

Busdriver chronology
Jhelli Beam (2009)	Beaus$Eros (2012)	Perfect Hair (2014)

Beaus$Eros (pronounced "bows & arrows") is the seventh studio album by American rapper Busdriver. It was released on Fake Four Inc. in 2012.

== Critical reception ==
Professional ratings
Aggregate scores
Source	Rating
Metacritic	62/100
Review scores
Source	Rating
AllMusic	3/5 stars
CMJ	favorable
Consequence of Sound	C+
Dusted Magazine	mixed
Exclaim!	favorable
No Ripchord	7/10
PopMatters	6/10 stars
Spin	6/10

At Metacritic, which assigns a weighted average score out of 100 to reviews from mainstream critics, the album received an average score of 62, based on 11 reviews, indicating "generally favorable reviews".

Thomas Quinlan of Exclaim! gave the album a favorable review, noting that "Belgian producer Loden mixes hip-hop, electronica, drum & bass, glitch-hop, synth rock, '80s pop and anything else he can get his hands on, often moving from one style to another within a single track." Brice Ezell of PopMatters gave the album 6 stars out of 10, saying: "While part of the beauty of Busdriver's work is the challenge it presents, much of Beaus$Eros isn't really challenging but instead confused."

== Track listing ==
No.	Title	Length
1.	"Utilitarian Uses of Love"	4:09
2.	"Bon Bon Fire"	4:08
3.	"Kiss Me Back to Life"	3:19
4.	"You Ain't OG"	4:25
5.	"NoBlacksNoJewsNoAsians"	2:00
6.	"Picking Band Names"	4:06
7.	"Beaus$Eros"	3:45
8.	"Feelings"	3:49
9.	"Ass to Mouth"	3:28
10.	"Electric Blue" (featuring Sierra Cassidy, Mike Ladd, and Joëlle Lê)	4:31
11.	"Here's to Us"	4:57
12.	"Colour Wheel"	3:45
13.	"Swandive into a Drinking Glass"	5:06
14.	"Scattered Ashes"	3:02
Total length:		54:25

Deluxe edition bonus tracks
No.	Title	Length
15.	"Superhand's Mantra (F**k Us All)" (featuring Aesop Rock)	3:18
16.	"Utilitarian Uses of Love (Zavala Remix)"	3:12
17.	"Scattered Ashes (Sonnymoon Remix)"	3:19
18.	"Kiss Me Back to Life (Dntel Remix)"	4:02
19.	"Utilitarian Uses of Love (Child Actor Remix)"	4:30
Total length:		72:20

== Personnel ==
Credits adapted from liner notes.

- Busdriver – vocals, production (2, 6)
- Loden – production, mixing
- Annabel Feeney – vocals (2)
- Miguel Atwood-Ferguson – strings (4)
- François Legrain – trumpet (8)
- Sierra Cassidy – vocals (10)
- Mike Ladd – vocals (10)
- Joëlle Lê – vocals (10), inside panel photography
- Giovanni Oduber – guitar (11)
- Rory McCartney – image
- Michael Crigler – design
