= Centre national de ressources textuelles et lexicales =

French organization

The Centre national de ressources textuelles et lexicales (CNRTL) (English: National Center of Textual and Lexical Resources) is a French organisation which publishes linguistic data and information online.

== History and description ==
The CNRTL was created by the management of the department Homme et Société and the management of the scientific information of the CNRS, based on the UMR of the Analyse et traitement informatique de la langue française (ATILF) of the Nancy 2 University, which developed the Trésor de la langue française informatisé (TLFi). This project is incorporated into the European project CLARIN.

The database is expanded with the help of voluntary sources who wish to make viable and release linguistic content and who accept the charter produced by the CNRTL. If necessary, the CNRTL can contribute to the formatting of the information available online. The contributions are eventually validated by the proofreading committee of the CNRTL and the sources, and then published. The goal is to disseminate the largest possible amount of resources, and for the resources to be as reliable as possible.

The version of the site as it was on 1 January 2008 is the second version. The site can receive more than 500 000 visitors per day.

The site has not been updated since 2012. A new updated website is launched in 2026 (see link below).
