= CNTRL =

Protein-coding gene in the species Homo sapiens

Identifiers
- Aliases: CNTRL, CEP1, CEP110, FAN, bA165P4.1, centriolin
- External IDs: OMIM: 605496; MGI: 1889576; HomoloGene: 38260; GeneCards: CNTRL; OMA:CNTRL - orthologs

Gene location (Human)
Chr.	Chromosome 9 (human)
Band	9q33.2	Start	121,074,660 bp
Band	9q33.2	End	121,177,729 bp

Gene location (Mouse)
Chr.	Chromosome 2 (mouse)
Band	2|2 B	Start	35,109,492 bp
Band	2|2 B	End	35,178,822 bp
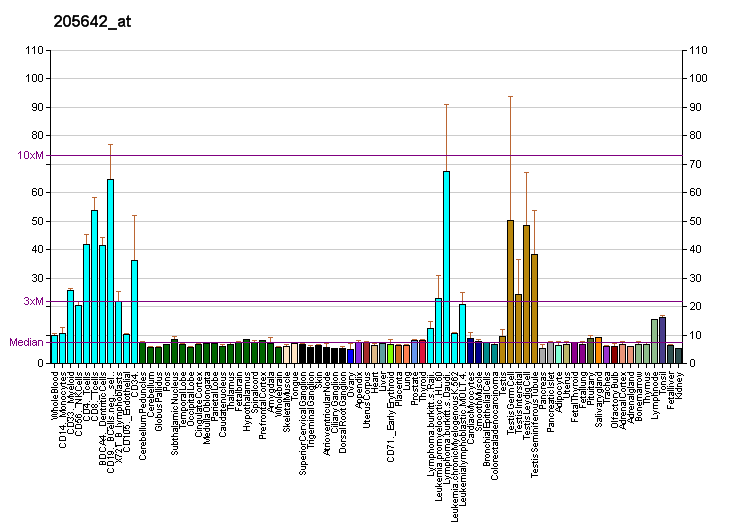
RNA expression pattern
Bgee	Human / Mouse (ortholog); Top expressed in: Achilles tendon; secondary oocyte; ventricular zone; bronchial epithelial cell; testicle; left testis; right testis; sural nerve; sperm; monocyte / Top expressed in: genital tubercle; ventricular zone; granulocyte; spermatocyte; tail of embryo; thymus; mesenteric lymph nodes; spermatid; spleen; blood; More reference expression data
BioGPS	More reference expression data
Gene ontology
Molecular function	protein binding; protein tyrosine kinase activity; cytoskeletal protein binding
Cellular component	microtubule organizing center; centrosome; cytoskeleton; membrane; cytoplasm; cytosol; midbody; Flemming body; centriolar subdistal appendage
Biological process	cell division; cell cycle; G2/M transition of mitotic cell cycle; peptidyl-tyrosine phosphorylation; mitotic cell cycle; ciliary basal body-plasma membrane docking; regulation of G2/M transition of mitotic cell cycle; regulation of cytoskeleton organization
Sources:Amigo / QuickGO
Orthologs
Species	Human	Mouse
Entrez	11064	26920
Ensembl	ENSG00000119397	ENSMUSG00000057110
UniProt	Q7Z7A1	A2AL36
RefSeq (mRNA)	NM_007018; NM_001330762; NM_001369892; NM_001369893; NM_001369894 NM_001369895; NM_001369896	NM_001290635; NM_012018; NM_030000; NM_001379274; NM_001379275
RefSeq (protein)	NP_001317691; NP_008949; NP_001356821; NP_001356822; NP_001356823 NP_001356824; NP_001356825	NP_001277564; NP_036148; NP_001366203; NP_001366204
Location (UCSC)	Chr 9: 121.07 – 121.18 Mb	Chr 2: 35.11 – 35.18 Mb
PubMed search
- Wikidata
View/Edit Human	View/Edit Mouse

Centriolin is a protein that in humans is encoded by the CNTRL gene. It was previously known as CEP110.

This gene encodes a centrosomal protein required for the centrosome to function as a microtubule organizing center. The gene product is also associated with centrosome maturation. One version of stem cell myeloproliferative disorder is the result of a reciprocal translocation between chromosomes 8 and 9, with the breakpoint associated with fibroblast growth factor receptor 1 and centriolin.
