= Madison Media Institute =

Former for-profit media arts college in Madison, Wisconsin

Coordinates: 43°03′32.4″N 89°17′38.9″W

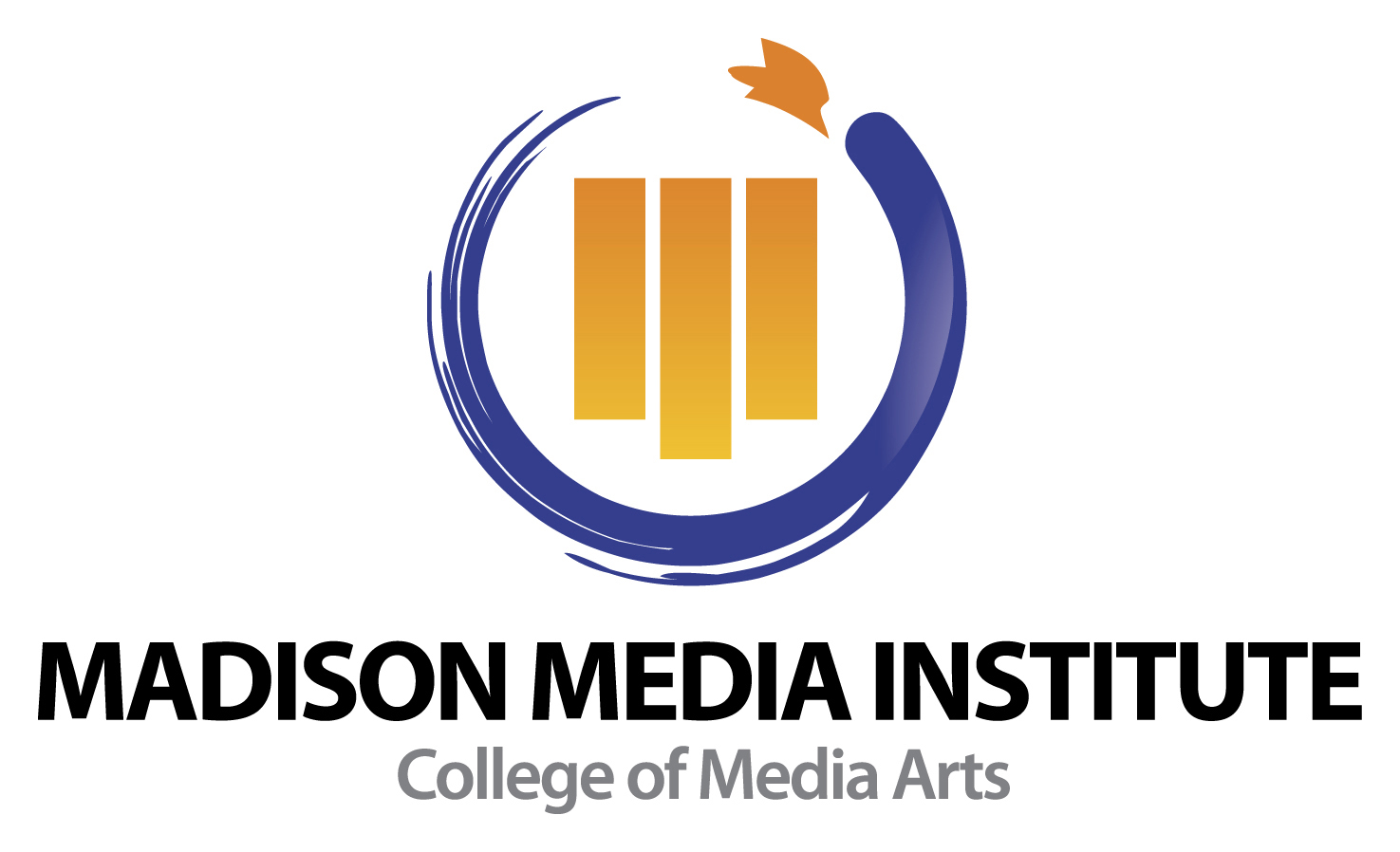
- Type: Private, for-profit college
- Active: 1969–2018
- President: Mike Bailey
- Faculty: 50
- Administrative staff: 24
- Students: 480
- Location: Madison, Wisconsin, USA
- Campus: Urban
- Website: mediainstitute.edu

Madison Media Institute (MMI) was a private for-profit media arts college in Madison, Wisconsin. Until 2017, it ran a branch location in Edina, Minnesota. The school offered associate and baccalaureate degree programs in video, music production, game design, media technology, graphic design, and web and entertainment business.

MMI closed in 2018. Notable alumni include the YouTuber Dylan Is In Trouble, who frequently references the college and its closure, often referring to it as a "scam."

== History ==
Madison Media Institute was established in 1969 by Ray Szmanda (more well-known regionally as "The Menards Guy" for his longtime ads for that chain) as Trans-American School of Broadcasting, with programs that prepared graduates for jobs in radio broadcasting. Over the years the college added a broader range of programs to reflect the changes in the media field, such as video & motion graphics, electronic & A/V systems, graphic and web design, entertainment & media business, and independent digital film.

In 1986 Szmanda sold the college to Ed Hutchings, a career broadcaster who owned the school from 1986 to 2007. In August 2007 the Hutchings family sold the college to American Higher Education Development Corporation, a New York company.

In August 2018, Madison Media Institute announced that it would close. MMI president and academic dean Mike Bailey cited "business reasons" for the decision.

== Programs of study ==
The school specialized in programs in audio production, music production, sound for video, sound for games, sound for films, graphic arts, web design, animation, game design, video production, camera techniques, photography, AV systems design and installation, visual fx, music production software, music business and media business skills. In addition, students can specialize in the business of entertainment, music, video, film, and media.

Tuition ranged from $32,000 to $46,000 for a two-year degree, depending on the program and the campus.

== Minneapolis Media Institute ==
In 2009 the Media College added a branch campus in Edina, Minnesota in the Flyte Tyme recording studios previously owned by Jimmy Jam and Terry Lewis. Starting as a music production school, Minneapolis Media Institute later offered programs in animation, graphic design, mobile app development, and business.

The Minneapolis campus offered four Associate Degree programs: Audio & Recording Arts, Animation & Game Design, Graphic & Web Design, and User Interface/User Experience (UI/UX). It also offered an online degree program, Digital Marketing & Media, where students learned online marketing initiatives and campaign management. Minneapolis Media Institute also offered an online Mobile Application Development Certification program and a Business in Media Bachelor of Science Degree program.

Minneapolis Media Institute closed in 2017.
