= The Best of Red Hot Chili Peppers =

Greatest hits album by Red Hot Chili Peppers
- Released: 1994
- Recorded: 1984–1989
- Genre: Funk rock
- Label: Capitol
- Producer: Various

Red Hot Chili Peppers chronology
Out in L.A. (1994)	The Best of Red Hot Chili Peppers (1994)	One Hot Minute (1995)

Professional ratings
Review scores
Source	Rating
AllMusic	2.5/5 stars

The Best of Red Hot Chili Peppers (also titled Greatest Hits on some versions) is a compilation album by the Red Hot Chili Peppers, first released in 1994, containing tracks from the band's time signed to the EMI America record label. What Hits!? has all these songs and 8 more. This compilation has been reprinted at least 4 times from 1994 to 2005 with different cover art.

== Track listing ==
No.	Title	Length
1.	"Behind the Sun"	4:40
2.	"Johnny, Kick a Hole in the Sky"	5:12
3.	"Me and My Friends"	3:09
4.	"Fire"	2:03
5.	"True Men Don't Kill Coyotes"	3:38
6.	"Higher Ground"	3:23
7.	"Knock Me Down"	3:45
8.	"Fight Like a Brave"	3:53
9.	"Taste the Pain"	4:32
10.	"If You Want Me to Stay"	4:05
