= Mother's Milk Tour =

1989–90 concert tour by Red Hot Chili Peppers

- Tour by Red Hot Chili Peppers
- Promotional poster for two 1990 shows
- Associated album: Mother's Milk
- Start date: January 22, 1989
- End date: December 31, 1990
- Legs: 8

Red Hot Chili Peppers concert chronology
- Turd Town Tour (1988); Mother's Milk Tour (1989–1990); Blood Sugar Sex Magik Tour (1991–1993)

The Mother's Milk Tour (also known as the Suckle Up to the Breast of Mother Earth Tour, Positive Mental Octopus Tour, The Lazy Cowgirls Tour and The Great Expectorations Tour) was a worldwide concert tour by Red Hot Chili Peppers to support their fourth studio album Mother's Milk, the breakthrough album for the band which launched them to bigger success than ever before. It was the first full tour with guitarist John Frusciante and drummer Chad Smith, who joined late in the previous year.

== Background ==
Following the 1988 death of Hillel Slovak, departure of Jack Irons and firing of DeWayne McKnight and D.H. Peligro, Anthony Kiedis and Flea were finally able to find a lineup in late 1988 that worked for them and that would go on to create some of the band's biggest and best known albums over the next twenty years. With John Frusciante and Chad Smith on board, Mother's Milk instantly garnered more attention than the band's previous records and, as such, the venues the band performed in were able to accommodate far larger crowds. The band was now playing more arenas than ever before. They were also gaining more television and radio exposure, especially through college radio, which was a huge supporter of the album and helped the band to eventually gain more mainstream attention. For the first time the band also upgraded to a full-fledged tour bus and added backup musicians and singers.

A VHS video documenting the tour titled Psychedelic Sexfunk Live from Heaven was released in 1990.

== Songs performed ==
Originals

The Red Hot Chili Peppers

- "Baby Appeal"
- "Get Up and Jump"
- "Green Heaven"
- "Mommy Where's Daddy?"
- "Out in L.A."
- "Police Helicopter"
- "True Men Don't Kill Coyotes"

Freaky Styley

- "American Ghost Dance"
- "Blackeyed Blonde"
- "Freaky Styley"
- "Jungle Man"
- "Hollywood (Africa) (The Meters)
- "Nevermind"
- "Yertle the Turtle"

The Uplift Mofo Party Plan

- "Backwoods"
- "Fight Like a Brave"
- "Funky Crime"
- "Love Trilogy"
- "Me and My Friends
- "Organic Anti-Beat Box Band"
- "Party on Your Pussy"
- "Skinny Sweaty Man"
- "Subterranean Homesick Blues" (Bob Dylan)

The Abbey Road E.P.

- "Fire" (Jimi Hendrix)

Mother's Milk

- "Higher Ground" (Stevie Wonder)
- "Good Time Boys"
- "Knock Me Down"
- "Magic Johnson"
- "Nobody Weird Like Me"
- "Pretty Little Ditty"
- "Punk Rock Classic"
- "Sexy Mexican Maid"
- "Stone Cold Bush"
- "Subway to Venus"
- "Taste the Pain"

Blood Sugar Sex Magik

- "The Greeting Song" (intro only)
- "Naked in the Rain"
- "Sir Psycho Sexy" (intro only)

Other (non-album songs)

- "Show Me Your Soul" (lip-synched performance)

Cover songs (used as intros or during jams unless otherwise noted)
- Anarchy in the U.K. (Sex Pistols)
- Back in Black (AC/DC)
- Batman T.V. Theme song
- Boyz-n-the-Hood (Eazy-E)
- Bulletproof (George Clinton)
- Castles Made of Sand (Jimi Hendrix)
- Cosmic Slop (Parliament Funkadelic)
- Crosstown Traffic (Jimi Hendrix)
- Don't Call Me Nigger, Whitey (Sly and the Family Stone)
- Dr. Funkenstein (Parliament Funkadelic)
- F.U. (Bemsha Swing (Thelonious Monk)
- Foxy Lady (Jimi Hendrix)
- God God (James Brown)
- Heaven on Their Minds (Jesus Christ Superstar)
- How Many More Times (Led Zeppelin)
- If You Got Funk, You Got Style (Parliament Funkadelic)
- Inca Roads (Frank Zappa)
- My Michelle (Guns N' Roses)
- Nervous Breakdown (Black Flag)
- No Head, No Backstage Pass (Parliament Funkadelic)
- Red Hot Mama (Parliament Funkadelic)
- Standing on the Verge of Getting It On (Parliament Funkadelic)
- Tiny Dancer (Elton John)
- What Is Soul? (Parliament Funkadelic)
- Whole Lotta Love (Led Zeppelin)
- Why Do Fools Fall in Love (Frankie Lymon and the Teenagers)
- Your Song (Elton John)

== Tour overview ==
The tour was by far the biggest tour for the band at the time breaking them through to new audiences and larger venues to perform at. The tour also included television appearances on such shows as The Arsenio Hall Show where they even performed a tribute to the late night host called "Ode To Arsenio" which was used as an intro to their cover of Stevie Wonder's "Higher Ground". In Austin, Texas, during the opening set by Mary's Danish, all four Chili Pepper's ran onstage totally naked, and tackled Mary's Danish two female lead singers. Out of the thirteen songs on the album, only "Johnny, Kick a Hole in the Sky" has never been performed live however it was oddly placed on the band's 1992 What Hits!? album. "Show Me Your Soul", recorded in 1990 which would end up on the 1990 soundtrack for the film, Pretty Woman got a one time only lip-synch performance although it has never been performed live. The band also performed "Naked in the Rain" for the first time ever near the tour's end. The song would appear on their next album, 1991's Blood Sugar Sex Magik. In July 2017 Chad Smith told in fan interview that actually many songs from the first three records were performed during the tour and some of them were played only one time. He also mentioned that the song "Jungle Man" was also played during this tour.

This tour marked the last time "American Ghost Dance", "Baby Appeal", "Good Time Boys", "Knock Me Down", "Punk Rock Classic", "Sexy Mexican Maid", "Jungle Man", "Taste the Pain" and "True Men Don't Kill Coyotes" were performed live.

== Opening acts ==
- The Black Crowes
- Buckpets
- Camper van Beethoven
- Cosmic Wurst
- The Cramps
- David St. Hubbins (introduced the band at June 16, 1990 show)
- The Dead Milkmen
- Exodus
- Faith No More
- Fishbone
- Mary's Danish
- Meat Puppets
- Murphy's Law
- Original Sins
- Pocket Fishermen
- Primus
- Raging Slab (December 1, 1989 Atlanta, GA, December 2, 1989, Charlotte, NC)
- The Reyond
- The Side Wingers
- Sprawl
- Suicidal Tendencies
- Too Free Stooges
- The Weirdos
- Young Fresh Fellows

== Personnel ==
- Flea - bass, backing vocals
- John Frusciante - guitar, backing vocals
- Anthony Kiedis - lead vocals
- Chad Smith - drums

== Additional musicians ==
- Keith "Tree" Barry - saxophone/horns, backing vocals
- Kristen Vigard - backing vocals
- Vickie Calhoun - backing vocals
- Robbie Allen - opening comedy act, roadie
