= What Hits!? =

1992 compilation album by Red Hot Chili Peppers

Greatest hits album by Red Hot Chili Peppers
- Released: September 29, 1992
- Recorded: 1984–1991
- Genre: Funk rock; alternative rock
- Length: 67:28
- Label: EMI
- Producer: Various

Red Hot Chili Peppers chronology
Blood Sugar Sex Magik (1991)	What Hits!? (1992)	Live Rare Remix Box (1994)

Singles from What Hits!?
- 1. "Behind the Sun" Released: November 9, 1992

Professional ratings
Review scores
Source	Rating
AllMusic	4.5/5 stars
Rolling Stone	3/5 stars
The Rolling Stone Album Guide	3/5 stars

What Hits!? is a greatest hits album by American rock band Red Hot Chili Peppers released on September 29, 1992, by EMI. The album contains tracks from the band's first four albums as well as "Under the Bridge" from their fifth album, 1991's hit Blood Sugar Sex Magik, and the Pretty Woman soundtrack contribution/single B-side "Show Me Your Soul". "Behind the Sun" was released as a single and music video to accompany the release of this compilation. The song originally appeared on the band's 1987 album The Uplift Mofo Party Plan. The compilation is the only full-length release of the band to feature "Show Me Your Soul".

== Background ==
This album was released on EMI/Capitol Records through a deal with Warner Bros. Records. The band had left EMI for Warner in 1991 where they would record their biggest album at the time, Blood Sugar Sex Magik. EMI, who owned the rights to the band's first four albums, decided to cash in on the band's newfound mainstream success. The two labels, however, agreed that each label would allow the usage to one song recorded during the Peppers career on each label so each company could produce a greatest hits compilation. EMI chose the band's biggest hit single at the time, "Under the Bridge," for What Hits!? and Warner Bros. chose "Higher Ground", the band's most successful single for EMI, for the band's 2003 compilation Greatest Hits.

The title of the compilation is a joke alluding to the relative lack of success achieved by the Red Hot Chili Peppers during their tenure with EMI, highlighting the irony that many of the tracks included on what is supposed to be a "greatest hits" compilation were generally singles that peaked notably low in the charts, arguably too low to be considered "hits" (and even in some cases, such as "The Brothers Cup," "Backwoods," and "Johnny, Kick a Hole in the Sky", were never released as singles at all with the latter song never even being performed live). Most of the material released on this album were songs taken from Freaky Styley, The Uplift Mofo Party Plan, and Mother's Milk. In 1987, the band attempted to release "Behind the Sun" as a single, but EMI didn't deem the song worthy enough to do so, although the label eventually did when the band became popular in the early 1990s.

In 2013, after EMI was absorbed by the Universal Music Group, What Hits!? saw a re-release as part of UMG's Icon compilation series.

== Track listing ==
What Hits!? track listing
No.	Title	Writer(s)	Original album	Length
1.	"Higher Ground"	Wonder	Mother's Milk (1989)	3:21
2.	"Fight Like a Brave"	Kiedis, Flea, Slovak, Irons	The Uplift Mofo Party Plan (1987)	3:47
3.	"Behind the Sun"	Kiedis, Flea, Slovak, Irons, Beinhorn	The Uplift Mofo Party Plan	4:45
4.	"Me & My Friends"	Kiedis, Flea, Slovak, Irons	The Uplift Mofo Party Plan	3:05
5.	"Backwoods"	Kiedis, Flea, Slovak, Irons	The Uplift Mofo Party Plan	3:06
6.	"True Men Don't Kill Coyotes"	Kiedis, Flea, Martinez, Sherman	The Red Hot Chili Peppers (1984)	3:36
7.	"Fire"	Hendrix	The Abbey Road E.P. (1988)	2:01
8.	"Get Up and Jump"	Kiedis, Flea, Slovak, Irons	The Red Hot Chili Peppers	2:50
9.	"Knock Me Down"	Kiedis, Flea, Frusciante, Smith	Mother's Milk	3:43
10.	"Under the Bridge"	Red Hot Chili Peppers	Blood Sugar Sex Magik (1991)	4:24
11.	"Show Me Your Soul"	Kiedis, Flea, Frusciante, Smith	Pretty Woman (1990)	4:22
12.	"If You Want Me to Stay"	Stone	Freaky Styley (1985)	4:06
13.	"Hollywood (Africa)"	Modeliste, Neville, Nocentelli, Porter	Freaky Styley	4:58
14.	"Jungle Man"	Kiedis, Flea, Martinez, Sherman	Freaky Styley	4:04
15.	"The Brothers Cup"	Kiedis, Flea, Slovak, Irons	Freaky Styley	3:24
16.	"Taste the Pain"	Kiedis, Flea, Frusciante, Peligro	Mother's Milk	4:34
17.	"Catholic School Girls Rule"	Kiedis, Flea, Martinez, Sherman	Freaky Styley	1:55
18.	"Johnny, Kick a Hole in the Sky"	Kiedis, Flea, Frusciante, Smith	Mother's Milk	5:10
Total length:				67:28

== Video ==
What Hits!?

Video by Red Hot Chili Peppers
- Released: September 29, 1992
- Recorded: 1984–1991
- Genre: Funk rock
- Length: 60 minutes
- Label: EMI

Red Hot Chili Peppers chronology
Funky Monks (1991)	What Hits!? (1992)	Off the Map (2001)

A VHS and later, DVD version of What Hits!? was also released. The video collection supersedes the 1990 video collection Positive Mental Octopus. A music video for the single "Behind the Sun" was created for this video collection and received airplay at the time on MTV. The video, which was made without the band's involvement, reuses footage from the band's "Higher Ground" music video along with newly added animation.

What Hits!? contains the following music videos:

1. "Behind the Sun"
2. "Under the Bridge"
3. "Show Me Your Soul"
4. "Taste the Pain"
5. "Higher Ground"
6. "Knock Me Down"
7. "Fight Like a Brave"
8. "Jungle Man"
9. "True Men Don't Kill Coyotes"
10. "Catholic School Girls Rule"
11. "Fire (live)"
12. "Stone Cold Bush" (live)
13. "Special Secret Song Inside" (live)
14. "Subway to Venus" (live)
- The last four live videos were taken from the band's 1990 Psychedelic Sexfunk Live from Heaven video.

== What Promo Hits!? ==
Prior to the album's release, EMI released a very rare five-song CD sampler titled What Promo Hits!?. The sampler was released to radio stations and not for public sale.

1. "Higher Ground"
2. "If You Want Me to Stay"
3. "Under the Bridge"
4. "Taste the Pain"
5. "Behind the Sun"

== Personnel ==
Red Hot Chili Peppers

- Anthony Kiedis – vocals
- Flea – bass guitar, trumpet
- Hillel Slovak – guitar (on tracks 2, 3, 4, 5, 7, 12, 13, 14, 15, 17)
- John Frusciante – guitar (on tracks 1, 9, 10, 11, 16, 18)
- Jack Sherman – guitar (on tracks 6, 8), backing vocals (on track 1)
- Jack Irons – drums (on tracks 2, 3, 4, 5, 7)
- Cliff Martinez – drums (on tracks 6, 8, 12, 13, 14, 15, 17)
- Chad Smith – drums (on tracks 1, 9, 10, 11, 18)

Additional musicians

- Philip "Fish" Fisher – drums (on track 16)
- Dave Coleman – cello (on track 16)

Production

- Michael Beinhorn – producer
- George Clinton – producer
- Norwood Fisher – producer
- Andy Gill – producer
- Rick Rubin – producer

== Charts ==
Chart performance for What Hits!?
Chart (1992)	Peak position
Australian Albums (ARIA)	9
Finnish Albums (Suomen virallinen lista)	4
Dutch Albums (Album Top 100)	80
New Zealand Albums (RMNZ)	5
Swedish Albums (Sverigetopplistan)	42
Swiss Albums (Schweizer Hitparade)	34
UK Albums (OCC)	23
US Billboard 200	22

== Certifications ==
Certifications for What Hits!?
Region	Certification	Certified units/sales
Australia (ARIA)	Platinum	70,000^{^}
Canada (Music Canada)	Platinum	100,000^{^}
New Zealand (RMNZ)	Platinum	15,000^{^}
United Kingdom (BPI)	Platinum	300,000^{‡}
United States (RIAA)	Platinum	1,000,000^{^}
^{^} Shipments figures based on certification alone.^{‡} Sales+streaming figures based on certification alone.
