= Behind the Sun (Red Hot Chili Peppers song) =

1992 single by Red Hot Chili Peppers

Song by Red Hot Chili Peppers

from the album The Uplift Mofo Party Plan
- Released: September 29, 1987
- Recorded: 1987
- Studio: Capitol (Hollywood)
- Genre: Funk metal; punk-funk
- Length: 4:41
- Label: EMI Manhattan
- Songwriters: Flea, Jack Irons, Anthony Kiedis, Hillel Slovak, Michael Beinhorn
- Producer: Michael Beinhorn

"Behind the Sun"

Single by Red Hot Chili Peppers

from the album What Hits!?
- Released: November 1992
- Genre: Funk metal; punk-funk
- Length: 4:41
- Label: EMI USA
- Songwriters: Flea, Jack Irons, Anthony Kiedis, Hillel Slovak, Michael Beinhorn
- Producer: Michael Beinhorn

Red Hot Chili Peppers singles chronology
"Breaking the Girl" (1992)	"Behind the Sun" (1992)	"If You Have to Ask" (1993)

Music video
- "Behind the Sun" on YouTube

"Behind the Sun" is a song by the Red Hot Chili Peppers from their 1987 album, The Uplift Mofo Party Plan. It was not released as a single until 1992 when it was used to promote the band's What Hits!? compilation album. The song charted at number 7 on the US Billboard Modern Rock Tracks chart and in New Zealand, as well as number 37 on the Australian ARIA Singles Chart.

== Background ==
The band had originally wanted to release the song as a single back in 1987, however the label refused to release it because they felt it was too melodic and didn't represent the band's sound. It would not be released as a single until 1992 to promote the What Hits!? compilation album, a hits package EMI released to cash in on the band's newfound major label mainstream success thanks to their album Blood Sugar Sex Magik and the hit ballad, "Under the Bridge".

The song is the only song from the Slovak era to have made it to the charts (although it was released after his death). Slovak's brother (James Slovak) named Hillel's biography Behind the Sun. During March 2012, The Weather Channel began using an instrumental demo version of the song as background music for its Local on the 8s segments.

== Music video ==
The music video was released on November 9, 1992, and received heavy rotation on MTV. The video features a mixture of animation and footage of the band from their 1989 "Higher Ground" music video. John Frusciante and Chad Smith appear in the video even though they didn't play on the song and were not with the band at the time it was recorded.

== Live performances ==
As of 2023 the song has never been performed live. In 1987, the band gave a lip-synched performance of "Behind the Sun" at the United Cerebral Palsy Telethon.

Flea explained in an interview that the band wasn't pleased with how the song sounded live. However, despite it never being performed live, it has been teased by the band quite a few times over the years in their live performances, with its intro being teased on the band's One Hot Minute tour during "Give It Away". On September 10, 2012, the song was once again teased while the band was performing in Tel Aviv for the first time. It was teased right before "Under the Bridge" was played.

== Track listing ==
Cassette single (1992)

1. "Behind the Sun" (album)
2. "Higher Ground" (Pearly 12-inch)

CD single (1992) (Also known as 'The Chili Digi' in Digipack)

1. "Behind the Sun" (album)
2. "Higher Ground" (Pearly 12-inch)
3. "If You Want Me to Stay" (Pink Mustang mix)
4. "Knock Me Down" (album)

== Charts ==
Chart (1992–1993)	Peak position
Australia (ARIA)	37
Canada Top Singles (RPM)	73
New Zealand (Recorded Music NZ)	7
US Bubbling Under Hot 100 (Billboard)	24
US Alternative Airplay (Billboard)	7
