= Baldwin Hills season 1 =

Baldwin Hills
- Season 1
- Season 1 cast
- No. of episodes: 10

Release
- Original network: BET
- Original release: July 10 – August 28, 2007

Season chronology
- Next → Season 2

The first season of Baldwin Hills premiered on July 10, 2007 and concluded on August 28, 2007.

== Cast ==
The following is a list of cast members for the 1st season.

- Main cast member
- Secondary cast member

Name	Notes
Gerren	(Season 1 +)
Moriah	(Season 1 +)
Staci	(Season 1 +)
Ashley	(Season 1 +)
Sal	(Season 1 +)
Roqui	(Season 1 only, Season 2 appearance)
Gaven	(Season 1 only)
Garnette	(Season 1 only)
Jordan	(Season 1 only)
Willie	(Season 1 only)
Daymeon	(Season 1 only)
Makensy	(Season 1 only)
Earl	(Season 1 only)
Tee'Nee	(Season 1 +)

== Episodes ==
No.	Title	Original release date	Prod. code
1	"Life! No Limits"	July 10, 2007	101
Jordan, fronting his own company that organizes parties for kids, aspires to throw a hip Hollywood club party (to his mother's chagrin). Elsewhere, Staci is apprehensive about attending Jordan's shindig because the rich kids will be there.
2	"Party Aftermath"	July 10, 2007	102
Jordan raises the ire of a club owner when he keeps all of his club party's profits. In other developments, a jittery Earl asks dancer Ashley for a date; and budding rapper Sal tries to enlist Willie to shoot photographs for his album.
3	"We Wanna Know"	July 17, 2007	103
As class president Gaven goes on a first date with streetwise Staci, the driven Roqui quarrels with her father over the purchase of her dream car. Elsewhere, a love triangle develops.
4	"Beach Party Fiasco"	July 24, 2007	104
Garnette's friends try to make amends when her birthday party goes awry. Meanwhile, Earl has trouble at home and hopes to stay with Daymeon.
5	"Date Night Drama"	July 31, 2007	105
The love triangle between Moriah, Gerren and Daymeon is getting really complicated...for Gerren that is.
6	"Don't Call Me"	August 7, 2007	106
Earl has two tough breaks when he bombs at a stand-up show and flubs a date with Ashley. Meanwhile, Sal and Willie keep their flirtation going.
7	"Setting Things Straight"	August 14, 2007	107
A dance recital keeps Ashley busy; Moriah tests his parents by sneaking out to see Gerren; Garnette and Jordan confront one another.
8	"Prom Night Tears"	August 21, 2007	108
Moriah supports Gerren as she commemorates her friend's death. Elsewhere, Staci bonds with her mother and the gang prepares for prom.
9	"Steppin' It Up"	August 28, 2007	109
The kids face big decisions as Sal asks Willie how she feels about him, Gerren considers dumping Moriah, and Staci weighs the pros and cons of college.
10	"Road to Success"	August 28, 2007	110
Ashley throws a graduation party; Sal takes the next step with his album; Gerren and Moriah evaluate their relationship; and Staci continues to contemplate college.
