= Gerren Taylor =

American model (1990–2021)

- Born: Ashlei Gerren Taylor; July 6, 1990; Los Angeles, California, United States
- Died: April 11, 2021 (aged 30)
- Occupations: Model, Actress
- Television: Baldwin Hills America the Beautiful
- Mother: Michele Gerren

Ashlei Gerren Taylor (6 July, 1990 – 11 April, 2021), Also known as Gerren Taylor, was an American model who appeared on the BET reality series Baldwin Hills, as well as the documentary America the Beautiful in 2007, which took a critical look at the United States of America’s obsession with beauty.

== Early life ==
Gerren was born in Los Angeles, California. At the age of 12, she was discovered by a talent scout in Los Angeles Park and began her modeling career. She eventually became the youngest model ever signed to the runway division of L.A. Models. Taylor also signed with the Ford Modeling Agency and worked with designers such as Tracy Reese, Tommy Hilfiger, and Betsey Johnson.

== Filmography ==
Year	Title	Role
1991	Ricochet	Baby daughter of Denzel Washington's lead character
2003	Ripley's Believe It or Not!	Herself
2007	Baldwin Hills	Herself
2007	America the Beautiful	Herself
