= Baldwin Hills season 2 =

Baldwin Hills
- Season 2
- Season 2 cast
- No. of episodes: 10

Release
- Original network: BET
- Original release: June 24 – August 19, 2008

Season chronology
- ← Previous; Season 1 Next → Season 3

The second season of Baldwin Hills premiered on June 24, 2008 and concluded on August 19, 2008.

== Cast ==
The following is a list of the cast members for the 2nd season.

- Main cast member
- Secondary cast member

Name	Information
Gerren	(Season 1 +)
Justin	(Season 2 +)
Moriah	(Season 1 +)
Seiko	(Season 2 +)
Staci	(Season 1 +)
Aunjel	(Season 2 +)
Johnathan	(Season 2 only)
Lor'Rena	(Season 2 only)
Ashley	(Season 1 and 2)
Sal	(Season 1 and 2)
La La	(Season 2 only)
Tee'Nee	(Season 1 and 2)

== Episodes ==
No.	Title	Original release date	Prod. code
1	"The Pop Off"	June 24, 2008	201
Sal hosts a party, at which Gerren and Lor'Rena each make a play for Moriah. Staci struggles with money issues. Seiko and Justin make a connection towards each other.
2	"Test of Will"	July 8, 2008	202
Justin talks about his past with his youth group and invites his friends to church with Kirk Franklin. Ashley and her sister prepare a speech honoring their mother. Gerren struggles with her feelings for Moriah while Lor'Rena schemes with Aunjel.
3	"Going at It!"	July 15, 2008	203
Lor'Rena tricks Moriah into a double date. Staci looks for new job opportunities. Justin and Seiko go on a date.
4	"Big Shots"	July 22, 2008	204
Justin gets his chance to impress a music producer; Jonathan's father warns him about getting into trouble; Staci's career dreams may be put on hold.
5	"Fashion Flair"	July 29, 2008	205
Gerren works a fashion show. Moriah tells his mom his true feelings about Gerren. Seiko's birthday party could be the site of conflict started by Gerren. At that party some tension builds up when Gerren and Lor'Rena gets into a conflict.
6	"It's Like That!"	July 29, 2008	206
Lor'Rena receives advice from her grandmother on her feud with Gerren. Meanwhile, Gerren confronts Moriah again. Sal has a date with LaLa and considers a new path. Johnathan reveals his secret to Ashley.
7	"Decisions, Decisions"	August 5, 2008	207
Ashley's parents ponder the future while she's at the prom. Johnathan receives a special gift. Lor'Rena is late for the prom. Staci receives life-changing news.
8	"Famous Aunties"	August 12, 2008	208
Staci and Kevin's relationship progresses. Moriah discusses his future with his parents. Ashley receives advice from her celebrity aunties Star Jones, Vivica A. Fox and Lela Rochon. Johnathan and Lor'Rena's romance heats up. Sal and Lala have a double date with Lor'Rena and Johnathan.
9	"The Glamorous Life"	August 19, 2008	209
Gerren anticipates her movie premiere and later receives advice from Justin about Moriah. Elsewhere, Sal interviews for an internship, Staci tells Seiko her secret, and the "Forgiveness Walk" is launched.
10	"Separate Ways"	August 19, 2008	210
Season 2 ends as Justin plans a reunion with his father. Elsewhere, Ashley throws a graduation party, Lor'Rena and Aunjel realize their paths are separating, and Staci has a first look at her baby.
