= Good Time Boys =

Song by Red Hot Chili Peppers

from the album Mother's Milk
- Released: 1989
- Recorded: November 1988 – March 1989
- Studio: Ocean Way and Image, Hollywood, California
- Genre: Funk metal, alternative metal
- Length: 5:02
- Label: EMI/Capitol Records
- Songwriter(s): Anthony Kiedis; Flea; John Frusciante; Chad Smith
- Producer(s): Michael Beinhorn

"Good Time Boys" is a song by American rock band Red Hot Chili Peppers and the first song from their 1989 album, Mother's Milk. The song contains excerpts of "Bonin' in the Boneyard" by Fishbone, "Try" by Thelonious Monster and "White Girl" by X. The song is also notable for including backing vocals by the band's former guitarist, Jack Sherman, who was fired in 1985.

The song was last performed live on the band's Mother's Milk tour. It was also teased in January 2013 and then again ten years later in January 2023, with both instances happening in Australia.

== Music video ==
The song was never released as a single however a promotional music video was shot and released in 1989 on the Hard 'n Heavy Vol. 2 video collection to promote the album.

The video features footage of the band performing the song with cut away footage of the band being interviewed discussing the album. The video has never officially been released by the band outside of this video collection, never played on television and never been released minus the interview footage. It is not acknowledged on the band's timeline as an official music video.

== Personnel ==
- Anthony Kiedis - lead vocals
- John Frusciante - guitar, backing vocals
- Flea - bass, backing vocals
- Chad Smith - drums

Additional musicians

- Vicki Calhoun – backing vocals
- Wag – backing vocals
- Randy Ruff – backing vocals
- Aklia Chinn – backing vocals
- Jack Sherman – backing vocals
- Joel Virgel Viergel – backing vocals
- Iris Parker – backing vocals
- Julie Ritter – backing vocals
- Gretchen Seager – backing vocals
- Laure Spinosa – backing vocals
- Sir Babs – backing vocals
- Merill Ward – backing vocals
- Bruno Deron – backing vocals
- Kristen Vigard – backing vocals
