= Baldwin Hills season 3 =

Baldwin Hills
- Season 3
- Season 3 cast
- No. of episodes: 10

Release
- Original network: BET
- Original release: January 27 – March 17, 2009

Season chronology
- ← Previous; Season 2

The third and final season of Baldwin Hills premiered on January 27, 2009 and concluded on March 17, 2009.

== Cast ==
The following is a list of the cast members for the 3rd season.

- Main cast member
- Secondary cast member

Name	Information
Etienne	(Season 3)
Gerren	(Season 1-3)
Justin	(Season 2-3)
Moriah	(Season 1-3)
Seiko	(Season 2-3)
Staci	(Season 1-3)
Trason	(Season 3)
Tyler	(Season 3)
Aunjel	(Season 2-3, regular in Season 2, not 3)
Aysia	(Season 3)
Kenny	(Season 3)
JoJo	Justin's best friend (Season 3)
Blair	Trason's crush (Season 3)

== Episodes ==
No.	Title	Original release date	Prod. code
1	"Turning Points"	January 27, 2009	301
Justin throws a party after his writing group signs a major deal; new cast members Tyler, Kenny, Trason and Etienne are introduced.
2	"Lets Talk..."	January 27, 2009	302
Kenny's kickback is shut down by his mother, Staci reveals she miscarried her baby.
3	"Put Your Game On"	February 3, 2009	303
Seiko & Kenny double date with Aysia & Justin, Tyler gets closer to Moriah despite Gerren's warning.
4	"Oh, That's Awkward"	February 10, 2009	304
Trason joins the DRE group, Staci shows up at the beach party, Gerren and Tyler argue, and Tyler and Moriah kiss.
5	"Keeping Their Cool"	February 17, 2009	305
Trason begins an internship; Gerren delays working on her fashion line; Seiko, Aysia and Staci plan a 1980s-themed party.
6	"Tough Questions"	February 24, 2009	306
Tyler meets Moriah's mom; Seiko and Justin are baptized.
7	"The Grill"	March 3, 2009	307
Gerren, Staci, and Seiko give back to the community. Justin and Aysia go on a date.
8	"Vegas Dreaming"	March 10, 2009	308
Seiko and Justin plan to go to Vegas, Trason goes on a date. The teens take part in the Divas Simply Singing charity event.
9	"Just Friends?"	March 17, 2009	309
The group goes to Vegas for Justin's birthday. Seiko also visits her new boyfriend during the trip. Elsewhere, Moriah and Tyler skip homecoming in favor of a more intimate date.
10	"Facing The Truth"	March 17, 2009	310
Trason throws a big Barack Obama party. Seiko is thinking of moving to Vegas for Cal, but a confession has her hesitating over her decision.
