= Show Me Your Soul =

Promotional single by Red Hot Chili Peppers

from the album Pretty Woman Soundtrack
- Released: 1990
- Genre: Funk rock
- Length: 4:22
- Label: EMI
- Songwriter(s): Anthony Kiedis; Flea; Chad Smith; John Frusciante
- Producer(s): Red Hot Chili Peppers; Norwood Fisher

Red Hot Chili Peppers singles chronology
"Taste the Pain" (1989)	"Show Me Your Soul" (1990)	"Give It Away" (1991)

Music video
- "Show Me Your Soul" on YouTube

"Show Me Your Soul" is a song by the alternative rock band Red Hot Chili Peppers that was recorded in 1989 and produced by John Norwood Fisher of Fishbone and features Billy Preston on keyboard. It was not, as is commonly believed, recorded during the Mother's Milk sessions. However, it was recorded during the first part of the Mother's Milk tour. "Show Me Your Soul" was recorded for the soundtrack of the film Pretty Woman, and was shortly after released as the B-side to "Taste the Pain" in the US and UK. In Australia, it appeared as the B-side to the belated 1990 release of "Knock Me Down". Both singles credit the song as coming from the Pretty Woman soundtrack. A promo only single was released to promote the soundtrack and it is thought that it was meant to be a full single until a last minute change of plan. This peaked at number ten on the Modern Rock Tracks chart. The track was later included as the sole exclusive track on the 1992 compilation album What Hits!?.

There was a music video made for the song, which features the band in front of a Bluescreen. The video was directed by Bill Stobaugh, and edited by Scott C. Wilson. It was released on February 14, 1990, and also appears on the What Hits!? VHS/DVD and the 1993 Beavis and Butt-Head episode "Sign Here".

The song has never been performed live by the band, although they did once lip sync it for "Save the Planet", a TV special on April 4, 1990.

== Track listing ==
12-inch and CD promo single (1990)

1. "Show Me Your Soul"

== Personnel ==
Red Hot Chili Peppers

- Anthony Kiedis – lead vocals
- Flea – bass, backing vocals
- John Frusciante – guitar, backing vocals
- Chad Smith – drums

Additional musicians

- Billy Preston – keyboards

== Charts ==
Chart (1990)	Peak position
US Alternative Airplay (Billboard)	10
