= Eileen Kelly =

American writer, sex educator and producer (born 1995)

Eileen Kelly (born August 8, 1995) is an American sex educator writer, producer, and host of the podcast Going Mental. She is the founder of the millennial sex ed and relationship blog Killer and a Sweet Thang. Kelly was nominated for a 2018 Shorty Award at the 10th Shorty Awards. Since 2023, Kelly has been an advocate for greater awareness surrounding borderline personality disorder.

== Early life ==
Kelly was raised by a single father in Seattle, Washington, and attended Catholic school for primary education. In an interview with Nylon, Kelly said that her social milieu in school was at once "uber-sexualized" and strongly repressive when it came to discussion about sex.

== Work ==
Kelly started a Tumblr blog, called Birds&Bees, while she was in high school. The blog featured sexual health and relationship advice and discussion and was heavily informed by online research and personal experiences. In 2013, while studying in The New School, she began blogging on Instagram and eventually won the nickname as the Dr. Ruth of the 21st century (after German sex therapist Dr. Ruth Westheimer). In an interview with W, Kelly noted that she had been a victim of cyberbullying and harassment due to the content she posted on Instagram.

Kelly started her blog Killer and a Sweet Thang in 2016, eventually sharing management of the site with a staff of writers and contributors. In 2018, Kelly published the book Pull Out, aimed at educating millennials about safe sex practices. She teaches at sex education workshops and awareness campaigns, collaborating with organizations like Women and Youth Supporting Each Other.

In 2018, Kelly was nominated at the 10th Shorty Awards in the Activism category for her efforts to carry out public discussions on taboo topics involving sex education.

== Going Mental with Eileen Kelly Podcast ==
In 2019, Kelly launched the podcast Pillow Talk where she interviewed guests on sex and sexuality. She later rebranded the podcast, calling it Going Mental with Eileen Kelly. Guests have included Amanda Knox and Camilla Mendes, amongst others.

== Borderline personality disorder and advocacy ==
In 2023, Eileen Kelly publicly revealed that she had been diagnosed with borderline personality disorder after years of struggling with symptoms including emotional instability and chronic feelings of emptiness. Kelly stated that she met all nine diagnostic criteria for the disorder at the time of admission to McLean Hospital. Following her diagnosis, she became an outspoken advocate for reducing stigma surrounding BPD and other personality disorders through her podcast, Going Mental with Eileen Kelly.

== Personal life ==
As of April 2026, Kelly is in a relationship with rock singer Anthony Kiedis, who is more than 30 years her senior. Kelly wrote an article in Vogue detailing her experience dating a much older man and called out the stigmas society has against people involved in age-gap relationships.
