= America the Beautiful (2007 film) =

- Theatrical release poster
- Directed by: Darryl Roberts
- Written by: Darryl Roberts
- Produced by: Michele G. Bluthenthal; Roderick Gatlin; Stela Georgieva
- Starring: Darryl Roberts; Paris Hilton; Anthony Kiedis; Jessica Simpson; Martin Short; Eve Ensler
- Narrated by: Darryl Roberts
- Cinematography: Gavin Wynn
- Music by: Michael Bearden
- Distributed by: First Independent Pictures
- Release dates: March 30, 2007 (AFI Dallas Film Festival); August 1, 2008 (United States)
- Running time: 105 minutes
- Country: United States
- Language: English

America the Beautiful is a 2007 American documentary film about self-image in the United States directed by Darryl Roberts. The film had a limited release on August 1, 2008.
