= Taste the Pain =

Single by Red Hot Chili Peppers

from the album Mother's Milk
- B-side: "Millionaires Against Hunger", "Show Me Your Soul"
- Released: June 11, 1990
- Studio: Track Record (North Hollywood)
- Genre: Funk rock
- Length: 4:33 (album); 5:02 (Say Anything... version)
- Label: EMI
- Songwriters: Flea; John Frusciante; Anthony Kiedis; D.H. Peligro
- Producer: Michael Beinhorn

Red Hot Chili Peppers singles chronology
"Knock Me Down" (1989)	"Taste the Pain" (1990)	"Show Me Your Soul" (1990)

12" pop-out sleeve single
- This version of the single features a popout logo and band picture.

Music video
- "Taste the Pain" on YouTube

"Taste the Pain" is a song by the American rock band Red Hot Chili Peppers from the album Mother's Milk, and was the third and final single from that album. The music video was filmed with the band playing in an art room, where artists are in the middle of painting a mural artwork, directed by Tom Stern and Alex Winter.

The song was recorded after Chad Smith joined the band as the drummer, however, on this record, drums are played by Fishbone's Philip "Fish" Fisher and was the first song John Frusciante recorded with the band. When the song is played backwards, the voice heard at the start is Anthony Kiedis clearly singing the chorus. This song also features a trumpet solo by Flea. A slightly longer version of the song was featured on the soundtrack for the film Say Anything... and preceded the Mother's Milk version. The film was also notable as Kiedis's girlfriend at the time, Ione Skye, was one of the stars of the film.

The single contained two original B-sides. "Show Me Your Soul" was recorded in late 1989 and was also released as a single in 1990 when it was featured on the soundtrack for the film Pretty Woman. "Millionaires Against Hunger" was recorded during sessions for 1985's Freaky Styley.

The single reached number twenty-nine in the UK—the highest position for the band up to that point.

== Live performances ==
Despite being a popular single for the band, the song was rarely performed live, last appearing during the Mother's Milk tour in 1989.

== Track listing ==
7" radio promo single

1. "All for Love" by Nancy Wilson
2. "Taste the Pain" by Red Hot Chili Peppers

"Unbridled Funk and Roll 4 Your Soul!" limited edition CD single

1. "Taste the Pain" (album version)
2. "Millionaires Against Hunger"
3. "Castles Made of Sand" (live; unreleased)
4. "Higher Ground" (Daddy-O Mix)

1990 UK cassette single

1. "Taste the Pain"
2. "Show Me Your Soul"

1990 UK CD single

1. "Taste the Pain" (single version)
2. "Taste the Pain" (LP version)
3. "Show Me Your Soul" (unreleased)
4. "Nevermind"

12" pop-out sleeve

1. "Taste the Pain" (album version)
2. "Show Me Your Soul" (unreleased)
3. "If You Want Me to Stay"
4. "Nevermind"

7" single

1. "Taste the Pain" (album version)
2. "Show Me Your Soul" (unreleased)

7" limited edition square disc single

1. "Taste the Pain" (album version)
2. "Show Me Your Soul" (unreleased)
3. "Castles Made of Sand" (live; unreleased)

7" promo single

1. "Taste the Pain" (album version)
2. "Castles Made of Sand" (live; unreleased)
3. "Special Secret Song Inside" (live; unreleased)
4. "F.U." (live; unreleased)

== Personnel ==
Red Hot Chili Peppers

- Anthony Kiedis – lead vocals
- John Frusciante – guitar, backing vocals
- Flea – bass, trumpet, backing vocals

Additional musicians

- Philip "Fish" Fisher – drums
- Dave Coleman – cello

== Charts ==
Chart (1990)	Peak position
Europe (Eurochart Hot 100)	71
UK Singles (OCC)	29
