= Mother's Milk (album) =

1989 studio album by Red Hot Chili Peppers

Studio album by Red Hot Chili Peppers
- Released: August 16, 1989
- Recorded: November 1988 – March 1989
- Studio: Ocean Way and Image (Hollywood); Track Record (North Hollywood)
- Genre: Funk metal; alternative metal; funk rock
- Length: 44:52
- Label: EMI USA
- Producer: Michael Beinhorn

Red Hot Chili Peppers chronology
The Abbey Road E.P. (1988)	Mother's Milk (1989)	Blood Sugar Sex Magik (1991)

Singles from Mother's Milk
- 1. "Higher Ground" Released: April 1989; 2. "Knock Me Down" Released: August 1989; 3. "Taste the Pain" Released: June 1990

Mother's Milk is the fourth studio album by American rock band Red Hot Chili Peppers, released on August 16, 1989, by EMI Records. It is the band's first album to feature drummer Chad Smith and guitarist John Frusciante, who replaced drummer Jack Irons and founding guitarist Hillel Slovak, respectively. After Slovak's death and Irons' subsequent departure, vocalist Anthony Kiedis and bassist Flea regrouped with the addition of Frusciante and Smith. Frusciante's influence altered the band's sound by placing more emphasis on melody than rhythm, which had dominated the band's previous material. Returning producer Michael Beinhorn favored heavy metal guitar riffs as well as overdubbing. Frusciante perceived Beinhorn's taste as excessive, and as a result, the two constantly fought over the album's guitar sound.

Mother's Milk was a greater commercial success than the band's first three albums, peaking at number 52 on the US Billboard 200. It received widespread airplay for the three singles which are the cover of Stevie Wonder's "Higher Ground", "Knock Me Down" and "Taste the Pain", and it became their first gold record in early 1990. Although it was not met with the same positive critical reception that its predecessor The Uplift Mofo Party Plan (1987) had garnered, Mother's Milk was the first step for the band in achieving international success and, according to Amy Hanson of AllMusic, "turned the tide and transformed the band from underground funk-rocking rappers to mainstream bad boys with seemingly very little effort."

== Background ==
After Red Hot Chili Peppers received a record deal with EMI Records in 1983, the group established themselves as a prominent funk rock band with their 1984 debut album The Red Hot Chili Peppers. Disappointed with the results of the production, vocalist Anthony Kiedis and bassist Flea replaced guitarist Jack Sherman with founding member Hillel Slovak, who had quit his band, What Is This?, several weeks before. The group's George Clinton-produced second album, Freaky Styley (1985), was Slovak's first effort with the band. The Uplift Mofo Party Plan, which was released in 1987, saw the return of original drummer Jack Irons who had left the band prior to the recording of their debut album. The album, a critical success that peaked at number 148 on the Billboard 200, is the only Red Hot Chili Peppers album the original members recorded together. Shortly following the ensuing tour, Slovak died of a heroin overdose and left the rest of the group in complete shock; Irons, citing an inability to cope with the death, quit. Kiedis and Flea, similarly devastated, were determined to persevere despite the loss of two key members. In September 1988 they chose DeWayne "Blackbyrd" McKnight, a friend of Clinton's and former member of the funk band Parliament, to replace Slovak on guitar; D. H. Peligro, formerly of the punk rock outfit, Dead Kennedys, replaced Irons. Band manager Lindy Goetz realized that McKnight and Peligro were not well suited for the Chili Peppers, and the two were fired within several months of joining.

The band was not without a guitarist for long. In October 1988, Kiedis and Flea found a replacement for McKnight in teenage guitarist John Frusciante. Flea had originally directed Frusciante to audition for the band Thelonious Monster. An avid Red Hot Chili Peppers fan, Frusciante was, according to Flea, "a really talented and knowledgeable musician. He [Frusciante] knows all the shit I don't know. I basically know nothing about music theory and he's studied it to death, inside and out. He's a very disciplined musician—all he cares about are his guitar and his cigarettes." Frusciante was also not very familiar with the funk genre: "I wasn't really a funk player before I joined the band. I learned everything I needed to know about how to sound good with Flea by studying Hillel [Slovak]'s playing and I just took it sideways from there." The band was now once again without a drummer and were forced to hold open auditions. The last to audition, Chad Smith, was a six-foot three-inch tall drummer who, according to Flea, "lit a fire under our asses." Kiedis later said the audition with Smith left "[the band] in a state of frenzied laughter that we couldn't shake out of for a half an hour."

== Recording and production ==
Unlike the stop-start sessions for The Uplift Mofo Party Plan, where Kiedis would frequently disappear to seek drugs, pre-production for Mother's Milk went smoothly. Many of the songs had already been written, and some were even recorded by the time the band started pre-production in January 1989. "Taste the Pain" was recorded before Smith joined, and it featured Philip "Fish" Fisher of Fishbone on drums. The band recorded basic tracks at Hully Gully studios in Silver Lake; songs like "Knock Me Down" were formed from jam sessions without any input from returning producer Michael Beinhorn. According to Flea, the Hully Gully sessions bore fruit: "We played hard and fast more than [at] any other time in our career, I think. A lot of chops were going down [...] we played constantly, got to know each other, and came up with a record." Kiedis and Flea recognized that Frusciante's presence had become a significant influence on the band's new material as the Hully Gully sessions were proving to be extremely productive; Flea recalled that "[Frusciante] was an immense new element to the sound of our band and a big opening up for us."

The band entered the Ocean Way Recording studio in Hollywood in February 1989 to record Mother's Milk. "It was weird when I first joined the band because we recorded the album after I'd been in the band for just a few months and Chad had actually been in for just two weeks," Frusciante recalled. "I was still a little bit confused about my position and we were just like four individuals. Music is all about welding people into a unit and with all the touring we've been doing we're now like an eight-armed cosmic octopus!" Beinhorn pushed the Chili Peppers to produce the best possible takes for each of the record's 13 tracks while the band hoped to obtain a hit record.

Although there had been stress and conflict during the recording of other Chili Peppers albums, the sessions for Mother's Milk were uncomfortable thanks to Beinhorn's incessant desire to create a hit. He recalled that he and the band were at odds, saying, "Suffice to say that I had a very intense personal relationship [with the band] and somewhere along the line I fell out with [them]." Beinhorn constantly clashed with Frusciante over guitar effects. According to Kiedis, "[Beinhorn] wanted John to have a big, crunching, almost metal-sounding guitar tone whereas before we always had some interesting acid-rock guitar tones as well as a lot of slinky, sexy, funky guitar tones." Frusciante was frustrated with Beinhorn's attitude, and he resented his playing on the record, thinking that it was too "macho". Kiedis recalled that, in the end, "I couldn't tolerate his direction any longer. He was trying to squeeze something out of me that I wasn't feeling, and we got in a fight and I knew that I was done with him."

In March 1989, the Chili Peppers embarked on a two-month tour to break-in the new lineup. The "Positive Mental Octopus tour" saw the band play small venues throughout the United States, including several concerts on the East and West Coasts. At this time, Frusciante began asserting more energy and his ego "got a little swollen," according to Flea. "He was running around being rude to girls and getting them pissed off. But that's to be expected, I mean, shit, you're 18 years old and you want to get laid really bad and all of a sudden you're in a band, the girls want to fuck. You're bound to go crazy." Another incident, following a performance at the George Mason University in Fairfax, Virginia, caused legal repercussions; a student accused Kiedis of engaging in sexual misconduct and indecent exposure. Kiedis was subsequently arrested and released on bail pending a trial that was to be set for a later date.

== Music ==
"Knock Me Down"
"Knock Me Down", the first single from Mother's Milk, exemplifies a stylistic divergence away from the band's typical punk and funk rock into more alternative territory. The track was originally intended to be a duet between guitarist John Frusciante and vocalist Anthony Kiedis but was mixed in a way that Frusciante's voice is more prominent.

"Higher Ground"
The cover of Stevie Wonder's "Higher Ground" epitomizes the heavy distortion and layering found throughout Mother's Milk. The second single from the album, "Higher Ground" saw more international success than "Knock Me Down" despite performing worse on the Billboard Modern Rock Tracks.

The band's style of music developed with the arrival of Frusciante; producer Michael Beinhorn observed, "It was apparent early on that John was the perfect guitarist for the band—he brought the elements of songwriting and composition to the band which they'd never truly had prior to his involvement. I believe that John is a pivotal figure in the Chili Peppers, being that he is such a distinctive songwriter." Frusciante altered the band's sound by introducing melodies, harmonies and more-complex song structures. In contrast to the group's previous albums, which featured groove and rhythm-based songs, Mother's Milk contained melodic compositions that reflected the new guitarist's influence. Per music journalist Jeff Apter, most of the record, due to Beinhorn's presence, is composed of heavy metal guitar riffs and excessive layering. Musically, Mother's Milk has been described as funk metal, alternative metal, and funk rock.

Mother's Milk features an array of musical styles in its 13 tracks. Among the songs that surfaced from the Hully Gully sessions in early 1989, "Knock Me Down" became one of the most radical shifts in style for the band. The introspective lyrics, which analyze the death of Hillel Slovak and the devastating effect drugs can have on life, were a new approach for Kiedis, who primarily wrote of sexual intercourse and a hedonistic lifestyle. Kiedis did not, however, want the track to be associated with "anti-drug" sentiments, claiming, "[the song] is about letting your friends know that you need help and then being willing to accept the help of others when you need it, whether it's from drugs, or from a number of other personal problems." According to Apter, the song "Knock Me Down" was "clearly the most important track the band had ever laid down; it proved that these Peppers were more than knuckleheads with socks hanging off their cocks." Musically, the track integrates the Chili Peppers' typical punk influences, but asserts heavier emphasis on melody and harmonics that lead into more alternative territory. "Knock Me Down" was originally recorded to be a duet between Kiedis and Frusciante, but the song was remixed before being released as a single; the new mix inadvertently emphasized Frusciante's voice instead of Kiedis's.

"Higher Ground" became another song that helped the band achieve international success. Written and originally recorded in 1973 by R&B singer Stevie Wonder, the track was, according to Flea, a perfect cover for the band: "[...] the lyrics are great. Especially as far as the situation that the band has been in, as far as state of mind, for the past few months. That song is really about raising and uplifting yourself spiritually." Flea said the band covered the song to pay homage to Wonder and the important role he played in popular music. The cover begins with a funk bass-line, followed by multi-layered heavy metal guitar progressions and effects-treated vocals. "Higher Ground"'s chorus features backing vocals from an array of friends and engineers who worked on the record; the individuals' competence in singing was irrelevant to the band because they sought to achieve a sense of unity. Mother's Milk was composed of a variety of songs that expanded the Chili Peppers' repertoire. The instrumental "Pretty Little Ditty" was one of the few songs that featured no guitar layering; Apter notes that the song is "a dreamy, sweetly stoned instrumental" that "featured deft picking and strumming from Frusciante, intertwined with blasts of trumpet from Flea." The eclectic track was originally intended to be more than three minutes long, but was cut to just under two minutes before the album's release. The song "Punk Rock Classic" quotes the guitar riff of "Sweet Child o' Mine" by Guns N' Roses. "Taste the Pain" reflects a more meditative and melodic theme, similar to "Knock Me Down." Frusciante introduces psychedelic guitar progressions in the verse, while the lyrics touch on themes of love and loss. Other tracks such as "Stone Cold Bush" presented topics of prostitution while "Punk Rock Classic" was, in retrospect, an emulation of typical punk rock songs by Black Flag and The Germs—bands that were influential to the Chili Peppers.

== Album artwork ==
Mother's Milk features a black-and-white photograph of the band sprawled across the arms of a giant topless woman, with her nipples covered by a red rose on the right, and Kiedis standing up on the left. Controversy arose when the model Dawn Alane claimed the band did not notify her that she was the one chosen to be on the cover of Mother's Milk. Furthermore, several national chains refused to sell the record because they believed the female subject displayed too much nudity. A more strictly censored version was manufactured for some retailers that featured the band members in far larger proportion than the original. The cover of the record was influenced by a promotional poster Kiedis had from the 1960s of Sly and the Family Stone, in which frontman Sly Stone held a miniaturized band in his palm. When Kiedis was finding shots of the band to use on the cover, Frusciante initially refused every photograph Kiedis showed him but settled on one of him sitting down laughing.

Mother's Milk was affixed with an "explicit language" warning sticker that, according to Kiedis, "Doesn't bother me. Our lyrics are very explicit, whether it's about sex or friendship or love for life in general." The cover booklet of the record features a painting by Hillel Slovak. Following the album's release, a limited number of promotional posters were issued with the model's breasts exposed. Alane had no knowledge of the pressing and sued the band, winning a $50,000 settlement.

The singles for Mother's Milk followed a similar artistic theme. The cover of "Knock Me Down" featured the band shirtless, in front of a photograph of an elephant in an African setting. "Higher Ground" was similar in that all four members — photographs of which were taken from the music video — were printed in front of a large image of Kiedis's face. "Taste the Pain" featured the band together with a red and yellow background with the Chili Peppers' asterisk adjacent to the typeface.

== Promotion and release ==
A promotional 12" titled For the Thrashers, which contained four songs from the album, was released to radio stations to promote the then forthcoming album in the weeks leading up to its release. Director Drew Carolan shot a promotional video for "Good Time Boys" which was released on the 1989 Hard 'n Heavy Vol. 2 collection. The video, which has never been released elsewhere by the band or even acknowledged as an official video, featured the band performing the song with cut away scenes of the band being interviewed discussing the album and their sound. Carolan was also hired to film the music videos for album's first two singles, "Higher Ground" and "Knock Me Down" before the release of Mother's Milk. The initial premise for "Higher Ground" was to have the song's original writer, Stevie Wonder, sit in the lotus position as the Chili Peppers dance around him; however, Wonder declined to be in the video. Kiedis gave full creative license to Carolan on the condition that he "make us [the band] look like the Gods of Funk." While the video for "Higher Ground" was intended to be upbeat and exuberant, "Knock Me Down" was filmed to be more poignant; Carolan recalls, "It was a very special track for the band and it needed to be treated with the utmost care and respect. Anthony and Flea just wanted it to be real soulful with a sense of urgency." The videos took a day each to complete and were filmed with relatively small budgets, but the outcome, as Jeff Apter notes, "[B]ecame key elements of [the album's] success." "Knock Me Down" is notable for featuring an appearance by actor Alex Winter, who would co-direct the video for the band's third single, "Taste the Pain". MTV introduced the band's videos into their daily rotation, highlighting the band as up-and-coming and "one to watch".

== Critical reception ==
Professional ratings
Review scores
Source	Rating
AllMusic	3.5/5 stars
Encyclopedia of Popular Music	3/5 stars
Los Angeles Times	2.5/4 stars
MusicHound Rock	3/5
The Rolling Stone Album Guide	3/5 stars
Spin Alternative Record Guide	5/10
The Village Voice	C+

Although more commercially successful than the band's previous albums, Mother's Milk received mixed reviews from critics who were unimpressed with the excessive distortion found throughout the album. However, it was praised as well; Amy Hanson of AllMusic called it "a pivotal album for the Red Hot Chili Peppers," and believed that "if anyone doubted the pulsating power that leapt from the blistering opener, 'Good Time Boys', it took only a few bars of the Red Hot Chili Peppers' outrageous, and brilliant, interpretation of the Stevie Wonder classic 'Higher Ground' to prove that this new lineup was onto something special. Wrapping up with the aptly titled and truly punked-out 'Punk Rock Classic' and the band's own punched-up tribute to 'Magic Johnson', Mother's Milk was everything the band had hoped for, and a little more besides." Steve Morse of The Boston Globe called it a "high-octane fusion of metal, funk and rap—sort of Prince meets Jimi Hendrix in the Twilight Zone," while noting that "Knock Me Down" combined "electrifying musicianship". The Toronto Star commented that the Red Hot Chili Peppers were "the Mothers of Invention for the 1990s." In 2005, Mother's Milk was ranked number 359 in Rock Hard magazine's book The 500 Greatest Rock & Metal Albums of All Time.

While Carly Darlin of the Orange County Register found the album to be "an energetic and fun restatement of the RHCP whiplash funk attitude", she believed that "with the exception of the dreamy instrumental 'Pretty Little Ditty', it doesn't break any new ground." She continued by saying that, if anything "Mother's Milk is a slight step away from the party-funk grooves of the last two albums and a return to the band's punk-rock roots. They even reprise the cover of Jimi Hendrix's 'Fire', which they did as a B-side for their 'Fight Like A Brave' 12-inch two years ago." Furthermore, Mark Jenkins of The Washington Post said "the polite term for albums like 'Milk' is 'eclectic', but it really sounds as if the band is unraveling [...] Considering the circumstances, it's not especially surprising that the album seems to be looking for someone to give it directions." However, Jenkins did believe Frusciante possessed "solid metal chops and means to show them off." Village Voice critic Robert Christgau mocked the band's ability to promote empathy and found the guitar layering in Mother's Milk to have been done improperly: "punks who loved Hendrix and P-Funk way way back, they're finally cashing in on their good taste, and though unbelievers dis their sincerity, execution's the problem. They didn't have the chops to bring it off then, and by pushing the guitar up front they sound even cruder now. But they're perfectly nice fellas, really—mention 'compassion' in the very first verse."

== Commercial performance ==
Released on August 16, 1989, Mother's Milk peaked at number 52 on the U.S. Billboard 200, and number 32 on the U.S. Cash Box album charts. The record failed to chart in the United Kingdom and Europe, but climbed to number 33 in Australia. "Knock Me Down" reached number six on the U.S. Modern Rock Tracks whereas "Higher Ground" charted at number eleven; the latter of the two ultimately proved to be more successful, however, by influencing foreign charts at number 54 in the UK and 45 in Australia and France. While "Taste the Pain" did not chart in the U.S., the single reached number 26 in the UK—the group's first Top 40 single in the region. The success the Red Hot Chili Peppers achieved with Mother's Milk was something the group had been working towards since the release of their debut album; Apter notes, "After five hard years, several departures, sackings and one tragic death, the Peppers were now much more than a hometown sensation." The band had played numerous concerts before the album's release and aired new songs weekly to generate interest in it. Mother's Milk was certified gold by the Recording Industry Association of America in late March 1990—it is now certified platinum—and was the first Chili Peppers album to ship in excess of 500,000 units. In 2003 the album was re-released through EMI; all tracks were completely remastered and an additional six songs were included as well as hand written liner notes from Flea.

== Mother's Milk tour and aftermath ==
Mother's Milk instantly garnered more attention than the band's previous records and, as such, the venues the band performed in were able to accommodate far larger crowds. For the first time the band also upgraded to a full-fledged tour bus and added backup musicians and singers. Longtime friend, Keith "Tree" Barry was added to play horns and backup singers Kristen Vigard and Vicki Calhoun (who appeared in the video for "Knock Me Down") also joined the tour. When the band hit England, roadie Robbie Allen (nicknamed Rob Rule) would open for the band providing a comedy performance in which he would pretend to cut off his own penis. Allen would later become one of the band's backup singers on the One Hot Minute tour. The album's official launch, however, was held in New York City at a club called Tramps; following this, Red Hot Chili Peppers embarked on an introductory European tour which included a free show in Amsterdam's Dam Square that attracted over 10,000 attendees. On September 8, 1989, the band commenced their North American leg in Seattle. The leg saw an overwhelmingly positive response from critics across the country; following a concert in Portland, journalist John Foyston of The Oregonian noted the "Hollywood-based quartet fomented an audience reaction that had to be seen to be believed. The stage-divers started rushing the stage from the moment the band walked on. Once on stage, it was an issue of luck and chutzpah." Todd Caudle of the Colorado Springs newspaper The Gazette said the Chili Peppers' performance at the Colorado Indoor Sports Complex was "the kind of place where kids could be kids, and no one cared if soft drinks stuck to the floor and the rafters shook with a stunning barrage of decibels. People in the audience, steeped in sweat and pressing against the barricade in front of the stage, threw their arms up in unison and barked out approval of one fast, furiously-played song after another."

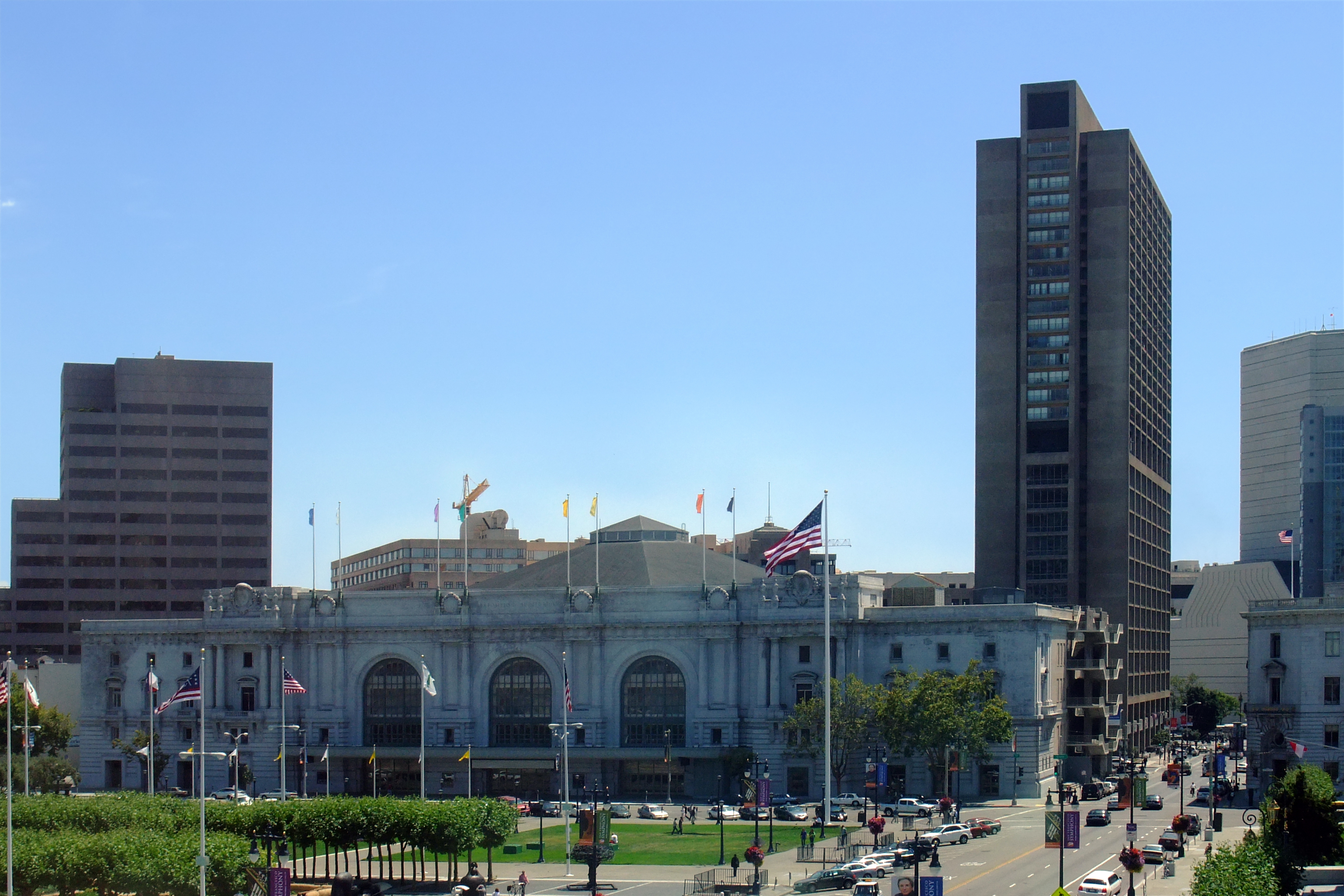
The band's tour to promote Mother's Milk included a performance at the San Francisco Civic Auditorium to their biggest crowd to date.

By the end of the leg, the band members were having trouble adjusting to their newfound fame as virtually every concert on the tour was sold out and Mother's Milk approached 500,000 units sold. Spin reported that following a show in Atlanta, Flea invited a woman to his hotel room for sexual intercourse, but locked himself in the bathroom upon arriving because all he could think of were his wife and daughter. Kiedis ended a two-year long relationship with actress Ione Skye, and Frusciante, looking back on the tour years later, admitted, "I was totally abusing the situation [...] partying and screwing a bunch of girls. At 19, I might have looked like a stud but I was a weakling inside. I wasn't proud of who I was then." Shortly before the end of the North American leg, the band filmed a performance at the Long Beach Arena, which was released as Psychedelic Sexfunk Live from Heaven in 1990. A concert at the San Francisco Civic Auditorium on New Year's Eve 1989 attracted over 10,000 attendees and was considered by band photographer Tony Woolliscroft to be "the biggest [concert] I had seen them play at that point. It gave me a handle on how hard the band had worked in the USA in the years prior to this."

The tour continued in the United Kingdom, where the band was receiving less attention; Kiedis complained after several shows there, "We're huge in the States and it's sort of frustrating and confusing that no one knows who we are here." It was not until after their return from the UK that "Taste the Pain" was released as a single and subsequently charted at number twenty-nine there. In March 1990, the band was asked to perform on MTV's coverage of Spring break in Florida. At the event, Flea and Smith attempted to engage the audience by jumping from the stage; the situation got out of hand, and the two were alleged to have sexually assaulted and verbally abused a female audience member. They were arrested several days later on charges of battery, disorderly conduct and solicitation to commit a lascivious act, but released on $2,000 bail. Smith and Flea's arrest worsened Kiedis's impending charge in Virginia from the "Positive Mental Octopus" tour. He was convicted of sexual battery and indecent exposure and sentenced to pay a fine of $1,000 per charge.

The Chili Peppers wound up the Mother's Milk tour with a variety of performances that included the 1990 Pinkpop Festival and several other large-scale concerts. Once complete, the band rested, and Frusciante and Flea organized a short-lived side project called H.A.T.E. with Fishbone vocalist Angelo Moore and L.A. Guns drummer Nickey Alexander. EMI capitalized on the recent interest in the Chili Peppers by releasing a music video compilation VHS called Positive Mental Octopus, which was named after the tour, in 1990. That same year the band also released "Show Me Your Soul", a song that was originally a b-side on the "Knock Me Down" single, on the soundtrack to the hit romantic comedy film, Pretty Woman. The song was a minor hit for the band and a music video was made. For unknown reasons the band also recorded a cover of the Bachman–Turner Overdrive song, "Takin' Care of Business," however the song would never be released.

== 25th anniversary ==
On January 29, 2014, Chad Smith announced that EMI was planning to release a 25th anniversary version of the album later in the year, which would contain bonus material. In an August 2014 interview with Rolling Stone, Smith discussed the anniversary and legacy of the album, commenting that a remastered version was still in the works which would likely include a live show recorded in Cleveland, Ohio on a bonus disc. However, he reckoned that many of the outtakes from the record have already been released. As of 2026, EMI has yet to re-release the album.

== Track listing ==
All tracks are written by Red Hot Chili Peppers (Anthony Kiedis, Flea, John Frusciante and Chad Smith) except where noted.

Mother's Milk track listing
No.	Title	Writer(s)	Length
1.	"Good Time Boys"		5:01
2.	"Higher Ground"	Stevie Wonder	3:22
3.	"Subway to Venus"		4:25
4.	"Magic Johnson"		2:57
5.	"Nobody Weird Like Me"		3:48
6.	"Knock Me Down"		3:43
7.	"Taste the Pain"		4:33
8.	"Stone Cold Bush"	Red Hot Chili Peppers; D.H. Peligro	3:05
9.	"Fire"	Jimi Hendrix	2:03
10.	"Pretty Little Ditty" (instrumental)		1:36
11.	"Punk Rock Classic"		1:46
12.	"Sexy Mexican Maid"	Red Hot Chili Peppers; Peligro	3:21
13.	"Johnny, Kick a Hole in the Sky"		5:10
Total length:			44:52

Bonus tracks on 2003 remastered CD version
No.	Title	Writer(s)	Length
14.	"Song That Made Us What We Are Today" (instrumental)		12:56
15.	"Knock Me Down" (original long version)		4:44
16.	"Sexy Mexican Maid" (original long version)		3:59
17.	"Salute to Kareem" (instrumental demo)		3:24
18.	"Castles Made of Sand" (live)	Hendrix	3:19
19.	"Crosstown Traffic" (live)	Hendrix	2:51

=== Notes ===
- "Good Time Boys" contains excerpts of "Bonin' in the Boneyard" by Fishbone, "Try" by Thelonious Monster and "White Girl" by X.
- An extended version of "Pretty Little Ditty" running some 3:07 is included on the 2003 remaster of the album.
- Tracks 18 and 19 recorded live on November 21, 1989, at Phantasy Theater, Cleveland, Ohio, US.
- "Johnny, Kick a Hole in the Sky" features a fragment of The Star Spangled Banner in the beginning of the song.

=== DVD ===
- The Making of the Album
- The Videos: Good Time Boys
- Live Concerts

== Personnel ==
Personnel taken from Mother's Milk CD booklet.

Red Hot Chili Peppers

- Anthony Kiedis – lead vocals
- John Frusciante – guitar (all except "Fire"), co-lead vocals on "Knock Me Down"
- Flea – bass, trumpet on "Subway to Venus", "Taste the Pain", and "Pretty Little Ditty"
- Chad Smith – drums (all except "Taste the Pain" and "Fire")

Additional musicians

- Vicki Calhoun – backing vocals on "Good Time Boys", "Higher Ground", "Knock Me Down", and "Johnny, Kick a Hole in the Sky"
- Wag – backing vocals on "Good Time Boys" and "Higher Ground"
- Randy Ruff – backing vocals on "Good Time Boys" and "Higher Ground"
- Aklia Chinn – backing vocals on "Good Time Boys", "Higher Ground", and "Johnny, Kick a Hole in the Sky"
- Jack Sherman – backing vocals on "Good Time Boys" and "Higher Ground"
- Joel Virgel Viergel – backing vocals on "Good Time Boys" and "Higher Ground"
- Iris Parker – backing vocals on "Good Time Boys" and "Higher Ground"
- Julie Ritter – backing vocals on "Good Time Boys" and "Higher Ground"
- Gretchen Seager – backing vocals on "Good Time Boys" and "Higher Ground"
- Laure Spinosa – backing vocals on "Good Time Boys" and "Higher Ground"
- Sir Babs – backing vocals on "Good Time Boys" and "Higher Ground"
- Merill Ward – backing vocals on "Good Time Boys" and "Higher Ground"
- Bruno Deron – backing vocals on "Good Time Boys" and "Higher Ground"
- Kristen Vigard – backing vocals on "Good Time Boys", "Higher Ground", and "Johnny, Kick a Hole in the Sky"
- Patrick English – trumpet on "Subway to Venus"
- Keith "The Tree" Barry – tenor saxophone on "Subway to Venus"
- Lon – trombone on "Subway to Venus"
- Dave Coleman – cello on "Taste The Pain"
- Philip "Fish" Fisher – drums on "Taste the Pain"
- Hillel Slovak – guitar on "Fire"
- Jack Irons – drums on "Fire"

Production

- Michael Beinhorn – production, additional engineering
- Dave Jerden – mixing
- Garth Richardson – engineering (all except "Taste the Pain")
- Eddie DeLena – engineering on "Taste the Pain"
- George Marino – mastering

Design

- Henry Marquez, Peter Shea – art direction/design
- Nels Israelson – photography
- Anthony Kiedis – art concept
- Hillel Slovak – back cover painting

== Charts ==
Chart performance for Mother's Milk
Chart (1989–1990)	Peak position
Australian Albums (ARIA)	33
Dutch Albums (Album Top 100)	69
New Zealand Albums (RMNZ)	47
US Billboard 200	52

== Certifications ==
Certifications for Mother's Milk
Region	Certification	Certified units/sales
Canada (Music Canada)	Gold	50,000^{^}
United Kingdom (BPI)	Silver	60,000^{^}
United States (RIAA)	Platinum	1,000,000^{^}
^{^} Shipments figures based on certification alone.
