= Higher Ground (Stevie Wonder song) =

1973 single by Stevie Wonder

- Cover for the 7" single in Germany.

Single by Stevie Wonder

from the album Innervisions
- B-side: "Too High"
- Released: July 1973
- Recorded: May 12, 1973
- Genre: Funk
- Length: 3:42 (album version); 3:10 (single version)
- Label: Tamla
- Songwriter: Stevie Wonder
- Producers: Stevie Wonder; Malcolm Cecil; Robert Margouleff

Stevie Wonder singles chronology
"You Are the Sunshine of My Life" (1973)	"Higher Ground" (1973)	"Living for the City" (1973)

Official audio
- "Higher Ground" on YouTube

"Higher Ground" is a song written by Stevie Wonder which first appeared on his 1973 album Innervisions. The song reached number 4 on the Billboard Hot 100 and number 1 on the US Hot R&B Singles chart. Wonder wrote and recorded the song in a three-hour burst of creativity in May 1973. The album version of the song contains an extra verse and runs 30 seconds longer than the single version.

The song was released in the UK but achieved only modest success, reaching number 29 on the UK Singles Chart.

== Background ==
The song lyrics address the issue of reincarnation. Wonder commented, when interviewed by The New York Times:

I would like to believe in reincarnation. I would like to believe that there is another life. I think that sometimes your consciousness can happen on this earth a second time around. For me, I wrote "Higher Ground" even before the accident. But something must have been telling me that something was going to happen to make me aware of a lot of things and to get myself together. This is like my second chance for life, to do something or to do more, and to value the fact that I am alive.

According to Billboard, the lyrics are about "people who are moving ahead in love and in all phases of life."

The unique wah-wah clavinet sound in the song was achieved with a Mu-Tron III envelope filter pedal. The bass line is provided by a Moog synthesizer programmed by co-producers Malcolm Cecil and Robert Margouleff. Using overdubs, Wonder played clavinet, drums and percussion in addition to singing the vocals.

== Critical reception ==
In its contemporary review, Cash Box said the song "is further evidence of [Wonder's] inner genius." Record World called it a "chunky item that has all the feel and finesse of 'Superstition.'"

In 2004, Rolling Stone ranked the song number 261 on its list of the 500 Greatest Songs of All Time, was re-ranked at number 265 in 2010, and re-ranked at number 113 in 2021, adding: "'Higher Ground' was recorded just before Wonder was involved in a near-fatal accident in August 1973 that left him in a coma. Early in Wonder's recovery, his road manager sang the song's melody into the singer's ear; Wonder responded by moving his fingers with the music."

On August 21, 2024, Wonder performed "Higher Ground" at the 2024 Democratic National Convention in support of Vice President Kamala Harris and her campaign to become the next President of the United States in the 2024 United States presidential election.

== Charts ==
=== Weekly charts ===
Chart (1973)	Peak position
Australia (Kent Music Report)	62
Canada (RPM 100 Singles)	9
Canada (RPM Pop Music Playlist)	73
France (IFOP)	16
Netherlands (Dutch Top 40)	33
Netherlands (Single Top 100)	28
UK Singles (Official Charts)	29
US Billboard Hot 100	4
US Hot R&B Singles (Billboard)	1

=== Year-end charts ===
Chart (1973)	Rank
US Billboard Hot 100	62

== Certifications ==
Region	Certification	Certified units/sales
New Zealand (RMNZ)	Gold	15,000^{‡}
United Kingdom (BPI)	Silver	200,000^{‡}
^{‡} Sales+streaming figures based on certification alone.

== Red Hot Chili Peppers version ==
"Higher Ground"

Single by Red Hot Chili Peppers

from the album Mother's Milk
- B-side: "Millionaires Against Hunger"
- Released: April 10, 1989
- Recorded: 1988
- Genre: Funk metal
- Length: 3:21
- Label: EMI America
- Songwriter: Stevie Wonder
- Producer: Michael Beinhorn

Red Hot Chili Peppers singles chronology
"Fight Like a Brave" (1987)	"Higher Ground" (1989)	"Knock Me Down" (1989)

Music video
- "Higher Ground" on YouTube

American rock band Red Hot Chili Peppers released a cover in 1989, as the first single from their fourth album Mother's Milk. In 2000, British magazine Total Guitar named it the second greatest cover ever.

It has been featured in films, TV shows and video games, including Mighty Morphin Power Rangers: The Movie, Beavis and Butthead, Center Stage, The Fresh Prince of Bel-Air, Walking Tall, The Longest Yard, The Karate Kid, Ty The Tasmanian Tiger, The Change-Up, Rocksmith and Guitar Hero Live.

A remixed version by the X-Ecutioners was featured in the video game SSX 3 while a cover version appeared in Guitar Hero. FX used the song to promote The Ultimate Fighter: Live and it also serves as the show's theme song.

As part of the "Year of a Million Dreams" Celebration, Space Mountain at Disneyland in Anaheim, California was transformed into Rockin' Space Mountain. The song was used as its soundtrack for 16 weeks, from January 3, 2007, to April 26, 2007.

Red Hot Chili Peppers performed the song with other musicians as part of the all-star jam during the band's induction into the 2012 Rock and Roll Hall of Fame Induction Ceremony.

=== Music video ===
The video for this version was directed by Drew Carolan and Bill Stobaugh, and was nominated for Breakthrough Video at the 1990 MTV Video Music Awards.

=== Track listing ===
US Cassette single (1989)

1. "Higher Ground"
2. "Nobody Weird Like Me"

7" single (1989)

1. "Higher Ground"
2. "Fight Like a Brave"

UK CD single

1. "Higher Ground"
2. "Higher Ground" (Munchkin Mix)
3. "Millionaires Against Hunger"
4. "Mommy Where's Daddy?"

12" UK promo (1989)

1. "Higher Ground"
2. "Higher Ground" (Munchkin Mix)
3. "Higher Ground" (Bert Bevans Remix)

12" US promo (1989)

1. "Higher Ground" (12" Vocal)
2. "Higher Ground" (Politician Mix)
3. "Higher Ground" (Dub Mix)

Australian 7" single (1989) [US-2346] EMI USA

1. "Higher Ground" - 3:12
2. "Punk Rock Classic" - 1:37

UK 7" single (1989)

1. "Higher Ground"
2. "Millionaires Against Hunger"

UK 12" 3D Punch Out Pepper single (1990)

1. "Higher Ground"
2. "Higher Ground" (Munchkin Mix)
3. "Politician" (Mini Rap)
4. "Higher Ground" (Bert Bevans Mix)

UK 12" gatefold sleeve pop up single (1990)

1. "Higher Ground"
2. "Fight Like a Brave"
3. "Out in L.A."

UK 12" limited edition picture disc single (1990)

1. "Higher Ground"
2. "Higher Ground" (Daddy-O Mix)
3. "Fight Like a Brave"

UK CD Reissue-single (1990) [#CDMT-88] EMI USA

1. "Higher Ground" (album) - 3:22
2. "Fight Like a Brave" (album) - 3:47
3. "Behind the Sun" (album) - 4:40
4. "Out in L.A." (album) - 1:58

France CD promo single (1992) [#SPCD1608] EMI France

1. "Higher Ground" (Daddy-O Mix) - 5:15
2. "Millionaires Against Hunger" - 3:11
3. "Castles" (Live) - 3:17

=== Personnel ===
Personnel taken from Mother's Milk CD booklet.

Red Hot Chili Peppers

- Anthony Kiedis – lead vocals
- John Frusciante – guitar
- Flea – bass
- Chad Smith – drums

Additional personnel

- Vicki Calhoun – backing vocals
- Wag – backing vocals
- Randy Ruff – backing vocals
- Aklia Chinn – backing vocals
- Jack Sherman – backing vocals
- Joel Virgel Viergel – backing vocals
- Iris Parker – backing vocals
- Julie Ritter – backing vocals
- Gretchen Seager – backing vocals
- Laure Spinosa – backing vocals
- Sir Babs – backing vocals
- Merill Ward – backing vocals
- Bruno Deron – backing vocals
- Kristen Vigard – backing vocals

=== Charts ===
Chart (1989–1990)	Peak position
Australia (ARIA)	45
Netherlands (Single Top 100)	38
New Zealand (Recorded Music NZ)	15
UK Singles (Official Charts)	55
US Mainstream Rock Airplay (Billboard)	26
US Alternative Airplay (Billboard)	11

== Certifications ==
Region	Certification	Certified units/sales
New Zealand (RMNZ)	Gold	15,000^{‡}
^{‡} Sales+streaming figures based on certification alone.
