= Baldwin Hills (TV series) =

- Genre: Reality
- Directed by: Michael McNamara
- Country of origin: United States
- Original language: English
- No. of seasons: 3
- No. of episodes: 30

Production
- Executive producers: Sheri Maroufkhani; Michael McNamara; Bill Rademaekers; Mark Brown
- Producer: Murithi Mike Marangu
- Cinematography: Chris Mosio
- Editors: Martin Aristidou; Diana Fishman; Joe LaMattina; Erika K. Rupp; Mike Wurzlebacher
- Running time: 20–22 min
- Production company: C4 Pictures

Original release
- Network: BET
- Release: July 10, 2007 – March 17, 2009

Baldwin Hills is an American reality television series featuring African-American teenagers from the Baldwin Hills neighborhood of Los Angeles, California. The series aired on BET from July 2007 to March 2009.

== Overview ==
Baldwin Hills features the lives of wealthy African American teens growing up in the Los Angeles neighborhood Baldwin Hills, sometimes referred to as the "Black Beverly Hills". Baldwin Hills gives BET's primarily black audience an alternative to MTV's Laguna Beach. The shows first season focused mainly on Moriah and his relationship with Gerren, it also focuses on Jordan trying to get his career in the promoting industry up and running.

== Cast ==
=== Main ===
	Season 1	Season 2	Season 3
Ashley Calloway	✓	✓	
Moriah Johnson	✓	✓	✓
Gerren Taylor	✓	✓	✓
Gaven	✓		
Jordan	✓		
Rocqui	✓	✓	
Sal	✓	✓	
Staci	✓	✓	✓
Willie	✓		
Seiko		✓	✓
Johnathan Franklin		✓	
Justin		✓	✓
Lo'Rena		✓	
Etienne			✓
Trason			✓
Tyler			✓

=== Recurring ===
	Season 1	Season 2	Season 3
Daymeon	✓		
Garnette	✓		
Makensy	✓		
Tee'Nee	✓	✓	
Aunjel		✓	✓
La La		✓	
Aysia			✓
Jojo			✓
Kenny			✓

== Episodes ==
Season	Episodes	Originally released	
Season	Episodes	First released	Last released
1	10	July 10, 2007	August 28, 2007
2	10	June 24, 2008	August 19, 2008
3	10	January 27, 2009	March 17, 2009

=== Season 1 (2007) ===
No.	Title	Original release date	Prod. code
1	"Life! No Limits"	July 10, 2007	101
2	"Party Aftermath"	July 10, 2007	102
3	"We Wanna Know"	July 17, 2007	103
4	"Beach Party Fiasco"	July 24, 2007	104
5	"Date Night Drama"	July 31, 2007	105
6	"Don't Call Me"	August 7, 2007	106
7	"Setting Things Straight"	August 14, 2007	107
8	"Prom Night Tears"	August 21, 2007	108
9	"Steppin' It Up"	August 28, 2007	109
10	"Road to Success"	August 28, 2007	110

=== Season 2 (2008) ===
No.	Title	Original release date	Prod. code
1	"The Pop Off"	June 24, 2008	201
2	"Test of Will"	July 8, 2008	202
3	"Going at It!"	July 15, 2008	203
4	"Big Shots"	July 22, 2008	204
5	"Fashion Flair"	July 29, 2008	205
6	"It's Like That!"	July 29, 2008	206
7	"Decisions, Decisions"	August 5, 2008	207
8	"Famous Aunties"	August 12, 2008	208
9	"The Glamorous Life"	August 19, 2008	209
10	"Separate Ways"	August 19, 2008	210

=== Season 3 (2009) ===
No.	Title	Original release date	Prod. code
1	"Turning Points"	January 27, 2009	301
2	"Lets Talk..."	January 27, 2009	302
3	"Put Your Game On"	February 3, 2009	303
4	"Oh, That's Awkward"	February 10, 2009	304
5	"Keeping Their Cool"	February 17, 2009	305
6	"Tough Questions"	February 24, 2009	306
7	"The Grill"	March 3, 2009	307
8	"Vegas Dreaming"	March 10, 2009	308
9	"Just Friends?"	March 17, 2009	309
10	"Facing The Truth"	March 17, 2009	310
