= Knock Me Down =

Single by Red Hot Chili Peppers

from the album Mother's Milk
- B-side: "Millionaires Against Hunger"
- Released: August 22, 1989
- Genre: Funk metal
- Length: 3:43; 4:44 (original long version)
- Label: EMI; Capitol
- Songwriters: Flea; John Frusciante; Anthony Kiedis; Chad Smith
- Producers: Michael Beinhorn; George Clinton (on "Millionaires Against Hunger")

Red Hot Chili Peppers singles chronology
"Higher Ground" (1989)	"Knock Me Down" (1989)	"Taste the Pain" (1989)

Music video
- "Knock Me Down" on YouTube

"Knock Me Down" is a song by American rock band Red Hot Chili Peppers from their fourth studio album, Mother's Milk (1989). The track, released on August 22, 1989, was the album's second single and depicts negativity towards the stereotypical egotistic lifestyle of a typical rock star and was considered to be disavowing of drugs. "Knock Me Down" peaked at number six on the Billboard Modern Rock Tracks.

== Recording ==
The band recorded basic tracks during March and early April 1989 at Hully Gully studios in Silver Lake. "Knock Me Down" originated during these sessions, and was formed from jam sessions without any input from returning producer Michael Beinhorn. According to Flea, the Hully Gully sessions bore fruit: "We played hard and fast more than at any other time in our career, I think. A lot of chops were going down ... we played constantly, got to know each other, and came up with a record." Kiedis and Flea recognized that Frusciante's presence had become a significant influence on the band's new material as the Hully Gully sessions were proving to be extremely productive; Flea recalled that "Frusciante was an immense new element to the sound of our band and a big opening up for us."

== Composition ==
In 1988, former guitarist Hillel Slovak died of a heroin overdose. The song serves as a tribute to Slovak; according to Kiedis, "It was a song that described what it was like to be a drug addict, to have that ego and to think you were impenetrable and impervious to the forces of nature and life. But it was also a love song for Hillel."

"Knock Me Down" became one of the most radical shifts in style for the band. The introspective lyrics, which analyze the death of Slovak and the devastating effect drugs can have, were a new approach for Kiedis, who primarily wrote of sexual intercourse and a hedonistic lifestyle. The vocalist did not, however, want the track to be associated with "anti-drug" sentiments, claiming, "[the song] is about letting your friends know that you need help and then being willing to accept the help of others when you need it, whether it's from drugs or a number of other personal problems." According to music journalist Jeff Apter, the song "Knock Me Down" was "clearly the most important track the band had ever laid down; it proved that these Peppers were more than knuckleheads with socks hanging off their cocks." Musically, the track integrates the Chili Peppers' typical punk influences, but asserts heavier emphasis on melody and harmonics that lead into more alternative territory.

"Knock Me Down" was originally recorded to be a duet between vocalist Anthony Kiedis and guitarist John Frusciante, but the song was remixed before being released as a single; the new mix accidentally highlighted the guitarist's voice instead of Kiedis'. The original, longer version of this song is featured on the bonus Mother's Milk CD, which contains additional verses and an extended bridge. In this version, Kiedis' vocals are mixed to appear more prominent.

== Music video ==
The video featured actor Alex Winter, and was directed by Drew Carolan, who also directed the video for "Higher Ground".

== Track listing ==
CD promo single (1989)

1. "Knock Me Down" – 3:44
2. "Millionaires Against Hunger" (Previously Unreleased) – 3:28
3. "Fire" – 2:03
4. "Punk Rock Classic" – 1:47

CD single version 1 and 12" single (1989)

1. "Knock Me Down" – 3:44
2. "Punk Rock Classic" – 1:47
3. "Magic Johnson" – 2:57
4. "Special Secret Song Inside" – 3:16

7" single/Picture disc (1989)

1. "Knock Me Down" – 3:44
2. "Punk Rock Classic" – 1:47
3. "Pretty Little Ditty" – 1:37

7" version 2 (1989)

1. "Knock Me Down" – 3:44
2. "Punk Rock Classic" – 1:47
3. "Pretty Little Ditty" – 1:37

7" version 3 (1989)

1. "Knock Me Down" – 3:44
2. "Punk Rock Classic" – 1:47
3. "Magic Johnson" – 2:57
4. "Special Secret Song Inside" – 3:16

12" single (1989)

1. "Knock Me Down" – 3:44
2. "Millionaires Against Hunger" (Previously Unreleased) – 3:28
3. "Fire" – 2:03
4. "Punk Rock Classic" – 1:47

CD single version 2 (1989)

1. "Knock Me Down" – 3:44
2. "Magic Johnson" – 2:57
3. "Punk Rock Classic" – 1:47
4. "Jungle Man" – 4:08

7" Australian single (1989)

1. "Knock Me Down" – 3:35
2. "Show Me Your Soul" – 4:20

== Personnel ==
Red Hot Chili Peppers

- Anthony Kiedis – lead vocals
- John Frusciante – guitar, lead vocals
- Flea – bass
- Chad Smith – drums, tambourine

Additional personnel

- Vicki Calhoun – backing vocals
