= Anthony Kiedis =

American singer (born 1962)

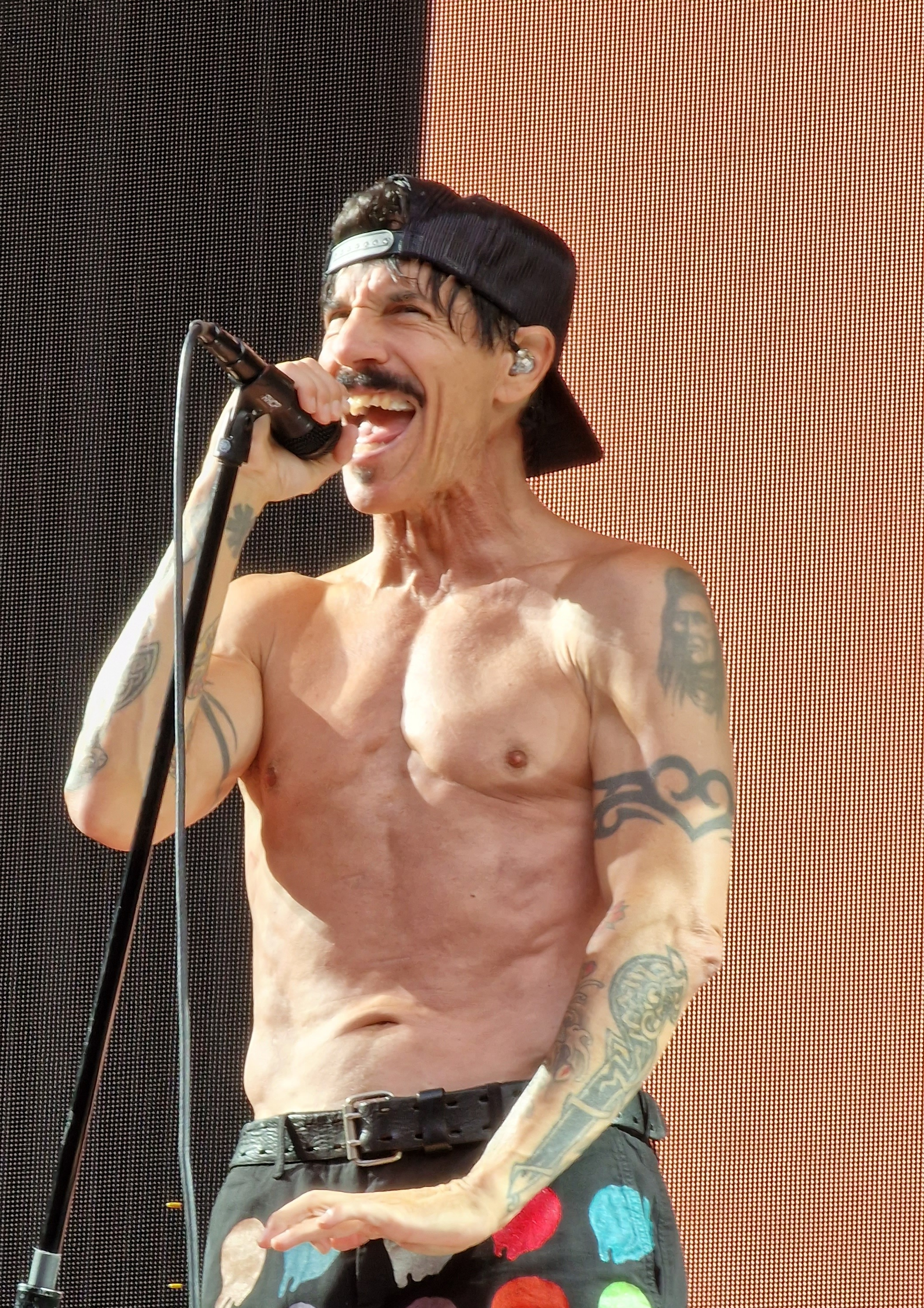
- Kiedis performing in 2022
- Born: November 1, 1962 (age 64); Grand Rapids, Michigan, U.S.
- Other names: Tony; Cole Dammett; Tony Flow; The Rainy Lithuanian; Antoine the Swan
- Occupations: Singer; rapper; songwriter
- Years active: 1983–present
- Partner: Heather Christie (2005–2008)
- Children: 1
- Awards: Full list
- Musical career
- Genres: Funk rock; alternative rock; funk metal; rap rock; hard rock
- Instrument: Vocals
- Member of: Red Hot Chili Peppers

Anthony Kiedis (/ˈkiːdɪs/ KEE-dis; born November 1, 1962) is an American musician who is the lead vocalist of the rock band Red Hot Chili Peppers. He and his fellow band members were inducted into the Rock and Roll Hall of Fame in 2012.

Kiedis spent his youth in Grand Rapids, Michigan, with his mother, and then moved shortly before his twelfth birthday to live with his father in Hollywood. While attending Fairfax High School, Kiedis befriended students Flea and Hillel Slovak, who were members of the band Anthym. After high school, Kiedis took classes at UCLA, but dropped out in his second year.

When Kiedis received an offer to be the opening act for a local band, he enlisted Flea, Slovak, and drummer Jack Irons. After a show under the name Tony Flow and the Miraculously Majestic Masters of Mayhem, the band progressed and the lineup eventually became the Red Hot Chili Peppers. He has recorded thirteen studio albums with the Red Hot Chili Peppers.

Kiedis's lyrical style has evolved throughout his career; early recordings discussed topics such as sex and life in Los Angeles, while more recent songs focus on more reflective themes including love, addiction, and loss. He struggled with addiction until 2000, and maintains that he has been clean since then.

== Early life and education ==
Kiedis was born in Grand Rapids, Michigan, on November 1, 1962, to Margaret "Peggy" Nobel and struggling actor John Michael Kiedis, known professionally as Blackie Dammett. His paternal grandfather's family emigrated from Lithuania in the early 1900s. In 2004, Kiedis wrote that his paternal grandmother, Molly VanderVeen, "was a pastiche of English, Irish, French, and Dutch (and, as we’ve recently discovered, some Mohican blood, which explains my interest in Native American culture and identification with Mother Earth)". In 1966, when Kiedis was three years old, his parents divorced, and he was raised by his mother in Grand Rapids. His mother later remarried and had two more children. Each summer, Kiedis would visit his father in Hollywood, California, for two weeks, where the two would bond. Kiedis idolized his father, recalling: "Those trips to California were the happiest, most carefree, the-world-is-a-beautiful-oyster times I'd ever experienced." In 1974, when Kiedis was 12, he moved to Hollywood to live with his father full-time.

Kiedis's father sold drugs, and the two often used marijuana and cocaine together. At age 18, Kiedis accidentally tried heroin for the first time, mistaking it for cocaine. Through his father, Kiedis landed his first acting role, appearing as Sylvester Stallone's character's son in the 1978 film, F.I.S.T. He landed two more acting jobs, in an ABC Afterschool Special and an appearance in the film Jokes My Folks Never Told Me.

Kiedis attended Fairfax High School in Los Angeles, where he struggled to find friends, but he met his future bandmate Flea. The two had a brief confrontation, but then became best friends and bonded while sitting next to each other in driver's education class. Kiedis recalled, "We were drawn to each other by the forces of mischief and love and we became virtually inseparable. We were both social outcasts. We found each other and it turned out to be the longest-lasting friendship of my life." Kiedis became a significant influence on Flea, exposing him to rock music, particularly punk rock. At age 15, while Kiedis and Flea were jumping from a building into a swimming pool, Kiedis missed the pool and broke his back, but recovered.

At age 16, Kiedis met future bandmate Hillel Slovak after seeing him perform with his band Anthym. After the show, Slovak invited Kiedis to his house for a snack. Kiedis later described the experience, "Within a few minutes of hanging out with Hillel, I sensed that he was absolutely different from most of the people I'd spent time with ... He understood a lot about music, he was a great visual artist, and he had a sense of self and a calm about him that were just riveting." Slovak, Kiedis, and Flea often used LSD, heroin, cocaine, and speed recreationally. Kiedis excelled in school, often receiving straight-A grades. In June 1980, Kiedis graduated with honors from high school. That August, he enrolled at the University of California, Los Angeles to study writing.

== Career ==
=== 1983–1984: Formation and first album ===
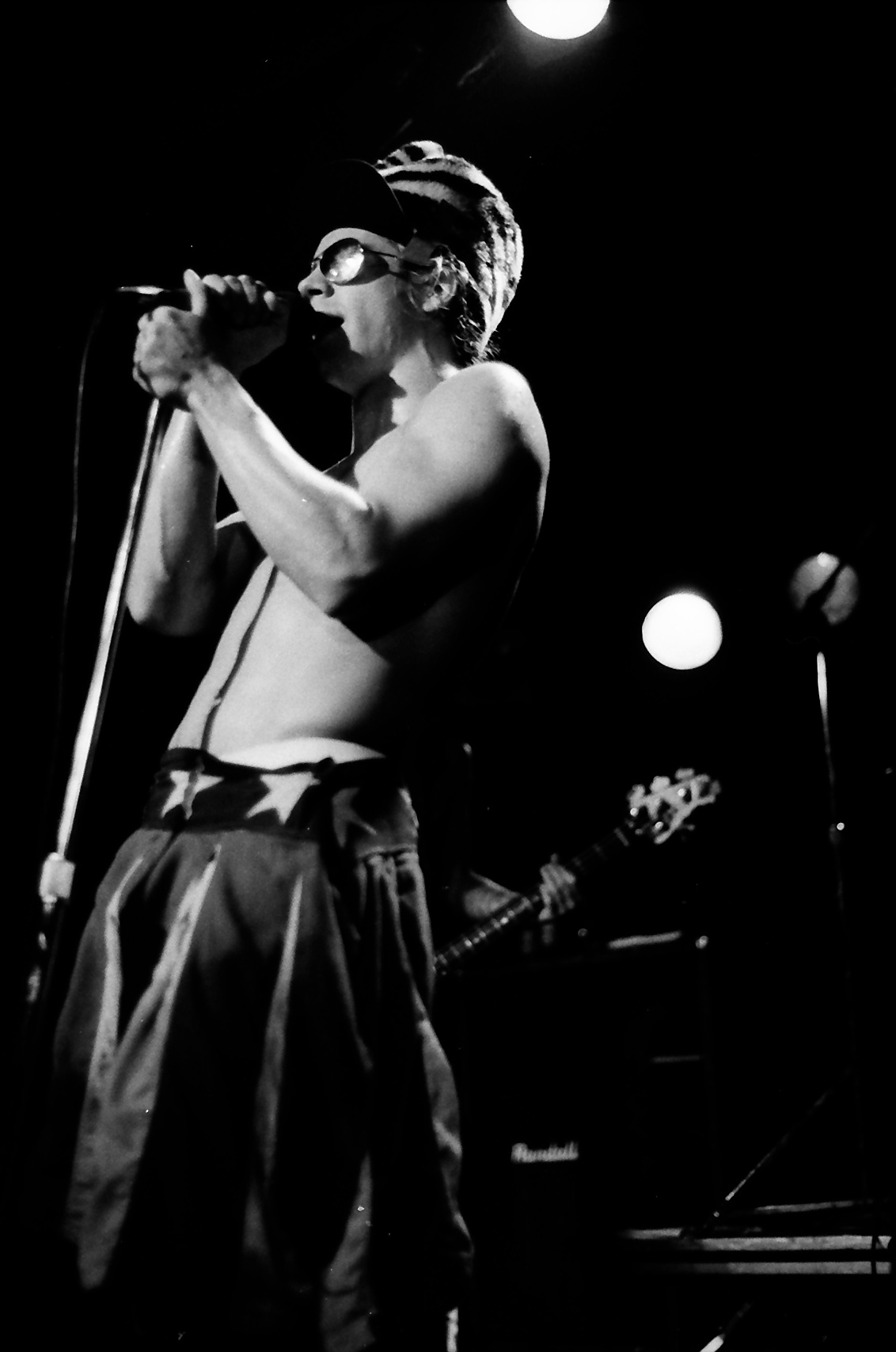
Kiedis performing with the Red Hot Chili Peppers in Philadelphia in November 1985

Kiedis began working with Flea and drummer Jack Irons, where he was described as a "manic master of ceremonies" before he even began singing for the group. Irons and Slovak began playing together in a high school band called Chain Reaction. The group included then bassist Tom Strasman and Chile-born vocalist and guitarist Alain Johannes. Strasman was intent on becoming a lawyer, and quit the band to focus on college. Flea soon offered Kiedis a position in the band. Kiedis began as a hype man, going out in front of the band and getting the audience pumped up.

Kiedis, Slovak, and Flea began to create their own music after finding inspiration in a punk-funk fusion band called Defunkt. Kiedis rejected the violence and misogyny of the Los Angeles punk rock scene, and wanted to create a more peaceful environment to encourage women to come to concerts. The three reunited with Irons, who had recently left his previous band Anthym, to form a new band called Tony Flow and the Miraculously Majestic Masters of Mayhem. The band had only one song, titled "Out in L.A.", and was formed for the purpose of playing the song once. The song was based on a guitar riff that Slovak wrote while jamming with Irons, and was not meant to become a real song until Kiedis decided to rap over the music. Mike Chester, a friend of Kiedis', invited the band to open for his act Mike and Neighbor's Voices at The Rhythm Lounge, as he felt that Kiedis had potential as a frontman. Slovak and Flea felt that Kiedis did not have enough vocal experience, but the two eventually agreed to perform. Kiedis later described the performance: "All the anticipation of the moment hit me, and I instinctively knew that the miracle of manipulating energy and tapping into an infinite source of power and harnessing it in a small space with your friends was what I had been put on this earth to do."

After the group's first show at The Rhythm Lounge, the owner of the bar asked them to return, but with two songs instead of one. After several more shows, and the addition of several songs to their repertoire, the band's name was changed to The Red Hot Chili Peppers. The band's concert repertoire grew to ten songs as a result of months of playing at local nightclubs and bars. At a performance at a strip club in Hollywood called Kit Kat Club, the band members performed wearing only socks on their penises, an idea formed by Kiedis. This gained the band notoriety, and club owners even began booking the group on the condition that they would perform in this manner. The Red Hot Chili Peppers entered Bijou Studios to record a demo tape and subsequently secured a record deal with EMI. Irons and Slovak, however, decided to leave the Red Hot Chili Peppers in order to pursue a "more serious" future with their band Anthym, which by this time had been renamed What Is This? Kiedis ultimately respected the decision, but felt the band would be lost without them. Kiedis and Flea hired drummer Cliff Martinez from The Weirdos and guitarist Jack Sherman to fill Iron's and Slovak's places, respectively. Andy Gill, formerly of Gang of Four, agreed to produce their first album, 1984's The Red Hot Chili Peppers. Gill and Sherman clashed with Kiedis and Flea; they continuously argued over music style, sound, and the album's production. Sherman was fired from the band following the tour and replaced by a returning Slovak.

=== 1985–1988: Freaky Styley, The Uplift Mofo Party Plan, and death of Hillel Slovak ===
Funk musician George Clinton was hired to produce the band's second album, Freaky Styley, as Slovak returned on guitar. The strong chemistry between Clinton and the Chili Peppers was felt instantly. Freaky Styley was released in August 1985. It received only a bit more attention than The Red Hot Chili Peppers with roughly 75,000 copies sold by year's end. The band hired Michael Beinhorn, their last resort among potential producers, to work on their next album. What Is This? had finally disbanded, and Irons returned to the Chili Peppers in mid-1986 after Martinez was fired. Flea, Slovak and Kiedis especially were involved in heavy drug use and their relationships became strained. Flea recalled that "it began to seem ugly to me and not fun; our communication was not healthy". Kiedis became dependent on heroin, leaving Flea and Slovak to work on much of the album's material by themselves. Both Kiedis and Slovak struggled with debilitating heroin addictions, which grew worse as the band was preparing to record The Uplift Mofo Party Plan. Due to his addiction, Kiedis lacked the motivation to contribute to the band musically, and appeared at rehearsal "literally asleep". He was asked to leave the band in order to undergo drug rehabilitation. During that time, the band won the LA Weekly Band of the Year award, which prompted Kiedis to quit using heroin cold turkey. He visited his mother in Michigan for guidance, who drove him to drug rehabilitation immediately after picking him up from the airport upon seeing his unhealthy appearance. Kiedis checked into a Salvation Army rehabilitation clinic in Grand Rapids, Michigan, an experience which he initially detested until he noted that the other people in the clinic were understanding of his struggles and were trying to help him. He moved in with his mother after twenty days at the clinic, a time which marked the first time he was completely abstinent from drugs since he was eleven years old. After Kiedis completed his stint in rehabilitation, he felt a "whole new wave of enthusiasm" due to his sobriety and wrote the lyrics to a new song titled "Fight Like a Brave" on the flight home.

He rejoined the Red Hot Chili Peppers in Los Angeles to record the album. Upon returning home, he began dating actress Ione Skye, whom Flea met while appearing with her in the 1987 science fiction film Stranded. Although Kiedis had recently become clean, his withdrawal symptoms increased and affected his musical contributions to the group. After fifty days of sobriety, Kiedis decided to take drugs again as a one-time attempt to celebrate his new music, which led to his resumed addiction. The recording process for the album became difficult, and Kiedis would often disappear to seek drugs. Producer Michael Beinhorn recalled that, "There were points in pre-production where I really thought the record wasn't gonna get made." Kiedis felt "excruciating pain and guilt and shame" when he would miss a recording session so he would try to write lyrics while searching for drugs; although the band members were upset by his drug use and frequent disappearances, they were impressed with his musical output at the time.

After the international tour in support of Uplift, Slovak died of a heroin overdose in 1988. Following Slovak's death, Kiedis fled to a small fishing village in Mexico and did not attend his funeral, considering the situation to be surreal and dreamlike. Although he found the death to be a shock, he initially was not "scared straight" and continued to use heroin. A few weeks later, his friend convinced him to check into rehab and visit Slovak's grave, which inspired him to get clean. Irons was unable to cope with Slovak's death and subsequently quit the band, saying that he did not want to be part of something that resulted in the death of his friend. Kiedis and Flea decided to continue making music, hoping to continue what Slovak "helped build".

Following Slovak's death, Kiedis and Flea took some time to collect themselves, but decided to keep the band together. Guitarist DeWayne McKnight and drummer D. H. Peligro were added to replace Slovak and Irons. McKnight soon began to create tension within the group, as his style did not mesh with the rest of the band. Peligro, the former drummer of the punk rock band Dead Kennedys, was a friend of John Frusciante, an eighteen-year-old guitarist and avid Red Hot Chili Peppers fan. Peligro introduced Frusciante to Flea, and the three jammed together on several occasions. Kiedis was impressed with Frusciante's skill, and astonished by his knowledge of the Chili Peppers' repertoire. McKnight was fired, and Frusciante accepted an invitation to join the band. The band started writing music for the next album and finished out 1988 with a brief tour. Peligro was fired in November and through auditions, the Chili Peppers brought in drummer Chad Smith as his replacement shortly after.

=== 1989–1993: Mother's Milk and Blood Sugar Sex Magik ===
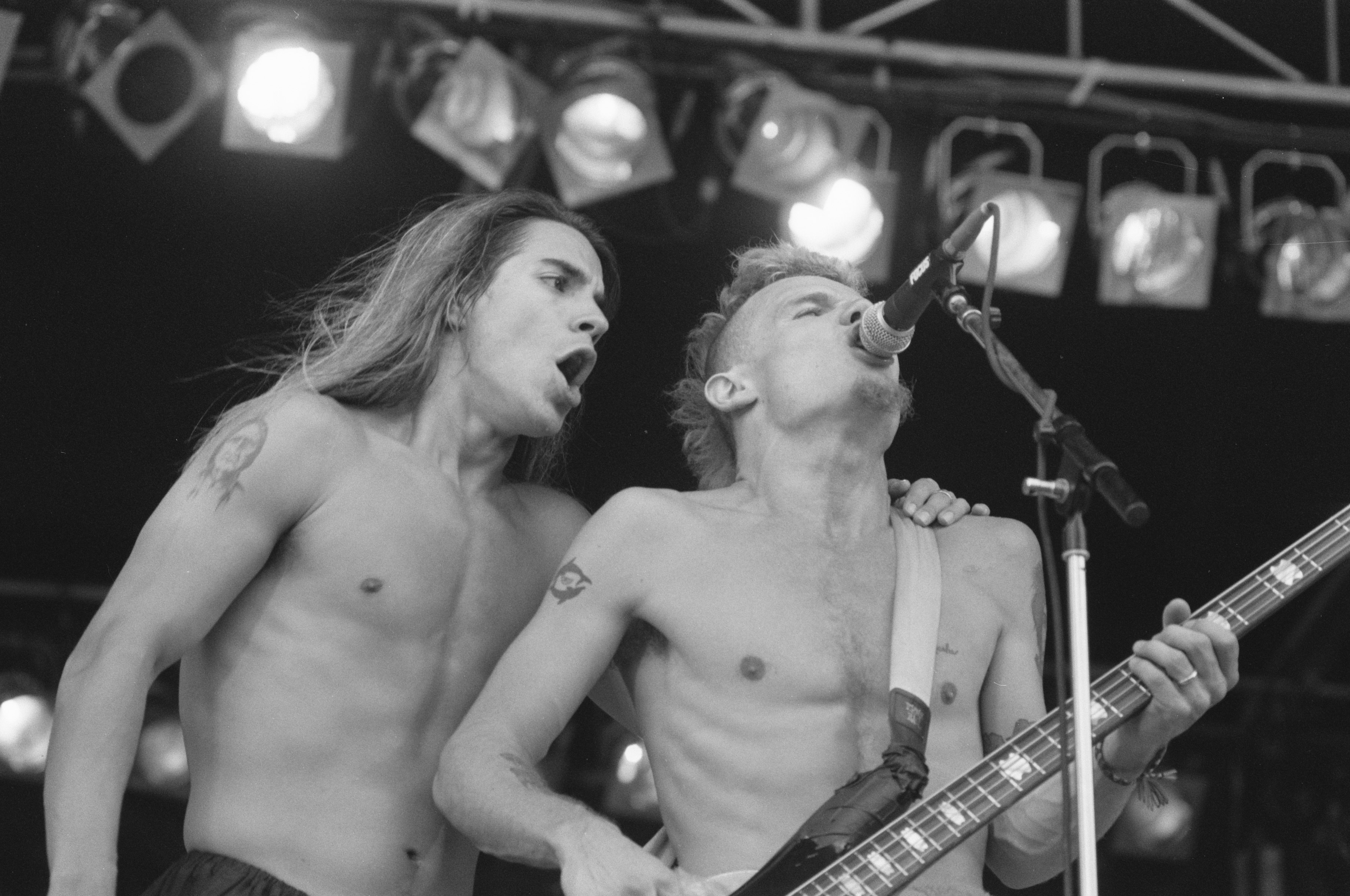
Kiedis and Flea performing in Amsterdam in August 1989

The Chili Peppers entered the studio, and completed recording of their fourth album, Mother's Milk, in early 1989. Upon release, the album was met with mixed reactions from critics, but received far more commercial attention, peaking at number fifty-two on the Billboard 200. Although his band was experiencing greater success, Kiedis' withdrawal symptoms took a toll on his personal life. This led to the end of his two-year relationship with Ione Skye in December 1989: "I had managed to stay sober by not ingesting drugs, so my body had healed from all that torturous activity, but my mind still wasn't healthy enough to work out all the problems that come up in a relationship."

In 1990, Kiedis was convicted for indecent exposure and sexual battery from an incident at George Mason University in Fairfax County, Virginia, in April 1989. He was ordered to pay a fine on both counts. Kiedis touched a woman's face with his penis after a concert at George Mason University in Fairfax County on April 21, 1989.

The band sought to record their next album Blood Sugar Sex Magik in an unconventional setting, believing it would enhance their creative output. The band's producer Rick Rubin suggested the mansion magician Harry Houdini was rumored to have lived in, to which they agreed. A crew was hired to set up a recording studio and other equipment required for production in the house. The band decided that they would remain inside the mansion for the duration of recording, though Smith, convinced the location was haunted, refused to stay. During this stage, Kiedis began to write about anguish, and the self-mutilating thoughts he would experience as a result of his heroin and cocaine addiction. Rubin stumbled upon one of Kiedis's poems that would become the lyrics to "Under the Bridge", and suggested Kiedis show it to the rest of the band. Kiedis was apprehensive because he believed the lyrics to be "too soft" and unlike the band's style. After singing the verse to Frusciante, they began structuring the song the next day. The two worked for several hours arranging chords and melodies until they both agreed it was complete. The song later became a major hit, peaking at number two on the Billboard Hot 100.

When Blood Sugar Sex Magik was released on September 24, 1991, it received an overwhelmingly positive critical response. The album peaked at number three on the Billboard 200, and went on to sell over seven million copies in the U.S. alone. The album's ensuing tour was critically acclaimed—the Chili Peppers commonly performed shows with over twenty thousand in attendance. Up-and-coming bands Nirvana, Pearl Jam, and Smashing Pumpkins also toured with them during their United States tour. The massive attention the Chili Peppers started receiving caused Frusciante to feel extremely uncomfortable, and he abruptly quit the band during the Japanese leg of the album's tour. The band hired guitarist Arik Marshall to complete the remaining tour dates. The band appeared live on the Grammy's ceremony with George Clinton's P-Funk collective and many others, performing a medley that included "Give It Away".

=== 1994–1997: One Hot Minute ===
Months went by, and only small amounts of material were written leading Chad Smith to publicly announce that Kiedis was suffering from writer's block, though Kiedis denied this. The rest of the recording was completed within the next month and their sixth album One Hot Minute was released in September 1995, featuring the band's new guitarist Dave Navarro. The album was met with mixed reviews and was a major departure from the band's funk-punk sound. The tour to support the album was also met with mixed results. Chad Smith broke his arm prior to the launch of the U.S. tour in 1995 so it was delayed until early 1996. Near the tour's end, Kiedis was involved in a motorcycle accident, which left him with a broken arm. The tour ended with the band's final set being cut short due to a massive typhoon. The year 1997 was dubbed "The Year of Nothing" by the band's bassist Flea.

=== 1998–2010: Californication, By the Way, and Stadium Arcadium ===
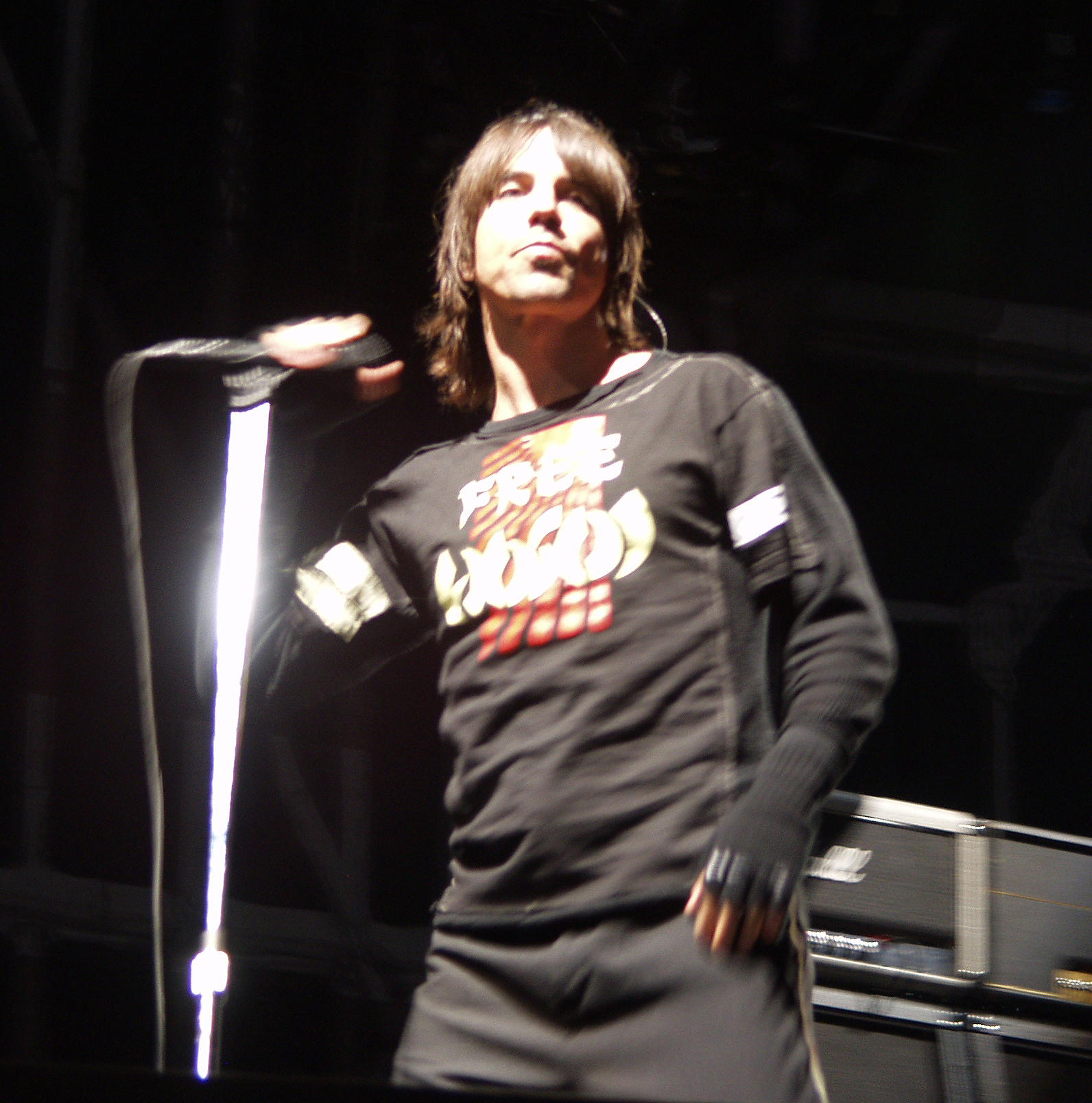
Kiedis performing in 2003

The band regrouped in 1998 to begin writing for their seventh studio album; however, Navarro was now battling his own drug problems. This caused major tension between Kiedis and Navarro, who was fired from the band in early 1998. Flea informed Kiedis that he felt the only way the band could possibly continue is if Frusciante re-joined the band. In the years following Frusciante's departure from the Chili Peppers, he had developed a vicious addiction to both heroin and cocaine that left him in poverty and near death. He was talked into admitting himself to drug rehabilitation in January 1998. In April 1998, following Frusciante's three-month completion, Flea visited his former bandmate and openly invited him to re-join the band, an invitation Frusciante readily accepted. Within the week, and for the first time in six years, the foursome gathered to play and jump-started the newly reunited Red Hot Chili Peppers. The band released Californication on June 8, 1999.

Immediately following the release of Californication, the band embarked on a world tour to support the record, beginning in the United States. To culminate the US leg of their tour, the Chili Peppers were asked to close Woodstock '99, which became infamous for the violence it resulted in. The band was informed minutes before arriving that the crowds and bonfires in the fields had gone out of control. When the Chili Peppers performed a tribute to Jimi Hendrix's song "Fire" to finish their set as a favor to Hendrix's sister, the disruption escalated into violence when several women who had been crowd surfing and moshing were raped and nearby property was looted and destroyed. Kiedis felt that "It was clear that this situation had nothing to do with Woodstock anymore. It wasn't symbolic of peace and love, but of greed and cashing in... We woke up to papers and radio stations vilifying us for playing 'Fire'."

The writing and formation of By the Way began immediately following the culmination of Californication's world tour, in the Spring of 2001. As with Californication, much of the creation took place in the band members' homes, and other locations of practice, such as a recording studio stage. Kiedis recalled of the situation: "We started finding some magic and some music and some riffs and some rhythms and some jams and some grooves, and we added to it and subtracted from it and pushed it around and put melodies to it." Frusciante and Kiedis would collaborate for days straight, discussing guitar progressions and sharing lyrics. For Kiedis, "writing By the Way...was a whole different experience from Californication. John was back to himself and brimming with confidence." The album marked a change in the band's sound, and Kiedis began writing songs reflective of his romantic relationships and drug addictions.

The formation and recording of Stadium Arcadium took place at "The Mansion", the former home of Harry Houdini where the Chili Peppers had recorded their 1991 breakthrough Blood Sugar Sex Magik. Kiedis noted that during the recording process of the album "everybody was in a good mood. There was very little tension, very little anxiety, very little weirdness going on and every day we showed up to this funky room in the Valley, and everyone felt more comfortable than ever bringing in their ideas." The album was released on May 9, 2006.

Following a hugely successful world tour to support Stadium Arcadium, the band decided to take an extended year long break from music in 2008. According to Kiedis, there was a collective decision "not [to] do anything Red Hot Chili Peppers-related for a minimum of one year. [...] We started in 1999, with the writing and the recording of Californication, and we didn't really stop until the tour ended last year. We were all emotionally and mentally zapped at the end of that run." During the break, Frusciante departed amicably with the band in July 2009 (although it wasn't publicly announced until December 2009). Josh Klinghoffer, a touring guitarist for the Chili Peppers and often collaborator with Frusciante was hired as his replacement.

=== 2011–2015: I'm with You and Rock and Roll Hall of Fame induction ===
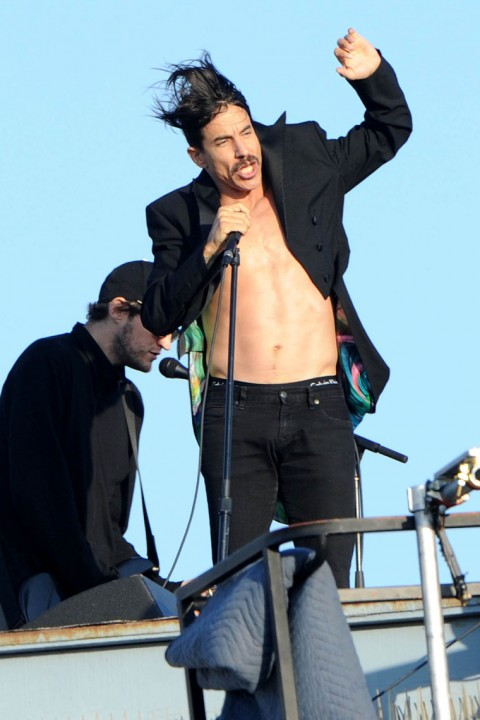
Kiedis in 2011

On August 26, 2011, the Red Hot Chili Peppers released their tenth album, I'm with You. On December 7, 2011, the Red Hot Chili Peppers were named 2012 inductees into the Rock and Roll Hall of Fame. Kiedis said it was very emotional and the first person he told was his father, who cried when hearing the news. On January 11, 2012, the Chili Peppers announced that they were forced to postpone the U.S. leg of their I'm with You tour due to multiple foot injuries suffered by Kiedis. Kiedis has been battling through foot injuries since 2006 when he injured his foot onstage and finally was able to have surgery during a break in the band's tour in January 2012. During the surgery, Kiedis had a crushed sesamoid bone removed and a detached flexor tendon repaired. The band was able to resume their tour and kicked off the U.S. leg on March 29, 2012. The tour in support of I'm with You ended in April 2013 and the band continued touring into mid-2014 which included a halftime performance with Bruno Mars at the Super Bowl in February 2014.

In November 2014, Kiedis set out on a mini-book tour to promote the Chili Peppers book, Fandemonium. This included book signings, a Q&A and an appearance on The Tonight Show with Jimmy Fallon where Kiedis sat in the entire show with The Roots performing Chili Peppers songs.

Kiedis received the George and Ira Gershwin Award for Lifetime Musical Achievement, presented at the UCLA Spring Sing on May 16, 2015. Kiedis' mother, Peggy Noble Idema, commented on her son receiving the award by saying "This really makes me proud. Both my parents and Grandpa Idema were huge Gershwin fans. I grew up with their music." Following his acceptance speech, Kiedis was joined on stage by his Chili Peppers bandmate Josh Klinghoffer for an acoustic performance of "Otherside", a cover of Sly and the Family Stone's "If You Want Me to Stay" and "By the Way".

=== 2016–present: Health scare, The Getaway, Unlimited Love, and Return Of the Dream Canteen ===
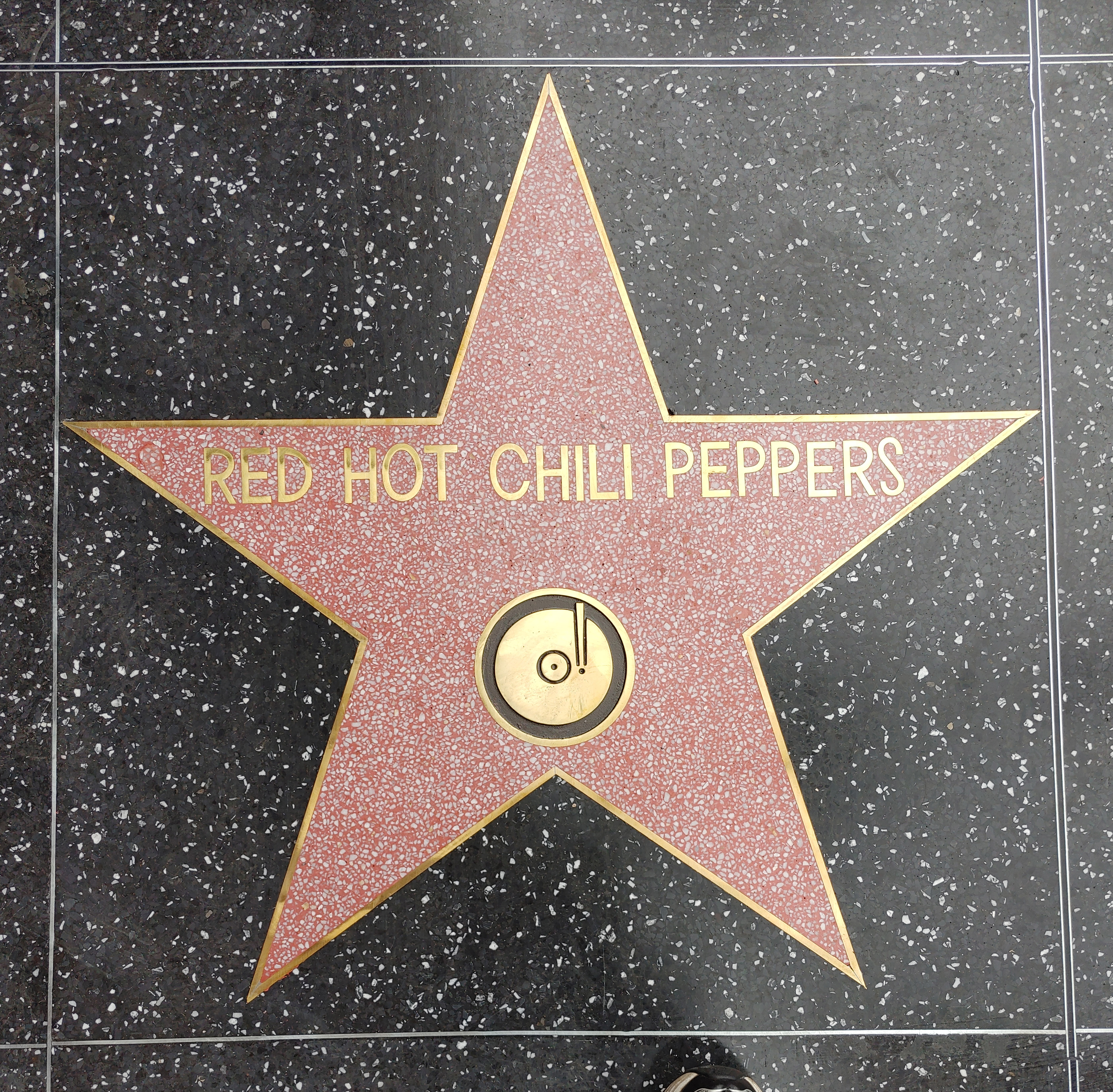
The Hollywood Walk of Fame star for the Red Hot Chili Peppers on Hollywood Boulevard near Amoeba Music

On May 14, 2016, the band were forced to cancel their headlining slot at the annual KROQ Weenie Roast, as Kiedis was rushed to the hospital prior to the band appearing on stage. It was confirmed that Kiedis was suffering from intestinal flu and was expected to make a full recovery; however, the band was forced to postpone their iHeartRadio album preview show on May 17, 2016, which was rescheduled for May 26.

Kiedis and the Chili Peppers returned to the stage on May 22, 2016, in Columbus, Ohio. In a May 20, 2016 interview with Entertainment Tonight Canada, his first since being released from the hospital, Kiedis said that his illness was brought on by an "inflammation in my guts" which he said was complicated by a recent stomach virus and existing scar tissue from previous hernia operations which required his stomach being pumped at the hospital.

During a break in filming of The Late Late Show with James Corden carpool karaoke segment which aired on June 14, 2016, and featured the band singing karaoke to their music with the host while driving through Los Angeles, Kiedis performed emergency CPR on a baby. "A woman came out of her house, holding a child saying, 'My baby, my baby, my baby can't breathe!'" Kiedis said. "The woman thrust the baby into my arms, the baby was not breathing and I thought, 'I'm gonna try and do a little baby CPR real quick, see if I can get some air in this kid. So I started rubbing the belly, bubbles came out of the mouth, the eyes rolled back into place, the ambulance showed up and I handed the baby over, who was now breathing and fine, and we went back to Carpool Karaoke."

The Red Hot Chili Peppers released their eleventh studio album, The Getaway, on June 17, 2016.

On October 20, 2018, Kiedis, who was attending the Los Angeles Lakers game with Flea, was ejected from the game for swearing and giving the middle finger to Chris Paul of the Houston Rockets.

In December 2019, the Red Hot Chili Peppers announced that guitarist John Frusciante would be returning to replace Josh Klinghoffer. As of May 2021, the band had nearly completed their twelfth studio album Unlimited Love and on October 7, 2021, the band announced dates for the Global Stadium Tour beginning in June and concluding in September, later extending the tour to the following February. The tour, in support of the album, featured the band's first ever headlining stadium shows in the U.S. Unlimited Love was released on April 1, 2022.

On December 20, 2021, Kiedis appeared at Dave Navarro and Billy Morrison's third annual Above Ground benefit concert in Los Angeles, where they performed a cover of Lou Reed's "Walk on the Wild Side". This marked the first time Kiedis and Navarro performed together in 24 years since Navarro was fired from the Red Hot Chili Peppers.

On October 14, 2022, The Red Hot Chili Peppers released their thirteenth studio album, Return of the Dream Canteen.

On May 16, 2025, it was reported by Deadline that a documentary on the band's formative years was being secretly screened at the Cannes Film Festival and was looking for select buyers in both New York and Los Angeles. A festival premiere for the film will be planned for either fall 2025 or early 2026. The documentary, which is being co-produced by Hillel Slovak's brother James, will center on the deep childhood bond between Anthony Kiedis, Flea and Hillel Slovak and features various interviews from current and past band members.

As of February 2026, the Chili Peppers are currently in the writing process for their fourteenth studio album. “We’ve been writing music together, recording at John Frusciante’s house, and the music feels great. Ultimately, once we start playing, it’s about… just catching a magic groove and doing it good" Flea said.

== Other projects ==
Using the stage name Cole Dammett (adapted from his father's stage name, Blackie Dammett), Kiedis landed a number of small roles in television and film as a teenager in the late 1970s. His early credits include F.I.S.T. and the 1978 ABC Afterschool Special It's a Mile from Here to Glory. Resuming his acting work in the 1990s, Kiedis played a hooligan surfer named Tone, in the 1991 Keanu Reeves and Patrick Swayze movie Point Break. The Chase, a 1994 movie starring Charlie Sheen as an estranged man trying to escape the cops with a young woman he kidnapped, had Flea and Kiedis playing metalheads who chase Sheen's character in a 4 × 4 truck and end up crashing.

Kiedis also organized the New American Music Union, a two-day summer music festival set for August 2008 in Pittsburgh, Pennsylvania. He assembled a lineup of musicians including Bob Dylan, The Raconteurs, Gnarls Barkley, The Roots, and a second stage featuring college bands. (The lineup did not include Kiedis or the Red Hot Chili Peppers.) In 2011, Kiedis, along with his son Everly, appeared in the documentary, Bob and the Monster. The documentary details the life and career of musician and drug counselor, Bob Forrest. On May 11, 2011, Anthony donated a MTV European Music Award that the band had previously won to help raise funds for ongoing relief in devastated areas of Japan, which was hit with an earthquake and tsunami in March 2011.

Kiedis and Flea were executive producers of the 2014 film Low Down, which is based on the life of jazz pianist Joe Albany.

In June 2015, Kiedis and his son Everly Bear, along with Cher and Willow Smith, were revealed to be the "new faces" of Marc Jacobs Fall 2015 ad campaign.

In February 2016, the Chili Peppers performed at the "Feel the Bern" fundraiser in support of Bernie Sanders.

On January 11, 2019, Kiedis co-authored a Rolling Stone opinion piece with Rory Kennedy, a filmmaker and daughter of Robert F. Kennedy, and the Malibu Foundation's Trevor Neilson in which he listed the human, financial and environmental cost of global climate conditions. Kiedis said "since our federal government is failing us, we must rely on our state and local governments to lead the charge." Three days later, Kiedis and the Chili Peppers performed at a benefit for the victims of the Woolsey Fire in California. The fires destroyed over 1,500 homes, killed four people and also forced Kiedis, his family and band members to evacuate their homes as well. The recording of the band's twelfth album was also put on hold due to the deadly fires. Drummer Chad Smith said "myself and Anthony both live in Point Dume. Seventy houses in our neighborhood burned down. Ours was spared, luckily."

On April 5, 2023, it was announced that Kiedis along with Bob Forrest and Ron Burkle had formed the production company Said and Done Entertainment. Their first project will be an animated series for TBS called Hellicious which is based on the comic book of the same name. Kiedis will voice one of the main characters Briggy Bundy and will also serve as the executive producer for the series.

On May 12, 2025, it was announced that Kiedis and longtime friend Shane Powers founded the ready-to-drink coffee company "JOLENE". The name is in reference to the phrase "cup of joe" and also was inspired by the Dolly Parton song "Jolene". The coffee is available online for nationwide shipping, at select retailers in Los Angeles and New York City, and at live music venues and festivals in partnership with Live Nation.

== Artistry ==
=== Musical style ===
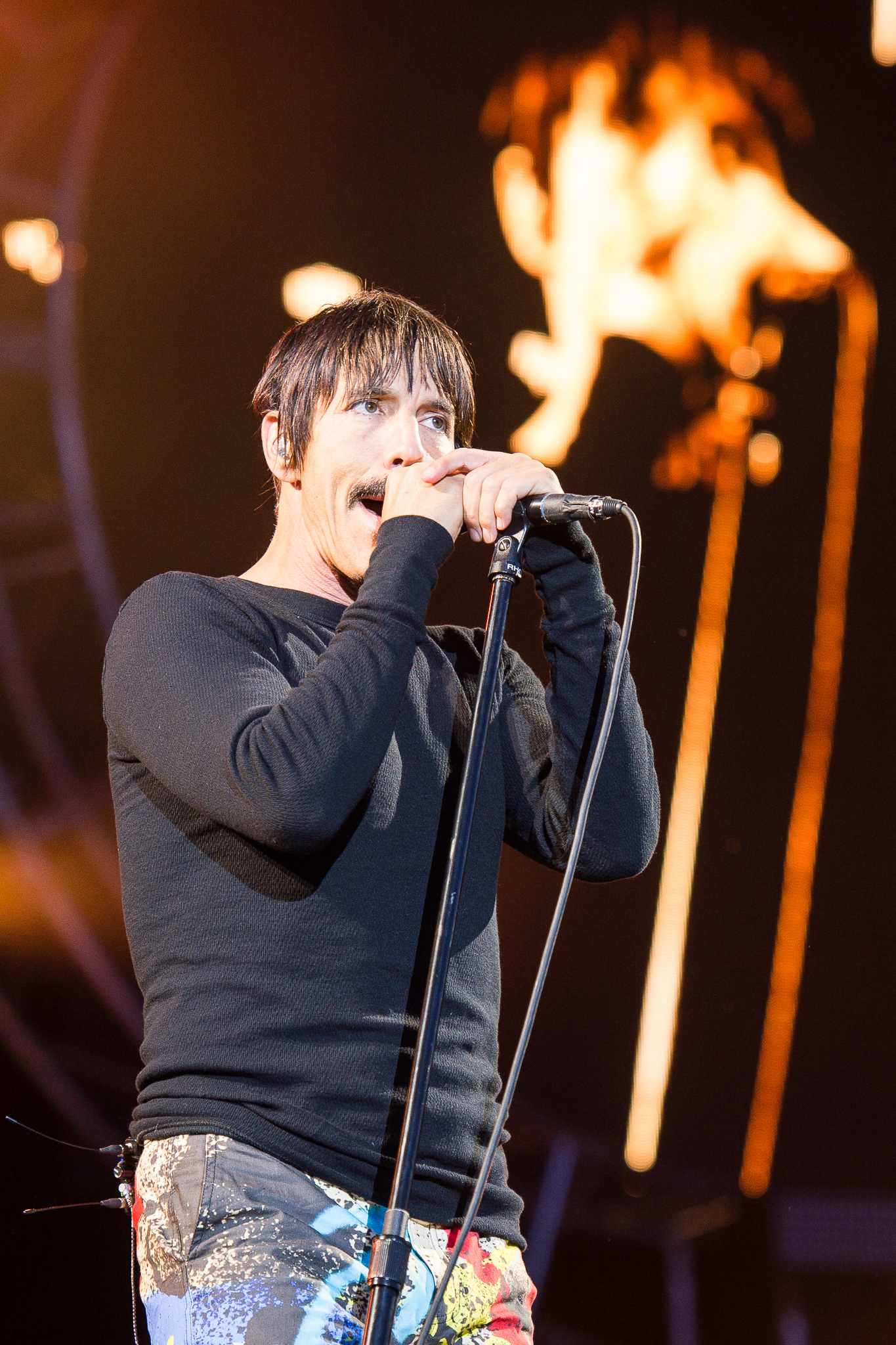
Kiedis performing at Rock am Ring and Rock im Park in Germany in 2016

While creating lyrics and melodies for the Red Hot Chili Peppers, Kiedis has drawn from various sources for inspiration. His first musical memory was hearing Neil Young's "Heart of Gold" at age eleven: "It moved me so much that I insisted my mother buy me the 45." In high school, he was highly influenced by the rap-style vocals of Grandmaster Flash and the Furious Five's "The Message" and the "in-your-face sexual lyrics" of Prince's "Dirty Mind". Kiedis writes most of the Red Hot Chili Peppers' lyrics. Starting with 1989's Mother's Milk album, John Frusciante and Flea have written nearly all of the music (excluding melodies) for the Red Hot Chili Peppers, while Kiedis adds lyrics and melodies he hears during instrumental jams by his bandmates. Kiedis said in 2006, "Somehow I find songs... in the bigness of what they're doing." His lyrical style has varied over the years. During the band's early years, Kiedis wrote many lyrics detailing his enjoyment of sex, drugs, and life in Los Angeles. As his musical tastes expanded and his outlook on life changed, he began writing songs about a wider spectrum of subjects. His lyrics include many of the same themes as the writings of Charles Bukowski, Kiedis' main literary influence.

His early vocal style with the band primarily consisted of rapping, leading him to be labelled as an influence on the rap rock movement. On Mother's Milk (1989), Kiedis wrote more melody-driven songs, rather than the basic rhythm and beat style of funk. The first song where Kiedis employed his new melodic style was "Knock Me Down". The melody was actually shaped and performed by guitarist John Frusciante. Upon joining the band, Frusciante sang lead vocals on the song along with Kiedis. Blood Sugar Sex Magik in 1991 still saw Kiedis rapping, but he also started singing in songs such as "Under the Bridge", "Breaking the Girl", and "I Could Have Lied". Over the years, Kiedis grew to favor singing over rapping. Kiedis has had many vocal coaches, but none of them had helped him sing "well." In fact, it was not until 1999's Californication that he felt he could take full control of his voice while singing.

=== Scar Tissue ===
On October 6, 2004, Kiedis published a memoir, Scar Tissue, which he co-wrote with author Larry Sloman. The book was originally intended to be a collection of stories of his childhood drug use, but evolved into a complete autobiography. He further explained: "One would just kind of assume that with all the [drug] consumption that my memory would be a bit shoddy. But it's actually pretty lucid, and better than both of my parents', or any of my friends'. My friends tried to recount these same stories, and they were like, 'Wow, I don't ... were we there?'" The book was an international bestseller.

In a June 2016 interview, Kiedis stated that he at first regretted writing Scar Tissue saying "I did regret the book for a while as there was some pain caused—then, I started seeing the long term positive reverberating. People were reading it in hospitals, in prisons and schools, and it was having a positive effect. I realised that the whole point of writing that book wasn't for me, but to show that somebody can go all the way down and come all the way back and have a productive, successful happy interesting life. And so whatever shame, pain or difficulty or discomfort I went through, then it was worth it because I get so many people coming up to me saying their kids had read it and got their act together because of it." Kiedis has stated that due to the subject matter in his book, especially his reflections on his sexual relationships, that he hopes that his family hasn't read his book. "I have asked everyone in my family not to read the book," Kiedis said.

=== Television series and movie ===
Kiedis was developing a series for HBO based on his unconventional upbringing in Los Angeles. The show was expected to be loosely based on much of Kiedis' autobiography. He had partnered with Catapult 360 partners Marc Abrams and Michael Benson to create the series, titled Spider and Son. The series would center on Kiedis's relationship with his father, Blackie Dammett, who sold many drugs and mingled with rock stars on the Sunset Strip, all while aspiring to get into show business. The show was scheduled to premiere in late 2010 at the very earliest.

According to a post by Blackie on his Facebook page, the John Sayles script for the pilot episode was turned over to HBO on May 10, 2010. On October 14, 2011, it was announced that HBO was no longer interested in the series and that FX has picked up the rights to air the series. John Sayles, who wrote a script for the HBO pilot is no longer involved in the project. Entourage producers, Esther Dawson and Mike Chester will still produce the series and Kiedis will also co-produce the series along with Bram Sheldon. It is unknown if the series will still follow the relationship between Kiedis and his father Blackie or if the entire autobiography will be the focus of the series. In 2013, Dammett briefly mentioned the status of the series, which will be based on both Kiedis and Dammett's biographies, but stated that it was "mothballed" with hopes of resuming it once the Chili Peppers concluded their tour that year.

It was announced on January 17, 2024, that Universal Pictures will release a theatrical movie based on Scar Tissue. Kiedis along with Guy Oseary and Brian Grazer will produce the film. On September 27, 2024, The Atlanta Journal-Constitution reported that filming of the movie will begin in Atlanta in early 2025.

== Personal life ==
=== Family and relationships ===
Kiedis's father, Blackie Dammett, was an actor who appeared in over 50 movies and television shows. Dammett also ran the band's fanclub for many years. Dammett's autobiography, Lords of the Sunset Strip, was released on March 31, 2013. Through Dammett, Kiedis also has a much younger half-brother. During the Chili Peppers show of June 25, 2017, in Grand Rapids, Kiedis dedicated "Soul to Squeeze" to his father, who was suffering from dementia. Dammett died on May 12, 2021.

Kiedis acknowledges in his autobiography Scar Tissue that he had sexual relations with a 14-year-old girl when he was 23, before and after learning of her age, in the 1980s. This inspired him to write the song "Catholic School Girls Rule". In the wake of the MeToo movement, Kiedis's actions were criticized by several media outlets, including The Huffington Post.

Kiedis had a relationship with actress Ione Skye in the late 1980s starting when he was 24 and she was 16. Skye split with Kiedis after a few years and eventually married Ad Rock of the Beastie Boys in 1992. Skye, who was 18 in 1989, was supposed to appear as the cover model on the Chili Peppers' 1989 album, Mother's Milk; however, the label felt she looked "too young", so they used a different model. In January 2025, Skye posted the unused photo to her Instagram page saying that "it made me feel a little insecure to shoot it then not have it being used." In Skye's 2025 memoir Say Everything, Skye says that when she was 17 years old, Kiedis got her pregnant and that Kiedis paid for her abortion. "I was taking care of myself now, making a choice that felt good and important for my future. I would not have a baby at 17, with someone who didn't want to be a dad, wouldn't commit to me and had anger issues. Not to mention the heroin." Skye said she was inspired to tell her life story by social media critics who questioned her romance with Kiedis. "These girls on TikTok were saying things like, 'How could my mom let me be with Anthony?' And I sort of clapped back. Not in an aggressive way, but I was like, 'Well, my mom was really upset that I was with a rockstar like Anthony Kiedis.' And I don't know, I kind of started feeling like I was able to tell my side of the story, and I had a lot to tell."

Kiedis claims to have had a brief relationship in 1990 with singer Sinéad O'Connor, who inspired him to write "I Could Have Lied" on 1991's Blood Sugar Sex Magik, though she denied the relationship at the time. He was also in a brief relationship with Spice Girls singer Melanie "Sporty Spice" Chisholm, who inspired "Emit Remmus" from 1999's Californication. His band also covered their song "Wannabe" at a 1997 concert in Japan. Kiedis was in a relationship with fashion designer Yohanna Logan on-and-off from 1998 to 2003. Kiedis had a two year long relationship with Australian model Helena Vestergaard that ended in late 2014; the end of this relationship inspired many of Kiedis's lyrics for The Getaway.

Kiedis was in a relationship with Heather Christie from 2004 to 2008. They had a child born on October 2, 2007. In March 2018, Kiedis and Christie were involved in a custody battle.

In a June 2016 interview, Kiedis spoke about his past relationships, saying that there were years when he had over 100 sexual partners. Kiedis added, "If I saw a pretty girl, I wanted to have her." When asked about marriage and growing old alone, Kiedis responded, "Maybe it is because I never learned to live in a relationship and as silly as it sounds, I do not understand women yet. They remain a mystery. I talked about this yesterday with a friend: Do we focus on finding a person who fits with us, or will we remain single? I am open to both. If the right one comes – wonderful. If not, I accept what the universe has intended for me."

Lush singer/guitarist Miki Berenyi confirmed in several interviews that the second verse of their hit 1996 song "Ladykillers" was about Kiedis.

Since 2026, Kiedis has been in a relationship with sex columnist and podcaster Eileen Kelly, who is more than 30 years younger than he is. In April 2026, Kelly wrote an essay in Vogue titled "My Boyfriend Is Double My Age" about the couple's relationship.

Kiedis is a longtime fan of the Los Angeles Dodgers, the Los Angeles Lakers, the Los Angeles Rams, and formerly the Los Angeles Raiders.

=== Drug addictions ===
Kiedis has battled drug addiction, and has used heroin and cocaine throughout his life. Because his father had more relaxed standards on drugs and experimented with them himself, Kiedis was constantly exposed to drug-using and drug-dealing behavior while growing up. Some of Kiedis's early drug use came from substances he got from his father.

Kiedis used drugs for years, including during the formation of the band. A few years into the band's career, he was briefly fired due to his heavy drug use. At times, it got so bad that he failed to show up to the band's performances. One night, after Kiedis missed a performance to score drugs, the band replaced him with singer Keith Morris.

Kiedis tried to get clean after Red Hot Chili Peppers guitarist Hillel Slovak died of a heroin overdose on June 25, 1988, saying he would never shoot up again. He entered rehab and ended up staying clean for five years, but he relapsed in 1994, causing a major delay in the release of the band's 1995 album, One Hot Minute. Kiedis kept using on and off over the next six years.

Kiedis's last major relapse occurred when a doctor prescribed him Tramadol despite Kiedis specifically asking not to be prescribed opioids. In a person recovering from opioid addiction, access to prescription opioids can sometimes trigger a relapse. He has reportedly avoided another relapse since December 24, 2000. In May 2012, after over 20 years of speculation, Vulture claimed that the location where Kiedis would purchase and use drugs (which inspired "Under the Bridge") is located in MacArthur Park in Los Angeles, California, based on clues taken from his memoir. In 2014, LA Weekly strongly insinuated that the conclusion of the Vulture magazine piece was incorrect.

=== Feud with Mike Patton ===
For over 30 years, Kiedis and Faith No More/Mr. Bungle singer Mike Patton have been involved in an ongoing feud. Prior to the feud, Faith No More (then fronted by Chuck Mosley) and Red Hot Chili Peppers had toured together. However, tensions arose in 1989 when Kiedis accused Patton of imitating his mannerisms and image on stage and during the music video for their biggest hit, "Epic". The two attacked each other in the media throughout 1990, including an interview in which Kiedis claimed; "My drummer [Chad Smith] says he's gonna kidnap [Patton], shave his hair off and cut off one of his feet, just so he'll be forced to find a style of his own".

The relationship was thought to have improved in the ensuing years, with Kiedis and Patton reportedly having friendly encounters with each other during the 1990s. The feud was unexpectedly reignited when Mr. Bungle were scheduled to release their album California on June 8, 1999, but Warner Bros. Records pushed the release back a week so as not to coincide with the Chili Peppers' similarly titled album, Californication. Mr. Bungle then claimed that Kiedis had them removed from a series of summer festivals in Europe. Mr. Bungle's guitarist, Trey Spruance, added that the manager of the Chili Peppers apologized and blamed Kiedis for the removals. In retaliation, Mr. Bungle parodied the Red Hot Chili Peppers in Pontiac, Michigan, on Halloween of 1999. They covered several of the band's songs, with Patton deliberately using incorrect lyrics, such as "Sometimes I feel like a fucking junkie" on "Under the Bridge". In the middle of the concert, bassist Trevor Dunn (dressed as Flea) walked up to guitarist Spruance (dressed as the ghost of Hillel Slovak) and simulated injecting him with heroin. Patton (dressed as Kiedis) interrupted by shouting, "You can't shoot up a ghost". Kiedis responded by having them removed from the 2000 Big Day Out festival in Australia and New Zealand. Kiedis said of the festival shows, "I would not have given two fucks if they played there with us. But after I heard about [the] Halloween show where they mocked us, fuck him and fuck the whole band".

Patton continued to mock Kiedis in the media with his new band Fantômas, calling him a "noodle-dick" in a 2001 television interview. Despite the prior history, Patton would later express his desire to move beyond the feud, claiming he and Kiedis would have a warm embrace if the two ever met in person. Kiedis and the band would exhibit another possible gesture aimed at Patton during a concert in 2014 when the band jokingly teased the Faith No More song "We Care a Lot" during a performance at Barclays Center in Brooklyn. Mr. Bungle guitarist Trey Spruance has also spoken highly of the first two Red Hot Chili Peppers albums during a 2016 interview, citing them as an influence on Mr. Bungle's eventual sound.

Several publications, such as Complex and Phoenix New Times, have since listed the Kiedis-Patton feud as being one of the best beefs in the history of rock. Others have labeled it as a "funk metal feud" and "absurd".

== Discography ==
Red Hot Chili Peppers

- The Red Hot Chili Peppers (1984)
- Freaky Styley (1985)
- The Uplift Mofo Party Plan (1987)
- Mother's Milk (1989)
- Blood Sugar Sex Magik (1991)
- One Hot Minute (1995)
- Californication (1999)
- By the Way (2002)
- Stadium Arcadium (2006)
- I'm with You (2011)
- The Getaway (2016)
- Unlimited Love (2022)
- Return of the Dream Canteen (2022)

== Filmography ==
- F.I.S.T. (1978) as Kevin Kovak (billed as Cole Dammett)
- ABC Afterschool Special (1978, Episode: "It's a Mile from Here to Glory") as Jimmy Plummer (billed as Cole Dammett)
- Jokes My Folks Never Told Me (1978) as Student (billed as Cole Dammett)
- Thrashin' (1986) as himself with Red Hot Chili Peppers, Cliff Martinez, Hillel Slovak performing "Blackeyed Blonde" off their second LP, Freaky Styley
- Tough Guys (1986) as himself with Red Hot Chili Peppers, performing "Set it Straight"
- Point Break (1991) as Tone
- The Chase (1994) as Will
- Hellicious (TBA) as Briggy Bundy (also executive producer)
