= List of Red Hot Chili Peppers band members =

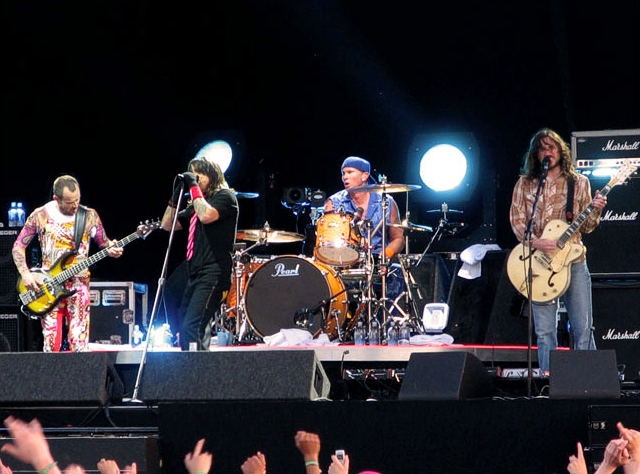
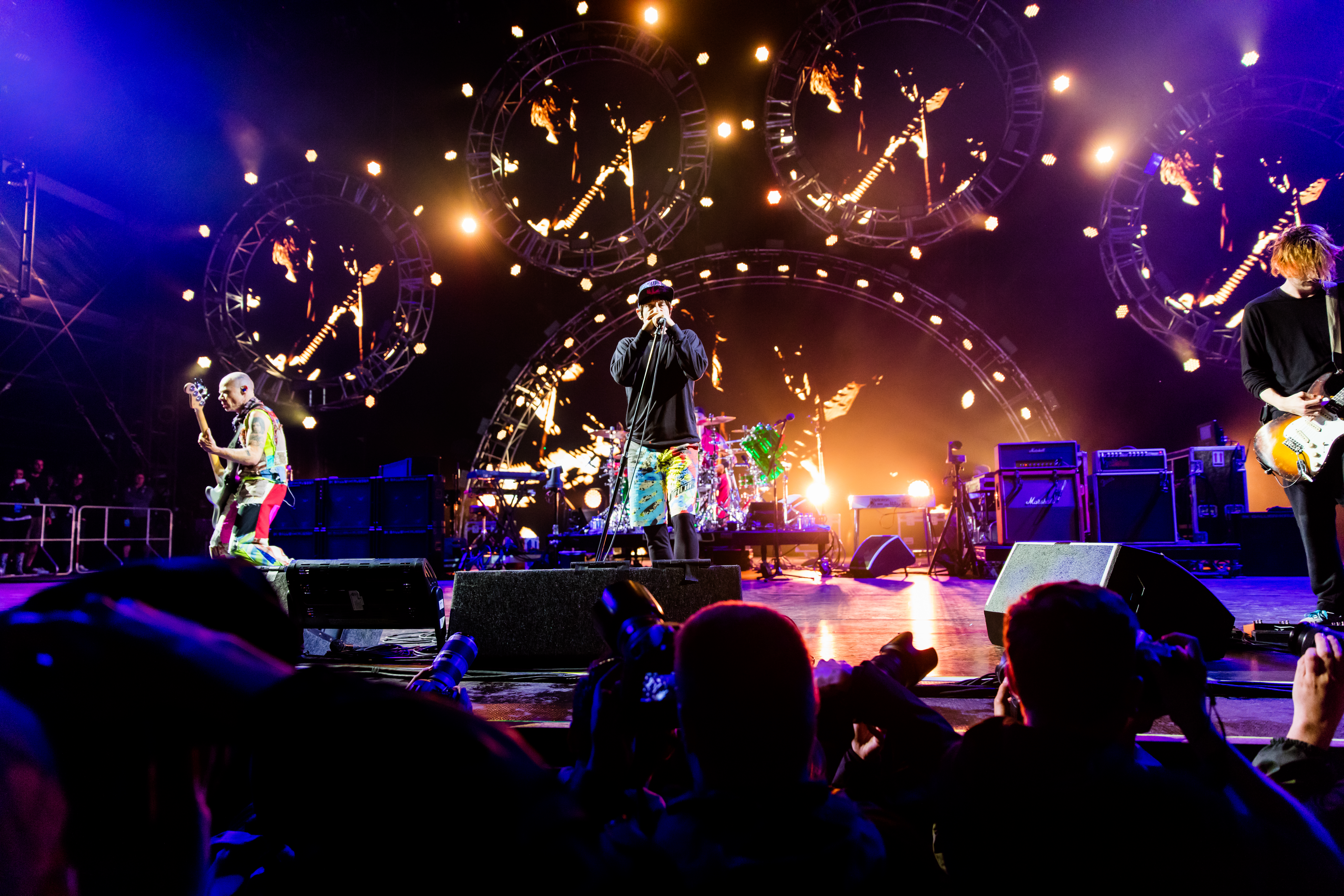
Red Hot Chili Peppers performing in 2006 (top) and 2016 (bottom).

The Red Hot Chili Peppers (RHCP) are an American funk rock band from Los Angeles, California. Formed in December 1982 as Tony Flow and the Miraculously Majestic Masters of Mayhem, the group originally consisted of vocalist Anthony Kiedis, guitarist Hillel Slovak, bassist Flea (real name Michael Balzary) and drummer Jack Irons. The group changed its name to Red Hot Chili Peppers on March 25, 1983. In December, Slovak and Irons both left RHCP, after their other band What Is This obtained a record deal with MCA Records. They were replaced before the end of the year by Jack Sherman and Cliff Martinez, respectively, who performed on the group's self-titled debut album. After the resulting promotional concert tour ended in December 1984, Sherman was fired following tensions with Kiedis and Flea.

Having recently left What Is This?, Slovak returned to RHCP in January 1985. During the tour in promotion of Freaky Styley, Martinez was replaced by the returning Jack Irons, who rejoined in April 1986 to mark the reunion of the group's original lineup. The Uplift Mofo Party Plan was released in 1987. However, after struggling with a heroin addiction for a number of years, Slovak died of an overdose on June 25, 1988, following the conclusion of the album's promotional tour. In the wake of the guitarist's death, Irons decided to leave the group. Kiedis and Flea decided to continue, adding DeWayne McKnight on guitar and D. H. Peligro on drums in August. McKnight was fired the following month and replaced by John Frusciante; Peligro was also dismissed in November, with Chad Smith taking over the following month.

With its new lineup finalised, RHCP released two successful albums in Mother's Milk and Blood Sugar Sex Magik. On May 7, 1992, however, Frusciante abruptly quit the band in the middle of the Blood Sugar Sex Magik Tour, with several shows cancelled as a result. Arik Marshall was brought in for the remainder of the tour, before Jesse Tobias took his place the following September. Before the end of the month, however, former Jane's Addiction guitarist Dave Navarro – the band's first choice to replace Frusciante – had finally agreed to join the group. The band released One Hot Minute in 1995 and toured extensively in promotion of the album. By April 1998, however, Navarro had left RHCP due to creative differences, and his desire to focus on new band Spread. Frusciante returned to the band a few weeks later.

The lineup of RHCP remained constant for more than ten years following Frusciante's return, as the band continued to increase its mainstream success with 1999's Californication, 2002's By the Way and 2006's Stadium Arcadium. After a brief hiatus starting in 2008, however, it was announced in December 2009 that the guitarist had departed for a second time, explaining that "my musical interests have led me in a different direction". Despite the time of the announcement, Frusciante had actually left on July 29, 2009. Josh Klinghoffer, previously a touring guitarist for the band, had taken his place when the band returned from its hiatus in October. The band released I'm with You in 2011 and The Getaway in 2016. On December 15, 2019, the band announced through their Instagram account the departure of Josh Klinghoffer and the subsequent return of John Frusciante as the lead guitarist of the band. This event marked Frusciante's second comeback, in this occasion after 10 years of absence. The band released Unlimited Love and Return of the Dream Canteen in 2022.

== Members ==
=== Current ===
Image	Name	Years active	Instruments	Release contributions
	Flea (Michael Balzary)	1982–present	bass; backing vocals; trumpet; piano; keyboards; occasional lead vocals, guitars and percussion	all Red Hot Chili Peppers (RHCP) releases
	Anthony Kiedis	1982–present	lead vocals; occasional guitars and percussion	all Red Hot Chili Peppers (RHCP) releases
	John Frusciante	1988–1992; 1998–2009; 2019–present	guitars; backing vocals; keyboards; synthesizers; occasional lead vocals, piano, bass and percussion	all RHCP releases from Mother's Milk (1989) to "Soul to Squeeze" (1993), Californication (1999) to Stadium Arcadium (2006), and Unlimited Love (2022) onwards; Rock & Roll Hall of Fame Covers EP (2012); Cardiff, Wales: 6/23/04 (2015)
	Chad Smith	1988–present	drums; percussion	all RHCP releases from Mother's Milk (1989) onwards

=== Former ===
Image	Name	Years active	Instruments	Release contributions
	Hillel Slovak	1982–1983; 1985–1988 (until his death)	guitar; backing and occasional lead vocals; sitar; vocoder	The Red Hot Chili Peppers (1984) – songwriting credits only; all RHCP releases from Freaky Styley (1985) to Mother's Milk (1989); – appears on one track
	Jack Irons	1982–1983; 1986–1988	drums; backing vocals	The Red Hot Chili Peppers (1984) – songwriting credits only; Freaky Styley (1985) – songwriting credits only; all RHCP releases from The Uplift Mofo Party Plan (1986) to Mother's Milk (1989); – appears on one track
	Cliff Martinez	1983–1986	drums	The Red Hot Chili Peppers (1984); Freaky Styley (1985); The Uplift Mofo Party Plan (1987) – songwriting credit only; The Abbey Road E.P. (1988)
	Jack Sherman	1983–1985 (died 2020)	guitar; backing vocals	The Red Hot Chili Peppers (1984); Freaky Styley (1985) – songwriting credits only; The Abbey Road E.P. (1988); Mother's Milk (1989) – guest appearance on two tracks
	DeWayne McKnight	1988	guitar; backing vocals	Out in L.A. (1994) – previously unreleased track "Blues for Meister"
	D. H. Peligro (Darren Henley)	1988 (died 2022)	drums	Mother's Milk (1989) – songwriting credits only; Out in L.A. (1994) – previously unreleased track "Blues for Meister"
	Arik Marshall	1992–1993	guitar; backing vocals	none – Blood Sugar Sex Magik Tour performances only
	Jesse Tobias	1993	guitar; backing vocals	none – rehearsals, writing and demo recording only
	Dave Navarro	1993–1998	guitar; backing vocals	One Hot Minute (1995); "I Found Out" (1995); "Love Rollercoaster" (1996); Rock & Roll Hall of Fame Covers EP (2012)
	Josh Klinghoffer	2009–2019 (touring 2007)	guitar; backing vocals; keyboards; synthesizers; occasional lead vocals, bass, drums, percussion and piano	all RHCP releases from I'm with You (2011) to Live in Paris (2016) except Cardiff, Wales: 6/23/04 (2015)

=== Touring ===
Image	Name	Years active	Instruments	Details
	Keith Morris	1984 (substitute)	lead vocals	Morris filled in for Anthony Kiedis at a show on May 12, 1984, when Kiedis failed to show up for the performance.
	Chuck Biscuits (Charles Montgomery)	1985 (substitute)	drums	Biscuits replaced regular drummer Cliff Martinez during a few shows on the Freaky Styley Tour in 1985.
	Tree (Keith Barry)	1989–1990	tenor saxophone	Tree performed on the Mother's Milk Tour between 1989 and 1990. He also contributed to the album.
	Kristen Vigard	1989	backing vocals	Vigard performed on the Mother's Milk Tour in 1989 and also contributed backing vocals on three of the album's songs along with backing vocals on 1995's One Hot Minute album on the song "Falling Into Grace".
	Vicky Calhoun	1989	backing vocals	Calhoun performed on the Mother's Milk Tour in 1989 and also contributed backing vocals on four of album's songs.
	Rob Rule	1995–1996	rhythm guitar; backing vocals	Rule and Phoenix were part of the touring lineup for the One Hot Minute Tour between 1995 and 1996.
	Rain Phoenix	1995–1996	backing vocals	Rule and Phoenix were part of the touring lineup for the One Hot Minute Tour between 1995 and 1996.
	Acacia Ludwig	1996	backing vocals	Ludwig joined Phoenix as a second backing vocalist in the touring lineup of the band during early 1996.
	Chris Warren	2006–present	keyboards; synthesizers; electronic percussion; backing vocals	Warren has toured with the band since the Stadium Arcadium Tour, appearing on multiple live releases.
	Marcel Rodríguez-López	2006–2007	percussion; keyboards	Rodríguez-López performed at a number of shows on the Stadium Arcadium Tour in 2006 and 2007.
	Mauro Refosco	2011–2014	percussion	Refosco performed live percussion for RHCP on the I'm with You World Tour and the 2013–2014 Tour. Since 2014, he turned down from the touring, and being featured as session musicians only.
	Mike Bulger	2011	piano; keyboards; trumpet	Bulger performed with RHCP at a number of warm-up shows in 2011 prior to the I'm with You World Tour.
	Nate Walcott	2016–2019	piano; keyboards; trumpet	Walcott performed live with RHCP during The Getaway World Tour.
	Samuel Bañuelos III	2016–2019; 2022	additional bass	Bañuelos performed live with RHCP during The Getaway World Tour and for one show in 2022.
	Stephen Perkins	2020 (substitute)	drums	Perkins filled in for Chad Smith at the band's performance on February 8, 2020. Smith had a previously scheduled art exhibit making him unable to attend.

== Lineups ==
Period	Members	Releases
December 1982 – March 25, 1983 (Tony Flow and the Miraculously Majestic Masters of Mayhem)	Anthony Kiedis – lead vocals; Hillel Slovak – guitar, backing vocals; Flea – bass, backing vocals; Jack Irons – drums, backing vocals	none
March 25 – December 1983	Anthony Kiedis – lead vocals; Hillel Slovak – guitar, backing vocals; Flea – bass, backing vocals; Jack Irons – drums, backing vocals	none
December 1983 – January 1985	Anthony Kiedis – lead vocals; Jack Sherman – guitar, backing vocals; Flea – bass, backing vocals; Cliff Martinez – drums	The Red Hot Chili Peppers (1984)
January 1985 – April 1986	Anthony Kiedis – lead vocals; Hillel Slovak – guitar, backing vocals; Flea – bass, backing vocals; Cliff Martinez – drums	Freaky Styley (1985)
April 1986 – June 25, 1988	Anthony Kiedis – lead vocals; Hillel Slovak – guitar, backing vocals; Flea – bass, backing vocals; Jack Irons – drums, backing vocals	The Uplift Mofo Party Plan (1987); The Abbey Road E.P. (1988); Red Hot Skate Rock (1988)
August – September 1988	Anthony Kiedis – lead vocals; DeWayne McKnight – guitar, backing vocals; Flea – bass, backing vocals; D. H. Peligro – drums	"Blues for Meister" (1994)
September – November 1988	Anthony Kiedis – lead vocals; John Frusciante – guitar, backing vocals; Flea – bass, backing vocals; D. H. Peligro – drums	none
December 3, 1988 – May 7, 1992	Anthony Kiedis – lead vocals; John Frusciante – guitar, backing vocals; Flea – bass, trumpet, backing vocals; Chad Smith – drums, percussion	Mother's Milk (1989); "Show Me Your Soul" (1990); Psychedelic Sexfunk Live from Heaven (1990); Blood Sugar Sex Magik (1991)
July 1992 – September 1993	Anthony Kiedis – lead vocals; Arik Marshall – guitar, backing vocals; Flea – bass, trumpet, backing vocals; Chad Smith – drums, percussion	none
September 1993	Anthony Kiedis – lead vocals; Jesse Tobias – guitar, backing vocals; Flea – bass, trumpet, backing vocals; Chad Smith – drums, percussion	none
September 20, 1993 – April 3, 1998	Anthony Kiedis – lead vocals; Dave Navarro – guitar, backing vocals; Flea – bass, trumpet, backing vocals; Chad Smith – drums, percussion	One Hot Minute (1995); "I Found Out" (1995); "Love Rollercoaster" (1996)
April 18, 1998 – July 29, 2009	Anthony Kiedis – lead vocals; John Frusciante – guitar, keyboards, backing vocals; Flea – bass, trumpet, backing vocals; Chad Smith – drums, percussion	Californication (1999); Off the Map (2001); By the Way (2002); "Havana Affair" (2003); Live at Slane Castle (2003); Red Hot Chili Peppers Live in Hyde Park (2004); Stadium Arcadium (2006); Cardiff, Wales: 6/23/04 (2015)
October 2009 – December 15, 2019	Anthony Kiedis – lead vocals; Josh Klinghoffer – guitar, keyboards, backing vocals; Flea – bass, trumpet, keyboards, backing vocals; Chad Smith – drums, percussion	I'm with You (2011); Live: I'm with You (2011); 2011 Live EP (2012); Live from the Basement (2012); I'm Beside You (2013); I'm with You World Tour (2014); The Getaway (2016); Live in Paris (2016)
December 15, 2019 – present	Anthony Kiedis – lead vocals; John Frusciante – guitar, keyboards, backing vocals; Flea – bass, trumpet, keyboards, backing vocals; Chad Smith – drums, percussion	Unlimited Love (2022); Return of the Dream Canteen (2022)
