= The Uplift Mofo Party Tour =

1987–88 concert tour by Red Hot Chili Peppers

- Tour by Red Hot Chili Peppers
- Promotional poster for the tour
- Associated album: The Uplift Mofo Party Plan
- Start date: October 22, 1987
- End date: June 4, 1988

Red Hot Chili Peppers concert chronology
- Freaky Styley Tour (1985–1986); The Uplift Mofo Party Tour (1987–1988); Turd Town Tour (1988)

The Uplift Mofo Party Tour (also known during 1987 to 1988 dates as the Monsters of Funk Tour) was a concert tour by Red Hot Chili Peppers to support their third studio album The Uplift Mofo Party Plan. Founding drummer Jack Irons returned to the band the previous year to finish out the band's tour and record the next album, The Uplift Mofo Party Plan. The album ended up being the only album and full tour to feature the four founding band members: Anthony Kiedis, Flea, Hillel Slovak and Irons. It was the band's biggest tour at the time and featured their first trip to Europe. Kiedis, who started to develop a major drug problem on the previous tour, started to fall deeper into his addiction and Slovak's addiction to heroin only grew stronger as well. Slovak died of a heroin overdose a few weeks after the end of the tour on June 25, 1988. The surviving three members regrouped for a small boat trip with then manager, Lindy Goetz. It was there that Irons decided he could no longer deal with being in the band and Slovak's death was too hard for him to handle so he decided to quit the band again, this time for good.

A 30-minute film titled Red Hot Skate Rock was released in 1988. The footage was shot on September 20, 1987, in Los Angeles, California, by Vision Street Wear and featured an 8-song set by the band while many of the top skaterboarders from that era performed demos. The film was released on DVD in 2002 under the name, Vision: Vision DVD Volume 2.

== Tour ==
The Chili Peppers noted that during the tour, their fan base had rapidly increased both in size and enthusiasm. Kiedis recalled "During the Uplift tour I remember actually feeling a change taking place not just in the amount of people showing up at the gigs but the intensity of the fan base." Flea added that "We were in love with those songs and how much fun we were having playing them."

Despite the band's new enthusiasm, Kiedis and Slovak continued to struggle with their worsening drug addictions. Kiedis was even briefly fired by the band prior to the tour. Both Kiedis and Slovak stopped using heroin prior to the tour and decided to help each other "steer clear" of the drug. During the tour both experienced intense heroin withdrawal, with Slovak much more unstable than Kiedis. His withdrawal symptoms took a toll on his ability to play his instrument; at one point Slovak had a mental breakdown and was unable to play a show, leaving the rest of the band to play an entire set with no guitar. He recovered a few days later, but his bandmates felt he was not healthy enough to perform and replaced Slovak with DeWayne McKnight for a few shows. After a few days with McKnight, the band decided to give Slovak another chance, and he rejoined for the European leg of the tour. Kiedis attempted to take Slovak to drug addiction counseling, but Slovak had difficulty admitting that his addiction was serious enough to require medical help.

The tour is also notable for Faith No More being the supporting act for the first two and a half months. At the time, Faith No More was promoting their second release and major label debut Introduce Yourself. Guitarist Jim Martin recalled: "We were travelling in a box van with no windows. We drove all the way to the east coast for the first show. Flea asked me if we liked to smoke weed. I said: ‘Yes’ and he said: ‘We're going to get along just fine’. We did something like 52 dates in 56 days." A long feud between Kiedis and future Faith No More frontman Mike Patton started in 1990 when Kiedis accused Patton of ripping off his sound and style. Although he was not a member of band at the time of the tour in 1987, Patton later stated that by 1990, Faith No More were "really big in Europe and enjoying a lot more notoriety than the Chili Peppers were" which annoyed Kiedis and sparked the grudge. During a 1999 Halloween show in Michigan, the feud reached a high point when Mr. Bungle, Mike Patton's other band, parodied the Chili Peppers in Anthony Kiedis' home state—even going so far as to mimic shooting up heroin onstage. Around that time, Patton had given an interview accusing Red Hot Chili Peppers of sabotaging potential bookings for Mr. Bungle.

== Slovak's death ==
Upon returning home, Slovak isolated himself from the rest of his bandmates and struggled to resist the drug without the mutual support provided by his friends, Kiedis in particular. A few weeks after the band returned from the tour, the members attempted to get in contact with Slovak, but were unable to find him for several days. Slovak was found dead by police in his Hollywood apartment on June 27, 1988. During his autopsy, authorities determined that he had died on June 25, 1988, due to a heroin overdose. Irons subsequently left the group, saying that he did not want to be part of a group where his friends were dying. Kiedis and Flea debated whether they should continue making music but ultimately decided to move ahead, hoping to continue what Slovak "helped build". DeWayne McKnight replaced Slovak but was quickly fired from the band after three shows while Irons' replacement, D.H. Peligro would last long enough to play some shows with eighteen-year-old guitarist John Frusciante, who was a fan of the group and idolized Slovak. Peligro was replaced in November 1988 after the group held a lengthy open auditions; the Red Hot Chili Peppers eventually chose drummer Chad Smith.

== Songs performed ==
Originals

The Red Hot Chili Peppers

- "Baby Appeal"
- "Buckle Down"
- "Get Up and Jump"
- "Green Heaven"
- "Mommy, Where's Daddy?"
- "Out in L.A."
- "Police Helicopter"
- "True Men Don't Kill Coyotes"
- "You Always Sing the Same"

Freaky Styley

- "American Ghost Dance"
- "Battleship"
- "Blackeyed Blonde"
- "Catholic School Girls Rule"
- "Freaky Styley"
- "Hollywood (Africa) (The Meters)
- "Jungle Man"
- "Lovin' and Touchin'"
- "Nevermind"
- "Sex Rap"
- "Thirty Dirty Birds"
- "Yertle the Turtle"

The Uplift Mofo Party Plan

- "Backwoods"
- "Behind the Sun" (performed only once live)
- "Fight Like a Brave"
- "Funky Crime"
- "Love Trilogy"
- "Me and My Friends
- "No Chump Love Sucker"
- "Organic Anti-Beat Box Band"
- "Party on Your Pussy"
- "Skinny Sweaty Man"
- "Subterranean Homesick Blues" (Bob Dylan)

The Abbey Road E.P.

- "Fire" (Jimi Hendrix)

Cover songs (used as intros or during jams unless otherwise noted)
- "Anarchy in the U.K." (Sex Pistols)
- "Back in Black" (AC/DC)
- "Changes" (David Bowie) (w/ Bob Forrest)
- "Cosmic Slop" (Parliament Funkadelic) (w/ Bob Forrest)
- "Get Up, Stand Up" (Bob Marley and the Wailers)
- "Handclapping Song" (The Meters)
- "Heartbreaker" (Led Zeppelin)
- "Higher Ground" (Stevie Wonder) (jam with Bob Forrest)
- "I Don't Live Today" (Jimi Hendrix)
- "I Wanna Be Your Dog" (The Stooges)
- "I Want You Back" (The Jackson 5)
- "If 6 Was 9" (Jimi Hendrix) (minus Anthony)
- "F.U." (Bemsha Swing) (Thelonious Monk)
- "Flashlight" (Parliament Funkadelic)
- "Foxy Lady" (Jimi Hendrix)
- "Maggie's Farm" (Bob Dylan) (w/ Bob Forrest)
- "Nervous Breakdown" (Black Flag)
- "Rapper's Delight" (Sugar Hill Gang)
- "See That My Grave Is Kept Clean" (Thelonious Monster) (w/ Bob Forrest)
- "Stone Free" (Jimi Hendrix) (minus Anthony)
- "Super Stupid" (Parliament Funkadelic) (w/ Bob Forrest)
- "Thank You (Falettinme Be Mice Elf Agin)" (Sly and the Family Stone)
- "Third Stone from the Sun" (Jimi Hendrix) (w/ Bob Forrest)
- "Up From the Skies" (Jimi Hendrix) (minus Anthony)
- "We Got the Neutron Bomb" (The Weirdos)
- "What Is Soul?" (Parliament Funkadelic)
- "Whole Lotta Love" (Led Zeppelin)

== Tour overview ==
Out of the album's eleven songs, "Walkin' on Down the Road" is the only one to never be performed live. Flea mentioned that "Behind the Sun" was played live only one time in 1987, but the band was not very happy with the result, so they never played it live again. During the tour the band played a Jimi Hendrix tribute show on September 2, 1987. Kiedis provided vocals on a cover of "Foxy Lady" while Bob Forrest and members of Fishbone provided vocals on the other songs with the Chili Peppers as the backup band. The band also played a special show minus Kiedis on April 2, 1988, with Bob Forrest fronting the band. The tour also marked the first appearance of an instrumental jam that later became "Magic Johnson" on their next album, Mother's Milk.

This tour marked the last time "Battleship", "Behind the Sun", "Buckle Down" and "No Chump Love Sucker" were performed live.

== Opening acts ==
- The Borman Six
- The Busboys
- Butthole Surfers
- The Dickies
- Doggy Rock
- Double Freak
- El Grupo Sexo
- Electric Third Rail
- Faith No More
- Fetchin' Bones
- Firehose
- Fishbone
- Franky Jones
- Go Go Rillas
- Great Train Robbery
- Loves Laughter
- Mundo Aparte
- Poets' Corner
- Primus
- The Sidewinders
- Slammin' Watusis
- Soul Asylum
- T.S.O.L.
- Tai Pink
- Talk Back
- Thelonious Monster
- Urban Dance Squad

== Personnel ==
- Flea – bass, backing vocals
- Jack Irons – drums
- Anthony Kiedis – lead vocals
- Hillel Slovak – guitar, backing vocals
