= Under the Covers: Essential Red Hot Chili Peppers =

Compilation album by Red Hot Chili Peppers
- Released: March 31, 1998
- Genre: Funk rock
- Length: 43:37
- Label: EMI/Capitol
- Producer: Various

Red Hot Chili Peppers chronology
One Hot Minute (1995)	Under the Covers: Essential Red Hot Chili Peppers (1998)	Californication (1999)

Professional ratings
Review scores
Source	Rating
AllMusic	3/5 stars
Pitchfork	3.5/10

Under the Covers: Essential Red Hot Chili Peppers is a compilation album released on March 31, 1998, by the Red Hot Chili Peppers. All of the songs featured are covers mainly from the band's early albums.

The album actually contains 13 tracks even though only ten are listed on the album's back cover. The album was a limited edition release.

== Track listing ==
No.	Title	Writer(s)	Original source	Length
1.	"They're Red Hot" (originally by Robert Johnson)	Robert Johnson	Blood Sugar Sex Magik (1991)	0:59
2.	"Fire" (originally by The Jimi Hendrix Experience)	Jimi Hendrix	The Abbey Road E.P. (1987)	2:01
3.	"Subterranean Homesick Blues" (originally by Bob Dylan)	Bob Dylan	The Uplift Mofo Party Plan (1987)	2:34
4.	"Higher Ground" (originally by Stevie Wonder)	Stevie Wonder	Mother's Milk (1989)	3:20
5.	"If You Want Me to Stay" (originally by Sly and the Family Stone)	Sylvester Stewart	Freaky Styley (1985)	4:06
6.	"Why Don't You Love Me" (originally by Hank Williams)	Hank Williams	The Red Hot Chili Peppers (1984)	3:23
7.	"Tiny Dancer" (live) (originally by Elton John)	Elton John; Bernie Taupin	Previously Unavailable (recorded Megaland, Landgraaf, Netherlands, 06/04/1990)	2:00
8.	"Castles Made of Sand" (live) (originally by The Jimi Hendrix Experience)	Hendrix	Taste the Pain single (1989) (recorded Cleveland, Ohio, 11/21/1989)	3:17
9.	"Dr. Funkenstein" (live) (originally by Parliament)	George Clinton, Jr.; Bootsy Collins; Bernie Worrell	Previously Unavailable (recorded Cleveland, Ohio, 11/21/1989)	1:11
10.	"Hollywood (Africa)" (originally by The Meters)	The Meters	Freaky Styley (1985)	5:03
11.	"Search and Destroy" (originally by Iggy and the Stooges)	James Osterberg; James Williamson	Give It Away single (1991)	3:45
12.	"Higher Ground" (Daddy-O Mix)	Wonder	Taste the Pain single (1989)	5:19
13.	"Hollywood (Africa)" (Extended Dance Mix)	The Meters	Hollywood (Africa) single (1985)	6:32

== Personnel ==
Red Hot Chili Peppers

- Anthony Kiedis – vocals
- Flea – bass
- John Frusciante – guitar (1, 4, 7–9, 11, 12)
- Hillel Slovak – guitar (2, 3, 5, 10, 13)
- Jack Sherman – guitar (6)
- Chad Smith – drums (1, 4, 7–9, 11, 12)
- Jack Irons – drums (2, 3, 5, 10, 13)
- Cliff Martinez – drums (6)

Additional personnel

- Rick Rubin – producer (1, 11)
- Michael Beinhorn – producer (2–4, 8, 9, 12)
- George Clinton – producer (5, 10, 13)
- Andy Gill – producer (6)
- Daddy-O – remix and additional production (12)
- Steve Thompson – remix and additional production (13)
- Michael Barbiero – remix and additional production (13)
- Brendan O'Brien – engineer (1, 11)
- Dave Jordan – mixing (8)
- Marc Rashba – executive producer
- Todd Rosenberg – producer, compiler
- Evren Göknar – mastering
