= Jungle Man (song) =

1985 single by Red Hot Chili Peppers

Single by Red Hot Chili Peppers

from the album Freaky Styley
- B-side: "Nevermind", "Stranded", "Hollywood (Africa)"
- Released: August 16, 1985
- Recorded: 1985
- Genre: Funk rock
- Length: 4:09
- Label: EMI; Capitol Records
- Songwriters: Anthony Kiedis; Flea; Cliff Martinez; Jack Sherman
- Producer: George Clinton

Red Hot Chili Peppers singles chronology
"Get Up and Jump" (1984)	"Jungle Man" (1985)	"Hollywood (Africa)" (1985)

Music video
- "Jungle Man" on YouTube

"Jungle Man" is a song by the American rock band Red Hot Chili Peppers from their 1985 album, Freaky Styley. It was released as the album's first single, however failed to chart. A music video released around the same time of the album's release on August 16, 1985. The band couldn't get a proper music video released, so manager Lindy Goetz used different clips of live performances of the song from May 1985 to January 1986 edited together with the album version of the song playing on top.

In his autobiography "Scar Tissue", Anthony Kiedis reveals the song is an ode to his friend Flea: "this half man, half beast born in the belly of the volcano in Australia and using his thumb as a conductor of thunder on the bass".

== Reception ==
John Leland at Spin said, "Take away the Chilis' glaring flaws and they're just another band. Much of this record sounds like a bunch of white guys playing funk. They do it with some élan, and Fred Wesley and the Horny Horns help, but they sacrifice some of their identity for the sake of competence.

Jason Birchmeier of AllMusic considered "Jungle Man" to be one of the highlights from the album.

== Live performances ==
"Jungle Man" made its live debut in June 1985. It was performed around 24 times however it hasn't been performed live since February 1988.

== Track listing ==
Promo 12" version

1. "Jungle Man" (album version)
2. "Nevermind" (album version)
3. "Stranded"
4. "Hollywood (Africa)" (7" version)

== Personnel ==
- Anthony Kiedis - lead vocals
- Flea - backing vocals, bass guitar
- Hillel Slovak - backing vocals, guitar
- Cliff Martinez - drums
- unknown - backing vocals

=== Production ===
- George Clinton - producer
- Greg Ward - mixing
