= Out in L.A. =

Compilation album by Red Hot Chili Peppers
- Released: November 1, 1994
- Recorded: 1983–1990
- Genres: Funk rock; funk
- Length: 54:12
- Label: EMI/Capitol
- Producer: Various

Red Hot Chili Peppers chronology
The Plasma Shaft (1994)	Out in L.A. (1994)	The Best of Red Hot Chili Peppers (1994)

Singles from Out in L.A.
- 1. "Deck the Halls" Released: 1994

Out in L.A. is a compilation of rare tracks by the Red Hot Chili Peppers released November 1, 1994, on EMI. Interpreted by music critics as an attempt by EMI to capitalize on the group's newfound success with Warner Bros., it collects remixes, demo recordings, live covers and outtakes. On release, Out in L.A. received negative reviews from music critics.

== Background ==
The tracks contained are varied with the inclusion of four remixes, live cover songs of Jimi Hendrix and Thelonious Monk ("F.U." is a joke lyric over the melody of "Bemsha Swing"), the band's first demos and joke songs. The 1988 outtake, "Blues for Meister", which was the first song sung by Flea that the band released, was the only song released or recorded with then guitarist DeWayne McKnight who would soon be replaced by John Frusciante that same year. The song uses a backing track recorded by Flea and Irons, before Slovak's death.

The songs "Stranded" and "Flea Fly" are two of the band's earliest recordings from 1983 when they went under the name Tony Flow And The Miraculously Majestic Masters Of Mayhem. The other demo recordings included come from the band's first demo tape are the first the band made and are described in Anthony Kiedis' autobiography Scar Tissue as being the most prolific sessions the band ever had. The demo recording was produced by Spit Stix, Flea's then bandmate in the legendary punk band, Fear. Four of these songs were recorded with Jack Sherman and Cliff Martinez on the band's first album however, these early versions are said to be the preferred ones as they capture the original vibe intended. Hillel Slovak's and Jack Irons's playing are instrumental to this. Many of these tracks were included in the remastered versions of the band's first two albums and it was these demos that eventually got the band their first shows and eventually a recording contract with EMI. The band's joke cover of "Deck the Halls" was released as a very rare 7-inch promotional jukebox single in 1994. "Knock Me Down" was featured as the track's b-side.

== Critical reception ==
Professional ratings
Review scores
Source	Rating
AllMusic	2/5 stars
The Commercial Appeal	2.5/5 stars
Encyclopedia of Popular Music	1/5 stars
Entertainment Weekly	B−
The Great Rock Discography	3/10
NME	6/10
The Rolling Stone Album Guide	1/5 stars
Select	0/5 stars
Spin Alternative Record Guide	4/10

In a zero out of five review, Select critic Matt Hall referred to it as EMI's "predictable" collection of outtakes, demos, remixes and "ropey" live cuts, released to capitalize on the band's success with Warner Bros., but complained that "everything passable that the Chilis recorded for EMI has already been released." He criticized the inclusion of short tracks and felt that the 12" mix of "Higher Ground" was the album's only consolation, hoping that the album's compiler "will get septic fingers from the splinters gained while indulging in such a blatant display of barrel-scraping." Bob Bahr of The Courier-Journal also called it an attempt by EMI to cash-in on the group's Warner Bros. success and believed that hardcore Chili Peppers fans would not need the album. He praised the first three remixes, particularly the dance remix of "If You Want Me to Stay", and drew attention to the live tracks, but believed the demos and unreleased song snippets are radio unfriendly, concluding that "the only thing that the rough-hewn Out in L.A. proves is that the Red Hot Chili Peppers needed no studio tricks or mirrors to be funky. And we knew that anyway."

More favorably, NME's Dele Fadele wrote that while Out in L.A. was not a definitive examination of the group's "motherfunky beatnik mishmash" period, as their first two albums to be more revealing in that respect, "its selection of remixes, OK live tracks, dodgy demos and self-indulgent unreleased songs induces a wry smile." Chuck Eddy of Entertainment Weekly wrote that the outtakes "aren't bad" by the standards of "overrated" bands, believing that the "more recent freaked-out dance remixes wear out their welcome sooner than the decade-old demo tape pogos, partly because their rubber-lipped rapping was less awkward when they were trying to be old-school." Larry Nager of Honolulu Star-Bulletin notes that while the album displays the group's "patented funk-heavy sound", their a cappella rendition of "Deck the Halls" "won't be keeping Boyz II Men up nights." In the Green Bay Press-Gazette, Gary Graff felt that the contents were "a bit too obscure and inconsistent for all but true devotees", with tracks combined in "a manner too scattershot to shed any real light on the Chili Peppers' modern funk attack." While criticising the demo tracks for being inferior to their completed versions, he praised Ben Grosse's "taut and spicy" remix of "Behind the Sun", and the "fun" concert recordings.

Retrospectively, AllMusic's Stephen Thomas Erlewine described it as a "tepid collection of remixes and obscurities" which would only appeal to devoted fans of the band, although "even they might have their patience tested by this overly long compilation." In The Rolling Stone Album Guide, Out in L.A. is described as a collection of "early-Eighties demos that are essentially an homage to Flea's bass playing and little else." Ira Robbins of Trouser Press opines that the compilation provides an "otherwise unavailable" taste of the group, with its diverse array of remixes, "demos of lesser tracks" from early albums, "fragmentary outtakes that deserved to remain that way", "crummy" live covers and "a brief, rude jazz incident" ("F.U."). "Of possible value to scholars of the band," he wrote, "Out in L.A. is way too uneven to be of serious concern to anyone else." Bob Mack, in the Spin Alternative Record Guide, called Out in L.A. a "hodge and podge" compilation "mostly larded with Cure-like remixes and thin live tracks."

== Track listing ==
All tracks are written by Michael Balzary, Jack Irons, Anthony Kiedis and Hillel Slovak unless otherwise noted.

No.	Title	Writer(s)	Length
1.	"Higher Ground" (12-inch vocal mix – Stevie Wonder cover)	Stevie Wonder	5:18
2.	"Hollywood (Africa)" (extended dance mix – The Meters cover)	Joseph Modeliste; Art Neville; Leo Nocentelli; George Porter, Jr.	6:33
3.	"If You Want Me to Stay" (Pink Mustang Mix – Sly & the Family Stone cover)	Sylvester Stewart	7:03
4.	"Behind the Sun" (Ben Grosse remix)		4:43
5.	"Castles Made of Sand" (live – Jimi Hendrix cover)	Jimi Hendrix	3:18
6.	"Special Secret Song Inside" (live)		3:12
7.	"F.U." (live – Thelonious Monk cover)	Thelonious Monk	1:17
8.	"Get Up and Jump" (demo version)		2:37
9.	"Out in L.A." (demo version)		1:56
10.	"Green Heaven" (demo version)		3:50
11.	"Police Helicopter" (demo version)		1:12
12.	"Nevermind" (demo version)		2:09
13.	"Sex Rap" (demo version)		1:35
14.	"Blues for Meister"		2:54
15.	"You Always Sing the Same" (demo version)		0:16
16.	"Stranded"		0:24
17.	"Flea Fly"		0:39
18.	"What It Is"	Michael Balzary; Anthony Kiedis	4:03
19.	"Deck the Halls"	Traditional	1:02
Total length:			54:12

Notes

- A majority of the track lengths given on the back cover are incorrect, most notably for "Flea Fly", which is listed as 1:37. Another key mistake was the listing of the incorrect recording dates for the demos. The booklet states they were recorded in 1982 however the band did not form until 1983. Neither of these mistakes were ever corrected. The album also fails to even list recording dates for a few songs most notably "Blues for Meister" and "Deck the Halls".

== Personnel ==
Red Hot Chili Peppers

- Anthony Kiedis – lead vocals
- Hillel Slovak – guitar (on tracks 2–4, 8–13, 15–18)
- Jack Irons – drums (on tracks 4, 8–18)
- John Frusciante – guitar (on tracks 1, 5–7)
- Flea – bass guitar, lead vocals (on track 14), trumpet
- Chad Smith – drums (on tracks 1, 5–7)
- Cliff Martinez – drums (on tracks 2–3)
- DeWayne McKnight – guitar, backing vocals (uncredited) (on track 14)

Additional musicians

- Keith Barry – backing vocals

Production

- Michael Barbiero – remixing
- Michael Beinhorn – producer
- Tom Cartwright – compilation/soundtrack producer
- George Clinton – producer
- Daddy O – engineer for remixes, producer
- Ben Grosse – remixing
- Bruce Harris – executive producer
- Dave Jerden – mix engineer
- Spit Stix – producer (on tracks 8–13, 15–18)
- Steve Thompson – producer, remixing
- Vincent M. Vero – compilation/soundtrack producer

== Charts ==
Chart performance for Out in L.A.
Chart (1994)	Peak position
Dutch Albums (Album Top 100)	94
Swedish Albums (Sverigetopplistan)	44
Swiss Albums (Schweizer Hitparade)	37
UK Albums (Official Charts)	61
US Billboard 200	82
