= Game Night (soundtrack) =

2018 film soundtrack album

Game Night (Original Motion Picture Soundtrack)

Film score by Cliff Martinez
- Released: February 16, 2018
- Recorded: 2017–2018
- Studio: Eastwood Scoring Stage, Warner Bros. Studios, Burbank, California; WEA Studios, New York City; Moonglow Ranch, California
- Genre: Film score
- Length: 44:36
- Label: WaterTower Music
- Producer: Cliff Martinez

Cliff Martinez chronology
Den of Thieves (2018)	Game Night (2018)	Hotel Artemis (2018)

Game Night (Original Motion Picture Soundtrack) is the film score to the 2018 film Game Night directed by Jonathan Goldstein and John Francis Daley, starring Jason Bateman and Rachel McAdams. The film score is composed by Cliff Martinez, in his first score for a comedy film. The album was released through WaterTower Music on February 16, 2018.

== Background ==
In September 2017, it was announced that Cliff Martinez would compose the score for Game Night. Martinez stated that he wanted to write a score for a comedy for a long time but could not get such opportunities. When he was offered to score Game Night, he watched Vacation and the first two Horrible Bosses films, liking the work of Goldstein and Daley. The directors invited him to Atlanta to watch the shooting so that Martinez could provide the ideas for the score.

Martinez noted that his music from the television series The Knick served as the influence of Game Night, which he felt that the "colossal, latent comic potential" had been wrapped up in to the score. The directors intended that they wanted a synth score as it evoked the moody fun of 1980s which takes place in one night, and this modernized approach was an exciting part of the film. The score was partly recorded at Martinez's homestay in Moonglow Ranch in California while the orchestra was recorded at the Warner Bros. Eastwood Scoring Stage in Burbank.

== Reception ==
Jon Frosch of The Hollywood Reporter called it a "propulsive electronic score". Andrew Parker of TheGATE.ca called it a "surprisingly intense musical score." Brian Gallagher of MovieWeb wrote "Another thing that surprised me was the phenomenal score by Cliff Martinez (Drive)... not that it was phenomenal, but merely that he scored a movie like this, with directors John Francis Daley and Jonathan Goldstein mentioning during the Q&A that this was the composer's first ever comedy." Jack Pooley of WhatCulture wrote "Martinez's score is especially effective during the action sequences: the opening set-piece where Brooks is "taken", leading to genuinely brutal fight scene, is all the more intense thanks to the composer's pulsing synth work."

Hannah Strong of Little White Lies wrote "a banging Cliff Martinez synth extravaganza blasts away in the background". Josh Spiegel of /Film wrote "The Cliff Martinez score feels less apropos to a wacky comedy, and closer to something like his work in Drive or Spring Breakers." Stephanie Merry of The Washington Post called it a "propulsive and tense electronic score". A. A. Dowd of The A.V. Club called it a "a sinewy Cliff Martinez thriller score". Joe Reid of Decider wrote "In a development you’re almost certainly not prepared for, Game Night features what is hands-down one of the best film scores of the year, a synth-y, propulsive soundtrack by Drive composer Cliff Martinez. Give it a listen — you will not be disappointed."

== Track listing ==
No.	Title	Length
1.	"Let's Get Drunk"	1:59
2.	"Does Anyone Have Any Food Allergies"	1:35
3.	"You Have To Try This Cheese"	2:00
4.	"I've Seen His Dick"	1:49
5.	"Don't You Johnny Cochran Me"	1:40
6.	"Oh My God I Shot You"	5:05
7.	"Isn't That Your Neighbor"	3:46
8.	"Bastien"	1:27
9.	"Son Of Boomer"	1:35
10.	"Officer Down"	1:28
11.	"All We Did Is Eat The Pellets"	1:37
12.	"If You're Late He Dies"	1:54
13.	"I'm Not The Best Judge Of Chemistry"	1:36
14.	"I Cheat At Everything"	3:20
15.	"Fight Clubs Are Real"	1:35
16.	"Asshole Walks Among Us"	4:13
17.	"We're Not Digging Thru Your Feces"	2:10
18.	"Bullet Hole Rides Again"	1:56
19.	"That's How You Get The Drop"	1:40
20.	"Ryan Spots the Egg"	2:11
Total length:		44:36

== Personnel ==
Credits adapted from WaterTower Music:

- Music composer and producer – Cliff Martinez
- Additional music – Peter G. Adams, Thor Laewe
- Digital recordist – Larry Mah
- Recording – Greg Hayes
- Mixing – Greg Hayes, Thor Laewe
- Mixing assistance – Matt Friedman
- Mastering – Scott Levitin
- Score editor – David Channing, Louie Schultz
- Music supervisor – Manish Raval, Tom Wolfe
- Music coordinator – Kim Baum
- Copyist – Booker White
- Art direction – Sandeep Sriram
- Executive in charge of music for New Line Cinema – Erin Scully
- Executive in charge of WaterTower Music – Jason Linn
- Music business affairs executive – Ari Taitz

Orchestra

- Orchestra – Hollywood Studio Symphony
- Orchestrator and conductor – Randy Miller
- Contractor – Gina Zimmitti
- Concertmaster – Alyssa Park

Instruments

- Bass – Drew Dembowski, Ed Meares, Eric Shetzen, Geoff Osika, Ian Walker, Oscar Hidalgo, Thomas Harte, Mike Valerio
- Cello – Charlie Tyler, Dennis Karmazyn, Eric Byers, Erika Duke, Giovanna Clayton, Jacob Braun, Ross Gasworth, Tim Loo, Trevor Handy, Vanessa Freebairn-Smith, Steve Erdody
- French horn – Dan Kelley, Jenny Kim, Laura Brenes, Steve Becknell, Teag Reaves, Dylan Hart
- Trombone – Alan Kaplan, Bill Reichenbach, Steve Trapani, Steve Holtman, Bill Booth, Alex Iles
- Trumpet – Barry Perkins, Dan Rosenbloom, Jon Lewis, Rob Schaer
- Tuba – Gary Hickman, Doug Tornquist
- Viola – Aaron Oltman, Alma Fernandez, Andrew Duckles, Brian Dembow, Caroline Buckman, Carolyn Riley, Dave Walther, Erik Rynearson, Jonathan Moerschel, Lynne Richburg, Meredith Crawford, Rob Brophy
- Violin – Aimee Kreston, Amy Hershberger, Ana Landauer, Andrew Bulbrook, Ben Jacobson, Charlie Bisharat, Darius Campo, Grace Oh, Ina Veli, Jackie Brand, Jessica Guideri, Josefina Vergara, Julie Gigante, Katie Sloan, Katia Popov, Maia Jasper, Marisa Kuney, Natalie Leggett, Phil Levy, Sara Parkins, Sarah Thornblade, Songa Lee, Tammy Hatwan, Tereza Stanislav, Roger Wilkie
