= Jungle Man =

Jungle Man may refer to:

- Jungle Man (film), a 1941 film directed by Harry L. Fraser
- "Jungle Man" (song), a song by the Red Hot Chili Peppers
- "Jungle Man", a song by the Meters, on their 1974 album, Rejuvenation
- Daniel Cates, a professional poker player nicknamed "jungleman12" or simply "Jungleman"
