= The Uplift Mofo Party Plan =

1987 album by Red Hot Chili Peppers

Studio album by Red Hot Chili Peppers
- Released: September 29, 1987
- Recorded: May 1987
- Studios: Capitol (Hollywood), Eldorado (Hollywood)
- Genres: Funk rock; funk metal
- Length: 37:54
- Label: EMI Manhattan
- Producer: Michael Beinhorn

Red Hot Chili Peppers chronology
Freaky Styley (1985)	The Uplift Mofo Party Plan (1987)	The Abbey Road E.P. (1988)

Singles from The Uplift Mofo Party Plan
- 1. "Fight Like a Brave" Released: September 29, 1987

The Uplift Mofo Party Plan is the third studio album by American rock band Red Hot Chili Peppers, released on September 29, 1987, by EMI Manhattan. Due to prior obligations resulting in temporary personnel changes following the band's formation in 1983, The Uplift Mofo Party Plan is the only studio album to feature all four founding members of the band on every track: vocalist Anthony Kiedis, bassist Flea, guitarist Hillel Slovak and drummer Jack Irons. This is also the last album with Slovak before his death from a drug overdose in 1988, and the only full-length album to feature Irons. "Fight Like a Brave" was released as the album's only single, although "Me and My Friends" received minor radio airplay. In 1992, "Behind the Sun" was released as a single and music video to promote What Hits!?.

The album features the band's signature funk rock musical style, but also is influenced by reggae and heavy metal. For the album, Red Hot Chili Peppers recruited new producer Michael Beinhorn, who encouraged the members to expand their musical horizons in order to create a more diverse work. Bass player Flea later referred to the album as "the 'rockingest' record" the band has ever made.

The album was much more successful than its predecessors, both critically and commercially, and was the band's first album to enter the Billboard 200, where it charted at number 148. Although Uplift's follow-up Mother's Milk would reach Gold first, The Uplift Mofo Party Plan would go on to become the band's earliest effort to do so. Following the tour to promote the album, Slovak died of a heroin overdose, and shortly thereafter, Irons decided to leave the band, unable to cope with his friend's death.

== Background ==
After Red Hot Chili Peppers signed a record deal with EMI in 1983, founding members Hillel Slovak and Jack Irons left the group to focus on their group What Is This?, which had also signed a record deal. Vocalist Anthony Kiedis and bassist Flea hired Jack Sherman as guitarist and Cliff Martinez as drummer, and established themselves as a prominent funk rock band with their 1984 debut album The Red Hot Chili Peppers. Disappointed with the results of the production, Kiedis and Flea replaced Sherman with Slovak, who had quit his band, What Is This?, several weeks earlier. The group's George Clinton-produced second album, Freaky Styley (1985), was Slovak's first studio album with the band. In early 1986, the band began work on their upcoming album, and EMI gave the Chili Peppers a budget of $5,000 to record a demo tape. The band chose to work with producer and former Public Image Ltd. guitarist Keith Levene, because he shared the members' interest in drugs. Levene and Slovak put aside $2,000 of the budget to spend on drugs without telling the rest of the group, which created tension between the members. Martinez' "heart was no longer in the band", but he did not quit, so Kiedis and Flea fired him. After the firing of Martinez, original drummer Jack Irons rejoined the band, which marked the first time all four founding members were together since 1983.

Both Kiedis and Slovak struggled with debilitating heroin addictions, which grew worse as the band was preparing to record Uplift. Due to his addiction, Kiedis lacked the motivation to contribute to the band musically, and appeared at rehearsal "literally asleep." He was asked to leave the band in order to undergo drug rehabilitation. During that time, the band won the LA Weekly Band of the Year award, prompting Kiedis to quit using heroin cold turkey. He visited his mother in Michigan for guidance, who drove him to drug rehabilitation immediately after picking him up from the airport upon seeing his unhealthy appearance. He checked into Salvation Army rehabilitation clinic in Grand Rapids, an experience which he initially detested until he noted that the other people in the clinic were understanding of his struggles and were trying to help him. He moved in with his mother after 20 days at the clinic, a time which marked the first time he was completely abstinent from drugs since he was 11 years old. After Kiedis completed his stint in rehab, he felt a "whole new wave of enthusiasm" due to his sobriety and wrote the lyrics to a new song entitled "Fight Like a Brave" on the flight home. He rejoined the Red Hot Chili Peppers in Los Angeles to record the group's next album.

== Recording ==
It wound up turning into a seven or eight-month ordeal of uncertainty and frustration. We got spread thin very, very fast on the money the record label allocated us. This was a crazy, crazy record. That it even came out at all is a miracle considering the diverse personalities.

— Producer Michael Beinhorn, on the recording of the album

While Kiedis was in rehab, the band sought a new producer for their next album. Aspiring producer Michael Beinhorn was looking for work at EMI Records after several unsuccessful projects on other labels, when a man working at EMI approached Beinhorn and suggested that he work with the Red Hot Chili Peppers, as "no one [knew] what to do with them". Beinhorn recalled of the situation, saying, "Though their music all seemed kind of abstract, there was definitely an excitement to it. I thought they needed a lot of arrangement help ... I also quickly learned that [executives] at the record label actually hated the Chili Peppers, like openly reviled them so bad that they didn't even want them to succeed. It was the weirdest thing." He contacted the band to meet up, and instead of arranging a formal meeting, the band proposed to meet him at a club in New Orleans called Tipitina's. Beinhorn was impressed by the band's originality and its non-conformist attitude; as a result, he decided to work with the band. Kiedis then sat down with Beinhorn to discuss the album's recording; Kiedis planned to record the album in ten days and write the songs during the recording sessions.

The album was recorded in Capitol Studios Studio B on the ground floor of the Capitol Records Building in Hollywood. Although Kiedis had recently become clean, his withdrawal symptoms increased; therefore, this affected his musical contributions to the group. After fifty days of sobriety, Kiedis decided to take drugs again as a one-time attempt to celebrate his new music, which caused his resumed addiction. The recording process for the album became difficult, as Kiedis would often disappear to seek drugs. Beinhorn recalled that "There were points in pre-production where I really thought the record wasn't gonna get made." Kiedis felt "excruciating pain and guilt and shame" whenever he'd miss a recording session, so he tried writing lyrics and searching for drugs all at once; although the band was so upset about his drug use and frequent disappearances, they were impressed with his musical output at the time.

Kiedis's drug use disrupted the early recording process, but the band still had such an enjoyable time recording the album. They were musically inspired by the rejoining of their original drummer Jack Irons, which added "such an important and different element to [their] chemistry." Beinhorn encouraged the band to expand their musical horizons on the album; although the band was initially uncomfortable stepping out of their comfort zone, the members began thinking that Beinhorn was helping them produce their best work. Slovak helped Kiedis record his vocals on the album. In between takes, Slovak ran around the studio out of excitement and said, "This is the most beautiful thing we've ever done." He reflected on his deep connection to the album in his diary, saying, "It was so fun. I'm so extremely proud of everybody's work—it is at times genius." During a jam session, the guitarist created a melodic riff which differed greatly in style from the band's previous work. While Slovak nearly abandoned the riff out of fear that it was too much of a departure stylistically, Beinhorn saw potential in the new melody-based style and encouraged the guitar player to turn the short tune into a full song. While the band was skeptical at first, all members began writing their own musical parts, and the song became one of the album's three singles, "Behind the Sun".

== Music and lyrics ==
"Fight Like a Brave"
"Fight Like a Brave", the first single from The Uplift Mofo Party Plan, exemplifies the band's typical punk and funk rock sound of the period, also marked by Anthony Kiedis' rapping lyrics. The song is also noted for its backing vocals sung by football fans.

"Behind the Sun"
This song was heavily influenced by Slovak's "sultry" guitar sound. The guitarist's melodic riff forms the basis of the song, and Slovak's sitar playing can be heard during the verses.

In the book Give It Away: The Stories Behind Every Song, author Rob Fitzpatrick writes "As far as sheer power goes, The Uplift Mofo Party Plan is the Chili Peppers at their most virile, most chest-beating, most unabashedly macho." However, Kiedis recalls that during the composition of the album, Beinhorn encouraged him to step away from his improvisational speed-rap style in favor of slower, crooning vocals. At the time, Kiedis was very uncomfortable with his singing voice, and felt that the new style was "sappy". Kiedis also observed that guitarist Hillel Slovak's playing evolved during his time away from the group in What Is This?, and that Slovak had adopted a more fluid style featuring "sultry" elements as opposed to his original hard rock techniques.

On The Uplift Mofo Party Plan, Slovak experimented with genres outside of traditional funk music including reggae and speed metal. His melodic riff featured in the song "Behind the Sun" inspired the group to create "pretty" songs with an emphasis on melody. Kiedis describes the song as "pure Hillel inspiration". Slovak also used a talk box on the song "Funky Crime", in which he would sing into a tube while playing to create psychedelic effects. Flea incorporated a "slap" bass style on the album, which would become a staple of the band's early work. "Backwoods" features a "loose, swinging groove" and a "sky-scraping" guitar solo. "Skinny Sweaty Man" contains a rapid tempo and has been described as "hardcore garage psychedelic funkabilly", while "No Chump Love Sucker" displays punk rock and thrash influences. The album also features a cover of Bob Dylan's "Subterranean Homesick Blues", which abandons nearly all of the original song's folk stylistics in favor of the band's signature funk-rock leanings.

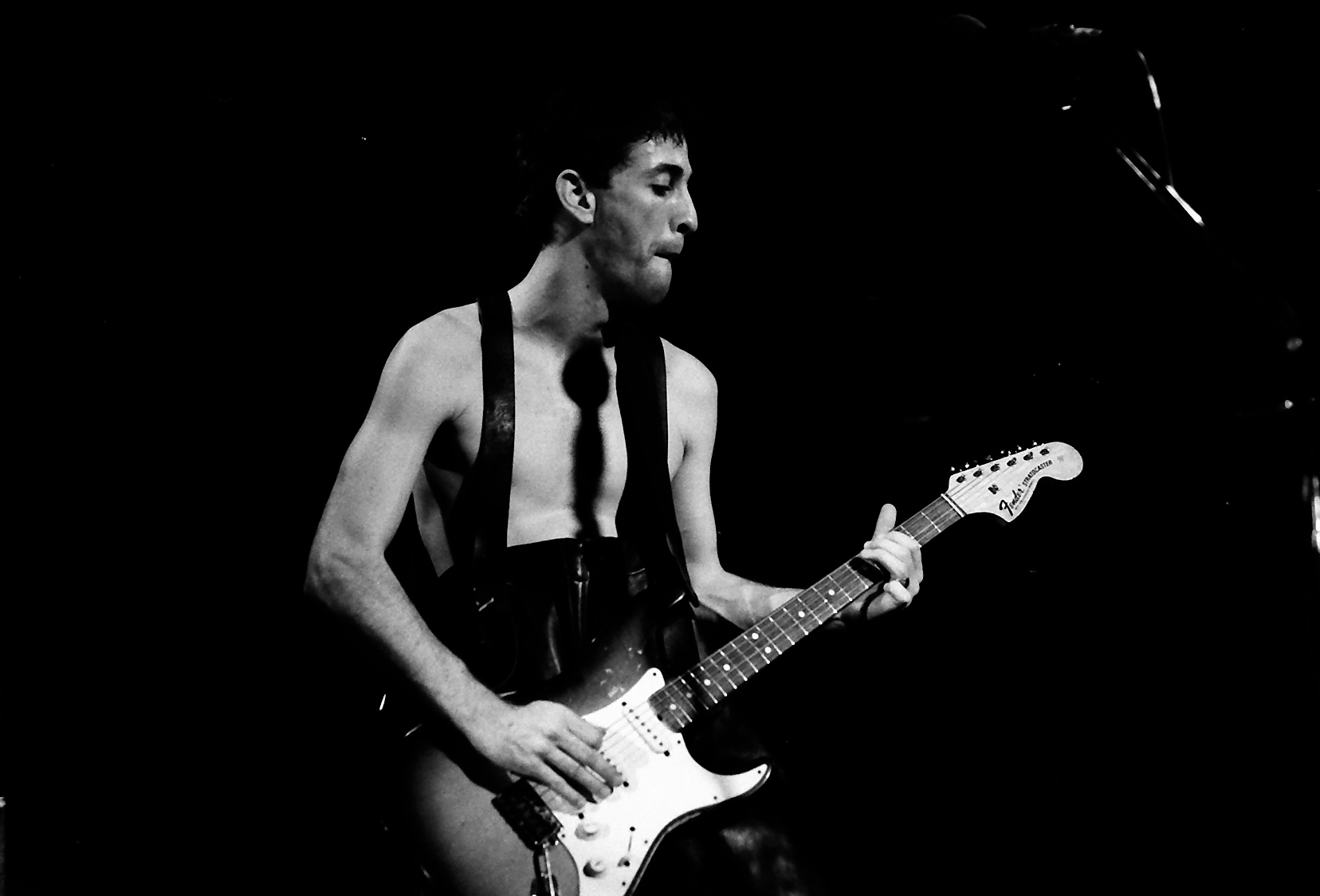
The songs "Skinny Sweaty Man" and "No Chump Love Sucker" were inspired by guitarist Hillel Slovak.

The majority of the lyrics in the album focus on friendships between the band members, sex, and life in Los Angeles. The reunion of the four original members of the group had a great influence over the lyrics; Kiedis explained that "a lot of the jubilation in the lyrics of that record are about being united." Kiedis was also inspired by personal experiences of himself and rest of the band members. During the recording of Freaky Styley, Kiedis and Slovak indulged in heavy cocaine use. When Slovak was under the influence, he would often wear brightly colored clothing and dance in a "shuffling" fashion, which became the inspiration for the song "Skinny Sweaty Man" from Uplift. The song "No Chump Love Sucker" was also inspired by Slovak; during the recording of the album, Slovak had been "left high and dry" by a girlfriend who left him for someone who had "more money and more drugs". The song served as a revenge song against "that type of evil, materialistic woman."

"Funky Crime" was reflective of a conversation between the band and George Clinton while writing and recording Freaky Styley. Kiedis described the song as a lyrical description of the conversation, about how music itself is "color-blind" but is "segregated by the media and radio based on their perceptions of the artists." Kiedis wrote "Me and My Friends", a song which "came together nicely", while driving home from San Francisco with his childhood friend Joe Walters. "Backwoods" details the history of rock and roll. Kiedis said that "Love Trilogy" became one of the group's all-time favorite songs; it is about "loving the things that aren't necessarily perfect or always lovable". He explained that "For years, whenever someone would question our lyrics, Flea would say, 'Read 'Love Trilogy' and you'll know what real lyrics are all about.'"

== Release and reception ==
Professional ratings
Review scores
Source	Rating
AllMusic	4/5 stars
Encyclopedia of Popular Music	3/5 stars
The Great Rock Discography	6/10
Los Angeles Times	1.5/4 stars
NME	8/10
MusicHound	2.5/5
The Rolling Stone Album Guide	2/5 stars
Spin Alternative Record Guide	6/10

EMI originally refused to release the album unless the Chili Peppers changed the name of the song "Party on Your Pussy"; the band subsequently renamed the song "Special Secret Song Inside". The Uplift Mofo Party Plan was released on September 29, 1987, and peaked at number 148 on the Billboard 200, which was far more successful than any of the band's previous releases. It was the band's first album to enter the Billboard 200, and has since been certified Gold in the United States. The band filmed a music video for the album's lead single, "Fight Like a Brave", but the song failed to make an impact on any Billboard charts. "Behind the Sun" was not released as a single until 1992, after the band had released two subsequent albums, Mother's Milk and Blood Sugar Sex Magik. The single, which was released to promote the Chili Peppers' What Hits!? compilation album, peaked at number 7 on the Billboard Alternative Songs chart.

The album also helped the Red Hot Chili Peppers earn a dedicated cult fanbase in Los Angeles. One of these fans was John Frusciante, who would later join the band as guitarist after Slovak's death. Frusciante recalled: "The first time I saw the Red Hot Chili Peppers live was at the Variety Arts Center, and that was really amazing ... They were going for this real hard sound. Hillel was doing all this awesome feedback and stuff. It was the most magical experience I ever had in the experience of a show." Frusciante based a lot of his playing style on Slovak's work, and explained, "I learned everything I needed to know about how to sound good with Flea by studying Hillel's playing and I just took it sideways from there."

The album received mixed reviews from critics upon its release. Duncan Strauss of the Los Angeles Times described the album as "hit-and-miss"; while he praised the "tender tunefulness" of "Behind the Sun", he felt that the majority of the songs "wear pretty thin pretty fast, further suggesting that this is a band that's in command on stage—but in trouble in the studio." Bill Meredith of AllMusic observed that "the energy of having these four friends from Los Angeles back together jumps out of the opening anthem 'Fight Like a Brave' and the experimental 'Funky Crime' ... Slovak and Irons brought things to the Chili Peppers that no one else ever has." Blaine Sayers of Consequence of Sound praised Slovak's guitar work on the album, saying that "Slovak proves with these tracks that he was not just a funk guitarist, but he could rock with the best thrash metal bands of the 80s as well." In The Rolling Stone Album Guide (2004), Greg Kot was less impressed, writing that the album was a minor improvement over the band's last two efforts, but felt that the group's offbeat humor detracted from the album: "The California quartet brings a modicum of structure to The Uplift Mofo Party Plan, but their humor—as their famous 'party on your pussy' chorus demonstrates—wouldn't merit an audience in a high-school locker room."

Les Claypool ranked The Uplift Mofo Party Plan as his favorite Red Hot Chili Peppers album, adding that the music helped influence the sound of Primus.

== Tour and Slovak's death ==
The band embarked on an extensive international tour to promote the album. The Chili Peppers noted that during the tour, their fan base had rapidly increased both in size and enthusiasm. Kiedis recalled "During the Uplift tour I remember actually feeling a change taking place not just in the amount of people showing up at the gigs but the intensity of the fan base." Flea added that "We were in love with those songs and how much fun we were having playing them."

Despite the band's new enthusiasm, Kiedis and Slovak continued to struggle with their worsening drug addictions. Both Kiedis and Slovak stopped using heroin prior to the tour and decided to help each other steer clear of the drug. During the tour both experienced intense heroin withdrawal, with Slovak much more unstable than Kiedis. His withdrawal symptoms took a toll on his ability to play his instrument; at one point Slovak had a mental breakdown and was unable to play a show, leaving the rest of the band to play an entire set with no guitar. He recovered a few days later, but his bandmates felt he was not healthy enough to perform and replaced Slovak with DeWayne McKnight for a few shows. After a few days with McKnight, the band decided to give Slovak another chance, and he rejoined for the European leg of the tour. Kiedis attempted to take Slovak to drug addiction counseling, but Slovak had difficulty admitting that his addiction was serious enough to require medical help.

Upon returning home, Slovak isolated himself from the rest of his bandmates, and struggled to resist the drug without the mutual support provided by his friends, Kiedis in particular. A few weeks after the band returned from the tour, the members attempted to get in contact with Slovak, but were unable to find him for several days. Slovak was found dead by police in his Hollywood apartment on June 27, 1988. During his autopsy, authorities determined that he had died on June 25, 1988, due to a heroin overdose. Irons subsequently left the group, saying that he did not want to be part of a group where his friends were dying. Kiedis and Flea debated whether they should continue making music, ultimately deciding to move ahead, hoping to continue what Slovak "helped build". The two recruited eighteen-year-old guitarist John Frusciante, who was a fan of the group and idolized Slovak. To replace Irons, the group held a lengthy open audition process, and eventually chose drummer Chad Smith.

== Live performances ==
"Me and My Friends" has been played on every tour since making its live debut in May 1986 and has become one of the band's most performed songs and one of the few that they still perform from their four 1980s albums. "Organic Anti-Beat Box Band" was performed regularly until 2000 when it was dropped from setlists, but was brought back on October 17, 2026 at a benefit show for the Silverlake Conservatory of Music. Nothing else from the album has been performed since 2003 when the band last played "Skinny Sweaty Man". Most of the songs haven't been performed since the 80s or 90s.

== Track listing ==
All tracks are written by Red Hot Chili Peppers (Anthony Kiedis, Flea, Hillel Slovak, and Jack Irons) except where noted.

The Uplift Mofo Party Plan track listing
No.	Title	Writer(s)	Length
1.	"Fight Like a Brave"		3:51
2.	"Funky Crime"		3:01
3.	"Me and My Friends"		3:05
4.	"Backwoods"		3:05
5.	"Skinny Sweaty Man"		1:15
6.	"Behind the Sun"	Red Hot Chili Peppers, Michael Beinhorn	4:39
7.	"Subterranean Homesick Blues"	Bob Dylan	2:32
8.	"Party on Your Pussy" (Title censored on original release listing as "Special Secret Song Inside")		3:14
9.	"No Chump Love Sucker"		2:42
10.	"Walkin' on Down the Road"	Red Hot Chili Peppers, Cliff Martinez	3:46
11.	"Love Trilogy"		2:39
12.	"Organic Anti-Beat Box Band"		4:00
Total length:			37:54

Bonus tracks on 2003 remastered CD version
No.	Title	Length
13.	"Behind the Sun" (instrumental demo)	2:53
14.	"Me and My Friends" (instrumental demo)	1:54
Total length:		44:43

== Personnel ==
Red Hot Chili Peppers

- Anthony Kiedis – lead and backing vocals
- Hillel Slovak – guitar, sitar (on "Behind the Sun"), talk box, backing vocals
- Flea – bass guitar, backing vocals
- Jack Irons – drums, backing vocals

Additional musicians

- Michael Beinhorn – background vocals
- John Norwood Fisher – background vocals
- David Kendly – background vocals
- Angelo Moore – background vocals
- Annie Newman – background vocals

Production

- Michael Beinhorn – production
- Russell Bracher – mixing assistant
- Judy Clapp – recording engineer
- Stan Katayama – mixing assistant
- John Potoker – mixing
- Howie Weinberg – mastering engineer

Design

- Nels Israelson – photography
- Henry Marquez – art direction
- Gary Panter – cover illustration

== Charts ==
Chart performance for The Uplift Mofo Party Plan
Chart (1988)	Peak position
US Billboard 200	148

== Certifications ==
Certifications for The Uplift Mofo Party Plan
Region	Certification	Certified units/sales
United States (RIAA)	Gold	500,000^{^}
^{^} Shipments figures based on certification alone.
