= Fight Like a Brave =

Single by Red Hot Chili Peppers

from the album The Uplift Mofo Party Plan
- B-side: "Fire"
- Released: 1987
- Genre: Funk metal: punk funk
- Length: 3:51
- Label: EMI
- Songwriters: Flea; Jack Irons; Anthony Kiedis; Hillel Slovak
- Producer: Michael Beinhorn

Red Hot Chili Peppers singles chronology
"Hollywood (Africa)" (1985)	"Fight Like a Brave" (1987)	"Higher Ground" (1989)

Music video
- "Fight Like a Brave" on YouTube

Promotional poster for the single featuring the band's infamous "socks on cocks" look

"Fight Like a Brave" is a song by American rock band Red Hot Chili Peppers. It was released in 1987, as the first and only single from their third studio album, The Uplift Mofo Party Plan (1987). It is also the band's debut single. The single included a cover of the Jimi Hendrix song "Fire" as a B-side, which would later appear on The Abbey Road E.P. and Mother's Milk as a tribute to guitarist Hillel Slovak, who died in 1988.

== Composition ==
Most of the song's lyrics revolve around Anthony Kiedis' addiction to heroin. At the lowest point in Kiedis' addiction, Flea had kicked him out of the Chili Peppers with no intention of letting him back in unless he was proven sober. After getting clean through various rehab programs, he called Flea to tell him of his success, and was accepted back in the band. On the plane ride home, Kiedis wrote this song about his struggles with drugs and his overcoming them.

The song is mostly an attempt to inspire other people like the rehab sessions were motivational for Kiedis to abandon the drugs. Kiedis described "Fight Like a Brave" as "a metaphor for trying to encourage someone who feels as though they don't have a chance [as though] they're grovelling in the gutter of life." He also said the song expressed the band's discontentment with EMI, their label at the time.

== Live performances ==
Despite being a single, the song has only been performed 37 times and has not been performed live since 1989. It was teased on The Getaway World Tour.

== Track listing ==
7" single (1987)

1. "Fight Like a Brave"
2. "Fire"

12" single (1987)

1. "Fight Like a Brave" (Not Our Mix)
2. "Fight Like a Brave" (Boner Beats Mix)
3. "Fight Like a Brave" (Mofo Mix)
4. "Fire"

12" picture disc/12" promo (1987)

1. "Fight Like a Brave" (Mofo Mix)
2. "Fight Like a Brave" (Knucklehead Mix)
3. "Fire"

12" Japanese split promo/DJ copy (1987)

1. "Fight Like a Brave" (album) by Red Hot Chili Peppers
2. "Contradiction" (Heavy Mix) by Lions & Ghosts
