= The Abbey Road E.P. =

EP by The Red Hot Chili Peppers
- Released: May 16, 1988 (UK)
- Recorded: 1984–1988
- Genre: Funk rock
- Length: 15:35
- Label: EMI, Capitol
- Producer: Andrew Gill; George Clinton; Michael Beinhorn

The Red Hot Chili Peppers chronology
The Uplift Mofo Party Plan (1987)	The Abbey Road E.P. (1988)	Mother's Milk (1989)

Professional ratings
Review scores
Source	Rating
AllMusic	2/5 stars

The Abbey Road E.P. is an EP by Red Hot Chili Peppers, released in the UK in May 1988 through EMI America as a way of introducing UK fans to the band's back catalog as they were touring the UK that year.

Out of the five tracks included on this EP, four had already been previously released on the band's first three albums. The only "new" track at the time of release was a cover of the song "Fire" by Jimi Hendrix, which was recorded during the sessions for The Uplift Mofo Party Plan and included in a different mix as the B-side to "Fight Like a Brave". It would later be included on their fourth album Mother's Milk in tribute to Hillel Slovak, the band's original guitarist who plays guitar on the track. Slovak died of a heroin overdose in 1988.

All songs on the EP were also featured on the band's hits compilation, What Hits!?.

== Cover photo ==
The title and cover were a tribute to The Beatles' famous album Abbey Road. Like the Beatles, the cover depicts the four bandmembers walking across a zebra crossing in single file, the twist being that they are all naked except for white tube socks covering their genitals. Wearing only socks in this manner was something they regularly employed in their stage shows at the time.

British photographer Chris Clunn took the cover photo in February 1988. He had to do the shoot twice over consecutive days, because the first time he realised he'd had no film in his camera. Clunn told Kerrang: "It was the first sleeve picture I'd ever taken and I was a bit nervous. I had two cameras – one black and white, one colour. I could finish a roll of film in about 40 seconds so it should have been very quick. It was only when I got back home that I realised I hadn't put any film in the cameras." Clunn told the band's UK record company EMI, which organised the shoot, that the films had fallen out of his pocket and been run over by a lorry. "I actually got two new films and rode over them on a scooter as 'evidence'. I got a phone call about half six the next morning asking me to do it again... Fortunately, both the band and EMI bought the story."

Clunn said another idea for the shoot was to replicate the cover of Please Please Me, where the Beatles are looking down over the stairwell inside EMI's London headquarters in Manchester Square. "We decided against that because they [the Chili Peppers] couldn't get their todgers out," Clunn said.

== Track listing ==
No.	Title	Writer(s)	Length
1.	"Fire"	Jimi Hendrix	2:02
2.	"Backwoods"	Flea, Anthony Kiedis, Jack Irons, Hillel Slovak	3:06
3.	"Catholic School Girls Rule"	Flea, Kiedis, Cliff Martinez	1:57
4.	"Hollywood (Africa)"	The Meters	5:04
5.	"True Men Don't Kill Coyotes"	Flea, Kiedis, Martinez, Jack Sherman	3:38
Total length:			15:35

== Release history ==
- The Abbey Road E.P. (CD, EP, Comp) EMI-Manhattan Records CDP-7-90869-2 US 1988
- The Abbey Road E.P. (12", EP) EMI-Manhattan Records E1-90869 US 1988
- The Abbey Road E.P. (12", EP) EMI-Manhattan Records, 12MT 41, E1-90869 US 1988
- The Abbey Road E.P. (12", EP) EMI-Manhattan Records K 060 20 2633 6 Europe 1988
- The Abbey Road E.P. (7", EP) EMI-Manhattan Records MT 41 UK 1988
- The Abbey Road E.P. (CD, EP, Comp) EMI-Manhattan Records CDP-7-90869-2 UK 1988

Note

Some versions of 12" do not include "Fire" while the 7" version does not include "Fire" and "Catholic School Girls Rule"
