= Cliff Martinez =

American musician and composer

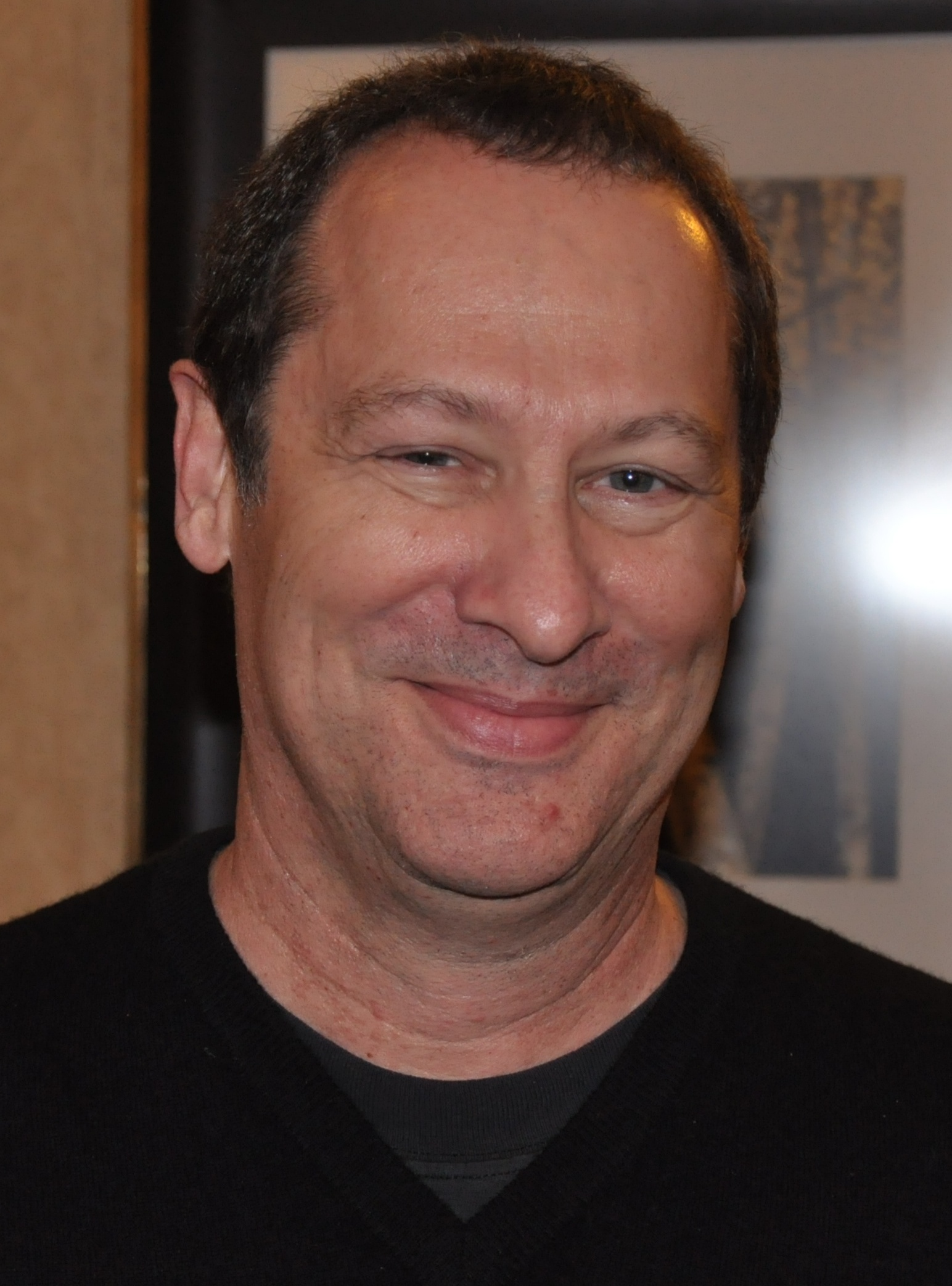
- Martinez in 2012

Background information
- Born: Cliff Robert Martinez; February 5, 1954 (age 72); New York City, New York, U.S.
- Genres: Film score, punk rock, funk rock, experimental rock, synthwave, industrial, ambient
- Occupations: Musician, songwriter
- Instruments: Drums, piano
- Years active: 1970s–present
- Label: EMI
- Formerly of: Red Hot Chili Peppers, The Dickies, Captain Beefheart and the Magic Band, Lydia Lunch, The Weirdos
- Website: cliff-martinez.com

Cliff Robert Martinez (born February 5, 1954) is an American musician and composer. Early in his career, Martinez was known as a drummer notably with the Red Hot Chili Peppers and Captain Beefheart and the Magic Band. Since the 1990s, he has worked primarily as a film score composer, writing music for Spring Breakers (2012), The Foreigner (2017), and multiple films by Steven Soderbergh, Sex, Lies, and Videotape (1989), Solaris (2002), Contagion (2011) and Traffic (2000) and Nicolas Winding Refn, Drive (2011), Only God Forgives (2013), The Neon Demon (2016) and the miniseries Too Old to Die Young (2019).

On April 14, 2012, Martinez was inducted into the Rock and Roll Hall of Fame as a member of the Red Hot Chili Peppers.

== Early life ==
Martinez was born in the Bronx, New York City. His grandfather migrated from a small village in Spain to the United States. Raised in Columbus, Ohio, his first job composing was for the popular television show Pee Wee's Playhouse. At the time, however, he was more interested in rock bands, and played drums in a variety of them, mostly in a temporary capacity.

== Red Hot Chili Peppers (1983–1986) ==
After several years drumming for such acts as Captain Beefheart and the Magic Band, The Dickies, Lydia Lunch and The Weirdos, in late 1983, Martinez and Jack Sherman were drafted in to join the Red Hot Chili Peppers for the recording of their eponymous first album after Jack Irons and Hillel Slovak left the band to concentrate on their other project at the time, What Is This?. Martinez also played on the recording of the band's second album Freaky Styley (1985) and its subsequent tour.

In 2012 Martinez was inducted into the Rock and Roll Hall of Fame as a member of the Red Hot Chili Peppers. Martinez performed with the band for the first time in 26 years when he joined them along with former drummer Jack Irons on their song, "Give It Away" during the ceremony.

== Film composing ==
In the mid 1980's, Martinez' interests shifted and he began to focus his attention toward film scoring. A tape Martinez had put together using new technologies made its rounds, leading him to score an episode of Pee-Wee's Playhouse. The same recording also ended up in Steven Soderbergh's hands and Martinez was hired to score the famed director's first theatrical release, 1989's Sex, Lies, and Videotape. Martinez's longstanding relationship with Soderbergh has continued through the years and they have worked together on ten theatrical releases including Kafka (1991), The Limey (1999), Traffic (2000), Solaris (2002) and 2011's Contagion, as well the Cinemax series The Knick (2014–2015).

His nontraditional scores tend towards being stark and sparse, utilizing a modern tonal palette to paint the backdrop for films that are often dark, psychological stories like Pump Up the Volume (1990), The Limey, Wonderland (2003), Wicker Park (2004) and Drive (2011). Martinez has been nominated for a Grammy Award for Best Score Soundtrack for Visual Media (Steven Soderbergh's Traffic), a César Award for Best Original Music (Xavier Giannoli's In the Beginning (2009)), and a Broadcast Film Critics Award (Drive). He earned a Robert Award for Best Score for his work on Only God Forgives (2013).

Martinez's use of audio manipulations, particularly for percussive sounds, has been evolving through the years and is evident by the hammered dulcimer of Kafka, the gray-areas between sound design and score for Traffic, the steel drums and textures of Solaris, what Martinez called "rhythmi-tizing pitched, ambient textures" of Narc (2002), and "using percussion performances to trigger and shape the rhythmic and tonal characteristics of those ambient textures," as he described his score for 2011's The Lincoln Lawyer.

Martinez served as a juror for the 2012 Sundance Film Festival and served on the International Feature nominating committee for the 27th Independent Spirit Awards in February that same year. Martinez's recent films include Robert Redford's The Company You Keep (2012), Nicholas Jarecki's Arbitrage (2012), Harmony Korine's Spring Breakers (2012) (co-composed with Skrillex), and Nicolas Winding Refn's Only God Forgives and The Neon Demon (2016).

== Video game composing ==
Martinez composed the main menu music titled "Galaxy Theme" for Spore in 2008. In 2014, Martinez also composed the title score for Far Cry 4.

== Advertising ==
In 2013, Martinez scored the "Fly Beyond" Grey Goose vodka commercial. Martinez also composed two songs, "Vibe" and "Kotopulse", for the 2014 Lincoln Motor Company advertising campaign featuring Matthew McConaughey.

== Discography ==
=== The Weirdos ===
- Weird World (compilation)

=== Lydia Lunch ===
- 13.13 (1982)
- Stinkfist (1986)

=== Captain Beefheart and the Magic Band ===
- Ice Cream for Crow (1982)

=== Red Hot Chili Peppers ===
- The Red Hot Chili Peppers (1984)
- Freaky Styley (1985)
- The Abbey Road E.P. – (1988)
- What Hits!? – (1992)
- Out in L.A. – (1994)
- Under the Covers: Essential Red Hot Chili Peppers – (1998)

=== The Dickies ===
- Killer Klowns from Outer Space (1988)
- The Second Coming (1989)
- Locked N' Loaded Live in London (1991)
- Idjit Savant (1994)

=== As composer ===
==== Film ====
Year	Title	Director	Studio(s)	Notes
1989	Sex, Lies, and Videotape	Steven Soderbergh	Miramax Films	—N/a
1990	Pump Up the Volume	Allan Moyle	New Line Cinema	—N/a
1991	Kafka	Steven Soderbergh	Miramax Films	—N/a
1992	Black Magic	Daniel Taplitz	—N/a	—N/a
1993	King of the Hill	Steven Soderbergh	Gramercy Pictures	—N/a
1995	The Underneath	Steven Soderbergh	Gramercy Pictures	—N/a
1996	Gray's Anatomy	Steven Soderbergh	—N/a	—N/a
1996	Schizopolis	Steven Soderbergh	—N/a	Uncredited
1998	Wicked	Michael Steinberg	—N/a	—N/a
1999	The Limey	Steven Soderbergh	Artisan Entertainment	—N/a
2000	Traffic	Steven Soderbergh	USA Films	—N/a
2002	Narc	Joe Carnahan	Paramount Pictures; Lionsgate	—N/a
2002	Solaris	Steven Soderbergh	20th Century Fox	—N/a
2003	Wonderland	James Cox	Lionsgate	—N/a
2004	Wicker Park	Paul McGuigan	Metro-Goldwyn-Mayer	—N/a
2005	Havoc	Barbara Kopple	New Line Cinema	—N/a
2006	First Snow	Mark Fergus	Freestyle Releasing	—N/a
2008	Stiletto	Nick Vallelonga	First Look International	—N/a
2008	Vice	Raul Inglis	—N/a	—N/a
2009	Espion(s)	Nicolas Saada	—N/a	—N/a
2009	Severe Clear	Kristian Fraga	—N/a	Documentary
2009	In the Beginning	Xavier Giannoli	EuropaCorp	—N/a
2011	The Lincoln Lawyer	Brad Furman	Lionsgate	—N/a
2011	Drive	Nicolas Winding Refn	FilmDistrict	—N/a
2011	Contagion	Steven Soderbergh	Warner Bros. Pictures	Additional music by Mac Quayle & Gregory Tripi
2012	Arbitrage	Nicholas Jarecki	Lionsgate	Additional music by Mac Quayle & Gregory Tripi
2012	The Company You Keep	Robert Redford	Sony Pictures Classics	Additional music by Mac Quayle & Gregory Tripi
2013	Spring Breakers	Harmony Korine	A24	Composed with Skrillex; Additional music by Mac Quayle & Gregory Tripi
2013	Golem	Patrick McCue; Tobias Wiesner	—N/a	Short film
2013	Only God Forgives	Nicolas Winding Refn	RADiUS-TWC	—N/a
2014	Mea Culpa	Fred Cavayé	Gaumont	—N/a
2014	My Life Directed by Nicolas Winding Refn	Liv Corfixen	—N/a	Documentary
2014	The Normal Heart	Ryan Murphy	20th Century Fox Television	Television film
2016	The Neon Demon	Nicolas Winding Refn	Gaumont	Additional music by Peter G. Adams & Gregory Tripi
2016	War Dogs	Todd Phillips	Warner Bros. Pictures	Additional music by Peter G. Adams & Gregory Tripi
2017	The Foreigner	Martin Campbell	STX Entertainment	Additional music by Peter G. Adams, Thor Lawae & Gregory Tripi
2018	Den of Thieves	Christian Gudegast	STX Entertainment	Additional music by Peter G. Adams, Thor Lawae & Gregory Tripi
2018	Game Night	John Francis Daley; Jonathan Goldstein	Warner Bros. Pictures; New Line Cinema	Additional music by Peter G. Adams & Thor Lawae
2018	Hotel Artemis	Drew Pearce	Global Road Entertainment	Additional music by Thor Lawae & Gregory Tripi
2022	Kimi	Steven Soderbergh	Warner Bros. Pictures; New Line Cinema	—N/a

==== Television ====
Year	Title	Notes
2014–2017	The Knick	—N/a
2019	Too Old to Die Young	additional music by Peter G. Adams & Thor Lawae
2020–2022	The Wilds	—N/a
2022	Copenhagen Cowboy	—N/a

==== Video games ====
Year	Title	Developer(s)	Publisher(s)	Notes
2008	Spore	Maxis	Electronic Arts	Galaxy Main Theme and other unspecified compositions Composed with Brian Eno
2014	Far Cry 4	Ubisoft Montreal	Ubisoft	Additional music and arrangements by Peter G. Adams, Gregory Tripi, Mac Quayle and Jeff Rona
