= Hillel Slovak =

Israeli-American musician (1962–1988)

Hillel Slovak הלל סלובק
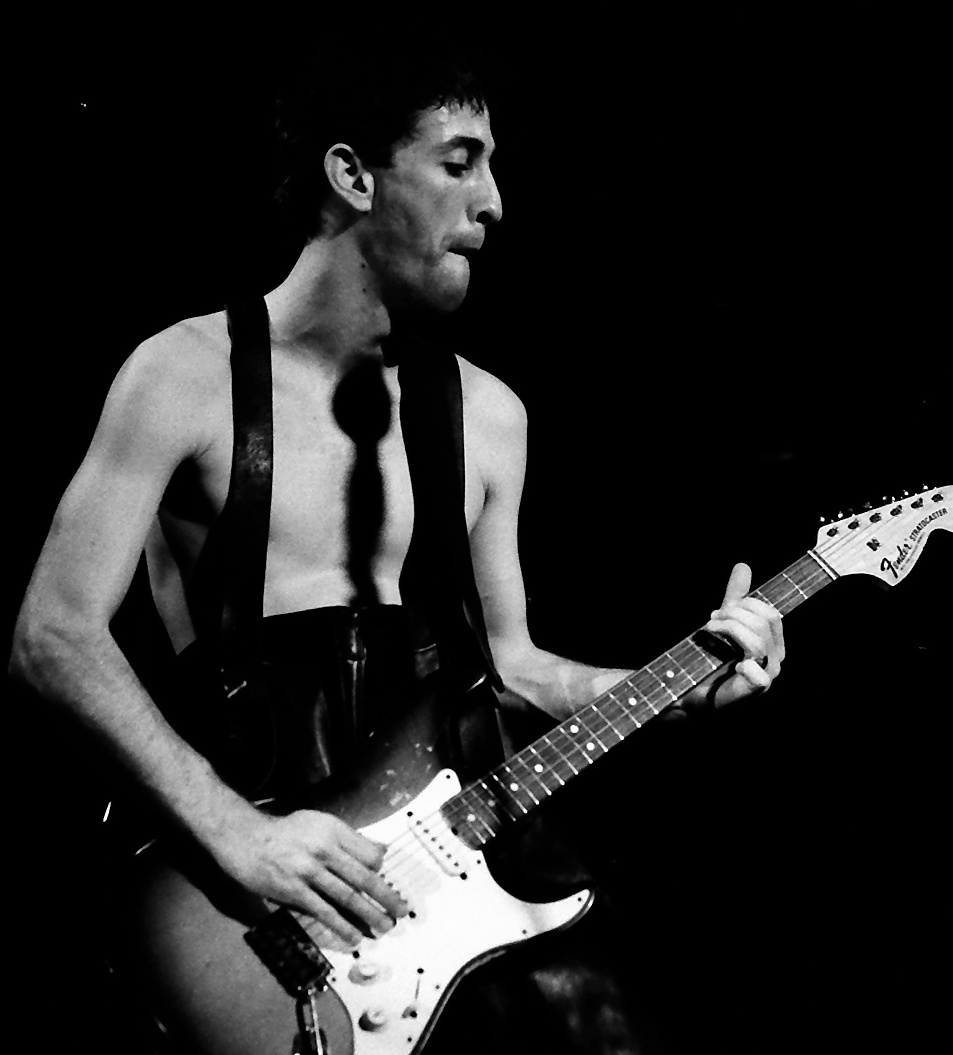
- Slovak performing in Philadelphia in 1985

Background information
- Also known as: Slim, Pick Handle Slim, The Israeli Cowboy, Mr. Huckleberry
- Born: April 13, 1962; Haifa, Israel
- Origin: Los Angeles, California, U.S.
- Died: June 25, 1988 (aged 26) Los Angeles, California, U.S.
- Genres: Funk rock; punk rock; funk metal; alternative rock
- Occupations: Musician; songwriter
- Instruments: Guitar; vocals; sitar
- Years active: 1976–1988
- Labels: MCA; EMI
- Formerly of: Red Hot Chili Peppers; What Is This?

Hillel Slovak (Hebrew: הלל סלובק; April 13, 1962 – June 25, 1988) was an Israeli-American musician, best known as the original guitarist and a founding member of the Los Angeles rock band the Red Hot Chili Peppers, with whom he recorded two albums. His guitar work was rooted in funk and hard rock, and he often experimented with other genres, including reggae and speed metal. He is considered to have been a major influence on the Red Hot Chili Peppers' early sound.

Born in Israel, he later moved to the United States. Slovak met future bandmates Anthony Kiedis, Flea, and Jack Irons while attending Fairfax High School in Los Angeles. There, he formed the group What Is This with Irons, Alain Johannes, and Todd Strassman; Flea later replaced Strassman.

Flea, Kiedis, and Irons founded the Red Hot Chili Peppers in 1983 and Slovak joined shortly thereafter. The band quickly began gaining popularity in Los Angeles through their energetic stage presence and spirited performances. Slovak eventually quit to focus on What is This, which had been signed to a record deal, leaving the Red Hot Chili Peppers to record their 1984 debut album without him, including five songs he co-wrote. Slovak rejoined the Chili Peppers in 1985 and recorded the albums Freaky Styley (1985) and The Uplift Mofo Party Plan (1987) with them.

During his career, Slovak developed a serious heroin addiction. He attempted to rehabilitate several times but died of an overdose on June 25, 1988, at age 26. Several Red Hot Chili Peppers songs have been written as tributes to Slovak, including "Knock Me Down", "Otherside", "My Lovely Man", and "Feasting on the Flowers". In 1999, his brother James published a book, Behind the Sun: The Diary and Art of Hillel Slovak, which features Slovak's diaries and paintings. Slovak was posthumously inducted into the Rock and Roll Hall of Fame as a member of the Red Hot Chili Peppers on April 14, 2012, with his brother James accepting the award on his behalf. A documentary on Slovak's life that was co-produced by Slovak's brother titled The Rise of the Red Hot Chili Peppers: Our Brother, Hillel, debuted on Netflix on March 20, 2026.

== Life and career ==
=== 1962–1980: Early life and Anthym ===
Hillel Slovak was born in Haifa, Israel, to Jewish parents who were survivors of the Holocaust. His mother was originally from Poland while his father grew up in Yugoslavia. The family immigrated to the United States when Slovak was four years old. They initially settled in the Queens borough of New York City before relocating to the Fairfax neighborhood of Los Angeles two years later. As a child, Slovak developed an interest in art, and often spent time painting with his mother, Esther. He attended Laurel Elementary School in West Hollywood and Bancroft Jr. High School in Hollywood, where he met future bandmates Jack Irons and Michael "Flea" Balzary. Slovak received his first guitar at age 13 as a bar mitzvah present, and regularly played the instrument into the late hours of the night. During this time, he was highly influenced by hard rock music such as Jimi Hendrix, Led Zeppelin, and Kiss.

As a freshman at Fairfax High School, Slovak formed a band with Irons on drums and two other high school friends, Alain Johannes and Todd Strassman. They called their band Chain Reaction, then changed the name to Anthem after their first gig. After one of the group's shows, Slovak met audience member Anthony Kiedis, and invited him to his house for a snack. Kiedis later described the experience in his autobiography Scar Tissue: "Within a few minutes of hanging out with Hillel, I sensed that he was absolutely different from most of the people I'd spent time with ... He understood a lot about music, he was a great visual artist, and he had a sense of self and a calm about him that were just riveting." Slovak, Kiedis and Flea became best friends and often used LSD, heroin, cocaine and methamphetamine recreationally.

The original bassist for Anthem, which renamed to Anthym, was deemed unsatisfactory, so Slovak began teaching Flea to play bass. Following several months of commitment to the instrument, Flea developed proficiency and a strong musical chemistry with Slovak. When Strassman saw Flea playing Anthym songs on his equipment he quit the band, with Flea quickly replacing him. Shortly afterwards Anthym entered a local Battle of the Bands contest and won second place. Anthym started to play at local nightclubs, despite the fact that the members were all underage. After graduating from high school, the band changed their name to What Is This. Around the same time, Flea left the band to accept an offer to play bass in the prominent L.A. punk band Fear. What Is This continued on and performed many shows along the California coast.

=== 1980–1982: Red Hot Chili Peppers formation ===
Slovak, Kiedis, and Flea began to create their own music after finding inspiration in a punk-funk fusion band called Defunkt. The three formed a band with What Is This drummer Jack Irons called Tony Flow and the Miraculously Majestic Masters of Mayhem. The band had only one song, titled "Out in L.A.", and was formed for the purpose of playing the song once. The song was based on a guitar riff that Slovak wrote while "jamming" with Irons, and was not meant to become a real song until Kiedis decided to rap over the music. Following the group's first show at The Rhythm Lounge, the owner of the bar asked them to return, but with two songs instead of one. After several more shows, and the addition of several songs to their repertoire, the band's name was changed to Red Hot Chili Peppers.

After the band started to gain popularity amongst the L.A. club scene, Kiedis began writing more lyrics. The lyrics would eventually become songs such as "Green Heaven" and "True Men Don't Kill Coyotes", and the band's concert repertoire quickly grew to nine songs as a result of months of playing local nightclubs and bars. Over the course of the next six months, the Red Hot Chili Peppers played many shows in L.A. clubs and became something of an underground hit. Slovak, Kiedis, and Flea moved into a small house in a high-crime area in Hollywood where they collaborated musically and continued their drug addictions. The threesome traveled to New York City to perform more shows and to "spread Chili Pepperdom". Shortly after the trip, Slovak moved out of the group's shared house to live with his girlfriend.

=== 1982–1988: What is This? stint, Freaky Styley, and The Uplift Mofo Party Plan ===
The Red Hot Chili Peppers entered Bijou Studios to record a demo tape and subsequently secured a record deal with EMI. Flea left Fear to pursue the Red Hot Chili Peppers. At the same time, What Is This had also gotten a record deal. Since Slovak and Irons considered the Chili Peppers to be merely a side project and not a serious commitment, they left the Peppers to concentrate on What Is This?. Flea ultimately respected the decision, but felt the band would suffer musically without him and Irons. He and Kiedis hired drummer Cliff Martinez and guitarist Jack Sherman to fill Irons' and Slovak's places, respectively. During the recording of the second What Is This album, Slovak became frustrated with the band and contacted Flea about rejoining the Red Hot Chili Peppers. This came at an opportune time, as the group was dissatisfied with Slovak's replacement, Jack Sherman. Kiedis felt that Sherman's guitar work "didn't have the same spirit" that Slovak contributed to the band's sound. When Flea asked Kiedis how he felt about Slovak rejoining the band, Kiedis responded by saying, "I'd give my firstborn son to get him back in the band." After the culmination of the promotional tour for their first album, Sherman was fired and Slovak rejoined the band.

Slovak returned to the Chili Peppers for their second album, Freaky Styley, which was released on August 16, 1985. What Is This had finally disbanded, and Irons returned to the Chili Peppers in mid 1986 after Martinez was fired. The relationship among Flea, Slovak and Kiedis began to deteriorate as a result of excessive heavy drug use and addiction. Flea recalled that "it began to seem ugly to me and not fun; our communication was not healthy". Kiedis became dependent on heroin, leaving the rest of the group to work on much of the album's material by themselves. The band lived in Detroit for a portion of the recording of the album, where Kiedis and Slovak indulged in heavy cocaine use. When Slovak was under the influence, he would often wear brightly colored clothing and dance in a "shuffling" fashion, which became the inspiration for the song "Skinny Sweaty Man" from the band's next album. After Kiedis completed a stint in rehab, he rejoined the Red Hot Chili Peppers in Los Angeles to record their third album The Uplift Mofo Party Plan. Slovak felt a deep connection to the album; he reflected in his diary "It was so fun. I'm so extremely proud of everybody's work—it is at times genius." Slovak was the subject of the songs "Skinny Sweaty Man", "Me and My Friends", & "No Chump Love Sucker". He was nicknamed "Slim Bob Billy", "Slim", or "Huckleberry", and throughout the albums Kiedis calls him by these nicknames before he starts a guitar solo. On The Uplift Mofo Party Plan, Slovak experimented with different musical styles, playing the sitar on the song "Behind the Sun".

== Health decline ==
Slovak and Kiedis became addicted to heroin early on in their careers, and Slovak often attempted to conceal his addiction from his friends and family. At first, the band were more concerned about Kiedis' addiction, which had become more apparent to the other members due to his willingness to openly discuss his issues. Kiedis was more upfront about his problems while Slovak, according to Kiedis, was "much more subtle and much more cunning in his disguise." During the tour in support of Freaky Styley, Slovak's health began to deteriorate. Slovak and Flea would wrestle regularly on tour, but Slovak became too weak to participate. Kiedis commented on the situation: "I could tell that Hillel had no inner core of strength; he had been robbed by his addiction of the life force that allows you to at least defend yourself. It was a sad moment." A roadie of the band who was concerned for Slovak's health contacted his brother, James, who had been unaware that Slovak had ever used heroin.

Deciding to give sobriety a chance, both Kiedis and Slovak stopped using drugs prior to their European tour in support of The Uplift Mofo Party Plan, and decided to help each other "steer clear" of heroin. An entry from Slovak's diary on January 21, 1988, discusses his attempts to "begin a new drug-free phase of life". During the tour both experienced intense heroin withdrawal, with Slovak much more unstable than Kiedis. His withdrawal symptoms took a toll on his ability to play his instrument; at one point Slovak had a mental breakdown and was unable to play a show, leaving the rest of the band to play an entire set with no guitar. He recovered a few days later, but was briefly kicked out of the band and replaced by DeWayne McKnight for a few shows. After a few days with McKnight, the band decided to give Slovak another chance, and he rejoined for the European leg of the tour. Kiedis attempted to take Slovak to drug addiction counseling, but Slovak had difficulty admitting that his addiction was serious enough to require medical help.

== Death ==
Hillel was a huge influence on my life. Were it not for him, I would never had begun to play the bass ... Hillel is always with me and my love for him only grows stronger with time.

— Flea on Slovak's death

Upon returning home, Slovak isolated himself from the rest of his bandmates, and struggled to resist drug abuse without the support of his friends, and Kiedis in particular. He stopped painting and writing in his diary during this time, and little is known about his life during the weeks following the tour, aside from a phone call to his brother on June 24, in which Slovak told him that he was having difficulty staying clean despite his desire to stop taking heroin. A few weeks after the band returned from the tour, the members attempted to contact Slovak, but were unable to do so for several days. On June 27, 1988, Slovak's body was found slumped over the painting he had been working on at the time of his death, with his body holding a cigarette that had burnt a hole in the canvas of the painting. The autopsy revealed that Slovak had died in his Hollywood apartment on June 25, and his body was not discovered until two days later. Authorities confirmed that the official cause of death was an overdose of heroin. He is interred at Mount Sinai Memorial Park Cemetery in Hollywood Hills, California.

Following Slovak's death, Kiedis fled town and did not attend the funeral, considering the situation to be surreal. Although he found the death to be a shock, he was not initially "scared straight" and continued to use heroin. However, a few weeks later, a friend convinced him to both check into rehab and to visit Slovak's grave, which inspired him to get clean. Irons was unable to cope with Slovak's death and subsequently left the band, saying that he did not want to be part of something that resulted in the death of his friends. This did not end Irons' musical career, however, as he would work with Johannes on several projects, including the band Eleven, and would join Pearl Jam for a period in the 1990s after initially declining to join the band upon its founding. Kiedis and Flea decided to continue making music, hoping to continue what Slovak "helped build". They hired McKnight and D.H. Peligro as replacements, who were later replaced by John Frusciante and Chad Smith.

== Musical style and legacy ==
Red Hot Chili Peppers "Behind the Sun" (1987)
This song was heavily influenced by Slovak's "sultry" guitar sound. The guitarist's melodic riff forms the basis of the song, and Slovak's sitar playing can be heard during the verses.

Slovak was primarily influenced by hard rock artists such as Jimi Hendrix, Santana, and Led Zeppelin. His playing method was markedly based on improvisation, a style commonly used in funk music. It has also been noted that he would often play with such force that his fingers would "come apart." Kiedis observed that his playing evolved during his time away from the group in What Is This, with Slovak adopting a more fluid style featuring "sultry" elements as opposed to his original hard rock techniques. On Uplift, Slovak experimented with genres outside of traditional funk music including reggae and speed metal. His guitar riffs would often serve as the basis of the group's songs, with the other members writing their parts to complement his guitar work. His melodic riff featured in the song "Behind the Sun" inspired the group to create "pretty" songs with an emphasis on melody. Kiedis describes the song as "pure Hillel inspiration". Slovak also used a talk box on songs such as "Green Heaven" and "Funky Crime", in which the sounds of his amplified guitar would be played through a tube into his mouth and then back into a microphone, creating psychedelic, voice-like effects. Slovak helped to incorporate new sounds in the group's work, including adding occasional drum machines. Despite the fact that the group billed itself as "The Organic Anti-Beat Box Band", Kiedis states that Slovak showed the group that drum machines could be used as artistic instruments.

Slovak's work was one of the major contributing factors to Red Hot Chili Peppers' early sound. When Kiedis and Flea were searching for a new guitarist to replace Slovak, Kiedis likened the experience to "shopping for a new Mom and Dad" because of his influence over the band. Flea, who originally listened exclusively to jazz, added that Slovak introduced him to a new genre of music, saying that "it was Hillel who first got me into hard rockin'". He was also a huge influence on a young John Frusciante, who would later replace him as guitarist in the band. Frusciante based a lot of his playing style on Slovak's work, and explained, "I learned everything I needed to know about how to sound good with Flea by studying Hillel's playing and I just took it sideways from there." Just like Slovak before him, Frusciante developed a heroin addiction. Unlike Slovak, Frusciante eventually managed to break and defeat the habit. The songs "Knock Me Down" (from Mother's Milk), "My Lovely Man" (from Blood Sugar Sex Magik), "This is the Place" (from By the Way), and "Feasting on the Flowers" (from The Getaway) were written about or as tributes to Slovak. The title of the song "Otherside" (from Californication) is also a tribute to Slovak. The band's 1987 cover version of Jimi Hendrix's song "Fire", recorded with Slovak and previously only released on the "Fight Like a Brave" single and The Abbey Road EP, was included on 1989's Mother's Milk along with an image of one of Slovak's paintings inside the album's booklet. In 1999, a book titled Behind the Sun: The Diary and Art of Hillel Slovak was published. The book was authored by Slovak's brother, James Slovak, and features writings from his brother's diaries, paintings, photos and hand-written notes from Kiedis and Flea.

On December 7, 2011, Red Hot Chili Peppers were announced as 2012 inductees to the Rock and Roll Hall of Fame. Slovak's brother James accepted the award on his behalf and gave a speech honoring his brother. In an interview with Rolling Stone, Kiedis expressed his excitement with Slovak's induction, explaining "He's a beautiful person that picked up a guitar in the 1970s and didn't make it out of the 1980s, and he is getting honored for his beauty". Flea echoed those comments on the same day: "Hillel grew up loving rock and roll so much, he hasn't been here for some time, but I know how much it would mean to him. It's a powerful thing."

=== The Rise of the Red Hot Chili Peppers: Our Brother, Hillel documentary ===
On May 16, 2025, it was reported by Deadline that a documentary on the band's formative years was being secretly screened at the Cannes Film Festival and was looking for select buyers in both New York and Los Angeles. The documentary, co-produced by Hillel's brother James, centers on the deep childhood bond between Anthony Kiedis, Flea, and Hillel, and features interviews from current and past band members. On March 20, 2026, Netflix aired the Ben Feldman directed and James Slovak co-produced documentary The Rise of the Red Hot Chili Peppers: Our Brother Hillel.

Following the announcement of the documentary, the Red Hot Chili Peppers issued a statement that the documentary was wrongly being promoted as a band documentary but wanted to clarify that it was about Slovak. "About a year ago, we were asked to be interviewed for a documentary about Hillel Slovak. He was a founding member of the group, a great guitarist, and friend. We agreed to be interviewed out of love and respect for Hillel and his memory. However, this documentary is now being advertised as a Red Hot Chili Peppers documentary, which it is not. We had nothing to do with it creatively. We have yet to make a Red Hot Chili Peppers documentary. The central subject of this current Netflix special is Hillel Slovak and we hope it sparks interest in him and his work.”

Anthony Kiedis, Flea, Jack Irons, John Frusciante, Alain Johannes, James Slovak, George Clinton, Addie Brik & Gary Allen were interviewed for the documentary. The film included parts of a previously unreleased TV-show featuring "Anthym" — the only known footage of the band with Flea on bass, along with archival footage of the "Freaky Styley" sessions & the "MusiCalifornia" show. Unseen footage from the band's debut European tour was discovered and widely used after the documentary's archival researcher, Max Elfimov, asked VPRO director Bram Van Splunteren to share a copy of "Europe By Storm" without subtitles.

The documentary features Slovak's AI-reconstructed voice reading excerpts from a published copy of his journals that Feldman had come across and felt moved by. Feldman decided having the journals read in Slovak's own voice was "a critical way to make his [words] feel alive” and was granted permission by Slovak's family to recreate his voice via AI.

== Discography ==
With Addie Brik

- Wattsland – EP – (1984)

With What Is This

- Squeezed – EP – (1984)
- What Is This? – (1985)
- 3 Out Of 5 Live – EP – (1985)

With Red Hot Chili Peppers

- The Red Hot Chili Peppers – (1984)
  - Co-wrote "Get Up and Jump", "Green Heaven", "Baby Appeal", "Out in L.A.", and "Police Helicopter"
- Freaky Styley – (1985)
- The Uplift Mofo Party Plan – (1987)
- The Abbey Road E.P. – (1988)
- Mother's Milk – (1989)
  - Performs on only one track, "Fire"
- What Hits!? – (1992)
- Out in L.A. – (1994)
- Under the Covers: Essential Red Hot Chili Peppers – (1998)
- The Best of Red Hot Chili Peppers – (1994)
