= Jack Sherman =

American guitarist (1956–2020)

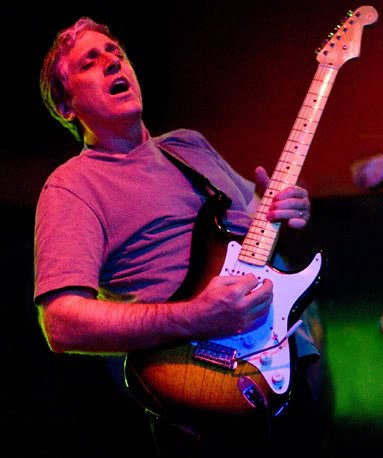
- Sherman performing live in 2010

Background information
- Born: January 18, 1956; Miami, Florida, U.S.
- Died: August 18, 2020 (aged 64) Savannah, Georgia, U.S.
- Occupation: Musician
- Instrument: Guitar
- Formerly of: Red Hot Chili Peppers

Jack Morris Sherman (January 18, 1956 – August 18, 2020) was an American guitarist, best known as the second guitarist for the Red Hot Chili Peppers, between Hillel Slovak's departure and return. He played on the band's debut album, and co-wrote much of their second album, Freaky Styley. He went on to collaborate with musicians Bob Dylan, George Clinton, Feargal Sharkey, and Peter Case.

== Life and career ==
Sherman was born in Miami, Florida, on January 18, 1956. In childhood, Sherman and his family moved first to New York, then to California. At the age of 8, he saw the performance of the Beatles at The Ed Sullivan Show, became fanatically interested in the work of the Liverpool band, and learned to play guitar. Two years later, he traded a worn-out Beatles disc for a new album by the Rolling Stones and increased his involvement in rock music. In San Diego, he began playing in the groups Funky Demon, Pagan Tumor, Boilerhouse, Redemption, and Search.

He joined the rock band Red Hot Chili Peppers in December 1983, after the original guitar player Hillel Slovak left the band. Sherman would remain with the band for their first tour in 1984 to support the release of their first album, The Red Hot Chili Peppers. This turned out to be the only album on which he would act as guitarist.

In early March 1984, the group with Sherman filmed their debut television appearance on Thicke of the Night hosted by Alan Thicke. This aired on March 16, 1984, where the group energetically performed a new composition "True Men Don’t Kill Coyotes", and the already proven concert number "Get Up and Jump".

Sherman played all the shows with The Red Hot Chili Peppers from January 1984 to February 1985. Their first show with him was on January 19, 1984, at the Music Machine. The last show was on February 16, 1985, at Jed’s Showcase.

Sherman would co-write half of the songs on the band's second album, Freaky Styley, but when Slovak requested to return to the band in early 1985, Sherman was fired before recording commenced. In spite of this, he later provided the backing vocals to two songs on the band's 1989 album, Mother's Milk.

He subsequently collaborated with Bob Dylan in Knocked Out Loaded, funk musician George Clinton in R&B Skeletons in the Closet, as well as Feargal Sharkey and Peter Case.

When the Chili Peppers were inducted into the Rock and Roll Hall of Fame in 2012, neither Sherman nor their former guitarist Dave Navarro, who had each played guitar on one of the band's albums, were inducted. Sherman blamed the band's members for the omission, saying that it ignored the work that they had put in having "soldiered on under arduous conditions".

Anthony Kiedis, the lead vocalist of Red Hot Chili Peppers, wrote in his 2004 autobiography, Scar Tissue, that the band understood its relationship with Sherman to be transient because he did not possess "a punk-rock pedigree". However, he acknowledged the important part Sherman played in keeping the band afloat.

== Death ==
Sherman died on August 18, 2020, at the age of 64 of a heart attack at his home in Savannah, Georgia. The Red Hot Chili Peppers issued a statement on his death thanking him for "all times good, bad and in between". Red Hot Chili Peppers' bassist Flea would post his own personal tribute to Sherman on Instagram nearly a month later, saying that while their relationship was "complicated", he cited Sherman as an influence on his music and his life saying he "played the most wicked guitar part on our song 'Mommy Where’s Daddy', a thing that influenced the way I heard rhythm forever. He taught me about diet, to eat clean and be conscious of my body. But more than anything, he was my friend. We came from very different backgrounds, had different world views, and it was hard for us to relate to one another often. But the excitement we shared over music, and the joy that bubbled up between us will last forever. Rest In Peace Sherm I love you."

== Partial discography ==
- 1984 The Red Hot Chili Peppers — Red Hot Chili Peppers
- 1985 Freaky Styley — Red Hot Chili Peppers (co-wrote half the album however did not perform on it)
- 1986 Knocked Out Loaded — Bob Dylan
- 1986 R&B Skeletons in the Closet — George Clinton
- 1986 Echo Park soundtrack
- 1988 Notes from the Lost Civilization — Tonio K
- 1988 Wish — Feargal Sharkey
- 1988 The Abbey Road E.P. — Red Hot Chili Peppers
- 1989 Mother's Milk — Red Hot Chili Peppers (backing vocals on two songs)
- 1989 The Man with the Blue Post-Modern Fragmented Neo-Traditionalist Guitar — Peter Case
- 1990 Soundtrack of My Life — Kimm Rogers
- 1990 Flashback soundtrack
- 1992 What Hits!? — Red Hot Chili Peppers
- 1995 Chillin' In Hades - Bill Madden
- 1996 Backroom Blood — Gerry Goffin
- 1997 Olé — Tonio K
- 1998 Under the Covers: Essential Red Hot Chili Peppers — Red Hot Chili Peppers
- 2000 In from the Cold — In From The Cold — original music with Gary Mallaber and Maria Sebastian
- 2007 Luke Mitchell — High Expectations
- 2010 Eric Culberson — In The Outside
- 2011 Luke Mitchell — Row Boat Row
- 2013 Matthew Wesley — REAL
