= Scar Tissue (autobiography) =

Memoir by Anthony Kiedis

- Author: Anthony Kiedis; Larry Sloman
- Language: English
- Genre: Memoir
- Publisher: Hyperion
- Publication date: October 6, 2004
- Publication place: United States
- Media type: Hardcover; Paperback; Audiobook; E-book
- Pages: 480 (hardcover edition); 465 (paperback edition)
- ISBN: 1-4013-0101-0
- OCLC: 56520621
- Dewey Decimal: 782.42166/092 B 22
- LC Class: ML420.K44 A3 2004

Scar Tissue is the autobiography of Red Hot Chili Peppers vocalist Anthony Kiedis. It was released in 2004 by Hyperion and authored by Kiedis with Larry Sloman, who compiled information and conducted interviews. The book reached No. 1 on The New York Times Best Seller List. An audiobook version, read by actor Rider Strong, was released by Phoenix Audio on June 30, 2006. An E-book version is also available.

== Background ==
The book follows Kiedis's life from his birth in 1962 to early 2004. It follows Kiedis into the depth of his experiences with drug addiction. The title name was taken from the single "Scar Tissue" released five years earlier on the Red Hot Chili Peppers album Californication.

According to the book, Kiedis's first drug experience was with his father Blackie Dammett, a former drug dealer, at age eleven. By the time his band formed and became more popular in the 1980s, he and former bandmate Hillel Slovak had severe drug addictions. On Slovak's death from overdose in 1988, Kiedis writes that he was so shaken that he skipped town, missing the funeral. Kiedis had no idea what to do without his friend. His death only made matters worse and caused him to do more and more hardcore drugs.

He attempted to get clean afterwards but relapsed in 1994 after being given medications while having wisdom teeth extracted. Later, he reveals that he was not actually clean, as he claimed at the time, during the late-nineties Californication era of the band's existence. He states his new clean date is December 24, 2000. The book reports very specific dates, such as when Kiedis was conceived.

Scar Tissue also recounts many of Kiedis's sexual experiences. He acknowledges, for example, that he was briefly sexually involved with a 14-year-old, before and after learning of her age in the 1980s, which inspired him to write the song "Catholic School Girls Rule".

In a June 2016 interview, Kiedis stated he had regrets about writing Scar Tissue, saying "I did regret the book for a while as there was some pain caused then, I started seeing the long term positive reverberating. People were reading it in hospitals, in prisons and schools and it was having a positive effect. I realized that the whole point of writing that book wasn't for me, but to show that somebody can go all the way down and come all the way back and have a productive, successful happy interesting life. And so whatever shame, pain or difficulty or discomfort I went through, then it was worth it because I get so many people coming up to me saying their kids had read it and got their act together because of it."

== Reception ==
John Harris of The Guardian believed that the autobiography showed Kiedis to have "hubris, selfishness, the large-scale absence of any sense of humour" as well as "irreparable damage" from his childhood of drug use and sexual experiences. He was also not convinced by Kiedis's attempts at gravitas.

In 2020, Rob Sheffield of Rolling Stone Australia listed Scar Tissue as the 15th greatest rock memoir. He reflected that it had the best final sentence on the list, as Kiedis reflects that he stays sober for his dog.

== Television series and film ==
In 2008, it was reported that Kiedis was developing a television series for HBO titled Spider and Son which would be loosely based on Scar Tissue. The show was originally scheduled to premiere in late 2010 but was not picked up as a series, despite a pilot script penned by John Sayles.

In 2011, the rights to the show were picked up by FX and it was stated that Entourage producers Marc Abrams and Mike Benson will produce the series. The series was expected to follow the first half of Kiedis's book during his pre teen and teenage years and his relationship with his father Blackie Dammett. Dammett's autobiography, Lords of the Sunset Strip, would also be used as a source for the series. Dammett confirmed in 2013 that the production of the series had been "mothballed", however he hoped they could re-visit the project in once the Chili Peppers finished their I'm with You World Tour that same year. As of 2024, the series has yet to resume production.

It was announced on January 17, 2024, that Universal Pictures will release a theatrical movie based on Scar Tissue. Kiedis along with Guy Oseary and Brian Grazer will produce the film.
