= Freaky Styley =

Studio album by Red Hot Chili Peppers
- Released: August 16, 1985
- Recorded: May 1985
- Studio: United (Detroit)
- Genres: Funk rock; funk; psychedelic funk; dance-rock
- Length: 39:50
- Label: EMI America
- Producer: George Clinton

Red Hot Chili Peppers chronology
The Red Hot Chili Peppers (1984)	Freaky Styley (1985)	The Uplift Mofo Party Plan (1987)

Singles from Freaky Styley
- 1. "Jungle Man" Released: 1985; 2. "Hollywood (Africa)" Released: 1985

Freaky Styley is the second studio album by American rock band Red Hot Chili Peppers, released on August 16, 1985, through EMI America Records. Freaky Styley marks founding guitarist Hillel Slovak's studio album debut, following his return to the band earlier in the year. The album is the last to feature drummer Cliff Martinez. Freaky Styley was produced by George Clinton, of Parliament-Funkadelic, and the sessions benefitted from Clinton's chemistry during recording.

The music on the record draws influence from funk, punk rock, and psychedelic rock, while the lyrical content was inspired by the band members' lives in Hollywood. "Jungle Man" and "Hollywood (Africa)" were released as promotional singles while "Catholic School Girls Rule" and "Jungle Man" had music videos made for them. Critics viewed the album as an improvement upon the band's debut album, praising Freaky Styley's musical experimentation and production. However, it did not achieve mainstream success and failed to enter the Billboard 200. The band embarked on the Infinity Tour to promote the album.

== Background ==
Red Hot Chili Peppers were formed in 1982 in Los Angeles by Fairfax High School alumni, vocalist Anthony Kiedis, guitarist Hillel Slovak, bassist Flea, and drummer Jack Irons. Originally named Tony Flow & the Miraculously Majestic Masters of Mayhem, the group was originally meant as a one-off band for playing only one show. However, after a positive crowd reception, the band changed its name to Red Hot Chili Peppers. The group was noticed by EMI, and the band signed with the record label. Slovak and Irons still considered the Peppers a side project, so they quit to focus on their band What Is This?; that group had signed a record contract two weeks earlier. Kiedis and Flea subsequently recruited guitarist Jack Sherman and drummer Cliff Martinez to complete the band's lineup for its self-titled debut album. The band was disappointed in the album's overall sound, thinking it was overly polished, as if it had "gone through a sterilizing Goody Two-shoes machine".

During the tour in support of the band's first album, continuing musical and lifestyle tension between Kiedis and Sherman complicated the transition between concert and daily band life. Sherman was fired soon after, with Slovak returning to the Chili Peppers after growing tired of What is This?. Because the Peppers did not have a positive experience working with Andy Gill on their previous record, they began searching for a new producer for their next album. The first potential producer the band worked with was Malcolm McLaren, who had worked with the Sex Pistols and Bow Wow Wow. However, McLaren suggested they changed their style to play more simplified, 1950s-style rock and roll and make Kiedis the central character, a change the group vehemently opposed. After receiving comparisons from fans to Parliament-Funkadelic, the band indicated to EMI Records its desire to work with frontman George Clinton. The band contacted Clinton and sent him their debut album and demo tapes, and Flea and the band's manager, Lindy, traveled to Detroit to meet him. Clinton agreed to work with the band, and EMI paid him $25,000 to produce the album. The song "Blackeyed Blonde" was performed by the band in the 1985 skateboarding movie Thrashin' starring Josh Brolin.

== Recording ==
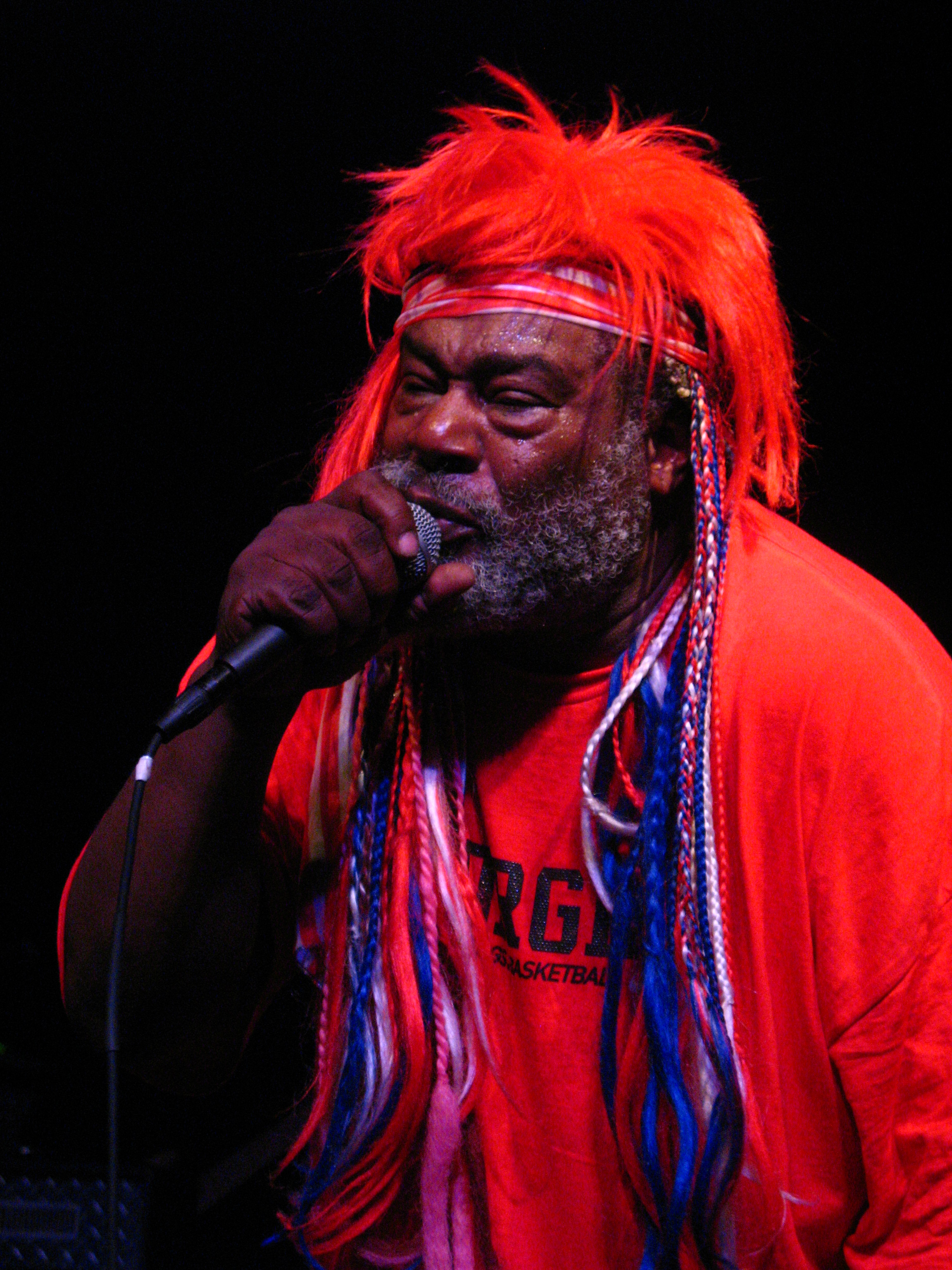
The band felt a strong chemistry with producer George Clinton (pictured in 2007).

The band had already written approximately 70 percent of the album (mostly with Sherman, not Slovak) by the time the group traveled to Michigan to record the album. Clinton decided that the band would spend a month with him before recording to bond and create ideas for new songs. Before renting a house of their own, the group members stayed in Clinton's house in the village of Brooklyn, about an hour away from Detroit, for a week. The band was excited to live with Clinton, but as soon as Kiedis moved in, he began experiencing severe heroin withdrawal, and became very ill. He attempted to offset his desire for heroin by using cocaine instead, but his relief was short-lived. After a few days, however, his symptoms subsided and he was able to join the group in playing music and connecting with Clinton. The Red Hot Chili Peppers felt a strong chemistry with Clinton and enjoyed his quirky personality and storytelling abilities. After a week of living with him, the band moved into a house on a nearby golf course.

Freaky Styley was recorded at United Sound Studios in Detroit. Martinez recalled that "George had a party atmosphere in the studio all the time, but a productive party atmosphere. You took care of business, but he made sure you had a lot of fun doing it." The band and Clinton began using copious amounts of cocaine together, which had a negative effect on the band's overall health. When the time came for Kiedis to record his vocals, he decided to abstain from cocaine use for two weeks, an experience he likened to "deciding to be celibate when you're living in a brothel." The track "Yertle the Turtle" incorporates several verses directly from Dr. Seuss' poem also named "Yertle the Turtle." As stated by Kiedis in his autobiography, Scar Tissue, the spoken lyrics at the beginning and throughout the song saying "Look at that turtle go bro," were by George Clinton's drug dealer who demanded debts be paid by Clinton. Unable to repay the dealer, Clinton offered him a part in the album.

== Composition ==
According to Jason Birchmeier of AllMusic, Freaky Styley is "the closest the Red Hot Chili Peppers ever came to straight funk." The album marks the return of guitarist Hillel Slovak, and Kiedis observed that Slovak's playing evolved during his time away from the group in What Is This?, with the guitarist adopting a more fluid style featuring "sultry" elements as opposed to his original hard rock techniques. The band also experimented with a more diverse variety of musical genres on Freaky Styley. "Jungle Man" contains psychedelic rock-styled guitar, layered background vocals, and an "urgent, aggressive dance beat". "Catholic School Girls Rule" draws influence from punk rock music, while "Blackeyed Blonde" has been described as "Aerosmith meets Isaac Hayes". The album features covers of "If You Want Me to Stay" by Sly and the Family Stone, and "Africa" by The Meters. Clinton helped with the vocal arrangements and provided his own vocals for a portion of "Hollywood (Africa)". Trouser Press opined that the album was "more outrageous" than the group's debut but "easier to swallow as utilitarian dance-rock".

"Catholic School Girls Rule" was inspired by a sexual encounter Kiedis had with a fourteen-year-old Catholic school student in New Orleans while on tour in 1984. "Jungle Man" was dedicated to Flea, whom Kiedis used to create a fictionalized persona of "this half-man, half-beast born in the belly of the volcano in Australia coming to the world and using his thumb as the conductor of thunder on the bass." The lyrics of the band's cover of "Africa" by The Meters differ slightly from the original, intended to reflect the group's hometown of Hollywood. At the time, Flea listened repeatedly to the Meters and wanted to cover one of the group's songs, and Clinton suggested that the group use the opportunity to dedicate a song to Hollywood, saying, "What if you did the song 'Africa' but had Anthony do a rewrite so it's no longer 'Africa', but it's your 'Africa', which is Hollywood?"

== Artwork ==
The cover artwork features the band jumping in front of Michelangelo's The Last Judgment.

== Critical reception ==
Professional ratings
Review scores
Source	Rating
AllMusic	4/5 stars
Encyclopedia of Popular Music	3/5 stars
MusicHound Rock	3/5
The Rolling Stone Album Guide	2/5 stars
Select	4/5 medals
Spin Alternative Record Guide	7/10

Freaky Styley did not garner mainstream success and failed to enter the Billboard 200. In the liner notes to the 2003 remastered edition of the album, bassist Flea states:

I know the music on this record was just way too obscure to ever be popular in a mainstream kind of way, but to me it really holds its own as a definitive and substantial musical statement. More than any other record we ever made it falls into the category of "too funky for white radio, too punk rockin' for black." Of course, the songs were very far away from any pop format; I realise it is/was not just the racial segregation at radio that precluded it from being a popular record.

However, the album was more positively received by critics than the band's debut album. Jason Birchmeier of AllMusic felt that Clinton's production helped to make Freaky Styley an improvement over The Red Hot Chili Peppers, and enjoyed Slovak's return, noting that the guitarist "makes a major contribution to practically every song". He further wrote that "the Peppers have a good clutch of songs to work with in addition to excellent production. And too, they seem relaxed and at ease here, playing quirky songs without any self-consciousness, a quality lacking on their debut." Ira Robbins of Rolling Stone called the album "wilder, rougher, funnier and funkier" than The Red Hot Chili Peppers, and opined that "the Chili Peppers are taking advantage of the current crossover free-for-all to universalize funk by expanding its limits and incorporating new ingredients without diluting the basic bump. Fed up with the empty calories of effete high-tech dance records? Freaky Styley is stick-to-the-ribs rock that puts meat back in the motion." Greg Kot was more critical in The Rolling Stone Album Guide (2004), believing that like the group's debut album, Freaky Styley had "not a single memorable song" while the band's "funk-monkey shtick camouflaged serious musical deficiencies".

== Tour and Jack Irons return ==
The tour for Freaky Styley known as the Infinity Tour began in 1985. Both Kiedis and Slovak were beginning their long (and in Slovak's case soon to be fatal) battles with drugs on this tour. The band decided to begin recording their third album in the spring of 1986 but by this time drummer Cliff Martinez decided he just didn't have the heart to continue, though rather than quitting, Kiedis and Flea fired Martinez. To the band's amazement, founding drummer Jack Irons decided to return and for the first time since 1983 the original lineup was together. Together, the reunited lineup finished the remainder of the Freaky Styley tour. Following the end of the tour, Kiedis's drug problems were so bad that he was briefly fired from the band.

== Track listing ==
All tracks written by Anthony Kiedis, Flea, Jack Sherman, and Cliff Martinez unless otherwise noted.

Side one
No.	Title	Writer(s)	Length
1.	"Jungle Man"		4:08
2.	"Hollywood (Africa)" (The Meters cover)	Ziggy Modeliste; Art Neville; Leo Nocentelli; George Porter Jr.	5:03
3.	"American Ghost Dance"		3:51
4.	"If You Want Me to Stay" (Sly & the Family Stone cover)	Sylvester Stewart	4:06
5.	"Nevermind"	Kiedis; Flea; Hillel Slovak; Jack Irons	2:47

Side two
No.	Title	Writer(s)	Length
1.	"Freaky Styley"		3:39
2.	"Blackeyed Blonde"		2:40
3.	"The Brothers Cup"	Kiedis; Flea; Slovak; Irons	3:26
4.	"Battleship"		1:53
5.	"Lovin' and Touchin'"		0:36
6.	"Catholic School Girls Rule"		1:55
7.	"Sex Rap"	Kiedis; Flea; Slovak; Irons	1:54
8.	"Thirty Dirty Birds"		0:14
9.	"Yertle the Turtle"	Theodor Geisel	3:38
Total length:			39:50

Bonus tracks on 2003 remastered CD version
No.	Title	Length
15.	"Nevermind" (demo)	2:17
16.	"Sex Rap" (demo)	1:37
17.	"Freaky Styley" (original long version)	8:49
18.	"Millionaires Against Hunger"	3:26
Total length:		55:59

== Personnel ==
Red Hot Chili Peppers

- Anthony Kiedis – lead vocals
- Hillel Slovak – guitars
- Flea – bass
- Cliff Martinez – drums

Additional musicians

- Benny Cowan – trumpet (tracks 2–5, 8, 14)
- Maceo Parker – saxophone (tracks 2–5, 8, 14)
- Fred Wesley – trombone (tracks 2–5, 8, 14)
- Larry Fratangelo – percussion
- Steve Boyd – backing vocals
- George Clinton – backing vocals
- Shirley Hayden – backing vocals
- Robert "Peanut" Johnson – backing vocals
- Lous "Bro" Kabbabie – backing vocals
- Pat Lewis – backing vocals
- Mike "Clip" Payne – backing vocals
- Garry Shider – backing vocals
- Joel Virgel – backing vocals
- Andre Foxxe – backing vocals
- Uncredited – backing spoken vocals (track 14)

Production

- George Clinton – producer
- Greg Ward – engineer, mixing
- John Bauer – second engineer
- Jim "JB" Baurlein – mixing ("Sex Rap")
- Red Hot Chili Peppers – mixing ("Sex Rap")
- Bruce Nazarian – mixing ("Yertle the Turtle")
- Jim Vitti – mixing ("The Brother's Cup" and "Blackeyed Blonde")
- Fred Wesley – horn arrangements
- Ron McMaster – remastering

Additional personnel

- Nels Israelson – photography
- Henry Marquex – art direction
- Peter Shea – design
- Muruga Booker – massages

== Certifications ==
Region	Certification	Certified units/sales
United Kingdom (BPI)	Silver	60,000^{^}
^{^} Shipments figures based on certification alone.

== Bibliography ==
- Apter, Jeff (2004). Fornication: The Red Hot Chili Peppers Story. Omnibus Press. ISBN 1-84449-381-4.
- Kiedis, Anthony; Sloman, Larry (October 6, 2004). Scar Tissue. Hyperion. ISBN 1-4013-0101-0.
- Mullen, Brendan (October 19, 2010). An Oral/Visual History by the Red Hot Chili Peppers. Los Angeles, California: It Books. p. 256. ISBN 978-0-06-135191-4.
