= The Red Hot Chili Peppers (album) =

- Cover art designed by Gary Panter

Studio album by Red Hot Chili Peppers
- Released: August 10, 1984
- Recorded: April 1984
- Studios: Eldorado, Hollywood, California
- Genres: Funk rock; rap rock; funk metal
- Length: 31:54
- Labels: EMI America; Enigma
- Producer: Andy Gill

Red Hot Chili Peppers chronology
The Red Hot Chili Peppers (1984)	Freaky Styley (1985)

Singles from The Red Hot Chili Peppers
- 1. "True Men Don't Kill Coyotes" Released: 1984; 2. "Get Up and Jump" Released: 1984

The Red Hot Chili Peppers is the debut studio album by American rock band Red Hot Chili Peppers, released on August 10, 1984, via EMI America and Enigma Records. The album was produced by Gang of Four guitarist Andy Gill, and is the only Peppers album to feature Jack Sherman on guitar. Sherman was in the band as a replacement for founding member Hillel Slovak, who left the band along with founding drummer Jack Irons before the album was recorded. After the tour for this album, Sherman was fired and Slovak rejoined the band. The album also features founding members Anthony Kiedis on vocals and Flea on bass, as well as Cliff Martinez on drums.

== Writing and recording ==
The band was often at odds with producer Andy Gill over the musical direction of the album. Anthony Kiedis was disappointed with the overall sound, thinking that it lacked the raw energy of the band's original 1983 demo tape. In his 2004 autobiography Scar Tissue, Kiedis recalled, "One day, I got a glimpse of Gill's notebook, and next to the song 'Police Helicopter', he'd written 'Shit.' I was demolished that he had dismissed that as shit. 'Police Helicopter' was a jewel in our crown. It embodied the spirit of who we were, which was this kinetic, stabbing, angular, shocking assault force of sound and energy. Reading his notes probably sealed the deal in our minds that 'Okay, now we're working with the enemy', It became very much him against us, especially Flea and me. It became a real battle to make the record."

Flea expressed similar misgivings in a June 2023 interview with the Los Angeles Times: "I always regret the way we made the first one. I think the songs are really good. Our band was smoking at the time. But Jack and Hillel quit, and we hired these two other guys: Jack Sherman and Cliff Martinez. Both were great musicians, but the connection just wasn’t as profound as we had with the guys we started with. I’ve often wanted to go back and re-record that album, but I can never talk anyone into it."

Gwen Dickey, better known by her stage name, Rose Norwalt, provides backing vocals on "Mommy Where's Daddy?" Dickey was the singer for the 1970s group Rose Royce. On live performances of the song, her lines are performed by Flea.

== Reception ==
Professional ratings
Review scores
Source	Rating
AllMusic	2.5/5 stars
The Rolling Stone Album Guide	1/5 stars
Select	3/5 medals
The Village Voice	B−

The album failed to chart on the Billboard 200, reaching No. 201 (meaning it "bubbled under" the main album chart for eight weeks in the autumn of 1984). The album received college airplay and MTV rotation, and built the band's fan base. The reviews that were published of the album were mixed, with the first issue of Spin magazine giving, according to Kiedis in Scar Tissue, a positive review. Stephen Thomas Erlewine of AllMusic later wrote that "their first effort didn't quite gel into a cohesive album". Robert Christgau stated: "As minstrelsy goes, this is good-hearted stuff (and as minstrelsy, it had better be). The reason it doesn't quite come off isn't that it's good-hearted, either: the band is outrageous enough, though probably not the way it thinks it is. Perhaps there's a clue in this mysterious observation from spokesperson Flea: 'Grandmaster Flash and Kurtis Blow have great raps, but not that great music with it.' In a bassist, that's serious delusion."

As of 2007, it had sold about 300,000 copies worldwide. Kiedis and Flea have said over the years that they prefer the demo versions of most of the songs, which were recorded with the original lineup featuring Slovak and Irons; however, the band acknowledged in various books that Sherman's contributions to the band, particularly his knowledge of funk music and music theory, were instrumental in the band's development that were not present with Slovak.

== Live performances ==
Songs from this album were played live dozens of times throughout the 1980s, but nearly all them had left the setlist by the 1990s.

As of February 2025, many of the songs from the album have not been performed in decades, with one-off performances of "You Always Sing the Same" in 2011, "Mommy Where's Daddy?" in 2016/2017 (and teased in 2022) "Police Helicopter" in 2019, and "Out in L.A." in 2023.

== Track listing ==
Side one
No.	Title	Writer(s)	Length
1.	"True Men Don't Kill Coyotes"	Flea; Anthony Kiedis; Jack Sherman; Cliff Martinez	3:38
2.	"Baby Appeal"	Flea; Kiedis; Sherman; Martinez; Hillel Slovak	3:40
3.	"Buckle Down"	Flea; Kiedis; Sherman; Martinez	3:21
4.	"Get Up and Jump"	Flea; Kiedis	2:51
5.	"Why Don't You Love Me"	Hank Williams	3:21

Side two
No.	Title	Writer(s)	Length
6.	"Green Heaven"	Flea; Kiedis	3:58
7.	"Mommy Where's Daddy"	Flea; Kiedis; Sherman; Martinez	3:29
8.	"Out in L.A."	Flea; Kiedis	2:00
9.	"Police Helicopter"	Flea; Kiedis	1:16
10.	"You Always Sing the Same"	Flea	0:16
11.	"Grand Pappy Du Plenty" (instrumental)	Flea; Kiedis; Sherman; Martinez; Andy Gill	4:04
Total length:			31:54

Bonus tracks on 2003 remastered CD version
No.	Title	Length
12.	"Get Up and Jump" (demo)	2:37
13.	"Police Helicopter" (demo)	1:12
14.	"Out in L.A." (demo)	1:56
15.	"Green Heaven" (demo)	3:50
16.	"What It Is (aka Nina's Song)" (demo)	3:57
Total length:		45:26

== Personnel ==
Red Hot Chili Peppers

- Anthony Kiedis – vocals
- Jack Sherman – guitar
- Flea – bass
- Cliff Martinez – drums

Additional musicians

- Keith Barry – horn arrangements and viola
- Cliff Brooks – timbales and congas
- Gwen Dickey – backing vocals
- Patrick English – trumpet
- Kenny Flood – tenor saxophone
- Phil Ranelin – trombone

Recording personnel

- Andy Gill – producer
- Spit Stix – producer (demos)
- Dave Jerden – engineer
- Carolyn Collins – assistant engineer
- Rob Stevens – mixing
- Barry Conley – mixing assistant
- Greg Fulginiti – mastering

Artwork

- Gary Panter – cover art
- Edward Colver – photography
- Howard Rosenberg – photography
- Henry Marquez – art direction

=== 2003 edition bonus tracks (tracks 12–16) ===
- Anthony Kiedis – vocals
- Hillel Slovak – guitar, talk box
- Flea – bass
- Jack Irons – drums

=== 2003 remastered version personnel ===
- Kevin Flaherty – producer for reissue
- Ron McMaster – remastering
- Kenny Nemes – project manager
- Michelle Azzopardi – art direction
- Kristine L. Barnard – design
- John Dinser – photo imaging and additional design
- Edward Colver – photography
- Howard Rosenberg – photography
- EMI Archives – photography
