= Gold Coast International Film Festival =

The Gold Coast International Film Festival launched in 2011, on the north shore of North Hempstead, New York. The festival, now held every November, completed its 7th year in 2017. The festival is produced by the Gold Coast Arts Center, a not-for-profit 501(c)(3) multi-arts center based in Great Neck, NY. Founding sponsors of the festival include the Town of North Hempstead and Douglas Elliman Real Estate. The festival was founded with the mission of establishing a home on Long Island to showcase the work of exceptional filmmakers and provide the public with an insider's view of the film industry. Festival events include screenings, workshops, conversations with prominent members of the film community, parties.

== Venues ==
Screening venues for the festival include Bow Tie Cinemas in Port Washington, Manhasset, Great Neck, and Roslyn, and Soundview Cinemas in Port Washington. Additional screenings and special events have been held at the Gold Coast Arts Center, Hofstra University, LIU Post / Tilles Center, Nassau County Museum of Art, NYIT's Auditorium on Broadway and deSeversky Mansion, Landmark on Main Street, the Port Washington, Manhasset and Great Neck libraries, Cinema Arts Center in Huntington, and Chaminade High School.

In its initial year, former Town of North Hempstead Supervisor Jon Kaiman and the North Hempstead Town Board were supportive of the festival to showcase the Town's local communities and was pleased that the festival boosted local economy.

== Honorees ==
The 2014 Artist of Distinction Award was presented to Catherine Martin, Academy Award-Winning Production & Costume Designer of Moulin Rouge! and The Great Gatsby. Writer-director Talya Lavie was presented with the festival's first Screenwriting Award for her film Zero Motivation.

Comedian Susie Essman received GCIFF's 2013 Artist of Distinction Award, and actor Paul Sorvino received a lifetime achievement award.

Actor, director, and producer Edward Burns, who was raised in Nassau County, Long Island, was the recipient of GCIFF's 2012 Artist of Distinction Award. He presented his latest film, The Fitzgerald Family Christmas, which was filmed largely on Long Island.

Actor Bruce Dern received the 2011 Legend Award. Dern played Tom Buchanan in the 1974 Robert Redford film, The Great Gatsby based on the book by F. Scott Fitzgerald. The "Great Gatsby" is set on Long Island's Gold Coast—the exact location of the Gold Coast International Film Festival—during the summer of 1922.

== Films and events ==
Heading Home: The Tale of Team Israel, a 2018 documentary film about the underdog Israel national baseball team competing for the first time in the World Baseball Classic, won the Audience Award for Best Documentary at the 2018 Gold Coast International Film Festival.

Film highlights of the 2014 festival included the World Premiere of the American Masters film August Wilson: The Ground On Which I Stand, Human Capital, When the Garden Was Eden with writer Harvey Araton, and Tribeca Film Festival winner Zero Motivation.

Notable films of 2013 included eventual Oscar-nominee Nebraska starring Bruce Dern, The Face of Love starring Annette Bening, and The Short Game. Events included a conversation with writer Jay McInerney about bringing his novel Bright Lights, Big City to the big screen, and a screening of The Prime Ministers: The Pioneers with former Israeli Ambassador to the UK and author Yehuda Avner.

Film highlights of the 2012 festival included Don't Stop Believin': Everyman's Journey, The Fitzgerald Family Christmas, the 1920 silent film The Mark of Zorro with live organ accompaniment, Dustin Hoffman's Quartet, A Royal Affair, and David O. Russell's Silver Linings Playbook.

The 2012 Festival's notable events included:

- Conversation with Hollywood agent Budd Burton Moss, and also featuring actor Andrew Prine, actress/producer Heather Lowe, model/actress Kiera Chaplin, and filmmaker Loren Herbert
- Screening of the classic film West Side Story, featuring a conversation with original cast member Russ Tamblyn
- Panel on independent filmmaking with screenwriter/producer David L. Paterson (Bridge to Terabitiha) and director Louis Guerra (Homeland)
- Screening of the film Mother of Normandy, featuring a panel with director Doug Stebleton, writer Jeff Stoffer, Maurice Renaud, and Peter Kinney

The 2011 Festival screened 65 feature-length and 20 short films – "a roster of bold, dynamic films" and "content with outstanding merit, new, old, long and short." Notable screenings included Chasing Madoff, The Best and the Brightest, Lucky, Submarine, My Afternoons with Margueritte, Bob and the Monster and Tabloid.

== Awards ==
The 2014 Gold Coast International Film Festival Awards:

- Audience Award for Best Narrative Feature: Paulette, directed by Jérôme Enrico
- Audience Award for Best Documentary Feature: August Wilson: The Ground On Which I Stand, directed by Sam Pollard
- Audience Award for Best Short Film: Welcome to China, directed by Olivier Ayache-Vidal
- Jury Award for Best Short Film: Why Do I Study Physics?, directed by Xiangjun Shi

The 2013 Gold Coast International Film Festival Awards:

- Audience Award for Best Narrative Feature: Nebraska, directed by Alexander Payne and Foreign Letters, directed by Ela Thier
- Audience Award for Best Documentary Feature: Comedy Warriors: Healing Through Humor, directed by John Wager and The Prime Ministers: The Pioneers, directed by Richard Trank
- Audience Award for Best Short Film: Plurality, directed by Dennis A. Liu
- Jury Award for Best Short Film: Noah, directed by Patrick Cederberg & Walter Woodman

The 2012 Gold Coast International Film Festival Awards:

- Audience Award for Best Narrative Feature: Silver Linings Playbook, directed by David O. Russell
- Audience Award for Best Documentary Feature: One Track Heart: The Story of Krishna Das, directed by Jeremy Friendel
- Audience Award for Best Short Film: Pigeon Impossible, directed by Lucas Martell
- Jury Award for Best Short Film: Luminaris, directed by Juan Pablo Zaramella
- Jury Award for Best Student Short Film: Sight, directed by Daniel Lazo and Eran May-Raz

The 2011 Gold Coast International Film Festival Awards:

- Bruce Dern was honored with the first-ever GCIFF Legend Award.
- The Audience Award for Best Narrative Feature went to Jean Becker's film My Afternoons with Margueritte.
- The Audience Award for Best Documentary Feature went to Bob and the Monster, Keirda Bahruth's documentary about Bob Forrest.
- Jury-Selected Best Feature Short went to Noreen, directed by Domhnall Gleeson
- Jury-Selected Best Documentary Short went to In the Spirit of Laxmi, directed by Megan Shea.
- Bob and the Monster won the New York Post Trailer Competition, closely beating out My Sucky Teen Romance directed by Emily Hagins.

== Year-round screenings ==
The Festival presents year-round screenings through its Furman Film Series. For over 15 years, the Furman Film Series has presented a sophisticated cross-section of powerful and thought-provoking independent, art, classic, and foreign films. The series mainly hosts sneak previews of highly anticipated films prior to their theatrical release dates followed by a discussion with a relevant speaker who provides exciting insight into the film and subject matter. Notable screenings have included: Life is Beautiful, Amélie, The King's Speech, The Descendants, The Artist, and Philomena.
