= Keirda Bahruth =

American documentary filmmaker

Keirda Bahruth (born January 26, in West Islip, NY) is an American filmmaker based in Los Angeles, CA. She began her career working on Music Videos and Commercials before a move to New York teamed her up with legendary Saturday Night Live director James Signorelli, famous for his commercial parody sketches. As Signorelli's assistant, she began shooting behind-the-scenes footage of life at SNL for the show's 25th Anniversary Special, which gave her complete access to the inner workings of the show. After three full seasons at SNL, Bahruth returned to Los Angeles in 2001 and joined the nascent world of reality television. She has worked as a director and producer on shows for the Discovery Channel, E!, Fox, NBC/Universal, The WB and BET.

By 2004, Bahruth began shooting Bob and the Monster, her first documentary feature about indie-punk cult hero Bob Forrest. A critically acclaimed songwriter, whose band Thelonious Monster had come up with Red Hot Chili Peppers, Fishbone and Jane's Addiction, Forrest was lauded as the next Bob Dylan and roundly admired by music legends such as Tom Waits and Joe Strummer. Bob and the Monster was completed in 2011 and made its World Premiere at the SXSW Film Festival in Austin, TX.

== We Live in Public ==
In 2008, Bahruth produced the Ondi Timoner film We Live In Public which premiered at the Sundance Film Festival. The film considers some of the darker effects of modern media and technology on our personal identity through an examination of "the greatest internet pioneer you've never heard of", Josh Harris. The dot-com millionaire had an affinity for expensive fascist-themed social experiments that eventually led to his mental breakdown. We Live In Public won the Grand Jury Prize award in the U.S. documentary category at the Sundance Film Festival.

== Bob and The Monster ==
The film follows outspoken indie-rock hero Bob Forrest through his life-threatening struggle with addiction to his transformation into one of the most influential and controversial drug counselors in the US today. Bob and the Monster crafts contemporary footage, animation and interviews with archival performances and personal videos from Bob's past to reflect the complex layers of this troubled, but hopeful soul.

The film made its World Premiere at the 2011 SXSW festival and continues to play the festival circuit with screenings at Nashville Film Festival, CIMMFest (WINNER Best Documentary), HotDocs, Gold Coast International Film Festival (WINNER Audience Award Best Documentary, WINNER Best Trailer), Sheffield Doc/Fest, AFI/Discovery Channel Silverdocs, Sound Unseen, Bergen International Film Festival, Starz! Denver Film Festival and IDFA.
