= Tree (musician) =

American musician

- Also known as: Keith "The Tree" Barry
- Born: Keith Barry; New York City
- Genres: Funk rock; alternative rock; experimental rock; jazz; bebop
- Occupations: Musician; Music teacher
- Instruments: Saxophone; viola; flute; cornet; clarinet; harmonica
- Years active: 1984–present
- Label: Saphu Records
- Member of: Mandrill
- Formerly of: Red Hot Chili Peppers

Keith Barry (born 1963 or 1964) known professionally as Tree, is an American musician and multi-instrumentalist. He is best known as a past touring member of the Red Hot Chili Peppers, and for having appeared on several albums released by the band. He is also a member of the funk band Mandrill. He has collaborated with groups including Gov't Mule and Thelonious Monster. Tree is the co-founder and former dean of the Silverlake Conservatory of Music.

== Early life ==
Tree was a native of New York City. He lived with his mother and sister in Far Rockaway before the family relocated to rural New Jersey. At the age of 12, Tree moved in with his father who lived in Los Angeles.

Tree attended Bancroft Middle School and Fairfax High School. In junior high, he met Flea, and the two remained friends throughout high school. He started using the name Tree during a ski trip with Flea and Anthony Kiedis.

Tree was a prodigious music student. He was drawn to the viola after meeting Novi Novog, and was later taught by Norman Botnick. Although viola was his preferred instrument, he sought to learn a new instrument each semester of band class.

After high school, Tree attended the Berklee College of Music. He dropped out to move back to New York City.

== Career ==
Tree returned to Los Angeles. He was around for the formation of the Red Hot Chili Peppers by his old classmates, and claims he came up with the band's name. He is credited with playing viola and arranging horns on their first album, The Red Hot Chili Peppers. Tree returned to the band in 1989, playing tenor saxophone on the album Mother's Milk. Tree joined on the Mother's Milk Tour and the band played as a quintet.

Tree worked as a music teacher. In 2001, Flea and Tree co founded the Silverlake Conservatory of Music, where Tree served as the Conservatory's dean. Tree, a noted instrumentalist, taught many of the classes himself. In 2004, the Los Angeles Times called him "a master of nearly every instrument".

Tree is a believer in the car-free movement. He relocated to Humboldt County in 2019 citing increasingly dangerous conditions for cyclists in Los Angeles. That year, Tree joined the All Seasons Orchestra of Arcata, California on viola. In 2020, he retired from teaching at Silverlake.

== Partial discography ==
=== Solo ===
- Blew Year's Proposition (1995 album)

=== Collaborations ===
Red Hot Chili Peppers

- The Red Hot Chili Peppers (1984 album), selected tracks
- Mother's Milk (1989 album): tenor saxophone on "Subway to Venus" and "Sexy Mexican Maid"
- One Hot Minute (1995 album): violin on "Tearjerker"

Thelonius Monster

- Baby...You're Bummin' My Life out in a Supreme Fashion (1986 album), selected tracks
- Next Saturday Afternoon (1987 album), selected tracks
- Stormy Weather, (1989 album), selected tracks

Other

- The Deep End, Volume 1, Gov't Mule (2001 album): tenor sax on "Down and Out in New York City"
- Helen Burns, Flea (2012 EP): harmonica on "Lovelovelove"
- Back In Town, Mandrill (2019)
