= You Come and Go Like a Pop Song =

Studio album by The Bicycle Thief
- Released: September 21, 1999
- Genre: Alternative rock
- Length: 45:31 (1999 release); 48:30 (2001 re-release)
- Labels: Artemis, Musicrama, Goldenvoice
- Producers: Marc Hutner, Josh Blum

The Bicycle Thief chronology
You Come and Go Like a Pop Song (1999)	Stoned +2 (2001)

Professional ratings
Review scores
Source	Rating
Allmusic	4/5 stars
PopMatters	(not rated)
CMJ New Music Monthly	(not rated)

You Come and Go Like a Pop Song is an album by The Bicycle Thief, released in 1999 and re-released with a different track listing in 2001.

Songs on the album were predominantly written by frontman Bob Forrest (singer for LA band Thelonious Monster), though Josh Klinghoffer (later to play in Red Hot Chili Peppers and Dot Hacker) played a major role, contributing drums, guitars, keyboards, and songwriting.

Red Hot Chili Peppers guitarist John Frusciante appears on "Cereal Song", playing a lead guitar solo. Additional musicians, songwriters, and producers for the album include Josh Blum, Kevin Fitzgerald, and Marc Hunter.

On July 21, 2020, it was announced via the Instagram page of The Bicycle Thief that the album was to be reissued for a third time and for first time on vinyl with the inclusion of "Song for a Kevin Spacey Movie" and "Trust Fund Girl" as bonus tracks in a 7" yellow-vinyl. The album includes a digital-download card to get "Birthday Cake Rarities", a 24-tracks album of demos, live tracks, and two previously unreleased studio tracks. The release date was set for September 21, 2020 – the 21st anniversary of the album.

== Track listing ==
=== 1999 version ===
No.	Title	Writer(s)	Length
1.	"Hurt"	Bob Forrest, Josh Klinghoffer, Kevin Fitzgerald	2:48
2.	"Tennis Shoes"	Forrest, Klinghoffer, Marc Hunter, Josh Blum	3:15
3.	"Rainin' (4AM)"	Forrest, Dix Denney	3:40
4.	"Aspirations"	Forrest, Hunter, Blum	4:25
5.	"Max, Jill Called"	Forrest	3:07
6.	"Off Street Parking"	Forrest	4:17
7.	"L.A. Country Hometown Blues"	Forrest, Klinghoffer, Fitzgerald	4:30
8.	"MacArthur Park Revisited"	Forrest, Hunter, Blum	3:26
9.	"Everyone Asks"	Forrest	4:41
10.	"It's Alright"	Forrest, Klinghoffer	4:01
11.	"Rhonda Meets the Birdman"		0:17
12.	"Cereal Song"	Forrest	4:29
13.	"Boy at a Bus Stop"	Forrest	2:35
Total length:			45:31

=== 2001 version ===
For the 2001 re-release of the album, the track listing was completely changed, the tracks "It's Alright" and "Rhonda Meets the Birdman" were replaced with "Song for a Kevin Spacey Movie" and "Trust Fund Girl", and "Aspirations" was renamed to "Stoned".

No.	Title	Writer(s)	Length
1.	"Song for a Kevin Spacey Movie"	Forrest	3:04
2.	"Stoned" (called "Aspirations" on the album's first release)	Forrest, Blum, Hunter	4:25
3.	"Max, Jill Called"	Forrest	3:07
4.	"Tennis Shoes"	Forrest, Blum, Klinghoffer, Hunter	3:15
5.	"Off Street Parking"	Forrest	4:17
6.	"L.A. Country Hometown Blues"	Forrest, Klinghoffer, Fitzgerald	4:30
7.	"Hurt"	Forrest, Klinghoffer, Fitzgerald	2:48
8.	"Rainin' (4AM)"	Forrest, Denney	3:40
9.	"Everyone Asks"	Forrest	4:41
10.	"Trust Fund Girl"	Forrest, Klinghoffer	4:13
11.	"MacArthur Park Revisited"	Forrest, Blum, Hunter	3:26
12.	"Cereal Song"	Forrest	4:29
13.	"Boy at a Bus Stop"	Forrest	2:35
Total length:			48:30

== Personnel ==
=== 1999 version ===
- Bob Forrest – vocals
- Josh Klinghoffer – guitar, drums (tracks 2–4, 6–9), vocals (tracks 1, 4, 7–10), Rhodes piano (tracks 4, 6, 13), Wurlitzer electric piano (track 1), Dobro resonator guitar (track 7), organ (tracks 6, 9), lap steel guitar (track 11), cello (track 13), cello bass (track 7)
- Josh Blum – bass (tracks 1–6, 8–10, 12), percussion (tracks 1–2, 4, 8–9), Wurlitzer electric piano (track 2), keyboard (track 13)
- Kevin Fitzgerald – drums (tracks 1, 5, 10, 12)
- Anna Waronker – vocals (tracks 3, 7)
- Marc Hutner – guitar (track 4)
- Nina – cello (track 9)
- John Frusciante – guitar solo (track 12)

== Singles ==
"Stoned" (called "Aspirations" on the album's first release) was released as a single in 2001 around the same time as the re-release of the album.

=== Stoned +2 track listing ===
No.	Title	Writer(s)	Length
1.	"Stoned" (Radio Edit)	Bob Forrest, Josh Blum, Josh Klinghoffer, Marc Hutner	3:13
2.	"You Won't Be Missed"	Bob Forrest	4:23
3.	"It's Alright (Variations on an Oasis Theme)"	Bob Forrest, Josh Klinghoffer	3:59
Total length:			11:35

== Extra links ==
- You Come And Go Like A Pop Song 1999 release 2001 re-release at Discogs
