= Wendy's Shabbat =

2018 film directed by Rachel Myers

Wendy's Shabbat is a 2018 documentary film directed and produced by Rachel Myers. It stars Roberta Mahler, Lou Silberman, Sharon Goodman, Gerri Gussman and Rabbi Isaiah Zeldin. It premiered at the Tribeca Film Festival 2018 and Palm Springs International Film Festival 2018, and over 50 other film festivals world wide where it won Audience Choice Awards at the Seattle Jewish Film Festival 2019, Jewish & Israeli Film Festival 2019, Audience Choice Award Winner Gold Coast International Film Festival 2018. Wendy's Shabbat theatrically premiered at Leammle Theatre- Music Hall and qualified for 2018 Academy Awards. The film was critically appraised for its subject and depiction of documentary subjects featured in the film.

== Plot ==
Shabbat dinner gatherings for these Jewish senior citizens is at the Wendy's Fast Food restaurant where they say prayers and light candles over hamburgers and fries.

== Cast ==
Roberta Mahler, Sharon & Michael Goodman, Lou Silberman, Rabbi Isaiah Zeldin, Gerri Gussman, Winston Barrister, Pat Cochrane, Anne Arone, Shirley & Murray Axelrod, Annabel Goldstein Barbara & Kenneth Baron, Helen & Harry Binder, Ernie & Renee Charney, Andrea Goodwin, Hal Grimm, Anne Miller, Judy Moordigian, Lili & Dan Shaps, Brenda Parvim, Annette Wilson, Sandy & Marlene Warner, Felix Zygielman, Rose Sharf, Bea Goldberg

== Release ==
It was broadcast on PBS television on March 18, 2019 and POV. Topic Video purchased the film for release in 2019 on their streaming platform.

=== Critical response ===
Wendy's Shabbat was Featured in the New York Times, On The Today Show, The Forward

"Their cherished tradition has been documented in an adorable short film. Wendy’s Shabbat is a documentary that follows the crew, nearly all in their eighties and nineties, as they relay the tale of their community’s tradition."
