= Ran Danker =

Israeli–American actor, singer and model (born 1984)

- רן דנקר
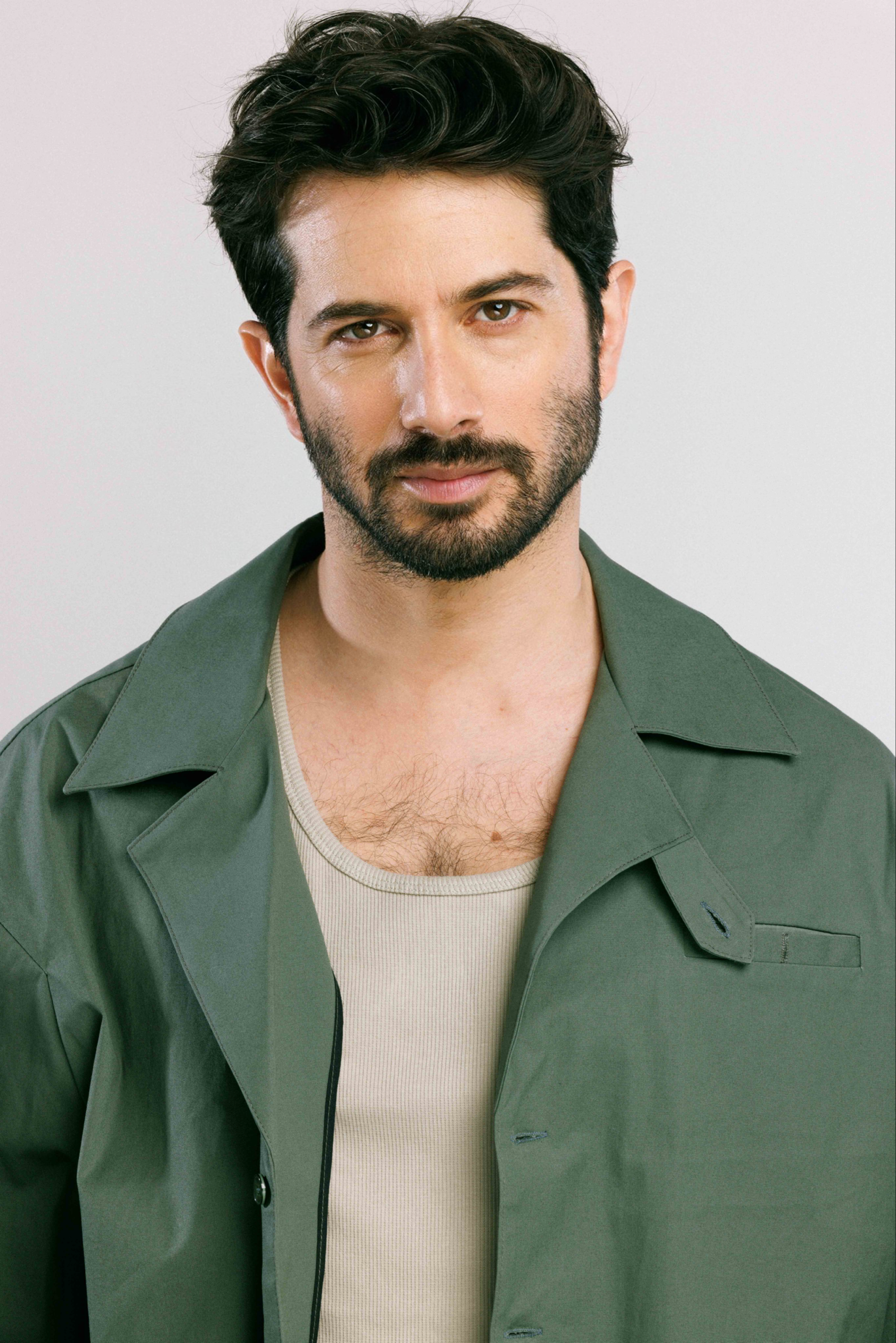
- Danker in 2023
- Born: Khalil Yosef Danker; January 7, 1984 (age 42); Norfolk, Virginia, U.S.
- Occupations: Actor, singer and model
- Musical career
- Years active: 2007–present (music); 2004–present (actor)

Ran Danker (Hebrew: רן דנקר; born Khalil Yosef Danker on January 7, 1984) is an Israeli–American actor, singer and model. He starred in the Israeli television series HaShir Shelanu (2004–2007), The Gordin Cell (2012–2015) and Miguel (2018). Danker received Ophir Award nominations for Best Supporting Actor for Eyes Wide Open (2009) and Best Actor for Doubtful (2017). His 2021 single "Beit Meshugaim" was named song of the year in Galgalatz's annual chart, and in 2026 he won a theatre award for his performance as the Emcee in the Cameri Theatre production of Cabaret.

== Early life ==
Danker was born in Norfolk, Virginia, United States, to a Jewish family. He is the son of Israeli actor Eli Danker. He moved to Israel with his mother when he was two years old after his parents' divorce. He grew up in the Bavli neighborhood in Tel Aviv and sang in the choir of the boy scouts. When he was in junior high school, the family moved to Poleg, Netanya. Between high school and his army service, Danker appeared in television commercials for Channel 10, Bank Leumi and the cell phone company Cellcom. As a teenager, he worked as a delivery boy for Domino's Pizza in Netanya. He was a helicopter technician during his military service in the Israel Defense Forces.

== Career ==
In addition to his acting and singing career, Danker has appeared as a fashion model in campaigns for Diadora.

=== Film and television ===
In 2004, he was cast in HaShir Shelanu (Our Song), which ran for four seasons. He also appeared in two children's shows, a musical production of The Sound of Music in Tel Aviv and later Haifa, and the Festigal (an annual Hanukkah song festival) in 2004 and 2005. He also appeared in the 2021 edition. In December 2005, Danker won the Golden Screen Award for best actor for his role in HaShir Shelanu, and in January 2006 he won the Kids Channel Award in the same category. He voiced the title character in the Hebrew-dubbed version of Disney's animated film Chicken Little. Readers of the TV magazine Pnai Plus named him actor of the year in 2006. In 2008, he began appearing as the title character in the musical daily drama Danny Hollywood.

In 2009, he starred opposite Zohar Strauss as a gay lover in the Israeli drama film Eyes Wide Open, for which he received an Ophir Award nomination for Best Supporting Actor. Between 2012 and 2015, he played the lead role of Eyal "Alik" Gordin in the TV drama The Gordin Cell. Haaretz described the show as "among the world's best suspense shows", and it was remade in the United States as Allegiance (2015). In 2017, he received an Ophir Award nomination for Best Actor for his role in Doubtful as a man serving community service by working with juvenile delinquents.

In 2018, Danker began appearing in Miguel, playing a gay man determined to adopt a child. The series had its world premiere at the first Canneseries festival, where it won the special performance prize for best ensemble cast. In 2020, he starred in Honeymood, a romantic comedy by Talya Lavie, director of Zero Motivation.

In 2026, Danker was cast in the second season of the Keshet 12 comedy-drama Save the Date (Bekarov Etzli), as a well-known musician.

=== Stage ===
In The Sound of Music he played Rolf, the young Nazi messenger who falls in love with Liesl, the eldest von Trapp daughter. He performed in 40 shows before leaving for Festigal 2005. In 2015, he played the German lawyer Hans Litten in the Habima Theatre production of Taken at Midnight. Litten represented opponents of the Nazis at political trials between 1929 and 1932 and defended workers' rights during the Weimar Republic. In 2017, he returned to Habima to play Che in the Israeli production of Evita.

In 2026, Danker played the Emcee in a new production of Cabaret at the Cameri Theatre. He won an award for the role in September 2026.

=== Music ===
In 2007, Danker released his debut album, Shavim (Hebrew: שווים, lit. 'Equal'), with guitarist Ilai Botner. He released a second Hebrew-language album, Something Different, in 2018.

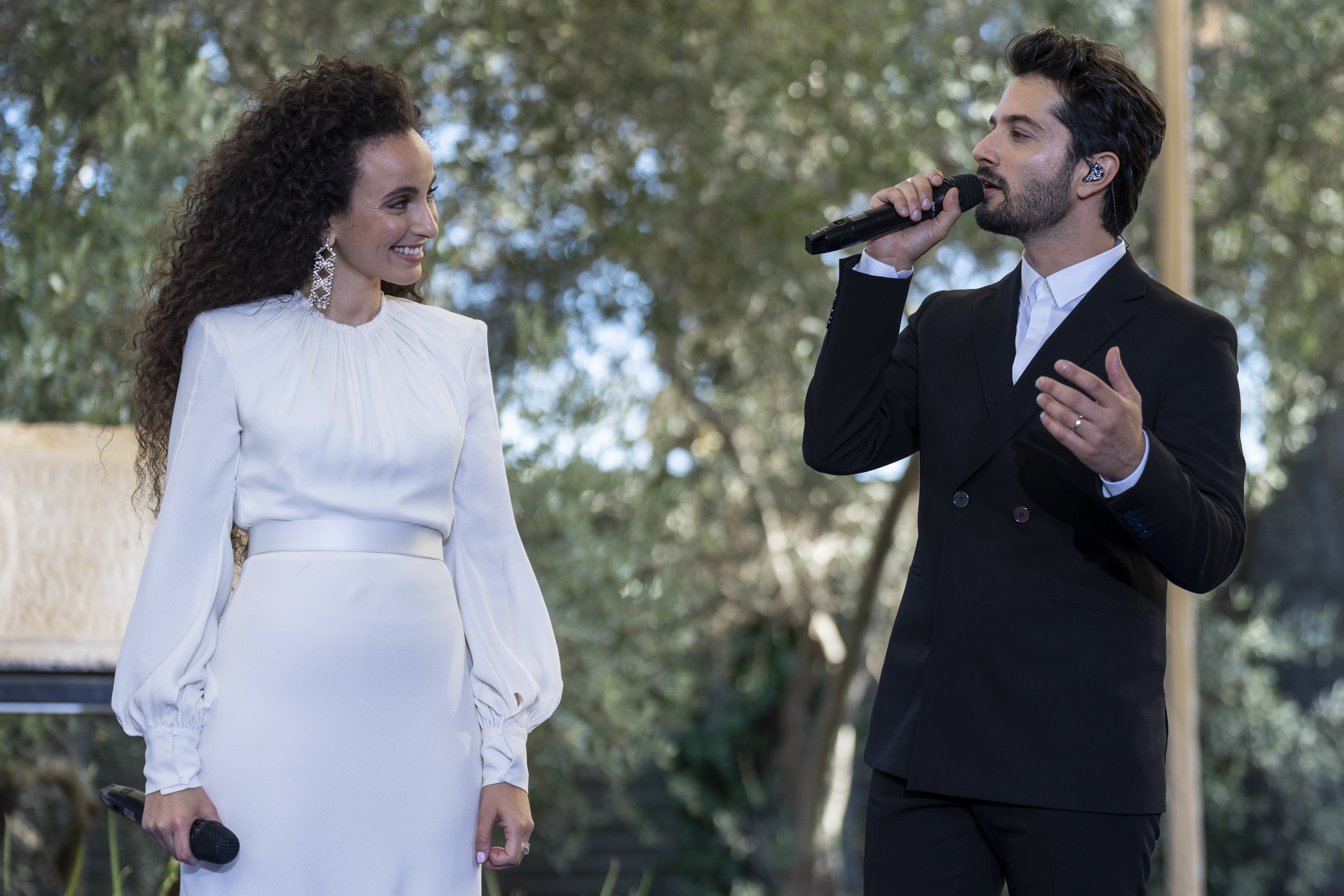
Yuval Dayan and Ran Danker sing a mash-up of "Let it Be" and an Israeli song called "Lu Yehi".

In March 2021, he released the single "Beit Meshugaim" (Hebrew: בית משוגעים, lit. 'Madhouse'), which was named song of the year in the 2021 annual chart of Galgalatz and Walla!; Danker also shared the chart's "People of the Year" title with Noa Kirel and Raviv Kanner. It was followed in October 2021 by "Hasimla Hadasha Sheli" (Hebrew: השמלה החדשה שלי, lit. 'My new dress'), produced by DEGO.

On July 14, 2022, he performed the song "Lu Yehi" at Beit HaNassi with singer Yuval Dayan, in front of President Joe Biden during his visit to Israel.

== Personal life ==
Danker was previously in a high-profile relationship with his HaShir Shelanu co-star Ninet Tayeb; Israeli media labelled the pair "Raninet". After their breakup, Pnai Plus named him the most eligible bachelor of 2007. Danker and Tayeb have remained friends.

In July 2015, Danker came out as bisexual and said he had been in a relationship with a man for three years. He said he was attracted to both women and men and did not want to define himself.

== Filmography ==
| Year | Title | Role | Notes |
|---|---|---|---|
| 2004–2007 | HaShir Shelanu | Zohar Lahat / Rani Aviv | Series regular |
| 2008 | Restless | Tzach | Amos Kollek film |
| 2008–2009 | Danny Hollywood | Daniel Berger | Series regular |
| 2009 | Eyes Wide Open | Ezri | |
| 2010 | Rabies | Michael | |
| 2012–2015 | The Gordin Cell | Eyal "Alik" Gordin | Series regular |
| 2014 | Underwater | Nir | Short film |
| 2015 | Amok | Party guest/butcher | |
| 2017 | Doubtful | Assi | |
| 2018 | Miguel | Tom | Series regular |
| 2020 | Honeymood | Noam | |
| 2022 | Wild Sea | Leon | Short film |
| TBA | Save the Date (Bekarov Etzli) | | Season 2 |

== Discography ==
=== Albums ===
- Shavim (שווים, "Equal") (2007) (with Ilai Botner)
- Something Different (משהו אחר) (2018)

=== Soundtrack ===
- Our Song (השיר שלנו) – double album

=== Singles ===
- "Shavim" (שווים) (2007)
- "Bo'i Nazov" (בואי נעזוב, "Let's leave") (2007)
- "Ani Esh" (אני אש, "I am fire") (2007)
- "Beit Meshugaim" (בית משוגעים, "Madhouse") (2021)
- "Hasimla Hadasha Sheli" (השמלה החדשה שלי, "My new dress") (2021)
