= Huntington Beach High School =

Public high school in California

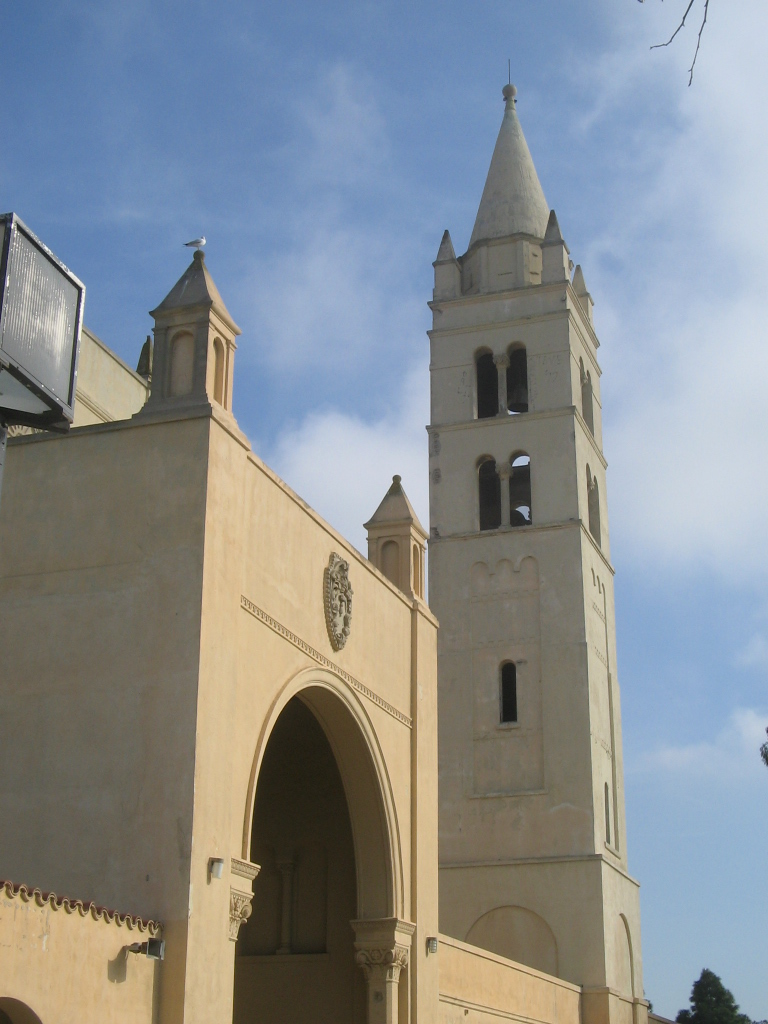

Location
- 1905 Main Street; Huntington Beach, California 92648; United States; 33.67636°N 118.0025°W

Information
- Type: Public high school
- Established: 1906 (120 years ago)
- School district: Huntington Beach Union High School District
- Principal: Tim Floyd
- Teaching staff: 112.04 (FTE)
- Grades: 9–12
- Enrollment: 2,734 (2023-2024)
- Student to teacher ratio: 24.40
- Colors: Black and Orange
- Athletics conference: CIF Southern Section; Sunset League
- Nickname: Oilers
- Rival: Marina High School
- Newspaper: Slick Magazine
- Yearbook: The Cauldron
- Website: www.hboilers.com

Huntington Beach High School (HBHS) is a public high school in Huntington Beach, California. Built in 1906, it is part of the Huntington Beach Union High School District. HBHS is a California Distinguished School. Huntington Beach High School is also the home of the Huntington Beach Academy for the Performing Arts.

== Campus ==
Stillwagon Auditorium

Huntington Beach High School bell tower and auditorium were originally built in 1903 and were rebuilt in 1926. In July 2009, renovations were completed on the auditorium and the bell tower. Construction was also completed on the school's performing arts classrooms building and courtyard. The project was funded through taxes.

== Sports ==
Cap Sheue Field is home for Huntington Beach and other local high school athletic organizations.

The school competes in the Sunset League. In 2006 the school moved to the Sea View League (which consisted of Huntington Beach, El Toro, Foothill, Woodbridge, Northwood, and Trabuco Hills) from the Sunset League, but moved back to the Sunset League in 2010. The Sunset League now contains Huntington Beach, Marina, Edison, Fountain Valley, Los Alamitos, Newport Harbor, and Corona Del Mar.

The Huntington Beach High School Boys Varsity Volleyball Team currently holds the national record of 121 consecutive wins.

== Notable alumni ==
=== Athletes ===
- Robert August, professional surfer and film maker
- Collin Balester, pitcher for MLB's Washington Nationals
- Corky Carroll, professional surfer
- Howie Clark, professional baseball player
- Hank Conger, catcher for MLB's Tampa Bay Rays
- Noah Davis (born 1997), pitcher for MLB's Colorado Rockies
- Jim Dedrick, pitcher for MLB's Baltimore Orioles
- TJ DeFalco, professional indoor volleyball player and 2024 Olympic medalist
- Tony Gonzalez, NFL tight end in the Pro Football Hall of Fame
- Jack Haley, basketball player with Los Angeles Lakers and Chicago Bulls
- Dennis Hamilton, professional basketball player
- Kanoa Igarashi, professional surfer and Olympian
- Greg Knapp, professional football coach
- Brandon Loschiavo, diver
- Drew McAthy, professional soccer player
- Jenna Nighswonger, Professional soccer player NJ/NY Gotham FC
- Monte Nitzkowski, Olympic swimmer and Olympic water polo coach
- Tito Ortiz, professional mixed martial artist and former Mayor pro tempore of Huntington Beach
- Lauren Powers, professional bodybuilder and fitness icon
- Nick Pratto, professional baseball player, Kansas City Royals
- Brett Simpson, professional surfer
- Courtenay Stewart, 2004 Olympian
- Alex Wolf, Olympic water polo player (2021)

=== Art and media ===
- Beth Broderick, actor
- Mark Paul Deren, artist known as MADSTEEZ
- Mary Beth Evans, actor
- Jake Koehler, YouTuber
- Brent Rivera, Internet personality and actor
- Kyle Selig, Broadway actor
- Chrissy Teigen, model and television personality

=== Elected officials ===
- Matthew Harper, California State Assemblyman and former Huntington Beach Mayor

=== Musicians ===
- M. Shadows, founder and singer of Avenged Sevenfold
- Mike Martt (died 2023), singer-songwriter and member of Tex & the Horseheads and Thelonious Monster
- Cameron Lew, founder of Ginger Root.
