= Miguel (TV series) =

- Genre: Drama
- Created by: Tom Salama; Daphna Levin
- Directed by: Daphna Levin
- Starring: Ran Danker; Raúl Méndez; Aviv Karmi; Omer Ben David; Miguelito Sojuel
- Composer: Ophir Leibovitch
- Country of origin: Israel
- Original languages: Hebrew; Spanish; English
- No. of series: 1

Production
- Executive producers: Michal Graidy; Shira Lee
- Producers: David Mandil; Diego Conejero; Mirit Toovi
- Production location: Israel
- Cinematography: Amit Yasur
- Running time: 42 minutes

Original release
- Network: Hot 3
- Release: 25 January 2018

Miguel (Hebrew: מיגל, romanized: Miguel) is an Israeli drama television series that was first broadcast in Israel on Hot 3 in January 2018. The series was created by Tom Salama and Daphna Levine and stars Ran Danker as a gay man that adopts a child from Guatemala. The story is loosely based on Salama's own experiences, as he travelled to Central America when he was younger to adopt a child.

== Synopsis ==
Tom, a gay man is determined to become a father and achieve his dream of adopting a child. He travels to Guatemala where he adopts a 5-year-old boy, Miguel and returns with the boy to Israel. Miguel is stubborn to accept his new life and sixteen years later returns to Guatemala in search of his biological mother. Tom, however is determined to shield Miguel from a secret he has been hiding since the adoption.

== Cast ==
- Ran Danker as Tom, the adopted parent of the titular character
- Raúl Méndez as Martin, coordinator of Guatemala's adoption office
- Aviv Karmi as Amira, Tom's friend that accompanies him to Guatemala
- Omer Ben David as Miguel, Tom's grown-up adopted son
- Miguelito Sojuel as young Miguel, the child that Tom adopts
- Adam Karst as Zohar

== Reception ==
Miguel won the special performance prize for best ensemble cast at Canneseries. The Financial Times praised the performance of Miguelito Sojuel playing the younger titular character: "Sojuel is outstanding as an orphan who stubbornly refuses to embrace the new life his adoptive father has planned out for him. Clutching a football as if his life depended on it, he dominates the screen with his defiant eyes: proud of who he is and steadfastly unmoved by gift-wrapped blandishments."

In Israel the series was positively reviewed by Walla!, describing it as a "strong" series that "pushes all the right buttons." The news outlet continued to praise the performances of the cast and concluded that it is "a touching glimpse of a rough and sensitive human story, full of beautiful moments."
