= Stormy Weather (Thelonious Monster album) =

Studio album by Thelonious Monster
- Released: 1989
- Recorded: Existia, Los Angeles
- Genre: Rock
- Label: Relativity
- Producer: John Doe

Thelonious Monster chronology
| Next Saturday Afternoon (1987) | Stormy Weather (1989) | Beautiful Mess (1992) |

Stormy Weather is the third album by the American band Thelonious Monster, released in 1989. The CD version included their previous album, Next Saturday Afternoon. The band supported the album by touring with Red Hot Chili Peppers and Fishbone. "So What If I Did" was a minor modern rock hit.

== Production ==
The album was produced by John Doe. "For My Lover" is a cover of the Tracy Chapman song; "See That My Grave Is Kept Clean" is a cover of the Blind Lemon Jefferson song. Many of the songs are about accepting personal responsibility. Edward Colver did the photography for Stormy Weather.

"Sammy Hagar Weekend" is about teenage troublemakers in Anaheim; it was added to album when the band realized they had too many serious songs. The band offers admiration for Jesse Jackson on "Lena Horne Still Sings Stormy Weather". "Colorblind" describes white flight.

== Critical reception ==
Professional ratings
Review scores
| Source | Rating |
|---|---|
| AllMusic | 4/5 stars |
| Robert Christgau | A− |
| Orlando Sentinel | 4/5 stars |

The Orlando Sentinel wrote that "guitarists Dix Deanney and Mike Martt set the stylistic tone on the album's opening tracks with ringing, rhythmic layers of electric guitars that initially recall the impact of Tom Petty's Heartbreakers." The Gazette determined that, "rather than be locked in by the limited ambition that pervades the college-indie-band mindset, Thelonious Monster makes the sarcastic digs stick by cranking up music that is at times as good as Stones and Beatles-influenced rock gets when set firmly in a late-'80s context."

The New Haven Register noted that "the guitars are turned up, the rock 'n' roll is as straight forward as a sledgehammer and odd harmonies run rampant." Spin called the album "white soul, with one foot in adolescence and the other in that record store where you bought all your old J. Geils and Cream albums."

== Track listing ==
1. "So What If I Did" (3:47)
2. "Oh (No Sense At All)" (3:17)
3. "Lena Horne Still Sings Stormy Weather" (2:26)
4. "For My Lover" (2:31) (Tracy Chapman)
5. "My Boy" (3:16)
6. "Bourbon St. Stagger" (1:51) (cassette bonus track)
7. "Colorblind" (3:15)
8. "Real Kinda Hatred" (3:37)
9. "Nuthin's Perfect" (3:25)
10. "Sammy Hagar Weekend" (3:00)
11. "You Better Run" (2:47)
12. "See That My Grave Is Kept Clean" (3:30) (Blind Lemon Jefferson)
13. "I'm Goin' Shoppin'" (1:58) (cassette bonus track)

== Personnel ==
- Bob Forrest – vocals
- Dix Denney – guitar
- Christopher Handsome – guitar
- Mike Martt – guitar, vocals
- Pete Weiss – drums, background vocals

with

- Rob Graves – bass
- Mark E. Hall – guitar

Additional musicians: Tree, Flea, Peter Case, John Doe, Sondra Christianson, Keith Morris, Buck Clarke
