= Shavim =

Shavim (שווים)

Studio album by Ran Danker and Ilay Botner
- Released: 2007
- Recorded: 2007
- Genre: Pop

Shavim (Hebrew: שווים) is an album by Israeli singers Ran Danker and Ilai Botner. It became number one in Israel with 'Bo’i Nazov'" being voted Israel's song of the year in 2007. The album includes the song Ani Esh (Hebrew: אני אש; "I am a fire").

== Tracklist ==
1. יום הולדת 2:40
2. 4:10 בואי נעזוב
3. 3:14 הכל מזכיר אותך
4. 3:51 מי בחלומך
5. שווים 3:52
6. 3:27 אני אש
7. 2:21 לחזור לישון ביחד
8. 3:19 נעימה
9. 2:44 מחכה לך
10. 4:00 מה שלא הספקתי לומר
11. 3:22 12 שנים
12. 3:07 במקום לבכות
