= The Bicycle Thief (band) =

American alternative rock band

- Origin: Los Angeles, California, U.S.
- Genres: Alternative rock
- Years active: 1997–2001, 2011, 2013–2014, 2019–present

The Bicycle Thief is an American alternative rock band fronted by Bob Forrest. After a break from the music industry after the demise of his previous band, Thelonious Monster, Forrest started jamming with Josh Klinghoffer (a friend of Forrest's girlfriend's brother) and in 1997 they played a covers gig and Forrest started recording demos on a four-track. After Goldenvoice's Paul Tollett offered him a deal he and Klinghoffer recorded The Bicycle Thief's debut, joined on the album by Kevin Fitzgerald (Geraldine Fibbers). This was Klinghoffer's first recording experience and he contributed guitars, keyboards, and on some tracks the drums.

Their only studio album is You Come and Go Like a Pop Song, released in 1999, and re-released with modified track listing and artwork in 2001. For the 10th anniversary of the band in 2009, a live album, The Way It Used to Be (Live), was released on Bob Forrest's website. In 2020, for the 21st anniversary of the album, the band announced it would be reissuing the album on vinyl and the album also appeared on Spotify for the first time. The band played a livestream concert in September 2020.

Just previous to the Red Hot Chili Peppers' release of I'm with You, Klinghoffer and Forrest performed songs live on the latter's radio show in July 2011. Then on October 3, 2013, (Klinghoffer's birthday) the band reunited and played live at the Hard Rock Hotel in Palm Springs. Their next performance was the Save Music in Chinatown benefit concert in Los Angeles on October 19, 2014, the first public performance of the band in 13 years. They reunited again on October 12, 2019, and played live at Alo House Silver Lake.

== Discography ==
Studio albums

- You Come and Go Like a Pop Song (1999/2001)

Compilations albums

- Rare (2014)
- Birthday Cake Rarities (2020)

Live albums

- The Way It Used to Be (2009)

Singles

- Stoned +2 (2001)
