= Doubtful (film) =

2017 film

- Israeli cinema poster for Doubtful
- Directed by: Eliran Elya
- Screenplay by: Eliran Elya
- Produced by: Oren Rogovin
- Starring: Ran Danker, Adar Hazazi Gersch
- Cinematography: Shai Goldman
- Edited by: Arik Leibovitch
- Music by: Ran Elimelech, Yoram Hazan
- Production company: Rogovin Brothers
- Release date: 8 March 2017
- Running time: 88 minutes
- Country: Israel
- Language: Hebrew

Doubtful (Hebrew: Mutalim Besafek) is a 2017 Israeli social drama film, written and directed by Eliran Elya, produced by Oren Rogovin, starring Ran Danker, as Assi, screenwriter and a poet, sentenced to community service as a juvenile delinquency teacher. The film was screened at the Jerusalem Film Festival 2017 and won two awards: Best First Film, Best Cinematography to Shai Goldman, and honorary mention for his performance to Adar Hazazi. Doubtful was nominated for nine Ophir Awards, including Best Actor, Best Director, and Best Film. The film produced following the support of the Israeli Film Fund, Yes, and Gesher Multicultural Film Fund.

The film is based on actual events, took place in the director's life, Eliya played by Danker. The juvenile actors have no former experience, it's their debut cinematic appearance.

== Plot ==
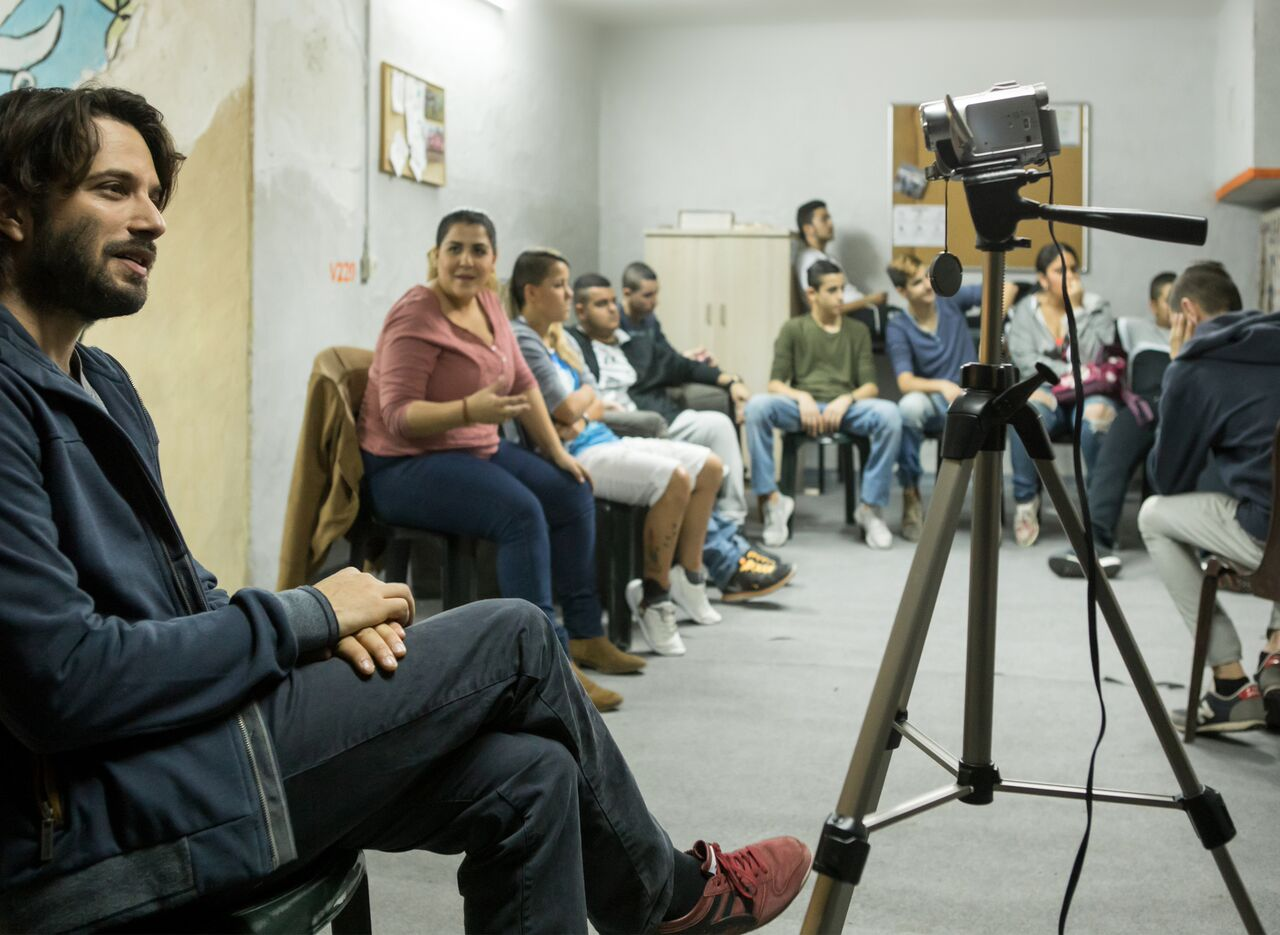

Following a motorcycle accident, Assi (Ran Danker), screenwriter and poet from Tel Aviv, sentence to community service as a cinema teacher in a development town in southern Israel. His student are a juvenile delinquency. At the beginning, Assi find it difficult to communicate with the boys, but due to his uncompromising efforts, he paved a way to their heart. Assi develop close relationship with Eden (Adar Hazazi Gersch), young man who collect bottles for recycling in order to fulfill a dream. Assi try to help Eden break through the boundaries of his life.

== Cast ==
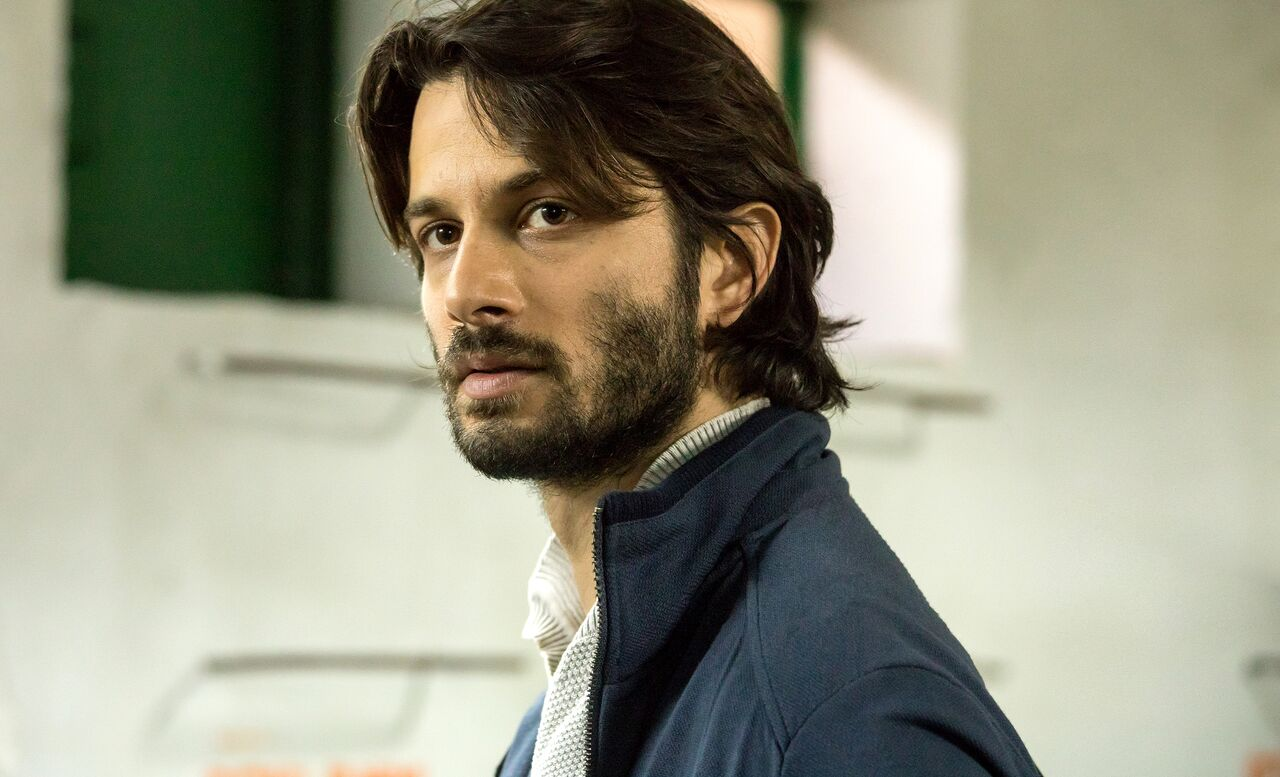
Ran Danker

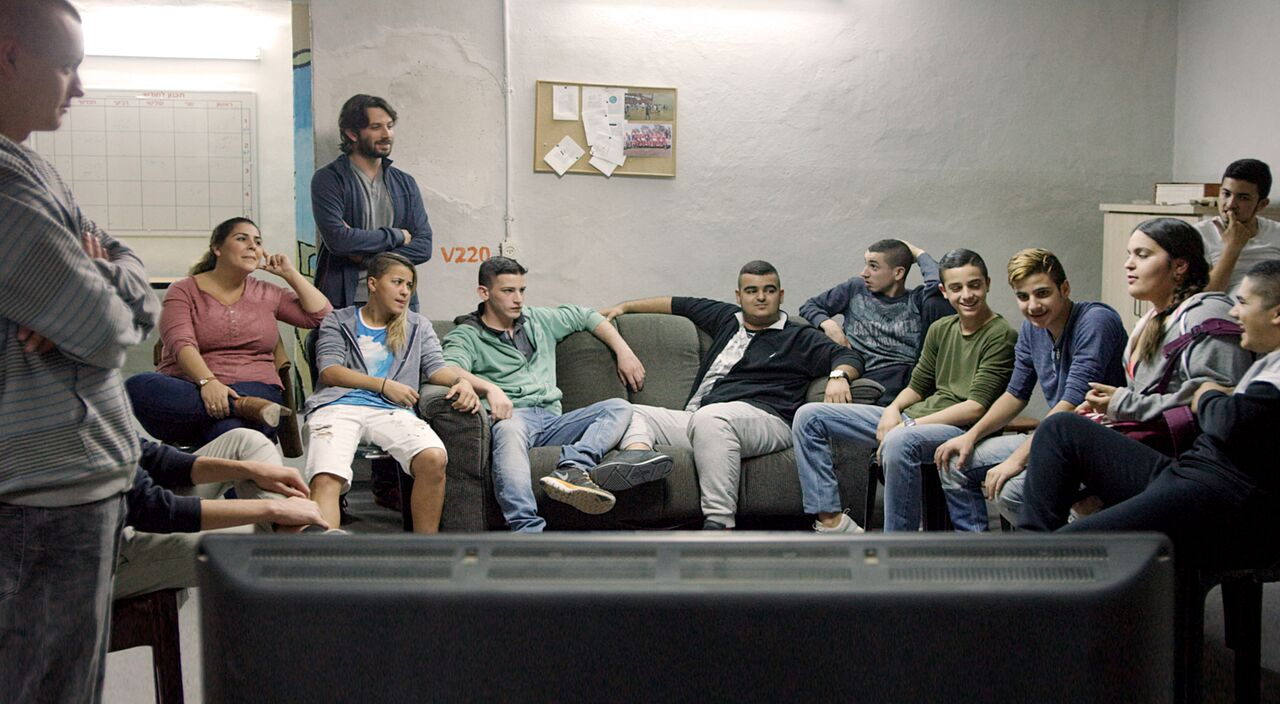

- Ran Danker as Assi
- Adar Hazazi Gersch as Eden
- Hilla Sarjon as Alma
- Liron Ben-Shlush as Liraz
- Batel Moseri as Rina
- Osher Amara as Daniel
- Elroi Fas as Naor
- Melodi Frank as Alona
- Shalev Girgin as Michael
- Elad Hudara as Elad
- Riki Hudara as Riki
- Idan Naftali as David-El
- Orel Sapir as Orel
- Yaakov Aderet as Nachum
- Eli Menashe as Police officer

== Awards and nominations ==
Ophir Awards and nominations 2017
Award	Recipient(s)	Result
Best First Picture	Oren Rogovin	Nominated
Best Director	Eliran Elya	Nominated
Best Actor	Ran Danker	Nominated
Best Supporting actor	Adar Hazazi Gersch	Nominated
Best Supporting Actress	Batel Moseri	Nominated
Best Cinematography	Shai Goldman	Nominated
Best Film Editing	Arik Leibovitch	Nominated
Best Music, Original Score	Ran Elimelech, Yoram Hazan	Nominated
Best Casting	Orit Azoulay	Won

Jerusalem Film Festival Awards and nominations 2017
Award	Recipient(s)	Result
The Anat Pirchi Award for Best First Film	Oren Rogovin	Won
The Aaron Emanuel Award for Best Cinematography	Shai Goldman	Won
Best Israeli feature picture	Eliran Elya	Nominated
honorable mention to the Best Actor	Adar Hazazi Gersch	Won
