= Jake Koehler =

American YouTuber (born 1991)

Jake Koeler
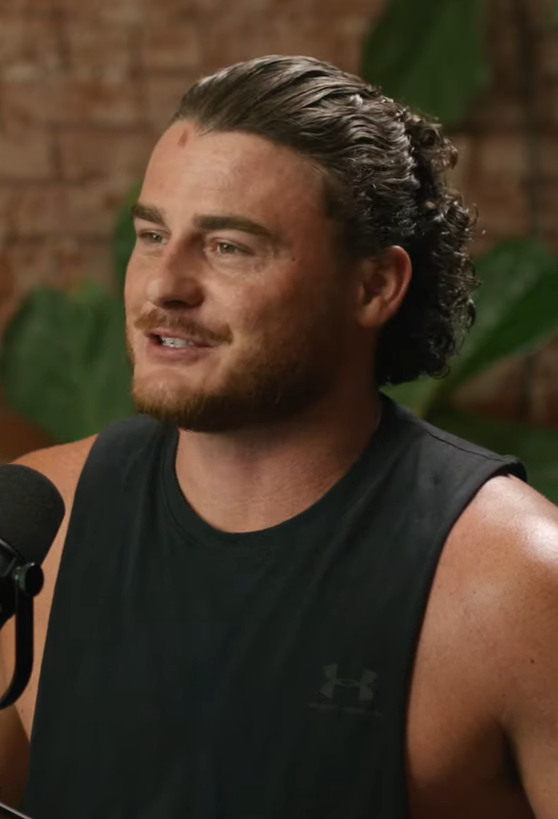
- Koehler in 2025
- Born: Jake Koehler; December 18, 1991 (age 34); Dahlonega, Georgia
- Education: Huntington Beach High School; Golden West College
- Years active: 2011–present

YouTube information
- Channel: DALLMYD
- Genre: Adventure
- Subscribers: 13.9 million
- Views: 2.19 billion
- Last updated: December 21, 2025
- Website: rivertreasure.com

Jake Koehler (born December 18, 1991), known online as DALLMYD (Note: Pronounced "D-Almighty".) or Scuba Jake, is an American YouTuber known for his treasure hunting videos often involving him scuba diving.

== Early life ==
Jake Koehler was born on December 18, 1991, in Dahlonega, Georgia, but grew up mostly in Huntington Beach, California as a child and teenager. His father was formerly an Army Ranger who also taught science at Shaw High School. He has two older brothers and a younger sister. Koehler graduated from Huntington Beach High School in 2011 and enrolled in Golden West College, taking courses in English, history, art, and ceramics. He later dropped the former two classes, eventually dropping out of college entirely. Koehler then moved to Columbus, Georgia with his parents, who gave him five years to prove that he could make a living off YouTube.

== Career ==
Koehler started his channel in 2011, mainly posting Call of Duty and Grand Theft Auto content. By the time he moved to Georgia, he found that his videos were not as successful, so he decided to pivot to making outdoor content relating to the Chattahoochee River. He already had previous experience with watersports, surfing often in his hometown of Huntington Beach and also being one of the first people to surf down the Chattahoochee's Powerhouse rapid. Koehler uploaded his first treasure hunting video in October 2015.

Koehler records his scuba diving with a GoPro; he also keeps tools with him to free himself or animals trapped in fishing wire. He mainly searches for treasure at the end of the two main rapids of the Chattahoochee, where many of the items dropped by rafters end up. He returns the lost valuables he finds to those who can establish ownership of the item and cleans up junk from the river.

In December 2016, Koehler's videos, especially one in which he found a gun in the river, went viral, nearly tripling his subscriber count from 480,000 to 1.3 million in two weeks. In 2018, the city of Columbus, Georgia named October 2 as Jake Koehler Day, recognizing him for his efforts around the Chattahoochee Valley.

In 2023, Koehler was invited by OceanGate CEO Stockton Rush to board the Titan submersible on its Mission III to vlog the wreck of the Titanic. The submersible did not end up diving on this mission due to poor weather conditions, a ghost net destroying some of the sub's parts, and the motor controllers malfunctioning. On its first mission in which it actually dived, Mission V, it ended up imploding and killing all five passengers. Koehler later uploaded his vlog to YouTube documenting his close call. In 2025, he appeared in the documentary Titan: The OceanGate Disaster to give a testimony of his experience.

== Awards and nominations ==
Year	Award	Category	Result	Ref.
2019	Streamy Awards	Cinematography	Nominated	
