= Bob and the Monster =

- Directed by: Keirda Bahruth
- Written by: Keirda Bahruth
- Produced by: Rick Ballard, Keirda Bahruth and Austin Wilkin
- Starring: Bob Forrest
- Edited by: Joshua Altman
- Music by: Original music written and performed by Josh Klinghoffer
- Production companies: Shaker Films, LLC
- Release dates: March 13, 2011 (SXSW); September 3, 2013
- Running time: 85 mins
- Country: United States
- Language: English

Bob and the Monster is a 2011 documentary film by Keirda Bahruth which profiles musician and drug counselor Bob Forrest.

== Synopsis ==
This documentary film follows outspoken indie-rock hero Bob Forrest, through his life-threatening struggle with addiction, to his transformation into one of the most influential and controversial drug counselors in the US today. Bob and the Monster crafts contemporary footage, animation and compelling interviews with archival performances and personal videos from Bob's past to reveal the complex layers of this troubled, but hopeful soul.

The trailer made its debut online on February 18, 2011. The film had its world premiere at the 2011 SXSW festival.

Bob and The Monster has played Nashville Film Festival, CIMMFest (WINNER Best Documentary), HotDocs, Gold Coast International Film Festival (WINNER Audience Award Best Documentary, WINNER Best Trailer), Sheffield Doc/Fest and AFI/Discovery Channel Silverdocs.

The documentary was released on DVD and digitally in the United States on September 3, 2013 and according to the Facebook page there were special giveaways and video messages by Forrest leading up to the release date.

== Cast ==
- Bob Forrest
- Thelonious Monster
- Anthony Kiedis
- Flea
- John Frusciante
- Courtney Love
- Angelo Moore
- John Norwood Fisher
- Stephen Perkins
- Eric Avery
- Keith Morris
- Brett Gurewitz
- Scott Weiland
- Gibby Haynes
- Steven Adler
- Martyn LeNoble
- Zander Schloss
- Drew Pinsky
- David Adelson
- Elijah Forrest
- Iris Berry

== Awards ==
Bob and The Monster received the Audience Award for Best Documentary at the 2011 Gold Coast International Film Festival. The film also won the Jury Award Best Documentary at the 2011 Chicago International Movies and Music Festival.
