= Bob Forrest =

American musician

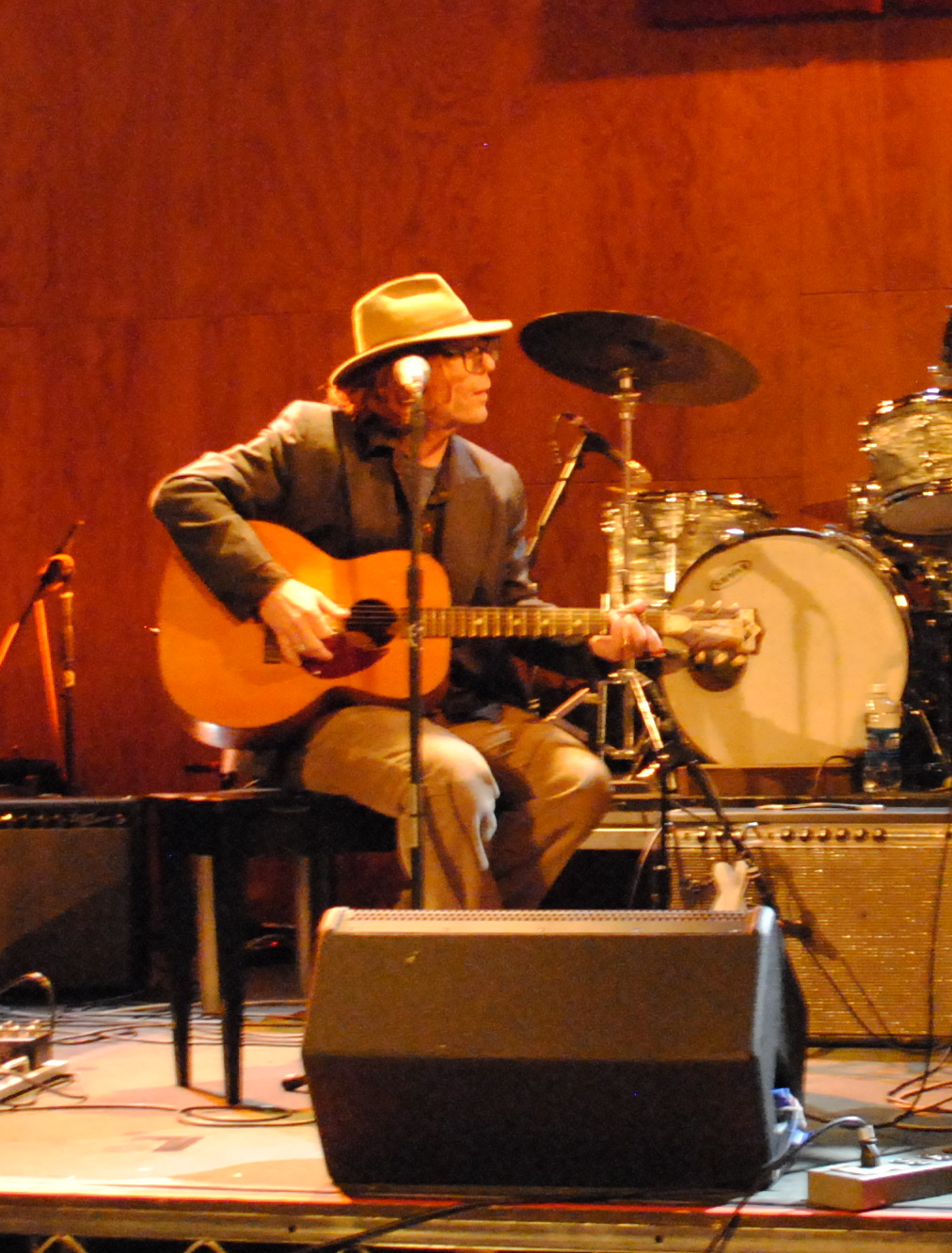
- Forrest performing in 2011

Background information
- Born: Robert O'Neil Forrest; February 15, 1961 (age 65); Los Angeles, California, U.S.
- Instruments: Vocals, guitar, keyboards, mandolin
- Years active: 1983–present

Robert O'Neil Forrest (born February 15, 1961) is an American musician who is best known for his work with the Los Angeles bands Thelonious Monster and The Bicycle Thief. Forrest, a recovering drug addict, has worked for years as a recovery advocate and promoter of addiction awareness. He featured as a counselor on the television series Celebrity Rehab and Sober House.

== Early life ==
Forrest was born on February 15, 1961. He grew up in Palm Desert, California.^{:5} As a child, Forrest was a top-rated amateur golfer.

At the age of 13, Forrest learned that the older sister he grew up with was his birth mother, and he was actually raised by his grandparents. When he was 15, his father figure died and the family was forced to relocate from an affluent neighborhood to a trailer park. Forrest turned to alcohol to cope.

Forrest attended Los Angeles City College before dropping out to work as a DJ. Influenced by figures such as Jack Kerouac and Lenny Bruce, he became interested in trying heroin. He dosed for the first time with blues musician Top Jimmy.

== Career ==
=== Musicianship ===
==== 1983–1996: Thelonious Monster and drug addiction ====
In 1983, Forrest was working as a DJ. He became friends with Flea, then the bass player for Fear, and the two moved into a flat alongside Anthony Kiedis. Forrest worked as a roadie for their band, the Red Hot Chili Peppers. Kiedis described Forrest as "a tortured musician working as a roadie", and in 1984, Forrest started his own band, Thelonious Monster.

Thelonious Monster released their debut album, Baby...You're Bummin' My Life out in a Supreme Fashion, in 1986. Their sophomore album Next Saturday Afternoon came in 1987, followed by Stormy Weather in 1989. Stormy Weather was a commercial failure, but Forrest was still seeing moderate success in the Los Angeles punk scene. In 1990, he signed a major solo recording contract with RCA Records. Although the company reportedly invested over $400,000 into Forrest, he was frivolous with the money and spent much of it to fuel his drug habits. His productivity stalled following the death of Thelonious Monster bassist Rob Graves in March of that year, and Forrest checked into his first rehab program. Over the next six years, Forrest would spend 23 more stints in formal rehab facilities.

Forrest reformed Thelonious Monster and resumed recording, but he was dropped by the label. The band released Beautiful Mess in 1992 on Signal-Capitol Records. By 1993, Forrest had reentered a deep drug addiction, and he was reportedly spending hundreds of dollars a day on the habit. His relationship with the band suffered. Forrest had a mental break and attempted suicide at Pinkpop Festival that year, planning to jump off of a speaker tower. Instead, fear took hold, and he climbed down to finish the set.

In 1996, Forrest was arrested. He described his tormented mental state during the arrest, considering suicide by cop following an extended car chase. He spent 5 weeks in jail, and later credited the experience as starting his journey towards sobriety.

==== 1997–present: The Bicycle Thief, solo career, and sobriety ====
A newly sober Forrest resumed writing music in 1997. He met the 17-year-old guitarist Josh Klinghoffer, and the two began to collaborate on songs that Forrest had penned. They formed the band The Bicycle Thief, and their work culminated in the album You Come and Go Like a Pop Song in 1999.

Thelonious Monster reunited with Forrest at the helm, releasing California Clam Chowder in 2004. The band would continue to play shows intermittently. In 2006, Forrest released his first solo album, Modern Folk and Blues Wednesday. In 2008, Forrest began releasing a series of live digital EPs on his official website.

Forrest released a new album, Survival Songs, on October 9, 2015, which was produced by Ian Brennan. It is a folk album with new material and stripped-down versions of existing Thelonious Monster and Bicycle Thief songs, and features Zander Schloss on unplugged acoustic guitar. It was released on Six Degrees Records. In 2018, he released the live album Bob Forrest + Friends Live 2016 on Greenway Records.

In 2020, Thelonious Monster released Oh That Monster, their first album in 16 years.

=== Addiction advocacy and counseling ===
Forrest earned the nickname "Rehab Bob" for his contributions to addiction services. Forrest became a regular Alcoholics Anonymous sponsor with the Musicians Assistance Program, and he formed a working relationship with Dr. Drew Pinsky. The two had met previously in 1988, when Forrest was under the influence on set of Pinsky's show Loveline. Pinsky was impressed with how well Forrest cleaned up, and he offered him a job at Las Encinas Hospital. Forrest would become director of the chemical dependency program at the hospital.

By 2007, Forrest was seeking ways to reduce the stigma of rehab. He encouraged Pinsky to explore the idea of creating a television show on the topic. Forrest was successful, and in 2008, he joined Pinsky as a drug counselor on Celebrity Rehab. He appeared on all six seasons. He also featured on the 2009 spin-off Sober House.

Forrest is the co-founder of Hollywood Recovery Services, a counseling service for people after they appear on Celebrity Rehab. He also co-founded Oro House Recovery Centers in California. Established in 2010, the facility serves as a luxury inpatient rehabilitation center.

Forrest, alongside Chuck Davis, hosts Bob Forrest's Don't Die Podcast. The podcast was created with the goal of increasing awareness to addiction. Mike Martt co-hosted the program until his death in 2023.

=== Other endeavors ===
In 2010, Forrest began hosting a weekly radio show, All Up In The Interweb, which aired on Internet radio station indie1031.com.

On October 1, 2013, Forrest released Running with Monsters: A Memoir, which chronicles his life in the Los Angeles music scene. It was co-written by Michael Albo.

On April 5, 2023, it was announced that Forrest, along with Anthony Kiedis and Ron Burkle, had formed the production company Said and Done Entertainment. Their first project will be an animated series for TBS called Hellicious which is based on the comic book of the same name. Forrest will also serve as an executive producer on the series.

== Personal life and legacy ==
Forrest was good friends with River Phoenix and was one of the last people to see the actor alive the night he died of a drug overdose in 1993. Twenty years after Phoenix's death, Forrest opened up about the actor's final days and hours. Forrest said Phoenix was staying with John Frusciante and that the two went on heavy drug binges that Forrest also was involved in. Forrest was with Phoenix at The Viper Room the night of his death. Forrest said Phoenix informed him he was overdosing and that Forrest told him he wasn't, and that Phoenix told him he was feeling better. But moments later, Phoenix collapsed outside the club and went into convulsions. He was pronounced dead shortly later at the hospital. "I still have guilt that I dismissed his worries so casually," Forrest said. He said at the time that even though he showed empathy and concern, he too was a junkie, which is why he didn't discuss this; he was fearful of drawing legal attention towards himself and others for their drug issues and involvement.

Forrest is the subject of Bob and the Monster, a documentary about his music career and battles with drug addiction. The documentary was released in March 2011 and was showcased on the film festival circuit.
