= Honeymood =

- אחד בלב
- Directed by: Talya Lavie
- Written by: Talya Lavie
- Produced by: Jonathan Doweck; Eitan Mansuri; Marica Stocchi
- Starring: Avigail Harari; Ran Danker
- Cinematography: Yaron Scharf
- Edited by: Arik Lahav-Leibovich
- Music by: Asher Goldschmidt
- Production companies: Rosamont; Spiro Films
- Distributed by: Lev Cinemas; West End Films
- Release dates: April 2020 (Tribeca); July 22, 2021 (Israel)
- Running time: 91 minutes
- Country: Israel
- Language: Hebrew

Honeymood (Hebrew: אחד בלב, translit. Echad BaLev) is a 2020 Israeli comedy drama film, written and directed by Talya Lavie. Avigail Harari and Ran Danker star as a couple on their wedding night in Jerusalem. It received festival premieres in 2020 at the Tribeca Film Festival and the BFI London Film Festival, before being released theatrically in Israel on 22 July 2021. The film received eight Ophir Award nominations.

== Plot summary ==
On their wedding night, Elinor and Noam return to their honeymoon suite at a luxury hotel in Jerusalem. They soon begin arguing when Avigail discovers that Noam's ex-girlfriend, Renana has left him an envelope with a ring. Elinor decides that to start their marriage off on the right foot, they must return the ring that same night. The wedding night, which was supposed to be sweet and romantic, turns into a sleepwalking journey around Jerusalem, which brings the couple together with past loves, repressed feelings and the single life they left behind.

== Cast ==
- Avigail Harari as Elinor, a high school drama teacher and Noam's wife
- Ran Danker as Noam, Elinor's husband
- Orly Silbersatz Banai as Noam's mother
- Meir Suissa as Noam's father
- Elisha Banai as Michael, Elinor's ex-boyfriend and film student
- Yael Folman as Renana, Noam's ex-girlfriend

== Release ==
The film received international premieres in the United States and the United Kingdom, as part of the Tribeca Film Festival in 2020 and the BFI London Film Festival in October of the same year. It was also chosen as the closing night gala film at the UK Jewish Film Festival in November 2020. The theatrical release in Israel was delayed by the Coronavirus pandemic, until 22 July 2021.

=== Promotion ===
A promotional poster of the film draping a Dan Bus Company bus in Tel Aviv was vandalized in August 2021. Harari's image was defaced and Danker's was left intact. Merav Michaeli, the Minister of Transport, condemned the action: " "This is not modesty, this is violence. Vandalizing a sign with a woman's face on it is violence, no less than that... The forceful attempt to erase women and exclude them from the public sphere is devastating...I intend to convene the professionals from the Transportation Authority public in the office in order to find a way to fight and eradicate this inappropriate phenomenon."

== Reception ==
Hannah Brown of The Jerusalem Post, praised the film: "This lively and engaging film is a black comedy that seems to be heavily influenced by the Martin Scorsese film After Hours. Mako described it as "a love letter to Jerusalem", concluding: "Honeymood is nevertheless a smart, fluid, exciting and magical adventure film, and it is difficult to impossible to take your eyes off the screen while watching it." The Israeli newspaper, Calcalist praised Lavie's originality in playing with the romantic comedy genre: "Lavie is literally reinventing a Hollywood genre here, with a rather cheeky Israeli patent." The newspaper concluded that the film has "a funny and original creator [Lavie], with a complex view of life and characters who have layers of sadness and a sense of loss, but whose story is wrapped in punch lines and moments of slapstick who make this whole life seem tolerable, funny and wonderful."

The film received eight Ophir Award nominations:

== Remake ==
The film had a remake in Italy, called "Finchè la notte non ci separi" on 2024

- Best Actress (Avigail Harari)
- Best Supporting Actor (Meir Suissa)
- Best Supporting Actress (Orly Silbersatz Banai)
- Best Photography (Yaron Scharf)
- Best Makeup (Or Sapir)
- Best Costume Designe (Lital Goldfine)
- Best Art Direction (Ron Zikno)
