= California Clam Chowder =

Studio album by Thelonious Monster
- Released: April 20, 2004
- Recorded: Lawnmower, Pasadena
- Label: Lakeshore
- Producer: Thelonious Monster

Thelonious Monster chronology
Beautiful Mess (1992)	California Clam Chowder (2004)	Oh That Monster (2020)

California Clam Chowder is an album by Thelonious Monster. It was released in 2004, the band's first release since 1992. It is a collection of interpretations of some of the world's most influential, iconoclastic artists.

== Critical reception ==
Professional ratings
Review scores
Source	Rating
Robert Christgau	A−

The Los Angeles Times wrote that "Bob Forrest and company bring their customary passion and rambunctious camaraderie to their tales of hanging in against the odds."

== Track listing ==
1. The Gun Club Song
2. The Bob Dylan Song
3. The Joy Division Song
4. The Germs Song
5. The Curtis Mayfield Song
6. The Jam Song
7. The Rolling Stones '77 Song
8. The Ramones Song
9. The Bowie Low Song
10. The Big Star Song
11. The Iggy Stooge Song
12. The Beck Song
13. The Elton John Song
14. The Thelonious Monster Song
15. The Oasis Song

== Personnel ==
- Bob Forrest – vocals
- Dix Denney – guitar plus other strings
- Dallas Don Burnet – bass guitar, guitar, Moog, piano, vocals
- Pete Weiss – drums, percussion, guitar
- Jon Sidel – guitar

Additional musicians

- Josh Klinghoffer – guitar, marimba
- Greg Kurstin – keyboards
