= Mike Martt =

American musician

- Born: 1955 or 1956; Newport Beach, California
- Died: 28 November 2023 (age 67)
- Genres: Punk rock, cowpunk
- Years active: 1981–2023
- Formerly of: The Low & Sweet Orchestra; The Gun Club; Tex & the Horseheads; Thelonious Monster
- Website: Official website archived on 11 December 2023

Mike Martt (died November 28, 2023) was a singer-songwriter and guitarist from Southern California. He was best known as a guitarist and songwriter from Tex & the Horseheads and Thelonious Monster. Martt was also a co-host of the Don't Die sobriety podcast with Bob Forrest.

== Early life ==
Martt was born in Newport Beach, California. He grew up in Sunset Beach. He stated that his family had been living in Sunset Beach "since the Pacific Coast Highway was a dirt road". His first instrument was bass guitar which he began to learn at the age of 10. He attended Huntington Beach High School but never graduated.

Martt fronted the punk band Funeral in the early 1980s. He became a resident of Disgraceland, which was a shared housing unit in Hollywood described as a "punk flophouse" for "creative rebel" musicians. Here Martt lived with contemporaries such as Pleasant Gehman, Stevo Jensen, Steve Olson, and Bob Forrest.

== Career ==
Martt joined the country-influenced punk band Tex & the Horseheads in 1983. He was later invited to join Thelonious Monster. He played guitar on the albums Next Saturday Afternoon (1987) and Stormy Weather (1988). Martt fell into a drug addiction between 1989 and 1992 and he was kicked out of the band. He would later gig with them intermittently.

Martt joined The Gun Club as a guitarist in 1995. Because of the failing health and ultimate death of frontman Jeffrey Lee Pierce, he only played in three shows. In the 1990s, Martt joined the Joe Wood-led T.S.O.L. Martt also formed The Low & Sweet Orchestra alongside Zander Schloss, James Fearnley of The Pogues, and actor Dermot Mulroney. Their 1996 album Goodbye to All That was considered by some critics to be the best album of the year. In 1998, the Los Angeles Times quoted Martt on his approach to songwriting. He stated that he was "always looking for a creative spark, whether it's going down to the docks at midnight or listening to a Van Morrison record."

Martt released his only solo album, Tomorrow Shines Bright, in 2003 through Superscope Records. Upon his death in 2023, the album was rereleased on vinyl by Org Music at the behest of Josh Klinghoffer.

In 2009, Martt joined a reunited Thelonious Monster for dates on the Warped Tour. As late as 2019, Martt alongside bandmate Gregory Boaz performed Tex & the Horseheads material as "The Horseheads".

Martt died at the age of 67 in November 2023. He had been battling with undisclosed health problems.

== Legacy ==
In a 1997 profile by the Los Angeles Times, Martt was described as "a survivor of hard times and hard emotional weather who has learned to endure through stoic acceptance rather than venting his rage". An obituary in Los Angeles called Martt "the epitome of literate Orange County punk." Martt has been named as a likely inductee to the hypothetical "Long Beach Rock and Roll Hall of Fame".

== Discography ==
- Funeral - Funeral (1981, Azra Records)
- Funeral - Waiting For The Bomb Blast (1981, Peace Is Shit Records)
- Tex & the Horseheads – Tex & The Horseheads (1984, Enigma Records)
- Tex & the Horseheads – Life's So Cool (1985, Enigma Records)
- Thelonious Monster - Next Saturday Afternoon (1987, Relativity Records)
- Thelonious Monster - Stormy Weather (1989, Relativity Records)
- The Low & Sweet Orchestra - Goodbye To All That (1996, Interscope Records)
- Mike Martt – Tomorrow Shines Bright (2003, Superscope Records)
- Bob Forrest – Bob Forrest & Friends Live 2016 (2017, Greenway Records)
