= Talya Lavie =

Israeli filmmaker

- טליה לביא
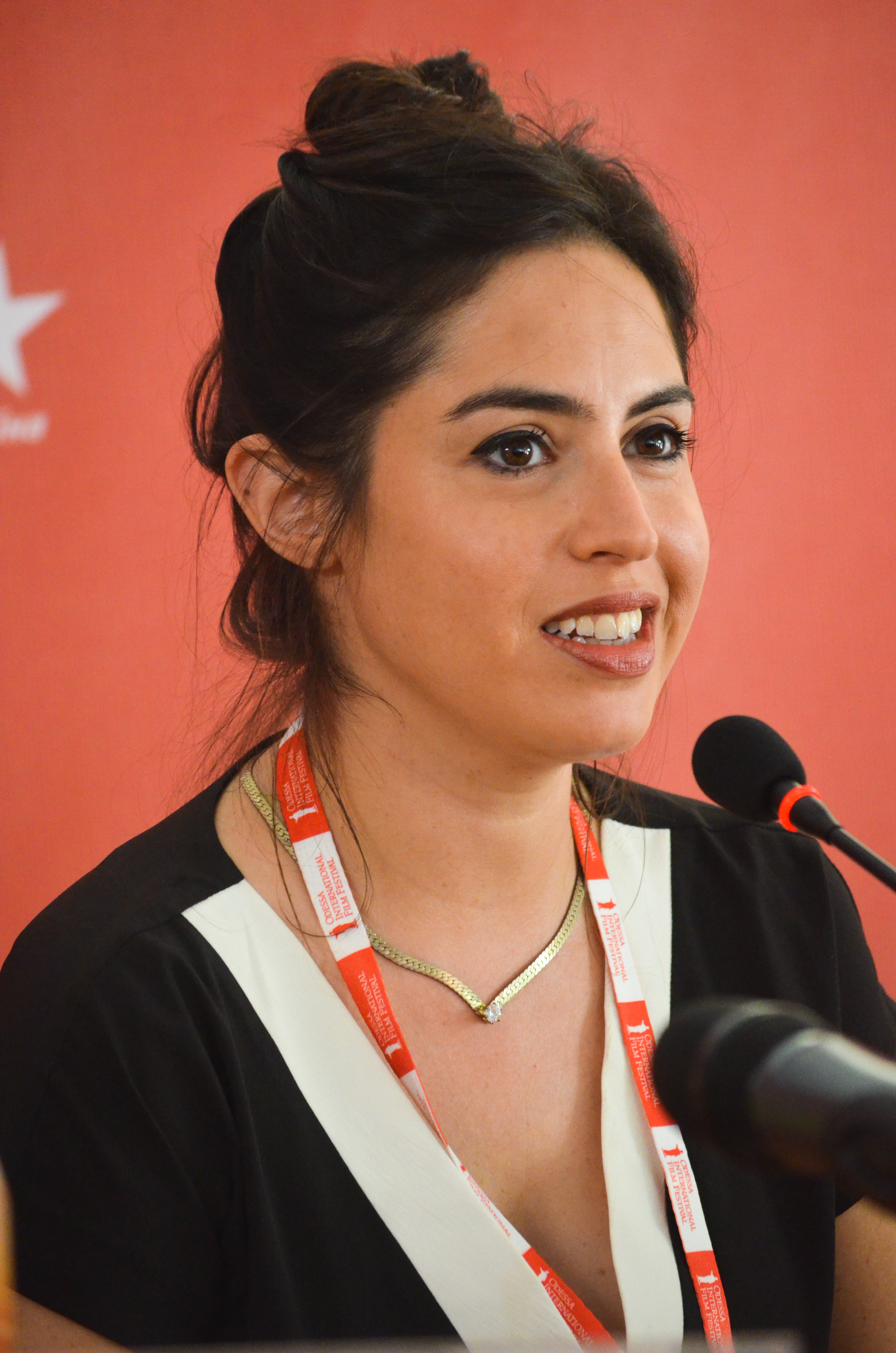
- Talya Lavie at the 2014 Odesa International Film Festival
- Born: April 27, 1978 (age 48); Petah Tikva, Israel
- Education: Bezalel Academy of Arts and Design, Sam Spiegel Film and Television School
- Occupation: Filmmaker
- Notable work: Zero Motivation

Talya Lavie (Hebrew: טליה לביא; born on 27 April 1978) is an Israeli film and television director and screenwriter. Her accolades include two Ophir Awards, for her 2014 debut feature, Zero Motivation.

Her subsequent feature, Honeymood (2020), a romantic comedy, received eight Ophir Award nominations. She also co-created and directed the Hot comedy-drama series, Sad City Girls (2021).

== Early life ==
Lavie attended the Bezalel Academy of Arts and Design as well as the Sam Spiegel Film and Television School in Jerusalem. While attending the schools she produced three shorts which were screened at numerous international film festivals, and won prizes at Locarno International Film Festival and the Berlin International Film Festival.

== Career ==
In 2006 she created a 19-minute short called The Substitute which played at the Tribeca Film Festival about a young woman working for the IDF. This short was later developed into a feature-length film, Zero Motivation.

In 2010 she participated in the Sundance Institute Feature Film Program Screenwriters' Lab, and in 2011 she participated in the Sundance Institute prestigious Directors' Lab.

Lavie was inspired to write Zero Motivation based on her own experience serving in the Israel Defense Forces. The film premiered at the 2014 Tribeca Film Festival where it won Best Narrative Feature in the World Narrative Competition. It was given a limited release in the U.S. in December, 2014 by Zeitgeist Films. The film was nominated for 12 Ophir Awards and went on to win 6 of them, including two for Lavie herself for Best Director and Best Screenplay.

Her second feature film Honeymood, a bride and groom romantic comedy starring Ran Danker and Avigail Harari, competed at the San Diego International Film Festival in October 2020. WestEnd Films obtained worldwide distribution rights. It received eight Ophir Award nominations.

In 2021 she directed and co-created the TV series Sad City Girls, which premiered in the Canneseries festival.

Lavie is currently developing Seven Eyes, a new feature drama film about female soldiers stationed on the Israel-Gaza border during the October 7 Hamas-led attack on Israel. The film is being produced by Spiro Films.

Her video installation Observation opened at the Tel Aviv Museum of Art in November 2025. It. It presents ten women who recount their experiences monitoring Gaza as part of their service in the Israel Defense Forces. Filmed against a plain black backdrop, the participants maintain direct eye contact with the camera throughout, recounting the horror of the October 7 attacks.

== Awards and nominations ==
- Best Director Ophir Awards 2014 - Zero Motivation
- Best Screenplay Ophir Awards 2014 - Zero Motivation
- Best Narrative Feature Tribeca Film Festival 2014 - Zero Motivation
- Nora Ephron Prize Tribeca Film Festival 2014 - Zero Motivation
