= Next Saturday Afternoon =

Studio album by Thelonious Monster
- Released: 1987
- Label: Relativity
- Producer: JB, Thelonious Monster

Thelonious Monster chronology
| Baby...You're Bummin' My Life out in a Supreme Fashion (1986) | Next Saturday Afternoon (1987) | Stormy Weather (1990) |

Next Saturday Afternoon is the second full-length album by Thelonious Monster. It was released in 1987. It is included on the CD version of Stormy Weather.

== Production ==
The album was recorded for $2,600. It was the first album to feature Mike Martt on guitar. He and Bob Forrest co-wrote "Anymore".

== Critical reception ==
Professional ratings
Review scores
| Source | Rating |
|---|---|
| AllMusic | 3/5 stars |
| Robert Christgau | B+ |
| MusicHound Rock: The Essential Album Guide | 3/5 stars |
| New Musical Express | 7/10 |

Trouser Press called the album "a bit closer to conventional rock’n’roll and is the better for it," writing that the band "discovered melody, producing musically and lyrically impressive material like 'Next', 'Anymore' and 'Walk on Water'." The Los Angeles Times called the album "a stubbornly independent account of post-teen alienation; a record that mixes folk, jazz, blues and high-speed punk styles without regard to radio programming dictates." The Wisconsin State Journal wrote that the band's "musical style includes radical tempo changes from lazy blues to panicy punk within a single song."

== Track listing ==
1. Swan Song (3:25)
2. Lookin' to the West (2:49)
3. Hang Tough (3:01)
4. Michael Jordan (2:30)
5. Low Boy (Butterflies Are Free) (2:47)
6. Key to Life... Tonight (3:02)
7. Walk on Water (2:15)
8. Anymore (3:14)
9. Saturday Afternoon (2:17)
10. Zelda (1:10)
11. Pop Star (2:47)
12. Tree 'n' Sven Orbit the Planet (4:22)

== Personnel ==
- Bob Forrest – vocals
- Dix Denney – guitar
- Chris Handsone – guitar
- John Huck – bass
- Pete Weiss – drums
