= Beautiful Mess (Thelonious Monster album) =

Studio album by Thelonious Monster
- Released: October 12, 1992
- Studio: Ardent (Memphis, Tennessee); Capitol (Hollywood, California); Sound Emporium (Nashville, Tennessee)
- Genre: Alternative rock
- Label: Capitol
- Producer: Joe Hardy, Pete Anderson, Al Kooper

Thelonious Monster chronology
Stormy Weather (1990)	Beautiful Mess (1992)	California Clam Chowder (2004)

Professional ratings
Review scores
Source	Rating
AllMusic	link
Robert Christgau	A−

Beautiful Mess is the fourth full-length album by Thelonious Monster. It was their major label debut. Two versions of the album were released.

== Track listing ==
1. I Live in a Nice House
2. Blood Is Thicker Than Water
3. Body and Soul?
4. Adios Lounge
5. I Get So Scared
6. Song for a Politically Correct Girl from the Valley
7. Ain't Never Been Nuthin' for Me in This World
8. Bus with No Driver
9. Vegas Weekend
10. Weakness in Me (by Joan Armatrading)
11. The Beginning and the End #12 n 35

European version

1. I Live in a Nice House
2. Blood Is Thicker Than Water
3. Body and Soul?
4. Adios Lounge
5. I Get So Scared
6. Song for a Politically Correct Girl from the Valley
7. Ain't Never Been Nuthin' for Me in This World
8. Bus with No Driver
9. Vegas Weekend
10. I Met an Angel
11. A Little Bit Nervous
12. You Want Me to Change
13. Couple of Kids

== Personnel ==
- Bob Forrest — vocals
- Dix Denney — guitar
- Chris Handsome — guitar
- Pete Weiss — drums
- Jon Sidel — guitar
- Martyn LeNoble — bass
- Zander Schloss — guitar

Additional musicians

- Dan and Dave from Soul Asylum
- Benmont Tench III
- Michael Penn (backing vocals on "Body and Soul?")
- Al Kooper
- Sam Bush
- Tom Waits (duets on "Adios Lounge")
