= Baby...You're Bummin' My Life out in a Supreme Fashion =

Studio album by Thelonious Monster
- Released: 1986
- Recorded: Westbeach Recorders, LA (1985); Rusk Studio, LA (1984)
- Genres: Punk blues, alternative rock, funk metal
- Length: 34:21
- Label: Epitaph Records
- Producers: Brett Gurewitz and Thelonious Monster

Thelonious Monster chronology
Baby...You're Bummin' My Life out in a Supreme Fashion (1986)	Next Saturday Afternoon (1987)

Professional ratings
Review scores
Source	Rating
Allmusic	2/5 stars

Baby...You're Bummin' My Life out in a Supreme Fashion is the first full-length album for Thelonious Monster. It was released in 1986 and rereleased in Japan in 2002.

== Track listing ==
1. "Psychofuckindelic"
2. "Yes Yes No"
3. "Positive Train"
4. "Let Me in the House"
5. "Thelonious Monster"
6. "Joke Song"
7. "Huck's Jam"
8. "Union Street"
9. "Try"
10. "...and the Rest of the Band"
11. "Life's a Groove"
12. "Twenty-Four Hours"
13. "Happy #12 & #35"

== Personnel ==
- Bob Forrest — vocals
- Pete Weiss — drums
- John Huck — bass
- K.K. — guitar
- Bill Stobaugh — guitar
- Chris Handsome — guitar
- Dix Denney — guitar

Additional Musicians: Peter Case, James Chance, Russell Conlin, John Dentino, Patrick English, John Eric Greenberg, Tupelo Joe, Alain Johannes, Walt Kibby, Angelo Moore, Scott Morrow, Tree, James White, Norwood Fisher, Jennifer Finch, Julie Bell, Sondra Christianson, Keith Morris, Joe Shea.

Produced by: Brett Gurewitz and Thelonious Monster
Guest Producers: Flea, Anthony Kiedis, Hillel Slovak, Spit Stix, Peter Case, & Norwood Fisher.
