= Foreign Letters =

- Directed by: Ela Thier
- Written by: Ela Thier
- Produced by: NBTV Studios, Thier Productions
- Edited by: Ben Insler, Ela Thier
- Music by: Rob Schwimmer, The Klezmatics, and Chava Alberstein
- Production company: Film Movement
- Release date: April 22, 2012
- Running time: 100 minutes
- Country: Israel
- Languages: Hebrew, English, Vietnamese

Foreign Letters (Hebrew: מרחקים) is a 2012 Israeli/American drama film based on a true story of the movie's writer and director, Ela Thier.

The movie, which has received mixed reviews from multiple sources, involves Ellie, a 12-year-old immigrant girl from Israel, and her family after moving into the United States in 1982. At first she experiences all kinds of difficulties, but then she meets Thuy, a Vietnamese refugee her age, bringing a changing point as the movie progresses. Its themes include the immigrant experience, learning English, dealing with prejudice, sharing secrets, opening to other cultures, and creatively handling conflict in friendships.

Based on the filmmaker's own experience, Foreign Letters is a story about prejudice, "poverty, shame, and the power of friendship to heal us".

The film features the music of iconic Israeli musician Chava Alberstein, who was the director's favorite musician when her family immigrated to the US in 1982. The film was the official selection at the Toronto Jewish Film Festival.

== Plot ==
Ellie (Noa Rotstein) has come to the United States from Israel with her father, mother, and little brother in 1982. After her uncle was killed by friendly fire during the 1982 Lebanon War, her parents decided to leave the country in protest. Feeling homesick, Ellie keeps in touch with her best friend in Israel telling her about their new television and shopping in thrift stores. But as time goes on, she gets more and more frustrated about not knowing English.

At school where she is in sixth grade, Ellie takes a special class in order to learn how to speak and write. To push herself even more, she purchases a typewriter so she can practice this new language. At school, a popular girl ridicules her for wearing a pendant with Hebrew letters on it and speaks down to her. So Ellie turns to the only other outsider in her class: Thuy (Dalena Le), a Vietnamese girl who lives in a small apartment with her parents and brothers and sisters - having fled from their homeland after the Vietnam War.

Thuy is shy and reserved; she keeps to herself at school and claims to have a strict father who wants her to study all the time so she can go to college. Ellie is forced to take the lead in their slowly unfolding friendship as they eat lunch together, visit each other's homes, go skating, walk in the forest, and even share the fun of making prank phone calls.

Ellie develops crushes on two boys but it takes a major effort and ritual to get Thuy to say what boy she likes best. To solidify their friendship, Ellie writes a contract. They promise to spend time together every recess and to always call the other back, and since they are best friends forever they agree that when they grow up they will always live next door to each other, or in the same house, if the husbands agree. With such high expectations, Ellie and Thuy's friendship hits a rough patch. Ellie must decide whether to reconnect or not.

== Cast ==
- Noa Rotstein as Ellie
- Dalena Le as Thuy
- Ela Thier as Ellie's mother
- Udi Razzin Ellie's father
- Daphna Thier as Dalia (as Daphne Tier)
- Uri Thier as Grandfather
- Laura Camien as Mrs. Carol
- Virginia Hastings as Ms. Para
- Ali Ruchman as Student

== See also ==
- Cinema of Israel
- Immigration to the United States
