= Zero Motivation =

2014 film

- Film poster
- אפס ביחסי אנוש
- Directed by: Talya Lavie
- Written by: Talya Lavie
- Produced by: Guy Jacoel; Yochanan Kredo; Eilon Ratzkovsky; Yossi Uzrad
- Starring: Dana Ivgy; Nelly Tagar; Shani Klein
- Cinematography: Yaron Scharf
- Edited by: Arik Lahav-Leibovich
- Music by: Ran Bagno
- Production company: July August Productions
- Distributed by: Zeitgeist Films
- Release dates: 17 April 2014 (Tribeca); 24 June 2014 (Israel)
- Running time: 100 minutes
- Country: Israel
- Language: Hebrew
- Box office: $116,044

Zero Motivation (Hebrew title: אפס ביחסי אנוש, Zero on Interpersonal Relations) is a 2014 Israeli black comedy film directed by Talya Lavie. The film premiered at the 2014 Tribeca Film Festival where it received two awards. It was nominated for twelve Ophir Awards, and won six of them including prizes for writer/director Talya Lavie (although it was not awarded Best Film). It was the most successful Israeli film of 2014, seen by 590,000 people in Israel alone.

== Plot ==
The story unfolds in three chapters and primarily follows Zohar and Daffi, two unmotivated IDF soldiers attempting to finish their conscription. They are stationed in the Negev region under the 460th Brigade, working menial jobs and primarily shredding documents. Daffi dreams of moving to Tel Aviv by transferring to service in The Kirya, writing countless letters to military officials (including the Chief) with Zohar's help. Zohar is cynical and insubordinate, preferring to play Minesweeper over performing her service duties.

=== Part 1: "The Replacement" ===
Daffi meets new soldier Tehila and, believing that Tehila has been sent to formally replace her, takes her under her wing. Daffi introduces Tehila to their supervisor Rama, who berates her for believing that her requests to be transferred were answered, as Rama also wants to be promoted out of the office to no avail.

Later that evening, Tehila visits Eitan's apartment, a former fling serving on their base; it is revealed she is not a new recruit, but rather is impersonating a soldier to infiltrate the base and reunite with her crush. Tehila finds Eitan with his new girlfriend, and he reiterates their relationship is over and threatens to formally report her. Tehila returns to the living quarters and cuts herself in the stomach through a tattoo of Eitan's name and bleeds to death in her sleep, with the girls finding her lifeless body the next morning.

Daffi is particularly affected by Tehila's death, realizing she will not be replaced after all. Daffi discovers her transfer request letters were never sent, and upon recommendation from Rama, decides to leave for officer training in hopes of getting promoted into The Kirya. Daffi and Zohar part on bad terms.

=== Part 2: "The Virgin" ===
Without Daffi, Zohar is teased by the other girls for being a virgin. Irena, one of her peers, urges Zohar to lose her virginity, prompting Zohar to flirt and set a date with a combat soldier she meets while guarding the base. As Zohar returns to their living quarters, she climbs into her bunk bed and it breaks. She refuses to sleep in the only spare bed (Tehila's former bed), so Irena volunteers to sleep there instead. That night, Irena hallucinates Tehila getting in bed with her, attempting to ignore her with little success.

The following day, Irena is catatonic, causing the girls to believe that she is possessed. Zohar offers to take her to the infirmary in order to get out of menial duties, instead preparing for her date with the combat soldier. Irena insists on joining their date and behaves strangely the entire time, frustrating Zohar. After Irena leaves, Zohar and the soldier begin to kiss, but he aggressively strips off her clothes and ignores her pleas to slow down. They are interrupted by a gunshot, discovering that Irena stole the soldier's weapon and is pointing it at them. She lets Zohar get dressed while forcing the soldier to simulate intercourse with a trash can.

Once Irena and Zohar return to the office, Rama chastises them for lying about going to the infirmary. Zohar explains that she was almost raped and that Irena saved her, but Irena instantly rebuffs this, making Zohar realizes that Tehila's "ghost" must have left her. Unimpressed, Rama makes Zohar clean the office through the night to make up for lost time. When Rama returns in the morning, she is impressed that the office is spotless, but soon finds that Zohar has shredded every record in the department and stuffed them in Rama's office.

=== Part 3: "The Commanding Officer" ===
Zohar is sent to military prison for destroying the records, and Rama is discharged despite wanting to stay in the army and become a career officer. Meanwhile, Daffi graduates from officer training and instead of being placed in Tel-Aviv, receives Rama's old position. Despite trying to make the best of the situation, Daffi finds that Zohar is lazy and rude. After she tries to punish Zohar for insubordination, Zohar photocopies Daffi's old letters and posts them all around the base. In turn, Daffi tries to delete all the computer game records that she and Zohar used to play together. The two get in a violent fight with staple guns, during which Daffi accidentally deletes all the recently digitized staff records.

The two are arrested, with Zohar takes the blame for Daffi. She is sentenced to more time in military prison while Daffi is demoted to a cushy office job in Tel Aviv. After she gets out of prison, Zohar gives up on Minesweeper and becomes addicted to Freecell. She is transferred to the infirmary, where she has sex with the soldier responsible for digitizing the military records she shredded, who suffered a nervous breakdown after she deleted them. Her service finally comes to an end, as E-mail replaces paper mail. She leaves the army base, helping Daffi draft another plea.

== Cast ==
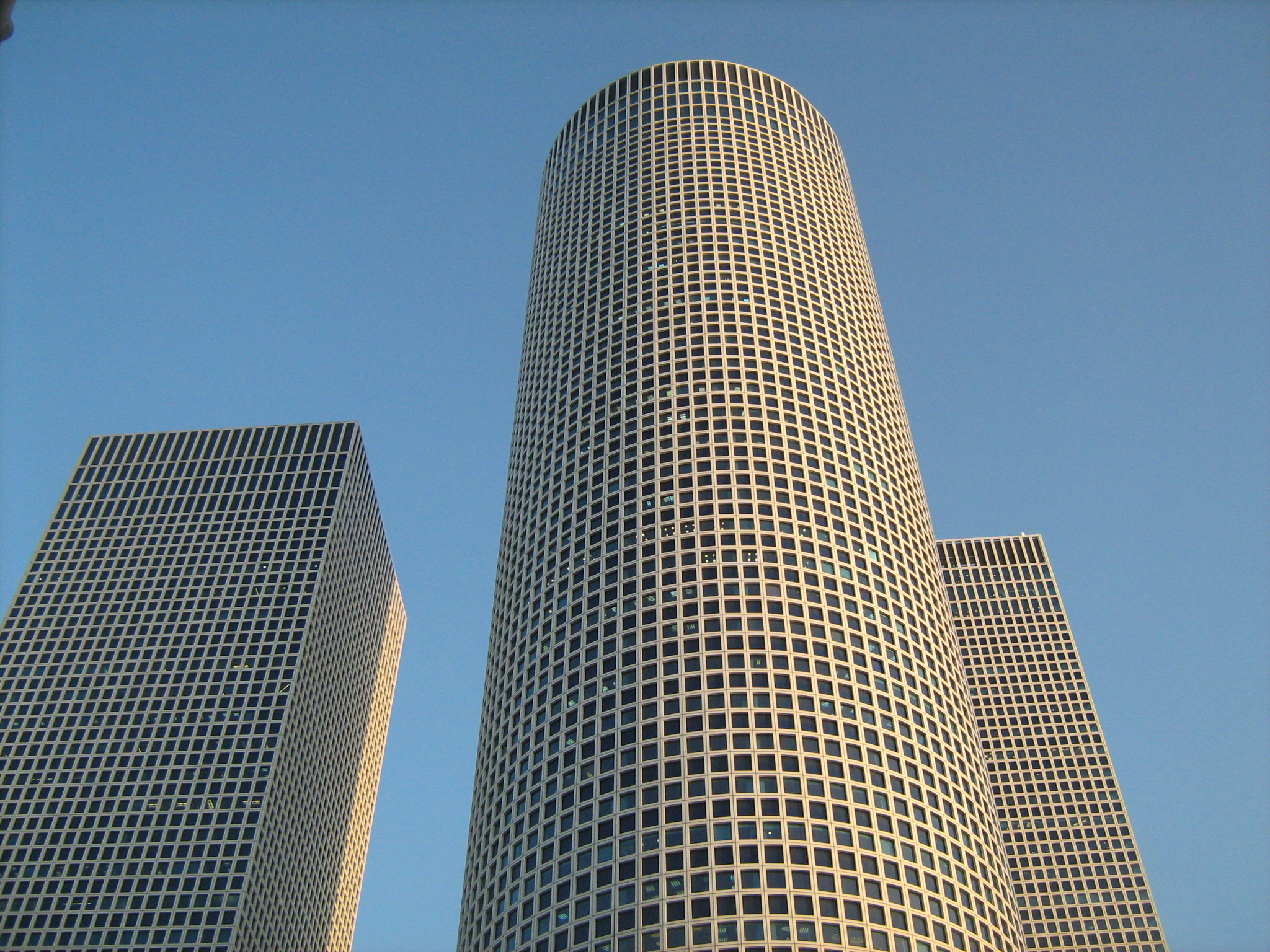
The Azrieli Towers are a symbol of big-city life for Daffi.

- Dana Ivgy as Zohar, a soldier who hopes to end her service time fighting boredom with Minesweeper sessions.
- Nelly Tagar as Daffi, a spoiled soldier who tries to transfer to HaKirya base, in glamorous Tel Aviv.
- Shani Klein as Rama, an officer trying to advance her career in spite of her unmotivated crew.
- Heli Twito as Livnat
- Meytal Gal as Liat
- Tamara Klingon as Irena, a soldier of Russian origin.
- Yonit Tobi as Tehila, a smitten girl passing for a rookie soldier.
- Moshe Ashkenazi as Eithan, a popular soldier who Zohar has a crush on.
- Yuval Segal as Boaz, the base commander.

== Production ==
The idea for Zero Motivation stems from a 2006 short film project from Lavie entitled The Substitute. Dana Ivgy also appeared in The Substitute.

== Critical reception ==
On review aggregator website Rotten Tomatoes, the film received an 86% approval rating based on 44 critics, with an average rating of 7.3/10. The website's critical consensus reads, "Darkly funny and understatedly absurd, Zero Motivation is a refreshing addition to the canon of irreverent war comedies — and an intriguing calling card for writer-director Talya Lavie." On Metacritic, the film has a weighted average score of 69 out of 100, based on 18 critics, indicating "generally favorable reviews".

== Stage adaptation ==
The film was adapted into a musical In Beit Lessin Theater, opening in 2019, starring Meshi Kleinstein, Magi Azarzar, Diana Golbi and more. The musical was written and adapted by Oren Jacoby, directed by Ido Rosenberg and the music was composed by Ilay Botner.

== Awards ==
=== Wins ===
==== 2014 ====
- Tribeca Film Festival: The Founders Award for Best Narrative Feature (top juried award at the festival).
- Tribeca Film Festival: Nora Ephron Prize.
- Ophir Awards: Best director, Best lead actress, Best screenplay, Best editing, Best original music, Best casting.
- Odesa International Film Festival: Grand Prix "Golden Duke" at the 5th.

=== Nominations ===
==== 2014 ====
- Odesa International Film Festival: International competition "Golden Duke".
- Women Film Critics Circle Awards: WFCC Award for Best foreign film by or about women and Women's work/best ensemble.
- Milwaukee Film Festival: Best film.
- Ophir Awards: Best supporting actress(Nelly Tagar), Best supporting actress(Shani Klein), Best sound, Best art direction, Best makeup, Best film.
