= Thelonious Monster =

- Origin: Los Angeles, California, U.S.
- Genres: Punk blues, alternative rock, punk rock, funk metal
- Years active: 1983–1994; 2004–2011; 2019–2024

Thelonious Monster was an American punk rock band from Los Angeles, California, led by singer-songwriter Bob Forrest and named after jazz musician Thelonious Monk. Active from 1984 to 1994, again from 2004 to 2011, and reforming a second time in 2019, the band has released five original studio albums. The band has a large cult following and is considered to be a seminal and influential band in the 1980s L.A. underground music scene, alongside acts like Jane's Addiction and Red Hot Chili Peppers. They've been described as having "traced emotional dips and bends with exceptional acuity and impact".

== Members ==
Members include Forrest on vocals; bass players Jon Huck, Rob Graves, Dallas Don Burnett and Martyn LeNoble; guitarists Chris Handsone, Bill Stobaugh, Dix Denney, Zander Schloss, Mike Martt, Tony Malone, K.K. Barrett, Jon Sidel; and drummer Pete Weiss. They were a popular live attraction in the underground rock clubs of Hollywood in the 1980s but never achieved major commercial success.

In 1988, guitarist John Frusciante auditioned for Thelonious Monster. He was in the band for only three hours before being asked to join the Red Hot Chili Peppers. Josh Klinghoffer was featured on their fifth studio album and would eventually go on to replace John Frusciante in the Red Hot Chili Peppers from 2009 to 2019, before Frusciante returned and the Chili Peppers dismissed Klinghoffer.

== History ==
=== 1984–1994: Initial success ===
Their 1986 debut album, Baby...You're Bummin' My Life out in a Supreme Fashion was described as "bluesy, jazzy, snaggle-toothed singer-songwriter pop blaring through a busted speaker."

1987 saw the release of Next Saturday Afternoon, long time Los Angeles Times music critic Robert Hilburn wrote that it would be "prized by those who crave penetrating and perceptive rock ‘n’ roll. In its best moments, the LP explores questions of identity and self-worth in stark, unflinching ways that recall the passion and purpose of some of rock's classic collections." 1989 saw the release of Stormy Weather, called "still far from the smooth or dance-happy edges preferred by mainstream radio, the album is more accessible than its predecessor. There are some winning melodic touches amid the occasional all-out, slam-bam rock ‘n’ roll." The two albums were released on a single CD in 1989.

In 1992, the band released Beautiful Mess on Capitol Records. The Los Angeles Times described it as "another series of soul-searching tunes about relationships and self-doubts. What distinguishes Forrest’s music is the absence of self-pity. In the tradition of John Lennon, Forrest is capable of expressing irony or anger in a social context, but he recognizes the enemy is often within." The following tour brought the band around the world, including a notorious set in which Forrest climbed on the roof of the main stage at the 1993 Pinkpop Festival in The Netherlands.

=== 2004–present: Reunion shows and later albums ===
After several years of sporadic activity and Forrest's tenure with The Bicycle Thief, Thelonious Monster reunited in 2004 at the Coachella Valley Music and Arts Festival in Indio, California and at the Sunset Junction Street Fair in Los Angeles, and released their first new album in 12 years. California Clam Chowder would feature guitarist Josh Klinghoffer, who was also a member of Forrest's short-lived band, The Bicycle Thief.

In 2009 Thelonious Monster reunited for their first shows in five years. The band played a show at The Echo in Los Angeles as a warm-up for dates on Warped Tour, and a show at Pappy And Harriet's in Pioneertown, California. Former members of Thelonious Monster are featured in the 2011 documentary Bob and the Monster, which details the life and career of Bob Forrest.

In 2019, Bob announced on his Instagram account that Thelonious Monster were in the studio working on a new album. He also posted a photo of Dix Denney and Josh Klinghoffer working in the studio. The album Oh That Monster was released in 2020 on United States Election Day. The band scheduled a 2021 album tour.

On January 19, 2024, the band played what Bob Forrest described as "the last ever Thelonious Monster show" at a tribute concert to guitarist Mike Martt, who died in 2023.

== Band members ==
Current

- Bob Forrest – lead vocals (1984–1994, 2004–present)
- Pete Weiss – drums, percussion (1984–1994, 2004–present)
- Chris Handsone (a.k.a. "Chris Handsome") – guitar (1984–1989, 1992–1994, 2019–present)
- Martyn LeNoble – bass (1990–1992, 2019–present)

Former

- Dix Denney – guitar (1984–1994, 2004–2023) (died 2023)
- Jon Sidel – guitar (1992–1994, 2004)
- K. K. Barrett – guitar (1986)
- Bill Stobaugh – guitar (1986) (died 1996)
- Jon Huck – bass (1984–1988)
- Rob Graves – bass (1988–1990) (died 1990)
- Gregory (Smog Vomit) Boaz -bass (1990 & 2024)
- Tony Malone – guitar (1989)
- Zander Schloss – guitar (1992–1994, 2009–2015)
- Dallas Don Burnet – bass (1992–1994, 2004–2015)
- Mike Martt – guitar (1989–1991, 2009–2015) (died 2023)

Timeline

== Discography ==
Studio albums

- Baby...You're Bummin' My Life out in a Supreme Fashion (1986)
- Next Saturday Afternoon (1987)
- Stormy Weather (1989)
- Beautiful Mess (1992)
- California Clam Chowder (2004)
- Oh That Monster (2020)

Singles and EPs

- The Boldness of Style (1987)
- So What If I Did (1989)
- Blood Is Thicker Than Water (1992)
- Body and Soul? (1993)
- Adios Lounge (1993)
