= Killer Klowns from Outer Space (EP) =

EP by The Dickies
- Released: 1988
- Genre: Punk rock; post-punk
- Length: 18:28
- Label: Enigma
- Producer: Sir Ronald Powell Hitchcock, Leonard G. Phillips

The Dickies chronology
Stukas Over Disneyland (1983)	Killer Klowns from Outer Space (1988)	Second Coming (1989)

Professional ratings
Review scores
Source	Rating
AllMusic	3/5 stars

Killer Klowns from Outer Space is an EP by the American punk rock band The Dickies. It was released in 1988 by Enigma Records. It contains the song "Killer Klowns", the title song of the 1988 film Killer Klowns from Outer Space.

South Californian artist Shag designed and executed the album cover artwork, the first of various collaborations with The Dickies.

== Critical reception ==
Trouser Press wrote that "included on this fun (if less than inspired) release is a gimmicky remake of Jet Screamer’s Jetsons rockabilly classic 'Eep Opp Ork (Uh, Uh),' one more item in the Dickies’ ever-expanding catalog of daffy covers."

== Music video ==
The video for "Killer Klowns" features the band performing in a penitentiary, with guards and inmates for an audience. Various clips from the movie are shown; Phillips and his bandmates interact with several of these. Ultimately, the Klowns commandeer the band's instruments and toss them in a cell. Last to be locked up is Phillips himself, who asks the others: "So...What're you in for?"

== Track listing ==
No.	Title	Writer(s)	Length
1.	"Killer Klowns"	Phillips	4:31
2.	"Booby Trap"	Phillips	4:00
3.	"Jim Bowie"	Phillips; Lee; Steve Hufsteter	3:05
4.	"Magoomba"	Phillips, Lee	3:38
5.	"Eep Opp Ork (Uh, Uh)"	Hanna; Barbera; Curtin	3:14

== Album credits ==
=== Personnel ===
- Jerry Angel - drums
- Lori Buhne - bass guitar, vocal
- Enoch Hain / Bob Lansing (son of famous actor Robert Lansing) - guitars, vocals
- Stan Lee - guitars
- Cliff Martinez - drums, Spirit Channel For George Jetson
- Leonard Graves Phillips - vocals, keyboards, Spirit Channel for Bela Lugosi
- Alisa Wood - background vocals
- Sir. Ronald Powell Hitchcock - engineering
