= Eve of Destruction (song) =

1965 song written by P. F. Sloan

- West German picture sleeve

Single by Barry McGuire

from the album Eve of Destruction
- B-side: "What Exactly's the Matter With Me"
- Released: July 26, 1965
- Genre: Folk rock; pop
- Length: 3:35
- Label: Dunhill (USA); RCA Victor (outside the USA)
- Songwriter: P. F. Sloan
- Producers: Lou Adler, P. F. Sloan, Steve Barri

Barry McGuire singles chronology
| "Upon a Painted Ocean" (1965) | "Eve of Destruction" (1965) | "This Precious Time" (1965) |

"Eve of Destruction" is a protest song written by P. F. Sloan in mid-1965. Several artists have recorded it, but the most popular recording was by Barry McGuire, on which Sloan played guitar and harmonica.

The song references social issues of its period, including the Vietnam War, the draft, the threat of nuclear war, the Civil Rights Movement, turmoil in the Middle East and the American space program.

The American media helped to make the song popular by using it as an example of everything that was wrong with the youth culture of the time. Its controversial lyrics caused it to be banned by some American radio stations, "claiming it was an aid to the enemy in Vietnam".

== Background ==
The song was offered to the Byrds as a potential single in the style of their Bob Dylan covers, but they rejected it. The Turtles, another L.A. group, recorded a version instead. The Turtles' version appeared as a track on their October 1965 debut album It Ain't Me Babe in July 1965, shortly after McGuire's version was released. The Turtles’ version was later released as a single in 1970 and hit #100 on the Billboard Hot 100.

== Barry McGuire version ==
McGuire's recording was made between July 12 and 15, 1965, and released by Dunhill Records. The accompanying musicians were P. F. Sloan on acoustic guitar/harmonica and "Wrecking Crew" session musicians Hal Blaine on drums and Larry Knechtel on bass guitar. McGuire's vocal track was not intended to be the final version, but a copy of the rough mix "leaked" out to a disc jockey, who began playing it. The song was an instant hit, and as a result the more polished vocal track was never recorded.

McGuire recalled in later years that "Eve of Destruction" had been recorded in one take on a Tuesday morning, with him reading lyrics scrawled on a crumpled piece of paper. He said the following Monday morning he received a phone call from the record company at 7am telling him to turn on the radio, his song was playing. McGuire's single hit #1 on the US Billboard Hot 100 and #3 on the UK Singles Chart in September 1965.

Sloan recalled: "Barry McGuire was the lead singer for a popular folk group at the time called The New Christy Minstrels. [He had written and sung] his own Number 1 hit, "Green, Green". He had just left the group and was on his own and looking for material to record. He wound up at my publishing company and was told there was a quirky songwriter he might want to listen to. Barry didn't like the song "Eve of Destruction" that much. He liked a few other songs of mine better. When he was ready to record he picked four songs, and "Eve" was the fourth to be recorded if there was time. If you listen to the recording, he's rushing because of the time constraints and he was reading it for the first time off a piece of paper." When the record was released "Eve of Destruction" was the B-side.

=== Reception ===
In the first week of its release the single was at No. 103 on the Billboard charts. In August 12 Dunhill released the LP, Eve of Destruction. It reached its peak of #37 on the Billboard album chart during the week ending September 25. That same day the single went to #1 on the chart, and repeated the feat on the Cashbox chart, where it had debuted at No. 30. McGuire would never again break into the top 40 of the Billboard Hot 100. It went to #1 in Norway for two weeks.

=== Charts ===
==== Weekly charts ====
| Chart (1965–1966) | Peak position |
|---|---|
| Argentina (CAPIF) | 16 |
| Australia (Kent Music Report) | 2 |
| Belgium | 15 |
| Canada RPM Top Singles | 1 |
| Finland (Suomen virallinen lista) | 9 |
| France (IFOP) | 98 |
| Ireland (IRMA) | 2 |
| Italy | 47 |
| West Germany (GfK) | 1 |
| Ireland (IRMA) | 2 |
| Netherlands | 3 |
| Norway | 1 |
| Sweden (Kvällstoppen) | 1 |
| UK (OCC) | 3 |
| US Billboard Hot 100 | 1 |
| US Cash Box Top 100 | 1 |

==== Year-end charts ====
| Chart (1965) | Rank |
|---|---|
| US Billboard Hot 100 | 29 |
| US Cash Box Top 100 | 25 |

=== Controversy, parodies, and response songs ===
In addition to its being banned in some parts of the U.S., the song was also banned by Radio Scotland. It was placed on a "restricted list" by the BBC, and could not be played on "general entertainment programmes". It was however featured on Top of the Pops on television one week while in the Top 10.

Researcher Justin Brummer, founding editor of the Vietnam War Song Project, has identified 25 answer records referring to "Eve of Destruction".

A group called The Spokesmen released "The Dawn of Correction" which became a Top 40 hit. Singer Tony Mammarella  released a positive answer song titled "Eve of Tomorrow".[28] Johnny Sea's 1966 spoken word recording, "Day For Decision", was also a response to the song, and was a Top 40 hit. The British musician Alan Klein included a parody of the song attacking protest singers, entitled "Age of Corruption", on his album Well at Least It's British.[29]

== Bishop Allen version ==
On Bishop Allen's debut album, Charm School (2003), the duo did their own rendition of the song. They based their version off of the version by The Dickies, not learning of the original version until after the album was released. Due to the indecipherable lyrics of the speedy Dickies version, Bishop Allen wrote their own verses and changed the chorus slightly. They also added an intro where they listed "a list of everyone we could think of and what they were doing at the time." The band later described it as a love letter to their friends. A brief listing of people mentioned in the intro are as follows: Chris Coyne, Ryan Shams, Jed McCaleb, Reshma Rudder, Errol Morris, Errol's dog Jackpot, Darya Zhuk, Dia Sokol Savage, Randy Bell, Ron Regé Jr, and Kelefa Sanneh. Reportedly, issues with getting this cover cleared with Sloan lead to a live video recording of the band at Flywheel Arts in Easthampton, MA not being released officially.

== Other versions ==
In 1965, Jan and Dean covered the song on their album Folk 'n Roll. The duo's version, with Jan Berry on lead, reused the backing track from McGuire's recording, while the lyrics were modified to include a mention of Watts, which author Mark A. Moore described as "timely, considering the bloody racial violence that had scarred that neighborhood of Los Angeles in August of '65".

In 1978, American punk rock band The Dickies released their cover of the song on their album, The Incredible Shrinking Dickies. It did not chart.

In 1997, Australian hard rock band The Screaming Jets released their cover of the song on their album, World Gone Crazy. It peaked at number 64 on the Australian ARIA charts.

== See also ==
- Civil rights movement in popular culture
- List of anti-war songs
