= Flywheel (disambiguation) =

A flywheel is a rotating disk used as a storage device for kinetic energy.

Flywheel may also refer to:

- Flywheel training
- Flywheel (band), formerly known as Pound
- Flywheel (film), a 2003 Christian drama film by Sherwood Pictures
- Flywheel, Shyster, and Flywheel (1932–33) radio show with Groucho and Chico Marx
  - Flywheel, Shyster, and Flywheel (1990 radio series) (1990–92) a BBC Radio 4 adaptation of the series
- Flywheel Arts Collective, Easthampton, Massachusetts, U.S.
- An energy storage device that includes a flywheel; see flywheel energy storage
- Flywheels, a 1987 Transformers Decepticon character
