= Idjit Savant =

Studio album by The Dickies
- Released: January 17, 1995
- Recorded: Cal State Dominguez Hills, Tiny Lights Recording, Jandemonium and Sonora in 1994
- Genre: Punk rock, new wave
- Length: 34:16
- Label: Triple X Records
- Producer: The Dickies and John X

The Dickies chronology
Second Coming (1989)	Idjit Savant (1995)	All This and Puppet Stew (2001)

Idjit Savant is the fifth studio album by punk rock band The Dickies. It was released in 1995 on Triple X Records. It was jokingly referred to by singer Leonard Graves Phillips as their "best album no one's ever heard".

Although bass player Charlie Alexander played on most of the album's tracks, his sudden departure just weeks before a tour upset Phillips, and replacement Marc Vachon was credited in the liner notes instead.

The track "Just Say Yes" had already been released as a single in 1990.

== Track listing ==
No.	Title	Writer(s)	Length
1.	"Welcome to the Diamond Mine"	Leonard Graves Phillips/Stan Lee	2:01
2.	"Golden Boys"	Darby Crash/Pat Smear	2:32
3.	"Toxic Avenger"	Phillips	3:03
4.	"Zeppelina"	Phillips/Wagon/Laughlin	1:49
5.	"I'm Stuck in a Condo (with Marlon Brando)"	Phillips/Lee	3:06
6.	"Just Say Yes"	Phillips/Lee/Buhne	2:16
7.	"Elevator (In the Brain Hotel)"	George Alexander	1:45
8.	"Pretty Ballerina"	Michael Lookofsky	2:42
9.	"Make It So"	Phillips/Melvoin/Lee/Dorman	2:28
10.	"I'm on Crack"	Phillips/Lee	2:18
11.	"Oh Boy!"	Phillips/Lee	3:01
12.	"Roadkill"	Phillips/Lee	2:18
13.	"House of Raoul"	Phillips	3:00
14.	"Song of the Dawn"	Milton Ager/Jack Yellen	1:54

== Credits ==
The Dickies

- Leonard Graves Phillips – lead vocals, keyboards
- Stan Lee – guitar
- Glen Laughlin - guitar, backing vocals, mandolin
- Marc Vachon – bass
- Jonathan Melvoin – drums, percussion

Additional Musicians:

- Charlie Alexander - bass on "Zeppelina", "Elevator...", "Pretty Ballerina", "Make it so", "Oh Boy!" and "House of Raoul"
- Laurie Buhne - bass on "Just say Yes" and "Roadkill"
- Cliff Martinez - drums on "Just say Yes" and "Roadkill"
- Enoch Hain - guitar on "Welcome To The Diamond Mine", "Golden Boys", "Toxic Avenger", "I'm Stuck In A Condo (With Marlon Brando)", "Just say Yes" and "Roadkill"
- Michael Acosta - saxophone on "House of Raoul"
- Daoud Coleman - cello on "Pretty Ballerina"
- Roger Manning - harpsichord on "Pretty Ballerina"

Production

- Recorded at Cal State Dominguez Hills, Tiny Lights Recording, Jandemonium and Sonora
- Produced by The Dickies and John X
- Engineered by John X, Pat Kraus and Brian Kehew
- Mastered by Dan Hersch
- Cover Art by Philip Aro
