= Fan mail (disambiguation) =

Fan mail is mail sent by fans to popular figures.

Fan mail may also refer to:

== Music ==
- FanMail, TLC album
- "Fanmail", TLC song
- Fan Mail (The Dickies song), Phillips, Huffsteter, Kaballero, 1980 chart single from album Dawn of the Dickies
- "Fan Mail", song by Blondie, written by Jimmy Destri, from Plastic Letters, B-side to I'm Gonna Love You Too 1978
- "Fan Mail", song by Christian rapper KJ-52 2009
