= Suzanne Snyder =

American actress (born 1962)

- Born: October 22, 1962 (age 63); Park Ridge, Illinois, U.S.
- Occupation: Actress
- Years active: 1983–1999, 2010
- Children: 3

Suzanne Snyder (born October 22, 1962) is an American former actress.

== Early life ==
Snyder was raised in Wilmette, Illinois and attended North Shore Country Day School. She was a covergirl for an edition of Teen magazine.

== Career ==
Snyder began her professional acting career while attending Northwestern University. Her first acting role was in the 1983 movie Class. Among her other film appearances, she's best known for her starring roles in Weird Science (1985), Prettykill (1987), Killer Klowns from Outer Space (1988), and Return of the Living Dead Part II (1988). Her final film role was Dancing on a Dry Salt Lake (2010).

Her television credits include guest roles in episodes of various series, including two episodes each of Seinfeld, Family Ties, Silver Spoons and Jake and the Fatman. Her final television appearance was a 1996 episode of Homicide: Life on the Street.

Snyder also appeared on stage, in the Los Angeles production The Perfect People of Pepper Street.

== Filmography ==
=== Film ===
- Class (1983) - 2nd Girl in Motel
- The Oasis (1984) - Jennifer
- The Last Starfighter (1984) - Cheerleader
- Weird Science (1985) - Deb
- Remo Williams: The Adventure Begins (1985) - Nurse in Soap Opera
- Night of the Creeps (1986) - Lisa
- Prettykill (1987) - Francie
- Retribution (1987) - Angel
- Return of the Living Dead Part II (1988) - Brenda
- Killer Klowns from Outer Space (1988) - Debbie Stone
- Police Story: Cop Killer (1988) - Carla Sample
- The Night Before (1988) - Lisa
- The Preppie Murder (1989) - Kim
- Guts and Glory: The Rise and Fall of Oliver North (1989) - Alicia
- Femme Fatale (1991) - Andrea
- Fools Rush In (1997) - Cathy Stewart
- Malevolence (1999) - Heather Jones
- Dancing on a Dry Salt Lake (2010) - Pia

=== Television ===
- CHiPs (1982)- Melanie
- T. J. Hooker (1983) - Amy
- Family Ties (1985) - Tricia Armstrong
- The Facts of Life (1985) - Penny Caminiti
- Amazing Stories (1986) - Patti
- Silver Spoons (1986) - Beth McMillan
- Head of the Class (1988) - Nancy Mayer
- In the Heat of the Night (1991) - Julie Lofton
- Seinfeld (2 episodes) (1992; 1994) - Eva; Audrey
