= Tomorrow's a Killer =

1987 Canadian-American thriller slasher film

Tomorrow's a Killer (also known as Prettykill) is a 1987 Canadian-American thriller slasher film directed by George Kaczender and starring David Birney, Susannah York and Yaphet Kotto. The plot concerns a policeman who hunts a serial killer. The film was shot in Toronto.

== Premise ==
A policeman, haunted by his past, tries to hunt down a serial killer murdering prostitutes.

== Cast ==
- David Birney as Larry Turner
- Season Hubley as Heather Todd
- Suzanne Snyder as Francie
- Susannah York as Toni
- Yaphet Kotto as Harris
- Lenore Zann as Carrie
- Germain Houde as Jacque Mercier
- Vito Rezza as The Bartender
- Marsha Moreau as Stephie
- Sarah Polley as Karla
- Peter Colvey as Assistant
- Tim Burd as Cab Driver
- Anna Louise Richardson as Courtney
- O.L. Duke as Eddie "Eddie K"
- Heather Smith as Eve
- Erik King as Sullivan
- Richard Fitzpatrick as Policeman
- Ron White as Rickert
- Gary Majchrazak as "Lightnin' Boy"
- Louis Turenne as Olaf Nilsson
- J. Winston Carroll as Smiley
- Catherine Gallant as Detective Green
- Philip Akin as Joey
- Al Bernardo as Vendor
- Belinda Metz as Escort

– Source:
