= Eve of Destruction (Barry McGuire album) =

Studio album by Barry McGuire
- Released: 1965
- Recorded: 1965
- Genre: Pop, rock, folk rock
- Length: 32:04
- Label: Dunhill
- Producer: Lou Adler

Barry McGuire chronology
The Barry McGuire Album (1963)	Eve of Destruction (1965)	This Precious Time (1965)

Singles from Eve of Destruction
- 1. "Eve of Destruction" Released: July 26, 1965

Professional ratings
Review scores
Source	Rating
AllMusic	4.5/5 stars

Eve of Destruction is the debut studio album released by American folk music singer-songwriter Barry McGuire, released in 1965. The album features McGuire's signature song "Eve of Destruction", written by P.F. Sloan, who also wrote many other songs on the album. It also features McGuire's cover versions of songs by several artists, including Bob Dylan. Eve of Destruction peaked at No. 37 on the Billboard 200 album chart and spent a total of 21 weeks on the chart.

== Track listing ==
Side one

1. "Eve of Destruction" (P.F. Sloan) – 3:38
2. "She Belongs to Me" (Bob Dylan) – 2:47
3. "You Never Had It So Good" (Sloan, Steve Barri) – 3:06
4. "Sloop John B" (credited to Sloan, Barri, Bones Howe, Barry McGuire) – 3:04
5. "Baby Blue" (Dylan) – 3:16
6. "Sins of a Family" (Sloan) – 3:01

Side two

1. "Try to Remember" (Tom Jones, Harvey Schmidt) – 3:23
2. "Mr. Man on the Street – Act One" (Sloan)– 6:20
3. "You Were on My Mind" (Sylvia Tyson) – 2:32
4. "Ain't No Way I'm Gonna Change My Mind" (Sloan, Barri) – 2:30
5. "What's Exactly's the Matter with Me" (Sloan) – 2:32
6. "Why Not Stop & Dig It While You Can" (McGuire) – 2:15

== Personnel ==
=== Musicians ===
- Barry McGuire – vocals, guitar, harmonica
- P. F. Sloan – guitar
- Tommy Tedesco – guitar
- Larry Knechtel – bass
- Hal Blaine – drums
- Steve Barri – percussion

=== Technical ===
- Lou Adler – producer
- P. F. Sloan, Steve Barri – co-producers
- "Bones" Howe – engineer
- Guy Webster – cover photography
- George Whiteman – cover layout
