= O. L. Duke =

American actor (1953–2004)

- Born: August 12, 1953; Los Angeles, California, U.S.
- Died: September 10, 2004 (aged 51); New York City, U.S.

Orville Lewis Duke (August 12, 1953 – September 10, 2004) was an American stage, television and film actor.

He was a member of the renowned Actors Studio and was the interim Artistic Director of the Negro Ensemble Company (NEC) from 2002 to 2004. In keeping with the tradition of the NEC, Duke helped young Black actors hone their skills by sharing his work experiences and teaching classes using the method acting technique.

Duke died in a car crash in New York City, on September 10, 2004. He was on his way home after performing in an off-Broadway play, when a car cut him off on the West Side Highway. His vehicle jumped a divider and struck an oncoming car. He had 3 daughters Rashae Gorham born in 1981, Bianca Duke born in 1992 and Kamilah Duke born 1995.

== Filmography ==
Year	Title	Role	Notes
1986	Seize the Day	Funeral Home Attendant	Uncredited
1987	Tomorrow's a Killer	Eddie K.	
1989	The Luckiest Man in the World	'Ace'	
1990	The White Girl	Nicky	
1990	The Return of Superfly	Change Maker	
1991	The Five Heartbeats	Monroe	
1992	Malcolm X	Pete	
1993	Sugar Hill	'Tutty'	
1995	The Keeper	Baker	
1998	Lulu on the Bridge	Paramedic #2	
2001	Piñero	Paul	
2002	The Other Brother	Londel	
2002	Antwone Fisher	Uncle Duke	
2003	Out of Time	Detective Bronze	
2004	Coalition	Walter	(final film role)
