= The Quick (American band) =

American rock band

The Quick were a mid-1970s power pop band based in Los Angeles. The Quick were influenced by 1960s British Invasion bands and 1970s British glam bands, as well as by fellow Angelenos Sparks (formerly Halfnelson).

== History ==
In Los Angeles, between the glam and punk eras in the mid-1970s, there were few clubs for local bands to play original music. However, in early 1976 the Quick began playing at the Starwood and on Thanksgiving Weekend 1976 revived the Whisky a Go Go. During its career, the Quick played various club shows supporting such bands as Van Halen, Ramones, the Runaways, and Crack the Sky, in addition to headlining slots. The Quick's most-attended show was an opening slot for Starz at the 3,000-seat Santa Monica Civic Auditorium in 1977.

The Quick released a full-length album, 1976's Mondo Deco on Mercury Records, produced by Kim Fowley and engineered by Earle Mankey, the original guitarist of Sparks (formerly Halfnelson), one of the band's earlier influences. In 2003, various demo recordings were included on the 2003 rarities compilation Untold Rock Stories on Rev-Ola Records in the UK.

In March 1978, the band recorded singles produced by established Elektra Records staff arranger David Campbell. Referred to as The Elektra singles, (though the band never signed with Elektra Records) the songs displayed a shift in the band's early proto-punk/punk sound to a more experimental harder-rock approach. A few of the songs were released on 10" and 7" limited edition vinyl via the band's fan club, and all nine tracks were eventually released on Untold Rock Stories.

One of those tracks, "Pretty Please Me", was played frequently by local KROQ-FM radio DJ Rodney Bingenheimer on his weekly "Rodney On the ROQ" radio show in 1978, but there were no records available to sell. The song was later covered and officially released by both Redd Kross and the Dickies.

In April 1978, the band invited fans to attend its 3rd anniversary show (and vote on the set list) at its Hollywood rehearsal space. It was the Quick's final show, as the group disbanded shortly afterwards.

The Quick have an intertwined history with long running punk rock band the Dickies. Steve Huffsteter, who went to school with Dickies vocalist Leonard Graves Phillips, gave guitar lessons to Dickies axeman Stan Lee. Huffsteter both introduced those two principals to one another, and encouraged their punk rock direction. Members of the Quick, who were dominated in terms of songwriting credits for their own band by Huffsteter, contributed to the Dickies' early canon, including the infamous "Shadow Man." The Dickies would go on to cover Huffsteter's "Pretty Please Me" on Stukas Over Disneyland (1983).

== Band members ==
- Danny Wilde – lead vocalist, rhythm guitarist
- Steven Hufsteter – lead guitarist, primary songwriter
- Billy Bizeau – keyboardist, backing vocalist
- Ian Ainsworth – bassist, backing vocalist
- Danny Benair – drummer

Most of the Quick's material was written by guitarist Steven Hufsteter (who would later become a founding member of the Cruzados). He played in Tito & Tarantula with fellow former Cruzado member Tito Larriva.

Lead vocalist Danny Wilde and bassist Ian (Grey) Ainsworth formed Great Buildings and released one LP on Columbia Records. Wilde later partnered with Phil Solem as the Rembrandts. They found success with their recording of the Michael Skloff/Allee Willis-co-written song "I'll Be There For You," which was used as the theme song for the TV show Friends

Keyboardist Billy Bizeau would go on to collaborate on writing songs with Kim Fowley (the band's initial manager) for the Runaways.

Drummer Danny Benair played with several other Los Angeles bands, including Flyboys, Choir Invisible, the Falcons, the Weirdos, and the Three O'Clock (formerly Salvation Army) before switching to the behind-the-scenes licensing business and founding a film soundtrack song placement agency, Natural Energy Lab.

One of their early songs, "Guardian Angel", appeared in 1978 on Rhino Records' Saturday Night Pogo new wave compilation LP. To avoid contractual issues, this early recording was credited to "the Young Republicans".

Producer David Campbell is the father of noted alternative musician Beck Hansen.

Benair's girlfriend during much of his tenure in the Quick was Lisa Fancher, who wrote liner notes for the Runaways' debut album, then went on to found the influential independent record label Frontier Records.

== Discography ==
- Mondo Deco, Mercury SRM 1–1114, USA, 1976, 10 tracks (vinyl LP)
- Mondo Deco, Mercury RJ-7239, Japan, 1977, 10 tracks (vinyl LP)
- Mondo Deco, Radio Heartbeat RHB 108, USA, 2009, 10 tracks (vinyl LP)
- Mondo Deco, Real Gone Music RGM-0718, USA, 2018, 21 tracks (CD) UPC: 848064007180
- Untold Rock Stories, Rev-Ola Records CR-REV-30, UK, 2003, 22 tracks (CD) UPC: 5013929433021
- Untold Rock Stories, Burger Records BRGR067, USA, 2020, 22 tracks (red & blue vinyl 2-LP) UPC: 634457709614
- On Holiday With Earle Mankey, Burger Records BRGR150, USA, 2011, 3 tracks (7" single)
- "Guardian Angel" (as the Young Republicans) on Saturday Night Pogo – A Collection of Los Angeles New Wave Bands, Rhino Records RNLP 003, USA, 1978, 14 tracks (vinyl LP)
- "Pretty Please" on D.I.Y.: We're Desperate: The L.A. Scene (1976-79), Rhino Records 71176, USA, 1993, 21 tracks (CD) UPC: 081227117627
