= The Incredible Shrinking Dickies =

Studio album by The Dickies
- Released: February 1979
- Genre: Punk rock, pop punk, new wave
- Length: 26:55
- Label: A&M
- Producer: John Hewlett

The Dickies chronology
The Incredible Shrinking Dickies (1979)	Dawn of the Dickies (1979)

Professional ratings
Review scores
Source	Rating
AllMusic	4/5 stars
Christgau's Record Guide	C

The Incredible Shrinking Dickies is the debut studio album by the California punk band The Dickies. It peaked at #18 on the UK album charts. The album includes the group's cover of Black Sabbath's "Paranoid", which reached No. 45 in the UK charts in July 1979. It was pressed on four different colors of vinyl (blue, yellow, orange, black).

The album was produced by John Hewlett, who in the late 1960s was a member of the UK garagepunk quartet John's Children.

== Track listing ==
No.	Title	Writer(s)	Length
1.	"Give It Back"	Lee, Phillips, Huffsteter	1:41
2.	"Poodle Party"	Kaballero	1:09
3.	"Paranoid"	Iommi, Osbourne, Ward, Butler	2:04
4.	"She"	Boyce, Hart	1:36
5.	"Shadow Man"	Lee, Ian Ainsworth	2:04
6.	"Mental Ward"	Lee, Club, Glibb	1:49
7.	"Eve Of Destruction"	Sloan	1:57
8.	"You Drive Me Ape (You Big Gorilla)"	Lee, Wagon	1:50
9.	"Waterslide"	Lee, Phillips	2:32
10.	"Walk Like An Egg"	Lee, Wilde	2:21
11.	"Curb Job"	Lee, Wilde	2:36
12.	"Shake & Bake"	Huffsteter	1:56
13.	"Rondo (The Midgets Revenge)"	Phillips	3:12

CD reissue bonus tracks
No.	Title	Writer(s)	Length
14.	"I'm Ok, You're Ok"	Lee, Club, Goddard	2:10
15.	"Silent Night"	Traditional: Arr. The Dickies	2:17
16.	"Sounds of Silence"	Simon	1:35
17.	"Banana Splits"	Adams, Barkon	1:54
18.	"Hideous"	Lee, Club, Goddard	1:13
19.	"Got It at the Store"	Goddard, Lee	1:41

== Personnel ==
- Leonard Graves Phillips – Lead Vocals, Piano, Synthesizer, Organ
- Stan Lee – Guitars, Vocals
- Chuck Wagon – Keyboards, Guitar, Saxophone, Vocals
- Billy Club – Bass, Vocals
- Karlos Kaballero – Drums

Production:

- Produced by John Hewlett
- Engineered by Cisco de Luna, Earle Mankey & Gerry Kitchenham
- Mastered by Frank de Luna
