= Three Wheels on My Wagon =

1961 comic song recorded by Dick Van Dyke

Cover of the 1961 single by Dick Van Dyke

"Three Wheels on My Wagon" is a song with lyrics by Bob Hilliard and music by Burt Bacharach. It was written in 1961, when it was released as a single by Dick Van Dyke on the Jamie Records label. This was Bacharach's first credited production. It was also recorded by The New Christy Minstrels for their EP bearing the same name in the following year, with Barry McGuire as the lead singer; it was also released as a single, in Ireland and the UK, in 1965 and 1966 respectively.

The song recounts a hazardous journey made by an American pioneer family aboard a wagon being pursued by Cherokees, with the wagon progressively losing each of its wheels. The song concludes with the Cherokees capturing the wagon, but being asked to "sing along" with the family in the final chorus: "Higgity, haggity hoggety, high. Pioneers, they never say die ..."

The song appears on the double album The Definitive New Christy Minstrels. It was regularly requested on BBC Radio's children's request programme Junior Choice.
