= Killer Klowns from Outer Space =

1988 film by the Chiodo Brothers

- Theatrical release poster
- Directed by: Stephen Chiodo
- Written by: Charles Chiodo; Stephen Chiodo
- Produced by: Charles Chiodo; Edward Chiodo; Stephen Chiodo
- Starring: Grant Cramer; Suzanne Snyder; John Allen Nelson; Royal Dano; John Vernon
- Cinematography: Alfred Taylor
- Edited by: Christopher Roth
- Music by: John Massari
- Production companies: Sarlui / Diamant; Chiodo Bros. Productions
- Distributed by: Trans World Entertainment
- Release date: May 27, 1988
- Running time: 88 minutes
- Country: United States
- Language: English
- Budget: $1.8 million
- Box office: $43.6 million

Killer Klowns from Outer Space is a 1988 American science fiction comedy horror film produced by the Chiodo Brothers, who additionally created the practical effects and makeup, with Stephen directing via a screenplay that he co-wrote with Charles. Featuring an ensemble cast consisting of Grant Cramer, Suzanne Snyder, John Allen Nelson and John Vernon, the film concerns evil extraterrestrials that resemble clowns arriving on Earth and invading a small town in order to capture, kill and harvest the human inhabitants for sustenance.

Killer Klowns from Outer Space was filmed in Watsonville, California and at the Santa Cruz Beach Boardwalk. The film utilizes practical effects, including creature suits, and its score was composed by John Massari. Despite having receiving mixed reviews from critics, the film has gone on to garner a cult following.

Sequels have been in development hell since the original film's release. Stephen Chiodo stated in 2016 that he hoped to produce three additional films, or possibly a television series. In 2018, Syfy announced that it was in talks to license the rights to make one or more sequels.

== Plot ==
Just outside the small town of Crescent Cove, Mike Tobacco and his girlfriend Debbie Stone are spending time at the local lovers' lane when they witness the arrival of a strange glowing object. Nearby, a farmer, perceiving it as Halley's Comet, ventures into the woods to find the impact site. He eventually stumbles upon a circus tent-like structure, during which he is captured by clown-based extraterrestrials known as "Klowns". Arriving to investigate for themselves, Mike and Debbie enter the structure and discover a complex interior with bizarre rooms, eventually realizing that it is the object and a spaceship. They find the now-fleshless farmer encased in a cocoon made out of a cotton candy-like substance and are discovered by a Klown, which shoots popcorn at them from a bazooka-like weapon and then pursues them aided by other Klowns.

Narrowly escaping to the local police station, they report the incident to Debbie’s ex-boyfriend Officer Dave Hanson and his curmudgeonly partner, Curtis Mooney. Mike takes Dave to the site of the ship, only to find it missing with a large crater left in its place, prompting Dave to apprehend him for his supposed tall tale. The duo then visit the lovers' lane to find it abandoned and one of the cars filled with the cocoon's substance, proving the Klowns' existence and Mike's innocence. All the while, the Klowns are seen encasing townspeople in more of their cocoons using toy-like rayguns. Several of them pull pranks and mock circus acts, which result in the deaths of several onlookers.

Mike and Dave eventually witness a Klown using a form of shadow play to shrink a crowd of people at a bus stop, then dump them into a bag filled with popcorn, which are later revealed to be its species' larval form. Back at the police station, another Klown arrives and Mooney, believing it to be a delinquent, attempts to incarcerate it. Dave soon returns to the station and encounters the Klown using a deceased Mooney as a ventriloquist's dummy before shooting its fragile nose, which causes the Klown to spin around wildly and explode into confetti.

Mike meets with his friends, Rich and Paul Terenzi, and, using the public address system on their ice cream truck, drive around town attempting to warn people of the Klowns. At Debbie's house, some of the Klowns' larvae from her and Mike's earlier encounter with them evolves into juvenile Klowns and attacks her. As she attempts to escape, she is intercepted by the other Klowns, who detain her in a giant balloon. Mike, the Terenzi brothers and Dave witness Debbie's capture and give chase, following the Klowns to the local amusement park, where they have relocated their ship. Dave and Mike infiltrate it while the Terenzis become separated from the duo and witness a Klown drinking the blood of one of their cocooned victims before rescuing Debbie and fleeing deeper into the ship.

The trio find themselves surrounded by a legion of Klowns, but the Terenzis arrive in their ice cream truck and attempt to distract them. The Klowns' gargantuan leader, Jojo the Klownzilla, appears and destroys the truck, seemingly killing the brothers. Dave creates a diversion as Mike and Debbie escape before the ship begins to take off. He then uses his badge to shatter Jojo's nose, vanquishing it and destroying the ship. The Klowns' car drops out of the sky and Dave emerges along with the Terenzis, the latter of whom miraculously survived by hiding in the ice cream truck's freezer moments before it was destroyed. As Dave, Mike and Debbie watch the fireworks created by the ship's destruction, pies fall from the sky and land on their faces.

== Cast ==
- Grant Cramer as Mike Tobacco
- Suzanne Snyder as Debbie Stone
- John Allen Nelson as Officer Dave Hanson
- John Vernon as Officer Curtis Mooney
- Michael S. Siegel as Rich Terenzi (as Michael Siegel)
- Peter Licassi as Paul Terenzi
- Royal Dano as Farmer Gene Green
- Charles Chiodo as Jojo the Klownzilla
- Christopher Titus as Bob McReed

== Production ==
The Klowns' popcorn gun was the most expensive prop used in the film.

The "from Outer Space" part of the film's title was initially left out, but was ultimately kept in so audiences would not assume it was a slasher film. Filming took place in the city of Watsonville and at the Santa Cruz Beach Boardwalk. The film was Christopher Titus' first role in a motion picture. The popcorn gun used by one of the Klowns in the film, which included a compressor that would allow the weapon to actually propel popcorn, was the most expensive prop made for the production, costing seven thousand dollars to create and taking six weeks to build. The legs of the Klowns' sentient dog-based balloon animal were coated in latex by the film's special effects department in order to keep it from popping on the pine needles that covered the ground.

While the Chiodo Brothers were well-known as special effects artists, much of the special effects work was carried out by other artists, allowing the brothers to focus more on their production duties. However, the brothers did personally construct the miniature set for the "Klownzilla" sequence.

Most of the vehicles used in the film were rented and therefore were not allowed to be damaged. A pair of cars were accidentally damaged; one was driven off a bridge, although it was only intended to roll a short distance, and the Jeep filled with the cotton candy cocoons' substance needed three thousand dollars' worth of repairs after solvent in the material damaged the interior.

The Chiodo Brothers wanted to cast Soupy Sales as the local amusement park's security guard killed by the Klowns' acidic pies, as he was known for receiving pies in the face on Lunch with Soupy Sales. However, the executive producers did not want to allocate funds to pay for Sales' plane ticket to the production, as they felt that audiences would not know who Sales was.

Jojo the Klownzilla, the Klowns' gargantuan leader who appears in the film's climax, was originally intended to be created using stop motion, but was instead portrayed by Charles Chiodo in a creature suit. In the film's original finale, Dave was killed in the destruction of the Klowns' ship, but this was changed after audiences in test screenings desired a more upbeat ending.

Four molds were made for the main Klowns' heads. One was peanut shaped, another was triangular, another circular and the final shape was an inverted triangle. From those four molds the effects artists produced a pair of specific Klowns each. Klownzilla had its own mask molded specifically for its appearance.

Two of the masks that were used for the Klowns in the film were allegedly re-purposed and used to portray the trolls of Ernest Scared Stupid. However, in a 2023 Zoom Q&A at the Little Theatre in Rochester, NY, Stephen Chiodo said that the only things potentially reused were some ear props, with the resemblance in masks being purely coincidental.

== Soundtrack ==
The film's score was composed by John Massari. The title song "Killer Klowns" was written and performed by the American punk rock band the Dickies and was released on their EP Killer Klowns from Outer Space in 1988. Frontman Leonard Phillips wrote the song without seeing the movie. A limited-edition complete soundtrack was released in 2006 through Percepto Records and features twenty-six tracks of the score, the title song "Killer Klowns", and four bonus tracks at a running time just over sixty-nine minutes. The score was later released by Waxwork Records on a vinyl LP.

== Release ==
Killer Klowns from Outer Space was released in the United States on May 27, 1988. The film was released on VHS and LaserDisc by Media Home Entertainment on October 5, 1988, and then by MGM Home Entertainment in 2000 as part of their "Midnite Movies" line, and on DVD on August 28, 2001. MGM released the film on Blu-ray on September 11, 2012.

On May 25, 2013, the film received a 35 mm screening at the Alamo Drafthouse Cinema in Vintage Park in Houston, Texas, as well as a 35 mm screening at the Alamo Drafthouse Cinema in Yonkers, New York on June 20, 2014.

Arrow Films released their special edition Blu-ray of Killer Klowns From Outer Space on April 9, 2018. This release was newly restored, with interviews, documentary featurettes, Klown auditions, bloopers, deleted scenes, a double-sided poster that features the original theatrical poster, as well as art by Sara Deck, and more.

== Critical reception ==
The film has been considered a cult classic. On the review aggregation website Rotten Tomatoes, the film has an average score of 80%, based on 30 critic reviews. The site's consensus reads: "Killer Klowns from Outer Space's title promises darkly goofy fun – and more often than not, the movie delivers." Metacritic, which uses a weighted average, assigned the film a score of 43 out of 100, based on 4 critics, indicating "mixed or average" reviews. Leonard Klady of The Los Angeles Times wrote that the film "demonstrates both above-average technical skill and large dollops of imagination". Film critic Leonard Maltin initially declared the film a bomb ("[s]trictly tenth-rate"), but gave the movie a second look after a few years; this time, Maltin awarded the picture two-and-a-half out of a possible four stars. In his second review, Maltin wrote "Routinely plotted, but vividly designed, with cheeky humor ... plays its premise to the hilt, all 'circus' bases touched".

Charles Bramesco of The A.V. Club recommended the film, writing that "The film is patently absurd, but the filmmakers are fully committed to that absurdity. It's hard not to respect", and noted the film's "enduring appeal". Charles Webb of MTV.com called the performances "a little rough", and wrote "If Killer Klowns isn't especially scary, it's only kind of funny but still gets by on the execution of extremely inventive visuals based on the clown/circus motif". Dread Central gave the film three out of a possible five stars. JoBlo.com gave the film a rating of 8/10, stating that the film "is the king of '80s B-movies and it delivers the tacky goods by the truckloads". John Gugie of HorrorNews.net gave the film a score of 3/5, calling it "a hit or miss for horror and sci-fi fans".

Author Matthew Chojnacki recommended the film in his book Alternative Movie Posters: Film Art From the Underground. Jim Craddock, in his book VideoHound's Golden Movie Retriever, gave the film two-and-a-half out of four bones, calling the film a "Visually striking, campy but slick horror flick that'll make you think twice about your next visit to the big top". Director Brian Herzlinger considers Killer Klowns from Outer Space to be "his favorite cult film".

The film received two nominations at the 16th Saturn Awards: Best Music for John Massari and Best Costume Design for Darcie F. Olsen.

== Planned sequels ==
The Chiodo brothers planned to release a "requel" (a portmanteau of remake and sequel), titled Return of the Killer Klowns from Outer Space in 3D, in 2012. Stephen Chiodo was to direct the movie, and his brother Charles would be a production designer. Grant Cramer, who starred in the original film as Mike Tobacco, stated that his character would return. According to Cramer, Tobacco now would be a town drunk, whose ramblings about the Klowns are dismissed. When the Klowns come back, Tobacco, who has been preparing for their return, teams up with two young street performers to fight them. Cramer also said that there might be multiple sequels, each revolving around a character from the original movie.

It was reported later that the release date had been delayed, but, according to the Facebook page for the film, it was "officially in post-production." A page on a website for the original movie promised that the follow-up film (referred to as a sequel, rather than a "requel") would be released in 2013.

In 2016 interviews, Stephen Chiodo stated that efforts to make further Killer Klowns productions had shifted, from planning one or more theatrical releases, to focus on television. He explained the concept of "a trilogy in four parts, with the original film being the first," adding, "We've got it all written out." However, he also ambiguously referred to the same plans as "a long arch series for cable" and "a long-ranging series".

On October 22, 2018, it was announced that the Syfy channel was in talks to license the rights to make one or more sequels to Killer Klowns from Outer Space, as well as additional movies in the Critters franchise.

=== Remake ===
In April 2025, it was announced that a remake is in the works at Amazon MGM Studios. Ryan Gosling is set to produce.

== Legacy ==
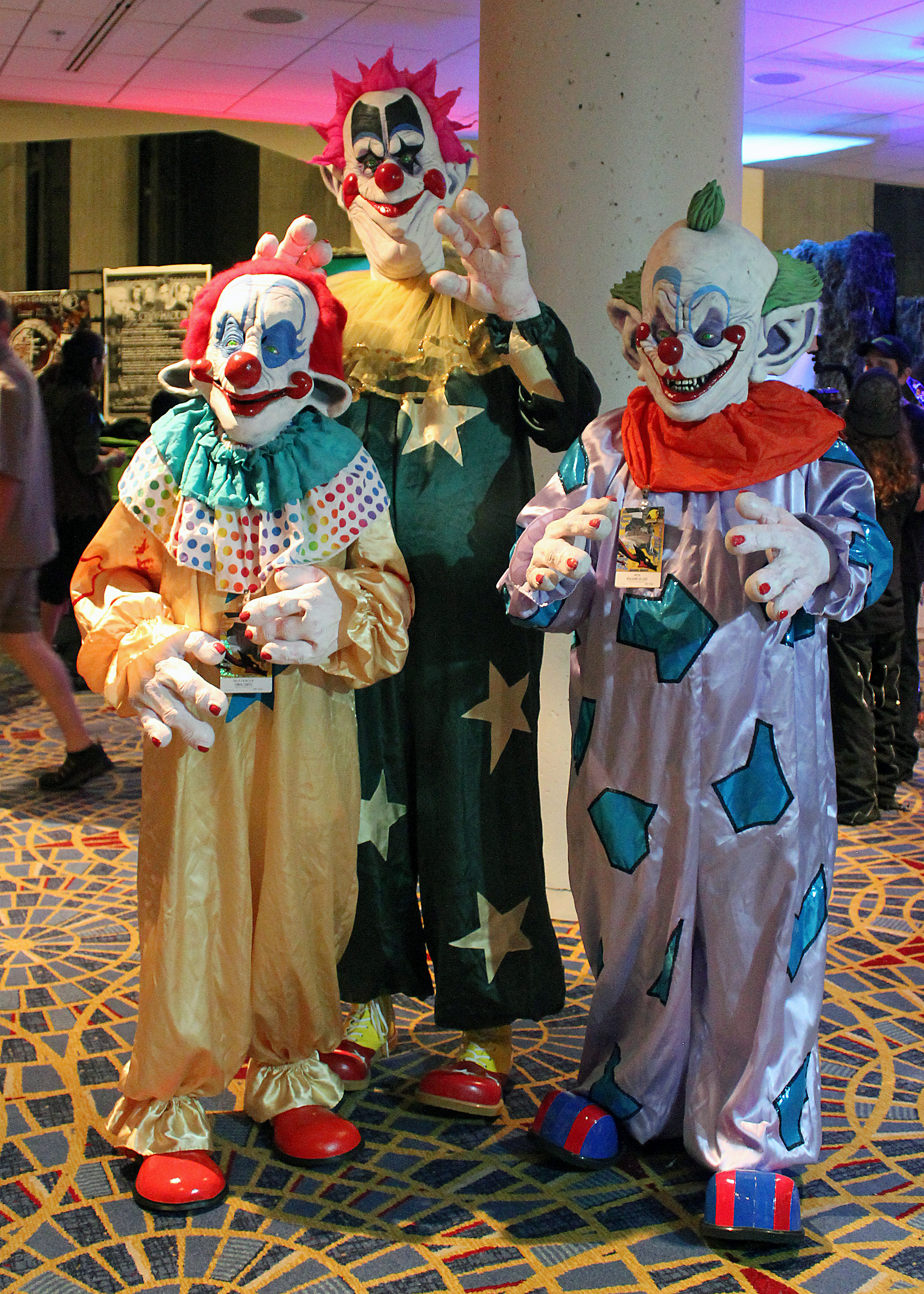
Cosplayers at Dragon Con 2014

In 2005, SOTA Toys announced they would produce Killer Klown figurines as part of their Now Playing film action figures line. One figure was produced in 2006. After SOTA stopped producing the toys, Amok Time took over until 2017, when the company announced that its license to produce Killer Klown figures had expired. Both Klown and Shorty figures have become high-end collectibles, and are much sought after by collectors.

John Massari, the composer of the synthesizer-filled score for the movie, rerecorded the music with a full orchestra at Warner Brothers Studios in 2016.

In 2018, Klowns, as well as the infamous ice cream truck from the film, were featured in a Killer Klowns from Outer Space-themed "scare zone" at Universal Orlando's 28th annual Halloween Horror Nights event. On July 25, 2019, it was announced that the Killer Klowns from Outer Space scare zone of the previous year would be expanded into a full-fledged haunted house attraction for the 2019 event at both the Orlando and Hollywood locations. Later in August, it was revealed that exclusive Killer Klowns from Outer Space merchandise would be sold during Halloween Horror Nights. The haunted house later returned for the 2022 and 2026 edition of Halloween Horror Nights at Universal Studios Hollywood.

Since 2021, Spirit Halloween has dedicated a section of its seasonal stores to merchandise tied to the movie. In addition to costumes, statues, prop replicas, doormats, signage, and life-sized animatronic characters have been featured.

In August 2022, it was revealed that an asymmetrical multiplayer game based on the film was being developed by Teravision Games and published by Good Shepherd Entertainment with a planned release in 2024 for Microsoft Windows, PlayStation 5, and Xbox Series X/S. It was announced in August 2023 that IllFonic was brought onto the project to relieve Good Shepherd from publishing duties as well as co-develop the game with Teravision. The game, officially titled Killer Klowns from Outer Space: The Game, was released on June 4, 2024.

== See also ==
- Evil clown
- List of cult films
- List of films featuring extraterrestrials
