= All This and Puppet Stew =

Studio album by the Dickies
- Released: May 22, 2001
- Studios: Motor (San Francisco, California); West Beach (Hollywood, California)
- Genre: Punk rock
- Length: 32:26
- Label: Fat Wreck Chords
- Producers: Ryan Greene; Adam Krammer

The Dickies chronology
Idjit Savant (1994)	All This and Puppet Stew (2001)

All This and Puppet Stew is the sixth studio album by American punk rock band the Dickies, released on May 22, 2001, by Fat Wreck Chords. While the band remains a touring entity, All This and Puppet Stew is their last studio album.

== Production ==
The band recorded the album over a period of five years; they at times had to be nudged to return to the studio by Fat Wreck Chords.

== Critical reception ==
Professional ratings
Review scores
Source	Rating
AllMusic	3/5 stars
The Encyclopedia of Popular Music	3/5 stars
Reno Gazette-Journal	3.5/4 stars
The San Diego Union-Tribune	3/4 stars

The East Bay Express wrote that "nobody is better than the Dickies when it comes to writing dumb songs ... 'See My Way', 'Watching the Skies', and 'Free Willy' effortlessly cram fiery guitars and kickass drumming into a two-minute song and transform it into something you can hum for years and years." The Sunday Herald Sun called the album a "classic," writing that "the catchy and melodic guitars of Stan Lee and the fast, cartoonish vocal style of Leonard Graves Phillips still drive their core sound."

== Track listing ==
All tracks are written by Stan Lee and L G Phillips, except where stated.

No.	Title	Writer(s)	Length
1.	"See My Way"	Michael T. Abrahams	3:22
2.	"Keep Watchin' the Skies"	Phillips, Williams	2:24
3.	"Free Willy"		2:33
4.	"Donut Man"	Irvin, Marc Benno	2:56
5.	"Howdy Doody in the Woodshed II"	Hufsteter, Lee, Phillips	1:31
6.	"Marry Me, Ann"		2:26
7.	"Sobriety"		2:09
8.	"I Did It"		2:30
9.	"Whack the Dalai Lama"		2:24
10.	"He's Courtin' Courtney"		2:32
11.	""Nobody But Me""	O' Kelly Isley, Rudolph Bernard Isley, Ron Isley	2:06
12.	"My Pop the Cop"		2:20
13.	"It's Huge"		3:13

== Personnel ==
- Leonard Graves Phillips – vocals, keyboards
- Stan Lee – guitar
- Little Dave Teague – guitar
- Rick Dasher – bass, vocals
- Travis Johnson – drums
- Glen Laughlin - guitar (Donut Man & Whack the Dalai Lama), mandolin (Marry Me, Ann), vocals
- Recorded at Motor Studios, San Francisco, California, Roundhouse Recording (Toluca Lake, CA), and West Beach Studios, Hollywood, California, US
- Produced by Ryan Greene and Adam Krammer
- Engineered by Ryan Greene, Don Cameron, and Glen Laughlin (O.D. engineer Donut Man & Whack the Dalai Lama)
