= Barry McGuire =

American singer-songwriter (born 1935)

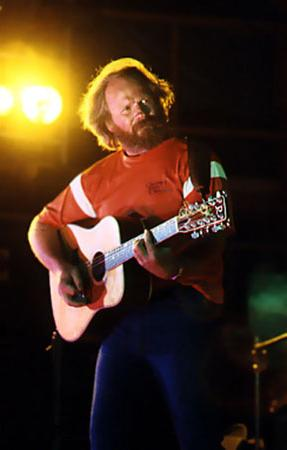
- McGuire performing live in 1979

Background information
- Born: October 15, 1935 (age 90); Oklahoma City, Oklahoma, United States
- Genres: Rock; CCM
- Occupation: Singer-songwriter
- Instruments: Vocals; guitar; harmonica
- Years active: 1960–present
- Labels: Horizon; Ember; Dunhill; Ode; Myrrh; Sparrow
- Website: barrymcguire.com

Barry McGuire (born October 15, 1935) is an American singer-songwriter primarily known for his 1965 hit "Eve of Destruction". He was later a singer and songwriter of contemporary Christian music.

== Early life ==
McGuire was born in Oklahoma City; his family moved to California when he was two years old. After working as a commercial fisherman and a journeyman pipefitter, McGuire began singing in a bar. In 1961 he released his first single, "The Tree", which was not a hit.

McGuire formed a duo with Barry Kane (d. 2013) called Barry & Barry. They performed original folk songs at The Ice House, a small folk club in Pasadena, California, before moving to The Troubadour in Hollywood in the spring of 1962. There they joined the folk group the New Christy Minstrels, and McGuire sang lead vocals on the novelty single "Three Wheels on My Wagon".

McGuire and Kane continued to perform their duo act as well as playing with the New Christy Minstrels. With Horizon Records, they cut their first and only album as Barry & Barry, titled Here and Now, which contained songs such as "Gold Wedding Ring", "Land of Odin", "Another Man" (released as a single), "Summer's Over", "You Know My Name", "Bull 'Gine Run", and "Far Side of the Hill". It also included a cover of "If I Had a Hammer", three months after the release of the hit version by folk trio Peter, Paul and Mary.

In 1963 McGuire, with Randy Sparks (founder of the New Christy Minstrels), co-wrote and sang lead vocal on the band's first and biggest hit single, "Green, Green". McGuire left the Christys in January 1965 after recording the album Cowboys and Indians, although on the 1965 album Chim Chim Cher-ee he sang on the title cut.

== Solo career ==
As a solo folk rock singer in the 1960s, McGuire was best known for his hit "Eve of Destruction" and for "Sins of a Family", both written by P. F. Sloan. McGuire's other chart successes included "Child of Our Times" and "Cloudy Summer Afternoon (Raindrops)" (written by Travis Edmonson of the 1960s folk-duo Bud & Travis). "Eve of Destruction" sold more than one million copies and was awarded a gold disc. The album Eve of Destruction peaked at No. 37 on the Billboard 200 album chart during the week ending September 25, 1965. That same week the single went to No. 1 on both the Cashbox and Billboard Hot 100 chart and knocked "Help!" by the Beatles from the top of the chart. According to McGuire, "Eve of Destruction" was recorded in one take on a Thursday morning from words scrawled on a crumpled piece of paper, and he received a call from the record company at 7am the following Monday telling him to turn on the radio because his song was playing. The recording included an "ahhh" where McGuire could not read the words. "Eve of Destruction" was McGuire's only Top 40 entry.

McGuire's second album, This Precious Time, was released in February 1966 on Dunhill Records. The album included a version of "California Dreamin'" with the Mamas & the Papas singing backing vocals. McGuire is mentioned several times in the Mamas & the Papas' hit song "Creeque Alley". The Temptations referenced McGuire's "Eve of Destruction" in their song "Ball of Confusion (That's What the World Is Today)". Frank Zappa included McGuire's name on the sleeve of his Freak Out! album (1966) as one of his musical influences.

McGuire appeared in the 1967 film The President's Analyst with James Coburn as the character "Old Wrangler", the leader of a band which consisted of the Los Angeles group Clear Light, who were between lead vocalists; and in Werewolves on Wheels in 1971. In 1968 he starred for a year in the Broadway musical Hair.

McGuire became a born-again Christian in 1971 after meeting evangelist Arthur Blessitt in October 1970. In 1973, he joined the Myrrh label and released the album Seeds, which contained backing vocals by the family trio that would become known as the 2nd Chapter of Acts. In 1974, McGuire released his second Jesus music album, Lighten Up, which included a remake of "Eve of Destruction". He toured with 2nd Chapter of Acts and A Band Called David, and in 1975 this collaborative effort resulted in the double live album To the Bride.

In 1976, McGuire left Myrrh and joined former Myrrh executive Billy Ray Hearn's new label, Sparrow Records. He recorded seven albums on Sparrow, the best known of which is Cosmic Cowboy, released in 1978. The title track was No. 1 on CCM Magazine's music chart for 35 weeks. That year McGuire also released a children's album, Bullfrogs and Butterflies, part of the Agapeland series, for Sparrow's subsidiary label Birdwing. In 1978, McGuire toured England, Scotland, and Wales with the Jimmy Owens musical The Witness, in which he played the part of the apostle Peter. He also played this part on the studio recording of The Witness.

In 1985, McGuire was featured in the contemporary musical recording The Scroll, performing the character of Jesus. The musical was composed by Canadian singer/songwriter Bruce Stacey and was recorded in England with the National Philharmonic Orchestra. It also featured other contemporary Christian artists of the day. The Scroll was released on Light Records and was featured at three world exhibitions as a major multi-media presentation.

== Later life ==
In the 1980s, after his final album Pilgrim, McGuire left the music industry and settled for a time in New Zealand with his wife, Mari. He wrote music, performed and hosted the videos for several years for Gospel Light Publishing's Vacation Bible school programs. McGuire returned to the United States in the 1990s and teamed up with Terry Talbot (brother of Christian musician John Michael Talbot). Recording as Talbot McGuire, the duo released four albums between 1996 and 2000. In 1990 McGuire published the novel In the Midst of Wolves, co-written with Logan White, which told the story of "a group of bikers who came to know God". McGuire worked with The New Mamas and the Papas in 1997–1998. In 2000 he toured with John Michael Talbot. In 2006, McGuire undertook engagements which included songs and talks on a mixture of topics by McGuire and his wife. The McGuires resided in Fresno, California, but also spent part of every year in New Zealand.

On March 12, 2008, McGuire appeared on the Australian music comedy/game show Spicks and Specks, performing an updated version of "Eve of Destruction" with new lines such as "You're old enough to kill / you just started voting" and "... can live for ten years in space". A reference to "Red China" was removed. In 2009, McGuire released "Eve 2012", in which the text was modified to reflect contemporary problems, mostly environmental, rather than the issues prominent in the 1960s.

In 2008, McGuire joined a former member of the Byrds, John York, for a live tour called Trippin' the '60s, which McGuire described as "taking the songs and the truth that was in those songs from the 1960s and bringing them into the present moment... It's not a cover pack, it's us singing songs that we sung [sic] with a lot of our friends that aren't around anymore to sing them."

In 2013, McGuire appeared in the documentary film The Byrd Who Flew Alone, produced by Four Suns Productions. The film was about Gene Clark, one of the original Byrds, who was a friend of McGuire's for many years.

== Partial discography ==
=== Albums ===
- 1963: The Barry McGuire Album
- 1965: Eve of Destruction (No. 37. US)
- 1965: This Precious Time
- 1968: The World's Last Private Citizen
- 1970: Barry McGuire & the Doctor
- 1972: Seeds
- 1974: Lighten Up
- 1974: Narnia
- 1975: Jubilation
- 1975: To the Bride
- 1975: Eve of Destruction (Star Power)
- 1976: C'mon Along
- 1976: Anyone But Jesus
- 1976: Jubilation Two Headed Stranger
- 1977: Have You Heard
- 1978: Cosmic Cowboy
- 1979: Inside Out
- 1980: The Polka Dot Bear - The Story of Creation
- 1980: Best of Barry McGuire
- 1981: Finer Than Gold
- 1989: Pilgrim
- 1991: Let's Tend God's Earth
- 1995: When Dinosaurs Walked the Earth
- 1997: Ancient Garden
- 1999: Frost and Fire
- 2000: Eve of Destruction (20 Inspirational Classics)

=== Charting singles ===
Year	Song	Peak chart positions							Album
Year	Song	US	CA	NO	NL	UK	DE	BE	Album
1965	"Eve of Destruction"	1	1	1	3	3	6	15	Eve of Destruction
1965	"Child of Our Times"	72	—	—	—	—	—	—	This Precious Time
1966	"Cloudy Summer Afternoon (Raindrops)"	62	23	—	—	—	—	—	The World's Last Private Citizen

== See also ==
- List of 1970s Christian pop artists
- List of artists who reached number one on the Hot 100 (U.S.)
- List of 1960s one-hit wonders in the United States
- List of: Billboard Hot 100 number ones of 1965
