= Second Coming (Dickies album) =

Studio album by The Dickies
- Released: 1989
- Genre: Punk rock, pop punk
- Label: Enigma
- Producer: Ron Hitchcock

The Dickies chronology
Killer Klowns From Outer Space (1988)	Second Coming (1989)	Idjit Savant (1994)

Professional ratings
Review scores
Source	Rating
AllMusic	3.5/5 stars
Hi-Fi News & Record Review	A:1*

Second Coming is the fourth studio album by punk band The Dickies. The album contained covers of "Hair" and Gene Pitney's "Town Without Pity."

In 2007, the album was re-released by Captain Oi!, with the Killer Klowns From Outer Space EP as bonus tracks.

== Critical reception ==
Trouser Press wrote that "while hardly the promised resurrection, Second Coming is still a perfectly (dis)respectable showing from one of our national treasures." Alternative Rock wrote that the band was "bitingly, ferociously back to (near) best."

== Track listing ==
No.	Title	Writer(s)	Length
1.	"Hair"	Galt MacDermot/James Rado/Gerome Ragni	3:40
2.	"Monster Island"	Leonard Graves Phillips/Stan Lee/Enoch Hain	2:16
3.	"Town Without Pity"	Dimitri Tiomkin/Ned Washington	3:12
4.	"Cross Eyed Tammy"	Phillips/Lee	3:04
5.	"Going Homo"	Phillips	2:54
6.	"Dummy Up"	Phillips	4:26
7.	"Booby Trap"	Phillips	4:02
8.	"Magoomba II"	Phillips/Lee	4:34
9.	"Caligula"	Phillips	6:07
10.	"I'm Stan"	Phillips/Lee	2:13
11.	"Monkey See, Monkey Do"	Phillips	4:19

Captain Oi! bonus tracks
No.	Title	Writer(s)	Length
12.	"Killer Klowns"	Phillips	4:33
13.	"Booby Trap" (single version)	Phillips	4:00
14.	"Jim Bowie"	Phillips/Lee/Steve Hufsteter	3:05
15.	"Magoomba"	Phillips/Lee	3:38
16.	"Eep Opp Ork (Uh, Uh)"	William Hanna/Joe Barbera/Hoyt Curtain	3:14

== Credits ==
The Dickies

- Leonard Graves Phillips - lead vocals, keyboards
- Stan Lee - guitars, vocals
- Enoch Hain - guitars, vocals
- Lorenzo "Laurie" Buhne - bass, vocals
- Cliff Martinez - drums

Additional musicians

- Jerry Angel - drums
- Lenny Castro - percussion
- John "Juke" Logan - harmonica
- Larry Klimas - flute

Production

- Produced and Engineered by Ron Hitchcock
- Additional Engineering by Jim Faraci, John X and Brian Fukuji
- Cover Painting by Jeff Wong
