= World Gone Crazy =

World Gone Crazy may refer to:

- World Gone Crazy (The Screaming Jets album)
- World Gone Crazy (The Doobie Brothers album)
