= Stukas Over Disneyland =

1983 studio album by The Dickies

Studio album by The Dickies
- Released: 1983
- Genre: Punk rock
- Length: 20:28 (original); 26:56 (reissue)
- Label: PVC
- Producer: Robin Geoffrey Cable, Ed Stasium

The Dickies chronology
| Dawn of the Dickies (1979) | Stukas Over Disneyland (1983) | Killer Klowns From Outer Space (1988) |

Professional ratings
Review scores
| Source | Rating |
|---|---|
| AllMusic | 3/5 stars |

Stukas Over Disneyland is the third studio album by punk rock band The Dickies, released in 1983.

The album includes covers of The Quick's "Pretty Please Me" and Led Zeppelin's "Communication Breakdown." The cover art illustrates the album's title by showing a Stuka dive bomber over the head of Mickey Mouse.

== Critical reception ==
Reviewer Steve Spinali of Maximum Rocknroll commented positively on the original 1984 release with "The DICKIES' first vinyl in almost four years ranks up there near their previous funnypunk triumphs. Most of the eight songs here veer toward amphetamine pop, with irresistible layered choruses to boot, but the highlights include the poppish 'Rosemary,' 'She's a Hunchback,' and an incredibly fast cover of LED ZEP's 'Communication Breakdown.' Buoyant and entertaining as hell!"

== Track listing ==
Original issue
| No. | Title | Writer(s) | Length |
|---|---|---|---|
| 1. | "Rosemary" | Phillips | 2:08 |
| 2. | "She's a Hunchback" | Phillips, Lee | 1:24 |
| 3. | "Out of Sight, Out of Mind" | Phillips, Lee | 2:14 |
| 4. | "Communication Breakdown" (Led Zeppelin cover) | Jimmy Page, Robert Plant | 2:02 |
| 5. | "Pretty Please Me" (The Quick cover) | Steve Huffsteter | 3:32 |
| 6. | "Wagon Train" | Leonard Graves Phillips, Huffsteter | 3:08 |
| 7. | "If Stuart Could Talk" | Phillips, Huffsteter | 2:28 |
| 8. | "Stukas Over Disneyland" | Phillips, Stan Lee, Huffsteter, Billy Club | 3:12 |

Restless Records reissue
| No. | Title | Writer(s) | Length |
|---|---|---|---|
| 1. | "Pretty Please Me" |
| 2. | "Wagon Train" |
| 3. | "If Stuart Could Talk" |
| 4. | "Stukas Over Disneyland" |
| 5. | "I'm Okay, You're Okay" (Live) | Lee, S. Goddard, Phillips |
| 6. | "Bedrock Barney" (Live) | Phillips, Lee |
| 7. | "Gigantor" (Live) | Eugene Raskin, Louis C. Singer |
| 8. | "Rosemary" |
| 9. | "She's a Hunchback" |
| 10. | "Out of Sight, Out of Mind" |
| 11. | "Communication Breakdown" |

== Personnel ==
- Leonard Graves Phillips - Lead vocals on all tracks
- Stan Lee - Guitar on all tracks
- Billy Club - Bass on tracks 1–4 (original issue) and tracks 5–7 (reissue)
- Laurie Buhne - Bass and vocals on tracks 5–8 (original issue)
- Scott Sindon - Guitar and vocals on tracks 1–4 (original issue)
- Steve Hufsteter - Guitar on tracks 6–8 (original issue)
- Chuck Wagon - Drums on tracks 1, 2 and 4 (original issue); guitar on tracks 5–7 (reissue)
- Karlos Kaballero - Drums on track 3 (original issue) and tracks 5–7 (reissue)
- Jerry Angel - Drums on tracks 5–8 (original issue)
