= Dawn of the Dickies =

Studio album by the Dickies
- Released: October 1979
- Studios: Cherokee, Los Angeles, CA
- Genre: Punk rock
- Length: 34:19 (reissue)
- Label: A&M
- Producer: Robin Geoffrey Cable

The Dickies chronology
The Incredible Shrinking Dickies (1979)	Dawn of the Dickies (1979)	Stukas Over Disneyland (1983)

Dawn of the Dickies is the second studio album by the California punk band the Dickies. It includes the UK hits "Nights in White Satin" (a high-speed cover of the Moody Blues song), which reached No. 39 in the UK chart in September 1979, and "Fan Mail," which made No. 57 in February 1980.

The album's title and jacket cover, depicting the band members set upon by "zombies" in blue make-up, was a salute to the George A. Romero horror film, Dawn of the Dead.

== Critical reception ==
Professional ratings
Review scores
Source	Rating
AllMusic	4/5 stars
Smash Hits	4/10

Trouser Press wrote: "By slowing down the tempo a half step and coming up with strong melodies, guitarist Stan Lee and crew manage to reel off one maniacally catchy gem after another." The Globe and Mail said that "the Dickies go for the three-chord charge, and to complement the jangly, harsh music they have written eminently disposable lyrics about silly friends and trite situations." In 1995, the Los Angeles Daily News deemed the album "a junk-culture classic."

== Track listing ==
No.	Title	Writer(s)	Length
1.	"Where Did His Eye Go?"	Phillips, Lee	3:41
2.	"Fan Mail"	Phillips, Huffsteter, Kaballero	3:04
3.	"Manny, Moe & Jack"	Lee, Kaballero, Wilde	2:50
4.	"Infidel Zombie"	Phillips, Lee, Ainsworth, Kaballero	3:04
5.	"I'm a Chollo"	Phillips, Lee	3:45
6.	"Nights in White Satin"	Hayward	2:55
7.	"(I'm Stuck in a Pagoda With) Tricia Toyota"	Phillips, Lee, Wagon	2:52
8.	"I've Got a Splitting Hedachi"	Phillips, Lee, Kaballero	2:29
9.	"Attack of the Mole Men"	Phillips, Lee, Ainsworth	3:41
10.	"She Loves Me Not"	Phillips, Lee	1:13

Captain Oi! CD bonus tracks
No.	Title	Writer(s)	Length
11.	"Gigantor"	Raskin, Singer	2:29
12.	"Bowling with Bedrock Barney"	Phillips, Lee	2:09

== Personnel ==
- Leonard Graves Phillips – lead vocals, Mellotron, piano, organ
- Stan Lee – guitars, vocals
- Chuck Wagon – keyboards, guitars, saxophone, harmonica, vocals
- Billy Club – bass, vocals
- Karlos Kaballero – drums, percussion
- Robin Geoffrey Cable – production, engineering
