= Chuck Wagon (musician) =

American musician (1956–1981)

- Born: Robert Davis; August 11, 1956
- Died: June 6, 1981 (aged 24) Los Angeles, California, U.S.
- Genres: Punk rock; pop-punk
- Occupation: Multi-instrumentalist
- Instruments: Keyboards; guitar; saxophone; harmonica; vocals
- Years active: 1978–1981
- Label: A&M

Robert Davis (August 11, 1956 – June 6, 1981), stage name Chuck Wagon, was an American musician and member of the Los Angeles punk rock band the Dickies, with whom he released two albums in his lifetime, as well as a solo 7" single called "Rock n' Roll Won't Go Away".

Having joined the Dickies shortly after their formation in 1977, Wagon was the band's multi-instrumentalist, playing keyboards, rhythm guitar, saxophone and harmonica as well as performing backing vocals. Dissatisfied with the band by early 1981, Wagon quit but was persuaded to return for a handful of live shows. His final studio work with the band, released posthumously in 1983 on Stukas Over Disneyland, would feature Wagon on drums.

On the evening of June 5, 1981 after a Dickies show in Topanga Canyon, California and deeply depressed about the end of his relationship with his girlfriend, Wagon returned home and shot himself in the head with a .22 rifle at his parents' San Fernando Valley home. He died in a hospital the following morning at the age of 24.

== Discography ==
- The Dickies – The Incredible Shrinking Dickies (A&M records)
- The Dickies – Dawn of the Dickies (A&M records)
- The Dickies – Stukas Over Disneyland (Tracks 1–4) (PVC)
- Chuck Wagon – Rock & Roll Won't Go Away (A&M Records)
