= Flywheel Arts Collective =

Coordinates: 42°16′16.6″N 72°40′19.4″W

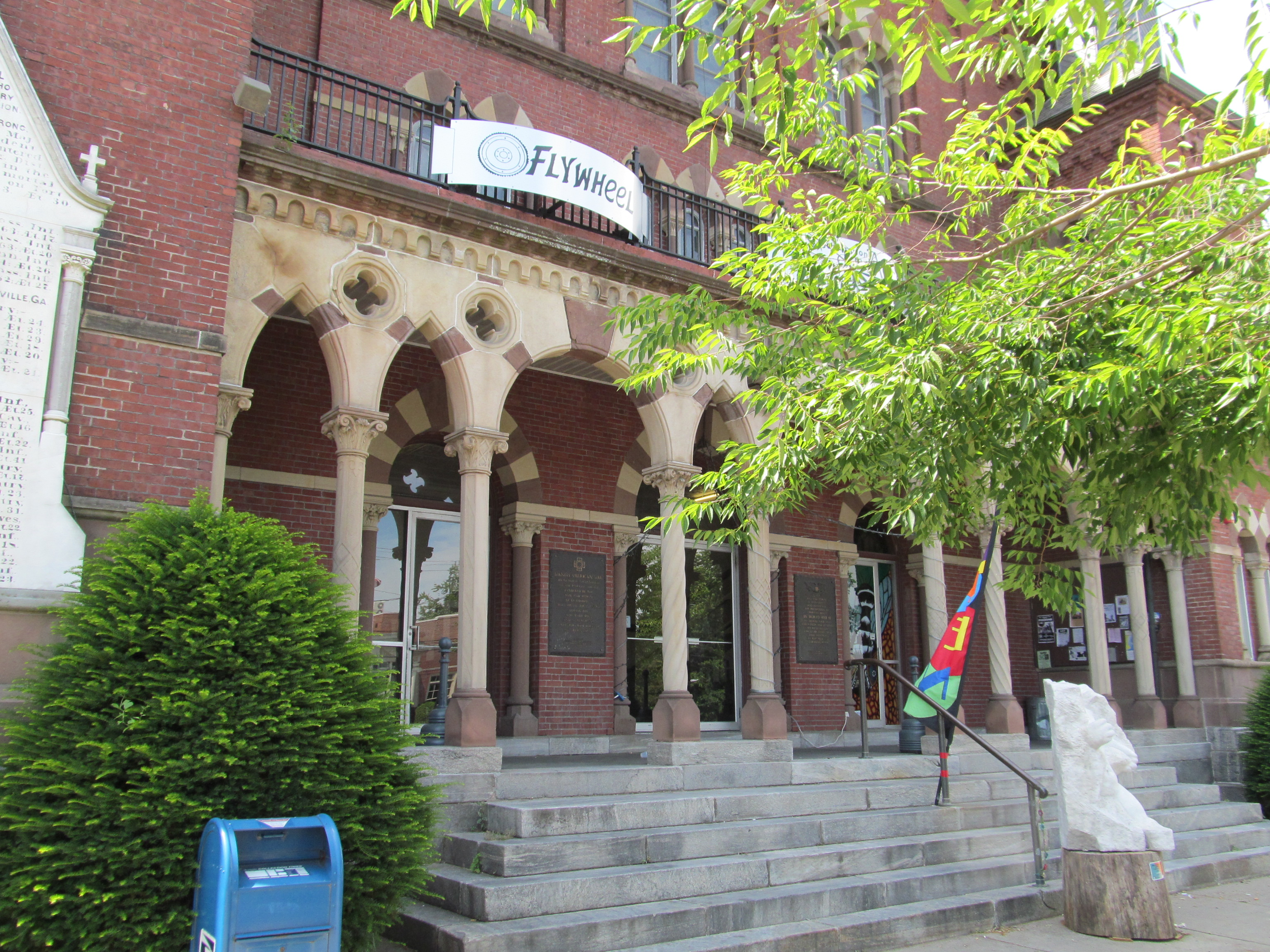
Flywheel Arts Collective

The Flywheel Arts Collective is a collectively run, DIY culture non-profit performance space, in Easthampton, Massachusetts. Flywheel hosts cheap and free shows as well as community events and workshops. Flywheel is governed by consensus and is run by volunteers. Its programming schedule is determined by members of the Flywheel community, which is open for anyone to join, get trained in their operations, or to schedule an event.

In spring of 1998, the Valley Arts and Music Alliance (VAMA) was founded by Cindy Bow and Helen Harrison, a grassroots collective with the aim of producing shows that reflected the artists visions rather than the values of the music industry. Throughout the rest of 1998, the group put together more than two dozen shows before finding a permanent location at 2 Holyoke Street, where it came to be known as Flywheel. The doors for Flywheels first location opened in March 1999.

The mission statement of Flywheel is to build community and provide artists with an environment in which creativity is valued over profit, believing that art and information should be accessible and affordable for everyone.

Most of the bands that play at Flywheel are local artists, though there are occasionally performances by more well-known acts such as Kill Your Idols, Thurston Moore, and Fugazi.

Not only does Flywheel showcase musicians, but they also provide a space for art openings, theater, poetry readings, performance art and film screenings.

Flywheel held its last show at its old location on Holyoke Street in March 2007.

However, April 15, 2010 saw the beginning of a three-day grand re-opening celebration of the Flywheel Arts Collective in its new home in Easthampton's historic Old Town Hall on 43 Main Street.
