= At the Drive-In discography =

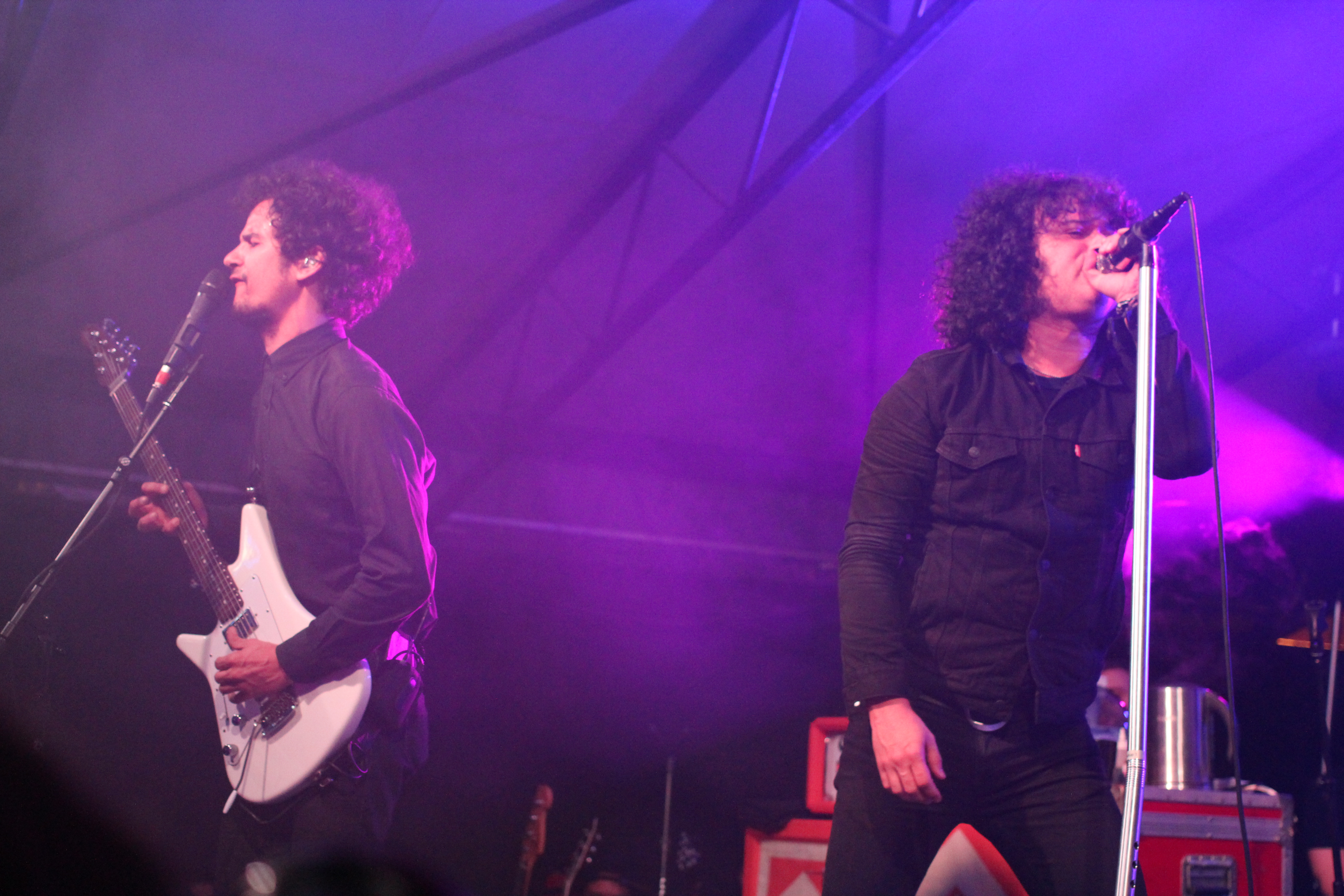
- At the Drive-In in 2017
- Studio albums: 4
- Extended plays: 6
- Compilation albums: 1
- Singles: 6
- Music videos: 6

The discography of At the Drive-In, an El Paso, Texas-based post-hardcore band active from 1994 to 2018, consists of four studio albums, one compilation album, five EPs, six singles, and three music videos.

At the Drive-In formed in 1994 with an initial lineup of Cedric Bixler-Zavala (lead vocals), Jim Ward (guitar and backing vocals), Jarrett Wrenn (guitar), Kenny Hopper (bass guitar), and Bernie Rincon (drums). This lineup released the band's debut EP, Hell Paso, through their own imprint Western Breed Records that November. Rincon was replaced by Davy Simmons for their second EP, 1995's ¡Alfaro Vive, Carajo! Further lineup changes saw Wrenn replaced by Adam Amparan, Hopper by Omar Rodríguez-López, and Simmons by Ryan Sawyer. The band's debut album, Acrobatic Tenement, was released in February 1997 through Flipside Records. The band's lineup fluctuated again, with Amparan's departure prompting Rodríguez-López to move to guitar while Paul Hinojos filled the bass position, and Tony Hajjar replaced Sawyer on drums. Ben Rodriguez played guitar on 1997's El Gran Orgo EP due to Ward's inability to participate; however, Ward was back in place for a split single with The Aasee Lake and the band's second album, In/Casino/Out, released in August 1998 by Fearless Records. The lineup of Bixler-Zavala, Ward, Rodríguez-López, Hinojos, and Hajjar would remain intact until the band's dissolution.

1999 saw the release of the Vaya EP, which spawned the band's first music video, for the song "Metronome Arthritis". A trio of split releases followed in 2000, including an EP with Sunshine and singles with Burning Airlines and the Murder City Devils. Their third studio album, Relationship of Command, was released in September 2000 through Grand Royal Records. It proved to be a breakthrough, reaching #116 on the Billboard 200 and #33 on the UK Albums Chart. All three of its singles, "One Armed Scissor", "Rolodex Propaganda", and "Invalid Litter Dept.", reached the UK Singles Chart, with "One Armed Scissor" also reaching #26 on Billboard's Modern Rock Tracks chart. In 2001 the band went on indefinite hiatus, with Bixler-Zavala and Rodríguez-López forming The Mars Volta while Ward, Hinojos, and Hajjar formed Sparta. In November 2004 Fearless Records re-released all three of the band's studio albums as well as the Vaya EP, followed by the compilation album This Station Is Non-Operational in 2005 which reached #95 on the Billboard 200 and #3 amongst independently released albums.

== Studio albums ==
List of studio albums, with selected chart positions and certifications
Title	Album details	Peak chart positions										Certifications
Title	Album details	US	AUS	AUT	BEL	FRA	GER	ITA	SCO	SWI	UK	Certifications
Acrobatic Tenement	Released: February 18, 1997; Label: Flipside; Format: LP, CD	—	—	—	—	—	—	—	—	—	—	
In/Casino/Out	Released: August 18, 1998; Label: Fearless; Format: LP, CD	—	—	—	—	—	—	—	—	—	—	
Relationship of Command	Released: September 12, 2000; Label: Grand Royal; Format: LP, CD	116	25	—	—	—	—	—	33	—	33	ARIA: Gold; BPI: Gold
in•ter a•li•a	Released: May 5, 2017; Label: Rise; Format: LP, CD, digital	39	15	31	64	166	30	82	20	57	30	
"—" denotes a recording that did not chart or was not released in that territory.

== Compilation albums ==
List of compilation albums, with selected chart positions
Title	Album details	Peak chart positions				
Title	Album details	US	US Indie	AUS	IRL	UK
This Station Is Non-Operational	Released: May 24, 2005; Label: Fearless; Format: CD / DVD	95	3	34	71	118

== Extended plays ==
Title	EP details
Hell Paso	Released: November 1994; Label: Western Breed; Format: EP
¡Alfaro Vive, Carajo!	Released: June 1995; Label: Western Breed; Format: EP
El Gran Orgo	Released: September 18, 1997; Label: Offtime; Format: EP
Vaya	Released: July 27, 1999; Label: Fearless; Format: CD
Sunshine / At the Drive-In	Released: April 13, 2000; Label: Big Wheel Recreation; Format: CD
Diamanté	Released: November 24, 2017 January 26, 2018 (digital); Label: Rise; Format: Vinyl

== Singles ==
List of singles, with selected chart positions, showing year released and album name
Title	Year	Peak chart positions							Album
Title	Year	US Alt	AUS	AUS Alt.	CAN	SCO	UK	UK Indie	Album
"One Armed Scissor"	2000	26	85	15	145	77	64	10	Relationship of Command
"Rolodex Propaganda"	2000	—	—	—	—	55	54	—	Relationship of Command
"Invalid Litter Dept."	2001	—	—	—	—	47	50	—	Relationship of Command
"Governed by Contagions"	2016	—	—	—	—	—	—	—	in•ter a•li•a
"Incurably Innocent"	2017	—	—	—	—	—	—	—	in•ter a•li•a
"Hostage Stamps"	2017	—	—	—	—	—	—	—	in•ter a•li•a
"Pendulum in a Peasant Dress"	2017	—	—	—	—	—	—	—	in•ter a•li•a
"—" denotes releases that did not chart.

== Split singles ==
Title	Split details
At The Drive-In / The Aasee Lake	Released: September 1999; Label: Nerd Rock Records; Format: 7" vinyl
ATDI / Burning Airlines	Released: 2000; Label: Thick Records; Format: 7" vinyl
ATDI / Murder City Devils	Released: 2000; Label: Buddyhead; Format: 7" vinyl

== Compilation appearances ==
Year	Release details	Track
1998	Some Three-Word-Bands From Western Breed: Released: 1998; Label: Western Breed; Format: CD	"Terranova Compost"
1998	The Eagle Has Landed: Released: 1998; Label: Tranquility Base; Format: LP	"Salient"

== Music videos ==
Year	Song	Director	Album
1999	"Metronome Arthritis"	Dan Tierney, At the Drive-In	Vaya
2000	"One Armed Scissor"	At the Drive-In	Relationship of Command
2000	"Invalid Litter Dept."	Tony Hajjar, Paul Hinojos	Relationship of Command
2016	"Governed by Contagions"	Damon Locks, Rob Shaw	in•ter a•li•a
2017	"Incurably Innocent"	Damon Locks, Rob Shaw	in•ter a•li•a
2017	"Hostage Stamps"	Damon Locks, Rob Shaw	in•ter a•li•a
2017	"Call Broken Arrow"	Damon Locks, Rob Shaw	in•ter a•li•a
