= One Armed Scissor =

2000 single by At the Drive-In

Single by At the Drive-In

from the album Relationship of Command
- B-side: "Pattern Against User"; "Incetardis"
- Released: 2000
- Genre: Post-hardcore, emo, alternative rock
- Length: 4:20 (album version); 3:45 (single edit)
- Label: Grand Royal
- Songwriters: Cedric Bixler-Zavala; Jim Ward; Omar Rodríguez-López; Paul Hinojos; Tony Hajjar
- Producer: Ross Robinson

At the Drive-In singles chronology
| "One Armed Scissor" (2000) | "Rolodex Propaganda" (2000) |

"One Armed Scissor" is the debut single by the American post-hardcore band At the Drive-In, released in 2000 from their album Relationship of Command. It was the first At the Drive-In song to be played regularly on a number of radio stations, and is considered to be one of the first emo songs to have achieved mainstream success. The song reached No. 26 on the Billboard Alternative Songs chart and No. 64 on the UK Singles Chart, becoming one of their highest charting singles. It was also the encore song of their 2016 reunion tour.

== Background ==
According to the band in a 2001 Channel V interview, the "one-armed scissor" is a Vodka Red Bull which serves as an omniscient narrator relating the band's experiences on tour.

This song, along with the B-side "Incetardis", was selected for the 2005 compilation This Station Is Non-Operational, which itself was named after one of "One Armed Scissor's" lyrics.

The music video for this song contains footage from the band's tours. A second version of the video was released with This Station Is Non-Operational that contained more live footage, as well as studio footage.

== Track listing ==
CD

1. "One Armed Scissor" – 3:45
2. "Pattern Against User" – 3:18
3. "Incetardis" – 3:26
4. "One Armed Scissor" (videoclip, only Europe and Australian editions)

Promotional CD

1. "One Armed Scissor" – 3:45
2. "Call Out Hook" – 0:13 (only Grand Royal edition)

7" vinyl (Jukebox version)

- Side A: "One Armed Scissor" – 3:45
- Side B: "Pattern Against User" – 3:18
- Side B: "Incetardis" – 3:26 (only Restart Records edition)

VHS (US edition)

1. One Armed Scissor (videoclip) – 3:45

VHS (UK edition, 2001)

1. One Armed Scissor: Letterman Performance – 5:38

== Legacy ==
- The song was listed at No. 255 on Pitchfork's "Top 500 Songs of the 2000s". A BBC Music review hailed "One Armed Scissor" as one of the "most invigorating rock songs released in the last 20 or 30 years, let alone the past 10." In October 2011, NME placed it at number 113 on its list "150 Best Tracks of the Past 15 Years".
- "One Armed Scissor" is featured in the music video games Guitar Hero World Tour and Rock Band 3 as a playable track.
- Alternative Press listed "One Armed Scissor" as the decade's "contemporary punk/emo scene's best single" out of one hundred others.

== Charts ==
| Chart (2000–01) | Peak position |
|---|---|
| Australia (ARIA Charts) | 85 |
| UK Singles (Official Charts) | 64 |
| US Alternative Airplay (Billboard) | 26 |
