= This Station Is Non-Operational =

Compilation album by At the Drive-In
- Released: May 24, 2005
- Recorded: 1997–2001
- Genres: Post-hardcore; punk rock
- Length: 72:09
- Label: Fearless
- Producers: Ross Robinson, Mike Major, Simon Askew

At the Drive-In chronology
Relationship of Command (2000)	This Station Is Non-Operational (2005)	in•ter a•li•a (2017)

This Station Is Non-Operational is a compilation album by El Paso, Texas-based post-hardcore band At the Drive-In, released May 24, 2005 by Fearless Records, four years after the band went on indefinite hiatus. Its tracks span the band's career from 1997 to 2000, with selections from El Gran Orgo (1997), In/Casino/Out (1998), Vaya (1999), and Relationship of Command (2000), as well as several rare tracks taken from singles and a previously unreleased cover version of The Smiths' "This Night Has Opened My Eyes". The album also includes a DVD with the music videos for "Metronome Arthritis", "One Armed Scissor", and "Invalid Litter Dept.", an electronic press kit, a discography, and multimedia content. It became the band's highest-charting release in the United States. Its title comes from a lyric in the song "One Armed Scissor".

== Background ==
The compilation does not contain any material from the band's releases prior to 1997, omitting the EPs Hell Paso (1994) and ¡Alfaro Vive, Carajo! (1995) as well as their 1996 debut album Acrobatic Tenement. Guitarist Jim Ward addressed these omissions in a 2006 interview:

I was just adamant about certain things staying off it. There was just some stuff I wanted to stay special, like those early seven-inches. If you have them, then you have them because you were in a certain place at a certain time. I wanted to keep it special for those people if it makes sense. It's not that they're embarrassing to me, it's because I wanted them to remain intimate with those people who were there when we slept on their floors. We were putting out 500 seven-inches even though people sell them on eBay for more than I had to put them out with. I still prefer it that way. I like that culture; I'm part of that culture. I didn't want everything homogenized into one album. I'm not a big [fan] of "greatest hits" or whatever, but I understand that's part of what labels do. I wasn't really a big part of it to be honest with you.

== Reception ==
Professional ratings
Review scores
Source	Rating
Allmusic	4.5/5 stars
Drowned in Sound	10/10
Pitchfork	8.3/10
Rolling Stone	3/5 stars

This Station Is Non-Operational became At the Drive-In's highest-charting release in the United States, reaching #95 on the Billboard 200 and #3 on the Top Independent Albums chart. Critical reaction to the compilation was very positive. Johnny Loftus of Allmusic stated that it "really makes you miss the focused intensity of the band's salad days", and that because of the stylistic improvisations of the band members' post-At the Drive-In projects The Mars Volta and Sparta "it's easy to forget about At the Drive-In's capacity for convention. Their spectacular live show was a big part of their success. But as This Station Is Non-Operational continually points out, At the Drive-In wrote incredible songs, too." Mike Diver of Drowned in Sound gave the album a perfect score of 10 out of 10, remarking that it "must be listened to with an absolutely open mind. Yes, those earliest efforts from El Gran Orgo are scratchy, gutterside punk at best and, well, utterly underwhelming in absolute fairness. But that's not what ATD-I will be remembered for - it's the tracks from In/Casino/Out and the straw that ultimately broke their collective back, Relationship of Command, that today's fashioncore 'punks' have plumbed almost endlessly for inspiration. And you know what? They still sound amazingly fresh and vital." He noted that the rare tracks make the release attractive to existing fans, but "To the newcomer, though, this record just about transcends essential; really, if you like contemporary punk rock, even the MTV-sanitised version, then you've no excuse whatsoever for not owning this."

Jason Crock of Pitchfork noted that the release "aims to be a retrospective in the true sense of the word", ignoring some of the band's strongest songs and singles such as "Invalid Litter Dept." in favor of offering "a snapshot of the band's artistic growth, from class-act emo to muscular modern rock." He criticized the B-side tracks as "unrewarding" and "mildly compelling curios", but accepted them as "simply footnotes to the story told by the first 11 tracks" Remarking on the press' interpretation of the band members' post-At the Drive-In projects Sparta as "accessible" and The Mars Volta as "difficult", he noted that "the push/pull between the two extremes within the songs on This Station Is Non-Operational is seamless." Christian Hoard of Rolling Stone was more critical of the compilation, stating that "Where ATDI's later albums were art-punk cherry bombs packed with cascading shouts and tricky rhythms, most of these singles, rarities, B sides and live cuts sound unfocused -- long on arty twists and youthful bloodletting but short on explosiveness."

== Track listing ==
All tracks are written by Cedric Bixler-Zavala, Jim Ward, Omar Rodríguez-López, Paul Hinojos, and Tony Hajjar, except where noted.

No.	Title	Writer(s)	Producer	Length
1.	"Fahrenheit" (from El Gran Orgo EP, 1997)	Bixler-Zavala, Rodríguez-López, Hinojos, Hajjar		2:27
2.	"Picket Fence Cartel" (from El Gran Orgo EP, 1997)	Bixler-Zavala, Rodríguez-López, Hinojos, Hajjar		2:29
3.	"Chanbara" (from In/Casino/Out, 1998)			2:57
4.	"Lopsided" (from In/Casino/Out, 1998)			4:41
5.	"Napoleon Solo" (from In/Casino/Out, 1998)			4:44
6.	"Pickpocket" (from In/Casino/Out, 1998)			2:35
7.	"Metronome Arthritis" (from Vaya EP, 1999)			3:58
8.	"198d" (from Vaya EP, 1999)			4:03
9.	"One Armed Scissor" (from Relationship of Command, 2000)		Ross Robinson	3:44
10.	"Enfilade" (from Relationship of Command, 2000)		Robinson	5:03
11.	"Non-Zero Possibility" (from Relationship of Command, 2000)		Robinson	5:33
12.	"Incetardis" (from "One Armed Scissor" single, 2000)		Robinson	3:26
13.	"Doorman's Placebo" (from At the Drive-In / The Aasee Lake split single, 1998)			5:32
14.	"Autorelocator" (from Sunshine / At the Drive-In split single, 2000)		Mike Major, At the Drive-In	4:59
15.	"Rascuache" (Latch Bros. remix; from At the Drive-In / Murder City Devils split single, 2000)			3:24
16.	"This Night Has Opened My Eyes" (originally performed by The Smiths, recorded July 1998)	Morrissey, Johnny Marr		3:58
17.	"Initiation" (BBC session; from "Invalid Litter Dept." single, 2001)	Bixler-Zavala, Ward, Adam Amparan, Rodríguez-López, Ryan Sawyer	Simon Askew	3:33
18.	"Take Up Thy Stethoscope and Walk" (BBC session, originally performed by Pink Floyd; from "Invalid Litter Dept." single, 2001)	Roger Waters	Askew	5:03
Total length:				72:09

== Personnel ==
Band

- Cedric Bixler – lead vocals
- Jim Ward – guitar, keyboards, backing vocals
- Omar Rodríguez – guitar, backing vocals
- Paul Hinojos – bass guitar
- Tony Hajjar – drums, percussion

Additional musicians

- Ben Rodriguez – guitar on "Fahrenheit" and "Picket Fence Cartel"
- Marcelo Rodche – percussion on "Chanbara"
- Iggy Pop – intro vocals on "Enfilade"

Production

- Mike Major – recording and mixing engineer of tracks 1, 2, 7, 8, and 15, producer and engineer of track 14, mixing engineer of track 16
- Alex Newport – recording and mixing engineer of tracks 3–6 and 13
- Ross Robinson – producer of tracks 9–12
- Andy Wallace – mixing engineer of tracks 9–12
- Chuck Johnson – engineer of tracks 9–12
- Kevin Bosley and Zak Girdis – assistant engineers of tracks 9–12
- Justin Leah and Bobby Torres – engineers of track 16
- Steve Lamacq – recording engineer of tracks 17 and 18
- Simon Askew – producer of tracks 17 and 18
- Paul Noble – assistant producer of tracks 17 and 18
- Brad Vance – mastering

Artwork

- Jason Farrell – design
- Paul Drake, Daniëlle van Ark, Pat Graham, Alberto Polo, Jeff Gros, Justin Borucki, and Paul Delia – photography

== Charts ==
Year	Country	Position
2005	Billboard 200 (U.S.)	95
2005	Australian Albums Chart	34
