= Acrobatic Tenement =

Studio album by At the Drive-In
- Released: February 18, 1997
- Recorded: July 1996
- Studio: Commercial Soundworks (Hollywood)
- Genres: Post-hardcore; emo; punk rock
- Length: 32:20
- Label: Flipside
- Producers: Blaze James, Doug Green

At the Drive-In chronology
¡Alfaro Vive, Carajo! (1995)	Acrobatic Tenement (1997)	El Gran Orgo (1997)

Professional ratings
Review scores
Source	Rating
AllMusic	4/5 stars
Consequence of Sound	C+
Drowned in Sound	10/10
Pitchfork	6.5/10

Acrobatic Tenement is the debut studio album by the American post-hardcore band At the Drive-In, released on February 18, 1997, on Flipside. The album was reissued by Fearless Records in 2004, along with the band's subsequent albums In/Casino/Out and Relationship of Command, and was re-released again in 2013.

Only one track from Acrobatic Tenement appeared on the band's 2005 retrospective compilation album This Station Is Non-Operational, with "Initiation" appearing as a live BBC recording.

== Background and recording ==
Then bass player Omar Rodríguez-Lopez has noted that the recording of Acrobatic Tenement was the band's first time recording at a twenty-four track studio, that they only had a total of three days in the studio, and the band engaged in alcohol and cannabis use, all of which he argues had a detrimental effect on the album. The album has been noted for its lack of guitar distortion, due to guitarist Jim Ward believing that his distortion-free recorded parts would not be used for the final master. Acrobatic Tenement was recorded at Commercial Soundworks in Hollywood for only $600 (equivalent to $1,232 in 2025) after the band concluded a tour of the United States.

Acrobatic Tenement was initially released on August 18, 1996, exclusively on compact disc through the Los Angeles–based independent record label/fanzine Flipside, after some of its editors saw the band perform in Los Angeles.

Reflecting upon the aftermath of recording Acrobatic Tenement, frontman Cedric Bixler recalled in 2013: "Before [the album's release], the band had broken up. We did a U.S. tour and we decided to split up. I always needed Jim to be there, but he'd had a falling out with Omar. We'd made a bunch of dumb moves at the time—kicked the drummer [Ryan Sawyer] who was on the record out, and then the other guitar player [Adam Amparan]—but then Tony [Hajjar] and Paul [Hinojos] came and played. Omar switched to guitar at the time, because he played bass on that album, so when we played live, it was a lot different."

Much of the album, particularly the track "Embroglio," was inspired by the life and suicide of Julio Venegas, a friend of the band. Venegas' death later inspired the concept album storyline of De-Loused in the Comatorium, the debut album by Bixler and Rodríguez' subsequent project the Mars Volta.

== Track listing ==
No.	Title	Length
1.	"Star Slight"	1:18
2.	"Schaffino"	2:49
3.	"Ebroglio"	2:47
4.	"Initiation"	3:26
5.	"Communication Drive-In"	1:44
6.	"Skips on the Record"	3:07
7.	"Paid Vacation Time"	3:33
8.	"Ticklish"	4:35
9.	"Blue Tag"	3:17
10.	"Coating of Arms"	2:46
11.	"Porfirio Diaz"	2:58
Total length:		32:20

== Personnel ==
- Cedric Bixler-Zavala – lead vocals
- Jim Ward – guitar, backing vocals
- Adam Amparan – guitar
- Omar Rodríguez-López – bass guitar
- Ryan Sawyer – drums
