= Sunshine / At the Drive-In =

EP by Sunshine and At the Drive-In
- Released: April 13, 2000
- Recorded: September 1999 / 2000
- Genre: Post-hardcore
- Length: 25:38
- Label: Big Wheel Recreation
- Producer: At the Drive-In

Sunshine and At the Drive-In chronology
Vaya (1999)	Sunshine / At the Drive-In (2000)	Relationship of Command (2000)

Sunshine / At the Drive-In is a split EP by post-hardcore bands Sunshine and At the Drive-In. It was released under the independent record label Big Wheel Recreation on April 13, 2000. It featured songs by the Czech band Sunshine and the American band At the Drive-In. It was also released on vinyl on 12-inch.

== Description ==
The album itself does not include a cover, but only the disc and the case. Anchored by the much more prominent At the Drive-In, the split is actually dominated in length songs by Sunshine; their three tracks elapse almost two-thirds of the album. The first song "Streamlined", which has been described as having a steady drum beat, odd noises and echoing guitar effects, appears three times on the album; the second two being remixes of the same general loop. For fans of At the Drive-In, this album, as well as another split they shared with Burning Airlines, gave a taste of their music from their anticipated upcoming album, Relationship of Command. At the Drive-In's two-song contribution bears a strong musical resemblance to their previous release, 1999's Vaya, as well as their subsequent full-length album, Relationship of Command. However, the split has a considerably lower level of production than Vaya, and lacks the full sound found on Relationship of Command, attributed to not having Ross Robinson producing it. "Extracurricular" later appeared as one of two bonus tracks on the re-release of Relationship of Command.

== Reception ==
Professional ratings
Review scores
Source	Rating
Rolling Stone	3.5/5 stars

Generally, reception for the album was positive, and Matthieu Moquet of Mowno Magazine has called it "dark and phenomenal". Also, the two bands have been said to complement each other well on this EP. However, the third repetition of the song "Streamlined" left one critic tired of the EP, and Sunshine / At the Drive-In has been described as decent, but not essential.

Sunshine / At the Drive-In spent a total of three weeks on CMJ Radio charts, appearing first in the charts at #134 during the week of May 12, 2000. By May 29, the EP had managed to reach its peak ranking at 60.

== Track listing ==
Sunshine
No.	Title	Length
1.	"Streamlined"	4:59
2.	"Streamlined" (Dead Elektro Mix; remixed by Bit BobTM)	5:34
3.	"Streamlined" (Line Mix; remixed by the T-Boom)	6:05

At the Drive-In
No.	Title	Length
4.	"Extracurricular"	4:00
5.	"Autorelocator"	5:00
Total length:		25:38

== Personnel ==
Sunshine

- Dan Bláha – drums
- Karel Buriánek – guitar, vocals
- Martin "Mátry" Procházka – bass

At the Drive-In

- Cedric Bixler – lead vocals
- Tony Hajjar – drums
- Paul Hinojos – bass
- Omar Rodríguez – guitar
- Jim Ward – guitar, backing vocals, keyboards

Production Staff

- Mike Major – engineer, mixer
- Bryan Sheffield – photography

== Charts ==
=== Album ===
CMJ (2000)	Peak position
Top 75 Radio Airplay	60

== Sources ==
- Brackett, Nathan; Hoard, Christian (2004). The new Rolling Stone album guide. Simon and Schuster. pp. 930. ISBN 0-7432-0169-8.
- "CMJ Radio 200". CMJ New Music Report. 62 (666). CMJ Network, Inc: 56. May 15, 2000. ISSN 0890-0795.
- "Top 75 - CMJ Radio Airplay". CMJ New Music Monthly. 84. CMJ Network, Inc: 110. August 2000. ISSN 1074-6978.
- Nakamura, Eric (1999). "Giant robot". Vol. 16–23. L(os) A(ngeles), CA. ISSN 1534-9845. OCLC 36243340.
- Sharpe-Young, Garry (2005). New Wave of American Heavy Metal. Zonda Books Limited. p. 376. ISBN 0-9582684-0-1. OCLC 71843078.
