= Mantra Hiroshima =

Studio album by Omar Rodríguez-López
- Released: November 29, 2010
- Genres: Experimental rock, jazz fusion
- Length: 41:10
- Label: Rodriguez Lopez Productions
- Producer: Omar Rodríguez-López

Omar Rodríguez-López solo chronology
Cizaña de los Amores (2010)	Mantra Hiroshima (2010)	Dōitashimashite (2010)

Omar Rodríguez-López chronology
Octahedron (2009)	Mantra Hiroshima (2010)	Sin Sin Sin (2011)

Mantra Hiroshima is the eighteenth studio album by Omar Rodríguez-López as a solo artist, released on November 29, 2010. It is his second record to feature Zach Hill on drums, the first of which was by El Grupo Nuevo de Omar Rodriguez Lopez, titled Cryptomnesia. The album, along with the aforementioned Cryptomnesia, are well-regarded in Rodríguez-López's discography. Both works have been classified as two of the most "manic and challenging projects" Rodríguez-López has undertaken.

== Overview ==
The album has been described as progressive as well as heavily psychedelic. Short segues are included which provide transitions to longer movements. "El Oyente" features keys, jazz elements, and repetitive guitar tones that increase in intensity. "Sobre la Resurrección," the final and longest track of the album, is effects-laden with jarring instrumentation. The track "Los Tres 'Yo's'" is included on the vinyl edition of Rodríguez-López's compilation record, Telesterion, though Mantra Hiroshima itself was the first of his records not to be released in vinyl format. However, it was eventually released on vinyl on January 19, 2024. The first four-hundred orders of the original launch came with a limited edition poster of the album cover art by Sonny Kay. Regarding Mantra Hiroshima, its rerelease by Clouds Hill states: "An album as a reminder that out of pain grows something wonderful. And the most awful tragedies are avoidable."

== Track listing ==
No.	Title	Length
1.	"Acerca de la Vida"	0:20
2.	"On the First Look"	2:02
3.	"El Oyente"	6:24
4.	"Mastering Death"	1:27
5.	"Los Tres "Yo's""	3:03
6.	"Reason and Understanding"	1:09
7.	"El Hacer"	6:58
8.	"Hope"	5:08
9.	"Sobre la Resurrección"	14:34
Total length:		41:05

== Personnel ==
- Omar Rodríguez-López – guitar, synths, keyboards
- Juan Alderete de la Peña – bass
- Zach Hill – drums

=== Technical ===
- Omar Rodríguez-López – producer
- Lars Stalfors – engineering, mixing
- Pete Lyman – mastering

=== Artwork ===
- Sonny Kay – artwork, layout

== Release history ==
Region	Date	Label	Format
Worldwide	November 29, 2010	Rodriguez Lopez Productions	Digital download
Worldwide	March 13, 2011	Rodriguez Lopez Productions	CD
Worldwide	January 19, 2024	Clouds Hill	Vinyl
