= The Fall on Deaf Ears =

American rock music group (1996)

- Origin: El Paso, Texas, United States
- Genres: Post-hardcore, punk
- Years active: 1996
- Label: Western Breed
- Past members: Cedric Bixler-Zavala; Sarah Reiser; Clint Newsom; Laura Beard

The Fall on Deaf Ears was a musical group from El Paso, Texas that featured guitarist Sarah Reiser, bassist Laura Beard, Cedric Bixler-Zavala of At the Drive-In and The Mars Volta, who played drums, and Clint Newsom of Rhythm of Black Lines and The Hades Kick also on guitar. The band arose from the mid-90s El Paso punk scene.

== Overview ==
The Fall on Deaf Ears played in the post-hardcore style typical of bands such as The Nation of Ulysses and Circus Lupus. They played live shows with a number of groups including Propagandhi, Egon, and Select Your Fighter. Beard and Reiser had previously formed the bands Rope and Glitter Girls and had faced criticism for being women in the punk scene. The Fall on Deaf Ears only recorded a handful of songs before they broke up. Beard and Reiser were killed shortly thereafter in a car wreck in 1997. They were both 17 years old. Characterized by the unique vocals of all four members, the band has been described as a "precious document" of the mid-90s El Paso punk era and Texas punk history as a whole.

Bixler-Zavala moved on to At the Drive-In before the dissolution of The Fall on Deaf Ears, which Beard and Reiser sang backup vocals in its early incarnation. He would later write the song "Napoleon Solo" as singer/lyricist with At The Drive-in about the tragedy. The incident has deeply affected the frontman, as evidenced by an interview with Rolling Stone: "I think about them every night. It just sticks with us now. We always play that song about them – ‘Napoleon Solo’ – at the end of our sets. Everything we do is in honor of them." The deaths of Reiser and Beard affected not only Bixler-Zavala but many others in the El Paso scene. Tributes were made from local bands like Egon and Ex-Impetus’ split seven-inch, We Love You, We Miss You. The Musica Sin Fronteras Exhibit in the El Paso Museum of History paid homage to The Fall on Deaf Ears and the two women by dedicating a special section to the group.

The band's recorded material was released in 1997 and titled In Memory 1979–1997, which was a 7-inch single. It also included songs by Rope and was released by Western Breed Records. A self-titled five-song EP was released in 2002 by Post-Parlo Records on CD. In the 5 recorded tracks, samples of Miles Davis' "Bitches Brew" can be heard.

== Members ==
- Sarah Reiser - Vocals, Guitar
- Laura Beard - Vocals, Bass
- Cedric Bixler-Zavala - Drums, Vocals
- Clint Newsom - Guitar, Vocals, Recording

== Discography ==
- In Memory 1979–1997 – (1997)
  - 1. Never Need - 3:34
  - 2. So You Speak Brail? - 2:25
- The Fall on Deaf Ears – (2002)
  - 1. Your Reflection - 3:38
  - 2. Screws and Bolts - 4:30
  - 3. Do You Speak Braille? - 2:25
  - 4. Calls of Defilement - 4:43
  - 5. Talking Radio Talking Star - 3:54
