= In·ter a·li·a =

in·ter a·li·a

Studio album by At the Drive-In
- Released: May 5, 2017
- Recorded: 2016
- Studios: Sound Factory, Hollywood, California
- Genre: Post-hardcore
- Length: 41:01
- Labels: Rise; Transgressive
- Producers: Omar Rodríguez-López; Rich Costey

At the Drive-In chronology
This Station Is Non-Operational (2005)	in·ter a·li·a (2017)	Diamanté (2017)

Singles from in·ter a·li·a
- 1. "Governed by Contagions" Released: December 8, 2016; 2. "Incurably Innocent" Released: February 22, 2017; 3. "Hostage Stamps" Released: April 2, 2017

Professional ratings
Aggregate scores
Source	Rating
Metacritic	70/100
Review scores
Source	Rating
AllMusic	3/5 stars
The A.V. Club	D
Consequence of Sound	B
Pitchfork	5.8/10
The Skinny	2/5 stars

in·ter a·li·a is the fourth and final studio album by At the Drive-In, released on May 5, 2017 on Rise and Transgressive. Produced by guitarist Omar Rodríguez-López and Rich Costey, it was the band's first studio album in seventeen years, following the release of Relationship of Command (2000) and their initial break-up in 2001.

Recorded at Sound Factory, Hollywood during the band's 2016 reunion, in·ter a·li·a is the band's only studio album to feature guitarist Keeley Davis, who replaced founding member Jim Ward during its 2016–2018 reunion. As a result, the album is the band's first release since El Gran Orgo (1997) not to feature Ward, who declined to participate in the band's second reunion.

Preceded by the singles, "Governed by Contagions", "Incurably Innocent" and "Hostage Stamps", the album debuted at number thirty-nine on the Billboard Albums Chart and number thirty on the UK Albums Chart. The album's title is a variation on the Latin phrase "inter alia" which means "among other things". The cover artwork, including the lyric music videos for the singles "Governed by Contagions" and "Incurably Innocent", were illustrated by Damon Locks, who had previously created the artwork for Relationship of Command.

== Background ==
In 2012, after an eleven-year break, the five core members of At the Drive-In – Cedric Bixler-Zavala, Omar Rodríguez-López, Jim Ward, Paul Hinojos and Tony Hajjar – reunited for a short-lived reunion tour before parting ways again after its completion. Drummer Tony Hajjar noted: "In general, the shows that we did in 2012... it wasn’t a decision to not carry on, that this isn’t right. It was really a plan of doing ten shows. That was literally the plan. We enjoy jamming together, so let’s do ten shows. Let’s not put a tonne of pressure on ourselves, and make sure we have a good time. And we did." Bixler-Zavala elaborated: "It was interesting. It was tense. Things hadn’t really mended yet. But it helped the process of healing."

Two years later, the band reunited in secret with no intentions to record or tour: "In 2014 we got back together and got into a studio and didn’t really care if were writing or not. It was all about talking and venting and feeling each other out again. [...] That was all done in a positive way. But then life took us all in different directions again! For some reason it didn’t happen." The band later reconvened the following year to discuss fully committing to new music and touring: "In October 2015 we sat down in a hotel in El Paso and said: ‘Here’s a line in the sand. Whoever crosses it is committed to touring in 2016, writing a record while we’re on tour, and recording at the end of ’16. And then doing a massive campaign throughout ’17 and ’18’. And, that was it. We went for these strange baby steps, but we felt we had to. It felt right."

After initially committing to the band's reunion, founding guitarist and occasional lead vocalist Jim Ward unexpectedly backed out of their planned 2016 tour in the days prior to it beginning. He was replaced by his Sparta bandmate Keeley Davis, who joined the band as a full contributing member. Reflecting on Ward's departure, Bixler-Zavala stated: "It’s really hard to get five different people and their wants, needs, concerns and doubts. It’s really hard to organize it. [Jim's] head wasn't there. His head wasn't trustworthy. Because of the way Omar and I exploded [with the Mars Volta], I completely understood that. You know, you either let it go and keep going forward, or the train goes on without you. We have to honor what is happening now, which is age and the want to do it. I love him. He's a beautiful human being. A beautiful artist. I just wish he would remember that he's an amazing guitar player. I don't know if he does." A decade on from his departure, Ward later stated: "Even if all five of us talked about it, I’m not sure we’d understand what happened. What I do know is that I wasn’t in a good place mentally, but that doesn’t mean I couldn’t have done my job. But I think getting kicked out, as painful as it was, was probably a blessing in disguise."

== Recording ==
in·ter a·li·a was recorded during the second half of 2016 following a proper reunion tour beginning in March of that year. Drummer Tony Hajjar said of recording the album: "It was the most fun I’ve had in years. It was so great to be around people I care for and care for me. We had some awesome, tough moments. But at the end, they were still great. When it was done we went into the studio control room, the last day of recording, we all just hugged each other. I’m so proud of my brothers, proud that we’ve done this, proud that we still get to do this at any level."

== Writing and composition ==
Describing the record's second single, "Incurably Innocent", singer Cedric Bixler-Zavala stated that it is "a song about sexual assault and being able to finally speak out." In 2017, he alleged that the song covered Danny Masterson's assault of Bixler-Zavala's wife.

== Release ==
The record was unveiled on Wednesday, February 22 following a few short clips being shared by the band's various social media pages the previous week leading up to the announcement. Pre-orders were immediately available for the digital album, CD, cassette, and three different vinyl editions of the record, two of which are exclusive to various bundles offered through the webstore. The digital downloads for the album's singles were offered in wave format upon pre-ordering.

On August 14, the band released a music video for "Call Broken Arrow"

12 bundles were available offering slightly different configurations of items. The "MEGA" bundle was priced at $290 and included a 30.75" skateboard deck limited to 300 copies, as well as an exclusive Mantic Axiom Reverb guitar/bass effects pedal limited to only 150 copies. This particular bundle also included its own special "half cyan/half blue" splatter vinyl LP limited to 150 copies as well. The other versions are a picture disc vinyl limited to 537 copies among a variety of bundle selections, and the standard "half bone/half black" splatter vinyl, the latter of which is available outside of any of the bundle options as a standalone purchase.

== Track listing ==
All tracks are written by At the Drive-In.

No.	Title	Length
1.	"No Wolf Like the Present"	3:39
2.	"Continuum"	4:02
3.	"Tilting at the Univendor"	3:26
4.	"Governed by Contagions"	3:27
5.	"Pendulum in a Peasant Dress"	3:41
6.	"Incurably Innocent"	3:26
7.	"Call Broken Arrow"	4:11
8.	"Holtzclaw"	3:49
9.	"Torrentially Cutshaw"	3:12
10.	"Ghost-Tape No. 9"	4:15
11.	"Hostage Stamps"	3:53
Total length:		41:01

== Personnel ==
At the Drive-In

- Cedric Bixler-Zavala – lead vocals
- Omar Rodríguez-López – guitar, production
- Keeley Davis – guitar
- Paul Hinojos – bass
- Tony Hajjar – drums, percussion

Technical

- Rich Costey – production, mixing
- Martin Cooke – engineering
- Nicolas Fournier – engineering
- Gentry Studer – mastering
- Damon Locks – cover art, illustrations, art direction
- Christopher Friedman – layout

== Charts ==
Chart (2017)	Peak position
Australian Albums (ARIA)	15
Austrian Albums (Ö3 Austria)	31
Belgian Albums (Ultratop Flanders)	64
Belgian Albums (Ultratop Wallonia)	63
French Albums (SNEP)	132
German Albums (Offizielle Top 100)	30
Italian Albums (FIMI)	82
New Zealand Heatseekers Albums (RMNZ)	8
Scottish Albums (Official Charts)	20
Swiss Albums (Schweizer Hitparade)	57
UK Albums (Official Charts)	30
UK Rock & Metal Albums (Official Charts)	1
US Billboard 200	39
US Independent Albums (Billboard)	2
US Top Rock Albums (Billboard)	9
