= Vaya (EP) =

EP by At the Drive-In
- Released: July 27, 1999
- Recorded: June 1998 – February 1999
- Studios: Rosewood Studios (El Paso, Texas); Doug Messenger’s Studio (Hollywood, California); Village Productions (Tornillo, Texas)
- Genres: Post-hardcore; emo; punk rock
- Length: 23:48
- Label: Fearless Records
- Producers: Mike Major, Alex Newport, Sean Cummings

At the Drive-In chronology
In/Casino/Out (1998)	Vaya (1999)	Sunshine / At the Drive-In (2000)

Vaya is the fourth EP by American post-hardcore band At the Drive-In, released in 1999.

== Writing ==
"198d" was written about drummer Tony Hajjar's grandmother, who was buried in a mass grave in Lebanon. The title was taken from an inscription on her gravestone.

The sound of the album bridges the musical gap between In/Casino/Out and their following album, Relationship of Command.

== Artwork ==
The EP's cover features a Conion 100CF boombox which belonged to the band, and was used as a frequent prop during Vaya period, appearing in their photoshoots, gig flyers and on stage during most of their live performances. Additionally, it would appear in the music video for "Metronome Arthritis" and was later featured on the label of their 2000 split 7-inch with The Murder City Devils as well as the cover of the 2005 compilation album This Station Is Non-Operational.

== Release ==
The EP was first released in 1999 by Fearless Records. To promote it, the band toured with Rage Against the Machine and the Foo Fighters in November and December 1999. It saw a limited of 500 vinyl release at 2012's Coachella Music Festival to celebrate the band's first performances together in 11 years. The 10-inch was then re-released as a hot-pink vinyl on June 5, 2012, with 1,500 copies in North American and 1,500 copies elsewhere. A vibrant red edition of 1,000 of the 10-inch was also available from Hot Topic stores.

Professional ratings
Review scores
Source	Rating
AllMusic	4/5 stars
LAS Magazine	Favorable

== Track listing ==
No.	Title	Length
1.	"Rascuache"	3:21
2.	"Proxima Centauri"	2:46
3.	"Ursa Minor"	3:22
4.	"Heliotrope"	3:12
5.	"Metronome Arthritis"	4:00
6.	"300 MHz"	3:03
7.	"198d"	4:04
Total length:		23:48

== Personnel ==
At the Drive-In

- Cedric Bixler-Zavala – lead vocals, percussion
- Jim Ward – guitars, keyboards, vocals
- Omar Rodríguez-López – guitars
- Paul Hinojos – bass guitar
- Tony Hajjar – drums, percussion

Other personnel

- Sean Cummings – production
- Alex Newport – production, recording engineer, mixing
- Mike Major – production, recording engineer, mixing
- Justin Leah – recording engineer
- Bobby Torres – recording engineer
- John Matousek – mastering
- Rick Robot – photography
- Paul Drake – photography
- Joe D Foster – layout

== Chart performance ==
Chart (2012)	Peak position
U.S. Billboard Vinyl Albums	2
