= In/Casino/Out =

Studio album by At the Drive-In
- Released: August 18, 1998
- Recorded: June 3–10, 1998
- Studios: Messenger's Studio, Hollywood, CA
- Genres: Post-hardcore; emo
- Length: 38:39
- Label: Fearless
- Producer: Alex Newport

At the Drive-In chronology
El Gran Orgo (1997)	In/Casino/Out (1998)	Vaya (1999)

Professional ratings
Review scores
Source	Rating
AllMusic	4/5 stars
Drowned in Sound	10/10

In/Casino/Out (stylized as in/CASINO/OUT) is the second studio album by the American post-hardcore band At the Drive-In, released on August 18, 1998, through Fearless Records. Produced by Alex Newport, it is the band's first full studio album to feature bass guitarist Paul Hinojos and drummer Tony Hajjar, who joined the band in 1996 for the tour in support of their debut album, Acrobatic Tenement, and appeared on the subsequent El Gran Orgo EP.

In/Casino/Out is a live-in-studio album, recorded as such with the intention of better capturing the energy and sound of the band's live shows. The album marks a middle ground between the raw, lo-fi production of Acrobatic Tenement and the sleeker sound of their third album, Relationship of Command.

In 2016, Rolling Stone placed the album at #20 in their "40 Greatest Emo Albums of All Time" list.

== Background and recording ==
During the recording of the album, At the Drive-In was initially unable to find a label willing to release it. By that point in time, Flipside, the label that issued Acrobatic Tenement, had ceased operations, and Offtime Records, which had released the El Gran Orgo EP the previous year, was not in the financial position to issue more releases. The group considered self-releasing the album until Fearless Records offered their support.

Recording for the album took place in early June 1998 at Messenger's Studio in Hollywood. The entire recording was done live by the band, with little to no overdubs. Production duties were held by Alex Newport, with assistance from Doug Messenger at Harddrive Analog in North Hollywood; Newport also mixed the album "half asleep" at Paramount in Hollywood.

In/Casino/Out was recorded in three days, with the band playing live in the studio and adding minimal vocal overdubs and guitar punch-ins afterwards.

Frontman Cedric Bixler-Zavala recalled in 2015 that the band were "rushed" during the sessions and unable to "execute maybe 30% of the ideas that were initially planned for the record because of a lack of time", though he also felt that the band benefited from the pressure.

In/Casino/Out marks founding member Jim Ward's return to the band after not appearing on El Gran Orgo; the In/Casino/Out track "Hourglass" was the first At the Drive-In song for which he provided lead vocals.

The lyrics of "Chanbara" were inspired by the Peruvian Shining Path guerrilla movement and its insurgency.

== Track listing ==
No.	Title	Length
1.	"Alpha Centauri"	3:13
2.	"Chanbara"	2:59
3.	"Hulahoop Wounds"	3:24
4.	"Napoleon Solo"	4:48
5.	"Pickpocket"	2:38
6.	"For Now..We Toast"	3:02
7.	"A Devil Among the Tailors"	3:12
8.	"Shaking Hand Incision"	3:36
9.	"Lopsided"	4:41
10.	"Hourglass"	3:25
11.	"Transatlantic Foe"	3:37
Total length:		38:39

Japanese edition bonus tracks
No.	Title	Length
12.	"Proxima Centauri"	2:48
13.	"Doorman's Placebo"	5:33
Total length:		47:00

== Personnel ==
At the Drive-In

- Cedric Bixler-Zavala – lead vocals
- Jim Ward – guitars, backing vocals, co-lead vocals; lead vocals and keyboards (10)
- Omar Rodríguez-López – guitars
- Paul Hinojos (credited as Pall) – bass guitar
- Tony Hajjar – drums, percussion

Additional musicians

- Angel Marcelo Rodríguez-Cheverez (credited as Marcelo Rodche) – percussion (2)
- Jeremy Ward – field recording (9)

Technical personnel

- Alex Newport – production, recording engineer, mixing
- John Golden – mastering engineer
- Taylor Crockett – photography
- Travis Keller – photography
- Emberly Modine – artwork, design
- At the Drive-In – design
- Cheryl Benson – layout

== Chart performance ==
Chart (2012)	Peak position
U.S. Billboard Vinyl Albums	1
