= Invalid Litter Dept. =

Single by At the Drive-In

from the album Relationship of Command
- Released: 12 March 2001 (UK)
- Genre: Post-hardcore, emo
- Length: 6:07
- Label: Grand Royal / Virgin; VUS193 (UK, 7-inch); VUSCD193 (UK, CD1); VUSDX193 (UK, CD2)
- Songwriter: At the Drive-In
- Producer: Ross Robinson

At the Drive-In singles chronology
"Rolodex Propaganda" (2000)	"Invalid Litter Dept." (2001)	"Governed by Contagions" (2016)

"Invalid Litter Dept." is a song by American rock band At the Drive-In, released in 2001 as the third single from the album Relationship of Command. The CD release in March 2001 came in a variety of international formats, including the standard two CDs in the United Kingdom. The Australian release included the UK B-sides from the two CD releases. "Invalid Litter Dept." is the band's highest charting single in the UK, peaking at No. 50 on the UK Singles Chart and No. 47 on the Scottish Singles Chart.

The song's lyrics and music video deal with the Juárez femicides, a series of rapes and murders in Ciudad Juárez, Mexico, of young women who worked in factories called maquiladoras. Cd. Juárez is located just across the U.S.-Mexican border from El Paso, Texas, At the Drive-In's home town. The song explicitly criticizes the federales, or the Mexican Federal Police, for their lack of response to these cases.

"Lamacq version" tracks originally broadcast on BBC Radio 1's The Evening Session with Steve Lamacq, week beginning 11 September 2000, and produced/mixed by Simon Askew.

== Track listing ==
=== U.S. / Australia CD ===
1. "Invalid Litter Dept." – 6:07
2. "Initiation" (Lamacq Version) – 3:36
3. "Quarantined" (Lamacq Version) – 5:55
4. "Take Up Thy Stethoscope and Walk" – 5:05
5. "Metronome Arthritis" – 4:03

=== UK 7-inch ===
1. "Invalid Litter Dept." – 6:07
2. "Initiation" (Lamacq version) – 3:36

=== UK CD1 ===
1. "Invalid Litter Dept." – 6:07
2. "Initiation" (Lamacq version) – 3:36
3. "Quarantined" (Lamacq version) – 5:55

=== UK CD2 ===
1. "Invalid Litter Dept." – 6:07
2. "Take Up Thy Stethoscope and Walk" – 5:05
3. "Metronome Arthritis" – 4:03
4. "At the Drive-In TV Ad" (video starring Michael Diamond)
