= Cryptomnesia (album) =

Studio album by Omar Rodríguez-López
- Released: May 5, 2009
- Recorded: 2006, 2008
- Genre: Progressive rock, experimental rock, math rock, noise rock
- Length: 36:26
- Label: Rodriguez Lopez Productions
- Producer: Omar Rodríguez-López

Omar Rodríguez-López solo chronology
Despair (2009)	Cryptomnesia (2009)	Los Sueños de un Hígado (2009)

Omar Rodríguez-López chronology
The Bedlam in Goliath (2008)	Cryptomnesia (2009)	Octahedron (2009)

Professional ratings
Review scores
Source	Rating
Allmusic	3.5/5 stars
Antiquiet.com	4.5/5 stars
DecoyMusic.com	4.5/5 stars
Pitchfork Media	(4.8/10)
Tiny Mix Tapes	4.5/5 stars
The New York Times	(positive)

Cryptomnesia is the debut studio album by El Grupo Nuevo de Omar Rodriguez Lopez, released on May 5, 2009. The album is the first of three albums recorded by the band, and is Rodriguez-Lopez' eleventh record overall. According to Rodriguez-Lopez, the album was "recorded in the summer of 2006, around the same time I did Old Money. It was a very, very fun record to make. I made that record in five or six days."

== Background ==
The band features Omar Rodríguez-López on guitar, Zach Hill (Hella) on drums, Jonathan Hischke (Hella) on synth bass, and Juan Alderete (The Mars Volta) on bass guitar. Additionally, Cryptomnesia features the vocals of guest frontman Cedric Bixler-Zavala on nine of the album's eleven tracks. Rodriguez-Lopez completed the album in 2006, shortly after finishing The Mars Volta's Amputechture. Bixler-Zavala's vocals were tracked in summer of 2008.

Regarding the release, Cedric Bixler-Zavala states: "if anyone's bummed that Octahedron is too simple or too pop, they can buy [this] album and it'll take them right back to that [heavier] kind of sound. It's one of my favourite things I've ever worked on. It's pretty much a Mars Volta record, just without Thomas [Pridgen], Ikey [Owens], and Marcel [Rodriguez-Lopez]."

A special limited advance vinyl offering of only 3,000 copies was made available exclusively to indie retail in honor of Record Store Day on April 18 and saw its official release on CD, vinyl, and digital everywhere on May 5, 2009. The album was made available for pre-order from hellomerch.com on April 8.

In the liner notes of the album, Omar states:

To soothe the symptoms of a cursed go-between, this magnetar of a record (an uncomfortable meditation on bad manners), was recorded in the foul summer of 2006. It then sat in my grotesquely overpopulated, roman holiday of a closet, awaiting its vocal tracks, which were finally realized in the illustrious Australian summer of 2008. Being predisposed to insults, I would like to say now that I love this record with all my guts and find it very much worth the wait (I hope you'll agree, though I sense some of you may not). This project, as many before it, though one small step in my (our) personal therapy, still bears the question: is our footing sure enough to be trusted?

== Track listing ==
All tracks are written by El Grupo Nuevo de Omar Rodriguez Lopez.

No.	Title	Length
1.	"Tuberculoids"	4:27
2.	"Half Kleptos"	3:09
3.	"Cryptomnesia"	6:02
4.	"They're Coming to Get You, Barbara"	4:08
5.	"Puny Humans"	2:31
6.	"Shake Is for 8th Graders"	2:12
7.	"Noir"	3:44
8.	"Paper Cunts"	2:51
9.	"Elderly Pair Beaten with Hammer"	2:03
10.	"Warren Oates"	4:55
11.	"Fuck Your Mouth"	0:23
Total length:		36:26

== Personnel ==
- Omar Rodriguez Lopez – guitars, keys
- Zach Hill – drums
- Cedric Bixler Zavala – vocals
- Juan Alderete – bass
- Jonathan Hischke – synth bass
