= Take Up Thy Stethoscope and Walk =

Pink Floyd song

Song by Pink Floyd

from the album The Piper at the Gates of Dawn
- Released: 4 August 1967
- Recorded: 20 and 29 March 1967, 18 July 1967
- Studio: EMI, London (Studio Three)
- Genre: Psychedelic rock
- Length: 3:05
- Label: EMI Columbia
- Songwriter: Roger Waters
- Producer: Norman Smith

"Take Up Thy Stethoscope and Walk" (Note: The US sleeve mistitles it as "Take Up My Stethoscope and Walk") is a song by English psychedelic rock band Pink Floyd from their debut album The Piper at the Gates of Dawn (1967).

== Background ==
"Take Up Thy Stethoscope and Walk" was originally titled "Doctor, Doctor". The song's title is a variation of John 5:8, a verse of the Bible detailing the healing of the paralytic at Bethesda in which Jesus instructs the paralytic to "take up thy bed and walk". It was the first song written by Roger Waters to be recorded by Pink Floyd. The phrase "doctor, doctor" would be re-used in Waters's 1992 solo album Amused to Death.

== Reception ==
When Andy Greene of Rolling Stone Australia ranked fifty terrible songs on great albums, he placed "Take Up Thy Stethoscope and Walk" at number twenty-eight, calling it a "grating tune" and "Judging by this song alone, nobody would have ever guessed that its author would take over the band in the seventies and turn them into one of the biggest acts in rock history. They were more likely to assume he was on the verge of a complete nervous breakdown." Waters later called it a "very bad song". When Nick Mason was interviewed about the Pink Floyd box set The Early Years 1965–1972, he thought it was "a really average song."

== Personnel ==
According to authors Jean-Michel Guesdon and Philippe Margotin:

- Roger Waters – bass, lead vocals
- Syd Barrett – electric rhythm and lead guitars, backing vocals
- Richard Wright – organ, backing vocals
- Nick Mason – drums

== Cover versions ==
=== At the Drive-In version ===
"Take Up Thy Stethoscope and Walk (BBC Sessions)"

Song by At the Drive-In

from the album This Station Is Non-Operational
- Released: 24 May 2005
- Genre: Post-hardcore; punk rock
- Length: 5:03
- Label: Fearless
- Songwriter: Roger Waters
- Producers: Ross Robinson; Mike Major; Simon Askew

American post-hardcore band At the Drive-In covered the song during their BBC sessions but never went released until their 2005 compilation album This Station Is Non-Operational.

=== Other versions ===
Ty Segall, alongside Mikal Cronin covered the song on his 2009 album The Traditional Fools/Reverse Shark Attack.

== Sources ==
- Blake, Mark (2008). Comfortably Numb: The Inside Story of Pink Floyd. Da Capo Press. ISBN 978-0-306-81752-6.
- Guesdon, Jean-Michel; Margotin, Philippe (2017). Pink Floyd All The Songs. Running Press. ISBN 9780316439237.
- Mabbett, Andy (1995). The Complete Guide to the Music of Pink Floyd (1st UK paperback ed.). Omnibus Press. ISBN 978-0-7119-4301-8.
- Povey, Glenn (2008) [2007]. Echoes: The Complete History of Pink Floyd. Mind Head Publishing. ISBN 978-0-9554624-1-2.
