= El Grupo Nuevo de Omar Rodriguez Lopez =

Puerto Rican progressive rock band (2006–2011)

El Grupo Nuevo de Omar Rodriguez-Lopez
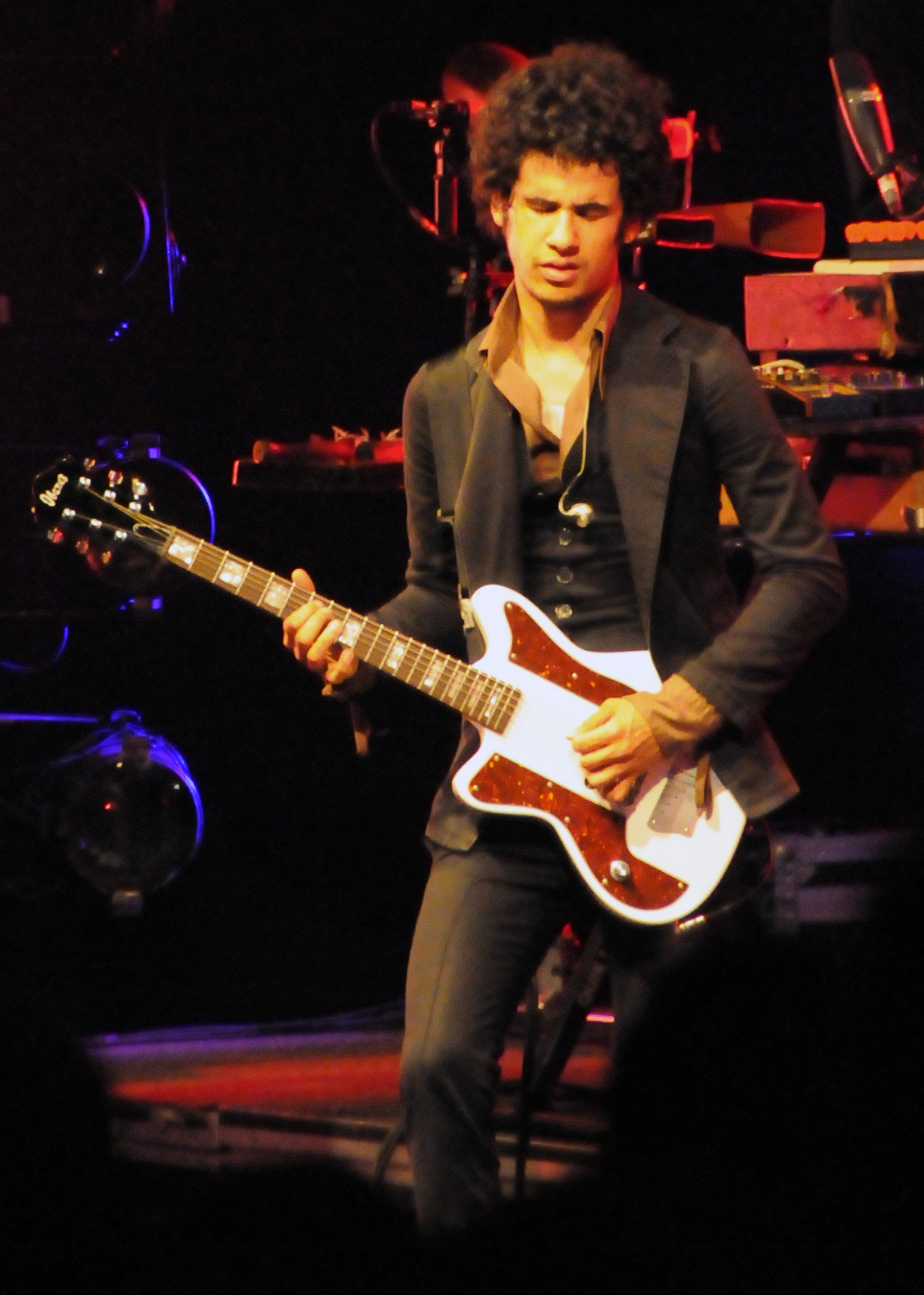
- Omar Rodríguez-López in 2008

Background information
- Origin: Bayamón, Puerto Rico
- Genres: Progressive rock; experimental rock; math rock
- Years active: 2006–2011
- Label: Rodriguez Lopez Productions
- Past members: Omar Rodríguez-López; Cedric Bixler-Zavala; Juan Alderete de la Peña; Jonathan Hischke; Zach Hill

El Grupo Nuevo de Omar Rodriguez Lopez was a band consisting of Omar Rodríguez-López (guitar), Cedric Bixler-Zavala (vocals), Juan Alderete de la Peña (bass guitar), Jonathan Hischke (synth bass) and Zach Hill (drums).

== History ==
Originally this side-project of Omar Rodríguez-López's was simply a collaboration with Hella drummer Zach Hill, but eventually Rodríguez-López formed an entire band, adding The Mars Volta bandmates and frequent collaborators — Cedric Bixler-Zavala and Juan Alderete de la Peña — as well as Hill's Hella colleague Jonathan Hischke to the lineup. Since 2006, three records have been recorded by the group, the first of which, titled Cryptomnesia, was released worldwide on May 5, 2009. In October 2010 Rodríguez-López and Hill were reportedly going back into the studio to record new El Grupo Nuevo tracks. The album presumably ended up being Mantra Hiroshima. The band were due to tour in Spring of 2011, but due to Hill's foot injury, the tour would end up becoming a secret TMV tour. Since then, the band has not released any new material, and no news has come of them.

== Discography ==
- Cryptomnesia (2009)
- Mantra Hiroshima (2010)
