= Diamanté (EP) =

EP by At the Drive-In
- Released: November 24, 2017
- Genre: Punk rock
- Length: 10:47
- Label: Rise Records
- Producer: Omar Rodriguez-Lopez

At the Drive-In chronology
in•ter a•li•a (2017)	Diamanté (2017)

Diamanté is the sixth EP by the American post-hardcore band At the Drive-In, released on November 24, 2017, through Rise Records. The November 24th release was in accordance with Record Store Day 2017. Ahead of the EP's release, the band issued a cryptic note regarding the recording: “How do you weaponize the insatiable thirst for life among vultures? How do you deprogram the coroner dissecting hiatus ? What light beckons you from the sewers of suggestion? Is your instinct extinct ? Or does it hide in the flash burn of counterfeit automatons? 5 boys with guilty slingshots swaying to the Midwitch Sound. Blinded by the DIAMANTÉ.” Diamanté is the last official recording from the band before going on indefinite hiatus.

The EP saw a limited 4,000 vinyl release for Record Store Day in 2017 in the United States. It was released for streaming in January 2018. It received generally favorable reviews.

== Track listing ==
Side A
No.	Title	Length
1.	"Amid Ethics"	3:30
2.	"Despondent at High Noon"	2:55

Side B
No.	Title	Length
1.	"Point of Demarkation"	4:22

== Personnel ==
Band

- Cedric Bixler-Zavala – lead vocals
- Omar Rodriguez-Lopez – guitar
- Paul Hinojos – bass
- Tony Hajjar – drums, percussion
- Keeley Davis – guitar

Engineering

- Omar Rodriguez-Lopez – producer
- Johann Scheerer – engineering, mixing
- Chris van Rautenkranz – mastering
- Flo Siller – mastering
- Linda Gerdes – recording, producer

Artwork

- Damon Locks – illustration
- Christopher Friedman – layout, design
