= At the Drive-In =

American post-hardcore band

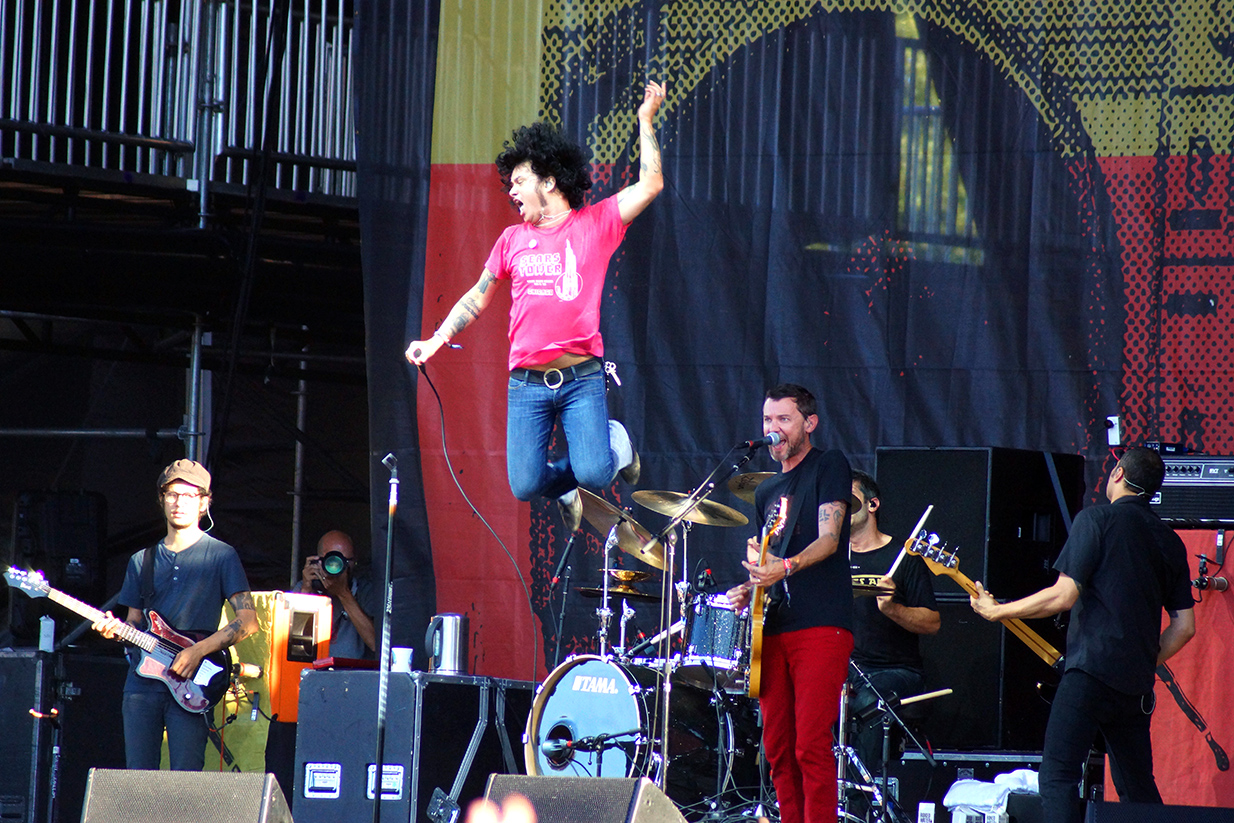
- At the Drive-In in 2012. L–R: Rodríguez-López, Bixler-Zavala, Ward, Hajjar, and Hinojos.

Background information
- Origin: El Paso, Texas, U.S.
- Genres: Post-hardcore; emo; art punk
- Years active: 1994–2001; 2012; 2016–2018
- Labels: Rise; Transgressive; Fearless; Grand Royal; Twenty-first Chapter
- Spinoffs: De Facto; The Mars Volta; Sparta; Antemasque
- Spinoff of: Foss
- Past members: Cedric Bixler-Zavala; Jim Ward; Omar Rodríguez-López; Paul Hinojos; Tony Hajjar; Keeley Davis; Jarrett Wrenn; Kenny Hopper; Bernie Rincon; Davy Simmons; Adam Amparan; Ryan Sawyer; Ben Rodriguez
- Website: atdimusic.com

At the Drive-In was an American post-hardcore band formed in 1994 in El Paso, Texas. Their last line-up consisted of Cedric Bixler-Zavala (vocals), Omar Rodríguez-López (guitar, vocals), Paul Hinojos (bass), Tony Hajjar (drums), and Keeley Davis (guitar, vocals). After several early line-up changes, the band solidified into a five-piece, consisting of Bixler-Zavala, Rodríguez-López, Jim Ward (guitar, keyboards, vocals), Hinojos and Hajjar.

At the Drive-In released three studio albums and five EPs before breaking up in 2001. Their third and final album before the split, 2000's Relationship of Command, received several accolades and is cited as a landmark of post-hardcore, alongside producing the successful single "One Armed Scissor". Following the breakup, Bixler-Zavala and Rodríguez-López formed the Mars Volta with Ward's cousin Jeremy, while Ward, Hinojos, and Hajjar formed Sparta; Hinojos would later leave Sparta for the Mars Volta.

At the Drive-In reunited in January 2012 and played the Coachella and Lollapalooza festivals that year before disbanding again. In 2016, the band reunited for a second time, with Ward replaced by Sparta's Keeley Davis; they released the album in•ter a•li•a the following year. The band announced an indefinite hiatus in November 2018.

== History ==
=== 1994–97: Formation and Acrobatic Tenement ===
At the Drive-In was founded in 1994 in El Paso, Texas, by guitarist Jim Ward and vocalist Cedric Bixler-Zavala. The band played its first live show on October 14, 1994, at The Attic in El Paso, followed by a show on the 15th at the Loretto High School Fair. They released the EP Hell Paso in November 1994. Following Hell Paso's release, the band members embarked on their first tour – a 2,000-mile trek across Texas. After a drummer change due to Bernie Rincon's death, At the Drive-In released its second EP ¡Alfaro Vive, Carajo! in June 1995. The band then set out on another tour, this one in a newly purchased 1981 Ford Econoline and spanning 42 days and 10,000 miles across the United States. During these tours, At the Drive-In began developing a large underground following by mostly playing in basements and small venues across the western United States, with their popularity spread by word of mouth among fans. One such show that changed the course of history for the band was in a now defunct bar in Los Angeles, where the band put on an explosive performance for just nine people – some of them employees of the Flipside record label. The staffers were so enthralled by the show that they offered to put out At the Drive-In's debut album then and there. After accepting the offer, the band first headed out on another 21-day tour of the Southwest; they then recorded Acrobatic Tenement in Los Angeles for $600.

The album was released on February 18, 1997; the band commenced another tour of the United States, spanning 100 days (February to June 1997) and 24,000 miles. This tour included shows with hundreds of other bands such as Screw 32, J Church, AFI, Still Life, Mustard Plug, Face to Face, and Cosmic Psychos. At the Drive-In's fan base began to swell with every show it performed. Following this tour, the band members took a month's vacation before rehearsing for their next record and subsequent tour. Following the recording of Acrobatic Tenement in July 1996, the final line-up of At the Drive-In fell into place with the addition of Tony Hajjar and Paul Hinojos and with Omar Rodríguez-López moving from bass to guitar. The EP El Gran Orgo, which did not feature Ward, was released on September 18, 1997, and "showed a more melodic side of the band, but the musical depth and heartfelt emotion was never more apparent." Two days after its release, the band was in Boulder, Colorado, playing a show with Welt to kick off its next 35-day, 11,000-mile tour that also included six dates with Karp and the Young Pioneers, and one-offs with Guttermouth, the Criminals, Piss Drunks, and the Humpers.

=== 1998–1999: In/Casino/Out and Vaya ===
By the time that the band were due to begin recording their second album, Flipside had stopped releasing new material and Offtime was financially unable to, "so the band figuratively approached almost every indie label they could think of" but could not find one willing to work with them. Eventually, Bob and Michelle Becker of Fearless Records saw At the Drive-In open for Supernova at a bar named Club Mesa. Despite Fearless's history of producing mainly pop punk bands, the band members "felt very comfortable with Bob and Michelle on a personal level" and a deal was signed. At the Drive-In began recording In/Casino/Out on June 3, 1998. With producer and mixer Alex Newport, the band spent four days recording at Doug Messenger's in North Hollywood and Revolver Recordings in Costa Mesa with engineer Andy Troy, and an additional two days mixing the album at Paramount in Hollywood. This album marked a notable maturation in At the Drive-In's sound and was recorded live with just a small number of overdubs. In/Casino/Out was chosen to be recorded live because, according to some sources, At the Drive-In struggled to capture the intensity and emotion of its live shows in the recording studio.

In/Casino/Out was released on August 18, 1998, although the band toured almost non-stop from July until December, playing shows with bands like Knapsack and The Murder City Devils. At the Drive-In took a couple month break until March 1999, at which point they kicked off another tour with a two-week stint with Jimmy Eat World in the United States until they headed to Europe for a six-week tour spanning eleven countries.

Upon returning to the United States, At the Drive-In played a handful of shows before returning to the studio to record the EP Vaya, which was released on July 13, 1999. The band then began another tour on July 28 at Emo's in Austin, Texas.

At the Drive-In signed with Digital Entertainment Network, known as DEN, an internet-focused entertainment company whose music division was led by music industry veteran Gary Gersh. In October of 1999, the band relocated to Los Angeles. November and December of that year saw At the Drive-In open for Rage Against the Machine, getting the chance to play arenas for the first time. Afterwards, the band toured with the Get Up Kids.

=== 2000–2001: Relationship of Command ===
Recording for the band's third album, Relationship of Command, began on January 17, 2000. The recording took place at Indigo Ranch Studios in Malibu, California, with producer Ross Robinson. Relationship of Command was recorded over a seven-week period and featured Iggy Pop with minor parts on a couple of the album's songs.

While At the Drive-In was working on the album, however, DEN went under. Relationship of Command would instead be released by the Beastie Boys-founded Grand Royal, which Rodríguez-López described as "our dream come true," since the band had long admired Grand Royal and had hoped to sign to them long before being approached by DEN. The album, released on September 12, 2000, was met with critical acclaim.

In addition to touring worldwide in Europe, Japan, and the United States following the release of Relationship of Command, At The Drive-In performed on several television shows. The band's first nationally televised performance was on Farmclub, a now defunct television show which aired late at night on the USA Network. After that performance, they also appeared on Later with Jools Holland, Late Night with Conan O'Brien and the Late Show with David Letterman. Additionally, the minor hit "One Armed Scissor" had circulation on MTV and significantly contributed to the band's popularity. By 2002, Relationship of Command had sold 273,000 copies in the United States, according to Nielsen SoundScan.

=== 2001-2009: Break-up and other projects ===
On November 12, 2000, the band's touring van skidded out of control on ice and flipped onto its roof. Though the accident left the band shaken, none of the members sustained serious injury; Hajjar and Bixler-Zavala were taken to the hospital for minor injuries but released soon after. In January 2001, At the Drive-In traveled to Australia for the Big Day Out festival. While performing at the festival in Sydney, they told the audience to calm down and observe the safety rules against moshing; when the audience did not cease moshing, Bixler-Zavala told them, "You're a robot, you're a sheep!" and bleated at them several times before the band left the stage after only three songs. "I think it's a very, very sad day when the only way you can express yourself is through slam-dancing", he proclaimed. The following month, At the Drive-In cancelled the last five dates of its European tour, citing the "complete mental and physical exhaustion" of the members.

In March 2001, less than a month away from a United States tour set to begin on April 14, At the Drive-In announced an indefinite hiatus at the height of their popularity thus far. The band had played their final show of the preceding world tour on February 21, 2001, in Groningen, the Netherlands. Rodríguez-López said: "After a non-stop six-year cycle of record/tour/record/tour, we are going on an indefinite hiatus. We need time to rest up and re-evaluate, just to be human beings again and to decide when we feel like playing music again." However, in 2002 Hajjar stated that the band had split for good, with the idea of this being a temporary hiatus "just press crap".

Though many of his bandmates cited exhaustion due to excessive touring as the main factor behind At the Drive-In's dissolution, Rodríguez-López instead pointed to creative differences: "we broke up at least three or four other times before we finally broke up. There were three or four times where I or Cedric or Cedric and I both talked about leaving the group because our desires were so different [from the rest of the band]." Bixler-Zavala and Rodríguez-López had stated that they wanted their next album to sound like Pink Floyd's The Piper at the Gates of Dawn.

Bixler-Zavala and Rodríguez-López subsequently focused on their dub side project De Facto, which also included Ward's cousin Jeremy Ward, before forming The Mars Volta. Jim Ward, Hinojos, and Hajjar formed Sparta in June 2001; Hinojos later left Sparta to join The Mars Volta from 2005 to 2009. The Mars Volta disbanded in 2013, and Rodríguez-López went on to play with Bosnian Rainbows while Bixler-Zavala started Zavalaz. Bixler-Zavala and Rodríguez-López eventually reconciled and formed Antemasque in 2014; The Mars Volta reunited in secret in 2019 and resumed public activity in 2022.

=== 2009–2012: First reunion ===
During an interview with Drowned in Sound in June 2009, Bixler-Zavala stated that he had been in discussions with the band's former members and suggested that they could get back together after they sorted out their finances. He added, "I wouldn't mind it. It might happen, we just have to iron out a lot of personal things. A lot of it we've dealt with already and I've apologized for a lot of things I've said and the way it ended... we'll see what happens." Ward quickly quashed rumors of a reunion by stating, "I don't think that I'll be answering any questions or doing any interviews anymore, thank you very much. I haven't got much to say about anything except with songs which I will continue to make and release."

At the Drive-in reunited in late 2011 and officially announced their reunion on January 9, 2012. They played their first show since 2001 on April 9 at Red 7 in Austin, Texas, as part of a short tour of Texas with Zechs Marquise. On April 15 and 22, the band performed at the Coachella festival. Later in the year At the Drive-in also performed at festivals such as Lollapalooza, Splendour in the Grass, Fuji Rock and Reading and Leeds Festival. The band had also acquired the rights from Fearless Records to reissue their three studio albums and the EP Vaya, and launched their own label, Twenty-first Chapter, to handle the reissues. The name of the label is a reference to the chapter omitted from the US version of A Clockwork Orange.

While the reunion shows were met with mostly positive reviews, Rodríguez-López received criticism from fans and observers for his evident lack of enthusiasm while playing on stage. Initially, this was attributed to the recent death of his mother; however, Rodríguez-López later stated that he also no longer felt connected with At the Drive-in's music. He also ruled out the possibility of the band recording new material.

Following the dissolution of the Mars Volta in 2013, Bixler-Zavala and Rodríguez-López initially ceased all contact with each other. Bixler-Zavala blamed Rodríguez-López for the breakup, though he stated that he was still happy with At the Drive-In's reunion: "Proof was in MY performance. I would never get on stage if my heart was elsewhere." The two remained on non-speaking terms until reconciling in early 2014. An initial attempt to restart At the Drive-In did not work out, however, so Bixler-Zavala and Rodríguez-López went on to form Antemasque, touring and recording for the next two years.

=== 2015–2018: Second reunion and in•ter a•li•a ===
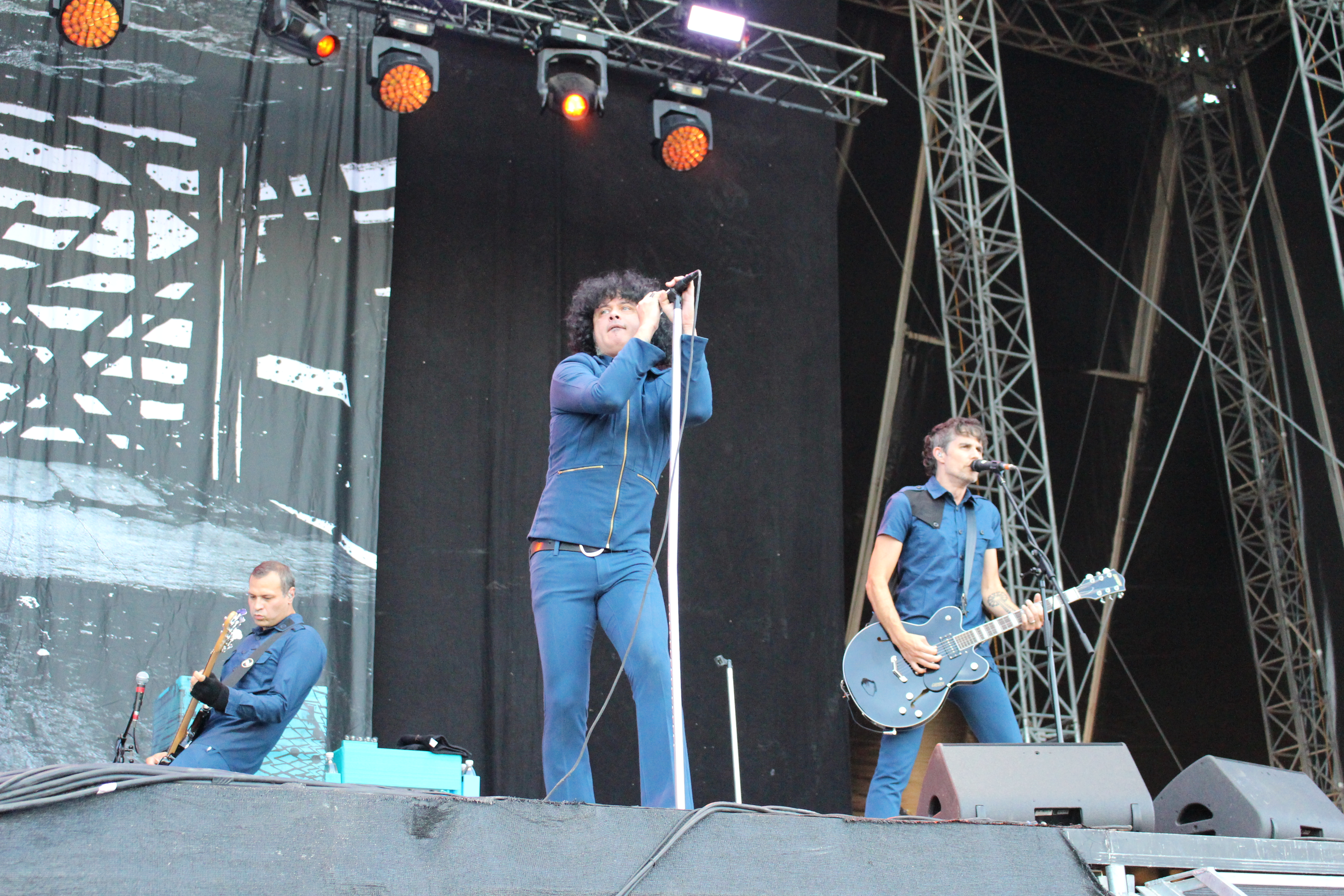
At the Drive-In performing in 2017

In October 2015, At the Drive-In agreed on doing another reunion, and an appearance at Rock On The Range festival in the following May was scheduled. In January 2016, trailed by a 15-second video of seemingly new music, the band detailed plans for a world tour and new album later in the year. After initial rehearsals, Jim Ward was removed from the reunited band, and was replaced by his former Sparta bandmate Keeley Davis.

In 2017, Bixler-Zavala stated that Ward was not ready for a new album and tour: "His head wasn't there. His head wasn't trustworthy. Because of the way Omar and I exploded [with the Mars Volta], I completely understood that. You know, you either let it go and keep going forward, or the train goes on without you. We have to honor what is happening now, which is age and the want to do it. I love him. He's a beautiful human being. A beautiful artist. I just wish he would remember that he's an amazing guitar player. I don't know if he does." Reflecting upon his departure years later, Ward later stated: "Even if all five of us talked about it, I’m not sure we’d understand what happened. What I do know is that I wasn’t in a good place mentally, but that doesn’t mean I couldn’t have done my job. But I think getting kicked out, as painful as it was, was probably a blessing in disguise. A lot of things have happened since that have been beneficial. It’s why I don’t hold any bad feelings. I still don’t speak to Omar and Cedric but if either of them called me and said they needed a kidney, I’d be on the first plane. I have a connection and a love for them that is beyond any drama."

The band canceled part of their North American tour after Bixler-Zavala began to have issues with his voice. On December 8, the band released their first new song in 16 years, "Governed by Contagions", through Rise Records. A new album, in•ter a•li•a, was released on May 5, 2017, preceded by another single, "Incurably Innocent". The Diamanté EP was released on November 24 as part of Record Store Day; it had a limited vinyl release of 4000 copies. In August 2017, the reunited band performed at Rock en Seine in Paris, and in May 2018, the band headlined the Neon Desert Music Festival.

=== 2018–present: Hiatus and uncertain future ===
During a performance on November 17, 2018, at the Circo Voador in Rio de Janeiro, Bixler-Zavala announced to the crowd that the following night's show would be the band's last for the foreseeable future. That night, he posted on Twitter: "Maybe it's a sign of weakness to some of you but I had to give a huge thank you to my ATDI family. This was our 2nd to last show. Tomorrow is the last. Don't know when we'll play again. Thank you Rio. How do I even sleep now?" The following day, the band played their final show at Bar Opinião in Porto Alegre. On November 19, the band released a statement on their official Instagram announcing a hiatus.

In 2025, Bixler-Zavala stated that he would be against playing any future shows with At The Drive-In, saying that the band's history was "permanently sealed forever".

== Musical style and influences ==
At the Drive-In's music has been described as post-hardcore, emo, post-punk, and art punk. Some of the group's key influences were Indian Summer, Swing Kids, Fugazi, Sunny Day Real Estate (referred to by Ward as "Fugazi beyond Fugazi"), Bad Brains, and the Gravity Records-led post-hardcore sound of the 1990s that featured acts such as Antioch Arrow and Heroin. In their last period before their initial breakup, further influences included Drive Like Jehu, Hot Snakes, and The Nation of Ulysses; according to Bixler-Zavala, "there would be no Relationship of Command without Drive Like Jehu." The band also performed cover versions of songs such as "This Night Has Opened My Eyes" by The Smiths and "Take Up Thy Stethoscope and Walk" by Pink Floyd, both included in the 2004 compilation This Station Is Non-Operational. Their name was taken from the fact that Bad Brains took their name from the Ramones' song "Bad Brain" (from Road to Ruin), and Bixler-Zavala liked the Bad Brains' song title "At the Movies" (featured in Rock for Light), while Ward liked "at the drive-in" from the chorus of the Poison song "Talk Dirty to Me" and his suggestion would eventually win out.

Though In/Casino/Out was recorded live, "Relationship of Command may very well be the first record to harness the chaotic balance of adrenaline and intellect of ATDI's live performance." "Ross was instrumental in bringing out a lot of feeling from us," Bixler-Zavala recalls. "We channeled a lot of emotion into this record. He pushed us farther than we thought we could go. I learned to cut loose the way we do live and not to be afraid to break something or whatever." While capturing the essence of their live shows in a way never before seen, the record also featured some of the band's most experimental songs, including "Rolodex Propaganda," "Non-Zero Possibility," and "Invalid Litter Dept."

The band's guitar work is characterized by unusual chords, a fast tempo, and a quiet-loud-quiet song structure. While Ward and Hinojos provided the rhythmic structure of the song, Rodríguez-López often played more experimental riffs and melodies over the top. Effects were heavily used by Rodríguez-López, especially on Relationship of Command, while Ward often alternated between guitar and keyboards.

== Legacy ==
At the Drive-In is considered one of the most influential post-hardcore artists of the late 1990s and early 2000s. Accolades for their album Relationship of Command include being ranked 47th in the 50 Greatest Albums of the 21st century in Kerrang!, 83rd on Spin Magazine's 100 Greatest Albums 1985–2005, and 90 on MTV2's greatest albums ever list. BBC's Mike Diver stated that the success and eventual "landmark status" of the album helped post-hardcore position itself as a "vital commercial force," adding that Relationship of Command "is the high against which every post-hardcore record since 2000 has been measured."

In October 2011, Rock Sound magazine inducted Relationship of Command into Rock Sound's Hall Of Fame. Their writer Ryan Bird spoke about the legacy of the album, stating that "though At the Drive-In may not have built the road, they were most certainly leading the convoy, allowing those who followed behind to reap the benefits [sic] of their navigation while they crashed and burned on the hard shoulder. What remains, however, is a legacy the likes of which may not been seen again."

Among the artists who have cited At the Drive-In as an influence or expressed admiration for them are …And You Will Know Us by the Trail of Dead, Thursday, Billy Talent, Biffy Clyro, Underoath, Will Swan of Dance Gavin Dance, Nick Hipa of As I Lay Dying, The Fall of Troy, Jamie Lenman, Rolo Tomassi, La Dispute, Mutiny on the Bounty, sleepmakeswaves, Jarvis Cocker, Night Verses, and St Vincent.

== Band members ==
Final lineup

- Cedric Bixler-Zavala – lead vocals, occasional guitar, melodica, percussion (1994–2001, 2012, 2016–2018)
- Omar Rodríguez-López – guitar, tambourine, backing vocals (1996–2001, 2012, 2016–2018); bass guitar (1995–1996)
- Paul Hinojos – bass guitar (1996–2001, 2012, 2016–2018)
- Tony Hajjar – drums, percussion (1996–2001, 2012, 2016–2018)
- Keeley Davis – guitar, backing vocals (2016–2018)

Former

- Jim Ward – guitar, backing and lead vocals (1994–1996, 1997–2001, 2012), keyboards (1998–2001, 2012)
- Kenny Hopper – bass (1994–1995)
- Jarrett Wrenn – guitar (1994–1995)
- Adam Amparan – guitar (1995–1996)
- Ben Rodriguez – guitar, backing vocals (1996–1997)
- Bernie Rincon – drums (1994–1995; died 1995)
- Davy Simmons – drums (1995)
- Ryan Sawyer – drums (1996)

== Discography ==
- Acrobatic Tenement (1997)
- In/Casino/Out (1998)
- Relationship of Command (2000)
- in•ter a•li•a (2017)

== See also ==
- Antemasque
- De Facto
- El Grupo Nuevo de Omar Rodriguez Lopez
- The Mars Volta
- Omar Rodriguez Lopez Group
- Sparta
- Bosnian Rainbows
