= Cedric Bixler-Zavala =

American singer (born 1974)

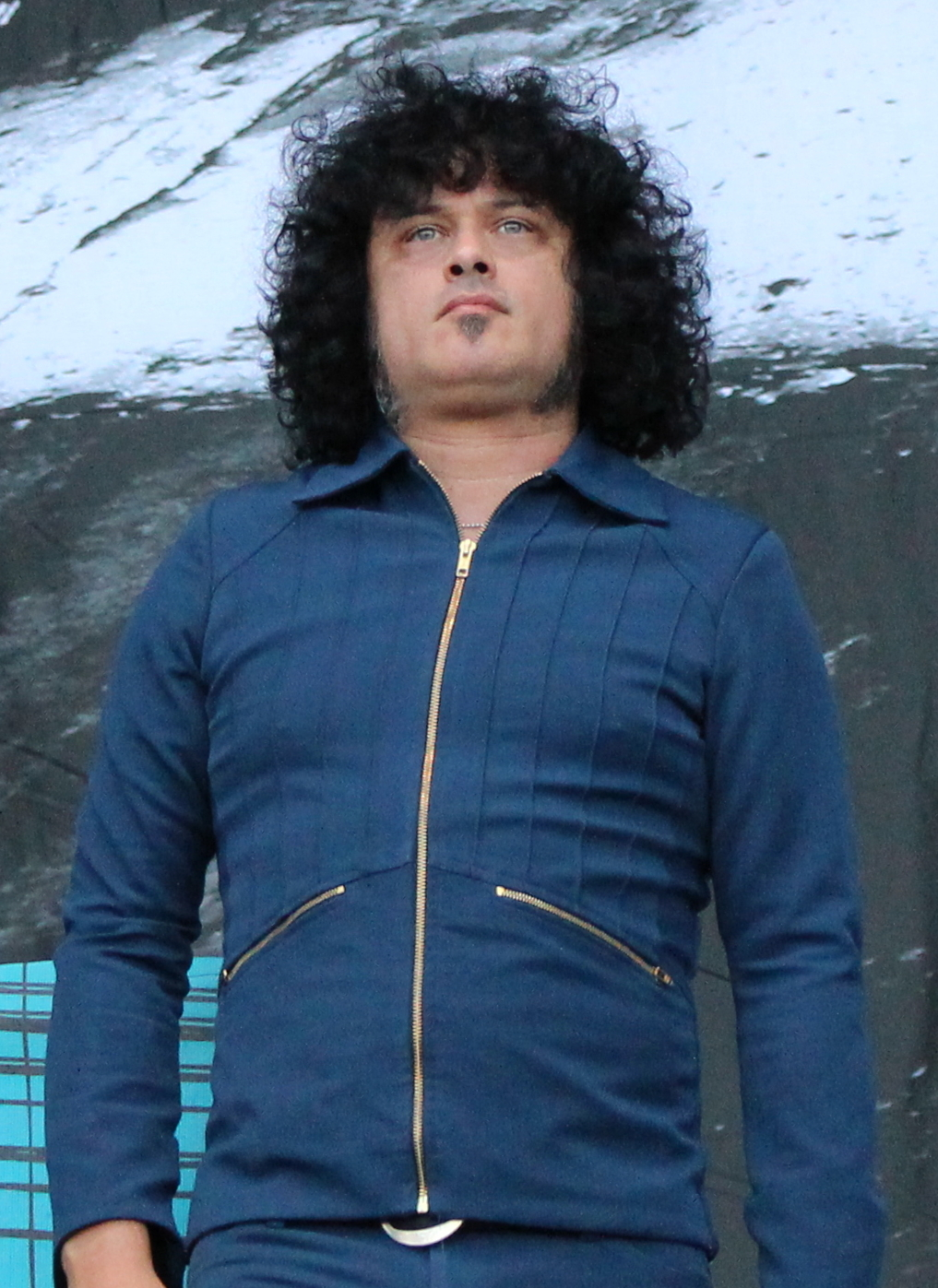
- Bixler-Zavala with At the Drive-In in 2017

Background information
- Born: November 4, 1974 (age 52); Redwood City, California, U.S.
- Origin: El Paso, Texas, U.S.
- Genres: Progressive rock; post-hardcore; alternative rock; experimental rock
- Occupations: Singer; musician; songwriter
- Instruments: Vocals; guitar; drums; percussion; melodica
- Years active: 1993–present
- Member of: The Mars Volta
- Formerly of: At the Drive-In; Antemasque; Anywhere; Big Sir; De Facto; Los Dregtones; Foss; The Fall on Deaf Ears; Thee Gambede Meatleak; El Grupo Nuevo de Omar Rodriguez Lopez; Omar Rodriguez-Lopez Group; Zavalaz

Cedric Bixler-Zavala (born November 4, 1974) is an American musician. He has been the lead singer and lyricist of the progressive rock band The Mars Volta since its inception in 2001. He was the lead singer and only constant member of the post-hardcore group At the Drive-In, the lead singer of the band Antemasque, and is a frequent collaborator with musician Omar Rodriguez-Lopez.

== Early life ==
Cedric Bixler-Zavala was born as Cedric Bixler in Redwood City, California. His father, Dennis Bixler-Marquez, was born in Mexico City to a white American man of partial German ancestry, and a Mexican woman. His mother, Rosa Zavala, is Mexican-American and was born in El Paso. His father is a professor of Chicano Studies at University of Texas, El Paso. His parents were bilingual, but Bixler-Zavala says his command of proper Spanish is limited to "Spanglish". His Spanish maternal surname, Zavala, is a Castilian version of the Basque family name Zabala.

Bixler-Zavala is a high school dropout. While attending high school, he was involved in the El Paso punk scene, playing in a number of local bands. This is where he met lifelong friend and collaborator Omar Rodriguez-Lopez, whom he has known since the age of thirteen.

== Career ==
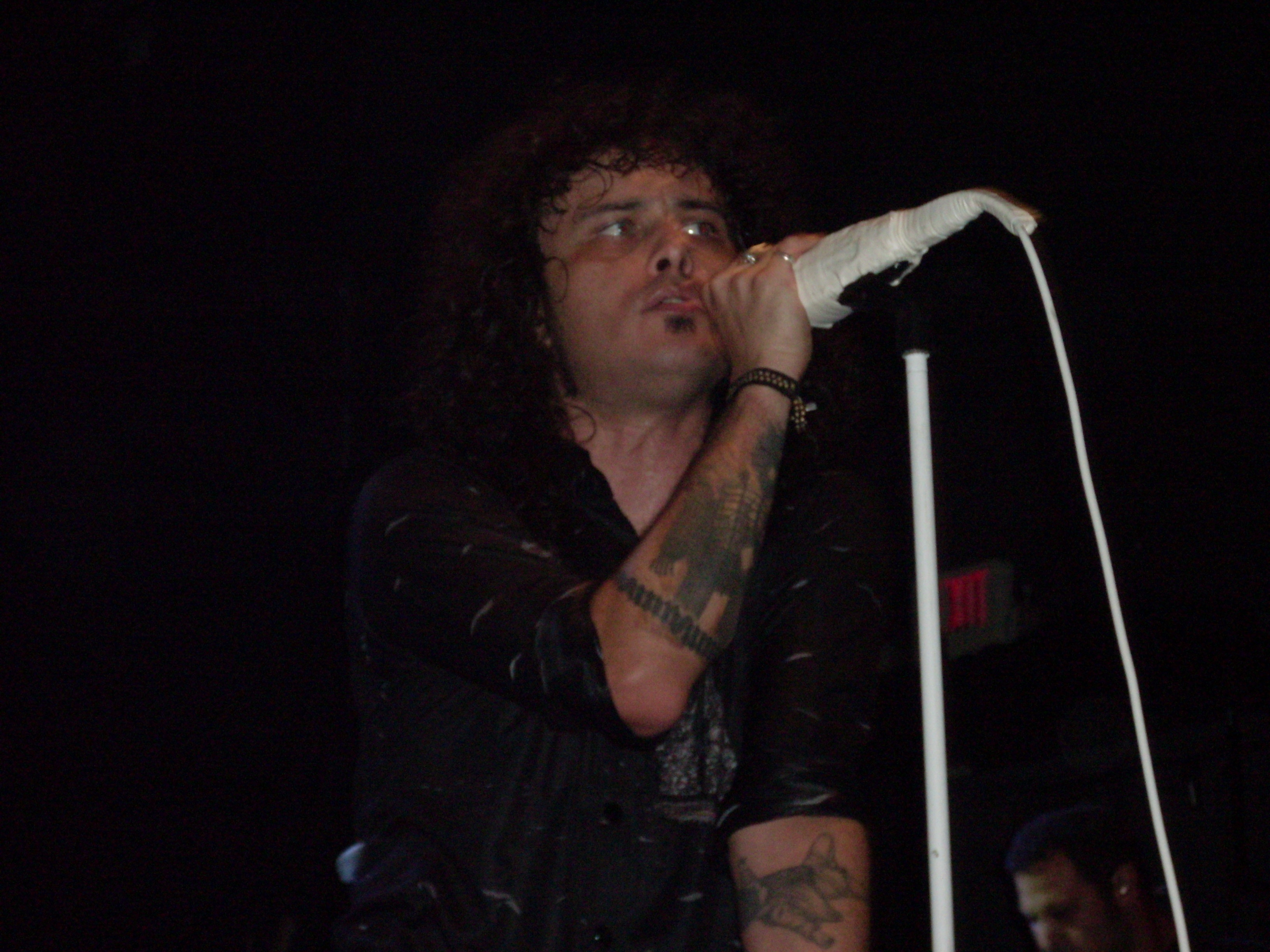
Bixler-Zavala performing in 2008

In the 1990s, Bixler-Zavala played in a slew of local, El Paso punk bands such as Distorted Silence, Three Blind Bats, Phantasmagoria, Jerk, Marcellus Wallace, Thee Gambede Meatleak, The Fall on Deaf Ears, and Los Dregtones, the latter of whom released the cassette, 5 Song Alibi, in 1994. The Fall on Deaf Ears recorded only a handful of songs before bassist Laura Beard and guitarist Sarah Reiser were killed in a car wreck in 1997.

Reflecting on when he first joined Phantasmagoria, Bixler-Zavala stated, "I joined these guys when I was 15 years old. They poached me from a band I was singing for called Distorted Silence . . . Distorted Silence was playing in front of the monkeys at the El Paso zoo and it was kinda my audition for them. You can't learn how to be in a band through music school. You have to just live it. Wether [sic] it be robbing music stores for gear, fighting with other bands, getting chased by the police, and learning how to live in the moment & that's what we did. These people are my heroes and my teachers."

In the early 1990s, Bixler-Zavala played drums and was a vocalist for a band named Foss which included Beto O'Rourke on bass before the latter's political career. He cites O'Rourke as a source of influence, stating, "The way I make art, I learned it from Beto. He was learning as he went along, too, but he was sort of my older brother/mentor."

In 1994, Jim Ward, along with Bixler-Zavala, created the band At the Drive-In. They performed their first live show on October 14, 1994, at The Attic in El Paso. At the Drive-In would go on to release four studio albums and six EPs. Relationship of Command, the band's most successful record, would go on to be certified gold in Australia and the United Kingdom. It was also deemed the 37th most influential album of all time by Kerrang!. Bixler-Zavala provides harmonious, emotive vocals and surreal lyrics to the record.

He co-founded the dub reggae band De Facto in 1998 which incorporated elements of instrumental dub, electronica, Latin and salsa music, and jazz fusion. Bixler-Zavala played both bass and drums at different points in the band's incarnation. The band reunited for a one-off show in 2024 at the SXSW festival.

Bixler-Zavala and Rodriguez-Lopez formed the progressive rock band The Mars Volta in 2001 after the dissolution of At the Drive-In. The band is known for their energetic live shows and concept albums, with Bixler-Zavala frequently demonstrating his frenetic antics onstage. Live performances usually incorporate extended jams and added lyrics. The Mars Volta have released nine studio albums and two EPs to date. The band's first album, De-Loused in the Comatorium, is certified gold in Canada and certified silver in the United Kingdom. Their second album, Frances the Mute, is certified gold in the United States. The band is also known for their experimentation in various other genres. The lyrics are characterized by Bixler-Zavala's signature esoteric, surrealist, and poetic lines which incorporate portmanteaus and imaginative narratives. These themes have also appeared in his writing. In particular, De-Loused in the Comatorium, a storybook written about the album, has been described as William Burroughs-esque.

A frequent collaborator with childhood friend Omar Rodriguez-Lopez, Bixler-Zavala has appeared on many albums of the former's solo discography. Notably, El Grupo Nuevo de Omar Rodriguez-Lopez's record, Cryptomnesia, is a unique entry into both of the musician's catalogues as it features elements of math rock and noise rock while implementing voice recordings. In addition to his vocal work, Bixler-Zavala contributed drums to at least of two of Rodriguez-Lopez's albums, El Bien y Mal Nos Une and Solid State Mercenaries.

Under the pseudonym "Alavaz Relxib Cirdec" ("Cedric Bixler-Zavala" backwards), Bixler-Zavala contributed a two-song single to the GSL Special 12-inch Singles Series, released in December 2005. Closer to the dub of De Facto and the ambient experimentation shown in Omar Rodríguez-López's records than the prog-rock of The Mars Volta, the two songs Bixler-Zavala has produced under this alias are entirely instrumental.

In 2010, he commented on Facebook about the recording process:

This is my failed attempt at ghost noted shuffeling Tony Allen beats! Ha! There is a digital tabla machine running through some DD-5 delay pedal that is being played by a mini hand held tape recorder playing throughout! I wrote the bass line...hummed it to Juan...Omar came up with the guitar and chorus section and Adrian played flute on it. It was squeezed in during tracking drums for Amputechture, and rushed...very very rushed. I had other parts and chorus bits but I didn't want to get in the way of the record (studio time is expensive!). The samples are from 2 places [...] On "Private Booths" the samples at the start are from an interview with a psychic who participated in the Montauk Project...I sampled it from a UK TV show called Disinformation (RIP!) [...] The other sample is from a movie called Shock Corridor by the late Sam Fuller. Side 2 "Sapta Loka" is a bit of an homage to ambient German music from the [1970s] ... it's one long drone spliced in four places and stacked on each other playing at the same time. A shitty Casio and a banged up Chaos pad (very 2005!) are being run and it's all recorded through a hand held mini recorder dumped onto a ProTools file. [...] Omar co-wrote the piece.

Late 2011 saw the release of the first 7-inch record from Bixler-Zavala's new project Anywhere, a collaboration with Christian Eric Beaulieu of Triclops! and Mike Watt of The Stooges, Firehose, and Minutemen. Their self-titled debut album was released by ATP Records in June 2012. Bixler-Zavala contributed drums to one track on the band's second album, Anywhere II, released in 2018.

In 2011, Bixler-Zavala began working on another album, which he described as "mostly ballady type stuff... a very Sunday morning record. Very soft." Eventually the solo project turned into a full-fledged band named Zavalaz, which features Bixler-Zavala on lead vocals and guitar, Dan Elkan on guitar, Juan Alderete on bass, and Gregory Rogove on drums. The band performed a number of West Coast tour dates throughout June, supported by Dot Hacker and EV Kain. On June 3, 2013, a snippet from song "Blue Rose of Grand Street" off their upcoming album All the Nights We Never Met was released on YouTube. The album remains unreleased to date.

Bixler-Zavala contributed vocals on two tracks on Nobody's 2013 album, Vivid Green, that being Our Last Dance and the bonus track Aways Away. The songs have been described as psychedelic synthpop, spacy, and "woozily soulful."

After a brief falling out with Rodriguez-Lopez, the two eventually reunited and formed the supergroup Antemasque in 2014. The band consisted of Bixler-Zavala, Rodriguez-Lopez, ex-Mars Volta drummer Dave Elitch, and Marfred Rodriguez-Lopez, younger brother of Omar. The band recorded and released their debut album that same year. Fans at the time postulated that as Flea and Elitch had previously played with The Mars Volta, a reunion of the then-defunct band might have been in the works. Flea played bass on 2003's De-loused in the Comatorium and trumpet on 2005's Frances the Mute. Elitch toured with The Mars Volta from 2009 to 2010. In February 2018, Bixler-Zavala confirmed on Twitter that The Mars Volta would reunite, but later clarified that At the Drive-In activity would take immediate precedence. The Mars Volta officially reunited in 2022 and have remained active ever since.

In 2025, Bixler-Zavala collaborated with Steve Lyman to provide vocals on the 2026 album SIGNAL TO BURNING. Tigran Hamasyan and Nathan Schram also appear on the record, which has been described as experimental. HOMECOMING and BIRDS SINGING ON THE MOON were the first two singles released ahead of the album's debut.

He has also made guest appearances on a number of other artist's song, ranging from Mastodon to Jonny Polonski. Bixler-Zavala, as well as other members of The Mars Volta, contributed to the Sympathy for Delicious soundtrack.

In addition to his work as a vocalist and lyricist, Bixler-Zavala has also performed as a drummer, contributing to projects such as Anywhere, Big Sir, De Facto, The Fall on Deaf Ears, Foss, Los Dregtones, RJs Prospectors, Lisa Papineau, and Omar Rodríguez-López. He is also capable of playing a number of other instruments.

== Artistry ==
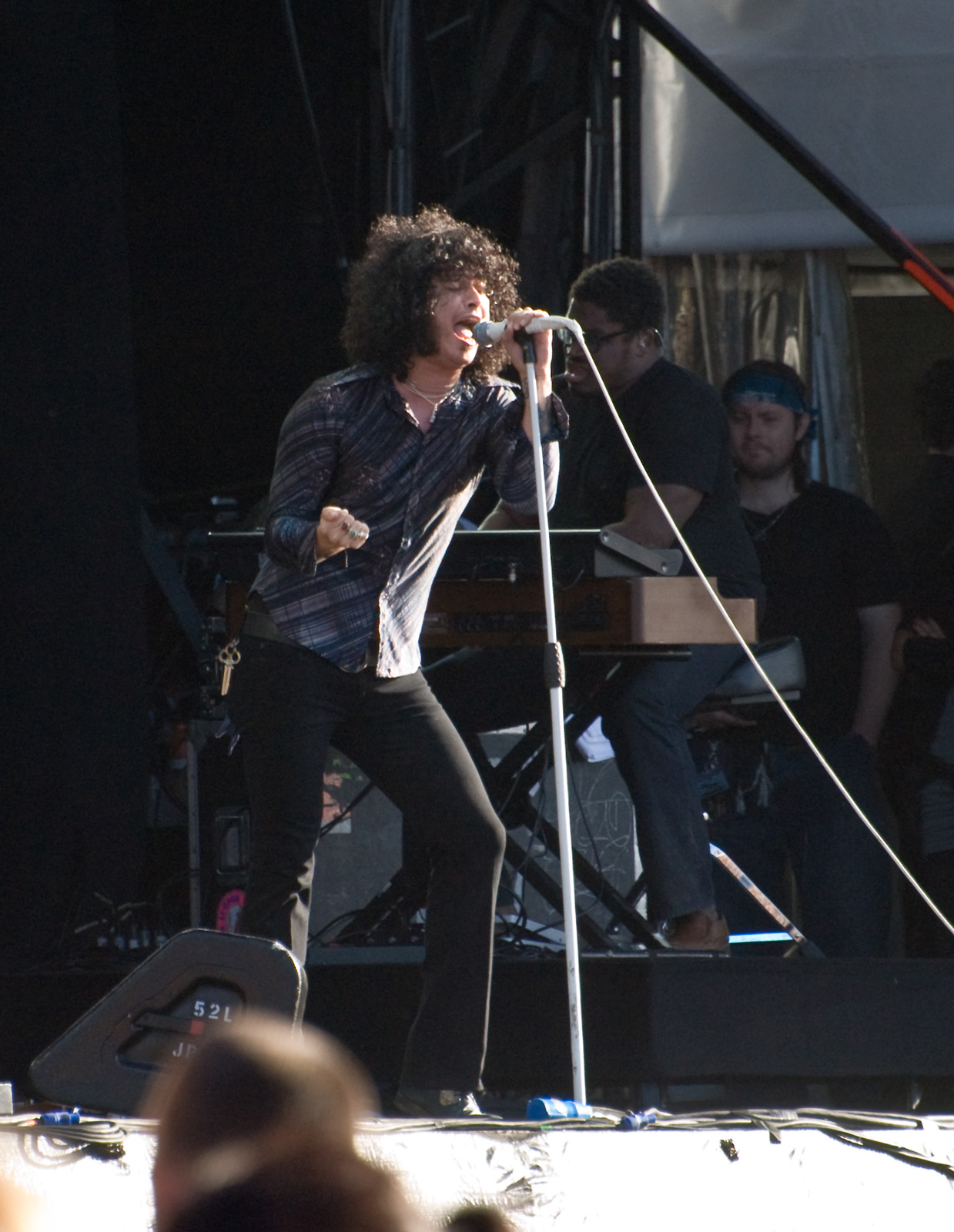
Bixler-Zavala at Big Day Out in 2010 with The Mars Volta

Bixler-Zavala has a tenor voice type with a vocal range spanning from G#2 to D6, in addition to a speculated possible range reaching as low as E2 and as high as C7. His vocal work spans many different styles, ranging from consistent rhythmic shouts (common in his singing with At the Drive-In) to controlled falsetto and head voice singing (a familiar trademark of his singing with the Mars Volta). In 2016, it was also revealed that Bixler-Zavala developed vocal nodules, causing shows to be canceled while on tour.

Bixler-Zavala is fond of Frank Zappaesque humor and writes in English, Spanglish, and Latin. His lyrics have a wide vocabulary and often feature complicated wordplay. Bixler-Zavala also uses portmanteaus: combining existing words, or parts of words, to create a new word. The song "Noctourniquet", for example, combines "nocturnal" (active at night) and "tourniquet" (a medical device to stop bleeding). He has stated: "I love to take common sayings, pervert them, mutate them a little. So you think I am singing one thing, but when you read it, it is different." He has described Mark E. Smith of The Fall as "one of the pillars of influence for me as a lyricist".

When performing with At the Drive-in and The Mars Volta, Bixler-Zavala is known for his eccentric on-stage behavior. He frequently does somersaults on stage, swings his microphone (once unintentionally hitting bandmate Ikey Owens in the head), throws objects such as cymbals, microphone stands, and trash cans into the audience, salsa dances, adjusts Omar Rodríguez-López's effects pedals and occasionally plays the maracas.

== Personal life ==
In 2009, Bixler-Zavala married actress and model Chrissie Carnell. The couple reside in Los Angeles, California. They had their first children, twin boys Ulysses and Xanthus, in 2013. In November 2017, he said in a pair of tweets that actor Danny Masterson had sexually assaulted his wife, and that he wrote At the Drive-In's song "Incurably Innocent" about the alleged incident.

Bixler-Zavala is a former member of the Church of Scientology and had credited Scientology with his changed attitude on the use of drugs. He attended the Church of Scientology Celebrity Centre event in 2013. In 2015, Bixler-Zavala spoke about his decision to stop smoking marijuana. "I was spending $1,000 a week on weed", he said, and rationalized his use by believing it made him more creative, when he later came to realize "I was using it to form this stoned bubble that helped me justify not wanting to interact with people." However, by 2017 he had become a harsh critic of Scientology, calling its "self help volcano[...] as barren as a floating needle. A placebo of Sugary kool aid" and accusing it of silencing sexual assault victims and of harassing both him and his wife; in 2018, he accused it of covering up his wife's alleged sexual assault and called it "a modern-day version of The Handmaid's Tale".

In 2020, Bixler-Zavala's dog died after allegedly eating raw meat laced with rat poison that had been tossed into their yard. Bixler-Zavala alleged that the Church of Scientology was responsible, though they have denied the accusations.

Bixler-Zavala's life has been heavily impacted by the deaths of people who have been in close association with him, several of which have become themes for his lyrics. Jimmy Hernandez, bass player for Los Dregtones, died of cancer in 1994. The year after, the original drummer for At the Drive-In, Bernie Rincon, died by suicide. In 1996, a close friend and band-mate of Bixler-Zavala's, Los Dregtones bassist Julio Venegas, also died by suicide. The story behind the Mars Volta's first album De-Loused in the Comatorium was loosely inspired by the "life and death of Julio Venegas". During the following year, two of his bandmates of the group The Fall on Deaf Ears, Laura Beard and Sarah Reiser, died in a car accident. In May 2003, their sound manipulator and longtime friend of Bixler-Zavala and Omar Rodríguez-López, Jeremy Ward, was found dead of an apparent heroin overdose. In October 2014, Isaiah "Ikey" Owens, former bandmate and keyboardist for Bixler-Zavala's previous bands De Facto and the Mars Volta (the latter from 2001 to 2010), was found dead in Puebla, Mexico, while on tour with Jack White. Owens was 39 years old and his cause of death was later confirmed to be a heart attack.

Bixler-Zavala praised his former Foss bandmate Beto O'Rourke after O'Rourke lost the 2018 United States Senate election in Texas to Ted Cruz, expressing hope that O'Rourke would run for president in the future. During the 2020 Democratic Party presidential primaries, Bixler-Zavala endorsed Bernie Sanders and criticized O'Rourke's endorsement of Joe Biden after O'Rourke suspended his own campaign.

== Discography ==
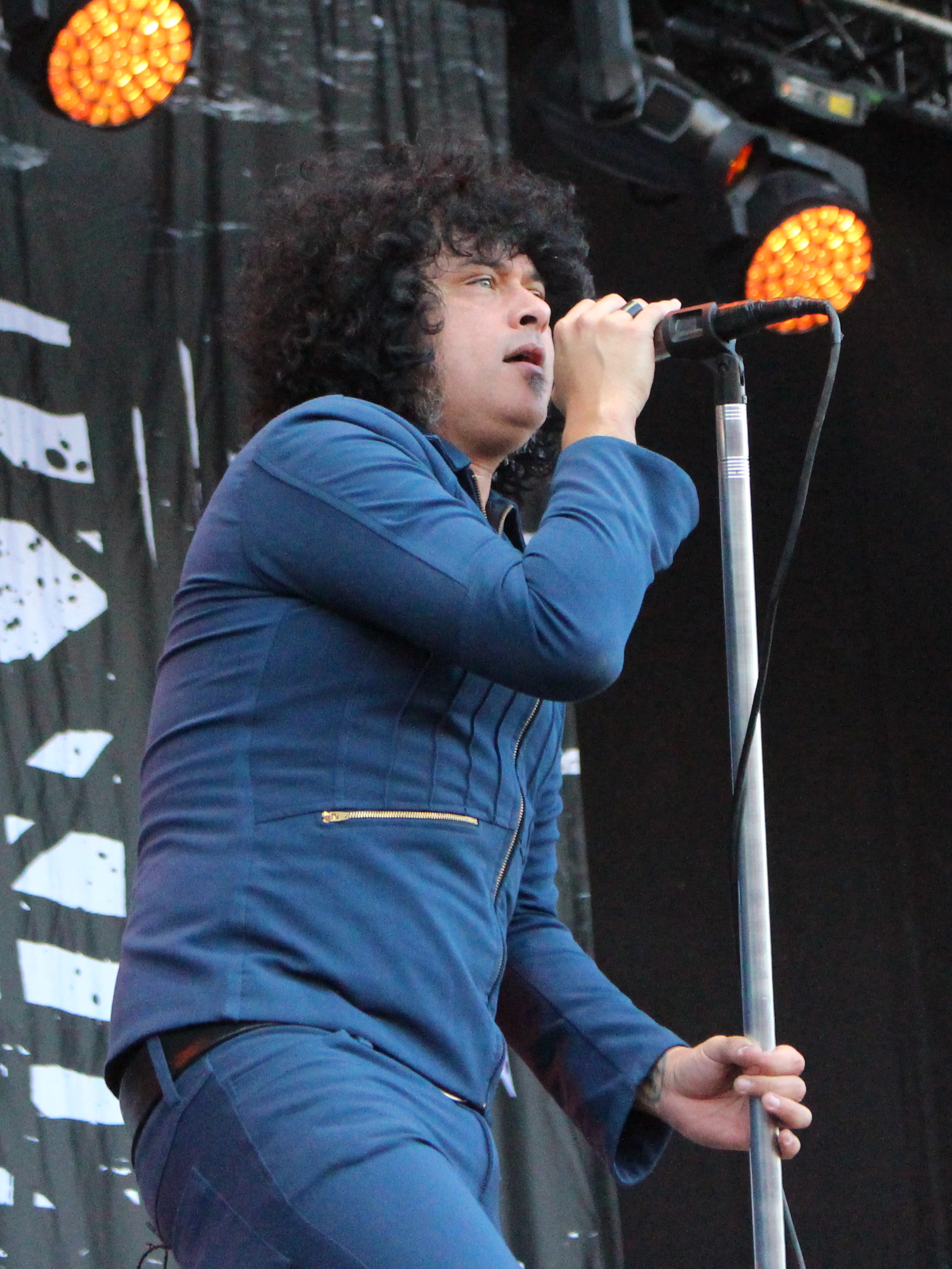
Bixler-Zavala with At the Drive-In in 2017

=== As Alavaz Relxib Cirdec ===
- The Special 12 Singles Series – "Live Private Booths" / "Sapta Loka" single (2005)

=== With Antemasque ===
- Antemasque – LP (2014)
- Saddle on the Atom Bomb – LP (unreleased)

=== With Anywhere ===
- Anywhere – LP (2012)
- Light The Portals – LP (2016)
- Anywhere II – LP (2018)

=== With At the Drive-In ===
- Hell Paso (1994) – re-release – EP
- Alfaro Vive, Carajo! (1995) – EP
- Acrobatic Tenement (1996, re-release 2004) – LP
- El Gran Orgo (1997) – EP
- In/Casino/Out (1998, re-release 2004) – LP
- Vaya (1999, re-release 2004) – EP
- Sunshine / At the Drive-In (2000) – EP
- Relationship of Command (2000, re-release 2004) – LP
- This Station Is Non-Operational (2005) – compilation
- in•ter a•li•a (2017) – LP
- Diamanté (2017) – EP

=== With Big Sir ===
- Before Gardens After Gardens – LP (2012)

=== With De Facto ===
- De Facto – EP (1999)
- How Do You Dub? You Fight For Dub, You Plug Dub In – LP (2001)
- 456132015 – EP (2001)
- Megaton Shotblast – LP (2001)
- Légende du Scorpion à Quatre Queues – LP (2001)

=== With The Fall on Deaf Ears ===
- The Fall on Deaf Ears – EP (1996)

=== With Foss ===
- The El Paso Pussycats (1993) – 7-inch
- Foss (1993)
- Fewel St. (1994)

=== With Thee Gambede Meatleak ===
- The Crab, The Bear, The Tiger, The Moose, The Bird (1995)

=== With Los Dregtones ===
- 5 Song Alibi (1994)

=== With The Mars Volta ===
- Tremulant – EP (2002)
- De-Loused in the Comatorium – LP (2003)
- Live – EP (2003)
- Frances the Mute – LP (2005)
- Scabdates – LP (2005)
- Amputechture – LP (2006)
- The Bedlam in Goliath – LP (2008)
- Octahedron – LP (2009)
- Noctourniquet – LP (2012)
- La Realidad De Los Sueños – box set (2021)
- Landscape Tantrums – LP (2021)
- The Mars Volta – LP (2022)
- Que Dios Te Maldiga Mi Corazón (2023)
- Lucro Sucio; Los Ojos del Vacío (2025)
- Lucro Sucio; Unfinished Business (2026)

=== With Omar Rodríguez-López ===
- A Manual Dexterity: Soundtrack Volume 1 (2004)
- Omar Rodriguez (2005)
- Se Dice Bisonte, No Búfalo (2007)
- Calibration (Is Pushing Luck and Key Too Far) (2007)
- Old Money (2008)
- Cryptomnesia (2009)
- Sympathy for Delicious OST – 3 tracks as 'Burnt the Dipthongs'
- Telesterion (2011)
- El Bien y Mal Nos Une (2016)
- Some Need It Lonely (2016)
- Solid State Mercenaries (2017)

=== With Steve Lyman ===
- SIGNAL TO BURNING (2026)
- SIGNAL TO BURNING (B-SIDES) (2026)

=== With RJs Prospectors ===
- TBA (2009)

=== With Zavalaz ===
- All Those Nights We Never Met - LP (unreleased)

=== Guest appearances ===
- Sand Which Is – Burn Right Through (2000) ("Plasticity Index")
- Various artists backed by the Rollins Band – Rise Above: 24 Black Flag Songs to Benefit the West Memphis Three (2002) ("I've Had It")
- Thavius Beck – Decomposition (2004) ("Amongst The Shadows")
- Handsome Boy Modeling School – White People (2004) ("A Day In The Life")
- Mastodon – Blood Mountain (2006) ("Siberian Divide")
- El-P – I'll Sleep When You're Dead (2007) ("Tasmanian Pain Coaster")
- El-P – Weareallgoingtoburninhellmegamixx2 / Eat My Garbage (2008) ("Tasmanian Pain Coaster (A Cappella)")
- Hechizo (Las Canciones De Bunbury Y Héroes Del Silencio Cantadas Por Los Artistas De Los Dos Lados Del Atlántico) (2010) ("Olvidado" and "Lady Blue")
- Oso – "Delorean" (2010)
- Nobody – Vivid Green (2013) ("Our Last Dance" and "Aways Away")
- Saul Williams – MartyrLoserKing (2016) ("Ashes")
- Lisa Papineau – Oh Dead On Oh Love (2019) ("Hey Lord Take Me Over")
- Fences – Failure Sculptures (2019) ("Brass Band")
- Jonny Polonsky – Kingdom Of Sleep (2020) ("Ghost Like Soul")

=== As producer ===
- Hell Paso by At the Drive-In (1994); co-produced with other members of At the Drive-In
- ¡Alfaro Vive, Carajo! by At the Drive-In (1995); co-produced with other members of At the Drive-In
- El Gran Orgo by At the Drive-In (1997); co-produced with Bryan Jones and other members of At the Drive-In
- Sunshine / At the Drive-In by At the Drive-In (2000); co-produced with other members of At the Drive-In
- Live by The Mars Volta (2003); co-produced with Omar Rodríguez-López

=== As artist ===
- Jeminism II by MIJA (2011)
