= Paul Hinojos =

American musician

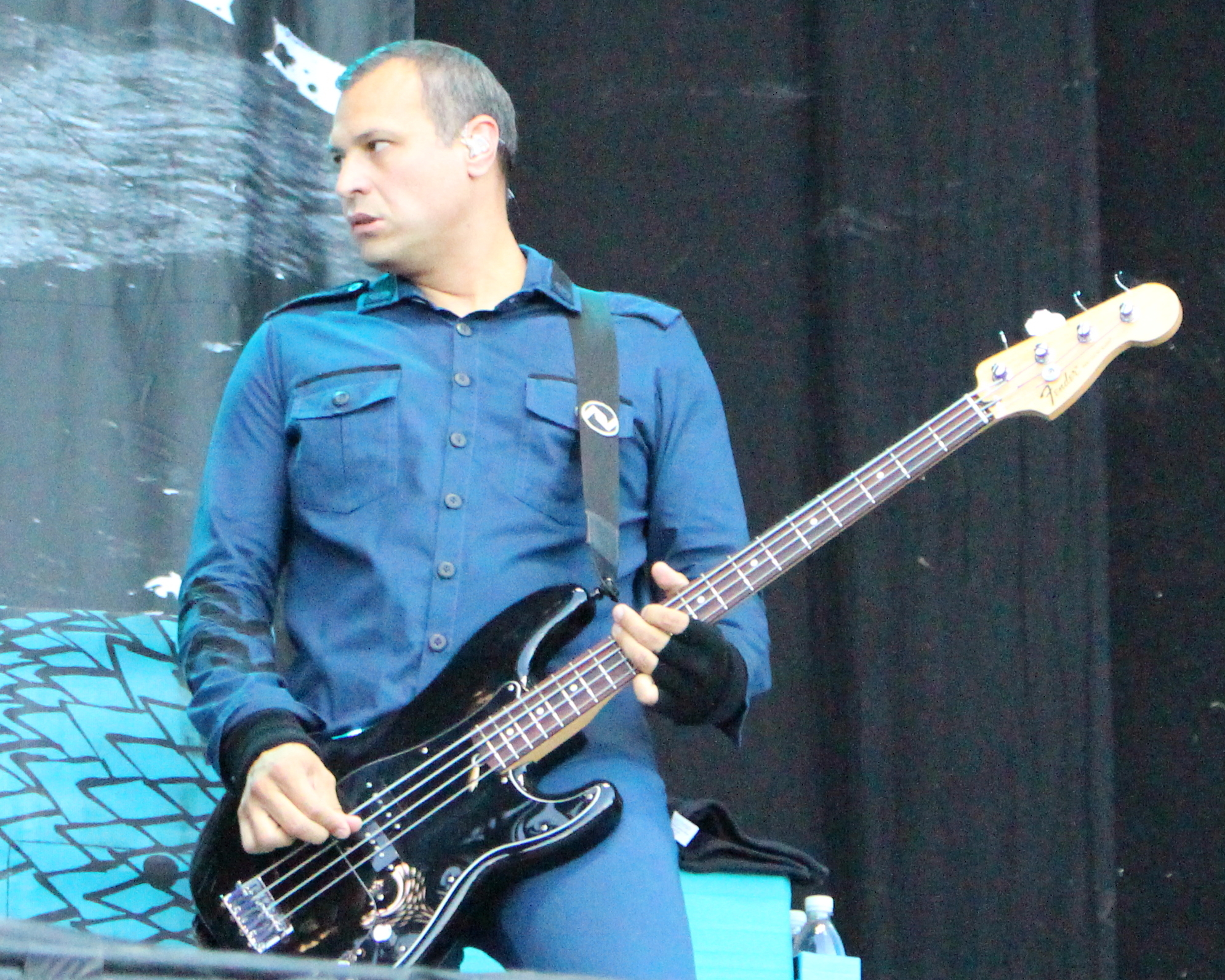
- Hinojos performing with At the Drive-In in 2017

Background information
- Born: Pablo J. Hinojos-Gonzalez; July 17, 1975 (age 51); Los Angeles, California, U.S.
- Origin: El Paso, Texas, U.S.
- Genres: Post-hardcore; progressive rock; experimental rock; alternative rock; psychedelic rock; art rock
- Occupation: Musician
- Instruments: Bass; guitar
- Years active: 1996–present

Pablo J. Hinojos-Gonzalez (born July 17, 1975), also known as Paul Hinojos, is an American musician best known as the bass guitarist for At the Drive-In, and former touring member of The Mars Volta. He is also a former guitarist of Sparta.

== Biography ==
Hinojos was born in Los Angeles. He met future bandmate Omar Rodríguez-López at the age of 13 in El Paso, Texas and apparently introduced Omar to another close friend and collaborator Cedric Bixler-Zavala. Rodriguez-Lopez and Bixler-Zavala would later ask him to join At the Drive-In after some significant member changes in 1996, making him a part of the band's most successful and well-known line up. After At the Drive-In took an indefinite hiatus in 2001, Hinojos, along with fellow ATDI members Jim Ward and Tony Hajjar, formed the band Sparta.

Hinojos left Sparta in 2005, quoted as saying, "My time with Sparta has run its course, and simply wasn't fun anymore." A few days later, it was announced that he had joined The Mars Volta, where he took up the role of second guitar in addition to 'sound manipulator' role (previously occupied by Jim Ward's cousin Jeremy). In February 2009 at the 51st annual Grammy Awards, Hinojos, along with fellow Mars Volta bandmates was awarded the Grammy for Best Hard Rock Performance for the song "Wax Simulacra", from the album "The Bedlam in Goliath". Hinojos left The Mars Volta later in 2009 after being asked by Rodriguez-Lopez, in order to strip the band's sound down for their album "Octahedron".

He was said to be beginning a solo project, Hour of the Monarchy, alongside John Frusciante in 2008, although the Negativa EP that was announced has yet to be released. Paul was next working along with other familiar collaborators Eric Salas, Ralph Jasso, and Gabriel Gonzalez as Dios Kilos in 2009. Gabriel was also involved with producing Negativa. They were said to be releasing an EP as well which remains unreleased. Hinojos also co-produced the film The Sentimental Engine Slayer with Mars Volta bandmates Omar Rodríguez-López and Juan Alderete.

More, recently, Hinojos has been working on a new project with Daniel Anderson (of Idiot Pilot), Mark Gajadhar and Cody Votolato (of The Blood Brothers), and rapper Hyro Da Hero. He collaborates further with Cody Votolato in Jaguar Love (Seattle, WA).

In January 2012, Hinojos reunited with his bandmates of At the Drive-In and played at Red7 in Austin, Texas, their first show in 11 years. Their first studio album in 17 years, in•ter a•li•a, was released on May 5, 2017 via Rise.

== Discography ==
=== With At the Drive-In ===
- El Gran Orgo (1997)
- In/Casino/Out (1998)
- Vaya (1999)
- Relationship of Command (2000)
- This Station Is Non-Operational (compilation, 2005)
- in•ter a•li•a (2017)
- Diamanté (2017)

=== With Sparta ===
- Austere (2002)
- Wiretap Scars (2002)
- Porcelain (2004)
- Live at La Zona Rosa 3.19.04 (2004)

=== With The Mars Volta ===
- Scabdates (2005)
- Amputechture (2006)
- The Bedlam in Goliath (2008)

=== With Look Daggers ===
- Suffer in Style – LP (2008)

=== With Hyro Da Hero ===
- Birth, School, Work, Death (2011)
