= Tony Hajjar =

Lebanese American drummer (born 1974)

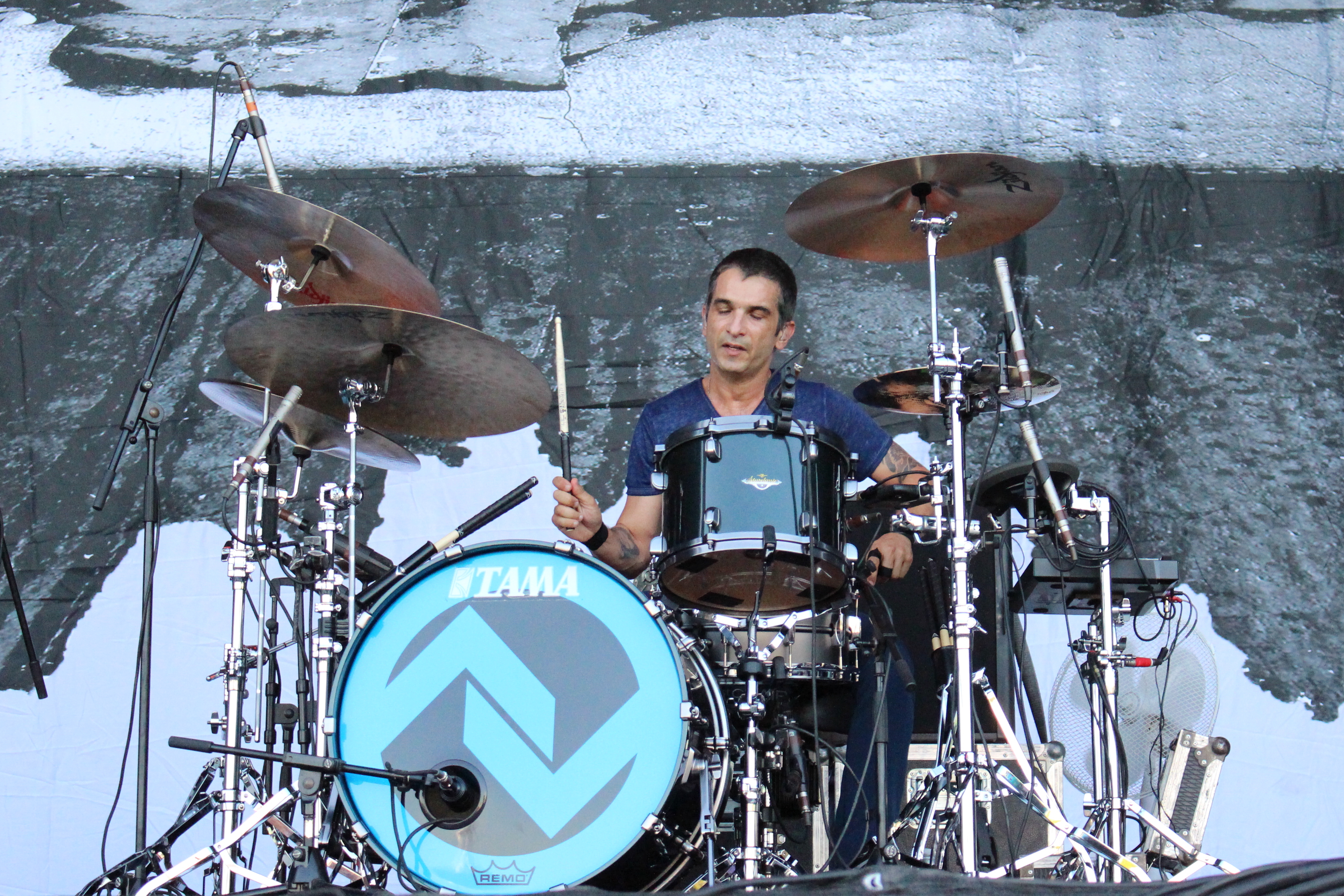
- Hajjar at the Frequency Festival 2017

Background information
- Born: 17 August 1974 (age 52); Beirut, Lebanon
- Origin: El Paso, Texas, U.S.
- Genres: Post-hardcore; alternative rock; electronica
- Occupation: Drummer
- Years active: 1996–present

Tony Hajjar (born August 17, 1974) is a Lebanese-born American drummer, best known for playing in At the Drive-In and Sparta. He is also a member of the supergroup Gone Is Gone.

== Biography ==
Hajjar was born in Beirut, Lebanon. His family fled Lebanon during the Civil War, moving to the United States and settling in El Paso, Texas. When Hajjar was fourteen his mother died from cancer and his father, who had been distant, left the family. His brother, only 18 years old at the time, assumed responsibility for the family and raised Tony and his sister.

Hajjar joined post-hardcore band At the Drive-In in 1996, becoming the band's fourth drummer. He remained with the band until they split up in 2001, and was a part of the band's subsequent reunions in 2012 and 2016-2018. During breaks from touring Hajjar taught chemistry. Following the demise of At the Drive-In Hajjar formed the band Sparta with fellow ATD-I members Paul Hinojos and Jim Ward. He also played on several other bands' recordings, including Jimmy Eat World's "Disintegration" on their Stay on My Side Tonight EP.

In 2006 Hajjar released a 16-minute short film entitled "Eme Nakia" (Arabic for Mother Nakia, Hajjar's mother's name) as part of a special edition of Sparta's album, Threes following Hajjar's early life story.

Hajjar has been a member of the experimental supergroup Gone Is Gone since 2016.

He performed on the track "Grey Area" for Puscifer's 2023 remix album, Existential Reckoning: Rewired.

Hajjar has been composing music since 2009, with his work appearing in hundreds of movie trailers. He also helped compose the 2013 action-adventure game Tom Clancy's Splinter Cell: Blacklist.

== Discography ==
=== With At the Drive-In ===
- El Gran Orgo (1997)
- In/Casino/Out (1998)
- Vaya (1999)
- Relationship of Command (2000)
- This Station Is Non-Operational (compilation, 2005)
- in•ter a•li•a (2017)
- Diamanté (2017)

=== With Giant Prophet ===
- Curio (1996)

=== With Gone Is Gone ===
- Gone Is Gone (2016)
- Echolocation (2017)
- If Everything Happens for a Reason... Then Nothing Really Matters at All (2020)

=== With Nakia ===
- Nakia (2004)

=== With New Language ===
- Come Alive (2017)

=== With Sparta ===
- Austere (2002)
- Wiretap Scars (2002)
- Live at La Zona Rosa 3.19.04 (2004)
- Porcelain (2004)
- Threes (2006)

=== With Tü Edge ===
- Tü Edge (unreleased)

=== Guest appearances ===
- 2Mex – Selections From 'Sweat Lodge Infinite' (2003)
- Jimmy Eat World – Stay On My Side Tonight (2005)
- Puscifer – Existential Reckoning: Rewired (2023)
- Liquid Death – Greatest Hates Vol. 3 (2023)

Soundtrack

- Splinter Cell Blacklist (Original Game Soundtrack) (2013)
