= Relationship of Command =

Studio album by At the Drive-In
- Released: September 12, 2000
- Recorded: January–March 2000
- Studio: Indigo Ranch Studios (Malibu, California)
- Genre: Post-hardcore
- Length: 45:24
- Labels: Grand Royal; Fearless; Virgin
- Producer: Ross Robinson

At the Drive-In chronology
Sunshine / At the Drive-In (2000)	Relationship of Command (2000)	This Station Is Non-Operational (2005)

Singles from Relationship of Command
- 1. "One Armed Scissor" Released: August 7, 2000; 2. "Rolodex Propaganda" Released: December 4, 2000; 3. "Invalid Litter Dept." Released: March 12, 2001

Relationship of Command is the third studio album by the American post-hardcore band At the Drive-In, released on September 12, 2000. The album combines an aggressive edge with a melodic drive, emotive vocals, and surreal lyrics. Initially received positively by critics, the album is now seen not only as one of the most influential post-hardcore albums of the 2000s, but also as one of the most accomplished recent works in the wider rock spectrum. Relationship of Command was voted twelfth out of 100 in the Albums of the Decade by NME, and the 37th most influential album of all time by Kerrang!. It is the band's final album to feature founding member Jim Ward.

== Background and recording ==
Relationship of Command was recorded over a seven-week period starting on January 17, 2000, following a tour supporting Rage Against the Machine. The album was recorded at the Indigo Ranch Studios, in Malibu, California, and was produced by Ross Robinson and mixed by Andy Wallace.

Known for his unorthodox production methods, Robinson at one point took bass player Paul Hinojos for a drive in his SUV through the hills of Malibu to get his adrenaline going prior to recording.

Each song on the album was first tracked live, due to Robinson wanting to capture the energy the band had onstage, with some overdubs added afterwards.

Iggy Pop sings on "Rolodex Propaganda" and appears on the spoken word intro to "Enfilade." According to guitarist Omar Rodríguez-López, Robinson "had been talking to Iggy because they were gonna work together. I don't know if they ever did, but they'd sort of been chatting, so Ross had passed him our previous records and he liked them. So, of course I brought up the idea."

While most of the album was written over the course of six-week long pre-production sessions, the tracks "Enfilade" and "Non-Zero Possibility" were both written in the studio.

The album's cover artwork (including the covers for the singles "One Armed Scissor," "Invalid Litter Dept." and "Rolodex Propaganda"), illustrated by Damon Locks, all revolve around imagery of the Trojan War, and the Trojan Horse in particular.

In 2010, Rodriguez stated that he felt the album was “ruined by the mix”, calling it “plastic”, and said he did not feel it captured the band’s true energy.

== Release ==
In March 2000, the band embarked on a five-week tour of Europe, two of which were spent with Sunshine. Following this, the band played a few shows in Japan in May, with Eastern Youth. They returned to the US, in time for a July tour. "One Armed Scissor" was released as a single in August 2000. Relationship of Command was released on September 12, 2000. In March 2001, the band went on indefinite hiatus.

== Reception ==
=== Critical reception ===
Professional ratings
Aggregate scores
Source	Rating
Metacritic	77/100
Review scores
Source	Rating
AllMusic	4/5 stars
Entertainment Weekly	A
The Guardian	3/5 stars
Melody Maker	4/5 stars
Metal Hammer	10/10
NME	9/10
Pitchfork	6.1/10 (2004); 8.3/10 (2013)
Q	4/5 stars
Rolling Stone	3/5 stars
Uncut	5/5 stars
The Village Voice	A−

The album initially received generally positive reviews, with Metacritic giving the album an aggregate score of 77. The album is now seen as one of the most influential rock albums of the decade, with it being ranked 47th in the 50 Greatest Albums of the 21st century in Kerrang!, number 83 on Spin magazine's 100 Greatest Albums 1985–2005, 6th in State magazine's 100 albums of the decade, 3rd in JustPressPlay's Top 100 Albums of the 2000s, 52nd in Decibel magazine's Greatest 100 albums of the decade, 117th in Uncut magazine's 150 Albums of the decade, as well as being ranked at number 90 on MTV2's greatest albums ever list. A retrospective BBC music review hailed the significance of Relationship of Command's uniqueness, calling the album "mesmerising" and a "statement of grand intent that could never be followed."

In 2005, the album was ranked number 423 in Rock Hard magazine's book The 500 Greatest Rock & Metal Albums of All Time. The album is also seen as an influential guitar album, being ranked number 94 in a Guitar World reader's poll of the 100 greatest guitar albums of all time. This list appeared in the October 2006 issue of Guitar World.

=== Legacy ===
Following the release of the album, At the Drive-In gained brief mainstream critical and commercial success, with Relationship of Command appearing in end-of-year lists of the best albums of 2000 by publications such as the Los Angeles Times and Rolling Stone, as well as becoming their first album to reach the Billboard 200. The band also made appearances on shows such as Late Night with Conan O'Brien and the Late Show with David Letterman. However, despite this success, the band went on an indefinite hiatus in 2001, with the members splitting to form The Mars Volta and Sparta.

The album was included in Rock Sound's 101 Modern Classics list at number 4. The album was ranked at number 177 on Spin's "The 300 Best Albums of the Past 30 Years (1985–2014)" list. In 2019, the album was ranked 42nd on The Guardian's 100 Best Albums of the 21st Century list. In 2020, it was named one of the 20 best metal albums of 2000 by Metal Hammer magazine. Journalists Leslie Simon and Trevor Kelley included the album in their list of the most essential emo releases in their book Everybody Hurts: An Essential Guide to Emo Culture (2007). Alternative Press ranked "One Armed Scissor" at number one on their list of the best 100 singles from the 2000s.

== Track listing ==
All lyrics are written by Cedric Bixler-Zavala and Omar Rodríguez-López; all music is composed by At the Drive-In

No.	Title	Length
1.	"Arcarsenal"	2:55
2.	"Pattern Against User"	3:17
3.	"One Armed Scissor"	4:19
4.	"Sleepwalk Capsules"	3:27
5.	"Invalid Litter Dept."	6:05
6.	"Mannequin Republic"	3:02
7.	"Enfilade"	5:01
8.	"Rolodex Propaganda"	2:55
9.	"Quarantined"	5:24
10.	"Cosmonaut"	3:23
11.	"Non-Zero Possibility"	5:36
Total length:		45:24

Japanese and re-release bonus tracks
No.	Title	Length
12.	"Extracurricular"	3:59
13.	"Catacombs" (re-recording; original version appeared on a Thick Records split 7-inch with Burning Airlines' The Deluxe War Baby, and Plea For Peace/Take Action Vol 1.)	4:14
Total length:		8:13 53:37

2012 Australian reissue bonus disc (2001 Triple J Live at the Wireless session)
No.	Title	Length
1.	"Arcarsenal"	3:49
2.	"Quarantined"	9:51
3.	"One-Armed Scissor"	3:59
Total length:		17:39

== Personnel ==
At the Drive-In

- Cedric Bixler-Zavala – lead vocals, guitar on "Arcarsenal" and "Rolodex Propaganda", melodica on "Enfilade", percussion
- Jim Ward – guitar, vocals, keyboards
- Omar Rodríguez-López – guitar, backing vocals
- Paul Hinojos – bass guitar
- Tony Hajjar – drums, percussion

Other musicians

- Iggy Pop – guest vocals on "Rolodex Propaganda" and "Enfilade"

Technical personnel

- Ross Robinson – producer
- Chuck Johnson – engineer
- Zak Girdis – assistant engineer
- Kevin Bosley – assistant engineer
- Andy Wallace – mixing
- Eddy Schreyer – mastering
- Damon Locks – illustrations
- Jason Farrell – layout design

== Charts ==
Chart (2000)	Peak position
Australian Albums Chart	25
UK Albums Chart (OCC)	33
US Billboard 200	116
US Heatseekers Albums (Billboard)	1

== Certifications ==
Region	Certification	Certified units/sales
Australia (ARIA)	Gold	35,000^{^}
United Kingdom (BPI)	Gold	100,000^{^}
^{^} Shipments figures based on certification alone.
