= Foss =

Foss or FOSS may refer to:

== Acronyms ==
- Forum of Small States (FOSS), grouping of countries at the United Nations
- Free and open-source software (FOSS)
  - FOSS movement in India (1990s–2000s), a campaign in India to promote Free and Open Source Software
    - FOSS.IN (2001–2012), an annual FOSS conference in Bangalore, India
- Full-Option Science System (FOSS), a science curriculum

== Companies ==
- Foss A/S, a Danish analytical instrument company
- Foss Brewery, a former brewery in Oslo, Norway
- Foss Maritime, an American tugboat and shipping company
- Foss Slipeskivefabrikk, a former industrial company in Fet, Norway

== Historic houses ==
Each in the United States

- Horatio G. Foss House, Auburn, Maine
- Foss House (New Brighton, Minnesota)
- Foss and Wells House, Jordan, Minnesota
- Levi Foss House, Goodwins Mills, Maine

== People ==
=== Surname ===
- Foss (surname), includes a list of notable people with the surname

=== Given name ===
- Foss O. Eldred (1884–1956), American educator and politician in Michigan
- Foss Leach (born 1942), New Zealand archaeologist
- Foss Shanahan (1910–1964), New Zealand diplomat
- Foss Westcott (1863–1949), English bishop

=== Fictional characters ===
- Foss Gly, a character from the Clive Cussler novels Night Probe! and Cyclops

== Places ==
=== United Kingdom ===
- Foss Dyke, a canal in Lincolnshire, England
- River Foss, a river in North Yorkshire, England

=== United States ===
- Foss, Oklahoma, a town
  - Foss State Park
- Foss, Oregon, an unincorporated community
- Foss Glacier, a glacier on Mount Hinman, Washington
- Foss Peak, Tatoosh Range, Washington
- Foss River, a river in Washington

=== Elsewhere ===
- Foss-Eikeland, a village in Sandnes, Norway

== Other uses ==
- Foss, another term for a waterfall
- Foss (band), an El Paso, Texas-based rock band
- Foss (cat), the pet of Edward Lear
- Il-Foss, a football ground in Ħaż-Żabbar, Malta
- USS Foss (DE-59), a US Navy ship

== See also ==
- Fosse (disambiguation)
- Fosses (disambiguation)
