= Foss House =

Foss House may refer to:

Each in the United States

- Horatio G. Foss House, Auburn, Maine
- Foss and Wells House, Jordan, Minnesota
- Foss House (New Brighton, Minnesota)
- Levi Foss House, Goodwins Mills, Maine

== See also ==
- Foss (disambiguation)
