= Foss (surname) =

Foss is a surname of Scandinavian origin. Foss may refer to:

- Aage Foss (1885–1952), Danish film actor
- Ambrose Foss (c. 1803–1862), Australian pharmacist
- Anders Foss (c. 1543–1607), Norwegian clergyman and Bishop of Bergen
- Anita Foss (1921–2015), American baseball player
- Austin Foss, American politician
- Betty Foss (1929–1998), American baseball player
- Brian Foss (psychologist) (1921–1997), British psychologist
- Brian Foss (art historian), Canadian art historian, academic, curator and writer
- Byron Foss (born 1979), American soccer player
- Charles Calveley Foss (1885–1953), English recipient of the Victoria Cross
- Chris Foss (born 1946), British illustrator
- Christopher F Foss (born 1946), British historian and writer
- Cornelia Foss, American artist and teacher
- Craig Foss (born 1963), New Zealand politician
- Cyrus David Foss (1834–1910), American Methodist bishop
- Daniel Foss (1940–2014), American sociologist
- Darrell Foss (1892–1962), American film actor
- Dick Foss (1912–1995), English footballer
- Dickie Foss (1912–1995), English footballer
- Donald Foss (1945–2022), American billionaire, founder of Credit Acceptance
- Edward Foss (1787–1870), English lawyer and biographer
- Eliphalet J. Foss, American photographer
- Elith Foss (1911–1972), Danish film actor
- Erling Foss (1897–1982), Danish civil engineer
- Erik Foss (born 1954), Norwegian footballer and manager
- Erik Foss (artist) (born 1973), American artist and curator
- Eugene Foss (1858–1939), American politician
- Fanya Foss (1906–1995), Russian-born American screenwriter, short story writer and television writer
- Frank Foss (disambiguation), multiple people
- George Foss (disambiguation), several people
- Hans Andersen Foss (1851–1929), American author, newspaper editor and temperance leader
- Harold B. Foss (1910–1988), American architect
- Harriet Campbell Foss (1860–1938), American painter
- Heidi Foss, Canadian television writer
- Henrich Herman Foss (1790–1853), Norwegian naval officer and politician
- Henry Foss (1891–1986), American civic leader
- Herbert L. Foss (1871–1937), American naval seaman and Medal of Honor recipient
- Hubert J. Foss (1899–1953), English music publisher, pianist and composer
- Hugh Foss (1902–1971), British cryptographer
- Hugh Foss (bishop) (1848–1932), Anglican bishop
- Ingunn Foss, Norwegian politician
- Jan Foss (1938–2021), Norwegian sport shooter
- Jeff Foss (born 1988), American ice hockey defenseman
- Joe Foss (1915–2003), American general and politician
- John W. Foss (1933–2020), American general
- Josephine Foss, Anglican missionary teacher and welfare worker
- Judith Foss, American politician
- Julius Foss (1879–1953), Danish composer and musician
- Karen Foss (born 1944), American television journalist
- Karen A. Foss, American academic
- Kendall Foss, American journalist and writer
- Kenelm Foss (1885–1963), British actor, screenwriter and film director
- Kurt Foss (1925–1991), Norwegian composer, singer and vaudeville artist
- Larry Foss (1936–2019), American baseball pitcher
- Lee Foss, American record producer and DJ
- Leif O. Foss (1899–1982), Norwegian trade unionist and politician
- Lily Foss, American politician
- Lukas Foss (1922–2009), American composer and conductor
- Martin Foss (1889–1968), German-born American philosopher, father of Lukas
- Mel Foss (1939–2022), Canadian football player
- Nicolai J. Foss, Danish economist
- Nils Foss (1928–2018), Danish director and civil engineer
- Per-Kristian Foss (born 1950), Norwegian politician
- Peter Foss (born 1946), Australian politician
- Phillip O. Foss (1916–2001), American political scientist
- Richard Foss, American journalist and science fiction author
- Rodney Shelton Foss (1919–1941), American naval officer
- Sam Walter Foss (1858–1911), American librarian and poet
- Sander Moen Foss (born 1998), Norwegian footballer
- Sebastian Foss-Solevåg (born 1991), Norwegian alpine ski racer
- Sonja K. Foss American rhetorical scholar and educator
- Thea Foss (1857–1927), Norwegian-American businessperson
- Thore Torkildsen Foss (1841–1913), Norwegian politician
- Tobias Foss (born 1997), Norwegian cyclist
- Tore Foss (1901–1968), Norwegian actor
- Wenche Foss (1917–2011), Norwegian actress
- Wilbur Foss (1921–2015), American politician and fiddler

== See also ==
- Foss (disambiguation)
- Fosse (disambiguation)
- Voss (surname)
- Vos (surname)
