= Foss Slipeskivefabrikk =

Former Norwegian grinding wheel maker

- Formerly: Foss Smergelskivefabrikk
- Type: Aksjeselskap
- Industry: Manufacturing
- Founded: 1898
- Founder: Anton and Kristian Foss
- Defunct: 1992
- Fate: Acquired by Flexovit (1989); closed
- Headquarters: Fet, Akershus, Norway
- Products: Grinding wheels

Foss Slipeskivefabrikk (Norwegian for "Foss Grinding Wheel Factory") was an industrial company in Fet, Norway, established in 1898 by the brothers Anton and Kristian Foss at Gansdalen. Originally named Foss Smergelskivefabrikk, it specialized in grinding wheels, which were in particular demand at Norwegian sawmills, and exported to countries including Poland, Canada, and Russia. The brothers had earlier been in the United States, where Anton Foss had founded a grinding wheel company near Seattle. In 1911 they also established Fet Jernvarefabrikk, which was later moved to Grorud and became Grorud Jernvarefabrikk.

During World War II, the factory targeted by a sabotage attack on 7 August 1944 by the communist resistance group led by Ragnar Sollie ("Pelle"), one of whose members was killed when a charge detonated prematurely; the factory itself suffered only minor damage. In 1986 Foss bought its competitor Den Norske Slipeskivefabrik in Oslo, becoming Norway's only producer of grinding products, but in 1989 it was acquired by the larger Dutch competitor Flexovit, for which it had previously been an agent in Norway, and the Fet factory was closed in 1992.
