= Fosse =

Fosse, a ditch or moat, may also refer to:

== Places ==
- Fossé, Ardennes, a commune in France
- Fosse, Belgium, a district of the municipality of Trois-Ponts, Wallonia
- Fossé, Loir-et-Cher, a commune in central France
- Fosse, Pyrénées-Orientales, a town in France
- Fosse Copse, a woodland in Devon, England
- Fosse Farmhouse, an 18th-century farmhouse in the Cotswolds, UK
- Fosse Shopping Park, an out of town shopping centre in Leicestershire
- Fosse Way, a Roman road in England
- Fösse, a river of Lower Saxony, Germany

== People ==
- Bob Fosse (1927–1987), American musical theater choreographer
- Erik Fosse (born 1950), Norwegian physician and musician.
- Jon Fosse (born 1959), Norwegian writer
- Nicole Fosse (born 1963), American actress, dancer and producer
- Ray Fosse (1947–2021), American baseball player
- William Fosse (fl.1407–1411), English lawyer and politician

== Other uses ==
- Fosse (musical), a 1999 Broadway revue based on the choreography of Bob Fosse
- Fosse Awards, a former name of the American Choreography Awards
- Leicester Fosse, a former name of English football club Leicester City

== See also ==
- La Grande-Fosse, Vosges, France
- La Petite-Fosse, Vosges, France
- De la Fosse (disambiguation)
- Foss (disambiguation)
- Fossa (disambiguation)
- Fosses (disambiguation)
- Fossey (disambiguation)
