= Fossorial =

Animal adapted to digging and living underground

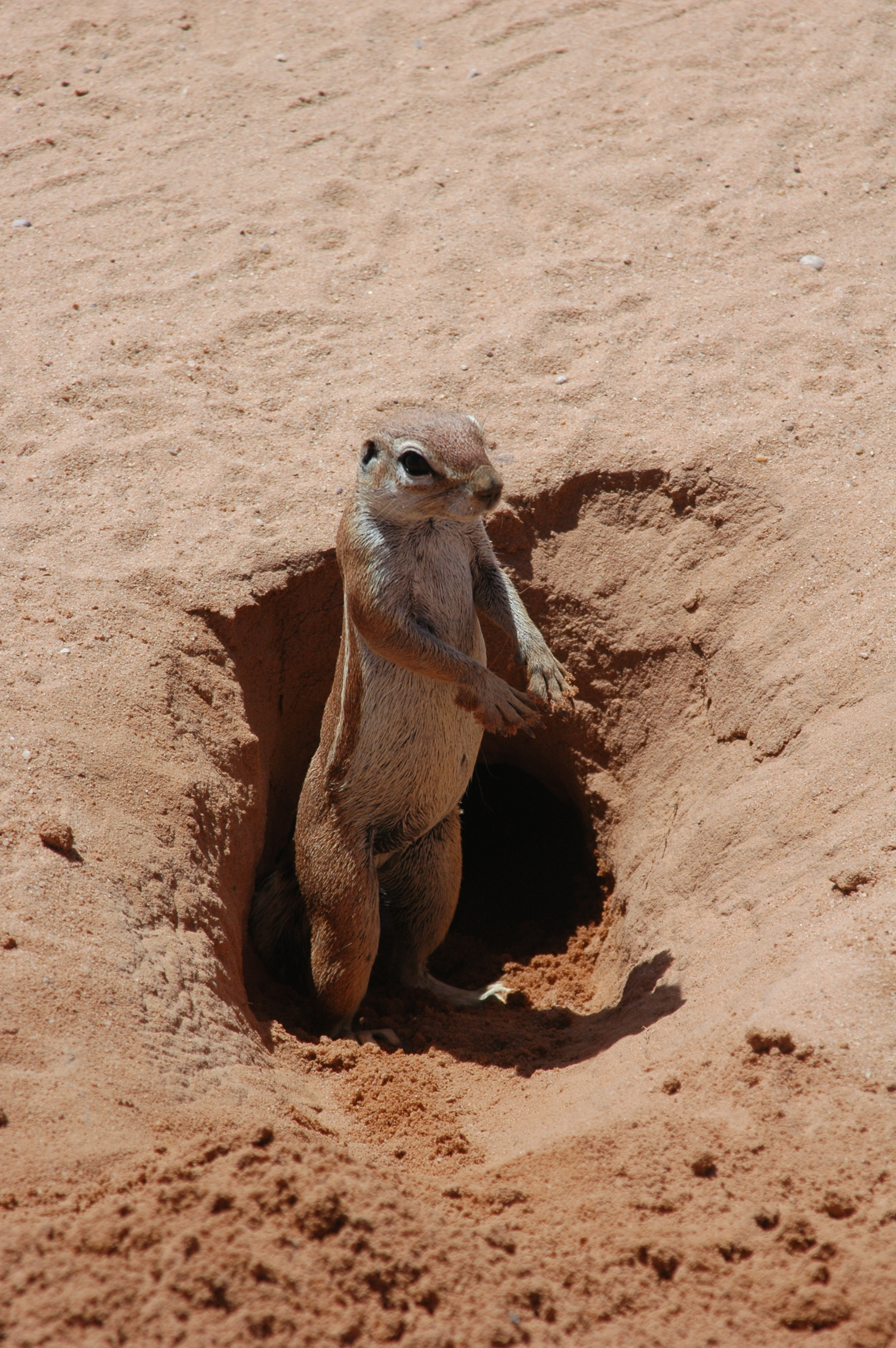
Cape ground squirrel

A fossorial animal (from Latin fossor 'digger') is one that is adapted to digging and which lives primarily (but not solely) underground. Examples of fossorial vertebrates are moles, badgers, naked mole-rats, meerkats, armadillos, wombats, and mole salamanders. Among invertebrates, many molluscs (e.g., clams), insects (e.g., beetles, wasps, bees), and arachnids (e.g. spiders) are fossorial.

== Prehistoric evidence ==
The physical adaptation of fossoriality is widely accepted as being widespread among many prehistoric phyla and taxa, such as bacteria and early eukaryotes. Furthermore, fossoriality has evolved independently multiple times, even within a single family. Fossorial animals appeared simultaneously with the colonization of land by arthropods in the late Ordovician period (over 440 million years ago). Other notable early burrowers include Eocaecilia and possibly Dinilysia. The oldest example of burrowing in synapsids, the lineage which includes modern mammals and their ancestors, is a cynodont, Thrinaxodon liorhinus, found in the Karoo of South Africa, estimated to be 251 million years old. Evidence shows that this adaptation occurred due to dramatic mass extinctions in the Permian period.

== Physical adaptations in vertebrates ==
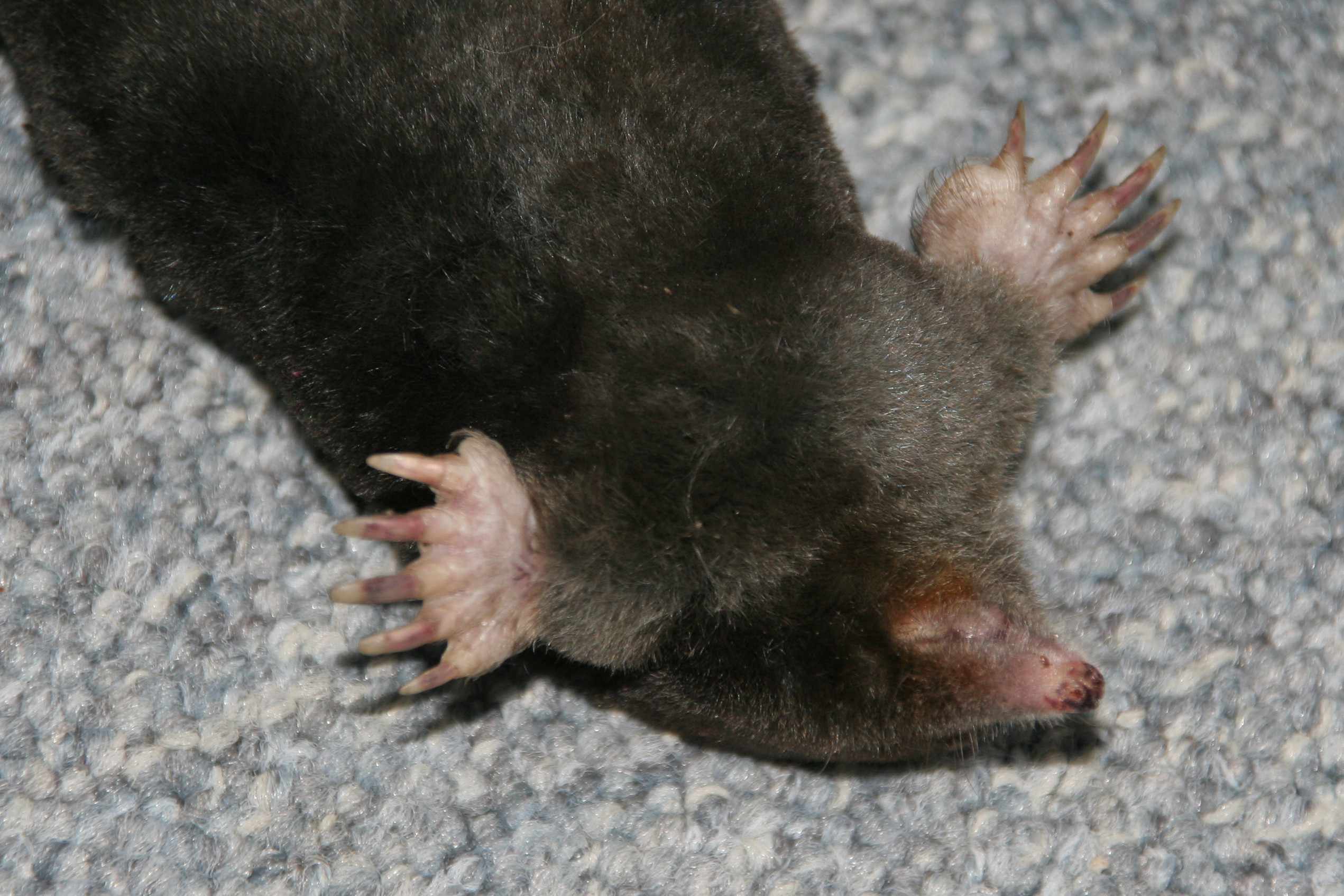
European mole; note the strong and short forelimbs

There are six major external modifications, as described by H. W. Shimer in 1903, that are shared in all mammalian burrowing species:

- Fusiform, a spindle-shaped body tapering at both ends, adapted for the dense subsurface environment.
- Lesser developed or missing eyesight, considering subsurface darkness.
- Small or missing external ears, to reduce naturally occurring friction during burrowing.
- Short and stout limbs, since swiftness or speed of movement is less important than the strength to dig.
- Broad and stout forelimbs (manus), including long claws, designed to loosen the burrowing material for the hind feet to disperse in the back. This trait is disputed by Jorge Cubo, who states that the skull is the main tool during excavation, but that the most active parts are the forelimbs for digging and that the hind-limbs are used for stability.
- Short or missing tail, which has little to no locomotor activity or burrowing use to most fossorial mammals.

Other important physical features include a subsurface adjusted skeleton: a triangularly shaped skull, a prenasal ossicle, chisel-shaped teeth, effectively fused and short lumbar vertebrae, well-developed sternum, strong forelimb and weaker hind limb bones. Due to the lack of light, one of the most important features of fossorial animals are the development of physical, sensory traits that allow them to communicate and navigate in the dark subsurface environment. Considering that sound travels slower in the air and faster through solid earth, the use of seismic (percussive) waves on a small scale is more advantageous in these environments. Several different uses are well documented. The Cape mole rat (Georychus capensis) uses drumming behavior to send messages to its kin through conspecific signaling. The Namib Desert golden mole (Eremitalpa granti namibensis) can detect termite colonies and similar prey underground due to the development of a hypertrophied malleus. This adaptation allows for better detection of low-frequency signals. The most likely explanation of the actual transmission of these seismic inputs, captured by the auditory system, is the use of bone conduction; whenever vibrations are applied to the skull, the signals travel through many routes to the inner ear.

For animals that burrow by compressing soil, the work required increases exponentially with body diameter. In amphisbaenians, an ancient group of burrowing lizard-like squamates, specializations include the pennation of the longissimus dorsi, the main muscle associated with burrowing, to increase muscle cross-sectional area. Constrained to small body diameters by the soil, amphisbaenians can increase muscle mass by increasing body length, not body diameter. In most amphisbaenians, limbs were lost as part of fossorial lifestyle. However the mole lizard Bipes, unlike other amphisbaenians, retains robust digging forelimbs comparable to those of moles and mole crickets.

== Physiological modifications ==
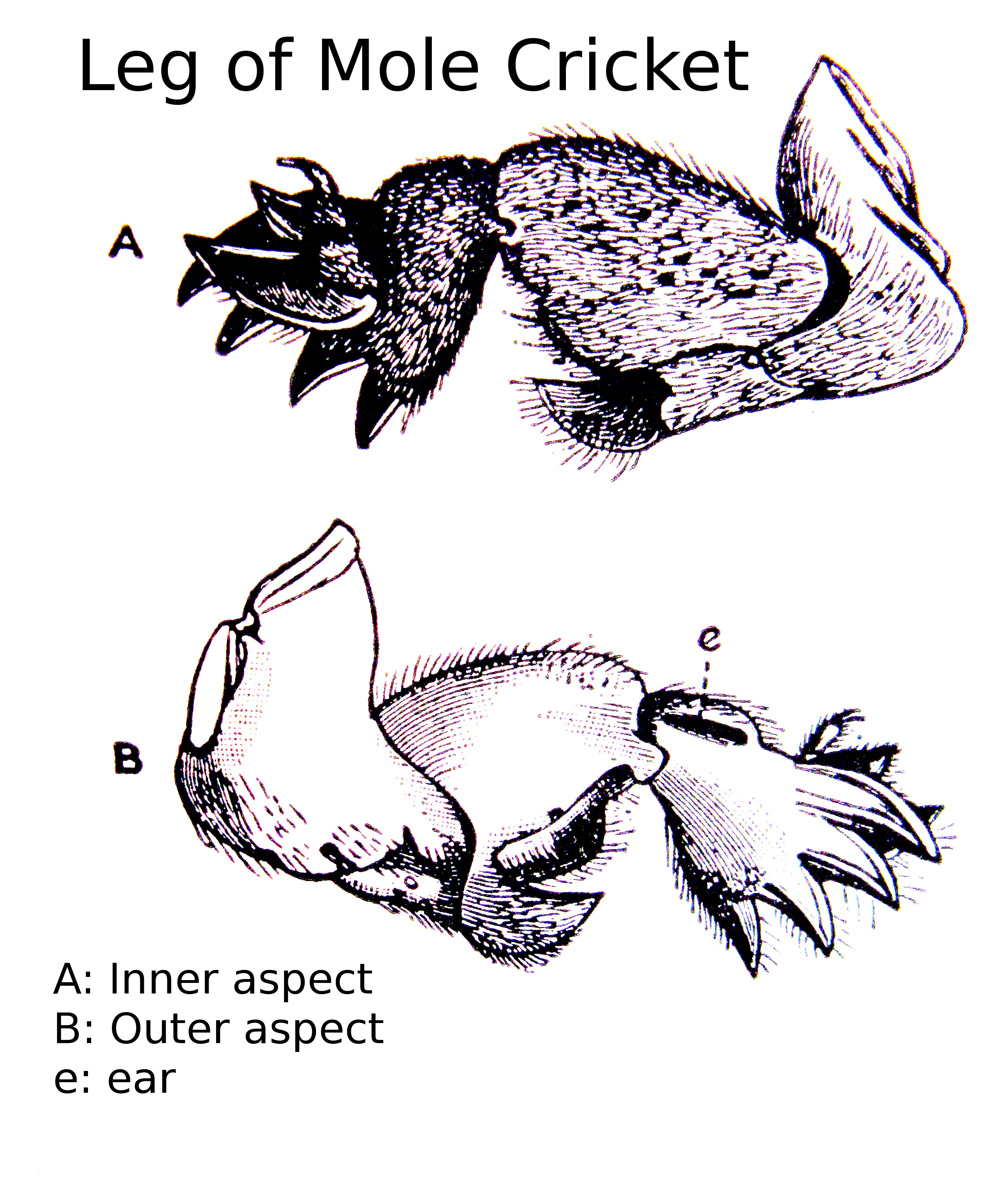
Fossorial front leg of mole cricket, showing auditory and fossorial adaptations

Many fossorial and sub-fossorial mammals that live in temperate zones with partially frozen grounds tend to hibernate due to the seasonal lack of soft, succulent herbage and other sources of nutrition.

W. H. Shimer concluded that, in general, species that adopted fossorial lifestyles likely did so because they failed, aboveground, to find food and protection from predators. Additionally, some, such as E. Nevo, propose that fossorial lifestyles could have occurred because aboveground climates were harsh. Shifts towards an underground lifestyle also entail changes in metabolism and energetics, often in a weight-dependent manner. Sub-fossorial species weighing more than 80 grams (2.8 oz) have comparably lower basal rates than those weighing lower than 60 grams (2.1 oz). The average fossorial animal has a basal rate between 60% and 90%. Further observations conclude that larger burrowing animals, such as hedgehogs or armadillos, have lower thermal conductance than smaller animals, most likely to reduce heat storage in their burrows.

Among some mammals, their adaptation for fossoriality can be determined through the fossoriality index. This involves measuring the length of the olecranon process by taking the distance between the posterior margin of the ulnar notch to the tip of the olecranon. This metric measures the magnitude of the mechanical advantage of the triceps muscle, with fossorial taxa tending to score highly on this index.

== Geological and ecological implications ==
One important impact on the environment caused by fossorial animals is bioturbation, defined by Marshall Wilkinson as the alteration of fundamental properties of the soil, including surface geomorphic processes. It is measured that small fossorials, such as ants, termites, and earthworms displace a massive amount of soil. The total global rates displaced by these animals are equivalent to the total global rates of tectonic uplift. The presence of burrowing animals also has a direct impact on the soil's composition, structure, and growing vegetation. The impact these animals have can range from feeding, harvesting, caching and soil disturbances, but can differ considering the large diversity of fossorial species – especially herbivorous species. The net effect is usually composed of an alteration of the composition of plant species and increased plant diversity, which can cause issues with standing crops, as the homogeneity of the crops is affected. Burrowing also impacts the nitrogen cycle in the affected soil. Mounds and bare soils that contain burrowing animals have considerably higher amounts of NH^{+}_{4} and NO^{−}_{3} as well as greater nitrification potential and microbial NO^{−}_{3} consumption than in vegetated soils. The primary mechanism for this occurrence is caused by the removal of the covering grassland.

Burrowing snakes may be more vulnerable to changing environments than non-burrowing snakes, although this may not be the case for other fossorial groups such as lizards. This may form an evolutionary dead end for snakes.

== See also ==
- Arboreal
- Burrow
- Cursorial
- Fossa
