= Fosses (disambiguation) =

Fosses is a commune in the Val-d'Oise department in Île-de-France in northern France.

Fosses may also refer to:

== Places ==
- Fosses-la-Ville, Namur, Belgium
- Nayemont-les-Fosses, Vosges, France
- Fosses-et-Baleyssac, south-western France

== See also ==
- Foss (disambiguation)
- Fosse (disambiguation)
- Fossa (disambiguation)
