= Fuoss =

Fuoss is a surname. Notable people with the surname include:

- Donald E. Fuoss (1923–2014), American basketball and football coach
- Paul Fuoss, American physicist
- Raymond Fuoss (1905–1987), American chemist
- Duane A Fuoss (1974- )

American musician Mount Pleasant PA.

== See also ==
- Foss (surname)
