= Linden-Limmer =

- Borough of Hanover
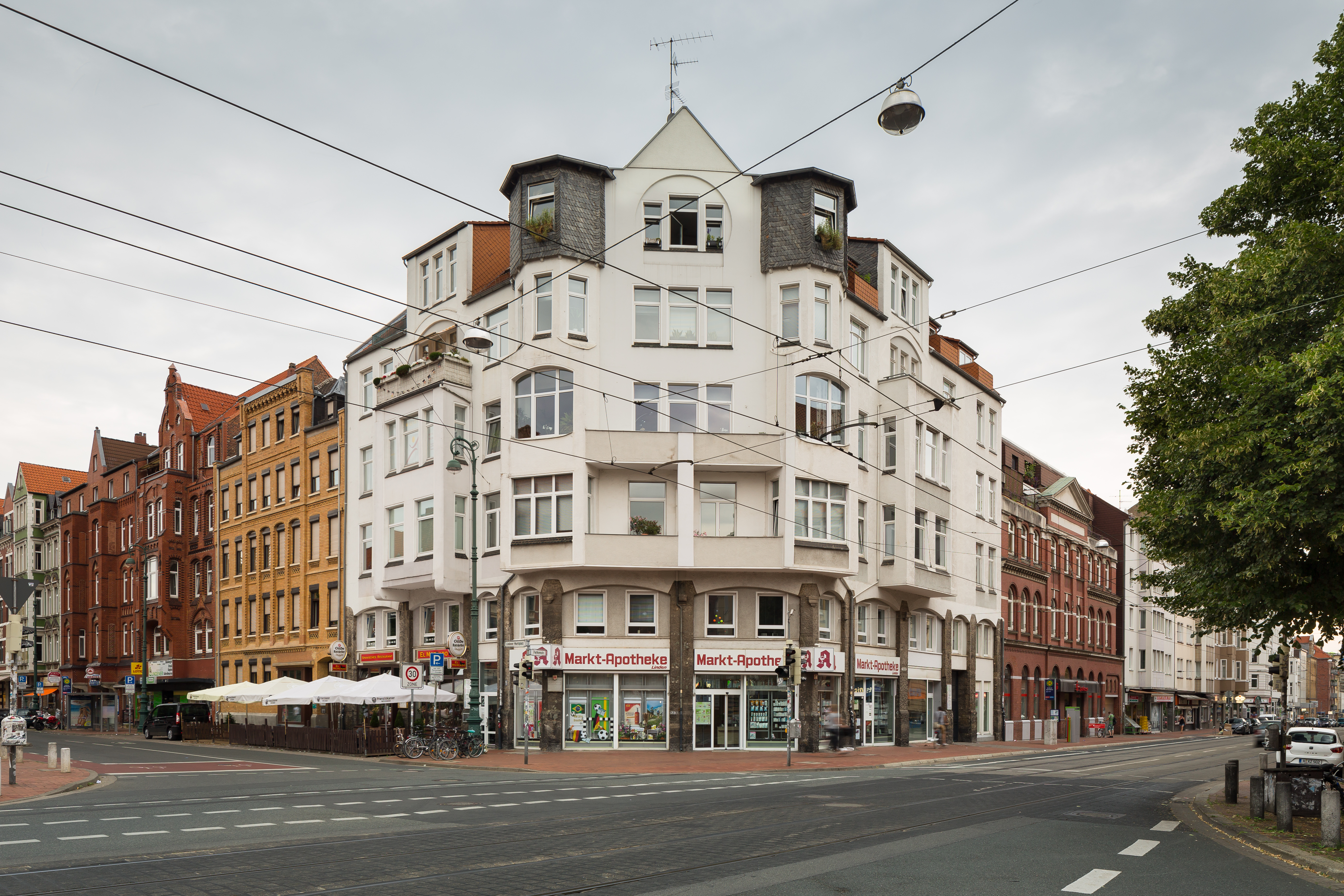
- The building where Hannah Arendt was born.

- Location of Linden-Limmer in Hanover
- Interactive map of Linden-Limmer
- Location within Germany Location within Lower Saxony
- Coordinates: 52.3689°N 9.7008°E
- Country: Germany
- State: Lower Saxony
- City: Hanover
- Subdivisions: 4 quarters

Area
  - Total: 8.18 km^{2} (3.16 sq mi)

Population (2020-12-31)
  - Total: 44,941
  - Density: 5,490/km^{2} (14,200/sq mi)
- Time zone: UTC+01:00 (CET)
  - Summer (DST): UTC+02:00 (CEST)
- Dialling codes: 0511

Linden-Limmer (German pronunciation: [ˈlɪndn̩ ˈlɪmɐ]) is the tenth borough (Stadtbezirk) of Hanover, the state capital of Lower Saxony. It became part of the city in 1920. Linden-Limmer is where Hannah Arendt was born. It has 44,941 inhabitants (2020) and consists of the quarters (Stadtteile) of Linden-Mitte (12,192 residents), Linden-Nord (16,433 residents), Linden-Süd (10,068 inhabitants) and Limmer (6,248 inhabitants).

== Population development ==

The graph shows the population development in the district of Linden-Limmer since 1 January 2005.

== Linden ==
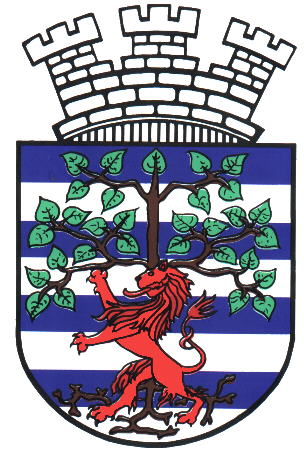
The coat of arms of Linden.

The village of Linden was built around a count's court around the year 1100 on the northern slope of the Lindener Berg and developed into an industrial city during the 19th century before being incorporated into Hanover in 1920. Linden today consists of the quarters of Linden-Mitte, Linden-Nord and Linden-Süd. It is characterized by a diverse gastronomy scene and a high proportion of students and residents with a migrant background. Linden is noted for its civic commitment to the wider Hanover community, with cultural activities (such as the Fährmannsfest) having a city-wide attraction.

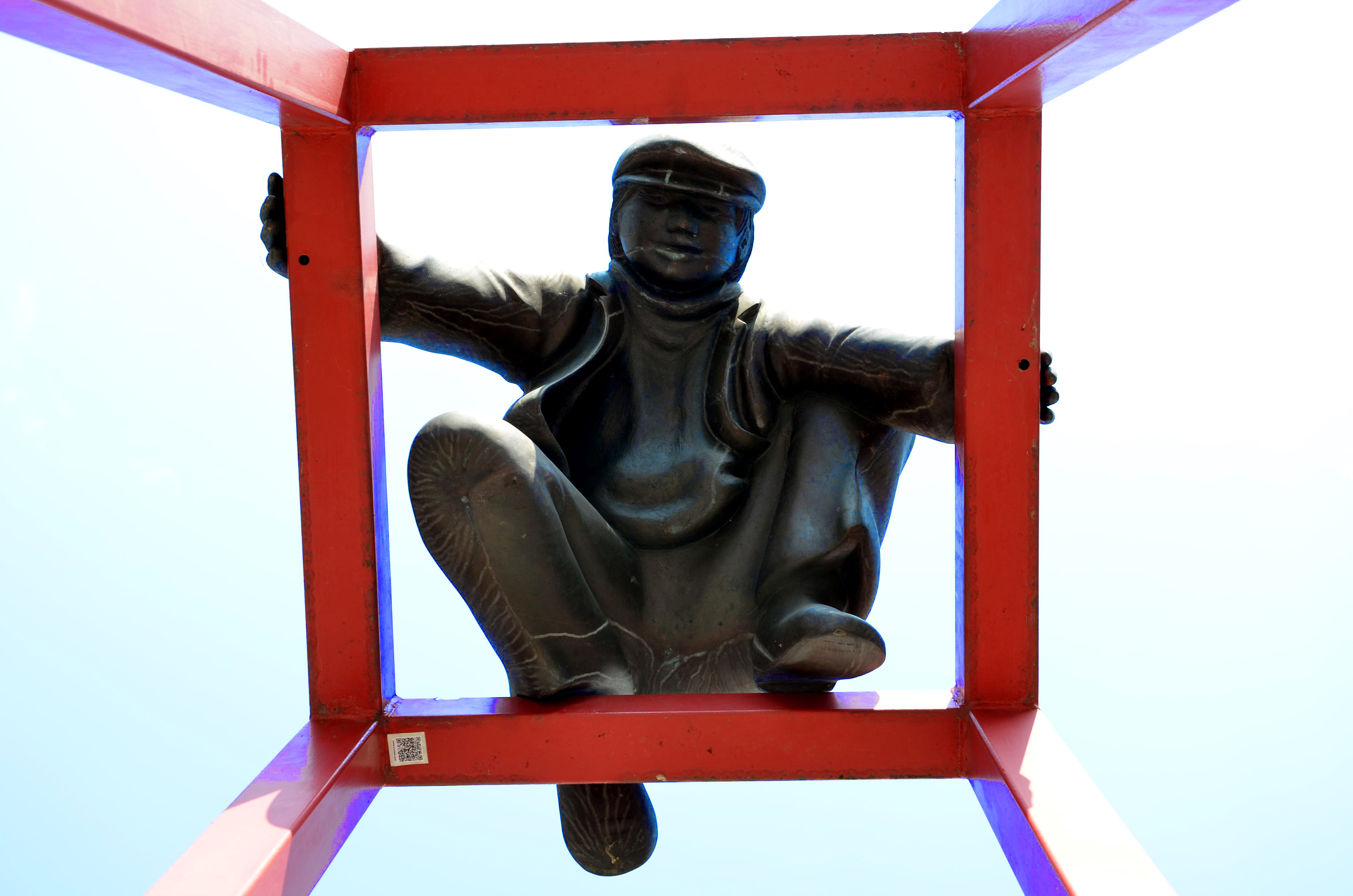
The Lindener Butjer sculpture by Ulrike Enders.

The expression of the local self-understanding is the Lindener Butjer, embodied by a sculpture of a little boy from the 20th century playing in a public square. The term Butjer was originally an insult used by the inhabitants of Hanover to refer to uninvited guests from the then suburbs of the city; the inhabitants of Linden took the term for themselves as an honorary term and have since proudly called themselves Butjer.

== Limmer ==
Limmer is bounded to the north by the Leine River, in the east by an expressway, in the south by the Fösse, and in the west by the Stichkanal Hannover-Linden artificial branch of the Leine and the Hanover freight bypass railway.

== Borough Council ==
The Linden-Limmer borough council consists of 21 elected members. At its constituent meeting on the 11th of November 2021, the borough council re-elected for a parliamentary term of five years Rainer-Jörg Grube (Greens) as borough mayor, who has held the office for many terms. The deputy borough mayor, Katharina-Sophia Gerking (SPD), was also re-elected. The borough council meets in public about nine times a year, mostly in the Freizeitheim Linden but occasionally in the community hall of the St. Nicholas Church in Limmer as well. The distribution of seats, the members of the borough council and their accessibility are presented on the city website.

From January 1988 to November 1996, Hiltrud Grote (SPD) was the district mayor. She was the first female borough mayor in Hanover.

In its main statutes, the city of Hanover has made use of a provision in the Lower Saxony Municipal Constitution Act that allows the members of the council, whose electoral area is in whole or in part in the respective city district or where they live, belong to the city district council with an advisory vote.
