= Fet =

Fet, Fett or FET may refer to:

== People ==
- Abram Ilyich Fet (1924–2007), Russian mathematician
- Afanasy Fet (1820–1892), Russian poet
- George Fett (1920–1989), American cartoonist
- Harry Fett (1875–1962), Norwegian art historian and industrialist
- Jana Fett (born 1996), Croatian tennis player
- Samantha Fett, American politician
- Sondre Brunstad Fet (born 1997), Norwegian footballer

== Fictional characters ==
- Boba Fett, a Star Wars character
- Cassus Fett, a Star Wars character
- Jango Fett, a Star Wars character

== Acronyms ==
=== Science and technology ===
- Field-effect transistor
- Flash emulation tool, a device for emulating a flash memory
- Forum Energy Technologies, an American oilfield products company
- FET protein family
- [^{18}F]fluoroethyl-L-tyrosine, a neuro-oncologic radiotracer
- FET (timetabling software), for schools

=== Other acronyms ===
- Falange Española Tradicionalista y de las Juntas de Ofensiva Nacional Sindicalista, the political party of Francoist Spain
- FarEasTone, a telecommunications company based in Taiwan
- Female Engagement Team, a group of female military personnel which undertakes gender-suited tasks
- Functional Ensemble of Temperament, a neurochemical model
- Further-eastern European Time

== Other uses ==
- Fet, Norway, a former municipality in Akershus county
- Fet Church (Luster), Vestland county, Norway
- Fet (crater), on Mercury
- Fett (magazine), a Norwegian feminist magazine
- FET, a Mazda F engine
- FET, IATA airport code and FAA location identifier for Fremont Municipal Airport (Nebraska), United States
- FET, airline code for Old Dominion Freight Lines - see List of airline codes
- A nickname for FetLife

== See also ==
- Phet (disambiguation)
- Fête
