= Fossa =

Fossa may refer to:

== Animals ==
- Fossa (animal), the common name of a carnivoran mammal of genus Cryptoprocta endemic to Madagascar
- Fossa, the Latin genus name of the Malagasy civet, a related but smaller mammal endemic to Madagascar

== Geography ==
- Fossá, a waterfall in the Faroe islands
- Fossa (river), the name of several rivers in Iceland

== People ==
- Bernardino of Fossa (1420–1503), Italian Franciscan historian and ascetical writer
- François de Fossa (1775–1849), French classical guitarist and composer
- José Fossa (1902–1967), Argentine footballer
- La Fossa, an Italian rap group
- Tony Fossas (born 1957), Cuban baseball player

== Places ==
- Fossa, Abruzzo, a town in Italy
- Fossa, County Kerry, a village and parish in Ireland
- Fossá, Faroe Islands, an abandoned village
- Fossa Beg, a townland in the parish of Tomgraney, County Clare
- Fossa More, a townland in the parish of Tomgraney, County Clare

== Other uses ==
- Fossa (anatomy), a depression in part of the body
- Fossa (planetary nomenclature), a depression in a planet
- Fossa, a fosse (ditch or moat) in ancient Roman contexts
- Fossa, a drowning pit used for executions
- Formaggio di fossa, a cheese matured in pits native to Romagna, Italy

== See also ==
- Fosse (disambiguation)
- Fossato (disambiguation)
