= Lindener Butjer =

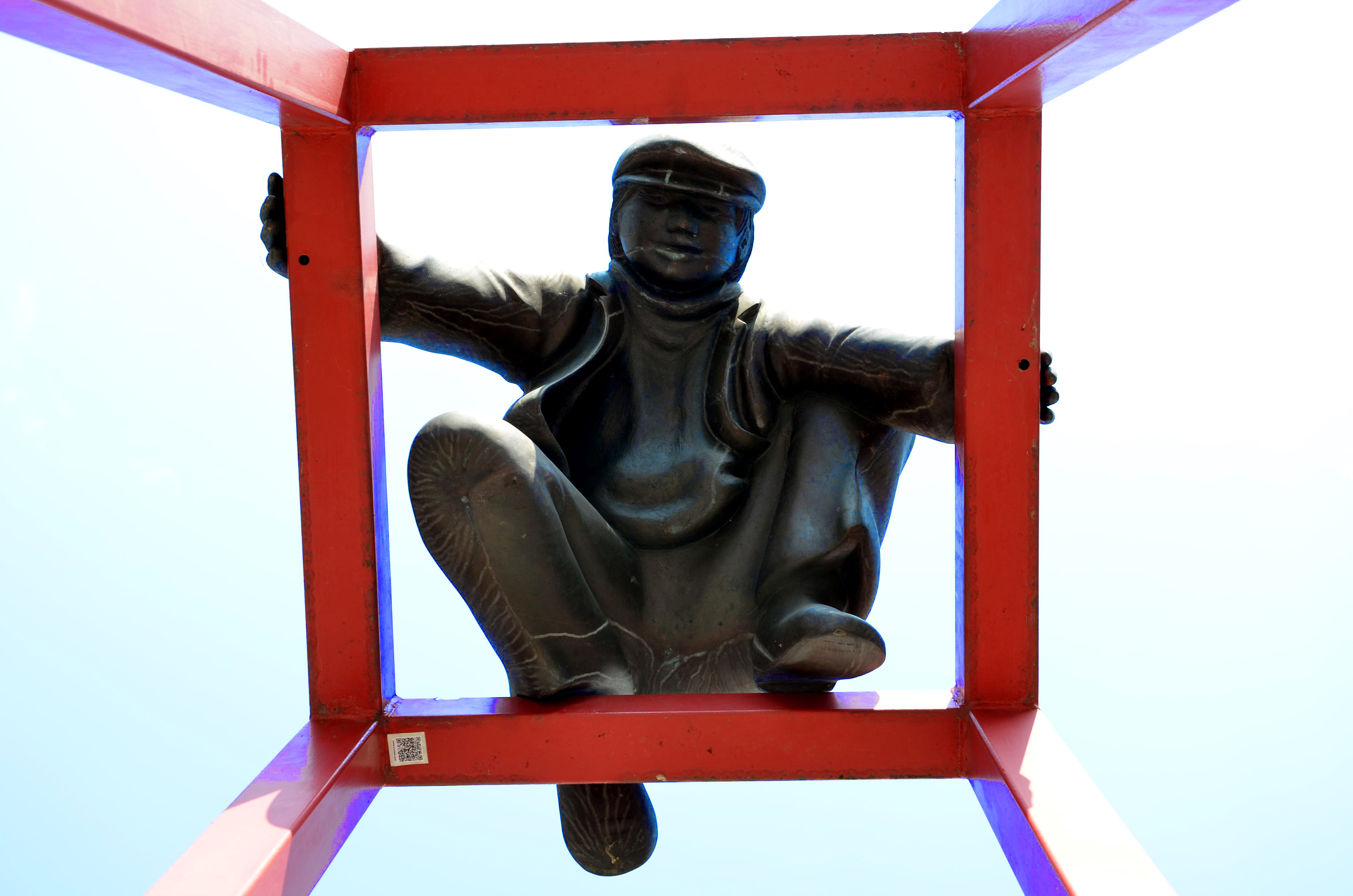
Sculpture of the Linden Butjer.

The Lindener Butjer is a sculpture of a Butjer, a Low German term for energetic little boy, by the German sculptor Ulrike Enders. Since April 2022, it has been located in a public space along the Stephanusstraße in the Linden-Limmer borough of Hanover.

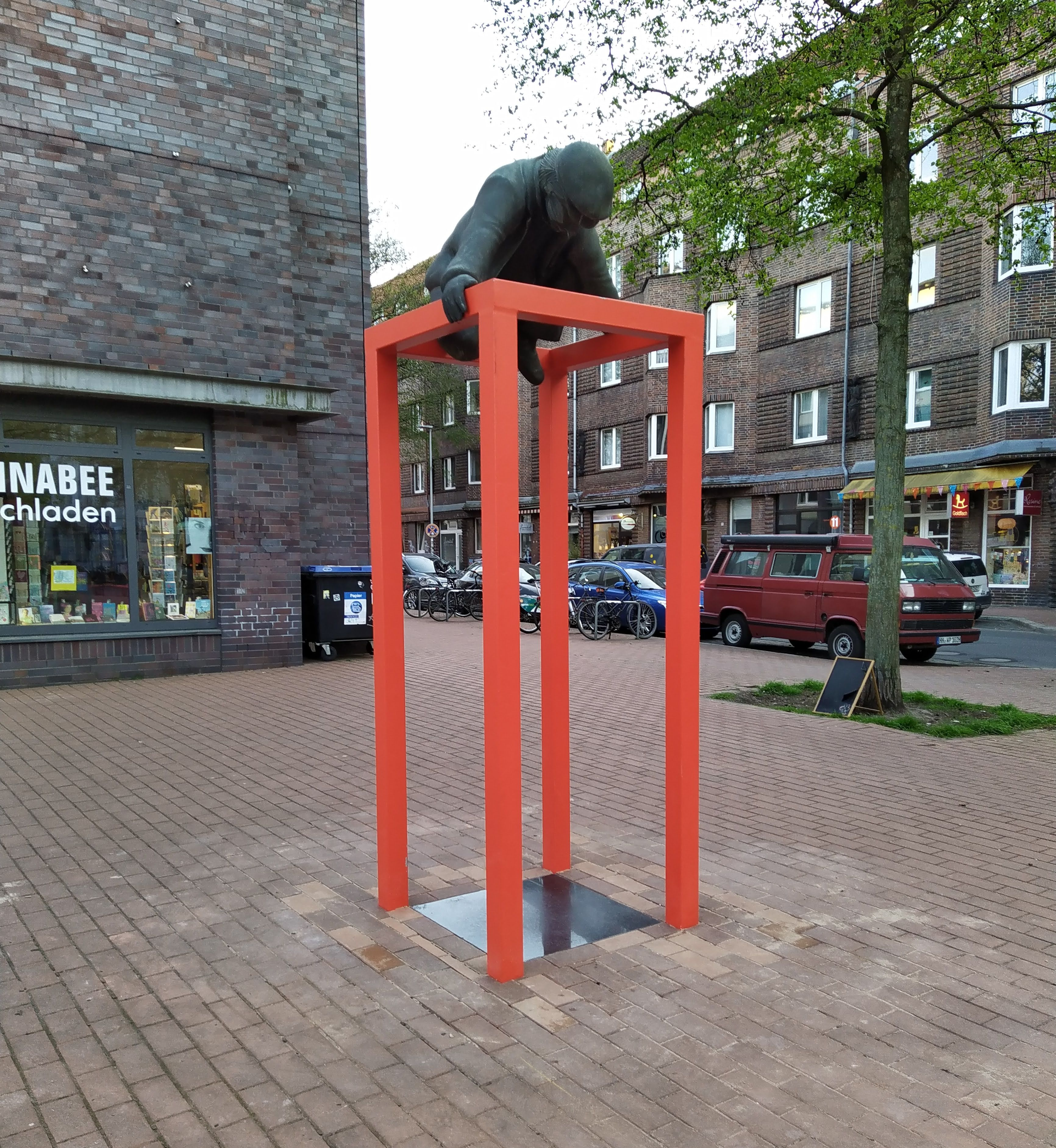
View of the sculpture in its present location along the Stephanusstraße.

== History ==
The inhabitants of Hanover originally used the term Butjer as an insult referring to uninvited guests from what was then the suburbs of the city, or 'people who came in from outside.' The inhabitants of Linden, which was originally a suburb of Hanover until its incorporation into the city in 1920, have since taken the term for themselves as an honorary term and have proudly called themselves Butjer.

In 1990, on the occasion of the 100th anniversary of the Lindener Volksbank the bank erected the Lindener Butjer sculpture in front of its headquarters in honor of the borough - "even if a true Butjer does not bow to capital."

The work of art shows a typical working-class boy climbing on a red painted steel scaffold, wearing a peaked cap and smiling, looking down at the viewer from above. Depending on the point of view, a white painted firewall with the colorful inscription Living Linden can be seen in the background, referring to the Living Linden Association, which "aims to promote the connection between the citizens and the district."

For over thirty years, the sculpture sat at its initial location in front of the headquarters of the former Lindener Volksbank, known today as Hannoversche Volksbank, along the Minister-Stüve-Straße in the Hanover borough of Linden-Limmer. In April 2022, prior to the building being demolished and replaced by a residential building, the sculpture was moved roughly 40 meters west and is now alongside the Stephanusstraße near a playground.
