= Forest Lodge, New South Wales =

Forest Lodge
- Suburb
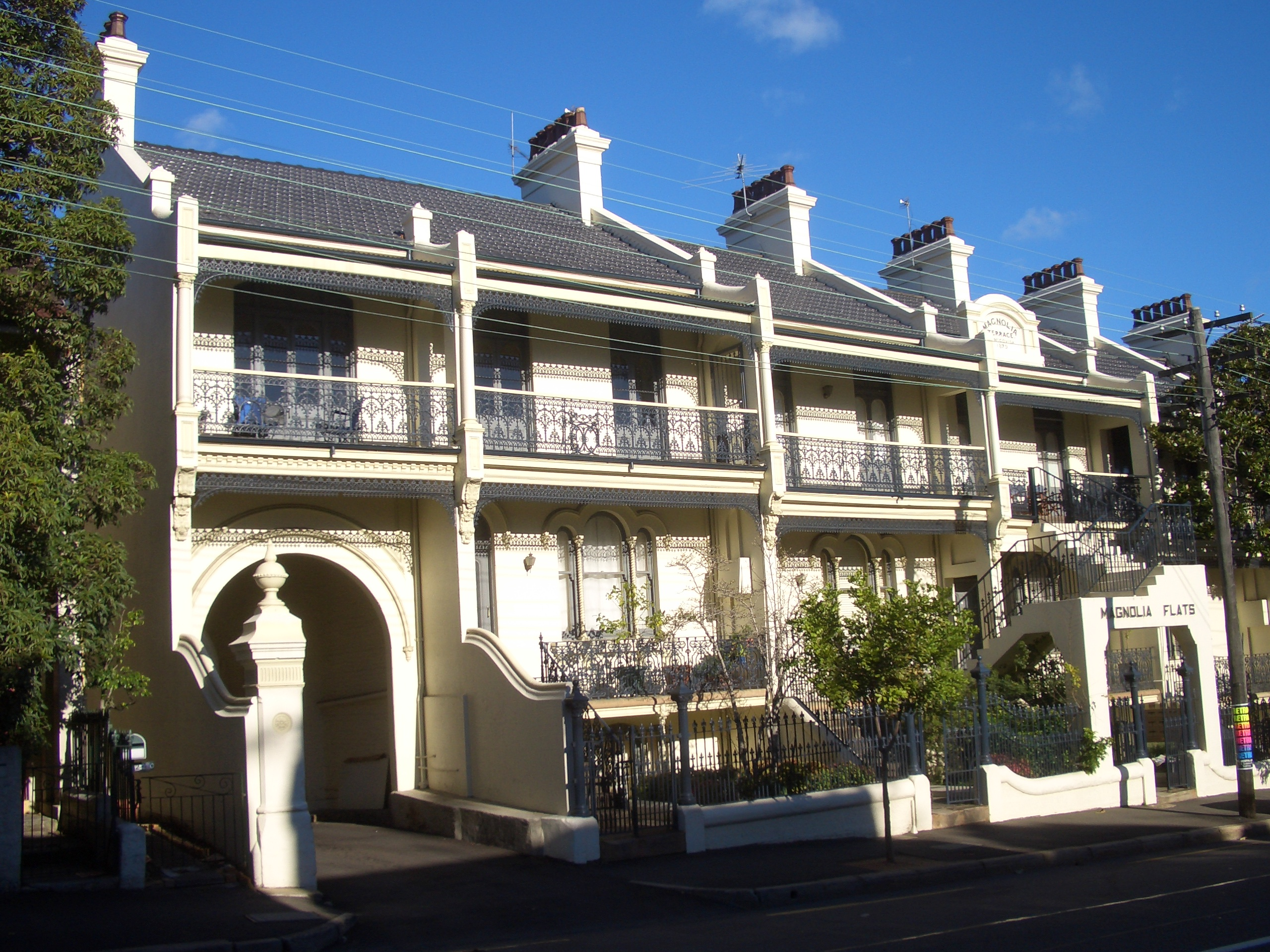
- Pyrmont Bridge Road

- Interactive map of Forest Lodge
- Country: Australia
- State: New South Wales
- City: Sydney
- LGA: City of Sydney
- Location: 4 km (2.5 mi) SW of Sydney CBD

Government
  - State electorate: Balmain
  - Federal division: Sydney

Area
  - Total: 0.45 km^{2} (0.17 sq mi)
- Elevation: 22 m (72 ft)

Population
  - Total: 4,965 (SAL 2021)
  - Density: 11,033/km^{2} (28,580/sq mi)
- Postcode: 2037
Suburbs around Forest Lodge
	Glebe	Glebe
Annandale	Forest Lodge	Glebe
	Camperdown

Forest Lodge is a small, inner-west suburb of Sydney, in the state of New South Wales, Australia. Forest Lodge is located 4 kilometres south-west of the Sydney central business district and is part of the local government area of the City of Sydney.

== Location ==
Ross Street and the intersecting St Johns Road, form the centre of the neighbourhood, with a small collection of bars, cafes and antique stores. The area is popular with students from the nearby University of Sydney and UTS. It is considered to be a quieter alternative to neighbouring Glebe, which shares many of its features. The housing stock is predominantly Victorian, a sizeable proportion of which has been converted into apartment houses in varying states of restoration.

== Schools ==
Forest Lodge Public School is on the corner of Pyrmont Bridge Road and Ross Street. The University of Sydney Centre for Peace and Conflict Studies is located here, as is the Medical Foundation.

== Landmarks ==
Historic points of interest include the Forest Lodge Public School and the Chapman Steps. The former Alexandra Hospital is past the southern boundary in Camperdown and the Glebe Town Hall is just over the eastern boundary of the suburb at Mount Vernon Street, Glebe.
At the intersection of Wigram Road and Minogue Crescent can be found the Lew Hoad Reserve, a small park named in honour of Lew Hoad. Hoad was born in 1934 and grew up at 43 Wigram Road. He learned to play tennis in the area and from the age of nine was a daily visitor to the Police Boy's Club next to the reserve where he participated in boxing, wrestling, gymnastics, athletics, cricket and rugby league. Hoad went on to be a member of Australia's four Davis Cup winning squads in 1952 to 1956, won Wimbledon twice and was the world's number one tennis player in 1956 before turning professional. The reserve was named after him in 1965.

The Forest Lodge Hotel (commonly referred to as 'The Flodge') is popular with students and families, and won the TimeOut Pub Awards in 2015, 2016, and was nominated in 2017.

== History ==
Forest Lodge was named after a house built in the area in 1836 by Ambrose Foss. The house stood on the present site of 208-210 Bridge Road until it was demolished in 1912.

== Population ==
At the 2021 census, the population of Forest Lodge had increased to 4,965, from 4,583 people in 2016. 78.9% of people were attending an educational institution and of these, 51.7% were in a tertiary or technical institution. In Forest Lodge, 55.7% of people were born in Australia. The next most common countries of birth were China 7.0%, England 5.9% and New Zealand 3.2%. 69.9% of people spoke only English at home. Other languages spoken at home included Mandarin at 7.3%. The most common responses for religion were No Religion 61.3% and Catholic 13.7%. Of the employed people in Forest Lodge 6.1% worked in Higher Education. Other major industries of employment included Computer System Design and Related Services 5.8% and Hospitals (except Psychiatric Hospitals) 5.4%. The rate of car use was lower than average, with 14.4% of people travelling to work by car, compared with the national average of 57.8%. Of occupied private dwellings in Forest Lodge, 34.6% were semi-detached and 61.6% were flats or apartments.

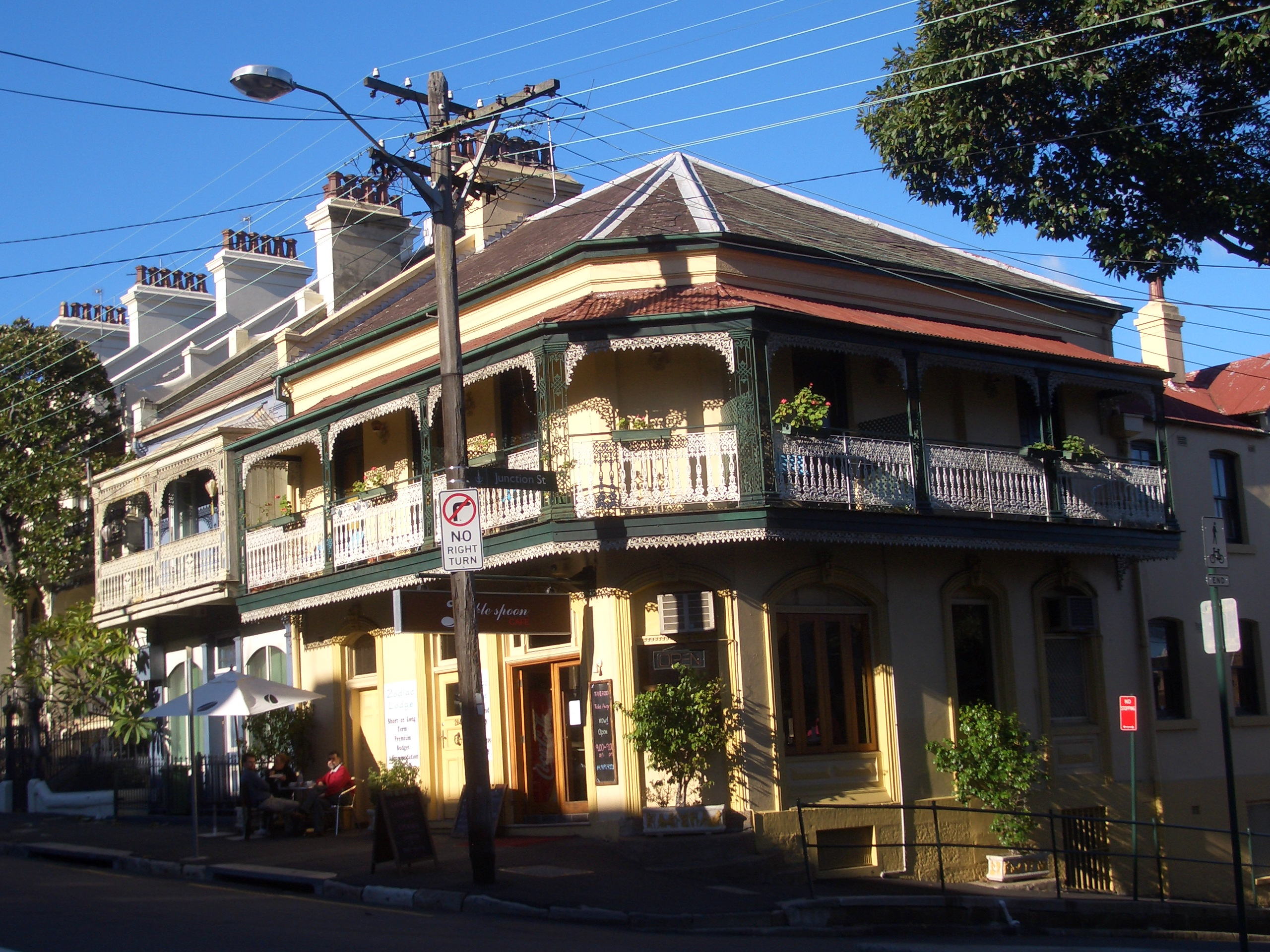
Pyrmont Bridge Road, Forest Lodge

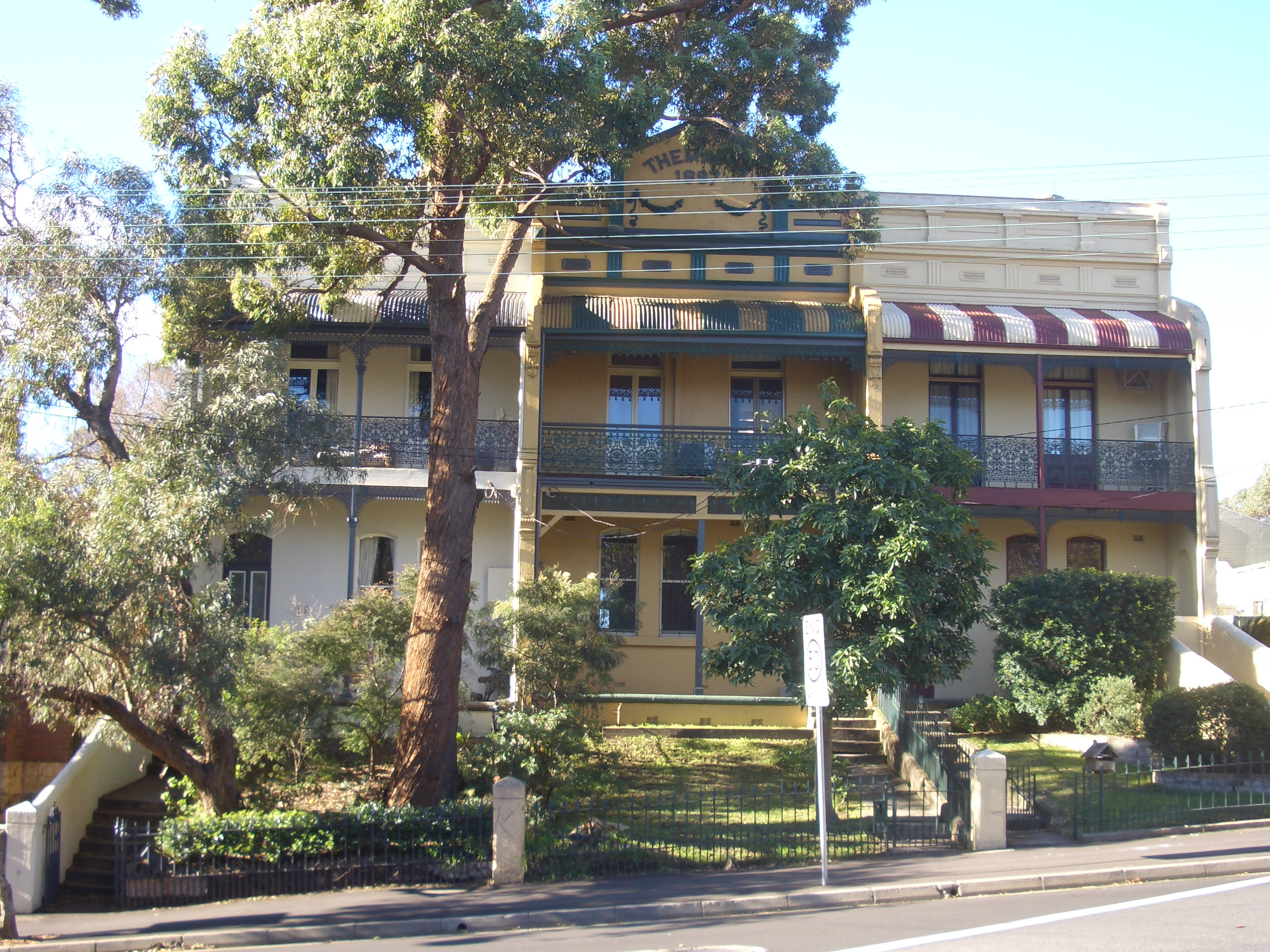
Ross Street
