= Fossato =

Fossato may refer to:

- Fossato Serralta, village and comune in the province of Catanzaro, in the Calabria region of southern Italy
- Fossato di Vico, town and comune of Umbria in the province of Perugia in Italy

== See also ==
- Fossa (disambiguation)
