= TrioVing =

Norwegian lock and security brand

- Company type: Aksjeselskap
- Industry: Locks and security equipment
- Founded: 1971
- Headquarters: Moss, Norway
- Products: Locks, security equipment
- Owner: Assa Abloy

TrioVing is a Norwegian brand of locks and security equipment, now owned by the Swedish lock group Assa Abloy.

The company was formed in 1971, when Christiania Spigerverk combined two lock makers it had acquired: Trio Fabrikker of Oslo, whose origins reached back to the Christiania Dørvriderfabrik of 1864, and the Moss firm Wilhelm Rosenvinge, maker of the "Ving" brand. The headquarters was placed at the Ving plant in Moss, and the company grew into the largest lock manufacturer in the Nordic region, known internationally for the plastic-card VingCard system that became a standard in hotels and cruise ships, and domestically for its "Firmus" cylinder keys.

TrioVing later came under Elkem, then Finnish ownership, and from 1994 belonged to the newly merged Assa Abloy group; it absorbed its sister company Grorud Industrier in 1999 and became a wholly owned Assa Abloy subsidiary in 2004. Production was moved out of Moss to Ski in 2014, and the TrioVing name has been retained as an Assa Abloy trademark.

== Bibliography ==
- Sørnes, Tor (1992). The History of TrioVing.
