= Fosse Farmhouse =

Farmhouse in England

Coordinates: 51.5008°N 2.2458°W

Fosse Farmhouse is an 18th-century farmhouse in the English Cotswolds near the Fosse Way and Castle Combe. It is now used to provide hospitality and accommodation, including bed and breakfast rooms in the main farmhouse and self-contained, self-catering quarters in converted farm buildings – the former barn, dairy and stables. It is especially popular with Japanese since a couple visited in 1989. The proprietor, Caron Cooper, visited Japan where she hosted afternoon tea with scones at the British embassy. The guests included Prince Mikasa and his family, who subsequently came to stay at the farmhouse for three days. In 2012, it was used as a location for the popular Japanese comic and TV animation, Kin-iro Mosaic, and fans of that series now come to stay at the farmhouse too.
