= Fett (magazine) =

Norwegian quarterly feminist magazine

- Editor: Hanne Linn Skogvang
- Categories: Feminist magazine
- Frequency: Quarterly
- Publisher: Kvinnefronten
- Founded: 2004
- First issue: September 2004
- Country: Norway
- Based in: Oslo
- Language: Norwegian
- Website: Fett
- ISSN: 1504-1921
- OCLC: 1023724208

Fett (Norwegian: Fat) is a feminist magazine based in Oslo, Norway. The magazine has been published since 2004 and is the largest feminist magazine in Norway.

== History and profile ==
Fett was first published in 2004. The goal of the magazine is to provide a discussion platform for women. Its target audience, however, is women and men who are interested in gender politics. The magazine is the successor of Kvinnejournalen which was also published by Kvinnefronten (Women's Front) which is based in Oslo. The first issue of Fett appeared in September 2004. During the initial years the magazine took over the subscribers of Kvinnejournalen. Fett was first published five times per year. Later it became a quarterly publication.

Fett has a feminist stance and carries articles on women's social role and status. The first issue contained articles about gender in pop music. Next issue analysed the concept of love from a gender-based perspective.

Fett is financed by Fritt Ord, the Norwegian Cultural Council and Bergen Municipality. The support by Fritt Ord began in 2017.

The founding editor of the magazine is Kristin Engh Førde. As of 2019 the editor of Fett is Hanne Linn Skogvang who was appointed to the post in 2018. She replaced Hedda Lingaas Fossum in the post who became the editor of the magazine in June 2015.
