= Foss (band) =

American rock band from Texas (1993–1995)

- Foss on the cover of the 7-inch EP The El Paso Pussycats (1993) Left to right: O'Rourke, Klahr, and Stevens. Not pictured: Bixler-Zavala (there is a photo of him on the record's back cover).

Background information
- Origin: El Paso, Texas, U.S.
- Genres: Post-hardcore; emo
- Years active: 1993–1995
- Spinoffs: At the Drive-In
- Past members: Cedric Bixler-Zavala; Arlo Klahr; Beto O'Rourke; Mike Stevens
- Website: myspace.com/fossband (defunct; archival link via the Internet Archive)

Foss was an American rock band formed in El Paso, Texas in the early 1990s. It is known for former members Cedric Bixler-Zavala, who found success in the music industry as the singer for the rock bands At the Drive-In and the Mars Volta, as well as Beto O'Rourke, who later was a U.S. Representative and candidate for U.S. Senator, U.S. President, and Governor of Texas.

Typically described as a post-hardcore band, Foss's sound incorporated elements of punk rock, emo, and indie rock styles of the period. The members of Foss espoused the DIY ("Do-It-Yourself") ethic and were influenced by the independent label Dischord Records and punk zines like Maximumrocknroll. The band released a handful of recordings and embarked on two tours spanning parts of the United States and Canada. Foss appeared on Let's Get Real With Bill Lowrey, an evangelical show on El Paso public-access television, after tricking the show's producers into believing they were a Christian rock band. Video of the chaotic performance later resurfaced on YouTube.

The DIY ethos adopted by Foss informed some of O'Rourke's later political decisions, such as his Senate campaign's pledge not to accept financial contributions from PACs (political action committees). During the campaign, the press often remarked on Foss and O'Rourke's connection to Bixler-Zavala, who was by then a well-known musician. Political commentators noted that O'Rourke's past membership in a punk band likely boosted his credibility, image, and political appeal, particularly among younger voters. The Republican Party of Texas mockingly tweeted the cover of Foss's record The El Paso Pussycats, which depicts O'Rourke wearing a dress.

== Background ==
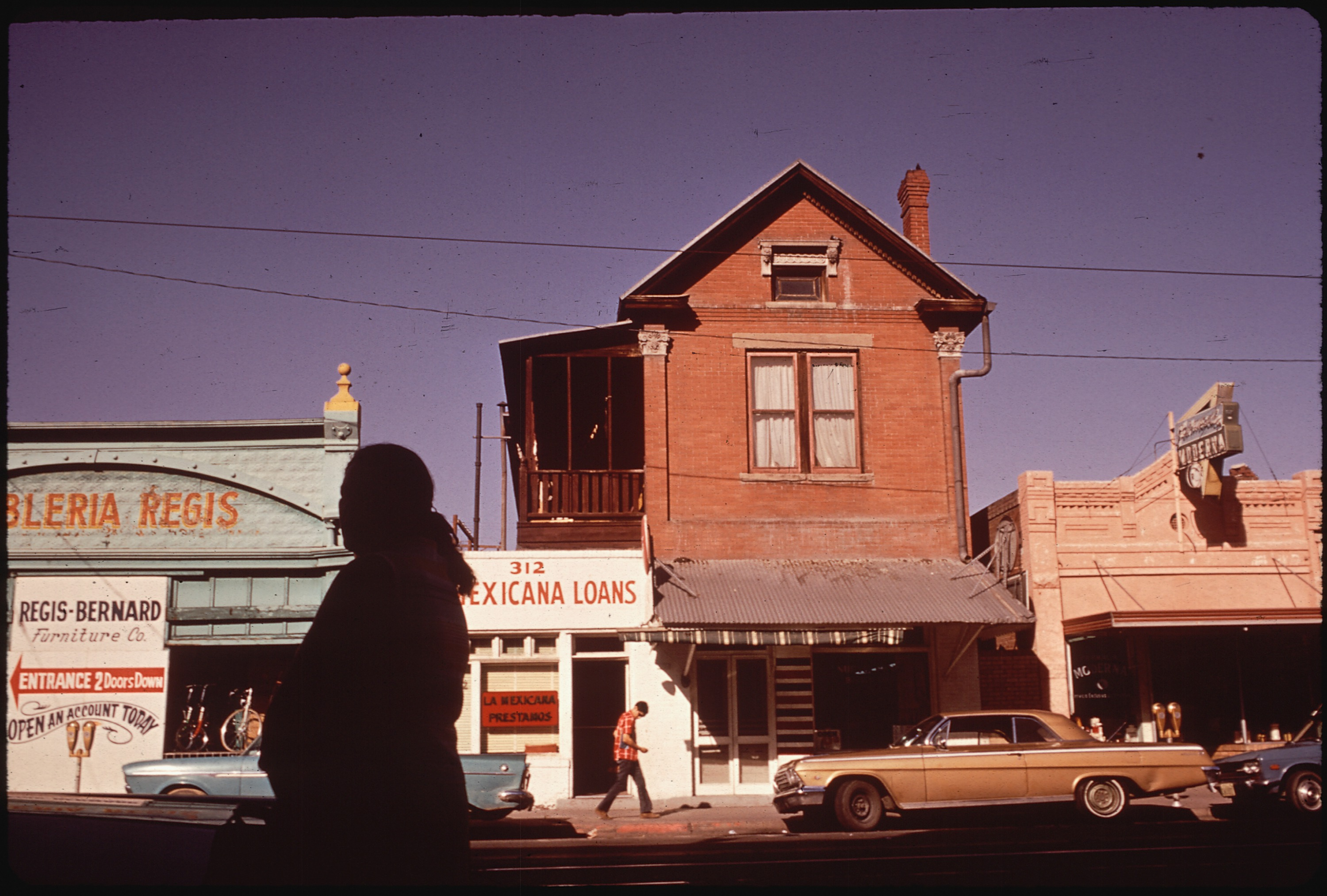
El Paso, Texas, 1972—the year O'Rourke was born. As an alienated teen, O'Rourke found a sense of community in El Paso's small punk scene.

Born and raised in El Paso, Beto O'Rourke felt alienated from the city as an adolescent in the 1980s. He told The Texas Observer that, in the El Paso of his youth, "There was nothing dangerous. There was no energy. There was no risk." He was exposed to rock music at a young age and soon became an avid fan of punk rock. (Note: As a child, O'Rourke listened to bands like The Beatles with his sister. In eighth grade, O'Rourke was introduced to punk rock through the Clash's London Calling (1979), an album he later called "a revelation". By the time he was 14 or 15 years old, he started going to local punk shows. He soon discovered Dischord Records, a Washington, D.C.-based independent label with a catalog of punk music, and began reading punk zines like Maximumrocknroll and Flipside.) In a profile of O'Rourke for The Washington Post, Ben Terris wrote that the young O'Rourke "wanted nothing more than to get out of town", and that the band Foss was formed "with the hopes of traveling the world". El Paso's punk scene, though small, helped O'Rourke find a sense of community in the city.

O'Rourke left El Paso High School and began attending Woodberry Forest School, an all-male boarding school in Virginia. During school breaks he returned to El Paso and continued immersing himself in its punk scene. He frequented DIY shows at the local venue Campus Queen, where shows were organized by Ed Ivey of the punk band Rhythm Pigs. O'Rourke met Cedric Bixler-Zavala when the latter played a show at the Campus Queen in a Misfits cover band. Bixler-Zavala later said "[b]eing with [O'Rourke] is what turned me into the kind of musician I am today" and "[t]he way I make art, I learned it from Beto. He was learning as he went along, too, but he was sort of my older brother/mentor."

O'Rourke joined his first band, called Swipe, after he left El Paso to attend Columbia University in New York. Swipe played shows at bars and clubs in New York and once opened for the Olympia, Washington-based punk band Fitz of Depression.

== History ==
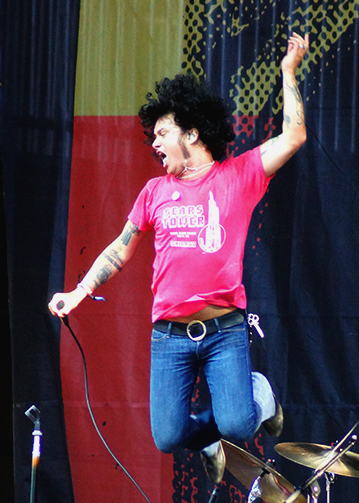
Cedric Bixler-Zavala, a founding member of Foss, is better known as the singer of At the Drive-In and the Mars Volta (pictured performing with At the Drive-In in 2012).

O'Rourke and Bixler-Zavala formed Foss along with Mike Stevens and Arlo Klahr. They took the name "Foss" from the Icelandic word for "waterfall". The members of Foss formed their own label, Western Breed Records, and issued a 7-inch record, titled The El Paso Pussycats. Reportedly titled after a failed television pilot about crime-fighting women, The El Paso Pussycats shows O'Rourke wearing a floral-pattern dress on its cover. The dress belonged to Maggie Asfahani, O'Rourke's girlfriend at the time, who later said "There's nothing particularly complicated about it—we were all hanging out, and someone thought it would be funny if we switched clothes, the girls and guys. That was all, just being different." Other Foss recordings included a self-titled demo and a full-length album, Fewel Street (sometimes spelled Fewell or St.). The label Western Breed later issued some of the earliest releases by Bixler-Zavala's band At the Drive-In.

Foss embarked on two tours of North America during O'Rourke's summer breaks following his sophomore and junior years in college. O'Rourke and Klahr organized the tours with the help of Book Your Own Fucking Life, a DIY guide published by Maximum Rocknroll that provided resources and contacts for touring bands. On one of the tours, O'Rourke booked a gig as an opening act at a venue in San Francisco by calling, pretending to be a founder of Sub Pop, and claiming the band was about to be signed; the plan worked, but Foss was ejected after playing only two songs. While on tour, Foss met Feist, who was later a member of Broken Social Scene and solo artist.

External videos
- "Foss on Let's Get Real TV show - El Paso, TX- 1994 Pt 3 - The Song" (9:59) – a 1994 Foss live performance on the public-access television show Let's Get Real, via YouTube.
- "Beto O'Rourke with Foss - Live El Paso, Texas 1994" (2:52) — a second clip of Foss performing over the show's credit sequence, via YouTube.

In 1994, an El Paso public-access television show, Let's Get Real With Bill Lowrey, broadcast a Foss performance and interview. Because it was an evangelical program, Foss told the producers they played gospel and Christian rock in order to get on the show. The band quickly wrote a new song for their television debut. The host, Lowrey, later told The Washington Post: "Oh yeah, they kind of pulled a fast one on me. But we enjoyed it. Mostly I can't believe he grew up to be a functioning member of society."

Clips of Foss's performance on Let's Get Real later surfaced on YouTube. Matt Miller of Esquire described Foss' performance as "absolute chaos with the band hopping around and people screaming—you can imagine elderly '90s Texans turning this on and being absolutely terrified". Matthew Adams of The Dallas Morning News called the performance "complete chaos" and said that, based on O'Rourke's musical performances on his 2018 Senate campaign, his musical skills seemed to have improved since the 1990s.

== Musical style and influences ==
"Rise"
Critics have compared the sound of "Rise", from side B of Foss's 7-inch record The El Paso Pussycats, to bands from the post-hardcore, indie rock, and emo scenes of the 1990s.

External audio
Vinyl rip of Foss's The El Paso Pussycats via SoundCloud, provided to uploader Remezcla courtesy of Cedric Bixler-Zavala.

Andy Cush of Spin described Foss as a post-hardcore band. Foss has also been labeled "emo-punk", as first-wave emo was a significant influence on the band's sound. O'Rourke, a fan of bands on Dischord Records like Minor Threat and Rites of Spring, took inspiration from the label's independence and commitment to the DIY ethic, as he told Cush in 2017:

"What I also really loved was the way that they did it. They were running this out of a house. They started their own label, they were booking their own tours, everybody wrote their own songs. There was an honest ethic to everything they did. ... It was people instead of a machine in every way possible. And that, for me, could describe punk rock. It was people sharing their stories in a very honest, direct, powerful way. It was so completely at odds to corporate rock'n'roll, the overly produced, test-marketed, focus-grouped kind of music that was coming out over the radio. There were no intermediaries. It was you and the musician, physically at the show, or maybe buying their record through the pages of [Maximumrocknroll]. ... All of that stuff had a big impact on me."

Bixler-Zavala recalled that O'Rourke introduced him to punk and indie bands like Rites of Spring and Dinosaur Jr., which shifted him away from his earlier musical interest in dub and rock bands like the Grateful Dead, The Black Crowes, and Blue Cheer. Klahr, a fan of punk and indie music from Australia and New Zealand, introduced his Foss bandmates to bands like The Saints, The Clean, and The Scientists.

Rolling Stone posted the Foss song "Rise"—courtesy of O'Rourke—in 2018, making the band's music widely available for the first time. Rolling Stone's Tessa Stuart said the song was "lo-fi slacker rock" stylistically indebted to Fugazi and Guided by Voices. According to Eric Grubbs of the Dallas Observer, "Rise" was akin to "13 Songs-era Fugazi by way of Pavement's lo-fi masterpiece Slanted and Enchanted". Eduardo Cepeda of Remezcla detected the influence of Rites of Spring and Government Issue. Michael Roffman at Consequence of Sound said "Rise" was a "chalky slice of alternative rock that wouldn't be out of place on a compilation album alongside Sunny Day Real Estate".

== After Foss ==
Foss disbanded in part because O'Rourke realized he "wasn't that good at" playing music. In addition, O'Rourke said, his father pressured him about the student loans he had taken out to attend Columbia University.

After leaving Foss, O'Rourke performed with several other bands, including Fragile Gang, the Swedes, and the Sheeps. Between 1999 and 2002, O'Rourke ran an alt-weekly newspaper, Stanton Street, with his former Foss bandmate Stevens as the managing editor. When O'Rourke was a member of the El Paso City Council, he said his former Foss bandmates had "all gone on to successful musical careers, confirming their talent and my lack thereof".

Bixler-Zavala later gained notice as the singer of post-hardcore band At the Drive-In and Grammy Award-winning progressive rock band the Mars Volta, in addition to numerous other musical endeavors. The first published mention of Foss came in a post at the webzine Buddyhead, published shortly before the release of At the Drive-In's third album Relationship of Command (2000). In the 2005 book New Wave of American Heavy Metal, a guide to hundreds of American and Canadian bands in metal and related genres, the entry for At the Drive-In mentions Foss as "Faus".

=== Impact on Beto O'Rourke's political career ===
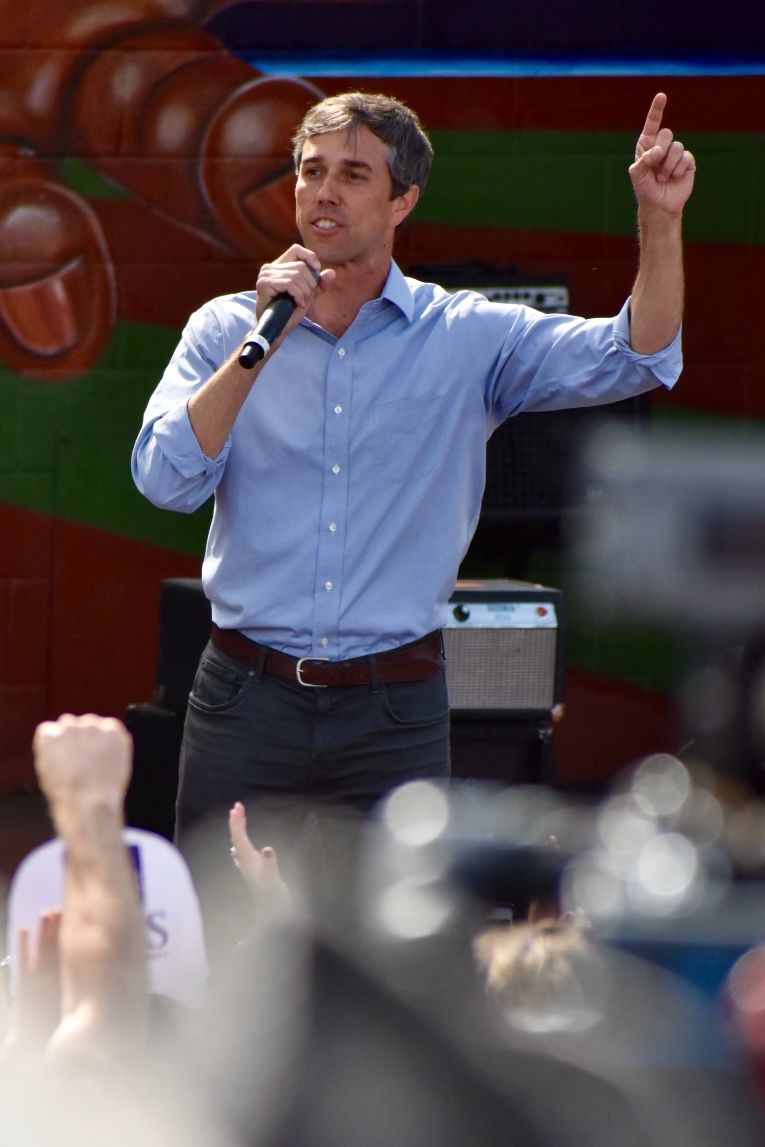
Foss became the subject of renewed attention when Beto O'Rourke campaigned in the 2018 US Senate election in Texas.

In March 2017, when O'Rourke—then a member of the U.S. House of Representatives—announced that he was running in the 2018 US Senate election in Texas, numerous publications commented on O'Rourke's musical past. Music news outlets like Spin, Pitchfork, Alternative Press, and Consequence of Sound reported on O'Rourke's campaign by noting his connection with Bixler-Zavala, who had by then become a notable figure in rock music. The news service Reuters described O'Rourke as an "ex-punk rocker" in a headline and detailed his time with Foss. By March 2018, Dan Solomon of Texas Monthly remarked that O'Rourke "seemingly can't escape a single profile without the words 'punk rock Democrat' appearing in the headline".

O'Rourke often highlighted his days with Foss in interviews. Political observers and journalists felt that O'Rourke's punk past became an important element of his image and political outlook. In an op-ed for The New York Times, Mimi Swartz expressed her belief that O'Rourke's former membership in a punk band had likely boosted his appeal with millennials. Foss's records were cited as evidence that O'Rourke had adopted his nickname prior to his political career. (Note: O'Rourke's full legal name is Robert Francis O'Rourke, and he is not Hispanic or Latino. The nickname "Beto" is a diminutive form of Spanish first names that end in "-berto", such as Alberto or Roberto. During his Senate campaign, he had been accused of adopting the name "Beto" to pander to Hispanic and Latino voters. However, O'Rourke went by the nickname long before he had considered a political career—as early as elementary school—and in the credits for Foss's recordings, he used the name "Beto" rather than "Robert".)

O'Rourke's former Foss bandmates supported his Senate campaign. Stevens played with his band 83 Skiddoo for an O'Rourke fundraiser in Springfield, Missouri. Bixler-Zavala expressed his support for O'Rourke several times and, after O'Rourke lost the election, tweeted "I can only hope you run for president".

On August 28, 2018, after O'Rourke had declined a debate against the incumbent Ted Cruz, the Republican Party of Texas's Twitter account tweeted "Maybe Beto can't debate Ted Cruz because he already had plans", attaching the cover of Foss's record The El Paso Pussycats with the caption "Sorry, can't debate. We have a gig." Though the tweet mocked O'Rourke, it was widely reported as inadvertently making him look appealing. Others interpreted the tweet as intended, and the Texas GOP briefly responded to the backlash. (Note: The Texas GOP account responded to the backlash with another tweet, which read: "Based on the reaction to our tweets we can confirm that Beto is in fact going to receive 100% of the vote from Buzzfeed [sic] contributors, out of state liberals, and people who use the word 'rad.' We feel very owned :'(." Others had taken the Texas GOP tweet's message as intended: Jeff Roe, a Republican political consultant, tweeted to express his distaste and amusement to see O'Rourke crossdressing, negatively comparing the photo to Bill Clinton's saxophone performance on The Arsenio Hall Show. Columnist Paul Waldman cited the tweet, and the various reactions to it, as a quintessential example of the post-1960s American culture war. In response to the Texas GOP tweet, O'Rourke supporters posted a high school photo of Cruz dressed as a mime playing Adam in a play based on the Book of Genesis, which also went viral.)

On March 3, 2020, Cedric Bixler-Zavala denounced O'Rourke for his endorsement of 2020 presidential candidate Joe Biden. Bixler-Zavala, a supporter of Bernie Sanders, responded to a follower on Instagram who said O'Rourke's support of Biden “bummed me out bad” to which Bixler-Zavala responded, “me too.”

== Personnel ==
- Cedric Bixler-Zavala – drums, vocals
- Arlo Klahr – guitar, vocals
- Beto O'Rourke – bass guitar, vocals
- Mike Stevens – guitar, vocals

== Discography ==
=== Albums ===
- Fewel Street (1995)

=== EPs ===
- The El Paso Pussycats (1993)
- Foss (1993)
