= Den Norske Slipeskivefabrik =

Former Norwegian grinding-wheel factory

- Company type: Aksjeselskap
- Industry: Abrasives
- Founded: 1916
- Defunct: 1986
- Fate: Merged with Foss Slipeskivefabrik
- Headquarters: Oslo, Norway
- Key people: Janne Rydström; Ove Collett
- Products: Grinding wheels

Den Norske Slipeskivefabrik (Norwegian for "The Norwegian Grinding Wheel Factory") was a factory in Oslo that produced grinding wheels, with a large output and significant exports. It was established in 1916 as a Norwegian-Swedish venture between Janne Rydström, founder of AB Svenska Smergelskiffabriken, who became chairman, and the Norwegian engineer Ove Collett, who was managing director. Production drew on methods developed by the Swedish company, while the raw materials were Norwegian, supplied in part by Arendal Smelteverk.

The factory was taken over in 1928 by a family company with Alex Madsen as principal shareholder. In August 1944 it was badly damaged in an explosion carried out by the resistance sabotage group Pelle, which struck war-important technology, hitting Foss Slipeskivefabrik at the same time. In 1986 Den Norske Slipeskivefabrik merged with its competitor Foss Slipeskivefabrik of Fet, and production in Oslo was closed and consolidated at Fetsund; that factory was in turn bought by the Dutch competitor Flexovit and closed in 1992.

== Bibliography ==
- Hoffmann, E. (1935). Merkantilt biografisk leksikon: hvem er hvem i næringslivet?. A.S Yrkesforlaget.
