= Frank Foss =

Frank Foss may refer to:

- Frank H. Foss (1865–1947), U.S. Representative from Massachusetts
- Frank Foss (athlete) (1895–1989), American athlete
