= Phet =

Phet may refer to:

- Cyclone Phet, a cyclone formed in the Arabian Sea in 2010
- Amphetamine, a psychostimulant drug
- PhET Interactive Simulations, interactive science and math simulations
