= George Foss =

George Foss may refer to:

- George Edmund Foss (1863–1936), U.S. Representative from Illinois
- George Foote Foss (1876–1968), machinist, blacksmith, bicycle repairman and inventor from Quebec
- George Foss (baseball) (1897–1969), Major League Baseball player
