= Grorud Jernvarefabrikk =

Former Norwegian hardware manufacturer

- Formerly: Grorud Industrier
- Type: Aksjeselskap
- Industry: Hardware
- Founded: 1917
- Founder: Ragnvald Bratz
- Defunct: 2001
- Fate: Acquired by Assa Abloy; merged into TrioVing
- Headquarters: Grorud, Oslo, Norway
- Products: Door and window fittings, saw blades, hand saws

Grorud Jernvarefabrikk (Norwegian for "Grorud Hardware Factory") was a Norwegian industrial company established in Oslo in 1917 by Ragnvald Bratz. It produced door and window fittings as well as products for industry and households, such as saw blades, hand saws, and forestry tools. The company grew into a leading maker of window systems and hinges in Norway, and its products were exported to 27 countries; its Snap-In hinge, prepared for series production in 1971, was widely adopted by door and window makers in many parts of the world.

The business remained in the Bratz family until the Swedish lock group Assa Abloy took it over in 1996, by which time it had taken the name Grorud Industrier AS. In 1999 it was merged into the sister company TrioVing, and the Grorud factory was closed in 2001. From 1962 to 1981 the managing director was Jens Halvard Bratz, son of the founder, who later served as minister of industry in the Willoch government.
