= Fossey =

Fossey may refer to:

- 23032 Fossey, a main-belt asteroid
- A. D. H. Fossey, British-born American politician
- Brigitte Fossey (born 1947), French actress
- Charles Fossey (1869–1946), French assyriologist
- Dian Fossey (1932–1985), American zoologist
- F. J. C. Hearnshaw (1869–1946), English professor of history
- John S. Fossey, British chemist
- Koen Fossey (born 1953), Belgian illustrator
- Marlon Fossey (born 1998), American soccer player
- Steve Fossey, British astronomer

== See also ==
- Fosseys
