= Ambrose Foss =

Ambrose Foss (c. 1803 in England – 4 May 1862) was an Australian alderman, chemist, druggist, dentist and landowner based in Sydney. Together with colleague Edward Hunt, Foss founded the Congregational Church in New South Wales. Foss built a house called Forest Lodge after which a Sydney suburb is named.

== Career ==
In 1828, Foss purchased a chemist shop in Sydney from apothecary John Tawell; Foss would go on to own several more pharmaceutical and grocery stores in the next two decades. In 1844, Foss established the Pharmaceutical Society of New South Wales with a few pharmacists based in Sydney. In 1859, Foss and his son Thomas Ambrose set up a wholesale drug store, Foss Son Company.

Foss was also a landowner. In 1833, he and his first wife purchased the Hereford House in Glebe; three years later, in 1836, he built a house called Forest Lodge (demolished 1912) after which the Sydney suburb Forest Lodge is named. In 1838, he built Carey Cottage on 18 Ferry Street, having bought land in Hunters Hill from Tawell.

== Personal life ==
Foss was a devout Christian who served as the deacon of the Pitt Street Uniting Church. He began attending the Forest Lodge Church in 1847.

Foss's first wife, Louise, died on 30 December 1852. His daughter Emily Jane Foss married astronomer Henry Chamberlain Russell in 1861. His son Thomas Ambrose, with whom he established Foss Son Company, was born in 1828 and died in 1871. Foss and his first wife had at least seven children. In 1854, he married a widow, Jane McCurdy, daughter of Bourn Russell.

Ambrose Foss died on 4 May 1862 aged 59 in Balmain, Sydney. His funeral had a modest attendance, with representatives of the Sydney Female Refuge, the Bible Society, and the Religious Tract and Book Society all present. He was buried with Louise at Rookwood Cemetery.
