= Fossa (river) =

River in Iceland

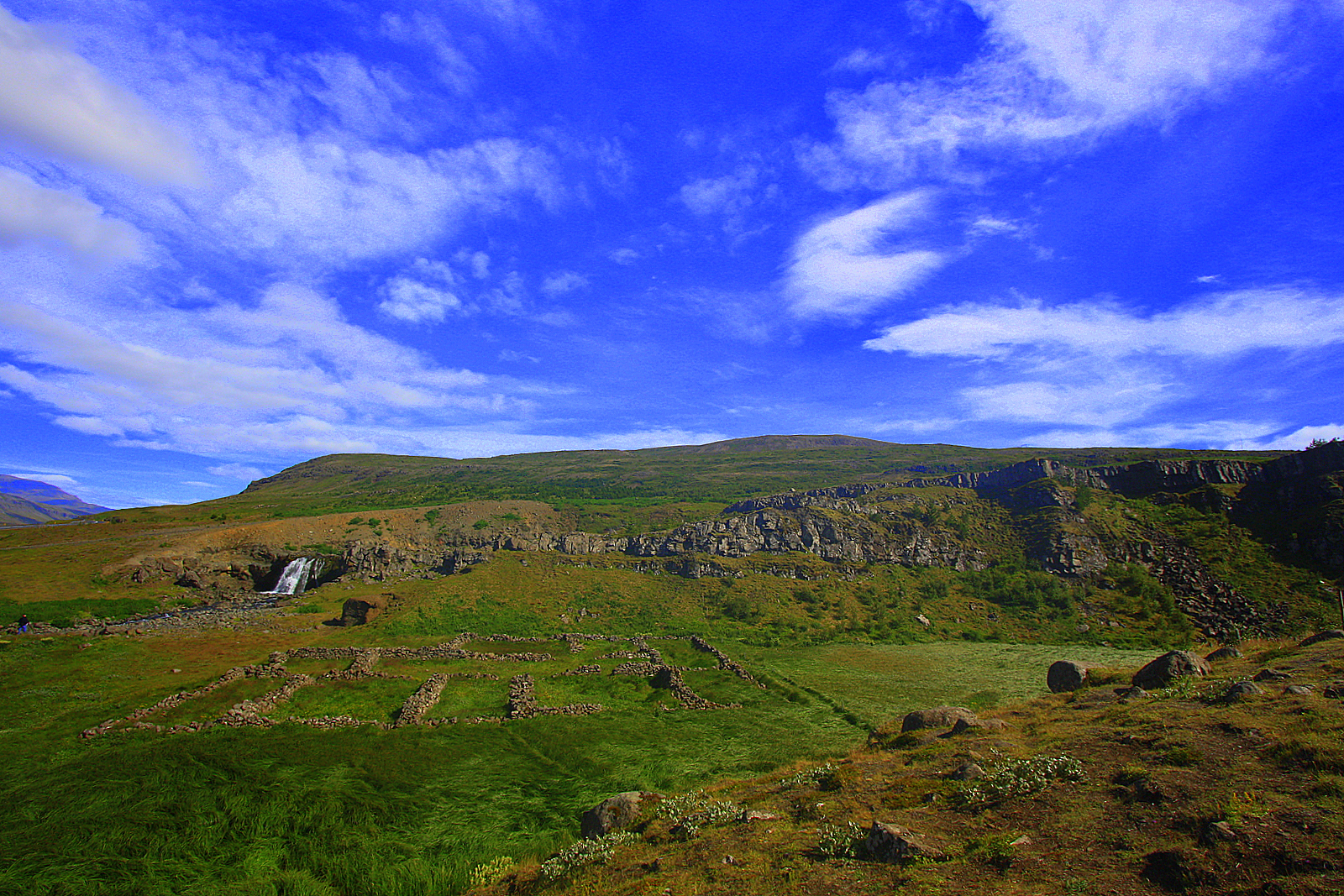
Fossá (Hvalfjörður) with an old sheep pen in Fossárdalur

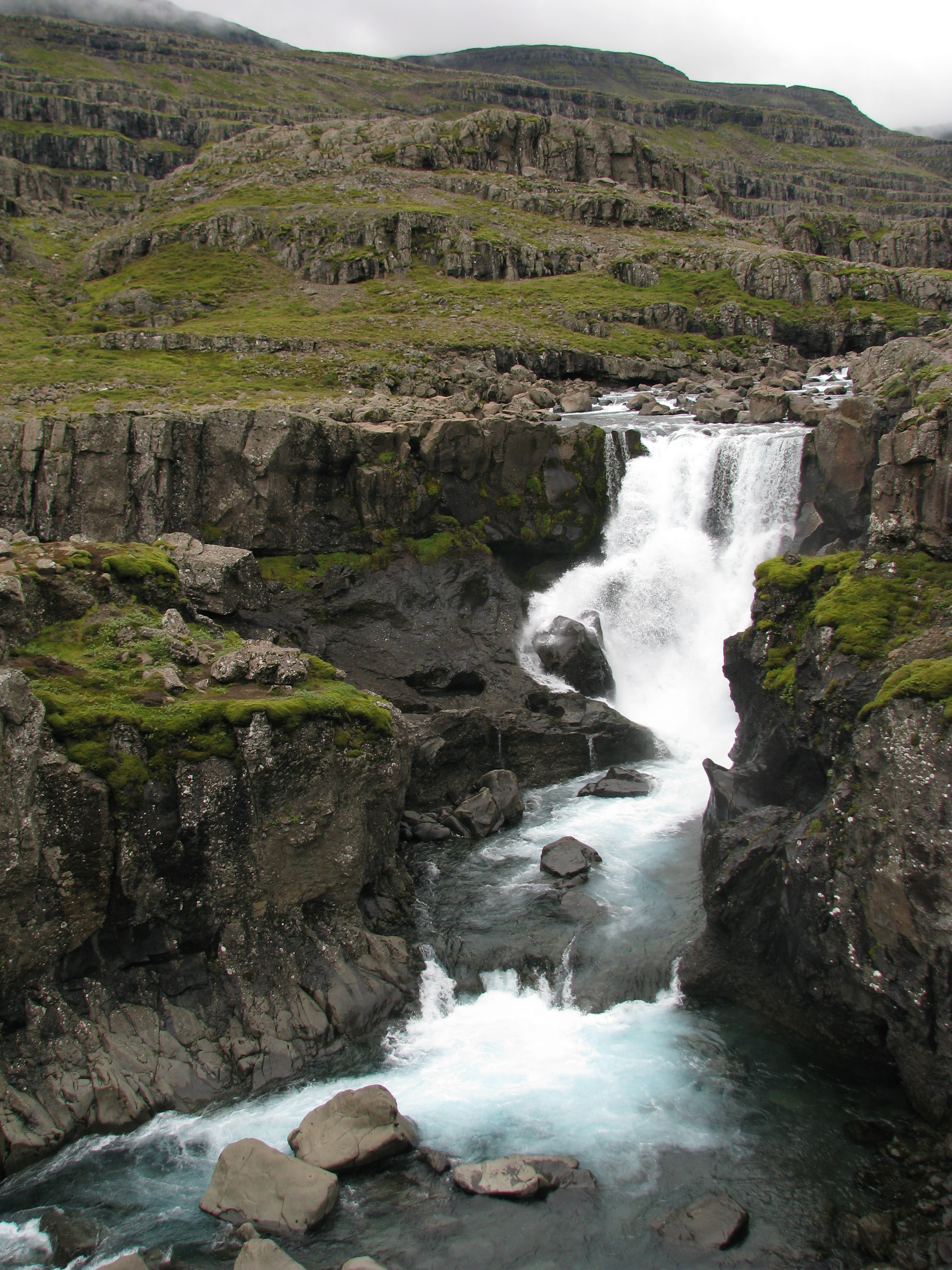
Fossá in the East Fjords (Berufjörður)

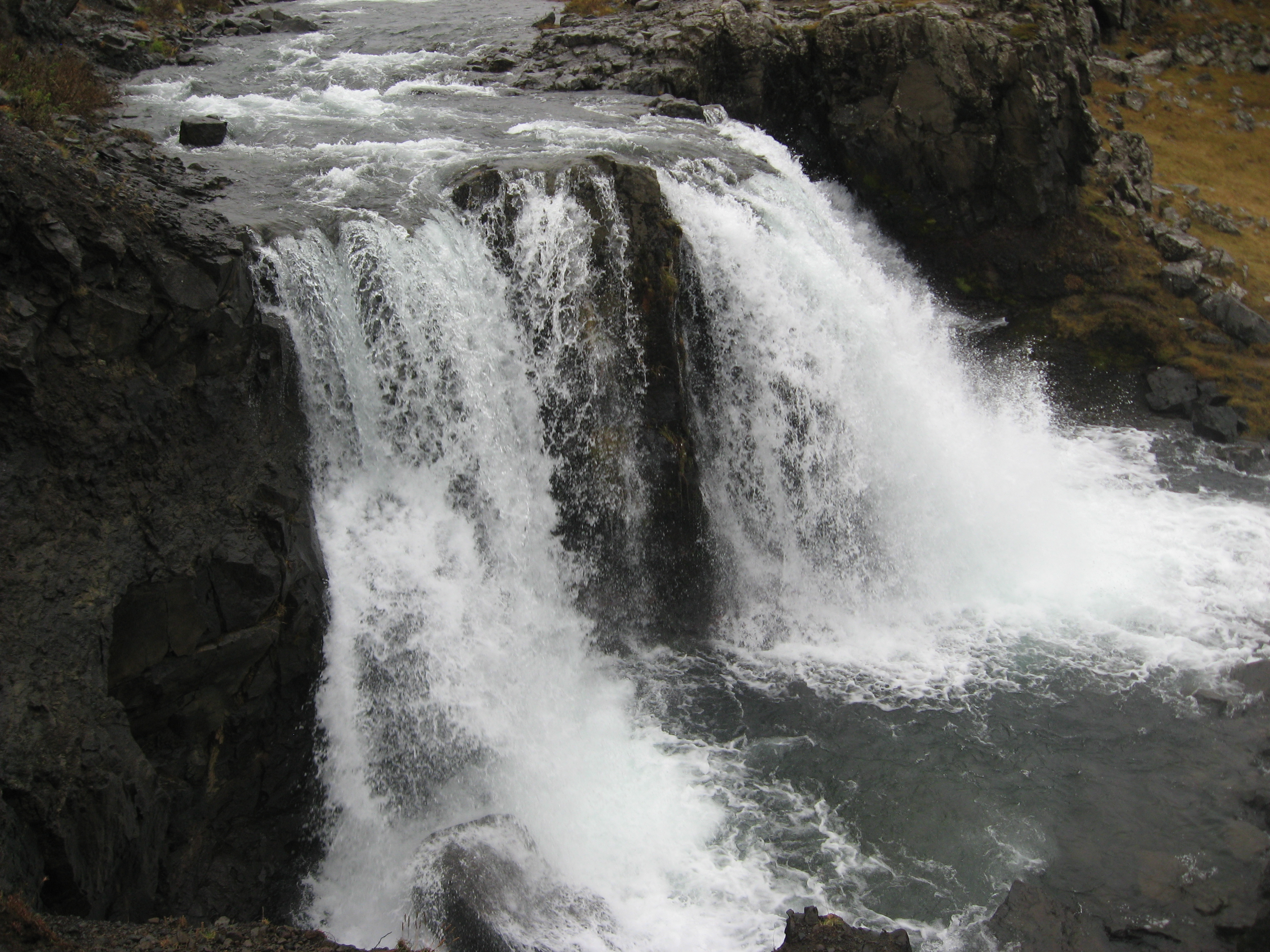
Fossá (Kjós) in October 2007

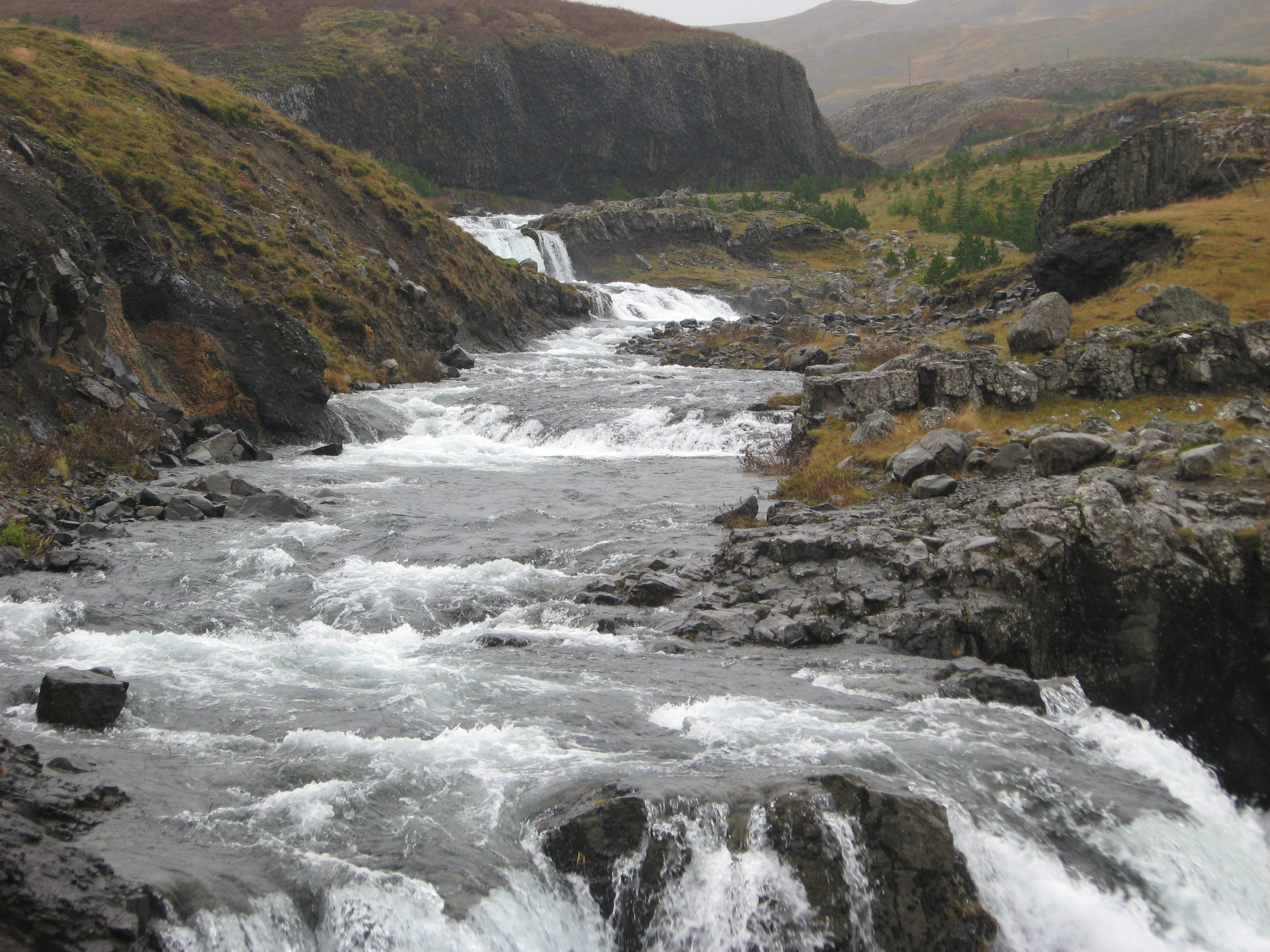
Fossá (Kjós) in October 2007

Fossá is the name of several rivers in Iceland that are known for their waterfalls. The most well-known is Fossárdalur, which runs from Þingvellir towards the southern side of Hvalfjörður. This river is characterized by numerous waterfalls, with the most popular one located near Route 47, where car parking is available.

There are other rivers in Iceland with the name Fossá, such as Fossá in Kjós and Fossá in Berufjörður, which are located in the Eastern Region (Austurland) near the fjord Berufjörður.

The term "Fossá" is derived from the Icelandic words "foss" meaning "waterfall" and "á" meaning "river." It is a common name for rivers in Iceland that feature waterfalls.

== List of Fossa rivers ==
=== Höfuðborgarsvæði Region ===
- Fossá: It is a short, right tributary of the Dælisá river, flowing from the northern slopes of the Esja mountain range.

=== Vesturland Region ===
- Fossá: It is a short stream that flows into the Breiðafjörður bay, passing through Ólafsvík.
- Fossá: It is a river that enters the Breiðafjörður bay, crossing the Route 574 east of Ólafsvík. Its sources are located on the northern side of Sandkúlar hill.
- Fossá: It is a stream that flows into Lake Reyðarvatn. Its sources are situated between the Fanntófell (893 m above sea level) and Lyklafell (845 m above sea level) hills.

=== Vestfirðir Region ===
- Fossá: It is a short stream that flows into the Breiðafjörður bay along the Barðaströnd coast.
- Fossá: It is a short stream that joins the Tröllá river and, along with several others, flows into the Syðradalsvatn lake, which then drains into the Ísafjarðardjúp fjord east of Bolungarvík.
- Fossá: It is a strong stream that originates from the small Fossavatn lake and flows into the Langá river, which in turn empties into the Skutulsfjörður fjord.
- Fossá: It is a stream that enters the Húnaflói bay, descending from the Sandfell hill (689 m above sea level).

=== Norðurland vestra Region ===
- Fossá: It is the left tributary of the Svartá river (which flows into the Blanda river and, together with it, into the Húnafjörður bay). Fossá mostly runs parallel to Svartá, joining it in the area of Route 734. The sources of this river are located on the western slopes of the Þingmannaháls hills, east of the Blöndulón reservoir.
- Fossá: It is the left tributary of the Hofsá river (which flows into the Skagafjörður bay) and merges with it in the deep Vesturdalur gorge. It originates from the northern area of the Hofsjökull glacier, on the eastern side of the Twifell mountain (1006 m above sea level).

=== Norðurland eystra Region ===
- Fossá: It is the right tributary of the Hörgá river (which flows into the Eyjafjörður bay). Fossá joins Hörgá in its lower course after crossing Route 1. The stream descends from the northern area of the Fossárjökull glacier, located west of Akureyri.

=== Austurland Region ===
- Fossá: It is a short stream that directly enters the Reyðarfjörður bay near the intersection of Routes 936 and 1. It flows from the northwest valley in the Hallberutindur mountain range.
- Fossá: It is a short stream that flows into the Stöðvará river near its mouth into the Stöðvarfjörður bay.
- Fossá: It is a river that enters the Berufjörður bay. Its source area is among the lakes and streams of Lake Líkárvatn.
- Fossá: It is the left tributary of the Fagradalsá river (which flows into the Breiðdalsvík bay). The sources of this river are located on the eastern slopes of the Mýrafellstindur peaks (972 m above sea level).
- Fossá: It is a short left tributary of the Gilsá stream in the Breiðdalsá river basin. It descends from the western slopes of the Njáll og Bera mountains (1020 m above sea level).

=== Suðurland Region ===
- Fossá: It is the right tributary of the Tungufljót river, which flows into the Kúðafljót river. Its course starts at an elevation of over 520 m above sea level, near the Gæsá-innri river and Route F233, northeast of the Mýrdalsjökull glacier. In its lower course, it bypasses the Fossárfjall hill (462 m above sea level).
- Fossá: It is the right tributary of the Þjórsá river, merging with it near Routes 32 and 3365, near the Bjarnalón lake. The Þjórsá river is connected to the Búrfellsstöð hydroelectric power station. The source of Fossá is below 700 m above sea level in the vicinity of the Helgavatn lake, neighboring the Innri-Skúmstungná valley (to the east) and the Stóra-Laxá valley (to the north). This valley is home to several waterfalls, including Hjálparfoss and Hjálparfoss.
- Fossá: It is a stream that flows into the Úlfljótsvatn lake near Route 360, passing by a camping area. Its course begins at an elevation of approximately 150 m above sea level at the base of the Úlfljótvatns-Selfjall hill (285 m above sea level).

== Sources ==
- FOSSA. BERUFJORDUR. Nordic adventure travel
- The beautiful waterfalls in Fossá river. By Regína Hrönn Ragnarsdóttir. Guide to Island
- Salmon & trout fishing area Jökla
