= Fossá =

Waterfall in the Faroe Islands

Coordinates: 62°15′04″N 7°04′39″W

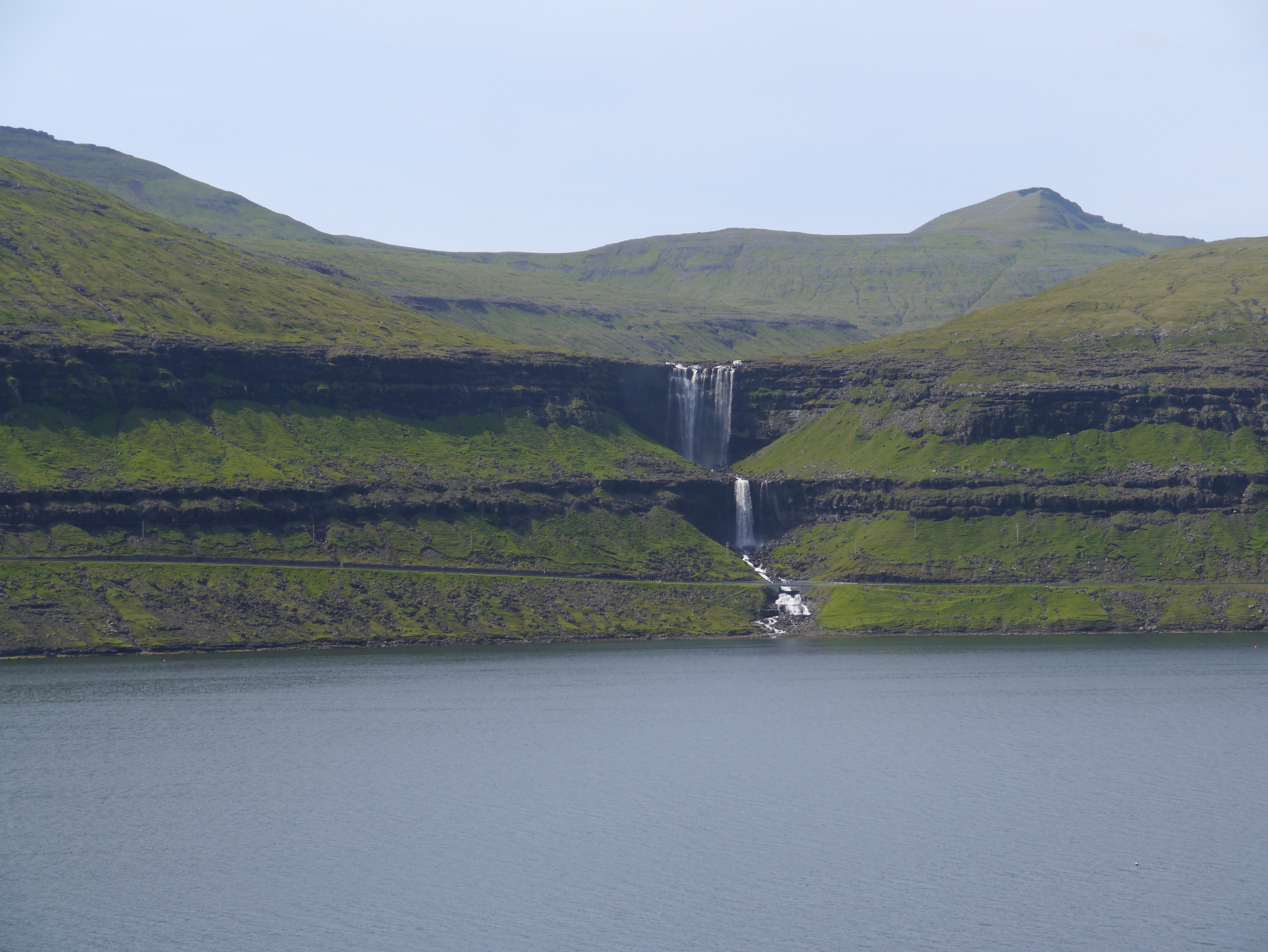
Fossá Waterfall, Streymoy island, Faroe Islands (View from Eysturoy island)

Fossurin í Fossá is one of the highest waterfalls in the Faroe Islands, and one of the biggest attractions in northern Streymoy.

"Fossá" in the Faroese language means "river with waterfalls", and there are several streams in Faroe Island with such a name.

The waterfall is located near the village of Haldarsvík, in the Sunda Kommuna municipality. It goes cascading 140 metres down to the sea in two stages.

== See also ==
- List of waterfalls
