= FOSS movement in India =

FOSS Movement in India refers to the campaign across the country during the 1990s and 2000s in particular, to promote Free and Open Source Software. It was marked by the existence of many Indian Linux User Groups (ILUGs) groups and Free Software User Groups (FSUGs) in different cities, towns and other areas.

The prominent members of the campaign include the late Atul Chitnis, Prof Nagarjuna G. and others.

== Timeline of the campaign ==
Date	Event
1990s	Computer magazines like PC-Quest boost interest in FOSS (or Linux) by regularly writing articles, and sharing software on CDs and DVDs from this field. Among the early writers are the late Atul Chitnis.
1993-94	The not-for-profit/NGO Centre for Education and Documentation, based at Bombay (now Mumbai) and Bangalore (now Bengaluru) promotes the use of FOSS (or Linux, as it was then widely called) among the non-profit and alternate journalist community, through installing it on their computers, in its rather early shape. CED also used some FOSS tools while granting early access to non-profits to their email systems at ILBOM and ILBAN (IndiaLink) service.
1997	Linux India, a loose network of mailing lists is founded around this time by Arun Sharma and Karra Dakshinamurthy to help propagate and learn the Linux operating system and associated tools. In the early days, the electronic mailing lists were under the adminship of Sudhakar Chandrasekharan aka Thaths.
2013	October: Free Software Foundation (India) responds to the proposed Government of India framework. Urges government to recognise citizens as primary stakeholders; seeks replacement of "OSS" with "FLOSS"; and other concerns over the total cost of ownership, bidding to create FLOSS solutions, licenses, recommended stacks, etc.
