= Levi Foss House =

Historic house in Maine, United States

- U.S. National Register of Historic Places
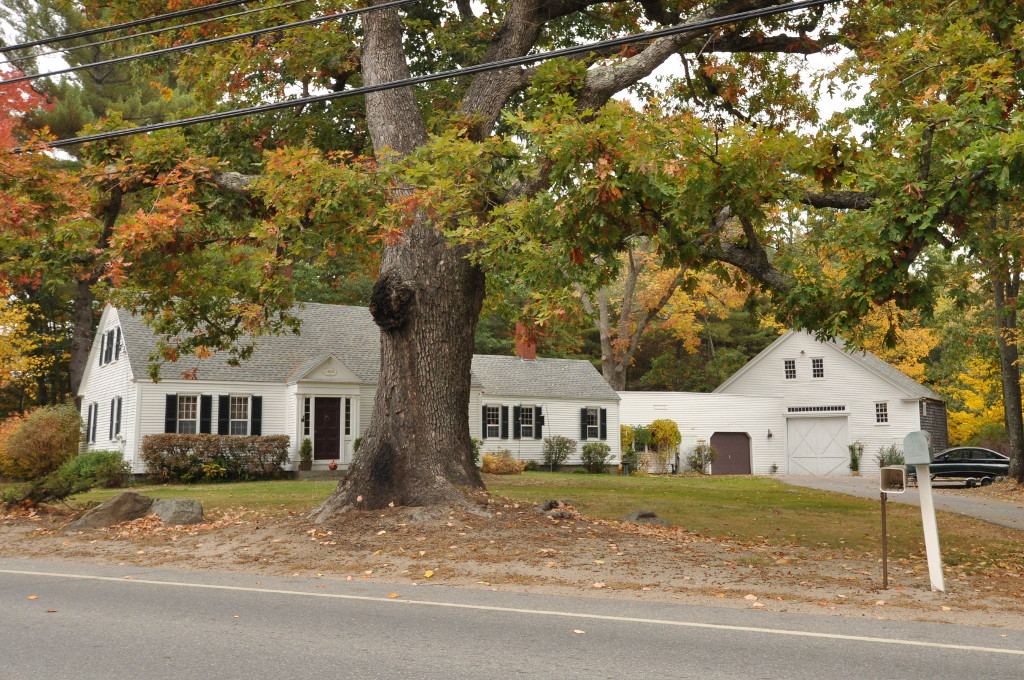

- Location within Maine Location within the United States
- Location: ME 35, Goodwins Mills (Dayton side), Maine
- Coordinates: 43°30′40″N 70°34′54.4″W
- Area: 0.5 acres (0.20 ha)
- Built: 1815
- NRHP reference No.: 84001550
- Added to NRHP: March 22, 1984

The Levi Foss House is a historic house on Maine State Route 35 (Goodwins Mills Road) on the Dayton side of the village of Goodwins Mills, Maine. Built about 1815, it is a well-preserved example of an early 19th-century connected farmstead with Federal and Greek Revival styling. It was listed on the National Register of Historic Places in 1984.

== Description and history ==
The Levi Foss House is located on the north side of Maine State Route 35, a few houses north of its junction with Waterhouse Road. It is located in the town of Dayton, but on the fringe of the village of Goodwins Mills, most of which is in neighboring Lyman. The main house is a 1 1/2-story Cape style wood-frame structure, five bays wide, with a side gable roof, central chimney, and clapboard siding. Ells extending to the right (east) join the house to its barn, the entire complex forming an L shape. The entry of the house is in a projecting gable-roofed enclosed vestibule, which features a detailed Greek Revival surround including sidelight windows, pilasters, and a full gable pediment. Exterior Greek Revival details are also evident on the barn, whose gable ends have full returns, although most of the remaining trim is Federal. Interior trim is predominantly Greek Revival in style, although the front winding staircase retains Federal period newel posts and handrail.

The main house was built about 1815, and would originally have had Federal period styling. There is some evidence that one of the ells may be older than the main house, but this has not been confirmed. The house was extensively restyled sometime after the Greek Revival came into vogue in the 1820s. Except for modest modernizations of the interior in the 20th century, the building has been little altered.

== See also ==
- National Register of Historic Places listings in York County, Maine
