= Fösse =

River in Germany

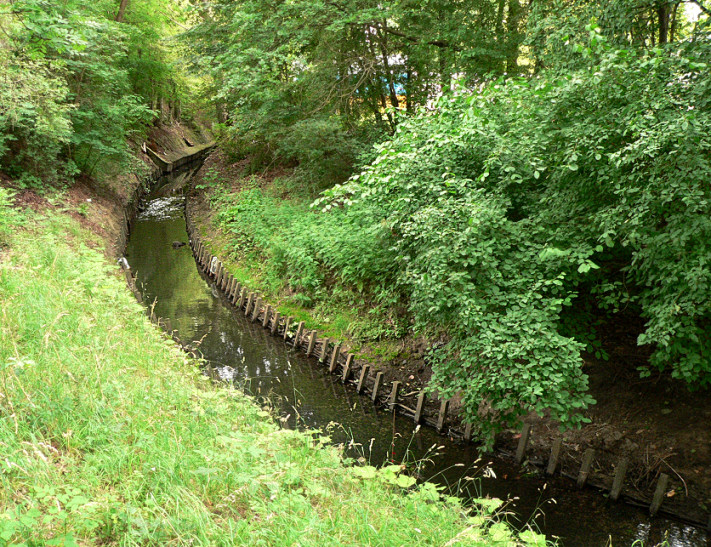
- The Fösse with fascines in a canalized course in Hanover

Location
- Country: Germany
- State: Lower Saxony

Physical characteristics
- Source
  - elevation: 65 metres (213 ft)
- Mouth
  - location: Leine
  - coordinates: 52.3785°N 9.6931°E
  - elevation: 53 metres (174 ft)
- Length: 8 km (5.0 mi)
- Basin size: 20 km^{2} (7.7 sq mi)

Basin features
- Progression: Leine→ Aller→ Weser→ North Sea
- River system: Weser

Fösse is a small river of Lower Saxony, Germany. It flows into the Leine west of Hanover.

== Environment ==
Much of the stream is channeled in the city of Hanover, where the water flows deeper in places and is piped and hidden in the green. A small water treading area has been integrated into the stream here since May 2014.

== See also ==
- List of rivers of Lower Saxony

== General references ==
- Klaus Mlynek; Waldemar R. Röhrbein, eds. (2009). "Fösse". Hannover City Lexicon. From the beginnings into the present (in German). Hanover: Schlütersche Verlagsgesellschaft. p. 185. OCLC 458691668. OL 45212542M. Wikidata Q2327579.
