= Foss House (New Brighton, Minnesota) =

Historic house in Minnesota, United States

- U.S. National Register of Historic Places
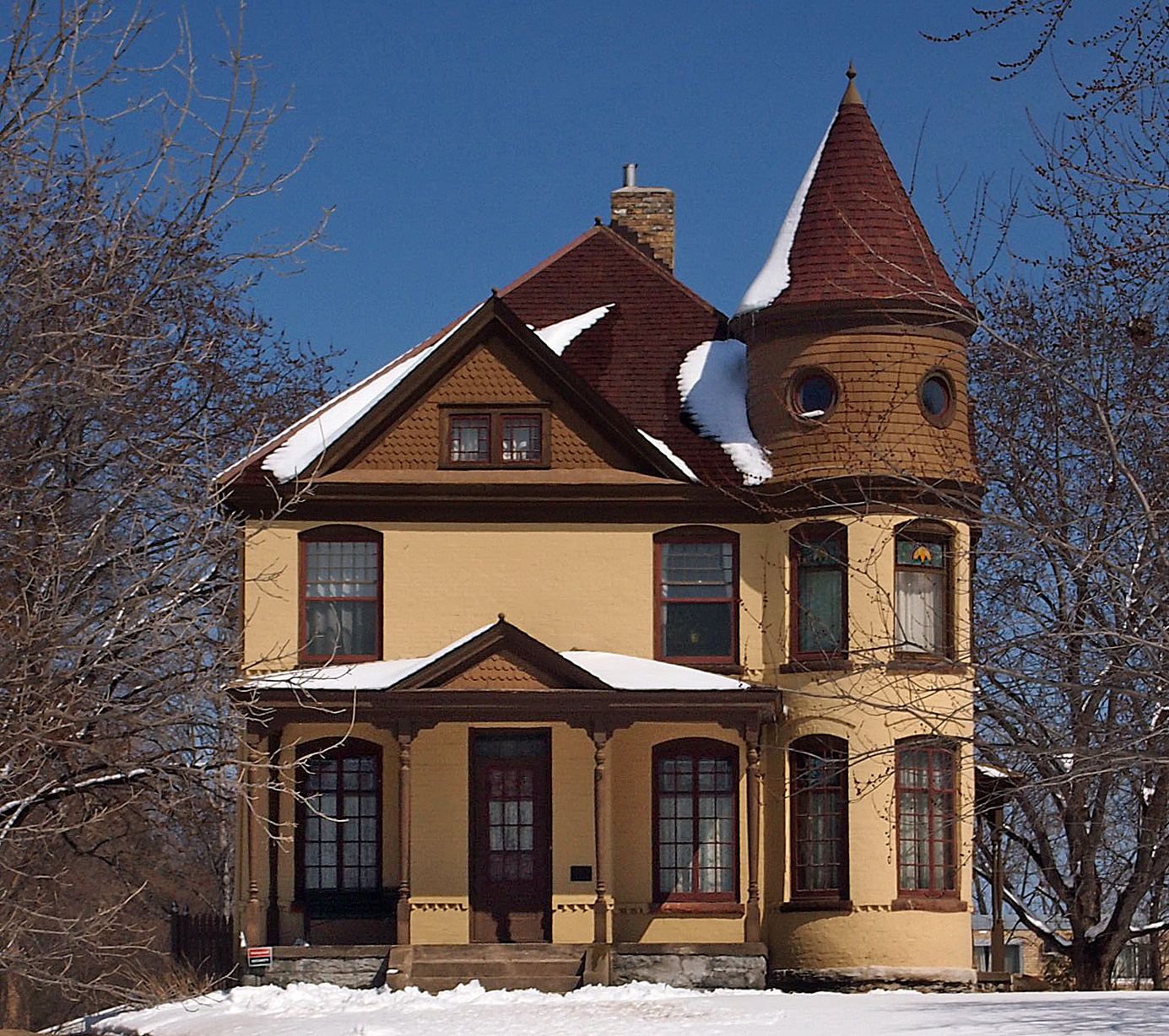
- The Foss House from the west

- Location within Minnesota Location within the United States
- Location: 321 Silver Lake Road, New Brighton, Minnesota
- Coordinates: 45°2′40″N 93°13′2″W
- Area: Less than 1 acre
- Built: c. 1896
- Architectural style: Late Victorian
- NRHP reference No.: 83000931
- Added to NRHP: May 19, 1983

The Foss House is a home in New Brighton, Minnesota, United States, built by Ingeborg and Peder Foss. It is a large 1896 Victorian house featuring a corner tower. It is listed on the National Register of Historic Places.
