= Foss and Wells House =

Historic house in Minnesota, United States

- U.S. National Register of Historic Places
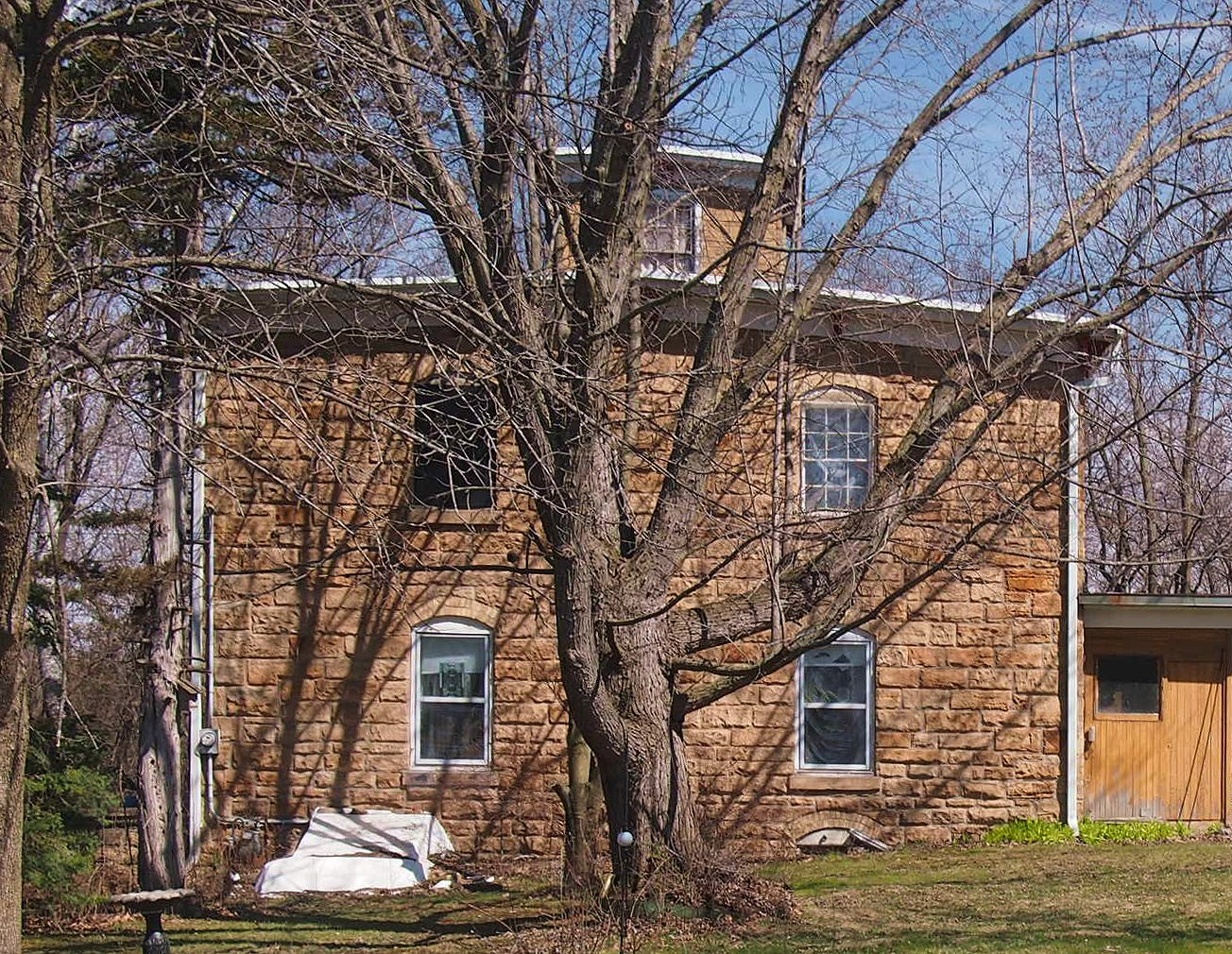
- The Foss and Wells House from the west

- Location within Minnesota Location within the United States
- Location: 613 S. Broadway Street, Jordan, Minnesota
- Coordinates: 44°39′23.5″N 93°37′36″W
- Area: 1.72 acres (0.70 ha)
- Built: 1858
- Architectural style: Italianate
- MPS: Scott County MRA
- NRHP reference No.: 80002161
- Added to NRHP: April 17, 1980

The Foss and Wells House is a historic house in Jordan, Minnesota, United States. It was built 1858 and was jointly inhabited by the two families that owned a nearby gristmill. The property was listed on the National Register of Historic Places in 1980 for its significance in the themes of architecture, commerce, exploration/settlement, and industry. It was nominated for its association with Jordan's early milling industry and for its distinctive Italianate architecture in stone.

== Description ==
The Foss and Wells House stands on a bluff overlooking Sand Creek to the north. It is two stories with a cupola. The house is built of irregular sandstone ashlars. Elements of Italianate style include the cubical massing, shallow pitched roof, cupola, bracketed cornice, and arched window and door lintels. A nearby outbuilding has similar stone architecture.

The house originally had a second-story balcony and three chimneys, all of which have been removed. A one-story frame garage was added to the south side of the house in the 1930s.

== History ==
The house was built in 1858 for Edwin and James Foss and Rufus Wells, who jointly owned a water-powered gristmill down the hill on Sand Creek. The city of Jordan had recently been platted, and it developed quickly over the next two decades as an important regional wheat-milling center. The Foss and Wells families lived together in the house until 1890. It was acquired by a new family in 1911 and was still owned by them at the time of the property's National Register nomination in 1980.

== See also ==
- National Register of Historic Places listings in Scott County, Minnesota
