= Philomena (given name) =

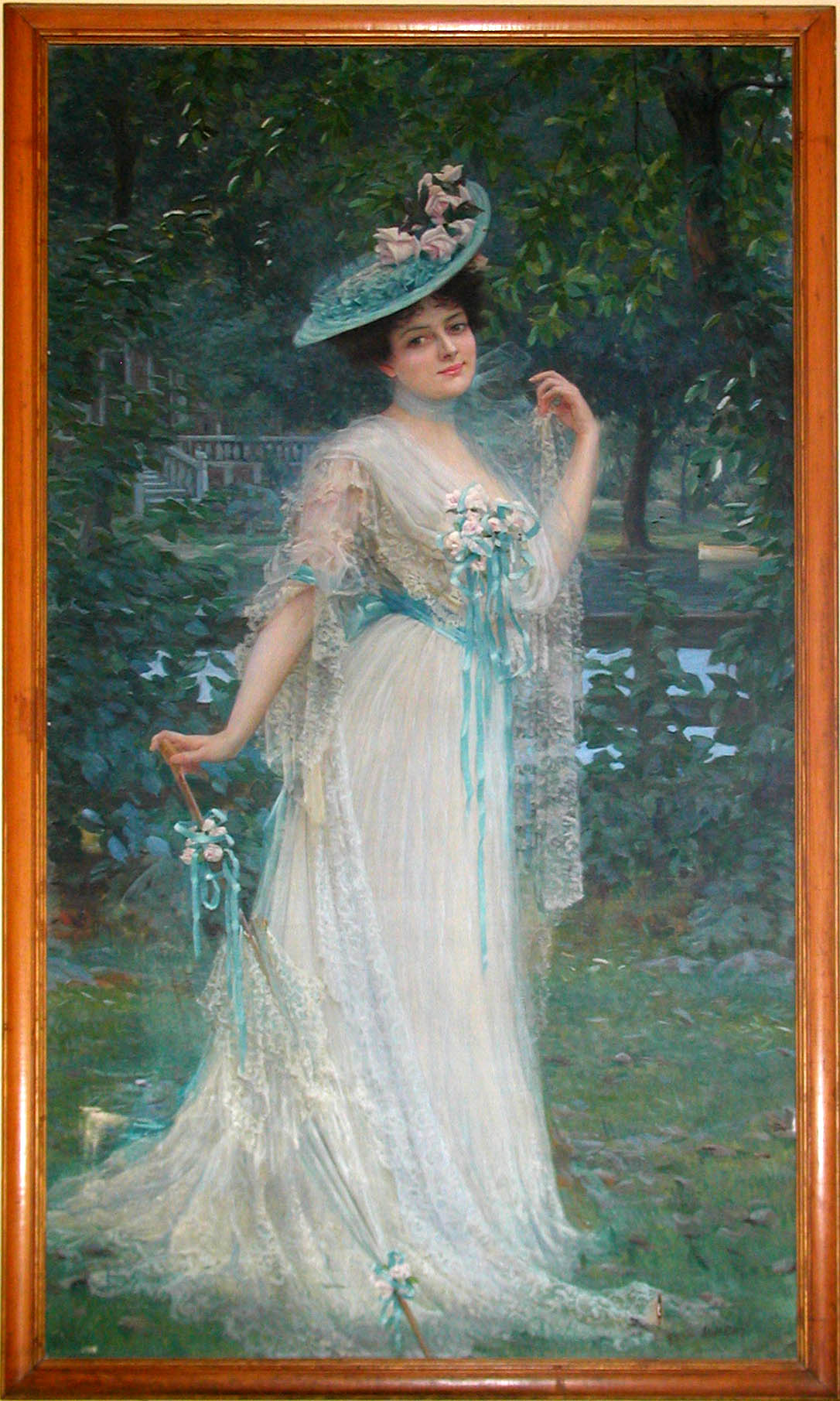
Photograph of the portrait of Phylomena Lynch taken by Paul Jobert

Philomena was a young woman believed by some to have been a Christian martyr.

Other people named Philomena include:

- Petrus de Dacia (mathematician), 13th-century Danish mathematician also called Philomena
- Philomena Begley (born 1950), Irish country music singer
- Philomena Essed (born 1955), Dutch-born professor of race, gender and leadership studies
- Philomena Garvey (1926–2009), Irish golfer
- Philomena Gianfrancisco (1923–1992), outfielder in the All-American Girls Professional Baseball League
- Philomena Lee (born 1933), Irish nurse forced to give up her baby for adoption
- Philomena Mantella, American university administrator
- Philomena McDonagh, English actress and writer
- Philomena Mensah (born 1975), Canadian sprinter
- Philomena Muinzer, dramaturge and former musician

== In fiction ==
- Philomena Cunk, a dim-witted British interviewer and commentator portrayed by Diane Morgan

== See also ==
- Filomena, a variant form of Philomena
- Philomène
- Philomina, a Malayalam film actress
