= Filomena =

- Pronunciation: fee-lo-ME-nah
- Gender: Female
- Language: Italian, Spanish, Portuguese, Dutch

Origin
- Meaning: friend of strength

Other names
- See also: Philomena

Filomena is a form of the Greek female given name Philomena. It means "friend of strength" (φίλος : phílos "friend, lover" and μένος : ménos "mind, purpose, strength, courage") or "loved one" (φιλουμένη : philouménē meaning "loved"). Filomena is the name of one of the storytellers in the frame story of The Decameron.

== People with the name Filomena ==
- Filomena Barros Dos Reis, East Timorese activist
- Filomena Campus, Italian singer
- Filomena Cautela, Portuguese presenter
- Filomena Costa, Portuguese runner
- Filomena Dato, Spanish writer
- Filomena Delli Castelli, Italian politician
- Filomena Embaló, Bissau-Guinean writer
- Filomena Fortes, Cape Verdean sports administrator and handball player
- Filomena Linčiūtė-Vaitiekūnienė, Lithuanian artist
- Filomena Margaiz, Mexican politician
- Filomena Moretti, Italian guitarist
- Filomena Rotiroti, Canadian politician
- Filomena Tassi, Canadian politician
- Filomena Mascarenhas Tipote, Bissau-Guinean politician
- Filomena Trindade, Angolan handball player
- Filomena Valenzuela Goyenechea, Chilean soldier

== See also ==
- Philomena (given name)
- Storm Filomena
- Filomena (disambiguation)
- Diane Morgan
