= Santa Filomena =

Santa Filomena (Portuguese and Spanish for Saint Philomena) may refer to:

Brazil:

- Santa Filomena, Pernambuco
- Santa Filomena, Piauí
- Santa Filomena do Maranhão

Italy:

- Santa Filomena (Mosciano Sant'angelo)

Philippines:

- Santa Filomena, a barangay of Iligan

== See also ==
- Filomena (disambiguation)
