= Gendered racism =

Form of oppression that occurs due to race and gender

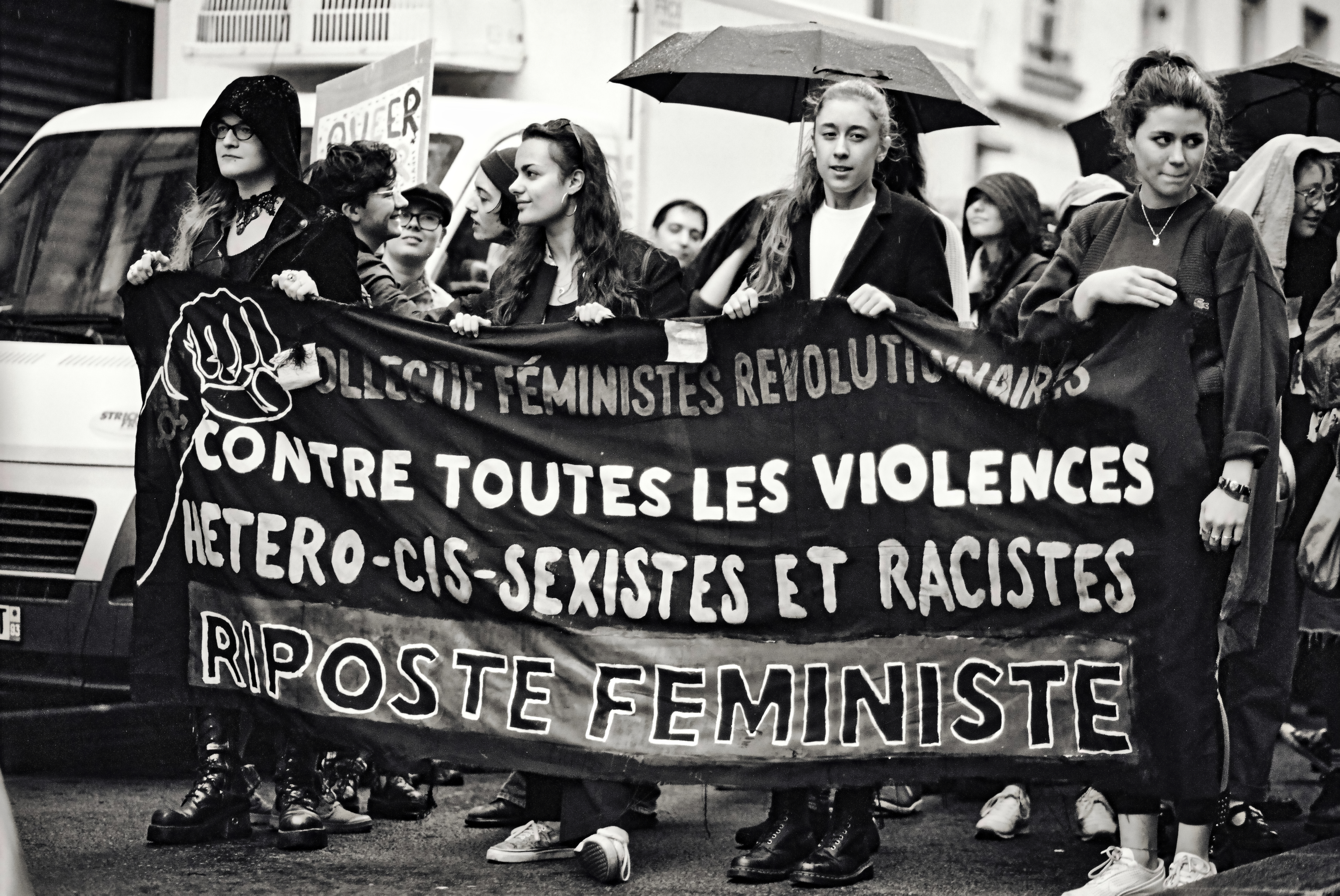
Trans march with banner reading "Collective feminist revolutionaries against all hetrocissexist and racist violence" from Paris, 2017

Gendered racism is a form of oppression that occurs due to race and gender. It is perpetuated due to the prevalence of perceptions, stereotypes, and images of certain groups. Racism functions as a way to distinguish races as inferior or superior to one another. "Sexism" is defined as prejudice, stereotyping, or discrimination on the basis of sex. Gendered racism differs in that it pertains specifically to racial and ethnic understandings of masculinity and femininity, as well as along gendered forms of race and ethnic discrimination.

Fundamentally, age, class, and gender are intersecting categories of experience that affect all aspects of human life. Thus, they simultaneously structure the experiences of all people in society. At any moment, race, class, or gender may feel more salient or meaningful in a given person's life, but they are overlapping and cumulative in their effects on people's experiences. This emphasizes that it is difficult for an individual to differentiate which aspect of their identity is being attacked. It may be impossible for an individual to assess whether discrimination is due to gender or race. Both of these constructs make up the individual's identity, and they intersect with one another. Because people have intersecting social identities, it is important to focus on how these identities shape an individual's experiences.

== Origin ==
The term gendered racism was originally coined by sociologist Philomena Essed, and refers to the simultaneous experience of both racism and sexism. According to Essed, racism and sexism "intertwine and combine under certain conditions into one hybrid phenomenon".

== Coping ==
As a means of coping, African American women relied heavily on the support of the black community. They also coped by overachieving or being overly successful, and thinking positively. Research demonstrated that the coping mechanisms employed by African American women were not always beneficial because they heightened distress rather than decrease it. Possible ways to cope with gendered racism include education, in which African American women are provided with a space to openly discuss their experiences and develop strategies to better handle situations when they are being discriminated against. Another research experiment was conducted in order to assess how black female college students cope with gendered racial microaggressions. Microaggressions are the everyday verbal, nonverbal, and environmental slights, snubs, or insults, whether intentional or unintentional, which communicate hostile, derogatory, or negative messages to target persons based solely upon their marginalized group membership.

The results from these focus groups showed that there were five coping strategies employed: two resistance coping strategies, one collective coping strategy, and two self-protective coping strategies. The two resistance coping strategies were using one's voice as power and resisting Eurocentric standards. When Black women use their voice as power they are actively speaking up and addressing the microaggressions in order to assert power in the situation. In order to resist Eurocentric standards black women are compelled to shy away from the traditional standards of beauty as well as dominant ideologies held by the larger society.

The collective coping strategy proved to be leaning on one's support networks in which individuals find solace through interactions with friends and family. The women who utilized this coping strategy spoke about the comfort they found in having support from other women who had similar experiences. The two self-protective coping strategies used were becoming a Superwoman of sorts and becoming desensitized and escaping. Self-protective coping involves strategies that are used to minimize the stressful effect of gendered microaggressions. Black women who cope by becoming a Black Superwoman take on multiple roles to demonstrate their strength and resilience. Other women cope by becoming desensitized and escaping, which involves downplaying the seriousness of the situation and attempting to find a way out.

== See also ==
- Racism
- Sexism
- Stereotypes
- Intersectionality
- Misogynoir
