= Lucro Sucio; Los Ojos del Vacio =

Studio album by the Mars Volta
- Released: April 11, 2025
- Genres: Psychedelic rock, art rock, folk rock, experimental rock
- Length: 49:28
- Label: Clouds Hill
- Producer: Omar Rodríguez-López

The Mars Volta chronology
Que Dios Te Maldiga Mi Corazón (2023)	Lucro Sucio; Los Ojos del Vacio (2025)	Lucro Sucio; Unfinished Business (2026)

The Mars Volta studio albums chronology
Que Dios Te Maldiga Mi Corazón (2023)	Lucro Sucio (2025)	TBA (2027)

Lucro Sucio; Los Ojos del Vacio (Spanish for 'Filthy Lucre; The Eyes of the Void') is the ninth studio album (eighth of new material, yet labeled as II on the CD data) by the American progressive rock band The Mars Volta, released on April 11, 2025, on Clouds Hill Records. Produced by Omar Rodríguez-López and mixed and engineered by Marcel Rodríguez-López, the album is the first to feature drummer Linda-Philomène Tsoungui and bass guitarist Josh Moreau, both of whom joined the band in 2022 to tour in support of the band's eponymous album and its acoustic re-recording, Que Dios Te Maldiga Mi Corazón (2023). The album marks the return of former collaborator John Frusciante as an engineer for the album.

The band eschewed a traditional press cycle for the album, giving no interviews prior to its release. Instead, the band performed the album in full each night during their March–April 2025 arena tour in support of Deftones. The band continued to perform the album in full during their October–November North American tour.

A live version of the album, Lucro Sucio; Unfinished Business, will be released on November 20, 2026, with Rodríguez-López describing it as "the definitive version of Lucro Sucio."

== Artwork ==
The album's artwork, by Adán Guevara, features a mysterious map, designed as a puzzle for fans to solve. Following the album's release, Johann Scheerer, who runs the band's label, Clouds Hill Records, stated: "At first glance, the cover of The Mars Volta’s ninth studio album Lucro Sucio; Los Ojos del Vacío might seem abstract, but nothing on it is random. Some details reveal themselves right away. Others, you’ll have to feel. This isn’t just a cover - it’s something to explore. What do you see?"

The physical album release consists of a completely blank, brown cardboard front cover. The album artwork as seen on the digital release is included separately, as a folded map included with the CD, and a larger embossed/debossed version of the map included with the vinyl.

== Release ==
Lucro sucio; Los ojos del vacio was released on April 11, 2025, by Clouds Hill Records. The album was leaked online two months prior to being officially announced, with the leaked track lengths being different than the official version. As the band and the record label did not initially confirm or deny the existence of a forthcoming album, or that the album had in fact leaked, rumors as to its veracity spread. These rumors were confirmed on February 25, 2025, when the band debuted the unannounced album in its entirety while opening for Deftones on their 2025 North American Tour. Vocalist Teri Gender Bender joined the band on stage for this tour, providing backing vocals for the live performances, though her vocals are not present on the studio recording. The band solely played the contents of the new album, defying expectations that they might include tracks from their prior album releases. In March 2025, further speculation arose when a food delivery driver claimed on Reddit that Cedric Bixler-Zavala had given him a CD-R copy of the album for free. The contents of that CD-R were later confirmed to be an exact match to the official release.

In the days prior to the album's release, Clouds Hill described the album as "[an] atmospheric and moody release [which] sees Omar Rodríguez-López and Cedric Bixler-Zavala revisiting their roots while continuing to reinvent themselves. The album blends their signature sound with jazz and electronica influences, celebrating their origins while pushing forward with fresh innovations - a musical journey that's both nostalgic and new." The fifth track, 'The Iron Rose', was originally titled 'Nefilibata' in the initial leak, but the title was changed by Bixler-Zavala in advance of the album's debut.

Upon the release of the record, The Mars Volta announced a North American tour in support of the release. During this tour in the fall of 2025, the band performed a more elaborate version of the album, with improvisational sections extending the length by 20-30 minutes on any given night.

== Reception ==
Professional ratings
Review scores
Source	Rating
Kerrang!	2/5 stars
Sputnikmusic	3.9/5

The album has been described as "dreamlike, ethereally beautiful art rock." It was rated unfavorably by Kerrang! who described it as "arty indulgence and irksome jazz." While the online magazine recognizes the originality and spontaneity of the album, they ultimately deem it "twiddly silliness" rather than actual substance. However, they do compliment the vocals in Mictlán and The Iron Rose and the song Vociferó overall.

Sputnikmusic was more favorable to Lucro Sucio, and described the album as a "fever dream with excellent production and pristine execution." The site mentions the sensibility and lethargy of the record and while not delineating that as a negative or positive, they lament the absence of the band's original sound. Furthermore, Sputnik praised the melodies of Bixler-Zavala, the song transitions, and the Latin music roots.

The Progressive Subway gave plaudits to the album and described it as ethereal, surrealist, ambient, and tranquil, while also likening it to "traversing a trepidatious and vast steppe that gets intermittently swallowed in psychedelia."

== Track listing ==
All lyrics are written by Cedric Bixler-Zavala; all music is composed by Omar Rodríguez-López.

No.	Title	Length
1.	"Fin"	1:14
2.	"Reina Tormenta"	1:10
3.	"Enlazan las Tinieblas"	3:12
4.	"Mictlán"	2:33
5.	"The Iron Rose"	3:48
6.	"Cue the Sun"	2:16
7.	"Alba del Orate"	3:12
8.	"Voice in My Knives"	2:41
9.	"Poseedora de Mi Sombra"	2:47
10.	"Celaje"	3:48
11.	"Vociferó"	2:28
12.	"Mito de los Trece Cielos"	1:05
13.	"Un Disparo al Vacío"	3:31
14.	"Detrás de la Puerta Dorada"	0:29
15.	"Maullidos"	2:56
16.	"Morgana"	3:05
17.	"Cue the Sun (Reprise)"	3:29
18.	"Lucro Sucio"	5:44
Total length:		49:28

=== Notes ===
- The successive words following the first word of each song are stylized in lowercase, with the exception of track 5, The Iron Rose, which is all capitalized.
- "Lucro Sucio" is based on Omar Rodriguez-Lopez's solo piece "Civil War Chocolates", originally released on the album Gorilla Preacher Cartel in 2017.
- Tracks 2 & 3, 4 & 5, 6 & 7, 8 & 9, and 16 & 17 form single pieces.

== Personnel ==
=== The Mars Volta ===
- Omar Rodríguez-López – synths, guitars
- Cedric Bixler-Zavala – vocals
- Marcel Rodríguez-López – synths, keyboards, percussion
- Linda-Philomène Tsoungui – drums
- Leo Genovese – keyboards, saxophone
- Josh Moreau – bass guitar

=== Additional musicians ===
- Daniel Diaz – percussion
- Eva Gardner – bass guitar
- Willy Rodriguez – drums

=== Technical ===
- Omar Rodríguez-López – production, engineering
- Marcel Rodríguez-López – engineering, mixing
- Jon Debaun – engineering
- Chris Common – engineering, mastering
- John Frusciante – engineering
