= Philomène =

Philomène is a given name, Philomena. Notable people with the name include:

- Philomène Omatuku Atshakawo Akatshi, Democratic Republic of the Congo politician
- Philomène Bassek (born 1957), Cameroonian author
- Philomène Belliveau (1854–1940), Canadian artist
- Philomène Daniels (1843–1929), Canadian-born steamboat captain
- Philomène Grandin (born 1974), Swedish actress
- Philomene Long (1940–2007), American poet
- Philomene Magers (born 1965), German art dealer
- Linda-Philomène Tsoungui (born 1992), German drummer
