= Josh Moreau =

American bassist (born 1981)

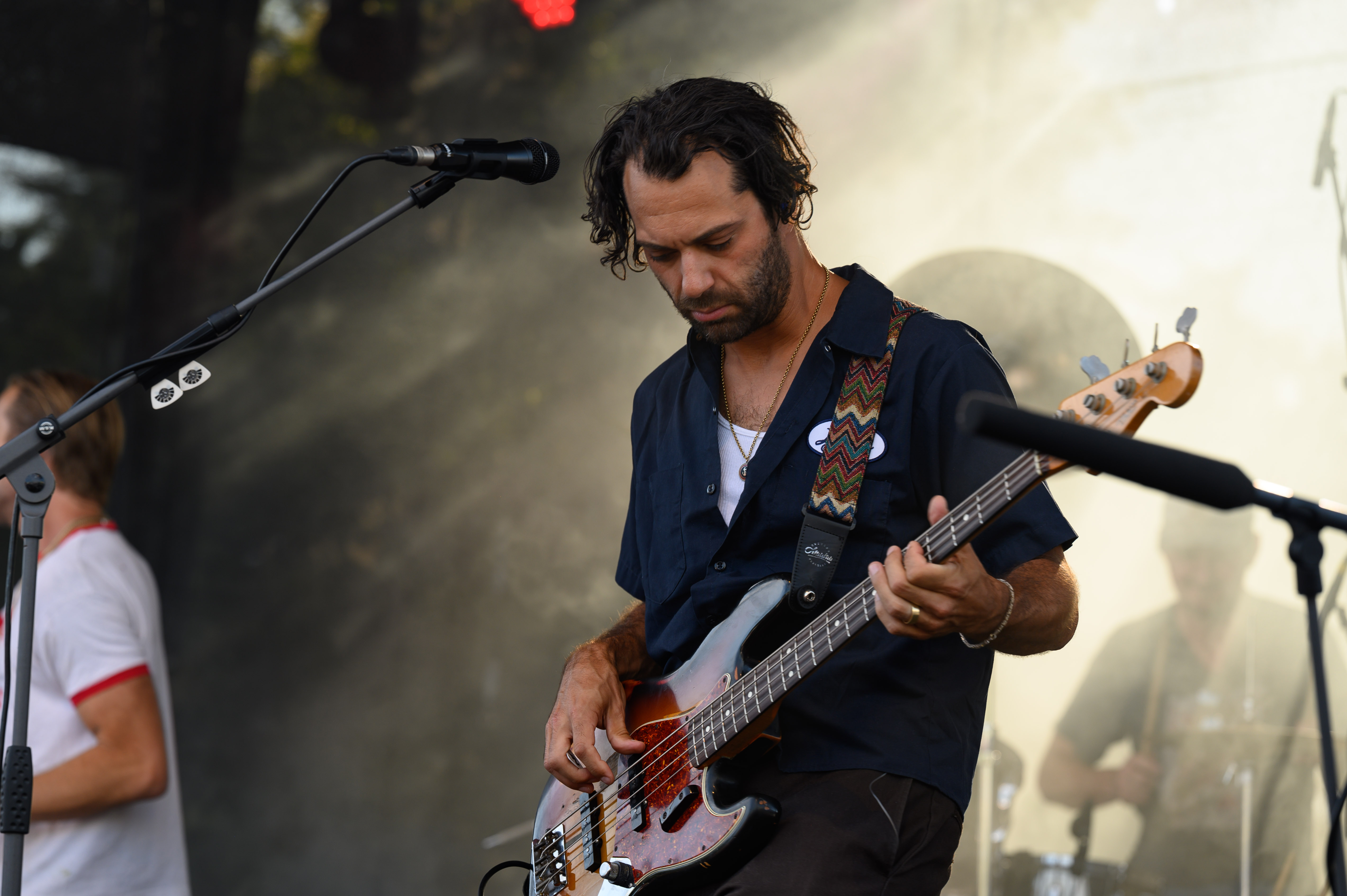
- Moreau performing with Awolnation in 2025

Background information
- Born: Joshua Moreau
- Origin: United States
- Genres: Pop rock; alternative rock; progressive rock
- Occupation: Bassist

Joshua Moreau (born 1981) is an American bassist based in California. Known primarily as a touring and session bassist, he has worked with Hoobastank, The Mars Volta, Puscifer, Awolnation, Katy Perry, Miley Cyrus, Billy Ray Cyrus, Under the Influence of Giants, Shakira, Carina Round, and Lana Del Rey.

== Career ==
Moreau has mainly worked as a touring and session bassist, collaborating with a number of artists. His first professional work was in 1999, when Paul Shaffer asked him to join the Nickelodeon House Band. He was hired by Sheila E. to perform with Nelly Furtado and Juanes shortly thereafter.

Moreau was hired by Hoobastank in 2006 as their touring bassist and remained with them until 2008.

He was the touring bassist for Katy Perry from 2008 to 2019, contributing to the 2017 album Witness.

He has toured with Miley Cyrus and was featured in the 2023 documentary concert special Endless Summer Vacation (Backyard Sessions).

Moreau joined the band Awolnation in 2020 and contributed to their fourth studio album Angel Miners & the Lightning Riders.

He was hired by The Mars Volta in September 2022 after Eva Gardner left to tour with Pink. He would remain with the band until 2025 when Gardner rejoined during their headlining tour that year. Moreau contributed to the band's ninth studio album Lucro Sucio; Los Ojos Del Vacio and performed the album in full during The Mars Volta's opening tour for Deftones also in 2025.

In 2022, Moreau filled in for Puscifer bassist Greg Edwards during the first leg of the Existential Reckoning tour while performing bass and synths. He rejoined Puscifer for the 2025 and 2026 tours and is featured in the Puscifer concert film Normal Isn't: Live at the Pacific Stock Exchange and the "Self Evident"and "Pendulum" music videos featuring footage from the performance.

Moreau has also worked with Billy Ray Cyrus, Under the Influence of Giants, Shakira, Carina Round, Lana Del Rey, Tony Royster Jr., Curt Bisquera, Rob Hoffman, Kevin Max, Something Like Silas, Tim Myers, The Knux, The Symetrics, Timmy Curran, 3OH!3, Debbie Lurie, Hailee Steinfeld, Lissie, and Adam Lambert.

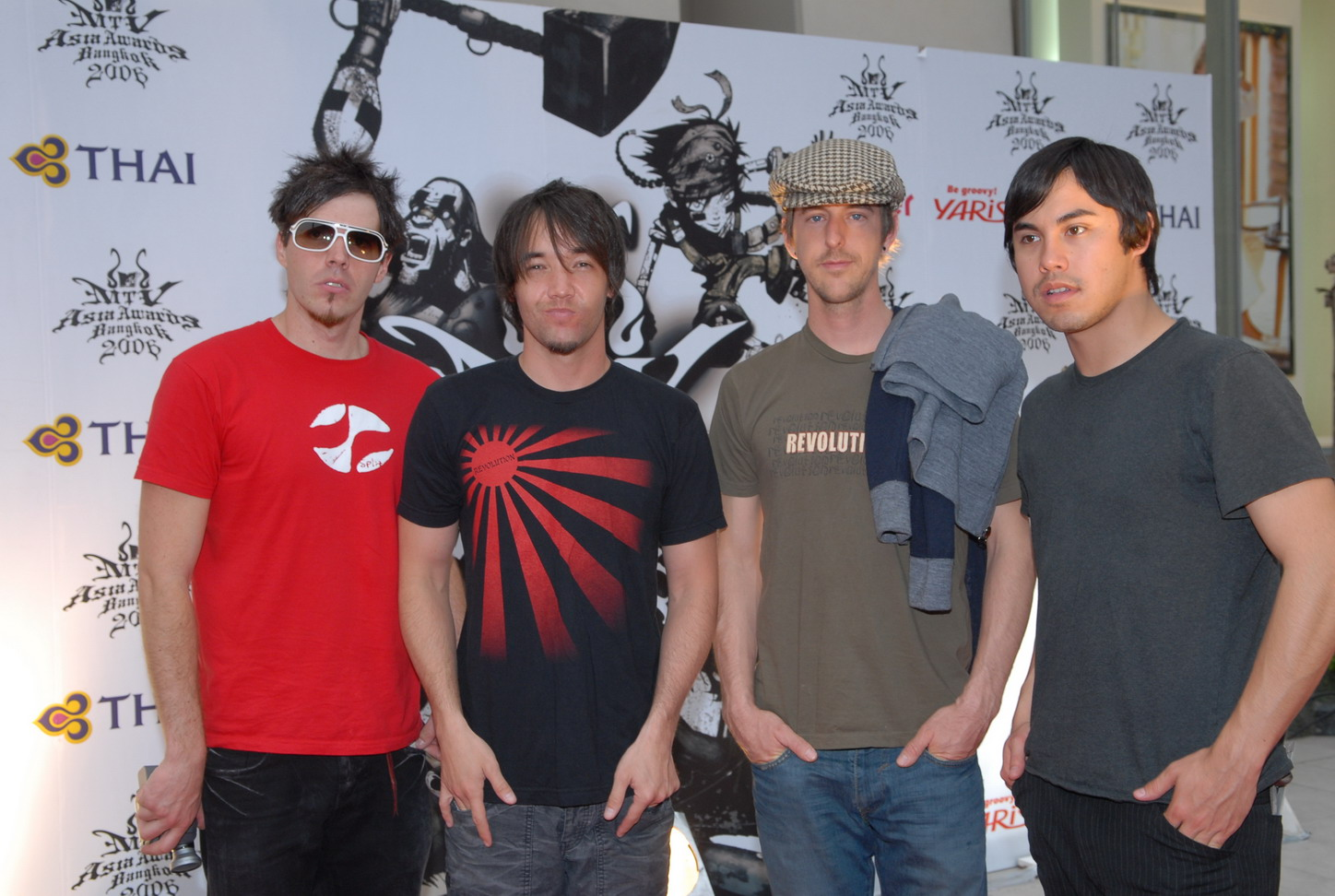
Moreau, far right, with Hoobastank

== Discography ==
=== with Awolnation ===
• Angel Miners & the Lightning Riders (2020)

=== with Cary Judd ===
- Looking Back From Space (2006)

=== with Katy Perry ===
- MTV Unplugged (2009)
- The Hello Katy Australian Tour (2009)
- The Prismatic World Tour Live (2015)
- Witness (2017)

=== with Lisa Chan ===
- Endless Beauty (2007)

=== with The Mars Volta ===
- Lucro Sucio; Los Ojos Del Vacio (2025)

=== with Matt Brouwer ===
- Unlearning / Live at The Fox (2005)

=== with Miley Cyrus ===
- Zombie (Live from the NIVA Save Our Stages Festival) (2020)
- Endless Summer Vacation (Backyard Sessions) (2023)

=== with Under the Influence of Giants ===
- Mama's Room (2006)
