= The Mars Volta (album) =

Studio album by the Mars Volta
- Released: September 16, 2022
- Recorded: 2019–2021
- Genres: Psychedelic rock; progressive pop; alternative rock
- Length: 44:45
- Label: Clouds Hill
- Producer: Omar Rodríguez-López

The Mars Volta chronology
Landscape Tantrums (2021)	The Mars Volta (2022)	Que Dios Te Maldiga Mi Corazón (2023)

Singles from The Mars Volta
- 1. "Blacklight Shine" Released: June 21, 2022; 2. "Graveyard Love" Released: July 8, 2022; 3. "Vigil" Released: August 5, 2022

The Mars Volta is the seventh studio album by American progressive rock band The Mars Volta, released through Clouds Hill on September 16, 2022. Produced by guitarist, songwriter and musical director Omar Rodríguez-López, the album was preceded by the singles "Blacklight Shine", "Graveyard Love" and "Vigil".

Self-titled to mark a "clean slate" in the band's history, it is the band's first studio album in over ten years, following their 2012 album, Noctourniquet, and subsequent break-up. After reuniting in secret in 2019, band leaders Rodríguez-López and Cedric Bixler-Zavala made a conscious effort to break from their previous progressive rock sound and instead record a pop-influenced album. Bixler-Zavala shifted away from his earlier enigmatic lyrics to directly address his family's recent struggles with the Church of Scientology.

Founding bass guitarist Eva Gardner and longtime keyboardist and percussionist Marcel Rodríguez-López returned to the band during the recording process, recording their parts in New York alongside session drummer Willy Rodriguez Quiñones. Jazz pianist Leo Genovese contributed to the recording process, eventually joining the band on a full-time basis for the album's accompanying tour, alongside new drummer Linda-Philomène Tsoungui.

The band re-recorded the album acoustically and released it as Que Dios Te Maldiga Mi Corazón on April 21, 2023.

== Background ==
In late 2012, following the release of the Mars Volta's sixth studio album, Noctourniquet, core members Cedric Bixler-Zavala (vocals) and Omar Rodríguez-López (guitar, production) disbanded the group after a falling out between the pair. Writing on his personal Twitter account in early 2013, Bixler-Zavala stated: "I can’t sit here and pretend any more. I no longer am a member of Mars Volta. For the record I tried my hardest to get a full scale North American tour going for Noctourniquet but Omar did not want to." Reflecting on this in 2022, Bixler-Zavala noted: "I was in a really impatient place when I left the band, very immaturely, in a loud way on social media. It was just sort of being a brat." At this time, Bixler-Zavala had joined the Church of Scientology, creating tension between himself and Rodríguez-López and resulting in the pair growing apart.

Within two years of the falling-out, the pair had reconciled, subsequently forming the supergroup Antemasque and working on the At the Drive-In album, In•ter a•li•a (2017), before regrouping as the Mars Volta in secret in 2019. Remarking on the differences between At the Drive-In and the Mars Volta, Rodríguez-López noted: "The At the Drive-In thing was a very finite thing. It was partly nostalgia and the past, and where we come from and our roots. There’s a certain expectation and a certain thing that you have to give there, and the parameters are very much set. With the Mars Volta, it always goes back to the idea of, ‘Is it exciting, does it move me? Is what I’m hearing coming back out of the speakers just something that makes me dance?’"

A press release for the album stated that the album contains only "two tracks longer than four minutes", marking a shift away from the band's progressive rock sound and into sonic territory marked by "more subtle touches and Caribbean rhythms". The same press release also read that the band are at their "most mature, most concise, most focused" on the album.

== Recording ==
Upon reuniting the Mars Volta in secret in 2019, Rodríguez-López made a conscious decision not to return to the band's progressive rock sound on any new recordings. This was, in part, influenced by his and Bixler-Zavala's continued work with At the Drive-In between 2016 and 2018: "Being on tour with At the Drive-In for three years, playing way faster than we even do in Mars Volta and more aggressively, you know, it's all the same frequencies, right? Two guitars, the cymbals and Cedric's voice are all in the same frequency, fighting all night long, every day. With the exhaustion of the tour, I just started making tracks, and as I was saturated with this other thing, I wanted to do something else. For me, the most exciting new direction is something we haven't done: to cut things down, to do our version of pop."

The majority of Bixler-Zavala and Rodríguez-López's collaborations were recorded over a ten-day period, at a Los Angeles house that Rodríguez-López had rented. Rodríguez-López arrived at the sessions with up to 48 song ideas, with Bixler-Zavala writing and recording quickly to the material he responded to the most. Rodríguez-López noted: "I'm just looking for whatever he reacts to naturally. Those things stay true to the end."

== Writing and composition ==
Writing melodies in keeping with guitarist and musical director Rodríguez-López's pop-based aesthetic, vocalist and lyricist Bixler-Zavala was influenced by David Bowie, Phil Collins, Peter Gabriel and Paul Weller, whose careers often transitioned from experimental work to mainstream success: "I'm looking for that gray area where it's just starting to be pop, but their old selves are still there." On Weller's influence in particular, Bixler-Zavala described The Mars Volta as the band's "Style Council moment", referring to Weller's decision to pivot genres following the break-up of The Jam: "Quite frankly, a lot of [fans of The Jam] needed to have the Style Council put in front of them, just to show them that you can't be stuck in a genre. It becomes cosplay after a certain time, people start dressing like you, the cover bands come out, the bands who don't understand influence and just make carbon copies then start being praised. You have to reinvent shit, and embrace things your fans didn't think you would embrace."

Bixler-Zavala's lyrics were directly influenced by his wife Chrissie Carnell Bixler's legal battles with the actor Danny Masterson and the Church of Scientology, with Carnell Bixler and three other women accusing Masterson of rape and the Church of Scientology with "stalking, invasion of privacy and intentional infliction of emotional distress". In fear of repercussions and tampering by the Church of Scientology, Bixler-Zavala and Rodríguez-López sent their in-progress songs to one another via CDs rather than using cloud storage.

As a result of the personal subject matter and overall shift in musical style, Bixler-Zavala consciously wrote lyrics that were less cryptic than the band's previous material: "In these songs, there are more direct expressions of what you're supposed to be feeling. On a lot of other Mars Volta records, you'll have that every once in a while. But more often you'll have this total sci-fi riddle. Now I'm speaking about just the things that are happening."

Bixler-Zavala wrote "Palm Full of Crux" as a tribute to the band's co-founding member Jeremy Michael Ward. Ward died of an apparent heroin overdose on May 25, 2003, just months before the release of the band's debut album, De-Loused in the Comatorium. Bixler-Zavala wrote the track "as a lighthouse to him, wherever he is".

Prior to the release of the band's 2009 album, Octahedron, both Rodríguez-López and Bixler-Zavala suggested that that album was their first "pop" release, with Bixler-Zavala noting at the time: "We wanted to make the opposite of all the records we've done. All along we've threatened people that we'd make a pop record, and now we have." Reflecting on what they considered "pop" at that time and his resistance to writing songs within the genre, Bixler-Zavala noted: "At the time I couldn't have that conversation, because I was so stuck in whatever sort of genre where we were pigeonholed as. I was so comfortable, and I was so used to making very long songs and having them be labyrinth-like and all that kind of stuff. And I just couldn't get my head around it." Rodríguez-López elaborated: "We've been warning you guys, we were saying ten years ago that the most revolutionary thing we could do was make a pop record. We're in our mid-to-late 40s and you can't just still be doing the same shit, expecting to wear an old t-shirt that doesn't fit any more."

Rodríguez-López and Bixler-Zavala self-titled the album to give them a "clean slate" from their past work as the Mars Volta. Rodríguez-López would later state, "I feel like The Mars Volta is finally beginning – that’s why the last album was self-titled, because we’ve finally stripped everything away and arrived at what the whole concept was at the beginning."

== Critical reception ==
Professional ratings
Aggregate scores
Source	Rating
Metacritic	80/100
Review scores
Source	Rating
AllMusic	3.5/5 stars
Clash	8/10
Classic Rock	3.5/5 stars
Exclaim!	8/10
musicOMH	4/5 stars
NME	5/5 stars
Pitchfork	6.5/10
PopMatters	8/10
Sputnikmusic	3.2/5
Uncut	8/10

The Mars Volta received positive reviews upon its release. At Metacritic, which assigns a normalized rating out of 100 to reviews from mainstream publications, the album received an average score of 80, based on eleven reviews.

Reviewing that album for Clash, Robin Murray wrote about that band's approach to the album; "Little on here stretches beyond the four minute mark, with The Mars Volta opting for brevity and precision, over the excess of old. Yet perhaps that's where the challenge lies, both to themselves and their audience – in hitting reset, The Mars Volta have hit upon an incredibly surprising new phase in their multi-faceted evolution." Ian Gormley also commented on the band's change of direction in the review for Exclaim!, stating that, "While these songs are smooth, they are, mercifully, not "Smooth." This is still the band who made an album inspired by a ouija board, after all. But the record is certainly Bixler-Zavala and Rodriquez-Lopez at their most earth-bound since their days in At the Drive-In's original run.". Writing for musicOMH, Ben Hogwood called the album the band's "most revolutionary album yet" and described it as a combination of "dense progressive workouts, straight ahead pop, Latin-American rhythms and dance figures."

In a review for AllMusic, Timothy Monger mentioned that "the veteran band sound confident and invigorated, adding another surprising chapter to a consistently eclectic career." At NME, Andy Price declared that "This isn't just a striking return for one of the most individual bands of the last 20 years; it is, musically, an astounding masterpiece. Their finest hour? Quite possibly."

Reception for the album was more subdued in the review for Pitchfork by Matthew Ismael Ruiz, who stated that, "The previous iteration of the band thrived at the border of brilliant and unhinged, and The Mars Volta is too conventional to be called their best work. But it is certainly their most honest: a sober tale written by survivors, the first uneasy step into unfamiliar territory." In a similar manner, Simon K. at Sputnikmusic stated that "if you're looking for some of the band's best creative ideas, you won't find many of them here. Nevertheless, if you're wanting a wholesome pop-rock album with plenty of experimentation, you may find a thing or two to like here."

== Track listing ==
All lyrics are written by Cedric Bixler-Zavala; all music is composed by Omar Rodríguez-López.

No.	Title	Length
1.	"Blacklight Shine"	2:55
2.	"Graveyard Love"	3:14
3.	"Shore Story"	3:15
4.	"Blank Condolences"	3:27
5.	"Vigil"	3:14
6.	"Que Dios Te Maldiga Mi Corazón"	1:41
7.	"Cerulea"	3:45
8.	"Flash Burns from Flashbacks"	2:38
9.	"Palm Full of Crux"	3:36
10.	"No Case Gain"	2:41
11.	"Tourmaline"	3:34
12.	"Equus 3"	4:09
13.	"Collapsible Shoulders"	2:24
14.	"The Requisition"	4:12
Total length:		44:45

== Personnel ==
=== The Mars Volta ===
- Cedric Bixler-Zavala – vocals
- Omar Rodríguez-López – guitars, synthesizers, direction, arrangements
- Marcel Rodríguez-López – synthesizers
- Eva Gardner – bass guitar
- Willy Rodriguez Quiñones – drums

=== Additional musicians ===
- Leo Genovese – keyboards
- Daniel Diaz Rivera – percussion

=== Technical ===
- Omar Rodríguez-López – production, engineering
- Marcel Rodríguez-López – engineering, mixing
- Jon Debaun – engineering
- Chris Common – engineering
- Luis Bacqué – engineering
- Matthew Neighbour – editing
- Chris von Rautenkranz – mastering
- Stuart Gili-Ross – production coordinator
- Alma L. Zayas – art direction and design
- Adan Guevara – design and layout

== Charts ==
Chart performance for The Mars Volta
Chart (2022)	Peak position
Australian Albums (ARIA)	86
Austrian Albums (Ö3 Austria)	66
Belgian Albums (Ultratop Flanders)	142
Belgian Albums (Ultratop Wallonia)	152
German Albums (Offizielle Top 100)	18
Portuguese Albums (AFP)	49
Scottish Albums (Official Charts)	39
Swiss Albums (Schweizer Hitparade)	42
UK Album Downloads (Official Charts)	18
UK Independent Albums (Official Charts)	11
US Billboard 200	83
US Independent Albums (Billboard)	10
US Top Alternative Albums (Billboard)	6
