= Filomena (disambiguation) =

Filomena is a female given name.

It can also refer to:

- The Decameron
- Santa Filomena (disambiguation), various meanings
- Santa Filomena, a poem by Henry Wadsworth Longfellow which alluded to Florence Nightingale and coined the term "lady with the lamp"
- Storm Filomena in 2021
