= Que Dios Te Maldiga Mi Corazón =

Studio album (re-recorded acoustically) by the Mars Volta
- Released: April 21, 2023
- Length: 47:22
- Label: Clouds Hill
- Producer: Omar Rodríguez-López

The Mars Volta chronology
The Mars Volta (2022)	Que Dios Te Maldiga Mi Corazón (2023)	Lucro Sucio; Los Ojos del Vacio (2025)

Singles from Que Dios Te Maldiga Mi Corazón
- 1. "Blank Condolences (acoustic)" Released: March 10, 2023; 2. "Palm Full of Crux (acoustic)" Released: March 31, 2023

Professional ratings
Aggregate scores
Source	Rating
Metacritic	68/100
Review scores
Source	Rating
AllMusic	3.5/5 stars
PopMatters	7/10
Sputnikmusic	2.2/5

Que Dios Te Maldiga Mi Corazón (transl. May God Curse You, My Love) is the eighth studio album by American progressive rock band The Mars Volta. It was released on April 21, 2023, through Clouds Hill Records, and comprises a complete acoustic re-recording of the band's previous self-titled album from 2022. "Blank Condolences" was released as the album's lead single on March 10, 2023; "Palm Full of Crux" followed on March 31.

== Overview ==
Que Dios Te Maldiga Mi Corazón is the acoustic reimagining of The Mars Volta's self-titled album released the previous year in 2022. According to Rodríguez-López, the album is "The Mars Volta’s version of a 'folk record,' tracing the melodies and rhythms of the parent album back to their traditional Caribbean roots and challenging listeners to hear the group in an entirely new light." He further states that the album's predecessor, The Mars Volta, felt like the true beginning of the band and what its original concept was supposed to be. Que Dios, according to Rodríguez-López has its own meaning and philosophy.

It has been described as a creative folk record with "strong political overtones."

== Track listing ==
All lyrics are written by Cedric Bixler-Zavala; all music is composed by Omar Rodríguez-López.

No.	Title	Length
1.	"Blacklight Shine"	2:58
2.	"Graveyard Love"	3:43
3.	"Shore Story"	3:22
4.	"Blank Condolences"	3:28
5.	"Vigil"	3:35
6.	"Que Dios Te Maldiga Mi Corazón"	1:52
7.	"Cerulea"	3:54
8.	"Flash Burns from Flashbacks"	3:28
9.	"Palm Full of Crux"	3:41
10.	"NoCaseGain"	2:49
11.	"Tourmaline"	3:29
12.	"Equus 3"	3:52
13.	"Collapsible Shoulders"	2:38
14.	"The Requisition"	4:33
Total length:		47:22

=== Notes ===
- All tracks are subtitled “acoustic”.

== Personnel ==
The Mars Volta

- Omar Rodríguez-López – guitar, flute, production, engineering
- Cedric Bixler-Zavala – vocals
- Marcel Rodríguez-López – keyboards, Mellotron, piano, additional percussion, mixing
- Eva Gardner – double bass
- Leo Genovese – piano

Additional contributors

- Daniel Diaz Rivera – percussion

Technical

- Omar Rodríguez-López – production, engineering
- Marcel Rodríguez-López – engineering, mixing
- Jon Debaun – engineering
- Chris von Rautenkranz – mastering
- Heino Leja – lacquer cut
- Adán Guevara – design, layout
- Alma L. Zayas – art direction
