= Wax Simulacra =

Single by the Mars Volta

from the album The Bedlam in Goliath
- B-side: "Pulled to Bits"
- Released: 2007
- Recorded: 2007
- Genre: Progressive rock, experimental rock, noise rock, post-hardcore
- Length: 2:39
- Label: Universal Records
- Songwriters: Cedric Bixler-Zavala, Omar Rodríguez-López
- Producer: Omar Rodríguez-López

The Mars Volta singles chronology
"Viscera Eyes" (2006)	"Wax Simulacra" (2007)	"Goliath" (2008)

"Wax Simulacra" is a single from the album The Bedlam in Goliath by the Mars Volta. The single was released in 2007, on San Francisco's Live 105 FM. It was previously played live by the band under the name "Idle Tooth". The B-side "Pulled to Bits" is a cover of a Siouxsie and the Banshees song.

Wax Simulacra, then-titled "Idle Tooth," made its live debut March 12, 2007 at St. James Theatre in Auckland, New Zealand. On October 19, 2007, a promotional video for the single was released via the Universal Music Group web site. A video for the song features a montage of clips from the unreleased live DVD of Melbourne and Sydney 2007 shows, filmed by El Bufalo De La Noche director, Jorge Aldana.

On November 20, 2007, the song was released for download on the iTunes Store and the Zune Marketplace. On January 17, 2008, the song was performed on the Late Show with David Letterman. On January 22, 2009, the song was performed on MTV Live.

The song won the Grammy for Best Hard Rock Performance at the pre-telecast ceremony for the 51st Grammy Awards in 2009.

== Track listing ==
1. "Wax Simulacra" - 2:39
2. "Pulled to Bits" - 3:33
