= Willy Rodriguez =

Puerto Rican-American drummer (born 1983)

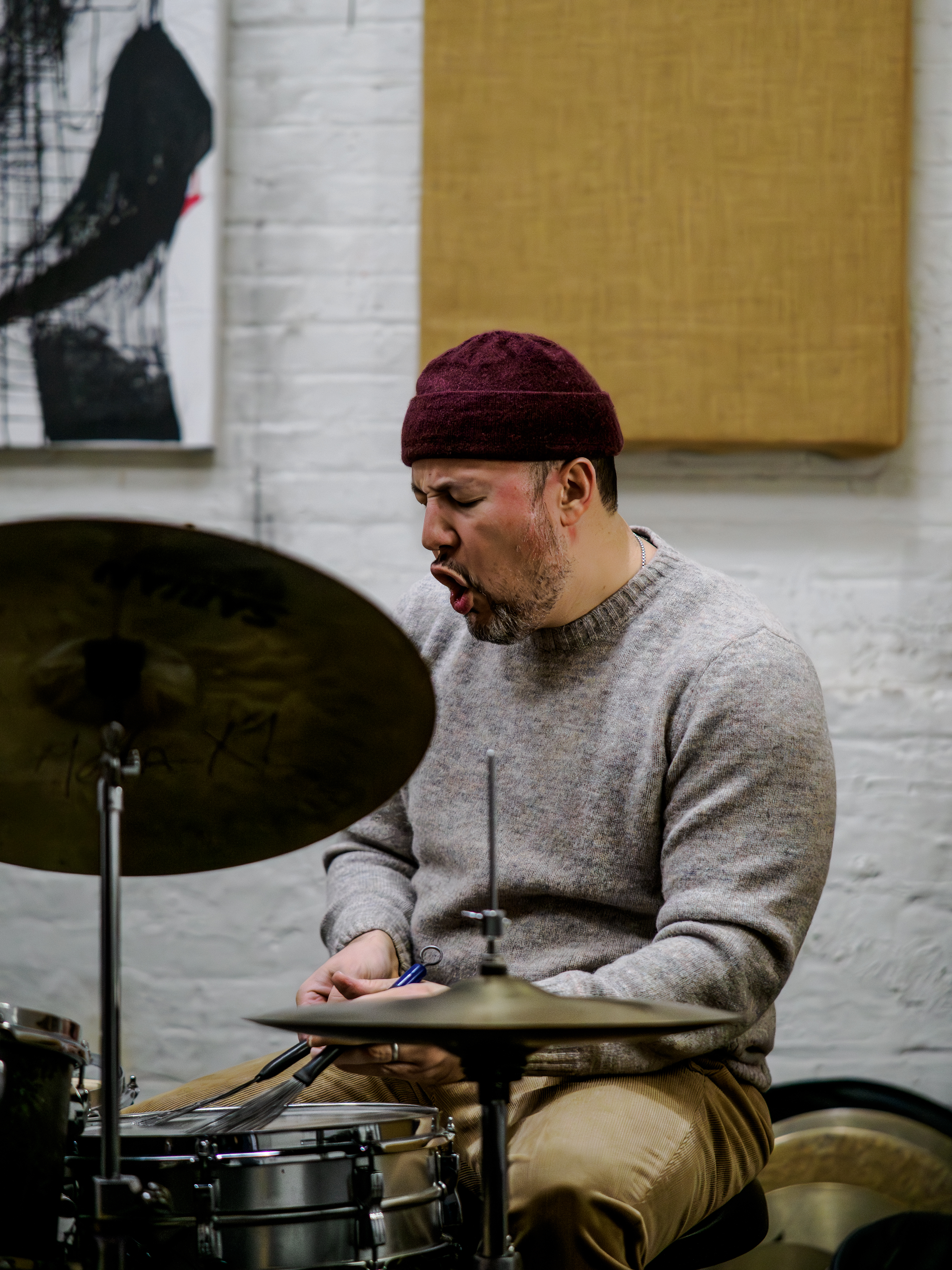
- Rodriguez in 2024

Background information
- Also known as: Willy Rodriguez Quiñones
- Born: William Rodriguez; January 26, 1983 (age 43); Ponce, Puerto Rico

Willy Rodriguez, (born January 26,1983) also credited as Willy Rodriguez Quiñones, is a Puerto Rican drummer and percussionist based in New York City. He has recorded with The Mars Volta, Mon Laferte, and Dave Liebman, and released the albums Seeing Sounds (2024) and In The Unknown (I Will Find You) (2026) as a leader.

== Early life and education ==
Rodriguez was born on January 26, 1983, in Ponce, Puerto Rico. He began playing drums as a teenager and later studied at Berklee College of Music before earning a master's degree in Jazz Drum Performance from New England Conservatory.

== Career ==
Rodriguez was the in-studio drummer on The Mars Volta's 2022 self-titled album. He also contributed to the band's ninth studio album, Lucro sucio; Los ojos del vacío, released in 2025.

In Latin music, he performed on Mon Laferte's 2018 album Norma, recorded live at Capitol Studios in Los Angeles, to which he earned a Latin Grammy for. In jazz, he recorded with Dave Liebman on the album Ceremony (2014).

Rodriguez's projects include his Latin ensemble 427 Flavah Factory. He has also performed with Jason Palmer, John Ellis, and Melissa Aldana.

As a leader, he released Seeing Sounds in 2024 with Jason Palmer (trumpet), Hery Paz (saxophone), Leo Genovese (piano), John Hébert and Kenneth Jimenez (basses), and guest Dave Liebman (soprano saxophone). The album was reviewed by outlets including DownBeat Magazine, Making A Scene!, That Canadian Magazine and The New York City Jazz Record.

His second album as a leader, In The Unknown (I Will Find You), was released in 2026 on Sunnyside. The album received critical acclaim from outlets such as DownBeat Magazine, AllMusic, Jazzwise and more. That same year, Rodriguez was voted as the co-winner of the DownBeat critics poll in the Rising Star - Percussionist, category.

== Selected discography ==
As leader

- Seeing Sounds (2024, Coucs Music) — drums, percussion; with Jason Palmer, Hery Paz, Leo Genovese, John Hébert, Kenneth Jimenez; guest Dave Liebman.
- In the Unknown (I Will Find You) — (2026, Sunnyside Communications) with Leo Genovese, Ingrid Laubrock

As sideman / collaborator

- The Mars Volta — Lucro sucio; Los Ojos del Vacío (2025, Clouds Hill) — drums (additional performer).
- The Mars Volta — The Mars Volta (2022, Clouds Hill) — drums (session).
- Mon Laferte — Norma (2018, Universal México) — drums, percussion.
- Dave Liebman — Ceremony (2014, Chesky) — drums, percussion.
- Francesco Marcocci Quintet — Folklorico (2014, Baobab)— drums, percussion.
