= The Mars Volta =

American rock band

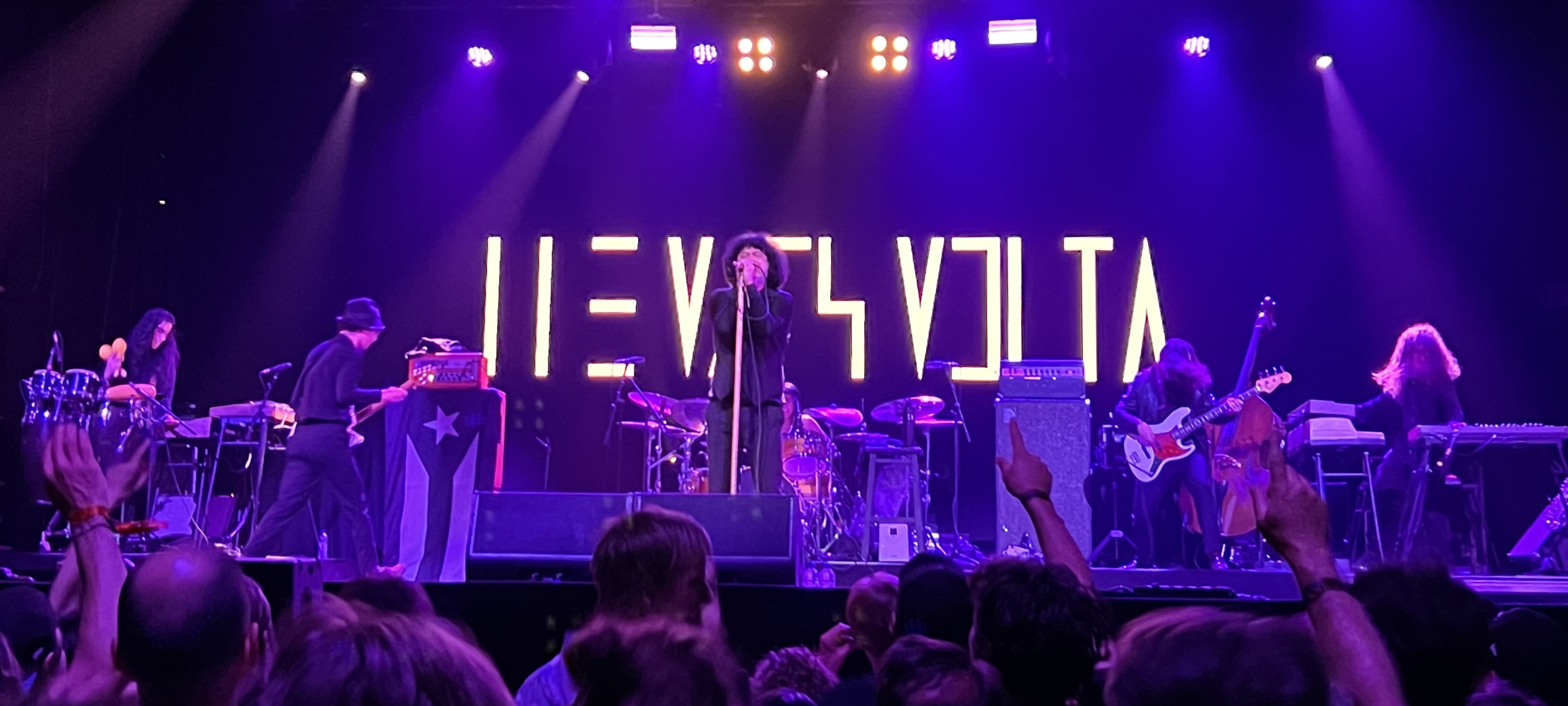
- The Mars Volta performing in 2023

Background information
- Origin: El Paso, Texas, U.S.
- Genres: Progressive rock; art rock; jazz fusion; experimental rock; post-hardcore; post-rock; progressive punk; math rock; psychedelic rock
- Years active: 2001–2013; 2019–present
- Labels: Universal; GSL; Warner Bros.; Clouds Hill; Inside Out Music
- Spinoffs: Antemasque; Bosnian Rainbows; El Grupo Nuevo de Omar Rodriguez Lopez; Omar Rodriguez Lopez Group; Zavalaz; Anywhere
- Spinoff of: At the Drive-In; De Facto
- Members: Omar Rodríguez-López; Cedric Bixler-Zavala; Eva Gardner; Marcel Rodríguez-López; Leo Genovese; Linda-Philomène Tsoungui; Teri Gender Bender
- Past members: Ikey Owens; Jeremy Ward; Blake Fleming; Jon Theodore; Ralph Jasso; Linda Good; Flea; Jason Lader; Juan Alderete; Adrián Terrazas-González; Deantoni Parks; John Frusciante; Paul Hinojos; Thomas Pridgen; Henry Trejo; Dave Elitch; Lars Stalfors; Willy Rodriguez

The Mars Volta is an American progressive rock band formed in 2001. The band's only constant members are Omar Rodríguez-López (guitar, producer, direction) and Cedric Bixler-Zavala (vocals, lyrics), whose partnership forms the core of the band. The band's current line-up also includes founding member Eva Gardner (bass), Omar's brother Marcel Rodríguez-López (keyboards, synths, percussion), Leo Genovese (piano, keyboard, saxophone) and Linda-Philomène Tsoungui (drums).

Known for their energetic live shows and concept albums, The Mars Volta formed following the break-up of Rodríguez-López and Bixler-Zavala's previous band, At the Drive-In. Seeking to experiment and expand their sound, Rodríguez-López and Bixler-Zavala recruited Gardner, Isaiah "Ikey" Owens (keyboards), Jon Theodore (drums) and Jeremy Ward (sound manipulation) to form The Mars Volta. The band released their debut EP, Tremulant, in 2002, with Gardner leaving the band prior to recording their debut album, De-Loused in the Comatorium. She was replaced by Red Hot Chili Peppers' bass guitarist Flea for the sessions. The Rick Rubin-produced album received widespread critical acclaim upon its release in 2003.

The band's second studio album, Frances the Mute (2005), was self-produced by Rodríguez-López and was the first to feature longterm members Juan Alderete (bass) and Marcel Rodríguez-López. The album debuted at No. 4 on the US Billboard 200 and became the band's biggest commercial success, selling over 500,000 copies in the US and achieving Gold certification from the RIAA. The band's third studio album, Amputechture, was released in 2006 and was the last album to feature Theodore. In 2008, the band released The Bedlam in Goliath, a concept album inspired by the band's turbulent experiences with a ouija-type talking board. The album's first single, "Wax Simulacra" was awarded a Grammy Award in 2009 for Best Hard Rock Performance. The band released its fifth album, Octahedron, in June 2009.

Following the release of their sixth album, Noctourniquet (2012), and a run of reunion shows with At the Drive-In, The Mars Volta entered a hiatus in September 2012. Rodríguez-López subsequently formed a new project, Bosnian Rainbows, and the band formally broke up in January 2013 amid disagreements between Rodríguez-López and Bixler-Zavala. The duo repaired their friendship and reunited in 2014 for a new project, Antemasque, and further At the Drive-In tours and recording sessions.

Reuniting in secret in 2019, Rodríguez-López and Bixler-Zavala recorded a new studio album, The Mars Volta, with Gardner, Marcel Rodríguez-López, and drummer Willy Rodriguez Quiñones. The band announced their reunion – after ten years of public inactivity – with an art installation called L'ytome Hodorxí Telesterion, in June 2022. For the band's live return, jazz pianist Leo Genovese, drummer Linda-Philomène Tsoungui and Josh Moreau were added to the line-up. The band's ninth album, Lucro Sucio; Los Ojos del Vacio, was released in April 2025.

== History ==
=== Name origin ===
The name, The Mars Volta, derives from Bixler-Zavala and Rodríguez-López's adoration of Federico Fellini's films and science fiction. "Mars" is a general nod to outer space and science fiction. "Volta" refers to a word in a book Fellini wrote to describe a changing scene or turnaround in time in cinema. In Italian, volta can mean both time and to turn.

=== Formation and beginning (2001–2002) ===
The roots of The Mars Volta are found in the band At the Drive-In. ATDI imploded on the verge of a commercial breakthrough, partly due to boredom, partly to musical differences. Members Cedric Bixler-Zavala and Omar Rodríguez-López began to further explore their experimental, dub-influenced side project called De Facto, which featured Bixler-Zavala on drums, Rodríguez-López on bass, Isaiah "Ikey" Owens on keyboards, and Jeremy Ward on vocals, loops and sound effects.

During 2001 Eva Gardner joined the members of De Facto on bass, and they recorded two songs with drummer Blake Fleming and producer Alex Newport, which became the first demo by The Mars Volta. The lineup for their first public show at Chain Reaction in Anaheim, California was Rodríguez-López, Bixler-Zavala, Owens, Gardner, Ward, and drummer Jon Theodore. This lineup recorded three more tracks with Alex Newport, which became the EP Tremulant, released in early 2002 by Gold Standard Laboratories.

After the demise of At the Drive-In, Rodríguez-López and Bixler-Zavala found themselves once again starting from the ground up, touring and performing in smaller venues. In their early years The Mars Volta were characterized by chaotic live shows and heavy drug use.

=== De-Loused in the Comatorium (2003–2004) ===
Following Tremulant, The Mars Volta continued touring with a fluid line-up while preparing to record their debut full-length album De-Loused in the Comatorium, produced with Rick Rubin and released on June 24, 2003. Whereas Tremulant had no general theme (except the prophetic mentioning) De-Loused was a unified work of speculative fiction telling the first-person story of someone in a drug-induced coma, battling the evil side of his mind. Though lyrically obscure, The Mars Volta stated in interviews that the album's protagonist is based on their late friend Julio Venegas, or "Cerpin Taxt", an El Paso poet and artist who went into a coma for several years after a deliberate drug overdose, recovered and later committed suicide. He died jumping from the Mesa Street overpass onto Interstate-10 in El Paso during afternoon rush-hour traffic. (Venegas' death was also referenced in the At the Drive-In song "Embroglio" from their album Acrobatic Tenement.)

In an interview with The Aquarian Weekly in 2008, Bixler-Zavala said about working with Rubin, "Rick really over-simplified some of the parts that we thought were unique, and just made them very digestible. He's got this thing about representing the common man's ears—I'd rather jab the common man's ears. If we don't, we'll never get to a place where future music exists."

The Mars Volta had no official bassist during the recording session, but Flea (of the Red Hot Chili Peppers) played bass on nine of the album's ten songs, with Justin Meldal-Johnsen playing double bass on "Televators". Flea's bandmate John Frusciante also contributed additional guitar, synthesizer and backing vocals to "Cicatriz ESP". After several temporary replacements, a permanent bassist for the band was found in Juan Alderete (formerly of Racer X).

Despite limited promotion, De-Loused earned strong reviews, and appeared on several 'year-end best-of' lists. The album remains The Mars Volta's best-seller, with over 500,000 copies sold. Rolling Stone ranked a track from De-Loused, "Drunkship of Lanterns", the 91st Best Guitar Song Ever. The band later released a limited-edition storybook version of the album, available by download from the Gold Standard Laboratories website. The book speaks of Cerpin Taxt (Julio Venegas) and his suicide.

While on tour with the Red Hot Chili Peppers in support of the album, founding member Jeremy Ward died of a heroin overdose. The band had canceled the tour's second leg, and the first single from De-Loused was later dedicated to Ward. It was this event which finally convinced band leaders Rodríguez-López and Bixler-Zavala to purportedly quit using opioids. Bixler-Zavala recalled: "One day, we were all getting high, and Jeremy asked me if I could see he had worms in his head. I never touched the stuff again. His passing was the final nail in the coffin. We never went back."

=== Frances the Mute (2005) ===
As the band resumed touring to support De-Loused, they added Marcel Rodríguez-López (Omar's brother) on percussion. Work on their second album began in 2004. That year the band received the American Society of Composers, Authors and Publishers Vanguard Award.

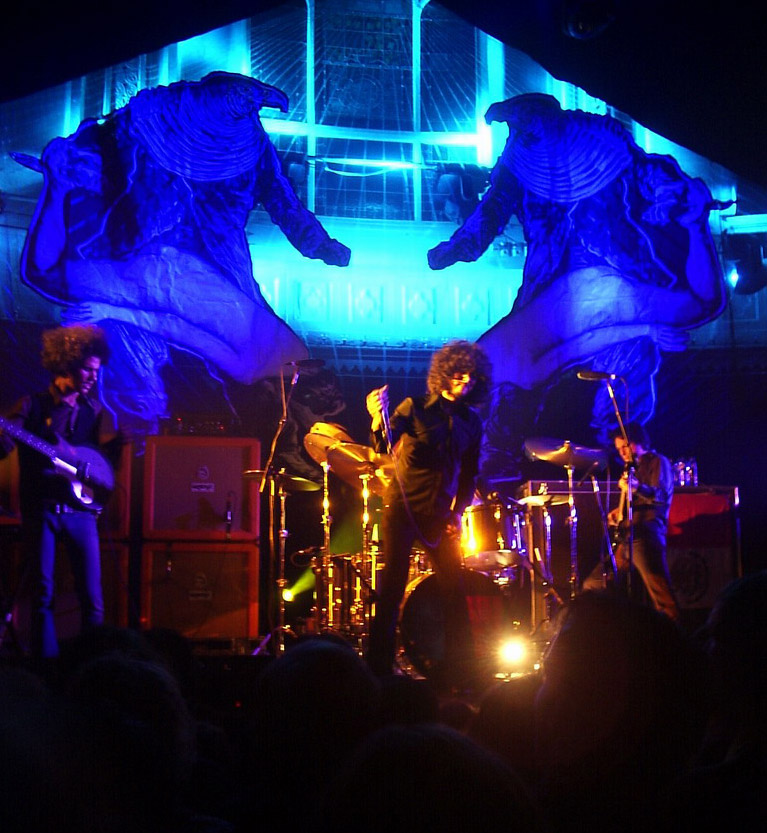
Live at Paradiso – Amsterdam October 16, 2005

In 2005, the band released Frances the Mute. The story given by the band on the album's concept concerns a diary that had been found in a repossessed car by late sound technician Jeremy Ward, while working as a repo-man. The author of the diary is unknown but appeared to be someone who was adopted and was searching for their birth parents, and who may have suffered from mental illness caused by the death of a loved one. The lyrics for each track on the album are loosely based on characters and life events described in this person's diary.

Frances the Mute started as a bigger commercial hit than De-Loused, moving 123,000 copies in its first week, and debuting at No. 4 on the Billboard album charts. Reviews of Frances were generally positive (with a 75 on Metacritic) if somewhat polarized; Rolling Stone called it "a feverish and baroque search for self that conjures up the same majesty and gravity as Led Zeppelin three decades before", and even the detractors of Frances the Mute generally praised the band's musical abilities. "L'Via L'Viaquez" was later released as the 12 minute B-side to "The Bible And The Breathalyzer" single, a song which did not appear on the album. Frances the Mute has sold nearly 465,000 copies in the United States, according to Nielsen SoundScan ratings.

Rodríguez-López wrote all of the instrumental parts as well as arranging and producing the recording sessions himself. He used a method that Miles Davis used to evoke great performances from bandmates: refusing to let the other members hear each other's parts, or the context of their own part, thereby forcing them to play each part as if it were a self-sufficient song. In order to accomplish this, the musicians recorded to the pulse of a metronome. While in the studio, Rodríguez-López recruited Adrián Terrazas-González to play saxophone, flute, and additional wind instruments for the album. Terrazas-González was added as a permanent member to The Mars Volta while touring in support of Frances the Mute.

Several songs written during the original recording sessions for the album never made the final cut. Notably, the self-titled 14-minute epic "Frances the Mute", which was originally to open the album and was ultimately supposed to decode the album's concept, was not included due to time constraints. Instead the track was featured as a b-side to the single release for "The Widow".

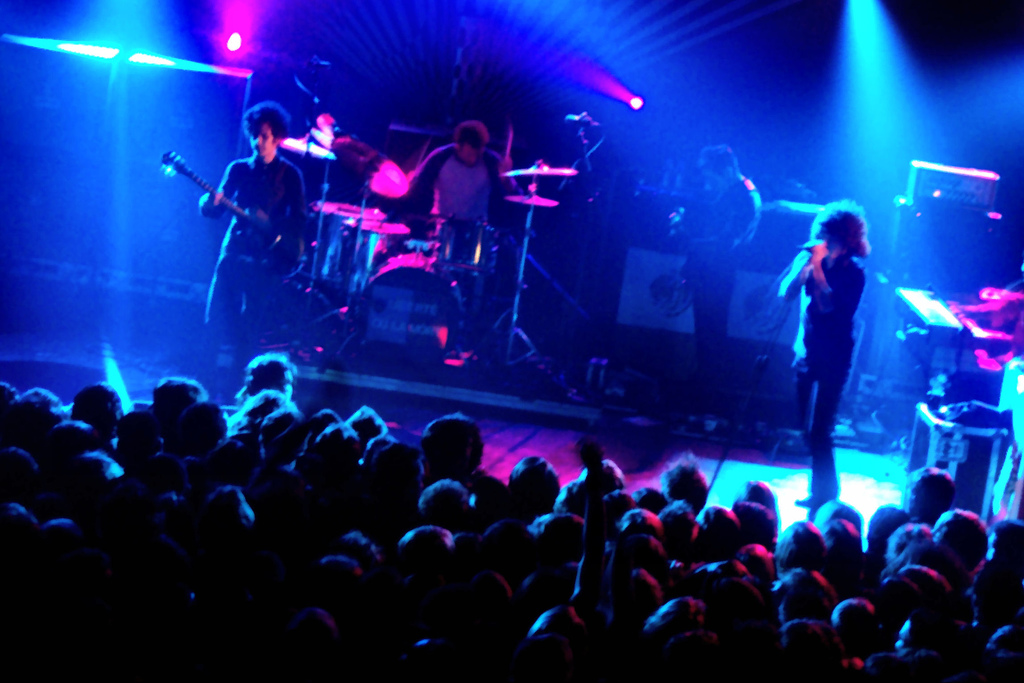
Live at Birmingham Academy November 30, 2005, with drummer Jon Theodore

On May 21, 2005, instead of playing a traditional set at KROQ's Weenie Roast Festival, the band played a 50-minute improvisation jam that was jokingly named on-the-spot as "Abortion, The Other White Meat" by Rodríguez-López. In keeping with The Mars Volta's tradition of testing and developing new work live, parts of "Abortion" later appeared on "Population Council's Wet Dream" from Rodríguez-López's 2009 album Old Money.

Midway through their headlining U.S. tour, former At the Drive-In member Paul Hinojos left the band Sparta to join The Mars Volta, claiming, "My time with Sparta has run its course, and simply wasn't fun anymore." Hinojos joined as live rhythm guitarist and became the band's sound manipulator, the position previously held by the late Ward. Hinojos had previously toured with The Mars Volta in 2003, filling in for Ward's sound manipulation duties.

During mid-2005, the band toured in support of the album with System of a Down and curated the All Tomorrow's Parties festival at Camber Sands in England. In addition, a full-length live album named Scabdates was released on November 8, 2005.

=== Amputechture (2006–2007) ===
Upon finishing the majority of touring for Frances the Mute in fall 2005, Rodríguez-López traveled to Amsterdam and wrote what became Amputechture, which was released on September 8, 2006, in Europe, on September 9, 2006, in Australia and on September 12, 2006, in the U.S. Rodríguez-López spent much of his time in Amsterdam working on and performing various solo projects most notably under the name "Omar Rodriguez Quintet". During this time Rodríguez-López also composed the score to the film El Búfalo de la Noche, which was written and directed by Guillermo Arriaga and Jorge Hernandez Aldana respectively. The Mars Volta as a whole performed the score.

Amputechture was produced by Rodríguez-López and mixed by Rich Costey. Jeff Jordan provided the artwork, making it their first album not to feature the work of Storm Thorgerson. It was once again a concept album, but rather than telling a story, the album was a series of vignettes, with each song telling a different story.

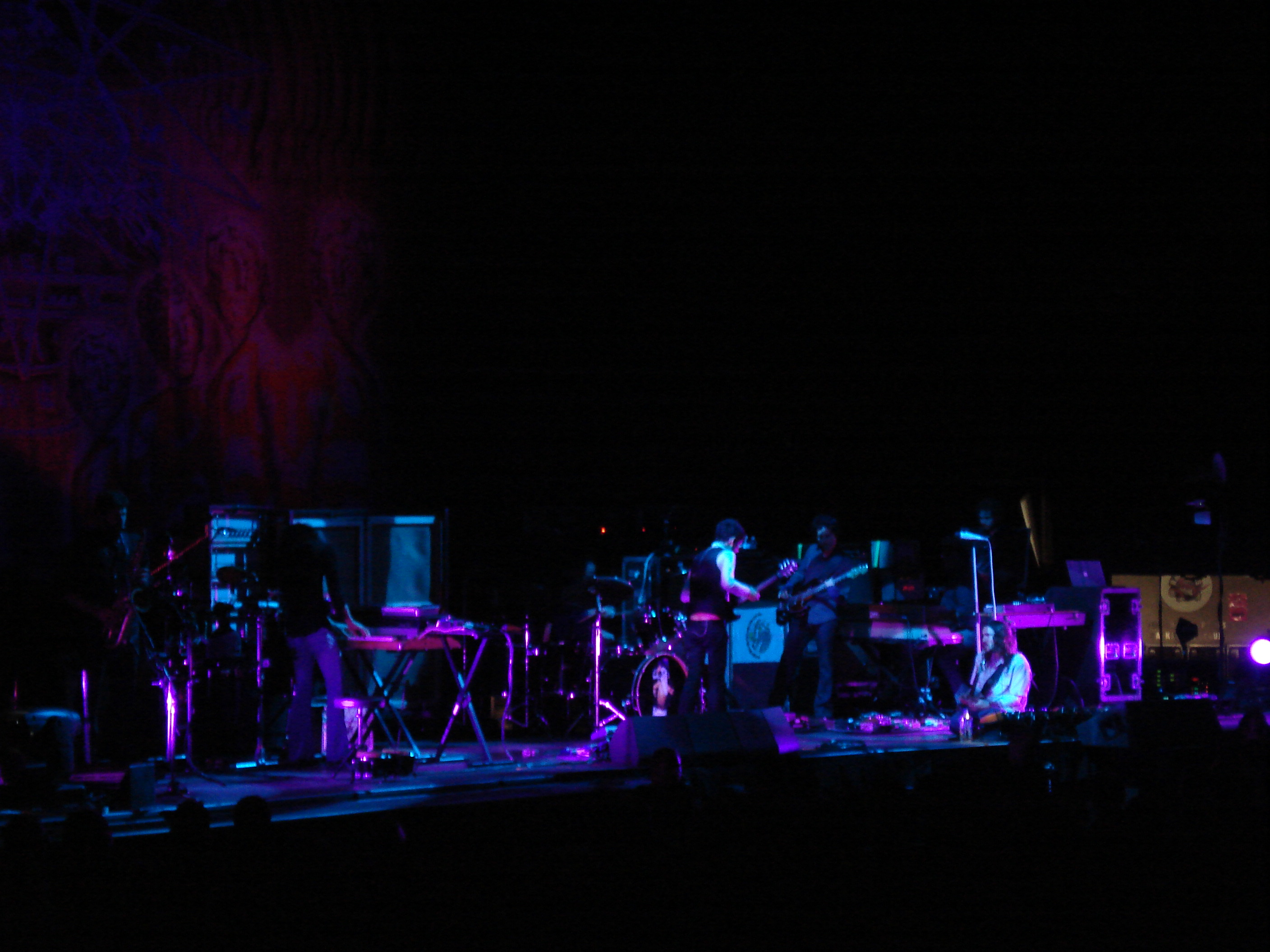
The Mars Volta playing with John Frusciante in Toronto on September 25, 2006

John Frusciante was featured on every track on Amputechture, except for "Asilos Magdalena". Rodríguez-López contributed the solos and riffs where the guitar work needed to be doubled. Bixler-Zavala said in an interview, "...he taught Frusciante all the new songs and Frusciante tracked guitars for us so Omar could sit back and listen to the songs objectively. It's great that he wants to help us and do that."

On July 28, 2006, the drummer's spot was filled by Blake Fleming, formerly of Laddio Bolocko, Dazzling Killmen, and the very first Mars Volta demos. A new song titled "Rapid Fire Tollbooth" was debuted live on September 22, 2006, in Chicago, Illinois, as reported by fans and attendees of the show who had received set lists from the stage. The song originally appears on Rodríguez-López's solo album Se Dice Bisonte, No Búfalo. The song eventually evolved into the track "Goliath" from the band's fourth studio album.

On September 25, 2006, The Mars Volta played a unique set on the opening night of a double-header in Toronto, Ontario. Cedric Bixler-Zavala fell ill and could not perform, so The Mars Volta played with John Frusciante on third guitar. The set consisted of over 47 minutes of instrumental material, including a lengthy cover of the Pink Floyd composition "Interstellar Overdrive". On October 17, 2006, while opening for the Red Hot Chili Peppers in East Rutherford, New Jersey, the band played with drummer Deantoni Parks as Rodríguez-López had fired Fleming because of complications within the band. Parks remained with the band only until the conclusion of the Japanese tour because of his prior commitments with other bands. On October 31, 2006, in Cleveland, Ohio, as Parks could not perform, The Mars Volta played an approximately 40-minute improvisation set as a rehearsal for another drummer, Thomas Pridgen.

On a 2006 episode of The Henry Rollins Show, The Mars Volta performed "Tetragrammaton" and "Day of the Baphomets" in a rare television performance. Afterwards, they did an interview with Rollins about the creation of Amputechture.

Amputechture was the last album with drummer Jon Theodore, whom Rodríguez-López and Bixler-Zavala fired before touring in support of the album. Rodríguez-López said in an interview with an Italian fan site that Theodore was the only member in the band who was not happy playing live and brought down the moods of the rest. In a 2014 interview with comedian Dean Delray, Theodore explained his departure from The Mars Volta, confirming his conflicted feelings and emphasizing his fondness and respect for the band in retrospect. Shortly before the tour to promote Amputechture was set to begin, Theodore told his girlfriend at the time,

“I’m going to go back and tell them, after this album you need to start looking for someone else, because I can’t do this anymore.” And I think psychically, they must have picked that up because I got home, they were like, “we’re having a band meeting.” And I was like, “what do you mean? We’ve never had a band meeting before.” And they came to my house and they were like, “It’s not working.” […]

I gave them no choice. I had basically, like, energetically, quit the band. But I was afraid to leave it, because after five years, it was all I had. […]

When they did it, I remember it was, like, really emotional. We were crying…but I was like, “thank you, for stepping up and doing this, because I didn’t have the balls to do it right now.” […]

The main thing that I learned is that it’s never too late to talk. Because I missed a lot of opportunities. I could have been like, “I’m really unhappy, and this is why.”

=== The Bedlam in Goliath (2008) ===
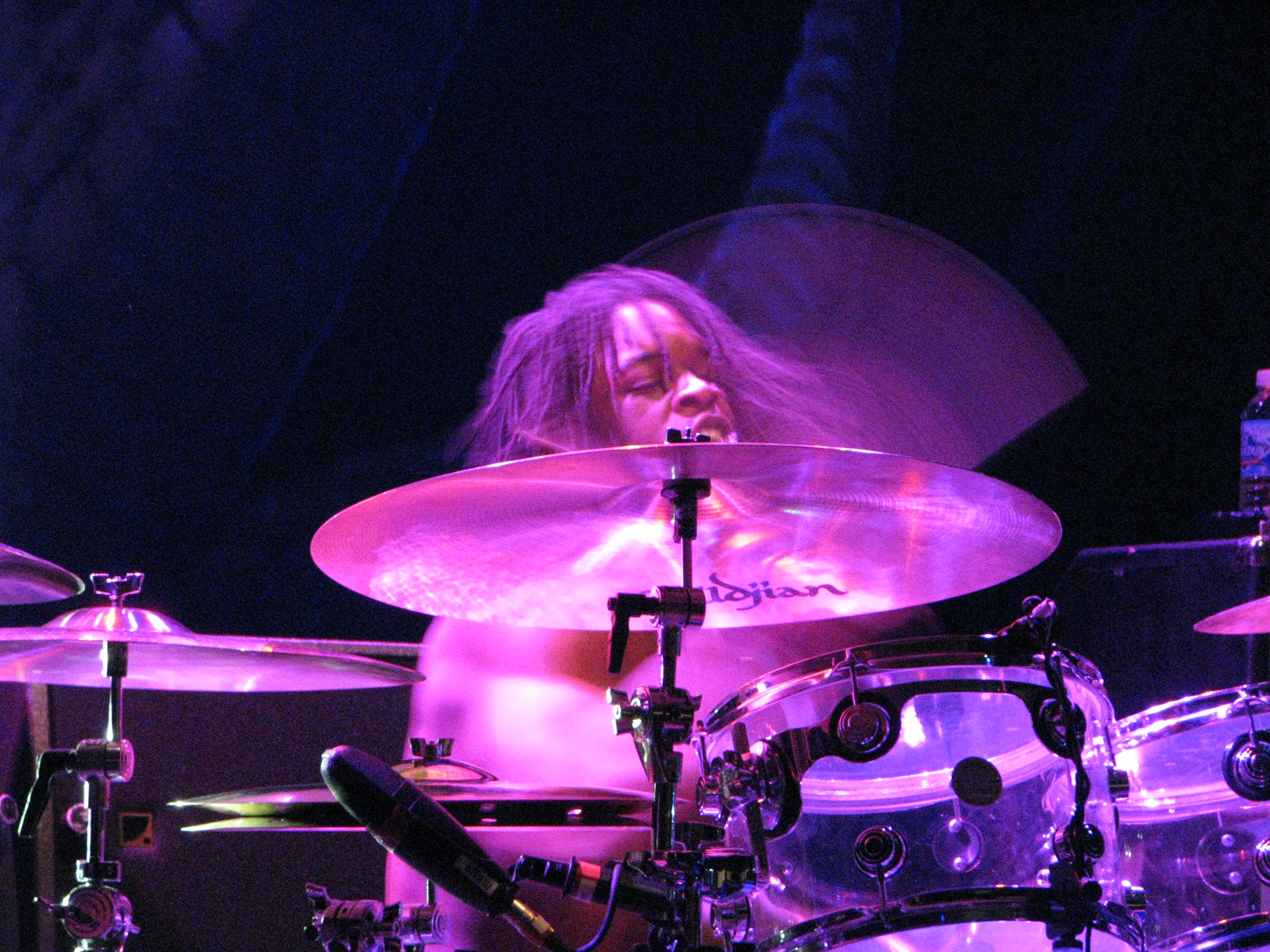
Thomas Pridgen playing at the Roy Wilkins Auditorium in Saint Paul, Minnesota on April 21, 2008

In 2007, Thomas Pridgen became the new permanent drummer for the band. Pridgen's first full-time appearance was at the March 12 show in New Zealand, where the band debuted the song "Idle Tooth" which was later renamed "Wax Simulacra" for the forthcoming album. After shows in New Zealand and Australia, The Mars Volta toured a few West Coast venues as the headliner, then entered the studio to record their fourth LP, The Bedlam in Goliath. One of these performances was captured in a live concert DVD (which remains unreleased) shot by director Jorge Hernandez Aldana.

Despite finding a permanent drummer and getting the band back on track, the recording and production of the album was reportedly plagued by difficulties related to a bad experience with a Ouija board purchased in a curio shop in Jerusalem. According to Rodríguez-López, their original engineer experienced a nervous breakdown, his studio flooded twice, and both he and mixer Rich Costey claimed that various tracks would disappear at random.

On November 5, 2007, The Mars Volta released a document by Jeremy Robert Johnson titled, "The Mars Volta's Descent into Bedlam: A Rhapsody in Three Parts". The document includes a history of the band and describes the obstacles and inspirations they encountered in the creation of The Bedlam in Goliath. On November 20, 2007 "Wax Simulacra", the first single from the forthcoming album, was released with a cover of "Pulled to Bits" by Siouxsie and the Banshees as the b-side.

The band kicked off their supporting tour with a December 29, 2007 "secret show" at the Echoplex in Los Angeles, California, followed by a special New Year's Eve performance at San Francisco's Bill Graham Civic Auditorium. That night they played their first ever acoustic set, which included six songs and a live performance of "Miranda, That Ghost Just Isn't Holy Anymore". The band then departed on a club tour of the U.S. east coast throughout January, with an album release show at San Diego's Soma, followed by another month's worth of European dates from mid-February to mid-March.

On January 2, 2008, The Mars Volta released an online game called "Goliath: The Soothsayer", based on a true story that inspired their forthcoming album The Bedlam In Goliath. The album chronicles the band's purported experience with the "Soothsayer", a Ouija board owned by vocalist Cedric Bixler-Zavala and its transition from a source of fun on tour to a psycho-spiritual force that almost tore the band apart. The game was available for a limited time exclusively via Amazon.com.

On January 17, 2008, the band made their U.S. network television debut, performing "Wax Simulacra" on the Late Show with David Letterman (Rodríguez-López, Bixler-Zavala and Hinojos had appeared on the show with At the Drive-In in 2000). On January 22, they made a surprise appearance at Toronto, Ontario, Canada's MTV Live studios, where they performed "Wax Simulacra" and an extended version of "Goliath". In late January, the new album debuted at a career-best No. 3 on the Billboard 200.

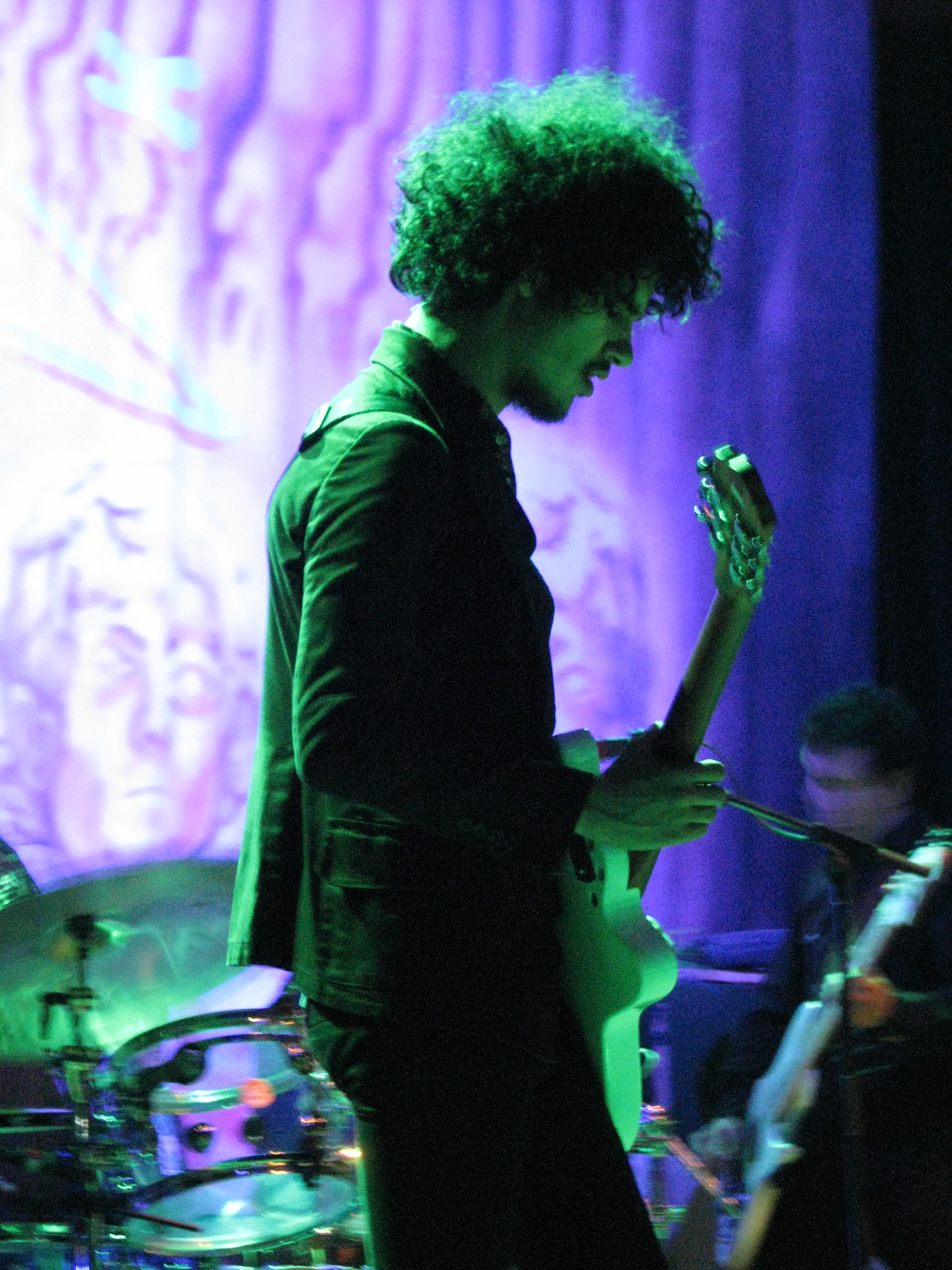
Omar Rodríguez-López playing at the Roy Wilkins Auditorium in Saint Paul, Minnesota on April 21, 2008

The song "Wax Simulacra" won the 2009 Grammy Award for Best Hard Rock Performance. It was the band's first nomination and win. The band members thanked their families and Bixler urged people not to forget the memories of the recently departed Lux Interior and Ron Asheton.

=== Octahedron (2009–2010) ===
Omar Rodríguez-López had discussed the band's next album as early as January 2008, the month that The Bedlam in Goliath was released, claiming "I consider it to be our acoustic album." Cedric Bixler-Zavala had expressed an urge for the album to not be released on a major label. In February 2009, Rodríguez-López claimed "the next two Mars Volta records are already recorded and waiting for a release date."

On April 14, 2009, The Mars Volta announced their fifth studio album, entitled Octahedron. It was released June 23 in the United States and June 22 in the rest of the world. A vinyl version was released on July 21 in a limited edition of 500 LPs. In the spirit of distillation of the band's sound, Rodríguez-López asked woodwind player/percussionist Adrián Terrazas-González and live rhythm guitarist/sound manipulator Paul Hinojos to leave. Regarding their departure, percussionist Marcel Rodríguez-López noted that: "it's like we got a whole new band. It's two less members – we got to play differently."

The first single released in North America was "Since We've Been Wrong". The first European single was "Cotopaxi".

An excerpt from The Mars Volta's performance at the All Tomorrow's Parties, UK 2005 A Nightmare Before Christmas festival was featured in the All Tomorrow's Parties film, which was released in cinemas during October 2009.

During the Octahedron tour, the show on October 23 in Raleigh, NC was unexpectedly cancelled. It was supposed to be the final show of the North American leg of the tour, but was cancelled due to an argument between Bixler-Zavala and Thomas Pridgen, the drummer at the time, which ended with Pridgen abruptly leaving the venue. A month later, Pridgen confirmed his departure from The Mars Volta via Facebook stating he was "not in TMV anymore". In a February 2011 interview, Pridgen said he left the group "because the singer had a jealous ego trip. There's nothing more to elaborate on"; however, Juan Alderete stated in 2013 that "Thomas got really drunk, did some bad things and did some real damage to the trust we all had with him." The band later completed the tour with drummer Dave Elitch. They played throughout Europe and Australia until the end of January 2010.

In October 2010, The Mars Volta played two shows in Brazil and Chile. Long-time keyboardist, Ikey Owens, was absent during these dates due to touring commitments with his own project, Free Moral Agents.

=== Noctourniquet (2011–2012) ===
Shortly after Octahedron's release, Rodríguez-López claimed to have put the supposed follow-up "on hold" and was starting work on a completely new album. In an April 2010 interview with Rolling Stone, Rodríguez-López talked about trying to loosen his grip in the studio. He claimed to have finished writing the album, and was awaiting lyrics and vocals from Bixler-Zavala. Rodríguez-López spent most of 2010 focusing on his solo career, and little information regarding the sixth Mars Volta album was released. During this year drummer Deantoni Parks began touring with Rodríguez-López as well as appearing on several solo records, and Cathy Pellow of Sargent House Records confirmed that Parks was in talks to become the next drummer for The Mars Volta.

In 2011, Rodríguez-López spoke about the band's new album in several interviews, saying that it would feature thirteen songs which, "[are] a simplified version of what we've done before", and would be released "Whenever the record label decides to put it out". Bixler-Zavala took the opportunity to make a few remarks on the sound of the album, indicating a drastic change in sound for the band, referring to the new sound as "future punk".

On March 19, 2011, the Omar Rodriguez-Lopez Group performed at SXSW. Bixler-Zavala joined the group as a vocalist, performing entirely new material with the band, which led to speculations of the show being a secret Mars Volta show under the Omar Rodríguez-López Group moniker. The Group continued to tour throughout April with the same lineup of Bixler-Zavala, Omar and Marcel Rodríguez-López, Juan Alderete, Deantoni Parks and (previously offstage) keyboardist/sound manipulator Lars Stalfors. An official Mars Volta tour began in summer of 2011, consisting of them opening for Soundgarden on select dates. This was in addition to their opening slot for the Red Hot Chili Peppers in their one-off gig in Hong Kong on August 9, 2011. During these shows the band (featuring the same six members) continued to play the new material premiered during the Omar Rodríguez-López Group tour earlier in the year, with Bixler-Zavala telling the crowd at one show that he was "inviting them to a private rehearsal for their new album," confirming the material was off the band's upcoming album.

Keyboardist Ikey Owens, who had played with the band since its inception, was noticeably absent from all 2011 dates. When asked in an interview, Owens stated that he knew "Absolutely nothing [of the upcoming album]. I haven't heard one note of it; I haven't played on it. I don't know if I am going to play on it; I have no idea". Bassist Juan Alderete later revealed via his Twitter page that Owens was no longer playing with The Mars Volta as he was busy "producing bands". Marcel Rodríguez-López and Lars Stalfors took over keyboard and synth duties with the band in lieu of Owens.

On January 5, 2012, a new song titled "Zed and Two Naughts", a song revealed to be from the band's upcoming album, was confirmed to be included on the MLB 12: The Show Soundtrack.

On January 12, it was revealed that the upcoming album would be called Noctourniquet. Later that week, an official page went up confirming Noctourniquet as the album title along with unveiling the album art and a full track listing and announcing March 27, 2012, as the release date. The album's first single, "The Malkin Jewel," was first broadcast on February 13 and subsequently released on February 14.

=== Hiatus, breakup, and reunion rumors (2013–2021) ===
After the conclusion of the Noctourniquet tour, Omar Rodríguez-López decided to put The Mars Volta on hold to fully concentrate on his new project, Bosnian Rainbows, which also features Deantoni Parks. When asked in an interview if the band will reunite, he stated:

I don't know, and I'm not insecure enough to have to ask myself that. It's like, we've done that for ten years, eleven years. Now we're all doing different things, and everything that we're doing informs how we express ourselves, and so if that happens then it happens and if it doesn't it doesn't. It's not something to be worried about. It shouldn't occupy a space in the mind. There's way too many things that are much too important to occupy space in the mind.

On January 23, 2013, Cedric Bixler-Zavala revealed that he was no longer a part of The Mars Volta on Twitter and that the band had broken up.

Bixler-Zavala subsequently focused on his solo music and eventually formed a new band, Zavalaz, which also includes Juan Alderete. He stated shortly after that he was "currently not on speaking terms" with Rodríguez-López and that "the falling out had been four years in the making, so the final announcement on my part was really just to let the children know that Mom and Dad were splitting up".

Rodríguez-López, meanwhile, did not rule out the possibility of The Mars Volta reuniting in the future: "Because of all my anger and how I dealt with people, I spent so much of my life just closing doors left and right. At this point, I refuse to close any, only to open new ones. Whatever comes my way - as long as it's filled with joy and positivity - I want to give my talents to it. [...] I'm not interested in throwing tantrums any more." He elaborated further on an article with Billboard, acknowledging Bixler-Zavala's decision to depart TMV, effectively ending the over 20 year musical partnership between Rodríguez-López and Bixler-Zavala for the foreseeable future. Rodríguez-López stated, "I was making a film and heard about it hours later; people were like, 'Are you OK?' I understand where he's coming from; I've known the guy for 22 years. I'll always respect and support any decision he makes. If that's how he wants it, I totally get it and I support it."

In August 2013, a collection of unreleased songs, demos, alternate versions, and in-studio jams roughly spanning from 2005 until the Noctourniquet sessions, dubbed The Ramrod Tapes, was leaked online. The source of these recordings still remains unknown.

In February 2014, several posts on the Comatorium message board by sources close to the band revealed that Bixler-Zavala and Rodríguez-López had been meeting and speaking again, hinting at a possible Mars Volta reunion. The rumors were further fueled when Bixler-Zavala's wife Chrissie posted a picture on Instagram of her husband and Rodríguez-López holding Bixler's twin boys at a California beach. On April 9, a new project featuring Rodríguez-López and Bixler-Zavala, Antemasque was announced; Antemasque also featured Flea on bass and Dave Elitch on drums.

On October 14, 2014, founding member Isaiah "Ikey" Owens was found dead in his hotel room while on tour in Mexico with Jack White. According to a representative, Owens died of a heart attack.

In an interview with Rolling Stone on July 11, 2016, when asked about a potential return of The Mars Volta, Rodriguez-Lopez stated, "At some point, we'd love to do [Mars Volta] again too, you know what I mean? There's so much to do there as well." In February 2018, Bixler-Zavala confirmed on Twitter that The Mars Volta will "be back soon", but later clarified that At the Drive-In activity will take precedence for the immediate future. In May 2019, further tweeting from Bixler-Zavala suggested he and Rodríguez-López had been experimenting with new material.

On February 23, 2021, Hamburg based label Clouds Hill Group announced they had acquired rights to handle the band's discography, as well as Omar Rodriguez-Lopez' entire back catalogue, with official reissues of both discographies expected.

On March 4, 2021, Clouds Hill posted a video on Twitter titled 'Coming Soon', featuring audio from De-Loused in the Comatorium, as well as alternate artwork of the album cover. This was later confirmed as the 18-LP box set of the band's entire discography titled La Realidad De Los Sueños (The Reality of Dreams), including unreleased material from the De-Loused in the Comatorium sessions titled Landscape Tantrums. The set was released on April 23, 2021.

=== Reunion and subsequent albums (2022–present) ===
On June 18, 2022, the band revealed the coordinates to a location in Los Angeles, California, where fans were allowed to preview new music from the band via an art installation called "L'ytome Hodorxí Telesterion". This was followed up by the release of the single "Blacklight Shine" and a tour announcement, marking both their first new music and first live shows in ten years. The band released a follow-up single "Graveyard Love" on July 8. The band subsequently announced their first album in 10 years, The Mars Volta, which was released on September 16. On March 10, 2023, the band announced an acoustic version of their self-titled album titled Que Dios Te Maldiga Mi Corazón, which released on April 21.

A documentary film, Omar and Cedric: If This Ever Gets Weird, which chronicles Omar and Cedric's friendship across several decades, premiered at select film festivals in 2023 and 2024. Directed by Nicolas Jack Davies, the film received a one-day cinematic release on November 20, 2024, across the US.

Beginning on February 25, 2025, the band played an entire unreleased new album during their sets opening for Deftones' arena tour. The Mars Volta's ninth studio album, Lucro Sucio; Los Ojos del Vacío, was officially announced by the Clouds Hill label on April 7, and released on April 11. On November 25, 2025, producer Sylvia Massy shared a picture with her, Rodriguez-Lopez, and Bixler-Zavala, stating that the duo, along with Jon DeBaun, stopped by her studio to work on their "new record." Bixler-Zavala confirmed he was tracking new material the following day on his Instagram story.

On June 8, 2026, a 24-hour countdown appeared on the band's website. The following day, fans were prompted to vote for their favorite performance of "Enlazan las Tinieblas" out of three snippets of the song played during their tour the previous year. Fans would ultimately choose what songs would comprise the live album Lucro Sucio; Unfinished Business, set for release on November 20, 2026, delayed from its initial September 4 release date. Concurrently, the band embarked on a brief, career-spanning US tour in September 2026, after exclusively performing Lucro Sucio material the previous year.

== Musical style and influences ==
The band's music has been described as progressive rock and experimental rock.

The band's music includes elements from a wide variety of genres, including hardcore, psychedelic rock, and free jazz. Omar Rodríguez-López commented, "Progressive is not a dirty word for people to use about us. If you're not moving forward, you're stagnant. And that's no way to live." Almost the entire band's output was composed solely by Rodríguez-López, with lyrics and vocal melodies written by Cedric Bixler-Zavala. They cited artists/bands such as King Crimson, Led Zeppelin, Pink Floyd, Van der Graaf Generator, Can, Captain Beefheart, Frank Zappa, Larry Harlow, Yes, Miles Davis, Fela Kuti, Ennio Morricone, Throbbing Gristle, Talk Talk, A Tribe Called Quest, Black Flag, Brainiac, Björk, Roni Size, Jaga Jazzist and Aphex Twin as their influences. According to Rodríguez-López, cinema also largely influences his songwriting: "Creating tension, creating flow, creating scenes, creating fast-paced scenes, creating minimal dialogue – it's one of our biggest influences".

== Legacy ==
Many artists and bands have cited The Mars Volta as an influence, including Mastodon, Lizzo, Protest the Hero, Nick Hipa of As I Lay Dying, The Fall of Troy, Trivium, Danny Marino of The Agonist, Tor Oddmund Suhrke of Leprous, Jonathan Nido of The Ocean, Mutiny on the Bounty, The Old Dead Tree, Canvas Solaris, and Syriak of Unexpect.

A number of other artists have been quoted expressing admiration for their work such as Neil Peart of Rush, Tool, Steven Wilson of Porcupine Tree, James Hetfield of Metallica, Holger Czukay of Can, Mike Portnoy of Dream Theater, Lil B, and Kanye West.

In 2008, they were named Best Prog-Rock Band by Rolling Stone magazine.

== Band members ==
According to the liner notes for Amputechture, The Bedlam in Goliath, Octahedron, Noctourniquet and The Mars Volta: "The partnership between Omar Rodríguez-López & Cedric Bixler-Zavala is The Mars Volta. These compositions are then performed by The Mars Volta Group."

=== Current line-up ===
Image	Name	Years active	Instruments	Release contributions
	Omar Rodríguez-López	2001–2012; 2019–present	guitar; direction; backing vocals; synthesizers; keyboards	all releases
	Cedric Bixler-Zavala	2001–2012; 2019–present	lead vocals	all releases
	Eva Gardner	2001–June 2002; 2019–present	bass guitar; double bass	Tremulant (2002); The Mars Volta (2022); Que Dios Te Maldiga Mi Corazón (2023); Lucro Sucio; Los Ojos del Vacio (2025); Lucro Sucio; Unfinished Business (2026)
	Marcel Rodríguez-López	October 2003–2012; 2019–present	percussion (October 2003–2010, 2019–present); synthesizers and keyboards (2005–2012, 2019–present)	all releases from Frances the Mute (2005) onwards (credit only on Noctourniquet)
	Leo Genovese	2022–present	keyboards; piano; saxophone	all releases from The Mars Volta (2022) onwards
	Linda-Philomène Tsoungui	2022–present	drums	all releases from Lucro Sucio (Los Ojos del Vacio) (2025) onwards
	Teri Gender Bender	2025–present	backing vocals	Lucro Sucio; Unfinished Business (2026)

=== Touring members ===
- Josh Moreau - bass guitar (September 2022–April 2025; filling in for Eva Gardner, Played on Lucro Sucio; Los Ojos del Vacio)

=== Former contributors ===
Image	Name	Years active	Instruments	Release contributions
	Jeremy Ward	2001–May 2003 (until his death)	sound manipulation	Tremulant (2002); De-Loused in the Comatorium (2003); Octahedron (2009); Landscape Tantrums (2021)
	Isaiah "Ikey" Owens	2001–June 2002; October 2002–2010 (died 2014)	keyboards	all releases from Tremulant (2002) to Octahedron (2009) (credit only on Octahedron)
	Blake Fleming	March–August 2001; July–October 2006	drums	none
	Jon Theodore	August 2001–July 2006	drums	all releases from Tremulant (2002) to Amputechture (2006)
	John Frusciante	2002–2009; 2024; (in studio) (2003–2006 occasional live performances)	guitars	De-Loused in the Comatorium (2003); Frances the Mute (2005); Amputechture (2006); The Bedlam in Goliath (2008); Octahedron (2009); Lucro Sucio; Los Ojos del Vacio (2025) engineering
	Ralph Jasso	June 2002–October 2002	bass	Landscape Tantrums (uncredited)
	Linda Good	June 2002–October 2002	keyboards	Landscape Tantrums (uncredited)
	Flea	2002 (in studio for De-Loused in the Comatorium sessions, also recorded trumpet in 2004 for Frances the Mute)	bass	De-Loused in the Comatorium (2003); Frances the Mute (2005)
	Jason Lader	January–April 2003	bass	none
	Juan Alderete	April 2003–2012	bass	all releases from Live (2003) to Noctourniquet (2012)
	Paul Hinojos	2005–2008; 2003 (live offstage)	sound manipulation; live guitar (2006–2008)	Scabdates (2005); Amputechture (2006); The Bedlam in Goliath (2008)
	Adrián Terrazas-González	2005–2008 (2004 in studio for Frances the Mute sessions)	woodwind; percussion	Frances the Mute (2005); Scabdates (2005); Amputechture (2006); The Bedlam in Goliath (2008)
	Deantoni Parks	September–November 2006; 2010–2012	drums	Noctourniquet (2012)
	Thomas Pridgen	October 2006; December 2006–October 2009	drums	The Bedlam in Goliath (2008); Octahedron (2009)
	Dave Elitch	November 2009 – October 2010	drums	none
	Henry Trejo	2009–2010 (some live songs offstage)	acoustic guitar	Scabdates (2005) crew; The Bedlam in Goliath (2008) voice
	Lars Stalfors	2011	keyboards; sound manipulation	Octahedron (2009) engineering; Noctourniquet (2012) production
	Willy Rodriguez	2019–2021 (in studio for The Mars Volta sessions)	drums	The Mars Volta (2022); Lucro Sucio; Los Ojos del Vacio (2025)
	Daniel Diaz Rivera	2022–2023 (in studio)	percussion	The Mars Volta (2022); Que Dios Te Maldiga Mi Corazón (2023); Lucro Sucio; Los Ojos del Vacio (2025)

== Discography ==
- De-Loused in the Comatorium (2003)
- Frances the Mute (2005)
- Amputechture (2006)
- The Bedlam in Goliath (2008)
- Octahedron (2009)
- Noctourniquet (2012)
- The Mars Volta (2022)
- Que Dios Te Maldiga Mi Corazón (2023)
- Lucro Sucio; Los Ojos del Vacio (2025)
