= Filomena Margaiz =

Mexican politician (born 1968)

- Born: 29 November 1968 (age 57); San Miguel de Allende, Guanajuato, Mexico
- Education: Celaya Institute of Technology; UNIVA
- Occupation: Politician
- Political party: PAN

Filomena Margaiz Ramírez (born 29 November 1968) is a Mexican politician affiliated with the National Action Party. As of 2014 she served as Senator of the LVIII and LIX Legislatures of the Mexican Congress representing Guanajuato.
