= Santa Filomena, Mosciano Sant'Angelo =

Coordinates: 42.7378°N 13.8802°E

Santa Filomena (Mosciano Sant'angelo)
- Frazione
- Interactive map of Santa Filomena (Mosciano Sant'angelo)
- Country: Italy
- Region: Abruzzo
- Province: Teramo
- Time zone: UTC+1 (CET)
  - Summer (DST): UTC+2 (CEST)

Santa Filomena (Mosciano Sant'angelo) is a frazione in the Province of Teramo in the Abruzzo region of Italy.
