= Filomena Valenzuela Goyenechea =

Chilean soldier

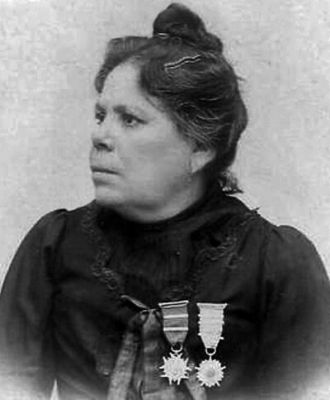
Filomena Valenzuela Goyenechea

Lieutenant Filomena Valenzuela Goyenechea (c. 1848–1924) was a Chilean soldier (originally from Copiapó), known as La Madrecita. Originally a cantinière, she came to participate directly in combat in the Battle of Pisagua, Battle of Dolores and Battle of Los Ángeles during the War of the Pacific. she was also known to nurse and care for sick and injured soldiers.

Due to her performance in battle, she was promoted to the rank of second lieutenant.
