= Philomena Essed =

Surinamese–Dutch professor (born 1955)

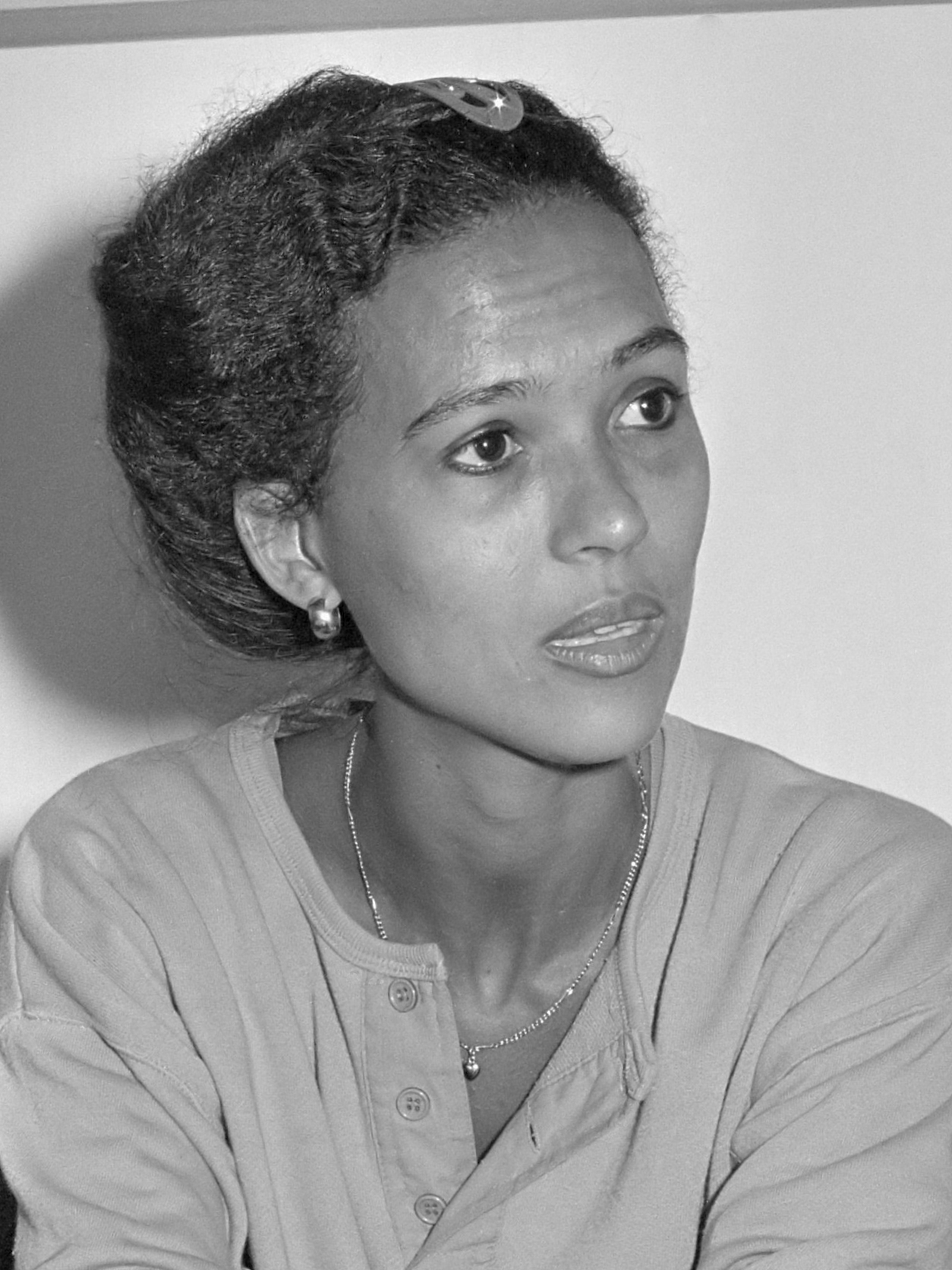
- Essed at the beginning of her career (Amsterdam, 1984)
- Born: 1955 (age 70–71); Utrecht, Netherlands
- Occupations: Writer, academic
- Years active: 1990–present
- Notable work: Everyday Racism

Philomena Johanna Maria Essed (born Utrecht, 1955) is a professor of Critical Race, Gender and Leadership Studies at Antioch University Yellow Springs, Ohio.

== Biography ==
Essed's parents are Surinamese. Her father Max Essed was a pediatrician. She grew up in Suriname and the Netherlands. From the age of fifteen she lived in Nijmegen, until moving in 1974 to Amsterdam.

== Career ==
In 1983, Essed passed her doctoral exams in cultural anthropology at the University of Amsterdam, and received her PhD cum laude in the social sciences in 1990 under the supervision of Chris Mullard.

She worked at the University of Amsterdam from receiving her doctorate until 2003. She was a member of the Dutch Tijdelijke Expertise Commissie Emancipatie in het Nieuwe Adviesstelsel (Temporary Expert Committee on Emancipation in the New Advisory System) from 1998 to 2001, appointed by the Dutch Ministry of Social Affairs and Employment. She served as a deputy member of the Netherlands Institute for Human Rights (College voor de Rechten van de Mens) from 2004 to 2016. Between 2001 and 2005, she was a visiting professor at the University of California, Irvine. In 2005, she became a professor at Antioch University. She has also held visiting positions at Umeå University and the University of Johannesburg, and has served as faculty at the Black Europe Summer School since 2008.

== Everyday Racism ==
Essed is primarily known for her books Alledaags racisme (1984) and Understanding Everyday Racism: An Interdisciplinary Theory (1990). The latter, following its Dutch translation in 1991 (as Inzicht in alledaags racisme), created a strong reaction in the Dutch public debate.

== Recognition ==
Essed received honorary doctorates from the University of Pretoria in 2011 and Umeå University in 2015.

In 2011, she was made a knight in the Order of Orange-Nassau.

== Published works ==
- Alledaags racisme, 1984
- Understanding Everyday Racism: An Interdisciplinary Theory (Inzicht in Alledaags Racisme), dissertation, 1990
- Everyday Racism. Reports From Women of Two Cultures. Hunter House, 1990
- Diversity. Gender, Color and Culture, University of Massachusetts Press, 1996
- Refugees and the Transformation of Societies, with David Theo Goldberg, 2004
- A Companion to Gender Studies, with David Theo Goldberg, 2009
- Clones, Fakes and Posthumans: Cultures of Replication, Rodopi/Brill, 2012
- Dutch Racism, with Isabel Hoving, 2015
