= Linda-Philomène Tsoungui =

German musician

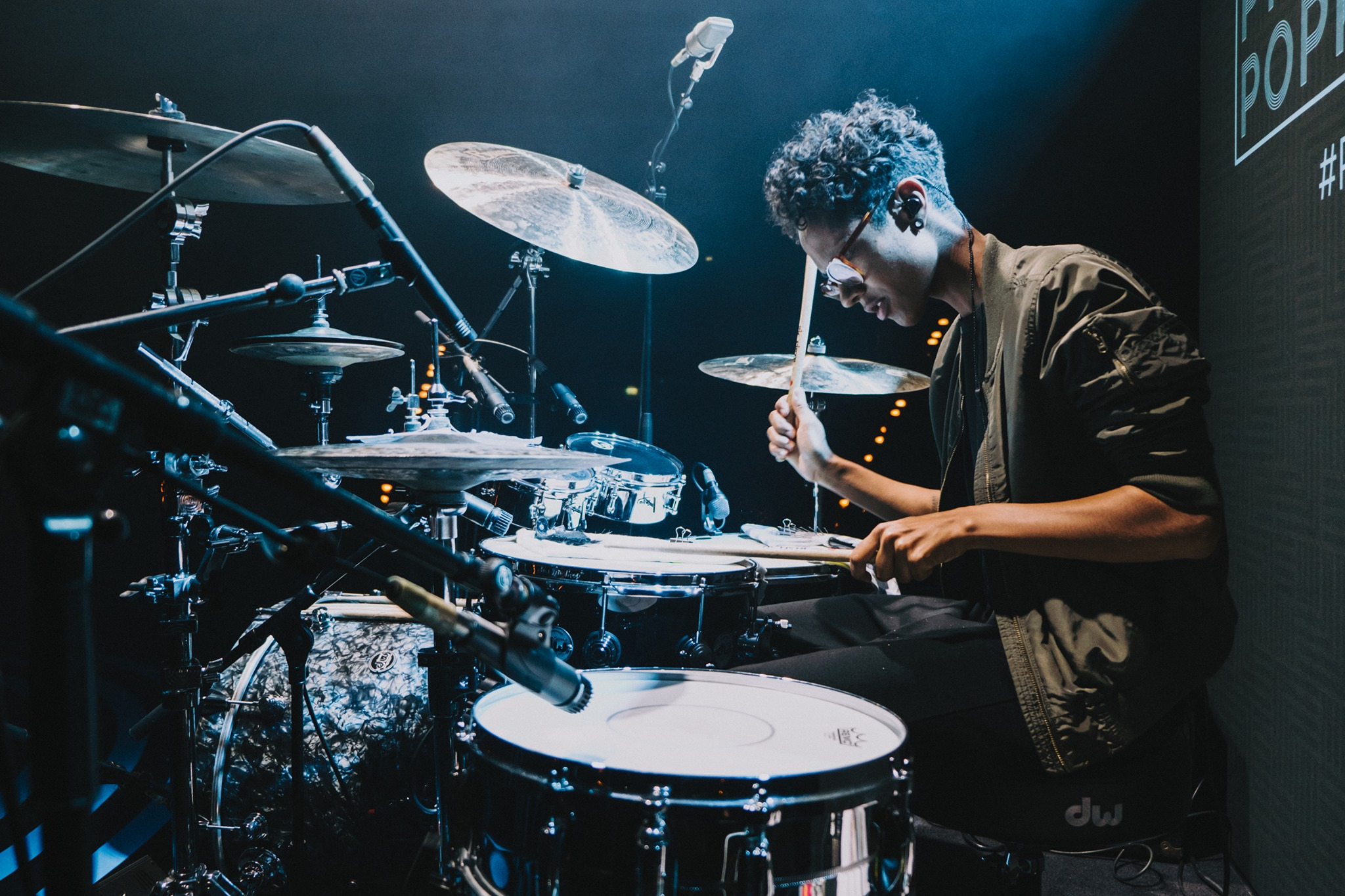
- Tsoungui in 2019

Background information
- Born: Linda-Philomène Tsoungui; 1992 (age 33–34); Plauen, Germany
- Genres: Progressive rock; rap rock; jazz rock
- Instrument: Drums
- Years active: 2011–present

Linda-Philomène Tsoungui (born 1992) is a German drummer, percussionist, and music producer. They have been the drummer for The Mars Volta since ~2022, as well as several German acts, including singer Mine, rapper Fatoni, and rapper Chefket.

== Life and career ==
Tsoungui was born in Plauen, Germany to a Cameroonian father and the German opera singer Annett Tsoungui. At the age of six, they moved with their parents to Hof, where they later attended the musically oriented Jean-Paul-Gymnasium high school. They initially received piano lessons before switching to drums, studying under Claudio Estay and Johannes Potzel.

From 2011 to 2015, they studied classical percussion at the Hochschule für Musik und Theater München with Peter Sadlo and Bastian Jütte. During their studies, they participated in various ensembles, including the Munich-Percussion-Ensemble, which led them to concert tours in Egypt, Azerbaijan, and Oman. In 2014, they performed in the ensemble for the production of Bernd Alois Zimmermann's opera Die Soldaten at the Bavarian State Opera under Kyrill Petrenko. They also collaborated with Martin Grubinger, Kent Nagano, and Steve Reich. They were a scholarship recipient of the Neue Franz Liszt Stiftung and the Yehudi Menuhin Foundation LiveMusicNow.

After earning their bachelor's degree, Tsoungui studied jazz drumming in Munich for two semesters before starting their master's in Popular Music with a focus on Performance Art at the Popakademie Baden-Württemberg in 2016. There, they studied under Claus Heßler and Udo Dahmen. Their master's thesis was titled "Ich bin zu für Dich" – "How the Capitalization of Femininity Constitutes the Success of German Female Rappers."

Tsoungui has played for numerous bands and artists, including Antonia Dering's SiEA, Tiger Tiger, Madanii, Evelinn Trouble, Donskoy, Elif, and Seba Kaapstad. They are currently the drummer for Mine, Fatoni, Chefket, Mal Élevé, Moli, and Lxandra.

In August 2017, they toured China and Hong Kong with the Hong Kong-based producer and singer Khalil Fong.

Since 2019, they have been the musical director for Fatoni, with they toured Germany in the fall of 2019.

Since 2022, they have been touring as the drummer for The Mars Volta.

== Teaching ==
Tsoungui has taught for "Online Lessons TV" and was a jury member of the "Austrian Drummer Awards" in 2018.

In September 2019, they gave their first clinic at the Dresden "Drum and Bass Festival" focusing on electronic production and drumming in a band context.

== Selected discography ==
- Tiger Tiger: O Trust (2019)
- Mine: Klebstoff (2019)
- The Mars Volta: Lucro Sucio; Los Ojos del Vacío (2025)
- The Mars Volta: Lucro Sucio; Unfinished Business (2026) Rodriguez Lopez Productions
