= Taking Back Control =

Single by Sparta

from the album Threes
- Released: September 25, 2006
- Genre: Alternative rock
- Length: 3:40
- Label: EMI/Hollywood
- Songwriter(s): Tony Hajjar, Keeley Davis, Matt Miller, Jim Ward

"Taking Back Control" is a single by the rock band Sparta. It is one of their most well-known songs and the first single from the album Threes. The song was a chart success, performing decently on both Billboard's Alternative Songs and Mainstream Rock chart.

It has been featured in the video game Madden NFL 07 (titled as "Future Needs") and the movie The Invisible.

== Background ==
A demo version of the song, titled "Future Needs", was included on the Madden NFL 07 soundtrack; this version features different lyrics and a changed chorus.

== Track listing ==
Digital single
No.	Title	Writer(s)	Length
1.	"Taking Back Control"	Keeley Davis; Tony Hajjar; Matt Miller; Jim Ward	3:40

== Chart performance ==
Chart (2007)	Peak position
US Alternative Airplay (Billboard)	25
US Mainstream Rock (Billboard)	24
