= Sleepercar =

Alternative country music group

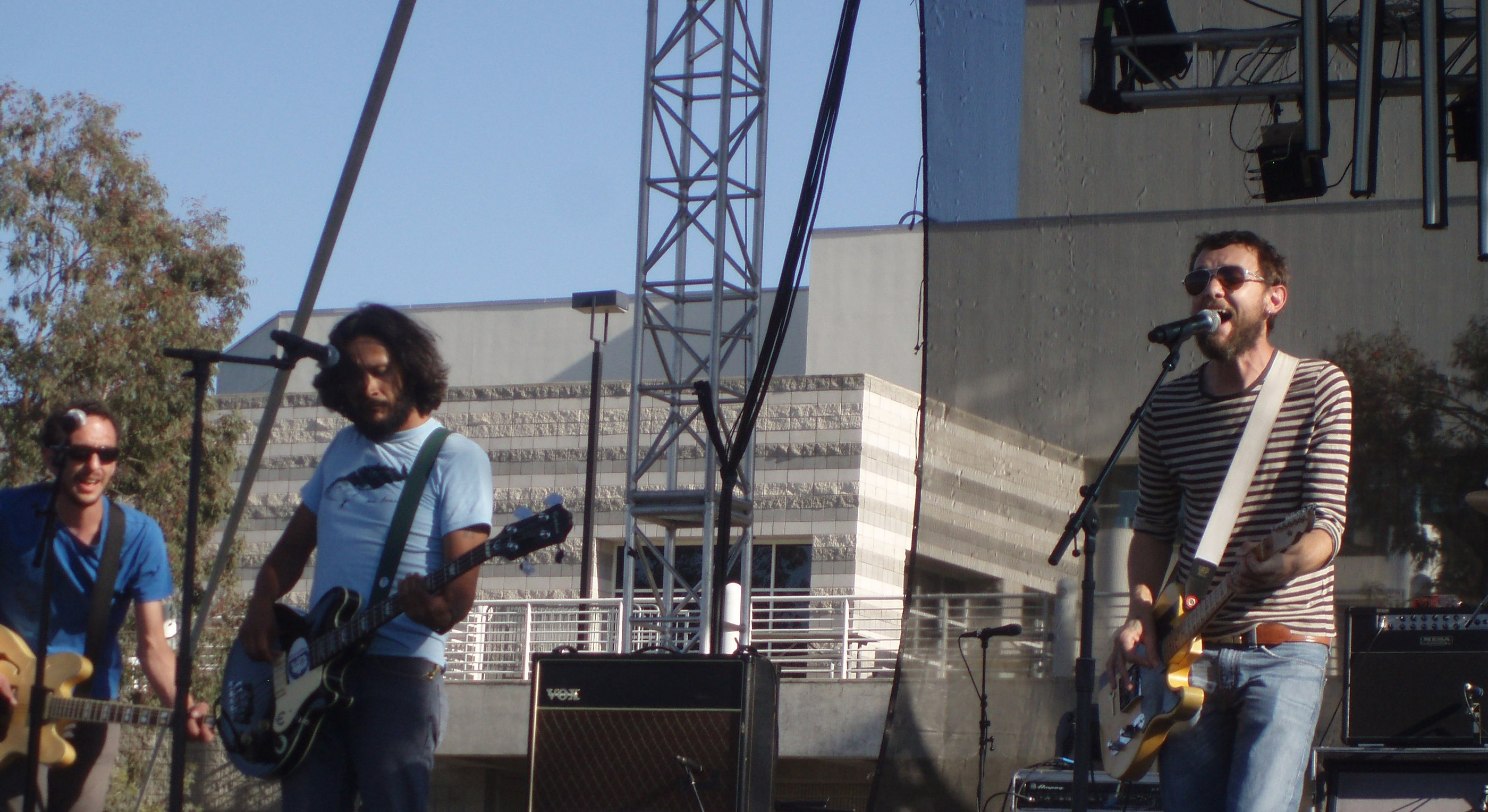

Background information
- Origin: El Paso, Texas, USA
- Genres: Country rock Alternative country Americana
- Years active: 2002–present
- Labels: Civil Defense League; Doghouse Records
- Members: Jim Ward; Chris Heinrich; Matthew Schmitz; Gabriel Gonzalez; Greg Sosa; Mathew Gardner; Benjamin Morgan
- Past members: Micah Adams; Clint Myers; Clay Anderson; Jeff Ward
- Website: http://sleepercarmusic.com/

Sleepercar is the alternative country project of Jim Ward, a member of Sparta and former member of At the Drive-In. Regarding the band, Ward has noted that: "I think it will always be 'my' band. People can come and go as they please: I don’t want the stress of trying to maintain five or six happinesses, I love playing with the guys and when they want to move on, I will support them in whatever ways I can."

== Career ==
Sleepercar's beginning can be traced back to the end of At the Drive-In. The oldest Sleepercar song, "Fences Down", was written during a sound check at one of At the Drive-In's last shows. After the band had parted ways, Ward had expressed interest in the genre of alt-country and thought about starting a band to pursue it. However, Sparta was formed and it became the main focus. During down time between Sparta albums and tours, Ward worked on finishing Sleepercar material. It would take several writing sessions before the songs had achieved their final incarnations. During these sessions, Ward was introduced to Chris Heinrich. Heinrich would go on to perform pedal steel guitar on the Sparta album Threes, ukulele on Ward's Quiet EP, and finally pedestal for Sleepercar. Micah Adams (guitar), Clint Myers (drums), Ward's father Jeff Ward (bass), and Gabriel Gonzalez (piano) rounded out the line-up during the early practices. Gonzalez has also performed in Sparta during the band's earlier tours for Wiretap Scars.

In 2005, Sleepercar was approached to open a show in El Paso. They would perform with a revised line up now including Matthew Schmitz on drums and Ward's brother in law Clay Anderson on guitar. Videos of this show were taken and have shown up on YouTube.

In the Summer of 2008, the band toured with City and Colour.

In the Fall of 2008, they supported Coldplay on their U.S. tour.

In September 2010, the band's trailer was stolen in San Antonio, with a large amount of gear inside of it. A list of the missing gear was published on their website.

On November 17, 2015, Sleepercar released their newest album, titled Breathe & Count, as a digital download at Tembloroso.com.

== Discography ==
- West Texas – 2008
- Breathe & Count – 2015
