= Cut Your Ribbon =

Single by Sparta

from the album Wiretap Scars
- Released: 2002
- Recorded: 2002
- Genre: Alternative rock, post-hardcore
- Length: 3:04
- Label: DreamWorks Records
- Songwriters: Tony Hajjar, Paul Hinojos, Matt Miller, Jim Ward
- Producer: Jerry Finn

Sparta singles chronology
"Cut Your Ribbon" (2002)	"Air" (2003)

Music video
- "Cut Your Ribbon" on YouTube

"Cut Your Ribbon" is a song by American rock band Sparta. It serves as the first track and debut single off their debut album Wiretap Scars (2002). Another version of this song was released, and it contains many differences, most notably the lyrics. Also, the version of the song off the album has a tone to it that makes the song sound as if it were being performed live. The song received positive reviews from critics praising the instrumentation and vocal performance. The accompanying music video for the song was directed by Sophie Muller.

In an interview, Jim Ward explained that he didn't perform the song live often, describing singing it as "the worst feeling at this age" and the song itself as "incredibly hard to sing."

== Critical reception ==
"Cut Your Ribbon" garnered a positive reception from music critics applauding the band's musicianship and Jim Ward's abilities as lead singer. Pitchfork writer Eric Carr said that the song was "simply splintering, power-hungry rock, showcasing the record's most memorable vocals." Reviewing the album, Steve Appleford of Rolling Stone felt the track "comes closest to the desperate noise of ATDI, with guitarist turned singer Jim Ward nailing a fine, furious scream." Punknews.org writer Daren called it "a strong introduction track. Its complex rhythm and guitars give a feel of things to come." Jason Jackowiak of Splendid described it as "a dynamic call-to-arms that piercingly and intrepidly proclaims Sparta's aural aesthetic. It's brash yet tuneful, angular yet accessible, fiercely experimental yet grounded in the lessons of their punk rock youth."

The song (along with Sans Cosm) was described as a highlight of the album by James H. Griffin of the Birmingham Weekly, though he continued to say that "with the sound so close and the members so freshly removed from ATDI, Sparta only feels like an accomplished, highly competent heavy rock band."

== Track listing ==
Europe CD (Promo)

1. "Cut Your Ribbon" – 3:04
