= Sparta (band) =

American rock band

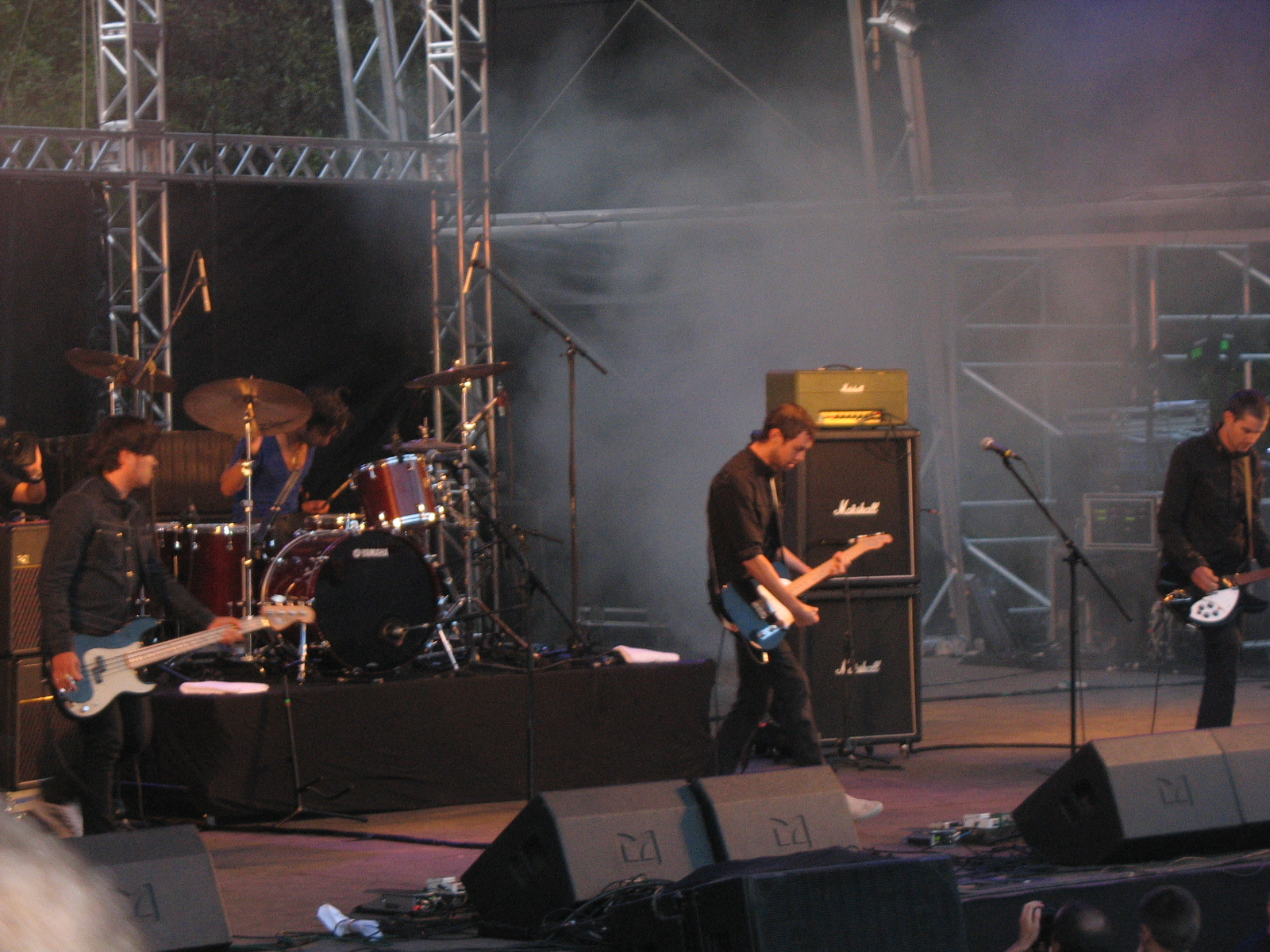
- Sparta live in 2007

Background information
- Origin: El Paso, Texas, U.S.
- Genres: Post-hardcore; art punk; alternative rock
- Years active: 2001–2008; 2011–2013; 2017–present
- Labels: EMI; Geffen; Hollywood; DreamWorks; Equal Vision; Dine Alone
- Spinoffs: Sleepercar
- Spinoff of: At the Drive-In
- Members: Jim Ward; Matt Miller; Neil Hennessy
- Past members: Paul Hinojos; Tony Hajjar; Adam Amparan; Erick Sanger; Keeley Davis; Gabriel Gonzalez; Cully Symington
- Website: sparta.band

Sparta is an American rock band from El Paso, Texas, formed in 2001. The band currently consists of Jim Ward (vocals, guitar), Matt Miller (bass), and drummer Neil Hennessy. Founding members Ward, Paul Hinojos, and Tony Hajjar were members of post-hardcore group At the Drive-In, forming Sparta in 2001 after the break-up of their former band. The band went on hiatus in 2008 for Ward to focus on his solo career and side projects, reuniting from 2011 to 2013 for a series of shows and permanently reuniting in 2017. The band has released six studio albums to date; their fourth, Trust the River, was released in 2020 after a 14-year break between releases. Their most recent album, Cut a Silhouette, was released in May 2026.

Sparta's music has been described by Pitchfork as "anxious, epic guitar rock", and by SPIN Magazine as having "a reliably cathartic and emotionally charged presence".

== History ==
=== Formation and Austere (2001–2002) ===
Post-hardcore band At the Drive-In, which included guitarist Jim Ward, drummer Tony Hajjar and bassist Paul Hinojos, broke up in March 2001. In June of that year, Hajjar and Hinojos met up in Los Angeles and talked about forming a new band. Hinojos returned to El Paso and called Jim Ward to ask if he would be interested in joining the project, soon dubbed Sparta, to which Ward agreed. Hajjar, Hinojos, and Ward had each been writing songs since At the Drive-In's breakup, and eventually came together and practiced for eight days before going into the studio and recording a nine song demo. Those demos were then made available on the band's website.

With Hinojos switching from bass to guitar and Jim Ward stepping into the role of singer-guitarist, the band recruited Matt Miller, a native to El Paso and then bassist of the band Belknap, to permanently fill the position of bassist.

The band opted to approach several major labels, eventually signing to DreamWorks. Sparta saw the label as willing to develop smaller artists and were attracted by their roster, which included AFI and Jimmy Eat World. The band's first EP, entitled Austere, was a joint release between Ward and Hinojos' label Restart Records and Dreamworks, and came out in early 2002. The EP met with mixed reviews, with most believing that the group had talent and the ability, but had yet to find their voice.

=== Wiretap Scars and Live at La Zona Rosa (2002–2004) ===
In August 2002, Sparta released their debut full-length album, Wiretap Scars. The album, although not well received by all of the mainstream post-hardcore audience, brought well-earned respect and relieved some of the pressure brought on by the shadow of At The Drive-In. The record was deemed a cleaner, more accessible sound than ATDI's distortion-fueled offerings. True to their roots, the opening song, "Cut Your Ribbon", was described as "splintering, power-hungry rock", and other tracks such as "Cataract", "Glasshouse Tarot" and "Mye" were noted for their emotion and "absurdly exuberant melody". Sparta maintained its underground following with shows at smaller venues throughout North America and Europe. They were also exposed to a wider audience in April and May 2003, opening several shows for Pearl Jam. While on tour for Wiretap Scars, Sparta employed the help of their friend Gabriel Gonzalez to play third guitar and keyboards; he can be seen in the music videos from 2003's Big Day Out festival, among other videos circulating online. Gonzalez now performs with his own band, Volador, and is a member of Ward's side project Sleepercar. Gonzalez rejoined Sparta in 2017. On May 25, 2003, Ward's cousin, Jeremy, died of a heroin overdose. Jeremy was at the time the sound manipulator for The Mars Volta, created by former At the Drive-In bandmates Cedric Bixler-Zavala and Omar Rodríguez-López, and frontman of De Facto. The loss of his cousin would have a profound and lasting impact on Ward.

The band resumed writing new material, and on March 19, 2004, recorded a live album at La Zona Rosa. The album had seven tracks and six songs, including two previously unrecorded tracks: "Lines in Sand" and "La Cerca". The album captured some of the live performance experience, but was not sold in stores and only available as a promotional CD. Videos for the songs "Cut Your Ribbon", "Mye", and "La Cerca" can be found online, recorded by the music television station Fuse TV.

=== Porcelain and line-up changes (2004–2006) ===
In July 2004, the band released their second album, Porcelain. Despite popular belief, none of the tracks are fueled by the loss of Jeremy Ward (Jim's cousin and sound manipulator for the Mars Volta). Tracks such as "Death in the Family" and "Travel by Bloodline" stem from other personal losses, such as Jim Ward's grandfather and a close friend. In a 2004 issue of the magazine Alternative Press, Ward describes his feelings towards these events, and how they have affected him. "...he will admit that he hasn't yet made sense of it, and, perhaps for that reason, there isn't a song on Porcelain about Jeremy. I don't think I'll ever make peace with that," he says. Immediately prior to the release, Sparta toured as the opening act for Incubus, after which followed their own headlining tour.

In 2005, after pulling the band off the road mid-tour, Ward said he needed to re-group. "I walked out in the middle of a tour.... I needed to get away from everything and everyone. I wasn't enjoying myself at all, and I didn't feel my life or the band was where I wanted it to be... I needed to step back and reassess everything." For two months, he retreated to his home without speaking to anyone in his professional life. In an article with PE.com, Ward said, "When I left, I honestly didn't know if I was going to continue the band or not, so I told everyone to pursue whatever they wanted,". During that time, Hinojos left to join The Mars Volta as their new secondary guitarist and sound manipulator, filling the void left by Jeremy Ward's death. Hinojos was replaced by Keeley Davis.

Eventually, Ward went to visit Hajjar in Los Angeles. They began writing new material without the restrictions of a deadline, and soon Ward had rekindled his desire to perform. In January 2006, the band announced that they had signed a deal with Hollywood Records, and announced their intention to release a short film, titled Eme Nakia, based on Hajjar's experiences as a child in Beirut, Lebanon.

=== Threes and "Eme Nakia" (2006–2008) ===
On March 9, 2006, by way of their official website, Sparta announced a new album, entitled Threes. Two days before the release, the entire album was available for streaming on their MySpace page. The album was released on October 24, 2006. Their first single off the album was "Taking Back Control", and "Erase It Again" was released as the second single in mid-2007.

Davis' first show with the band was at the Viper Room in Los Angeles, in July 2006. However, the band looked at the show as a "warm-up" and the show at Los Angeles' Troubadour, July 29, 2006, was referred to as their "first show to the public in 15 months" by Ward. They played three songs off the upcoming album: "Crawl", "Weather The Storm", and the single "Taking Back Control". At this show Ward also told the crowd about what happened when he left the band the previous year, saying he would rather have the crowd hear it from him, than the press in the following months. Sparta played at Chicago's Lollapalooza festival the following week. The band toured the United States, Canada, Australia and Europe heavily after the release of the album with bands such as Lola Ray, Aloha, As Tall As Lions, Sound Team, Moneen, MeWithoutYou, Lovedrug, Straylight Run, Deftones and My Chemical Romance. On February 19, 2007, the band played a free concert with Lydia Vance in Las Vegas for the XPOZ Coalition, an anti-smoking organization. While touring with Straylight Run and Lovedrug, Sparta allowed Lovedrug to continue touring by letting them use their instruments and equipment after Lovedrug's gear was stolen following a show in Detroit, Michigan.

In conjunction with the album Threes, Sparta also released a 16-minute film entitled "Eme Nakia". The film, the soundtrack for which is performed by Sparta, is about drummer Hajjar's early life, set during the Lebanese civil war of 1975–1990. Hajjar fled at the age of five to the United States, settling in the sprawling west Texas border town of El Paso. When Hajjar was 14, his mother ("Eme") died after a bout with cancer and his father, who had been distant, left the family. His brother, 18 years old at the time, assumed responsibility for the family and raised Hajjar and his sister. The film follows Hajjar's early life story, showing his challenges and ending with him in present day. The independent film received good reviews and is available for free with purchase of the Threes album. The word "Eme" is Arabic for mother, and "Nakia" was Hajjar's mother's name.

=== Hiatus (2008–2011) ===
In June 2008, Ward stated that Sparta is "currently on hiatus and label-less", and that he will be focusing on his project Sleepercar. In January 2009, when asked if a return to Sparta was foreseeable, Ward stated that he has no plans to reunite with his bandmates: "I don't right now, no. Who knows what the future will bring?" In July 2010, sleepercarmusic.com stated that "Sparta is not broken up, Sparta is taking a nap."

=== First return (2011–2013) ===
Following a three-year "nap", Sparta played their first show since 2008 in November 2011 in their hometown of El Paso, Texas. They performed on November 17 and 18 at Tricky Falls, the newly renovated venue co-owned by frontman Jim Ward. The band headed into the studio that fall to begin work on their fourth LP, the follow-up to 2006's Threes. A short tour of the southwestern US followed in May 2012.

Sparta released a new song on May 17, 2012, called "Chemical Feel". The song was free to download, and was the first new song the band had released in six years. In January 2012, At The Drive-In reunited for a series of shows, splitting up once again at the end of the year. In January 2016, At The Drive-In reunited for the second time. However, days before the tour start in March 2016, it was announced that Ward had been replaced in the band by his former Sparta bandmate Keeley Davis.

=== Second return (2017–present) ===
On November 13, 2017, a new line-up was announced, consisting of returning members Ward, Matt Miller and Gabriel Gonzalez, along with former Cursive drummer Cully Symington. A new song, "Graveyard Luck," was released on the same day. Another song, "Cat Scream", was released in April 2018 together with a tour announcement. The band played in several North American cities throughout the rest of 2018.

The band announced the release of the single "Believe" on January 23, 2020, through their Instagram account – along with a new music video and a date for their new album, Trust The River, which was released on April 10, 2020. The band also shared information on a US tour to start in San Francisco on April 23, 2020 – though this was ultimately cancelled in the wake of the COVID-19 pandemic. Both Gonzalez and Symington exited the band in 2021 and were not replaced, converting Sparta into the duo of Ward and Miller. Sparta played their first live shows in over two years at Ward's own restaurant, Eloise, in El Paso across two nights on March 18 and 19, 2022. They later announced a North American tour in support of The Get Up Kids.

In August 2022, Sparta announced their fifth studio album – a self-titled release, which marked the band's first as a duo. Ward and Miller made the album with assistance from members of Thursday and musician Kayleigh Goldsworthy. The band also shared two singles from the album to coincide with the announcement: "Mind Over Matter" and "Spiders". Sparta was released on October 14, 2022, via Dine Alone.

Following a run of touring in which they played Wiretap Scars and then Porcelain in their respective entireties, Neil Hennessy of The Lawrence Arms was officially enlisted as the band's new full-time drummer. In March 2026, the band formally announced their sixth studio album – and first as a trio – entitled Cut a Silhouette. Its lead single, "Crater", was released the same day. The album was released on May 29, 2026 via Equal Vision and Dine Alone Records.

== Band members ==
Current

- Jim Ward – lead vocals, guitar, keyboards (2001–2008, 2011–2013, 2017–present)
- Matt Miller – bass, backing vocals (2001–2008, 2011–2013, 2017–present)
- Neil Hennessy – drums (2024–present; touring 2023–2024)

Former

- Tony Hajjar – drums (2001–2008, 2011–2013)
- Paul Hinojos – guitar, backing vocals (2001–2005)
- Erick Sanger – bass (2001)
- Gabriel Gonzalez – guitar, keyboards (2003, 2017–2021)
- Keeley Davis – guitar, backing vocals (2005–2008, 2011–2013)
- Cully Symington – drums (2017–2021)

== Discography ==
=== Studio albums ===
List of studio albums, with selected chart positions
Title	Year	Peak chart positions	
Title	Year	US	AUS
Wiretap Scars	2002	71	—
Porcelain	2004	60	56
Threes	2006	83	96
Trust the River	2020	—	—
Sparta	2022	—	—
Cut a Silhouette	2026	—	—

=== Live albums ===
- Live at La Zona Rosa 3.19.04 (2004)
- Live 2023 (2024)

=== EPs ===
List of EPs, with selected chart positions
Title	Year	Peak chart positions
Title	Year	AUS
Austere	2002	80

=== Singles ===
List of singles, with selected chart positions
Title	Year	Peak chart positions			Album
Title	Year	US Act. Rock	US Alt.	US Main. Rock	Album
"Cut Your Ribbon"	2002	—	—	—	Wiretap Scars
"Air"	2003	32	—	35	Wiretap Scars
"Breaking the Broken"	2004	—	—	—	Porcelain
"Taking Back Control"	2006	22	25	24	Threes
"Erase It Again"	2007	—	—	—	Threes
"Chemical Feel"	2012	—	—	—	Non-album single
"Graveyard Luck"	2017	—	—	—	Trust the River
"Cat Scream"	2018	—	—	—	Trust the River
"Believe"	2020	—	—	—	Trust the River
"—" denotes a release that did not chart.

=== Music videos ===
- "Cut Your Ribbon" (2002)
- "Air" (2002)
- "Breaking the Broken" (2004)
- "Taking Back Control" (2006)
- "Erase It Again" (2007)
- "Believe" (2020)
- "Miracle" (2020)
- "Turquoise Dream" (2020)
- "Class Blue" (2020)
- "Mind Over Matter" (2022)
- "Crater" (2026)
- "Everything You Say" (2026)
- "Without Your Hands" (2026)

=== Other songs ===
- "Taking Back Control" was featured in the movie The Invisible. In addition to being in the album released for the movie, the music video is a special feature on the DVD release.
- "Each Brave Eye" was released in 2002 as a B-side on the "Cut Your Ribbon" single.
- The band also performed a cover of "Kiss the Bottle" for the Jawbreaker tribute album, Bad Scene, Everyone's Fault.
- The songs "Farewell Ruins" and "Bombs and Us" were released on the Japanese version of Porcelain. "Farewell Ruins" was also released on a 7" vinyl and iTunes. Ward confirmed that "Bombs and Us" was written about the late songwriter Elliott Smith.
- An earlier version of "Taking Back Control", originally titled "Future Needs", appears on the video game Madden NFL 07.
- There are three B-sides for Threes: "As Far As We Go", which was handed out upon purchase of Threes at participating stores, "Blood Spills", an iTunes exclusive, and "Born and Buried," a bonus track on the European version of the album.
- The intro to the song "Cut Your Ribbon" has been used for the show True Life, which can be seen on MTV.

== See also ==
- Engine Down, the former band of Davis
- Denali, the former band of Davis
- Glös, the former band of Davis
