= Maura Davis =

American singer and musician

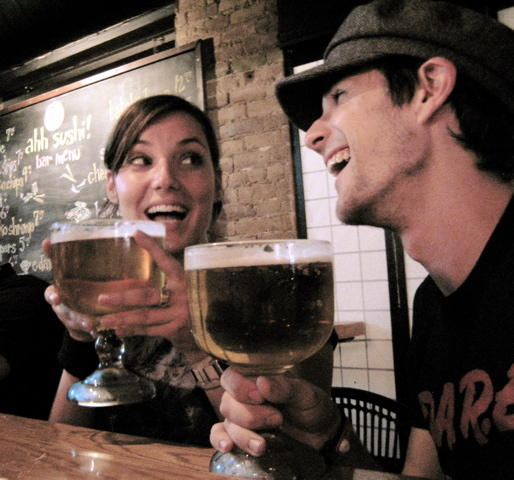
- Davis with her brother Keeley Davis.

Background information
- Genres: Indie rock
- Occupation: Musician
- Instruments: Vocals, keyboards, guitar

Maura Davis is an American singer and musician, most known as the lead singer of the American indie rock band Denali from Richmond, Virginia, United States, active from 2000 to 2004 (with brief reappearances in 2008). She also fronted the alternative group Ambulette, formerly known as Bella Lea, who released an EP on Astralwerks in 2005, and broke up in 2007 before releasing a first full-length album.

Davis is noted for her soaring vocals and minimalist lyrics. In addition to having a unique ethereal vocal style, she can play both keyboards and guitar. She seems to favor Fender Telecasters in concert (seen live while playing with Ambulette), as well as a variety of other guitars. She is noted for playing a vintage Rhodes Piano on both Denali albums, their self-titled album and its follow-up, The Instinct. She has also been seen playing a number of synthesizers, including her Nord Electro, in Ambulette. For live use, this small, lightweight instrument has taken over from the Rhodes, which is notoriously heavy at around 200 pounds.

She has teamed back up with her brother Keeley to form the band Glös.
