= Live at La Zona Rosa 3.19.04 =

Live album by Sparta
- Released: 2004
- Recorded: March 19, 2004
- Genre: Alternative rock, indie rock
- Length: 26:14
- Label: Geffen Records/Mountain Dew
- Producer: Chuck E. Myers Nicholas Terry

Sparta chronology
Porcelain (2004)	Live at La Zona Rosa 3.19.04 (2004)	Threes (2006)

Live at La Zona Rosa 3.19.04 is a live album released by Sparta. The album has since been out of print. Only 1000 copies were made.

There is also a live EP released by the band Coheed and Cambria named Live at La Zona Rosa, recorded on the same date when the two bands played together.

== Track listing ==
All tracks are written by Sparta.

No.	Title	Length
1.	"Intro"	0:22
2.	"Cut Your Ribbon"	3:07
3.	"Mye"	3:51
4.	"La Cerca"	4:44
5.	"Light Burns Clear"	4:26
6.	"Lines in Sand"	5:53
7.	"Assemble the Empire"	3:51

== Personnel ==
Sparta

- Jim Ward – guitar, lead vocals
- Paul Hinojos – guitar, backing vocals
- Matt Miller – bass
- Tony Hajjar – drums

=== Management ===
- Blaze James @ Black Sheep Fellowship

=== A&R ===
- Ron Handler @ DreamWorks/Geffen

=== Booking ===
- Don Muller @ CAA

=== Legal ===
- Ian Montone and Scott Bradford @ Davis, Shapiro. Lewit, Montone and Hayes

=== Road Crew ===
- Gabe Kerbrat: Tour Manager
- Adam Wakeling: Sound
- Jeff "Rhino" Neuman: Stage Tech

=== The Burning Van ===
- Chuck E. Myers: Producer
- Nicholas Terry: Producer
- Brain Vaughn: Engineer
- Tino Saiki: Assistant Engineer
- Matt Winegar: Remote Truck Engineering
