= Matt Miller (musician) =

American bassist

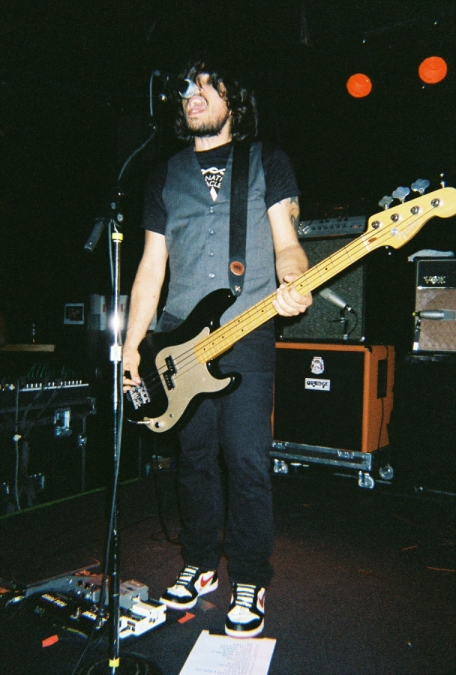
- Matt Miller in 2006

Background information
- Origin: El Paso, Texas, U.S.
- Genres: Post-hardcore; Alternative rock
- Occupation: Bassist
- Instrument: Bass guitar
- Years active: 2002–Present

Matt Miller is a native of El Paso, Texas and the bassist for the Post-hardcore band, Sparta. He currently resides in Los Angeles, California.

== Sparta ==
Matt Miller joined vocalist Jim Ward, drummer Tony Hajjar, and guitarist Paul Hinojos in Sparta a few months after its conception when original bassist Erick Sanger was let go from the group, and Miller's previous band Belknap broke up. The fact that Sparta was starting so soon after the break-up of his bandmates previous effort, At the Drive-In, did not faze Miller, though he knew the band would have a rough start. For the band's first record, Wiretap Scars, all members contributed lyrics, and Miller was no exception. Though Sparta's frontman Ward now takes on lyrical duties by himself; Miller has expanded his role in the group, now providing back-up vocals along with guitarist Keeley Davis (Hinojos has since left the group). Also, some songs on their latest album, Threes, are noticeably more bass orientated. The first single of the album, "Taking Back Control", opens with a bass heavy groove, and is Sparta's most successful single to date, reaching 24 on the U.S. Mainstream Rock charts. Miller refers to Threes as more positive than the previous records, and describes the addition of Davis as a breath of fresh air.

== Discography ==
=== With Belknap ===
- Music is Our Blood, Blood is Our Bond (Compilation - 2002)

Contributed the song "Sounds Like Paris"

=== With Sparta ===
- Austere (2002)
- Wiretap Scars (2002)
- Live at La Zona Rosa 3.19.04 (2004)
- Porcelain (2004)
- Threes (2006)
- Trust the River (2020)
- Sparta (2022)
- Live 2023 (2024)

== Equipment with Sparta ==
Miller uses several different bass guitars and amplifiers while performing with Sparta. While the equipment Miller uses changes over time, this is a list of some of the equipment he has used thus far.

=== Bass guitars ===
- Gretsch Broadkaster
- '69 Fender P-Bass

Miller has two different P-Basses, one black and one off-white

=== Amplifiers ===
- Orange AD200 Bass Head
- Orange 4X10 Cabinet
- Orange 1X15 Cabinet
- '74 Ampeg B-15
- Marshall Head
- SWR Cabinet
