= West Texas (album) =

Studio album by Sleepercar
- Released: April 22, 2008 (US)
- Genre: Alternative country Country rock Acoustic rock
- Length: 40:00
- Label: Civil Defense League

West Texas is the debut album by Jim Ward's latest alternative country project Sleepercar. Although the beginning of Sleepercar dates back to the demise of At the Drive-In, Ward only found the time to focus on the project and make it his full-time commitment after the hiatus of his second band Sparta in 2008, when he started working full-time on the Sleepercar album.

The album's music is influenced by such artists as Gram Parsons, Ryan Adams, Bob Dylan, Tom Petty and Wilco.

== Track listing ==
All songs written by Jim Ward

No.	Title	Length
1.	"A Broken Promise"	2:58
2.	"Wasting My Time"	2:57
3.	"Fences Down"	3:53
4.	"Wednesday Nights"	4:04
5.	"Kings and Compromises"	4:52
6.	"Heavy Weights"	4:42
7.	"Sound the Alarm"	4:19
8.	"End of a Year"	3:36
9.	"You Should Run"	4:20
10.	"All Will End Well"	1:22
11.	"Stumble In"	2:57

Tembloroso re-release
No.	Title	Length
12.	"Heart" (Originally appeared on two different Sleepercar 7" records (Fences Down 7" & A Broken Promise 7")	3:35

== Personnel ==
- Jim Ward – lead vocals, guitar
- Chris Heinrich – pedal steel guitar
- Jeff Ward – bass guitar
- Gabe Gonzalez – piano
- Micah Adams – guitar
- Matthew Schmitz – drums
