= Threes (album) =

Studio album by Sparta
- Released: October 24, 2006
- Recorded: March – June 2006
- Studio: Robert Lang (Shoreline, Washington)
- Genres: Alternative rock, post-hardcore, indie rock
- Length: 49:24
- Labels: Hollywood, Anti-
- Producer: Dave Bassett

Sparta chronology
Live at La Zona Rosa 3.19.04 (2004)	Threes (2006)	Trust the River (2020)

Singles from Threes
- 1. "Taking Back Control" Released: September 25, 2006; 2. "Erase It Again" Released: April 16, 2007

Professional ratings
Review scores
Source	Rating
AllMusic	link
Austin Chronicle	link
Aversion	link
IGN	8/10 link
Kerrang!	3/5 stars
Metal Hammer	5/10 stars
Pitchfork	6.1/10 November 10, 2006
Rocklouder	link
Spin	link
Stylus Magazine	C− October 24, 2006

Threes is the third studio album by American rock band Sparta. It was released on October 24, 2006, and peaked at number 83 on the Billboard 200. It is their first album with new guitarist Keeley Davis, previously of Engine Down and Denali.

The album was made available for streaming several days before its release on the band's MySpace site. A leaked copy of the album surfaced on the internet as well during early October 2006. Initial reviews were mixed, ranging from average to excellent (see reviews section). The album is generally considered to be darker and more complex than previous offerings, differing greatly from previous material in some places with callbacks in others.

Jim Ward explains the meaning of Threes. "Threes is a reference to the number 3 being important in my life. A lot of intersections happen involving that number, this record was a big changing point for me. The artwork is left to be interpreted by the viewer, you get a lot of interesting ideas form [sic] folks, I like it."

On April 9, 2008, an official blog was posted on Sparta's Myspace page announcing the release of Threes on double vinyl after being in development for some time. It is limited to 1,000 copies with 3 different colors, and features the tracklisting in a different order, including the bonus tracks split up amongst various versions of the CD release. 200 copies on peach vinyl with black splatter, 300 copies on white vinyl, 500 copies on black vinyl with peach splatter. Orders can be placed through Vinyl Collective, the company distributing the double LP, and are expected to ship April 19, 2008.

== Promotion ==
Prior to the release, the band released a variety of statements, videos and other information for fans.

=== Podcasts ===
Podcasts by the band, released at irregular intervals and featuring a variety of homemade footage of them in studio and at other locations were made available to fans. They can be seen on their website, but were usually released on their MySpace page.

=== Personal message ===
The band released a message to fans prior to the release of the album, thanking them for their support and kind words. It is currently available for viewing on the Sparta MySpace.

=== Music videos ===
The music video for the single "Taking Back Control" was released on Yahoo Music in mid-October 2006. It can still be viewed for free on this website. The music video for the second single, "Erase It Again", can be viewed through the band's website.

=== Website redesign ===
An entirely redesigned website was launched just prior to the release of Threes. The site starts with a splash screen incorporating elements from the Eme Nakia film, Threes, and the individual band members. Sections included on the site include News, Tour, Media, Store, Contact and links to the fan run community Without a Sound as well as a signup page for the Sparta mailing list.

=== Album versions ===
According to their official website, several different versions of the album were made available, depending on where they were purchased. Albums bought from Best Buy include a DVD with the short film Eme Nakia. Many independent record stores gave away limited edition Lithograph posters with painted portraits of Jim, Matt, Tony and Keely.

FYE albums included a bonus CD with an unreleased Sparta track titled "As Far As We Go" with each purchase. Purchasing the entire album on iTunes also includes a bonus track titled "Blood Spills".

== Track listing ==
1. "Untreatable Disease" – 3:19
2. "Crawl" – 3:54
3. "Unstitch Your Mouth" – 3:07
4. "Taking Back Control" – 3:41
5. "Erase It Again" – 3:37
6. "Atlas" – 4:30
7. "The Most Vicious Crime" – 6:20
8. "False Start" – 3:51
9. "Weather the Storm" – 4:43
10. "Red.Right.Return. (Straight in Our Hands)" – 4:30
11. "Without a Sound" – 3:18
12. "Translations" – 4:33

Bonus tracks

- "Blood Spills" (iTunes/Japan bonus track) – 3:44
- "As Far as We Go" (FYE/Japan bonus track) – 3:37
- "Born and Buried" (European bonus track) – 3:03

=== Double vinyl edition ===
Side A:

1. "The Most Vicious Crime"
2. "Born and Buried"
3. "Crawl"
4. "Red.Right.Return. (Straight In Our Hands)"

Side B:

1. "Weather the Storm"
2. "Without a Sound"
3. "Erase It Again"
4. "False Start"

Side C:

1. "Untreatable Disease"
2. "Taking Back Control"
3. "Blood Spills"
4. "As Far As We Go"

Side D:

1. "Unstitch Your Mouth"
2. "Translations"
3. "Atlas"
- Although not stated as an actual track, in the details about who sings background vocals, the song "We've Already Lost" is stated, without any prior mention of this song on either the Vinyl/LP or CD version.

== Personnel ==
=== Musicians ===
- Sparta – primary artist
- Merry Clayton – background vocals on "Atlas" and "Translations"
- Chris Henrich – pedal steel guitar
- Keeley Davis – guitar, vocals
- Tony Hajjar – drums
- Matt Miller – bass, backup vocals
- Jim Ward – guitar, vocals

=== Technical personnel ===
- Liz Smith – guitar technician
- Joe Chiccarelli – engineer
- Mike Major – mixing
- Alan Yoshida – mastering
- Dave Bassett – producer, engineer
- Gregg Keplinger – drum technician
- Ray Wallace – paintings
- Jared Kvitka – assistant engineer
- George Gumbs – engineer
- Erik Ron – digital editing
- Geert Teuwen – cover photo

== Charts ==
Chart performance for Threes
Chart (2006)	Peak position
Australian Albums (ARIA)	96
US Billboard 200	83
