= Porcelain (Sparta album) =

Studio album by Sparta
- Released: July 13, 2004
- Recorded: October – December 2003 at Sunset Sound Studios in Los Angeles; December 2003 – January 2004 at Rosewood Studios in El Paso
- Genre: Alternative rock, indie rock, post-hardcore
- Length: 57:28
- Label: Geffen
- Producer: Mike Major

Sparta chronology
Wiretap Scars (2002)	Porcelain (2004)	Live at La Zona Rosa 3/19/2004 (2004)

Porcelain is the second studio album by American rock band Sparta. It was released on July 13, 2004 by Geffen Records and peaked at number 60 on the Billboard 200. The first single released from the album was "Breaking the Broken."

== Critical reception ==
Professional ratings
Aggregate scores
Source	Rating
Metacritic	62/100
Review scores
Source	Rating
AllMusic	4/5 stars
The Austin Chronicle	2/5 stars
Pitchfork	7.6/10
Punknews.org	4.5/5 stars
Rolling Stone	2/5 stars
Sputnikmusic	4.0/5.0
Tiny Mix Tapes	2.5/5 stars

Porcelain garnered a positive reception from music critics. At Metacritic, which assigns a normalized rating out of 100 to reviews from mainstream critics, the album received an average score of 62, based on 19 reviews.

Johnny Loftus of AllMusic praised the album for maintaining Sparta's "caustic intellectualism" without compromising their musical integrity through "label-side meddling" or adhering to "a cliquey music-fan nation", highlighting "From Now to Never" for crystalizing the band's musicianship: "At nearly nine minutes, it renders each facet of Porcelain in perfect miniature, and emphasizes Sparta's stance as a group working faithfully within the system, but also staunchly and refreshingly outside of it." Pitchfork contributor Brian Howe noted how the band's sound became "grandiose and questing, with scintillating, spacious atmospheres" throughout the record, praising the "complex and inventive" arrangements found on "While Oceana Sleeps" and "Lines in Sand", concluding that: "Porcelain is food for sheer bodily exaltation. It's an imperative and ornate exhortation to lay open your nerves and unabashedly, unapologetically feel." Rolling Stone contributor Jenny Eliscu commended the band's "tight and powerful" musicianship on "While Oceana Sleeps" and "Hiss the Villain" but felt it was "rote emo-core, all predictable quiet-loud shifts and overwrought vocal melodies" that didn't elevate them above At the Drive-In, concluding: "Mostly, though, it's just kind of boring." Darcie Stevens of The Austin Chronicle criticized the album for lacking the "ragged edges and complicated time changes" from Sparta's predecessor and instead contained lackluster artistry and "Dashboard Confessional lyrics." A writer for Spin was critical of the band not evolving their Wiretap Scars sound to just "lazily tread" through a modern rock manual that elicits "sticker-on-the-case singles ("Breaking the Broken")" and ventures into "power-ballad turf ("Lines in Sand", "From Now to Never")".

== Track listing ==
All tracks are written by Sparta.

No.	Title	Length
1.	"Guns of Memorial Park"	3:49
2.	"Hiss the Villain"	3:27
3.	"While Oceana Sleeps"	4:24
4.	"La Cerca"	3:43
5.	"Breaking the Broken"	3:47
6.	"Lines in Sand"	6:02
7.	"End Moraine"	4:26
8.	"Death in the Family"	3:37
9.	"Syncope"	1:19
10.	"Tensioning"	5:59
11.	"Travel by Bloodline"	3:06
12.	"P.O.M.E." (drum solo by Tony Hajjar)	0:47
13.	"From Now to Never"	8:39
14.	"Splinters"	4:23

- According to Jim Ward, "P.O.M.E" stands for 'Paris Of the Middle East', referring to Beirut, which is Hajjar's birthplace.

=== Bonus tracks ===
- "Farewell Ruins" (Japan/UK/iTunes bonus track) – 3:17
- "Bombs & Us" (Japan bonus track) – 3:33

== Personnel ==
Credits adapted from the Porcelain liner notes.

Sparta

- Jim Ward – guitar, vocals
- Paul Hinojos – guitar
- Matt Miller – bass
- Tony Hajjar – drums

Additional musicians

- Charlie Bisharat – violin
- Mario de Leon – violin
- Joel Derouin – violin
- Sara Parkins – violin
- Matt Funes – viola
- Dan Smith – cello
- Larry Corbett – cello
- Suzie Takayama – orchestration, string conductor
- Jessika Macias – French speaker on "From Now to Never"

Artwork

- Bill Scoville – graphic design, layout
- Jermaine Rogers – original swan illustration

Production

- Mike Major – producer
- Justin Leeah – ProTools engineer
- Ryan Castle – assistant engineer
- Andy Wallace – mixing (Soundtrack Studios)
- Steve Sisco – assistant mixing
- Mike Zinczenco – assistant mixing
- Tony Schloss – ProTools engineer
- Alan Yoshida – mastering (Ocean Way Mastering)
- Pat Sullivan – editing (Bernie Grundman Mastering)

== Charts ==
Chart performance for Porcelain
Chart (2004)	Peak position
Australian Albums (ARIA)	56
US Billboard 200	60
