= Keeley Davis =

American singer-songwriter (born 1976)

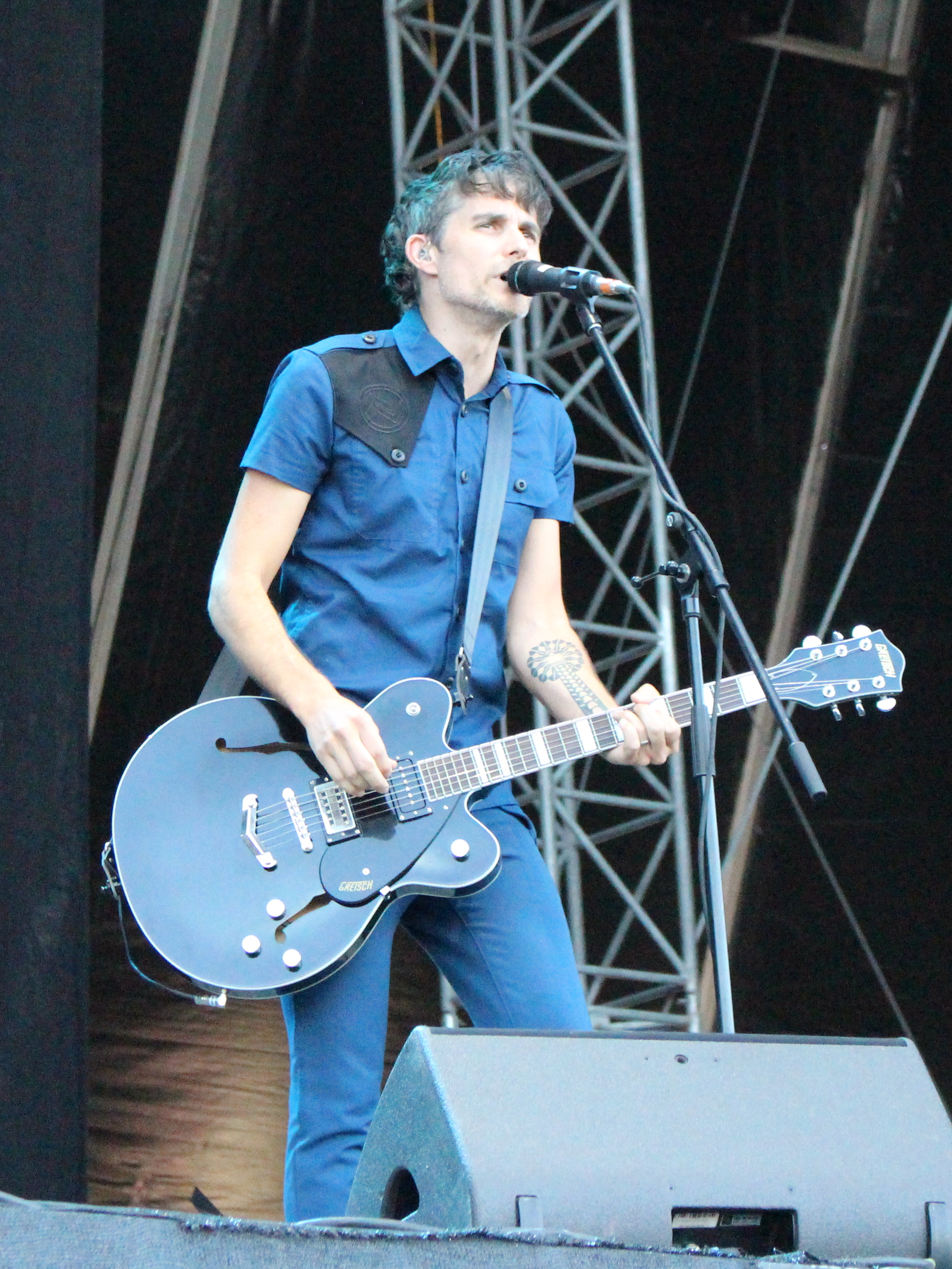
- Davis performing with At the Drive-In in 2017

Background information
- Born: January 4, 1976 (age 50)
- Origin: Richmond, Virginia, US
- Genres: Alternative rock; indie rock; post-hardcore; emo; math rock; electronic; ambient
- Occupations: Musician; singer-songwriter; graphic designer
- Instruments: Guitar; vocals; bass guitar; piano; organ; synthesizer; sampler; programming
- Years active: 1996–present
- Labels: Lookout; Lovitt; Jade Tree
- Member of: Glös
- Formerly of: Engine Down; Sparta; Denali; At the Drive-In

Keeley Davis (born January 4, 1976) is an American guitarist, singer, songwriter and graphic designer. He is best known as a member of the post-hardcore band At the Drive-In, with whom he has recorded one studio album, In•ter a•li•a (2017). Davis is also a former member of the rock bands Sparta and Engine Down.

== Career ==
He was the primary lead singer of the band Engine Down, in which he also played guitar. He was also in the band Denali with his sister, Maura Davis. He played bass and synthesizer.

Engine Down disbanded (under friendly circumstances) after a farewell tour in 2005, and Davis joined Sparta as lead guitarist. Davis has since recollaborated with Maura in the ambient indie rock side-project Glös, formed by him and former Engine Down drummer Cornbread Compton. Their debut album, Harmonium, was released in April 2007 on Lovitt Records. As of 2009, he is working with new band, Heks Orkest, which features longtime collaborators, Jonathon Fuller and Cam DiNinzio. Starting in 2016, Davis was a member of At the Drive-In, following the sudden departure of guitarist and founding member Jim Ward.

=== With Bughummer ===
- Getaway With (1998)

Drummer Brian Lackey Guitar Jon Proctor

=== With Engine Down ===
- Under the Pretense of Present Tense (1999)
- To Bury Within the Sound (2000)
- Demure (2002)
- Engine Down (2004)

=== With Denali ===
- Denali (2002)
- The Instinct (2003)

=== With Sparta ===
- Threes (2006)

=== With Glös ===
- Harmonium (2007)

=== With Heks Orkest ===
- (2 songs free) (2009)

=== With at the Drive-In ===
- in•ter a•li•a (2017)
- Diamanté (2017)

== Equipment with Sparta ==
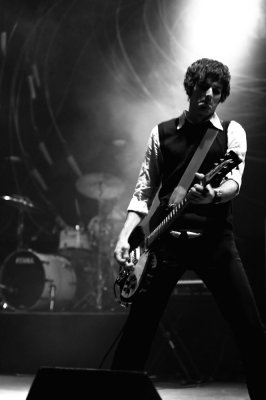
Keeley Davis playing lead guitar during Sparta's 2006 tour.

Unlike bandmate Jim Ward, Davis keeps relatively the same guitar and amp setup on each tour. All of Davis' pedals, two guitars and one amplifier were stolen when their storage facility in Los Angeles was broken into, so the equipment he performs with as of May 2007 is mostly new.

=== Guitars ===
- Rickenbacker 330
- Gibson Les Paul Special Double Cut
- Epiphone 50th Anniversary 1961 SG Special

=== Amplifiers ===
- Orange 100 Watt Rockerverb Amp
- Orange 4x12 Cab

=== Effects ===
- Line 6 DM-4
- Line 6 DL-4
- Line 6 MM-4
- Digitech Whammy

== Equipment with at the Drive-In ==
- Gretsch G2622T TG Streamliner
