= In the Valley, On the Shores =

In The Valley, On The Shores

EP by Jim Ward
- Released: May 1, 2009 (US)
- Recorded: 2008 through 2009, Clap of Thunder & The Chop Shop, El Paso, TX
- Genre: Alternative country, acoustic rock
- Length: 16:32
- Label: Civil Defense League
- Producer: Jim Ward

Jim Ward chronology
Quiet (EP) (2007)	In The Valley, On The Shores (2009)	The End Begins (EP) (2011)

In The Valley, On The Shores is a solo EP released by Jim Ward. It is the second time he released a solo EP, and is the second out of the three EP's in his acoustic EP trilogy. It was released May 1, 2009 by Ward's Civil Defense League record label. The EP also features Tegan Quin, from the band Tegan and Sara, who sings harmony on the second track "Broken Songs". Only 500 copies of the physical CD were made. The CD's were all hand numbered.

== Track listing ==
All songs written by Jim Ward except "The Newest One" which was written with Gabe Gonzalez

No.	Title	Length
1.	"All That We Lost"	3:00
2.	"Broken Songs"	3:16
3.	"My Town"	3:27
4.	"The Newest One"	2:42
5.	"This Love Has Gone Away"	1:08

== Personnel ==
- Jim Ward - Guitar, vocals
- Greg Sosa - Bass
- Tegan Quin - Sang on "Broken Songs"
- Armando Alvarez - Design & Layout of CD
