= The End Begins (EP) =

EP by Jim Ward
- Released: February 14, 2011 (US)
- Recorded: last few months of 2010, Clap of Thunder, El Paso, TX
- Genre: Alternative country, acoustic rock
- Length: 18:23
- Label: Civil Defense League

Jim Ward chronology
In The Valley, On The Shores (EP) (2009)	The End Begins (2011)	Quiet In The Valley, On The Shores The End Begins (2011)

The End Begins is a solo EP released by Jim Ward. It is the third and final episode of his acoustic EP trilogy. It was released February 14, 2011 via Tembloroso.com through digital download. This is the only EP from Ward's acoustic trilogy that was released through digital download only.

The song "Lake Travis" is entirely an instrumental track, with no lyrics. "Waves In Spanish" is a narrative. "Decades" is a love song that Ward wrote for his wife. "The Beginning Of The End" was written as a thank-you song to all fans and listeners.

== Track listing ==
All tracks are written by Jim Ward.

No.	Title	Length
1.	"Lake Travis"	3:46
2.	"Waves in Spanish"	7:08
3.	"Decades"	3:49
4.	"The Beginning of the End"	3:40

== Personnel ==
- Jim Ward - Guitar, vocals
- Gabe González - Guitar, Mixing and Mastering
- Nicole Smith - Piano, Back up vocals on "Decades"
- Joel Quintana - Drums and Percussion
- Chad Morris - Trumpet
- Armando Alvarez - Design
