= Quiet (EP) =

EP by Jim Ward
- Released: November 6, 2007 (US)
- Recorded: July 2007, Clap of Thunder, El Paso, TX
- Genre: Alternative country, acoustic rock
- Length: 16:18
- Label: Civil Defense League

Jim Ward chronology
| Quiet (2007) | In The Valley, On The Shores (EP) (2009) |

Quiet is a solo EP released by Jim Ward. It is the first time Ward has released an album of solo material, although he has previously released two solo songs on compilation discs. It was released November 6, 2007 by Ward's own Civil Defense League record label. The album was marketed and distributed by Doghouse Records.

Professional ratings
Review scores
| Source | Rating |
|---|---|
| Punknews.org | 3/5 stars |
| Punk76.com | 3/5 stars |

== Track listing ==
All tracks are written by Jim Ward.

| No. | Title | Length |
|---|---|---|
| 1. | "On My Way Back Home Again" | 3:26 |
| 2. | "Take It Back" | 3:14 |
| 3. | "Mystery Talks" | 2:49 |
| 4. | "Coastlines" | 3:17 |
| 5. | "Easier Said Than Done" | 3:46 |

== Personnel ==
- Jim Ward - Guitar, vocals
- Ray Wallace - Harmonica and Back-up vocals on "On My Way Back Home"
- Maura Davis - Harmony on "Take It Back"
- Christ Heinrich - Ukulele on "Coastlines"
