= Denali (band) =

American indie rock band

- Origin: Richmond, Virginia, USA
- Genre: Indie rock
- Years active: 2000–2004, 2008–2009
- Label: Jade Tree Records
- Spinoffs: Ambulette; Engine Down; Glös
- Past members: Cam DiNunzio; Jonathan Fuller; Keeley Davis; Maura Davis; Stephen Howard; Ryan Rapsys

Denali was an American indie rock band formed in April 2000 in Richmond, Virginia. The group disbanded in 2004 but reunited in 2008 for several performances.

== History ==
The band was founded by Cam DiNunzio, Jonathan Fuller, Keeley Davis and Maura Davis. They recorded a five-song demo in January 2001, and signed with Jade Tree Records later that year.

Denali released their self-titled debut album in 2002. Denali went on to tour with Deftones at that band's request.

In August 2003, they released their second album The Instinct. Jonathan Fuller and Keeley Davis left the band to pursue Engine Down full time. Davis was replaced by Stephen Howard and Ryan Rapsys replaced Fuller. However, the new band configuration ultimately led to Denali breaking up in April 2004. In 2006, Lovitt Records released the DVD Pinnacle, featuring a concert from 2003.

In November 2004, Maura Davis, Ryan Rapsys, Stephen Howard and new member Matt Clark formed the band Bella Lea. They later changed their name to Ambulette. Maura & Keeley reunited as band members in Glös. They released their debut album through Lovitt Records in 2007. During this period, Fuller and DiNunzio worked for Black Iris, a Richmond-based company that produces original music for advertisements, television, and film.

Denali performed a reunion show on July 5, 2008 at The National Theater in Richmond. This was followed by two further shows in New York and Los Angeles in September. In June 2009, two additional shows were performed in Philadelphia and Washington, D.C. A new song was played at these shows, listed online under the name "Church Hill Bricks."

== Discography ==
=== Studio albums ===
- Denali (2002)
- The Instinct (2003)

=== Demos ===
- Demonstration (2001)

=== Other appearances ===
- Rock Against Bush, Vol. 1 (2004)
  - "Normal Days" from The Instinct (Track 20)

== Videography ==
- Pinnacle (Concert DVD) (2006)
