= Wiretap Scars =

Studio album by Sparta
- Released: August 13, 2002
- Recorded: January – March 2002
- Studio: Armoury (Vancouver); House of Blues (Encino); Cherokee (Hollywood)
- Genre: Alternative rock, post-hardcore
- Length: 45:38 (International edition); 49:33 (UK edition)
- Label: DreamWorks
- Producer: Jerry Finn

Sparta chronology
Austere (2002)	Wiretap Scars (2002)	Porcelain (2004)

Singles from Wiretap Scars
- 1. "Cut Your Ribbon" Released: 2002; 2. "Air" Released: 2003

Wiretap Scars is the debut studio album by American rock band Sparta. It was released on August 13, 2002 by DreamWorks Records and peaked at number 71 on the Billboard 200. Only months separated this release from their debut EP, Austere. The album is greatly influenced by the music of At the Drive-In, with whom most of Sparta's members played before their split in 2001.

The vocals and track naming in particular reflect At the Drive-In's Relationship of Command, the last album by the group. This is in contrast to the music of the Mars Volta, formed by two other members of At the Drive-In (Omar and Cedric), which departs entirely from the post-hardcore genre.

== Writing ==
Frontman Jim Ward and guitarist Paul Hinojos both cited Fugazi and Jawbreaker as personal influences during the writing of the album. Ward cited Billy Joel as an influence on his songwriting and melodies. Ward has also noted that Radiohead's Kid A inspired him to avoid traditional song structures, stating:

Fuck the verse-chorus-verse-chorus-bridge-chorus. I fall into it, we all fall into it, but: We have songs where there is no strategy to the song, it's a fucking mindfuck. But it's got the hooks into it. It makes you want to listen to it. That's what I thought is great about Kid A, is that it... There's songs where there is one guitar part that does the entire song, but the rest of the song is changing it.

Some of the guitar parts that appear on the album, such as the main riff for "Air", were written while At the Drive-In was still together, and had been slated for their followup to Relationship of Command.

According to Ward, "Collapse" deals with "one of the lowest and scariest moments of my life," which occurred while he was in Australia with At the Drive-In.

== Recording ==
Whereas most rock producers typically record drums followed by bass, followed by the guitars, producer Jerry Finn had Ward and Hinojos record guitars after drums had been recorded and before the bass, which influenced how Ward has recorded all his albums since then. Jim Ward has stated that approximately 90% of his guitar parts on the album were played on Finn's personal Gibson Les Paul Junior.

According to drummer Tony Hajjar, despite being on what was essentially a major label, the band had total creative freedom in the studio.

== Critical reception ==
Professional ratings
Aggregate scores
Source	Rating
Metacritic	69/100
Review scores
Source	Rating
AllMusic	4.5/5 stars
Drowned in Sound	9/10
Pitchfork	7.2/10
Punknews.org	4.5/5 stars
Rolling Stone	3/5 stars
Sputnikmusic	4.0/5

Wiretap Scars garnered positive reviews from music critics. At Metacritic, which assigns a normalized rating out of 100 to reviews from mainstream critics, the album received an average rating of 69, based on 14 reviews.

Drowned in Sound's Andy Frankowski commended the band for retaining the Drive-In sound while offering a more controlled melodic approach to it, concluding that "[T]hey show a different sign of maturing; it's a kind of growing older without really aging. They have the same talent they had before but it's the way they deliver it that will have eyes being opened and ears to the ground." Jason Jackowiak of Splendid commented about the record, "With Wiretap Scars, Sparta have not only made great strides in the progression of their art form; they've also acknowledged the artists who inspired them. That said, the question remains: will Sparta gain recognition on the basis of their own merits, or are they forever to be judged against the accomplishments of their previous employers? Only time will tell." Sputnikmusic emeritus Damrod praised the band's musicality for its use of instruments and electronic beats to craft quiet yet rough tracks that flow well throughout the record, concluding that "This is a great album by a great band. Definitely one of the better Indie/Post-Hardcore bands out there. The production is good, the overall feel of the album as well. If you liked ATD-I, I guess you will have kind of easy access to this one, though it is much more mellow than most stuff by ATD-I." Noel Murray of The A.V. Club said that, "Dialing down At The Drive-In's ferociousness and concentrating more on its exploration of dynamic, textured volume, Sparta has made a smartly produced, superficially exciting record full of deafening electric hum, full-throated shouts, and quiet, intricately picked guitar breaks." Honolulu Star-Bulletin's Gary Chun praised the album, saying that "bracing, punk-fueled rock music hasn't sounded this smart and focused since Fugazi's heyday."

Alternative Press ranked "Cut Your Ribbon" at number 61 on their list of the best 100 singles from the 2000s.

== Tour ==
On April 12, 2023, the band announced a 40-city U.S. tour celebrating the 20th anniversary of their debut record, beginning on May 4 at the Nile Half House in Mesa, Arizona and finishing on August 12 in Dallas' Southside Music Hall. '68, Thursday's Geoff Rickly and zeta were supporting acts on the tour.

== Track listing ==
All tracks are written by Sparta.

No.	Title	Length
1.	"Cut Your Ribbon"	3:04
2.	"Air"	3:57
3.	"Mye"	3:39
4.	"Collapse"	4:16
5.	"Sans Cosm"	3:59
6.	"Light Burns Clear"	4:24
7.	"Cataract"	5:11
8.	"Red Alibi"	3:42
9.	"℞ Coup"	3:14
10.	"Glasshouse Tarot"	5:13
11.	"Echodyne Harmonic"	3:57
12.	"Assemble the Empire"	3:02

Japanese bonus tracks
No.	Title	Length
13.	"Vacant Skies"	3:55
14.	"Echodyne Harmonic (de-mix)"

UK bonus track
No.	Title	Length
13.	"Vacant Skies"	3:55

== Personnel ==
Credits adapted from the liner notes of Wiretap Scars.

Sparta

- Jim Ward – guitar, vocals
- Paul Hinojos – guitar
- Matt Miller – bass
- Tony Hajjar – drums

Additional musician

- Finn Mannich – cello

Artwork

- Jason Noto
- Doug Cunningham

Production

- Jerry Finn – producer, mixing
- Joe McGrath – engineer
- Alex Aligizakis – 2nd engineer
- Mike Fasano – drum tech
- Jeff Moses – mix assistant

== Charts ==
Chart performance for Wiretap Scars
Chart (2002)	Peak position
Australia (ARIA Hitseekers)	5
US Billboard 200	71
