= Glös =

Glös is the side-project of indie-rock musicians and siblings Keeley Davis and Maura Davis, along with friend Cornbread Compton. The group released its debut album on Lovitt Records in 2007.

== Lineup ==
Keeley Davis: Guitar, Programming, Bass, Lead Vocals.

Cornbread Compton: Drums, Programming.

Maura Davis: Vocals.

== Discography ==
- Harmonium (2007) Lovitt Records
- Hidden Cities EP (2007)
