= Austere (EP) =

EP by Sparta
- Released: March 26, 2002
- Recorded: 2002
- Genre: Alternative rock, post-hardcore, indie rock, emo
- Length: 16:05
- Label: DreamWorks
- Producer: Sparta

Sparta chronology
Austere (2002)	Wiretap Scars (2002)

Professional ratings
Review scores
Source	Rating
AllMusic	3/5 stars
Stylus Magazine	C+

Austere is an EP by Sparta, released in 2002 on DreamWorks Records. Their first record, it was released one year after the break-up of At the Drive-In.

All of the songs were re-recorded for Sparta's debut album Wiretap Scars, however "Vacant Skies" appeared on the UK version of the album as a bonus track. It also appeared on the compilation album Dragging the Lake II, released by Atticus clothing company. It was recorded at Rosewood Studios in El Paso, Texas by Mike Major.

== Track listing ==
1. "Mye" – 3:33
2. "Cataract" – 5:09
3. "Vacant Skies" – 3:32
4. "Echodyne Harmonic (de-mix)" – 3:50

== Personnel ==
- Dave Shirk – mastering
- Sparta – engineer, main performer
- Mike Major – producer, engineer, mixing
- Gabriel el Chino Gonzalez – assistant

== Charts ==
Chart performance for Austere
Chart (2002)	Peak position
Australia (ARIA)	80
