= Denali (album) =

Studio album by Denali
- Released: April 16, 2002
- Recorded: Sound of Music, Richmond, VA, December 2001
- Genre: Indie
- Length: 44:33
- Label: Jade Tree
- Producer: Alan Weatherhead, Mark Linkous

Denali chronology
Denali (2002)	The Instinct (2003)

Professional ratings
Review scores
Source	Rating
Allmusic	4/5 stars
Pitchfork Media	(5.8/10) link

Denali is the debut album of the American rock band Denali.

== Track listing ==
1. "French Mistake"
2. "You File"
3. "Lose Me"
4. "Everybody Knows"
5. "Prozac"
6. "Relief"
7. "Time Away"
8. "Gunner"
9. "Function"
10. "Where I Landed"

== Personnel ==
Maura Davis: vocals, piano, rhodes piano, guitar
Keeley Davis: bass, guitar, synth, vocals, samples, organ
Cam DiNunzio: guitars, synth, samples, MIDI orchestra, organ
Johnathan Fuller: drums, sequencer, samples (tracks 1–6, 8, 10)
Mark Linkous: MIDI orchestra, synth, samples, bass drum (tracks 6–7)
