= The Instinct (album) =

Studio album by Denali
- Released: October 28, 2003
- Recorded: Tarquin Studios, Bridgeport, CT, June 2003
- Genre: Indie
- Length: 38:46
- Label: Jade Tree
- Producer: Peter Katis and Denali

Denali chronology
Denali (2002)	The Instinct (2003)

Professional ratings
Review scores
Source	Rating
Allmusic	4/5 stars
Pitchfork Media	(7.2/10) link

The Instinct is the second studio album by Denali, released in 2003. It is their final album, as the band broke up the following year.

== Track listing ==
1. "Hold Your Breath"
2. "Surface"
3. "Run Through"
4. "The Instinct"
5. "Do Something"
6. "Real Heat"
7. "Nullaby"
8. "Normal Days"
9. "Welcome"

== Personnel ==
- Maura Davis: vocals, guitars, keyboards, piano, vibraphone
- Keeley Davis: bass, baritone, synth, samples
- Cam DiNunzio: guitars, piano, melodica, programmed synth, noises
- Johnathan Fuller: drums, percussion, sequencer, samples
