= Madden NFL 07 =

2006 American football video game

- North American cover art featuring Shaun Alexander
- Developers: EA Tiburon; EA Canada (Wii); HB Studios (Wii); Exient Entertainment (DS/GBA)
- Publisher: EA Sports
- Series: Madden NFL
- Platforms: PlayStation 2 PlayStation 3 PlayStation Portable; Xbox; Xbox 360; Microsoft Windows; Nintendo DS; Game Boy Advance; Wii; GameCube; Mobile phone
- Release: August 22, 2006: NA: August 22, 2006; EU: August 25, 2006 (DS, PC, PS2, Xbox); AU: August 31, 2006 (Xbox); EU: September 8, 2006 (X360); AU: September 14, 2006 (PC, PS2, X360); AU: October 26, 2006 (PSP); JP: December 7, 2006 (PS2); JP: December 21, 2006 (X360) PlayStation 3 & Wii; NA: November 19, 2006; AU: December 7, 2006 (Wii); EU: December 8, 2006 (Wii); JP: April 26, 2007 (PS3); EU: July 30, 2007 (PS3)
- Genre: Sports
- Modes: Single-player, Multiplayer

Madden NFL 07 is an American football video game based on the NFL that was published by EA Sports and developed by EA Tiburon. It is the first in the video game series to debut for the PlayStation 3 and Wii consoles as launch titles and the last Madden game to be released on the Game Boy Advance. Former Seattle Seahawks running back Shaun Alexander is on the cover.

== Features ==
Just as in the previous titles in the Madden NFL series, Madden NFL 07 makes a few additions to the general game play.

- Lead Blocker Control: After selecting a running play, the player will be able to cycle through the offensive players as they get into position at the line. The player can choose the athlete to control when the ball is snapped, and the game camera will zoom in on the fullback, tackle, guard, center, tight end, or wide receiver selected. With this feature, it is now possible for the player to open up a path for a running play, as the computer controls the halfback and tries to slip through the gap created. This feature also appeals to Madden players who do not wish to use computer assistance in any way, shape, or form. This feature allows the player to manually block with their fullback, tackle, guard, center, tight end, or wide receiver and quickly switch to their halfback to manually slip through the gap created, thus eliminating any computer assistance during the gameplay.
- Highlight Stick: Players can now move the right analog stick in any direction to see an animation where the smaller running backs will duck, spin, or squirt out of a tackle. It is also possible to string such evasive moves together, piecing together a juke left with a hop step backwards (down on the right analog stick for PS2 and Xbox or down on the C stick for GameCube) to elude defenders. The Truck Stick animations still exist for the bigger backs, but also feature more variety of running moves with the addition of the Highlight Stick. For example, using the Highlight Stick with Tiki Barber, a smaller back not known for trucking, utilizes an array of moves to avoid and squirt out of tackles.
- Juking and Spinning: Players can now choose two types of both Jukes and Spins to avoid would-be tacklers. For the PS2, players can either do a cut move to the left or right using the L1 or R1 buttons respectively, or a wider juke to the left or right by flicking the Right Analog stick left or right respectively. For a quick spin to elude a tackler the player simply taps the circle button. For a stronger spin which could possibly break a tackle, simply hold down the circle button.
- FreeMotion Controls: The Wii version of Madden NFL 07, which was developed at EA Canada rather than Tiburon, features a unique control scheme that has been completely redone to complement the motion sensing capabilities of the console's Wii Remote and Nunchuk controllers.

== Xbox 360, PlayStation 2, PlayStation 3, and Wii versions ==
The seventh generation version of Madden NFL 07 featured the Superstar Mode and Franchise but the Tony Bruno Show was absent in this game possibly due to a contractual issue, but he was in the Wii, GameCube, Xbox, and PlayStation 2 versions. The Xbox 360 and PlayStation 3 versions also did not allow the player to edit the players appearance or attributes or change the numbers on their jerseys, but the Wii version and PlayStation 2 version did. Though, the Xbox 360 version did allow one to create a player. The franchise mode is not as deep as the previous generation versions, as Owner Mode is not present. Fantasy Draft and Two-Player co-operative play are missing as well. Also this game would be the last appearance of the NFL Europe teams in the Xbox version, next gen games came without the league teams.

== Reception ==
=== Critical reception ===
Reception

Aggregate scores
Aggregator	Score									
Aggregator	DS	GBA	GameCube	PC	PS2	PS3	PSP	Wii	Xbox	Xbox 360
GameRankings	70%	63%	82%	80%	84%	76%	80%	80%	82%	81%
Metacritic	70/100	68/100	82/100	80/100	84/100	76/100	78/100	81/100	83/100	80/100

Review scores
Publication	Score									
Publication	DS	GBA	GameCube	PC	PS2	PS3	PSP	Wii	Xbox	Xbox 360
Electronic Gaming Monthly	N/A	N/A	N/A	N/A	N/A	N/A	N/A	5.67/10	N/A	7.67/10
Eurogamer	N/A	N/A	N/A	N/A	N/A	N/A	N/A	N/A	N/A	7/10
Game Informer	N/A	N/A	8.25/10	N/A	8.25/10	7.75/10	N/A	7.75/10	8.25/10	7.75/10
GamePro	N/A	N/A	N/A	N/A	4.5/5	4.5/5	N/A	4.25/5	4.5/5	5/5
GameRevolution	N/A	N/A	B	N/A	B	B−	N/A	N/A	B	B−
GameSpot	7.7/10	6.5/10	8.1/10	7.8/10	8.1/10	7.9/10	7.6/10	8.4/10	8.1/10	7.9/10
GameSpy	N/A	N/A	N/A	4/5	4/5	4/5	4/5	4.5/5	4/5	4/5
GameTrailers	N/A	N/A	N/A	N/A	N/A	N/A	N/A	8.7/10	N/A	8.7/10
GameZone	7.2/10	N/A	7.9/10	8/10	9/10	8.2/10	8.5/10	8.7/10	8.6/10	8.8/10
IGN	6/10	7.5/10	8.3/10	8.3/10	8.3/10	8.3/10	8/10	8.5/10	8.3/10	8.5/10
Nintendo Power	7.5/10	7/10	9/10	N/A	N/A	N/A	N/A	8.5/10	N/A	N/A
Official U.S. PlayStation Magazine	N/A	N/A	N/A	N/A	9/10	6.5/10	8/10	N/A	N/A	N/A
Official Xbox Magazine (US)	N/A	N/A	N/A	N/A	N/A	N/A	N/A	N/A	7/10	8/10
PC Gamer (US)	N/A	N/A	N/A	85%	N/A	N/A	N/A	N/A	N/A	N/A
The A.V. Club	N/A	N/A	N/A	N/A	A−	N/A	N/A	N/A	A−	B−
Detroit Free Press	N/A	N/A	N/A	N/A	N/A	N/A	N/A	N/A	N/A	3/4

The game received "generally favorable reviews" on all platforms except the DS and Game Boy Advance versions, which received "average" reviews according to video game review aggregator website Metacritic.

AllGame gave the PS2 and Xbox versions each a score of four stars out of five and said of the entertainment, "The Madden gameplay has always been spectacular and it gets better with the new offensive line and running back controls." IGN gave the 2D edition of the Mobile phone version a score of 4.5 out of ten and called it "a mess" and "a let-down and a bad call for all involved." However, the same website gave the 3D edition of the same version a score of eight out of ten and called it "a far superior product over the 2D edition -- it's the only download you should consider if you want at some mobile Madden." In Japan, Famitsu gave the PlayStation 2 version a score of one six, one eight, one six, and one seven, for a total of 27 out of 40, while also giving the Xbox 360 version a score of one seven, one eight, one seven, and one five, for the same total of 27 out of 40.

=== Awards ===
- The Wii version of Madden NFL 07 won GameSpot's award for Best Traditional Sports Game and for Best New Control Scheme of 2006. The reason cited for this selection, particularly in light of other versions that feature more detailed graphics and online play capability, is the Wii version's FreeMotion controls, which provided a fresh take on play mechanics that the editorial staff felt had grown stale after years of minimal year-to-year adjustments.
- It received GameSpot's Award for Best Original Game Mechanic for the FreeMotion controls used in the Wii version.
- It was named the "Best Sporting Game of 2006" on G4's television series, X-Play.
- It was named the "Game with the most Game" on the Spike Guys' Choice Awards on June 13, 2007.
- It was named BB&B's Sports Game of the year on August 22, 2006.

=== Sales ===
In December 2006, all versions of Madden NFL 07 combined sold 1.9 million units, making it the best-selling title that month in the United States. Overall in 2006, the PlayStation 2 version of Madden NFL 07 sold 2.8 million units, making it the best-selling video game that year in the US, while the Xbox 360 version sold 1.1 million units in the US. The game sold more than 7.4 million copies in the United States by August 2007.

== Legacy ==
In November 2007, Madden NFL 07 was included in EA Sports: 07 Collection along with other 2006 EA Sports games.
