= Engine Down =

American rock band

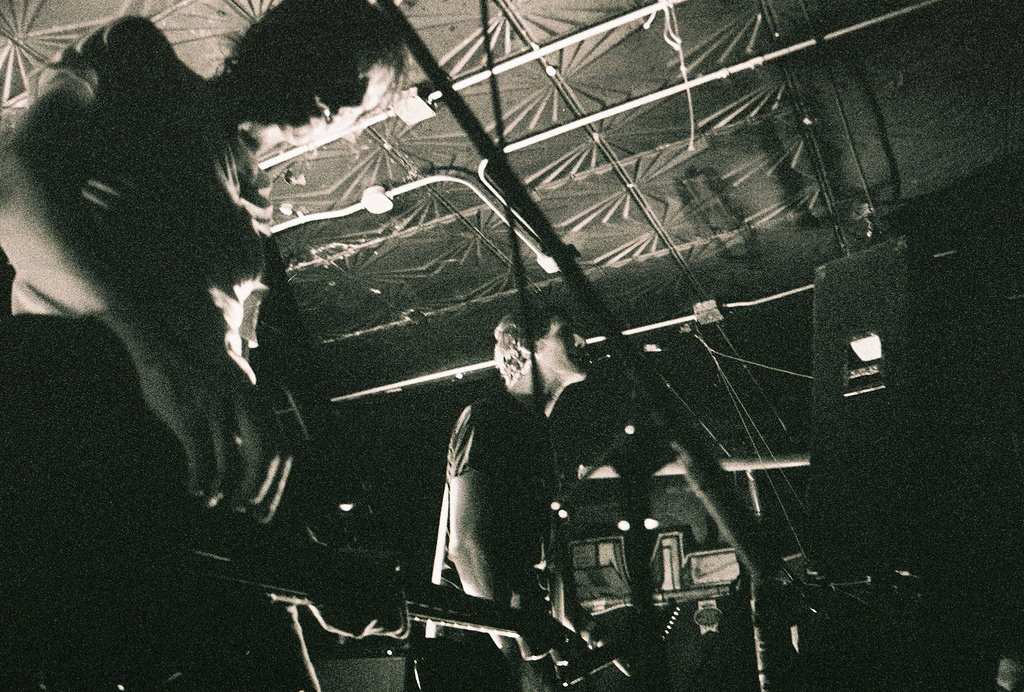
- Farewell Show in Richmond, Virginia, 9/4/05

Background information
- Origin: Richmond, Virginia, U.S.
- Genres: Post-hardcore; emo; indie rock; math rock
- Years active: 1996–2005
- Labels: Lookout, Lovitt
- Past members: Keeley Davis; Jason Wood; Jonathan Fuller; Cornbread Compton; Jeremy Taylor
- Website: Official band site

Engine Down was an American rock band from Richmond, Virginia, active from 1996 to 2005. They were a part of the Washington, D.C. area post-hardcore movement, along with bands like The Dismemberment Plan, Q and Not U, and Faraquet. Engine Down has also earned comparisons to such underground bands as Mineral, Cursive, Pretty Girls Make Graves, and Sunny Day Real Estate. The lineup included Keeley Davis on guitar and vocals, Jason Wood on bass and vocals, Jonathan Fuller on guitar and backup vocals, and Cornbread Compton on drums.

== History ==
Engine Down was formed by bassist Jason Wood, guitarist Jonathan Fuller, drummer Cornbread Compton, and guitarist Jeremy Taylor. Fuller had previously drummed for post-hardcore band Sleepytime Trio. In the band's early days, Wood, Fuller, and Taylor all shared vocal duties. Taylor left, due to being unable to tour, and singer-guitarist Keeley Davis replaced him, initially just for the duration of a tour. After that jaunt, Davis relocated to Richmond and became a full member.

Their initial releases, including 2000's To Bury Within Sound, featured Davis, Fuller, and Wood on vocals. By the time Engine Down recorded 2002's Demure, Davis became took over as lead singer.

In 2005 Engine Down disbanded, following a farewell tour. Davis joined the band Sparta as lead guitarist. Compton began drumming for various bands including Biology, a side project with From Autumn to Ashes members Francis Mark and Josh Newton. Compton then joined Cursive to record their 2009 album Mama, I'm Swollen. Keeley and Jonathan Fuller have reunited in both Denali, and new band, Heks Orkest, featuring Denali member, Cam DiNunzio.

== Members ==
- Keeley Davis – guitar, vocals
- Jason Wood – bass, vocals
- Jonathan Fuller – guitar, vocals
- Cornbread Compton – drums, percussion, piano
- Jeremy Taylor – guitar, vocals (1996–98)

== Discography ==
Studio albums

- Under the Pretense of Present Tense (1999)
- To Bury Within the Sound (2000)
- Demure (2002) - 7.5/10 on Pitchfork, D+ on Stylus
- Engine Down (2004) - 7.7/10 on Pitchfork

EPs and singles

- "2 Song" - 7" (1998)
- "Twelve Hour Turn/Engine Down" - Split 7" (1998)
- Sign of Breath EP/7" (2001)

DVDs

- From Beginning to End (2008)
