= Jim Ward (musician) =

American musician (born 1976)

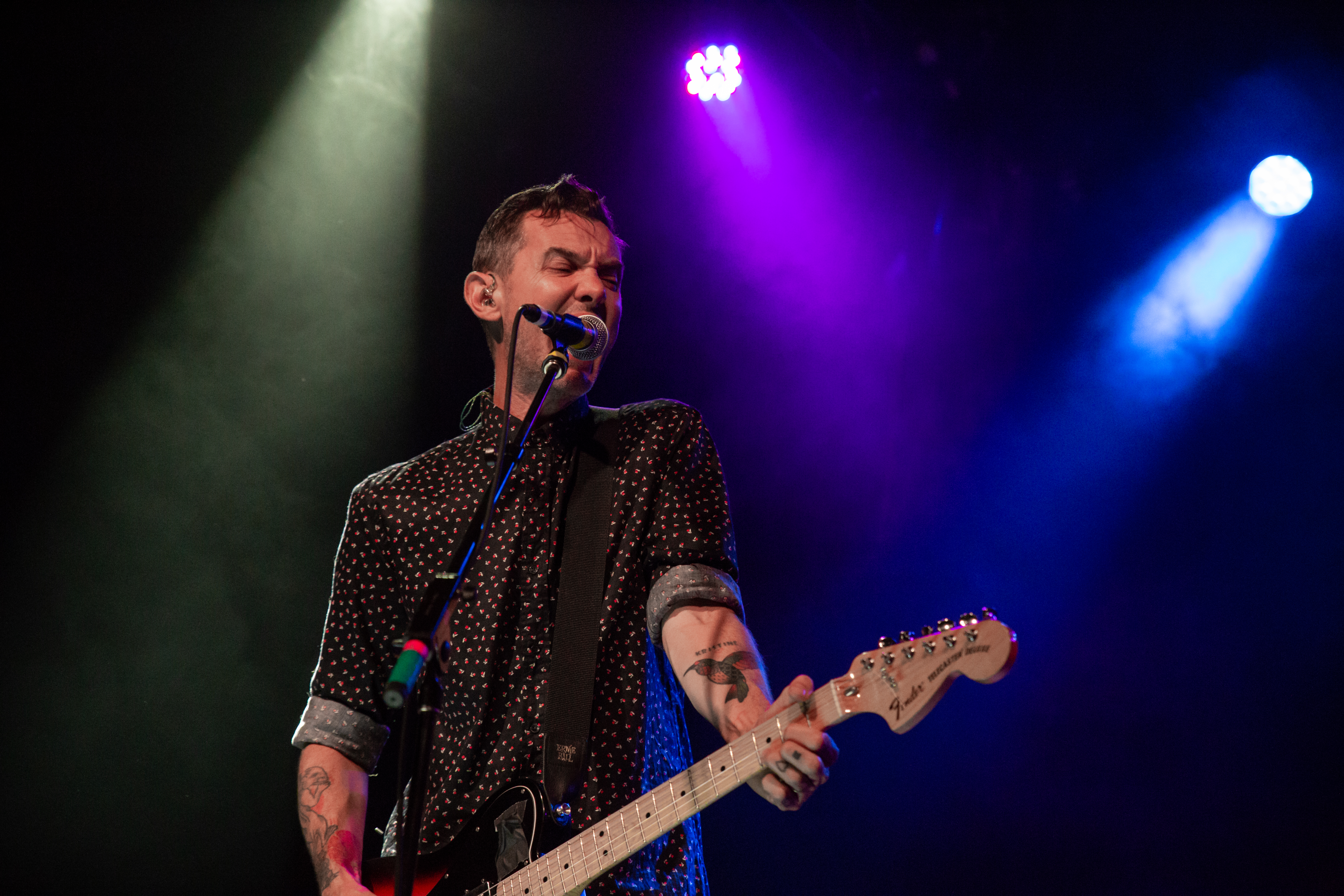
- Ward performing with Sparta

Background information
- Born: James David Ward; September 19, 1976 (age 50)
- Origin: El Paso, Texas, U.S.
- Genres: Alternative rock; indie rock; post-hardcore; art punk; alternative country; Americana
- Occupations: Musician; singer; songwriter
- Instruments: Vocals; guitar; keyboards
- Years active: 1993–present
- Label: Dine Alone Records
- Member of: Sparta
- Formerly of: Sleepercar; At the Drive-In

James David Ward (born September 19, 1976) is an American musician. A self-taught guitarist and pianist, he is the lead singer and guitarist for the alternative rock band Sparta, with whom he has recorded six studio albums. Ward is also a co-founder of the post-hardcore band At the Drive-In, which he formed in 1994 with Cedric Bixler-Zavala.

Between 1996 and 2000, At the Drive-In released three studio albums and several EPs to widespread critical acclaim and an increasing cult fanbase. The band dissolved at the peak of its popularity in 2001, while touring in support of its third studio album, Relationship of Command. Following the band's break-up, Ward formed Sparta with At the Drive-In members Paul Hinojos and Tony Hajjar, releasing three studio albums between 2002 and 2006.

After putting Sparta on hiatus, Ward focused on his alternative country project Sleepercar, releasing one studio album, West Texas, in 2008 and supporting Coldplay and City & Colour on their respective tours. Ward reunited Sparta in 2011 and returned to At the Drive-In in 2012 for a short-lived reunion tour.

== Early life ==
Jim Ward's early musical interests included Billy Joel, Benny Goodman, Subhumans, Pixies, Minor Threat, and Dead Kennedys. Ward started playing guitar and bass, and by age 14 began to be influenced by the Clash, U2, Fugazi, Jawbox, and the Dischord Records roster.

== At the Drive-In ==
While in At the Drive-In, Ward played guitar and sang backup vocals, as well as playing piano and keyboards on select songs. He performed lead vocals on two tracks, "Hourglass" and "Ursa Minor", as well as singing co-lead with lead vocalist Cedric Bixler-Zavala on a number of tracks. Using the money from his college savings, he created the label Western Breed Records to release Hell Paso and Alfaro Vive, Carajo!, At the Drive-In's first two releases. After the demise of At the Drive-In, Ward has stated that he was happy with the break-up, and that he started the band when he was 17 and felt like he was always 17 while in the band.

At the Drive-In reformed for touring in 2012. Days before the subsequent 2016 reunion tour, ATDI announced that Ward would no longer be part of the group, writing, "As our ship prepares for voyage, we announce that Jim Ward will not be joining us on future journeys. We wish him well and are excited to see you soon."

== Sparta ==
Following the split of At the Drive-In, Ward joined with Tony Hajjar and Paul Hinojos as the lead vocalist and guitar player for a new musical project; Matt Miller was later recruited to play the bass guitar. The band, Sparta, wrote nearly nine songs in their first week of rehearsal, with all members incorporating ideas and lyrics. Ward cites Radiohead and Billy Joel as influences for his songwriting during this period, which led to Ward incorporating more piano in Sparta (despite his informal knowledge of the instrument).

Sparta eventually signed a record contract with Geffen and released its debut album, Wiretap Scars, in 2002.

== Solo ==
On June 11, 2021, Ward's solo album Daggers was released by Dine Alone Records.

== Personal life ==
Ward was born in El Paso, Texas. He is a 1994 graduate of El Paso High School. He is the cousin of musician Jeremy Ward.

== Discography ==
=== Solo ===
==== Albums ====
- Quiet in the Valley, On the Shores the End Begins (2011)
- Daggers (2021)

==== EPs ====
- Quiet (2007)
- In the Valley, On the Shores (2009)
- The End Begins (2011)

==== Other appearances ====
- My Favorite Song Writers (compilation – 2004)

- Contributed the song "These Years"

- Paupers, Peasants, Princes & Kings (compilation – 2006)

- Contributed a cover of the Bob Dylan song "Lay Lady Lay"

=== with At the Drive-In ===
- Acrobatic Tenement (1997)
- In/Casino/Out (1998)
- Relationship of Command (2000)

=== with Sparta ===
- Wiretap Scars (2002)
- Porcelain (2004)
- Threes (2006)
- Trust The River (2020)
- Sparta (2022)
- Cut a Silhouette (2026)

=== with Bobby Byrd ===
- How Will We Know When We're Dead? (2006)

=== with Sleepercar ===
- West Texas (LP, 2008)
- Breathe And Count (EP, 2015)

== Equipment ==
=== with At the Drive-In ===
While he was a member of At the Drive-In, Ward used different guitars and amps, as well as several keyboards. The following is a list of some of the equipment Ward performed with during this era:

Guitars

- Gibson Melody Maker
- Epiphone SG Special 1961 50th Anniversary (used at the 2012 Coachella Festival with At the Drive-In)
- Tokai SG-60
- Gibson SG Jr

- Ward has used two of these guitars—a green SG with a white pearl pickguard and a sticker of the Texan flag, and a white version with a tortoise pickguard and a sticker of the Welsh flag. It is difficult to associate a production year with this pair of guitars; whilst both might have been produced before 1965, due to the smaller pick-guard, the guitars also consisted of customized pick-guards (all SG Jr's originally came with black pick-guards) and, therefore, it is possible that they are later models.

- Fernandes Monterey X (custom)

- Ward owned two Monterey X model guitars, one of which had a sticker of the Welsh flag below the bridge.

Amplifiers

- Marshall Cabinet and Head
- Mesa Boogie Head

=== with Sparta ===
Ward uses several different guitars and amplifiers while performing with Sparta. Since the equipment Ward uses changes from tour to tour, the following is a list of some of the equipment he has been seen using.

Guitars

- Custom Fender Esquire

- Ward employs two of these, one yellow with a black pickguard, and one black with a white pickguard (50's Series Re-Issue with a Seymour Duncan Alnico 2 Pickup in the bridge)

- Epiphone SG Special 1961 50th Anniversary
- Ibanez Jetking
- Rickenbacker 330
- Gibson ES-335 (Ebony finish)

- Bridge pickup was later replaced for a Gibson P-94. This guitar was recently stolen from the band's storage facility in Los Angeles.

- '72 Fender Telecaster Deluxe

- Neck pickup, tone and control dials for neck pickup, and pickup selector removed. Ward employs two of these, one with a black pickguard, and one with a tortoise shell pickguard. However, Ward may have replaced the pickguard at some point, therefore only owning one rather than two.

- Gibson SG
- Gibson Melody Maker

Amplifiers

- Vox AC30
- Marshall Cabinet and Head
- Mesaboogie Head
- Park Head

=== Effects pedals ===
- BOSS DD-3 Delay
- BOSS TR-2 Tremolo
- Line 6 DL-4
- BOSS Chromatic Tuner
- Guyatone MD-3
- BOSS GE-7
- Klon Centaur
- Electro-Harmonix Big Muff (Sovtek)
- BOSS DD-3
- Ernie Ball Volume Pedals (2)
