= Jane Sager =

American jazz musician (1914 – 2012)

Jane Sager (1914–2012) was an American big band trumpeter and bandleader. Throughout her career, she played in the bands of Rita Rio, Ada Leonard, Katherine Dunham, Charlie Barnet, and Johnny Richards.

== Biography ==
=== Early life ===
Sager was born in Milwaukee, Wisconsin on June 5, 1914. She began playing violin at the age of six, and by the age of 14, she began performing in local venues. She attended college for violin, and continued her studies at the American Conservatory of Music. She switched to playing trumpet after a car ran over her hand.

=== Orchestral career ===
In the 1930s, Sager began touring with all-female bands, such as the Traveling All-Woman Band led by One-Arm Miller. At this time, she also performed with the Chicago Women's Symphony. In 1940, Sager was a founding member of the All-American Girl Orchestra led by Ada Leonard. Advertisements claimed the band featured the “World’s Greatest Girl Trumpeter Jane Sager”. During World War II, the United Service Organizations contracted the orchestra to perform for enlisted troops.

In 1942, Sager left the All-American Girl Orchestra and earned a spot in a band led by Johnny Richards. She left before they began touring and decided to remain in Los Angeles. She then joined The Victory Belles, a band led by Peggy Gilbert on a radio show geared toward servicemen. She was also briefly in the International Sweethearts Of Rhythm. In 1950, Sager joined the all-female band of Ina Ray Hutton that performed on The Ina Ray Hutton Show.

While with the All-American Girl Orchestra, Sager met Mary Sawyer. Sager and Sawyer partnered to open a trumpet studio in Hollywood, California in the 1950s. The two also organized the Frivolous Five, a musical comedy troupe which Sager led until the late 60s.

=== Later life ===
Later in her life, Sager primarily worked as a teacher in her studio. Her students included Roger Tillison, Chet Baker, and Herb Alpert. Flea, another student of Sager, posited in his memoir Acid for the Children that "if Jane had been a man she'd be acclaimed as a great trumpeter, but sexism is a bitch, and she lived in that little apartment on Selma teaching the likes of me..."

In 1997, Sager was granted the Pioneer Award by the International Women's Brass Conference. In 2002, she was given a Lil Hardin Armstrong Jazz Heritage Award by the International Association for Jazz Education.

She spent her final years in Morro Bay, California. Sager died in 2012.
