= Flea (musician) =

Australian-American musician and actor (born 1962)

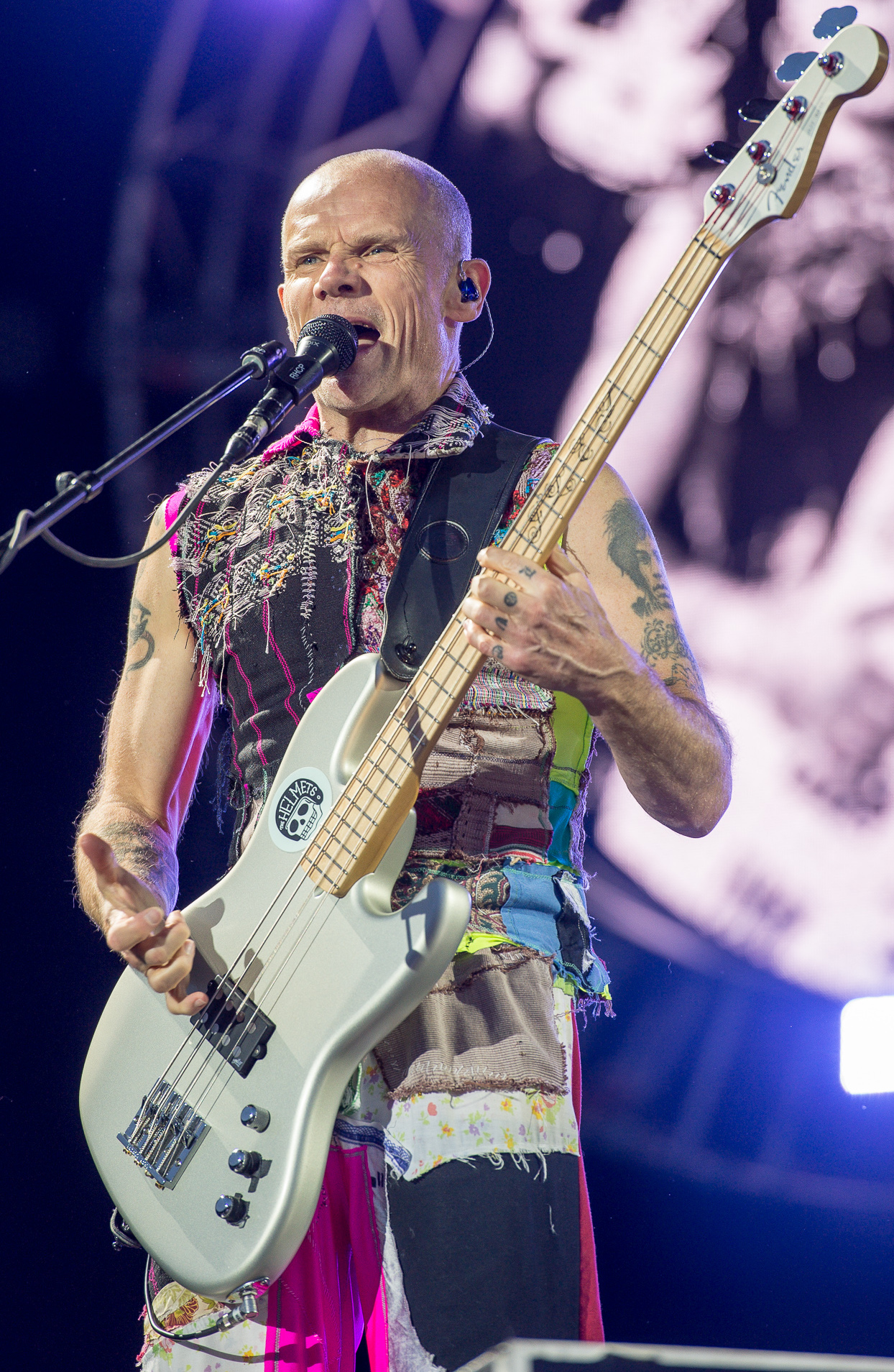
- Flea performing with the Red Hot Chili Peppers in 2016
- Born: Michael Peter Balzary; October 16, 1962 (age 64); Melbourne, Victoria, Australia
- Other name: Mikey B the Flea
- Occupations: Musician; actor
- Years active: 1982–present
- Spouse(s): Loesha Zeviar (m. 1988; div. 1990) Melody Ehsani (m. 2019)
- Children: 3
- Musical career
- Genres: Rock; funk; jazz; electronica
- Instruments: Bass guitar; trumpet; keyboards; vocals; guitar
- Labels: Warner; EMI; Nonesuch
- Member of: Red Hot Chili Peppers; The Honora Band
- Formerly of: Atoms for Peace; Antemasque; Fear; Jane's Addiction; The Mars Volta; Rocket Juice & the Moon; What Is This

Michael Peter Balzary (born October 16, 1962), known professionally as Flea, is an Australian and American musician and actor. He is the bassist of the rock band Red Hot Chili Peppers, and, alongside vocalist Anthony Kiedis, one of two remaining original members of the band. Flea has also been a member of the supergroups Atoms for Peace, Antemasque, Pigface, and Rocket Juice & the Moon, and has played with acts including the Circle Jerks, the Mars Volta, Johnny Cash, Tom Waits, Alanis Morissette, Young MC, Nirvana, What Is This, Fear, and Jane's Addiction.

Flea's playing incorporates elements of funk (including prominent slap bass), psychedelia, punk, and hard rock. In 2009, Rolling Stone readers ranked Flea the second-best bassist of all time, behind John Entwistle. In 2012, he and the other members of Red Hot Chili Peppers were inducted into the Rock and Roll Hall of Fame.

Flea has acted in films and television series such as Suburbia, Back to the Future Part II and Part III, My Own Private Idaho, The Chase, Fear and Loathing in Las Vegas, Dudes, Son in Law, The Big Lebowski, Low Down, Baby Driver, Boy Erased, The Wild Thornberrys, Obi-Wan Kenobi, and Babylon. He is the co-founder of Silverlake Conservatory of Music, a non-profit organization founded in 2001 for underprivileged children. In 2019, he published a memoir of his early life, Acid for the Children. His debut solo album, Honora, was released on March 27, 2026.

== Early life ==
Michael Peter Balzary was born on October 16, 1962, in Melbourne, Victoria, Australia. He is of partial Hungarian and Irish descent. His father, Mick Balzary, an avid fisherman, often took him fishing. When Flea was four, his family moved to Rye, New York, U.S., for his father's work at the Australian consulate in New York. In 1971, his parents divorced, and his father returned to Australia. Flea and his sister Karyn stayed with their mother Patricia, who subsequently married jazz musician Walter Abdul Urban, Junior (1941–2011).

Flea's stepfather frequently invited musicians to his house for jam sessions. The family moved to Los Angeles, California, where Flea became fascinated by the trumpet. He attended private lessons taught by Jane Sager. He had no interest in rock music at the time, instead idolizing jazz musicians like Miles Davis, Louis Armstrong, and Dizzy Gillespie. Flea described his childhood home as violent; his stepfather was aggressive, had an alcohol addiction and eventually became involved in shootouts with police. Flea said: "I grew up being terrified of my parents, particularly my father figures. It caused [me] a lot of trouble later in life." To cope, Flea began smoking cannabis at 13, and became a daily user.

When I was 12 years old, I'd go out 'til 4:00 or 5:00 in the morning, running the streets of Hollywood, looking for hustles, doing little crimes.

When he was 13, after trick-or-treating, he saw kids running down the street in a panic, from his step-father, Walter Urban Jr., who had been firing a gun into the street and screaming, in his underwear, with blood on his face and torso.

He was first called "Flea" as a teenager for his seeming inability to sit still, and the nickname stuck. Nicknamed Mike B. the Flea, he attended Fairfax High School, and was something of an outcast due to his taste in music. At the age of 15, he met Anthony Kiedis, and after a brief confrontation, the two became best friends. Kiedis recalled: "We were drawn to each other by the forces of mischief and love and we became virtually inseparable. We were both social outcasts. We found each other and it turned out to be the longest-lasting friendship of my life."

Flea was introduced to rock music by Hillel Slovak, and particularly punk rock by Kiedis. Flea learned to play bass from Slovak, who shortly after asked him to be a bassist in his band, Anthym. Flea soon developed his own style and joined the group, but quit several months later to play for the punk rock outfit Fear. He then rejoined Slovak to form an intended one-off band: Tony Flow and the Miraculously Majestic Masters of Mayhem along with Kiedis and Jack Irons, all of them at the time inspired by the free funk band Defunkt and the hip-hop act Grandmaster Flash and the Furious Five.

== Career ==
=== Early Red Hot Chili Peppers albums (1984–1987) ===
The band changed its name to the Red Hot Chili Peppers, playing several shows at L.A. venues. Their repertoire grew to nine songs as a result of months of playing at local nightclubs and bars. The Red Hot Chili Peppers entered Bijou Studios to record a demo tape produced by the then-drummer of Fear and subsequently secured a record deal with EMI. Irons and Slovak, however, decided to leave the Red Hot Chili Peppers in order to pursue a "more serious" future with the rock band What Is This? Flea ultimately respected the decision, but felt the band would be lost without them. He and Kiedis hired drummer Cliff Martinez and guitarist Jack Sherman to fill Irons' and Slovak's place, respectively. Andy Gill, formerly of Gang of Four, agreed to produce their first album. Gill and Sherman clashed with Flea and Kiedis; they continuously argued over music style, sound, and the album's production. Flea himself felt that the album was stiff and "a big mistake", but also admitted, "we [he and Kiedis] were just disrespectful and obnoxious." The band's debut album, The Red Hot Chili Peppers, was released on August 10, 1984, to largely poor critical and commercial review. After a relatively unfruitful tour, Sherman was fired in early 1985. Slovak, who had been contemplating a return to the Chili Peppers, rejoined the group after being encouraged by Flea.

Funk musician George Clinton was hired to produce the band's second album, Freaky Styley (1985). The strong chemistry between Clinton and the Chili Peppers was felt instantly. Flea later referred to Clinton as "the warmest, kindest man in the world". Freaky Styley was released in August 1985. It received only a bit more attention than The Red Hot Chili Peppers with roughly 75,000 copies sold by year's end. Flea was somewhat indifferent to the poor album sales as he had recently proposed to girlfriend Loesha Zeviar, who was pregnant with their child. The band hired Michael Beinhorn, their last resort among potential producers, to work on their next album. Irons' band What Is This? had finally disbanded, and he returned as drummer to the Chili Peppers in mid-1986 after Martinez was fired. Flea, Slovak and Kiedis especially were involved in heavy drug use and their relationships became strained. Flea recalled that "it began to seem ugly to me and not fun; our communication was not healthy". Kiedis became dependent on heroin, leaving Flea and Slovak to work on much of the album's material by themselves.

Kiedis was briefly kicked out of the band and given a month to rehabilitate. Kiedis completed the rehab and returned with the Red Hot Chili Peppers in Los Angeles to record their third album The Uplift Mofo Party Plan (1987). Flea has referred to the album as "the 'rockingest' record" the band has ever made. The Uplift Mofo Party Plan proved to be far more successful, commercially and critically, than the Chili Peppers' preceding albums, registering at number 148 on the Billboard 200. Following the Uplift tour, Slovak's drug use dramatically increased. Flea's relationship with Slovak faded, and Slovak became isolated and depressed. On June 27, 1988, Slovak was found dead of a heroin overdose. Flea reflected: "I didn't really know how to deal with that sadness, and I don't think [Kiedis] knew how to deal with it either." Irons, who was taking Slovak's death particularly hard, left the group.

Flea and Kiedis took some time to collect themselves, but they kept the band together. Guitarist DeWayne "Blackbyrd" McKnight and drummer D.H. Peligro were added, and the band entered the studio to record a new album. McKnight soon began to create tension within the group, as his style did not mesh with the rest of the band. Peligro, the former drummer of the punk rock band Dead Kennedys, was a friend of John Frusciante, an 18-year-old guitarist and avid Red Hot Chili Peppers fan. Peligro introduced Frusciante to Flea, and the trio jammed together on several occasions. Flea was impressed with Frusciante's skill, and astonished by his knowledge of the Chili Peppers' repertoire. Flea realized that Frusciante could provide the spark McKnight was lacking. McKnight was fired, and Frusciante accepted an invitation to join the band. Peligro was fired shortly thereafter; the Chili Peppers brought in drummer Chad Smith as his replacement.

=== Mainstream success and side projects (1989–1998) ===
Flea and his wife Loesha started to grow apart, and he began trying to recreate the memories of his adolescence by smoking marijuana on a daily basis. The Chili Peppers entered the studio, and completed recording of their fourth album, Mother's Milk, in early 1989. Upon release, the album was met with mixed reactions from critics, but received far more commercial attention, peaking at number 52 on the Billboard 200. After this, Flea made appearances playing the trumpet on Jane's Addiction's 1988 album Nothing's Shocking, and bass on the critically acclaimed 1989 Young MC album Stone Cold Rhymin'. He would also appear in the video for "Bust a Move", the hit single from the same album.

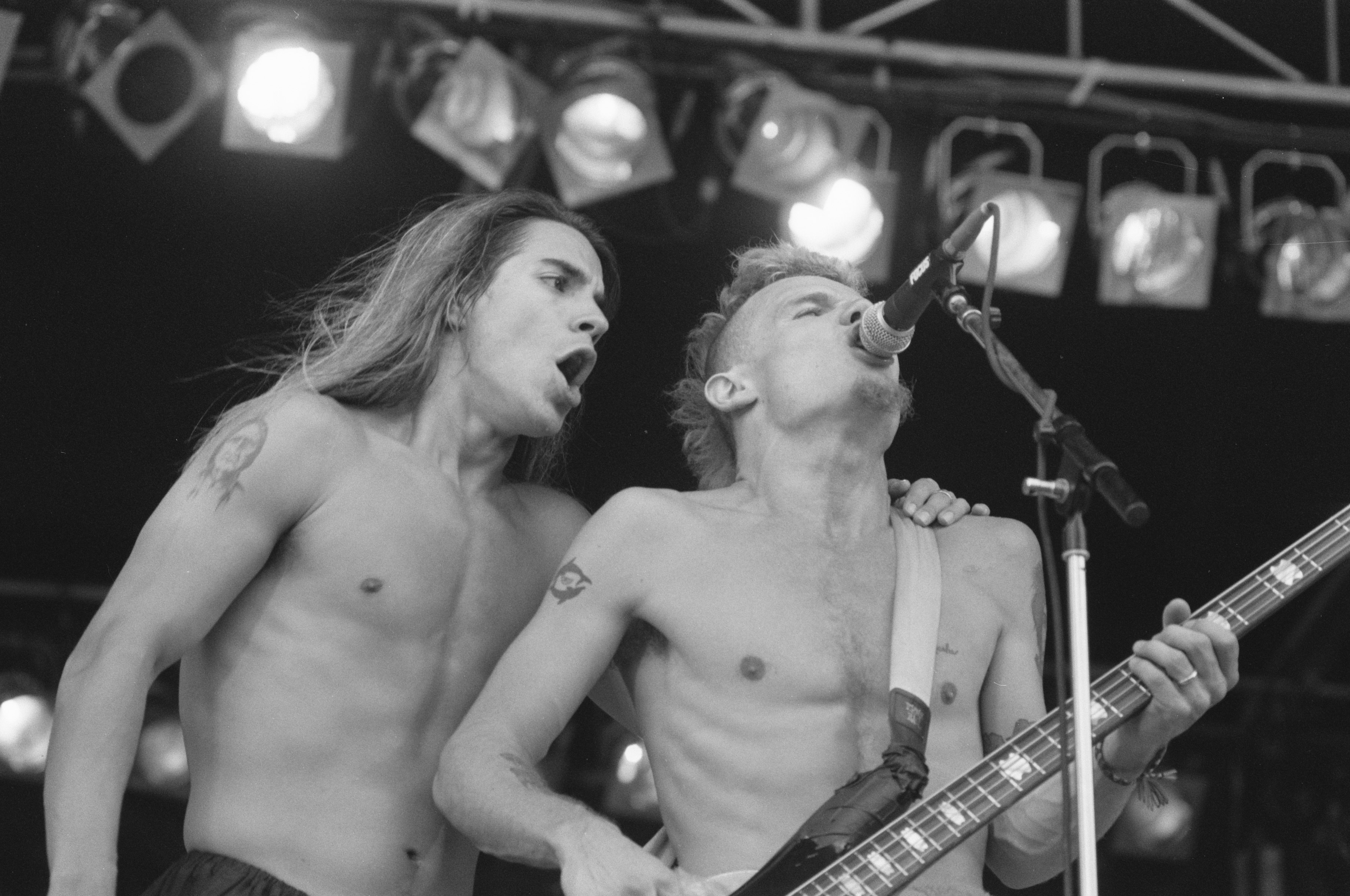
Flea (right) and Anthony Kiedis in Amsterdam, 1989

The Mother's Milk Tour put further strain on Flea's marriage. In order to make money, he needed to tour, and therefore spent time away from his family. Furthermore, he and Smith were arrested on charges of battery and sexual harassment after a performance on MTV's coverage of spring break; charges were eventually dropped. The band was, however, attracting over three thousand people per show; Mother's Milk had been certified as a gold record in early 1990. By the time Red Hot Chili Peppers returned to Los Angeles, Flea and Loesha agreed to a separation. He tried to put the separation out of his mind by smoking marijuana and having sex with random groupies, when the band was on tour for Mother's Milk.

When the successful Mother's Milk tour was over, the Red Hot Chili Peppers severed ties with EMI and signed instead with Warner Bros. Records. Rick Rubin, who had rejected an opportunity to produce The Uplift Mofo Party Plan, agreed to produce their next album. Flea had largely used the principal slap bass technique on the band's preceding four albums, and decided to downplay this style in favor of more conventional, melodic bass lines. To record the album, Rubin suggested they use a mansion that once belonged to magician Harry Houdini. Flea felt it was "a creatively fertile situation", and decided to bring his daughter Clara with him. He and the rest of the band, excluding Smith, remained inside the house for the entire recording process. When not writing or recording the album, Flea spent a large portion of his time with Frusciante smoking large quantities of marijuana. The emotions Flea felt during the album's recording were like nothing he had ever experienced:

When we [the band] made Blood Sugar Sex Magik we spent a lot of time jamming—every day, for hours and hours. I remember during that time Anthony went off and made a movie, and for a long time it was just me, John and Chad, and we'd just go in there and play. Me and John were hitting the bong and we just rocked and grooved forever. It was the first time we went in to make a record where there wasn't this feeling of being sort of intimidated by what was going to happen.

When Blood Sugar Sex Magik was released on September 24, 1991, it received an extremely positive critical response. The album peaked at number three on the Billboard Hot 200, and went on to sell over 7,000,000 copies in the U.S. alone. The album's ensuing tour was critically acclaimed—the Chili Peppers commonly performed shows with over 20,000 in attendance. Seattle-based grunge band Nirvana also toured with them during the West Coast leg of their United States tour. The massive attention the Chili Peppers started receiving, however, caused Frusciante to feel extremely uncomfortable, and he abruptly quit the band during the Japanese leg of the album's tour, replaced temporarily by Arik Marshall. Following the tour in 1993, Flea was diagnosed with myalgic encephalomyelitis/chronic fatigue syndrome (ME/CFS) and was ordered to rest for a year.

On October 30, 1993, Flea was playing at The Viper Room with the band P when his close friend River Phoenix was outside the venue having seizures as the result of an overdose. When this news filtered through the club, Flea rushed outside and accompanied Phoenix in the ambulance that took him to Cedars-Sinai Hospital.

Flea and Kiedis felt it best to fire Marshall due to lack of chemistry and briefly replaced him with Jesse Tobias, although his tenure was very short and he was quickly replaced by Jane's Addiction guitarist Dave Navarro, who was once recruited in 1992 to replace Frusciante. The band was ready now to record their next album although Kiedis was in the middle of a heroin relapse, which forced Flea to assume the role of lyricist, something he had not yet done. He wrote most of the song "Transcending", and the intro and outro to "Deep Kick". Flea also wrote the entire lyric to a song, "Pea", in which he both played bass and sang. These three songs appeared on the Chili Peppers' sixth record One Hot Minute, which was released on September 12, 1995. The album received mixed reviews and was significantly less commercially successful than Blood Sugar Sex Magik. The One Hot Minute Tour was ultimately cut short due to various injuries Kiedis and Smith received, and the Red Hot Chili Peppers decided to go on hiatus. Flea was so miserable that at one point during the tour he discussed quitting the band. Flea began to practice Transcendental Meditation and yoga, and slowly decreased his marijuana consumption. Due to the Chili Peppers' inactivity, Flea joined Navarro in a Jane's Addiction reunion tour in 1997, filling in for ex-Jane's Addiction bassist Eric Avery. Rumors spread, that the band was breaking up until Navarro stated otherwise: "I want to clarify that the Chili Peppers are not breaking up ... Flea and I are more than happy to do both projects, time permitting."

Flea also had plans to record a solo album. He asked Chili Peppers manager Lindy Goetz to help him promote the record and his future solo career. Flea eventually abandoned the idea in favor of offering his bass services to other artists. He performed on over forty records from 1995 to 1998, ranging from Alanis Morissette's Jagged Little Pill (with Navarro) to former Minutemen bassist Mike Watt's debut solo album Ball-Hog or Tugboat?. He also worked with Tori Amos and Michael Stipe on a track for the soundtrack to the 1995 Johnny Depp film Don Juan DeMarco. Navarro was fired from the Chili Peppers in 1998, and Flea questioned whether or not the Red Hot Chili Peppers would stay together: "... the only way I could imagine carrying on is if we got John [Frusciante] back in the band." Frusciante had completed drug rehabilitation in 1997 after a severe addiction to heroin and crack cocaine left him on the brink of death. Flea visited Frusciante in early 1998, inviting him back to the Chili Peppers; an emotional Frusciante readily accepted.

=== Californication, By the Way and Stadium Arcadium (1998–2007) ===
With Frusciante back on guitar, the band began writing new songs during the summer of 1998 in Flea's garage. He and Kiedis were less confident in writing the album after the disappointing results of One Hot Minute. Flea had also recently broken up with his girlfriend of two years, Marissa Pouw, causing him to enter a state of depression which was only lifted when his daughter, Clara who was 10 years old, comforted him after several weeks of crying.

Flea was heavily influenced by electronica during the writing and recording of Californication (1999) and he attempted to emulate this when writing bass lines for the album. Californication took less than two weeks to record; by contrast, One Hot Minute took over a year. When Californication was released on June 8, 1999, it received overwhelmingly positive critical reviews and sold fifteen million copies worldwide—more than Blood Sugar Sex Magik. The Chili Peppers played Woodstock 1999, with Flea playing completely naked—something he would do again at the Reading and Leeds Festivals the same year as well as several other Californication tour concerts.

Red Hot Chili Peppers spent most of 2001 writing their eighth studio album, By the Way (2002). The band began listening to more melodic, textured music, that would reflect heavily on the album. Frusciante became the driving force behind By the Way, causing initial strife between him and Flea. If he introduced a funk rhythm into his bass lines Frusciante would consequently disapprove to the point where Flea almost quit the band because he felt his role was no longer important. By the Way was released on July 9, 2002, to positive reviews, and went on to sell over nine million copies worldwide. The ensuing tour was extremely profitable; the Chili Peppers performed three concerts in London's Hyde Park to over 250,000 attendees and a total gross accumulation of US$17.1 million. It became the highest grossing concert at a single venue in history.

After another two-year world tour, the Chili Peppers wrote their ninth studio album, Stadium Arcadium (2006). Unlike By the Way, both Flea and Frusciante were more musically conjoined when writing the record. They found inspiration in Jimi Hendrix, Jimmy Page, and Eddie Van Halen among others. The double album was ultimately released on May 9, 2006, to generally positive reviews, selling over seven million copies in less than two years. In November 2007, Flea's $4.8 million Corral Canyon home in Malibu burned down in a wildfire. The location was not, however, his primary residence, and at the time of its destruction was being rented to musician and producer Butch Walker.

=== Return to school, Atoms for Peace, I'm with You, and Rocket Juice & the Moon (2008–2011) ===
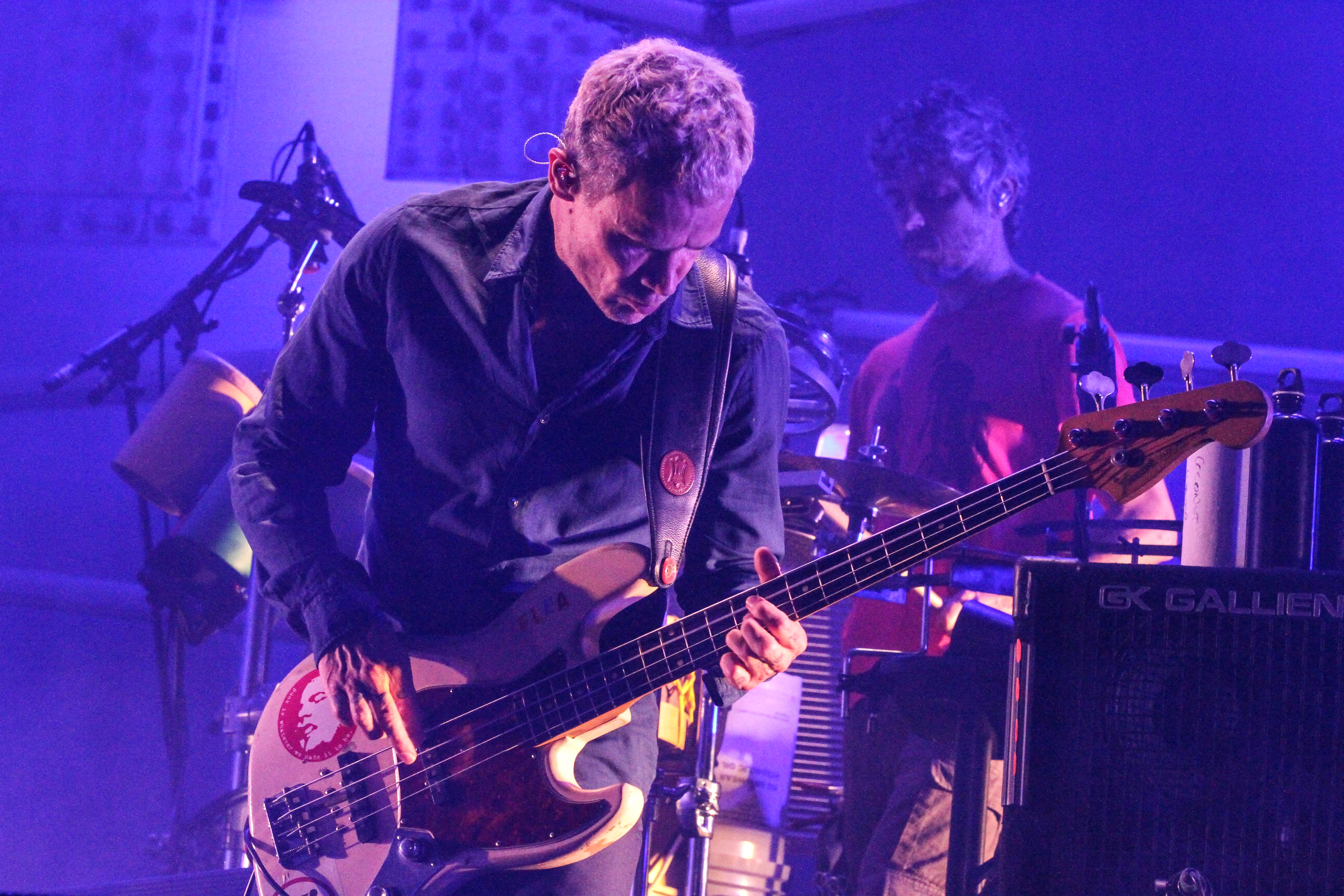
Flea performing with Atoms for Peace in 2013

After the Chili Peppers announced a long hiatus due to exhaustion, Flea enrolled in music classes at the University of Southern California, where he studied music theory, composition and jazz trumpet. Flea attributed his interest to a newfound desire to widen his appreciation and understanding of music: "It's so much fun to learn this stuff because I never knew anything. I played trumpet in the school bands. I learned things I liked to play on my trumpet but I didn't learn why this note goes with this note and why it produces that sound. Or how to create tension in the composition [...] Knowing the structure is really fun." Flea said he planned to release a mainly instrumental solo record, recorded in his home, with guest musicians including Patti Smith and a choir from the Silverlake Conservatory.

In 2009, Flea joined Atoms for Peace, a supergroup formed by the Radiohead singer Thom Yorke to perform songs from Yorke's debut solo album, The Eraser (2006). Flea and the band recreated Yorke's electronic music with live instrumentation. They toured the United States in 2010, and released an album, Amok, in 2013. Amok was followed that year by a tour of Europe, the US and Japan.

The Chili Peppers ended their hiatus in October 2009 without Frusciante, who quit the band to pursue other musical interests. He was replaced by Josh Klinghoffer. The Red Hot Chili Peppers released their tenth studio album, I'm with You, on August 29, 2011. Also that year, Flea played bass on two songs on Tom Waits' album Bad as Me, released on October 21. On October 27, 2011, it was announced that Flea's project with Damon Albarn and afrobeat drummer Tony Allen would be called Rocket Juice & the Moon. The band made their live debut on October 29, 2011, in London, and released an album on March 12, 2012.

In a June 23, 2011, interview, Flea discussed the band's return and how he almost quit the Chili Peppers during their hiatus. Flea said that he wanted to take two years away to see if the band was "something we should still be doing. . . . Things had gotten dysfunctional and not fun, even though I thought we were making great records, doing great shows and were a really powerful, mighty thing as a band. I was proud of what we did. . . . For me, the biggest thing during the time off, and what really made me want to continue doing the band, specifically after [he] decided he didn't want to continue in the band anymore, [was] I just realized, Anthony, man, he's my brother, I love him so much, and we started this band when we were kids. I wanted to keep that going, I never want to let that go. Playing with him is something, even though I can do other things that are exciting and beautiful and I always will do those things and I'll always want to grow and do music outside of the band, the thing that we have is special to us and something that is blood."

=== Rock and Roll Hall of Fame induction, Helen Burns, The Getaway, and memoir (2012–2019) ===
The Red Hot Chili Peppers were inducted into the Rock and Roll Hall of Fame in April 2012. Flea said: "It's always been easy for me to pooh-pooh these awards—the [Rock] Hall of Fame too. But I inducted Metallica a couple of years ago, and it was really a beautiful thing to see as all these people were being inducted. It made me love it. I love halls of fame anyway—the Basketball Hall of Fame, the Baseball Hall of Fame. So I feel grateful for the recognition of what we have done and for the hope and potential of what we'll continue to do."

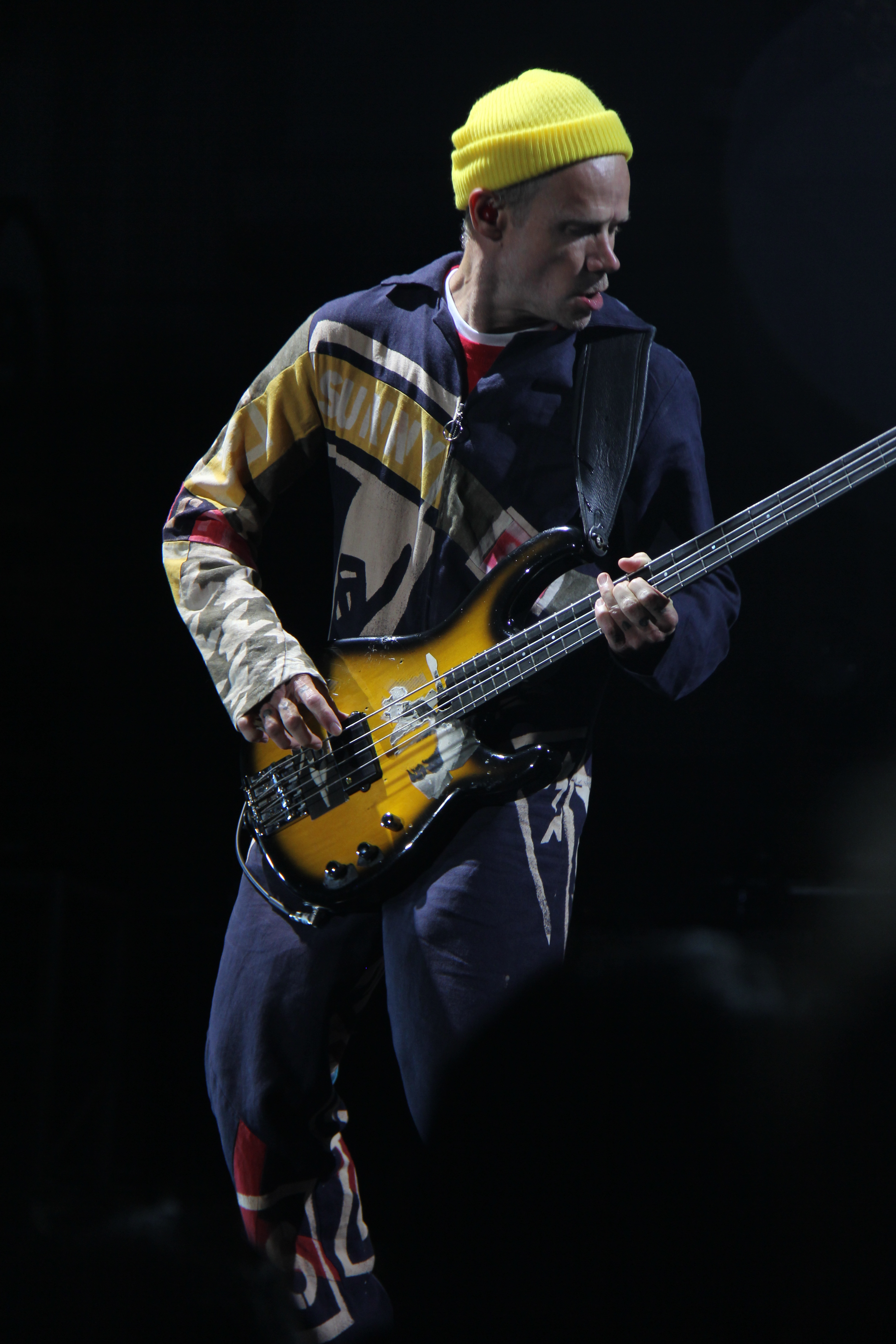
Flea performing with the Red Hot Chili Peppers in 2012

On July 19, 2012, Flea released a solo EP, Helen Burns, composed mainly of instrumental tracks, except the title track (which Patti Smith sang on) and "Lovelovelove", which features the Silverlake Conservatory of Music's kids and adults choir. It is Flea's first solo release, as he had previously released solo songs only on soundtracks and other projects. Flea said of the EP, "I am putting it out to raise money for the Silverlake Conservatory of Music, a community-based non-profit music school that I am an integral part of." The download of the EP is available at "a name your own price" on the Silverlake Conservatory website and was made available through all major digital outlets on August 9, 2012.

On October 16, 2012, his 50th birthday, Flea gave an interview with CNN discussing the Chili Peppers and was asked if he plans to continue with them. Flea responded by saying "I love the Chili Peppers, and I would love to. If there's anything I know, it's every time you start making plans, you don't know what's going to come up next. Anything can happen. So I love being in the Chili Peppers and it's my home, and I've been doing it for more than half my life. Of course, during the course of doing it, there's been all kinds of ups and downs, and moments of extreme (positivity), floating on clouds of greatness, and times of just groveling, and misery, and uncertainty, and anger, and love and all those things. Like being in a family. I really can't predict. But I love being in it for now, and right now, about as far as I'm thinking is getting through this tour that we're doing, performing at the highest level possible, then hunkering down and writing another record."

On April 9, 2014, it was revealed that Flea was working on a new musical project, the band Antemasque, with former Mars Volta members Cedric Bixler-Zavala, Omar Rodríguez-López, and Dave Elitch. Two songs were released in early April, although Flea has confirmed that he is not a member of the band and just recorded a few songs with them. Antemasque released their self-titled debut album on July 15, 2014.

In February 2015, Flea posted photos on his Instagram page showing that he had broken his arm during a skiing trip. His injury delayed the recording of the Chili Peppers' eleventh studio album for six months. Production was expected to resume in mid-August according to Flea, who said on August 3 that he was healed enough to play bass again and continue recording. The Chili Peppers released their eleventh studio album, The Getaway, on June 17, 2016. The band embarked on a 151-date world tour which concluded in October 2017.

Flea released his long-awaited memoir, Acid for the Children, on November 5, 2019. Flea first began the writing process in April 2014. The original scope of the book was to chronicle Flea's unconventional childhood (including his move from a "normal" life in the New York suburbs to a "bohemian" lifestyle in Los Angeles with his jazz-playing stepfather), his adventures in the L.A. streets, his "sometimes complex friendship and collaboration" with Chili Peppers co-founder Anthony Kiedis and the overall "tumultuous creative journey" of the band, which formed in 1983.

=== Unlimited Love, Return of the Dream Canteen and Honora (2020–present) ===
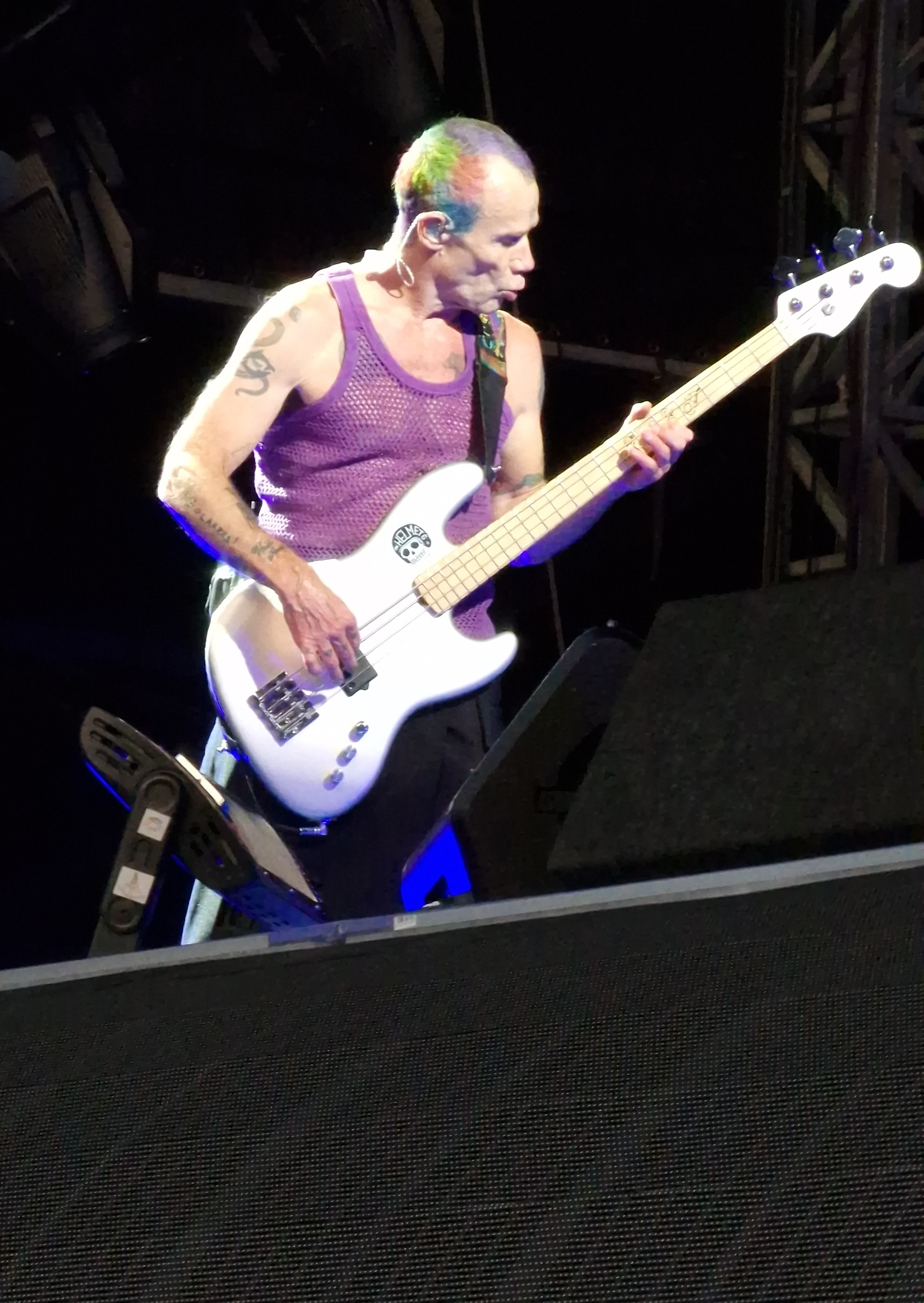
Flea performing with the Red Hot Chili Peppers in 2022

In December 2019, the Red Hot Chili Peppers announced that guitarist John Frusciante would be returning to replace Josh Klinghoffer. The band then focused on preparations for making a new album, which they originally hoped to have released in 2020, along with performing on a few festival dates. The Chili Peppers began working on their twelfth studio album in the summer of 2020; however, due to the COVID-19 pandemic, there were delays in the writing and recording, with their 2020 tour dates being postponed until 2021.

In August 2020, Flea appeared on two unreleased songs from River Phoenix's band Aleka's Attic to mark what would have been his 50th birthday.

In the same month, Flea was featured playing bass on multiple tracks on the Bright Eyes studio album Down in the Weeds Where the World Once Was.

In January 2021, it was announced that Flea and John Frusciante contributed a cover of "Not Great Men" to the upcoming tribute album to Gang of Four titled The Problem of Leisure: A Celebration of Andy Gill and Gang of Four. The double album was released on June 4, 2021.

In October 2021, the Chili Peppers announced the dates for their 2022 world tour that began in June 2022 and will conclude in July 2024. The tour includes the band's first-ever headlining stadium shows in the United States in support of their twelfth and thirteenth studio albums, Unlimited Love and Return of the Dream Canteen, which were released on April 1 and October 14, 2022, respectively.

Flea, along with Josh Klinghoffer and Chad Smith, collaborated with Morrissey on his upcoming album Bonfire of Teenagers, which was supposed to be released in February 2023. However, in December 2022 it was announced that its future was in limbo, as Capitol Records has decided not to release it. On May 16, 2025, it was reported by Deadline that a documentary on the Red Hot Chili Peppers' formative years was being secretly screened at the Cannes Film Festival and was looking for select buyers in both New York and Los Angeles. A festival premiere for the film was to be planned for either fall 2025 or early 2026. The documentary, which is being co-produced by Hillel Slovak's brother James, will center on the deep childhood bond between Flea, Anthony Kiedis, and Hillel Slovak, and features various interviews from current and past band members.

Flea performs trumpet on the song "My Plane Leaves Tomorrow (Au Revoir)" on Al Jardine's 2025 EP, Islands In The Sun. Neil Young is also featured on the song. On December 4, 2025, Flea released "A Plea", the first single (with a music video directed by his daughter Clara Balzary) from his debut solo album Honora, which is due for release on March 27, 2026 on Nonesuch Records. The album features six original songs and four cover songs along with appearances by Thom Yorke and Nick Cave. The second single, "Traffic Lights", featuring Yorke, was released on January 14, 2026, along with an animated music video. Flea embarked a small tour in May 2026 to promote the album.

In February 2026, Flea confirmed that the Chili Peppers are currently in the writing process for their fourteenth studio album. “We’ve been writing music together, recording at John Frusciante’s house, and the music feels great. Ultimately, once we start playing, it’s about… just catching a magic groove and doing it good." Flea performed on The Tonight Show Starring Jimmy Fallon on March 23, 2026.

=== Film and television ===
Flea has pursued a minor acting career since the mid-1980s. His first role was as young punk Razzle in the Penelope Spheeris film Suburbia (1984). Shortly thereafter he starred alongside the Chili Peppers, who played themselves, in the skate drama Thrashin' (1986). He played the ill-fated punker Milo in another Penelope Spheeris film, Dudes (1987). He also made an appearance in the Bruce Weber documentary film about the life and career of jazz trumpeter Chet Baker titled Let's Get Lost (1988). He portrayed the character Douglas J. Needles in Back to the Future Part II (1989) and Back to the Future Part III (1990), though in an interview he referred to Part II as "a multi-million-dollar piece of trash", saying that he was happy neither with the film nor his performance in it.

Flea played a minor role in the 1991 independent film My Own Private Idaho as the character Budd. He played a number of minor roles in films throughout the 1990s, including Son in Law (1993) as a tattoo artist, The Chase (1994) as a monster truck driver alongside Kiedis, Fear and Loathing in Las Vegas (1998) as a "Hippie", in The Big Lebowski (1998) as a German nihilist, and the 1998 remake of Psycho. He has also lent his voice to the Nickelodeon animated series The Wild Thornberrys as the character Donnie. In 1992, Flea and the other Red Hot Chili Peppers appeared as themselves in the animated comedy The Simpsons on the episode "Krusty Gets Kancelled".

In 2011, Flea appeared in the documentary Bob and the Monster. The film details the life of musician and drug counselor Bob Forrest.

Flea appears in the documentary The Other F Word, which aired on Showtime and was released through Oscilloscope Laboratories, a company founded by Adam Yauch. The documentary, which was directed by Andrea Blaugrund Nevins, focused on a generation of punk rockers, how they have handled fatherhood, and how they went from public rebel to domestic authority figure. Mark Hoppus, Jim Lindberg, Art Alexakis, and Mark Mothersbaugh were also featured.

Flea made his return to acting and co-starred in the 2014 film Low Down, which is based on the life of jazz pianist Joe Albany. Flea along with Anthony Kiedis executive-produced the film, which stars John Hawkes, Elle Fanning, Glenn Close, and Peter Dinklage. The film had a successful debut at the Sundance Film Festival in January 2014 and opened in limited release in October 2014. It was released in March 2015 on DVD. This marked his first acting role in 14 years. The film was directed by Jeff Preiss, who previously worked with Flea on the 1988 documentary Let's Get Lost. In 2015, he provided the voice of the "mind cop" Jake in the Pixar film Inside Out. He reprised the role in the 2024 sequel, Inside Out 2.

In 2015, Flea appeared as himself in the Amazon Prime series Highston. It was announced in 2017 that Amazon Prime had cancelled plans for a full series of the show.

Flea plays Eddie No-Nose in Edgar Wright's action feature film Baby Driver (2017). That same year he had a cameo appearance during the fifteenth season of the FOX animated television series Family Guy in an episode titled "Peter's Def Jam". In a scene where Stewie Griffin said to his dog Brian Griffin that thanks to him, there's a recurring flea problem in Stewie's room, Flea enters and plays a bass line. He asks Brian if he wants to hang out, but Stewie kicks Flea out of the room.

Flea co-stars with Lucas Hedges, Nicole Kidman and Russell Crowe in the 2018 film Boy Erased.

On February 16, 2018, Flea took part in the 2018 NBA All-Star Celebrity Game on a team led by Canadian musician Justin Bieber.

On June 2, 2021, it was announced that Flea would star alongside Brad Pitt, Margot Robbie and Samara Weaving in the 2022 film Babylon, which was directed by Damien Chazelle. This film is set in the late 1920s during the film industry's transition from silent films to talkies and explores the rise and fall of multiple characters. It was released on December 23, 2022.

Flea appears in the Disney+ Obi-Wan Kenobi series, aired on May 27, 2022. The series is directed by Deborah Chow, who directed the 2022 music video for the Red Hot Chili Peppers single "Black Summer".

Flea appears in the 2025 film Arco as Frankie, alongside Mark Ruffalo, Natalie Portman, and others.

Flea appeared on the PBS documentary series Finding Your Roots on January 6, 2026.

== Personal life ==
As an adult, Flea became a U.S. citizen. In a 2000 interview, he stated his intention to eventually retire to his native Australia.

=== Family and relationships ===
Flea has been married twice and has three children. From 1988 to 1990, Flea was married to Canadian Loesha Zeviar (Loesha's name remains tattooed on Flea's chest). The two started dating when Zeviar, born in July 1969, was sixteen years old. Their daughter, Clara Louise Zeviar Balzary, was born in 1988. Clara was featured in the band's Funky Monks documentary. She also has appeared at many shows and, as a child, provided artwork for the band's T-shirts and promotional material. She has also documented the band's I'm With You tour through photographs and videos. As an adult, Clara was in the short-lived band the Tints and is also an artist and photographer, taking the promotional photographs for The Getaway.

Flea was engaged to model Frankie Rayder, who was once named GQ magazine's sexiest woman in the world. The couple never married, however they had a child together, Sunny Bebop Balzary, who was born in 2005. The song "Hard to Concentrate" on the Chili Peppers' 2006 album, Stadium Arcadium, was written by Kiedis as a wedding proposal to Flea and Rayder. Flea and Rayder since split up.

In 2019, Flea got married for a second time to fashion designer Melody Ehsani. Flea said of Ehsani, "My life has changed forever and I am eternally humble and grateful. The person who sees all of me and knows who I am. My wife @melodyehsani." Ehsani gave birth to their son, Darius Booker Balzary, in 2022.

On May 22, 2026, Flea announced on Instagram that his older sister Karyn Balzary had passed away.

Flea appeared in the 2011 documentary The Other F Word, where he discussed the joys of being a father. "It's funny how you always hear people saying that classic parent attitude of, 'I brought you into this world, I gave you life!' You know, it's just, I think, completely the opposite. My kids gave me life. They gave me a reason."

=== Drug addictions ===
In February 2018, Flea released an op-ed through Time magazine about the opioid crisis as well as his own personal history of drug addiction about which for most of his career he had been very private. Flea hoped that by exposing his past issues with substance use that his stories could possibly help others battling their own addictions and raise more awareness on the need for those in the medical community and the government to help those in need. "I've been around substance abuse since the day I was born. All the adults in my life regularly numbed themselves to ease their troubles, and alcohol or drugs were everywhere, always. I started smoking weed when I was eleven, and then proceeded to snort, shoot, pop, smoke, drop and dragon chase my way through my teens and twenties," Flea said. Flea finally kicked his addictions in 1993; however, he revealed that in 2014 when he broke his arm in a snowboard accident he nearly had setbacks due to oxycontin that his doctor prescribed for him: "My doctor put me back together perfectly, and thanks to him I can still play bass with all my heart. But he also gave me a two-month supply of Oxycontin. The bottle said to take four each day. I was high as hell when I took those things. It not only quelled my physical pain, but all my emotions as well. I only took one a day, but I was not present for my kids, my creative spirit went into decline and I became depressed. I stopped taking them after a month, but I could have easily gotten another refill. Addiction is a cruel disease, and the medical community, together with the government, should offer help to all of those who need it."

=== Spirituality ===
In a June 2023 interview with the Los Angeles Times, Flea discussed his views on religion saying "Yeah, I'm a praying guy. I pray in the morning when I get up, when I go to bed, when I eat. And when I do an interview, I'll just stop for a second — like, let me get out of the way and let go of everything." When asked who he was praying to Flea replied that he was praying "To God. I'm not religious in any way, but I kind of believe in God. And I try to live a life that honors my idea of what God is — like a divine energy." In the early 1990s, Flea experienced chronic fatigue attributed to his lifestyle of "non-stop partying and drugs." His discovery of a self-help book by Jon Kabat-Zinn prompted a significant shift in his spiritual views.

=== Legal issues ===
In 1990, Flea was arrested in Daytona Beach, Florida, and charged with battery, disorderly conduct, and solicitation to commit an unnatural and lascivious act, and Chili Peppers drummer Chad Smith was charged with battery, after the two were accused of "attacking a woman" in the audience of one of their performances; as reported by a ranger from Volusia County:

Balzary and Smith jumped into the crowd. / Balzary picked up the woman and began to spin her around on his shoulders, while Smith pulled her bathing suit to one side and began to slap her bottom... / [Unnamed officials also] said Balzary got on top of the woman, asked her to perform a sex act, then began to simulate the act.

The woman "apparently was picked from the audience at random", and "[a]fter [she] cried for help, the band was escorted away." According to the same ranger, the victim "signed a complaint against the band members" (which resulted in the charges filed).

=== Political activism ===
Flea and the Chili Peppers appeared in 1992 PSA ads for Rock the Vote, a non-profit organization created to encourage 18- to 24-year-olds in the United States to vote in the upcoming presidential election.

The Chili Peppers were invited by the Beastie Boys and the Milarepa Fund to perform at the Tibetan Freedom Concert in June 1996 in San Francisco. They also performed at the June 1998 Washington, D.C., concert. The concerts, which were held worldwide, were to support the cause of Tibetan independence.

In October 2008, Flea (along with his daughter Sunny Bebop) appeared in a Vote for Change ad voicing his support for Barack Obama for president of the United States in the upcoming election. The Chili Peppers performed a free concert in downtown Cleveland on April 15, 2012, in support of President Barack Obama's re-election campaign.

Flea has been outspoken towards guns and gun violence, sometimes speaking about it during Chili Peppers shows. He often expresses his anger on Twitter. In 2013, he said, "Why anyone would ever want to own an automatic weapon I will never ever understand. It's a pathetic, useless concept for sick people. Automatic, semi automatic, I don't care. I'm against em........ Melt em all down, turn em into sculptures; there is no need for them on earth. In many countries, the cops have no guns and they do perfectly fine. No civilians should be allowed to have guns. none. And I don't think the cops should have guns either. Change the constitution". Following the racially motivated Charleston church shooting in June 2015, Flea again voiced his anger towards gun violence, saying: "You are kidding me. This is too much. Humans are an over rated species. Sick. God help us." and "The USA land where any sick madman can easily get a gun. disgusting, deplorable, unbelievable."

On September 18, 2015, Flea and his Chili Peppers bandmates were among over 120 entertainers and celebrities to announce that they would be voting for Bernie Sanders in the 2016 election for President of the United States. In February 2016, the Chili Peppers performed at a "Feel the Bern" fundraiser in support of presidential candidate Bernie Sanders. Flea said, "Bernie Sanders is the only remotely reasonable candidate for President of the United States."

=== Environmental activism ===
Flea has been vocal about climate change. On May 11, 2013, the Chili Peppers performed a special concert in Portland, Oregon, for the Dalai Lama as part of the Dalai Lama Environmental Summit. According to the press release, "The musical element of this event is intended to be a display of joyful celebration and an inspiration to future generations to care for our planet. The Red Hot Chili Peppers have been great supporters of the Tibetan cause, of His Holiness the Dalai Lama, and of the need to work to protect and preserve our environment."

Flea took to his Facebook page in anger speaking out about the May 19, 2015, Santa Barbara oil spill that pumped 100,000 gallons of crude oil into the Pacific Ocean. Flea was at the beach with his young daughter when she stepped in a tar ball. Flea wrote "Dear plains all American pipeline, my daughter just dared step on the beach for a few minutes where we live about 75 miles from the Santa Barbara oil spill you caused. She got your oil shit product all over her feet." Flea stated he can no longer surf there or take his daughter to the beach further saying "Some kid in the hood who made a mistake selling drugs will go to jail and have his life ruined but you, you evil lying scumbags will get away with a paltry fine that means nothing to you. You could have had a shut off valve but you saved cash there too. You are the worst kind of human beings, I am infuriated you disgust me."

In August 2015, Flea added an apiary in his backyard which includes three beehives with approximately 60,000 bees each—over 200,000 bees total—in his backyard in efforts to restore the honeybee population. Flea commented on his new obsession with beekeeping by saying: "Deep to the hive super organism. I love my bees. Flea's bees."

Flea performed in the Pathway to Paris concert in December 2015. The all-star event aimed to raise awareness about the urgency of climate action and coincided with the UN Climate Change Conference in Paris.

Flea stated in January 2019, "the destructive effects of climate change are ongoing and will be difficult for us human beings to deal with." Days later the Red Hot Chili Peppers performed at a benefit concert for victims of recent deadly Woolsey Fire in California which killed four people and destroyed over 1,500 homes. The fires even halted the recording for the Chili Peppers' twelfth album.

On April 26, 2020, Flea performed during "The Pathway to Paris Earth Day 50: A Virtual Festival", a livestream event to celebrate the 50th anniversary of Earth Day. The festival streamed on an Instagram page.

=== Philanthropy ===
In 2001, Flea co-founded the Silverlake Conservatory of Music with his childhood friend Tree. The school is dedicated to help youth progress in music. Flea said he wanted to "fill the void" created by the lack of public funding for school music departments: "I grew up in LA public schools and was in the music department. It was really an important thing for my life, it gave me something to hold onto, and it was an important access for me. Without music I would've gotten into a lot of trouble and there are a lot of kids like me out there. I just wanted to try to provide something like what I got." On March 20, 2011, Flea ran the Los Angeles Marathon to raise money for the Silverlake Conservatory of Music through Crowdrise. Flea was also featured in Runner's World magazine discussing his preparation for the race.

In September 2005, the Chili Peppers performed "Under the Bridge" at the ReAct Now: Music & Relief benefit which was held to raise money for victims of Hurricane Katrina.

In May 2015, Flea asked fans to donate to the Special Olympics. Two fans were to be selected to be flown out to meet Flea for private bass lessons. Other prizes such an exclusive T-shirts, personalized video from Flea, tickets to a Red Hot Chili Peppers concert and various autographed items by Flea are available.

The Chili Peppers performed at a fundraiser on behalf the non-profit organization San Diego Foundation on September 27, 2015. All money was donated to ARTS — A Reason To Survive, Heartbeat Music Academy, San Diego Young Artists Music Academy, and Flea's Silverlake Conservatory of Music. Flea and bandmate Anthony Kiedis host an annual benefit for the Silverlake Conservatory of Music. In October 2015, the event was limited to 300 tickets at $2,500 each. The Chili Peppers performed an acoustic set, and John Legend headlined.

In August 2016, Flea paid a visit to see Koko the gorilla and to also raise awareness for The Gorilla Foundation. The foundation said of Flea's visit "One of Koko's favorite musicians, Flea from the Red Hot Chili Peppers came to visit. Koko was thrilled by the mellow sounds and a jamming session followed with Koko strumming on Flea's bass!"

Flea joined Brad Pitt during the COVID-19 pandemic to help contribute to a community food giveaway for the people of Watts, Los Angeles, on July 31, 2020. "The community gives back to me. I like being a part of it, I like building bridges, I like making friends. When corona hit and I was sitting around and going to the beach and stuff, I did a lot of thinking about people who really might be struggling because they're not getting enough to eat and not making money during COVID times," Flea said.

=== Sports ===
Flea is a devout fan of the Los Angeles Dodgers, Los Angeles Rams, and most notably the Los Angeles Lakers. Flea first held Lakers season tickets in 1988 and has often been spotted sitting courtside at Lakers games with some of his bandmates. Two songs recorded for the 1989 album Mother's Milk were tribute songs to Hall-of-Fame Lakers players Magic Johnson and Kareem Abdul-Jabbar. Flea performed the national anthem on April 13, 2016, in honor of Kobe Bryant's final game with the team before his retirement. Following the Rams' return to Los Angeles in 2016, Flea and the Chili Peppers performed an impromptu pregame show for fans at the Los Angeles Memorial Coliseum. Upon the team's return to Los Angeles, Flea and Chad Smith have both owned season tickets since 2016.

Flea has occasionally performed a bass rendition of "The Star-Spangled Banner" before games of the Los Angeles Lakers at the Crypto.com Arena (formerly called Staples Center) in a similar manner as Jimi Hendrix. One notable rendition was before NBA superstar Kobe Bryant's final game against the Utah Jazz, on April 13, 2016.

He is also known to be a fan of English football team Sheffield United.

== Instruments and sound ==
=== Basses ===
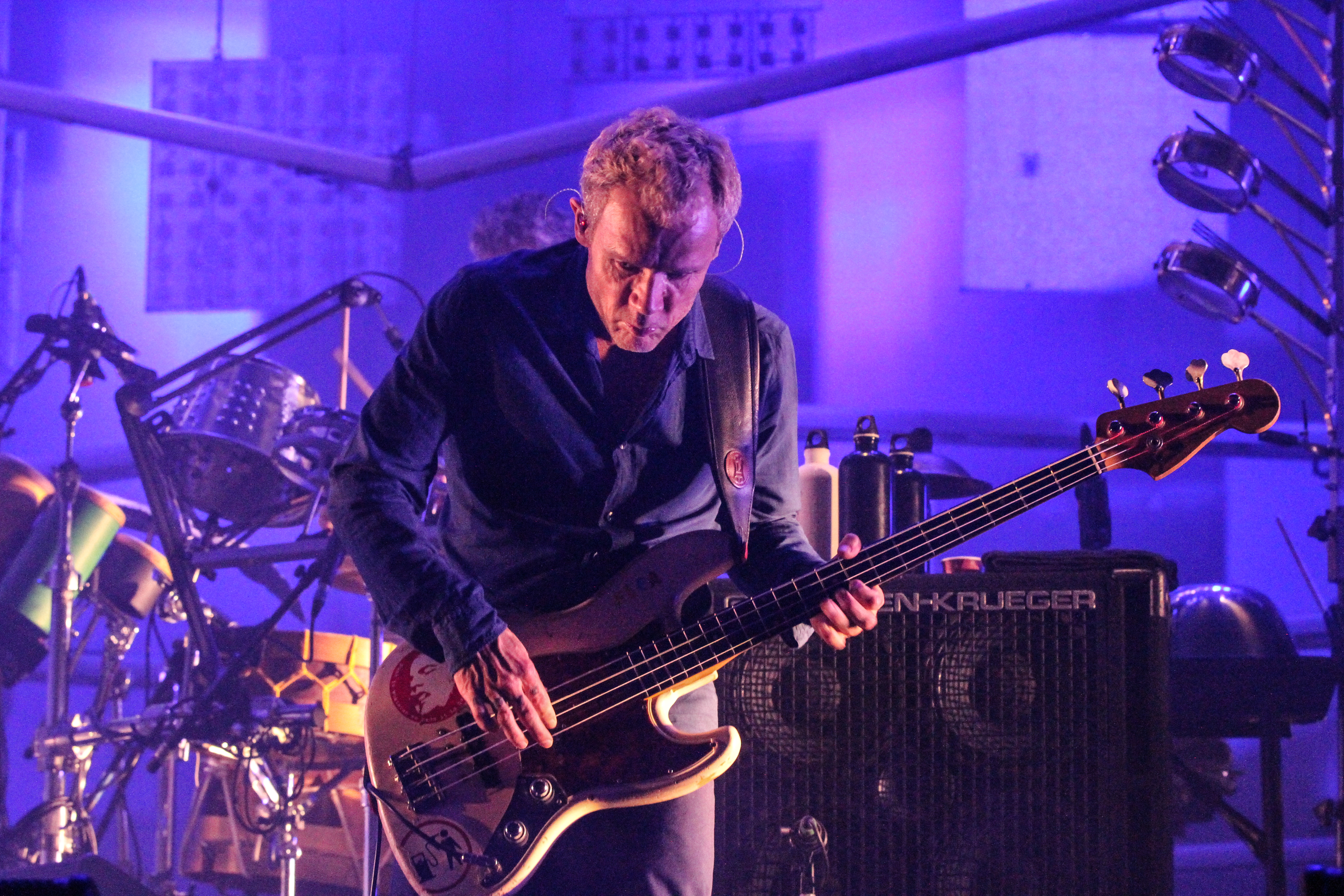
1961 Jazz

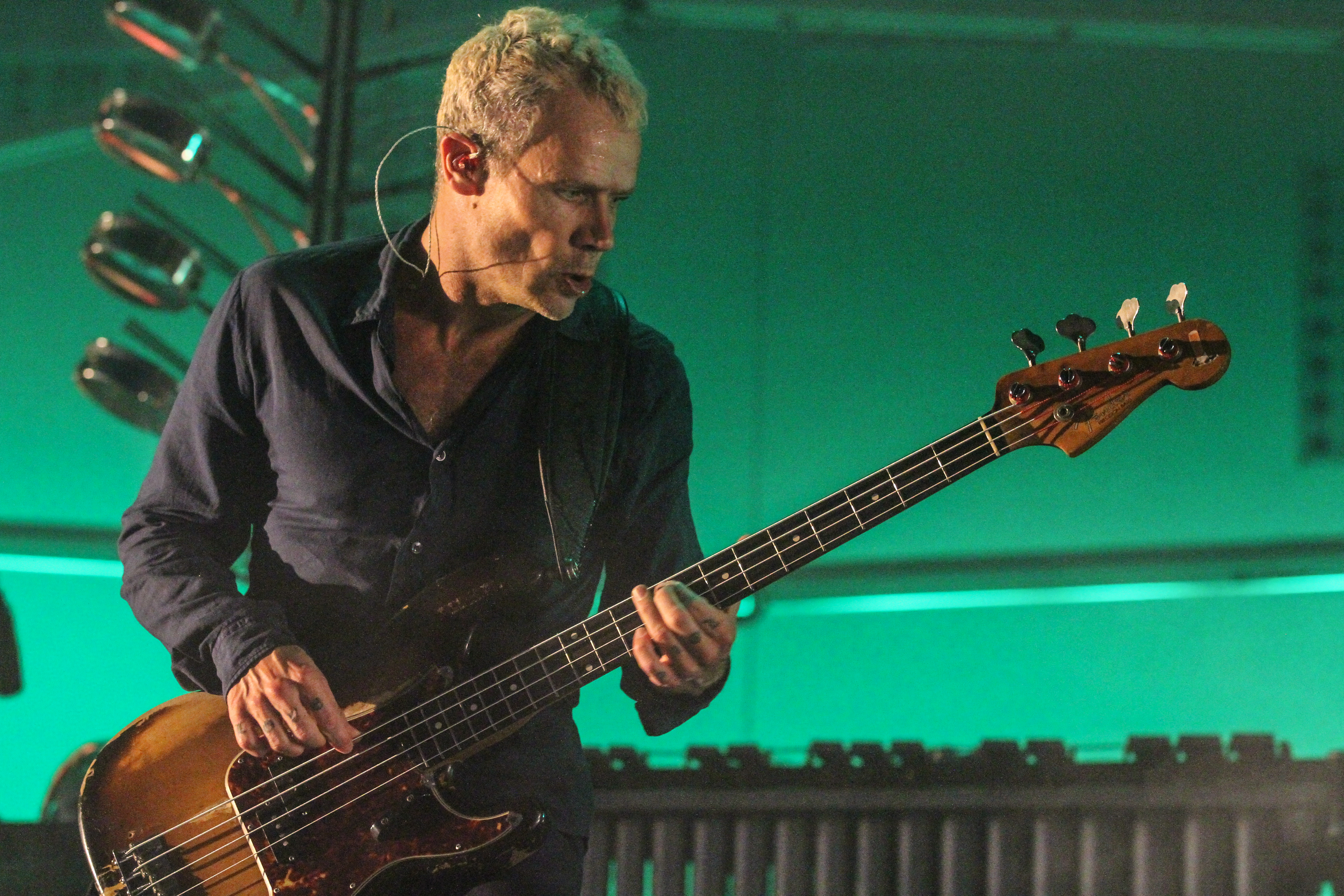
Precision

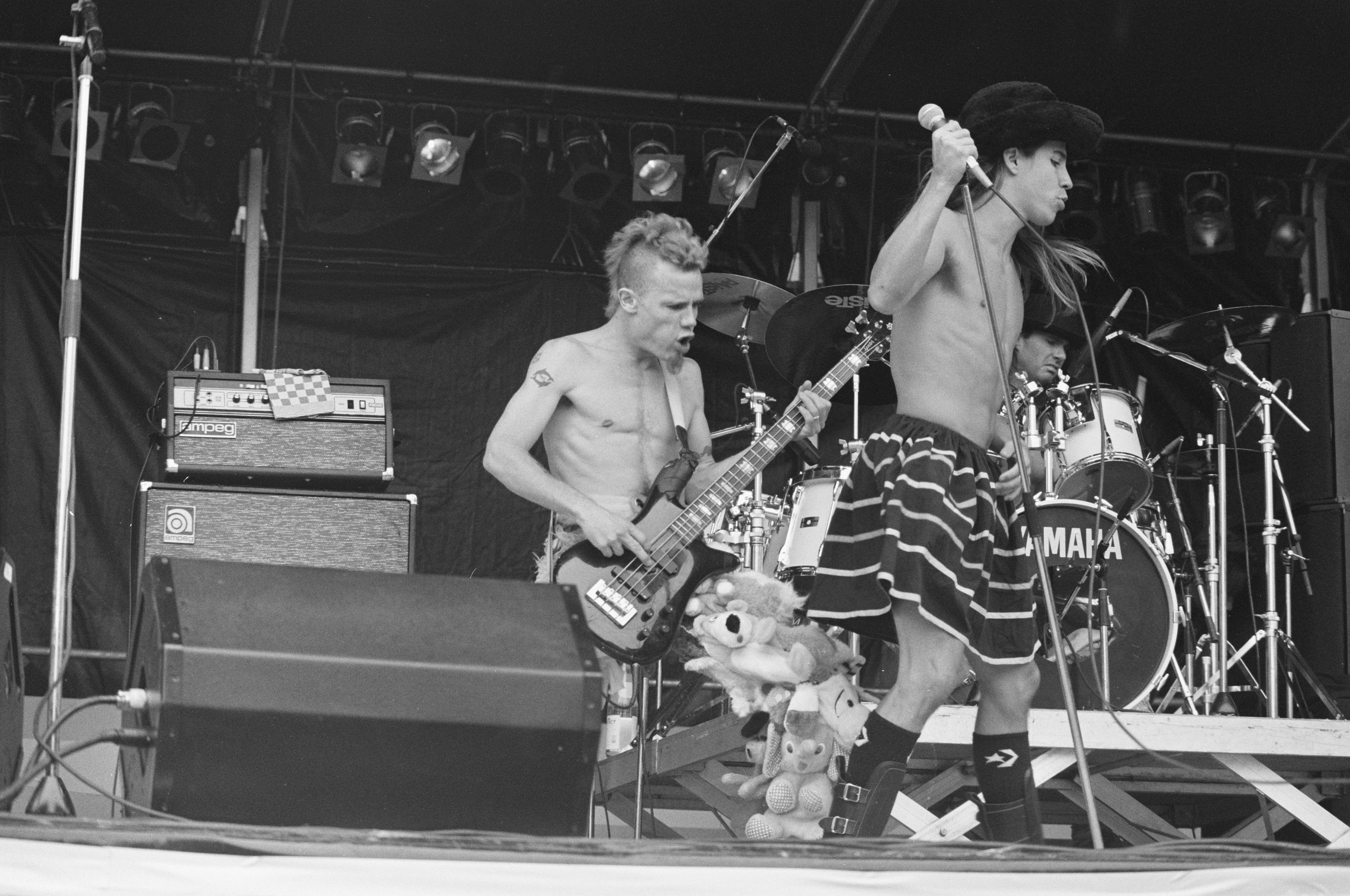
Spector NS-2

Flea has employed a wide variety of basses over his career with some varying exclusivity, such as Music Man, Modulus, his own brand Fleabass, and Fender Jazz and Precisions.

Currently, his main stage bass is a Custom Shop Fender Jazz Bass, modified with a Lane Poor pickup and Aguilar OBP-1 preamp, largely identical to the Modulus basses he previously used. Fender has released this bass for sale as the Flea Signature Active Jazz Bass (no longer in production as of 2020), in addition to a signature instrument modeled after his 1961 Fender Jazz Bass (which has been his primary studio bass since 2006); Flea treasures his 1961 Jazz Bass for its "old wood sound".

According to the Flea Bass Rig (Part 1) video he used the following over the years in order of appearance.

- Music Man Cutlass 1 (No longer in production)
- Fender Precision Bass (In black seen live in 1989)
- Spector NS-2 with 2 jazz pickups (Seen in "Fight Like A Brave")
- Spector NS-2 (Seen in "Taste The Pain")
- Teisco Del Ray NB-4 (Used in the video for "Higher Ground", not used to record)
- Wal Mk 2 (Seen in "Suck My Kiss")
- Music Man Stingray 4 (Seen in "Aeroplane")
- Music Man Stingray 5 string (Seen in "Under The Bridge")
- Alembic Epic 4 (Seen in "My Friends")
- Modulus signature basses (see below)
- 1961 Fender Jazz Bass (Pre CBS)
- Fleabass (Flea's own brand of bass from his business that was active from 2009 to 2011)

==== Signature Modulus Flea Bass ====
"Californication" bass remains (RRHoF)

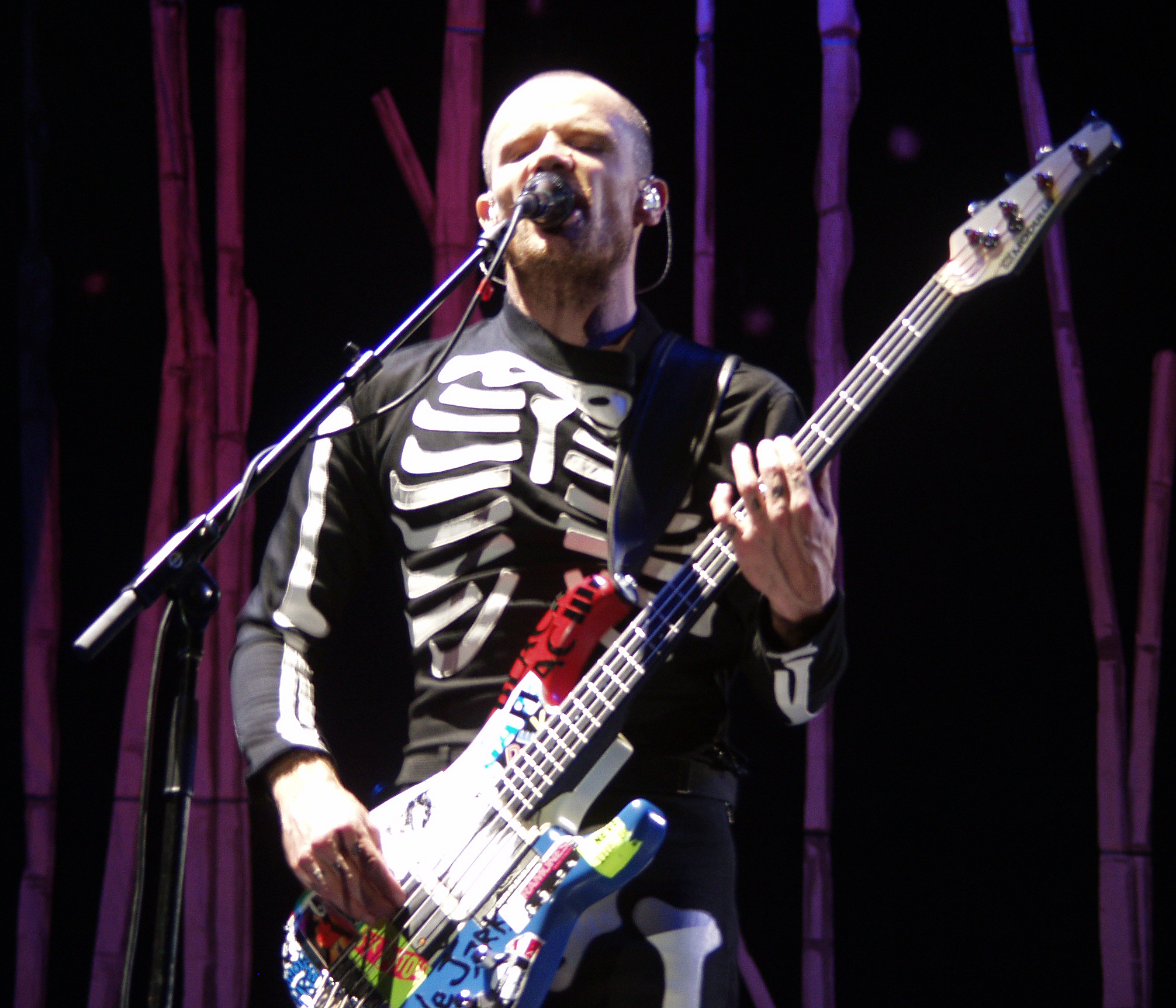
Red, White, and Blue

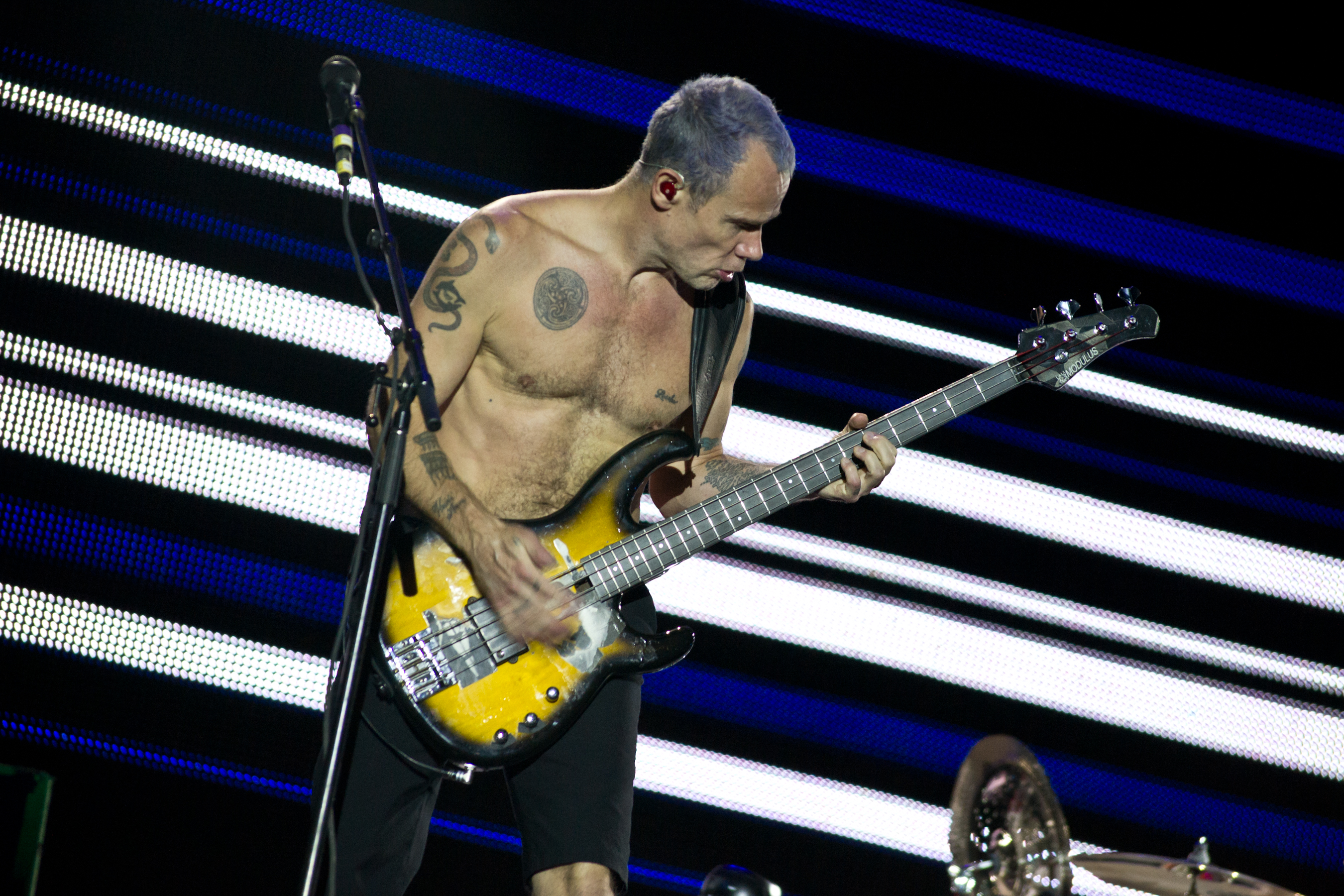
Sunburst

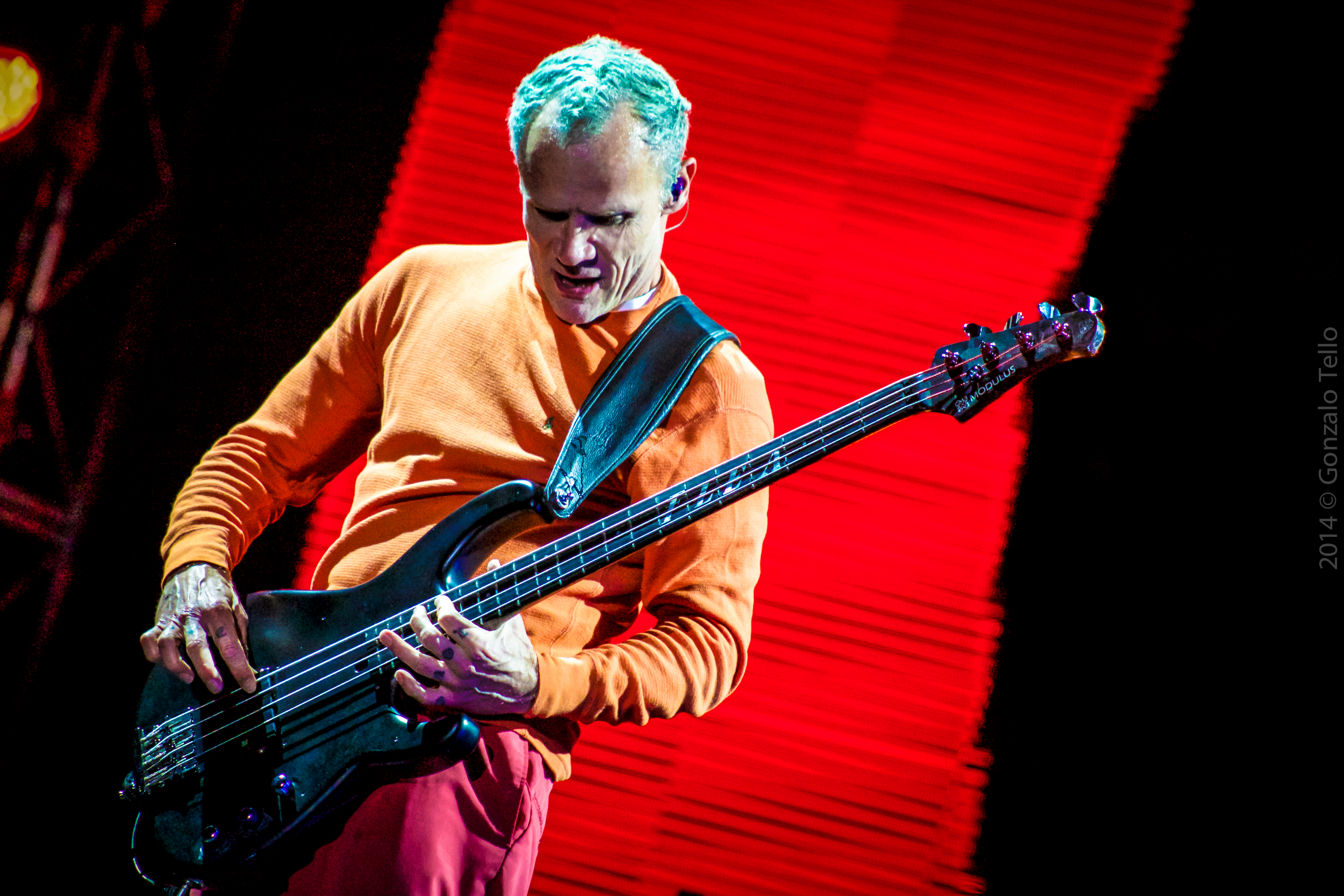
Black

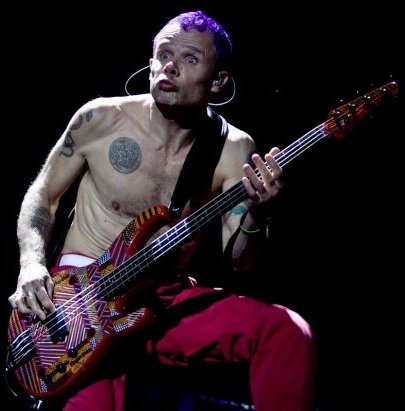
Aboriginal pattern

The specific designs seen over this time include:

=== Signature Modulus Flea Bass ===
Flea toured the Californication, 2001, By The Way, Roll on the Red, Stadium Arcadium, I'm With You, and 2013–2014 tours with his signature Modulus Flea basses (later renamed Modulus Funk Unlimited after the endorsement). Available in 4- and 5-string versions, Flea was seen with several designs over this time.

His primary silver flake Modulus instrument from 1997 to 1999 was used to record the Californication album and served as his main live bass during his performances with Porno for Pyros, Jane's Addiction, and the Red Hot Chili Peppers. The bass was smashed at the 1999 KROQ Weenie Roast following an encore after an altercation involving fans and security. In April 2024, Flea expressed public regret for the destruction on social media, stating he felt like an "idiot" for breaking it. The remains of the instrument were later placed on display at the Rock and Roll Hall of Fame in Cleveland, Ohio.

The specific designs seen over this time include:

- Silver Sparkle (used in all appearances from 1997 until its destruction in 1999)
- Blue Sparkle (seen in Off the Map)
- Silver Sparkle (seen in Live at Slane Castle)
- Red, White, and Blue (with punk band stickers overlaid on the body; seen in Live at Slane Castle)
- Aboriginal pattern (in Drop D tuning for "By the Way")
- Australian Aboriginal flag (in E♭ tuning for "Breaking the Girl")
- Black (originally in Sunburst)

==== Fleabass (Multi-Coloured Deluxe Spin basses) ====
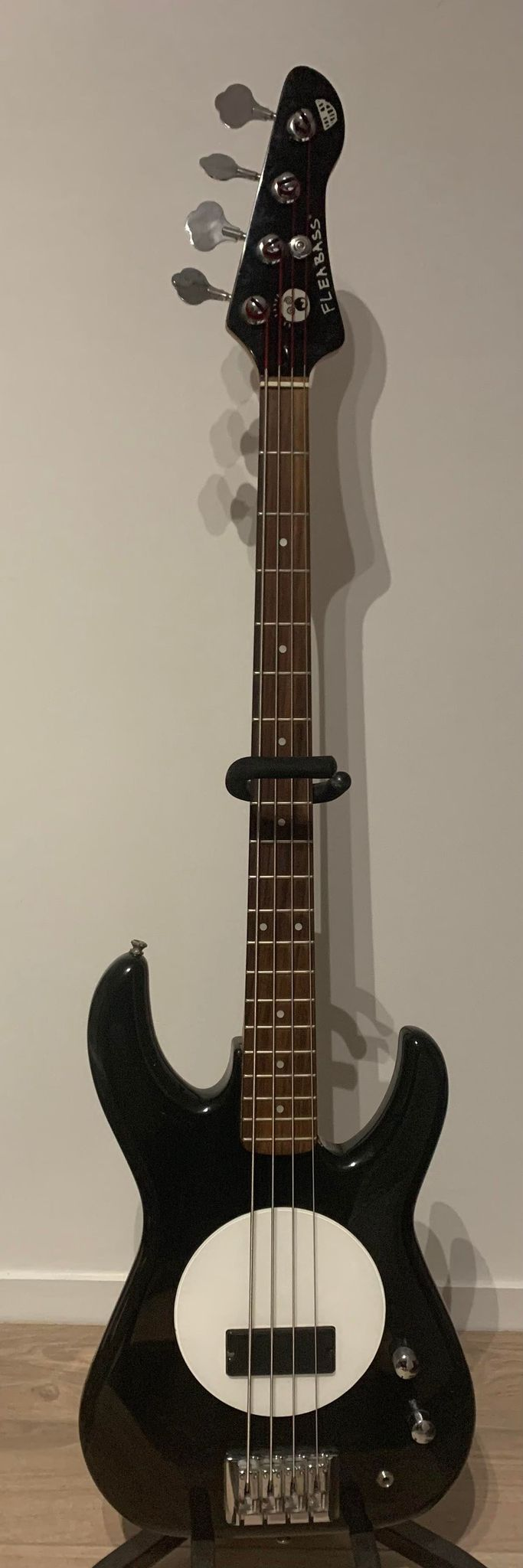
Black and White

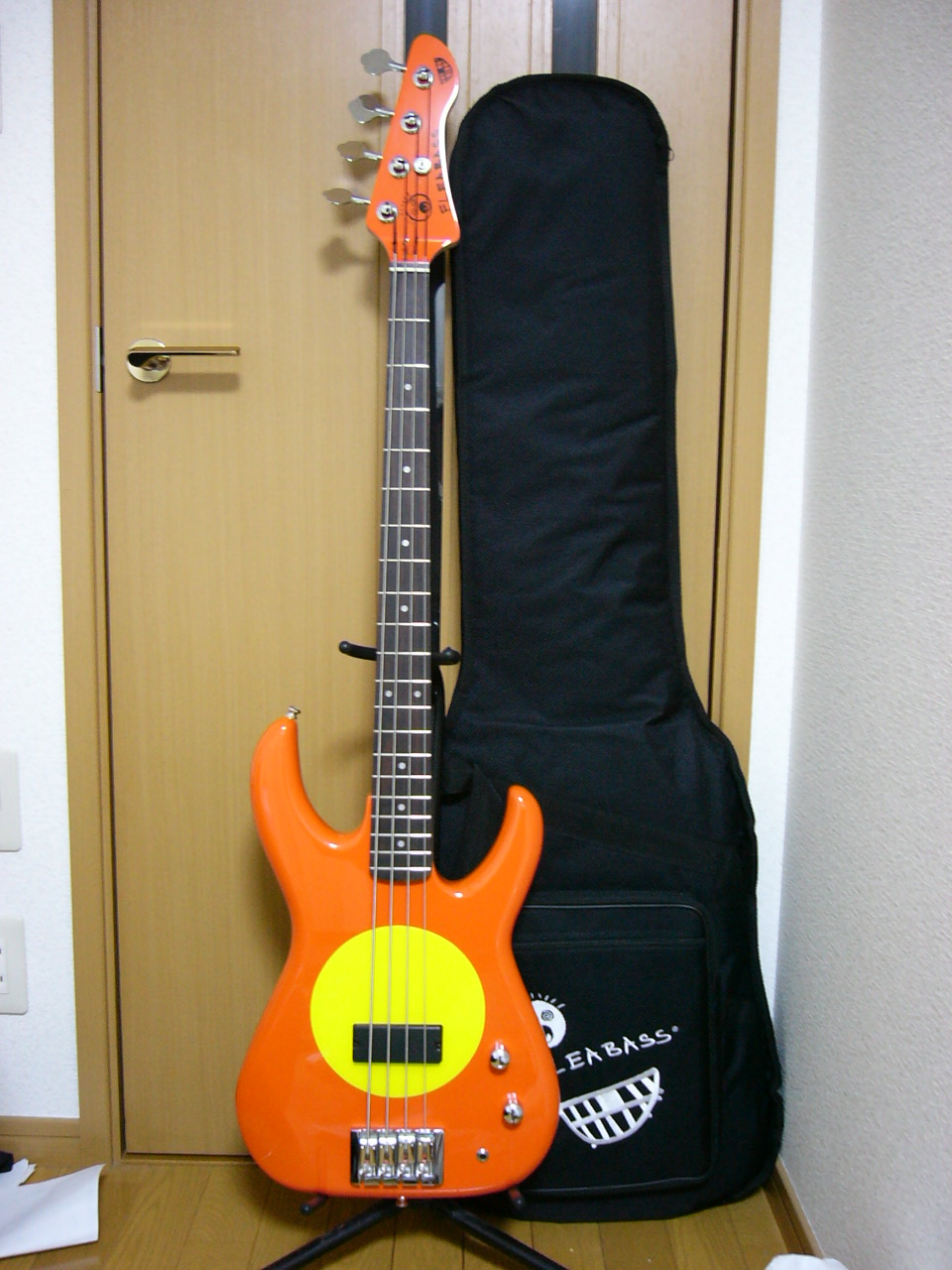
Orange and Yellow

In 2009, Flea founded the Fleabass company with the goal to create quality budget basses for beginners. Whilst Flea did not perform with his own Fleabass production model he did however use a custom model created by UK artist Damien Hirst.

Damien actually made me a bass, a butterfly bass, it's a beautiful thing. It's not just a piece of art to hang on a wall. The whole new album I play on it. This bass is kind of heavy for live—I don't play Fenders that much live—but it's beautiful.

The custom Fleabass was built with Lane Poor active pickups, Graphite neck, and 18-volt Aguliar OBP-1 preamp. It can be seen in the music videos for The Getaway album.

Fifty of these basses were created. They were auctioned for Flea's Silverlake Conservatory of Music, with a list price of £50,000.

==== Fender Custom Shop ====
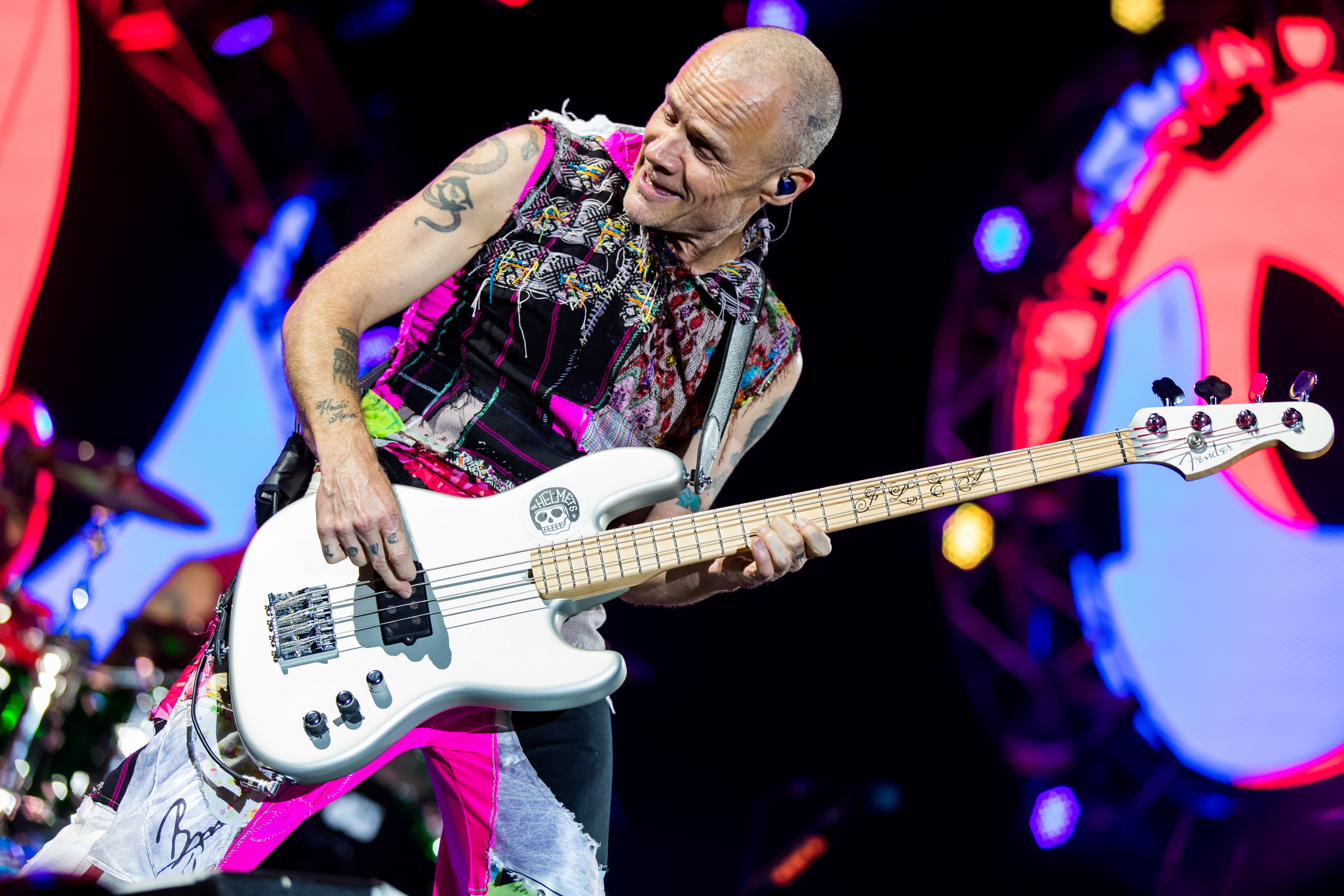
Silver

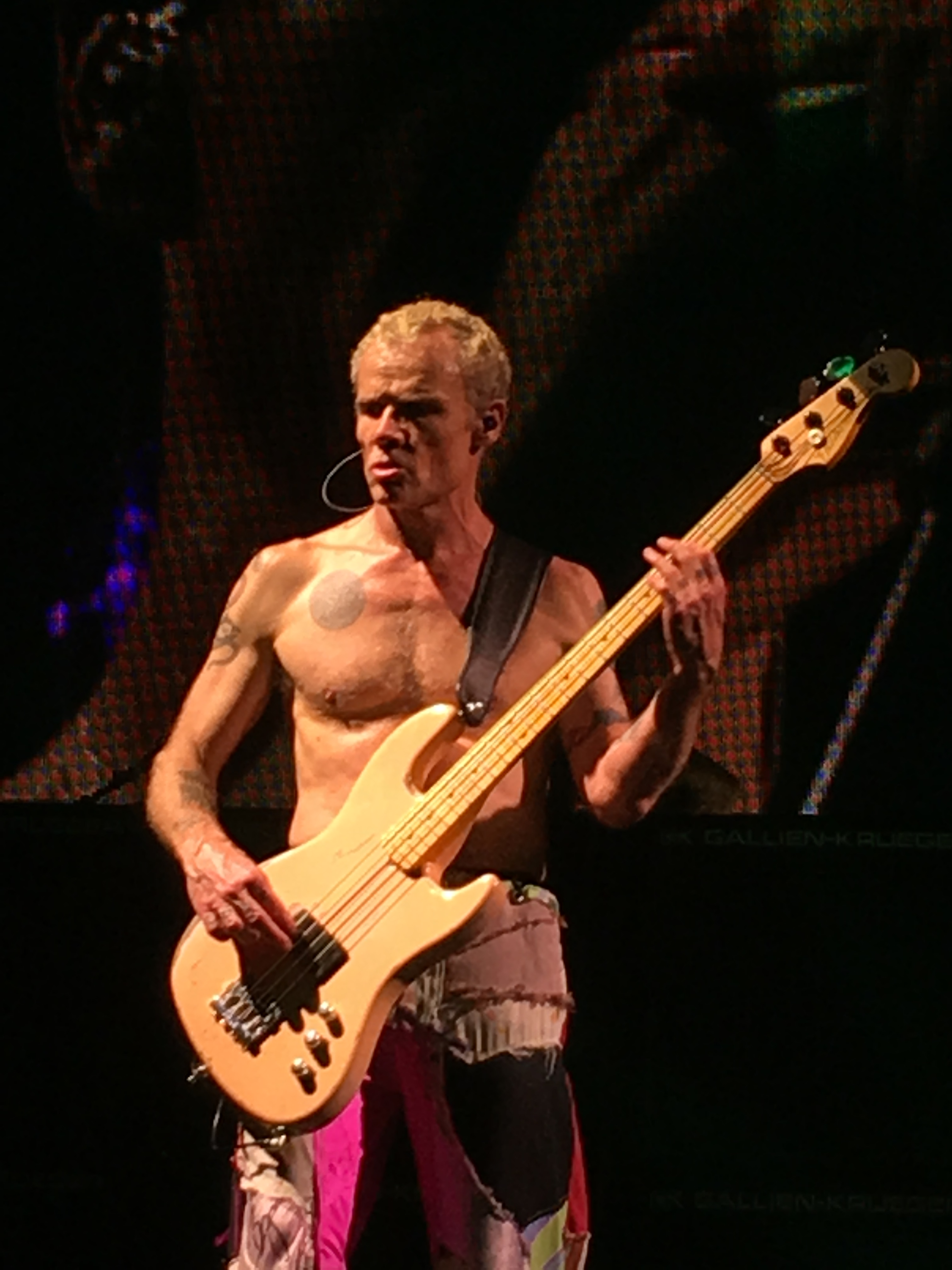
Road-worn Pink

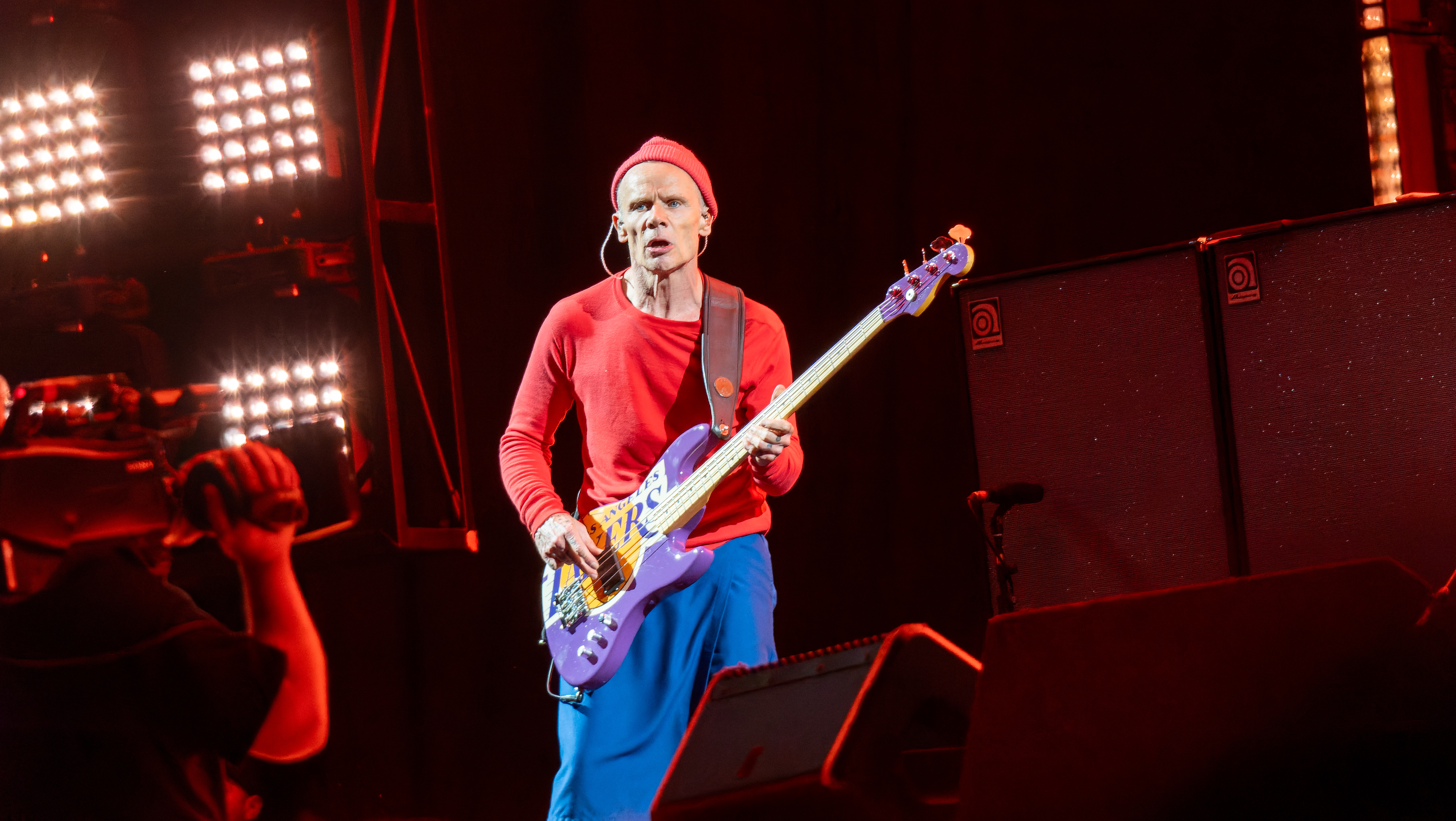
Purple

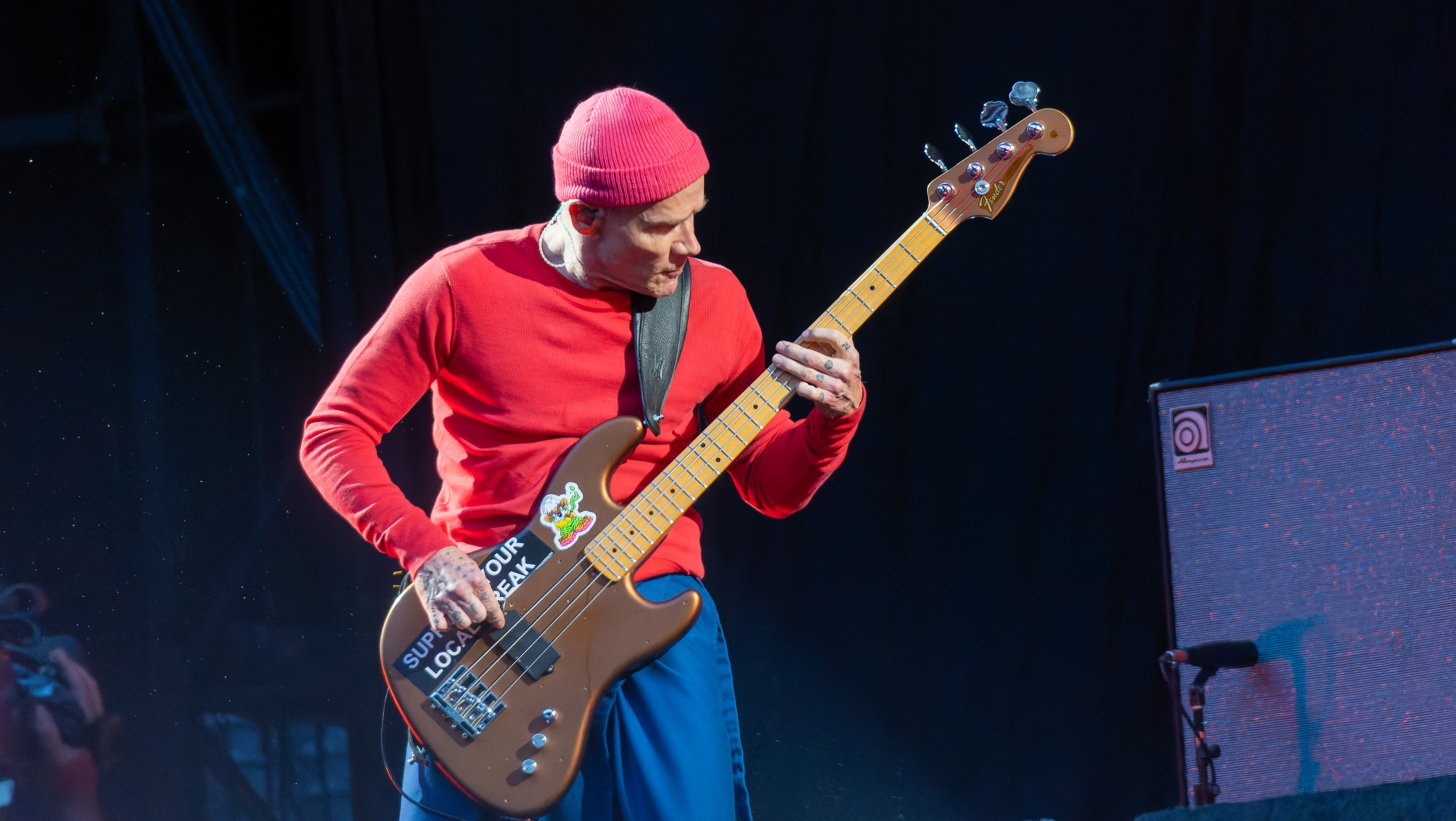
Brown

In The Getaway and 2022–2024 Global Stadium tours, Flea used four Custom Shop Fender Jazz basses.

- Silver (Sticker of the Helmets on the body)
- Road-worn Pink (in E♭ tuning for Black Summer)
- Purple (with Lakers decal on the body; in Drop D tuning for By the Way)
- Brown (with a "SUPPORT YOUR LOCAL FREAK" sticker on the body)

These basses have a Jazz Bass style body, Lane Poor Legacy pickup, 18-volt Aguilar OBP-1 preamp, and a 22-fret graphite-reinforced neck created by Fender Custom Shop master builder Jason Smith. The Brown Jazz is Fleas' current main tour bass, replacing his Modulus basses in the process.

==== Atoms for Peace basses ====
According to thekingofgear.com, Flea used the following basses in the Atoms for Peace concerts aside from his 1961 Jazz:

- Fender Precision (Sunburst)
- Hofner 500/1

=== Effects ===
Throughout his career, has Flea used these effects units:

- BOSS ODB-3 Bass Overdrive
- MXR Micro Amp
- Electro-Harmonix Q-Tron
- Dunlop 105Q Cry Baby Bass Wah
- Malekko B:assmaster
- Moog Moogerfooger MF-103 12-Stage Phaser
- Electro-Harmonix Big Muff π
- DOD FX25 Envelope Filter
- Boss GEB-7 Bass Equalizer
- Wilson Effects Freaker Wah
- Radial Engineering SGI-44
- Radial Engineering JX44

=== Amplifiers and cabinets ===
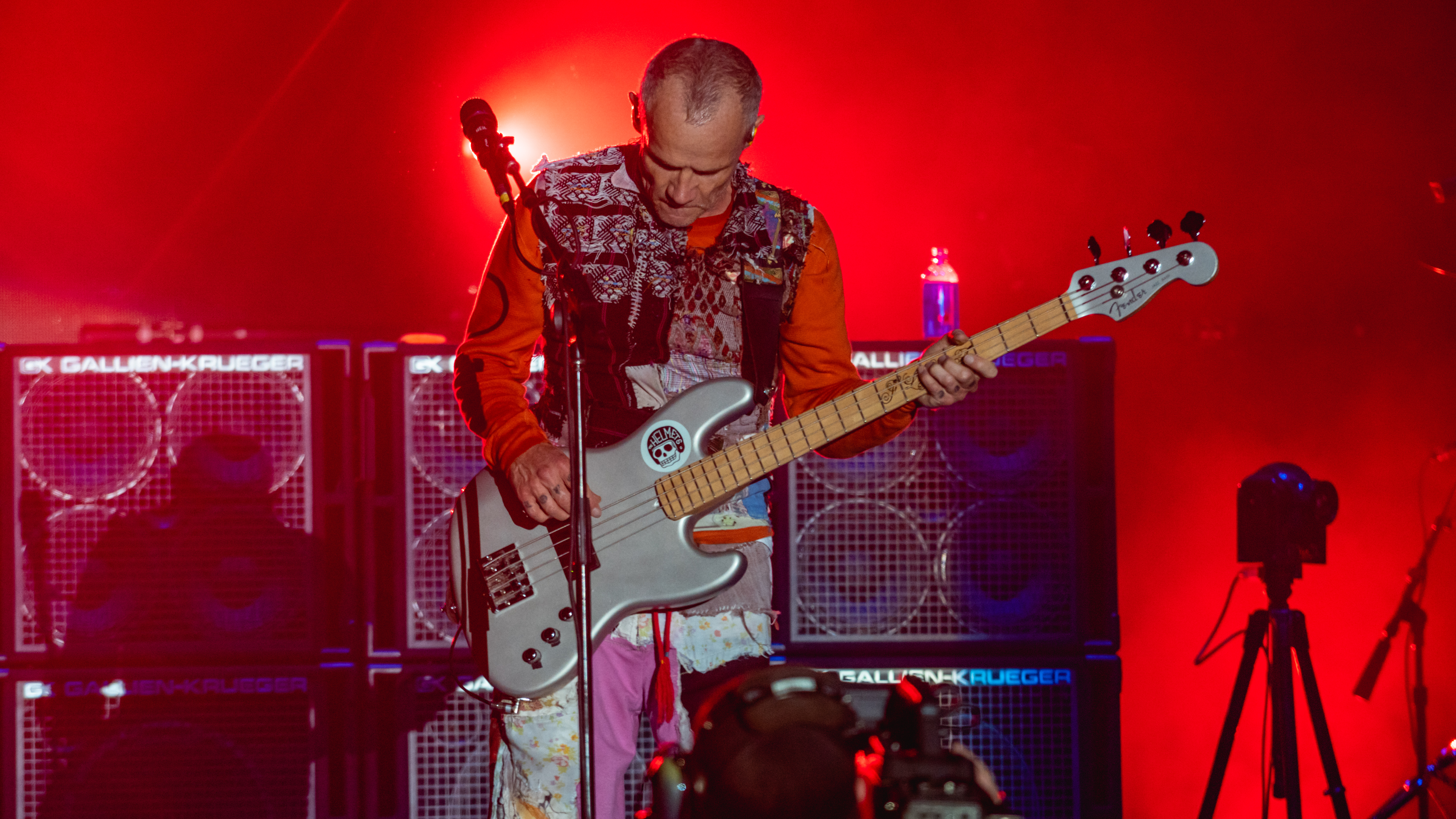
2019

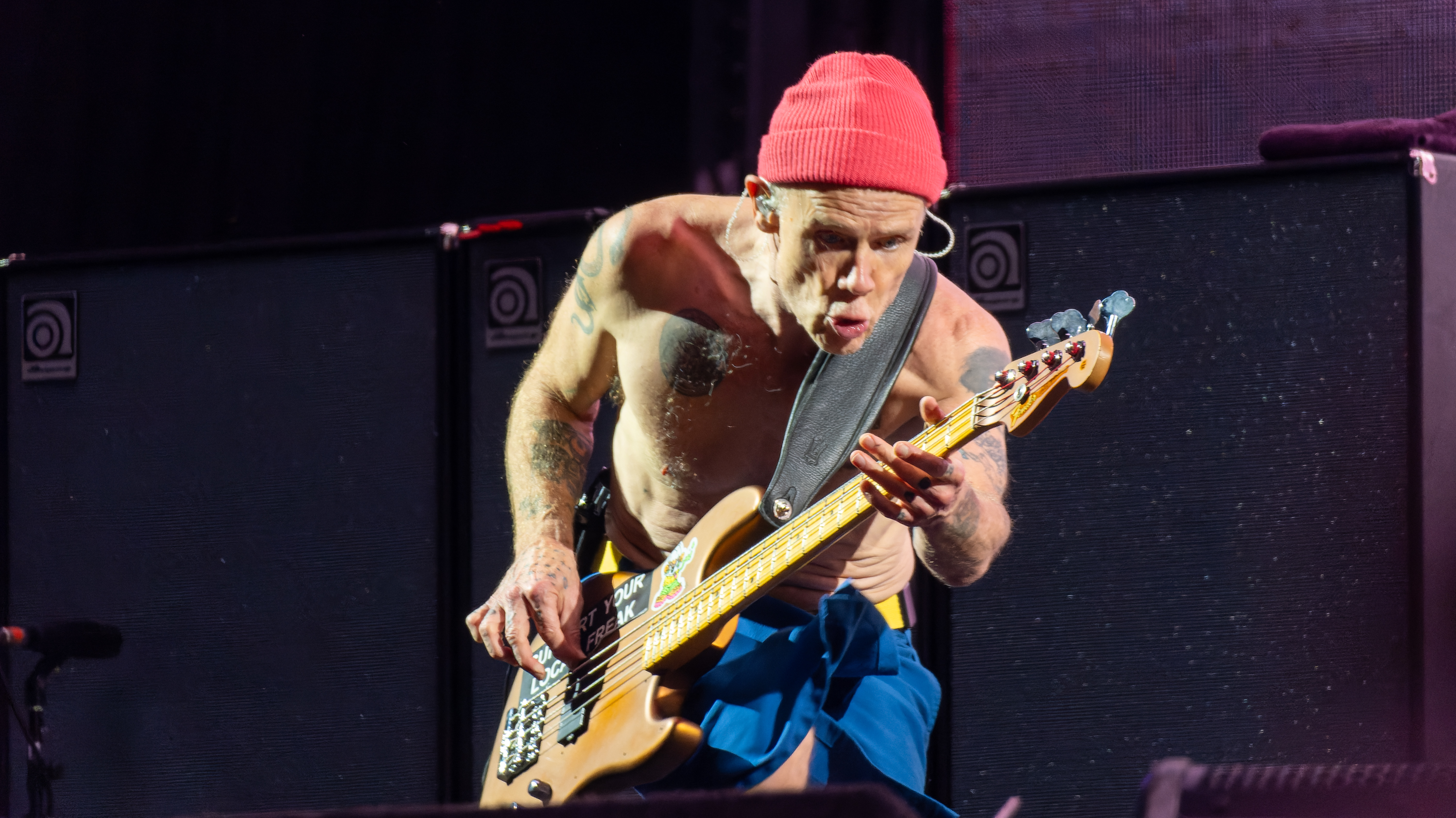
2023

According to the Flea Bass Rig (Part 2) video he used the following amps and cabs over the years in order of appearance:

==== 1983–1989 ====
- Trace Elliot AH500X
- Trace Elliot 4x10
- Ampeg VB4
- Ampeg SVT-810E
- Peavey 8x10 (unconfirmed)

==== 1989–1995 ====
- Mesa/Boogie Buster Bass 200
- Mesa/Boogie D210
- Mesa/Boogie D215
- Gallien-Krueger 800RB

==== 1995–2011, 2012–2021 ====
- Gallien-Krueger 2001RB
- Gallien-Krueger 410 RBH
- Gallien-Krueger 115 RBH

==== 2011 (I'm with You World Tour) ====
- Acoustic USA 360
- Acoustic USA 361

==== 2021–present ====
In the recording of Unlimited Love and Return of the Dream Canteen (both released in 2022), he used the following amps:

- Ampeg Portaflex
- Roland JC-120

In the 2022–2023 Global Stadium Tour, he used Ampeg SVTs.

== Musical style ==
Flea has displayed a wide variety of techniques throughout the years, ranging from his initial use of slapping and popping to the more traditional methods he has employed since Blood Sugar Sex Magik. Greg Prato of Allmusic wrote that "by combining funk-style bass with psychedelic, punk, and hard rock, Flea created an original playing style that has been copied numerous times". Flea stated in an interview, that he was influenced greatly by Louis Armstrong. Flea has been considered one of the greatest bassists of all time, with Greg Tate of Rolling Stone saying "if there were a Most Valuable Bass Player award given out in rock, Flea could have laid claim to that bitch ten years running". Smashing Pumpkins front man Billy Corgan recalls, that when he first saw the Chili Peppers in 1984, "Flea was playing so aggressively that he had worn a hole in his thumb and he was literally screaming in pain in-between songs because it hurt so bad. Someone kept coming out and pouring crazy glue into the hole." Flea's sound is also determined by what type of instrument he plays. Before Californication, he did not believe the actual bass held much significance: "what mattered was how you hit them [basses] and your emotional intent, and I still think that's the bottom line."

=== Technique ===
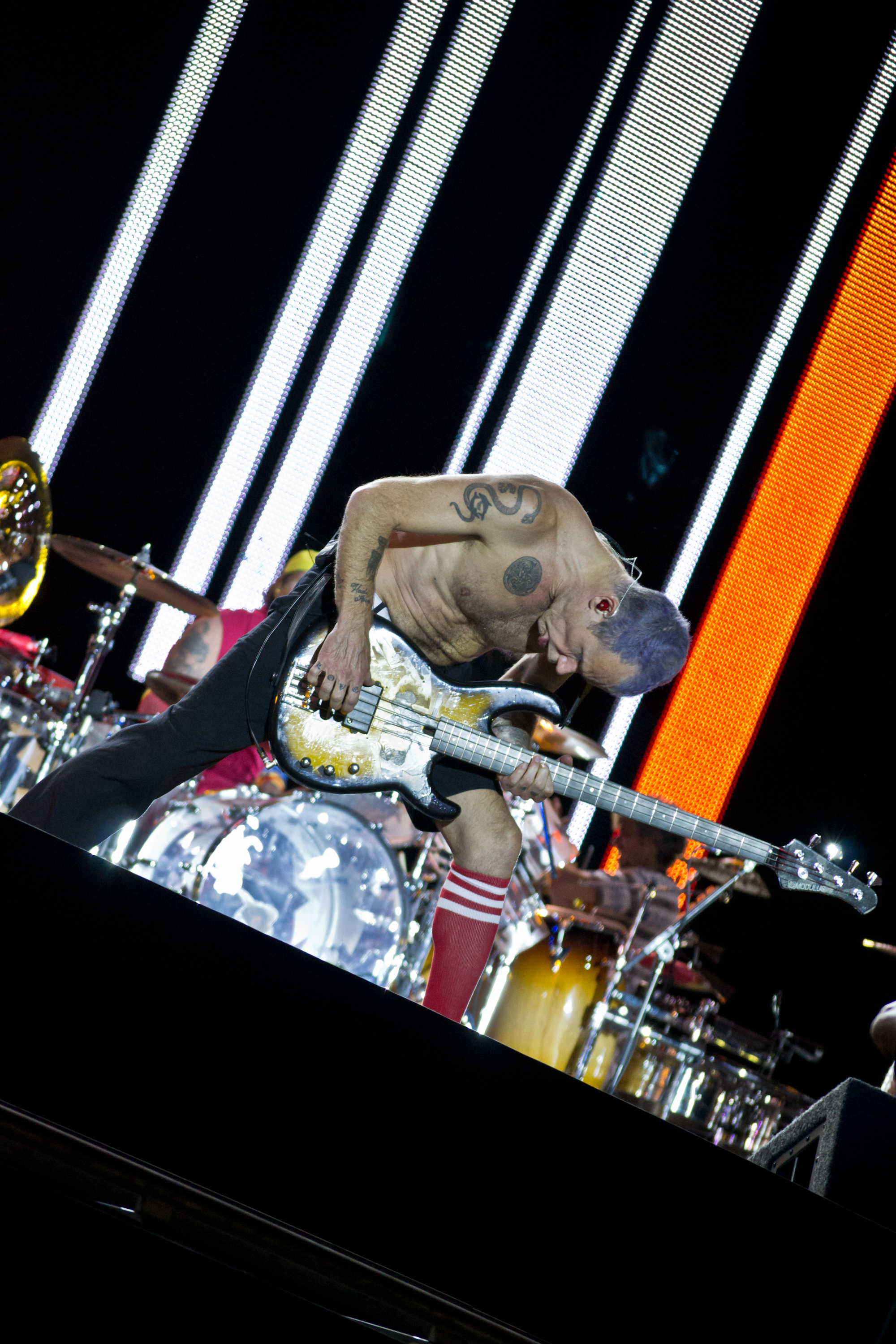
Flea performing with the Red Hot Chili Peppers at the 2012 Rock in Rio festival in Madrid

Any instrument is just a vehicle to express who you are and your relationship to the world. No matter what level you're doing it on, playing music is an opportunity to give something to the world.

— Flea, Bass Player, June 2006

Flea's bass playing has changed considerably throughout the years. When he joined Fear, his technique centered largely on punk rock bass lines; however, he was to change this style when the Red Hot Chili Peppers formed. He began to incorporate a "slap" bass style that drew influence largely from Bootsy Collins. However, this technique caused Flea to receive attention from the music world and was often copied, and he, therefore, felt it necessary to almost completely remove slap-bass styles from his repertoire following Mother's Milk (1989). Consequently, Blood Sugar Sex Magik (1991) saw a notable shift in style as it featured less of his signature technique and more styles that focused on traditional and melodic roots. His intellectual beliefs on how to play the instrument were also altered: "I was trying to play simply on Blood Sugar Sex Magik because I had been playing too much prior to that, so I thought, 'I've really got to chill out and play half as many notes'. When you play less, it's more exciting—there's more room for everything. If I do play something busy, it stands out, instead of the bass being a constant onslaught of notes. Space is good."

During the writing and recording of One Hot Minute (1995), Flea integrated some use of slap-bass progressions, but continued to apply the philosophy of "less is more" to his technique rather than courting complexity: "I can't even think of anything I played that was complex [on the record]; even the slapping stuff is simple. It's original-sounding, and I'm proud of that—but what I played was more a matter of aesthetic choice." This led Flea to alter the way he wrote music by playing alone, instead of the jam sessions that would dictate how the band conceived songs: "[One Hot Minute] is the least jam-oriented record we've made. I mean, we definitely jammed on the ideas, but there's only one groove on the whole album that came from a jam, 'Deep Kick'. The rest of it came from my sitting down with a guitar or bass."

Flea became interested in electronica during the Californication (1999) era and he attempted to emulate the same atmosphere given off by synthesizers into his bass playing: "I feel the most exciting music happening is electronica, without a doubt." He ultimately decided against this, acknowledging that, aside from Frusciante, the band was not moving in the same direction.

In By the Way (2002), many of the bass-lines were entirely stripped of funk. Flea felt the chords Frusciante had written were not supportive of his typical technique; furthermore, he does not feel the musical direction of the record was specifically melodic, but instead "... a result of each one of us being who we are. The way we [the band] compose music is a very communal thing."

=== Influences ===
Flea's stepfather was in a bebop jazz band that frequently jammed in his presence, so he soon became fascinated with the trumpet. Flea credits his continued interest in music to jazz performers like Jaco Pastorius, Miles Davis, Duke Ellington, Charlie Parker, Louis Armstrong, John Coltrane, and Dizzy Gillespie. After Kiedis introduced him to punk and rock, Flea became infatuated with artists such as Black Flag, David Bowie, and Defunkt. Flea's early influences before Blood Sugar Sex Magik were mainly funk artists. They would become a notable aspect of the Red Hot Chili Peppers' sound up to Mother's Milk. Originally, Flea was given the impression by punk bands, that one should play as hard and fast as they possibly could, but ultimately rejected this philosophy during Blood Sugar Sex Magik: "I was so into being raw [...] it was all bullshit." On Californication and By the Way, Flea drew influence from electronica, gothic rock bands like the Cure, Joy Division and Siouxsie and the Banshees and new wave music rather than funk. Flea has also spoken highly of Neil Young; he wrote an article for Rolling Stone praising Young for the consistent authenticity in his artistry, among other things.

== Legacy ==
In 2009, Rolling Stone's readers ranked Flea the second-best bassist of all time, behind John Entwistle of the Who and ahead of Paul McCartney of the Beatles. In a 2010 poll conducted on the BBC Two series I'm in a Rock 'n' Roll Band!, Flea was named the bassist in the ultimate fantasy band alongside Freddie Mercury on vocals, Jimi Hendrix on guitar and John Bonham on drums. In April 2011, Flea was voted the second-best rock bassist in a poll conducted by Contact Music, behind Entwistle and ahead of McCartney, Geddy Lee of Rush and Les Claypool of Primus. Glay bassist Jiro cited Flea as one of his biggest influences.

== Filmography ==
=== Film ===
Year	Title	Role	Notes
1983	The Outsiders	Soc #3	Uncredited
1983	Suburbia	Razzle	Credited as Mike B. The Flea
1983	Nightmares	Singer	Credited as The Flea
1986	Thrashin'	Flea	Uncredited
1986	Tough Guys	Red Hot Chili Peppers Member	
1987	Dudes	Milo	
1987	Less than Zero	Musician #1	
1987	Stranded	Jester The Alien	
1988	Let's Get Lost	Self	Documentary
1988	The Blue Iguana	Floyd	
1989	Back to the Future Part II	Douglas J. Needles	
1990	Back to the Future Part III	Douglas J. Needles	
1991	My Own Private Idaho	Budd	
1991	Motorama	Busboy	
1992	Roadside Prophets	Too Free Stooges	
1993	Son in Law	Tattoo Artist	Uncredited
1994	The Chase	Dale	
1995	Woodstock '94	Self	Documentary; credited as Red Hot Chili Peppers
1998	The Big Lebowski	Nihilist #2	
1998	Fear and Loathing in Las Vegas	Musician	
1998	Psycho	Bob Summerfield	
1998	The Decline of Western Civilization III	Self	Documentary
1998	Free Tibet	Self	Documentary; credited as Red Hot Chili Peppers
1999	Liar's Poker	Freddie	
1999	Three Days	Self	Documentary
2000	Gen¹³	Edward Chang / Grunge (voice)	
2000	Goodbye Casanova	Silent	
2002	The Wild Thornberrys Movie	Donnie Thornberry (voice)	
2002	Rising Low	Self	Documentary
2003	Rugrats Go Wild	Donnie Thornberry (voice)	
2005	We Jam Econo: The Story of the Minutemen	Self	Documentary
2006	American Hardcore	Self	Documentary; credited as Richard 'Flea' Balzari
2006	Too Tough to Die: A Tribute to Johnny Ramone	Self	Documentary
2007	Joe Strummer: The Future Is Unwritten	Self	Documentary
2008	Patti Smith: Dream of Life	Self	Documentary
2009	Life on the Road with Mr. and Mrs. Brown	Self	Documentary
2010	Everyday Sunshine: The Story of Fishbone	Self	Documentary
2010	The Making of Olympia	Self	Documentary
2011	The Other F Word	Self	Documentary
2011	Bob and the Monster	Self - Red Hot Chili Peppers	Documentary
2012	Lexicon Devil	Self	Documentary
2014	Low Down	Hobbs	
2014	Roman Holiday	Chadney and Sunny Holiday	Short Film
2014	Timebomb: Anti-Propaganda of the Artists at Elysian	Self	Short Documentary
2014	Boardwalk Hempire: The Rise and Fall of the Medical Kush Beach Club	Self (voice)	Documentary
2015	Inside Out	Mind Worker Cop Jake (voice)	
2015	Riley's First Date?	Jordan's Fear (voice)	Short film
2015	Jaco	Self	Documentary
2017	Song to Song	Flea	Credited as Michael Peter Balzary
2017	Baby Driver	Eddie	
2017	The Public Image is Rotten	Self	Documentary
2018	Boy Erased	Brandon	
2018	Queen & Slim	Mr. Shepherd	
2018	Horses: Patti Smith and Her Band	Self	Documentary
2019	Toy Story 4	Caboom TV Announcer (voice)	
2021	Arlo the Alligator Boy	Ruff (voice)	Netflix Original Movie
2021	The Sparks Brothers	Self	Documentary
2021	What Drives Us	Self	Documentary
2022	Babylon	Bob Levine	
2024	Inside Out 2	Jake (voice)	
2025	Arco	Frankie (voice)	English dub

=== Television ===
Year	Title	Role	Notes
1991	The Idiot Box	Mugger	Episode: "Episode #1.2"
1992	The Ben Stiller Show	Self	Episode: "With Flea"
1993	The Simpsons	Self (voice)	Episode: "Krusty Gets Kancelled"
1993	Rhythm & Jam	Self	Television Mini Series
1994	24 Hours in Rock and Roll	Self	Direct-to-TV documentary
1994	Hi Octane	Self	Episode: "Episode #1.3"
1994	Freaks, Nerds & Weirdos	Self	Direct-to-TV documentary
1995	The Big Breakfast	Self	Episode: "October 2, 1995"; credited as Red Hot Chili Peppers
1996	Just Your Luck	Johnny	Direct-to-TV film
1997	Duckman	Self (voice)	Episode: "A Star Is Abhorred"
1998	Gen^{13}	Grunge/Edward Chang (voice)	Television film
1998	Late Night with Conan O'Brien	Self - Guest	Episode: "Scott Wolf/Flea/Kevin Brennan"
1998	The Lionhearts	(voice)	Episode: "Singin' in the Mane"
1998	South Park (Chef: Behind the Menu)	Self	Television film
1998–2004	The Wild Thornberrys	Donnie Thornberry / Tom / Additional Voices (voice)	Main cast; 89 episodes
1999	Behind the Music	Self	2 episodes
1999	Making the Video	Self	Direct-to-TV documentary
2000	MADtv	Self	2 episodes
2001	The Wild Thornberrys: The Origin of Donnie	Donnie Thornberry (voice)	Television film
2002	Friday Night with Jonathan Ross	Self - Red Hot Chili Peppers	Episode: "Episode #2.11"
2002	The Saturday Show	Self	Episode: "Episode: #1.57"; credited as Red Hot Chili Peppers
2003	Jimmy Kimmel Live!	Self	Episode: "Episode #2.69"
2005	Independent Lens	Self	Episode: "Parliament Funkadelic: One Nation Under a Groove"
2005	All We Are Saying	Self	Direct-to-TV documentary
2006	Dancing with the Stars	Self - Red Hot Chili Peppers	Episode: "Episode #4.2"
2006	Popworld	Self	Episode: "April 22, 2006"
2006	House Band	Self	Episode: "Red Hot Chili Peppers"
2006	Saturday Night Live	Self	Episode: "Tom Hanks/Red Hot Chili Peppers"
2006	My Shot With	Self	Episode: "The Virgin Music Festival"
2006	Musikprogrammet - programmet om musik	Self - Red Hot Chili Peppers	Direct-to-TV documentary
2007	4Real	Self	Episode: "4Real Haiti"
2009	P.O.V.	Self	Episode: "Patti Smith: Dream of Life"
2011	The Jonathan Ross Show	Self	Episode: "Benedict Cumberbatch, The Saturdays, Alan Carr and Red Hot Chili Peppers"; credited as Red Hot Chili Peppers
2013	The Gorburger Show	Self	Episode: "Flea"
2013	The Art of Punk	Self	Episode: "Black Flag"
2013	The Daily Show	Self	Episode: "Atoms for Peace"
2014	Stan Lee's Mighty 7	Roller Man (voice)	Television film
2014	Access Sportsnet: Los Angeles	Self	Episode: "April 13, 2014"
2014	Larry King Now	Self - Guest	Episode: "Flea"
2014–2016	Sheriff Callie's Wild West	The Milk Bandit (voice)	4 episodes
2015	Highston	Self	Episode: "Pilot"
2015	American Dad!	Orderly (voice)	Episode: "Stan-Dan Deliver"
2015	Feedback Kitchen with Mario Batali	Self	Episode: "Flea"
2015	Le grand journal de Canal+	Self	Episode: "December 3, 2015"
2016	La Viola	Self	Episode: "July 2, 2016"
2016	Kulturjournal	Self	Episode: "November 14, 2016"
2016	The Late Late Show with James Corden	Self - Carpool Karaoke	2 episodes
2017	All or Nothing: A Season with the Los Angeles Rams	Self	Amazon Prime Original Documentary
2017	Family Guy	Self (voice)	Episode: "Peter's Def Jam"
2019	Punk	Self	3 episodes
2019	Shangri-La	Self	2 episodes
2019	CBS Saturday Morning	Self - Guest	Episode: "November 2, 2019"
2021	I Heart Arlo	Ruff (voice)	3 episodes
2022	Obi-Wan Kenobi	Vect Nokru	Miniseries, 2 episodes
2023	Painting with John	Self	Episode "My Friend Flea"
2024	Transformers: EarthSpark	Aftermath (voice)	6 episodes
2024	John Mulaney Presents: Everybody's in LA	Self	TBA, six-part John Mulaney Netflix live streamed comedy special
2024	Yo Gabba Gabbaland!	Self	Episode: Water

=== Video games ===
Year	Title	Role	Notes
2000	The Wild Thornberrys: Animal Adventures	Donnie Thornberry	
2000	The Wild Thornberrys: Rambler	Donnie Thornberry	
2002	The Wild Thornberrys Movie	Donnie Thornberry	Based on the film of the same name

=== Non-Red Hot Chili Peppers music videos ===
Year	Title	Role	Artist	Notes
1985	"Sex Machine"	Self	James Brown	
1986	"Pizza Face"	Pizza delivery man	Barnes & Barnes	
1986	"(You Gotta) Fight for Your Right (to Party!)"	Self	Beastie Boys	
1989	"Bust a Move"	Self	Young MC	Uncredited
1991	"Give Peace A Chance"	Self	The Peace Choir	
1993	"Who Was in My Room Last Night?"	Bartender	Butthole Surfers	
1997	"Jane Says"	Self	Jane's Addiction	
2000	"Break Stuff"	Self	Limp Bizkit	
2006	"God's Gonna Cut You Down"	Self	Johnny Cash	Uncredited
2014	"Ugly Boy"	Self	Die Antwoord	
2025	"A Plea"	Self	Flea	Music video directed by his daughter Clara Balzary for his debut single from his 2026 solo album Honora
2026	"Traffic Lights" (feat. Thom Yorke)	Animated video	Flea	Second single from Honora directed by nespy5euro

== Discography ==
=== Solo ===
- "I've Been Down", released on the soundtrack for the movie The Basketball Diaries (1995)
- "Media Blitz", released on the Germs tribute album A Small Circle of Friends (1996)
- Helen Burns EP (2012)
- Honora (2026)

=== Rocket Juice & the Moon ===
- Rocket Juice & the Moon (2008)

=== Atoms for Peace ===
- Amok (2013)

=== Collaborations ===
with Jane's / RHCP

- "Idiots Rule" w/ Angelo Moore & Christopher Dowd (1988) - Jane's Addiction
- "What'll I Do (Remix)" w/ Dave Navarro & Chad Smith (1995) - Janet Jackson
- "You Oughta Know" w/ Dave Navarro (1995) - Alanis Morissette
- "E-Ticket Ride" & "Sidemouse Advice" w/ Mike D & Stephen Perkins (1995) - Mike Watt
- "Freeway" w/ Dave Navarro (1996) - Porno for Pyros
- "Hard Charger" w/ Dave Navarro (1997) - Porno for Pyros
- "I Make My Own Rules" w/ Dave Navarro & Chad Smith (1997) - LL Cool J
- "Kettle Whistle", "So What!" & "Slow Divers" (1997) - Jane's Addiction
- "Grease the System" w/ John Frusciante (1999) - Stephen Perkins' Banyan
- "#1 Da Woman" w/ John Frusciante (2001) - Tricky
- "Heart of Gold" w/ John Frusciante & Chad Smith (2003) - Johnny Cash
- "Hard Life Easy" w/ John Frusciante & "Milky Ave" w/ Jack Irons (2007) - Perry Farrell's Satellite Party
- "Song in the Silence (The Man Who Can Fly Pt. 7)" w/ Willie Waldman (2008) - Eric Avery
- The Empyrean w/ Josh Klinghoffer, 6 tracks (2009) - John Frusciante
- "Was Never There" (2019) & "Nowhere I Am" [B-side] w/ Jack Irons (2020) - Pluralone
- "Not Great Men" (2021) Gang of Four cover w/ John Frusciante & The Silverlake Conservatory Youth Chorale [1st recording w/ JF since 2008]
- Bonfire of Teenagers w/ Josh Klinghoffer & Chad Smith [unreleased] - Morrissey

with Omar & Cedric

- De-Loused in the Comatorium (2003) most tracks - The Mars Volta
- "The Widow" & "Miranda that Ghost Just Isn't Holy Anymore" (2005) - The Mars Volta
- Antemasque (2014) - ANTEMASQUE

Other appearances

- "Leave My Monkey Alone" w/ DeWayne "Blackbyrd" McKnight (1987) - Warren Zevon
- "Bust a Move" & "I Come Off" (1989) - Young MC
- "Sleepin' wit My Fonk" (1994) - Sir Mix-A-Lot
- "Note to a Friend" from In Defense Of Animals: Volume II (1996) - Aleka's Attic
- "Spiritual" Spain cover w/ Curt Bisquera (1996) - Johnny Cash
- "Ill Wind" w/ James Pinker Pinkerelly, Jimmy Scott, & Michael Stipe (1997) - Michael Brook
- "War" w/ Henry Rollins & Tom Morello (1998) - Bone Thugs-n-Harmony
- "Barcelona" (1998) - Jewel
- "It's A Rockin' World" w/ Tom Morello, Benmont Tench, D.J. Bonebrake, & Nick Hexum (1998) - Joe Strummer
- "Down and Out in New York City" James Brown cover w/ Keith "Tree" Barry (2001) - Gov't Mule
- "Narcissus" (2002) - Alanis Morissette
- "3rd Movement of The Odyssey" (2004) - Halo 2 Original Soundtrack - Incubus
- Concert Series Volume 1 (2004) select tracks - Axis of Justice
- Momentum, 3 tracks (2005) - Joshua Redman
- Wednesday: Modern Folk and Blues (2006) unspecified tracks - Bob Forrest
- "Gimme Shelter" & "White Rabbit" w/ Tom Verlaine (2007) - Patti Smith
- "Bleed for Something Beautiful" (2008) - Keith Caputo
- "Baby Can't Drive" w/ Alice Cooper, Nicole Scherzinger & Steven Adler (2010) - Slash
- "Help Me, Rhonda" w/ Steve Miller (2010) - Al Jardine
- "Raised Right Men" & "Hell Broke Luce" (2011) - Tom Waits
- "My Plane Leaves Tomorrow (Au Revoir)" w/ Neil Young (2025) - Al Jardine

=== Producer ===
- "Walk On Water" from The Boldness of Style (1987) - Thelonious Monster
