= Melody Ehsani =

American-Iranian fashion designer

- Born: March 27, 1980 (age 46); Los Angeles, California, United States
- Occupation: Fashion designer
- Spouse: Flea (m. 2019)

Melody Ehsani (born March 27, 1980) is an American fashion designer based in Los Angeles. She is Foot Locker's first women's creative director and has collaborated with the likes of Nike and Reebok.

== Career ==
Melody Ehsani was born in Los Angeles to Iranian parents. After leaving law school, Ehsani launched her own signature brand in 2007 that specializes in throwback apparel and jewelry. In March 2021, Foot Locker named Ehsani its first women's creative director. She has collaborated with Nike Air Jordan, Reebok, and celebrity clients such as Serena Williams, Beyoncé, Yara Shahidi, and Snoh Aalegra.

In 2022, Ehsani designed the new clothing and merchandise for the Red Hot Chili Peppers to promote their album, Unlimited Love, and its supporting world tour.

== Personal life ==
In October 2019, Ehsani married Red Hot Chili Peppers bassist Flea. On July 31, 2022, Melody announced via her Instagram that she was pregnant. Flea confirmed that Ehsani gave birth to their child on December 12, 2022.
