= Acid for the Children =

2019 memoir of Red Hot Chili Peppers bassist Flea

- First edition cover
- Author: Flea
- Audio read by: Flea
- Cover artist: Elaine Berkovitz Cunningham (photo); Albert Tang (design)
- Language: English
- Genre: Memoir
- Publisher: Grand Central Publishing
- Publication date: November 5, 2019
- Publication place: United States
- Media type: Print (Hardcover); Audiobook; E-book
- Pages: 400
- ISBN: 978-1-4555-3053-3
- Dewey Decimal: 787.87/166092 B
- LC Class: ML419.F59 A3 2019

Acid for the Children is the memoir of Red Hot Chili Peppers bassist Flea. It was released on November 5, 2019, by Grand Central Publishing, accompanied by audiobook and E-book versions.

== Background ==
In April 2014, Flea started writing his memoir. The book was expected to chronicle Flea's unconventional childhood (including his move from a "normal" life in the New York suburbs to a "bohemian" lifestyle in Los Angeles with his jazz-playing stepfather), his adventures in the L.A. streets, his "sometimes complex friendship and collaboration" with Chili Peppers co-founder Anthony Kiedis and the overall "tumultuous creative journey" of the band, which formed in 1982.

In 2018, Flea confirmed that the book would not detail his years with the Red Hot Chili Peppers and would instead focus on his life before the band. "It's my great hope that it could be a book that could live beyond being a celebrity book or a rock star book and just stand on its own as a piece of literature," Flea says of Acid for the Children, which he described as an origin story: "It ends where The Red Hot Chili Peppers begins."
