= Ada Leonard =

American bandleader (1915–1997)

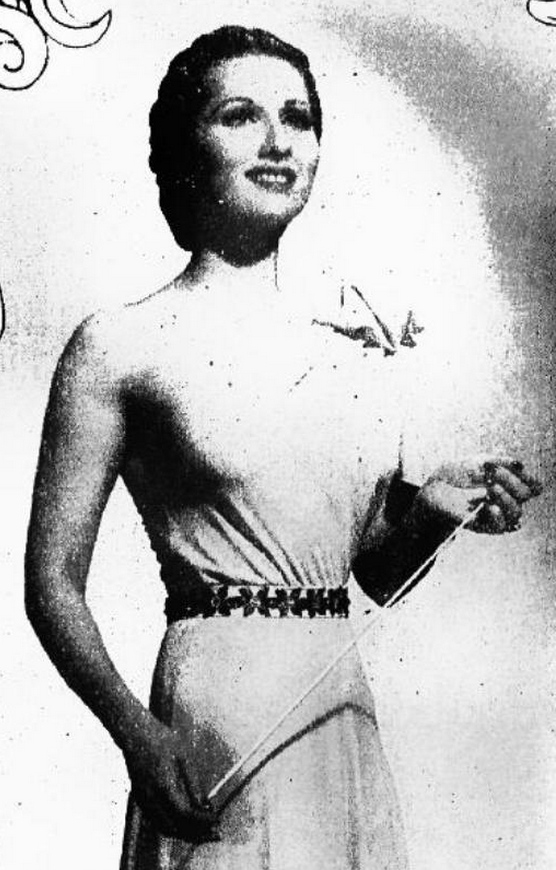

Background information
- Born: July 22, 1915; Lawton, Oklahoma, U.S.
- Died: November 29, 1997 (aged 82); Santa Monica, California, U.S.
- Genres: jazz, swing
- Occupation(s): Musician, vaudeville stripper
- Years active: 1937–1954

Ada Leonard (July 22, 1915 – November 29, 1997) was an American bandleader.

She was the leader of the All-American Girl Orchestra, the first all-female band to tour with the USO during World War II. The big-band leader was a performer with a background in musical performance.

== Early life ==
Leonard was born in Lawton, Oklahoma, on July 22, 1915. Her father was an actor, and her mother a dancer who also played several different musical instruments. Leonard debuted on stage at age 2, singing and dancing in her parents vaudeville act. Later she was billed as Baby Ada. When she was 17, she went to Chicago and began performing in burlesque. She also sang in night clubs in Chicago.

== Musical career ==
While Leonard played the cello and the piano, she did not play either instrument professionally.

The Ada Leonard Orchestra was the first all-female band officially signed by the USO, and it performed at army camps throughout the United States during World War II. From 1952 to 1954, Leonard hosted a variety show on television; Search for Girls, starring Leonard and her orchestra, ran on KTTV in Los Angeles for 30 minutes on Friday nights. She subsequently went on to realize her ambition of leading an all-male big band.

== Film ==
Leonard portrayed Princess Zarina, a fan dancer, in the film Meet the Missus (1937). She and her orchestra performed in the film My Dream Is Yours (1949).

== Personal life ==
Leonard was married, and widowed, twice: first to George L. McCall, who had managed her career; and, subsequently, Dr. Harold Bernstein, one of the founders of the Reiss-Davis Clinic.

== Death ==
Leonard died in Santa Monica, California on November 27, 1997, at the age of 82.
