= A Plea =

Single by Flea

from the album Honora
- Released: December 2, 2025
- Length: 7:39
- Label: Nonesuch
- Songwriter: Flea
- Producer: Josh Johnson

Flea singles chronology
"A Plea" (2025)	"Traffic Lights" (2026)

Music video
- "A Plea" on YouTube

"A Plea" is the debut solo single by the Red Hot Chili Peppers bassist Flea, released on December 2, 2025, by Nonesuch Records. It is the first single from his debut solo album Honora, released on March 27, 2026.

== Background, composition and lyrics ==
Flea wrote "A Plea" in an urge for listeners to "build a bridge, shine a light, make something beautiful and see somebody, give it to somebody. I don’t care about the act of politics. I think there is a much more transcendent place above it where there’s discourse to be had that can actually help humanity, and actually help us all to live harmoniously and productively in a way that’s healthy for the world. There’s a place where we meet, and it’s love." Flea said the song is about "yearning for a place beyond, a place of love, for me to speak my mind and be myself. I’m always just trying to be myself."

== Release and reception ==
"A Plea" was released on December 2, 2025, by Nonesuch Records, and was well received by critics, with Tom Breihan of Stereogum calling the single a "striking, vivid, memorable track" Rolling Stone said Flea worked with a "dream band of modern jazz visionaries" on the track. MusicRadar critic Will Simpson said one "[shouldn't] expect it to get heavy radio rotation though. It’s a seven-minute track, with plenty of bass".

== Music video ==
A music video for the song premiered on December 2, 2025, and consists of Flea performing interpretive dance. The video was produced by Flea's daughter Clara Balzary, with choreography by Sadie Wilkins.

== Credits and personnel ==
According to Stereogum and Apple Music:

Performers

- Flea – electric bass guitar, lead vocals, trumpet, songwriter
- Rickey Washington – alto flute
- Josh Johnson – alto saxophone, backing vocals, producer
- Deantoni Parks – drums, backing vocals
- Jeff Parker – guitar, backing vocals
- Mauro Refosco – percussion
- Vikram Devasthali – trombone
- Anna Butterss – double bass, backing vocals
- Chris Warren – backing vocals

Production

- Eric Boulanger – mastering engineer
- Ryan Hewitt – mixing engineer
- Clint Welander – recording engineer
