= Traffic Lights (Flea song) =

Single by Flea featuring Thom Yorke

from the album Honora
- Released: January 14, 2026
- Genre: Jazz
- Length: 5:41
- Label: Nonesuch
- Songwriters: Flea; Josh Johnson; Thom Yorke
- Producer: Josh Johnson

Flea singles chronology
"A Plea" (2025)	"Traffic Lights" (2026)	"Thinkin Bout You" (2026)

Thom Yorke singles chronology
"Dialing In" (2025)	"Traffic Lights" (2026)

Official visualizer
- "Traffic Lights" (feat. Thom Yorke) on YouTube

"Traffic Lights" is a song by the American bassist Flea, released as the second single from his debut solo album, Honora, on January 14, 2026, by Nonesuch Records. It features the Radiohead singer Thom Yorke.

== Writing ==
Flea wrote "Traffic Lights" with Josh Johnson and Thom Yorke. Flea said he invited Yorke to collaborate as it reminded him of their work in the band Atoms for Peace. Flea said: "I thought it would be a rhythm and a sensibility that he would relate to ... He's just the warmest, free flowing, jamming motherfucker." Flea interpreted Yorke's lyrics, with references to living in the "upside down", as an attempt to "make sense of things when we're getting all this fake shit and real shit". The Atoms for Peace member Mauro Refosco also contributed percussion.

== Release ==
"Traffic Lights" was released as the second single from Flea's debut solo album, Honora, on January 14, 2026. The Stereogum critic Tom Breihan wrote: "It's got Yorke's inimitable voice floating over a busy, lively, percussive jazz landscape, and it sounds really cool." Trey Alston described it as a "smooth, mid-tempo groove that wouldn't sound out of place on an episode of Hey Arnold! With its trumpets and soft drums, a marriage of Yorke's soothing voice and hand claps in the background."

== Personnel ==
According to Honora's liner notes.

- Flea – electric bass, trumpet
- Thom Yorke – vocals, piano, synth
- Deantoni Parks – drums
- Jeff Parker – guitar
- Nathaniel Walcott – Rhodes piano
- Mauro Refosco – percussion
- Josh Johnson – alto saxophone
