= A Raw Youth =

Studio album by Le Butcherettes
- Released: September 18, 2015
- Recorded: 2015
- Genre: Punk rock, indie rock
- Length: 41:18
- Label: Rodriguez Lopez Productions, Ipecac
- Producer: Omar Rodríguez-López

Le Butcherettes chronology
Cry Is for the Flies (2014)	A Raw Youth (2015)	bi/MENTAL (2019)

Singles from A Raw Youth
- 1. "Shave the Pride" Released: October 30, 2015

A Raw Youth is the third album by Mexican band Le Butcherettes, released on September 18, 2015 via Ipecac Recordings

== Lyrics and themes ==
The album examines themes of personal and social oppression.

"Shave the Pride" originated as a diatribe against Gender Bender's bearded lover hiding behind "masses of hair". After rewrites, the song's "outrage and frustration" became directed against society's "unwillingess to view all perceptions of [a] story... hiding behind the mass media."

"La Uva” uses a symbol of a grape to represent "a fragile being that can be stepped on. But, the ink from its body stains and is seen by other people." It was originally recorded by Bosnian Rainbows, but remained unreleased. The studio version by Le Butcherettes samples the Bosnian Rainbows version.

"Sold Less Than Gold" was partially inspired by Gender Bender's trip to Iran. According to her, "the song was written with women from the Middle East in mind - women that were being sold from their family to strangers. Being raped and mutilated." It's about "women (...) sold into marriages or into sex slavery and how resilient their spirits are.”

"The Hitch Hiker" plays out a call-and-response between a hitchhiker and the man who picks her up. The situation escalates into kidnapping and murder.

"My Half" deals with "finding closure with the loss of an unjust death."

== Reception ==
Professional ratings
Aggregate scores
Source	Rating
Metacritic	79/100
Review scores
Source	Rating
AllMusic	4/5 stars
Consequence of Sound	B−

A Raw Youth received generally favorable reviews.

Consequence of Sound's Karen Gwee wrote that the album "marks Le Butcherettes’ triumphant entrance to the mainstream rock arena, accomplished with no compromise to their identity."

== Track listing ==
All music and lyrics written by Teri Gender Bender.

No.	Title	Length
1.	"Shave the Pride"	2:37
2.	"My Mallely"	3:37
3.	"Reason to Die Young"	3:41
4.	"La Uva" (feat. Iggy Pop)	3:34
5.	"Sold Less Than Gold"	2:01
6.	"Stab My Back"	4:09
7.	"They Fuck You Over"	2:19
8.	"Witchless C Spot"	3:58
9.	"The Hitch Hiker"	2:48
10.	"Lonely & Drunk"	3:44
11.	"Oil the Shoe If the Critter Knew Any Better"	4:11
12.	"My Half" (feat. John Frusciante)	4:39
Total length:		41:18

== Personnel ==
Le Butcherettes

- Teri Gender Bender - vocals, guitar, keyboards
- Chris Common - drums
- Jamie Aaron Aux - bass

Additional musicians

- Iggy Pop - guest vocals on "La Uva"
- John Frusciante - guitar & synth bass on "My Half"
- Deantoni Parks - verse drums on "La Uva"
- Marcel Rodríguez-López - percussion & bass (Moog) synth on "Stab My Back" and "Lonely & Drunk"

Production

- Omar Rodríguez-López - producer
- Jon DeBaun, Joe Galdo & Hart Gunter - engineering
- Chris Common - engineering, mixing and mastering
- Mackie Osborne - design and layout
