= Bosnian Rainbows (album) =

Studio album by Bosnian Rainbows
- Released: June 24, 2013
- Recorded: October 2012
- Genres: Alternative rock, art rock
- Length: 48:34
- Labels: Clouds Hill (Europe/UK); Sargent House/Rodriguez Lopez Productions
- Producer: Johann Scheerer

Bosnian Rainbows chronology
Live At Clouds Hill (2012)	Bosnian Rainbows (2013)

Omar Rodríguez-López chronology
¿Sólo Extraño? (2013)	Bosnian Rainbows (2013)	Antemasque (2014)

Singles from Bosnian Rainbows
- 1. "Torn Maps" Released: January 23, 2013; 2. "Turtle Neck" Released: February 11, 2013; 3. "Morning Sickness" Released: June 10, 2013

Professional ratings
Review scores
Source	Rating
Allmusic	4/5 stars
Antiquiet	4/5 stars
Consequence of Sound	3.5/5 stars
MOJO	4/5 stars
NME	8/10 stars
Paste	(7.3/10)
Rolling Stone	2.5/5 stars

Bosnian Rainbows is the only studio album by American alternative rock band Bosnian Rainbows, released on June 24, 2013 on Clouds Hill, Sargent House and Rodriguez-Lopez Productions. Recorded and produced by Johann Scheerer, the album was recorded at Clouds Hill Studios in Hamburg, Germany in October 2012, during a break in band's touring schedule.

Bosnian Rainbows debuted at #2 on Billboard Top Heatseekers chart.

== Production ==
Bosnian Rainbows was produced on analog gear, without the use of computers.

== Critical reception ==
Reviews were generally positive; Rolling Stone said the album was impressive as an "art rock abnegation" but said they were left wanting more "excess" after Lopez's restrained New Wave style riffs on tracks like "Morning Sickness". NPR called every song on the album "catchy and anthemic" with a "cryptic" lyrical style compared to Tori Amos. Combining upbeat melodies with "hints of melancholy", Teri Gender Bender's vocals have been compared to David Bowie.

== Release ==
The album's first single, "Torn Maps", was digitally released on January 25, 2013. The second single, "Turtle Neck" followed on February 11, 2013.

== Track listing ==
All lyrics are written by Teresa Suárez; all music is composed by Bosnian Rainbows.

No.	Title	Length
1.	"Eli"	5:23
2.	"Worthless"	3:28
3.	"Dig Right in Me"	3:13
4.	"The Eye Fell in Love"	4:17
5.	"I Cry for You"	4:03
6.	"Morning Sickness"	4:00
7.	"Torn Maps"	4:03
8.	"Turtle Neck"	6:23
9.	"Always on the Run"	2:19
10.	"Red"	4:32
11.	"Mother, Father, Set Us Free"	6:53

Amazon digital download bonus track (Europe only)
No.	Title	Length
12.	"Dig Right in Me" (live)	3:39

iTunes Germany bonus track
No.	Title	Length
12.	"Turtle Neck" (live)	9:02

- Clouds Hill Special Edition also features Bosnian Rainbows Live at Clouds Hill 10" vinyl

== Personnel ==
Bosnian Rainbows

- Omar Rodríguez-López – guitar, keyboards, backing vocals
- Teri Gender Bender – vocals
- Deantoni Parks – drums, keyboards, samples
- Nicci Kasper – keyboards, synths

Recording personnel

- Johann Scheerer – producer, recording engineer
- Matt Bittman – mixing and mastering engineer

Artwork

- Sonny Kay – album art, layout
