= Bruno Levy =

Bruno Lévy
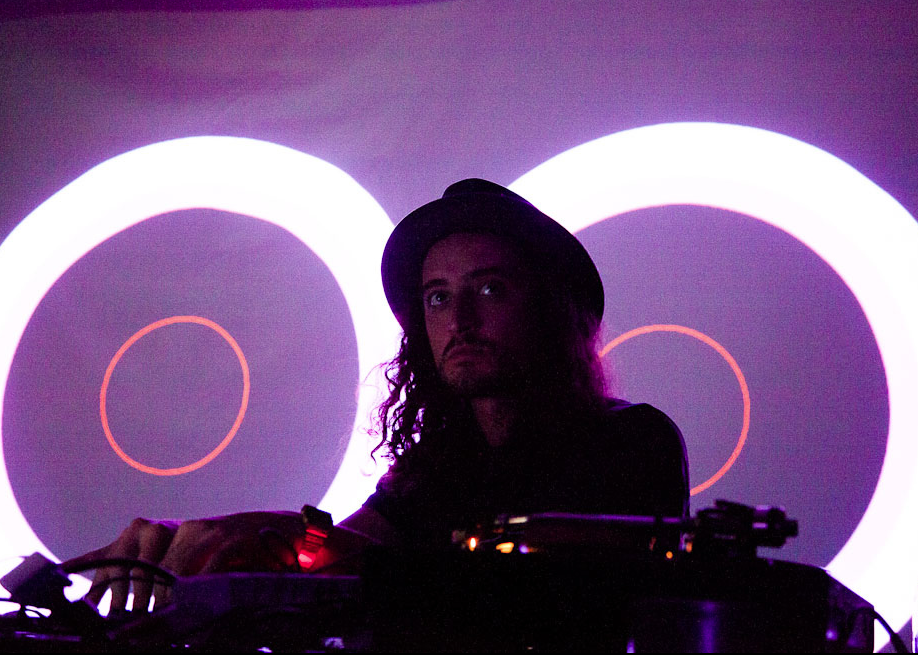
- Bruno Levy DJing in 2005
- Born: 3 August 1979 (age 47); Paris, France
- Occupation: artist
- Awards: Vimeo Festival Award; 2013 SWEATSHOPPE Video Painting Europe – Director
- Website: brunolevy.com

Bruno Lévy (born 3 August 1979) is a French artist living in New York City. His artwork deals primarily with creating dynamic relationships between audio and video. He is best known for creating interactive video paintings and 3D video installations, as part of the new media collective SWEATSHOPPE, which he co-founded in 2009 with Blake Shaw. He has shot and directed music videos for bands such as The Walkmen and Modeselektor. In 2007, Bruno Levy shifted his focus to tattooing.

== Early life ==
Levy was born on 3 August 1979 in Paris, France. He graduated from New York University in 2001 with a degree in photography.

== Work ==
He began experimenting with manipulating video in real-time shortly after graduating, under the acronym SQUARESQUARE. His video scratching and live video manipulation performances received attention and acclaim from the likes of Apple and Wired Magazine. In 2009 he co-founded the new media collective SWEATSHOPPE, which is known for cutting edge video technology and 3D interactive art. SWEATSHOPPE has received multiple awards for their work, including a Vimeo Award in 2012 for their Video Painting in Europe. Levy has also worked professionally as a filmmaker and photographer, directing music videos for bands such as The Walkmen and Modeselektor.

Levy's personal artwork can be described as highly psychedelic. In 2010, New York Times journalist Dennis Overbye wrote an article titled "For 3-D Travelers, a Cosmic Journey" about an immersive 3D environment created by Levy and Shaw, explaining: "[it] left me feeling transported back to 1969, when animated discussions of issues of cosmic import could go on all night on similarly unadorned floors, under the influence of slightly different stimulation".

In 2013 he founded the online publication Dispose, a project based on distributing disposable cameras to selected individuals around the world. Contributors, ranging from Artists to Orphans, capture all 27 exposures in a 24-hour period.

As of April 2014 he performs with drummer Deantoni Parks in their collaborative project World's End.

Bruno Levy learned to tattoo in Nepal in 2007 under the tutelage of Mohan Gurung. After a year of tattooing, Bruno Levy followed other artistic endeavors, predominantly working on interactive performance and installation. In 2015, Bruno started tattooing again creating simple elegant tattoos that evoke a sense of nostalgia for a more romantic time.

Bruno owns and works out of Bandit, a tattoo and art studio in Brooklyn N.Y.
