= Hamburg Demonstrations =

Studio album by Pete Doherty
- Released: December 2, 2016
- Studio: Clouds Hill Recordings (Hamburg, Germany)
- Genre: Indie rock
- Length: 39:30
- Label: Clouds Hill; BMG
- Producer: Johann Scheerer

Pete Doherty chronology
Grace/Wastelands (2009)	Hamburg Demonstrations (2016)	Peter Doherty & The Puta Madres (2019)

Singles from Hamburg Demonstrations
- 1. "Flags of the Old Regime" Released: March 9, 2015; 2. "The Whole World Is Our Playground" Released: 2016; 3. "I Don't Love Anyone (But You're Not Just Anyone)" Released: 2016; 4. "Kolly Kibber" Released: 2016

Hamburg Demonstrations is the second solo studio album by English musician Pete Doherty. It was released on 2 December 2016 via Clouds Hill Records and BMG Rights Management. Recording sessions took place at Clouds Hill Recordings in Hamburg. Production was handled by Johann Scheerer.

== Critical reception ==
Professional ratings
Aggregate scores
Source	Rating
AnyDecentMusic?	6.2/10
Metacritic	67/100
Review scores
Source	Rating
AllMusic	3.5/5 stars
Classic Rock	3.5/5 stars
Consequence of Sound	D+
musicOMH	3.5/5 stars
NME	4/5 stars
PopMatters	5/10
The A.V. Club	C+
The Guardian	3/5 stars
The Observer	3/5 stars
Under the Radar	3/10 stars

Hamburg Demonstrations was met with generally favourable reviews from music critics. At Metacritic, which assigns a normalized rating out of 100 to reviews from mainstream publications, the album received an average score of 67 based on twenty reviews. The aggregator AnyDecentMusic? has the critical consensus of the album at a 6.2 out of 10, based on twenty-two reviews.

Barry Nicolson of NME praised the album, declaring: "it sounds like a long-overdue coming-of-age. It's never been easy being a fan of Doherty, but it's certainly getting more rewarding". AllMusic's Heather Phares stated: "Doherty's solo career has resulted in some of his most rewarding music even if it's not the most attention-getting, and fans who have stuck with him this long will find a lot to enjoy on Hamburg Demonstrations". Terry Staunton of Classic Rock noted: "the skeletal arrangements allow the controlled frailty of Doherty's voice to pack a stronger emotional punch". Andy Baber of musicOMH proclaimed: "there is nothing here that is dramatically different to what he offered on his debut solo album, but the end result is charming and beautifully comforting nonetheless".

In mixed reviews, Tim Jonze of The Guardian resumed: "The Kinks-esque melodies are surprisingly tuneful and, during its hushed moments, Doherty proves himself a deft master of late-night intimacy". Phil Mongredien of The Observer wrote: "it's not without its longueurs--"Oily Boker" is an unremarkable five minutes--but at least Doherty can once again show why anybody was bothered about him in the first place". Randall Colburn of The A.V. Club concluded: "there is the sense here that he's trying to get away from himself, to grasp at problems that loom larger than those in his personal life. It feels necessary, if not particularly memorable". Pryor Stroud of PopMatters expressed: "Hamburg Demonstrations, for all its charm and cheeky wordplay and get-the-bar-to-its-feet swagger, doesn't quite live up to the expectations that its forbear set for it. Nevertheless, this is millennial Brit-rock through and through".

In negative reviews, Scott Heisel of Consequence stated: "the album falls flat in just about every aspect. It's not offensively bad, it's inoffensively boring". Lily Moayeri of Under the Radar penned: "the intriguing collage cover of Hamburg Demonstrations is the best thing about this album, which feels unfinished, more like a gathering of demos than a realized, cohesive collection".

=== Accolades ===
Accolades for Hamburg Demonstrations
Publication	Accolade	Rank	Ref.
Gigwise	Gigwise's 51 Best Albums of 2016	5	

== Track listing ==
All tracks are written by Peter Doherty.

No.	Title	Length
1.	"Kolly Kibber"	3:57
2.	"Down for the Outing"	3:43
3.	"Birdcage"	3:31
4.	"Hell to Pay at the Gates of Heaven"	2:40
5.	"Flags from the Old Regime"	3:26
6.	"I Don't Love Anyone (But You're Not Just Anyone) V2"	3:36
7.	"A Spy in the House of Love" (Demo Vocals)	3:32
8.	"Oily Boker"	5:36
9.	"I Don't Love Anyone (But You're Not Just Anyone)"	3:26
10.	"The Whole World Is Our Playground"	2:48
11.	"She Is Far"	3:15
Total length:		39:30

== Personnel ==
- Peter Doherty — lyrics, vocals, guitar, acoustic guitar, harmonica, artwork
- Sonja Glass — choir vocals, bass
- Valeska Steiner — choir vocals
- Suzie Martin — vocals (track 3)
- Sebastian Nagel — guitar, slide guitar
- Albrecht Schrader — piano, electric piano
- Johann Scheerer — synthesizer, producer, recording, mixing
- James Johnston — organ (track 3)
- Thies Mynther — organ (track 7)
- Franziska Plückhan — bass (track 4)
- Leo Kurunis — bass (tracks: 7–9)
- Tim Schierenbeck — drums
- Ian White — drums (tracks: 7–9)
- Nils Herzogenrath — tambourine (track 10)
- Benjamin Spillner — violin (tracks: 6, 8, 11)
- Gregor Dierck — violin (tracks: 6, 8, 11)
- Maresi Stumpf — viola (tracks: 6, 8, 11)
- Daniel Sorour — violoncello (tracks: 2, 6, 8, 11)
- Chris von Rautenkranz — mastering
- Florian Siller — mastering assistant
- Fabian Heinitz — artwork, layout
- Klaus Ib Jørgensen — artwork

== Charts ==
Chart (2016)	Peak position
Austrian Albums (Ö3 Austria)	67
Belgian Albums (Ultratop Flanders)	107
Belgian Albums (Ultratop Wallonia)	132
French Albums (SNEP)	104
German Albums (Offizielle Top 100)	68
Scottish Albums (OCC)	56
Swiss Albums (Schweizer Hitparade)	48
UK Albums (OCC)	61
UK Album Downloads (OCC)	54
UK Independent Albums (OCC)	7
