= Jan Philipp Reemtsma =

German literary scholar and author

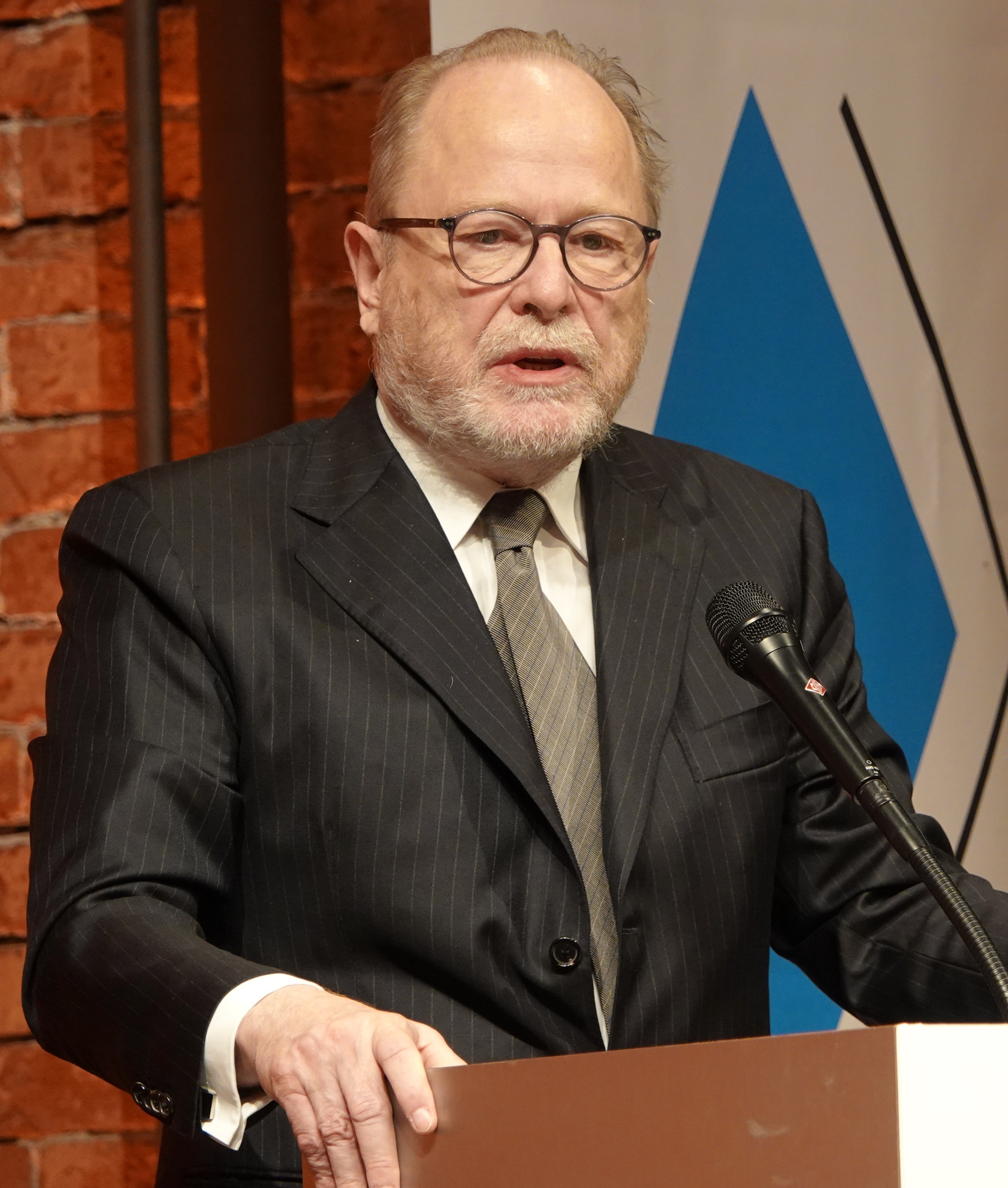
Jan Philipp Reemtsma (2023)

Jan Philipp Fürchtegott Reemtsma (born 26 November 1952) is a German literary scholar, author, and patron who founded and was the long-term director of the Hamburg Institute for Social Research. Reemtsma lives and works mainly in Hamburg. In 1996, Reemtsma was kidnapped by Thomas Drach and only released after a ransom of 30 million German Marks was paid.

== Biography ==
Reemtsma was born in Bonn, West Germany, the son of cigarette manufacturer Philipp Fürchtegott Reemtsma and Gertrud Reemtsma (née Zülch). He grew up in the Blankenese district of Hamburg and attended the Gymnasium Christianeum in Othmarschen. He studied German literature and philosophy at the University of Hamburg (PhD), where he has been active as a professor of German literature since 1996. He was awarded a PhD in philosophy there in 1993.

According to his father's will, Reemtsma was allowed to access of his inheritance after reaching the age of 26. He sold his inherited majority stake in the Reemtsma group in 1980 to the Hamburg entrepreneurial family Herz (Tchibo).

Musician and music producer Johann Scheerer is his son.

== Kidnapping ==
On 25 March 1996, Reemtsma was the victim of a kidnapping in which four men were involved. They released him on 26 April after receiving a ransom of 30 million German Marks. The mastermind of the kidnapping was tracked down in South America and extradited to Germany in 2000. The accomplices were also found and sentenced to many years in prison.

Reemtsma has also written a bestselling account of his experiences during a 1996 kidnapping (published in German as Im Keller in 1997, in English as In the Cellar in 1999, in French as Dans la cave in 2000 as well as in many other languages).

== Activities ==
Arno Schmidt

In 1977, Reemtsma offered the novelist Arno Schmidt, who suffered from a heart condition, the equivalent of a Nobel Prize in the amount of 350,000 German Marks as support to ensure his independence. Two years after Schmidt's death, Reemtsma founded the Arno-Schmidt-Stiftung (Arno Schmidt Foundation) in 1981.

Reemtsma and HIS produced two exhibitions about war crimes of the Wehrmacht collectively known as the Wehrmacht exhibition. The first exhibition opened in 1995, and traveled to 33 German and Austrian cities.

Wieland Edition

Since the 1990s, Reemtsma has served as co-editor of the Oßmannstedter Ausgabe, the first complete critical edition of Christoph Martin Wieland's works, published by De Gruyter and supported by the German Research Foundation.

== Hamburg Institute for Social Research ==
In 1984 Reemtsma founded the Hamburger Institut für Sozialforschung (Hamburg Institute for Social Research (HIS)), which he led from 1984 to 2015. The institute has around 60 employees, publishes the journal Mittelweg 36 and is financed from the foundation's assets.

The three research units of the HIS are:

- Theory and History of Violence
- The Society of the Federal Republic of Germany
- Nation and Society

Reemtsma also headed the 1995 project Violence and Destructiveness in the Twentieth Century (Gewalt und Destruktivität im 20. Jahrhundert).

Two exhibitions were realized:

- "200 Days and 1 Century" focused on violence in the twentieth century and was presented in Germany, Austria, and in Caen, France.
- an exhibition on crimes of the German Wehrmacht, the first of two highly publicized exhibitions which drew more than one million visitors at some forty venues in Germany, Austria, and Luxemburg.

In January 2024, it was announced that the institute would be closed in 2028.

== Hamburg Foundation for the Advancement of Research and Culture ==
In 1984, Reemtsma founded the Hamburg Foundation for the Advancement of Research and Culture and, as its chairman, supported numerous editions and archives, including those of Theodor W. Adorno, Jean Améry and Walter Benjamin.

== Christoph Martin Wieland ==
As co-editor of numerous editions of Christoph Martin Wieland's works, Reemtsma played a major role in the restoration of Wieland's long-neglected Oßmannstedt estate near Weimar, which was reopened on 25 June 2005 as a museum and research centre. In March 2023, Reemtsma published his comprehensive biography of Wieland. For this, he received a nomination for the Leipzig Book Fair Prize in the category of non-fiction.

== Further patronage ==
In 1986, he helped to finance the Hamburg Foundation for Politically Persecuted People, which was founded on the initiative of the former mayor of Hamburg, Klaus von Dohnanyi. Reemtsma is a member of the international non-profit foundation Luwian Studies, which aims to research knowledge about the second millennium BC in western Asia Minor.

== Professorships ==
Reemtsma has been an honorary professor of modern German literature at the University of Hamburg since 1996. In 1999, he held the Mercator professorship at the Gerhard Mercator University of Duisburg (now the University of Duisburg-Essen). In 2008, he was a visiting professor at the University of Mainz and in 2009 at the Friedrich Schiller University of Jena (Schiller Professorship 2009).

== Private life ==
Reemtsma is married to the psychoanalyst Ann Kathrin Scheerer. Their son, the musician and music producer Johann Scheerer, published We Are Next of Kin, a book about his father's kidnapping in 2018. The book was adapted by Hans-Christian Schmid and released in cinemas in November 2022. Reemtsma is played by Philipp Hauß.

== Archive ==
In November 2017, Jan Philipp Reemtsma handed over his literary and scientific archive to the Deutsches Literaturarchiv Marbach. In addition to correspondence with contemporary writers and scholars, such as Hans Magnus Enzensberger and Marcel Reich-Ranicki, it also contains preparatory work for publications and documents on scientific, artistic and social projects, publishers and magazines that he has supported.

== Other activities ==
In 2001, Reemtsma gave the laudatory speech for Jürgen Habermas on the occasion of his being awarded the Peace Prize of the German Book Trade, and he gave the laudatory speech for Alexander Kluge on 25 October 2003 at the Darmstadt ceremony for the Georg Büchner Prize. From 2003 to 2006, he was a member of the Deutsche Akademie für Sprache und Dichtung in Darmstadt and from 2013 to 2016 a member of the German Science and Humanities Council. He is a member of the PEN Centre Germany.

From 2012 to the end of 2015, he served as the honorary consul of the Republic of Slovenia for Hamburg and Schleswig-Holstein.

== Memberships ==
- Deutsche Akademie für Sprache und Dichtung
- Freie Akademie der Künste Hamburg

== Awards ==
- Copernicus Medal of the University of Kraków (1987)
- Lessing Prize of the Free and Hanseatic City of Hamburg (1997)
- Honorary doctorate of the University of Konstanz (1999)
- Mercator-Professorship University of Duisburg-Essen (1999)
- Nicolas Born Prize (2001)
- Leibniz Medal of the Berlin-Brandenburg Academy of Sciences (2002)
- Heinz Galinski Prize for fostering German-Jewish understanding (2003)
- Julius-Campe-Prize (2005)
- Honorary doctorate of the University of Magdeburg (2007)
- Teddy Kollek Award of the Jerusalem Foundation (ceremony in Israel's Knesset in October 2007)
- Johannes Gutenberg-Stiftungsprofessur (2008)
- Ferdinand Tönnies Medal of the University of Kiel (2008)
- Schiller-Professorship of the University of Jena (2008)
- Award for Outstanding Contributions to the Influence of Sociology on Public Life of the Deutsche Gesellschaft für Soziologie (German Sociological Association; 2009)
- Jewish Museum Award for Understanding and Tolerance (Berlin; 2010)
- Schiller Prize of the City of Mannheim (2011)
- Schader Award (Darmstadt; 2011)
- Moses Mendelssohn Prize (2022)
- Weimar Prize (2022)
- Bayerischer Buchpreis (2023)
- Wuppertaler Poetikdozentur für faktuales Erzählen (2024)

In keeping with Hanseatic tradition, Reemtsma declined to accept the Federal Cross of Merit that had been offered to him.

== Selected publications ==
=== In German ===
- with Mauro Basaure, Rasmus Willig (eds.): Erneuerung der Kritik. Axel Honneth im Gespräch [Renewing Critique: A Conversation with Axel Honneth], Frankfurt a.M.: Campus, 2009
- Vertrauen und Gewalt. Versuch über eine besondere Konstellation der Moderne [Trust and Violence: An Attempt to Understand a Unique Constellation in Modernity], Hamburg 2008
- Lessing in Hamburg [Lessing in Hamburg], München 2007
- Über Arno Schmidt: Vermessungen eines poetischen Terrains [About Arno Schmidt: Surveying a Poetic Terrain], Frankfurt/M 2006
- Das unaufhebbare Nichtbescheidwissen der Mehrheit: Sechs Reden über Literatur und Kunst [The Majority's Unalterable Lack of Understanding: Six Lectures on Literature and Art] München 2005
- Folter im Rechtsstaat? [Torture in Constitutional States?], Hamburg 2005
- Rudi Dutschke Andreas Baader und die RAF [Rudi Dutschke Andreas Baader and the RAF], Hamburg 2005 (with Wolfgang Kraushaar and Karin Wieland)
- Warum Hagen Jung-Ortlieb erschlug. Unzeitgemäßes über Krieg und Tod [Why Hagen Slew Jung-Ortlieb: Untimely Thoughts on War and Death], München 2003
- Verbrechensopfer. Gesetz und Gerechtigkeit [Victims of Crime: Law and Justice], München 2002 (with Winfried Hassemer)
- Die Gewalt spricht nicht. Drei Reden [Violence Does Not Speak: Three Lectures], Stuttgart 2002
- Wie hätte ich mich verhalten? und andere nicht nur deutsche Fragen [How Would I Have Acted? And Other, Not Only German Questions], München 2001
- Der Liebe Maskentanz. Aufsätze zum Werk Christoph Martin Wielands [Love's Masquerade Dance: Essays on the Works of Christoph Martin Wieland], Zürich 1999
- Das Recht des Opfers auf die Bestrafung des Täters – als Problem [The Victim's Right to Punishment of the Perpetrator – as a Problem], München 1999
- Mord am Strand. Allianzen von Zivilisation und Barbarei. Aufsätze und Reden [Murder on the Beach: Alliances of Civilization and Barbarianism: Essays and Lectures], Hamburg 1998
- Der Vorgang des Ertaubens nach dem Urknall. 10 Reden und Aufsätze [The Process of Turning Deaf after the Big Bang: Ten Lectures and Essays], Zürich 1995
- Das Buch vom Ich. Christoph Martin Wielands "Aristipp und einige seiner Zeitgenossen". [The Book of Ego: Christoph Martin Wieland's "Aristipp and Some of His Contemporaries"], Zürich 1993

=== In English ===
- Reemtsma, Jan Philipp (2012). Trust and violence : an essay on a modern relationship. Princeton: Princeton University Press. ISBN 978-1-4008-4234-6. OCLC 779828643.
- Ali, Muhammad; Alfred Herrhausen Gesellschaft für Internationalen Dialog (2002). The end of tolerance?. London: Nicholas Brealey. ISBN 1-85788-317-9. OCLC 59483099.
- "The Concept of the War of Annihilation: Clausewitz, Ludendorff, Hitler", In: Heer, Hannes; Naumann, Klaus (2000). War of extermination : the German military in World War II, 1941-1944. New York: Berghahn Books. ISBN 1-57181-232-6. OCLC 42290853.
- Reemtsma, Jan Philipp (2000). In the cellar. London: Vintage. ISBN 0-09-927346-2. OCLC 42952386.
- Reemtsma, Jan Philipp (1998). More than a champion : the style of Muhammad Ali. New York. ISBN 978-0-307-48100-9. OCLC 773835045.
- "R.J.B. Bosworth: Explaining Auschwitz and Hiroshima. History Writing and the Second World War, 1945–1990", Book Review, in: Journal of Modern History, 69/1, March 1997
- "Wolfgang Sofsky: Die Ordnung des Terrors. Das Konzentrationslager", Book Review, in: International Review of Social History, Vol. 40, Part 1, April 1995-->

=== In French ===
- Reemtsma, Jan Philipp; Marcou, Léa (2000). Dans la cave (in French). Paris: Pauvert. ISBN 2-7202-1393-4. OCLC 406667126.
