= We Are Next of Kin =

- german: Wir sind dann wohl die Angehörigen
- Directed by: Hans-Christian Schmid
- Production company: 23/5 Filmproduktion
- Release date: 3 November 2022
- Running time: 118 minutes
- Country: Germany

We Are Next of Kin (German: Wir sind dann wohl die Angehörigen) is a 2022 German coming-of-age psychological drama film directed by Hans-Christian Schmid, based on the autobiographical book of the same name by Johann Scheerer. The story is about the kidnapping of Jan Philipp Reemtsma, but from the point of view of his son Johann, then 13 years old. Following its premiere at the 2022 Hamburg Film Festival, it was released in German cinemas on 3 November 2022.

== Cast ==
- Claude Heinrich: Johann Scheerer
- Adina Vetter: Ann Kathrin Scheerer
- Justus von Dohnányi: Johann Schwenn
- Hans Löw: Christian Schneider
- Yorck Dippe: Vera
- Enno Trebs: Nickel
- Fabian Hinrichs: Rainer Osthoff
- Philipp Hauß: Jan Philipp Reemtsma
- Theresa Berlage: Claudia Brockmann
- Knud Riepen: Michael Herrmann
- Jan-Peter Kampwirth: Pastor Christian Arndt
- Uwe Zerwer: Professor Clausen
- Caspar Hoffman: Tobias
- Oskar Lampen: Kai
- Ivo Dahlmann: Daniel
- Tim Porath: Jürgen Jaitner

== Reception ==
Daniel Kothenschulte praised the film in the Frankfurter Rundschau as "a rare gem of German cinema". It is a "psychological drama of seductive power". In his film review in the Frankfurter Allgemeine Zeitung, Andreas Kilb acknowledged Schmid's ability to have a clear stance and an unshakable visual instinct.

Martina Knoben wrote in the Süddeutsche Zeitung that the film is “[really] […] completely unsentimental”, “almost brutally sober. Entertainment cinema likes to find the silver lining in tragedies, but Hans-Christian Schmid denies any meaning to the perpetrators and the crime." In Deutschlandfunk Kultur, Jörg Taszman called the production a "strong piece of cinema with excellent actors ". The director manages to "maintain the suspense, capturing the endless and grueling wait in a subtle way".

In his review in Screen Daily, Tim Gierson said it is "a slow-burn drama (...) Schmid subtly illustrates how this gruelling odyssey has forever changed a family".
