= Honora (album) =

Studio album by Flea
- Released: March 27, 2026
- Recorded: February 2025
- Studios: Sunset Sound (Hollywood); Soundtree (London)
- Genre: Jazz
- Length: 51:12
- Label: Nonesuch
- Producer: Josh Johnson

Flea chronology
Helen Burns (2013)	Honora (2026)

Singles from Honora
- 1. "A Plea" Released: December 2, 2025; 2. "Traffic Lights" Released: January 14, 2026; 3. "Thinkin Bout You" Released: February 11, 2026

Honora is the debut solo album by Red Hot Chili Peppers bassist Flea, released on March 27, 2026, through Nonesuch. It was produced by Josh Johnson. The album was inspired by Flea's love for jazz, and features six original songs along with covers of songs originally by Eddie Hazel and George Clinton, Jimmy Webb, Frank Ocean and Shea Taylor, and Ann Ronell.

Flea provided spoken-word vocals, bass and trumpet. Thom Yorke and Nick Cave provided guest vocals. Johnson performed saxophone and keyboards, and the backing band features guitarist Jeff Parker, bassist Anna Butterss, and drummer Deantoni Parks, with additional contributions from Mauro Refosco and Nathaniel Walcott and two other members of the Red Hot Chili Peppers.

The first single, "A Plea", was released on December 2, 2025; the release included a music video directed by Flea's daughter Clara Balzary. It was followed by "Traffic Lights", featuring Yorke. A music video directed by nespy5euro was released to promote the song. The third single, an instrumental cover of Frank Ocean's "Thinkin Bout You", was released on February 11, 2026. The album will be promoted by a short tour in May 2026.

The album was named after Flea's great-great-grandmother and inspired by her difficulties with poverty in Ireland and her immigration to Australia. The cover art features a 1960s photo of Flea's mother-in-law Shahin Badiyan in Iran.

== Critical reception ==
Professional ratings
Aggregate scores
Source	Rating
AnyDecentMusic?	7.2/10
Metacritic	75/100
Review scores
Source	Rating
AllMusic	3.5/5 stars
The Arts Desk	4/5 stars
Clash	8/10
Exclaim!	7/10
The Guardian	4/5 stars
The Line of Best Fit	8/10
Mojo	4/5 stars
NME	4/5 stars
Pitchfork	7.3/10
Uncut	4/5 stars

According to the review aggregator Metacritic, Honora received "generally favorable reviews" based on a weighted average score of 75 out of 100 from 14 critic scores. The review aggregator Any Decent Music gave the album a weighted average score of 7.2 out of 10 from 14 critic scores.

The publication Mojo wrote a review in which it states that "Flea proves to be a nice rather than barnstorming trumpeter, albeit a subtly ambitious one". Meanwhile, The Guardian wrote that "Honora is never dilettantish, but sincere, exploratory, and soulful". Soundwaves contributor Michael Venn wrote, "What makes Honora compelling isn’t just the music, it’s what it reveals about Flea. This feels like a true artist addressing his own history."

== Track listing ==
All tracks are written by Flea, except where noted.

Honora track listing
No.	Title	Writer(s)	Length
1.	"Golden Wingship"		1:01
2.	"A Plea"		7:39
3.	"Traffic Lights" (featuring Thom Yorke)	Flea; Josh Johnson; Yorke	5:41
4.	"Frailed"		10:50
5.	"Morning Cry"		3:31
6.	"Maggot Brain"	Eddie Hazel; George Clinton	4:52
7.	"Wichita Lineman" (featuring Nick Cave)	Jimmy Webb	4:22
8.	"Thinkin' Bout You"	Frank Ocean; Shea Taylor	4:10
9.	"Willow Weep for Me"	Ann Ronnell	3:53
10.	"Free As I Want to Be"		5:13
Total length:			51:12

== Personnel ==
Credits are adapted from the album's liner notes.

=== Musicians ===
- Flea – electric bass (tracks 1–4, 8, 10), vocals (2, 10), trumpet (2–6, 8–10), Flumpet (7)
- Deantoni Parks – drums (1–5, 7, 10), vocals (2)
- Mauro Refosco – percussion (1–4, 7)
- Nathaniel Walcott – Fender Rhodes (1, 3, 4), vocals (2); string arrangement, string orchestration (8)
- Anna Butterss – upright bass (1, 2, 5, 7, 8), vocals (2)
- Jeff Parker – guitar (1–5, 7, 9, 10), vocals (2)
- Chad Smith – drums (1)
- Josh Johnson – alto saxophone (2, 3), vocals (2, 10), piano (4, 10), Moog synthesizer (9)
- Rickey Washington – alto flute (2)
- Vikram Devasthali – trombone (2)
- Chris Warren – vocals (2)
- Thom Yorke – vocals, piano, synthesizer (3)
- Warren Ellis – alto flute, viola (4)
- John Frusciante – treatments (4, 9)
- Sasha Berliner – vibraphone (6)
- Brian Walsh – clarinet, bass clarinet (6)
- Derek Davis – flute (6)
- Nick Cave – vocals (7)
- Suzie Katayama – conductor (8)
- Paul Cartwright – concertmaster (8)
- Luanne Homzy – violin (8)
- Alyssa Park – violin (8)
- Stephanie Matthews – violin (8)
- Jennifer Takamatsu – violin (8)
- Andrew Duckles – viola (8)
- Zach Dellinger – viola (8)
- Vanessa Freebairn-Smith – cello (8)
- Jacob Braun – cello (8)
- Thomas Harte – bass (8)
- Joel Virgel Vierset – vocals (10)
- Cyprienne Virgel Vierset – vocals (10)
- SJ Hasman – vocals (10)
- Julian Hasman – vocals (10)
- Melissa Dougherty – vocals (10)
- Jessica Vautor – vocals (10)
- Alejandro Montoya – vocals (10)

=== Technical and creative ===
- Josh Johnson – production
- Clint Welander – recording
- Ryan Hewitt – mixing (1–8, 10), additional mixing (9)
- John Frusciante – mixing (9)
- Luis Almau – additional recording (7), photography of Warren Ellis
- Eric Boulanger – mastering
- Melody Ehsani – design
- Kelsey Kay – design
- Shahin Badiyan – cover model
- Gavin Bowden – interior photography
- Colin Greenwood – photography of Nick Cave
- Chris Warren – technical support
- Maya Bouvier-Lyons – additional design, coordination

== Charts ==
=== Weekly charts ===
Weekly chart performance for Honora
Chart (2026)	Peak position
Australian Albums (ARIA)	22
Australian Jazz & Blues Albums (ARIA)	1
Austrian Albums (Ö3 Austria)	34
Belgian Albums (Ultratop Flanders)	10
Belgian Albums (Ultratop Wallonia)	8
Croatian International Albums (HDU)	5
Dutch Albums (Album Top 100)	23
French Albums (SNEP)	44
French Jazz Albums (SNEP)	1
German Albums (Offizielle Top 100)	32
Greek Albums (IFPI)	7
Hungarian Albums (MAHASZ)	31
Italian Albums (FIMI)	86
Japanese Albums (Oricon)	24
Japanese Digital Albums (Oricon)	21
Japanese Download Albums (Billboard Japan)	22
Japanese Top Albums Sales (Billboard Japan)	32
New Zealand Albums (RMNZ)	20
Polish Albums (ZPAV)	26
Portuguese Albums (AFP)	38
Scottish Albums (Official Charts)	24
Swiss Albums (Schweizer Hitparade)	8
UK Albums Sales (OCC)	20
UK Jazz & Blues Albums (Official Charts)	1
US Top Album Sales (Billboard)	16
US Top Jazz Albums (Billboard)	2
US Top Contemporary Jazz Albums (Billboard)	2

=== Monthly charts ===
Monthly chart performance for Honora
Chart (2026)	Peak position
Croatian International Vinyls (HDU)	1
German Jazz Albums (Offizielle Top 100)	1
