= Deantoni Parks =

American musician

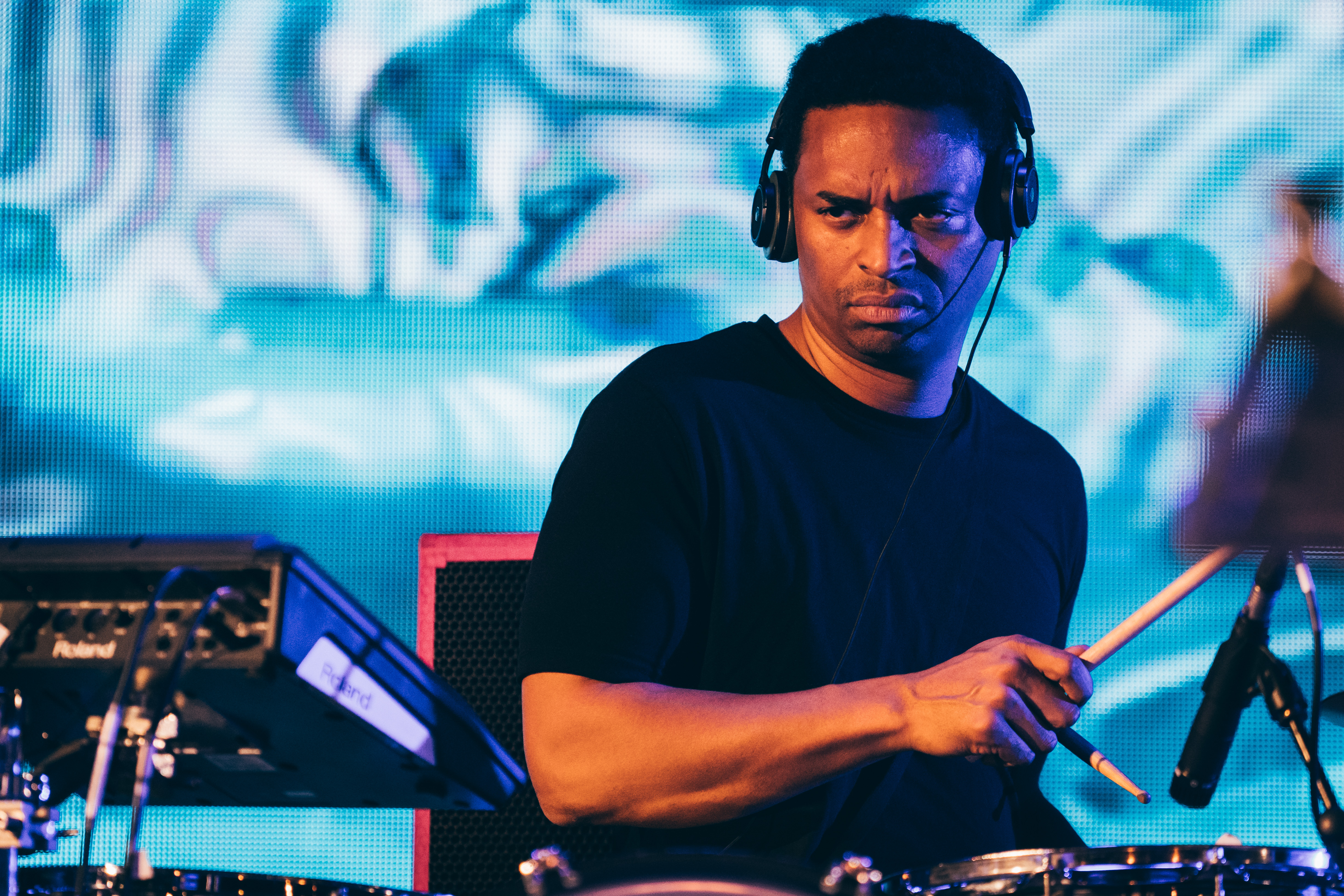
- Parks in 2020

Background information
- Born: November 2, 1977 (age 49); Newnan, Georgia, U.S.
- Genres: Alternative rock; Avant-garde; New wave; Experimental rock
- Occupations: Musician, producer, songwriter
- Instruments: Drums, keyboard
- Years active: 1982–present
- Website: deantonitechnoself.com

Deantoni Parks (born November 2, 1977) is an American musician. He is the co-founder, co-producer and drummer of the New York band Kudu, along with artist Sylvia Black, and a member of the TV/film-scoring duo We Are Dark Angels which also comprises Kudu member Nicci Kasper. Parks was a member of progressive rock band The Mars Volta and (together with Kasper) a member of the alternative rock act Bosnian Rainbows. Parks is a composer and performer on the André 3000 album, New Blue Sun (2023), and contributed to Flea's debut solo album, Honora (2026).

Based in Atlanta, Georgia, Parks is the founder of Tech Art Fair, Technoself Immersive, the record label Humani Machina (via Alpha Pup distributed by Virgin/UMG), and private online school Technoself School of Philosophy (since 2020). Parks has participated as faculty for Stanford Jazz Workshop and Berklee College of Music, also performing workshops and clinics at Cooper Union, Georgia Tech, and Virginia Tech.

== Biography ==
Deantoni was born and raised in Newnan, Georgia. His family's musical preferences leaned towards funk, Southern soul and gospel and with their full support he began playing drums when he was two years old. He was put in the national spotlight before the age of five as a result of his practice and performance with the Newnan High School band. Xernona Clayton from The Xernona Clayton Show broadcast on WAGA-TV in Atlanta interviewed him for a national broadcast segment that aired in 1982.

He later explored jazz as a teen with Delbert Felix and chose to enroll at Berklee College of Music, where study with Lenny Nelson and exposure to Photek, Squarepusher, and Hidden Agenda turned his focus to the mechanistic beats of electronic music.

=== Kudu ===
In 1998, while living in Boston, Deantoni drafted the New Wave Manifesto. It was these beliefs that provided the foundation for the core song structures that ultimately led to the recording of the Kudu demo. He founded Kudu with his then girlfriend Sylvia Gordon, Nicci Kasper.

Kudu was performing Photek, Roni Size and Cujo covers at venues (name specific venues or shows with select acts) around Boston. Due to Deantoni's ability to play hyper/punk/virtuosic rhythms live, Kudu inspired and influenced many American drummers and live drum and bass acts from 2000 on. Bill Laswell, Vernon Reid (Living Colour) and Jojo Mayer were all seen at early Kudu shows after the band relocated to New York City in 2000.

Kudu released their self-titled debut on Velour Recordings, a New York-based label, in 2001. The band eventually agreed to terms with Nublu Records and in 2006 the label released their Death of the Party album. NuBlu also released Back for More: A Remix Collection. The album featured a cherry-picked selection of unreleased tracks, B-sides, rare recordings and remixes by Armand Van Helden, Tommie Sunshine, Sinden, Drop the Lime, King Britt, Curtis Vodka, Hess Is More, LingLing and others.

Between summer 2006 and the fall of 2007 they performed at the Roskilde Festival held south of Roskilde in Denmark, Delta Tejo Festival in Portugal and Transmusicales held annually in Rennes, Brittany, France. Their last public performance was opening for Me'shell Ndegeocello at the Highline Ballroom in the fall of 2009.

Despite Kudu's early success, the group has not released an album since 2008's Back for More. Nicci Kasper, Sylvia Gordon and Deantoni have all continued to write and produce tracks for other artists including John Cale and Me'shell Ndegeocello. In early 2009 Deantoni and Nick Kasper began collaborating as the writing duo We Are Dark Angels.

=== Omar Rodriguez-Lopez Group / The Mars Volta / Bosnian Rainbows ===
Parks briefly joined The Mars Volta in September 2006, following the departure of Blake Fleming. Touring with the band for two months, Parks was subsequently replaced by Thomas Pridgen. Regarding his exit from the band, Parks stated, "I was already working heavily with John Cale at the time, and also Kudu. And, to be honest, at the time, I was just more loyal to them, obviously. And, you know, [The Mars Volta] were looking for drummers too. I was just there to fill-in, or whatever. I mean I clicked really, really well with Omar and I always remember that so I never blocked out the idea of working with them again. It was just that time, it was a weird time for me to join then so that's why it didn't happen."

Deantoni joined the Omar Rodriguez-Lopez Group on their autumn 2010 tour across Japan, the US and Russia. He has also recorded on many of Omar's albums since 2008's release Old Money, for which his contribution had been recorded when Deantoni first joined The Mars Volta in 2006. He rejoined The Mars Volta in late 2010 and stayed until their dissolution after 2012's Noctourniquet tour. During this time frame he was also working on music with Mars Volta members Cedric Bixler-Zavala and Juan Alderete on their respective projects, although all are yet to see official releases besides Deantoni making appearances on Big Sir records.

Together with Rodriguez-Lopez, singer Teri Gender Bender of Le Butcherettes and his Kudu/Dark Angels bandmate Kasper, Parks formed a new band called Bosnian Rainbows in 2012. Their first full-length, self-titled album was released on June 25, 2013.

On May 17, 2019, Parks and Rodriguez-Lopez played as a duo at the inaugural Technoself Immersive fair, which was created by Parks himself.

== Teaching ==
Deantoni's work as an instructor at Stanford Jazz Workshop, and Berklee College of Music since '98 led to him to creating Technoself School of Philosophy in 2020 operating privately as an online school via Discord.

== Discography ==
Solo Work

- Touch But Don't Look (2012) on Sargent House/Rodriguez-Lopez Productions
- Technoself (Leaving/Stones Throw; 2015)
- WALLY (2016)
- Deanthoven (2016)
- Look This (2016) as WE ARE DARK ANGELS
- ELEVENELEVEN (2017)
- Dog Eat Dog (Original Motion Picture Soundtrack) (2017)
- Homo Deus (Leaving/Stones Throw; 2018)
- Augusta (Humani Machina Records, Alpha Pup Records) 2019
- Westwave (2019)
- Silver Cord (Humani Machina Records, Alpha Pup Records) 2020
- OBSERVERS (2025)

Collaborations

- Last Night – Moby (2008) – contribution to an LP
- The Biggest Piano In Town - Grand Pianoramax on ObliqSound (2008), Leo Tardin - keyboards, Deantoni Parks - drums, Adam Deitch - drums, Mike Ladd - vocals, Celena Glenn - vocals, Invincible - vocals, Spleen - vocals

With Astroid Power-Up!

- Google Plex (2003) - LP

With Gray

- 1979 (Unreleased) - LP
- Shades of... (2019)

With Kudu

- Kudu (2001) - LP
- Death of the Party (2006) - LP
- Back for More: A Remix Collection (2008) - LP

With John Cale

- Circus Live (2007)
- Extra Playful (2011)
- Shifty Adventures in Nookie Wood (2012)
- M:FANS (2016)
- Mercy (2023)

With Meshell Ndegeocello

- The Article 3 (2006)
- The World Has Made Me the Man of My Dreams (2007)
- Devil's Halo (2009)
- Weather (2011)
- Pour une Âme Souveraine: A Dedication to Nina Simone (2012)

With Omar Rodríguez-López

- Old Money (2008) ("The Power of Myth")
- Solar Gambling (2009) ("Locomoción Capilar", "Las Flores Con Limón", "Vasco de Gama")
- Dōitashimashite (2010) - Omar Rodriguez Lopez Group live release
- Un Escorpión Perfumado (2010)
- Saber, Querer, Osar y Callar (2012)
- Unicorn Skeleton Mask (2013)
- ¿Sólo Extraño? (2013)
- Sworn Virgins (2016)
- Blind Worms Pious Swine (2016)
- El Bien Y Mal Nos Une (2016)
- Cell Phone Bikini (2016)
- Zapopan (2016)
- Nom de Guerre Cabal (2016)
- Some Need It Lonely (2016)
- A Lovejoy (2016)
- Roman Lips (2017)
- Zen Thrills (2017)
- Chocolate Tumor Hormone Parade (2017) - Omar Rodriguez Lopez Group live release
- Gorilla Preacher Cartel (2017)
- Killing Tingled Lifting Retreats (2017)
- Solid State Mercenaries (2017)
- Doom Patrol (2017)

With The Mars Volta

- Noctourniquet (2012)

With Bosnian Rainbows

- Bosnian Rainbows Live At Clouds Hill (2012)
- Bosnian Rainbows (2013)
- TBA - Bosnian Rainbows' 2nd LP

With Big Sir

- Before Gardens After Gardens (2012)
- Digital Gardens (2014)

With Flying Lotus

- You're Dead! (2014)
- Flamagra (2019)

With Le Butcherettes

- A Raw Youth (2015) ("La Uva" w/ Iggy Pop)

With André 3000

- New Blue Sun (2023)

With Flea

- Honora (2026)

== Filmography ==
Feature films

Deantoni is composer as We Are Dark Angels alongside Nicci Kasper on Dog Eat Dog (2016). Dog Eat Dog is directed by Paul Schrader (Taxi Driver, Mishima) and stars Nicolas Cage and Willem Dafoe. It is based on the Edward Bunker novel of the same name. Deantoni Parks and Nicci Kasper as We Are Dark Angels scored the last scene of director Paul Schrader's First Reformed. Lustmord a.k.a. Brian Williams scored the rest of the film.

Deantoni was featured as an actor and drummer in Mark Ruffalo's directorial debut, Sympathy for Delicious, along with Juliette Lewis, Laura Linney, Orlando Bloom and Mark Ruffalo. He also performed on the title track for the movie with The Mars Volta's Cedric Bixler and Omar Rodriguez-Lopez. Deantoni appeared on the soundtrack of the Tamra Davis documentary The Radiant Child, with Michael Holman and Jean-Michel Basquiat's band Gray.

Short films

While touring the globe between 1998 and 2009, Deantoni collected hours of video footage. In 2009, he compiled this footage and edited it with photographs from these travels to create a series of ten videos. These ten videos encompass the whole of the DaDa YaYa video series. These short films, all of which are three to ten minutes in length, will be produced as Sound Art/Installation/Performance Art pieces. The entire series consists of ten installations (one for each film) and a retrospective, where all of the films will be screened in their entirety. The event series will be produced and marketed by his audio/visual communications agency.

Music videos

- Playing House (2005) for Kudu
- Bar Star kudu - bar star (2006) for Kudu
- Boom Boom Kudu Boom Boom (2006) for Kudu

Collaborations

- In 2007, Deantoni played drums for a World's End music video titled "Sialagogue" featuring Japanese super model Rila Fukushima, directed by Bruno Levy, a New York-based artist known for his video scratching. Bruno, considered a pioneer in the VJ space, and his current project partner, Blake Shaw, have formed SWEATSHOPPE. Together with Deantoni they are developing large-scale event proposals that will be marketed by his audio/visual communications agency under the World's End event series.
- Deantoni co-wrote the music for the song "Party In My Pants" with Doron Braunshtein a.k.a. Apollo Braun. The song appears in the 2008 film Religulous, directed by Larry Charles.
- He played drums for two songs on the 2017 album Drunk, by Thundercat: "Jethro" and "Where I'm Going".

== Band history ==
- Astroid Power-up!
- Kudu
- The Mars Volta
- Omar Rodríguez-López
- Bosnian Rainbows
- John Cale
- Meshell Ndegeocello
- Moby
- Lenny Kravitz
- Alice Smith
- Cody Chesnutt
- Gray, Basquiat's industrial noise band
- Sade
- Marc Ribot
- Vato Negro
- We Are Dark Angels (with Nicci Kasper)
- World's End
