= Waterside Contemporary =

Defunct art gallery in London, England

Coordinates: 51.532°N 0.096°W

Waterside Contemporary was a visual art gallery in Hackney, central-east London. The gallery's programme focused on politically- and socially-engaged artists, including Oreet Ashery, George Barber, Mirza and Butler, Nikita Kadan, and Chiara Fumai. The gallery exhibition programme involved over a hundred artists like Libia Castro & Ólafur Ólafsson, Mathilde ter Heijne, Slavs and Tatars in nearly thirty exhibitions, performances, public events, publishing, and institutional collaborations.

Waterside Contemporary was founded in 2008 by Pierre d'Alancaisez as the Waterside Project Space, named after the Waterside building on Wharf Road in which it was located. Initially an artist-run not-for-profit, the gallery became commercially active in 2010 with a presentation at ViennaFair. Olga Ovenden became co-director with the gallery's move to nearby Hoxton. The gallery stopped exhibiting operations under the Waterside name in 2017.

Waterside Contemporary commissioned, curated and premiered landmark works such as Animal with a Language by Oreet Ashery, The Unreliable Narrator by Karen Mirza and Brad Butler, and The Freestone Drone by George Barber.

In 2024, the team behind Waterside Contemporary launched Verdurin, a cultural project space in the former gallery's premises.

== Notable exhibitions ==
=== 2013 ===
- Long ago, and not true anyway, a group exhibition with Joana Hadjithomas and Khalil Joreige, Rabih Mroué, et al.
- Reconstitution, an event at Soho House accompanying the exhibition

=== 2014 ===
- Animal with a Language, a solo exhibition by Oreet Ashery
- The Unreliable Narrator, a solo exhibition by Karen Mirza and Brad Butler
- The Freestone Drone, a solo exhibition by George Barber

=== 2015 ===
- Nascent States, a group exhibition with Olivia Plender, Mathilde ter Heijne, Chiara Fumai, Anetta Mona Chişa & Lucia Tkáčova, Pauline Boudry / Renate Lorenz, Judith Barry, et al.
- Limits of Responsibility, a solo exhibition by Nikita Kadan

=== 2016 ===
- The Book of Evil Spirits, a solo exhibition by Chiara Fumai
