= George Barber (artist) =

British video artist

- Born: British Guyana
- Occupation: Video artist
- Known for: Scratch video movement

George Barber is a British video artist.

== Early life and education ==
Barber was born and grew up in British Guyana, which he considers to be his most important education.

He received his BA in Sculpture 'A' (conceptual department) from St Martins School of Art in 1980 and his MA in Experimental Department from The Slade, in 1984.

== Art career ==
Barber first gained acclaim through his low-tech video pieces composed of found footage which he deconstructed in an effort to display them as contradicting their intended purposes, many of which become a 'deft reworking of cinematic narrative and cliché'. Barber rose to prominence with these works, establishing the Scratch-video movement in the 1980s. Many of Barber's Scratch works including Absence of Satan, 1985 and Yes Frank No Smoke, 1986 are seminal to the history of British video art.

In 1990s, Barber moved away from Scratch in his practice and created low-tech video works which became 'influential in defining the then emergent ‘slacker' aesthetic'. Barber's works became more varied in the later stages of his career as he shifted towards a more narrative style in monologue works such as Refusing Potatoes and I Was Once Involved in a Shit Show. With a focus on the narrative in his oeuvre, Barber sees 'himself, like Godard and Chris Marker, as a video-essayist'.

Engaging with current issues and debates in his work, The Freestone Drone, 2013 and Fences Make Senses, 2015 'Barber's way around art's potential political inefficacy' is to redefine the terms as to the artist, art is a reaction and reflection of the world and the effort to see this reality without veils is an achievement in itself as it allows room for rethinking with less bias and contemplation of a neutral alternative.

Barber has been part of numerous programmes at Tate Modern and had retrospectives at the ICA, New York Film & Video Festival and recently at La Rochelle Festival, France. In 2014 Barber took part at exhibition 'The Invisible Force Behind.' at Imai – inter media art institute within Quadriennale Düsseldorf. In 2015, the artist had three solo exhibitions at Chapter Arts Centre in Cardiff, Young Projects in Los Angeles and waterside contemporary in London.

In 2019, the British Film Institute added his work to the National Archive. In 2020, The LUX released his first feature film, The Mindset Suite. In 2021, he was nominated for the Derek Jarman Award. He also returned to his early roots making new purely visual works combining analogue and digital CGI, Video Marilyns Andy Never Thought of is the first result of this new direction. It has been released as a short video work and also auctioned as four separate NFTS by daata. In 2022, his latest project in production is Mind Wandering in a Van.

Barber is also Professor of Postgraduate Research at University for the Creative Arts.

== Awards ==
- 2008: Automotive Action Painting, First Prize, 24th Hamburg International Short Film Festival
- 2004: Walking Off Court, Grand Prix, Split Film & Video Festival
- 1998: 2CB CURTAIN TRIP, Gold Award, ARS ELECTRONICA, Austria
- 1990: Gold Award, ARS ELECTRONICA, Austria
- 1996: Award, Exploding Cinema Group

== Publications ==
- 1988: "Close-up: Nick Logan", Marxism Today, September
- 1984: "Looking at pop videos and thinking about other things", Journal of Art and Education

== Exhibitions and events ==
His works have been shown at international festivals, competitions, galleries and been broadcast on television throughout the world.
