= Karen Mirza and Brad Butler =

London-based artistic duo

Noor Afshan Mirza (previously known as Karen Mirza born 1970) and Brad Butler (born 1973) are a London-based artistic duo, working together since the late 1990s, after meeting as students at the Royal College of Art.

== Career ==
Mirza and Butler's artistic practice is research-based and multi-disciplinary. Coming from backgrounds in painting and anthropology respectively, their practice engages different forms of visual research in a dialogue that investigates the role of art and the artist in articulating the conditions of a postmodern and postcolonial world. This intention is reflected both in the range of media they use in presenting their process based works and in the varying roles they take on in instigating their artistic activities. Mirza and Butler's practice thus “consists of filmmaking, drawing, installation, photography, performance, publishing and curating.” In continuously shifting their roles as artistic mediators, they also call into question the role that is traditionally occupied by audiences as recipients of the works.

Mirza and Butler's most recent project is the ongoing Artangel commission, ‘The Museum of Non Participation’, which was “established to initiate and facilitate a dialogue addressing the derogatory western view of Pakistan through our media.” Mirza and Butler's strategy in coming to grips with this challenging venture was to organize an extensive program ranging from “workshops, residencies, interventions” to film and publications. “Purposely seeking a cross-section of the public in both countries to participate, The Museum’s reach is representative of a diversity of opinions, giving voice to unlikely combinations of individuals.”

Mirza and Butler have been active participants of the London art scene for over thirteen years and have been widely exhibited by leading art institutions around the world. Mirza and Butler have also formed no.w.here, a London-based, artist-run not-for-profit that “combines film production with critical dialogue about contemporary image making.”

Mirza and Butler were shortlisted for Artes Mundi 6 in 2014. for their work 'The Unreliable Narrator'.

They previously collaborated with waterside contemporary, London, Galeri NON, Istanbul, and are currently represented by Pi ARTWORKS.

== Solo Shows ==
2014

- Deep State, Galeri NON, Istanbul
- The Unreliable Narrator, waterside contemporary, London

2013

- The New Deal, Walker Art Center, Minneapolis

2012

- House of the Unexpected, curated by Haema Sivanesan, Blackwood Gallery, Toronto
- Deep State, waterside contemporary, London

2011

- The Daily Battle, VIVID, London

2009

- The Museum of Non Participation, Artangel, London

== Grants and awards ==
2014

- Artes Mundi 6 (shortlist), Cardiff, UK

2012

- Creative Capital, US
- Jarman Award (shortlist), UK

2010

- Festival Award winner, The 22nd Onion City Experimental Film and Video Festival, Chicago, US
- FLAMIN Productions (shortlist), London, UK

2009

- Transmediale Award (shortlist), Berlin, DE

2008

- Filmische Wahrheiten, Production Grant, The Museum of Contemporary Cinema Foundation, Madrid, ES
- Film London Grant, London, UK

2007

London Artists’ Film and Video Awards (LAFVA), London, UK
