= Oreet Ashery =

British artist

- Born: 1966 (age 59–60); Jerusalem, Israel
- Education: Sheffield Hallam University, Central Saint Martins, (Reading School of Art, PhD)

Oreet Ashery (Hebrew: אורת אשרי; born 1966 in Jerusalem, Israel) is an interdisciplinary artist based in London.

== Career ==
Ashery received her BA (distinction) in Fine Art from Sheffield Hallam University in 1992, followed by her MA in Fine Arts from Central Saint Martins in 2000. Her work explores ideological, social and gender constructions through an interdisciplinary practice, spanning installation, video, live art, and 2-D image making.

Ashery's earlier work was often produced as a male character of her own creation, exploring gender relationships and those between woman and cultural identity. As part of her family history, Ashery's most consistent character is Marcus Fisher, was an orthodox Jewish man found in works such as Dancing with Men and Marcus Fisher | Say Cheese,

Ashery's more recent work has been based on Mayakovsky's 1921 play Mystery-Bouffe. This work confronts social and class biases alongside issues of political power and agency. Her performance at the Tate Modern The World is Flooding in 2014 was followed by an exhibition Animal with a Language at Waterside Contemporary, both of which saw Ashery work with participants from Freedom from Torture, UK Lesbian and Gay Immigration Group, Portugal Prints, and others, to explore these themes.

Ashery has exhibited and performed at various international venues, such as ZKM, Karlsruhe; Haus der Kulturen der Welt, Berlin; Brooklyn Museum, New York; Overgaden, Copenhagen; DEPO, Istanbul; Whitstable Biennale; Centre Pompidou, Paris; Auto Italia South East, London; Freud Museum, London and Wellcome Collection, London producing works that explore her personal politics and identity in relation to wider social and cultural contexts. Her work is included in the permanent collections of the MAG Collection at the Ferens Gallery and the Tate.

In 2020 Ashery was awarded a one-off Turner bursary of £10,000. These were awarded to ten artists instead of the usual Turner Prize, which was delayed because of the coronavirus pandemic. She was selected for her contribution to Misbehaving Bodies: Jo Spence and Oreet Ashery at the Wellcome Collection, which explored lived experiences of care and chronic illness. The jury were particularly moved by her new film Dying Under Your Eyes and the innovative web series Revisiting Genesis following two nurses who assist people actively preparing for death to create biographical slideshows serving as their posthumous digital legacy.

== Awards ==
- 2020 Turner bursary
- 2017 Winner, The Jarman Award
- 2014 Fine Art Fellowship, Stanley Picker Fellowship
- 2013–2015 Visiting Professor, Royal College of Art, Painting Department
- 2011–2014 Honorary Research Fellow, School of English and Drama, Queen Mary University of London
- 2007–2010 Arts and Humanities Research Council Creative Research Fellow, Drama Department, Queen Mary University of London

== Solo exhibitions ==
2019-2020

- Misbehaving Bodies: Jo Spence and Oreet Ashery. Wellcome Collection, London, UK

2017-2018

- Revisiting Genesis. 6th Thessaloniki Biennale of Contemporary Art

2016

- Revisiting Genesis. Stanley Picker Gallery, Kingston, UK
- Revisiting Genesis. Tyneside Cinema, UK

2015

- Oreet Ashery. Revisiting Genesis, fig-2, ICA, London, UK
- Animal with a Language. Campagne Prèmiere, Berlin, Germany

2014

- Animal with a Language. Waterside Contemporary, London, UK

2013

- Party for Freedom. Hippolythe, Helsinki, Finland
- Party for Freedom. Overgaden, Copenhagen, Denmark

2012

- Monkey Bum Prints Factory. Pristine Gallery, Mexico
- Oreet Ashery, with Nicole Ahland. C. Wichtendahl. Galerie, 5th European Month of Photography, Berlin, Germany

2011

- Falafel Road, with Larissa Sansour. DEPO, Istanbul, Turkey

2010

- The Beautiful Jew. Other Gallery, Shanghai, China
- Raging Balls. Other Gallery, Beijing, China

2009

- Back in 5 Minutes and Scratch Performance: Golani Varanasi. The Arches, Glasgow, UK

2008

- Dancing with Men. Sherwell Centre, Plymouth University, Plymouth, UK

2007

- What You See, Letchworth Art Centre Gallery, Letchworth, UK

2003

- Performance 2003. Foxy Production Gallery, New York, US
- Say Cheese. Bluecoat Arts Centre, Liverpool, UK

2002

- Oreet Ashery. Foxy Production Gallery, New York, US
- 7 Acts of Love. Kapelica Gallery, Ljubljana, Slovenia
- 7 Acts of Love. Stil und Bruch, Berlin, Germany

1998

- Magnum Opus III, with Daniel Rubinstein. Jerusalem Artists’ House Gallery, Jerusalem, Israel

1996

- Magnum Opus II, with Daniel Rubinstein. 68elf Gallery, Cologne, Germany
