= Home for the Weekend =

2012 film

- Directed by: Hans-Christian Schmid
- Written by: Bernd Lange
- Starring: Lars Eidinger
- Cinematography: Bogumil Godfrejow
- Release dates: 14 February 2012 (Berlin); 6 September 2012 (Germany)
- Running time: 85 minutes
- Country: Germany
- Language: German

Home for the Weekend (German: Was bleibt) is a 2012 German drama film directed by Hans-Christian Schmid. The film competed in competition at the 62nd Berlin International Film Festival in February 2012.

== Plot ==
Gitte and Günter are in the publishing business and live a bourgeois lifestyle. They have two sons in mid-thirties, Marko a writer who is struggling with family life and Jakob a dentist who has started private clinic and is losing money. They both are called down for a visit for celebrating their retirement from the publishing business. Gitte who has clinical depression, announces her decision to go off her medication after a brief period of Homeopathy and Traditional Chinese medicine. The family gets upset by the decision which further throws off Gitte. Gitte who seemingly seems to be in control is faced with an unsupportive family who isn't ready to accept her as a person than a patient. Gitte and Günter believed their children were doing good, and the sons believed their parents family life was going smooth. But a series of revelations tip the family's structure out of balance. This triggers reserved reactions in the family, and Gitte disappears into a forest, Jakob moves out to Sweden for better career opportunities, Marko finds peace with his wife and Günter prepares to fly to Jordan with his long-time lover Susanne.

== Cast ==
- Lars Eidinger as Marko Heidtmann
- Corinna Harfouch as Gitte Heidtmann
- Sebastian Zimmler as Jakob Heidtmann
- Ernst Stötzner as Günter Heidtmann
