= Bi/Mental =

Studio album by Le Butcherettes
- Released: February 1, 2019
- Genre: Garage rock, punk rock, garage punk, indie rock, art punk
- Length: 49:13
- Label: Rise
- Producer: Jerry Harrison

Le Butcherettes chronology
A Raw Youth (2015)	Bi/Mental (2019)

Singles from Le Butcherettes
- 1. "spider/WAVES" Released: 6 April 2018; 2. "struggle/STRUGGLE" Released: 11 May 2018

Professional ratings
Review scores
Source	Rating
AllMusic	4/5 stars
Drowned in Sound	9/10
Hysteria Mag	9/10
Slug Mag	favorable

Bi/Mental (stylized as bi/MENTAL) is the fourth studio album by Mexican-American band Le Butcherettes, and is the band's label debut for Rise Records. The album's lyrics address personal themes, such as mental illness, and is strongly inspired by the band's family and domestic circumstances, particularly that of frontwoman Teri Gender Bender. The album was released upwards of three years and four months after its predecessor A Raw Youth, marking the band's longest gap between the release of full-length albums.

== Background ==
Essentially, this record was inspired by the death of a living mother but none of that matters anymore. A disconnection in itself is so ravage so confusing it leaves one feeling incomplete… is there hope? Is there light? Maybe it all isn't so black and white. in the end there is a Duality in All. Life is a cycle, the moon, the sun, the ocean waves transcending into sand. It will be okay.

– Teri Gender Bender

Much of the material was inspired by Teri Gender Bender's relationship with her mother, who was previously living with her in El Paso. According to an interview The Guardian, Teri and her mother had not spoken for over a year after a violent domestic dispute. Teri's mother had since been diagnosed with bipolar disorder.

The album's title and songs discard conventional English and Spanish grammar standards, instead favoring a fully-lowercased first word, followed by a slash, with all preceding words in full capitals. In contrast, the concluding track, whose title is one word long, is stylized as "/BREATH", placing its only word in full capitals after the slash. All songs are sung in English, except for "la/SANDÍA", which is in Spanish and features vocals from Chilean pop musician Mon Laferte.

On the album cover and layout, and in many of the respective music videos, Teri Gender Bender poses in traditional warring garb of the Chichimeca peoples, in honor of her grandmother.

== Release and promotion ==
On April 6, 2018, a music video for "spider/WAVES" was released, serving as the band's first released material after having signed to Rise Records

On May 11, 2018, an flexi disc EP titled struggle/STRUGGLE (bi) was released, which featured three versions of the titular song.

During this promotion cycle, the band played eight dates with Hot Snakes in May 2018, a solitary show at the Taste of Chicago in Chicago on July 14, and seven dates with the Flaming Lips in August 2018.

The band posted via Youtube a live video for "father/ELOHIM" on November 26, 2018.

On February 1, 2019, the album was released in CD format and digital download, alongside a run of 350 vinyl colored in a gold and mustard swirl. On the same day of album release, a video of the song "give/UP" was also released. The video prominently features the band, as a trio, performing in a warehouse, alongside a mannequin with a bass guitar propped in its arms. The video briefly visualizes Gender Bender in a desert environment, visually contrasting with the sun and holding an umbrella.

Between February 2 and March 8, 2019, Le Butcherettes went on a 24-date North American tour in support of the album, beginning in Mexico City and ending in Houston. Alongside Le Butcherettes on this tour were Los Angeles rock band Stars at Night and Mexican electronic musician Renee Mooi. Teri Gender Bender had collaborated with Mooi on the title track of Mooi's album Beetle, also released in 2019.

On April 1, 2019, two months after the album's release, Le Butcherettes released a music video for "in/THE END", directed by Gus Black.

== Track listing ==
No.	Title	Length
1.	"spider/WAVES" (featuring Jello Biafra)	5:48
2.	"give/UP"	3:40
3.	"strong/ENOUGH"	4:20
4.	"father/ELOHIM"	2:19
5.	"little/MOUSE"	3:11
6.	"in/THE END"	3:46
7.	"nothing/BUT TROUBLE"	3:49
8.	"la/SANDÍA" (featuring Mon Laferte)	2:44
9.	"struggle/STRUGGLE"	4:14
10.	"dressed/IN A MATTER OF SPEECH"	4:32
11.	"mother/HOLDS" (featuring Alice Bag)	3:46
12.	"sand/MAN"	3:41
13.	"/BREATH"	3:25

== Credits ==
=== Personnel ===
- Teri Gender Bender – vocals, guitars, keyboards, writing
- Riko Rodríguez-López – guitar, synths
- Marfred Rodríguez-López – bass
- Alejandra Robles Luna – drums

=== Guests ===
- Jello Biafra – spoken word on "spider/WAVES"
- Mon Laferte – vocals on "la/SANDÍA"
- Alice Bag – vocals on "mother/HOLDS"

=== Additional personnel ===
- Chris Common – mixing, mastering, engineering
- Robert Cheek – engineering
- John Debaun – engineering
- Eric Thorngren – engineering
- Lindsey Byrnes – cover and band photography
- Alan Ashcraft – art direction, design and layout
- Kevin Moore – design and layout
