= Technoself (album) =

Studio album by Deantoni Parks
- Released: December 4, 2015
- Length: 43:15
- Label: Leaving, Stones Throw
- Producer: Deantoni Parks

Deantoni Parks chronology
| Touch But Don't Look (2012) | Technoself (2015) | Wally (2016) |

Professional ratings
Review scores
| Source | Rating |
|---|---|
| Pitchfork | 7.2/10 |
| Exclaim! | 8/10 |

Technoself is a second solo album by Deantoni Parks. It was released on December 5, 2015 by Leaving and Stones Throw. Three of the eleven songs were recorded live for Dublab, the rest was recorded in a studio. All of the songs were recorded live without any loops nor overdubs. Parks said: "I wanted to make music that happens in the time of thought." He also said that John Cale, his longtime collaborator, was the biggest influence on the album.

== Track listing ==
1. "Black Axioms" – 6:14
2. "Our Shadows" – 2:42
3. "Down" (samples "Fire and Rain" by James Taylor) – 2:54
4. "Graphite" (samples "Paranoid" by Black Sabbath) – 2:58
5. "Ashes" – 4:21
6. "Methodist" – 4:29
7. "Automatic" – 2:33
8. "Pebble" – 3:10
9. "Fosse in the Grass" – 4:46
10. "Bombay" – 3:28
11. "Orbis Magnus" – 4:26
