= Bosnian Rainbows =

American rock band (2012–2013)

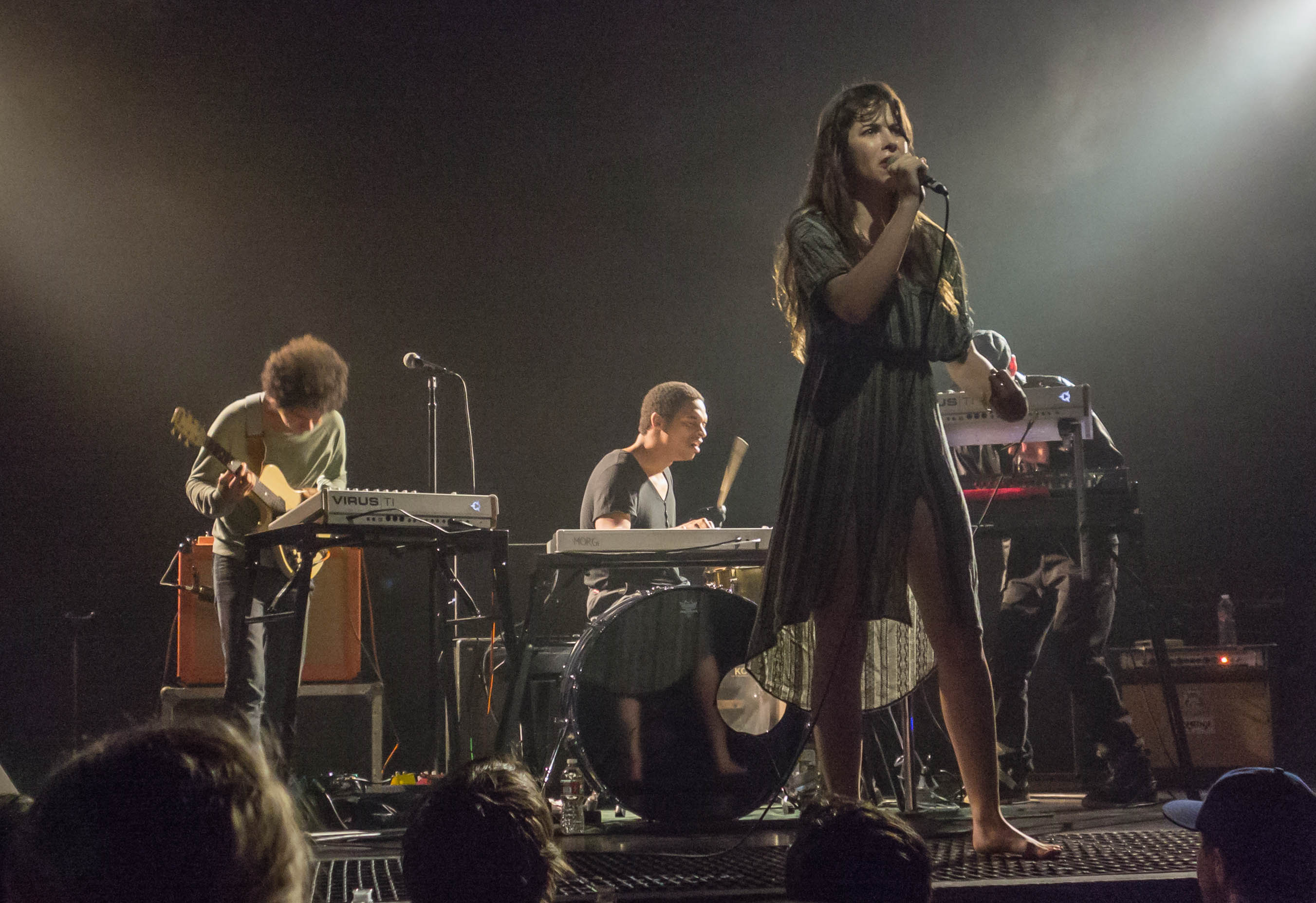
- Bosnian Rainbows in 2012 at The Triple Door

Background information
- Origin: El Paso, Texas
- Genres: Alternative rock; art rock; electronic rock; experimental rock; indie rock
- Years active: 2012–2013
- Labels: Sargent House; Rodriguez-Lopez Productions; Clouds Hil
- Past members: Omar Rodríguez-López; Teri Gender Bender; Deantoni Parks; Nicci Kasper
- Website: Bosnian Rainbows

Bosnian Rainbows was an American rock band from El Paso, Texas, formed in 2012. It consists of former the Mars Volta members Omar Rodríguez-López (guitar, backing vocals) and Deantoni Parks (drums, keyboards), alongside Le Butcherettes vocalist Teri Gender Bender and Nicci Kasper of KUDU and We Are Dark Angels (keyboards).

Initially billed as a variation on the Omar Rodriguez Lopez Group, the band was formed following a decision to put Rodriguez-Lopez's primary project, The Mars Volta, on hiatus.

== History ==
In March 2012, The Mars Volta released its sixth studio album, Noctourniquet, following a three-year recording period. Only 19 tour dates were announced in support of the release, of which 18 were in Europe and one in Israel. Following the tour, Rodríguez-López moved back to his home town of El Paso, Texas, and subsequently formed Bosnian Rainbows with frequent collaborator Teri Gender Bender of Le Butcherettes, Mars Volta drummer Deantoni Parks and Nicci Kasper, who previously worked with Parks in Kudu and also as the writing duo Dark Angels. Regarding the band's conception, Rodríguez-López noted, "I found myself lonely and bored. So it's like, 'OK, new phase — let's get into it and let's create a dialogue. Let's find some things out.'"

Rodríguez-López subsequently put The Mars Volta on hiatus (although the band dissolved four months later) in order to focus on a more democratic project, stating, "It’s a band — that's something I haven’t been in for over eleven years. [...] [The Mars Volta] was my baby: I started the group; I named it; booked all our tours — it became known as my family, not my band. I had to be in control of everything and I was really fucking domineering with everybody, not just musicians." Rodríguez-López elaborated, "Doing films has taught me to be a collaborator, since it’s such a large medium, you couldn't do it on your own if you tried, you know? And also hanging out with all my friends, Jim and Tony and Paul, the At the Drive-In guys, and being in that headspace again, life puts you exactly where you need to be. You can try and pull away from it, but it will always remind you where your path is."

In September 2012, Bosnian Rainbows embarked upon its first tour under the banner of the Omar Rodriguez Lopez Group, with Rodríguez-López noting, "The tour was booked five months before it happened, and it was going to be another solo tour, and then at some point, I decided to start a new group and have a team effort. So it got booked one way, but I try to make it clear every night that this is a new group, and these are the names of the players, and 'thank you.'" The band rehearsed in Hamburg at Clouds Hill Studios, owned by Rodriguez-Lopez's longtime friend Johann Scheerer. During the rehearsals Bosnian Rainbows recorded a live session, which was released on 10" vinyl and DVD as a part of Live at Clouds Hill limited-edition box set in December 2012. After the European leg of the tour they returned to the studio to record their self-titled debut album, with production by Scheerer.

Rodríguez-López noted, "These are very much shorter, more to-the-point songs [than The Mars Volta's]. They still have spaces that stretch out, but what I mean to say is that it’s all the same influences that have been in most of my writing and all the people in my bands’ writing. Can is there, Siouxsie and the Banshees is there, Gang of Four is there, all the Led Zeppelin, whatever... all those things are there, it's just different elements of those things. You make it shorter. It's stripped down, it's starker. The very melodic side of Can; the very textural side of Siouxsie. You take all those elements, and you take elements that maybe you weren't exploring as much before.

On January 23, 2013, the band released their first single, "Torn Maps", on SoundCloud. Later, the song was released as a digital single on the band's Bandcamp page. On February 12, 2013, the second studio track, "Turtle Neck," was released on the band's SoundCloud and bandcamp pages. The debut self-titled album by Bosnian Rainbows was released worldwide via Clouds Hill Ltd on June 25, 2013.

Bosnian Rainbows reportedly recorded their second album in 2013 with producer Rafa Arcaute. However, the band went inactive in 2014, as Rodriguez-Lopez reunited with his Mars Volta partner Cedric Bixler-Zavala in a new project, Antemasque. The second Bosnian Rainbows album remains unreleased.

== Line-up ==
- Teri Gender Bender - lead vocals
- Omar Rodríguez-López - guitar, backing vocals, keyboards
- Deantoni Parks - drums, keyboards
- Nicci Kasper - synths, keyboards

== Discography ==
=== Studio albums ===
- Bosnian Rainbows (June 25, 2013)

=== Singles ===
- "Torn Maps" (2013)
- "Turtle Neck" (2013)
- "Morning Sickness" (2013)

=== Other ===
- Bosnian Rainbows Live at Clouds Hill (2012; part of Live at Clouds Hill box set)
