= Scratch video =

1980s British video art movement

Scratch video was a British video art movement that emerged in the early to mid-1980s. It was characterised by the use of found footage, fast cutting, and multi-layered rhythms. As a form of outsider art, it challenged many of the establishment assumptions of broadcast television, as well as those of gallery-bound video art.

== Background ==
Scratch video arose in opposition to broadcast television, as (anti-)artists attempted to deal critically and directly with the impact of mass communications. The videos critiqued the institutions producing broadcast television and the commercialism of youth television, especially MTV, through their form, content, and modes of distribution.

Much of the work was politically radical, often containing images of a sexual or violent nature, and using images appropriated from mainstream media, including corporate advertising; using strategies inspired by the Situationist concept of detournement and William S. Burroughs' theories of Electronic Revolution.

== Context ==
The primary audience for scratch video in the early to mid-1980s was in nightclub performances by industrial music bands such as The Anti-Group, Cabaret Voltaire, Nocturnal Emissions, Psychic TV, SPK, Test Dept, and Autopsia. Some of those involved described their work as a form of cultural terrorism or as a form of anti-art.

In the mid-1980s typical London venues would be screenings at artist-run spaces such as the Ambulance Station, in independent cinemas such as the Brixton Ritzy Cinema, or the Fridge nightclub, which boasted an array of dozens of recycled colour televisions. There was also significant distribution on VHS tape, following similar networks to cassette culture.

After Andy Lipman's City Limits feature contextualised the art values of this practice, material began to be featured in small screenings in official art galleries such as the ICA and Tate. Television stations, like Channel 4 began late night screenings of art videos, including scratch video. However, because much of the material was constructed using domestic VHS equipment, it was deemed both technically and legally unsuitable for broadcast (for fear of breaching copyright law). Being highly politicised, some of the material also broke with the broadcaster's criteria of balance.

== Artists ==
- Emergency Broadcast Network
- George Barber
- Cabaret Voltaire
- Gorilla Tapes
- Sandra Goldbacher
- Richard Heslop
- Nocturnal Emissions
- Psychic TV
- Systaime

== History ==
Scratch video is a rather catch-all category of work which derive from popular dance and music fashions and the cutting of found trash images with it. Its long history begins with the cubist collages of Picasso and Braque, the 'ready-mades' of Duchamp, and passes through Joseph Cornell, Bruce Conner, Andy Warhol and William S. Burroughs and Anthony Balch cut-ups. The movement was influenced by the American video artist Dara Birnbaum.

Speaking of the movement's emergence and how it got its name, Rik Lander (one half of the Duvet Brothers) has stated:

I can't remember when we found out what we were doing was scratch or that we were part of a movement. Certainly when we saw the work of Kim Flitcroft and Sandra Goldbacher, George Barber and Gorilla Tapes it was uncanny that so many people had been experimenting in the same area without knowing that the others existed. In my mind a journalist called Pat Sweeney came up with the name Scratch, but Scratch Video may have already existed as a named form in the US. Andy Lipman ran a City Limits cover story on Scratch Video in October 1984 where he tried to create the myth that Scratch was made by disaffected youth taping the TV and reediting it on VCRs at home. If anyone knew this was not the case it was Andy. He was one of the few people who had actually met all the people involved. Dessa Fox in the NME tried a similar hype when she suggested that Scratch Video was a televisual punk rock".

Original scratch video works continue to be shown in major exhibitions around the world. Notable events, amongst others, being Gorilla Tapes' participation in the ICA's 2007 exhibition The Secret Public: The Last Days of the British Underground 1978-1988 and SCRATCH! a 2008 retrospective exhibition curated by Paul Pieroni at the Seventeen gallery in London.

== See also ==
- Culture jamming
- Plagiarism
- Remix culture
- VJing
- Social effects of television
