= Video scratching =

Video editing technique

Video scratching is a video editing technique used within the music industry. It is a variation of the audio editing technique scratching.

It is typically used in either music videos or live performances, with one or more individuals manipulating a video sample to make it follow the rhythm of whatever music is playing.

== History ==
Academy Award winning filmmaker Zbigniew Rybczyński used the technique in the 1984 music video for "Close (to the Edit)" by The Art of Noise. The video would go on to win two 1985 MTV Video Music Awards: Best Editing and Most Experimental Video.

The British art collective Gorilla Tapes, comprising Gavin Hodge, Tim Morrison and Jon Dovey, developed a body of scratch video art work, also to much critical acclaim, during the early to mid-1980s. Their seminal 1984 work Death Valley Days reflects upon the stifling atmosphere of the Cold War years and has been exhibited at a number of prestigious venues including Tate Britain where one of the video's fours sections entitled Commander in Chief was included in the 2003 Tate exhibition A Century of Artists Film in Britain.

Kutiman became famous for video scratching with his work using YouTube videos in 2009.

== See also ==
- VJing
- Culture jamming
- Remix culture
