= Gorilla Tapes =

British scratch video artist group

Gorilla Tapes was the collective name of British Scratch Video artists Jon Dovey (b 1955), Gavin Hodge (b 1954) and Tim Morrison (b. 1955). 'Scratch' is the art of 'sampling' and repeating found images and sounds, thereby making a new work. With simple video editing equipment and images recorded from television, during the mid-1980s Gorilla Tapes made sharp satirical and political videos collaged from old film footage and the TV news imagery of the mid-Thatcher years. Gorilla Tapes have exhibited internationally in solo and group exhibitions. Highlights include participation in Tate Britain's A Century of Artists Films (2003).

Gorilla Tapes was founded in 1984 by Gavin Hodge, Tim Morrison, Jon Dovey and Jean McClements, to develop innovative approaches to the artistic use of Video in entertainment, documentary and dramatics forms. Works include corporate and educational videos, magazine strands, drama, arts, documentary and entertainment programmes for the BBC, ITV, Sony, Channel Four, The British Film Institute and the former Greater London Council. Gorilla Tapes is also involved in lecturing and running workshops in editing technique, copyright, video production and writing.

== Works ==
1984 Death Valley Days
1985 Lo Pay, No Way!
1987 The Media Show
1987 Invisible Television 1989 Bilderwerk I
1990 Bilderwerk II
1991 Zygosis “John Heartfield and the Political Image”

- Grand Prix Best Short Film, 33rd Bilbao International Film Festival, 1991.
- Silver Hugo Award, Chicago International Film Festival, 1991.
- Best TV Documentary Prize, Cadiz International Video Festival, 1991,
- Red Riband, American Film Institute Festival, 1992.

== See also ==
- Scratch Video
