= Hans-Christian Schmid =

German film director and screenwriter (born 1965)

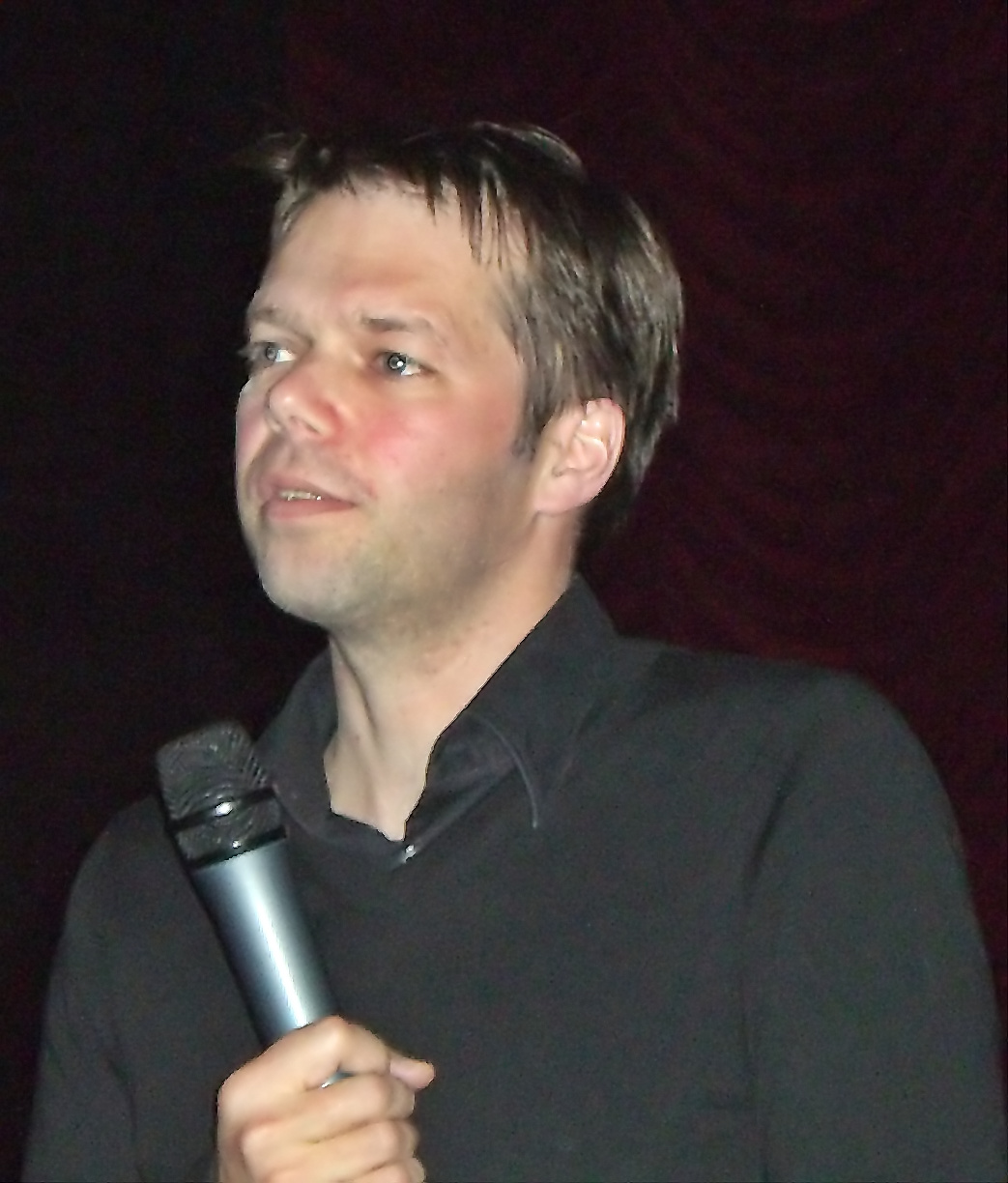
- Schmid at the Gartenbaukino in Vienna, 2007
- Born: 19 August 1965 (age 59); Altötting, West Germany
- Occupation(s): Director; Screenwriter

Hans-Christian Schmid (born 1965) is a German film director and screenwriter.

== Life and work ==
Hans-Christian Schmid has collaborated with Michael Gutmann on several of the movies that he directed. Gutmann wrote screenplays for 23 — Nichts ist so wie es scheint (1998), and Crazy (2000). Gutmann also directed Heart Over Head (2001) for which he and Schmid wrote the screenplay.

== Awards ==
- 1995: Findling Award for Heaven and Hell
- 2003: Bavarian Film Award, Best Screenplay
- 2003: Findling Award for Distant Lights

== Filmography ==
- Sekt oder Selters (1989)
- Die Mechanik des Wunders (1992)
- Heaven and Hell (Himmel und Hölle, 1994)
- After Five in the Forest Primeval (Nach Fünf im Urwald, 1995)
- 23 — Nichts ist so wie es scheint (1998)
- Crazy (2000)
- Distant Lights (Lichter, 2003)
- Requiem (2006)
- Storm (Sturm, 2009)
- Home for the Weekend (Was bleibt, 2012)
- Das Verschwinden (2016/17)
- We Are Next of Kin (2022)
