= Le Butcherettes =

Mexican rock band

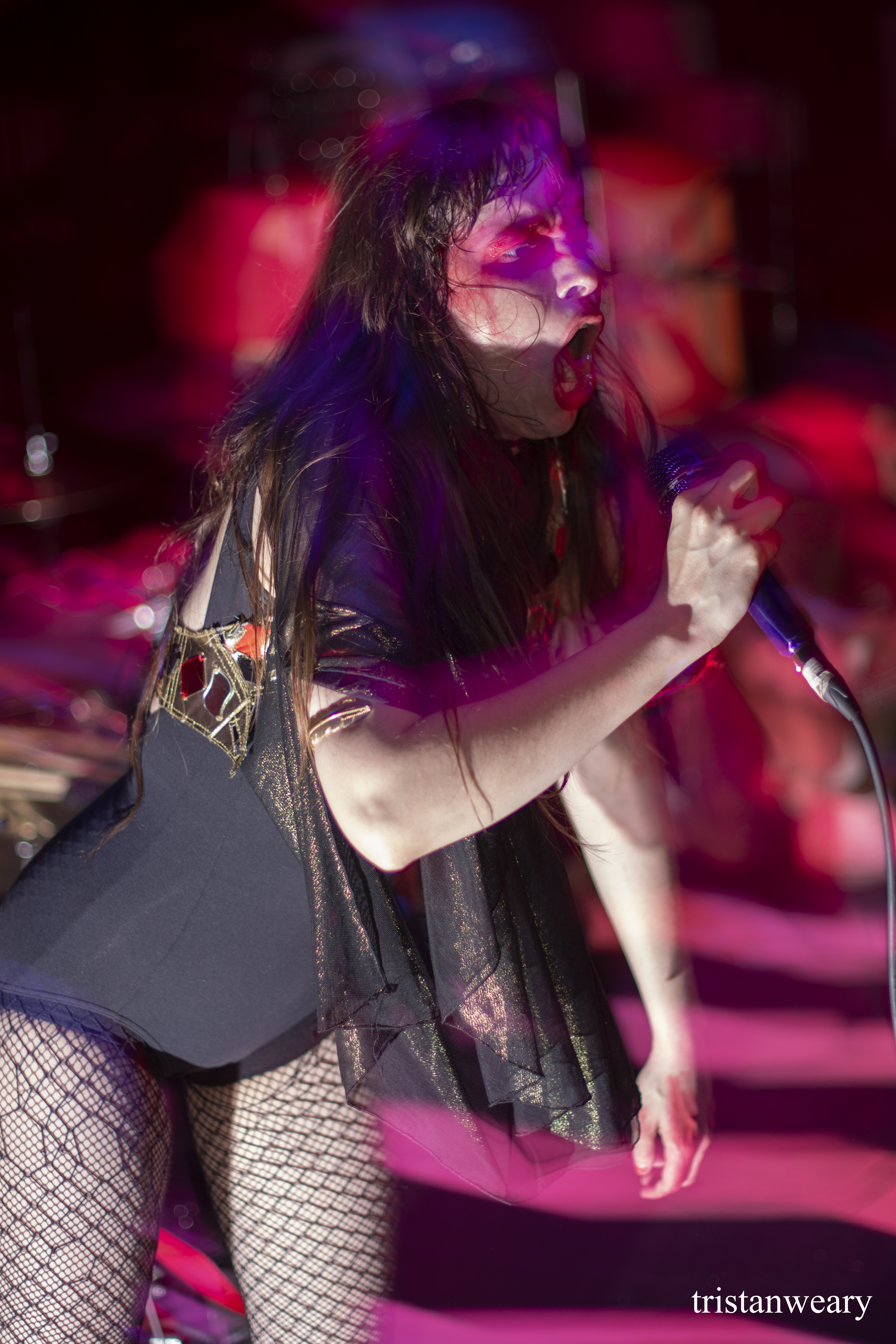
- Teri of Le Butcherettes

Background information
- Origin: Guadalajara, Jalisco, Mexico
- Genres: Punk rock, garage rock, garage punk
- Years active: 2007–present
- Labels: Rise Records
- Members: Teri Gender Bender; Alejandra Robles Luna; Riko Rodríguez-López; Marfred Rodríguez-López
- Past members: Auryn Jolene; Normandi Heuxdaflo; Jonathan Hischke; Gabe Serbian; Omar Rodríguez-López; Lia Braswell; Jamie Aaron Aux; Chris Common; Carlos Om
- Website: Le Butcherettes' Official site

Le Butcherettes is a Mexican garage punk band formed in 2007 in Guadalajara by Teri Gender Bender.

== History ==
Le Butcherettes was created by vocalist/guitarist Teri Gender Bender, who later recruited drummer Auryn Jolene to form a duo. Their live act, featuring 1950s fashions and props such as brooms, feather dusters, and bloody aprons to refer to women being slaves, quickly achieved acclaim in the Mexican underground scene. Teri Gender Bender would also use artificial blood, flour, eggs, meat, and a real pig head on stage.

The band won "Best New Artist" and "Best Punk Record" in the Indie-O Awards 2009. A disagreement on direction led Auryn Jolene to abruptly leave and claim the end of the band, leading to media confusion. Teri Gender Bender later denied this. Gender Bender moved the band to Los Angeles and recruited drummer Normandi Heuxdalfo. Notable 2009 appearances include Hellow Fest in Monterrey and opening for The Dead Weather in their Mexico City and Guadalajara shows. In January 2010, Le Butcherettes opened for the Yeah Yeah Yeahs at shows in Monterrey, Guadalajara and Mexico City.

Omar Rodríguez-López of The Mars Volta produced (as well as contributed bass guitar to) Le Butcherettes' LP Sin Sin Sin. The first single, "Henry Don't Got Love", was released in 2010 as a free download from Le Butcherettes' Bandcamp page. The album was released in May 2011 on Rodríguez-López's label.

Le Butcherettes toured the U.S. with Deftones and The Dillinger Escape Plan with the new line-up of Teri, drummer Gabe Serbian (of The Locust) and bassist Jonathan Hischke; Le Butcherettes later played support for Queens of the Stone Age.

They toured Europe with The Mars Volta and North America with Rodríguez-López's new project Antemasque in 2014 and 2015. The record Cry Is for the Flies was released in America by Ipecac Recordings, and gained a further following with extensive touring with the Melvins.

In June 2015 the band announced that their album A Raw Youth would be released September 18, 2015 and produced by Omar Rodríguez-López; it has guest appearances from John Frusciante and Iggy Pop.

Between August and September 2017, the band posted several photos on social media featuring the recording sessions for a new album, somewhere in Northern California. This was later confirmed to have taken place in Stinson Beach. The new album was expected to be released in October 2018, but was eventually released on February 1, 2019, titled bi/MENTAL.

In 2018 the band appeared as a part of the Flaming Lips North America tour. Le Butcherettes also guested on the Adult Swim television series FishCenter Live. In 2019 the band played shows with L7 On a North American tour, as well as a show with Bikini Kill. In 2019, Le Butcherettes, along with Devil Makes Three, toured on Social Distortion's and Flogging Molly's fall tour.

During the COVID-19 pandemic, Teri Gender Bender started sorting hard drives containing her early recordings. She then explained to the band her need to re-record many of these tracks as a solo artist, but assured them that Le Butcherettes was far from done.

== Band members ==
Current members

- Teri Gender Bender – vocals, guitars, keyboards (2007–present)
- Riko Rodríguez-López – bass (2015–2017), guitars, synths (2016–present), trumpet on "Your Weakness Gives Me Life" (2014)
- Alejandra Robles Luna – drums (2016–present)
- Marfred Rodríguez-López – bass (2017–present)

Former members

- Auryn Jolene – drums (2007–2009)
- Normandi Heuxdaflo – drums (2009–2010)
- Gustavo Limon – bass (2009–2010)
- Carlos Om – bass (2010)
- Jonathan Hischke – bass (2011)
- Gabe Serbian – drums (2011; died 2022)
- Omar Rodríguez-López – bass (2011–2013), production
- Lia Braswell – drums (2011–2014)
- Chris Common – bass (2014), drums (2015–2016, 2017)
- Jamie Aaron Aux – bass, backing vocals (2015)

Timeline

== Discography ==
Albums

- Sin Sin Sin (May 10, 2011)
- Cry Is for the Flies (May 15, 2014)
- A Raw Youth (September 18, 2015)
- bi/MENTAL (February 1, 2019)

Singles and EPs

- Kiss & Kill EP (2008)
- iTunes Live: SXSW EP (2011)
- Chaos as Usual (split with Melvins) EP (2015)
- "Shave the Pride" 7" (2015)
- House Hunter flexi-disc (2016)
- spider/WAVES (2018)
- struggle/STRUGGLE flexi-disc (2018)
- Don't Bleed (February 14, 2020)

Downloads

- "Sólo Soy Pueblo (Llanto)" (2015)
- "My Mother Holds My Only Life Line" (2016)
