= Clinton Welander =

American audio recording and mixing engineer

- Born: September 19, 1982 (age 43)
- Education: University of Iowa
- Occupation: Audio engineer

Clinton (Clint) Welander (born September 19, 1982) is a Grammy Award–winning audio recording and mixing engineer based in Los Angeles, California.

Raised in Emmetsburg, Iowa, Welander moved to Los Angeles after graduating from the University of Iowa and then Conservatory of Recording Arts and Sciences. He immediately began working at Sunset Sound Recorders and partner studio The Sound Factory, and has since been involved with many other projects at studios in Los Angeles. In 2012, Clint received a Grammy Award for engineering Jimmy Cliff's Rebirth album. Clint continues to engineer and mix album projects and is also an active recordist and score mixer for TV and Film. More information about his work at www.clintwelander.com A full credits list can be found here.
