= Johann Scheerer =

German musician and music producer

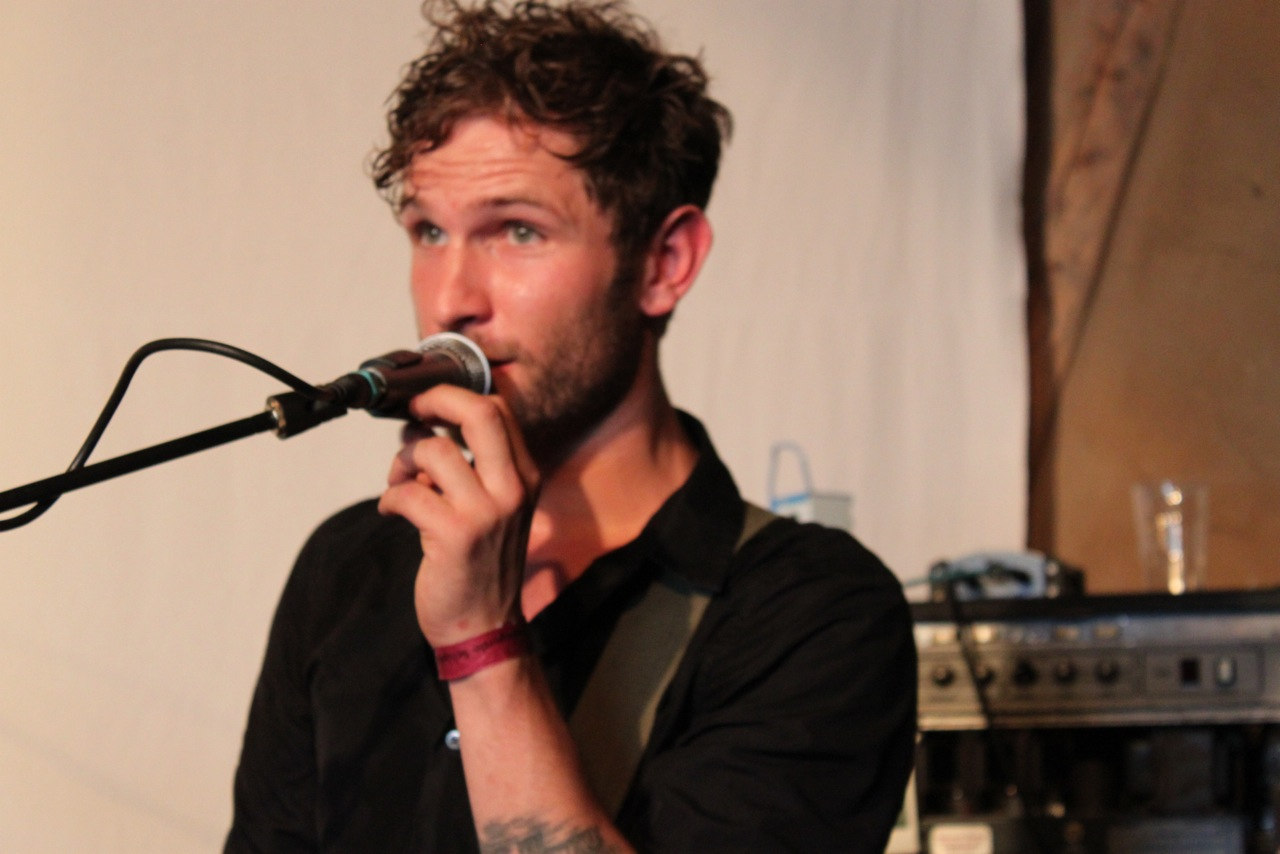
- Born: Johann Wilhelm Karl Jakob Scheerer; 6 November 1982; Henstedt-Ulzburg
- Occupations: musician, music producer and author

Johann Wilhelm Karl Jakob Scheerer (6 November 1982 in Henstedt-Ulzburg) is a German musician and music producer based in Hamburg. He is known for his production of bands like Bosnian Rainbows, Peter Doherty, Omar Rodríguez-López, Faust or Gallon Drunk.

== Biography ==
Johann Scheerer was born on 6 November 1982 to Jan Philipp Reemtsma and Ann-Kathrin Scheerer in Henstedt-Ulzburg, and grew up in Hamburg.

At 16, he won a talent contest with his school band "Am kahlen Aste". The prize was a meeting with the then successful music producers, Berman Brothers (producers) (Caught in the Act, Hanson). This was followed by a recording contract with Epic/Sony and the release of three singles and an album under the band name Score!. The band was not as successful as the record company had hoped, and the contract came to an end. The band subsequently split up some two years later.

As a free agent, Johann Scheerer took recording the band into his own hands. This led to the creation of the "Rekordbox" recording studio in two construction containers stacked on top of each other, located on land occupied by the Garten Art Network in Hamburg’s Eifflerstrasse.

In 2004, he moved with Henning Schmidt (Plemo) into the recording studio Phonraum in the building formerly occupied by the Tageszeitung in Chemnitzstrasse in Hamburg. Following numerous smaller and demo productions, he and Schmidt parted ways. In 2006, he began collaborating with Thies Mynther, opening the completely analogue Clouds Hill Recordings studio in Hamburg. National and international productions soon followed and in 2008, Chris von Rautenkranz decided to join Clouds Hill Recordings with the mastering for Soundgarden.

Later in 2008, Scheerer created the Taka-Takaz project. Twelve of his songs were recorded with musicians Omar Rodriguez Lopez (At The Drive-In, The Mars Volta), Marco Haas (T.Raumschmiere), Jessica Drosten (Das Bierbeben), Thies Mynther (Phantom/Ghost, Stella), Bubi Blacksmith (Zed Yago), Mense Reents (Die Vögel, Egoexpress, Die Goldenen Zitronen), Stella, Sebastian Nagel (Mocambo/The Ape) and Albrecht Schrader. The songs were released as two 10” EPs, Leslie White and Leslie Black.

Together with his fellow band member, Sebastian Nagel, Scheerer founded the 7” label Clouds Hill Ltd. in 2009, initially releasing 7” singles, recorded in Clouds Hill Recordings Studio and limited to production runs of 500. After the release of the Fukui album for Hamburg band Stella, and Beauty, from Freiburg band Kraków Loves Adana, the label established itself producing 10” EPs and 12” long players.

In 2010, Scheerer took Clouds Hill Ltd. to the internationally based Roughtrade Distribution. In the autumn of 2010, the band Stella reached 7th place in the German Club Charts (Deutschen Clubcharts – DCC) with the 12” remix “Office & Store”. The label received particular attention with its release of a 7” singles box, wrapped in sailcloth (2009), with a limited edition of 100, which sold out in less than 10 days and contained all the singles previously released by Clouds Hill Ltd. This was followed in 2011 by a 200 piece run of the “Analog Love in Digital Times” box, which included three 12” maxis and five 7” singles as well as a polaroid film and an original polaroid photo (in collaboration with Impossible).

The 2012 release of …live at Clouds Hill-Vinylbox sold out before its release, and featured seven artists who had played a concert at Clouds Hill Recordings. These included Faust & Omar Rodríguez López, Gallon Drunk, Bosnian Rainbows, The Ape and Léonore Boulanger.

His 2012 productions included the debut album of Berlin artists ALLIE and the first album for Omar Rodríguez López’s new band Bosnian Rainbows, which was released in May 2013 by Clouds Hill. In this year Scheerer also was executive producer of the “Los chidos” Movie, a Rodríguez López Production in association with Sargent House.

In 2014, he met Peter Doherty, who asked him to produce his solo album, and who later summarised their working together simply with “the guy saved my life”. The Scheerer label Clouds Hill released a limited 12” single which included an exclusive song from Peter Doherty and James Johnston for Record Store Day 2016.

In 2017, Scheerer released the Peter Doherty solo album he had produced, “Hamburg Demonstrations” through his label Clouds Hill, earning him a nomination for the Hamburg Music Prize “HANS” as best musician.

== Philosophy ==
In his productions, that range from pop to indie and on to avant-garde sound experiments, Scheerer strives for a sound that sets itself apart from the usual mainstream. He explains, “I always ask myself, what kind of mood, colour, depth do I want to create here? What kind of space do I want to see when I listen to this?”. His goal is to evoke emotions, without simply serving aesthetic expectations.

== Discography (selection) ==
1000 Robota: Hamburg brennt (EP), 2008; Du nicht, er nicht, sie nicht (LP), 2008; Rocko Schamoni & L'Orchestre Mirage: Die Vergessenen, 2015; Peter Doherty / James Johnston: Record Store Day 12", 2016; Peter Doherty: Hamburg Demonstrations, 2016; Taka-Takaz: Leslie White EP, 2008; Leslie Black EP, 2008; Karamel: Komm Besser Ins Haus, 2005; Tritt Kerben In den Asphalt, 2006; Schafft Eisland, 2007; Maschinen, 2009; ~ (Tilde), 2013; James Johnston: The Starless Room (2016)	Kraków Loves Adana: Beauty, 2010; Interview, 2012; Gallon Drunk: The Road Gets Darker From Here, 2012; The Soul Of The Hour, 2014; Faust: Something Dirty, 2011; Phantom/Ghost (Engineering/Mix): Thrown Out Of Drama School, 2009; The Process, 2009; Live At Clouds Hill, 2009; At the Drive-In: Diamanté EP 2018; Stella: Fukui, 2010; Office & Store, 2011; Anajo: Drei, 2011	Tonia Reeh: Boykiller, 2011; Fight of the stupid, 2013; Sion Hill: Elephant, 2017; The Ape: The Ape, 2008; Nothing But An Underapement, 2010; Fashion (EP), 2011; Dutch Uncles: Dutch Uncles, 2008; Frank Spilker (Co Produktion/Engineering): Mit All Den Leuten, 2010; Michaela Meise (Engineering/Mix): Preis Dem Todesüberwinder, 2011; Bosnian Rainbows: Bosnian Rainbows, 2013; Matija: Are We An Electric Generation Falling Apart? (2017)

== Publications ==
- Wir sind dann wohl die Angehörigen. Die Geschichte einer Entführung. Piper, München 2018, ISBN 978-3-492-05909-1.
- Unheimlich Nah. Piper, München 2021, ISBN 978-3-492-05915-2
