= Unlimited Love Tour =

2022–24 concert tour by the Red Hot Chili Peppers

- Tour by Red Hot Chili Peppers
- Promotional poster for the second North American leg
- Associated album: Unlimited Love; Return of the Dream Canteen
- Start date: June 4, 2022
- End date: July 30, 2024
- Legs: 11
- No. of shows: 28 in Europe; 69 in North America; 8 in Oceania; 5 in Asia; 9 in South America; 119 in total
- Box office: $390.8 million
- Website: redhotchilipeppers.com/tour/

Red Hot Chili Peppers concert chronology
- The Getaway World Tour (2016–2017); Unlimited Love Tour (2022–2024); ...

The Unlimited Love Tour was a concert tour by American rock band Red Hot Chili Peppers in support of the band's twelfth and thirteenth studio albums, Unlimited Love and Return of the Dream Canteen, which were released on April 1, 2022, and October 14, 2022, respectively. The tour was the band's first in five years and their first in fifteen years with guitarist John Frusciante, who returned to the band in 2019. The tour began in Seville, Spain, in June 2022 and concluded in July 2024 in Maryland Heights, Missouri.

The tour was the seventh highest-grossing of 2022, grossing $177 million. It is the band's highest-grossing tour to date, grossing almost $400 million in revenue.

The tour wrapped with over 3.4 million tickets sold, making it the third biggest rock tour of 2020s.

== Background and development ==
On September 24, 2021, the band announced that they would embark on a world tour in 2022, their first with John Frusciante since 2007 and that it would be in support of their as yet to be announced twelfth studio album. The band made the announcement in a YouTube video where they dressed as newscasters for a fictional news channel called KHOT News. Anthony Kiedis played a character called Johnson Hammerswaddle, Flea played Todd the Squirrel, while Chad Smith played weatherman Randy Raindrops. John Frusciante appeared as himself being interviewed by the other three band members. On October 7, 2021, the band released another KHOT News video, where they confirmed the first 32 dates for their Unlimited Love Tour which would see the band performing their first North American headlining stadium shows in their career. Presales for the shows began on October 9.

=== Pre-tour promotional shows and performances ===
On April 1, 2022, the release date for Unlimited Love, the Chili Peppers performed a surprise show at The Fonda Theatre in Los Angeles. It marked the band's first show since 2007 with the classic successful lineup of Flea, Kiedis, Smith, and Frusciante. (Note: The band's first show with Frusciante since 2007 was on February 8, 2020, at a memorial service for Andrew Burkle, a son of Ronald Burkle. Smith was absent, so he was filled in by Stephen Perkins of Jane's Addiction.) The show saw the live debuts of "Here Ever After", "Aquatic Mouth Dance" and "Not the One" from Unlimited Love and George Clinton joined the band for "Give It Away". On the same day, the band appeared in pre-recorded performances (filmed on March 29 and 31) on The Tonight Show Starring Jimmy Fallon where "Black Summer" made its live debut and on Jimmy Kimmel Live!, where they performed "These Are the Ways" for the first time on the rooftop of The Hollywood Roosevelt hotel where the album cover and photos were shot, On April 5, they appeared on The Howard Stern Show where they were interviewed and performed "These Are the Ways" along with two handpicked songs by Howard Stern, "Give It Away" and "Under the Bridge".

On April 7, they gave a special four song performance (with Frusciante on acoustic guitar) at Amoeba Music in Hollywood, California. The performance included a cover of Black Flag's "Nervous Breakdown" which was last performed by the band in 2016. The band gave a surprise invite-only performance on April 14 at the Yaamava' Theater in Highland, CA, for the opening of the Yaamava' Resort & Casino. They were the first to ever perform at the theater. This performance saw the live debut of "Whatchu Thinkin'". On May 1, the band performed at the New Orleans Jazz & Heritage Festival, replacing the Foo Fighters who cancelled their appearance following the death of drummer Taylor Hawkins. The band closed the show with "By the Way" marking the first time the song closed a show since 2007. SiriusXM launched the Whole Lotta Red Hot channel on April 1, and it was announced that an exclusive concert for subscribers would air on the channel later in the year.

=== European leg ===
The band kicked off their Unlimited Love Tour in Seville on June 4, 2022. It marked the band's first tour with Frusciante since their Stadium Arcadium World Tour in 2006–07 and their first ever show in Seville. The setlist consists of 17 songs with the shows lasting under two hours, which has been common for the band throughout their career. On June 7, 2022, the band performed in Barcelona where the setlist saw a drastic change from the first night. "The Heavy Wing" from Unlimited Love made its live debut, while songs including "Around the World" "Dani California", "I Could Have Lied" and "Right on Time" were performed with Frusciante for the first time in over 15 years. At the band's June 10 show in the Netherlands, "One Way Traffic" from Unlimited Love made its live debut while "Hard to Concentrate" from 2006's Stadium Arcadium was performed for the first time with Frusciante and "I Like Dirt" from 1999's Californication was performed for the first time since 2004 with Frusciante. On June 12, the band performed in Bratislava, Slovakia at the Lovestream Festival where "She's a Lover" and "White Braids & Pillow Chair" from Unlimited Love made their live debut along with "Me and My Friends" making its tour debut. "Thirty Dirty Birds", a short spoken-word song from 1985's Freaky Styley, was recited by Flea during the show. It marked the first time since 1991 it had been performed. At their June 15 show in Budapest, "It's Only Natural" from Unlimited Love made its live debut, while "Don't Forget Me" made its tour debut.

"Universally Speaking" was performed for the first time since 2004 with Frusciante at the band's June 22 show in Manchester. Under the Bridge finally made its return on June 25 in London after being dropped from previous shows. That same show, "Emit Remmus" also made its tour debut. On June 29 in Dublin, "If You Have to Ask", "Sir Psycho Sexy" and "They're Red Hot" from their 1991 album Blood Sugar Sex Magik made their tour debuts. The band announced that they had to cancel their July 1 show in Glasgow due to an illness and said they were working on ways to reschedule the show.

=== North American leg ===
The band kicked off the North American leg of their tour on July 23, 2022, in Denver, Colorado. During the show, the band announced that their 13th studio album, Return of the Dream Canteen, would be released on October 14, 2022. The band's July 29, 2022, show in Santa Clara saw the tour debut of the rarely performed "She's Only 18", which was last performed in 2017, and on the August 6, 2022 in Las Vegas saw the tour debut of "Blood Sugar Sex Magik". "Strip My Mind" made its tour debut in Nashville on August 12. The band performed "Black Summer" and "Can't Stop" at the 2022 MTV Video Music Awards on August 28 where received the Global Icon Award, presented to them by Cheech & Chong, and also won the award for Best Rock Video for "Black Summer". The band performed a special show at The Apollo Theater in New York City on September 13, 2022, as part of the SiriusXM Small Stage Series. The show was broadcast live on the band's SiriusXM channel Whole Lotta Red Hot and fans could win tickets by listening to the channel. The band's show on September 15, 2022, in Orlando was delayed for over an hour due to a rainstorm. During the show, John Frusciante performed "I Remember You" by the Ramones to pay tribute to his late friend Johnny Ramone who had died 18 years earlier on that date. The North American leg of the stadium tour wrapped up on September 18, 2022, in Arlington, Texas. Festival performances will conclude the remainder of the North America dates in 2022.

On October 9, "Eddie" made its live debut at the Austin City Limits Music Festival. It was the first performance of a song from Return of the Dream Canteen. On October 12, the band made a surprise appearance at Hoopa Valley High School in Hoopa, California, where they performed twelve songs for the students during the school's Indigenous Peoples' Day assembly. The band performed their final show of 2022 at the Silverlake Conservatory of Music on October 29. The show was dedicated to the band's former drummer D.H. Peligro who died the previous day. The band performed their first show of 2023 on January 14 at the iHeartRadio ALTer Ego music festival in Inglewood, California, where "Fake as Fu@k" (the show's opening song), "The Drummer" and "Tippa My Tongue" made their live debuts.

=== Oceania leg ===
The tour resumed on January 21, 2023, with eight dates in New Zealand and Australia, with Post Malone serving as the opening act. Unlike with the previous legs of the tour, "Give it Away" is now closing out the band's encore and "By the Way" is closing out the main set. "Reach Out" made its live debut on January 26, 2023, in New Zealand. "Carry Me Home" made its live debut during the second show in Sydney on February 4, 2023.

=== Asian leg ===
The band performed their first shows on the tour in Asia, with three dates scheduled for February 16, 19 and 21, 2023 in Singapore and Japan. For the first time on the tour, "Around the World" appeared late in the band's set during their February 16 show in Singapore. The song had been alternated with "Can't Stop" as the band's opening song for the entire tour. "Fake as Fu@k" opened the show for only the second time on the tour.

=== North American leg II ===
A second North American leg of the tour, consisting of twelve shows, began in March 2023 in Mexico City. It concluded on May 28, 2023, in Napa, California, at the BottleRock Napa Valley festival. City and Colour, The Mars Volta, The Strokes, Thundercat, St. Vincent, and King Princess will serve as opening acts.

=== European leg II ===
A thirteen-date second European leg began on June 18, 2023, in the Netherlands and wrapped up on July 23 in Glasgow. Iggy Pop, The Roots, The Mars Volta, and King Princess each served as the opening act at some of the band's six headlining shows, while the other seven shows saw the band headline various festivals. Additionally, other artists such as Kid Cudi, Ice Cube, Ken Carson, Otoboke Beaver, Seun Kuti, and Irontom made their guest appearances as well throughout the second European leg of the tour.

=== North America leg III ===
A four date North American leg began on August 6 in Chicago and concluded on October 14 in Los Angeles, when the band performed a private benefit show at Flea's Silverlake Conservatory of Music where they performed "Out in L.A." for the first time since 2004 and only the second time since 1992. They also performed a cover of the Ramones song "Havana Affair" for the first time since 2007.

=== Latin American leg ===
A Latin American leg was announced in March 2023, consisting of ten shows starting in San José, Costa Rica, on October 31 and wrapping up on November 26 in Buenos Aires.

=== North American leg IV ===
A fourth and final North American leg of the tour was announced on December 4, 2023, consisting of twenty-one shows starting on May 28, 2024, in Ridgefield, Washington and concluding on July 30, 2024, in St. Louis, Missouri. These shows moved away from stadiums that the band had been performing in for the entire tour and into smaller amphitheatres. The fourth North American leg was preceded by some smaller shows along with festival appearances.

The first performance on the leg was slated for December 9, 2023 in Inglewood, CA as part of the KROQ Almost Acoustic Christmas however on December 5, 2023, it was announced through the band's social media that one of the band members was injured and was unable to perform for six weeks. It was later revealed to be Frusciante, who broke a finger. The rescheduled date ultimately happened on March 2, 2024.

=== Asian leg II ===
Prior to the fourth North American leg, the band returned to Tokyo, Japan to play an additional two shows at the Tokyo Dome on May 18 and May 20, 2024.

== Songs performed ==
The band's setlist usually consisted of 17 songs with their shows lasting around one hour and forty-five minutes. "Can't Stop" and "Around the World" alternated as the band's opening songs (following an intro jam) for nearly the entire tour. However, "Fake as Fu@k" opened some shows during 2023, and "Dani California" opened many shows in 2024 alternating on setlists as an opener with "Can't Stop" and "Around the World".

For the first two legs, "By the Way" served as the band's closing song for their shows. The closing slot was typically held for many years by "Give it Away", which was now ending the main set. When the tour resumed for the third leg in January 2023, "Give it Away" was back to closing out the shows with "By the Way" returning to its main set closing spot. This tour has seen the band drop "Under the Bridge" from many of their setlists. The song had been written on various setlists but either dropped in favor of another song (typically "I Could Have Lied", "Soul to Squeeze" or "Sir Psycho Sexy") or not replaced by any song.

Most of the shows tended to ignore the band's first four albums from 1984 to 1989, with the exception of 1987's "Me and My Friends" and 1989's "Nobody Weird Like Me" being performed from time to time. Nothing from 1995's One Hot Minute (with the exception of Flea's "Pea"), 2011's I'm With You or 2016's The Getaway albums were performed due to them being recorded without Frusciante's involvement.

=== Originals/songs recorded by the band ===
Song	Album
"Get Up and Jump" (tease)	The Red Hot Chili Peppers
"Police Helicopter" (tease)	The Red Hot Chili Peppers
"Mommy, Where's Daddy?" (instrumental jam tease)	The Red Hot Chili Peppers
"Out in L.A."	The Red Hot Chili Peppers
"Sex Rap" (tease)	Freaky Styley
"Thirty Dirty Birds" (recited by Flea)	Freaky Styley
"Me and My Friends"	The Uplift Mofo Party Plan
"Good Time Boys" (tease)	Mother's Milk
"Higher Ground" (Stevie Wonder) (intro tease by Flea)	Mother's Milk
"Magic Johnson" (instrumental jam tease by Flea and Chad)	Mother's Milk
"Nobody Weird Like Me"	Mother's Milk
"Blood Sugar Sex Magik"	Blood Sugar Sex Magik
"Give It Away"	Blood Sugar Sex Magik
"I Could Have Lied"	Blood Sugar Sex Magik
"If You Have to Ask"	Blood Sugar Sex Magik
“My Lovely Man”(tease)	Blood Sugar Sex Magik
"Sir Psycho Sexy"	Blood Sugar Sex Magik
"Suck My Kiss"	Blood Sugar Sex Magik
"They're Red Hot" (Robert Johnson)	Blood Sugar Sex Magik
"Under the Bridge"	Blood Sugar Sex Magik
"Soul to Squeeze"	Coneheads: Music from the Motion Picture Soundtrack
"Pea" (performed by Flea, outro with Chad and John)	One Hot Minute
"Around the World"	Californication
"Californication"	Californication
"Emit Remmus"	Californication
"I Like Dirt"	Californication
"Otherside"	Californication
"Parallel Universe"	Californication
"Right on Time"	Californication
"Scar Tissue"	Californication
"By the Way"	By the Way
"Can't Stop"	By the Way
"Don't Forget Me"	By the Way
"The Zephyr Song"	By the Way
"Throw Away Your Television"	By the Way
"Universally Speaking"	By the Way
"Venice Queen" (tease)	By the Way
"Havana Affair" (Ramones)	We're a Happy Family: A Tribute to Ramones
"Charlie"	Stadium Arcadium
"Dani California"	Stadium Arcadium
"Hard to Concentrate"	Stadium Arcadium
"Hey"	Stadium Arcadium
"She's Only 18"	Stadium Arcadium
"Snow ((Hey Oh))"	Stadium Arcadium
"Strip My Mind"	Stadium Arcadium
"Tell Me Baby"	Stadium Arcadium
"Wet Sand"	Stadium Arcadium
"Aquatic Mouth Dance"	Unlimited Love
"Black Summer"	Unlimited Love
"Here Ever After"	Unlimited Love
"It's Only Natural"	Unlimited Love
"Not the One"	Unlimited Love
"One Way Traffic"	Unlimited Love
"She's a Lover"	Unlimited Love
"The Heavy Wing"	Unlimited Love
"These Are the Ways"	Unlimited Love
"Whatchu Thinkin'"	Unlimited Love
"White Braids & Pillow Chair"	Unlimited Love
"Carry Me Home"	Return of the Dream Canteen
"Eddie"	Return of the Dream Canteen
"Fake as Fu@k"	Return of the Dream Canteen
"Reach Out"	Return of the Dream Canteen
"The Drummer"	Return of the Dream Canteen
"Tippa My Tongue"	Return of the Dream Canteen

=== Cover songs (teases and jams unless otherwise noted) ===
Song	Artist
"50 Ways to Leave Your Lover"	Paul Simon
"Another One Bites the Dust"	Queen
"Boyz-n-the-Hood" (full band tease)	Eazy-E
"Cold Sweat"	James Brown
"Come Together" (teased by Anthony)	The Beatles
"Danny's Song" (teased/sung by John)	Loggins and Messina
"Dreamboy/Dreamgirl" (teased/sung by John)	Cynthia and Johnny O
"Fopp"	Ohio Players
"Hardcore Jollies"	Funkadelic
"Hey Joe"	The Jimi Hendrix Experience
"I Remember You" (teased/sung by John)	Ramones
"Latest Disgrace"	Fugazi
"Little Wing"	The Jimi Hendrix Experience
"London Calling" (tease as intro to "Right on Time")	The Clash
"Los Angeles"	X
"Kooks" (teased/sung by John)	David Bowie
"Marquee Moon"	Television
"Neighborhood Threat" (teased/sung by John)	Iggy Pop
"Orange Claw Hammer" (teased by Flea)	Captain Beefheart and his Magic Band
"Pure Imagination" (teased/sung by Flea)	Willy Wonka
"Red Hot Mama"	Funkadelic
"Roundabout"	Yes
"Set the Controls for the Heart of the Sun"	Pink Floyd
"Shadowplay"	Joy Division
"Show of Strength"	Echo and the Bunnymen
"Smells Like Teen Spirit" (full band, first verse and chorus only)	Nirvana
"Soul Love" (teased/sung by John)	David Bowie
"Sunday Bloody Sunday" (teased by Chad)	U2
"Terrapin" (teased/sung by John)	Syd Barrett
"The Guns of Brixton"	The Clash
"The Ocean"	Led Zeppelin
"The Rover"	Led Zeppelin
"Tiny Dancer" (teased/sung by John)	Elton John
"Untitled #2" (teased/sung by John)	John Frusciante
"Waiting Room"	Fugazi
"What is Soul?"	Funkadelic
"You're Gonna Get Yours"	Public Enemy
"Your Song" (teased/sung by John)	Elton John

== Tour dates ==
List of concerts, showing date, city, country, venue, opening act, tickets sold, number of available tickets and amount of gross revenue
Date	City	Country	Venue	Opening act	Attendance	Revenue
Pre-tour shows/performances – North America
April 1, 2022	Los Angeles	United States	Fonda Theatre (Note: This performance was a surprise show to promote the album.)	IRONTOM	—	—
April 14, 2022	Highland	United States	Yaamava' Theater (Note: This performance was private for VIP guests and held for the opening of the Yaamava' Resort & Casino.)	—N/a	—	—
May 1, 2022	New Orleans	United States	Fair Grounds Race Course (Note: This performance was part of New Orleans Jazz & Heritage Festival.) (Note: The band replaced Foo Fighters as headliner following the death of Taylor Hawkins.)	—N/a	—	—
Europe
June 4, 2022	Seville	Spain	Estadio de La Cartuja	Beck; Thundercat	55,308 / 55,308	$3,376,831
June 7, 2022	Barcelona	Spain	Estadi Olímpic Lluís Companys	Nas; Thundercat	42,594 / 51,287	$4,237,313
June 10, 2022	Nijmegen	Netherlands	Goffertpark	Nas; Thundercat	65,000 / 65,000	$5,517,953
June 12, 2022 (Note: This performance was part of Lovestream festival.)	Bratislava	Slovakia	Tehelné Pole	—N/a	—N/a	—N/a
June 15, 2022	Budapest	Hungary	Puskás Aréna	Nas; Thundercat	47,787 / 47,787	$2,949,414
June 18, 2022 (Note: This performance was part of Firenze Rocks festival.)	Florence	Italy	Visarno Arena	—N/a	—N/a	—N/a
June 22, 2022	Manchester	England	Emirates Old Trafford	A$AP Rocky; Thundercat	50,000 / 50,000	$5,216,748
June 25, 2022	London	England	London Stadium	Anderson .Paak & Free Nationals; Thundercat	141,698 / 141,698	$14,747,456
June 26, 2022	London	England	London Stadium	A$AP Rocky; Thundercat	141,698 / 141,698	$14,747,456
June 29, 2022	Dublin	Ireland	Marlay Park	Anderson .Paak & Free Nationals; Thundercat	38,403 / 38,403	$3,897,081
July 3, 2022 (Note: This performance was part of Rock Werchter.)	Werchter	Belgium	Festivalpark Werchter	—N/a	—N/a	—N/a
July 5, 2022	Cologne	Germany	RheinEnergieStadion	A$AP Rocky; Thundercat	39,394 / 39,394	$3,460,093
July 8, 2022	Paris	France	Stade de France	Anderson .Paak & Free Nationals; Thundercat	136,512 / 153,436	$12,851,604
July 9, 2022	Paris	France	Stade de France	Anderson .Paak & Free Nationals; Thundercat	136,512 / 153,436	$12,851,604
July 12, 2022	Hamburg	Germany	Volksparkstadion	A$AP Rocky	41,571 / 41,571	$3,475,927
North America
July 23, 2022	Denver	United States	Empower Field at Mile High	Haim; Thundercat	49,617 / 49,617	$6,748,875
July 27, 2022	San Diego	United States	Petco Park	Haim; Thundercat	38,788 / 38,788	$5,985,732
July 29, 2022	Santa Clara	United States	Levi's Stadium	Beck; Thundercat	45,743 / 45,743	$6,402,979
July 31, 2022	Inglewood	United States	SoFi Stadium	Beck; Thundercat	46,902 / 46,902	$8,560,363
August 3, 2022	Seattle	United States	T-Mobile Park	The Strokes; Thundercat	41,706 / 41,706	$5,489,712
August 6, 2022	Paradise	United States	Allegiant Stadium	The Strokes; King Princess	44,045 / 44,045	$8,469,298
August 10, 2022	Cumberland	United States	Truist Park	The Strokes; Thundercat	37,248 / 37,248	$4,378,677
August 12, 2022	Nashville	United States	Nissan Stadium	The Strokes; Thundercat	41,639 / 41,639	$5,463,821
August 14, 2022	Detroit	United States	Comerica Park	The Strokes; Thundercat	30,112 / 30,112	$4,048,198
August 17, 2022	East Rutherford	United States	MetLife Stadium	The Strokes; Thundercat	50,944 / 50,944	$9,475,596
August 19, 2022	Chicago	United States	Soldier Field	The Strokes; Thundercat	47,019 / 47,019	$7,500,942
August 21, 2022	Toronto	Canada	Rogers Centre	The Strokes; Thundercat	45,308 / 45,308	$6,079,232
August 30, 2022	Miami Gardens	United States	Hard Rock Stadium	The Strokes; Thundercat	42,572 / 42,572	$5,536,614
September 1, 2022	Charlotte	United States	Bank of America Stadium	The Strokes; Thundercat	43,269 / 43,269	$5,279,810
September 3, 2022	Philadelphia	United States	Citizens Bank Park	The Strokes; Thundercat	43,425 / 43,425	$6,217,390
September 8, 2022	Washington, D.C.	United States	Nationals Park	The Strokes; Thundercat	37,138 / 37,138	$4,924,889
September 10, 2022	Boston	United States	Fenway Park	St. Vincent; Thundercat	37,516 / 37,516	$6,196,020
September 15, 2022	Orlando	United States	Camping World Stadium	The Strokes; Thundercat	42,905 / 42,905	$4,572,379
September 18, 2022	Arlington	United States	Globe Life Field	The Strokes; Thundercat	41,362 / 41,362	$6,035,404
September 25, 2022 (Note: This performance was part of Louder Than Life festival.)	Louisville	United States	Kentucky Exposition Center	—N/a	—N/a	—N/a
October 9, 2022 (Note: These performances were part of Austin City Limits Music Festival.)	Austin	United States	Zilker Park	—N/a	—N/a	—N/a
October 16, 2022	Austin	United States	Zilker Park	—N/a	—N/a	—N/a
January 14, 2023 (Note: This performance is part of the iHeartRadio ALTer Ego music festival.)	Inglewood	United States	Kia Forum	—N/a	—N/a	—N/a
Oceania
January 21, 2023	Auckland	New Zealand	Mount Smart Stadium	Post Malone	40,051 / 41,573	$4,970,573
January 26, 2023	Dunedin	New Zealand	Forsyth Barr Stadium	Post Malone	28,004 / 37,484	$3,211,935
January 29, 2023	Brisbane	Australia	Suncorp Stadium	Post Malone	47,866 / 50,582	$6,970,055
February 2, 2023	Sydney	Australia	Accor Stadium	Post Malone	106,974 / 138,120	$13,450,562
February 4, 2023	Sydney	Australia	Accor Stadium	Post Malone	106,974 / 138,120	$13,450,562
February 7, 2023	Melbourne	Australia	Marvel Stadium	Post Malone	104,535 / 116,292	$12,785,784
February 9, 2023	Melbourne	Australia	Marvel Stadium	Post Malone	104,535 / 116,292	$12,785,784
February 12, 2023	Perth	Australia	Optus Stadium	Post Malone	51,180 / 57,236	$6,838,651
Asia
February 16, 2023	Singapore		Singapore National Stadium	—N/a	21,811 / 34,998	$3,276,339
February 19, 2023	Tokyo	Japan	Tokyo Dome	—N/a	45,319 / 45,319	$7,248,690
February 21, 2023	Osaka	Japan	Osaka-jō Hall	—N/a	10,857 / 10,857	$1,615,213
North America
March 19, 2023 (Note: This performance is part of the Vive Latino festival.)	Mexico City	Mexico	Foro Sol	—N/a	—N/a	—N/a
March 29, 2023	Vancouver	Canada	BC Place Stadium	City and Colour; King Princess	36,956 / 44,074	$3,748,782
April 1, 2023	Paradise	United States	Allegiant Stadium	St. Vincent; King Princess	39,884 / 39,884	$4,576,971
April 6, 2023	Fargo	United States	Fargodome	The Strokes; King Princess	19,331 / 19,331	$2,067,826
April 8, 2023	Minneapolis	United States	U.S. Bank Stadium	The Strokes; King Princess	38,546 / 41,474	$3,872,976
April 14, 2023	Syracuse	United States	JMA Wireless Dome	The Strokes; King Princess	30,347 / 32,776	$4,070,619
May 12, 2023	San Diego	United States	Snapdragon Stadium	The Mars Volta; Thundercat	25,682 / 25,682	$4,449,234
May 14, 2023	Glendale	United States	State Farm Stadium	The Strokes; Thundercat	44,313 / 55,923	$4,117,653
May 17, 2023	San Antonio	United States	Alamodome	The Strokes; Thundercat	46,945 / 46,945	$4,206,222
May 19, 2023 (Note: This performance is part of the Hangout Music Festival.)	Gulf Shores	United States	Hangout Music Festival	—N/a	—N/a	—N/a
May 25, 2023	Houston	United States	Minute Maid Park	The Strokes; Thundercat	40,908 / 41,350	$4,524,049
May 28, 2023 (Note: This performance is part of the BottleRock Napa Valley festival.)	Napa	United States	Napa Valley Expo	—N/a	—N/a	—N/a
Europe
June 18, 2023 (Note: This performance is part of the Pinkpop Festival.)	Landgraaf	Netherlands	Megaland	—N/a	—N/a	—N/a
June 21, 2023	Warsaw	Poland	PGE Narodowy	Iggy Pop; The Mars Volta	45,736 / 47,449	$4,469,519
June 24, 2023 (Note: This performance is part of the Tinderbox festival.)	Odense	Denmark	Tusindårsskoven	—N/a	—N/a	—N/a
June 26, 2023	Mannheim	Germany	Maimarktgelände	Iggy Pop; The Mars Volta	39,664 / 39,672	$3,795,013
June 30, 2023 (Note: This performance is part of the Rock Werchter festival.)	Werchter	Belgium	Werchter Festivalpark	—N/a	—N/a	—N/a
July 2, 2023 (Note: This performance is part of the I Days festival.)	Milan	Italy	Ippodromo La Maura	—N/a	—N/a	—N/a
July 6, 2023 (Note: This performance is part of the NOS Alive festival.)	Lisbon	Portugal	Passeio Marítimo de Algés	—N/a	—N/a	—N/a
July 8, 2023 (Note: This performance is part of the Mad Cool festival.)	Madrid	Spain	Valdebebas	—N/a	—N/a	—N/a
July 11, 2023	Lyon	France	Groupama Stadium	Iggy Pop; King Princess	49,158 / 50,331	$5,200,011
July 14, 2023	Vienna	Austria	Ernst-Happel-Stadion	Iggy Pop; King Princess	43,245 / 44,304	$5,059,231
July 17, 2023 (Note: This performance is part of the Vieilles Charrues Festival.)	Carhaix-Plouguer	France	La Prairie de Kerampuilh	—N/a	—N/a	—N/a
July 21, 2023	London	England	Tottenham Hotspur Stadium	The Roots; King Princess	42,599 / 42,599	$6,746,727
July 23, 2023	Glasgow	Scotland	Hampden Park	The Roots; King Princess	36,333 / 38,274	$3,980,425
North America
August 6, 2023 (Note: This performance was part of Lollapalooza.)	Chicago	United States	Grant Park	—N/a	—N/a	—N/a
September 27, 2023	Hershey	United States	Hershey Park Stadium	St. Vincent	22,439 / 25,320	$3,489,692
September 30, 2023 (Note: This performance is part of the Sound On Sound festival.)	Bridgeport	United States	Seaside Park	—N/a	—N/a	—N/a
October 14, 2023 (Note: This performance was part of a private benefit fundraising gala.)	Los Angeles	United States	Silverlake Conservatory of Music	—N/a	—	—
Latin America		United States				
October 31, 2023	San José	Costa Rica	Estadio Nacional	IRONTOM; Saint Cecilia	51,838 / 51,838	$2,266,423
November 4, 2023	Rio de Janeiro	Brazil	Estádio Olímpico Nilton Santos	IRONTOM	68,561 / 68,561	$5,355,705
November 7, 2023	Brasília	Brazil	Arena BRB Mané Garrincha	IRONTOM	55,220 / 55,220	$4,312,596
November 10, 2023	São Paulo	Brazil	Estádio do Morumbi	IRONTOM	71,239 / 71,239	$6,441,590
November 13, 2023	Curitiba	Brazil	Estádio Couto Pereira	IRONTOM	43,634 / 43,634	$3,792,799
November 16, 2023	Porto Alegre	Brazil	Arena do Grêmio	IRONTOM; 69 Enfermos	51,765 / 51,765	$4,622,116
November 19, 2023	Santiago	Chile	Movistar Arena	IRONTOM; Miles de Aves	33,661 / 33,661	$2,120,366
November 21, 2023	Santiago	Chile	Movistar Arena	IRONTOM; Miles de Aves	33,661 / 33,661	$2,120,366
November 24, 2023	Buenos Aires	Argentina	Estadio River Plate	IRONTOM; Outernational	124,769 / 124,769	$8,483,678
November 26, 2023	Buenos Aires	Argentina	Estadio River Plate	IRONTOM; Outernational	124,769 / 124,769	$8,483,678
North America
February 17, 2024	Lincoln	United States	The Venue at Thunder Valley Casino	—N/a	—	—
February 20, 2024	Highland	United States	Yaamava' Theater	—N/a	—	—
February 23, 2024 (Note: This performance is part of the Innings Festival)	Tempe	United States	Tempe Beach Park & Arts Park	—N/a	—	—
March 2, 2024 (Note: This performance was postponed from December 9, 2023 and was supposed to be part of KROQ Almost Acoustic Christmas.)	Inglewood	United States	Kia Forum	IRONTOM; ALEXSUCKS	—	—
Asia
May 18, 2024	Tokyo	Japan	Tokyo Dome	—N/a	—	—
May 20, 2024	Tokyo	Japan	Tokyo Dome	—N/a	—	—
North America
May 28, 2024	Ridgefield	United States	RV Inn Style Resorts Amphitheater	Ken Carson	13,769 / 13,769	$1,604,320
May 31, 2024	George	United States	The Gorge Amphitheatre	Ken Carson	22,863 / 22,863	$2,270,055
June 2, 2024	Wheatland	United States	Toyota Amphitheatre	Ken Carson	16,854 / 16,854	$1,908,750
June 5, 2024	West Valley City	United States	USANA Amphitheatre	DOMi & JD Beck	18,755 / 18,755	$1,984,873
June 7, 2024	Albuquerque	United States	Isleta Amphitheater	Wand	15,343 / 15,343	$1,629,594
June 15, 2024 (Note: This performance is part of the Bonnaroo Music and Arts Festival.)	Manchester	United States	Great Stage Park	—N/a	—	—
June 18, 2024	West Palm Beach	United States	iTHINK Financial Amphitheatre	DOMi & JD Beck	16,448 / 16,448	$1,828,814
June 21, 2024	Tampa	United States	MidFlorida Credit Union Amphitheatre	Ice Cube	18,211 / 18,211	$1,984,079
June 23, 2024	Hollywood	United States	Hard Rock Live	Ice Cube	6,730 / 6,730	$1,839,612
June 26, 2024	Raleigh	United States	Coastal Credit Union Music Park	Ice Cube	18,230 / 18,230	$2,153,656
June 28, 2024	Virginia Beach	United States	Veterans United Home Loans Amphitheater	Ice Cube	19,132 / 19,132	$2,044,215
July 2, 2024	Burgettstown	United States	The Pavilion at Star Lake	DOMi & JD Beck	22,555 / 22,555	$2,179,247
July 5, 2024	Cincinnati	United States	Riverbend Music Center	DOMi & JD Beck	20,225 / 20,225	$1,965,096
July 12, 2024	Darien Center	United States	Darien Lake Performing Arts Center	Wand	19,322 / 19,322	$2,228,872
July 15, 2024	Toronto	Canada	Budweiser Stage	Wand	—	—
July 17, 2024	Toronto	Canada	Budweiser Stage	Wand	31,711 / 31,711	$3,571,248
July 20, 2024 (Note: This performance is part of the Minnesota Yacht Club Festival)	St. Paul	United States	Harriet Island Regional Park	—N/a	—	—
July 22, 2024	Cuyahoga Falls	United States	Blossom Music Center	Seun Kuti	18,652 / 18,652	$1,923,696
July 25, 2024	Noblesville	United States	Ruoff Music Center	Otoboke Beaver	23,276 / 23,276	$2,248,852
July 27, 2024 (Note: This performance is part of the Harley-Davidson Homecoming festival.)	Milwaukee	United States	Veterans Park	—N/a	—	—
July 30, 2024	Maryland Heights	United States	Hollywood Casino Amphitheatre	Otoboke Beaver	20,129 / 20,129	$2,196,670
Total					—	—

== Cancelled dates ==
List of cancelled concerts, showing date, city, country, venue, and reason for cancellation
Date	City	Country	Venue	Reason
July 1, 2022	Glasgow	Scotland	Bellahouston Park	Illness
2023	Tel Aviv	Israel	Yarkon Park	Scheduling issues
December 9, 2023	Inglewood	United States	Kia Forum	John Frusciante injury; moved to March 2, 2024.

== Opening/support acts ==
- IRONTOM (April 1, 2022;October 31 – November 26, 2023, March 2, 2024 (they were scheduled to open many dates from May 2024-July 2024 but cancelled due to an illness))
- Beck (June 4, 2022, July 29, 31 2022)
- Thundercat (June 4 – July 9, 2022, July 23 – August 3, 2022, August 10 – September 18, 2022, May 12–25, 2023)
- Nas (June 7, 10, 15, 2022)
- A$AP Rocky (June 22, 26, 2022, July 5, 12, 2022)
- Anderson .Paak & Free Nationals (June 25, 29 2022, July 8–9, 2022)
- Haim (July 23, 27, 2022)
- The Strokes (August 3–21, 2022, August 30 – September 8, 2022, September 15, 18, 2022, April 6–14, 2023, May 14, 17, 29, 2023)
- King Princess (August 6, 2022, March 29 – April 14, 2023, July 11, 14, 21, 23, 2023)
- St. Vincent (September 10, 2022, April 1, 2023, )
- Post Malone (January 21 – February 12, 2023)
- City and Colour (March 29, 2023)
- The Mars Volta (May 12, June 26, 2023)
- Iggy Pop (June 21, 26, July 11, 14, 2023)
- The Roots (July 21, 23, 2023)
- ALEXSUCKS (March 2, 2024)
- Ken Carson (May 28, 2024 – June 2, 2024)
- Wand (June 7, 2024;July 12, 15 2024)
- DOMi & JD Beck (June 5, 18 2024;July 2 - 5 2024)
- Ice Cube (June 21, 23, 26, 28 2024)
- Seun Kuti (July 22, 2024)
- Otoboke Beaver (July 25, 30 2024)

== Personnel ==
- Flea – bass, backing vocals, lead vocals (on "Pea")
- Anthony Kiedis – lead vocals
- John Frusciante – guitar, backing vocals, co-lead vocals (on "The Heavy Wing")
- Chad Smith – drums, percussion

Additional musicians

- Chris Warren – keyboards, drum synthesizer, percussion

Guest musicians

- Jay Rock – (joined the band on "Give it Away" at their August 16, 2023 show)
- Kamasi Washington – (joined the band on saxophone for "Aquatic Mouth Dance" at their February 20, 2024 show)
