= Eddie (song) =

Single by Red Hot Chili Peppers

from the album Return of the Dream Canteen
- Released: September 23, 2022
- Recorded: 2021
- Studio: Shangri-La (Malibu, California)
- Genre: Alternative rock
- Length: 5:42
- Label: Warner
- Songwriters: Anthony Kiedis; Flea; John Frusciante; Chad Smith
- Producer: Rick Rubin

Red Hot Chili Peppers singles chronology
"Tippa My Tongue" (2022)	"Eddie" (2022)	"The Drummer" (2022)

Official audio video
- "Eddie" on YouTube

"Eddie" is a song by American rock band Red Hot Chili Peppers from the band's thirteenth studio album Return of the Dream Canteen. The song was released as the second single on September 23, 2022. No music video was created for the song, but it did receive moderate airplay. Its solo was voted by Guitar World readers as the 9th best guitar solo of 2022.

== Background ==
"Eddie" was written as a tribute to guitarist Eddie Van Halen, who died in 2020. It was first conceived by Flea the day after his death, after which the rest of the band contributed to the track.

== Live performances ==
"Eddie" was performed for the first time on October 9, 2022, at the Austin City Limits Music Festival. It was the first song from Return of the Dream Canteen to be performed live.

== Personnel ==
Red Hot Chili Peppers

- Anthony Kiedis – lead vocals
- Flea – bass
- John Frusciante – guitar, harmony vocals
- Chad Smith – drums

Additional personnel

- Rick Rubin – production
- Ryan Hewitt – engineering

== Charts ==
Chart performance for "Eddie"
Chart (2022)	Peak position
Japan Hot Overseas (Billboard Japan)	9
New Zealand Hot Singles (RMNZ)	18
