= The Drummer (song) =

Single by Red Hot Chili Peppers

from the album Return of the Dream Canteen
- Released: October 14, 2022
- Recorded: 2021
- Studio: Shangri-La (Malibu, California)
- Genre: Funk rock, pop rock
- Length: 3:24
- Label: Warner
- Songwriters: Anthony Kiedis; Flea; John Frusciante; Chad Smith
- Producer: Rick Rubin

Red Hot Chili Peppers singles chronology
"Eddie" (2022)	"The Drummer" (2022)

Music video
- "The Drummer" on YouTube

"The Drummer" is a song by American alternative rock band Red Hot Chili Peppers and was the third single from the band's thirteenth studio album Return of the Dream Canteen. The single, along with a music video, was released on October 14, 2022.

== Music video ==
The music video for the song was directed by Phillip R. Lopez. The music video features the Chili Peppers performing an intimate concert while breakdancers and others dance around them in an underground nightclub.

== Chart performance ==
The single reached No. 10 on the Billboard Alternative Airplay chart and No. 21 on the Rock & Alternative Airplay chart.

== Live performances ==
The song made its live debut on January 14, 2023, at the iHeartRadio ALTer Ego music festival in Inglewood, CA.

== Personnel ==
- Anthony Kiedis – vocals
- Flea – bass
- John Frusciante – guitar, keyboards, synthesizers, backing vocals
- Chad Smith – drums, tambourine

=== Additional personnel ===
- Rick Rubin – production
- Ryan Hewitt – engineering
