= Return of the Dream Canteen =

Studio album by Red Hot Chili Peppers
- Released: October 14, 2022
- Recorded: November 2020 – August 2021
- Studio: Shangri-La (Malibu, California)
- Genres: Funk rock; alternative rock
- Length: 75:23
- Label: Warner
- Producer: Rick Rubin

Red Hot Chili Peppers chronology
Unlimited Love (2022)	Return of the Dream Canteen (2022)

Singles from Return of the Dream Canteen
- 1. "Tippa My Tongue" Released: August 19, 2022; 2. "Eddie" Released: September 23, 2022; 3. "The Drummer" Released: October 14, 2022

Alternative cover
- Indie store exclusive limited edition cover

Return of the Dream Canteen is the thirteenth studio album by the American rock band Red Hot Chili Peppers, released on October 14, 2022, through Warner Records as a double LP and single CD. Produced by Rick Rubin, it was recorded during the same sessions as the band's previous studio album, Unlimited Love, released only 5 months earlier and marking the shortest gap between two albums from the band to date.

The first single, "Tippa My Tongue", was released on August 19, 2022, and was followed by the album's second single, "Eddie", on September 23, and the third single, "The Drummer", on October 14.

== Background and recording ==
The Red Hot Chili Peppers wrote and recorded Return of the Dream Canteen during the same sessions as their previous studio album, Unlimited Love (2022). The sessions marked the return of guitarist John Frusciante after a ten-year absence, and resulted in almost 50 songs being recorded with producer Rick Rubin and recording engineer Ryan Hewitt. The band initially intended for 40 of the tracks to be released as one album, spread over seven physical discs. The band's label, Warner Records, resisted this release strategy, with a "compromise" being reached where the band split thirty-four songs across two separate studio albums.

Reflecting on the wealth of material that the band recorded, drummer Chad Smith noted: "We just wrote a bunch of music and wrote and wrote with no time constraints and ended up recording all these songs. We always record more than what comes out on a record, but often they get left in the vault or unfinished or whatever. But we finished them all. We just felt like we had too many good songs to not put out another record. It's not like a b-sides record or anything like that. Everything felt good and right."

The band sequenced both Unlimited Love and Return of the Dream Canteen to become distinct listening experiences from one another: "We thought, 'These [songs] go together here and these go together there and, look, we've got two things, both great.'"

== Writing and composition ==
Alongside performing guitar and backing vocals across the album's seventeen tracks, band member John Frusciante recorded multiple keyboard and synthesiser overdubs during the sessions. Regarding his electronic-influenced parts, Frusciante noted: "What I'm doing has its roots in Brian Eno's work in Roxy Music — where synths and other gadgets are used to alter the sound of a live group, create atmosphere, sonic movement, and generally have unexpected sounds come in every so often." Frusciante embraced several effects and studio techniques to alter and augment his bandmates' performances: "A little bit can go a long way towards taking a live band out of the real world and into an alternate reality. Also, a lot of the lead vocal treatments, which I did with delays and reverbs and sometimes synths, are things I do in my electronic music to samples. I do these things to all the instruments. The electronic part of it has as much to do with using the studio in a creative way as it does with synths."

During the writing process, Frusciante and drummer Chad Smith discussed Frusciante's love of electronic breakbeats, a form of drum sampling used in hip hop, jungle, drum and bass and UK garage music. As a result of Frusciante playing Smith "a ton of three-10 second breaks in a row", Smith incorporated these influences into his playing during the Return of the Dream Canteen and Unlimited Love sessions. The drumbeat to the song, "Peace and Love", was inspired by a breakbeat from the Isaac Hayes song, "Breakthrough".

The album's title, Return of the Dream Canteen, represents "a well of creative prosperity" to vocalist Anthony Kiedis, who noted that the ongoing COVID-19 pandemic resulted in the band having a significant amount of time to write and record together: "It was also just a stretch of weird time where everyone stayed home for two years, and time got a little bit elastic. Instead of having to rush, we just said, 'OK let's keep writing music,' and this was the result - and that was the phrase that came to mind."

== Artwork ==
The album's artwork was created by French artists Thami Nabil and Julien Calemard, who had previously created a music video for the track "Poster Child" from Unlimited Love. The pair were discovered by the band's visual creative director and Frusciante's wife, Marcia Pinna, while looking for artists to create imagery for her own music, under the name Aura T-09: "I loved their drawings. They just have a really interesting take on illustration and animation. They have an eye. They have subject matter that's really interesting; it's always a bit weird and trippy."

Upon Return of the Dream Canteen's release, Nabil and Calemard created animated music videos for each track on the album.

=== Limited editions ===
In honor of the Los Angeles Rams' victory in Super Bowl LVI, the band released a limited edition vinyl in the team's colors and a Rams sticker in the record sleeve as a bonus edition for purchase online only.

== Promotion ==
The band announced the album during their Global Stadium Tour on July 23, 2022, at their show in Denver with pre-sales of the album being made available which included various versions of the album on limited edition vinyl.

The album's first single, "Tippa My Tongue", was released alongside a music video on August 19, 2022. The song was performed for the first time on January 14, 2023. A second song from the album, "Eddie", which was inspired by musician Eddie Van Halen, was released as the second single on September 23, 2022. "Eddie" was performed for the first time on October 9, 2022, at the Austin City Limits Music Festival. It was the first song from the album to be performed live. "The Drummer" was released as the album's third single alongside its music video on October 14, 2022. The song was performed for the first time on January 14, 2023.

The Global Stadium Tour, which began in June 2022 in support of Unlimited Love, continued in January 2023 in support of Return of the Dream Canteen. The tour wrapped up in July 2024.

== Critical reception ==
Professional ratings
Aggregate scores
Source	Rating
AnyDecentMusic?	6.5/10
Metacritic	69/100
Review scores
Source	Rating
AllMusic	3/5 stars
The Arts Desk	4/5 stars
Clash	8/10
Classic Rock	4/5 stars
Evening Standard	2/5 stars
Exclaim!	7/10
laut.de	4/5 stars
NME	3/5 stars
Pitchfork	6.3/10
Sputnikmusic	3.4/5.0

Return of the Dream Canteen received generally positive reviews from critics. It currently has a score of 69 on Metacritic, indicating "generally favorable reviews". Rolling Stone gave particular praise to Frusciante's performance on the album, listing his parts on "Eddie" and "Handful" as highlights. Consequence praised much of the material, but also noted that "moments that could have otherwise made a significant impact feel diluted", due to the band's rapid release schedule in 2022.

Gerrod Harris of The Spill Magazine praises the release and states, "Overall, Return Of The Dream Canteen feels like a less mainstream Unlimited Love. Written and recorded during the same sessions, this is only natural; however, there is an element of creativity and reckless abandon to Return Of The Dream Canteen that sees the pop influence of the sessions – while still present – take a back seat. These aren't B-sides, nor are they leftovers, instead, Return Of The Dream Canteen is a weirder and far more experimental record."

It was ranked as the 5th best guitar album of 2022 by Guitar World readers.

== Commercial performance ==
The album made its debut at number-one in six countries. It reached number three in the band's home country of the United States on the Billboard 200 chart and reached number-one on the Top Albums Chart giving the band their second number-one album in 2022 and making them the first rock band with two number-one albums in the same year in 17 years since System of a Down in 2005 accomplished this. Coincidentally, Rubin produced all 4 albums.

"Tippa My Tongue” became the band's fourth number-one single on the Rock & Alternative Airplay chart and made them the only band with two number-one singles on that chart in 2022, the other being "Black Summer". On the Alternative Airplay chart, the song reached the 15th number one and became the band's 27th top ten single on that chart, one shy of the record held by the Foo Fighters.

== Track listing ==
All tracks are written by Anthony Kiedis, Flea, John Frusciante, and Chad Smith.

Return of the Dream Canteen track listing
No.	Title	Length
1.	"Tippa My Tongue"	4:20
2.	"Peace and Love"	4:03
3.	"Reach Out"	4:11
4.	"Eddie"	5:42
5.	"Fake as Fu@k"	4:22
6.	"Bella"	4:51
7.	"Roulette"	4:57
8.	"My Cigarette"	4:24
9.	"Afterlife"	4:14
10.	"Shoot Me a Smile"	3:42
11.	"Handful"	4:00
12.	"The Drummer"	3:22
13.	"Bag of Grins"	5:06
14.	"La La La La La La La La"	3:57
15.	"Copperbelly"	3:45
16.	"Carry Me Home"	4:13
17.	"In the Snow"	6:05
Total length:		75:14

Alternate cover & Japanese CD bonus track
No.	Title	Length
18.	"The Shape I'm Takin'"	3:35
Total length:		78:49

Tour edition CD bonus track
No.	Title	Length
18.	"Whatchu Thinkin'" (live in Paris)	3:44
Total length:		78:58

== Outtakes ==
In a 2022 interview, Frusciante said that the band had recorded 48 songs. "Nerve Flip" was released as a bonus track on the Japanese release of Unlimited Love while "The Shape I'm Takin'" was released as a bonus track on the Japanese version of Return of the Dream Canteen. 12 of the 48 songs recorded have yet to be released. Among the unreleased songs is a song called "Comedy Store".

== Personnel ==
Red Hot Chili Peppers

- Anthony Kiedis – lead vocals
- Flea – bass
- John Frusciante – guitar, keyboards, synthesizers, backing vocals
- Chad Smith – drums

Additional musicians

- Aura T-09 – background vocals (track 2)
- Lenny Castro – percussion (2)
- Mauro Refosco – percussion (14)
- Josh Johnson – saxophone (2, 5, 6, 8, 11)
- Vikram Devasthali – trombone (5, 6, 11)
- Nathaniel Walcott – trumpet (5, 6, 11)

Technical

- Rick Rubin – production
- Vlado Meller – mastering (CD)
- Ryan Hewitt – mixing, engineering
- Bernie Grundman – mastering (vinyl)
- Bo Bodnar – engineering
- Dylan Neustadter – engineering
- Ethan Mates – engineering
- Jason Lader – engineering
- Phillip Broussard Jr. – engineering
- Jeremy Lubsey – mastering assistance
- Chaz Sexton – engineering assistance
- Jonathan Pfarr – engineering assistance
- Sami Bañuelos – band assistance
- Charlie Bolois – studio technician
- Lawrence Malchose – studio technician
- Chris Warren – technician
- Henry Trejo – technician
- Eric Lynn – production coordination
- Gage Freeman – production coordination

Artwork

- Sarah Zoraya – creative design, design
- Julien Calemard – illustrations
- Thami Nabil – illustrations
- Clara Balzary – photography

== Charts ==
=== Weekly charts ===
Weekly chart performance for Return of the Dream Canteen
Chart (2022)	Peak position
Australian Albums (ARIA)	2
Austrian Albums (Ö3 Austria)	1
Belgian Albums (Ultratop Flanders)	2
Belgian Albums (Ultratop Wallonia)	2
Canadian Albums (Billboard)	3
Croatian International Albums (HDU)	1
Czech Albums (ČNS IFPI)	17
Danish Albums (Hitlisten)	27
Dutch Albums (Album Top 100)	1
Finnish Albums (Suomen virallinen lista)	4
French Albums (SNEP)	1
German Albums (Offizielle Top 100)	1
Hungarian Albums (MAHASZ)	2
Irish Albums (Official Charts)	4
Italian Albums (FIMI)	5
Japanese Albums (Oricon)	9
Japanese Combined Albums (Oricon)	9
Japanese Hot Albums (Billboard Japan)	7
Lithuanian Albums (AGATA)	62
New Zealand Albums (RMNZ)	1
Norwegian Albums (VG-lista)	22
Polish Albums (ZPAV)	4
Portuguese Albums (AFP)	1
Scottish Albums (Official Charts)	3
Spanish Albums (Promusicae)	7
Swedish Albums (Sverigetopplistan)	25
Swiss Albums (Schweizer Hitparade)	1
UK Albums (Official Charts)	2
Uruguayan Albums (CUD)	4
US Billboard 200	3
US Top Alternative Albums (Billboard)	1
US Top Rock Albums (Billboard)	1

=== Year-end charts ===
Year-end chart performance for Return of the Dream Canteen
Chart (2022)	Position
French Albums (SNEP)	191
German Albums (Offizielle Top 100)	62
Swiss Albums (Schweizer Hitparade)	80
US Top Album Sales (Billboard)	88
US Top Alternative Albums (Billboard)	35
