= Tippa My Tongue =

Single by Red Hot Chili Peppers

from the album Return of the Dream Canteen
- Released: August 19, 2022
- Recorded: 2021
- Studio: Shangri-La (Malibu, California)
- Genre: Funk rock; psychedelic funk
- Length: 4:20
- Label: Warner
- Songwriters: Anthony Kiedis; Flea; John Frusciante; Chad Smith
- Producer: Rick Rubin

Red Hot Chili Peppers singles chronology
"These Are the Ways" (2022)	"Tippa My Tongue" (2022)	"Eddie" (2022)

Music video
- "Tippa My Tongue" on YouTube

"Tippa My Tongue" is a song by American alternative rock band Red Hot Chili Peppers and the first single from the band's thirteenth studio album Return of the Dream Canteen. The single, along with a music video, was released on August 19, 2022.

"Tippa My Tongue" became the band's fourth number-one single on the Rock & Alternative Airplay chart and made them the only band with two number-one singles on that chart in 2022, the other being "Black Summer". On the Alternative Airplay chart, the song reached the 15th number one and became the band's 27th top ten single on that chart, one shy of the record held by the Foo Fighters.

== Background ==
First mentioned onstage by Flea and Kiedis alongside the announcement of the full album in Denver, Colorado, "Tippa My Tongue" is an upbeat funk rock song. Drummer Chad Smith described the track's influences as: "It's got P-Funk in it. I hear George [Clinton] in it, and some Hendrixy kind of licks."

== Music video ==
The music video for the song was directed by Malia James. The psychedelic imagery of the video was described as "trippy" by Louder and NME.

== Live performances ==
Nearly five months after its release, the song made its live debut on January 14, 2023, at the iHeartRadio ALTer Ego music festival in Inglewood, CA.

== Personnel ==
- Anthony Kiedis – vocals
- Flea – bass
- John Frusciante – guitar, vocals
- Chad Smith – drums

=== Additional personnel ===
- Rick Rubin – production
- Ryan Hewitt – engineering

== Charts ==
=== Weekly charts ===
Chart performance for "Tippa My Tongue"
Chart (2022)	Peak position
Canada Rock (Billboard)	1
Czech Republic Rock (IFPI)	5
Japan Hot Overseas (Billboard Japan)	1
New Zealand Hot Singles (RMNZ)	21
UK Singles Downloads (OCC)	69
UK Singles Sales (OCC)	71
US Alternative Airplay (Billboard)	1
US Hot Rock & Alternative Songs (Billboard)	18
US Rock & Alternative Airplay (Billboard)	1

=== Year-end charts ===
Year-end chart performance for "Tippa My Tongue"
Chart (2022)	Position
US Rock Airplay (Billboard)	26
