= Red Hot Chili Peppers =

American rock band

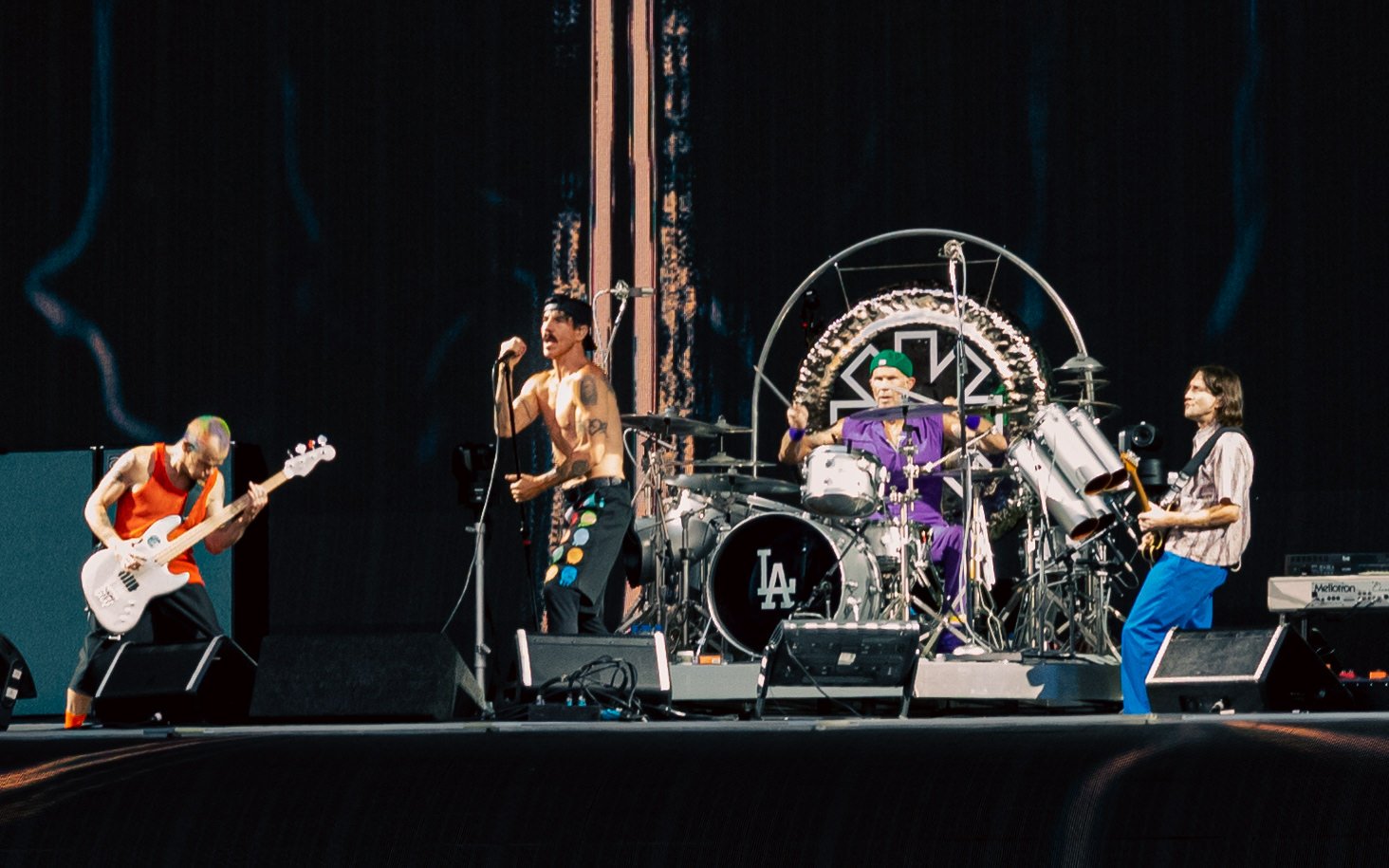
- From left: Flea, Anthony Kiedis, Chad Smith, John Frusciante (2022)

Background information
- Also known as: Tony Flow and the Miraculously Majestic Masters of Mayhem (1982–1983)
- Origin: Los Angeles, California, U.S.
- Genres: Alternative rock; funk rock; rap rock; funk metal
- Works: Discography; songs
- Years active: 1982–present
- Labels: Capitol; EMI; Enigma; Warner
- Spinoff of: What Is This?
- Awards: Full list
- Members: Flea; Anthony Kiedis; Chad Smith; John Frusciante
- Past members: Hillel Slovak; Jack Irons; Cliff Martinez; Jack Sherman; DeWayne McKnight; D. H. Peligro; Arik Marshall; Jesse Tobias; Dave Navarro; Josh Klinghoffer
- Website: redhotchilipeppers.com

The Red Hot Chili Peppers are an American rock band formed in Los Angeles in 1982, consisting of Flea (bass), Anthony Kiedis (vocals), Chad Smith (drums), and John Frusciante (guitar). Their music incorporates elements of alternative rock, funk, punk rock, hard rock, hip-hop, and psychedelic rock, and has influenced genres including funk metal, rap metal, rap rock, and nu metal. With over 120 million records sold worldwide, the Red Hot Chili Peppers are one of the top-selling bands of all time. They hold the records for most number-one singles on the American Alternative Songs charts (15), most cumulative weeks at number one (91), and most top-ten songs on the Billboard Alternative Songs chart (28). They have won three Grammy Awards, were inducted into the Rock and Roll Hall of Fame in 2012, and in 2022 received a star on the Hollywood Walk of Fame.

The Red Hot Chili Peppers were formed in Los Angeles by Kiedis, Flea, guitarist Hillel Slovak, and drummer Jack Irons. Due to commitments to other bands, Slovak and Irons did not play on their 1984 self-titled debut album, which instead featured guitarist Jack Sherman and drummer Cliff Martinez. Slovak rejoined for their second album, Freaky Styley (1985), and Irons for their third, The Uplift Mofo Party Plan (1987). Irons left after Slovak died of a drug overdose in June 1988.

With Frusciante and Smith, the Red Hot Chili Peppers recorded Mother's Milk (1989) and their first major commercial success, Blood Sugar Sex Magik (1991). Frusciante was uncomfortable with their newfound popularity and left abruptly on tour in 1992. After a series of temporary guitarists, he was replaced by Jane's Addiction guitarist Dave Navarro. Their next album, One Hot Minute (1995), failed to match the success of Blood Sugar Sex Magik. Frusciante and Kiedis struggled with drug addiction throughout the 1990s.

In 1998, Navarro departed and Frusciante rejoined the band. Their seventh album, Californication (1999), became their biggest commercial success, with 16 million copies sold worldwide. By the Way (2002) and Stadium Arcadium (2006) were also successful; Stadium Arcadium was their first album to reach number one on the Billboard 200 chart. Frusciante left again in 2009 to focus on his solo career; he was replaced by Josh Klinghoffer, who appeared on I'm with You (2011) and The Getaway (2016), before Frusciante rejoined in 2019. The Chili Peppers released their 12th and 13th albums, Unlimited Love and Return of the Dream Canteen, in 2022.

== History ==
=== 1982–1984: Early history ===
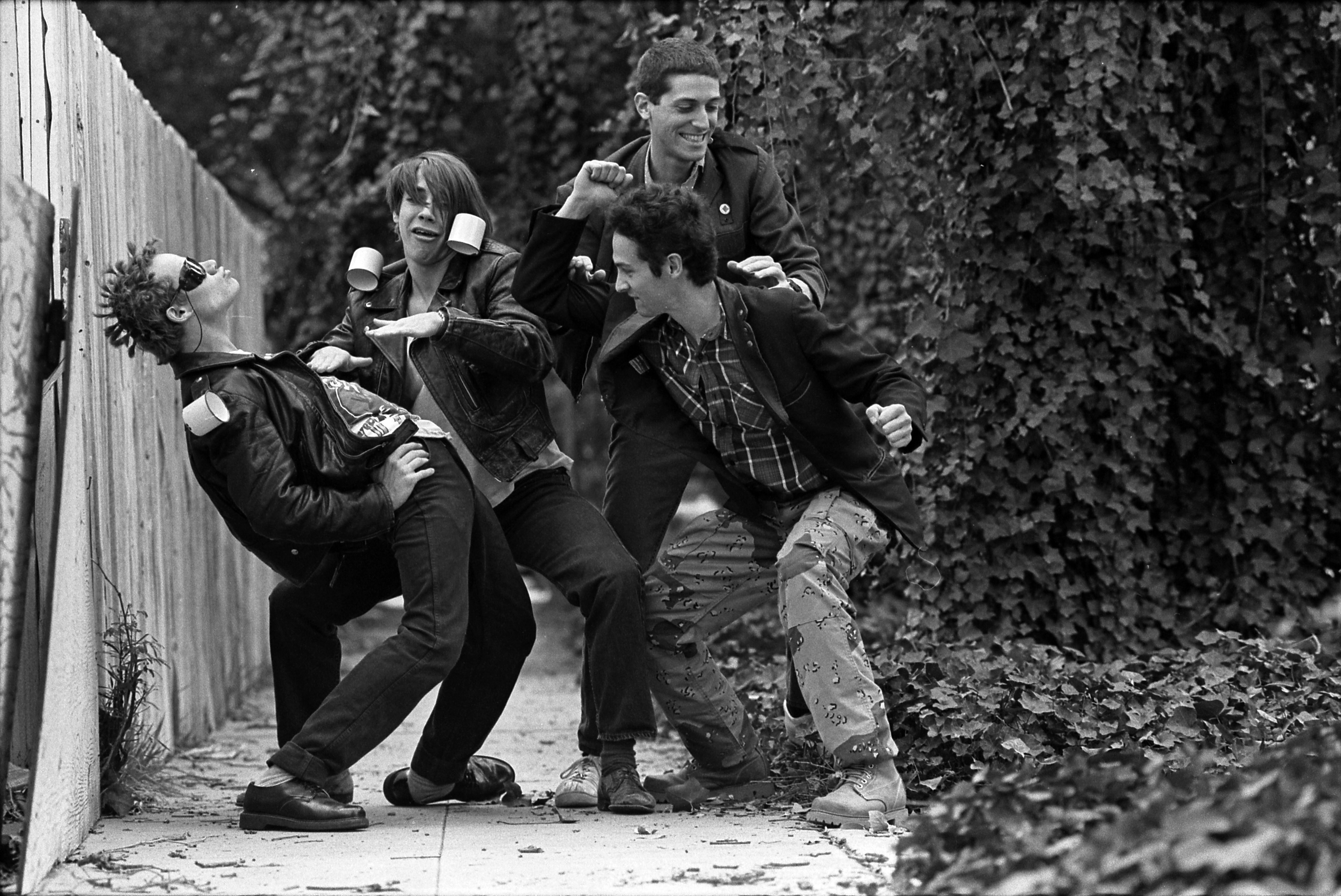
The band in February 1984; from left: Flea, Anthony Kiedis, Jack Sherman and Cliff Martinez

The Red Hot Chili Peppers were formed in Los Angeles in 1982 as Tony Flow and the Miraculously Majestic Masters of Mayhem by singer Anthony Kiedis, guitarist Hillel Slovak, bassist Flea, and drummer Jack Irons, classmates at Fairfax High School. Their first performance was on December 16, 1982, at the Grandia Room club on Hollywood Boulevard to a crowd of approximately 30. Gary Allen, a friend of the band, was hosting a release party for his new EP and asked Kiedis and Flea to put together an opening act.

At the time, Slovak and Irons were already committed to another group, What Is This?; however, the new band was asked to return the following week. In March, they changed their name to the Red Hot Chili Peppers, playing several shows at Los Angeles venues. Six songs from these shows were on the band's first demo tape. In November 1983, manager Lindy Goetz struck a seven-album deal with EMI America and Enigma Records. Two weeks earlier, however, What Is This? had also obtained a record deal with MCA, and in December Slovak and Irons quit the Red Hot Chili Peppers to focus on What Is This?. Flea and Kiedis recruited Weirdos drummer Cliff Martinez and guitarist Jack Sherman.

The band released their debut album, The Red Hot Chili Peppers, in August 1984. Airplay on college radio and MTV helped build a fan base, and the album sold 300,000 copies. Gang of Four guitarist Andy Gill, who produced the album, pushed the band to play with a cleaner, more radio-friendly sound, and the band was disappointed with the result, finding it over-polished. The album included backing vocals by Gwen Dickey, the singer for the 1970s disco funk group Rose Royce. The band embarked on a grueling tour, performing 60 shows in 64 days. During the tour, continuing musical and lifestyle tension between Kiedis and Sherman complicated the transition between concert and daily band life. Sherman was fired in February 1985 and Slovak, who had just quit What Is This?, rejoined the band.

=== 1985–1988: Adding fans, drug abuse, and Slovak's death ===
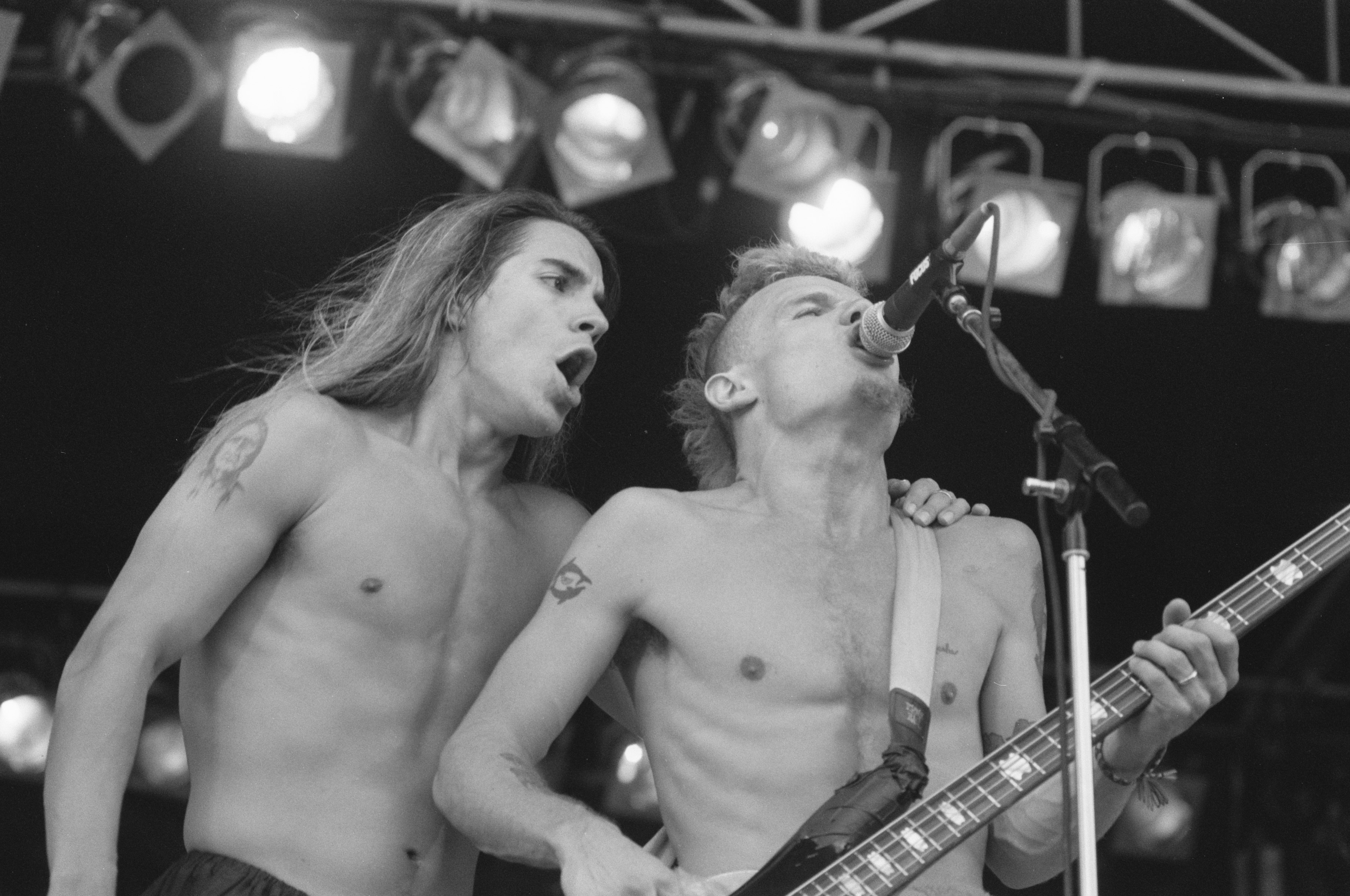
Vocalist Anthony Kiedis and bassist Flea (pictured performing at Uitmarkt in Amsterdam in August 1989) have remained with the Red Hot Chili Peppers through the band's history.

The second Chili Peppers album, Freaky Styley (1985), was produced by funk musician George Clinton, who introduced elements of punk and funk into the band's repertoire. The album featured Maceo Parker and Fred Wesley. The band used heroin while recording the album, which influenced the lyrics and music. The band had a much better relationship with Clinton than with Gill, but Freaky Styley, released on August 16, 1985, also achieved little success, failing to make an impression on any chart. The band also considered the subsequent tour unproductive. Despite the lack of success, the band was satisfied with Freaky Styley; Kiedis reflected that "it so surpassed anything we thought we could have done that we were thinking we were on the road to enormity." Around this time, the band appeared in the 1986 films Thrashin', playing the song "Blackeyed Blonde" from Freaky Styley, and Tough Guys, performing the unreleased song "Set It Straight".

In early 1986, EMI gave the Chili Peppers $5,000 to record a demo tape for their next album. They chose to work with producer Keith Levene from Public Image Ltd, as he shared their interest in drugs. Levene and Slovak put aside $2,000 of the budget to spend on heroin and cocaine, which created tension between the band members. Martinez's "heart was no longer in the band", but he did not quit, so Kiedis and Flea fired him in April 1986. Irons rejoined the band, to their surprise; it marked the first time all four founding members were together since 1983. During the recording and subsequent tour of Freaky Styley, Kiedis and Slovak were dealing with debilitating heroin addictions. Due to his addiction, Kiedis "didn't have the same drive or desire to come up with ideas or lyrics" and appeared at rehearsal "literally asleep".

For their third album, the Chili Peppers attempted to hire Rick Rubin to produce, but he declined due to the band's increasing drug problems. They eventually hired Michael Beinhorn from the art funk project Material, their last choice. The early attempts at recording were halted due to Kiedis' worsening drug problems, and Kiedis was briefly fired. After the band were named "band of the year" by LA Weekly, Kiedis entered drug rehabilitation. The band auditioned new singers, but Kiedis, now sober, rejoined the recording sessions with new enthusiasm. Songs formed quickly, blending the funk feel and rhythms of Freaky Styley with a harder, more immediate approach to punk rock. The album was recorded in the basement of the Capitol Records Building. The recording process was difficult; Kiedis would frequently disappear to seek drugs; after fifty days of sobriety, Kiedis had decided to take drugs again to celebrate his new music.

The third Red Hot Chili Peppers album, The Uplift Mofo Party Plan, was released in September 1987 and peaked at No. 148 on the Billboard 200 chart, a significant improvement over their earlier albums. The band immediately embarked on a two and a half month North American tour to promote the release, accompanied by Faith No More as support who were also promoting their new album Introduce Yourself. During that period, however, Kiedis and Slovak had both developed serious drug addictions, often disappearing for days on end. Slovak died from a heroin overdose on June 25, 1988, soon after the conclusion of the Uplift tour. Kiedis fled the city and did not attend Slovak's funeral. Irons, troubled by the death, left the band; following years of depression, he became a member of the Seattle grunge band Pearl Jam in 1994.

=== 1988–1989: Frusciante and Smith join ===
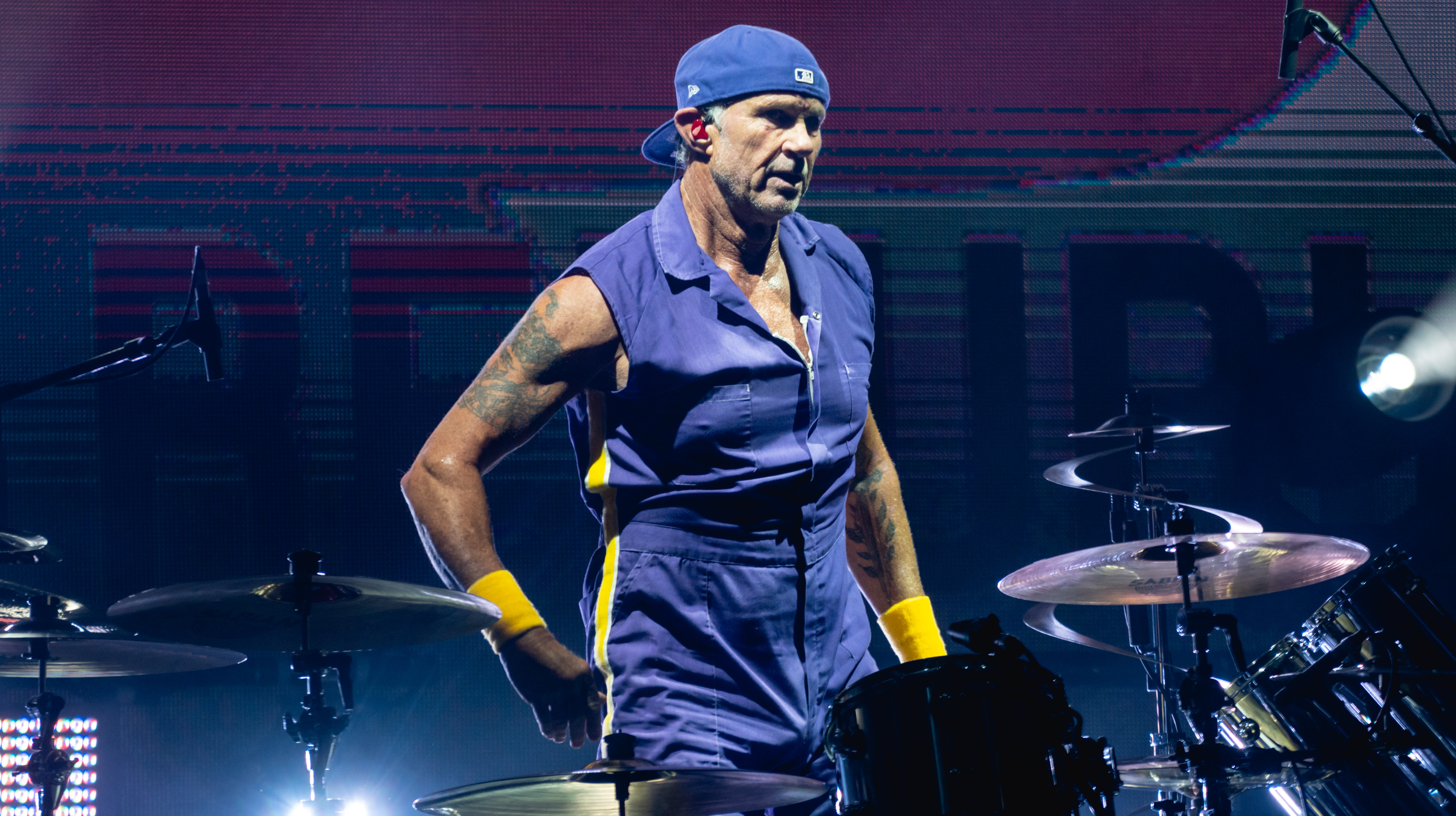
Chad Smith (shown performing with the band for Ohana Festival in Dana Point, California, September 2019) has been the Red Hot Chili Peppers' drummer since 1988.

DeWayne "Blackbyrd" McKnight, a former member of Parliament-Funkadelic, joined as guitarist, and D. H. Peligro of Dead Kennedys joined as drummer in August 1988. Kiedis re-entered rehab for 30 days, and visited Slovak's grave as part of his rehabilitation, finally confronting his grief. Three dates into the tour, McKnight was fired for lack of chemistry with the band. McKnight was so unhappy he threatened to burn down Kiedis' house.

Peligro introduced Kiedis and Flea to the 18-year-old guitarist John Frusciante, a fan of the band, who brought a darker and more melodic style. Frusciante performed his first show with the Chili Peppers in September 1988. The new lineup began writing for the next album and went on a short tour, the Turd Town Tour. In November, Kiedis and Flea fired Peligro due to his drug and alcohol problems. After open auditions, they hired the drummer Chad Smith in December 1988, who has remained since. According to Smith, "We started playing, and right away we just hit it off musically."

The Chili Peppers began work on their fourth album in late 1988. Unlike the stop-start sessions for The Uplift Mofo Party Plan, preproduction went smoothly. However, the sessions were made tense by Beinhorn's desire to create a hit, frustrating Frusciante and Kiedis. Released on August 16, 1989, Mother's Milk peaked at number 52 on the U.S. Billboard 200. The record failed to chart in the United Kingdom and Europe, but climbed to number 33 in Australia. "Knock Me Down" reached number six on the U.S. Modern Rock Tracks chart, whereas "Higher Ground" charted at number eleven and reached number 54 in the UK and 45 in Australia and France. Mother's Milk was certified gold in March 1990 and was the first Chili Peppers album to ship over 500,000 units.

=== 1990–1993: Blood Sugar Sex Magik, fame, and Frusciante's first departure ===
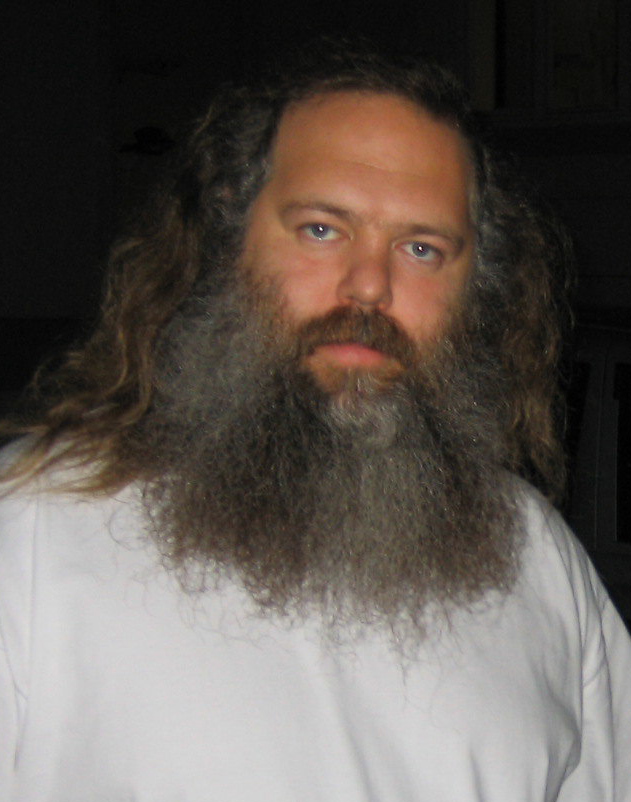
Rick Rubin (pictured in 2006) has produced nearly every Red Hot Chili Peppers album since 1991

In 1990, after the success of Mother's Milk, the Chili Peppers left EMI and entered a major-label bidding war. They signed with Warner Bros. Records and hired Rick Rubin, a producer they had tried to hire before. Rubin turned the band down in 1987 because of their drug problems but he felt that they were now healthier and more focused. He produced several more of their albums. The writing process was more productive than it had been for Mother's Milk, with Kiedis saying, "[every day], there was new music for me to lyricize". At Rubin's suggestion, they recorded in The Mansion, a studio in a house in Laurel Canyon.

In September 1991, Blood Sugar Sex Magik was released. "Give It Away" was the first single, which achieved international fame and became the band's first number-one single on the Modern Rock chart. The ballad "Under the Bridge" was the second single, and reached number two on the Billboard Hot 100 chart, the band's highest position to date. Blood Sugar Sex Magik sold over 12 million copies. It was listed at number 310 on Rolling Stone's list of 500 Greatest Albums of All Time, and in 1992 it rose to number three on the US album charts, almost a year after its release. The album was accompanied by a documentary, Funky Monks. The Chili Peppers began their Blood Sugar Sex Magik tour, which featured Nirvana, Pearl Jam, and Smashing Pumpkins, three of the era's biggest upcoming bands in alternative music, as opening acts.

Frusciante was troubled by fame, and began falling out with Kiedis. He isolated himself and developed a secret heroin addiction. In an appearance on Saturday Night Live, he performed off-key; Kiedis believed he wanted to sabotage the performance. Frusciante abruptly quit after a show in Tokyo in May 1992. He returned to Los Angeles and spent years living in squalor, struggling with addiction. The Chili Peppers contacted Dave Navarro to replace Frusciante. Navarro had just split from Jane's Addiction, but he was involved in drug problems too. After failed auditions with Zander Schloss, they hired Arik Marshall of the Los Angeles band Marshall Law, and headlined the Lollapalooza festival in 1992. Marshall appeared in the music videos for "Breaking the Girl" and "If You Have to Ask", as well as the Simpsons episode "Krusty Gets Kancelled". In September 1992, the Chili Peppers performed "Give It Away" at the MTV Video Music Awards. They were nominated for seven awards, winning three, including Viewer's Choice. In February 1993, they performed "Give It Away" at the Grammy Awards, and the song won the band their first Grammy, Best Hard Rock Performance With Vocal.

The Chili Peppers dismissed Marshall and held auditions for a new guitarist, including Buckethead, whom Flea felt was not right for the band. Jesse Tobias of the Los Angeles band Mother Tongue was briefly hired, but dismissed due to poor chemistry. However, Navarro said he was now ready to join the band. In August 1993, the non-album single "Soul to Squeeze" was released and featured on the soundtrack to the film Coneheads. The song topped the Billboard US Modern Rock chart.

=== 1994–1997: One Hot Minute and Dave Navarro ===
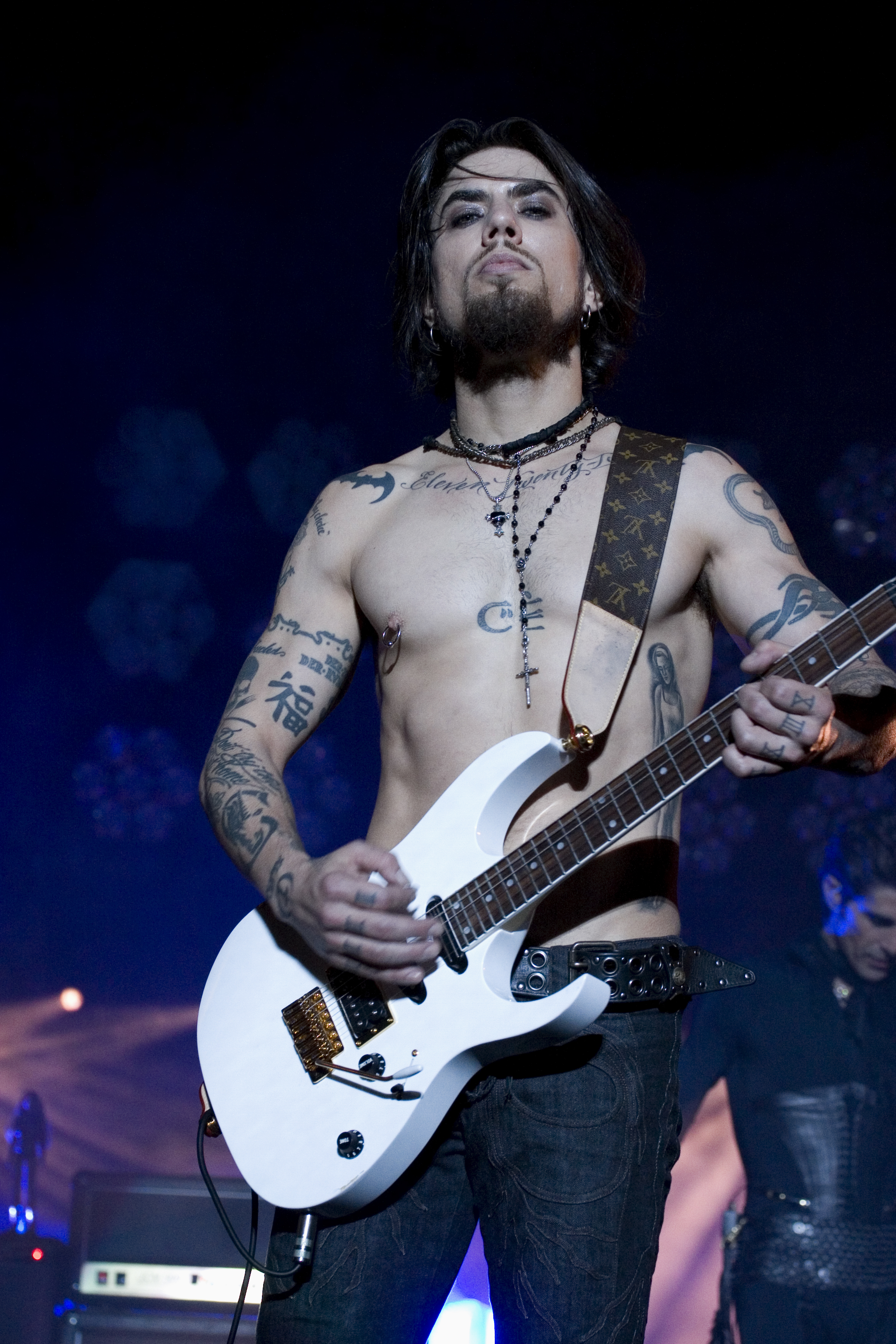
Dave Navarro (pictured performing with Jane's Addiction in 2008) replaced Jesse Tobias in 1993. He left in 1998.

Navarro first appeared with the Chili Peppers at Woodstock '94, performing early versions of new songs. This was followed by a brief tour, including headlining appearances at Pukkelpop and Reading Festivals and two performances as the opening act for the Rolling Stones. The relationship between Navarro and the band began to deteriorate; Navarro admitted he did not care for funk music or jamming. Kiedis had relapsed into heroin addiction following a dental procedure in which an addictive sedative, Valium, was used, though the band did not discover this until later.

Without Frusciante, songs were written at a far slower rate. Kiedis said: "John had been a true anomaly when it came to songwriting... I just figured that was how all guitar players were, that you showed them your lyrics and sang a little bit and the next thing you knew you had a song. That didn't happen right off the bat with Dave."

One Hot Minute was released in September 1995 after several delays. It departed from the Chili Peppers' previous sound, with Navarro's guitar work incorporating heavy metal riffs and psychedelic rock. The band described it as a darker, sadder record. Kiedis's lyrics addressed drugs, including the lead single, "Warped", and broken relationships and deaths of loved ones, including "Tearjerker", written about Kurt Cobain and "Transcending" about River Phoenix. Although it received mixed reviews, the album sold eight million copies worldwide. The band also contributed to soundtracks including Working Class Hero: A Tribute to John Lennon and Beavis and Butt-Head Do America. Flea and Navarro played on Alanis Morissette's single "You Oughta Know".

The Chili Peppers began the tour for One Hot Minute in Europe in 1995. The US tour was postponed after Smith broke his wrist. In 1997, several shows were canceled following deteriorating band relations, injuries, and Navarro and Kiedis' drug use. The band played three shows that year, including the first Fuji Rock Festival in Japan. In April 1998, the Chili Peppers announced that Navarro had left due to creative differences. Kiedis said the decision was mutual. Reports at the time indicated that Navarro's departure came after he attended a band practice under the influence of drugs.

=== 1998–2001: Return of Frusciante and Californication ===
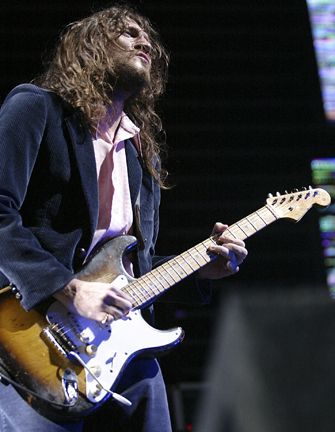
RHCP regained commercial success after guitarist John Frusciante (pictured performing with the band at The Forum in August 2006) rejoined them in 1998. He left again in 2009 and joined once more in 2019.

With no guitarist, the Red Hot Chili Peppers were on the verge of breaking up. In the years following Frusciante's departure, his heroin addiction had left him in poverty and near death. Flea convinced Frusciante to enter Las Encinas Drug Rehabilitation Center in eastern Pasadena, California, in January 1998. His addiction left him with scarring on his arms, a restructured nose, and dental implants following an oral infection. In April 1998, Flea visited the recovered Frusciante and asked him to rejoin the band. Frusciante began sobbing and said nothing would make him happier.

Red Hot Chili Peppers logo

In June 1999, after more than a year of production, the Red Hot Chili Peppers released Californication, their seventh studio album. It sold over 16 million copies, and remains their most successful album. Californication contained fewer rap songs than its predecessors, instead integrating textured and melodic guitar riffs, vocals and basslines. It produced three number-one modern rock hits, "Scar Tissue", "Otherside" and "Californication". Californication received stronger reviews than One Hot Minute, and was a greater success worldwide. While many critics credited the success of the album to Frusciante's return, they also felt Kiedis' vocals had improved. It was later listed at number 399 on the Rolling Stone magazine list of the 500 Greatest Albums of All Time.

Californication was supported with a two-year international world tour, producing the first Chili Peppers concert DVD, Off the Map (2001). In July 1999, the Chili Peppers played the closing show at Woodstock 1999. During the set, a small fire escalated into violence and vandalism, resulting in the intervention of riot control squads. ATMs and several semi-tractor trailers were looted and destroyed. The band was blamed in the media for inciting the riots after performing a cover of the Jimi Hendrix song "Fire". In his memoir, Kiedis wrote: "It was clear that this situation had nothing to do with Woodstock anymore. It wasn't symbolic of peace and love, but of greed and cashing in."

=== 2001–2004: By the Way ===
The Chili Peppers began writing their next album in early 2001, immediately after the Californication tour. Frusciante and Kiedis collaborated for days straight, discussing and sharing guitar progressions and lyrics. For Kiedis, "writing By the Way ... was a whole different experience from Californication. John was back to himself and brimming with confidence." The recording was difficult for Flea, who felt his role was being diminished and fought with Frusciante about the musical direction. Flea considered quitting the band after the album, but the two worked out their problems.

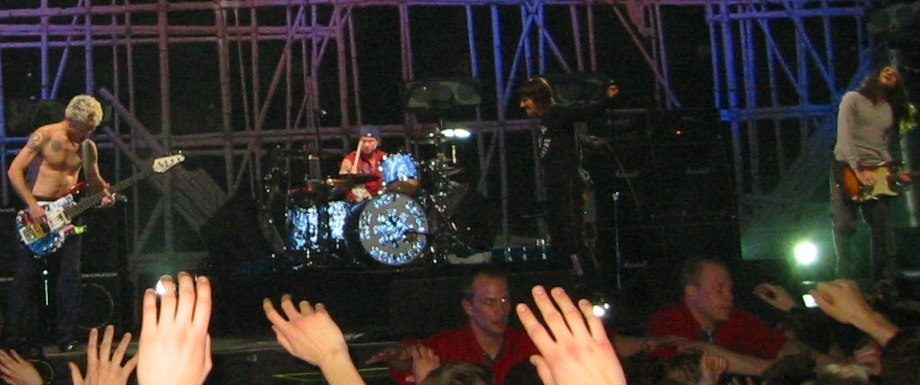
Red Hot Chili Peppers performing in Stockholm in 2003

By the Way was released in July 2002 and produced four singles; "By the Way", "The Zephyr Song", "Can't Stop" and "Universally Speaking". The album was their most subdued to date, focusing on melodic ballads over rap and funk, with layered textures, more keyboards, and string arrangements. The album was followed by an eighteen-month world tour, a concert DVD, Live at Slane Castle, and the band's first live album, Red Hot Chili Peppers Live in Hyde Park. More than 258,000 fans paid over $17,100,000 for tickets over three nights, a 2004 record; the event ranked No. 1 on Billboard's Top Concert Boxscores of 2004. In November 2003, the Chili Peppers released their Greatest Hits album, which featured new songs "Fortune Faded" and "Save the Population".

=== 2005–2007: Stadium Arcadium ===
In 2006, the Chili Peppers released their ninth album, Stadium Arcadium. Although they initially planned to release a trilogy of albums, they chose to release a 28-track double album. It was their first album to debut at number one on the US charts, where it stayed for two weeks, and debuted at number one in the UK and 25 other countries. Stadium Arcadium sold over seven million units. It won the Grammys for Best Rock Album and Best Rock Performance by a Duo Or Group With Vocal ("Dani California").

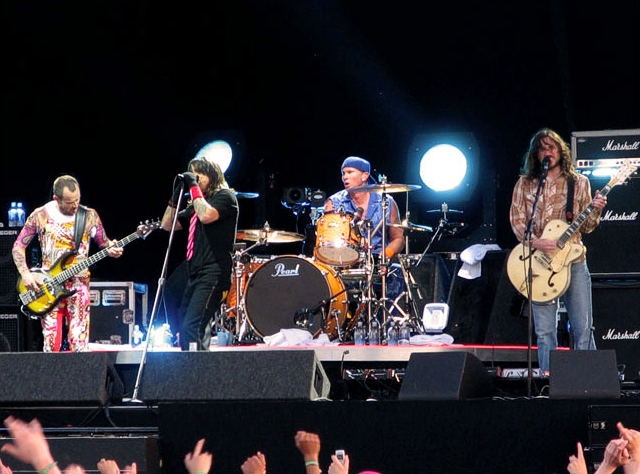
Red Hot Chili Peppers performing at the Pinkpop Festival in Landgraaf, The Netherlands, June 2006

The first single, "Dani California", was the band's fastest-selling single, debuting on top of the Modern Rock chart in the U.S., peaking at number six on the Billboard Hot 100, and reaching number 2 in the UK. "Tell Me Baby", released next, also topped the charts in 2006. "Snow (Hey Oh)" was released in late 2006, breaking multiple records by 2007. The song became their eleventh number-one single, giving the band a cumulative total of 81 weeks at number one. It was also the first time three consecutive singles by the band made it to number one. "Desecration Smile" was released internationally in February 2007 and reached number 27 on the UK charts. "Hump de Bump" was planned to be the next single for the US, Canada, and Australia only, but due to positive feedback from the music video, it was released as a worldwide single in May 2007.

The Stadium Arcadium World Tour began in 2006, including several festival dates. Frusciante's friend and frequent musical collaborator Josh Klinghoffer joined the touring band, contributing guitar, backing vocals, and keyboards. The band was a musical guest for Saturday Night Live in May 2006 and Tom Hanks hosted the show.

=== 2008–2009: Klinghoffer replaces Frusciante ===
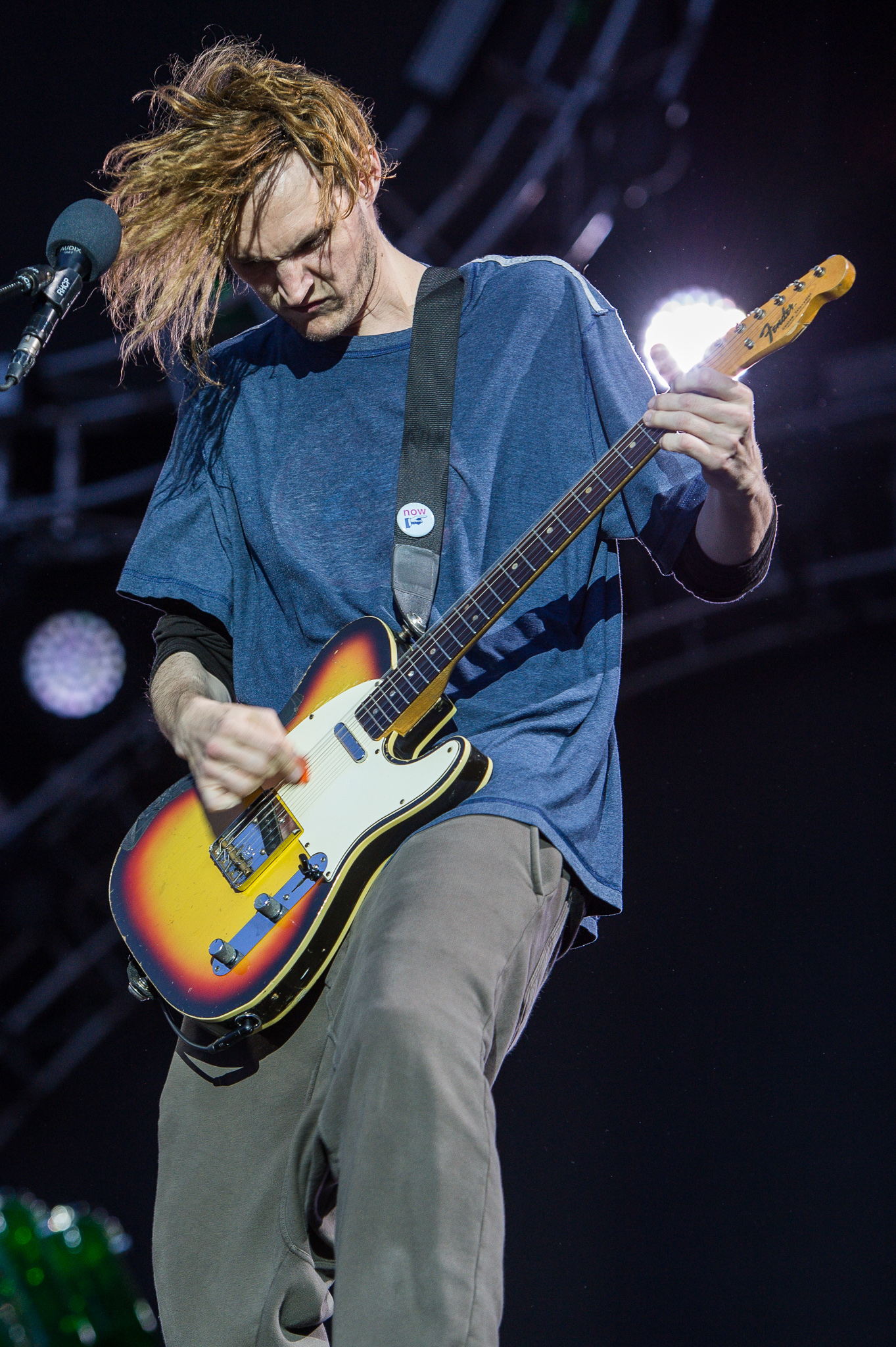
Josh Klinghoffer (pictured in 2016) was the backup touring guitarist in 2007. He replaced John Frusciante in 2009, until Frusciante's return in 2019.

After the Stadium Arcadium tour, the Chili Peppers took an extended break. Kiedis attributed this to the band being worn out from their years of nonstop work since Californication. Their only recording during that time was in 2008 with George Clinton on his album George Clinton and His Gangsters of Love; accompanied by Kim Manning, they recorded a new version of Shirley and Lee's classic "Let the Good Times Roll".

Kiedis, who had recently become a father, planned to spend the time taking care of his son and developing a television series based on his autobiography, Spider and Son. Flea began taking music theory classes at the University of Southern California, and revealed plans to release a mainly instrumental solo record; guest musicians included Patti Smith and a choir from the Silverlake Conservatory of Music. He also joined Thom Yorke in the supergroup Atoms for Peace. Frusciante released his album The Empyrean. Smith worked with Sammy Hagar, Joe Satriani, and Michael Anthony in the supergroup Chickenfoot, as well as on his solo project, Chad Smith's Bombastic Meatbats.

In July 2009, Frusciante again left the Chili Peppers, though no announcement was made until December. Frusciante explained on his Myspace page that there was no ill feeling about his departure this time, and that he wanted to focus on his solo work. In October 2009, the Chili Peppers entered the studio to begin writing their tenth studio album, with Klinghoffer replacing Frusciante. In January 2010, the Chili Peppers made their live comeback in January 2010, paying tribute to Neil Young with a cover of "A Man Needs a Maid" at MusiCares. In February, after months of speculation, Klinghoffer was confirmed as Frusciante's replacement.

=== 2011–2014: I'm with You ===
Red Hot Chili Peppers recorded their tenth album, I'm with You, between September 2010 and March 2011. They decided against releasing another double album, reducing the album to 14 tracks. I'm with You was released in the US in August 2011. It topped the charts in 18 countries, and received mostly positive reviews. "The Adventures of Rain Dance Maggie", became the band's 12th number-one single. "Monarchy of Roses", "Look Around" and "Did I Let You Know" (released only in Brazil), and "Brendan's Death Song" were also released as singles.

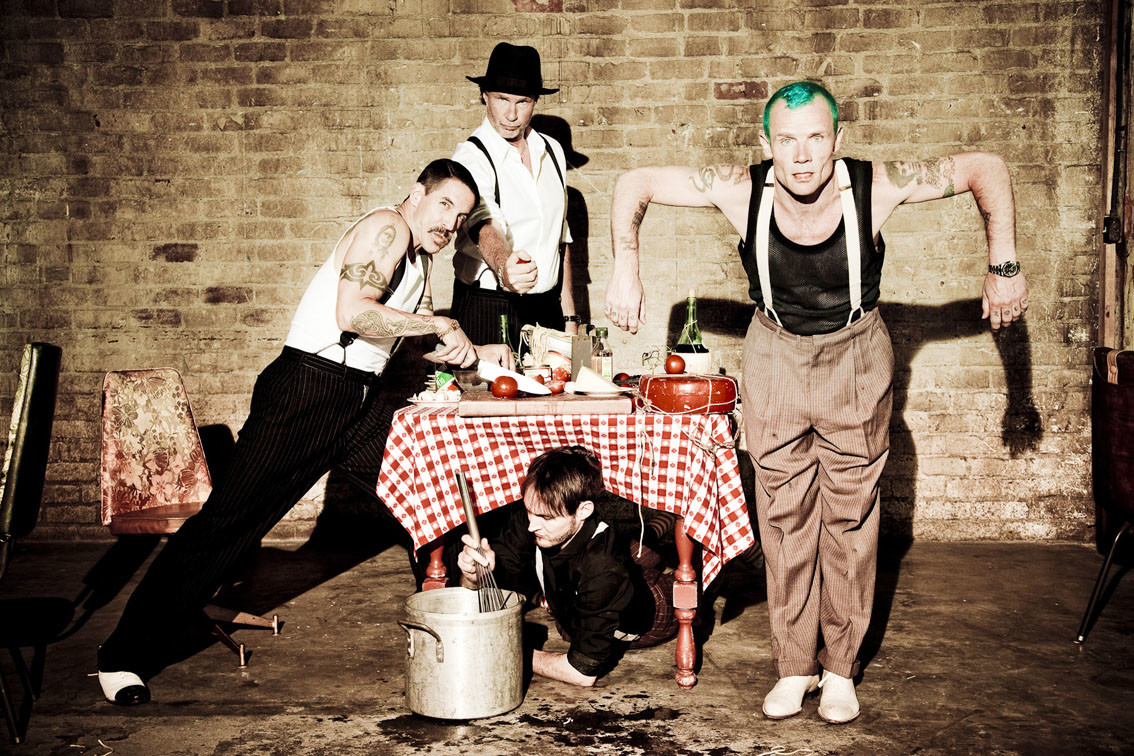
A 2012 promotional image of the Red Hot Chili Peppers

In July 2011, the Chili Peppers played three invitation-only warm-up shows in California, their first since 2007. They began a month-long promotional tour in August 2011, starting in Asia. The I'm with You World Tour ran from September 2011 until 2013. The North American leg, expected to begin in January 2012, was postponed to March due to a surgery Kiedis required for foot injuries he had sustained during the Stadium Arcadium tour. After the I'm with You World Tour, the band set out on another small tour, including their first shows in Alaska, Paraguay, the Philippines, and Puerto Rico. Recordings from the tours were released in 2012 on the free 2011 Live EP.

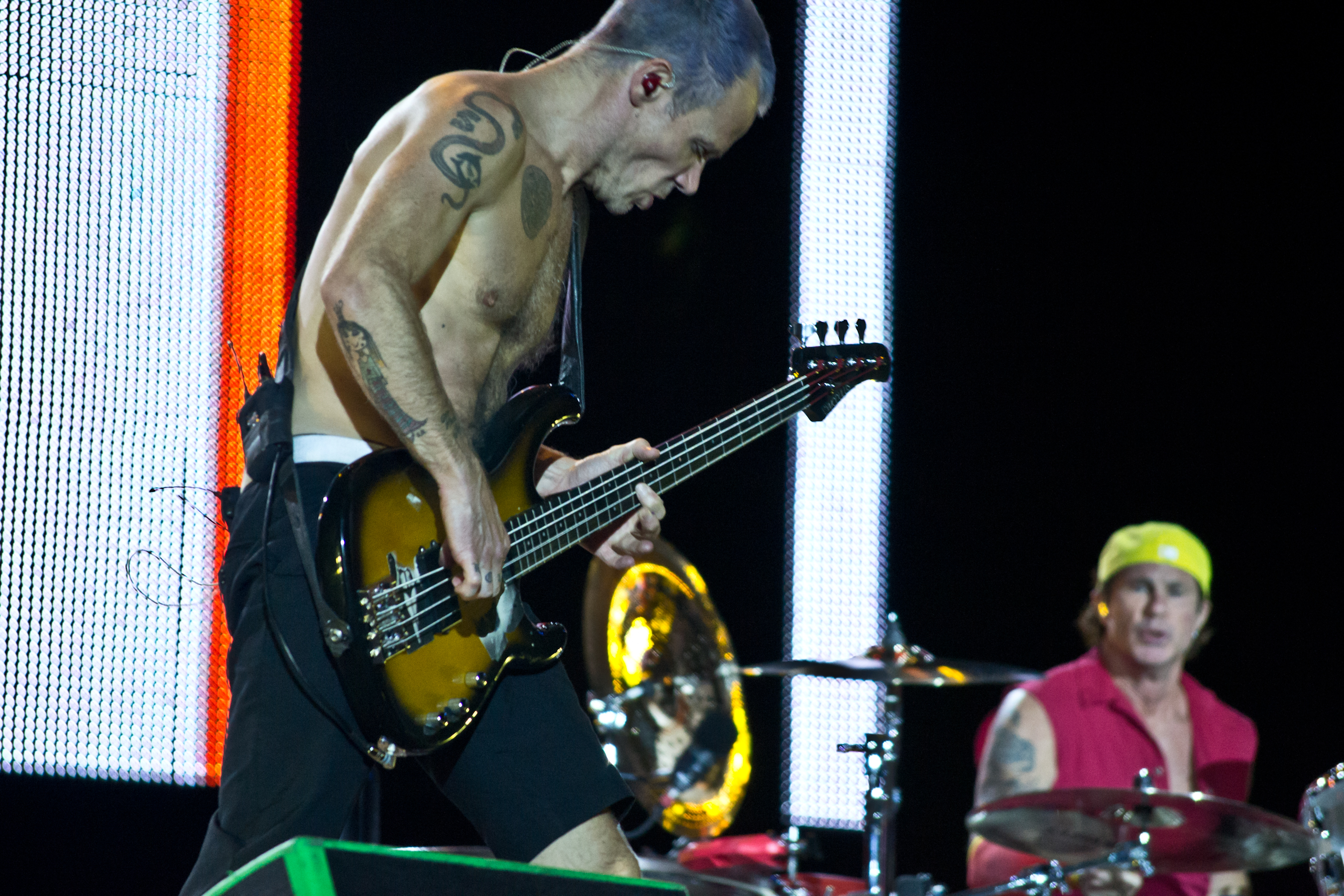
Flea and Smith at Rock in Rio in Madrid, July 2012

The Chili Peppers were nominated for two MTV Europe Music Awards for Best Rock Band and Best Live Artist and nominated for Best Group at the 2012 People's Choice Awards I'm with You was also nominated for a 2012 Grammy Award for Best Rock Album. In April 2012, the Chili Peppers were inducted into the Rock and Roll Hall of Fame. A month later Rock & Roll Hall of Fame Covers EP, was released for downloads only, consisting of previously released studio and live covers of artists which had influenced the band. From August 2012, the band began releasing a series of singles as the I'm with You Sessions, which were compiled on the I'm Beside You LP in November 2013 as a Record Store Day exclusive.

In February 2014, the Chili Peppers joined Bruno Mars as performers at the Super Bowl XLVIII half-time show, watched by a record 115.3 million viewers. The performance was met with mixed reviews for its use of backing music; Flea responded that it was an NFL rule for bands to pre-record music due to time and technical issues, and that they had agreed because it was a once-in-a-lifetime opportunity. He said Kiedis' vocals were completely live and the band had recorded "Give it Away" during rehearsals. The band began another tour in May 2013, which ended in June 2014. 2012-13 Live EP was released in July 2014 through their website as a free download.

=== 2015–2018: The Getaway ===
The Chili Peppers released Fandemonium in November 2014, a book dedicated to their fans. In December 2014, they began work on their eleventh album, their first without producer Rick Rubin since 1989; instead it was produced by Danger Mouse. Flea broke his arm during a skiing trip, which delayed the recording for several months. "Dark Necessities", the first single from their upcoming album, was released on May 5. Their eleventh album, The Getaway, was released in June. Kiedis said that the songs were influenced by a two-year relationship that fell apart. "Dark Necessities" became the band's 25th top-ten single on the Billboard Alternative Songs chart, a record they hold over U2. In February 2016, "Circle of the Noose", an unreleased song recorded with Navarro in 1998, was leaked.

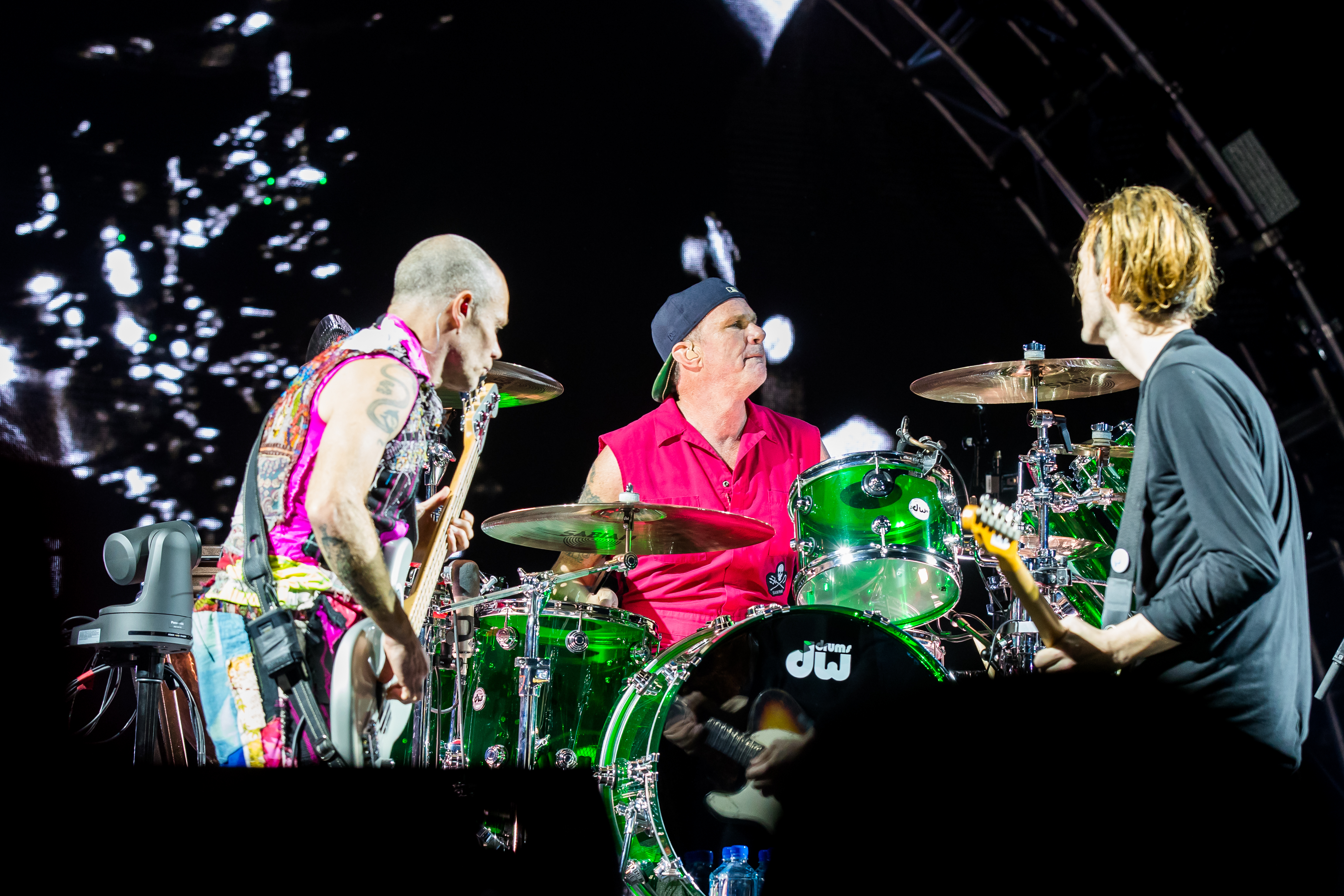
The Red Hot Chili Peppers performing at Rock am Ring in Mendig, Germany, June 2016

In May, the band released "The Getaway". The music video for "Dark Necessities", directed by actress Olivia Wilde, was released in June 2016. The Getaway made its debut at number 2 on the Billboard 200 chart, behind Drake, who had the number-one album for eight consecutive weeks. The Getaway outsold Drake its opening week with album sales of 108,000 to 33,000 (actually placing him at 4th in sales for the week) though due to album streaming, Drake managed to top the band for the top position in the charts. In July 2016, the Live In Paris EP was released exclusively through the music streaming website Deezer. "Go Robot" was announced as the second single from The Getaway. In the same month, the band members started to post images from the set of the music video. The Getaway was reissued on limited edition pink vinyl in September, as part of 10 Bands 1 Cause. All money from sales of the re-issue went to Gilda's Club NYC an organization that provides community support for both those diagnosed with cancer and their caretakers. It is named after comedian Gilda Radner.

The band began the headlining portion of the Getaway World Tour in September with the North American leg, featuring Jack Irons, the band's original drummer, as an opening act, beginning in January 2017. Dave Rat, the band's sound engineer since 1991, announced that after the show of January 22, 2017, he would no longer be working with the band.

The Getaway World Tour concluded in October 2017. The tour consisted of 151 shows lasting a year and almost five months. In December, the band headlined the Band Together 2 Benefit Concert at the Bill Graham Civic Auditorium in San Francisco. Money raised from the concert went to the Tipping Point Emergency Relief Fund which between 2005 and 2017 raised $150 million to educate, employ, house and support those in need in the Bay Area.

=== 2019–2023: Frusciante's second return, Unlimited Love, and Return of the Dream Canteen ===
The recording of the next Chili Peppers album was delayed due to the Woolsey Fire; the band performed a benefit show for fire victims on January 13, 2019. In February, they performed "Dark Necessities" with rapper Post Malone at the 61st Annual Grammy Awards. They appeared in Malone's music video for "Wow", released in March.

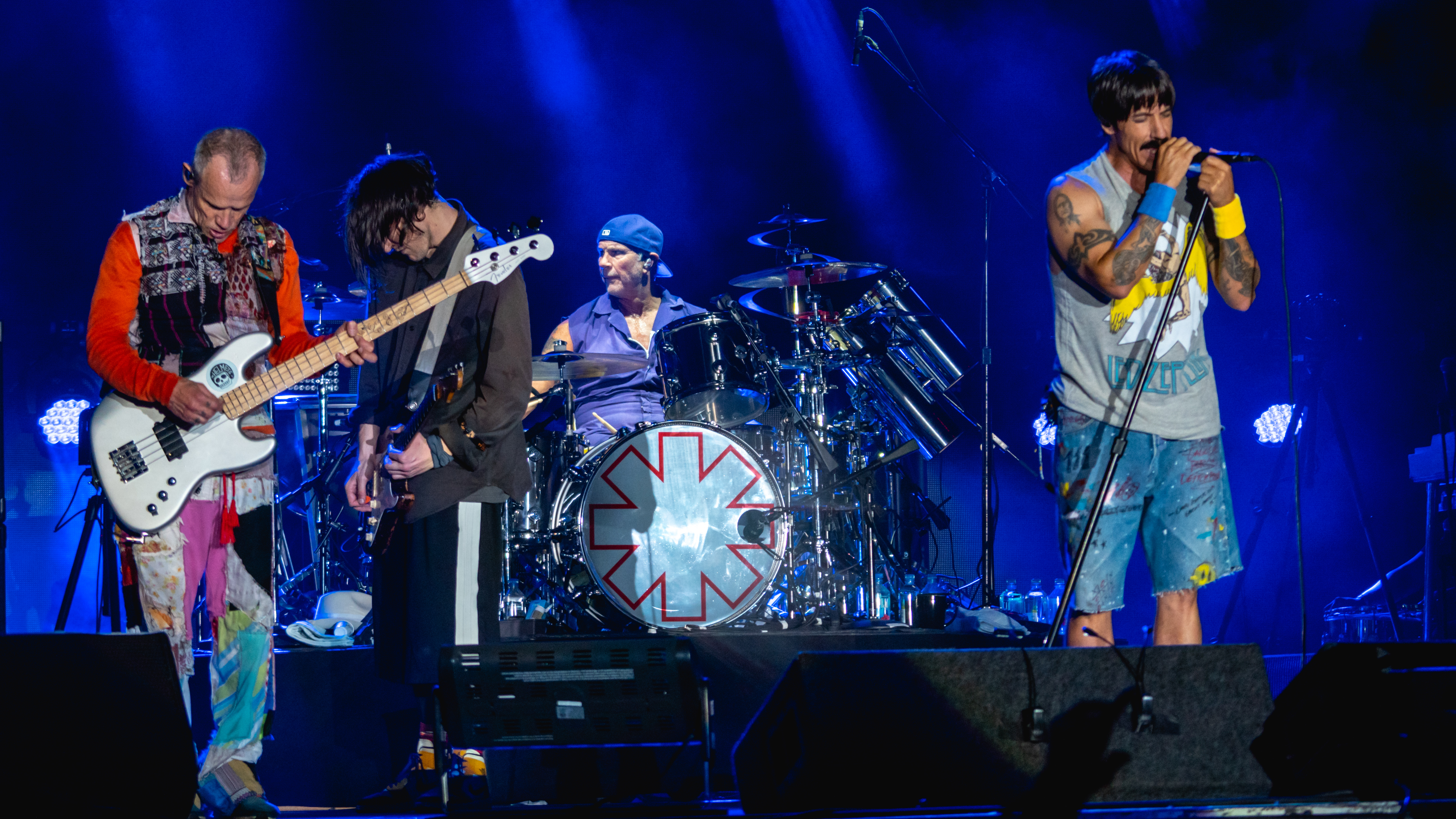
Red Hot Chili Peppers performing at the Ohana Music Festival in September 2019, three months before Klinghoffer was replaced by Frusciante

In February 2019, the Chili Peppers began a month-long tour, featuring their first headlining shows in Australia in 12 years, including their first show in Tasmania, which was briefly halted due to a power outage. On March 15, they performed in Egypt, becoming one of the few acts allowed to perform at the Pyramids of Giza. The performance was livestreamed. On October 26, David Mushegain, a photographer, announced that a Chili Peppers documentary was in the works.

On December 15, 2019, the Chili Peppers announced that after 10 years, Frusciante had rejoined, replacing Klinghoffer. They wrote that Klinghoffer was "a beautiful musician who we respect and love". In an interview, Klinghoffer said there was no animosity: "It's absolutely John's place to be in that band... I'm happy that he's back with them." On November 2, the Chili Peppers performed their final show with Klinghoffer, at a charity event at the Silverlake Conservatory of Music in Los Angeles. Klinghoffer released his debut solo album, To Be One with You, on November 22, 2019, featuring Flea and the former Chili Peppers drummer Jack Irons. On February 8, 2020, Frusciante performed with the Chili Peppers for the first time in 13 years at a memorial service held by the Tony Hawk Foundation for the film producer Andrew Burkle, the son of billionaire Ronald Burkle. Shows were scheduled for three festivals that May, but were canceled due to the COVID-19 pandemic. In August, the former Chili Peppers guitarist Jack Sherman died aged 64; the band released a statement thanking him for "all times good, bad and in between".

On April 24, 2021, the Chili Peppers announced that they had left Q Prime, their management company for the previous 20 years, and they would be managed by their longtime friend Guy Oseary, founder of Maverick Records. On May 3, it was reported that the Red Hot Chili Peppers would sell their back catalog to Hipgnosis Songs Fund for $140–$150 million. On March 31, the Chili Peppers received a star on the Hollywood Walk of Fame.

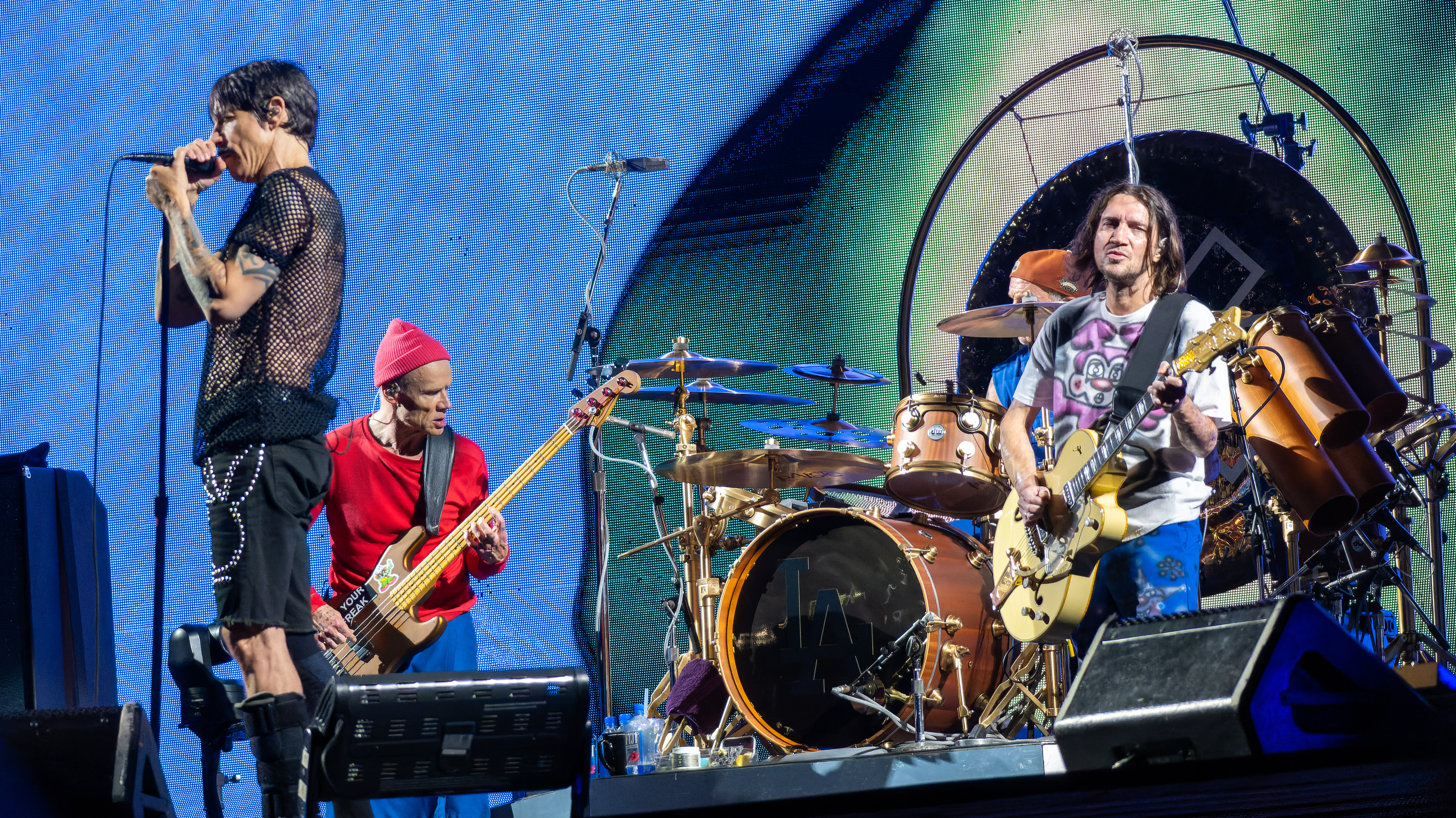
The band performing at Tottenham Hotspur Stadium in London, July 2023

The 12th Red Hot Chili Peppers album, Unlimited Love, produced by Rubin, was released on April 1, 2022. It debuted at number one in ten countries, becoming the first US number-one Chili Peppers album since Stadium Arcadium. It was promoted with the singles "Black Summer" and "These Are the Ways". NME wrote that Unlimited Love shared the "melancholic riffmaking, anthemic choruses and softly-sung melodies" of Frusciante's previous work with the Chili Peppers, but introduced new "grungy" and acoustic elements.

On the day of the release, the broadcasting company SiriusXM launched a dedicated Red Hot Chili Peppers channel, Whole Lotta Red Hot, featuring music videos, live performances and acts that influenced the Chili Peppers. On June 4, the Red Hot Chili Peppers began their Unlimited Love Tour. The 13th Chili Peppers album, Return of the Dream Canteen, recorded during the same sessions as Unlimited Love, was released on October 14. The first single, "Tippa My Tongue", was released in August, followed by "The Drummer" in October. The band's former drummer D.H. Peligro died at the age of 63 on October 28.

=== 2024–present: Upcoming fourteenth album and documentary ===
In April 2024, Chad Smith said that the Chili Peppers would take a break following their 2024 tour dates, and would start writing their next album in 2025. For the closing ceremony of the 2024 Paris Olympics on August 11, the Chili Peppers provided a performance of "Can't Stop" ("Eddie" was performed during a post-Olympics special on NBC) in Long Beach, California, representing Los Angeles, where the 2028 Summer Olympics will be held. On January 30, 2025, the Red Hot Chili Peppers performed at the FireAid benefit concert at the Kia Forum. The band appeared as marionettes in an episode of the Netflix animated series Love, Death & Robots, directed by David Fincher, which aired on May 15.

On May 16, 2025, it was reported by Deadline that a documentary on the band's formative years was being secretly screened at the Cannes Film Festival, and was looking for select buyers in both New York and Los Angeles. The documentary, co-produced by Hillel Slovak's brother James, will reportedly center on the childhood bond between Kiedis, Flea and Slovak, will feature interviews from current and former band members. Netflix is scheduled to release the documentary, The Rise of the Red Hot Chili Peppers: Our Brother, Hillel, about Slovak and the impact he had on their early years and career. On January 31, 2026, the band members said they appeared in the documentary "out of love and respect for Hillel".

On July 24, 2025, Flea confirmed that the Chili Peppers were working on new music. Flea released his debut solo album, Honora, in March 2026. On May 9, 2026, it was announced that the Chili Peppers had sold their music catalog for $300 million to Warner Music Group. In an interview with GQ published in August, Kiedis said the Chili Peppers planned to reunite soon: "We're going to be just as creatively potent as we were in the '80s when we first met ... They're still curious and fascinated and want to be better and want to write better songs. I'm proud we didn't get lame and bored and meaningless."

On 17 October, the Chili Peppers performed at a benefit show at the Hollywood Palladium to celebrate the 25th anniversary of the Silverlake Conservatory of Music. On November 14, they gave a surprise performance of "Give It Away" to honor Rubin's induction into the Rock and Roll Hall of Fame. They wore matching beards, wigs and sunglasses resembling Rubin.

== Artistry ==
=== Musical style and influences ===
The music of the Red Hot Chili Peppers has been characterized as funk rock, alternative rock, funk metal, and rap rock, with influences from hard, psychedelic, and punk rock. Regarding their genre, Flea stated in a 2006 Guitar World interview, "For all the styles that have come and gone through-out our career, we never really aligned ourselves with any of them; we were never part of any movement. At one time, people put us together in a category with Fishbone and Faith No More, but we were always different from those bands, and they were always different from us." The band's influences include Parliament-Funkadelic, Defunkt, Jimi Hendrix, the Misfits, Black Sabbath, Metallica, James Brown, Gang of Four, Bob Marley, Big Boys, Bad Brains, Sly and the Family Stone, Ohio Players, Queen, Stevie Wonder, Elvis Presley, Deep Purple, the Beach Boys, Black Flag, Ornette Coleman, Led Zeppelin, Yes, Fugazi, Fishbone, Marvin Gaye, Billie Holiday, Santana, Elvis Costello, the Stooges, the Clash, Siouxsie and the Banshees, Devo, and Miles Davis.

=== Vocals and instrumentation ===
Kiedis provided multiple vocal styles. His primary approach up to Blood Sugar Sex Magik was spoken verse and rapping, which he complemented with traditional vocals. This helped the band to maintain a consistent style. As the group matured, notably with Californication (1999), they reduced the number of rapped verses. By the Way (2002) contained only two songs with a rap-driven verse and melodic chorus. Kiedis' more recent style was developed through ongoing coaching.

Original guitarist Slovak's style was based in blues and funk. Slovak was primarily influenced by hard-rock artists such as Hendrix, Kiss and Led Zeppelin, while his playing method was based on improvisation common in funk. He was noted for an aggressive playing style; he would often play with such force, that his fingers would "come apart". Kiedis observed that his playing evolved during his time away from the group in What Is This?, when Slovak adopted a more fluid style featuring "sultry" elements compared to his earlier hard-rock techniques. On The Uplift Mofo Party Plan (1987), Slovak experimented with genres outside of traditional funk music including reggae and speed metal. His guitar riffs often served as the basis of the group's songs, with the other members writing their parts to complement his guitar work. His melodic riff featured in the song "Behind the Sun" inspired the group to create "pretty" songs with an emphasis on melody. Kiedis describes the song as "pure Hillel inspiration". Slovak also used a talk box on songs such as "Green Heaven" and "Funky Crime", in which he would sing into a tube while playing to create psychedelic effects.

Frusciante's guitar playing style has evolved over the course of his career, with a technique that employs melody and emotion rather than virtuosity. Although virtuoso influences can be heard throughout his career, he has said that he often minimizes this. Frusciante brought a melodic and textured sound, notably on Californication, By the Way, and Stadium Arcadium (2006). This contrasts with his earlier abrasive approach in Mother's Milk, as well as his dry, funky and more docile arrangements on Blood Sugar Sex Magik. On Californication and By the Way, Frusciante derived the technique of creating tonal texture through chord patterns from post-punk guitarist Vini Reilly of the Durutti Column, and bands such as Fugazi and the Cure. On By the Way, he wanted people to be able to sing the lead guitar part, influenced by John McGeoch of Siouxsie and the Banshees, Johnny Marr of the Smiths, and Bernard Sumner of Joy Division. He initially wanted this album to be composed of "these punky, rough songs", drawing inspiration from early punk artists such as the Germs and the Damned, an English band. However, that was discouraged by Rubin, the producer. Instead he built on Californication's melodically driven style. During the recording of Stadium Arcadium (2006), he moved away from his new-wave influences and concentrated on emulating flashier guitar players such as Hendrix and Van Halen. Navarro brought his own sound to the band during his tenure, with his style based on heavy metal, progressive rock, and psychedelia.

Flea's bass guitar style can be considered an amalgamation of funk, psychedelic, punk, and hard rock. The groove-heavy melodies, played through either finger-picking or slapping, contributed to their signature style. While Flea's slap bass style was prominent in earlier albums, albums after Blood Sugar Sex Magik have more melodic and funk-driven bass lines. He has also used double stops on some newer songs. Flea's bass playing has changed considerably throughout the years. When he joined Fear, his technique centered largely around traditional punk-rock bass lines. However, he changed this style when the Red Hot Chili Peppers formed. He began to incorporate a "slap" bass style that drew influence largely from Bootsy Collins. Blood Sugar Sex Magik saw a notable shift in style as it featured none of his signature technique but focused more on traditional and melodic roots. His intellectual beliefs as a musician also shifted: "I was trying to play simply on Blood Sugar Sex Magik because I had been playing too much prior to that, so I thought, 'I've really got to chill out and play half as many notes'. When you play less, it's more exciting—there's more room for everything. If I do play something busy, it stands out, instead of the bass being a constant onslaught of notes. Space is good."

Drummer Smith blends rock with funk, mixing metal and jazz to his beats. Influences include Buddy Rich and John Bonham. He brought a different sound to Mother's Milk, playing tight and fast. In Blood Sugar Sex Magik, he displays greater power. He is recognized for his ghost notes, his beats and his fast right foot. MusicRadar put him in sixth place on their list of the "50 Greatest Drummers Of All Time". During their early career, the Chili Peppers often performed nude, wearing only socks over their genitals; that became a part of their stage persona and brought them early notoriety.

=== Lyrical themes and inspirations ===
Early in the group's history, Kiedis wrote comical songs filled with sexual innuendos and songs inspired by friendship and the band members' personal experiences. However, after the death of his close friend and bandmate Hillel Slovak, Kiedis' lyrics became much more introspective and personal, as exemplified by the Mother's Milk song "Knock Me Down", which was dedicated to Slovak along with the Blood Sugar Sex Magik song "My Lovely Man". When the band recorded One Hot Minute (1995), Kiedis had turned to drugs once again, which resulted in darker lyrics. He began to write about anguish, and the self-mutilating thoughts he experienced as a result of his drug addiction. The album also featured tributes to close friends the band lost during the recording process including Kurt Cobain on the song "Tearjerker" and River Phoenix on the song "Transcending".

After witnessing Frusciante's recovery from his heroin addiction, Kiedis wrote many songs inspired by rebirth and the meaning of life on Californication. He was also intrigued by the life lessons that the band had learned, including Kiedis' experience with meeting a young mother at the YMCA, who was attempting to battle her crack addiction while living with her infant daughter.

On By the Way, Kiedis was lyrically influenced by love and his girlfriend. Drugs also played an integral part in Kiedis' writings, as he had only been sober since 2000. Tracks such as "This Is the Place" and "Don't Forget Me" expressed his intense dislike for narcotics and the harmful physical and emotional effects they caused him. Stadium Arcadium (2006) continued the themes of love and romance; Kiedis said, that "love and women, pregnancies and marriages, relationship struggles—those are real and profound influences on this record. And it's great, because it wasn't just me writing about the fact that I'm in love. It was everybody in the band. We were brimming with energy based on falling in love." I'm with You (2011) again featured Kiedis writing about the loss of a close friend, this time in the song "Brendan's Death Song", a tribute to club owner Brendan Mullen who gave the band some of their earliest shows and showed support to them throughout their career.

Themes within Kiedis' repertoire include love and friendship, teenage angst, good-time aggression, various sexual topics and the link between sex and music, political and social commentary (Native American issues in particular), romance, loneliness, globalization and the cons of fame and Hollywood, poverty, drugs, alcohol, dealing with death, and California.

== Legacy and influence ==
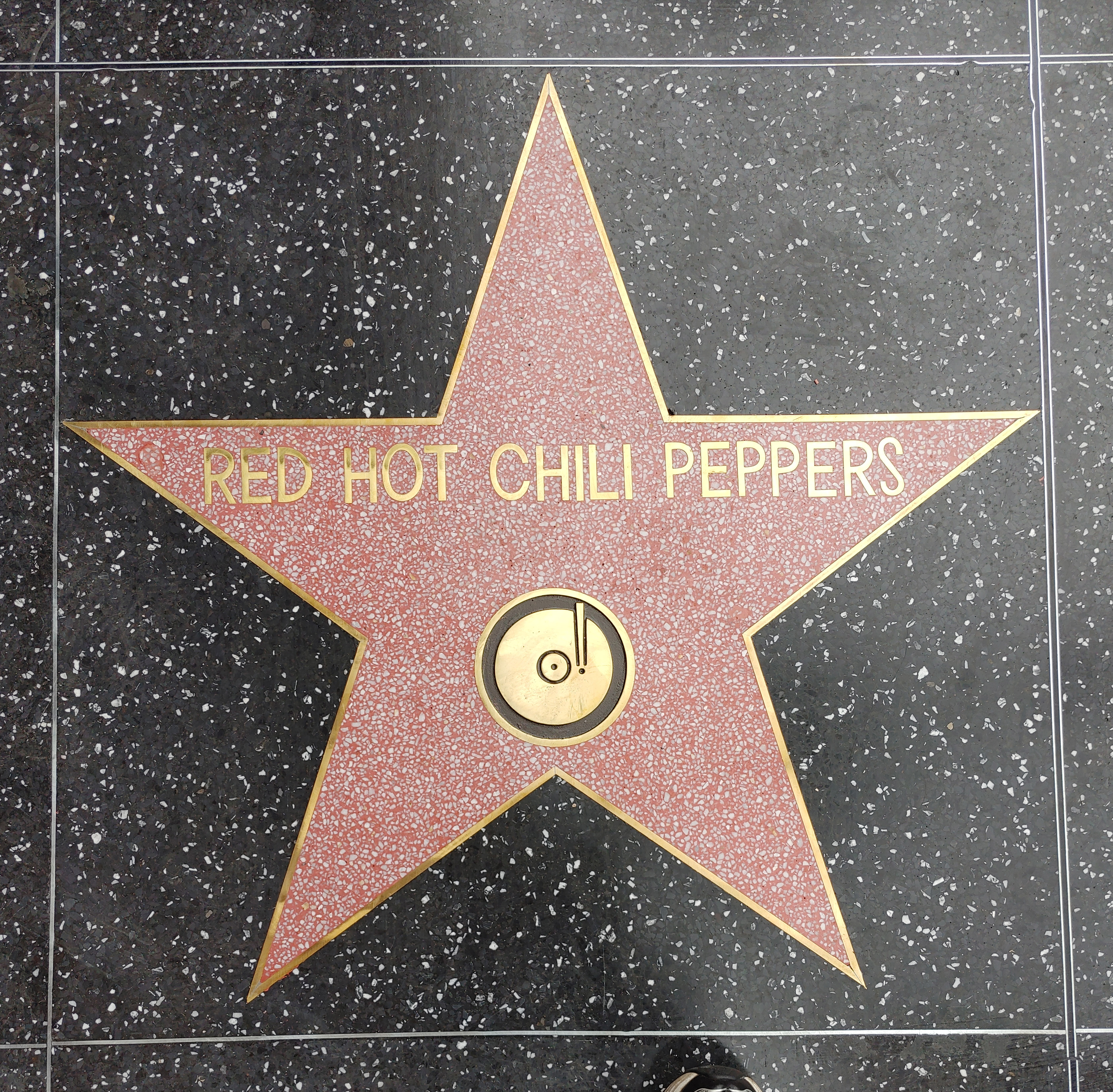
The Red Hot Chili Peppers' star on the Hollywood Walk of Fame, unveiled in March 2022

The Red Hot Chili Peppers' mix of hard rock, funk and hip-hop has influenced genres such as funk metal, rap metal, rap rock, and nu metal. According to AllMusic, in 1992, "oodles of (mostly horribly bad) funk-metal acts were following in Faith No More and the Red Hot Chili Peppers' footsteps". Bands who have cited the Red Hot Chili Peppers as an influence include Incubus, Mr. Bungle, Primus, Rage Against the Machine, System of a Down, Papa Roach, 311, Sugar Ray and Korn.

Kiedis said the Red Hot Chili Peppers were early to combine "hardcore funk and hip-hop-style vocals", and suggested that they had influenced Limp Bizkit, Kid Rock and Linkin Park. Smith said the Chili Peppers had an easily identifiable style no matter how they played, and was proud of their "strong personality".

In 2004, the Australian songwriter Nick Cave said: "I'm forever near a stereo saying, 'What the fuck is this garbage?' And the answer is always the Red Hot Chili Peppers." The line is widely quoted in criticism of the band; Flea, a fan of Cave, wrote that it had hurt him. In 2025, Cave wrote an apology on his website, saying it was "an offhand and somewhat uncharitable remark" with "no malice intended". He contributed to Flea's debut solo album, Honora (2026).

== Awards and recognition ==
The Red Hot Chili Peppers were inducted into the Rock and Roll Hall of Fame in April 2012. The induction lineup was Kiedis, Flea, Smith, Klinghoffer, Frusciante, Slovak (represented by his brother James), Irons, and Martinez. Frusciante was invited, but did not attend. Navarro and Sherman were not inducted; Sherman said that he felt "dishonored". The band performed "By the Way", "Give It Away" and "Higher Ground", which included Irons and Martinez on drums. It was the first time Kiedis and Flea had performed with Irons in more than 20 years.

In 2003, Rolling Stone released their first list of the "500 Greatest Albums of All Time", with Blood Sugar Sex Magik at No. 310 and Californication at No. 399. In 2012, a revised list was released, with Californication at No. 401. In 2020, Rolling Stone released another version of the list, with Blood Sugar Sex Magik at No. 186 and Californication at No. 286. The band received a star on the Hollywood Walk of Fame on March 31, 2022. George Clinton, Woody Harrelson, and Bob Forrest unveiled the star at the ceremony. On August 28, 2022, the band received the Global Icon Award at the 2022 MTV Video Music Awards. The award was presented to them by Cheech & Chong.

== Public profile ==
=== Activism ===
In 1990, the Chili Peppers appeared in PSA ads for Rock the Vote, a non-profit organization in the United States geared toward increasing voter turnout in the United States Presidential Election among voters ages 18 to 24. The band was invited by the Beastie Boys and the Milarepa Fund to perform at the Tibetan Freedom Concert in June 1996 in San Francisco. They also performed at the June 1998 Washington, D.C. concert. The concerts, which were broadcast worldwide, were to support the cause of Tibetan independence.

In September 2005, the band performed "Under the Bridge" at the ReAct Now: Music & Relief benefit which was held to raise money for the victims of Hurricane Katrina. The live event raised about $30 million. In July 2007, the band performed on behalf of former U.S. Vice President Al Gore who invited the band to perform at the London version of his Live Earth concerts which were held to raise awareness towards global warming and solving the most critical environmental issues of our time. The band performed a free concert in downtown Cleveland, Ohio in April 2012 in support of President Obama's re-election campaign. The requirement for getting into the concert was agreeing to volunteer for the Obama 2012 phone bank. The event quickly met its capacity limit after being announced.

In May 2013, the band performed a concert in Portland, Oregon for the Dalai Lama as part of the Dalai Lama Environmental Summit. In January 2015, they performed their first show of the new year for the Sean Penn & Friends Help Haiti Home fundraiser in support of the J/P Haitian Relief Organization. In September 2015, the band joined more than 120 other entertainers and celebrities to formally endorse Bernie Sanders for president during the Democratic primary ahead of the 2016 presidential election. The band performed at a fundraiser event at the Belly Up Tavern in Solana Beach, California in the same month and the money was donated to A Reason To Survive (ARTS), Heartbeat Music Academy, San Diego Young Artists Music Academy, and the Silverlake Conservatory of Music. In October, Kiedis and Flea hosted the annual benefit for the Silverlake Conservatory of Music. The band performed a special rare acoustic set.

In February 2016, the band headlined a fundraiser concert in support of Sanders. In April, they performed at a private function on behalf of Facebook and Napster founder Sean Parker for his launch of The Parker Institute for Cancer Immunotherapy. Smith and Will Ferrell hosted the Red Hot Benefit Comedy + Music Show & Quinceanera in the same month. The benefit featured a performance by the Chili Peppers along with comedy acts selected by Ferrell and Funny or Die. A portion of the proceeds went to Ferrell's Cancer for College and Smith's Silverlake Conservatory of Music southwest of Glendale. In February 2018, Smith again joined Ferrell at his One Classy Night benefit at the Moore Theatre in Seattle to help raise money for Cancer for College. The event raised $300,000 in college scholarship money for students who have survived cancer.

Both Flea and Chad Smith have started their own music schools and foundations. Flea opened/founded the "Silverlake Conservatory of Music" in 2001 and Smith started the "Chad Smith Foundation" in August 2025 that provides music equipment, education and scholarships to children.

=== Conviction and sexual harassment ===
On April 21, 1989, Kiedis was convicted of sexual battery and indecent exposure after a concert at George Mason University in Fairfax, Virginia. He exposed himself and pressed his penis to a woman's face against her wishes. He was fined $1,000 on each charge. In 1990, Kiedis said the incident was "blown way out of proportion by both the media and the prosecution", and was merely "a playful thing that happened backstage" with no intent of harm.

In 1990, Flea and Smith were arrested on charges of battery in Daytona Beach, Florida, at a spring break performance for MTV. Flea was also charged with disorderly conduct and solicitation to commit an unnatural and lascivious act. Flea picked up a 20-year-old woman and threw her into the sand, while Smith forcibly removed her bathing suit and slapped her buttocks. Flea allegedly demanded that she perform oral sex on him before both he and Smith were removed by security. After the arrest, the State University of New York at New Paltz canceled a Chili Peppers concert. Flea and Smith pled guilty to all charges. They were each sentenced to pay a $1,000 fine, plus $300 to the State Attorney's Office for prosecution costs and $5,000 to the Volusia County Rape Crisis Center, and ordered to write letters of apology to the woman. In a 1992 Rolling Stone interview, Flea said: "I wish I'd never done it, and it was a really stupid thing to do. I was out of control. But I did not assault anybody, and it was not sexual. It had nothing to do with sex."

In 2016, Julie Farman, a former music executive, alleged that two members of the Red Hot Chili Peppers pressed themselves against her and "told me about all of the ways we could make a super sexy sandwich" after a meeting with them at Epic Records in 1990.

== Members ==
Current

- Flea (Michael Balzary) – bass, backing vocals (1982–present), trumpet (1988–present), piano (1991, 2011–present)
- Anthony Kiedis – lead vocals (1982–1986, 1986–present) (Note: Kiedis was absent from the band for a brief unspecified time in 1986, but rejoined soon thereafter.)
- Chad Smith – drums, percussion (1988–present)
- John Frusciante – guitars, backing vocals (1988–1992, 1998–2009, 2019–present), keyboards (2001–2009, 2019–present)

== Discography ==
- The Red Hot Chili Peppers (1984)
- Freaky Styley (1985)
- The Uplift Mofo Party Plan (1987)
- Mother's Milk (1989)
- Blood Sugar Sex Magik (1991)
- One Hot Minute (1995)
- Californication (1999)
- By the Way (2002)
- Stadium Arcadium (2006)
- I'm with You (2011)
- The Getaway (2016)
- Unlimited Love (2022)
- Return of the Dream Canteen (2022)

== Tours ==
- Red Hot Chili Peppers 1982–1983 Tour (1982–1983)
- Red Hot Chili Peppers 1984 Tour (1984)
- Freaky Styley Tour (1985–1986)
- The Uplift Mofo Party Tour (1987–1988)
- Turd Town Tour (1988)
- Mother's Milk Tour (1989–1990)
- Blood Sugar Sex Magik Tour (1991–1993)
- Tour de La Sensitive (1994)
- One Hot Minute Tour (1995–1997)
- Californication Tour (1999–2000)
- Red Hot Chili Peppers 2001 Tour (2001)
- By the Way World Tour (2002–2003)
- Roll on the Red Tour (2004)
- Stadium Arcadium World Tour (2006–2007)
- I'm with You World Tour (2011–2013)
- Red Hot Chili Peppers 2013–2014 Tour
- The Getaway World Tour (2016–2017)
- Unlimited Love Tour (2022–2024)

== See also ==
- List of artists who reached number one on the U.S. alternative rock chart
- List of artists who reached number one on the U.S. Mainstream Rock chart
- List of best-selling music artists
- List of funk metal and funk rock bands
