= Ryan Hewitt (music producer) =

- Born: Ryan Hewitt
- Genres: Rock; country; pop; alternative rock
- Occupations: Record producer; engineer; mixer
- Website: www.ryanhewitt.com

Ryan Hewitt is an American music producer, engineer and mixer known for his work with the Lumineers, Red Hot Chili Peppers, the Avett Brothers, the Chicks, Third Eye Blind, Jamie Cullum, John Frusciante and the Turnpike Troubadours. Hewitt is a Grammy Award winner having received the accolade for mixing and engineering Red Hot Chili Peppers' ninth studio album Stadium Arcadium. The album received seven Grammy nominations and won in the categories of Best Rock Album and Best Boxed or Special Limited Edition Package. He is currently based in Nashville, Tennessee.

== Education and career ==
Hewitt grew up working with his father David Hewitt, a recording engineer. He went on to study at Tufts University in Boston, MA where he earned a Bachelor of Science in Electrical Engineering. After establishing a rapport with Red Hot Chili Peppers guitarist John Frusciante, he went on to mix and engineer eight solo albums for Frusciante.

Hewitt moved from Los Angeles to Nashville in 2015 where he currently resides. Hewitt is based at the House of Blues Studios in Berry Hill, where he mixed the Lumineers' album Cleopatra as well as A Long Way from Your Heart by the Turnpike Troubadors.

== Selected discography ==
Artist	Year	Album	Producer	Engineer	Mixer					
Vianney	2026	D'Or et D'Étain			|-	Red Hot Chili Peppers	2022	Return of the Dream Canteen	check	check
Unlimited Love		check	check			Red Hot Chili Peppers	2022			
Brett Eldredge	2020	Sunday Drive			check					
Molly Tuttle	2019	When You're Ready	check							
American Aquarium	2018	Things Change			check					
Bronze Radio Return	2018	Forthcoming Album			check					
Vance Joy	2018	"I'm with You"			check					
Turnpike Troubadours	2017	A Long Way from Your Heart	check	check	check					
PEACE	2017	Kindness is the New Rock and Roll	check	check	check					
The Chicks	2017	MMXVI in Concert			check					
Christian Lopez	2017	Red Arrow		check	check					
Bat for Lashes	2016	The Bride		check						
Cody Jinks	2016	I'm Not the Devil		check	check					
The Lumineers	2016	Cleopatra		check	check					
Dan Mangan	2016	Forthcoming Album		check	check					
The Railers	2016	"11:59 (Central Standard Time)"		check	check					
Anti-Flag	2015	American Spring		check						
The Avett Brothers	2015	Live Volume 4			check					
The Black Lillies	2015	Hard to Please	check	check	check					
Third Eye Blind	2015	Dopamine			check					
Whitey Morgan	2014	Sonic Ranch	check	check	check					
needtobreathe	2014	Rivers in the Wasteland			check					
Angus & Julia Stone	2014	Angus & Julia Stone		check	check					
Dan Wilson	2014	Love Without Fear			check					
The Avett Brothers	2013	Magpie and the Dandelion		check	check					
Harry Connick Jr.	2013	Every Man Should Know			check					
Matchbox Twenty	2012	North		check						
Johnny Cash & Bob Dylan	2011	One Too Many Mornings		check	check					
Tom Morello & the Nightwatchman	2011	World Wide Rebel Songs			check					
Sum 41	2011	Screaming Bloody Murder		check						
Tom Morello & the Nightwatchman	2011	Union Town		check						
Flogging Molly	2011	Speed of Darkness	check	check	check					
Johnny Cash	2010	American VI: Ain't No Grave			check					
Flogging Molly	2010	Live at the Greek Theatre			check					
The Avett Brothers	2010	Live Volume 3			check					
Jamie Cullum	2009	The Pursuit		check	check					
Brandi Carlile	2009	Give Up the Ghost			check					
Red Hot Chili Peppers	2006	Stadium Arcadium		check	check					
