= Red Hot Chili Peppers videography =

Band videography

== Videography ==
- 1988: Red Hot Skate Rock - live
- 1989: Hard 'n Heavy Vol. 2 - "Good Time Boys" music video and interviews
- 1990: Psychedelic Sexfunk Live from Heaven - live
- 1991: Positive Mental Octopus - music videos
- 1991: Best Of The Cutting Edge Volume II - music videos
- 1992: Funky Monks - making of Blood Sugar Sex Magik album
- 1992: What Hits!? - music videos
- 1994: Live On Air
- 2001: Off the Map - live
- 2001: Rock Your Socks Off (Unauthorized) - documentary
- 2002: Rockthology 1: Hard N Heavy - music videos/interviews
- 2003: Greatest Hits and Videos - music videos/behind the scenes
- 2003: Live at Slane Castle - live
- 2004: Rock Odyssey 2004 - live
- 2004: The Last Gang In Town - documentary
- 2006: The Red Hot Chili Peppers Phenomenon - documentary
- 2006: iTunes Originals - Red Hot Chili Peppers - Combination of live performances, interviews and music videos available exclusively on iTunes
- 2007: Red Hot Chili Peppers In Performance - Live/Documentary

== Music videos ==
Year	Title	Director	Album
1984	"True Men Don't Kill Coyotes"	Graeme Whifler	The Red Hot Chili Peppers
1986	"Jungle Man"	Lindy Goetz	Freaky Styley
1986	"Catholic School Girls Rule"	Dick Rude	Freaky Styley
1987	"Fight Like a Brave"	Dick Rude	The Uplift Mofo Party Plan
1988	"Fire"	Live performance	Mother's Milk
1989	"Good Time Boys"	Drew Carolan	Mother's Milk
1989	"Higher Ground"	Bill Stobaugh and Drew Carolan	Mother's Milk
1989	"Knock Me Down"	Drew Carolan	Mother's Milk
1990	"Taste the Pain"	Tom Stern and Alex Winter	Mother's Milk
1990	"Show Me Your Soul"	Bill Stobaugh	Pretty Woman soundtrack
1991	"Give It Away"	Stéphane Sednaoui	Blood Sugar Sex Magik
1992	"Under the Bridge"	Gus Van Sant	Blood Sugar Sex Magik
1992	"Under the Bridge" (Version 2)	Gus Van Sant	Blood Sugar Sex Magik
1992	"Under the Bridge" (Version 3)	Gus Van Sant	Blood Sugar Sex Magik
1992	"Suck My Kiss"	Gavin Bowden	Blood Sugar Sex Magik
1992	"Breaking the Girl"	Stéphane Sednaoui	Blood Sugar Sex Magik
1992	"Behind the Sun"	Charlie Paul	The Uplift Mofo Party Plan
1993	"If You Have to Ask"	Compilation footage	Blood Sugar Sex Magik
1993	"Soul to Squeeze"	Kevin Kerslake	Coneheads: Music from the Motion Picture Soundtrack
1995	"Warped"	Gavin Bowden	One Hot Minute
1995	"My Friends"	Anton Corbijn	One Hot Minute
1995	"My Friends" (Version 2)	Gavin Bowden	One Hot Minute
1996	"Aeroplane"	Gavin Bowden	One Hot Minute
1996	"Coffee Shop"	Gavin Bowden	One Hot Minute
1996	"Love Rollercoaster"	Kevin Lofton	Beavis and Butthead Do America Soundtrack
1999	"Scar Tissue"	Stéphane Sednaoui	Californication
1999	"Around the World"	Stéphane Sednaoui	Californication
1999	"Otherside"	Jonathan Dayton and Valerie Faris	Californication
2000	"Californication"	Jonathan Dayton and Valerie Faris	Californication
2000	"Road Trippin'"	Jonathan Dayton and Valerie Faris	Californication
2002	"By the Way"	Jonathan Dayton and Valerie Faris	By the Way
2002	"By the Way" (Version 2)	Jonathan Dayton and Valerie Faris	By the Way
2002	"The Zephyr Song"	Jonathan Dayton and Valerie Faris	By the Way
2003	"Can't Stop"	Mark Romanek	By the Way
2003	"Universally Speaking"	Dick Rude	By the Way
2003	"Fortune Faded"	Laurent Briet	Greatest Hits
2006	"Dani California"	Tony Kaye	Stadium Arcadium
2006	"Tell Me Baby"	Jonathan Dayton and Valerie Faris	Stadium Arcadium
2006	"Snow ((Hey Oh))"	Nick Wickham	Stadium Arcadium
2007	"Charlie"	Omri Cohen	Stadium Arcadium
2007	"Desecration Smile"	Gus Van Sant	Stadium Arcadium
2007	"Desecration Smile" (Version 2)	Gus Van Sant	Stadium Arcadium
2007	"Hump de Bump"	Chris Rock	Stadium Arcadium
2011	"The Adventures of Rain Dance Maggie"	Marc Klasfeld	I'm with You
2011	"The Adventures of Rain Dance Maggie" (Version 2 - unreleased)	Kreayshawn	I'm with You
2011	"Monarchy of Roses"	Marc Klasfeld	I'm with You
2012	"Look Around"	Robert Hales	I'm with You
2012	"Brendan's Death Song" (radio edit version)	Marc Klasfeld	I'm with You
2012	"Brendan's Death Song" (album version)	Marc Klasfeld	I'm with You
2016	"Dark Necessities"	Olivia Wilde	The Getaway
2016	"Go Robot"	Thoranna Sigurdardottir aka Tota Lee	The Getaway
2016	"Sick Love"	Beth Jeans Houghton	The Getaway
2017	"Goodbye Angels"	Thoranna Sigurdardottir aka TOTA	The Getaway
2022	"Black Summer"	Deborah Chow	Unlimited Love
2022	"Poster Child"	Julien & Thami	Unlimited Love
2022	"These Are the Ways"	Malia James	Unlimited Love
2022	"Tippa My Tongue"	Malia James	Return of the Dream Canteen
2022	"The Drummer"	Phillip R Lopez	Return of the Dream Canteen

=== Notes ===
- The video for "Catholic School Girls Rule" was aired only once in the U.S., on the Playboy Channel, because of a nude scene.
- A video for the song "Good Time Boys", which featured cut away interview footage, was made as promotional video for Mother's Milk, but the song was never released as a single.
- Two versions of "Under the Bridge" were filmed. The second, and rarely seen version featured less footage of Anthony walking down the street.
- The video for "If You Have to Ask" has rarely been seen and was never aired in the United States and has been taken off the internet by the RIAA.
- A second version of "My Friends" was filmed. To this date, Anthony, Flea and Chad all agree that they prefer the second version, which shows the band recording the song in the studio over the much more known version of them wearing dresses and in a boat. The band even included the second version and not the original on their Greatest Hits DVD.
- The videos for "Road Trippin'" and "Universally Speaking" were not released in the United States until the 2003 Greatest Hits DVD. "Desecration Smile" is also a non-U.S. release.
- On March 6, 2007 the Chili Peppers announced a contest for someone to direct a video for the song "Charlie" through their YouTube channel. The video winner has been chosen, however, the song being released as a single is still unknown.
- On August 17, 2011, the band released the music video for The Adventures of Rain Dance Maggie. The video was originally directed by Kreayshawn however the band decided to shoot a second version with director, Marc Klasfeld and released his version. It is unknown why they decided not to go with Kreayshawn's video or if her video will ever be released.
- Two versions of the "Brendan's Death Song" video were released. Originally the shorter radio edit version of the video was released however the band wanted the longer version released as well.
