= Red Hot Chili Peppers discography =

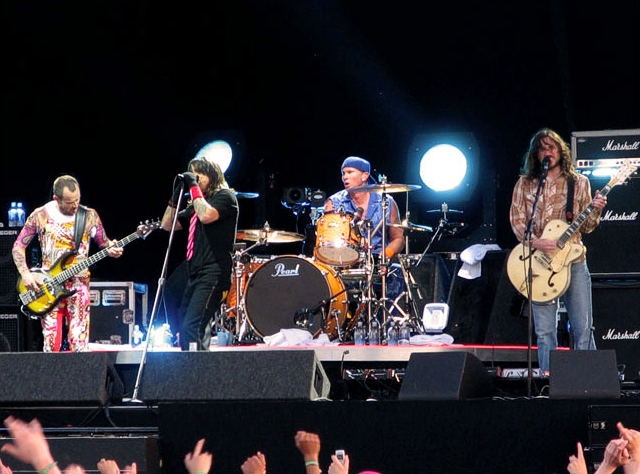
- Red Hot Chili Peppers live at Pinkpop Festival, 2006
- Studio albums: 13
- Extended plays: 5
- Live albums: 2
- Compilation albums: 12
- Singles: 66
- Video albums: 12
- Music videos: 53
- Other singles: 5

Since 1982, the American funk rock band Red Hot Chili Peppers has released 13 studio albums, two live albums, 12 compilation albums, 11 video albums (including promotional releases), five extended plays, 66 singles (including promotional releases), and 53 music videos. They have sold over 120 million records worldwide. According to the Recording Industry Association of America (RIAA), the band has six multi-Platinum, two Platinum and three Gold albums in the United States, totalling 27.5 million units. They also have nine multi-Platinum, three Platinum and four Gold singles, totalling 40 million. They have been nominated for 19 Grammy Awards, winning six. They hold the records for most number-one singles (15), most cumulative weeks at number one (91), and most top 10 songs (28) on the Billboard Alternative Songs chart.

The band’s first three studio albums—The Red Hot Chili Peppers (1984), Freaky Styley (1985), and The Uplift Mofo Party Plan (1987)—achieved little commercial success. Their fourth album, Mother's Milk (1989), reached number 52 on the Billboard 200 and marked their breakthrough. With Blood Sugar Sex Magik (1991), the band entered mainstream success. Its single "Under the Bridge" peaked at number two on the US Billboard Hot 100, and the album sold over seven million copies in the United States and 13 million worldwide. Guitarist John Frusciante left in 1992, leading to several replacements before Dave Navarro joined in 1993. Their sixth album, One Hot Minute (1995), peaked at number four on the Billboard 200 but did not match the success of Blood Sugar Sex Magik.

Frusciante rejoined in 1998, and the band released Californication (1999), which peaked at number three on the Billboard 200 and was certified six times Platinum by the RIAA. The album produced six singles, including the Hot 100 top-ten hit "Scar Tissue". Their eighth album, By the Way (2002), reached number two on the Billboard 200 and included successful singles such as "By the Way" and "Can't Stop". Stadium Arcadium (2006), their ninth studio album, became their first to top the Billboard 200. It produced three consecutive number-one hits on the Alternative Songs chart, with "Dani California" spending 14 weeks at number one and reaching number six on the Hot 100.

Frusciante left again in 2009, and in 2010 the band began recording their tenth studio album with guitarist Josh Klinghoffer. Released in August 2011, I'm with You peaked at number two on the Billboard 200. Its lead single, "The Adventures of Rain Dance Maggie", reached number 38 on the Hot 100 and became their 12th number-one on the Alternative Songs chart. The band released their 11th studio album, The Getaway, in June 2016. Produced by Danger Mouse, it was their first album without Rick Rubin since 1989 and their last with Klinghoffer. The lead single "Dark Necessities" became their 13th number-one on the Alternative Songs chart and their 25th top-ten entry, extending their record over U2. It also became only the fourth song to top the Mainstream Rock, Alternative Songs, and Adult Alternative charts simultaneously. The Getaway debuted at number two on the Billboard 200, becoming their seventh consecutive album to chart within the top four since Blood Sugar Sex Magik (1991).

In December 2019, the band announced that Klinghoffer had departed and John Frusciante had rejoined. Their 12th studio album, Unlimited Love, was released on April 1, 2022. It debuted at number one in 10 countries, including the United States, their first U.S. number-one since Stadium Arcadium (2006). The lead single "Black Summer" debuted at number three, later becoming their 14th number-one and 26th top-ten on the Alternative Songs chart, giving them number-one singles in four different decades, tied with Green Day. The band’s 13th studio album, Return of the Dream Canteen, was released on October 14, 2022. Its lead single "Tippa My Tongue" became their fourth number-one on the Rock & Alternative Airplay chart and their 15th number-one on the Alternative Airplay chart. The second single, "The Drummer," reached number 10, becoming their 28th top-ten entry on the Alternative Airplay chart, a record they share with the Foo Fighters.

== Albums ==
=== Studio albums ===
List of studio albums, with selected chart positions, sales figures and certifications
Title	Album details	Peak chart positions										Certifications
Title	Album details	US	AUS	AUT	CAN	FRA	GER	NLD	NZ	SWI	UK	Certifications
The Red Hot Chili Peppers	Released: August 10, 1984 (US); Label: EMI, Capitol; Formats: CD, CS, LP	— (Note: Red Hot Chili Peppers did not enter the Billboard 200, but peaked at number one on Bubbling Under the Top 200 Albums, which acted as a 10-extension of the Billboard 200.)	—	—	—	—	—	—	—	—	—	
Freaky Styley	Released: August 16, 1985 (US); Label: EMI; Formats: CD, CS, LP	—	—	—	—	—	—	—	—	—	—	BPI: Silver
The Uplift Mofo Party Plan	Released: September 29, 1987 (US); Label: EMI; Formats: CD, CS, LP	148	—	—	—	—	—	—	—	—	—	RIAA: Gold; BPI: Silver
Mother's Milk	Released: August 16, 1989 (US); Label: EMI; Formats: CD, CS, LP	52	33	—	—	—	—	69	47	—	—	RIAA: Platinum; BPI: Silver; MC: Gold
Blood Sugar Sex Magik	Released: September 24, 1991 (US); Label: Warner Bros.; Formats: CD, CS, LP	3	1	17	1	33	12	2	1	10	25	RIAA: 7× Platinum; ARIA: 6× Platinum; BPI: 3× Platinum; BVMI: Platinum; IFPI AUT: Gold; MC: 4× Platinum; NVPI: Platinum; RMNZ: 3× Platinum; SNEP: Platinum
One Hot Minute	Released: September 12, 1995 (US); Label: Warner Bros.; Formats: CD, CS, LP	4	1	4	6	3	3	5	1	2	2	RIAA: 2× Platinum; ARIA: 3× Platinum; BPI: Gold; IFPI AUT: Gold; IFPI SWI: Gold; MC: Platinum; NVPI: Gold; RMNZ: Platinum; SNEP: Platinum
Californication	Released: June 8, 1999 (US); Label: Warner Bros.; Formats: CD, CS, LP	3	1	2	2	2	2	2	1	3	5	RIAA: 8× Platinum; ARIA: 8× Platinum; BPI: 5× Platinum; BVMI: 3× Gold; IFPI AUT: 2× Platinum; IFPI SWI: 2× Platinum; MC: 6× Platinum; NVPI: 2× Platinum; RMNZ: 8× Platinum; SNEP: 2× Gold
By the Way	Released: July 9, 2002 (US); Label: Warner Bros.; Formats: CD, CS, LP	2	1	1	1	2	1	1	1	1	1	RIAA: 2× Platinum; ARIA: 5× Platinum; BPI: 7× Platinum; BVMI: 5× Gold; IFPI AUT: Platinum; IFPI SWI: 2× Platinum; MC: 2× Platinum; NVPI: Platinum; RMNZ: 2× Platinum; SNEP: Platinum
Stadium Arcadium	Released: May 9, 2006 (US); Label: Warner Bros.; Formats: CD, LP, DL	1	1	1	1	1	1	1	1	1	1	RIAA: 4× Platinum; ARIA: 3× Platinum; BPI: 3× Platinum; BVMI: 3× Platinum; IFPI AUT: Platinum; IFPI SWI: 2× Platinum; MC: 4× Platinum; NVPI: Platinum; RMNZ: 6× Platinum; SNEP: Platinum
I'm with You	Released: August 29, 2011 (US); Label: Warner Bros.; Formats: CD, LP, DL	2	2	2	2	2	1	1	1	1	1	RIAA: Gold; ARIA: Platinum; BPI: Gold; BVMI: Platinum; IFPI AUT: Gold; IFPI SWI: Platinum; MC: Platinum; NVPI: Gold; RMNZ: Platinum; SNEP: Platinum
The Getaway	Released: June 17, 2016; Label: Warner Bros.; Formats: CD, LP, DL	2	1	1	2	3	2	1	1	1	2	RIAA: Gold; BPI: Gold; BVMI: Gold; IFPI AUT: Gold; IFPI SWI: Gold; MC: Gold; NVPI: Gold; RMNZ: Platinum; SNEP: Platinum
Unlimited Love	Released: April 1, 2022; Label: Warner; Formats: CD, CS, LP, DL	1	1	1	1	1	1	1	1	1	1	BPI: Silver; SNEP: Gold
Return of the Dream Canteen	Released: October 14, 2022; Label: Warner; Formats: CD, CS, LP, DL	3	2	1	3	1	1	1	1	1	2	
"—" denotes a recording that did not chart or was not released in that territory.

=== Live albums ===
List of live albums, with selected chart positions and certifications
Title	Album details	Peak chart positions								Certifications
Title	Album details	AUS	AUT	FRA	GER	NLD	NZ	SWI	UK	Certifications
Red Hot Chili Peppers Live in Hyde Park	Released: August 3, 2004; Label: Warner Bros.; Formats: CD, LP, DL	5	1	5	8	4	13	1	1	ARIA: Platinum; BPI: Gold; IFPI AUT: Gold; IFPI SWI: Gold
Cardiff, Wales: 6/23/04	Released: March 17, 2015; Label: Formats: Free MP3 download	—	—	—	—	—	—	—	—	

=== Compilation albums ===
List of compilation albums, with selected chart positions, sales figures and certifications
Title	Album details	Peak chart positions										Sales	Certifications
Title	Album details	US	AUS	AUT	CAN	FRA	GER	NLD	NZ	SWI	UK	Sales	Certifications
Sock-Cess	Released: 1989 (UK); Label: EMI; Formats: CD	—	—	—	—	—	—	—	—	—	—		
What Hits!?	Released: September 29, 1992 (US); Label: EMI, Capitol; Formats: CD, CS, LP	22	9	—	18	—	—	80	5	34	23	US: 1,500,000	RIAA: Platinum; ARIA: Platinum; BPI: Platinum; MC: Platinum
Live Rare Remix Box	Released: 1994 (US); Label: Warner Bros.; Formats: CD	—	—	—	—	—	—	—	—	—	—		
The Plasma Shaft	Released: October 13, 1994 (AUS); Label: Warner Bros.; Formats: CD	—	6	—	—	—	—	—	15	—	—		ARIA: Gold
Out in L.A.	Released: November 1, 1994 (US); Label: EMI, Capitol; Formats: CD, CS, LP	82	—	—	47	37	—	94	—	37	61	US: 126,000	
The Best of the Red Hot Chili Peppers	Released: 1994 (US); Label: Capitol; Formats: CD	—	—	—	—	—	—	—	—	—	—		
Under the Covers: Essential Red Hot Chili Peppers	Released: March 31, 1998 (US); Label: EMI, Capitol; Formats: CD	—	—	—	—	—	—	—	—	—	—		
Greatest Hits	Released: November 18, 2003 (US); Label: Warner Bros.; Formats: CD, LP, DL	18	2	2	20	39	4	4	2	2	4		RIAA: 2× Platinum; ARIA: 6× Platinum; BVMI: 5× Gold; BPI: 8× Platinum; IFPI AUT: Gold; IFPI SWI: 2× Platinum; NVPI: Gold; RMNZ: 3× Platinum; SNEP: Gold
10 Great Songs	Released: 2009; Label: Capitol; Formats: CD	—	—	—	—	—	—	—	—	—	—		
Road Trippin' Through Time	Released: 2011 (US); Label: Warner Bros.; Formats: CD	—	—	—	—	—	—	—	—	—	—		
I'm Beside You	Released: November 29, 2013 (US); Label: Warner Bros.; Formats: LP (Record Store Day limited edition)	—	—	—	—	—	—	—	—	—	—		
"—" denotes a recording that did not chart or was not released in that territory.

== Extended plays ==
List of extended plays, with selected chart positions
Title	EP details	Peak chart positions
Title	EP details	US
The Abbey Road E.P.	Released: 1988 (US); Label: EMI; Formats: CD	—
2011 Live EP	Released: March 29, 2012 (US); Label: Warner Bros.; Formats: DL	—
Rock & Roll Hall of Fame Covers EP	Released: May 1, 2012 (US); Label: Warner Bros.; Formats: DL	91
2012-13 Live EP	Released: July 1, 2014; Label: Warner Bros.; Formats: DL	—
Live in Paris	Released: July 1, 2016; Label: Deezer; Formats: music streaming	—
"—" denotes a recording that did not chart or was not released in that territory.

== Singles ==
=== 1980s and 1990s ===
List of singles released in the 1980s and 1990s, with selected chart positions and certifications, showing year released and album name
Title	Year	Peak chart positions										Certifications	Album
Title	Year	US	US Alt.	AUS	CAN	FRA	GER	IRL	NLD	NZ	UK	Certifications	Album
"True Men Don't Kill Coyotes"	1984	—	—	—	—	—	—	—	—	—	—		The Red Hot Chili Peppers
"Catholic School Girls Rule"	1986	—	—	—	—	—	—	—	—	—	—		Freaky Styley
"Fight Like a Brave"	1987	—	—	—	—	—	—	—	—	—	—		The Uplift Mofo Party Plan
"Higher Ground"	1989	—	11	45	—	—	—	—	38	15	54	BPI: Gold; RMNZ: Gold	Mother's Milk
"Knock Me Down"	1989	—	6	—	—	—	—	—	—	—	—		Mother's Milk
"Taste the Pain"	1989	—	—	—	—	—	—	—	—	—	29		Mother's Milk
"Show Me Your Soul"	1990	—	10	—	—	—	—	—	—	—	—		Pretty Woman: Original Motion Picture Soundtrack
"Give It Away"	1991	73	1	41	—	49	—	19	42	22	9	RIAA: 2× Platinum; BPI: Platinum; RMNZ: 2× Platinum	Blood Sugar Sex Magik
"Under the Bridge"	1991	2	6	1	3	136	11	20	1	2	13	RIAA: 6× Platinum; ARIA: Platinum; BPI: 3× Platinum; BVMI: Platinum; NVPI: Gold; RMNZ: 9× Platinum	Blood Sugar Sex Magik
"Suck My Kiss"	1992	—	15	8	—	—	—	—	—	3	—	RIAA: Gold; RMNZ: Gold	Blood Sugar Sex Magik
"Breaking the Girl"	1992	—	19	30	45	—	—	19	48	12	41	RIAA: Gold; RMNZ: Gold	Blood Sugar Sex Magik
"Behind the Sun"	1992	— (Note: "Behind the Sun" did not enter the Billboard Hot 100, but peaked at number 24 on the Bubbling Under Hot 100 Singles chart, which acts as a 25-song extension to the Hot 100.)	7	37	73	—	—	—	—	7	—		The Uplift Mofo Party Plan (Note: "Behind the Sun" was not released as a single until 1992 when it was used to promote the What Hits!? compilation album.)
"If You Have to Ask"	1993	—	—	106	—	—	—	—	—	—	—		Blood Sugar Sex Magik
"Soul to Squeeze"	1993	22	1	9	8	—	—	—	—	6	—	ARIA: Gold; RMNZ: Platinum	Coneheads: Music from the Motion Picture Soundtrack
"Warped"	1995	— (Note: "Warped" did not enter the Billboard Hot 100, but peaked at number 41 on the Hot 100 Airplay chart.)	7	12	—	—	47	—	—	4	31		One Hot Minute
"My Friends"	1995	— (Note: "My Friends" did not enter the Billboard Hot 100, but peaked at number 27 on the Hot 100 Airplay chart.)	1	15	11	40	81	—	—	20	29	RMNZ: Gold	One Hot Minute
"Aeroplane"	1996	— (Note: "Aeroplane" did not enter the Billboard Hot 100, but peaked at number 49 on the Hot 100 Airplay chart.)	8	35	48	—	—	—	—	26	11	RMNZ: Gold	One Hot Minute
"Shallow Be Thy Game"	1996	—	—	88	—	—	—	—	—	—	—		One Hot Minute
"Coffee Shop"	1996	—	—	—	—	—	—	—	—	—	—		One Hot Minute
"Love Rollercoaster"	1996	— (Note: "Love Rollercoaster" did not enter the Billboard Hot 100, but peaked at number 40 on the Hot 100 Airplay chart.)	14	19	49	—	—	24	—	35	7		Beavis and Butt-head Do America: Original Motion Picture Soundtrack
"Scar Tissue"	1999	9	1	15	4	66	75	16	38	3	15	RIAA: 6× Platinum; ARIA: Gold; BPI: 2× Platinum; BVMI: Gold; RMNZ: 7× Platinum	Californication
"Around the World"	1999	— (Note: "Around the World" did not enter the Billboard Hot 100, but peaked at number eight on the Bubbling Under Hot 100 Singles chart, which acts as a 25-song extension to the Hot 100.)	7	49	—	—	—	—	69	35	35	RIAA: Gold; BPI: Silver; RMNZ: Platinum	Californication
"—" denotes a recording that did not chart or was not released in that territory.

=== 2000s ===
List of singles released in the 2000s, with selected chart positions and certifications, showing year released and album name
Title	Year	Peak chart positions										Certifications	Album
Title	Year	US	US Alt.	AUS	CAN	GER	IRL	NLD	NZ	SWI	UK	Certifications	Album
"Otherside"	2000	14	1	31	32	44	41	24	5	65	33	RIAA: 5× Platinum; BPI: 2× Platinum; RMNZ: 5× Platinum	Californication
"Californication"	2000	69	1	44	59	63	24	41	8	—	16	RIAA: 6× Platinum; BPI: 3× Platinum; RMNZ: 7× Platinum	Californication
"Road Trippin'"	2000	—	—	56	—	89	27	80	44	91	30	RIAA: Gold; BPI: Silver; RMNZ: Gold	Californication
"By the Way"	2002	34	1	6	2	22	7	12	13	8	2	RIAA: 2× Platinum; ARIA: Gold; BPI: 2× Platinum; RMNZ: 2× Platinum	By the Way
"The Zephyr Song"	2002	49	6	21	11	65	22	72	9	100	11	RIAA: Gold; BPI: Platinum; RMNZ: 2× Platinum	By the Way
"Can't Stop"	2003	57	1	38	—	48	30	65	40	39	22	RIAA: 4× Platinum; BPI: 4× Platinum; BVMI: Platinum; RMNZ: 6× Platinum	By the Way
"Dosed"	2003	—	13	—	—	—	—	—	—	—	—		By the Way
"Universally Speaking"	2003	—	—	80	—	—	42	—	—	—	27	BPI: Silver	By the Way
"Fortune Faded"	2003	— (Note: "Fortune Faded" did not enter the Billboard Hot 100, but peaked at number 12 on the Bubbling Under Hot 100 Singles chart, which acts as a 25-song extension to the Hot 100.)	8	16	—	46	20	61	37	59	11		Greatest Hits
"Dani California"	2006	6	1	8	1	12	7	7	7	4	2	RIAA: 5× Platinum; ARIA: Gold; BPI: 2× Platinum; RMNZ: 4× Platinum	Stadium Arcadium
"Tell Me Baby"	2006	50	1	20	17	37	12	27	16	43	16	RIAA: Platinum; BPI: Silver; RMNZ: Gold	Stadium Arcadium
"Snow (Hey Oh)"	2006	22	1	35	35	5	13	5	10	9	16	RIAA: 4× Platinum; BPI: 2× Platinum; BVMI: Gold; RMNZ: 6× Platinum	Stadium Arcadium
"Desecration Smile"	2007	—	—	—	—	67	—	24	33	—	27		Stadium Arcadium
"Hump de Bump"	2007	—	8	17	63	83	—	43	—	43	41		Stadium Arcadium
"—" denotes a recording that did not chart or was not released in that territory.

=== 2010s ===
List of singles released in the 2010s, with selected chart positions and certifications, showing year released and album name
Title	Year	Peak chart positions										Certifications	Album
Title	Year	US	US Rock	AUS	CAN	FRA	GER	JPN	NLD	SWI	UK	Certifications	Album
"The Adventures of Rain Dance Maggie"	2011	38	1	41	16	38	20	6	28	26	44	RIAA: Platinum; RMNZ: Gold	I'm with You
"Monarchy of Roses"	2011	—	7	—	— (Note: "Monarchy of Roses" did not enter the Billboard Canadian Hot 100, but peaked at number 46 on the Canadian All-format Airplay chart.)	—	—	31	— (Note: "Monarchy of Roses" did not enter the Netherlands Single Top 100 but peaked on the Dutch Tipparade Chart at number three.)	— (Note: "Monarchy of Roses" did not enter the Swiss Singles chart, but charted at number 98 on the Swiss Airplay chart.)	—		I'm with You
"Look Around"	2012	—	11	—	85	—	—	72	—	— (Note: "Look Around" did not enter the Swiss Singles chart, but charted at number 66 on the Swiss Airplay chart.)	—		I'm with You
"Brendan's Death Song"	2012	—	—	—	—	—	—	—	—	—	—		I'm with You
"Dark Necessities"	2016	67	6	52	51	45	47	47	60	39	72	RIAA: Platinum; BPI: Platinum; BVMI: Gold; MC: Gold; RMNZ: 2× Platinum; SNEP: Gold	The Getaway
"Go Robot"	2016	—	26	—	—	123	—	—	—	— (Note: "Go Robot" did not enter the Swiss Singles chart, but charted at number 95 on the Swiss Airplay chart.)	— (Note: "Go Robot" did not enter the UK Singles Chart, but peaked at number 20 on the UK Physical Singles Chart.)		The Getaway
"Sick Love"	2016	—	34	—	—	—	—	—	—	— (Note: "Sick Love" did not enter the Swiss Singles chart, but charted at number 84 on the Swiss Airplay chart.)	—	RMNZ: Gold	The Getaway
"Goodbye Angels"	2017	—	31	—	—	—	—	—	—	—	—		The Getaway
"—" denotes a recording that did not chart or was not released in that territory.

=== 2020s ===
List of singles released in the 2020s, with selected chart positions, showing year released and album name
Title	Year	Peak chart positions										Certifications	Album
Title	Year	US	US Rock	AUS	CAN	GER	IRL	NLD	SWI	UK	WW	Certifications	Album
"Black Summer"	2022	78	10	82	38	67	31	67	40	43	51	RMNZ: Gold	Unlimited Love
"These Are the Ways"	2022	—	38	—	—	—	—	— (Note: "These Are the Ways" did not enter the Netherlands Single Top 100 but peaked on the Netherlands' Single Tip Chart at number 29.)	—	—	—		Unlimited Love
"Tippa My Tongue"	2022	—	18	—	—	— (Note: "Tippa My Tongue" did not enter the German Singles Chart, but peaked at number 88 on the Deutsche Download Singles Chart.)	—	—	—	— (Note: "Tippa My Tongue" did not enter the UK Singles Chart, but peaked at number 71 on the UK Singles Sales Chart.)	—		Return of the Dream Canteen
"Eddie"	2022	—	— (Note: "Eddie" did not enter the Hot Rock & Alternative Songs chart, but peaked at number 21 on the Rock Digital Song Sales chart.)	—	—	—	—	—	—	— (Note: "Eddie" did not enter the UK Singles Chart, but peaked at number 93 on the UK Singles Sales Chart.)	—		Return of the Dream Canteen
"The Drummer"	2022	—	— (Note: "The Drummer" did not enter the Hot Rock & Alternative Songs chart, but peaked at number 21 on the Rock & Alternative Airplay chart.)	—	—	—	—	—	—	—	—		Return of the Dream Canteen
"—" denotes a recording that did not chart or was not released in that territory.

=== Promotional singles ===
List of promotional singles, with selected chart positions, showing year released, certifications and album name
Title	Year	Peak chart positions								Certifications	Album
Title	Year	US Alt.	US Rock	CZ Rock	GER DL	JPN Over.	NZ Hot	POL	UK Sales	Certifications	Album
"Get Up and Jump"	1984	—	—	—	—	—	—	—	—		The Red Hot Chili Peppers
"Jungle Man"	1985	—	—	—	—	—	—	—	—		Freaky Styley
"Hollywood (Africa)"	1985	—	—	—	—	—	—	—	—		Freaky Styley
"For the Thrashers"	1989	—	—	—	—	—	—	—	—		Mother's Milk
"Deck the Halls"	1994	—	—	—	—	—	—	—	—		Out in L.A.
"Parallel Universe"	2001	37	—	—	—	—	—	—	—	RIAA: Gold; RMNZ: Gold	Californication
"Save the Population"	2003	—	—	—	—	—	—	32	—		Greatest Hits
"Did I Let You Know"	2012	—	—	—	—	—	—	—	—		I'm with You
"Poster Child"	2022	— (Note: "Poster Child" did not enter the Alternative Airplay chart, but peaked at number 12 on the Alternative Digital Song Sales chart.)	29	—	—	16	18	—	75		Unlimited Love
"Not the One"	2022	—	—	—	43	—	—	—	—		Unlimited Love
"Nerve Flip"	2022	—	—	—	—	—	—	—	—		Unlimited Love
"The Shape I'm Takin'"	2022	—	—	14	—	—	26	94	—		Return of the Dream Canteen
"—" denotes a recording that did not chart or was not released in that territory.

=== Other singles ===
List of singles, with selected chart positions and notes, showing year released and album name
Title	Year	Peak chart positions				Notes	Album
Title	Year	US Sales	CZ Rock	POL	UK Sales	Notes	Album
"Havana Affair"	2011	14	—	—	—	Released as a limited edition single for Record Store Day.	We're a Happy Family: A Tribute to Ramones
"Strange Man" / "Long Progression"	2012	12	—	—	6	Outtakes from the 2011 album, I'm with You. Released as a part of the I'm with You Sessions single series and I'm Beside You	I'm Beside You
"Magpies on Fire" / "Victorian Machinery"	2012	14	—	—	7	Outtakes from the 2011 album, I'm with You. Released as a part of the I'm with You Sessions single series and I'm Beside You	I'm Beside You
"Never Is a Long Time" / "Love of Your Life"	2012	6	—	—	7	Outtakes from the 2011 album, I'm with You. Released as a part of the I'm with You Sessions single series and I'm Beside You	I'm Beside You
"The Sunset Sleeps" / "Hometown Gypsy"	2012	14	—	34	11	Outtakes from the 2011 album, I'm with You. Released as a part of the I'm with You Sessions single series and I'm Beside You	I'm Beside You
"Pink as Floyd" / "Your Eyes Girl"	2013	12	—	—	13	Outtakes from the 2011 album, I'm with You. Released as a part of the I'm with You Sessions single series and I'm Beside You	I'm Beside You
"In Love Dying"	2013	7	—	—	12	Outtakes from the 2011 album, I'm with You. Released as a part of the I'm with You Sessions single series and I'm Beside You	I'm Beside You
"Catch My Death" / "How It Ends"	2013	9	4	—	16	Outtakes from the 2011 album, I'm with You. Released as a part of the I'm with You Sessions single series and I'm Beside You	I'm Beside You
"This Is the Kitt" / "Brave From Afar"	2013	11	—	—	18	Outtakes from the 2011 album, I'm with You. Released as a part of the I'm with You Sessions single series and I'm Beside You	I'm Beside You
"Hanalei" / "Open/Close"	2013	8	—	—	17	Outtakes from the 2011 album, I'm with You. Released as a part of the I'm with You Sessions single series and I'm Beside You	I'm Beside You
"—" denotes a recording that did not chart or was not released in that territory.

== Other charted and certified songs ==
List of other charted songs, with selected chart positions, showing year released and album name
Title	Year	Peak chart positions						Certifications	Album
Title	Year	US Alt. DL	US Rock	CZ	NZ Hot	POL	UK	Certifications	Album
"Wet Sand"	2006	—	—	—	—	—	—	RMNZ: Gold	Stadium Arcadium
"The Getaway"	2016	16	19	76	—	24	181		The Getaway
"We Turn Red"	2016	—	26	—	—	—	—		The Getaway
"The Longest Wave"	2016	—	32	—	—	—	—		The Getaway
"Encore"	2016	—	46	—	—	—	—		The Getaway
"Here Ever After"	2022	20	37	—	10	—	— (Note: "Here Ever After" did not enter the UK Singles Chart, but peaked at number 85 on the UK Singles Chart Update.)		Unlimited Love
"Aquatic Mouth Dance"	2022	—	48	—	16	—	—		Unlimited Love
"Peace and Love"	2022	—	—	—	29	—	—		Return of the Dream Canteen
"Reach Out"	2022	—	—	—	36	—	—		Return of the Dream Canteen
"Fake as Fu@k"	2022	—	—	—	34	—	—		Return of the Dream Canteen
"—" denotes a recording that did not chart or was not released in that territory.

== Other appearances ==
=== Album appearances ===
List of guest appearances, showing year released and album name
Title	Year	Album
"Taste the Pain" (extended version)	1989	Say Anything...: The Original Motion Picture Soundtrack
"Show Me Your Soul"	1990	Pretty Woman: Original Motion Picture Soundtrack
"Sikamikanico"	1992	Wayne's World: Music from the Motion Picture
"Search and Destroy"	1993	The Beavis and Butt-head Experience
"Soul to Squeeze"	1993	Coneheads: Music from the Motion Picture Soundtrack
"The Power of Equality"	1993	Sub Rock - The Best Of Independent And Grunge
"Blood Sugar Sex Magik" (Live)	1994	Woodstock '94
"Higher Ground"	1995	Mighty Morphin Power Rangers: The Movie - Original Soundtrack Album
"I Found Out"	1995	Working Class Hero: A Tribute to John Lennon
"Melancholy Mechanics"	1996	Twister: Music from the Motion Picture Soundtrack
"Love Rollercoaster"	1996	Beavis and Butt-head Do America: Original Motion Picture Soundtrack
"I Make My Own Rules" (with LL Cool J on vocals, minus Anthony Kiedis)	1997	Private Parts: The Album
"Johnny, Kick a Hole in the Sky"	1997	ESPN Presents X Games
"Higher Ground"	1998	Surf SI
"How Strong"	1999	M.O.M.: Music For Our Mother Ocean 3
"Higher Ground"	1999	Music Inspired By The Motion Picture "You Are Dead
"Fire" (Live)	2000	Woodstock '99
"Havana Affair"	2003	We're a Happy Family: A Tribute to Ramones
"Heart of Gold" (as Johnny Cash's backing band minus Anthony Kiedis)	2003	Unearthed
"Californication" (Live)	2006	Coachella
"I Just Wanna Have Something To Do" (live) "She's the One" (live) "I Wanna Be Sedated" (live) "It's a Long Way Back" (live)	2006	Too Tough to Die: A Tribute to Johnny Ramone
"Let the Good Times Roll" (with George Clinton & Kim Manning)	2009	George Clinton and His Gangsters of Love
"Don't Forget Me"	2013	Ultimate Smallville soundtrack
"Factory of Faith"	2013	Songs For The Philippines

=== Movie appearances ===
List of motion picture appearances by the band
Title	Year	Movie
"Blackeyed Blonde"	1986	Thrashin'
"Set It Straight" (unreleased song)	1986	Tough Guys

Other film/television appearances by the band (music videos, live performances, video games)
Title	Year	Movie
"Higher Ground"	2001	MTV 20: Rock
"Give it Away"	2001	MTV20 Collection
"Give it Away"	2005	The Work Of Director Stéphane Sednaoui
"Can't Stop"	2005	The Work Of Director Mark Romanek
"I Get Around" (live)	2007	Musicares: A Tribute to Brian Wilson
"I Just Wanna Have Something To Do" (live) "She's the One" (live) "I Wanna Be Sedated" (live) "It's a Long Way Back" (live)	2008	Too Tough To Die (A Tribute To Johnny Ramone)
"Higher Ground"	2015	Guitar Hero Live
"Goodbye Angels"(used in television commercials to promote the show's second season)	2017	Animal Kingdom
"Can't Stop" (the song appears during the film however does not appear on the film's soundtrack)	2022	Black Panther: Wakanda Forever
"Can't Stop" (the band appear on the animated series as marionettes in the first episode of season four titled Can't Stop which was based on their 2003 performance at Slane Castle)	2025	Love, Death & Robots

=== Tributes ===
- Silverlake Conservatory of Music All-Stars - Our Loving Tribute to Red Hot Chili Peppers EP (2025)

== Videos ==
=== Video albums ===
List of video albums, with selected chart positions and certifications
Title	Album details	Peak chart positions	Certifications
Title	Album details	US Video	Certifications
Red Hot Skate Rock	Released: 1988 (US); Label: EMI; Format: VHS	—	
Positive Mental Octopus	Released: 1990 (US); Label: EMI; Format: VHS	9	
Psychedelic Sexfunk Live from Heaven	Released: 1990 (US); Label: EMI; Format: VHS	7	RIAA: Gold
Funky Monks	Released: October 29, 1991 (US); Label: Warner Bros.; Formats: VHS, DVD	6	RIAA: Gold; BPI: Gold
What Hits!?	Released: September 29, 1992 (US); Label: EMI, Capitol; Formats: VHS, DVD	14	
Off the Map	Released: December 4, 2001 (US); Label: Warner Bros.; Formats: VHS, DVD	28	ARIA: 2× Platinum; BPI: Gold
Live at Slane Castle	Released: November 18, 2003 (US); Label: Warner Bros.; Formats: DVD, UMD	22	RIAA: Platinum; ARIA: 4× Platinum; BPI: 2× Platinum; MC: Platinum
Greatest Hits and Videos	Released: November 18, 2003 (US); Label: Warner Bros.; Format: DVD	9	ARIA: Platinum; BPI: Gold
iTunes Originals – Red Hot Chili Peppers	Released: September 12, 2006 (US); Label: Warner Bros.; Format: Download	—	
"—" denotes a recording that did not chart or was not released in that territory.

=== Other video releases ===
List of videos, showing year released and director
Title	Year	Director(s)
Red Hot Chili Peppers Live: I'm with You	2011	
Red Hot Chili Peppers: Live from the Basement	2012	Nigel Godrich

=== Music videos ===
List of music videos, showing year released and director
Title	Year	Director(s)
"True Men Don't Kill Coyotes"	1984	Graeme Whifler
"Jungle Man"	1985	Lindy Goetz, Ron Sedgwick, Jim Hancock
Catholic School Girls Rule"	1985	Dick Rude
"Fight Like a Brave"	1987	Dick Rude
"Good Time Boys"	1989	
"Higher Ground"	1989	Bill Stobaugh, Drew Carolan
"Knock Me Down"	1989	Drew Carolan
"Taste the Pain"	1990	Tom Stern, Alex Winter
"Show Me Your Soul"	1990	Bill Stobaugh
"Give It Away"	1991	Stéphane Sednaoui
"Under the Bridge"	1992	Gus Van Sant
"Suck My Kiss"	1992	Gavin Bowden
"Breaking the Girl"	1992	Stéphane Sednaoui
"Behind the Sun"	1992	Charlie Paul
"If You Have to Ask"	1993	—N/a
"Soul to Squeeze"	1993	Kevin Kerslake
"Warped"	1995	Gavin Bowden
"My Friends" (version 1)	1995	Anton Corbijn
"My Friends" (version 2)	1995	Gavin Bowden
"Aeroplane"	1996	Gavin Bowden
"Coffee Shop"	1996	Gavin Bowden
"Love Rollercoaster"	1996	Kevin Lofton
"Scar Tissue"	1999	Stéphane Sednaoui
"Around the World"	1999	Stéphane Sednaoui
"Otherside"	1999	Jonathan Dayton, Valerie Faris
"Californication"	2000	Jonathan Dayton, Valerie Faris
"Road Trippin'"	2000	Jonathan Dayton, Valerie Faris
"By the Way"	2002	Jonathan Dayton, Valerie Faris
"The Zephyr Song"	2002	Jonathan Dayton, Valerie Faris
"Can't Stop"	2003	Mark Romanek
"Universally Speaking"	2003	Dick Rude
"Fortune Faded"	2003	Laurent Briet
"Dani California"	2006	Tony Kaye
"Tell Me Baby"	2006	Jonathan Dayton, Valerie Faris
"Snow (Hey Oh)"	2006	Nick Wickham
"Charlie"	2007	Omri Cohen
"Desecration Smile" (version 1)	2007	Gus Van Sant
"Desecration Smile" (version 2)	2007	Gus Van Sant
"Hump de Bump"	2007	Chris Rock
"The Adventures of Rain Dance Maggie"	2011	Marc Klasfeld
"Monarchy of Roses"	2011	Marc Klasfeld
"Look Around"	2012	Robert Hales
"Brendan's Death Song" (edited version)	2012	Marc Klasfeld
"Brendan's Death Song" (full version)	2012	Marc Klasfeld
"Dark Necessities"	2016	Olivia Wilde
"Go Robot"	2016	Tota Lee
"Sick Love"	2016	Beth Jeans Houghton
"Goodbye Angels"	2017	Thoranna Sigurdardottir aka TOTA
"Black Summer"	2022	Deborah Chow
"Poster Child"	2022	Julien & Thami.
"These Are the Ways"	2022	Malia James
"Tippa My Tongue"	2022	Malia James
"The Drummer"	2022	Phillip R Lopez

== See also ==
- List of songs recorded by Red Hot Chili Peppers
- Red Hot Chili Peppers Official Bootlegs
