= The Getaway World Tour =

2016–17 concert tour by Red Hot Chili Peppers

- World tour by Red Hot Chili Peppers
- Promotional poster for the band's December 2016 UK tour dates with Babymetal
- Location: Worldwide
- Associated album: The Getaway
- Start date: May 22, 2016
- End date: October 18, 2017
- Legs: 5
- No. of shows: 79 in North America; 67 in Europe; 2 in Asia; 3 in Latin America; Total: 151 (4 cancelled)
- Box office: $119.7 million

Red Hot Chili Peppers concert chronology
- Red Hot Chili Peppers 2013–2014 Tour (2013–2014); The Getaway World Tour (2016–2017); Unlimited Love Tour (2022–2024)

The Getaway World Tour was a concert tour by American rock band Red Hot Chili Peppers that was in support of their eleventh studio album, The Getaway which was released on June 17, 2016. It marked the first time since June 2014 that the band has toured. The tour began with benefit shows and North American festival dates in February 2016 followed by a summer festival tour with dates in Europe, Asia and North America starting in May 2016 and ending in August 2016. The headlining tour to support the album began in Europe in September 2016 and lasted until the end of the year with the North American tour beginning in January 2017 and concluded in July 2017. Another European leg and dates in South America followed along with rescheduled shows and festival dates in North America in October 2017 to wrap up the tour. The band had festival dates in March 2018 for South America but they were not considered part of this tour. It was also the band's last tour with their guitarist Josh Klinghoffer before his departure from the band in late December 2019, as their previous guitarist John Frusciante rejoined the group at that time.

The tour placed 32nd on Pollstar's year-end top 100 worldwide tours list for 2016, grossing a total of $46.2 million; it finished as the 18th highest grossing worldwide tour in 2017, grossing $73.5 million.

== Pre-tour benefit shows and North American festivals ==
Prior the summer festival dates in June 2016 and start of their headlining tour in September 2016, the band performed at a few benefit and North American festivals. On February 5, 2016, the band performed in Los Angeles at the FEEL THE BERN political fund-raiser in support of 2016 presidential candidate Bernie Sanders. "Nobody Weird Like Me" made its return to the set list for the first time since the 2006–07 Stadium Arcadium World Tour. The following night, they performed at a private, invitation-only Super Bowl 50 party in San Francisco called "DirecTV Super Saturday Night Co-Hosted by Mark Cuban's AXS TV" where they played "Aeroplane" for the first time since July 1997. The band also performed covers of "Cracked Actor" and "Starman" in tribute to their friend David Bowie, who died the previous month. On April 13, Flea played the national anthem before Kobe Bryant's final NBA game. That night, the Chili Peppers played four song set at an unannounced private show in Los Angeles in support of Sean Parker and The Parker Foundation Launch for The Parker Institute for Cancer Immunotherapy The band performed a sixteen-song set at the Jazz & Heritage Festival on April 24 where they were joined by The Meters for a jam. On April 29, 2016, Chad Smith and Will Ferrell will host the Red Hot Benefit Comedy + Music Show & Quinceanera. The benefit will featured a performance by the Chili Peppers along with comedy acts selected by Ferrell and Funny or Die. A portion of the proceeds will go to Ferrell's Cancer for College and Smith's Silverlake Conservatory of Music. It was announced in March 2016 that the band headline the 25th anniversary Lollapalooza festival in July. The band's May 14, 2016 performance at the KROQ Weenie Roast was suddenly cancelled prior to them going on stage due to Kiedis suffering stomach pains. The following show, an album preview show for The Getaway on May 17, 2016, was postponed until May 26, 2016. "Dark Necessities", the lead single from The Getaway, made its live debut on May 22, 2016. New songs "Go Robot" (the band was joined by Thundercat on bass), "Sick Love", "The Ticonderoga" all made their live debuts on May 26, 2016, at the album preview show for iHeartRadio which aired on DirecTV on June 17, 2016. "The Getaway", the title track to the new album, was released by the band on May 26, 2016, however unknown at the time to fans, the band had teased the song live during their performance of "Give It Away" at Super Bowl 50 party in San Francisco back in February. The song made its full live debut on May 29, 2016.

=== Anthony Kiedis health scare ===
On May 14, the band were forced to cancel their headlining slot at the annual KROQ Weenie Roast as Kiedis was rushed to the hospital prior to the band appearing on stage due to severe stomach pain. Flea alongside, Smith and Klinghoffer made an announcement on the stage as they were due to appear. It was unknown at the time whether upcoming shows would be affected as a result, with Kiedis' mother Peggy posting the following morning on Facebook that "Anthony will be OK. No surgery is needed. I will keep you updated, I promise". It was confirmed that Kiedis was suffering from intestinal flu and was expected to make a full recovery soon, however the band was forced to postpone their iHeartRadio album preview show on May 17, 2016, and has rescheduled it for May 26, 2016. The band returned to the stage on May 22, 2016, in Columbus, Ohio. According to Chad Smith, Kiedis had also suffered from the stomach flu a few weeks earlier. In a May 20, 2016 interview with Entertainment Tonight Canada, his first since being released from the hospital, Kiedis said that his illness was brought on by an "inflammation in my guts"; he also said this was complicated by a recent stomach virus and existing scar tissue from previous hernia operations which required his stomach being pumped at the hospital due to his food not being able to properly digest. "That becomes an incredibly painful situation where you get a fever and pass out... Lo an behold, I'm on the mend" He went on to say "so it turned out to be a good thing, albeit painful and very sad to have to cancel a show. We don't really do that. I'd rather play deathly ill than not play at all, but in this particular instance, I was starting to go down, as in to the ground, so I got rushed to the hospital, got some help, and now I get to figure things out."

== The Getaway world tour ==
The band performing with tube lights over their heads

Singer Anthony Kiedis in a May 5, 2016 interview discussed touring and said they were very excited to have a lot of new songs to play. Kiedis said "this being our second record with Josh, it feels a lot more fulfilling. And, it's always great to have a job as a musician. It's great to be in this band. We love seeing the world. But to have all these new songs at our disposal for live shows makes it feel like 'Let's go. Let's go. We have a mission now. You do this incredible thing in the studio and then you go practice and rehearse and make sure you can play this stuff live and then you go see the world. You know everywhere; from Asia to South America to Europe and Eastern Europe and hopefully the Middle East and Africa and you know, you give this music life to people far far away that it means something to and you have this communal experience together. And when you just can't take it for another day and you're beat and you're haggard and you're tired and you want to collapse and you come home and you gather some new life experience and start writing a little bit and Flea sits down at the piano and says, 'Hey, I have these chords. What do you think about these chords? And I say, hmmm, I hear melody in there and you start it all over again." Drummer Chad Smith said on May 17, 2016, that the band would be playing in Europe for pretty much the remainder of the year once the tour starts with the North American tour not happening until 2017.

All purchases of tickets through the band's website include a free download or physical copy of The Getaway. The production for the arena tour featured over 800 tube lights that stretched out across the audience. Throughout the show they would move up and down and change colour to create different patterns and effects.

=== Summer festivals ===
Promotional poster for the band's concert at Nova Rock in June 2016

The Getaway World Tour got underway on June 4, 2016, with festival dates in Europe, Asia and North America which will last until August 2016.

A day after its release, "We Turn Red" made its live debut on June 10, 2016, at the Pinkpop festival while "Wet Sand" was performed for the first time in over two years. Flea, Anthony and Chad also teased George Clinton's "Bullet Proof", a song they haven't performed in 23 years. During the opening encore jam, Kiedis took over Flea's bass while Flea played keyboards and Klinghoffer played piano. The jam included a tease of The Beatles' "Hey Bulldog". After over three years not being performed, "Tell Me Baby" returned to the setlist on June 12, 2016, at Novarock. The rarely performed "She's Only 18" also made its return after a two-year absence. On June 13, 2016, in a pre-taped segment on The Late Late Show with James Corden, the band appeared in the show's popular Carpool Karaoke segment. During the filming of the segment, Kiedis saved the life of a baby. "a woman came out of her house, holding a child saying 'My baby, my baby, my baby can't breathe!' We all ran across the street, the woman thrust the baby into my arms, the baby was not breathing and I thought 'I’m gonna try and do a little baby CPR real quick, see if I can get some air in this kid.' Tried to open the mouth, [it was] like locked shut. So I started rubbing the belly, bubbles came out of the mouth, the eyes rolled back into place, the ambulance showed up and I handed the baby over, who was now breathing and fine, and we went back to Carpool Karaoke. The little baby looked at me the entire time until the ambulance came, little baby Nina." Kiedis said On June 14, 2016, the band performed eight songs at Studios SFP in France. "Dark Necessities" and "Give it Away" appeared on the television show Le Grand Journal while the remaining six songs, which included the live debut of "The Longest Wave", were recorded for radio station RTL2's "Très Très Privé" concert series. The Live in Paris EP was released on July 1, 2016, and features five songs from the Canal+ performance in Paris. The EP was released exclusively through the music streaming website Deezer. "Detroit" made its live debut on June 29, 2016, at the Roskilde Festival while "Goodbye Angels" made its live debut on July 10, 2016. "Dreams of a Samurai" made its live debut on July 24, 2016, at the Fuji Rock Festival in Japan.

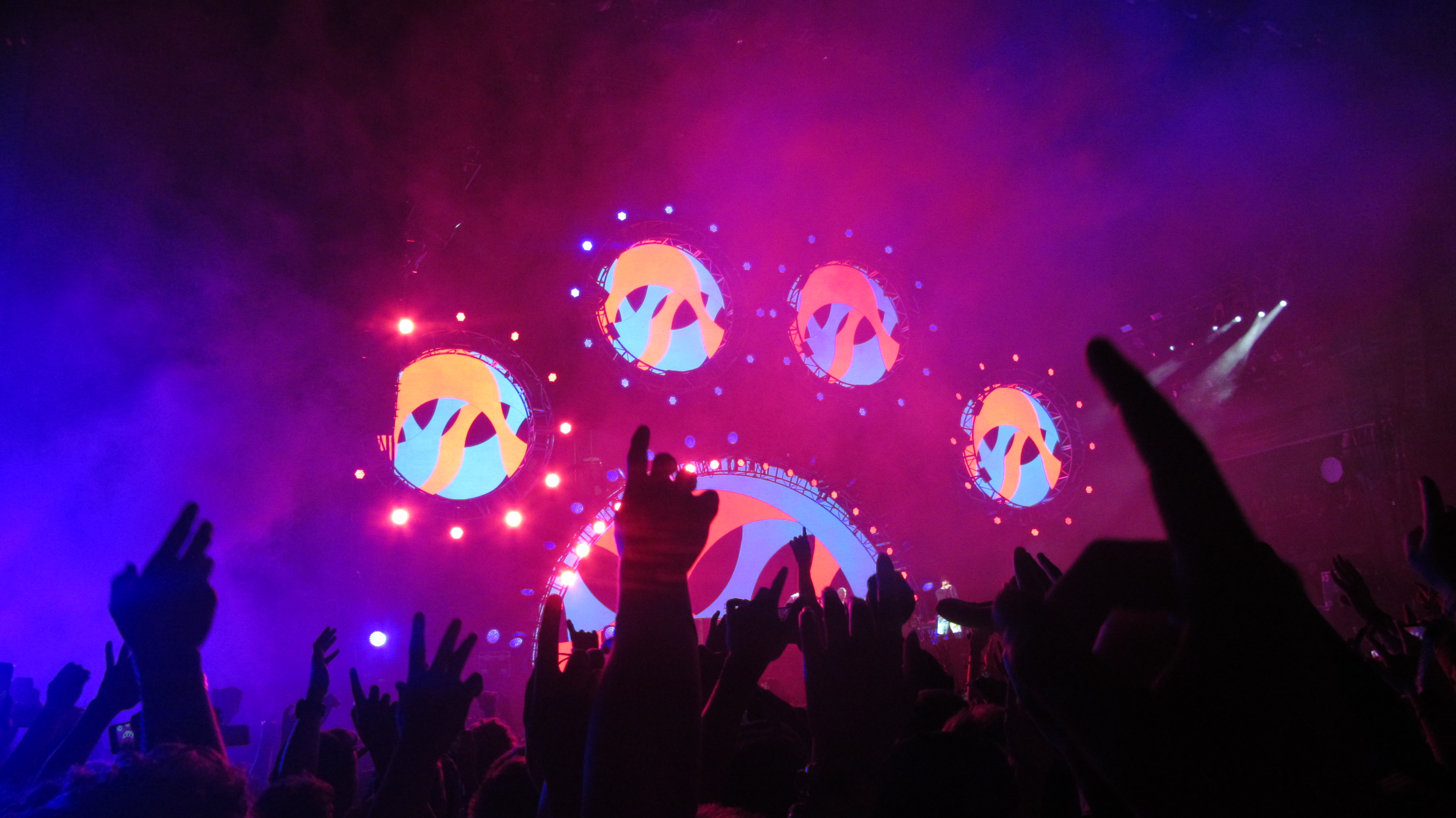
The band using their festival production in Leeds

In an August 2016 interview, Flea discussed touring and playing the same songs saying "Has there ever been a night where I've been like 'If I play fucking 'Give It Away' again my cock's gonna fall off'? Yes. There are moments of having a hard time finding the essence and spirit of a song, but in general it's all about the people in the end. It's all about connecting with the people.I try to keep myself in a place of being completely selfless about it and doing my best to use every song, whether it's one I've heard a million times or a new one, as a vehicle for connecting with people and making them feel less alone in the world."

=== European leg I ===
The band's European headlining tour began on September 1, 2016, and lasted until mid-December 2016. Deap Vally and Babymetal served as the opening acts. "Feasting on the Flowers" made its live debut on September 8, 2016, in Oslo, followed by "The Longest Wave" second time ever played on September 14 in Helsinki. "Search and Destroy" was performed for the first time since 2003 on September 10, 2016, in Sweden and for the first time with Klinghoffer. At the band's show of October 10, 2016 in Italy, Anthony's 9-year-old son Everly Bear joined his father in singing "Dreams of a Samurai". "Don't Forget Me" was briefly teased in tribute to a fan from Peru who died the previous year. The band's show of October 13, 2016 in Montpellier was cancelled due to weather conditions. The band is trying to reschedule the show. "The Zephyr Song" (which was in the band's setlist on November 1, 2016, but dropped in favor of "Soul to Squeeze") was performed for the first time since 2004 and first time with Josh on November 3, 2016. At the band's show of November 9, 2016 in Amsterdam they performed "Mommy Where's Daddy?". This was only the third time since 1999 the song has been performed. They had previously performed the song acoustically in September 2016 and once in September 2015. "Emit Remmus" was performed for the first time since 2012 while "Catholic School Girls Rule" and "Freaky Styley" were for teased at during the band's show of November 16, 2016 in Denmark. On November 17, 2016, in Germany the band performed "Yertle the Turtle" for the first time since 2001. The song was dedicated to one of the band's longtime fans who had been following them on the tour. Due to Kiedis suffering from flu like symptoms, the band was forced to postpone their December 20 and 21 shows in Ireland until September 20 and 21, 2017.

=== Los Angeles Rams opener and Silverlake performances ===
The band performed two songs before the opening home game of the Los Angeles Rams at the Los Angeles Memorial Coliseum on September 18, 2016. The Rams made their return to Los Angeles after 22 years in St. Louis. "Since I was a little boy, I've taken joy in the beauty of the Rams. When I moved to Los Angeles in 1972, I was getting uprooted from my home and I thought, 'Well, where I'm going they've got the Rams. It's going to be all right'" Flea said. On September 23, 2016, the band performed a short acoustic set at a benefit for the Silverlake Conservatory of Music. "Mommy, Where's Daddy?" from the band's debut album was performed for only the second time in the past 17 years (it was last performed in late 2015) and for the first time ever acoustically.

=== North American leg I ===
The band's 51 date North American leg began on January 5, 2017, and concluded on July 1, 2017. Due to overwhelming demand for tickets after selling out quickly and in response to scalpers, second shows in Boston and Philadelphia were added while second and third shows in New York City and Los Angeles were also added. Jack Irons, the band's original drummer and founding member of the band, will serve as opening act on all North American dates while Trombone Shorty and Orleans Avenue, Babymetal, IRONTOM and Deerhoof will serve as opening acts at various dates on the leg. At the opening show on the North American leg in San Antonio on January 5, 2017, the band performed "Breaking the Girl" for the first time since October 2012. "The Zephyr Song" was performed for the first time in the United States since July 2004 during the band's show of January 8, 2017 in Dallas, Texas. At that same show, Josh teased a cover of David Bowie's "The Bewlay Brothers" as a tribute to Bowie who died a year earlier on January 9, 2016. Members of The Meters, The Rebirth Brass Band and Trombone Shorty joined the band on "Give it Away" during their show of January 10, 2017 in New Orleans. The band was forced to postpone their Wichita show on January 15, 2017, to the following night due to inclement weather. On February 13, at their Philadelphia gig band teased 50 seconds version of "Out in L.A", in honor of their 34th anniversary. It was first time that song was performed since 1992 (according to some sources 2004) and first time with Josh. On March 2, 2017, the band announced that they were going to postpone their March 2, 4, 5 shows in Glendale, Denver and San Diego due to Anthony suffering from bronchitis. The San Diego date was rescheduled for later in the month while the other two dates were pushed back to October 2017. On March 17, 2017, at their show in Seattle, the band performed "Charlie" for the first time since 2012. On April 24, 2017, at their show in Jacksonville, "Encore" made its live debut, after some teases throughout the previous tours. At the band's show in Pittsburgh on May 11, 2017, they performed a cover of the Looking Glass song "Brandy (You're a Fine Girl)". The song was last performed in 2005 and played at most shows during their Roll on the Red tour. It also appeared on their Red Hot Chili Peppers Live in Hyde Park album. Following the band's performance of May 14, 2017 in Columbus, Ohio, Chad Smith sang the University of Michigan fight song "The Victors". Smith's singing of the fight song made national news as the University of Michigan and Ohio State University are longtime sports rivals and Smith was born in Detroit. Smith's drumset also like at past shows in Ohio featured the Michigan Wolverines logo. At the band's show of May 16, 2017 in Louisville, Kentucky, "Mommy, Where's Daddy?" was performed. The song, which is very rarely played, was last performed in November 2016 has been performed just four times since 1992 and only three times in the United States since then. "This Ticonderoga" was also performed for just the third time and first time since September 2016. At the band's show of May 18, 2017 in Indianapolis, Josh performed a cover of "Seasons" by Chris Cornell. Cornell, the front man for Soundgarden and Audioslave, was found dead earlier that day. At the band's show on May 28, 2017, in Edmonton they performed "Dosed" for the first time ever. It was teased in the past but the song had never been performed in its entirety since it was released in 2002. Zach Irons, son of founding Chili Peppers member Jack Irons and guitarist for opening act IRONTOM, provided a second guitar on the song. At this same show, Flea also briefly teased "Deep Kick", a song that hasn't been performed since 1996. On June 20, at the band's gig in Montreal, band's cover of Jimi Hendrix's song, a rarely performed "Fire" was played for the first time since November 2016 and for the second time in United States since By the Way Tour in 2003 (first time in September 2015, not counting Silverlake charity event in following month where it was performed acoustically). During the band's show on June 25, 2017, in Grand Rapids, Anthony Kiedis dedicated "Soul to Squeeze" to his father, Blackie Dammett, who was the long time manager of the band's fanclub and ran their website. Kiedis said "If you could be so kind. My father is fixin' to die and that's OK. He's had a wild, great journey and a helluva colourful badass life but he's sick and he's gonna to die now.. He's pretty lost; he's just a spirit but I would like for everyone just to take ten seconds to send him some love, to send his spirit some love because pretty soon he will be sailing on and I would appreciate it if his home town could send him love for a whole ten seconds of love. Let's give it up. Ten! Thank you. Let's do this tune. Appreciate it." Flea also during the show asked for a moment of silence for Hillel Slovak, the band's founding guitarist who died 29 years earlier. Following the moment of silence, Jack Irons joined his former band on stage to perform Jimi Hendrix's "Fire" as a tribute to Slovak.

Dave Rat, who has been with the band since February 1991 as the band's sound engineer, announced on January 12, 2017, that he would no longer be working with the band following their show of January 22, 2017 in Minnesota.

At the band's show in Atlanta on April 14, 2017, they shot the music video for their song "Goodbye Angels". Chad Smith told the fans on Twitter to "wear something colorful." The video was released on May 9, 2017.

=== European leg II ===
The band returned to Europe for a second leg starting on July 13, 2017. The leg will consist of mostly festivals along with some headlining dates with the leg expected to conclude on July 31, 2017. The second date on the leg saw the band perform for the first time ever in Benicàssim. The show featured a rare performance of "Fire" which was performed for only the fifth time on this tour. Mauro Refosco, who was a touring member of the band for their previous tour and also a studio musician on their two most recent albums, joined the band on percussion for "The Adventures of Rain Dance Maggie" at their July 20, 2017 show in Rome. Kiedis' young son Everly Bear also joined the band onstage to provide some vocals for "Goodbye Angels" which he also would do at the band's very first show in Latvia seven days later.

=== Dublin rescheduled shows ===
Due to Anthony Kiedis suffering from the flu, the band's shows on December 20 and 21, 2016 in Dublin at 3Arena were forced to be postponed and were rescheduled for September 20 and 21, 2017 at the same venue. During the band's show on September 21 in Dublin they performed "Get on Top" for the first time with Josh and for the first time since August 2007.

=== Latin American leg ===
On September 24, 2016, the first date of the leg was confirmed for September 24, 2017 at Rock in Rio. On February 20, 2017, it was announced that the band would perform in Mexico City on October 10, 2017.

=== North America rescheduled dates ===
Due to Anthony Kiedis suffering from bronchitis, the band was forced to postpone three shows in March 2017 with two of the shows in Denver and Glendale being rescheduled for October 16 and 18, 2017. The band performed at the Austin City Limits Music Festival that on October 7 and 14, 2017 where Josh Klinghoffer performed "A Face in the Crowd" as a tribute to Tom Petty, who had recently died. Their performance of "What is Soul?" on October 7, 2017, was also dedicated to Petty. The tour officially ended on October 18, 2017, in Arizona.

== Critical reception ==
The band's concert in Toronto received criticism from Canadian radio broadcaster Alan Cross. In his review of the concert, titled "An Exceptionally Honest Review of the Red Hot Chili Peppers in Toronto", Cross wrote that the concert "lacked Red Hotness". He stated that the band was "tardy" in getting to the stage and said that the band telling the audience "how long they had been coming to Toronto and how special we were to them", was something they “must say to all the girls…I mean cities.” Cross wrote that he expected more interaction with the audience and thought that the performance "felt a little cold". Cross further wrote, "I thought we had something special, as most virgins do, but sadly we were just another notch on a tour belt. Where was our love? The love that was going to help justify paying over a hundred bucks to sit in the middle of nowhere? The love that would probably get us to pay it again and again?" Cross claimed that the band gave a “K thanks bye” exit off the stage and wrote on the reaction of fellow concert attendees. "Shocked. Stunned. Pissed. We began making our way to the exits. “What the hell was THAT!?” was the general consensus as we all poured out of the stadium. My eyes continuously locked with other concert-goers, who were also wearing the disappointment on their face." Cross criticized the band for not playing longer than an hour and a half, stating, "Why can’t you be more like your younger brother Dave Grohl? Who can tear the roof off the Molson Amphitheater for three plus hours, pay the fine for going over his set time, all whilst sitting in a chair with a broken leg."

== Tour dates ==
List of concerts, showing date, city, country, venue, opening act, tickets sold, number of available tickets and amount of gross revenue
Date	City	Country	Venue	Opening act	Attendance	Revenue
Warm-up Shows – North America
February 5, 2016	Los Angeles	United States	Feel the Bern Benefit	—N/a	—N/a	—N/a
February 6, 2016	San Francisco	United States	DirecTV Super Saturday Night	—N/a	—N/a	—N/a
April 13, 2016	Los Angeles	United States	Parker Institute for Cancer Immunotherapy Gala	—N/a	—N/a	—N/a
April 24, 2016	New Orleans	United States	Jazz & Heritage Festival	—N/a	—N/a	—N/a
April 29, 2016	Los Angeles	United States	Will Ferrell & Chad Smith's Red Hot Benefit Comedy + Music Show & Quinceañera	—N/a	—N/a	—N/a
Summer festival tour – Europe, North America and Asia
May 22, 2016	Columbus	United States	Rock on the Range	—N/a	—N/a	—N/a
May 26, 2016	Burbank	United States	iHeartRadio Theater	—N/a	—N/a	—N/a
May 29, 2016	Napa	United States	BottleRock Napa Valley	—N/a	—N/a	—N/a
June 4, 2016	Mendig	Germany	Rock am Ring	—N/a	—N/a	—N/a
June 5, 2016	Nuremberg	Germany	Rock im Park	—N/a	—N/a	—N/a
June 8, 2016	Interlaken	Switzerland	Greenfield Festival	—N/a	—N/a	—N/a
June 10, 2016	Landgraaf	Netherlands	Pinkpop	—N/a	—N/a	—N/a
June 12, 2016	Nickelsdorf	Austria	Novarock	—N/a	—N/a	—N/a
June 14, 2016	Paris	France	Le Grand Journal/RTL2	—N/a	—N/a	—N/a
June 29, 2016	Roskilde	Denmark	Roskilde Festival	—N/a	—N/a	—N/a
June 30, 2016	Gdynia	Poland	Open'er Festival	—N/a	—N/a	—N/a
July 2, 2016	Werchter	Belgium	Rock Werchter	—N/a	—N/a	—N/a
July 6, 2016	Kyiv	Ukraine	U-Park Festival	—N/a	—N/a	—N/a
July 9, 2016	Moscow	Russia	Park Live Festival	—N/a	—N/a	—N/a
July 10, 2016	Perthshire	Scotland	T in the Park	—N/a	—N/a	—N/a
July 15, 2016	Ottawa	Canada	Ottawa Bluesfest	—N/a	—N/a	—N/a
July 16, 2016	Quebec City	Canada	Quebec City Summer Festival	—N/a	—N/a	—N/a
July 22, 2016	Ansan	South Korea	Jisan Valley Rock Festival	—N/a	—N/a	—N/a
July 24, 2016	Yuzawa	Japan	Fuji Rock Festival	—N/a	—N/a	—N/a
July 29, 2016	Montreal	Canada	Osheaga Festival	—N/a	—N/a	—N/a
July 30, 2016	Chicago	United States	Lollapalooza	—N/a	—N/a	—N/a
August 25, 2016	Belfast	Northern Ireland	Tennent's Vital	—N/a	37,255 / 37,255	$2,026,562
August 27, 2016	Reading	England	Reading Festival	—N/a	—N/a	—N/a
August 28, 2016	Leeds	England	Leeds Festival	—N/a	—N/a	—N/a
Headlining tour – European leg I
September 1, 2016	Budapest	Hungary	László Papp Budapest Sports Arena	Deap Vally	—N/a	—N/a
September 2, 2016	Budapest	Hungary	László Papp Budapest Sports Arena	Deap Vally	—N/a	—N/a
September 4, 2016	Prague	Czech Republic	O2 Arena	Deap Vally	—N/a	—N/a
September 6, 2016	Berlin	Germany	Telekom Street Gig	Deap Vally	—N/a	—N/a
September 8, 2016	Oslo	Norway	Telenor Arena	Deap Vally	—N/a	—N/a
September 10, 2016	Stockholm	Sweden	Tele2 Arena	Deap Vally	—N/a	—N/a
September 13, 2016	Helsinki	Finland	Hartwall Arena	Battles	—N/a	—N/a
September 14, 2016	Helsinki	Finland	Hartwall Arena	Battles	—N/a	—N/a
North America
September 18, 2016	Los Angeles	United States	Los Angeles Rams pre-game performance	—N/a	—N/a	—N/a
September 23, 2016	Los Angeles	United States	Silverlake Conservatory of Music benefit	—N/a	—N/a	—N/a
Headlining tour – European leg I
September 27, 2016	Madrid	Spain	Barclaycard Center	BADBADNOTGOOD	—N/a	—N/a
September 28, 2016	Madrid	Spain	Barclaycard Center	BADBADNOTGOOD	—N/a	—N/a
October 1, 2016	Barcelona	Spain	Palau Sant Jordi	BADBADNOTGOOD	—N/a	—N/a
October 2, 2016	Barcelona	Spain	Palau Sant Jordi	BADBADNOTGOOD	—N/a	—N/a
October 5, 2016	Zürich	Switzerland	Hallenstadion	La Femme	27,155 / 27,155	$2,799,690
October 6, 2016	Zürich	Switzerland	Hallenstadion	La Femme	27,155 / 27,155	$2,799,690
October 8, 2016	Bologna	Italy	Unipol Arena	La Femme	—N/a	—N/a
October 10, 2016	Turin	Italy	Pala Alpitour	La Femme	—N/a	—N/a
October 11, 2016	Turin	Italy	Pala Alpitour	La Femme	—N/a	—N/a
October 15, 2016	Paris	France	AccorHotels Arena	La Femme	—N/a	—N/a
October 16, 2016	Paris	France	AccorHotels Arena	La Femme	—N/a	—N/a
October 18, 2016	Paris	France	AccorHotels Arena	La Femme	—N/a	—N/a
North America
October 28, 2016	Los Angeles	United States	KROQ's Halloween Costume Ball	—N/a	—N/a	—N/a
Headlining tour – European leg I
November 1, 2016	Munich	Germany	Olympiahalle	Deerhoof	—N/a	—N/a
November 3, 2016	Berlin	Germany	Mercedes-Benz Arena	Deerhoof	—N/a	—N/a
November 6, 2016	Antwerp	Belgium	Sportpaleis	Deerhoof	21,099 / 21,230	$1,393,360
November 8, 2016	Amsterdam	Netherlands	Ziggo Dome	Deerhoof	—N/a	—N/a
November 9, 2016	Amsterdam	Netherlands	Ziggo Dome	Deerhoof	—N/a	—N/a
November 11, 2016	Esch-sur-Alzette	Luxembourg	Rockhal	Deerhoof	—N/a	—N/a
November 14, 2016	Cologne	Germany	Lanxess Arena	Deerhoof	—N/a	—N/a
November 16, 2016	Herning	Denmark	Jyske Bank Boxen	Deerhoof	—N/a	—N/a
November 17, 2016	Hanover	Germany	TUI Arena	Deerhoof	—N/a	—N/a
November 19, 2016	Frankfurt	Germany	Festhalle	Deerhoof	—N/a	—N/a
November 21, 2016	Vienna	Austria	Wiener Stadthalle	Deerhoof	—N/a	—N/a
December 5, 2016	London	England	The O2 Arena	Babymetal	35,508 / 36,746	$2,842,300
December 6, 2016	London	England	The O2 Arena	Babymetal	35,508 / 36,746	$2,842,300
December 8, 2016	Glasgow	Scotland	The SSE Hydro	Babymetal	12,240 / 12,363	$1,052,170
December 10, 2016	Birmingham	England	Genting Arena	Babymetal	—N/a	—N/a
December 11, 2016	Birmingham	England	Genting Arena	Babymetal	—N/a	—N/a
December 14, 2016	Manchester	England	Manchester Arena	Babymetal	29,936 / 32,339	$2,356,080
December 15, 2016	Manchester	England	Manchester Arena	Babymetal	29,936 / 32,339	$2,356,080
December 18, 2016	London	England	O2 Arena	Babymetal	17,696 / 18,371	$1,475,250
Headlining tour – North American leg
January 5, 2017	San Antonio	United States	AT&T Center	Trombone Shorty and Orleans Avenue; Jack Irons	14,209 / 14,504	$1,090,036
January 7, 2017	Houston	United States	Toyota Center	Trombone Shorty and Orleans Avenue; Jack Irons	12,615 / 12,615	$1,133,116
January 8, 2017	Dallas	United States	American Airlines Center	Trombone Shorty and Orleans Avenue; Jack Irons	13,509 / 14,373	$1,127,341
January 10, 2017	New Orleans	United States	Smoothie King Center	Trombone Shorty and Orleans Avenue; Jack Irons	13,179 / 13,179	$1,040,134
January 12, 2017	Memphis	United States	FedExForum	Trombone Shorty and Orleans Avenue; Jack Irons	12,002 / 12,002	$1,015,832
January 14, 2017	Tulsa	United States	BOK Center	Trombone Shorty and Orleans Avenue; Jack Irons	11,764 / 11,764	$1,058,948
January 16, 2017	Wichita	United States	Intrust Bank Arena	Trombone Shorty and Orleans Avenue; Jack Irons	9,352 / 11,036	$830,152
January 18, 2017	St. Louis	United States	Scottrade Center	Trombone Shorty and Orleans Avenue; Jack Irons	13,836 / 13,836	$1,208,732
January 20, 2017	Lincoln	United States	Pinnacle Bank Arena	Trombone Shorty and Orleans Avenue; Jack Irons		
January 21, 2017	Minneapolis	United States	Target Center	Trombone Shorty and Orleans Avenue; Jack Irons		
February 2, 2017	Detroit	United States	Joe Louis Arena	Trombone Shorty and Orleans Avenue; Jack Irons	15,500 / 15,951	$1,146,840
February 4, 2017	Toronto	Canada	Air Canada Centre	Trombone Shorty and Orleans Avenue; Jack Irons	15,118 / 15,118	$1,309,460
February 7, 2017	Boston	United States	TD Garden	Trombone Shorty and Orleans Avenue; Jack Irons	26,145 / 26,145	$2,435,608
February 8, 2017	Boston	United States	TD Garden	Trombone Shorty and Orleans Avenue; Jack Irons	26,145 / 26,145	$2,435,608
February 10, 2017	Buffalo	United States	KeyBank Center	Trombone Shorty and Orleans Avenue; Jack Irons	14,668 / 14,668	$1,334,965
February 12, 2017	Philadelphia	United States	Wells Fargo Center	Trombone Shorty and Orleans Avenue; Jack Irons	29,697 / 30,804	$2,452,750
February 13, 2017	Philadelphia	United States	Wells Fargo Center	Trombone Shorty and Orleans Avenue; Jack Irons	29,697 / 30,804	$2,452,750
February 15, 2017	New York City	United States	Madison Square Garden	Trombone Shorty and Orleans Avenue; Jack Irons	45,218 / 45,218	$4,287,735
February 17, 2017	New York City	United States	Madison Square Garden	Trombone Shorty and Orleans Avenue; Jack Irons	45,218 / 45,218	$4,287,735
February 18, 2017	New York City	United States	Madison Square Garden	Trombone Shorty and Orleans Avenue; Jack Irons	45,218 / 45,218	$4,287,735
March 7, 2017	Los Angeles	United States	Staples Center	Trombone Shorty and Orleans Avenue; Jack Irons	40,383 / 40,383	$3,553,466
March 8, 2017	Los Angeles	United States	Staples Center	Trombone Shorty and Orleans Avenue; Jack Irons	40,383 / 40,383	$3,553,466
March 10, 2017	Los Angeles	United States	Staples Center	Trombone Shorty and Orleans Avenue; Jack Irons	40,383 / 40,383	$3,553,466
March 12, 2017	Oakland	United States	Oracle Arena	Trombone Shorty and Orleans Avenue; Jack Irons	13,766 / 13,766	$1,273,634
March 15, 2017	Portland	United States	Moda Center	Trombone Shorty and Orleans Avenue; Jack Irons	13,446 / 13,446	$1,158,294
March 17, 2017	Seattle	United States	Key Arena	Trombone Shorty and Orleans Avenue; Jack Irons	11,971 / 12,322	$980,089
March 18, 2017	Vancouver	Canada	Rogers Arena	Trombone Shorty and Orleans Avenue; Jack Irons	14,556 / 14,556	$1,177,090
March 21, 2017	San Diego	United States	Valley View Casino Center	Trombone Shorty and Orleans Avenue; Jack Irons	10,398 / 10,398	$1,029,938
Europe
April 8, 2017 (Note: The show on April 8, 2017, in Venice, Italy was a private performance for artist Damien Hirst's new exhibition "Treasures from the Wreck of the Unbelievable")	Venice	Italy	Arsenale di Venezia	—N/a		
Headlining tour – North American leg
April 12, 2017	Washington, D.C.	United States	Verizon Center	Babymetal; Jack Irons	13,745 / 13,745	$1,263,790
April 14, 2017	Atlanta	United States	Philips Arena	Babymetal; Jack Irons	13,104 / 13,104	$1,225,612
April 15, 2017	Raleigh	United States	PNC Arena	Babymetal; Jack Irons		
April 17, 2017	Charlotte	United States	Spectrum Center	Babymetal; Jack Irons	12,577 / 14,553	$869,926
April 19, 2017	Columbia	United States	Colonial Life Arena	Babymetal; Jack Irons	10,182 / 13,294	$743,956
April 22, 2017	North Little Rock	United States	Verizon Arena	Babymetal; Jack Irons	9,332 / 10,344	$812,574
April 24, 2017	Jacksonville	United States	Jacksonville Veterans Memorial Arena	Babymetal; Jack Irons	11,640 / 11,640	$1,050,900
April 26, 2017	Orlando	United States	Amway Center	Babymetal; Jack Irons	12,557 / 12,557	$1,178,414
April 27, 2017	Tampa	United States	Amalie Arena	Babymetal; Jack Irons	12,750 / 12,750	$1,173,543
April 29, 2017	Miami	United States	American Airlines Arena	Babymetal; Jack Irons	13,554 / 13,554	$1,314,362
May 11, 2017	Pittsburgh	United States	PPG Paints Arena	IRONTOM; Jack Irons		
May 13, 2017	Cleveland	United States	Quicken Loans Arena	IRONTOM; Jack Irons	13,117 / 16,436	$1,018,146
May 14, 2017	Columbus	United States	Schottenstein Center	IRONTOM; Jack Irons	10,738 / 10,738	$937,745
May 16, 2017	Louisville	United States	KFC Yum! Center	IRONTOM; Jack Irons	11,579 / 11,579	$1,047,901
May 18, 2017	Indianapolis	United States	Bankers Life Fieldhouse	IRONTOM; Jack Irons	12,307 / 12,307	$1,126,207
May 19, 2017	Cincinnati	United States	U.S. Bank Arena	IRONTOM; Jack Irons	10,358 / 10,358	$923,784
May 21, 2017	Kansas City	United States	Sprint Center	IRONTOM; Jack Irons	11,726 / 11,726	$1,065,646
May 23, 2017	Des Moines	United States	Wells Fargo Arena	IRONTOM; Jack Irons	10,947 / 10,947	$953,133
May 26, 2017	Winnipeg	Canada	MTS Centre	IRONTOM; Jack Irons		
May 28, 2017	Edmonton	Canada	Rogers Place	IRONTOM; Jack Irons		
May 29, 2017	Calgary	Canada	Scotiabank Saddledome	IRONTOM; Jack Irons		
June 10, 2017	Manchester	United States	Bonnaroo	—N/a		
June 20, 2017	Montreal	Canada	Bell Centre	Deerhoof; Jack Irons	13,049 / 14,867	$1,047,050
June 22, 2017	Hamilton	Canada	FirstOntario Centre	Deerhoof; Jack Irons		
June 23, 2017	Ottawa	Canada	Canadian Tire Centre	Deerhoof; Jack Irons		
June 25, 2017	Grand Rapids	United States	Van Andel Arena	Deerhoof; Jack Irons	10,975 / 10,975	$969,700
June 28, 2017 (Note: The show on June 28, 2017, in Milwaukee is a part of Summerfest.)	Milwaukee	United States	Marcus Amphitheater	—N/a		
June 30, 2017	Chicago	United States	United Center	Deerhoof; Jack Irons	27,356 / 27,356	$2,507,894
July 1, 2017	Chicago	United States	United Center	Deerhoof; Jack Irons	27,356 / 27,356	$2,507,894
Headlining tour – European leg II
July 13, 2017	Lisbon	Portugal	Super Bock Super Rock	—N/a		
July 15, 2017	Benicàssim	Spain	Festival Internacional de Benicàssim	—N/a		
July 18, 2017	Nyon	Switzerland	Paléo Festival	—N/a		
July 20, 2017	Rome	Italy	Ippodromo Capanelle	KNOWER		
July 21, 2017	Milan	Italy	Ippodromo del galoppo di San Siro	KNOWER		
July 23, 2017	Paris	France	Lollapalooza	—N/a		
July 25, 2017	Kraków	Poland	Cracovia Stadium	KNOWER		
July 27, 2017	Riga	Latvia	Lucavsala	KNOWER		
July 29, 2017	Helsinki	Finland	Kaisafest	—N/a		
July 31, 2017	Reykjavík	Iceland	Nyja Laugardalshollin	—N/a		
North America (benefit and festival appearances)
September 9, 2017	Los Angeles	United States	Silverlake Conservatory of Music	—N/a		
September 15, 2017 (Note: The show on September 15, 2017, in Del Mar is a part of the KAABOO Del Mar festival)	Del Mar	United States	Del Mar Racetrack + Fairgrounds	—N/a		
September 17, 2017 (Note: The show on September 17, 2017 in Queens is part of The Meadows Music & Arts Festival.)	Flushing	United States	Citi Field	—N/a		
Headlining tour – Europe (rescheduled shows from December 2016)
September 20, 2017	Dublin	Ireland	3Arena	Lady Leshurr		
September 21, 2017	Dublin	Ireland	3Arena	Lady Leshurr		
Headlining tour – South America
September 24, 2017 (Note: The show on September 24, 2017, in Rio de Janeiro is a part of the Rock in Rio festival.)	Rio de Janeiro	Brazil	Barra Olympic Park	—N/a		
North America (includes rescheduled shows from March 2017)
October 7, 2017 (Note: The show on October 7, 2017, in Austin is part of the Austin City Limits Music Festival.)	Austin	United States	Zilker Park	—N/a		
October 10, 2017	Mexico City	Mexico	Palacio de los Deportes	Louis Cole		
October 11, 2017	Mexico City	Mexico	Palacio de los Deportes	Louis Cole		
October 14, 2017 (Note: The show on October 14, 2017, in Austin is part of the Austin City Limits Music Festival.)	Austin	United States	Zilker Park	—N/a		
October 16, 2017	Denver	United States	Pepsi Center	Trombone Shorty and Orleans Avenue; Jack Irons	13,323 / 13,323	$1,260,381
October 18, 2017	Glendale	United States	Gila River Arena	Trombone Shorty and Orleans Avenue; Jack Irons	13,343 / 13,343	$1,273,486

=== Cancelled/postponed shows ===
List of cancelled and postponed concerts, showing date, city, country, venue and reason for cancellation/postponement
Date	City	Country	Venue	Reason/Additional Info
North America
May 14, 2016	Irvine	United States	Irvine Meadows Amphitheatre	KROQ Weenie Roast performance was cancelled when Anthony Kiedis was rushed to hospital prior to show due to stomach pains
May 17, 2016	Burbank	United States	iHeartRadio Theater	iHeartRadio album preview performance was postponed due to Kiedis recovering from intestinal flu – rescheduled for May 26
Europe
October 13, 2016	Montpellier	France	Park&Suites Arena	Cancelled due to weather conditions. No rescheduled date has been announced
December 20, 2016	Dublin	Ireland	3Arena	Postponed due to Anthony suffering from the flu. Rescheduled for September 20 and 21, 2017
December 21, 2016	Dublin	Ireland	3Arena	Postponed due to Anthony suffering from the flu. Rescheduled for September 20 and 21, 2017
North America
January 15, 2017	Wichita	United States	Intrust Bank Arena	Postponed due to inclement weather and rescheduled for following night
March 2, 2017	Denver	United States	Pepsi Center	Postponed due to Anthony suffering from bronchitis. Rescheduled for October 16, 2017
March 4, 2017	Glendale	United States	Gila River Arena	Postponed due to Anthony suffering from bronchitis. Rescheduled for October 18, 2017
March 5, 2017	San Diego	United States	Valley View Casino Center	Postponed due to Anthony suffering from bronchitis. Rescheduled for March 21, 2017
June 18, 2017	Quebec City	Canada	Centre Vidéotron	Cancelled due to a scheduling conflict. Refunds were given to fans who had purchased tickets.

== Songs performed ==
=== Originals ===
Song	Album
"Baby Appeal" (tease)	The Red Hot Chili Peppers
"Get Up and Jump" (tease)	The Red Hot Chili Peppers
"Mommy, Where's Daddy?"	The Red Hot Chili Peppers
"Out in L.A." (tease)	The Red Hot Chili Peppers
"Police Helicopter"	The Red Hot Chili Peppers
"Catholic School Girls Rule" (tease)	Freaky Styley
"Freaky Styley"	Freaky Styley
"Yertle the Turtle"	Freaky Styley
"Fight Like a Brave" (tease)	The Uplift Mofo Party Plan
"Funky Crime" (tease)	The Uplift Mofo Party Plan
"Me and My Friends"	The Uplift Mofo Party Plan
"Skinny Sweaty Man" (tease)	The Uplift Mofo Party Plan
"Fire" (The Jimi Hendrix Experience)	The Abbey Road E.P.
"Higher Ground" (Stevie Wonder)	Mother's Milk
"Magic Johnson" (tease)	Mother's Milk
"Nobody Weird Like Me"	Mother's Milk
"Stone Cold Bush" (tease)	Mother's Milk
"Blood Sugar Sex Magik"	Blood Sugar Sex Magik
"Give It Away"	Blood Sugar Sex Magik
"Breaking the Girl"	Blood Sugar Sex Magik
"I Could Have Lied"	Blood Sugar Sex Magik
"If You Have to Ask"	Blood Sugar Sex Magik
"The Power of Equality"	Blood Sugar Sex Magik
"Sir Psycho Sexy"	Blood Sugar Sex Magik
"Suck My Kiss"	Blood Sugar Sex Magik
"They're Red Hot" (Robert Johnson)	Blood Sugar Sex Magik
"Under the Bridge"	Blood Sugar Sex Magik
"Search and Destroy" (The Stooges)	The Beavis and Butt-Head Experience
"Soul to Squeeze"	Coneheads: Music from the Motion Picture Soundtrack
"Aeroplane"	One Hot Minute
"Deep Kick" (tease)	One Hot Minute
"Let's Make Evil" (tease)	One Hot Minute
"Pea"	One Hot Minute
"Around the World"	Californication
"Californication"	Californication
"Emit Remmus"	Californication
"Get on Top"	Californication
"I Like Dirt"	Californication
"Otherside"	Californication
"Parallel Universe"	Californication
"Right on Time"	Californication
"Scar Tissue"	Californication
"Road Trippin'" (tease)	Californication
"By the Way"	By the Way
"Can't Stop"	By the Way
"Don't Forget Me"	By the Way
"Dosed"	By the Way
"This Is the Place" (tease)	By the Way
"Universally Speaking"	By the Way
"The Zephyr Song"	By the Way
"Brandy (You're a Fine Girl)" (Looking Glass)	Red Hot Chili Peppers Live in Hyde Park
"Charlie"	Stadium Arcadium
"Dani California"	Stadium Arcadium
"Hard to Concentrate"	Stadium Arcadium
"Hey"	Stadium Arcadium
"She's Only 18"	Stadium Arcadium
"Snow ((Hey Oh))"	Stadium Arcadium
"Tell Me Baby"	Stadium Arcadium
"Wet Sand"	Stadium Arcadium
"The Adventures of Rain Dance Maggie"	I'm with You
"Did I Let You Know"	I'm with You
"Ethiopia"	I'm with You
"Factory of Faith"	I'm with You
"Look Around"	I'm with You
"Pink As Floyd" (tease)	I'm Beside You
"Your Eyes Girl" (tease)	I'm Beside You
"Dark Necessities"	The Getaway
"Detroit"	The Getaway
"Dreams of a Samurai"	The Getaway
"Encore"	The Getaway
"Feasting on the Flowers"	The Getaway
"The Getaway"	The Getaway
"Go Robot"	The Getaway
"Goodbye Angels"	The Getaway
"The Longest Wave"	The Getaway
"Sick Love"	The Getaway
"This Ticonderoga"	The Getaway
"We Turn Red"	The Getaway

=== Cover teases (sung/performed by Josh solo unless otherwise noted) ===
Song	Artist
"A Face in the Crowd"	Tom Petty
"Across the Universe"	The Beatles
"Add It Up"	Violent Femmes
"All Night Thing"	Temple of the Dog
"Andy Warhol"	David Bowie
"Angeles"	Elliott Smith
"Answering Machine"	The Replacements
"Anthem"	Leonard Cohen
"Anymore"	Thelonious Monster
"Atomic Dog" (jam – sung by Flea)	George Clinton
"Atmosphere" (no vocals)	Joy Division
"The Ballad of El Goodo"	Big Star
"The Bewlay Brothers"	David Bowie
"Big Rock Candy Mountain" (tease – performed by Flea)	Harry McClintock
"Blackbird"	The Beatles
"Break on Through (To the Other Side)" (full band tease)	The Doors
"Brimful of Asha" (no vocals)	Cornershop
"Bullet Proof" (tease – sung by Flea and Anthony with Chad on drums)	George Clinton
"Burn On"	Randy Newman
"Chelsea Hotel No. 2"	Leonard Cohen
"Close My Eyes" (no vocals)	Arthur Russell
"Cosmic Dancer"	T. Rex
"Cracked Actor" (full band performance)	David Bowie
"The Crunge" (tease – performed by Chad, Flea and Josh)	Led Zeppelin
"Cry Baby Cry"	The Beatles
"D'yer Mak'er" (tease/jam – performed by Chad and Josh)	Led Zeppelin
"Debaser"	Pixies
"Dirty Old Town"	Ewan MacColl
"(Don't Fear) The Reaper" (full band teaser jam)	Blue Öyster Cult
"Don't Dream It's Over"	Crowded House
"Eye of the Tiger" (tease – performed by Chad and Josh)	Survivor
"Family Affair" (tease – sung/performed by Josh, Anthony and Flea)	Sly and the Family Stone
"Field Commander Cohen"	Leonard Cohen
"Five Years"	David Bowie
"Foi Na Cruz"	Nick Cave and the Bad Seeds
"Galveston"	Glen Campbell
"Get It On"	T. Rex
"Green Acres theme" (tease – sung by Flea, performed by Flea/Chad)	Vic Mizzy
"Hands on the Wheel"	Willie Nelson
"Heaven"	Talking Heads
""Heroes""	David Bowie
"Hey Bulldog" (tease – Anthony on bass, Flea on keyboard, Josh on piano)	The Beatles
"Higgs Boson Blues"	Nick Cave and the Bad Seeds
"Hybrid Moments"	Misfits
"I Don't Want to Play in Your Yard"	Peggy Lee
"I Feel You"	Depeche Mode
"I Know It's Gonna Happen Someday"	Morrissey
"I Wanna Be Your Dog" (full band tease)	The Stooges
"I Want to Hold Your Hand" (tease – sung by Josh, performed by band)	The Beatles
"I Would For You"	Jane's Addiction
"If It Be Your Will"	Leonard Cohen
"I'll Be Back"	The Beatles
"I'm on Fire"	Bruce Springsteen
"I'm Set Free"	The Velvet Underground
"I'm So Tired"	The Beatles
"Into My Arms"	Nick Cave
"Io Sono Quel Che Sono"	Mina
"It's So Hard to Say Goodbye to Yesterday"	Boyz II Men
"Jack the Ripper"	Morrissey
"Je suis venu te dire que je m'en vais"	Serge Gainsbourg
"Johnny B. Goode" (full band tease)	Chuck Berry
"The Joker" (tease – sung/performed by Anthony and Chad)	Steve Miller Band
"Ladies' Night" (tease – sung by Flea)	Kool and the Gang
"The Last Day of Our Acquaintance"	Sinéad O'Connor
"Let Me Roll It"	Paul McCartney and Wings
"Living Without You"	Randy Newman
"Lust for Life" (tease – performed by Chad and Josh)	Iggy Pop
"The Mercy Seat"	Nick Cave and the Bad Seeds
"My Death"	Jacques Brel
"Nervous Breakdown" (tease – sung/performed by Flea)	Black Flag
"O Canada" (no vocals)	Calixa Lavallée
"O.D.'d In Denver"	Hank Williams Jr.
"The Only Living Boy in New York"	Simon & Garfunkel
"Opportunity to Cry"	Willie Nelson
"Orange Claw Hammer" (tease – performed by Flea)	Captain Beefheart
"Rain"	The Beatles
"Red Hot Mama" (tease – sung by Flea)	Funkadelic
"Richie Dagger's Crime" (tease – sung/performed by Flea)	Germs
"Rock and Roll" (tease – performed by Chad)	Led Zeppelin
"Seasons"	Chris Cornell
"She's Lost Control" (full band tease/jam)	Joy Division
"Show of Strength" (full band tease)	Echo & the Bunnymen
"So What If I Did"	Thelonious Monster
"Southern Nights"	Glen Campbell
"Spectre"	Radiohead
"Starman" (full band performance)	David Bowie
"Strange Days" (no vocals)	The Doors
"Strangers"	The Kinks
"Sunday Bloody Sunday" (tease – performed by Chad)	U2
"Sway"	The Rolling Stones
"Sweet and Low" (tease – performed by Flea and Josh)	Fugazi
"Sweet Home Alabama" (no vocals)	Lynyrd Skynyrd
"Sycamore Trees"	Jimmy Scott
"That Joke Isn't Funny Anymore"	The Smiths
"That's When I Reach for My Revolver"	Mission of Burma
"This Is a Low"	Blur
"This Is Where I Belong"	The Kinks
"Till There Was You" (tease – sung by Flea)	Meredith Willson
"Tonight" (no vocals)	Iggy Pop
"Try Again"	Big Star
"Twilight"	Elliott Smith
"Two of Us" (full band tease)	The Beatles
"Until the Ocean"	Malfunkshun
"Until Then" (no vocals)	Broadcast
"The Victors" (tease – sung by Chad)	Louis Elbel
"Waiting Room" (tease – performed by Flea, Chad and Josh)	Fugazi
"War Pigs" (tease/jam – performed by Chad and Josh)	Black Sabbath
"Warszawa" (no vocals)	David Bowie
"Watching the Wheels"	John Lennon
"Waterloo Sunset"	The Kinks
"We Will Rock You" (drum jam – performed by Chad and Josh)	Queen
"What Is Soul?" (tease – normally performed following "Californication")	Funkadelic
"Where Everybody Knows Your Name"	Gary Portnoy
"Wichita Lineman"	Glen Campbell
"Wicked Game"	Chris Isaak
"Wild World"	Cat Stevens
"You're a Big Girl Now"	Bob Dylan

- A recording of Eric Dolphy's version of "God Bless the Child" is played prior to the band taking the stage at every show

- The tour also included animated psychedelia visuals by featured animators of Adult Swim's Off the Air because Flea contacted its creator, Dave Hughes to produce such visuals having seen its special "Dan Deacon: When I Was Done Dying" music video. The animators behind the visuals are: Adam Fuchs (Around the World, Give It Away, Otherside), Kokofreakbean (By the Way), Anthony Francisco Schepperd (Give It Away), Hideki Inaba (Dark Necessities, The Getaway), Masanobu Hiraoka (Californication), Emanuele Kabu (Dani California) and Andrew Benson (Nobody Weird Like Me).
- This tour marked the last time that "Mommy, Where's Daddy", "Police Helicopter", "Freaky Styley", "Yertle the Turtle", "Fire", "Higher Ground", "Breaking the Girl", "The Power of Equality", "Aeroplane", "Get on Top", "Dosed", "Brandy (You're a Fine Girl)", "Did I Let You Know", "Ethiopia", "Look Around", "Detroit", "Encore", "Feasting on the Flowers", "The Longest Wave", "This Teconderoga" and "We Turn Red" have been performed live. "The Adventures of Rain Dance Maggie", "Factory of Faith", "Dark Necessities", "Dreams of a Samurai", "Go Robot", "Goodbye Angels", "Sick Love" and "The Getaway" saw their final live performances in 2019 during Klinghoffer's final year of shows with the band.

== Personnel ==
- Flea – bass, backing vocals, keyboards (during jam on 6/10/16)
- Anthony Kiedis – lead vocals, bass (during jam on 6/10/16)
- Josh Klinghoffer – guitar, backing vocals, piano (during jam on 6/10/16)
- Chad Smith – drums, percussion

Additional musicians

- Chris Warren – keyboards, drum synthesizer, percussion
- Nate Walcott – piano, keyboards, trumpet
- Samuel Bañuelos III – second bass (on "Go Robot" and "Encore")

Guest musicians

Guest	Date
George Porter Jr. (The Meters) (bass on "Give it Away")	April 24, 2016
Ziggy Modeliste (The Meters) (drums on "Give it Away")	April 24, 2016
Ivan Neville (Dumpstaphunk) (keyboards on "Give it Away")	April 24, 2016
Taylor Hawkins (Foo Fighters)	April 29, 2016
Stewart Copeland (The Police)	April 29, 2016
Tommy Lee (Mötley Crüe)	April 29, 2016
Mick Fleetwood (Fleetwood Mac)	April 29, 2016
Fred Armisen	April 29, 2016
Josh Freese (Devo)	April 29, 2016
Will Ferrell	April 29, 2016
Thundercat (bass on "Go Robot")	May 26, 2016
Everly Bear Kiedis (vocals on "Dreams of a Samuari")	October 10, 2016
Babymetal (on "Nobody Weird Like Me")	December 14, 2016
George Porter Jr. (The Meters) (bass on "Give it Away")	January 10, 2017
Ivan Neville (Dumpstaphunk) (keyboards on "Give it Away")	January 10, 2017
Trombone Shorty (Trombone Shorty and Orleans Avenue) (trombone on "Give it Away")	January 10, 2017
The Rebirth Brass Band (on "Give it Away")	January 10, 2017
Everly Bear Kiedis (vocals on "Go Robot")	February 12, 2017
Zack Irons (guitar on "Dosed")	May 28, 29, 2017 and October 18, 2017
Jack Irons (drums on "Fire")	June 25, 2017 and October 18, 2017
Mauro Refosco (percussion on "The Adventures of Rain Dance Maggie")	July 20, 2017
Everly Bear Kiedis (vocals on "Goodbye Angels")	July 20 and 27, 2017
Silverlake Conservatory Children's Choir (vocals on "Californication", "Under the Bridge" and "By the Way")	September 9, 2017
Zack Irons (guitar on "The Longest Wave")	October 18, 2017

== Opening acts ==
- Deap Vally (September 1–10, 2016)
- La Femme (October 2016)
- Babymetal (December 5–15, 2016, April 12–29, 2017)
- Trombone Shorty and Orleans Avenue (January 5 – March 18, 2017, October 16, 18, 2017)
- Jack Irons (January 5 – June 30, 2017, July 1, 2017, October 16, 18, 2017)
- IRONTOM (May 11–29, 2017)
- Deerhoof (June 18–25, 2017, June 30 – July 1, 2017)
- KNOWER (July 20–21, 25–27, 2017)
- Lady Leshurr (September 20–21, 2017)
- Louis Cole (October 10–11, 2017)
