= Funky Monks =

Video by Red Hot Chili Peppers
- Released: September 25, 1991
- Recorded: 1991
- Genre: Funk rock
- Length: 60 min.
- Label: Warner Bros.
- Director: Gavin Bowden

Red Hot Chili Peppers chronology
Psychedelic Sexfunk Live from Heaven (1990)	Funky Monks (1991)	* What Hits!? (1992)

Funky Monks is a 1991 documentary (also the title of a song from the 1991 album Blood Sugar Sex Magik) about the rock band Red Hot Chili Peppers and the recording of their highly successful 1991 Warner Bros. debut Blood Sugar Sex Magik. The album was produced by Rick Rubin and recorded in The Mansion, a supposedly haunted house which Rubin now owns. The 60-minute documentary, which was filmed in black-and-white, features footage of the band recording many of the tracks that made the album, and tracks that didn't make the album although would be released as singles and b-sides (such as "Soul to Squeeze", "Sikamikanico" and an Iggy & the Stooges cover "Search And Destroy"). It also features interviews from each member of the band, as well as Rick Rubin and the band's former and longtime manager, Lindy Goetz. Footage from the documentary was compiled for use in the "Suck My Kiss" music video, which was released in 1992. Funky Monks was originally released on VHS but was re-released on DVD. It was filmed and directed by Gavin Bowden.

On July 16, 2011, NME voted Funky Monks the 14th must see rock documentary on their 20 must see rock documentaries list.

The release was certified gold by the RIAA.

== Unreleased version, bonus footage ==
In 2013, a first edit cut of the documentary containing over 18 minutes of footage not included in the released version was released onto YouTube. The newly released footage includes scenes of the band recording "They're Red Hot", "Search and Destroy", "Sikamikanico" and "Soul to Squeeze". Some of the footage is extended from the released version.

It has been widely believed for years a 3-hour cut of the documentary exists. Footage not from the released documentary has been used in other forms of media such as television interviews and documentaries on the band. Rare color footage was also used at the time for various interviews including ones with MTV. A VH-1 documentary contained unseen footage featuring an unreleased song from the Blood Sugar Sex Magik recording sessions that has yet to be identified.
