= Live in Paris (EP) =

Live in Paris EP

EP by Red Hot Chili Peppers
- Released: July 1, 2016
- Recorded: June 14, 2016
- Venue: Canal+ Studios, Paris
- Genre: Funk rock; alternative rock
- Length: 22:25

Red Hot Chili Peppers chronology
The Getaway (2016)	Live in Paris EP (2016)	Unlimited Love (2022)

Live in Paris EP (also known as the Deezer EP) is a live EP by American rock band Red Hot Chili Peppers, released on July 1, 2016 exclusively through the web-based music streaming service Deezer. The songs were recorded on June 14, 2016 at Canal+ studios in Paris during The Getaway World Tour.

== Track listing ==
No.	Title	Writer(s)	Length
1.	"Dark Necessities"	Anthony Kiedis, Flea, Josh Klinghoffer, Chad Smith, Brian Burton	5:06
2.	"Give It Away"	Kiedis, Flea, John Frusciante, Smith	4:55
3.	"By the Way"	Kiedis, Flea, Frusciante, Smith	3:55
4.	"We Turn Red"	Kiedis, Flea, Klinghoffer, Smith, Burton	3:23
5.	"Go Robot"	Kiedis, Flea, Klinghoffer, Smith	4:58
Total length:			22:25

== Personnel ==
Red Hot Chili Peppers

- Anthony Kiedis – lead vocals
- Josh Klinghoffer – guitar, backing vocals
- Flea – bass
- Chad Smith – drums

Additional musicians

- Chris Warren – keyboards, electronic percussion pad
- Nate Walcott - piano, keyboards
