= Go Robot =

Song by the band Red Hot Chili Peppers

Single by Red Hot Chili Peppers

from the album The Getaway
- Released: September 8, 2016
- Genre: Funk rock; disco
- Length: 4:24
- Label: Warner Bros.
- Songwriters: Anthony Kiedis; Flea; Josh Klinghoffer; Chad Smith
- Producer: Danger Mouse

Red Hot Chili Peppers singles chronology
| "Dark Necessities" (2016) | "Go Robot" (2016) | "Sick Love" (2016) |

Music video
- "Go Robot" on YouTube

"Go Robot" is the second single from The Getaway, an album by American rock band Red Hot Chili Peppers. The band's label had originally wanted "Go Robot" to be the album's first single, though they ended up going with "Dark Necessities", which became another chart-topping hit for the band. The music video for the song was released on September 8, 2016.

== Music video ==
A music video directed by Tota Lee was confirmed by Chad Smith to be in production on July 26, 2016. Various teaser clips for the video were released starting on August 29, 2016, with the video being released through the band's Facebook page on September 8, 2016.

The video is heavily inspired by the movie Saturday Night Fever, and was shot along 86th Street in the Italian-American neighborhood of Bensonhurst, Brooklyn in New York City. The band plays various characters imitating the opening scenes of the film. Anthony Kiedis, who portrays the robot (and imitating John Travolta's character), wears nothing but white paint, a bowler hat and a large codpiece. The band ends up at a disco dance contest where Kiedis in robot form interacts with a female robot played by Stephanie Crousillat. Each band member is credited under different names. Kiedis is credited as Cole Dammett, his actual screen name for movies when he was a child, Flea is credited as Michael Peter, his real first and middle names, Chad Smith is credited as Chadwick Gaylord, which are also his first and middle names, and Josh Klinghoffer is credited as J.K. Dashwood. Director Tota Lee is credited in the video as Thoranna Sigurdardottir.

== Record Store Day exclusive ==
"Go Robot"

Single by Red Hot Chili Peppers
- B-side: "Dreams of a Samurai"
- Released: April 22, 2017
- Genre: Funk rock; disco
- Length: 5:02, 7:03
- Label: Warner Bros.
- Songwriters: Anthony Kiedis; Flea; Josh Klinghoffer; Chad Smith

On April 22, 2017 to celebrate Record Store Day, the band released an exclusive 12" version of "Go Robot" / "Dreams of a Samurai" picture disc that is limited to 4,750 copies. Both songs were recorded live during The Getaway World Tour. Each 12" contains a spelling error for "Dreams of a Samurai" with Samurai spelled Sumurai. Warner Bros. offered a corrected version of the 12" to fans that bought the original with the spelling error.

== Live performances ==
"Go Robot" was performed at almost every show on the band's The Getaway World Tour. Though Flea was initially forced to combine both bass parts himself, later dates would feature the song performed live with two basses like the studio track, with the band's assistant tour manager Samuel Bañuelos III providing the slap bass for the song.

A live version recorded in 2016 at Canal+ studios in Paris, can be found on the EP Live in Paris.

== Personnel ==
Red Hot Chili Peppers

- Anthony Kiedis – lead vocals
- Josh Klinghoffer – guitar, keyboard
- Flea – bass guitars
- Chad Smith – drums

Additional musicians

- Brian "Danger Mouse" Burton – synthesizers
- Mauro Refosco – percussion

== Charts ==
=== Weekly charts ===
Weekly chart performance for "Go Robot"
| Chart (2016–2017) | Peak position |
|---|---|
| Canada Rock (Billboard) | 3 |
| Czech Republic Airplay (ČNS IFPI) | 21 |
| Belgium (Ultratip Bubbling Under Flanders) | 14 |
| Belgium (Ultratip Bubbling Under Wallonia) | 36 |
| Finland Airplay (Radiosoittolista) | 29 |
| France (SNEP) | 123 |
| Iceland (RÚV) | 11 |
| US Hot Rock & Alternative Songs (Billboard) | 26 |
| US Rock & Alternative Airplay (Billboard) | 14 |

=== Year-end charts ===
Year-end chart performance for "Go Robot"
| Chart (2017) | Position |
|---|---|
| US Hot Rock Songs (Billboard) | 93 |
| US Rock Airplay (Billboard) | 43 |
