= Sick Love =

Single by Red Hot Chili Peppers

from the album The Getaway
- Released: December 4, 2016
- Genre: Alternative rock; pop rock
- Length: 3:41
- Label: Warner Bros.
- Songwriters: Anthony Kiedis; Flea; Chad Smith; Josh Klinghoffer; Elton John; Bernie Taupin
- Producer: Danger Mouse

Red Hot Chili Peppers singles chronology
"Go Robot" (2016)	"Sick Love" (2016)	"Goodbye Angels" (2017)

Music video
- "Sick Love" on YouTube

"Sick Love" is the third single from The Getaway, an album by the American rock band Red Hot Chili Peppers. Elton John performs on the song which was also co-written by John and longtime collaborator Bernie Taupin.

== Background ==
According to Josh Klinghoffer, "Sick Love" "was a song that we were working on for a while before we started recording it, and it just sounded like Elton John was involved somehow, someway. So we thought we should just invite him down and see if he likes it and wants to play on it." Chad Smith said of the recording "He was kind of nervous. It was actually really kind of cute. When he came in, he looked for somewhere to sit really quick, and he sat down." Anthony Kiedis added "As soon as he touched the piano it was magical. You try not to be a fan boy, but it is Sir Elton John...It’s a real honor for us to have him on the record." The chord structure and melody of the song were inspired by John's song "Bennie and the Jets".

== Music video ==
A music video was confirmed by Chad Smith to be in production on November 13, 2016. The animated video was directed and illustrated by Beth Jeans Houghton and animated by Joseph Brett and Houghton, was released on December 4, 2016. The Adult Swim animation features several references to the Australian model Helena Vestergaard (Anthony Kiedis' former girlfriend) and the relationship between her and the Chili Peppers' vocalist. On the clip, an Australian girl leaves home heading to Hollywood, California, where she finds a vastly different reality than the dreamy scenario commonly portrayed by the media. She then relates with Kiedis and their relationship nuances are literally and metaphorically presented. There are also a few references to Elton John's song "Bennie and the Jets" in the beginning of the music video (on the girl's shirt, TV and on a Music Store in Hollywood).

== Live performances ==
"Sick Love" made its live debut on May 26, 2016 at the band's iHeartRadio album preview show in California.

== Personnel ==
Red Hot Chili Peppers

- Anthony Kiedis – lead vocals
- Josh Klinghoffer – guitar, backing vocals
- Flea – bass
- Chad Smith – drums

Additional musicians

- Elton John – piano
- Mauro Refosco – percussion
- Brian "Danger Mouse" Burton – synthesizers

== Charts ==
Chart (2017)	Peak position
Belgium (Ultratip Bubbling Under Flanders)	28
Switzerland Airplay (Schweizer Hitparade)	84
