= The Getaway (Red Hot Chili Peppers album) =

Studio album by Red Hot Chili Peppers
- Released: June 17, 2016
- Recorded: January–February 2015; October 2015 – March 2016
- Studios: The Sound Factory, Hollywood, California
- Genres: Funk rock; alternative rock; pop rock
- Length: 53:41
- Label: Warner Bros.
- Producer: Danger Mouse

Red Hot Chili Peppers chronology
Cardiff, Wales: 6/23/04 (2015)	The Getaway (2016)	Live in Paris (2016)

Singles from The Getaway
- 1. "Dark Necessities" Released: May 5, 2016; 2. "Go Robot" Released: September 8, 2016; 3. "Sick Love" Released: December 4, 2016; 4. "Goodbye Angels" Released: April 4, 2017

The Getaway is the eleventh studio album by American rock band Red Hot Chili Peppers, released through Warner Bros. on June 17, 2016. It is the band's only studio album since Mother's Milk (1989) to not be produced by Rick Rubin, instead being produced by Danger Mouse, as well as the second and final album with guitarist Josh Klinghoffer. Rubin and guitarist John Frusciante would both return to the band three years later.

The Getaway made its debut at number one in ten countries while reaching number two in the band's home country of the United States, along with the United Kingdom and Canada. The album received generally positive reviews.

The album was preceded by the first single "Dark Necessities" on May 5, 2016. "Go Robot" was released as the album's second single on September 8, 2016, peaking at number 12 on the Alternative Songs Chart, while "Sick Love" was released as the third single on December 4, 2016; however, it failed to chart. "Goodbye Angels" was released as the album's fourth and final single on April 4, 2017. The album's title track received radio airplay in the UK despite never being released as an official single.

== Background ==
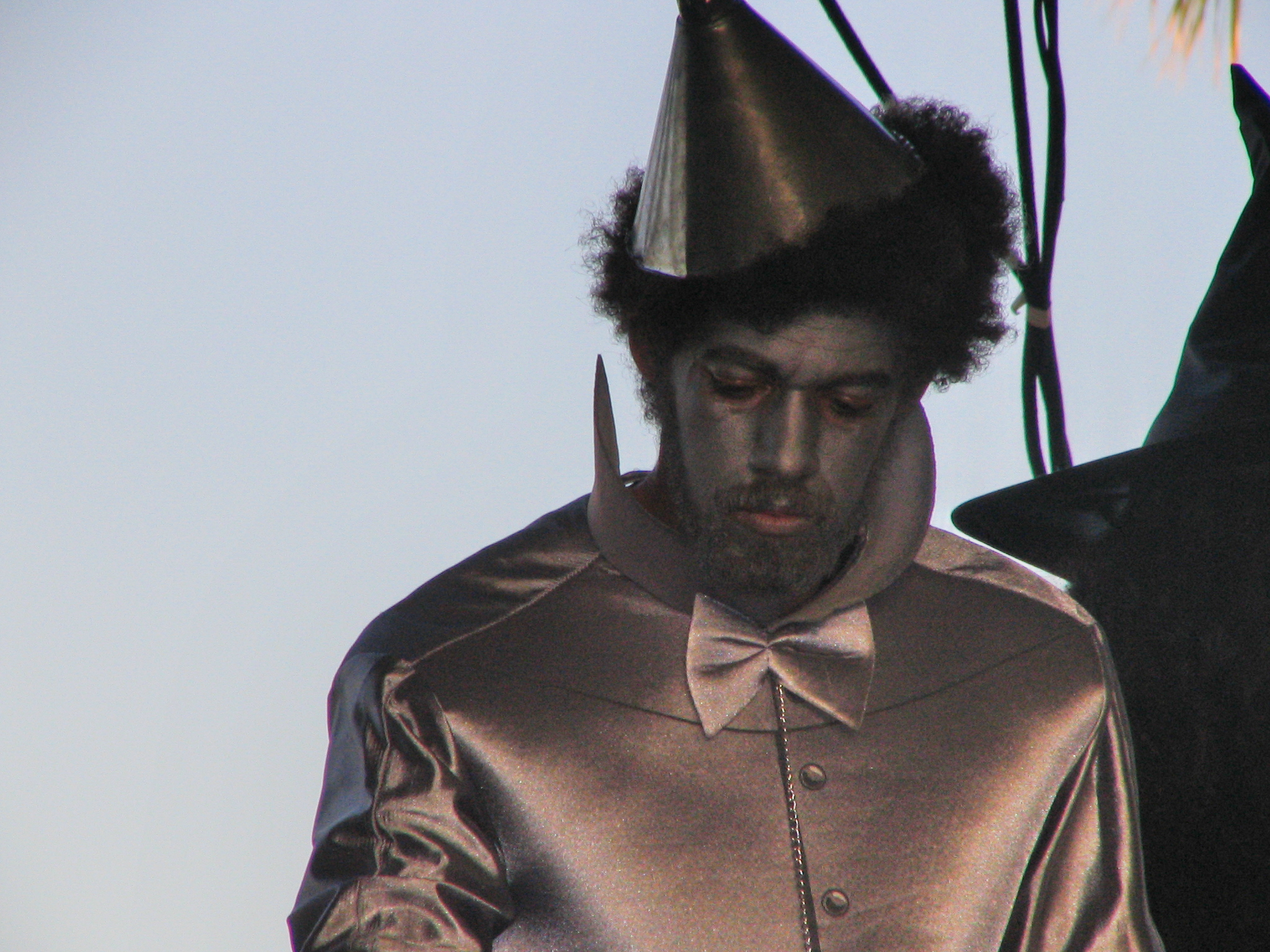
Danger Mouse was recruited to produce The Getaway, after the band previously recorded six studio albums with Rick Rubin.

Production began in 2014, but the project was delayed for eight months due to bassist Flea suffering a broken arm sustained while snowboarding. Vocalist Anthony Kiedis said:

We had an unusually difficult experience making this record, where we wrote 20 to 30 songs and it was all ready to go and we thought it was happening, and then Flea went snowboarding and broke his arm real bad, which was a bit of a setback... So we re-thought everything and then we didn’t have a producer and we were just sort of lost in space with all these songs. And lo and behold it was meant to be, as these things can be, and when all the dust settled Brian Burton, aka Danger Mouse, emerged and said, "Let's go make a record". We were like "Great, we have all these songs" and he was like "Leave those there, let's go write new songs in the studio." Initially there was an affinity and a marriage to all these other songs, but the only way that we saw this working was to have trust in him and get rid of our old ideas and our old way of doing things and say "If this is going to work, we just have to throw ourselves off the cliff and see what happens".

In a May 17, 2016 radio interview, Chad Smith said the band loved Rick Rubin but wanted to change producers and be inspired in a different way this time. Josh Klinghoffer would say in early 2020, after his departure, that creative and personal differences between him and Rick Rubin during the recording of I'm With You led him to choose another producer for The Getaway.

Smith also said "We Turn Red" was one of his favorite songs and that "Go Robot", a funky song he also loves, might be a single. In an interview with Pearl Jam's Mike McCready, recorded late April 2016 and aired on SiriusXM on May 18, 2016, Flea revealed that "Go Robot" was going to be the first single and described the song as a funny, funky, up-tempo jam and inspired by the Prince song "Controversy". In that same interview, Smith said that Josh Klinghoffer plays bass on "The Hunter" and that it was the only song on the album that Flea did not play on. Smith described Klinghoffer's playing as sounding like Paul McCartney.

The band confirmed during an album preview show on May 26, 2016, that the previously reported information of Elton John appearing on the album was true and that he plays piano on "Sick Love". John and longtime collaborator Bernie Taupin have a writing credit on the song. Anna Waronker, best known as the singer of That Dog, provides vocals on "The Getaway". In a June 7, 2016 interview, Kiedis said that Danger Mouse was the reason "Dark Necessities" became the first single. The band had pushed for "The Getaway" to be the first single while management and the record label wanted "Go Robot". "Encore" originally started out as an instrumental jam and was performed for the first time on the I'm With You Tour.

Kiedis, in a May 9, 2016 interview on BBC Radio 2, said that lyrically many of the songs were influenced by a two-year relationship "that completely fell apart like a nuclear bomb," and that his favorite song is "The Getaway".

Some of the songs were known by alternate/working titles during the recording/writing process: The Philippines ("The Longest Wave"), Robot Man ("Go Robot"), Mystery ("This Ticonderoga"), Night of the Hunter ("The Hunter") and On the Bright Side ("Kaly").

== Packaging ==
The album cover is a painting by Kevin Peterson. According to Peterson, "The Red Hot Chili Peppers wanted to use my painting Coalition II for the cover of their upcoming album. I told em it was cool but not to hound me for autographs. Special thanks to Chloe and @Chelsea Marie Bradley for some fine modeling." Anthony Kiedis in an interview on the Kevin and Bean show on May 5, 2016, discussed the album cover, saying, "Normally we get a little more high brow artsy, and this just felt extremely warm and human, even though it’s animals, it felt human. And it’s also us. Chad is the bear, Josh is the girl and Flea is the raccoon and me as the funny little raven out front."

== Outtakes and unreleased songs ==
"Kaly" and "Outer Space" were recorded during The Getaway sessions, according to Klinghoffer. These songs did not make the final cut for the album and were never released by the band. On March 16, 2022, "Kaly" and "Outer Space" leaked to YouTube.

During the band's 2014 demo sessions for The Getaway, the band recorded demos of the songs "Drastic" and "Nowhere I Am". Neither was ever released by the band. "Nowhere I Am" was re-recorded by Klinghoffer under the pseudonym of Pluralone and released as a B-side in 2019. Another unreleased song that was originally recorded for The Getaway was "Obscene". This was also never released by the band, but was re-recorded, and appears on Pluralone's 2019 album, To Be One with You. "Was Never There" was demoed by the band in 2012. It is unknown if it was ever intended to appear on The Getaway. The song was also re-recorded by Klinghoffer for Pluralone's 2019 album, and featured Flea and founding Red Hot Chili Peppers drummer Jack Irons.

== Promotion ==
The band performed an album preview show on May 26, 2016. Four songs from the album were performed. iHeartRadio aired the show online on June 17, 2016, the day The Getaway was released. A music video for "Dark Necessities" was filmed with Olivia Wilde as the director and was released on June 16, 2016.

On May 26, 2016, the band released the title track on their YouTube channel and on June 9, 2016, released "We Turn Red". While not singles, the two songs were made available to purchase the following day after their release along with as a free downloads for those who pre-order the new album.

On June 9, 2016, it was announced that fans in New York City and Los Angeles could enter to win an invitation to an exclusive private listening party of The Getaway on June 13, 2016. Fans in other countries such as Brazil and Argentina (June 14), Italy and Thailand (June 15) and Mexico (June 16) also had a chance to attend at private listening parties.

The band appeared on the June 14, 2016 episode of The Late Late Show with James Corden for the pre-taped segment of Carpool Karaoke where they drove around Los Angeles singing their own songs in a karaoke style with the host. During the filming of the segment, Kiedis saved a baby's life. Kiedis told Chris Moyles on UK radio station Radio X: "We had a very interesting unscripted moment. We danced-off, we tied and then we were going to celebrate with some Mexican food on the corner. And a woman came out of her house, holding a child saying, 'My baby, my baby, my baby can't breathe!' We all ran across the street, the woman thrust the baby into my arms, the baby was not breathing. I thought, 'I'm gonna try and do a little baby CPR real quick, see if I can get some air in this kid.' I tried to open the mouth, [it was] locked shut. So I started rubbing the belly, bubbles came out of the mouth, the eyes rolled back into place, the ambulance showed up, and I handed the baby over, who was now breathing and fine. Then we went back to shooting Carpool Karaoke."

On June 15, 2016, Sirius XM Radio channel Lithium became Red Hot Chili Peppers Radio until June 22, 2016. The channel played music spanning the band's entire career with exclusive commentary on writing, recording and performing live. Also songs from influential artists hand-picked from the band's personal music collection were played. Chris Rock, a longtime friend and fan of the band, hosted the limited-run channel.

"Go Robot" was released as the album's second single. A music video directed by Tota Lee was confirmed to be in production on July 26, 2016 A teaser clip for the video was released on August 29, 2016. The video was released on September 8, 2016.

"Sick Love" was released as the third single on December 4, 2016. The animated music video was directed and illustrated by Kiedis' ex-girlfriend Beth Jeans Houghton.

"Goodbye Angels" was released as the fourth single on April 4, 2017. The band shot a music video for the song at their show in Atlanta on April 14, 2017.

== Tour ==
The world tour to support the album began in June 2016 in Europe with a festival tour. The band's headlining tour to support the album will begin in September 2016 in Europe and continue into 2017 throughout the United States and Canada. "Dark Necessities", "Go Robot", "Sick Love" and "This Ticonderoga" made their live debuts in May 2016. "The Getaway" had actually been teased during their performances of "Give It Away" at Ace Hotel for the Feel The Bern Benefit Concert in Los Angeles, CA on February 5, 2016, and at Super Bowl 50 party in San Francisco, CA back in February 2016; however, it went unknown until the band released the song on May 26, 2016. The song was first performed in its entirety on May 29, 2016. "We Turn Red" became the sixth song from the album to be performed live, making its debut on June 10, 2016, at the Pinkpop festival. "The Longest Wave" made its live debut on June 14, 2016, at a promotional show in Paris. "Detroit" made its live debut on June 29, 2016, at the Roskilde Festival. On July 1, 2016, the Live In Paris EP was released exclusively through the music streaming website Deezer. It features five songs from the band's performance of June 14, 2016 in Paris. "Goodbye Angels" made its live debut on July 10, 2016. "Dreams of a Samurai" made its live debut on July 24, 2016, at the Fuji Rock Festival in Japan. "Feasting on the Flowers" premiered in Oslo, Norway on September 8, 2016."Encore" was finally performed on April 24, 2017, in Jacksonville, FL making "The Hunter" the only song to not be performed yet from the album. The tour concluded on October 18, 2017, lasting a year and almost five months and consisted of 151 shows. The tour placed 32nd on Pollstar's year-end top 100 worldwide tours list for 2016, grossing a total of $46.2 million, and it finished as the 18th highest grossing worldwide tour in 2017 grossing $73.5 million.

== Critical reception ==
Professional ratings
Aggregate scores
Source	Rating
AnyDecentMusic?	6.3/10
Metacritic	66/100
Review scores
Source	Rating
AllMusic	3/5 stars
Clash	8/10
Classic Rock	4/5 stars
Consequence of Sound	C+
The Independent	4/5 stars
The Guardian	3/5 stars
NME	3/5 stars
Pitchfork	5.4/10
Rock Sound	6/10
Rolling Stone	3.5/5 stars

At Metacritic, which assigns a normalized rating out of 100 to reviews from mainstream critics, the album has received an average score of 66, based on 25 reviews, which indicates "generally favourable reviews". Nate Chinen of The New York Times gave the album a positive review, stating, "It doesn’t sound exactly like classic-vintage Chili Peppers, but it might just sound like how you remember them." He said, "Danger Mouse takes a Rubinesque approach, smartly punching up the sinewy cohesion that still sets the Chili Peppers apart", while adding that guitarist Josh Klinghoffer "sounds fully vested now". Andy Gill of The Independent gave the album 4 out 5 saying "As ever, California gets plenty of mentions, though there’s less filler than usual, the album reaching a yearning epiphany in the string-draped song for a son, 'The Hunter'." Simon Harper of Clash magazine gave the album an 8 out of 10, calling The Getaway a "subtle, intimate, and expressive album." He praised the focus and restraint shown in the album saying the "focus on delicate and melodic dynamics throughout suggests a more profound exploration of their sound beyond each musician’s virtuoso abilities." He closed the review stating "The brilliance of The Getaway is in its subtleties, which define their most intimate and expressive album to date, and suggest that, after 32 years, the Chilis can still keep us guessing." David Stubbs of Classic Rock magazine gave the album 4 stars out of 5, praising the band's "expertise and the masterly stitching qualities of Danger Mouse" and calling the album "a tightly woven affair, never messy or maudlin, or self-indulgent; a dreamcoat of many colours, a marble rye of genres."

Glenn Gamboa of Newsday gave the album a very positive review and score of A−, saying "the Red Hot Chili Peppers sound energized and adventurous" and that "Josh Klinghoffer comes into his own as the band's guitarist." He ended by saying "The Getaway funnels the wildness of Mother's Milk and the ambitions of Stadium Arcadium into the Peppers' most focused — and artistically consistent — album yet." Darryl Sterdan of Toronto Sun gave the album a positive review saying "The Getaway is an exercise in finesse and nuance. The beats are more straightforward and flowing. The arrangements are simpler and airier... Everything from electronic squiggles and strings to ringing bells and handclaps mark this as one of the group's most sonically diverse outings." Will Hermes of the Rolling Stone gave the album 3 1/2 stars out of 5, saying "...the Peppers' 11th LP is a bold attempt to jibe their past party-dog selves with their present-day artistic ambitions – not always a perfect fit but a compelling one." Matt Collar of AllMusic gave the album 3 1/2 stars out of 5, saying "The Getaway is a sophisticated work of dark-hued maturity that finds the long-running California outfit expanding their sound into nuanced, '70s-style orchestral soul and funky psychedelia". He also noted that "sonically it feels as if the band and Klinghoffer have finally gelled as a complete creative unit." He praised the "80's electro-infused 'Go Robot'", "athletic funk punk jam" "This Ticonderoga", as well as "The Longest Wave" and "Feasting on the Flowers" for their "melodic, psychedelic quality that feels inspired by the Beatles' late-'60s period". He concluded the review by saying "The Getaway is a nuanced album, rife with journeyman craft and poetry, that proves the Red Hot Chili Peppers still have plenty of their own creative fire."

Patrick Ryan of USA Today gave the album a positive review, and praised the band for "their semi-reinvention". He called "Sick Love", "Go Robot", and "Detroit" highlights of the album, and concluded "The Getaway proves not only that the longtime rockers still sizzle 30 years in, but also are capable of victoriously revamping their sound." Chad Childers of Loudwire gave the album a positive review, praising the band for "experimenting with more sounds in the musical palette... 'Sick Love' and 'Feasting on the Flowers' thrive in parts when the keys and or piano take over." Arka Sengupta of the International Business Times gave the album a mostly positive review, saying "Klinghoffer has found his foothold in the band's sound with this album." But he noted "The album seems to be created with a calculated approach and with a commercial viability in mind", adding that "Even though that tarnishes the album's artistic flair a bit, its overall appeal is not reduced." Steve Keros of Entertainment Weekly gave the album a B, saying "The Chili Peppers have taken a chill pill... ambiance is in abundance". He praised the "upbeat" and "Prince-inspired" "Go Robot", as well the "downright dreamy" "The Longest Wave". He concluded that "the band can't help but sound like themselves... it's the ultimate sign of their staying power".

Alex Flood of New Musical Express gave the album 3 stars out of 5 in a somewhat mixed review, saying "The problems come when they slip into habit... Flea's bass solos still sound like the theme tune from Seinfeld, and Anthony Kiedis often spouts nonsense." But he praised tracks such as "Dark Necessities" and "Go Robot", as well as "Dreams of a Samurai", by saying it "takes their sound in a new and exciting direction." He concluded that "...these are well penned tunes. They just don't do anything special with them." Exclaim!'s Alex Hudson credited the band's "dabbling in new sounds" but criticized the album's lack of singles, rating the album a 6/10. Harriet Gibsone of The Guardian gave the album 3 stars out of 5 in a mixed review. She noted that "Josh Klinghoffer's style brings out a spacier, melancholy feel that mutes the burliness of previous records", and that ""The Longest Wave" is delicate in its downcast approach... That said, clunky metaphors and couplets all too often come along and puncture the pensiveness." Consequence of Sound's Dan Caffrey gave the album a C+ in a mixed review saying the album is "haunted by Danger Mouse production that recalls the more nocturnal side of L.A...it’s the least the Red Hot Chili Peppers have sounded like the Red Hot Chili Peppers..." He added that "The Getaway starts to flounder whenever they revert back to old habits." Dan Bogosian of the A.V. Club gave the album a mixed review and C+. He called "Sick Love" "the biggest treat of the album" and said it "gives the Chili Peppers more of an appeal than they've had in years." He criticized the album's lyrics by saying "Kiedis is still more likely to rap about his sexual harassment days than anything profoundly meaningful", while adding "The strengths remain in the three musicians behind him; the weaknesses play no more of a role than they always have."

Zoe Camp of Pitchfork gave the album a 5.4 out of 10 in a mixed review. She said, "The Getaway easily stands as the Peppers' lushest album to date... their sonic tropes haven't changed"; however, she noted that "Burton's foggy, psychedelic palette marks a drastic shift in the presentation of those motifs, widening the gulf between the band's funk-metal past and their hang-loose, jam-band present." She criticized the album's lyrics, saying, "By now, Peppers fans know better than to expect Pulitzer-worthy poetry from a goofy bard like Kiedis... the album’s lyrical stasis scans as disappointing, if unsurprising." She concluded that "Were it not for these issues...The Getaway could have potentially bested By the Way as the Peppers' best work post-Californication." In a mostly negative review, Lauren Murphy of The Irish Times gave the album 2 stars out of 5. She said, "...it sounds like a Red Hot Chili Peppers album, with the customary taut shuck of guitars, ostentatious basslines a-plenty, and Kiedis's spitfire vocals...The vibrant 'Feasting on the Flowers' is better, changing the lazy formula that permeates the track listing, but overall a vague sense of ridiculousness is never far away."

== Commercial performance ==
The album was a commercial success, debuting at number one in several countries, including Australia, Austria, Belgium (Flanders), Belgium (Wallonia), Ireland, Italy, New Zealand, the Netherlands, and Switzerland. It also achieved top-ten debuts in Canada, Denmark, Finland, France, Germany, Greece, Hungary, Norway, Poland, Portugal, Sweden, the United Kingdom, and the United States.

In its home country of United States, The Getaway debuted at number two on the Billboard 200, with 118,000 equivalent album units, behind Drake's Views. The Getaway was the number one album in Overall Album Sales, Digital Album Sales, Rock Albums and Alternative Albums in its debut in the United States. It marked the group's seventh straight album to make its debut within the top four positions on the chart in the past 25 years dating back to 1991's Blood Sugar Sex Magik. In its second week, The Getaway fell to number nine on the Billboard 200, earning 28,000 units (down 76 percent).

In the United Kingdom, the album debuted at number two on the UK Albums Chart selling 40,000, behind Radiohead's A Moon Shaped Pool.

As of September 29, 2021, The Getaway has sold more than 500,000 units in the United States and is certified Gold.

== Track listing ==
All tracks are written by Anthony Kiedis, Flea, Josh Klinghoffer and Chad Smith, except where noted.

The Getaway track listing
No.	Title	Writer(s)	Length
1.	"The Getaway"	Kiedis; Flea; Klinghoffer; Smith; Brian Burton	4:10
2.	"Dark Necessities"	Kiedis; Flea; Klinghoffer; Smith; Burton	5:02
3.	"We Turn Red"	Kiedis; Flea; Klinghoffer; Smith; Burton	3:20
4.	"The Longest Wave"		3:31
5.	"Goodbye Angels"		4:28
6.	"Sick Love"	Kiedis; Flea; Klinghoffer; Smith; Elton John; Bernie Taupin	3:41
7.	"Go Robot"		4:23
8.	"Feasting on the Flowers"	Kiedis; Flea; Klinghoffer; Smith; Burton	3:22
9.	"Detroit"		3:46
10.	"This Ticonderoga"		3:35
11.	"Encore"		4:14
12.	"The Hunter"	Kiedis; Flea; Klinghoffer; Smith; Burton	4:00
13.	"Dreams of a Samurai"		6:09
Total length:			53:41

== Personnel ==
Red Hot Chili Peppers

- Anthony Kiedis – lead vocals
- Josh Klinghoffer – guitars, backing vocals, bass guitar (track 12), piano (tracks 4, 8, 10, 11, 13)
- Flea – bass (tracks 1–11, 13), piano (tracks 2 and 12), trumpet (track 12)
- Chad Smith – drums

Design

- Red Hot Chili Peppers – art direction
- Kevin Peterson – cover artwork
- Alex Tenta – design and layout
- Steve Keros – photos

Additional musicians

- Brian "Danger Mouse" Burton – Mellotron (track 3), organ (track 8), synthesizers (tracks 1, 5–7, and 13)
- Elton John – piano (track 6)
- Mauro Refosco – percussion (tracks 6 and 7)
- Anna Waronker – additional vocals (track 1)
- Beverley Chitwood – vocal solo (track 13)
- Daniele Luppi – string arrangements and conduction
- Peter Kent – 1st violin (tracks 2, 4, 11 and 12)
- Sharon Jackson – 2nd violin (tracks 2, 4, 11 and 12)
- Briana Bandy – viola (tracks 2, 4, 11 and 12)
- Armen Ksajikian – cello (tracks 2, 4, 11 and 12)
- SJ Hasman – choir (tracks 5, 12–13)
- Beverley Chitwood – choir (tracks 5, 12–13)
- Alexx Daye – choir (tracks 5, 12–13)
- David Loucks – choir (tracks 5, 12–13)
- Kennya Ramsey – choir (tracks 5, 12–13)
- Matthew Selby – choir (tracks 5, 12–13)
- Loren Smith – choir (tracks 5, 12–13)
- Gregory Whipple – choir (tracks 5, 12–13)

Production

- Danger Mouse – production
- Nigel Godrich – mixing engineer and additional programming (Conway Recording Studios in Hollywood, California)
- Kennie Takahasi – recording
- Todd Monfalcone – assistant engineering
- Samuel Petts-Davies – mix engineering
- John Armstrong – mix assistant
- Stephen Marcussen – mastering
- Andrew Scheps – pre-production engineers (The Boat Studio in Los Angeles and Greenwater in Malibu, California)
- Chris Warren – pre-production engineers (The Boat Studio and Greenwater)
- Greg Fidelman – pre-production engineers (The Boat Studio and Greenwater)

== Charts ==
=== Weekly charts ===
2016 weekly chart performance for The Getaway
Chart (2016)	Peak position
Australian Albums (ARIA)	1
Austrian Albums (Ö3 Austria)	1
Belgian Albums (Ultratop Flanders)	1
Belgian Albums (Ultratop Wallonia)	1
Canadian Albums (Billboard)	2
Croatian International Albums (HDU)	1
Czech Albums (ČNS IFPI)	1
Danish Albums (Hitlisten)	6
Dutch Albums (Album Top 100)	1
Finnish Albums (Suomen virallinen lista)	2
French Albums (SNEP)	3
German Albums (Offizielle Top 100)	2
Greek Albums (IFPI Greece)	8
Hungarian Albums (MAHASZ)	1
Irish Albums (IRMA)	1
Italian Albums (FIMI)	1
Japan Hot Albums (Billboard Japan)	3
Japanese Albums (Oricon)	4
New Zealand Albums (RMNZ)	1
Norwegian Albums (VG-lista)	4
Polish Albums (ZPAV)	2
Portuguese Albums (AFP)	2
South Korean Albums (Circle)	32
South Korean International Albums (Circle)	5
Scottish Albums (Official Charts)	2
Spanish Albums (Promusicae)	3
Swedish Albums (Sverigetopplistan)	4
Swiss Albums (Romandie)	1
Swiss Albums (Schweizer Hitparade)	1
Taiwanese Albums (Five Music)	4
UK Albums (Official Charts)	2
US Billboard 200	2
US Top Alternative Albums (Billboard)	1
US Top Rock Albums (Billboard)	1
US Indie Store Album Sales (Billboard)	2

=== Year-end charts ===
2016 year-end chart performance for The Getaway
Chart (2016)	Position
Australian Albums (ARIA)	34
Austrian Albums (Ö3 Austria)	45
Belgian Albums (Ultratop Flanders)	28
Belgian Albums (Ultratop Wallonia)	36
Dutch Albums (Album Top 100)	21
French Albums (SNEP)	79
German Albums (Offizielle Top 100)	30
Hungarian Albums (MAHASZ)	10
Italian Albums (FIMI)	36
Japan Hot Albums (Billboard Japan)	89
Japanese Albums (Oricon)	50
New Zealand Albums (RMNZ)	22
Polish Albums (ZPAV)	62
South Korean International Albums (Gaon)	47
Spanish Albums (PROMUSICAE)	97
Swiss Albums (Schweizer Hitparade)	13
UK Albums (OCC)	54
US Alternative Albums (Billboard)	9
US Billboard 200	77
US Top Rock Albums (Billboard)	10

2017 year-end chart performance for The Getaway
Chart (2017)	Position
Belgian Albums (Ultratop Flanders)	174
Polish Albums (ZPAV)	42
US Alternative Albums (Billboard)	21
US Top Rock Albums (Billboard)	36

== Certifications and sales ==
Certifications for The Getaway
Region	Certification	Certified units/sales
Austria (IFPI Austria)	Gold	7,500^{*}
Canada (Music Canada)	Gold	40,000^{^}
Denmark (IFPI Danmark)	Gold	10,000^{‡}
France (SNEP)	Platinum	100,000^{‡}
Germany (BVMI)	Gold	100,000^{‡}
Hungary (MAHASZ)	Platinum	2,000^{^}
Italy (FIMI)	Platinum	50,000^{‡}
Japan (RIAJ)	Gold	100,000^{^}
Netherlands (NVPI)	Gold	20,000^{‡}
New Zealand (RMNZ)	Platinum	15,000^{‡}
Poland (ZPAV)	Platinum	20,000^{‡}
Switzerland (IFPI Switzerland)	Gold	10,000^{^}
United Kingdom (BPI)	Gold	100,000^{‡}
United States (RIAA)	Gold	500,000^{‡}
Summaries
Worldwide	—	1,000,000
^{*} Sales figures based on certification alone.^{^} Shipments figures based on certification alone.^{‡} Sales+streaming figures based on certification alone.
