= Lindy Goetz =

American music manager

Lindy David Goetz (born December 5, 1947) is notable as the longtime manager of the Red Hot Chili Peppers.

== History ==
Lindy Goetz was a promotion person for record companies, who later became a talent manager in the Los Angeles area. In 1972, Goetz, then a promotion person at MCA Records, was instrumental in forming the Stone Canyon Band for Ricky Nelson, within days after Nelson's original band members had resigned. Goetz had also managed the Ohio Players, during his time as a promotion person with Mercury Records.

As an existing talent manager in the Los Angeles area, Goetz first heard the Red Hot Chili Peppers in 1983, playing at the Kit Kat Club, a burlesque bar owned by Eddie Nash. Band members Anthony Kiedis and Flea thereafter visited Goetz' offices and proposed that he manage the group, which he agreed to do. Goetz thereafter negotiated a seven-album contract for the band with EMI Records. Goetz was also instrumental in negotiations when the band wished to change record labels, ultimately moving to Warner Bros. Records in 1990. Goetz remained as manager of the band until 1998, when he chose to leave music management and retire to Ojai, California. His consistent loyalty to the band is considered to have been instrumental to its success.

In 1995, Goetz was the executive producer of Working Class Hero: A Tribute to John Lennon, featuring various Alternative rock and mainstream rock acts performing Lennon songs.
