= Dark Necessities =

2016 single by Red Hot Chili Peppers

Single by Red Hot Chili Peppers

from the album The Getaway
- Released: May 5, 2016
- Genre: Alternative rock; funk rock
- Length: 5:02
- Label: Warner Bros.
- Songwriters: Red Hot Chili Peppers; Danger Mouse
- Producer: Danger Mouse

Red Hot Chili Peppers singles chronology
"Brendan's Death Song" (2012)	"Dark Necessities" (2016)	"Go Robot" (2016)

Music video
- "Dark Necessities" on YouTube

"Dark Necessities" is a song by American rock band Red Hot Chili Peppers and is the first single from their eleventh studio album, The Getaway. The single was released on May 5, 2016. The music video was released on June 16, 2016. The song was released as a limited edition cassette single that was included in a deluxe package of The Getaway available only through the band's website.

"Dark Necessities" was successful on the Billboard charts, becoming the band's 13th number-one single and 25th top ten single on the Alternative Songs chart, both of which are records for any artist. The song is also the fourth song ever to reach number one on the Alternative Songs chart, the Mainstream Rock chart, and the Adult Alternative Songs chart.

"Dark Necessities" made its live debut on May 22, 2016, at the Rock on the Range festival in Columbus, Ohio.

A live version recorded at Canal+ Studios in Paris, is on the Live in Paris EP.

== Background ==
In a June 7, 2016, video interview for the band's YouTube channel, Anthony Kiedis discussed the song saying that many of the songs were created on their own. However, "Dark Necessities" was one of the songs that the band had written with Brian Burton aka Danger Mouse. Kiedis said that he went to Hawaii and worked on the lyrics to the song, which "speaks to the beauty of our dark sides and how much creativity and growth and light actually comes out of those difficult struggles that we have on the inside of our heads that no one else can see." Kiedis also said that the song meant a lot to Burton and it was one of his favorites. He said that Burton fought for "Dark Necessities" to be the first single. However, the band wanted "The Getaway" to be the first single while the label and managers wanted the song "Go Robot" to be the first single.

== Critical reception ==
"Dark Necessities" was placed at number 12 on Rolling Stone’s "50 Best Songs of 2016" list, writing: “Their big comeback hit collabo with Danger Mouse, with Anthony Kiedis getting personal about his darkest, druggiest memories over a Flea bassline full of blood, sugar, sex and magic.”

== Music video ==
The video, directed by Olivia Wilde, was released through the band's Facebook page on June 16, 2016. Chris Blauvelt served as the cinematographer. The music video features long boarders (Carmen Shafer, Amanda Caloia, Amanda Powell, and Noelle Mulligan) skating around a grocery store, abandoned streets, and the Los Angeles River, interspersed with the band playing the song.

== Personnel ==
Red Hot Chili Peppers

- Anthony Kiedis – lead vocals
- Flea – bass guitar, piano
- Chad Smith – drums, percussion
- Josh Klinghoffer – guitars, backing vocals

Additional musicians

- Daniele Luppi – string arrangement
- Peter Kent – violin
- Sharon Jackson – violin
- Briana Bandy – viola
- Armen Ksajikian – cello

== Charts ==
=== Weekly charts ===
Weekly chart performance for "Dark Necessities"
Chart (2016)	Peak position
Argentina Airplay (Monitor Latino)	5
Australia (ARIA)	52
Austria (Ö3 Austria Top 40)	48
Belgium (Ultratop 50 Flanders)	18
Belgium (Ultratip Bubbling Under Wallonia)	5
Canada Hot 100 (Billboard)	51
Canada Rock (Billboard)	1
Finland Airplay (Radiosoittolista)	13
France (SNEP)	45
Czech Republic Singles Digital (ČNS IFPI)	52
Czech Republic Airplay (ČNS IFPI)	6
Germany (GfK)	47
Hungary (Single Top 40)	19
Iceland (RÚV)	6
Ireland (IRMA)	67
Israel International Airplay (Media Forest)	2
Italy (FIMI)	54
Japan Hot 100 (Billboard)	47
Lebanon (Lebanese Top 20)	15
Netherlands (Single Top 100)	60
New Zealand Heatseekers (Recorded Music NZ)	1
Poland Airplay (ZPAV)	80
Portugal (AFP)	43
Scotland Singles (OCC)	55
Slovenia Airplay (SloTop50)	26
Sweden Heatseeker (Sverigetopplistan)	17
Switzerland (Schweizer Hitparade)	39
UK Singles (OCC)	72
US Billboard Hot 100	67
US Hot Rock & Alternative Songs (Billboard)	6
US Rock & Alternative Airplay (Billboard)	1

=== Year-end charts ===
Year-end chart performance for "Dark Necessities"
Chart (2016)	Position
Argentina (Monitor Latino)	21
Belgium (Ultratop Flanders)	62
US Hot Rock Songs (Billboard)	15
US Rock Airplay (Billboard)	3

== Certifications ==
Certifications and sales for "Dark Necessities"
Region	Certification	Certified units/sales
Canada (Music Canada)	Gold	40,000^{‡}
Denmark (IFPI Danmark)	Gold	45,000^{‡}
France (SNEP)	Gold	100,000^{‡}
Germany (BVMI)	Gold	200,000^{‡}
Italy (FIMI)	Platinum	50,000^{‡}
Poland (ZPAV)	Platinum	50,000^{‡}
Portugal (AFP)	Gold	5,000^{‡}
Spain (Promusicae)	Gold	30,000^{‡}
United Kingdom (BPI)	Platinum	600,000^{‡}
United States (RIAA)	Platinum	1,000,000^{‡}
^{‡} Sales+streaming figures based on certification alone.
