= Goodbye Angels =

Single by Red Hot Chili Peppers

from the album The Getaway
- Released: April 4, 2017
- Recorded: 2015–2016
- Genre: Funk rock; alternative rock; progressive rock
- Length: 4:29
- Label: Warner Bros.
- Songwriters: Anthony Kiedis; Flea; Josh Klinghoffer; Chad Smith
- Producer: Danger Mouse

Red Hot Chili Peppers singles chronology
"Sick Love" (2016)	"Goodbye Angels" (2017)	"Black Summer" (2022)

Music video
- "Goodbye Angels" on YouTube

"Goodbye Angels" is the fourth single from The Getaway (2016), an album by the American rock band Red Hot Chili Peppers. The song was released to radio on April 4, 2017. This would be the final single the band would release with guitarist Josh Klinghoffer, as previous guitarist John Frusciante returned to the band in 2019.

== Music video ==
On April 14, 2017, Chad Smith announced on Twitter that the band would be shooting the video for the song that night at their show in Atlanta, and for fans to "wear something colorful". The video for Goodbye Angels was released on May 9, 2017, and is directed by Thoranna Sigurdardottir also known as TOTA and stars Klara Kristin.

The video switches between a storyline following a girl's night and live footage of the band. Initially, the girl is partying with friends in a parking lot, and soon she has to outrun a security guard and she steals a bike to pedal to a show. When she arrives, she steals someone's beer, and encounters Anthony Kiedis, Chad Smith, and Flea backstage. She briefly makes out with another woman in a toilet to get a pill from her pocket, then watches the rest of the show. By the end, she finds herself crying alone as crew members clear the empty arena.

== Live performances ==
"Goodbye Angels" was first performed live in July 2016 at the band's T in the Park headlining set in Scotland.

== In other media ==
"Goodbye Angels" was featured in advertisements for the second season of the television series Animal Kingdom.

== Personnel ==
Red Hot Chili Peppers

- Anthony Kiedis – lead vocals
- Josh Klinghoffer – guitar, backing vocals
- Flea – bass
- Chad Smith – drums, percussion

Additional musicians

- Brian "Danger Mouse" Burton – synthesizers
- Beverley Chitwood – choir
- Alexx Daye – choir
- David Loucks – choir
- Kennya Ramsey – choir
- Matthew Selby – choir
- SJ Hasman – choir
- Loren Smith – choir
- Gregory Whipple – choir

== Charts ==
Chart (2017)	Peak position
US Alternative Airplay (Billboard)	25
