= Red Hot Chili Peppers: Live from the Basement =

Live album by Red Hot Chili Peppers
- Released: December 30, 2012
- Recorded: 2012
- Genre: Alternative rock, funk rock
- Length: 60 minutes
- Producer: Nigel Godrich

Red Hot Chili Peppers chronology
Red Hot Chili Peppers Live: I'm with You (2011)	Red Hot Chili Peppers: Live from the Basement (2012)

Live releases chronology
Red Hot Chili Peppers Live: I'm with You (2011)	Red Hot Chili Peppers: Live From the Basement (2012)

Red Hot Chili Peppers: Live from the Basement is the title of 2012 live performance by Red Hot Chili Peppers which was part of Nigel Godrich's online live music series, From the Basement. Filmed in 2012, the performance featured the band performing most of their 2011 album, I'm with You in sequence, in its entirety. The performance has since been aired on television in various parts of the world including the United States (VH-1 Classic) and the UK however never released on DVD.

== Songs performed ==
When first announced, drummer Chad Smith hinted at the entire album being performed including "Even You Brutus", the only track from the album that has never been performed live. However, only nine of the album's fourteen tracks appeared in hour long performance. It is still unknown if the entire album, including "Even You Brutus" was performed and if so, why it has never been released. At the time of filming, guitarist Josh Klinghoffer was suffering from a broken foot so he was seated during the performance.

All songs written by Flea, Kiedis, Klinghoffer, Smith.

1. "Monarchy of Roses
2. "Factory of Faith"
3. "Ethiopia"
4. "Look Around"
5. "The Adventures of Rain Dance Maggie"
6. "Did I Let You Know"
7. "Goodbye Hooray"
8. "Police Station"
9. "Meet Me At the Corner"

== Personnel ==
- Flea – bass, piano, backing vocals
- Anthony Kiedis – lead vocals
- Josh Klinghoffer – guitar, six-string bass, backing vocals
- Chad Smith – drums, percussion

=== Additional musicians ===
- Mauro Refosco – percussion
- Chris Warren – keyboards
