= Red Hot Chili Peppers Live: I'm with You =

Live album by Red Hot Chili Peppers
- Released: August 30, 2011
- Recorded: August 30, 2011
- Genre: Alternative rock, funk rock
- Length: 92 minutes
- Label: Warner Bros.

Red Hot Chili Peppers chronology
iTunes Originals – Red Hot Chili Peppers (2006)	Red Hot Chili Peppers Live: I'm with You (2011)	Red Hot Chili Peppers: Live from the Basement (2012)

Red Hot Chili Peppers video chronology
iTunes Originals – Red Hot Chili Peppers (2006)	Red Hot Chili Peppers Live: I'm with You (2011)	Red Hot Chili Peppers: Live from the Basement (2012)

Red Hot Chili Peppers Live: I'm with You is the title of 2011 live concert by Red Hot Chili Peppers which was recorded live on August 30, 2011, at E-Werk in Cologne, Germany and shown via satellite (although on a delayed broadcast and not live) at select movie theaters. Encore presentations were shown on September 1, 2011.

The concert featured a full album performance (minus one song) of the band's, I'm with You, which was released in North America the previous day and in the following days in other areas of the world. This marks the only time in the band's near 30-year history that an album has ever been performed in sequence.

== Background ==
In early August 2011 it was announced that the band had plans to stream a full live performance of their upcoming album worldwide. Tickets went on sale August 5, 2011 at the box office of each theater where the film would be shown along with online movie ticket outlets. Moviegoers who got to the theater prior to the screening of the performance were treated to various new exclusive interviews by each band member.

== Songs performed ==
The original plan was to perform all fourteen songs in sequence from the album and the event was being promoted as a full album performance however the band decided to not perform "Even You Brutus?" and it remains the only song from the album to never be performed live. Flea mentioned that the song was not played due to problems with playing both bass and piano on the song. During the concert the band also had technical problems during the performance of "Did I Let You Know" so they performed it again during their encore.

All songs written by Flea, Kiedis, Klinghoffer, Smith, except where noted.

1. "Monarchy of Roses
2. "Factory of Faith"
3. "Brendan's Death Song"
4. "Ethiopia"
5. "Annie Wants a Baby"
6. "Look Around"
  - "Frankenstein" (The Edgar Winter Group) (tease)
7. "The Adventures of Rain Dance Maggie"
  - Jam
8. "Did I Let You Know"
  - Drums and percussion jam
9. "Goodbye Hooray"
  - Flea piano solo
10. "Happiness Loves Company"
11. "Police Station"
12. "Meet Me At the Corner"
13. "Dance, Dance, Dance"
14. "Me and My Friends (Flea, Kiedis, Slovak, Irons)
15. "Did I Let You Know" (performed again due to previous technical problems)
16. "Give It Away" (Flea, Kiedis, Frusciante, Smith)

== Personnel ==
- Flea – bass, piano, backing vocals
- Anthony Kiedis – lead vocals
- Josh Klinghoffer – guitar, six-string bass, backing vocals
- Chad Smith – drums, percussion

=== Additional musicians ===
- Michael Bulger – trumpet, piano
- Mauro Refosco – percussion
- Chris Warren – keyboards
