= Red Hot Chili Peppers 2013–2014 Tour =

2013–14 concert tour by the Red Hot Chili Peppers

Red Hot Chili Peppers 2013/2014 Tour
- Tour by Red Hot Chili Peppers
- Promotional poster for the band's 2014 appearance at the Isle of Wight Festival
- Associated album: I'm with You
- Start date: May 11, 2013
- End date: June 14, 2014
- Legs: 7
- No. of shows: 22

Red Hot Chili Peppers concert chronology
- I'm with You World Tour (2011–2013); Red Hot Chili Peppers 2013/2014 Tour (2013–2014); The Getaway World Tour (2016–2017)

The Red Hot Chili Peppers 2013/2014 Tour was a concert tour by Red Hot Chili Peppers. The tour followed the band's almost two-year-long I'm with You World Tour which ended in April 2013. The tour featured many festival performances and included the band's first ever shows in Alaska, Paraguay, the Philippines and Puerto Rico. The band also performed in New York City for the first time since 2003 and gave a controversial performance during the halftime show of Super Bowl XLVIII, which was seen by a record-breaking 115.3 million viewers worldwide. During the tour, the band started work on their eleventh studio album in February 2014.

== Background ==
In May, the band gave a special performance for Dalai Lama at the Dalai Lama Environmental Summit. The tour will also feature the band's very first shows in Alaska, where they had previously attempted to perform four times on the One Hot Minute Tour in 1997; however, they were forced to cancel due to various problems including injuries, scheduling conflicts and drug problems. Tickets for the Alaska show were in such high demand, selling out in three hours which prompted the band to schedule another show there. They will also make their first trip since September 2011 to Brazil and will perform their first ever show in Paraguay.

Prior to their two Alaskan dates, the band performed a private birthday party at the million dollar mansion of Lululemon founder Chip Wilson in Vancouver.

The band performed a special benefit concert in October for Flea's Silverlake Conservatory of Music which was hosted by Flea and Kiedis and featured a special headlining performance by Neil Young. A silent auction was held and also featured donations from Marc Jacobs, Tony Hawk, Pearl Jam, Gucci and others. The band also announced their very first show ever in Puerto Rico which took place on April 6, 2014.

The band was one of the main headliners at the 2014 Isle of Wight Festival on June 14, 2014. This was the band's only UK and Ireland appearance in 2014 and will mark the band's first UK festival since 2007. The band said performing at the legendary festival, "To headline the Isle of Wight Festival is a once in a lifetime opportunity, following in the footsteps of Jimi Hendrix and The Doors. When we were offered the slot, we jumped at the chance. We intend to make it really special."

The band gave a surprise unannounced performance on the May 22, 2014, episode of The Tonight Show Starring Jimmy Fallon. Chad Smith and actor Will Ferrell competed in a drum-off and were joined by Kiedis, Flea and Klinghoffer for a performance of "Don't Fear the Reaper" with Ferrell playing cowbell. The Chili Peppers were later joined by The Roots for a performance of Parliament Funkadelic's "Standing on the Verge of Getting it On" and "Give it Away".

The final show on the tour at the Isle of Wight festival was cut short by four songs due to the band taking the stage 15 minutes late and local curfew laws.

=== Anthony Kiedis security guard scuffle ===
On June 21, 2013, prior to the Chili Peppers show that night in Delaware, Anthony Kiedis, along with his tour manager, Gage Freeman and a female friend were attempting to enter the Four Seasons hotel in Philadelphia to see the Rolling Stones before they left for their own concert, when a security guard mistook Kiedis for a fan and made an attempt to block him from entering. A scuffle broke out with the guard attempting to slam Kiedis to the ground with hotel security, Freeman and a bystander coming to his aid. After a brief discussion with the guard and hotel security, Kiedis and the guard shook hands, with Kiedis's only response on the situation being "I love the Rolling Stones". The Four Seasons and The Rolling Stones management said the guard did not work for them; however, they speculated he was a local guard hired to supplement their regular security team. Moments after the scuffle, the Rolling Stones exited the building to their awaiting limos.

=== Chad Smith's death threats ===
On November 8, 2013, while the band was in Brazil, the band's drummer, Chad Smith, made an appearance at a drum clinic where he was presented with a soccer jersey from a local Brazilian Flamengo team. Smith, who was appearing in the city of the team's hated rival, proceeded to jokingly place the jersey down his pants and threw it on the floor. Fans in attendance responded with boos and one person even threw an object at Smith, barely missing his head. Smith attempted to calm the crowd down, telling them he was kidding and the only place that it's OK to hate something or someone is in sports. Following his appearance, fans took to the internet, including YouTube, in outrage over Smith's joke, feeling it was completely disrespectful. Some fans issued more dangerous threats towards Smith by saying he would be killed or pelted with grenades or rocks on stage when the band performed in Brazil. Smith issued a statement through Twitter stating, "'I want to apologize for my inappropriate antics at the drum clinic, my joke about team rivalries went too far. Flamengo fans...I'm sorry" The post was accompanied by pictures of Smith wearing the Flamengo team jersey along with hanging out signing autographs for the team's supporters in attempts to further smooth over the situation. Smith even promised to wear the jersey for 24 hours and personally visit the team to apologize to the players. The band performed the following night without any problems.

=== Super Bowl XLVIII performance controversy ===
On January 10, 2014, it was announced that the band would be joining Bruno Mars as part of the Super Bowl XLVIII halftime show on February 2, 2014.

When asked about what the band would perform, Smith jokingly stated it would be Led Zeppelin's "Dazed and Confused". Many in the media, however, did not understand the joke (Led Zeppelin's song is usually 12–30 minutes long when performed) and started reporting that they would perform the song with Mars. Smith had to clear up the confusion by saying "People in the media are so gullible sometimes. We will, however, be performing side one of Rush's 2112." Flea also made a joke about the Super Bowl performance through his Twitter page asking fans "Anybody wanna see my cock at the Super Bowl?" The Tweet was quickly removed but not before the media picked up on it, started reporting on his Tweet to which Flea was forced to respond by saying the Tweet was misleading and he has no plans of getting naked during the performance. The band is expected to join Mars on stage and appear for 3 minutes during his set. Smith said "There's no pressure on us. It's his gig. We're just gonna crash his gig for like three minutes, and then we pop up and things blow up."

On February 1, 2014, the band performed at a special pre-Super Bowl XLVIII concert in Brooklyn, New York. This was the band's first show in New York since May 2003 during their By the Way tour.

During the halftime show, the Chili Peppers joined Mars onstage for a three-minute performance of "Give It Away". Mars and the Chili Peppers generated 2.2 million tweets during the 12-minute performance, many from celebrities. Reviews of the performance were mixed for both artists. Some even commented on Kiedis' shirtless body and age, with some amazed with how good he looked, while some felt he was too old to go shirtless. A lot of complaints from the media, viewers and even fellow musicians were directed towards Flea and Klinghoffer who were accused of faking their performance because their instruments were not plugged in. Flea responded to the complaints through the band's website by saying "When we were asked by the NFL and Bruno to play our song "Give It Away" at the Super Bowl, it was made clear to us that the vocals would be live, but the bass, drums, and guitar would be pre-recorded. I understand the NFL's stance on this, given they only have a few minutes to set up the stage, there a zillion things that could go wrong and ruin the sound for the folks watching in the stadium and the t.v. viewers. There was not any room for argument on this, the NFL does not want to risk their show being botched by bad sound, period. For the actual performance, Josh, Chad, and I were playing along with the pre recorded track (which was recorded earlier that week) so there was no need to plug in our guitars, so we did not. Could we have plugged them in and avoided bumming people out who have expressed disappointment that the instrument track was pre recorded? Of course, easily, we could have, and this would be a non-issue. We thought it better to not pretend. It seemed like the realest thing to do in the circumstance. We decided that, with Anthony singing live, we could still bring the spirit and freedom of what we do into the performance, and of course we played every note in the recording specially for the gig." Chad Smith responded to the controversy through his Twitter page a few days later saying "FYI... Every band in the last 10 years at the Super Bowl has performed to a previously recorded track. It's the NFL 's policy. Period." Klinghoffer said in an April 2014 interview that out of the four members, Smith was most against performing this way. The band even received some complaints from fans who contacted the U.S. Federal Communications Commission. Some wrote or called in about how they were actually offended by shirtless men and how both men and women should remained clothed because children were watching.

The halftime show set a record for the most watched halftime performance in Super Bowl history. The show pulled in 115.3 million viewers, better than Beyoncé did in 2013 with 110.8 million and shattering the previous halftime record Madonna set in 2012 with 114 million watching. The Super Bowl was also the most watched television show in U.S. history.

== Tour overview ==
Song selections for the setlists have not changed from the previous tour. Nothing new has been added to the setlists; further, songs from I'm with You and the previous three albums, along with Blood Sugar Sex Magik make up most of the material performed, which are mostly filled with the band's hits and better known songs. The most a setlist changed was during the band's April 2, 2014, performance at Lollapalooza in Argentina in which "The Power of Equality", typically a song performed during encores, opened the set for the first time ever while "If You Have to Ask", normally a mid-set song, was played during the encore. One show later, "Higher Ground" made its first ever appearance as a show opener. "Me and My Friends" and "Higher Ground" remain the only two songs from the band's 1980s albums to be performed making it the smallest selection of songs from that era to date for any of the band's tours. Even the teases of older songs from the band's catalog performed by Josh Klinghoffer have mostly been absent. Also, as with most of the previous tours, shows have lasted a little under two hours with 16–18 songs performed. "Encore", a song that would be featured on the band's 2016 album, The Getaway, originally started out as an instrumental jam and was performed for the first time on this tour.

This tour marked the last time "Meet Me at the Corner" and "Monarchy of Roses" were performed live.

== Tour dates ==
Date	City	Country	Venue
North America
May 11, 2013	Portland	United States	Veterans Memorial Coliseum
June 8, 2013^{[A]}	Detroit	United States	Belle Isle Park
June 21, 2013 ^{[B]}	Dover	United States	Dover International Speedway
August 3, 2013 ^{[F]}	Vancouver	Canada	Kitsilano
August 5, 2013	Anchorage	United States	Sullivan Arena
August 6, 2013	Anchorage	United States	Sullivan Arena
August 11, 2013 ^{[C]}	San Francisco	United States	Golden Gate Park
September 21, 2013 ^{[D]}	Atlanta	United States	Piedmont Park
October 30, 2013 ^{[E]}	Los Angeles	United States	Silverlake Conservatory of Music
South America
November 2, 2013 ^{[G]}	Belo Horizonte	Brazil	Mega Space
November 5, 2013	Asunción	Paraguay	Jockey Club
November 7, 2013	São Paulo	Brazil	Arena Anhembi
November 9, 2013 ^{[G]}	Rio de Janeiro	Brazil	Parque dos Atletas
North America
February 1, 2014 ^{[H]}	New York City	United States	Barclays Center
February 2, 2014 ^{[I]}	East Rutherford	United States	MetLife Stadium
Asia
February 23, 2014 ^{[J]}	Pampanga	Philippines	Global Gateway Logistics City
South America
March 29, 2014 ^{[K]}	Santiago	Chile	O'Higgins Park
April 2, 2014 ^{[K]}	San Isidro	Argentina	Hipódromo de San Isidro
April 4, 2014^{[L]}	Bogotá	Colombia	Parque 222
North America
April 6, 2014	San Juan	Puerto Rico	Coliseo de Puerto Rico José Miguel Agrelot
May 22, 2014 ^{[M]}	New York City	United States	NBC Studios
Europe
June 14, 2014^{[N]}	Newport	United Kingdom	Seaclose Park

Festivals and other miscellaneous performances
^{A} This concert was a part of "Orion Music + More"
^{B} This concert was a part of "Firefly Music Festival"
^{C} This concert was a part of the "Outside Lands Music and Arts Festival"
^{D} This concert was a part of "Music Midtown"
^{E} This concert is a benefit for the Silverlake Conservatory of Music hosted by Kiedis and Flea and including a performance by Neil Young
^{F} This concert was private and held at the home of Chip Wilson
^{G} This concert is part of "Circuito Banco do Brasil"
^{H} This concert is part of WFAN'S Big Hello To Brooklyn Super Bowl XLVIII concert
^{I} This concert is part of the Super Bowl XLVIII halftime show
^{J} This concert is part of 7107 International Music Festival
^{K} This concert is part of "Lollapalooza"
^{L} This concert is part of "Festival Estéreo Picnic"
^{M} This performance was a three-song set on The Tonight Show Starring Jimmy Fallon
^{N} This concert if part of the Isle of Wight Festival

=== Box office score data ===
Venue	City	Tickets sold / Available	Gross revenue
Sullivan Arena	Anchorage	12,827 / 12,827 (100%)	$833,755
Hipódromo de Asunción	Asunción	19,710 / 20,050 (98%)	$1,015,590

== Songs performed ==
=== Originals ===
Song	Album
"Why Don't You Love Me" (Hank Williams) (tease)	The Red Hot Chili Peppers
"Funky Crime (tease)"	The Uplift Mofo Party Plan
"Me and My Friends"	The Uplift Mofo Party Plan
"Higher Ground" (Stevie Wonder)	Mother's Milk
"Magic Johnson" (tease)	Mother's Milk
"Blood Sugar Sex Magik"	Blood Sugar Sex Magik
"Give It Away"	Blood Sugar Sex Magik
"I Could Have Lied"	Blood Sugar Sex Magik
"If You Have to Ask"	Blood Sugar Sex Magik
"Sir Psycho Sexy"	Blood Sugar Sex Magik
"Suck My Kiss"	Blood Sugar Sex Magik
"The Greeting Song" (tease)	Blood Sugar Sex Magik
"The Power of Equality"	Blood Sugar Sex Magik
"They're Red Hot" (Robert Johnson)	Blood Sugar Sex Magik
"Under the Bridge"	Blood Sugar Sex Magik
"Sikamikanico" (tease)	Wayne's World: Music from the Motion Picture
"Soul to Squeeze"	Coneheads: Music from the Motion Picture Soundtrack
"Let's Make Evil" (tease)	My Friends (single)
"Around the World"	Californication
"Californication"	Californication
"I Like Dirt"	Californication
"Otherside"	Californication
"Parallel Universe"	Californication
"Right on Time"	Californication
"Scar Tissue"	Californication
"By the Way"	By the Way
"Can't Stop"	By the Way
"Dosed" (tease)	By the Way
"Throw Away Your Television"	By the Way
"Universally Speaking"	By the Way
"The Zephyr Song" (tease)	By the Way
"Dani California"	Stadium Arcadium
"Especially in Michigan" (tease)	Stadium Arcadium
"Hard to Concentrate"	Stadium Arcadium
"She's Only 18"	Stadium Arcadium
"Snow ((Hey Oh))"	Stadium Arcadium
"Wet Sand"	Stadium Arcadium
"The Adventures of Rain Dance Maggie"	I'm with You
"Did I Let You Know"	I'm with You
"Ethiopia"	I'm with You
"Factory of Faith"	I'm with You
"Look Around"	I'm with You
"Meet Me at the Corner"	I'm with You
"Monarchy of Roses"	I'm with You
"Brave From Afar" (tease)	I'm Beside You
"Encore" (instrumental jam)	The Getaway

=== Cover songs ===
Song	Artist
"Amazing Grace" (performed by Flea)	Written by John Newton
"Andy Warhol"	David Bowie
"Angel"	Jimi Hendrix
"Another One Bites the Dust"	Queen
"Chocolate City"	Funkadelic
"Classic Girl" (performed by Flea)	Jane's Addiction
"Communication Breakdown"	Led Zeppelin
"Crazy on You"	Heart
"Don't Fear the Reaper" (with Will Ferrell on cowbell)	Blue Öyster Cult
"Drop the Bomb" (performed by Flea)	Trouble Funk
"Enter Sandman"	Metallica
"Everybody Knows This Is Nowhere"	Neil Young
"Get Off Your Ass and Jam"	Funkadelic
"I Would for You"	Jane's Addiction
"I'm Waiting for the Man"	The Velvet Underground
"Irene"	Caetano Veloso
"Red Hot Mama"	Funkadelic
"Ride Into the Sun" (sung by Josh)	The Velvet Underground
"Sleep's Dark and Silent Gate" (sung by Josh)	Jackson Browne
"Standing on the Verge of Getting It On" (with The Roots and Jimmy Fallon)	Funkadelic
"The Song Remains the Same"	Led Zeppelin
"The Star-Spangled Banner" (performed by Flea)	Written by Francis Scott Key
"Sunday Bloody Sunday"	U2
"The Unforgiven"	Metallica
"We Care a Lot" (teased by Anthony)	Faith No More

== Personnel ==
- Flea – bass, backing vocals
- Anthony Kiedis – lead vocals
- Josh Klinghoffer – guitar, backing vocals
- Chad Smith – drums, percussion

=== Additional musicians ===
- Mauro Refosco – percussion
- Chris Warren – keyboards

=== Guest musicians ===
- Bruno Mars + backing band – co-lead vocals, backing musicians (during the Super Bowl halftime show performance of "Give it Away")
- Will Ferrell – cowbell (on "Don't Fear the Reaper" during Tonight Show appearance)
- The Roots – backing musicians (on "Standing on the Verge of Getting it On" during the Tonight Show appearance)
- Jimmy Fallon – backing vocals (on "Standing on the Verge of Getting it On" during the Tonight Show appearance)
