= I'm with You =

I'm with You may refer to:

== Albums ==
- I'm with You (album), by the Red Hot Chili Peppers, 2011
  - I'm with You World Tour, a tour for the album
    - I'm with You World Tour (EP), 2014
  - I'm with You Sessions, a series of previously unreleased songs from the album's sessions
- I'm with You, by Delbert McClinton, 1990
- I'm with You, by Sadao Watanabe, 2015

== Songs ==
- "I'm with You" (Avril Lavigne song), 2002
- "I'm with You" (Vance Joy song), 2018
- "I'm with You", by Wally Lewis, 1958
- "I'm with You", by the "5" Royales, 1960
- "I'm with You", by the Big Three, 1963
- "I'm with You", by Tommy Hunt, 1963
- "I'm with You", by the Stills from Oceans Will Rise, 2008
- "I'm With You", from the video game Sonic Frontiers, 2022
- "I'm with You", by Bon Jovi from What About Now, 2013

== See also ==
- I Am with You (disambiguation)
- I'm with You Always, a 1977 live album by Mike Bloomfield
