= I'm with You World Tour =

2011–13 concert tour by Red Hot Chili Peppers

- Tour by Red Hot Chili Peppers
- Promotional poster for 3/5/13 show in Mexico
- Location: Africa; Asia; Europe; Oceania; Americas
- Associated album: I'm with You
- Start date: September 11, 2011
- End date: April 21, 2013
- Legs: 8
- No. of shows: 136
- Box office: $127.2 million

Red Hot Chili Peppers concert chronology
- Stadium Arcadium World Tour (2006–2007); I'm with You World Tour (2011–2013); Red Hot Chili Peppers 2013–2014 Tour (2013–2014)

The I'm with You World Tour was a worldwide concert tour by American rock band, the Red Hot Chili Peppers in support of the band's tenth studio album, I'm with You. It marked the band's first tour in four years and first with guitarist Josh Klinghoffer, who replaced John Frusciante in 2009. The band was also joined for the first time by backing musicians Mauro Refosco (percussion) and Chris Warren (keyboards). The first North American leg of the tour was briefly postponed due to a leg injury sustained by singer Anthony Kiedis which required surgery. Klinghoffer also broke his foot during the tour; however, no dates were cancelled due to his injury. During the tour the band saw a few milestones come and go such as their own 30th anniversary since forming in 1983 and the 10th, 20th and 25th anniversaries of their albums, By the Way, Blood Sugar Sex Magik and The Uplift Mofo Party Plan. Despite these milestones, the band made little to no mention of them and no special performances were given on their behalf. The band was also named 2012 inductees to the Rock and Roll Hall of Fame while on tour.

The tour ranked 15th on Billboard's "Top 25 Tours" list of 2012, earning over $30 million from its 42 shows. Additionally, the tour placed 10th on Pollstar's 2012 "Top 50 Worldwide Tours", earning nearly $60 million.

== Background ==
Before the tour commenced, the band played several one-off shows and music festivals; including the Summer Sonic Festival. During an interview with Rolling Stone, frontman Anthony Kiedis stated they were in rehearsals for an extensive world tour. He said, "I know when we write mediocre stuff, and when we write good stuff. I can't wait to go out and play this". There was also hope among fans that the band would again perform songs from 1995's One Hot Minute. "Pea", a song written and sung by Flea, has been the only song from the album performed live since 1997. When Frusciante returned to the band in 1998 he felt uneasy to play those songs, so the band never considered performing them. However, Kiedis announced during a pre-tour interview that nothing from One Hot Minute would be performed. He stated that it was not that he did not like those songs and there were a few that he highly valued; however, he felt those songs did not fit the vibe of current setlists they had planned. Kiedis was asked about performing songs from the album and although he stated he liked the songs from the album, citing "Aeroplane" as a favorite, Kiedis said the music did not fit with the vision he had for the tour's setlists.

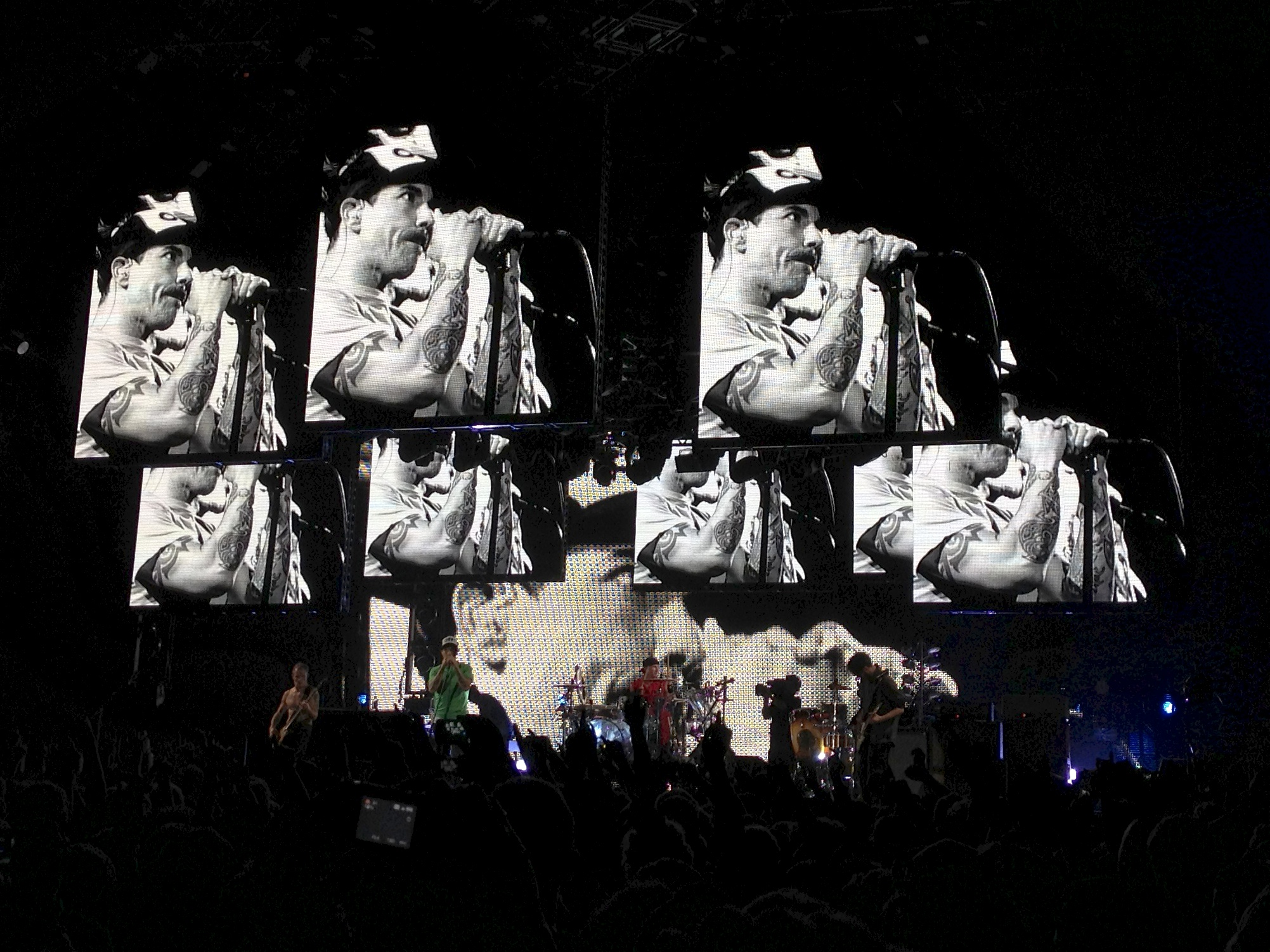
The band performing on November 20, 2011. From left to right: Flea, Anthony Kiedis, Chad Smith and Josh Klinghoffer

The tour was officially announced in July 2011, while the band was on a promotional tour for the record. Sound engineer, Dave Rat said the tour will last into 2013 and the band's schedule will be spent 3 weeks on the road and 2 weeks off throughout the tour, a plan they have followed on previous tours. For the world tour, the band added percussionist Mauro Refosco and Chris Warren, their drum tech, to play keyboards. During the promo tour, the band filmed a second version (the band didn't agree with the original version) of the music video for The Adventures of Rain Dance Maggie, the album's first single on a rooftop in Venice Beach. The band performed various songs in between takes for the onlookers below. Upon album release, the band performed a concert in Cologne, Germany; where the group played the entire album in sequence minus one song. Deemed, "Red Hot Chili Peppers Live: I'm With You", the concert was streamed via satellite into movie theaters in various parts of the world including Europe and North America.

Promotional poster for a North American show

The tour began in September 2011 at the Simón Bolívar Park in Bogotá, Colombia. The shows in Chile, Brazil, Peru, Argentina marked the band's first shows in South America in nine years. The band finished out 2011 with shows in Europe. As the North American leg of the tour approached frontman Kiedis sustained a foot injury. Dates were postponed and later rescheduled. In April 2012 the band was inducted into the Rock and Roll Hall of Fame where they performed a few songs and were joined by former drummers Jack Irons and Cliff Martinez on "Give It Away" marking the first time the two drummers had performed with the band since their departures in the 1980s. The day following the ceremony, the band played a free show at the House of Blues for Obama reelection volunteers. During the concerts in Florida, the band wore hoodies in support of the Trayvon Martin case. The band was joined onstage by Jack Irons and Cliff Martinez during the encore of their August 12, 2012 show at Staples Center just like they were at the hall of fame induction performance earlier in the year for a performance of "Give It Away". Josh Klinghoffer broke his foot during the band's August 14, 2012 show. The following night he was in a walking boot. Klinghoffer used a chair when needed on stage to get through the performances until his foot was properly healed. No dates were cancelled or postponed due to his injury. Chad Smith said Klinghoffer's injury would not have any effect on the tour and joked he actually plays better since hurting his foot. It was around this time during the summer of 2012 tour dates that Klinghoffer began to tease various songs from the band's back catalog, many of which haven not been played in years, such as "My Friends", or ever before such as "Gong Li" and "Long Progression", an outtake from I'm with You. Most teases occurred prior to the performance of "Under the Bridge".

During the tour in October, Flea celebrated his 50th birthday by holding an event celebrating his life and his work of giving back to the community. The event was held in his backyard and was part birthday bash, part fundraiser for his nonprofit school, Silverlake Conservatory of Music. The Chili Peppers performed a rare acoustic set featuring some songs from the band's catalog performed acoustically for the first time ever while Rancid and Ben Harper also performed at the event. In late October 2012, the band appeared on Nigel Godrich's show, From the Basement where they were said to have performed the entire album and according to Chad Smith, "Even You Brutus?" was performed for the first time ever making it the last of the songs from the current album to be performed live. According to Smith, the show was filmed in 3D. The show was released online in late 2012; however, a full performance was not released and "Even You Brutus?" was again absent.

The band dedicated their 2013 shows in Australia to the anti-whaling movement called Sea Shepherd Conservation Society, a group devoted to prevent the killing of whales. The band incorporated Sea Shepherd visuals into their performance and featured a stall at each of the venues to provide festival goers with information about the group's campaigns, which include anti-whaling missions and marine conservation. The band also started to perform a full version of David Bowie's "What in the World", during their 2013 dates.

It was announced in October 2012 by Chad Smith that the tour would officially come to an end in April 2013. In early 2013, Smith further confirmed that the tour would end with two dates at the Coachella Valley Music and Arts Festival on April 14 and April 21, 2013. Smith stated on his Twitter page "Will be Our 3rd time playing Coachella festival this April...nice way to end up our IWY tour". Following a brief break after the tour, the band will perform at a few U.S. festivals in the summer with Flea and touring percussionist, Mauro Refosco touring with their side-project, Atoms for Peace in late 2013. When asked in March 2013 about the band's next album, Smith said they plan to start writing new music in September 2013.

== Tour overview ==
The band performed a total of fifty songs from their catalog of music along with numerous teases of older classics and cover songs mostly performed by Klinghoffer as intros to other songs. The setlists were made up of many of the band's biggest hits with songs from their current album along with their previous three albums and 1991's Blood Sugar Sex Magik being the main focus of the setlists, which were always written by Kiedis. "Freaky Styley", "Me and My Friends", "Higher Ground" and "Fire" were the only songs from the band's 1980s albums to be performed. "Hard to Concentrate" from Stadium Arcadium was debuted on October 14, 2011. Halfway into the tour, Klinghoffer began to tease various songs from the band's catalog as intros to other songs. Many of the teased songs have not been performed in their entirety in years, some never performed. As with every tour dating back to 1999, "Pea" remained the lone song from the band's 1995 album, One Hot Minute to be performed. Almost every show (with the exception of some early dates) opened with "Monarchy of Roses" while each encore opened up with a drum and percussion jam by Chad Smith, Mauro Refosco and sometimes Josh Klinghoffer while "Give it Away" followed by a lengthy jam would close out the shows, which normally lasted slightly under two hours and usually around 16 to 18 songs performed.

This tour marked the last time "Annie Wants a Baby", "Brendan's Death Song", "Dance, Dance, Dance", "Goodbye Hooray", "Happiness Loves Company" and "Police Station" were performed live. It was also marked their first performances in several different countries, including: Bulgaria, Colombia, Ukraine, South Africa, Estonia, Latvia, Lithuania, Greece, Turkey, Croatia, Guatemala, Israel, Lebanon, Peru, Romania and Paraguay.

== Songs performed ==
=== Originals ===
Song	Album
"Get Up and Jump" (tease)	The Red Hot Chili Peppers (1984)
"Grand Pappy du Plenty" (tease)	The Red Hot Chili Peppers (1984)
"Police Helicopter" (Flea and Chad tease)	The Red Hot Chili Peppers (1984)
"True Men Don't Kill Coyotes" (tease)	The Red Hot Chili Peppers (1984)
"American Ghost Dance" (first verse/chorus only)"	Freaky Styley (1985)
"Freaky Styley"	Freaky Styley (1985)
"The Brother's Cup" (tease)	Freaky Styley (1985)
"Hollywood (Africa)" (tease)	Freaky Styley (1985)
"Jungle Man" (tease)	Freaky Styley (1985)
"Yertle the Turtle" (tease)	Freaky Styley (1985)
"Behind the Sun" (tease)	The Uplift Mofo Party Plan (1987)
"Funky Crime" (tease)	The Uplift Mofo Party Plan (1987)
"Me and My Friends"	The Uplift Mofo Party Plan (1987)
"No Chump Love Sucker" (tease)	The Uplift Mofo Party Plan (1987)
"Organic Anti-Beat Box Band" (tease)	The Uplift Mofo Party Plan (1987)
"Skinny Sweaty Man" (partially performed)	The Uplift Mofo Party Plan (1987)
"Fire" (Jimi Hendrix)	The Abbey Road E.P. (1988)
"Higher Ground" (Stevie Wonder)	Mother's Milk (1989)
"Magic Johnson" (tease)	Mother's Milk (1989)
"Stone Cold Bush" (tease)	Mother's Milk (1989)
"Apache Rose Peacock" (partially performed)	Blood Sugar Sex Magik (1991)
"Blood Sugar Sex Magik"	Blood Sugar Sex Magik (1991)
"Breaking the Girl"	Blood Sugar Sex Magik (1991)
"Give It Away"	Blood Sugar Sex Magik (1991)
"I Could Have Lied"	Blood Sugar Sex Magik (1991)
"If You Have to Ask"	Blood Sugar Sex Magik (1991)
"Mellowship Slinky in B Major" (tease)	Blood Sugar Sex Magik (1991)
"My Lovely Man" (tease)	Blood Sugar Sex Magik (1991)
"The Power of Equality"	Blood Sugar Sex Magik (1991)
"Sir Psycho Sexy"	Blood Sugar Sex Magik (1991)
"Suck My Kiss"	Blood Sugar Sex Magik (1991)
"They're Red Hot" (Robert Johnson)	Blood Sugar Sex Magik (1991)
"Under the Bridge"	Blood Sugar Sex Magik (1991)
"Soul to Squeeze"	Coneheads: Music from the Motion Picture Soundtrack (1993)
"Pea"	One Hot Minute (1995)
"My Friends" (tease)	One Hot Minute (1995)
"Walkabout" (tease)	One Hot Minute (1995)
"Around the World"	Californication (1999)
"Californication"	Californication (1999)
"Emit Remmus"	Californication (1999)
"I Like Dirt"	Californication (1999)
"Otherside"	Californication (1999)
"Parallel Universe"	Californication (1999)
"Quixoticelixer" (iTunes bonus track) (tease)	Californication (1999)
"Right on Time"	Californication (1999)
"Road Trippin'" (tease)	Californication (1999)
"Scar Tissue"	Californication (1999)
"Gong Li"	"Scar Tissue" (single) (1999)
"Instrumental #1" (tease)	"Scar Tissue" (single) (1999)
"By the Way"	By the Way (2002)
"Can't Stop"	By the Way (2002)
"Don't Forget Me"	By the Way (2002)
"Dosed" (tease)	By the Way (2002)
"I Could Die for You" (tease)	By the Way (2002)
"Throw Away Your Television"	By the Way (2002)
"Universally Speaking"	By the Way (2002)
"The Zephyr Song" (tease)	By the Way (2002)
"Fortune Faded" (tease)	Greatest Hits (2003)
"Charlie"	Stadium Arcadium (2006)
"Dani California"	Stadium Arcadium (2006)
"Hard to Concentrate"	Stadium Arcadium (2006)
"Hey"	Stadium Arcadium (2006)
"She's Only 18"	Stadium Arcadium (2006)
"Snow ((Hey Oh))"	Stadium Arcadium (2006)
"Stadium Arcadium" (tease)	Stadium Arcadium (2006)
"Strip My Mind"	Stadium Arcadium (2006)
"Tell Me Baby"	Stadium Arcadium (2006)
"Wet Sand"	Stadium Arcadium (2006)
"The Adventures of Rain Dance Maggie"	I'm with You (2011)
"Annie Wants a Baby"	I'm with You (2011)
"Brendan's Death Song"	I'm with You (2011)
"Dance, Dance, Dance"	I'm with You (2011)
"Did I Let You Know"	I'm with You (2011)
"Ethiopia"	I'm with You (2011)
"Factory of Faith"	I'm with You (2011)
"Goodbye Hooray"	I'm with You (2011)
"Happiness Loves Company"	I'm with You (2011)
"Look Around"	I'm with You (2011)
"Meet Me at the Corner"	I'm with You (2011)
"Monarchy of Roses"	I'm with You (2011)
"Police Station"	I'm with You (2011)
"Brave from Afar" (tease)	I'm Beside You (2013)
"In Love, Dying" (tease)	I'm Beside You (2013)
"Long Progression" (tease)	I'm Beside You (2013)
"Love of Your Life" (tease)	I'm Beside You (2013)
"Magpies on Fire" (tease)	I'm Beside You (2013)
"Never Is a Long Time" (tease)	I'm Beside You (2013)
"Pink as Floyd" (tease)	I'm Beside You (2013)
"Strange Man" (tease)	I'm Beside You (2013)
"The Sunset Sleeps" (tease)	I'm Beside You (2013)
"This Is the Kitt" (tease)	I'm Beside You (2013)
"Dreams of a Samurai" (instrumental jam)	The Getaway (2016)
"Encore" (instrumental jam)	The Getaway (2016)
"We've Got the Biggest Cocks"	(made up song by Flea originating from the late 80s/early 90s and sung over a Miles Davis song)

=== Cover songs (performed as intros/jams/teases unless noted) ===
Song	Artist
"99 Luftballons"	Nena
"Auld Lang Syne"	Robert Burns
"Birthday"	The Beatles
"Boyz-n-the-Hood"	Eazy-E
"Burn On" (sung/performed by Josh)	Randy Newman
"Castles Made of Sand"	Jimi Hendrix
"Cholly"	Funkadelic
"Clap Your Hands"	Nile Rodgers
"Cosmic Slop"	Funkadelic
"D'yer Mak'er	Led Zeppelin
"Don't Dream It's Over" (sung/performed by Josh)	Crowded House
"Dream a Little Dream of Me"	Andre/Schwandt/Kahn
"Everybody Dance"	Chic
"Everybody Knows This Is Nowhere" (full song/entire band)	Neil Young
"F.U. (Bemsha Swing)"	Thelonious Monk
"Frankenstein"	The Edgar Winter Group
"Good to Your Earhole"	Funkadelic
"Gratitude"	Beastie Boys
"Theme from Halloween"	John Carpenter
"Heart of Gold"	Neil Young
"The House of the Rising Sun"	Traditional
"I Call My Baby Pussycat"	Funkadelic
"I Love Livin' in the City"	Fear
"Io sono quel che sono" (sung/performed by Josh)	Mina
"I'm Too Sexy"	Right Said Fred
"Louie Louie" (performed with Toots Hibbert)	Richard Berry
"Love Is a Many-Splendored Thing"	Paul Francis Webster
"Maggie May"	Rod Stewart
"Maggie's Farm"	Bob Dylan
"Making Our Dreams Come True" (Theme to Laverne & Shirley) (sung/performed by Josh)	Cyndi Grecco
"Master of Puppets"	Metallica
"Mr. Big Stuff"	Jean Knight
"The Ocean"	Led Zeppelin
"Orange Claw Hammer"	Captain Beefheart
"Rape Me"	Nirvana
"Red Hot Mama"	Funkadelic
"Right"	David Bowie
"So What'cha Want"	Beastie Boys
"Tender"	Blur
"Theme From The Godfather"	Nino Rota
"The Victors" (sung/performed by Chad)	University of Michigan fight song
"The Wanton Song"	Led Zeppelin
"Warszawa"	David Bowie
"(We Don't Need This) Fascist Groove Thang" (full song/entire band)	Heaven 17
"What in the World" (full song/entire band)	David Bowie
"What Is Soul?"	George Clinton
"Whole Lotta Rosie"	AC/DC
"You're Gonna Get Yours"	Public Enemy

== Tour dates ==
Date	City	Country	Venue	Opening Act
Latin America
September 11, 2011	Bogotá	Colombia	Simón Bolívar Park	Foals; Son Batá
September 12, 2011	San José	Costa Rica	Estadio Nacional de Costa Rica	Foals
September 14, 2011	Lima	Peru	Estadio Nacional	Foals
September 16, 2011	Santiago	Chile	Estadio Monumental	Foals; Chancho En Piedra
September 18, 2011	Buenos Aires	Argentina	River Plate Stadium	Foals
September 21, 2011	São Paulo	Brazil	Arena Anhembi	Foals
September 24, 2011^{[A]}	Rio de Janeiro	Brazil	Parque Olímpico Cidade do Rock	Foals
Europe
October 7, 2011	Cologne	Germany	Lanxess Arena	Femi Kuti & The Positive Force
October 9, 2011	Hamburg	Germany	O_{2} World Hamburg	Femi Kuti & The Positive Force
October 11, 2011	Stockholm	Sweden	Ericsson Globe	Femi Kuti & The Positive Force
October 12, 2011	Stockholm	Sweden	Ericsson Globe	Femi Kuti & The Positive Force
October 14, 2011	Herning	Denmark	Jyske Bank Boxen	Femi Kuti & The Positive Force
October 16, 2011	Rotterdam	Netherlands	Rotterdam Ahoy	Femi Kuti & The Positive Force
October 18, 2011	Paris	France	Palais Omnisports de Paris-Bercy	Femi Kuti & The Positive Force
October 19, 2011	Paris	France	Palais Omnisports de Paris-Bercy	Femi Kuti & The Positive Force
October 21, 2011	Frankfurt	Germany	Festhalle Frankfurt	Femi Kuti & The Positive Force
November 4, 2011	Dublin	Ireland	The O_{2}	Fool's Gold
November 6, 2011^{[B]}	Belfast	Northern Ireland	Ulster Hall	N/A
November 7, 2011	London	United Kingdom	The O_{2} Arena	Fool's Gold
November 9, 2011	London	United Kingdom	The O_{2} Arena	Fool's Gold
November 10, 2011	London	United Kingdom	The O_{2} Arena	Fool's Gold
November 12, 2011	Glasgow	United Kingdom	Scottish Exhibition and Conference Centre	Fool's Gold
November 14, 2011	Manchester	United Kingdom	Manchester Evening News Arena	Fool's Gold
November 15, 2011	Manchester	United Kingdom	Manchester Evening News Arena	Fool's Gold
November 17, 2011	Sheffield	United Kingdom	Motorpoint Arena Sheffield	Fool's Gold
November 19, 2011	Birmingham	United Kingdom	LG Arena	Fool's Gold
November 20, 2011	Birmingham	United Kingdom	LG Arena	Fool's Gold
December 4, 2011	Berlin	Germany	O_{2} World	Foals
December 5, 2011	Munich	Germany	Olympiahalle	Foals
December 7, 2011	Vienna	Austria	Wiener Stadthalle	Foals
December 10, 2011	Turin	Italy	Torino Palasport Olimpico	Foals
December 11, 2011	Milan	Italy	Mediolanum Forum	Foals
December 13, 2011	Zürich	Switzerland	Hallenstadion	Foals
December 15, 2011	Barcelona	Spain	Palau Sant Jordi	Foals
December 17, 2011	Madrid	Spain	Palacio de Deportes	Foals
December 19, 2011	Paris	France	La Cigale	N/A (Private Show)
North America
March 29, 2012	Tampa	United States	Tampa Bay Times Forum	Santigold
March 31, 2012	Orlando	United States	Amway Center	Santigold
April 2, 2012	Sunrise	United States	BankAtlantic Center	Santigold
April 4, 2012	Raleigh	United States	PNC Arena	Santigold
April 6, 2012	Charlotte	United States	Time Warner Cable Arena	Santigold
April 7, 2012	Columbia	United States	Colonial Life Arena	Santigold
April 9, 2012	Greensboro	United States	Greensboro Coliseum	Santigold
April 10, 2012	Duluth	United States	Arena at Gwinnett Center	Santigold
April 12, 2012	Memphis	United States	FedExForum	Santigold
April 27, 2012	Toronto	Canada	Air Canada Centre	Sleigh Bells
April 28, 2012	Toronto	Canada	Air Canada Centre	Sleigh Bells
April 30, 2012	Ottawa	Canada	Scotiabank Place	Sleigh Bells
May 2, 2012	Montreal	Canada	Bell Centre	Sleigh Bells
May 4, 2012	Newark	United States	Prudential Center	Sleigh Bells
May 5, 2012	Newark	United States	Prudential Center	Sleigh Bells
May 7, 2012	Boston	United States	TD Garden	Sleigh Bells
May 10, 2012	Washington, D.C.	United States	Verizon Center	Sleigh Bells
May 11, 2012	Philadelphia	United States	Wells Fargo Center	Sleigh Bells
May 19, 2012^{[C]}	Gulf Shores	United States	Gulf Shores Public Beach	N/A
May 25, 2012	St. Louis	United States	Scottrade Center	Little Dragon
May 26, 2012	Grand Rapids	United States	Van Andel Arena	Little Dragon
May 28, 2012	Rosemont	United States	Allstate Arena	Little Dragon
May 30, 2012	Pittsburgh	United States	Consol Energy Center	Little Dragon
June 1, 2012	Detroit	United States	Joe Louis Arena	Little Dragon
June 2, 2012	Cleveland	United States	Quicken Loans Arena	Little Dragon
June 4, 2012	Columbus	United States	Value City Arena	Little Dragon
June 6, 2012	Cincinnati	United States	U.S. Bank Arena	Little Dragon
June 7, 2012	Louisville	United States	KFC Yum! Center	Little Dragon
June 9, 2012^{[D]}	Manchester	United States	Great Stage Park	Charles Bradley and His Extraordinaires; The Temper Trap; Santigold; The Roots
Europe
June 23, 2012	Knebworth	England	Knebworth House	Reverend and the Makers; The Wombats; Dizzee Rascal
June 24, 2012	Sunderland	England	Stadium of Light	Reverend and the Makers; The Wombats
June 26, 2012	Dublin	Ireland	Croke Park	Noel Gallagher's High Flying Birds
June 28, 2012	Nijmegen	Netherlands	Goffertpark	Tinariwen; Triggerfinger
June 30, 2012	Saint-Denis	France	Stade de France	Tinariwen
July 1, 2012^{[E]}	Werchter	Belgium	Werchter Festival Grounds	N/A
July 3, 2012	Bern	Switzerland	Stade de Suisse	N/A
July 5, 2012^{[F]}	Rho	Italy	Arena Fiera Milano	N/A
July 7, 2012^{[G]}	Madrid	Spain	Ciudad del Rock	N/A
July 20, 2012	Saint Petersburg	Russia	Petrovsky Stadium	N/A
July 22, 2012	Moscow	Russia	Luzhniki Stadium	Gogol Bordello
July 25, 2012	Kyiv	Ukraine	Olympic Stadium	N/A
July 27, 2012	Warsaw	Poland	Bemowo Airport	N/A
July 28, 2012	Kaunas	Lithuania	Žalgiris Arena	N/A
July 30, 2012	Tallinn	Estonia	Tallinn Song Festival Grounds	N/A
August 1, 2012	Tampere	Finland	Tampere Stadium	N/A
North America
August 4, 2012^{[H]}	Chicago	United States	Petrillo Music Shell	N/A
August 11, 2012	Los Angeles	United States	Staples Center	Off!
August 12, 2012	Los Angeles	United States	Staples Center	Off!
August 14, 2012	Oakland	United States	Oracle Arena	N/A
August 15, 2012	Oakland	United States	Oracle Arena	N/A
Europe / Middle East
August 25, 2012^{[I]}	Gelsenkirchen	Germany	Veltins-Arena	N/A
August 27, 2012	Prague	Czech Republic	Synot Tip Arena	N/A
August 29, 2012	Zagreb	Croatia	Zagreb Hippodrome	2Cellos
August 31, 2012	Bucharest	Romania	Arena Națională	Grimus
September 1, 2012	Sofia	Bulgaria	Armeets Arena	N/A
September 4, 2012	Athens	Greece	Olympic Stadium	N/A
September 6, 2012	Beirut	Lebanon	Beirut Waterfront	N/A
September 8, 2012	Istanbul	Turkey	SantralIstanbul Amphitheatre	Athena (band)
September 10, 2012	Tel Aviv	Israel	Hayarkon Park	Riff Cohen
North America
September 23, 2012	San Diego	United States	Valley View Casino Center	Band of Skulls; Janelle Monae
September 25, 2012	Glendale	United States	Jobing.com Arena	Band of Skulls; Janelle Monae
September 27, 2012	Denver	United States	Pepsi Center	Band of Skulls; Janelle Monae
September 29, 2012	San Antonio	United States	AT&T Center	Band of Skulls; Janelle Monae
October 2, 2012	Dallas	United States	American Airlines Center	Band of Skulls; Janelle Monae
October 4, 2012	New Orleans	United States	New Orleans Arena	Band of Skulls; Janelle Monae
October 14, 2012^{[J]}	Austin	United States	Zilker Metropolitan Park	Festival Show
October 20, 2012	Houston	United States	Toyota Center	Thundercat; Janelle Monae
October 22, 2012	Oklahoma City	United States	Chesapeake Energy Arena	Thundercat; Janelle Monae
October 23, 2012	Tulsa	United States	BOK Center	Thundercat; Janelle Monae
October 25, 2012	North Little Rock	United States	Verizon Arena	Thundercat; Janelle Monae
October 27, 2012	Kansas City	United States	Sprint Center	Thundercat; Janelle Monae
October 28, 2012	Omaha	United States	CenturyLink Center Arena	Thundercat; Janelle Monae
October 30, 2012	Minneapolis	United States	Target Center	Thundercat; Janelle Monae
November 1, 2012	Milwaukee	United States	BMO Harris Bradley Center	Thundercat; Janelle Monae
November 14, 2012	Portland	United States	Rose Garden	Rebirth Brass Band
November 15, 2012	Seattle	United States	KeyArena	Rebirth Brass Band
November 17, 2012	Vancouver	Canada	Rogers Arena	Rebirth Brass Band
November 19, 2012	Calgary	Canada	Scotiabank Saddledome	Rebirth Brass Band
November 21, 2012	Edmonton	Canada	Rexall Place	Rebirth Brass Band
November 22, 2012	Edmonton	Canada	Rexall Place	Rebirth Brass Band
November 24, 2012	Saskatoon	Canada	Credit Union Centre	Rebirth Brass Band
November 26, 2012	Winnipeg	Canada	MTS Centre	Rebirth Brass Band
December 18, 2012	Las Vegas	United States	Red Rock Amphitheatre	
December 31, 2012	Las Vegas	United States	Chelsea Ballroom	
Oceania
January 14, 2013	Auckland	New Zealand	Vector Arena	Gary Clark Jr.
January 15, 2013	Auckland	New Zealand	Vector Arena	Off!
January 18, 2013^{[K]}	Sydney	Australia	Sydney Showground Stadium	
January 20, 2013^{[K]}	Gold Coast	Australia	Parklands Gold Coast	
January 25, 2013^{[K]}	Adelaide	Australia	Adelaide Showgrounds	
January 26, 2013^{[K]}	Melbourne	Australia	Flemington Racecourse	
January 28, 2013^{[K]}	Perth	Australia	Claremont Showground	
Africa
February 2, 2013	Johannesburg	South Africa	FNB Stadium	
February 5, 2013	Cape Town	South Africa	Cape Town Stadium	
North America
March 3, 2013	Guadalajara	Mexico	Arena VFG	
March 5, 2013	Mexico City	Mexico	Palacio de los Deportes	
March 6, 2013	Mexico City	Mexico	Palacio de los Deportes	
March 9, 2013^{[L]}	Guatemala City	Guatemala	Estadio Mateo Flores	
April 9, 2013	Los Angeles	United States	The Fonda Theatre	
April 14, 2013^{[M]}	Indio	United States	Empire Polo Club	
April 21, 2013^{[M]}	Indio	United States	Empire Polo Club	

Festivals and other miscellaneous performances

^{A} This concert was a part of "Rock in Rio"
^{B} This concert was a part of "MTV World Stage"
^{C} This concert was a part of the "Hangout Music Festival"
^{D} This concert was a part of the "Bonnaroo Music Festival"
^{E} This concert was a part of "Rock Werchter"
^{F} This concert was a part of the "Heineken Jammin' Festival"
^{G} This concert was a part of "Rock in Rio Madrid"

^{H} This concert is a part of "Lollapalooza"
^{I} This concert is a part of "Rock im Pott"
^{J} This concert is a part of the "Austin City Limits Music Festival"
^{K} These concerts were a part of "Big Day Out"
^{L} This concert is a part of the "Tigo Fest"
^{M} This concerts is a part of the "Coachella Valley Music and Arts Festival"

Cancellations and rescheduled shows

January 20, 2012	Sunrise, Florida	BankAtlantic Center	Rescheduled to April 2, 2012
January 21, 2012	Orlando, Florida	Amway Center	Rescheduled to March 31, 2012
January 23, 2012	Tampa, Florida	Tampa Bay Times Forum	Rescheduled to March 29, 2012
January 25, 2012	Charlotte, North Carolina	Time Warner Cable Arena	Rescheduled to April 6, 2012
January 27, 2012	Raleigh, North Carolina	RBC Center	Rescheduled to April 4, 2012. By the time of the rescheduled concert, the venue had been renamed to PNC Arena.
January 28, 2012	Columbia, South Carolina	Colonial Life Arena	Rescheduled to April 7, 2012
January 30, 2012	Duluth, Georgia	Arena at Gwinnett Center	Rescheduled to April 10, 2012
January 31, 2012	Greensboro, North Carolina	Greensboro Coliseum	Rescheduled to April 9, 2012
February 3, 2012	Memphis, Tennessee	FedExForum	Rescheduled to April 12, 2012
February 4, 2012	New Orleans, Louisiana	New Orleans Arena	Rescheduled to October 4, 2012
February 17, 2012	Oakland, California	Oracle Arena	Rescheduled to August 14, 2012
February 18, 2012	Oakland, California	Oracle Arena	Rescheduled to August 15, 2012
February 26, 2012	Los Angeles, California	Staples Center	Rescheduled to August 11, 2012
February 26, 2012	Los Angeles, California	Staples Center	Rescheduled to August 12, 2012
February 29, 2012	San Diego, California	Valley View Casino Center	Rescheduled to September 23, 2012
March 2, 2012	Glendale, Arizona	Jobing.com Arena	Rescheduled to September 25, 2012
March 4, 2012	Denver, Colorado	Pepsi Center	Rescheduled to September 27, 2012
March 6, 2012	San Antonio, Texas	AT&T Center	Rescheduled to September 29, 2012
March 8, 2012	Houston, Texas	Toyota Center	Rescheduled to October 20, 2012
March 9, 2012	Dallas, Texas	American Airlines Center	Rescheduled to October 2, 2012
March 13, 2012	Tulsa, Oklahoma	BOK Center	Rescheduled to October 24, 2012
March 15, 2012	Oklahoma City, Oklahoma	Chesapeake Energy Center	Rescheduled to October 22, 2012
March 16, 2012	North Little Rock, Arkansas	Verizon Arena	Rescheduled to October 25, 2012
October 24, 2012	Tulsa, Oklahoma	BOK Center	Rescheduled to October 23, 2012

=== Box office score data ===
Venue	City	Tickets sold / available	Gross revenue
Simón Bolívar Park	Bogotá	19,654 / 25,000 (79%)	$2,283,360
Estadio Nacional de Costa Rica	San José	20,716 / 23,300 (89%)	$1,206,870
Estadio Nacional	Lima	38,712 / 38,712 (100%)	$3,123,470
Arena Anhembi	São Paulo	27,267 / 28,900 (94%)	$2,676,920
The O_{2}	Dublin	12,594 / 12,594 (100%)	$1,045,210
The O_{2} Arena	London	48,181 / 49,779 (97%)	$3,668,430
Manchester Evening News Arena	Manchester	26,536 / 30,145 (88%)	$2,056,320
O_{2} World	Berlin	14,212 / 14,223 (~100%)	$1,325,720
Tampa Bay Times Forum	Tampa	10,643 / 11,409 (93%)	$621,987
Amway Center	Orlando	12,066 / 12,066 (100%)	$676,675
BankAtlantic Center	Sunrise	13,432 / 13,432 (100%)	$803,398
Arena at Gwinnett Center	Duluth	10,482 / 10,482 (100%)	$640,965
FedExForum	Memphis	13,021 / 13,021 (100%)	$661,688
Air Canada Centre	Toronto	31,192 / 31,192 (100%)	$1,808,540
Bell Centre	Montreal	15,493 / 16,375 (95%)	$933,947
Prudential Center	Newark	27,304 / 27,304 (100%)	$1,683,612
TD Garden	Boston	13,330 / 13,330 (100%)	$824,600
Verizon Center	Washington, D.C.	14,502 / 14,502 (100%)	$875,595
Scottrade Center	St. Louis	12,831 / 13,600 (94%)	$704,945
Van Andel Arena	Grand Rapids	11,021 / 11,176 (99%)	$632,398
Allstate Arena	Rosemont	14,587 / 14,587 (100%)	$839,447
Value City Arena	Columbus	9,731 / 12,500 (78%)	$555,089
U.S. Bank Arena	Cincinnati	10,147 / 12,000 (84%)	$542,727
KFC Yum! Center	Louisville	13,186 / 15,299 (86%)	$761,089
Staples Center	Los Angeles	30,162 / 30,162 (100%)	$1,642,426
Oracle Arena	Oakland	26,796 / 26,796 (100%)	$1,552,802
American Airlines Center	Dallas	14,145 / 14,145 (100%)	$763,141
New Orleans Arena	New Orleans	14,037 / 14,037 (100%)	$699,235
Chesapeake Energy Arena	Oklahoma City	8,342 / 10,200 (82%)	$424,830
BOK Center	Tulsa	10,542 / 10,800 (98%)	$533,854
Verizon Arena	North Little Rock	10,479 / 11,250 (93%)	$524,779
Sprint Center	Kansas City	12,606 / 12,606 (100%)	$698,360
CenturyLink Center Arena	Omaha	12,690 / 13,000 (98%)	$640,065
Target Center	Minneapolis	12,360 / 12,360 (100%)	$694,240
Bradley Center	Milwaukee	8,696 / 10,500 (83%)	$479,673
Rose Garden	Portland	9,689 / 9,887 (98%)	$489,084
Arena VFG	Guadalajara	12,374 / 12,388 (~100%)	$825,196
Palacio de los Deportes	Mexico City	41,038 / 41,118 (99%)	$2,192,159
The Fonda Theatre	Los Angeles	1,250 / 1,250 (100%)	$65,625
TOTAL		666,046 / 695,427 (96%)	$43,178,471

== Opening acts ==
- Foals (South America) (Europe—Leg 1, select dates)
- Femi Kuti & The Positive Force (Europe—Leg 1)
- Fool's Gold (Europe—Leg 1, select dates)
- The Vaccines (Europe—Leg 2, select dates)
- Sleigh Bells (North America—Leg 1, select dates)
- Little Dragon (North America—Leg 1, select dates)
- Santigold (North America—Leg 1, select dates)
- Band of Skulls (North America—Leg 2, select dates)
- Janelle Monáe (North America—Leg 2, select dates)
- Thundercat (North America—Leg 3, select dates)
- Rebirth Brass Band (North America—Leg 2, select dates)
- Son Batá (Bogotá)
- Chancho en Piedra (Santiago)
- Reverend and The Makers (Knebworth, Sunderland)
- The Wombats (Knebworth, Sunderland)
- Dizzee Rascal (Knebworth)
- The Futureheads (Sunderland)
- Noel Gallagher's High Flying Birds (Dublin)
- Tinariwen (Nijmegen, Paris)
- Gogol Bordello (Moscow)
- Off! (Los Angeles—August 12) (Auckland) (April 9, 2013 – Los Angeles)
- Triggerfinger (Nijmegen)
- 2Cellos (Zagreb)
- Grimus (Bucharest)
- Athena (Istanbul)
- Riff Cohen (Tel Aviv)
- Gary Clark Jr. (Auckland)
- Die Antwoord (Johannesburg, Cape Town)

== Broadcasts and recordings ==
Prior to the world tour and the date following the album's release the band gave a special full album performance (although minus one song) which was shown via-satellite throughout the world in movie theaters.

In November 2011, the band opened the website, LiveChiliPeppers.com which will feature live recordings of every full show from the band's tour beginning with the November 7, 2011 show for purchase. The shows are available in MP3 for $9.95 and ALAC and FLAC for $12.95. All shows will be available for pre-order and will be released 72 hours after the completion of each show. On March 29, 2012, the band released 2011 Live EP, a free five song MP3 download available only through their website. The performances on the EP, which were taken from the November 2011 European leg of the tour, were personally selected by Chad Smith. On July 1, 2014, 2012-13 Live EP was released for free through the band's website with another five songs selected by Smith.

== Critical reception ==
Robert Heller (Bloomberg Businessweek) was not pleased with the concert at The O_{2} Arena, giving the show one-and-one-half stars. He says, "Unfortunately, there's little flesh to these workouts. As anyone who has waded through 2006's 'Stadium Arcadium' album (only to realize there is a whole, full-length, second CD still to go) will attest, the song craft has its limitations. Too many numbers are structured with the sophistication of a toddler's Lego effort. The punch of the playing flabbily dissipates into the vast space of the O_{2}. A few songs, clustered at the end of the gig, buck the trend. A cover of Stevie Wonder's 'Higher Ground' thrashes with tension. The classic L.A. rock of 'Californication' soars, if not quite like the Eagles, then at least like a well-fed vulture. 'By the Way' is explosive. It isn’t quite enough".

While Jim Abbott (Orlando Sentinel) poked fun at the band's age, he gave a modest review of the show at the Amway Center. He comments, "On the opening 'Monarchy of Roses', the band overpowered the singing, with volume shifting wildly in a harsh sound mix. Fortunately, there was the other aspect of the band's concert appeal: a stage with mammoth vertical spotlight towers and a huge video screen to project hypnotic shapes, constellations and other diversions. It's hard to process that the band is among this year's inductees into the Rock and Roll Hall of Fame, an honor at which the group might’ve once thumbed its nose. With the shock of that milestone comes the realization that anyone around for almost 30 years has amassed a formidable catalog of songs".

For the show at the Air Canada Centre, Ben Rayner (Toronto Star) alluded to the band being "lucky". He says, "The Peppers are lucky enough, too, to court not one, but two, stubbornly faithful audiences through their middle years. Both crowds received a tip of the hat at the ACC on Friday, although the set list had a definite tilt toward the far more mannered and ordinary Peppers of recent memory". Scott Mervis (Pittsburgh Post-Gazette) gave the show at the Consol Energy Center a positive review, stating Flea was the highlight of the entire show. He continues, "From the moment they hit the stage, with the first of many mini-jam sessions, the Peppers were an instrumental powerhouse. They are essentially a funk power trio led by Flea, who, at 49, is still a rock 'n' roll animal unleashed on the stage. His bass was cranked to max volume and was the dominant instrument throughout the show, as it should be".

Despite the Value City Arena being half-filled, Kevin Joy (The Columbus Dispatch) felt the show was just as energetic as a stadium. He states, "Although their punkish, low-rent origins are long gone, the group's songs continue to share a connected — albeit mellowed — sensibility that recalls a distinct time and place. A high-tech video wall that spanned the stage as well as hanging screens reinforced the status upgrade resulting from 30-plus years in the business". Another glowing review came from Garin Pirnia (The Cincinnati Enquirer). She writes, "RHCP is a band that handles stadiums well, but it made me yearn to see them at a club show. They’re entertaining in any context, but sharing these moments with 20,000 people that could easily translate into a more-intimate club setting made me feel slightly disconnected. Bono's basically untouchable, but Flea and the guys seem like regular folks. How fun would it be to share a beer with them after a show"?

Kevin C. Johnson St. Louis Post-Dispatch felt the show at the Scottrade Center cemented the band's place in rock history. He explains, "After 'Give It Away', which spiraled into a long instrumental featuring everyone but Kiedis, Flea (who at one point walked across the stage on his hands) thanked the crowd for 30 years of love, warmth and encouragement. He made a plea to fans to continue to always support live music. The action was captured not only on a gargantuan video that spread across the width of the stage, but eight smaller screens that moved around and at one point stretched out like a series of accordions".

== Fandemonium ==
In November 2014, the band released the book, Fandemonium. During the tour, Kiedis went to photographer David Mushegain and asked him to photograph and interview the band's fans at each concert throughout the world tour. The book features photographs and interviews conducted by Mushegain with fans of all ages throughout the world.

== Personnel ==
- Flea – bass, backing vocals, piano
- Anthony Kiedis – lead vocals
- Josh Klinghoffer – guitar, backing vocals, six-string bass, drums/percussion, banjo
- Chad Smith – drums, percussion

=== Additional musicians ===
- Mauro Refosco – percussion
- Chris Warren – keyboards

=== Guest musicians ===
- Keith "Tree" Barry – saxophone (11/21/11 marked Barry's first performance with the band in 21 years. Barry performed on "Did I Let You Know")
- Michael Bulger – trumpet, piano (Teacher at Flea's Silverlake school. Performed with the band at a few warm up dates including the August 30, 2011 full album show)
- Femi Kuti – saxophone (Joined band onstage during their encore performance of "Give It Away" and "Did I Let You Know" [Stockholm Only])
- Toots Hibbert – vocals (Performed with the band on their cover of "Louie Louie" at 2011 New Year's Eve show)
- Brandon Westgate – saxophone (Member of Fool's Gold. Performed with the band on "Did I Let You Know")
- Jack Irons – drums (band's original drummer joined them on "Give It Away" at HOF inductions and on August 12, 2012)
- Cliff Martinez – drums (band's second drummer joined them on "Give It Away" at HOF inductions and on August 12, 2012)
- 2Cellos (joined the band on "Californication" during their August 29, 2012 show)
- İlhan Erşahin – saxophone (joined the band for their performance of "Did I Let You Know" during their September 8, 2012 show and in Rio de Janeiro, September 11, 2013)
- Avishai Cohen – trumpet (joined the band for their performance of "The Power of Equality" during their September 10, 2012 show)
- Thundercat – (opening act joined band for "Give it Away" during November 1, 2012 show)
- Chad – (trumpet player for Rebirth Brass Band joined the band for "Did I Let You Know" during November 17, 2012 show)

== Notes ==
1. Data is gathered from concerts (and non-festival shows) held between November 9, 2011 through November 13, 2012.
2. Data is gathered from concerts (and non-festival shows) held between January 1, 2012 through December 31, 2012.
