= I'm with You World Tour (EP) =

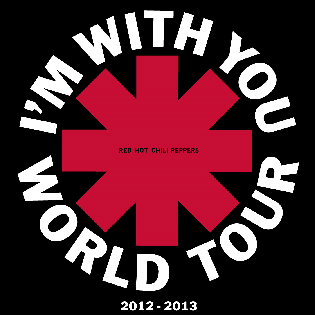

EP by Red Hot Chili Peppers
- Released: July 1, 2014
- Recorded: 2012–2013
- Genre: Funk rock; alternative rock
- Length: 24:32

Red Hot Chili Peppers chronology
I'm Beside You (2013)	I'm with You World Tour (2014)	Cardiff, Wales: 6/23/04 (2015)

I'm with You World Tour 2012–13 is a live EP by American rock band Red Hot Chili Peppers, released in 2014 through their website as a free MP3 download. As a way to celebrate the culmination of the band's I'm with You World Tour, Chad Smith personally selected five of his favorite performances from select dates tour for fans to download for free.

Throughout the I'm with You Tour and the follow-up 2013/2014 Tour, 72 hours after each show's completion, the band has been releasing an official bootleg of each show to their website for fans to purchase as a download.

== Track listing ==
All tracks are written by Anthony Kiedis, Flea, Chad Smith and John Frusciante.

No.	Title	Length
1.	"Breaking the Girl" (5/7/12 - Boston, MA)	5:20
2.	"Wet Sand" (4/10/12 - Duluth, GA)	5:13
3.	"Snow (Hey Oh)" (2/2/13 - Johannesburg, South Africa)	5:36
4.	"The Power of Equality" (7/5/12 - Milan, Italy)	4:03
5.	"Strip My Mind" (5/4/12 - Newark, NJ)	4:17
Total length:		24:32

== Personnel ==
Red Hot Chili Peppers

- Anthony Kiedis – lead vocals
- Josh Klinghoffer – guitar, backing vocals
- Flea – bass, backing vocals
- Chad Smith – drums, percussion

Additional musicians

- Mauro Refosco – percussion
- Chris Warren – keyboards
