= Brendan's Death Song =

Single by Red Hot Chili Peppers

from the album I'm with You
- Released: June 11, 2012
- Recorded: 2010–2011
- Genre: Alternative rock, acoustic rock
- Length: 5:38 (album version); 3:29 (radio/video edit)
- Label: Warner Bros.
- Songwriters: Anthony Kiedis, Flea, Chad Smith, Josh Klinghoffer
- Producer: Rick Rubin

Red Hot Chili Peppers singles chronology
"Look Around" (2012)	"Brendan's Death Song" (2012)	"Dark Necessities" (2016)

Music video
- "Brendan's Death Song" on YouTube

"Brendan's Death Song" is a song by the Red Hot Chili Peppers from their 2011 album I'm with You and was released as the album's fourth and final single on June 11, 2012 through digital download. A two-track CD single was released in Germany on August 24, 2012.

== Song background ==
The song is about Brendan Mullen, founder of The Masque, a small punk rock club which was an important part of the early Los Angeles punk scene. Mullen was also a longtime friend of the Chili Peppers and one of the first music promoters to give the band their start. In 1983, Anthony and Flea had a demo tape and took it to a popular L.A. club, Club Lingerie. There they had their first encounter with Mullen, who was the booker for the club. They played Mullen their tape while they danced around to the song for an opening spot for the Bad Brains, who were an influence to the band and kings of the punk rock scene at the time. Many years later Mullen was working with Blackie Dammett on the Chili Peppers biography, Red Hot Chili Peppers: An Oral/Visual History when he died suddenly after suffering a stroke in 2009 and was unable to complete work on the book though it eventually was finished by Mullen's long-time companion Kateri Butler and designer/musician John Curry, who had been friends with Brendan since the Masque days and was a member of The Flyboys. The book was released in 2010. Flea responded to Mullen's passing by writing a two-page article in the Los Angeles Times.

According to a July 2011 interview with singer Anthony Kiedis, Mullen died on the first day of rehearsals for the album. Kiedis said he received a text message about the death and he informed the band when he got to rehearsals. Without talking, the band quickly started to play music and the jam, which was the basis for the song, came right away. Kiedis stated that the song has the feel of a death march but ultimately "the song is more of a celebration than a bummer." Kiedis describes his favorite part of the song being the bridge, which is much darker and there is a feeling of falling into the unknown abyss of dying. The guitarist Josh Klinghoffer described the song as being part acoustic mourning, part galloping hard-rock send-off.

Despite getting no radio airplay, fans voted the song tenth best of the year in the Rolling Stone Top 10 Reader's Poll of 2011. In an interview with Billboard, published March 6, 2012, Chad Smith announced the song would be the band's next single.

== Structure ==
The song is written in 4/4, beginning with an acoustic guitar introduction, which is then sung over by vocalist Anthony Kiedis. The song gradually builds, introducing electric guitars, drums, and bass, reaching full instrumentation in the first chorus. The drumbeat makes heavy use of tom-tom drums. In the chorus following the bridge, bassist Flea plays an improvised melodic bassline. The song ends with the chorus structure being repeated several times, while Flea and Chad Smith solo over it.

== Music video ==
The video was directed by Marc Klasfeld, who also directed the music videos for "The Adventures of Rain Dance Maggie" and "Monarchy of Roses". The band shot scenes for the video in New Orleans on May 21, 2012 and through their website, invited fans to be part of the video by sending in their photo and information.

The main concept for the video was to shoot it in a Jazz Funeral style, which involved musicians playing in a marching band formation throughout the funeral procession. In the first part of the video the funeral band plays as the Red Hot Chili Peppers perform while being driven along on a black Ford Pickup Truck Hearse. The final act of the video sees the band performing at McDonoghville Cemetery in Louisiana, where they perform against a backdrop of burning letters that reads “Death Song”.

The video made its premiere on June 28, 2012 at rollingstone.com. The length of the song in the video version is edited by over 2 minutes compared to the album version. On August 16, 2012, the full-length music video was released.

== Live performances and promotion ==
Despite being a single, the song has only been performed four times live with Kiedis often struggling on some of the lyrics.

== Formats and track listings ==
Radio promo single

1. "Brendan's Death Song" (radio edit)

Promo single

1. "Brendan's Death Song" (album version)
2. "Brendan's Death Song" (radio edit)
3. "Brendan's Death Song" (instrumental)

German single

1. "Brendan's Death Song"
2. "Goodbye Hooray" (live; recorded on May 2, 2012 in Bell Centre, Montreal)

== Personnel ==
Red Hot Chili Peppers

- Anthony Kiedis – lead vocals
- Josh Klinghoffer – guitar, backing vocals
- Flea – bass
- Chad Smith – drums

Additional musicians

- Lenny Castro – percussion

== Use in media ==
Portions of the song can be heard on Top Gear's India Special.
