= I Am with You =

I Am with You may refer to:

- I Am with You (1943 film), a French musical comedy film
- I Am with You (1948 film), a Swedish drama film

== See also ==
- I'm with You (disambiguation)
