= Look Around (song) =

Single by Red Hot Chili Peppers

from the album I'm with You
- Released: January 25, 2012
- Recorded: 2010–2011
- Genre: Funk rock; alternative rock; rap rock
- Length: 3:28
- Label: Warner Bros.
- Songwriters: Anthony Kiedis, Flea, Chad Smith, Josh Klinghoffer
- Producer: Rick Rubin

Red Hot Chili Peppers singles chronology
"Monarchy of Roses" (2011)	"Look Around" (2012)	"Brendan's Death Song" (2012)

Music video
- "Look Around" on YouTube

"Look Around" is a song by the American rock band Red Hot Chili Peppers, taken from their tenth studio album I'm with You (2011). It is the album's third single and the music video was released on January 25, 2012. On the band's website, however, it leaked a day early. The song is available for download on iTunes and a two track promo single was released, but no other info on a proper CD single has been released.

On December 2, 2011, drummer Chad Smith confirmed "Look Around" as the next single when he posted a photo on his Twitter page of his drum set and a toilet saying it was from the "Look Around" video. Robert Hales directed video pans four different rooms, each containing a member of the band.

== Background and composition ==
"Look Around" was written by Anthony Kiedis, Flea, Chad Smith, Josh Klinghoffer and produced by Rick Rubin. It focuses on social commentary about the planet. In the song, the vocalist falls in love with a stripper, explaining "Hustle here/ Hustle there/ Hustle me bitch and you best beware/ It's emotional/ And I told you so." The outro of "Look Around," harkens memories of Californication opener "Around the World". Thomas Nassiff from Absolute Punk wrote that the outro "is a cluster of musicianship complemented by Kiedis’ familiar rap-ish vocals." Over a "green-mohawked mirror-ball boogie", Kiedis rock-raps a vision of golden rapture: "Soft walk to horizon/One big crash that no one dies in."

== Critical reception ==
Jason Newman in his Billboard track-by-track review, commented: "The album's most exuberant track, handclaps accentuate Smith's bouncy rhythms as Kiedis raps like it's 1989. That's a good thing. This is the one the crowd'll jump around to live." Jon Dolan from Rolling Stone wrote that the song "balance swagger and sensitivity. It's the apocalypse as beach blowout, the meltdown as brodown." Mikael Wood wrote for Spin that the song is "a scratchy, festive tune set in a strip club, to take a 'long hard look at my last decision'." Rick Florino from Artist Direct described the song as "an up-tempo sunny rocker complete with handclaps at all the right times." Daniel Tebo from PopMatters wrote that "the unabashedly sleazy 'Look Around' remind fans that Flea is the world’s mightiest bassist and that Kiedis is probably the most insufferable lyricist of all time." The Sputnikmusic staff review called it "funky and fun". Ron Hart from Blurt commented: "Anthony getting funky on the mic like an old batch of collard greens with his famously non-linear lyricism, skip directly to the likes of 'Look Around' and 'Even You Brutus,' where he appears to be emulating the delivery of Slug from Atmosphere on a jam that could be the older, wiser relative of 'Sir Psycho Sexy'." Lewis Corner wrote for Digital Spy that the song is "bombastic, sounding like a heavily refined version of their 1992 hit 'Suck My Kiss' melded with the lyrical intonations of 2002's 'By the Way'."

== Music video ==
On December 5, 2011, Flea announced that the band's work on the video was completed. He posted on his Twitter page "We made a video for Look Around the other day very excited about it, it was the funnest shoot ever." On January 17, 2012, the band released a behind the scenes video for "Look Around" exclusively for those who download their free smartphone application.

The video shows each band member in four different rooms to reflect their own personalities. Almost all the props and artwork in the video are from each band member's personal collection. In Anthony's room, model Charlotte Free, his dog and his son Everly are featured. Flea is seen in his room dancing around in his underwear with then girlfriend, Sandha Khin, also in her underwear. Chad's room is a bathroom where his seat is a toilet and there is also a punching bag. Josh's room is very empty with just a table and lamp.

The video was directed by Robert Hales with Alejandro Lalinde as director of photography. The music video was nominated for Most Innovative Video at MTV's O Awards. Fans could vote for the video through the awards website.

== Live performances and promotion ==
The song was performed at nearly every show on the I'm with You World Tour and was performed occasionally on The Getaway World Tour. The song was also briefly featured in a commercial for the Simon Cowell show, The X Factor.

== Formats and track listings ==
UK promo single

1. "Look Around" (album version) – 3:28
2. "Look Around" (radio edit) – 3:28

For the first time ever since "Mother's Milk", there was no retail release for a single.

== Personnel ==
Red Hot Chili Peppers

- Anthony Kiedis – lead vocals
- Josh Klinghoffer – guitar, backing vocals
- Flea – bass guitar
- Chad Smith – drums

Additional musicians

- Mauro Refosco – percussion
- Money Mark – Hammond B-3 organ

== Charts ==
=== Weekly charts ===
Chart (2012)	Peak position
Belgium (Ultratip Bubbling Under Flanders)	25
Belgium (Ultratip Bubbling Under Wallonia)	21
Canada Hot 100 (Billboard)	85
Canada Rock (Billboard)	2
Hungary (Rádiós Top 40)	29
US Alternative Airplay (Billboard)	8
US Mainstream Rock (Billboard)	12
US Hot Rock & Alternative Songs (Billboard)	11

=== Year-end charts ===
Chart (2012)	Position
US Hot Rock & Alternative Songs (Billboard)	37
