= Did I Let You Know =

Promotional single by Red Hot Chili Peppers

from the album I'm with You
- Released: January 2012
- Recorded: 2010–2011
- Genre: Alternative rock; Bossa nova
- Length: 4:21
- Label: Warner Bros.
- Songwriters: Anthony Kiedis; Flea; Chad Smith; Josh Klinghoffer
- Producer: Rick Rubin

Music video
- "Did I Let You Know" on YouTube

"Did I Let You Know" is a song from the Red Hot Chili Peppers' 2011 album I'm with You and was released in January 2012 as a radio-only single exclusively in Brazil.

On December 13, 2011, the band released a statement on their Brazilian website saying due to the song getting heavy radio airplay in Brazil and the song winning a poll voted on by the fans they decided to make it the next single there. This is the first single chosen by the fans.

== Music video ==
Although not officially released by the band, in response to being allowed to select the song as a single, a music video was released on March 9, 2012 and created by a group of Brazilian fans. The video has since been endorsed by Warner Brazil. The music video is inspired by the album's artwork along with the websites lettheflyknow.com and amoscasabe.com. Through the project “A Mosca Sabe” (The Fly Knows) fans from all over the country were selected to be part of the video. The devoted fans then got together in the city of Rio de Janeiro to shoot the video. Chad Smith and Josh Klinghoffer responded to the video with Smith saying "The Did I Let You Know video. Made by our Brazilian fans is very cool! I love it! Thanks so much!” while Klinghoffer responded by saying “I just wanted to say that the smiles on all of those beautiful faces and the love that is very clear throughout that video made me a very, very happy camper.”

MTV Brasil aired the video on Monday March 19, 2012 on the show, Acesso MTV and interview those that helped create it.

== Personnel ==
=== Red Hot Chili Peppers ===
- Anthony Kiedis – lead vocals
- Josh Klinghoffer – guitar, backing vocals
- Flea – bass
- Chad Smith – drums

=== Additional musicians ===
- Mike Bulger – trumpet
- Mauro Refosco – percussion
