= Monarchy of Roses =

Single by Red Hot Chili Peppers

from the album I'm with You
- Released: October 7, 2011
- Recorded: 2010–2011
- Genre: Funk rock; pop rock; garage rock; disco
- Length: 4:14 (album version); 3:43 (UK radio edit)
- Label: Warner Bros.
- Songwriters: Anthony Kiedis, Flea, Chad Smith, Josh Klinghoffer
- Producer: Rick Rubin

Red Hot Chili Peppers singles chronology
"The Adventures of Rain Dance Maggie" (2011)	"Monarchy of Roses" (2011)	"Look Around" (2012)

Music video
- "Monarchy of Roses" on YouTube

"Monarchy of Roses" is a song from the Red Hot Chili Peppers' 2011 album I'm with You and the album's second single. The single is the follow-up to "The Adventures of Rain Dance Maggie". The single was released to radio and for download in the UK on October 7, 2011, and to radio in the United States on October 25, 2011.

In a September 17, 2011 interview on BBC Radio 2 with Anthony Kiedis and Chad Smith, the show's host, Justin Lee Collins broke the news that "Monarchy of Roses" would be the second single from the album and would be released on November 14, 2011. Neither Kiedis or Smith were even aware what song would be the next single and both seemed surprised during the interview. Despite the same date being also listed on the back of the promo single, the song was released weeks earlier to radio; however, the music video was, in fact, released on this date.

== Music video ==
On October 4, 2011, the band began filming a music video for Monarchy of Roses. Drummer Chad Smith posted a photo of his drums in front of a green screen confirming that filming was underway.

The video was directed by Marc Klasfeld, who previously directed the video for "The Adventures of Rain Dance Maggie" and was inspired by the art work of Raymond Pettibon.

Pettibon, who is the brother of Black Flag guitarist Greg Ginn, is best known for his artwork for the Black Flag albums as well as the band's iconic four bars logo. Flea said of Pettibon that he has been a fan since he was a teenager and that his art was first seen as part of the hardcore punk rock scene in LA around 1980. Pettibon has since gone on to have a "transcendently beautiful and dynamic art career. Raymond Pettibon means a lot to us and we are honored to have made this collaboration with him."

On November 30, 2011, the band released a behind the scenes video of the making of "Monarchy of Roses".

== Reception ==
Billboard calls the song a "mixed bag of new ideas" and that the band "hurt as much as they delight" with this song. Loudwire gave the song 4 out of 5 stars, commenting that the song is "structured around a tightly wound tension and release formula". They conclude that the song "has a real stadium (arcadium) feel to it, as it invites plenty of singalongs with its layers of harmony".

== Live performances and promotion ==
"Monarchy of Roses" was performed at every show on the I'm with You World Tour as the opening song, but has not been performed on any subsequent tours.

Even though for many years the band has strongly fought against having their music used in commercials or other promotional advertisements, "Monarchy of Roses" appeared in a 2011 Japanese car commercial for the Nissan Elgrand.

== Formats and track listings ==
Japanese single

1. "Monarchy of Roses" (album version) – 4:14

UK promo single

1. "Monarchy of Roses" (album version) – 4:14
2. "Monarchy of Roses" (radio edit) – 3:43
3. "Monarchy of Roses" (instrumental) – 4:12

European advance promo single

1. "Monarchy of Roses" (album version) – 4:14
2. "Monarchy of Roses" (radio edit) – 3:43

== Personnel ==
Red Hot Chili Peppers

- Anthony Kiedis – lead vocals
- Josh Klinghoffer – guitar, backing vocals, synthesizer
- Flea – bass
- Chad Smith – drums

Additional musicians

- Mauro Refosco – percussion
- Lenny Castro – additional percussion

== Charts ==
=== Weekly charts ===
Chart (2011–2012)	Peak position
Belgium (Ultratip Bubbling Under Flanders)	18
Belgium (Ultratip Bubbling Under Wallonia)	11
Canada Rock (Billboard)	5
Japan (Japan Hot 100)	31
US Alternative Airplay (Billboard)	4
US Mainstream Rock (Billboard)	16
US Hot Rock & Alternative Songs (Billboard)	7

=== Year-end charts ===
Chart (2012)	Position
US Hot Rock & Alternative Songs (Billboard)	39
