= I'm with You (album) =

Studio album by Red Hot Chili Peppers
- Released: August 26, 2011
- Recorded: September 14, 2010 – March 18, 2011
- Studios: EastWest (Los Angeles, California); Shangri-La (Malibu, California)
- Genres: Funk rock; alternative rock
- Length: 59:15
- Label: Warner Bros.
- Producer: Rick Rubin

Red Hot Chili Peppers chronology
Stadium Arcadium (2006)	I'm with You (2011)	Official Bootlegs (2011)

Singles from I'm with You
- 1. "The Adventures of Rain Dance Maggie" Released: July 18, 2011; 2. "Monarchy of Roses" Released: October 7, 2011; 3. "Look Around" Released: January 25, 2012; 4. "Brendan's Death Song" Released: June 11, 2012

I'm with You is the tenth studio album by the American rock band Red Hot Chili Peppers. The album was released by Warner Bros. Records on August 26, 2011, in Europe and on August 29, 2011, in the United States. The album made its debut at number one in 18 countries including the United Kingdom, while reaching number two in the United States and Canada.

Produced by Rick Rubin, I'm with You was the band's first studio album after a five-year hiatus, and the first to feature guitarist Josh Klinghoffer, following the departure of John Frusciante in 2009. It is also the first album since 1989's Mother's Milk to not have a title track. The album received mixed reviews, with many praising newcomer Josh Klinghoffer for breathing new life into the veteran group, but also criticizing John's Frusciante's absence from the group. The album featured four singles, including alternative number-one hit, "The Adventures of Rain Dance Maggie", "Monarchy of Roses", "Look Around" and "Brendan's Death Song". "Did I Let You Know" was released exclusively in Brazil thanks to response from a poll voted on by the fans, though it was not considered a proper single. A Rolling Stone Reader's Poll named I'm with You the 8th best album of 2011 and the album was also nominated for the Grammy Award for Best Rock Album.

== Background ==
In August 2007, at the close of the band's world tour in support of Stadium Arcadium (2006), the Peppers began a one-year hiatus, which subsequently stretched to more than two years. Bassist Flea stated, "I talked everyone into it and some people were more prone to it than others. [...] I just felt like I wanted to take two years away just to really look and see if the band was something we should still be doing. Things had gotten dysfunctional and not fun." During this time, Flea studied music theory at the University of Southern California, drummer Chad Smith recorded and toured with hard rock supergroup Chickenfoot, while guitarist John Frusciante recorded and released his 10th solo album, The Empyrean. According to vocalist Anthony Kiedis, there was a collective decision "not [to] do anything Red Hot Chili Peppers-related for a minimum of one year. [...] We started in 1999, with the writing and the recording of Californication, and we didn't really stop until the tour ended last year. We were all emotionally and mentally zapped at the end of that run." During the band's self-imposed hiatus, Frusciante departed from the band for a second time, stating, "There was no drama or anger involved, and the other guys were very understanding. They are supportive of my doing whatever makes me happy and that goes both ways." Regarding Frusciante's departure, Flea stated, "he just didn't want to do [the Red Hot Chili Peppers] anymore. He really wanted to do what he wants to do, on his own, without having to deal with the band dynamic, our band dynamic." Kiedis notes that, "John had become disenchanted with being in a touring rock band, which is completely understandable. He's a driven person in the world of music and sound, and he wanted to change gears."

Following Frusciante's departure, Kiedis stated that both he and Flea "had this intuitive feeling. We're not really done. We wanted to maintain the Red Hot Chili Peppers if we could do it in a way that upheld historically what we had accomplished. [...] There were some interesting conversations about, do we try to find someone we don't know, or maybe there is somebody right in our own backyard who is the perfect solution?" Flea commented on the band's eventual return stating, "For me, the biggest thing during the time off, and what really made me want to continue doing the band, specifically after John decided he didn't want to continue, [was] I just realized, Anthony, man, he's my brother, I love him so much, and we started this band when we were kids. I wanted to keep that going, I never want to let that go."

Frusciante was subsequently replaced by friend and frequent collaborator Josh Klinghoffer, who had been performing alongside the band during the final legs of the Stadium Arcadium tour. Regarding Klinghoffer's entry into the band, Smith noted, "We've known him a long time. He's super-talented, smart, handsome. He fits in perfectly, which is a good thing," and later stated: "We couldn't have asked for a better person to play music with." Klinghoffer noted, "I've always been attracted to the idea of a tight-knit unit, a band of family, a brotherhood. Since my earliest memory, they always seemed like a band with a lot of love for each other."

Joining the band in late 2009, Klinghoffer began writing and jamming with the band on October 12; the same day that friend and autobiographer Brendan Mullen died. According to Flea, "it was a poignant moment for us. It was an emotional thing." Klinghoffer notes that: "It was sort of a sad hello. Everybody lost a good friend."

Klinghoffer subsequently made his live debut with the band on January 29, 2010, performing a cover of the Neil Young song, "A Man Needs a Maid", at MusiCares event honouring Young. Prior to the event, Chad Smith noted, "it's the first time we've played out with Josh, just the four of us, so it'll be an exciting night for him. [...] We're taking it slow. One song at a time." Flea commented on Josh's impact on the band, saying that "over time he really revealed himself to be just the best person we could've got. And John Frusciante's such a powerful musician and left such an imprint on our band and gave so much as a writer, as a player, a serious part of our band, that no one could ever replace John. No one's ever going to step in and do what John did. But Josh came in and does what Josh does and does it in a beautiful way."

Kiedis noted, "There is no question – this is a beginning," with Smith confirming that statement by adding, "this is a new band. Same name, but it's a new band."

== Recording and production ==
The album was produced by Rick Rubin; in the same studio in which the band recorded Californication, and at Shangri La. The album's recording sessions took place from September 2010 to March 2011. According to Rubin, the band recorded enough material to release a second double album, following Stadium Arcadium (2006), but ultimately decided not to. Rubin notes, "it was painful not to share all of the material that we had, but we felt it would be too much. We really wanted it to be 12 songs but it ended up being 14 just because nobody could agree on which 12." Regarding the band's decision to work with Rubin once again, Chad Smith stated, "We have a great working relationship with him. He's been working with us for 20 years. We feel that he's the fifth Chili Pepper. He's someone that we love and trust."

I'm with You was claimed to be the first album specially mastered to optimize digital sound quality for iTunes Store customers who purchase the album through iTunes. The album was mastered using high-resolution sourced audio. Despite this, the mastering has been deemed extremely loud and over-compressed and therefore distorted, continuing the trend since One Hot Minute.

=== I'm with You sessions/album outtakes ===
In August 2012, the band began releasing additional songs from the I'm with You recording sessions. Nine singles featuring 17 songs were released, with the final coming out in July 2013. Each release contained two songs (except for one, "In Love Dying", which clocked in at 8:01) featuring an A-side and a B-side and were available on 7" vinyl and digital download. In late 2013, all 17 outtakes were released as a double LP titled I'm Beside You. Klinghoffer confirmed that some post session work was done as late as 2013 on the songs from I'm Beside You.

According to the band, around 50 songs were recorded during the album sessions. To date, 19 remain unreleased. Of those, Klinghoffer mentioned "Renaissance" as one of the titles and he even has teased it live. Alternate versions of songs also exist. "Look Around" is featured on Rock Band DLC with its original intro (which was also played live). An alternate version of "Ethiopia" that features a saxophone solo performed by Joshua Redman also exists and was mentioned in interviews prior to the album's release but that version remains unreleased. During recording process for the album, and as with every album, some of the songs had alternate working titles that were mentioned by the band in pre-release interviews. "Did I Let You Know" ("Take Me Home" and "Lagos"), "Police Station" ("Stolen Stone"), "Monarchy of Roses" ("Disco Sabbath"), "Goodbye Hooray" ("See You Around"), "Magpies on Fire" ("Magpies") and "Your Eyes Girl" ("Mormon Lover"). "Did I Let You Know" also had the suffix '(This I Know)' during some of the band's interviews.

== Writing and composition ==
Monarchy of Roses
"Monarchy of Roses" is the 2nd single and features elements of disco.

According to drummer Chad Smith, the band "wrote a lot of songs" during ten months, from October 12, 2009, to August 2010. Smith noted, "Every record is a real snapshot of where we're at during that time in our lives as a band and as a people. It's always been that way." Flea stated that the band wrote around 60–70 songs for the new album and writing took around nine months before they entered the studio with Rubin.

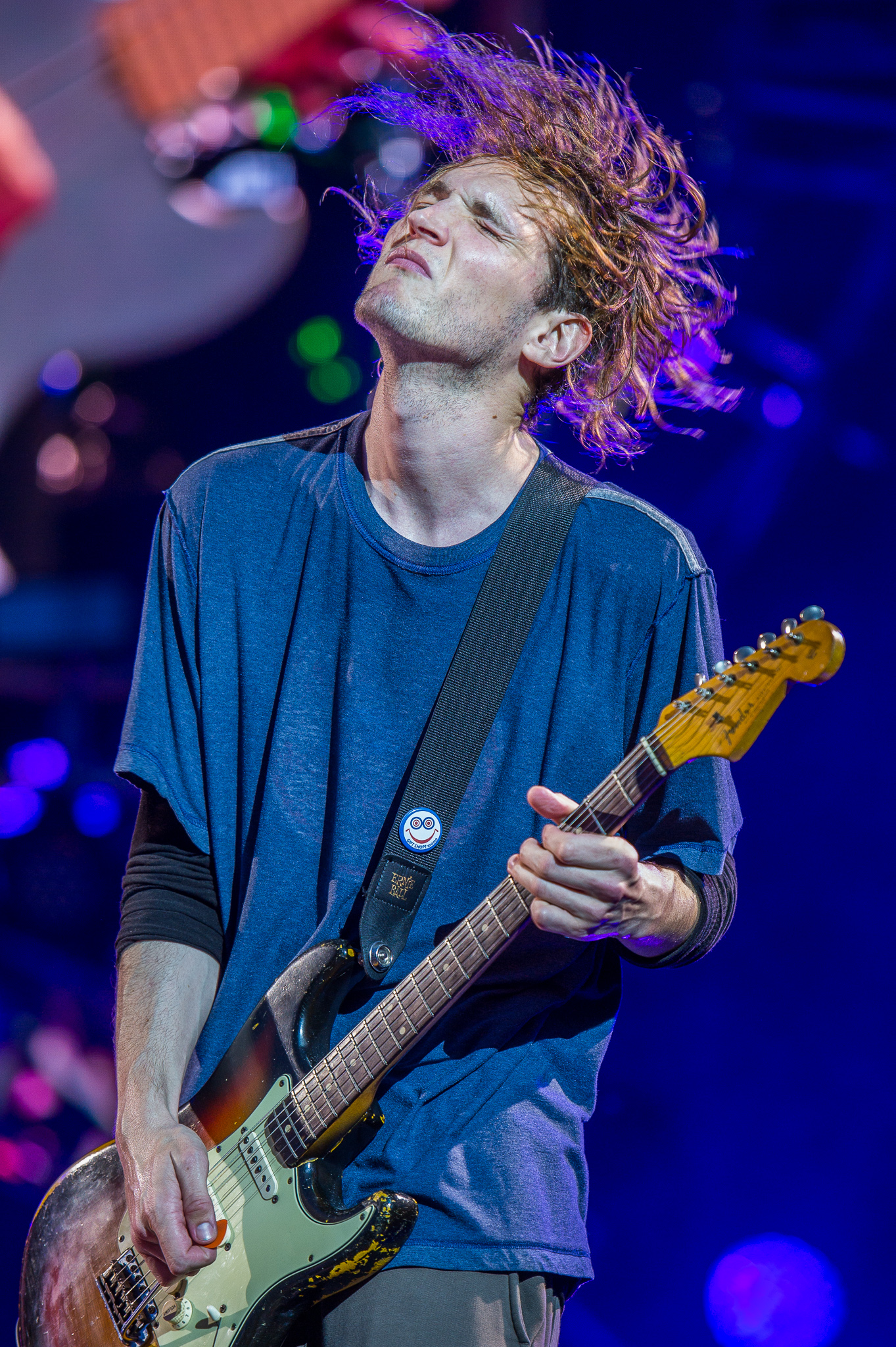
I'm With You was the first Red Hot Chili Peppers album with guitarist Josh Klinghoffer replacing John Frusciante.

Regarding the departure of guitarist John Frusciante, and the arrival of Josh Klinghoffer, vocalist Anthony Kiedis stated, prior to the album's release, "it is always going to change the chemistry and feeling of the music when such a creative force as John Frusciante leaves. He was something unique that shaped our sound then, but now I think it's also something fresh and exciting to have a new, incredible musical mind working with us now. We are still the Red Hot Chili Peppers, but we also have to adapt and welcome new opportunities. After all, that is how we've survived all these years." Producer Rick Rubin commented on Klinghoffer's addition to the band, stating, "Josh is fantastic. He played with John Frusciante for many, many years and he actually toured with the Chili Peppers before, so he's sort of part of the extended family. He's stylistically very close to John but has a completely different trip. It sounds like the Red Hot Chili Peppers that you've never heard before." Flea remarked, "Josh is a very subtle musician and it's not so much about the big riff – it's more subtle, sublime, poetic texture type of playing. We're just reacting to him, and it makes us play different, so we're just going a different way, and it's great. We still sound like the Red Hot Chili Peppers, but it's really a lot different."

Kiedis commented on the overall writing process, noting, "this album has been one of evolution. Before, some of our jams were a bit hit-and-miss. On this record, a decent number of songs were actually thought out and planned in a way we had never done before. That is, with Flea's new knowledge of music theory, we explored the writing process with a bit more precision." During the band's hiatus, Flea studied musical theory classes at the University of Southern California, learning piano during his tenure. According to Kiedis, Flea's piano contributions to I'm With You added "a whole new dynamic" to the band's sound. According to Flea, Klinghoffer also wrote songs on piano for the album: "I started writing songs on piano for this record and Josh also wrote songs on piano, so a lot of the songs were written on the piano and then translated to [the] rock band. It has a different kind of feeling, kind of more of a liquid, poetic feeling is the best way I can describe it."

Flea said the three main things he was listening to during the creation of the album were underground kind of avant-garde electronic music, The Rolling Stones, and Johann Sebastian Bach.

According to the band, "Brendan's Death Song" was the first song written for the album, with parts of "Annie Wants a Baby" written the same day. Album opener, "Monarchy of Roses", a darker song mixing funk and pop, was written and recorded under the working title, "Disco Sabbath". Other songs like "Did I Let You Know?" focus on social commentary about the planet while "Police Station" is a slow, emotional piece that tells a story of Kiedis running into various old friends throughout Los Angeles, all of whom had turned into down-on-their-luck, tragic figures. Kiedis reminisces about past times with these characters over a moody, complex chord progression from Klinghoffer. According to Kiedis, the final song written for the album was "Even You Brutus", written after the band stopped writing songs and was already in the recording studio. Flea came in and played a piece on the piano that the band felt they needed to turn into a song. "Dance, Dance, Dance" has been described as the most atmospheric and family-friendly song on the album.

According to Flea, "Life and death is a major theme of the album." Other themes in the album include the beginning of romantic relationships, hardship of poverty, quitting drug abuse, and the dashing of dreams and wishes.

During the writing process, Flea reportedly listened to the Rolling Stones' albums Exile on Main Street and Tattoo You frequently.

According to Flea, the album is, at times, influenced by African music. Flea stated, "We've always all loved African music. Throughout our career we've played some African bits, but we never really captured it right. Josh and I tripped around Ethiopia with a group called Africa Express, which Damon Albarn organized. We saw music every night and jammed with musicians. Ethiopia is such a great country, beautiful place. So there are a couple African parts on the new songs. One is called "Did I Let You Know", which has a real African feeling, and there's another called "Ethiopia". I'm really grateful to Damon for bringing me along. It really widened my scope of humanity." Chad Smith also commented on the album's African influences, stating his love of a compilation album, entitled The Afrosound of Colombia, and noting that the song, "Ethiopia", "puts a smile on my face."

== Packaging and title ==
During a June 2011 interview with Spin, Smith confirmed that controversial British artist Damien Hirst would design the album cover. On July 5, 2011, the cover artwork was released through the band's mailing list. Kiedis described the album's cover art, entirely white except for a fly perched on a capsule, by saying, "It's an image. It's art. Iconic. We didn't give it its meaning but it's clearly open to interpretation."

Flea's daughter, Clara Balzary, has been involved with taking promotional photos of the band leading up to the release of the new album. Most of the first shots of the new lineup were taken by Balzary, and her photography is featured in the album artwork.

In June 2011, cryptic themed street posters and artwork of a robot with the band's logo and 8/30/11 began appearing in various places around Los Angeles. At the time it was denied by the band's management that the artwork was released by the band or the album cover however on July 14, 2011, TMZ broke the news that the artwork has been endorsed by the band to promote the global release of the new album. The artist behind the work is Mr. Brainwash. Brainwash claims that his work with the band is not finished and he will be teaming up with them on several more projects.

The working title for the album was rumored to be Dr. Johnny Skinz's Disproportionately Rambunctious Polar Express Machine-Head. According to an early 2011 article in Spin Magazine, Kiedis said "[A friend] was reminiscing about one of his legendary acid trips, and told us that he had been playing a sold-out show to the planets and moons, and his number-one hit was, well, that title". Two months later the working title name was denied by producer Rick Rubin and Kiedis. Through his father, Kiedis told fans, don't believe the rumors. There was no friend, no acid trip and it was all a lie.

When it came time to decide on a title for the album, Kiedis started making lists of titles, though none seemed to capture the spirit of the record. He said they thought of naming it after a song on the album, but Rubin said that made it seem like the band did not have enough ideas. A day before the deadline to find a title, Klinghoffer wrote down the words "I'm with you" on a piece of paper and very subtly showed it to Kiedis and the rest of the band who fell in love with the title right away. Klinghoffer said the title came to him out of nowhere and explained, "It seems pretty open, pretty apropos to where the band is, what the band's doing, how the record wants to be related to, or related with." Kiedis said, "It's open, and there's not really a negative connotation. It's inviting. The first time I heard a non-one-of-us mention it, it gave me the best feeling you could imagine. Unbeknownst to me, the news [of the album's title] had hit the radio, and some kid came up to me and he shook my hand and he said, 'I'm with you!' And I was like, 'Why are you saying that? Where did you hear that?' He said, 'I'm with you!' And then I realized that he must've heard it on the radio or something, and it was just a great feeling." This is the first album since 1989's Mother's Milk not to feature a title track.

== Release and promotion ==
The band's official site held a global listening party on August 22, 2011, where they streamed the entire album. Various radio stations throughout the world began playing tracks on the same date leading up to the album's release. The full album was also made available to stream for free on the iTunes Store.

The band kicked off a string of promotional shows and appearances starting in August 2011. On August 30, 2011, the date following the album's release in the United States, the band performed the entire album (apart from "Even You Brutus?") in sequence at a via satellite worldwide theatrical event called Red Hot Chili Peppers Live: I'm With You.

Sports channel, ESPN and many of their programs featured songs from I'm with You during various clips, segments and commercials throughout the months of August and September. The NFL has also used the album's songs during football games mainly prior to commercial breaks or playing throughout the stadium during timeouts. In 2011, the U.S. version of the Simon Cowell reality show, The X Factor used "Look Around" as a theme to their earliest commercials to promote the show. The album's second single, "Monarchy of Roses" was used in a Japanese car commercial for the Nissan Elgrand.

In the United States, I'm with You debuted at number two on the Billboard 200 with 229,000 copies sold in its first week. The album entered the UK Albums Chart at number one on the strength of 71,000 units, becoming the band's fourth number one effort in the United Kingdom. With a tally of 28,000, the record opened on the Canadian Albums Chart at number two. Internationally, I'm with You debuted and peaked atop the charts in over ten countries.

== Critical reception ==
Professional ratings
Aggregate scores
Source	Rating
AnyDecentMusic?	6.0/10
Metacritic	63/100
Review scores
Source	Rating
AbsolutePunk	8/10
AllMusic	3.5/5 stars
Entertainment Weekly	A
Kerrang!	4/5 stars
The Los Angeles Times	1.5/4 stars
Q	3/5 stars
Rolling Stone	3.5/5 stars
Pitchfork	4.0/10
Spin	7/10
Uncut	3/5 stars

I'm with You received mixed reviews from music critics. At Metacritic, which assigns a normalized rating out of 100 to reviews from mainstream critics, the album received an average score of 63, based on 35 reviews, which indicates "generally favorable reviews". John Lewis of Uncut magazine released the first review of the album in said magazine's September 2011 issue. He rated the album 3 out of 5 stars in a generally favorable write-up, stating that although "listening to a playback of new RHCP album, I'm with You, one can definitely hear a John Frusciante-shaped hole in the proceedings", the album did have many great tracks. In particular, he cited the songs "Happiness Loves Company", "Even You Brutus?" and "Police Station" as some of the album's highlights. Despite all of this however, he alluded that the album lacked the overall quality of the band's material with John Frusciante, saying "Minus their star guitarist, the Chilis are a bit mild.". The second review of I'm with You was written by Amy Bangs of Rock Sound. In another positive review which saw the album achieve a rating of 7 out of 10, she felt that any "drastic departure from their mixture of rock and funk is a disservice to fans", although she went on to say that tracks such as "Monarchy of Roses", "Even You Brutus?" and "Did I Let You Know" show a more experimental take on the band's trademark sound, saying that the former "layers a fast-paced dance beat and electronic instrumentation over the top of Flea's characteristic bass lines and Anthony Kiedis' unmistakable vocals." Despite this, she wrote that "There's a familiar funk-inspired sound on "Ethiopia" and "Look Around"." She also claims that new guitarist Josh Klinghoffer's playing on the album avoids the complex playing of former guitarist John Frusciante, whilst also noting his contributions on keyboard. She felt that the album was, overall, a successful continuation of their trademark sound, while also an exploration of several styles new to the band.

In a similarly positive review, Q's Craig Mclean rated the album 3 stars out of 5. He hailed "Brendan's Death Song" as the album's best track, whilst posing a question about what he interpreted as more introspective lyrics from the band on tracks such as "Police Station" and "Meet Me at the Corner", asking "are Red Hot Chili Peppers suffering a sudden attack of level-headedness?".

Jon Dolan of Rolling Stone was also positive about the album, giving it a rating of 3.5 out of 5 stars and saying that "Josh Klinghoffer, who's worked with Beck and Gnarls Barkley, is well suited for giving old tricks new shape", describing his guitar playing as "textured" and "elusive". Dolan also acknowledged the band's influences from The Rolling Stones throughout the album by citing that the album's replacing of John Frusciante with Josh Klinghoffer could be compared to The Rolling Stones' replacing the late Brian Jones and returning to a more stripped down and basic sound formula.

One of the most positive reviews came from Artistdirect writer Rick Florino, who gave the album 5 stars out of 5. Florino calls I'm with You a masterpiece, the best record of their career and a rock record for the ages. Florino said "Police Station" is the most vibrantly visceral visual that the band has ever conjured and that the song paints a vivid portrait of loneliness and failure that's as tearjerkingly infectious as "Under the Bridge" but with another two decades of instrumental intricacy infused at heart.

However, not all critics were impressed with the album. The band's hometown newspaper, the Los Angeles Times, gave the album a fairly negative review, saying it was a mishmash, lacked a center, and often felt duct-taped together from various points in the band's career. Writer Randall Roberts stated that out of the 14-song album there is a good EP worth of songs and did praise the album's first single, 'The Adventures of Rain Dance Maggie' along with 'Brendan's Death Song', which he said are among the best songs of the band's career. Roberts ended his review by saying the rest of the songs are stuff that will probably sound just fine beneath NFL highlight reels but fails to gel when the volume is up and California 2011 beckons.

== Commercial performance ==
On August 10, 2011, the album's lead single, "The Adventures of Rain Dance Maggie", reached number one on the Billboard Alternative Songs chart. This milestone earned the band their 12th number-one single on the chart, extending their existing record for the most number-one singles in the history of the format. The single also reached number one on the Billboard Rock Songs chart giving them their first number one on this chart which was created in 2009. The single also reached number one on the Canadian Alternative chart.

Released on August 29, the album debuted at number two on the US Billboard 200, selling 228,926 copies in its first week. It reached number one in Argentina, Brazil, Croatia, the Czech Republic, Denmark, Finland, Germany, Ireland, Japan, South Korea, Mexico, the Netherlands, New Zealand, Poland, Spain, Switzerland, and the United Kingdom, and debuted at number two in Australia, Austria, Belgium, Canada, and France.

On November 29, 2011, the album was nominated for a 2012 Grammy Award for Best Rock Album. The awards show was held February 12, 2012. They lost to Foo Fighters' album Wasting Light.

Rolling Stone ranked "The Adventures of Rain Dance Maggie" the 50th best single in their Top 50 Singles of 2011, while the Reader's Poll named I'm with You the 8th best album of year, and "Brendan's Death Song" as named tenth best song of 2011.

As of May 2016, I'm with You has sold 1,700,000 copies worldwide with 574,000 copies being sold in the United States. By most estimates, sales for the album have been a disappointment especially compared to the band's previous album, Stadium Arcadium which went onto sell over eight million copies worldwide with two and a half million copies sold in the U.S.; currently the album is on pace to be the band's lowest selling album since signing with Warner in 1991 and lowest selling album since 1987's The Uplift Mofo Party Plan.

In December 2012, the band made Forbes' World's 25 Highest-Paid Musicians for 2012 list placing at number 19 and taking in $39 million for the album and tour to support it. The tour made $33,911,873 in 2012 which was ranked 15th on Billboard's annual Top 25 Tours list.

== Tour ==
In the spring of 2011 the band announced its first tour dates since 2007. On July 27, 2011, the band played its first show since August 2007 and first with Klinghoffer. The event was very private and only 300 people were allowed to attend. It was held on the lawn outside the Henry Miller Memorial Library in Big Sur, CA. The band played a mixture of new and older songs. Rick Rubin, David Fricke, Vincent Gallo and Beach Boy Al Jardine were in attendance along with many of Flea's neighbors, since his house is close to the library. They followed this show with two more secret shows in late July. The band played festivals in Asia as a warm-up to the official tour kick off in Colombia on September 11, 2011. Following the Latin American leg, the first European leg of the tour lasted until December 2011.

Flea said that he expected the tour to last "forever" while Kiedis stated when talking about the new album, "I can't wait to go out and play this." According to sound engineer, Dave Rat, the tour would last into 2013 and the band's schedule would be spent with three weeks on the road and two weeks off throughout the tour, a plan followed on previous tours. Percussionist, Mauro Refosco and keyboard player, Chris Warren have joined the band's touring lineup as backing musicians for the entire tour.

The band's first leg in North America in early 2012 was forced to be rescheduled until late March 2012 due to multiple foot injuries Kiedis suffered with since the Stadium Arcadium tour. Kiedis then had surgery on his foot. The first U.S. leg of the tour, which included stops in Canada, kicked off in March 2012 and ran to June, with the rest of the U.S. dates being added or made up from August to November 2012. During the first leg of the North American tour, the band was inducted into the Rock and Roll Hall of Fame. In March 2012, Chad Smith said the band planned to tour throughout the remainder of 2012 followed by dates in Australia, New Zealand and Africa scheduled for early 2013.

The tour was named 15th highest-grossing tour of 2012 by Billboard on its annual Top 25 list.

=== Official bootlegs ===
The band announced that they would start releasing official bootleg live downloads of full concerts from their current tour. The shows will be available in MP3 for $9.95 and ALAC and FLAC for $12.95. Each show is available for pre-order and will be released 72 hours after the completion of each show.

== Track listing ==
All tracks are written by Anthony Kiedis, Flea, Chad Smith and Josh Klinghoffer.

I'm with You track listing
No.	Title	Length
1.	"Monarchy of Roses"	4:11
2.	"Factory of Faith"	4:19
3.	"Brendan's Death Song"	5:39
4.	"Ethiopia"	3:50
5.	"Annie Wants a Baby"	3:40
6.	"Look Around"	3:28
7.	"The Adventures of Rain Dance Maggie"	4:42
8.	"Did I Let You Know"	4:21
9.	"Goodbye Hooray"	3:52
10.	"Happiness Loves Company"	3:33
11.	"Police Station"	5:35
12.	"Even You Brutus?"	4:00
13.	"Meet Me at the Corner"	4:21
14.	"Dance, Dance, Dance"	3:45
Total length:		59:15

== Personnel ==
Red Hot Chili Peppers

- Anthony Kiedis – lead vocals
- Josh Klinghoffer – guitar, backing vocals, keyboards, synthesizer, six-string bass on "Happiness Loves Company"
- Flea – bass guitar, piano, backing vocals
- Chad Smith – drums

Additional musicians

- Mauro Refosco – percussion (1, 2, 4, 5, 6, 7, 8, 10, 11, 12, 14)
- Lenny Castro – percussion (3, 9, 13), additional percussion (1, 2, 4, 12, 14)
- Greg Kurstin – piano (9, 11, 12)
- Money Mark – Hammond B-3 organ (6)
- Mike Bulger – trumpet (8)

Recording personnel

- Rick Rubin – production
- Andrew Scheps – mixing, recording
- Greg Fidelman – mixing (1, 2, 12), recording
- Ryan Hewitt – recording
- Sara Lynn Killion – recording assistant
- Phillip Broussard Jr. – recording assistant
- Ken Sluiter – recording assistant
- Chris "Hollywood" Holmes – editing
- Jason Gossman – editing
- Dana Nielsen – editing
- Vlado Meller – mastering
- Mark Santangelo – mastering assistant

Additional personnel

- Clara Balzary – album photography
- Damien Hirst – artwork
- Prudence Cuming Associates – album photography
- Stéphane Sednaoui – album photography

== Charts ==
=== Weekly charts ===
Weekly chart performance for I'm with You
Chart (2011)	Peak position
Argentine Albums (CAPIF)	1
Australian Albums (ARIA)	2
Austrian Albums (Ö3 Austria)	2
Belgian Albums (Ultratop Flanders)	3
Belgian Albums (Ultratop Wallonia)	2
Brazilian Albums (ABPD)	1
Canadian Albums (Billboard)	2
Croatian Albums (HDU)	1
Czech Albums (ČNS IFPI)	2
Danish Albums (Hitlisten)	1
Dutch Albums (Album Top 100)	1
Finnish Albums (Suomen virallinen lista)	1
French Albums (SNEP)	2
German Albums (Offizielle Top 100)	1
Greek Albums (IFPI)	3
Hungarian Albums (MAHASZ)	1
Irish Albums (IRMA)	1
Italian Albums (FIMI)	1
Japan Hot Albums (Billboard Japan)	2
Japanese Albums (Oricon)	2
Mexican Albums (Top 100 Mexico)	4
New Zealand Albums (RMNZ)	1
Norwegian Albums (VG-lista)	4
Polish Albums (ZPAV)	1
Portuguese Albums (AFP)	3
Russian Albums (2M)	1
Slovenian Albums (IFPI)	1
South Korean Albums (Circle)	22
South Korean International Albums (Circle)	1
Scottish Albums (Official Charts)	2
Spanish Albums (Promusicae)	1
Swedish Albums (Sverigetopplistan)	1
Swiss Albums (Romandie)	1
Swiss Albums (Schweizer Hitparade)	1
UK Albums (Official Charts)	1
US Billboard 200	2
US Top Alternative Albums (Billboard)	1
US Top Rock Albums (Billboard)	1
US Indie Store Album Sales (Billboard)	2
US Vinyl Albums (Billboard)	6

=== Year-end charts ===
2011 year-end chart performance for I'm with You
Chart (2011)	Position
Australian Albums (ARIA)	27
Austrian Albums (Ö3 Austria)	19
Belgian Albums (Ultratop Flanders)	47
Belgian Albums (Ultratop Wallonia)	33
Canadian Albums (Billboard)	43
Danish Albums (Hitlisten)	52
Dutch Albums (Album Top 100)	20
Finnish Albums (Suomen viralinen lista)	6
French Albums (SNEP)	41
German Albums (Offizielle Top 100)	21
Hungarian Albums (MAHASZ)	52
Italian Albums (FIMI)	26
Japan Hot Albums (Billboard Japan)	61
Japanese Albums (Oricon)	40
New Zealand Albums (RMNZ)	25
Polish Albums (ZPAV)	41
Russian Albums (2M)	27
South Korean International Albums (Gaon)	77
Spanish Albums (PROMUSICAE)	47
Swedish Albums (Sverigetopplistan)	37
Swedish Albums & Compilations (Sverigetopplistan)	63
Swiss Albums (Schweizer Hitparade)	13
UK Albums (OCC)	63
US Alternative Albums (Billboard)	7
US Billboard 200	71
US Top Rock Albums (Billboard)	9
Worldwide Albums (IFPI)	15

2012 year-end chart performance for I'm with You
Chart (2012)	Position
US Alternative Albums (Billboard)	36
US Top Rock Albums (Billboard)	56

== Certifications and sales ==
Certifications and sales for I'm with You
Region	Certification	Certified units/sales
Argentina (CAPIF)	Gold	20,000^{^}
Australia (ARIA)	Platinum	70,000^{^}
Austria (IFPI Austria)	Gold	10,000^{*}
Belgium (BRMA)	Gold	15,000^{*}
Brazil (Pro-Música Brasil)	Platinum	40,000^{*}
Canada (Music Canada)	Platinum	80,000^{^}
Denmark (IFPI Danmark)	Gold	10,000^{^}
Finland (Musiikkituottajat)	Gold	15,155
France (SNEP)	Platinum	100,000^{*}
Germany (BVMI)	Platinum	200,000^{^}
Greece (IFPI Greece)	Platinum	6,000^{^}
Ireland (IRMA)	Gold	7,500^{^}
Italy (FIMI)	Platinum	60,000^{*}
Japan (RIAJ)	Gold	100,000^{^}
Netherlands (NVPI)	Gold	25,000^{^}
New Zealand (RMNZ)	Platinum	15,000^{‡}
Poland (ZPAV)	Platinum	20,000^{*}
Russia (NFPF)	Gold	5,000^{*}
South Korea	—	2.369
Switzerland (IFPI Switzerland)	Platinum	30,000^{^}
United Kingdom (BPI)	Gold	100,000^{^}
United States (RIAA)	Gold	500,000^{^}
^{*} Sales figures based on certification alone.^{^} Shipments figures based on certification alone.^{‡} Sales+streaming figures based on certification alone.

== Release history ==
Release history for I'm with You
Region	Date	Format
Australia	August 26, 2011	CD, digital download
Canada	August 26, 2011	CD, digital download
Finland	August 26, 2011	CD, digital download
France	August 26, 2011	CD, digital download
Germany	August 26, 2011	CD, digital download
Ireland	August 26, 2011	CD, digital download
Netherlands	August 26, 2011	CD, digital download
United Kingdom	August 26, 2011	CD, digital download
Poland	August 29, 2011	CD, digital download
United States	August 29, 2011	CD, digital download
Brazil	August 30, 2011	CD, digital download
Japan	August 31, 2011	CD, digital download

- The vinyl version of the album was released on October 18, 2011, in the U.S. and on October 24, 2011, in UK.
