= The Adventures of Rain Dance Maggie =

2011 single by Red Hot Chili Peppers

Single by Red Hot Chili Peppers

from the album I'm with You
- Released: July 15, 2011
- Recorded: 2010–2011
- Genre: Alternative rock; pop rock; funk rock
- Length: 4:42 (album version); 3:58 (UK radio edit)
- Label: Warner Bros.
- Songwriters: Anthony Kiedis, Flea, Chad Smith, Josh Klinghoffer
- Producer: Rick Rubin

Red Hot Chili Peppers singles chronology
"Hump de Bump" (2007)	"The Adventures of Rain Dance Maggie" (2011)	"Monarchy of Roses" (2011)

Music video
- "The Adventures of Rain Dance Maggie" on YouTube

"The Adventures of Rain Dance Maggie" is a song by the Red Hot Chili Peppers, released as the first single from their tenth album I'm with You (2011). It was their first single since "Hump de Bump" in 2007, and their first with new guitarist Josh Klinghoffer. The song was released to radio on July 15, 2011, three days earlier than expected, due to an accidental release. The download was made available on July 18 while the CD single was released four days later.

The single became the band's record-holding 12th number-one single on the Billboard Alternative Songs chart where it spent four straight weeks atop the chart. It also peaked at number 38 on the Hot 100 chart, giving them their last Top 40 hit on that chart to date.

== Song background ==
The song's bassline was conceived in bassist Flea's kitchen. Anthony Kiedis notes that "When I first heard [the song], I didn't know it would be a single. [But] I knew that I loved the jam. [...] I took it home and it felt so fun to listen to at length that I literally left it on in my driveway, opened the door and danced with the tree next to me for quite a while. I had no idea that it would even be a song, I just thought, 'Oh, this is a great dance track. Let's put it on as a B-side, [an] hour long.' And then, as fate would have it, people heard it, and they were like, 'Oh, that's your best thing right there. That's your best thing.'"

When asked about who exactly Maggie is, Kiedis said that he is not about to reveal his inspirations. "It's just a collection of memories and people along the way that had maybe left my consciousness until I heard that music, and then they kind of came dancing back into my consciousness, and out the old pen onto the paper. "Names have been changed to protect the innocent. Although there is a Maggie, I realized later. There's two Maggies, actually."

Flea was asked about the single and said that he was not really good at picking singles and really did not know which song was good to be released first. He described the song as a cool, simple, funky little jam but being completely different from the rest of the songs on the album and nothing else sounds like it. Flea stated that the band wrote 70 songs so not even necessarily all the best songs made it onto the album, just the ones that occupy their own space.

== Music videos ==
On June 23, 2011, it was announced that hip hop artist Kreayshawn had been picked to direct the music video. Kreayshawn told MTV that she was shocked when the band's label contacted her management about directing the video. She said she went to film school but never thought it would translate to something this big. In the end, her footage was not used as the band did not think the video related to the meaning of the song.

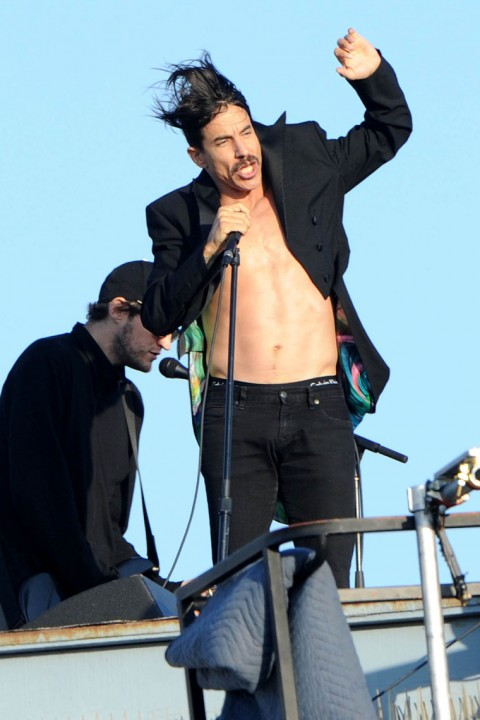
Klinghoffer (left and background) and Kiedis (right and foreground) during the shooting of the music video at Venice Beach

On July 30, 2011, the band took to the rooftop of a building in Venice Beach, California to shoot a second version of the music video with director Marc Klasfeld.

On August 14, 2011, actress Melanee E. Nelson discussed the concept of the Kreayshawn video. Nelson was told by a Warner Bros representative that the video is unlikely to be released and that the band was going in a different direction. Nelson said the video took place in a 1990s underground setting where she played a girl who knows everyone and features many antics with a geek-type character. Nelson said the geek character's drink gets laced with something so there were fantasy scenes involving a goat and it raining inside the club. She said she also heard animation was going to be added later. Each band member also played different characters in the video. Chad played the bouncer, Flea played the bartender while Anthony and Josh play paramedics.

The band decided to go with the Marc Klasfeld-directed video rather than the Kreayshawn version, and it is unknown why they opted to use a different director when re-shooting the video. Klasfeld spoke about the concept behind the video, saying it was simple and iconic. He said that Anthony Kiedis was inspired by the Beatles 1969 rooftop performance. Klasfeld said of filming on a rooftop that they were a bit worried because they had no safety net and worried about the band going too close to the edges, but they were professionals and had no problems.

The video was released on August 17, 2011, through MTV.com and the band's website. MTV aired the United States television premiere of the video on the same date at 7:53 pm Eastern Standard Time, which was followed by a live Q&A with the band answering fan questions through Twitter on MTV.com.

The video was named the 30th best of the year by VH-1 in their annual year-end countdown of the top 40 videos of 2011. In October 2011, the video reached number one on their weekly video countdown, where it held that spot for a few weeks.

== Live Performances ==
The Adventures Of Rain Dance Maggie was one of two I'm with You songs to be played at every show on the I'm With You Tour along with Monarchy of Roses. It was played regularly on The Getaway World Tour and was played until Josh Klinghoffer's final shows with the band. It was last played on October 3rd 2019

== Reception ==
Artistdirect gave the song 5 out of 5 stars, describing it as "pure funk rock genius" and commenting how the song feels like it came back in time from the future. They describe the lyrics of the song as "otherworldly and captivating". Rolling Stone gave the song 3 out of 5 stars, calling it "everything you want from the Chilis" and commenting that Kiedis "woos a wild child with the type of come-ons only he can deliver with a straight face". About.com gave the song 4 out of 5 stars, praising the song for its "Strong, sensual guitar solo from Josh Klinghoffer", "Stripped down funky rock feel" and "Solid, singalong chorus". They conclude by calling the song "solid preview" for I'm With You.

The song reached number one on the Billboard Rock Songs chart. On August 10, 2011, the song became the band's record holding 12th number one single on the Billboard Alternative Songs chart where it spent four straight weeks atop the chart. Rolling Stone named the song the 50th best of 2011 in their annual Top 50 singles list.

The single was certified gold by the Federation of the Italian Music Industry.

== Leak ==
The band's label had set a worldwide release date of July 18, 2011 for the single. A special Facebook page was set up where fans could RSVP to an online event where they would be the first to hear the new single, get the latest news and be the first to buy the digital download. On July 15, 2011, the single was briefly made available through an accidental leak on the band's website but quickly removed moments later. However, it was up long enough for someone to record it and transfer it throughout the Internet, through the unofficial forum stadium-arcadium.com. A member there leaked it onto YouTube through invite only, which soon got made public. Due to the leak, which was a low quality version of the single, the band's label decided to go ahead and release the single to radio that same day and also released the only high quality version at the time to the website of KROQ-FM. The label still celebrated the July 18 worldwide release as the official release date of the single to the band's website, Facebook page, YouTube and through digital download.

In an interview with Zane Lowe, Flea discussed the leak even further by saying "The only thing that I would ever worry about would be if I was lazy or I didn't really take my time in the songwriting process to make the music as good as I thought it could be. That's the only thing I ever fret about because I do have a lazy streak. Anything that happens once the music is done, come what may."

== Formats and track listings ==
In addition to one-track CD singles, promo versions of the single were released in the United Kingdom:

UK Promo single 1

1. "The Adventures of Rain Dance Maggie" – 4:42
2. "The Adventures of Rain Dance Maggie" (UK Radio Edit) – 3:58

UK Promo single 2

1. "The Adventures of Rain Dance Maggie" (UK Radio Edit) – 3:58

== Personnel ==
Red Hot Chili Peppers

- Anthony Kiedis – lead vocals
- Josh Klinghoffer – electric and acoustic guitar, backing vocals in the studio
- Flea – bass, piano, backing vocals in live performances
- Chad Smith – drums

Additional musicians

- Mauro Refosco – percussion, güiro, tambourine, cowbell, cabasa, handclaps

== Charts ==
=== Weekly charts ===
Weekly chart performance for "The Adventures of Rain Dance Maggie"
Chart (2011–2012)	Peak position
Australia (ARIA)	41
Austria (Ö3 Austria Top 40)	20
Belgium (Ultratop 50 Flanders)	14
Belgium (Ultratop 50 Wallonia)	8
Canada Hot 100 (Billboard)	16
Canada Rock (Billboard)	1
Czech Republic Airplay (ČNS IFPI)	24
Finland (Suomen virallinen lista)	20
France (SNEP)	38
Germany (GfK)	20
Hungary (Rádiós Top 40)	7
Iceland (RÚV)	12
Israel (Media Forest)	5
Italy (FIMI)	13
Japan (Japan Hot 100)	6
Netherlands (Dutch Top 40)	24
Netherlands (Single Top 100)	28
New Zealand (Recorded Music NZ)	30
Slovakia (IFPI)	3
Spain (Promusicae)	43
Switzerland (Schweizer Hitparade)	26
UK Singles (OCC)	44
US Billboard Hot 100	38
US Alternative Airplay (Billboard)	1
US Adult Pop Airplay (Billboard)	18
US Mainstream Rock (Billboard)	2
US Hot Rock & Alternative Songs (Billboard)	1

=== Year-end charts ===
Annual chart rankings for "The Adventures of Rain Dance Maggie"
Chart (2011)	Position
Japan (Japan Hot 100)	62
Hungary (Rádiós Top 40)	86
Italy (Musica e dischi)	51
US Alternative Songs (Billboard)	12
US Mainstream Rock (Billboard)	21
US Hot Rock & Alternative Songs (Billboard)	7

Chart (2012)	Position
US Hot Rock & Alternative Songs (Billboard)	33

== Certifications ==
Certifications and sales for "The Adventures of Rain Dance Maggie"
Region	Certification	Certified units/sales
Italy (FIMI)	Gold	15,000^{*}
United States (RIAA)	Platinum	1,000,000^{‡}
^{*} Sales figures based on certification alone.^{‡} Sales+streaming figures based on certification alone.

== Release history ==
Release dates and formats for "The Adventures of Rain Dance Maggie"
Region	Date	Format	Label(s)	Ref.
United States	September 13, 2011	Mainstream airplay	Warner Bros.	
