= Mauro Refosco =

Brazilian percussionist

Mauro Camilo Refosco
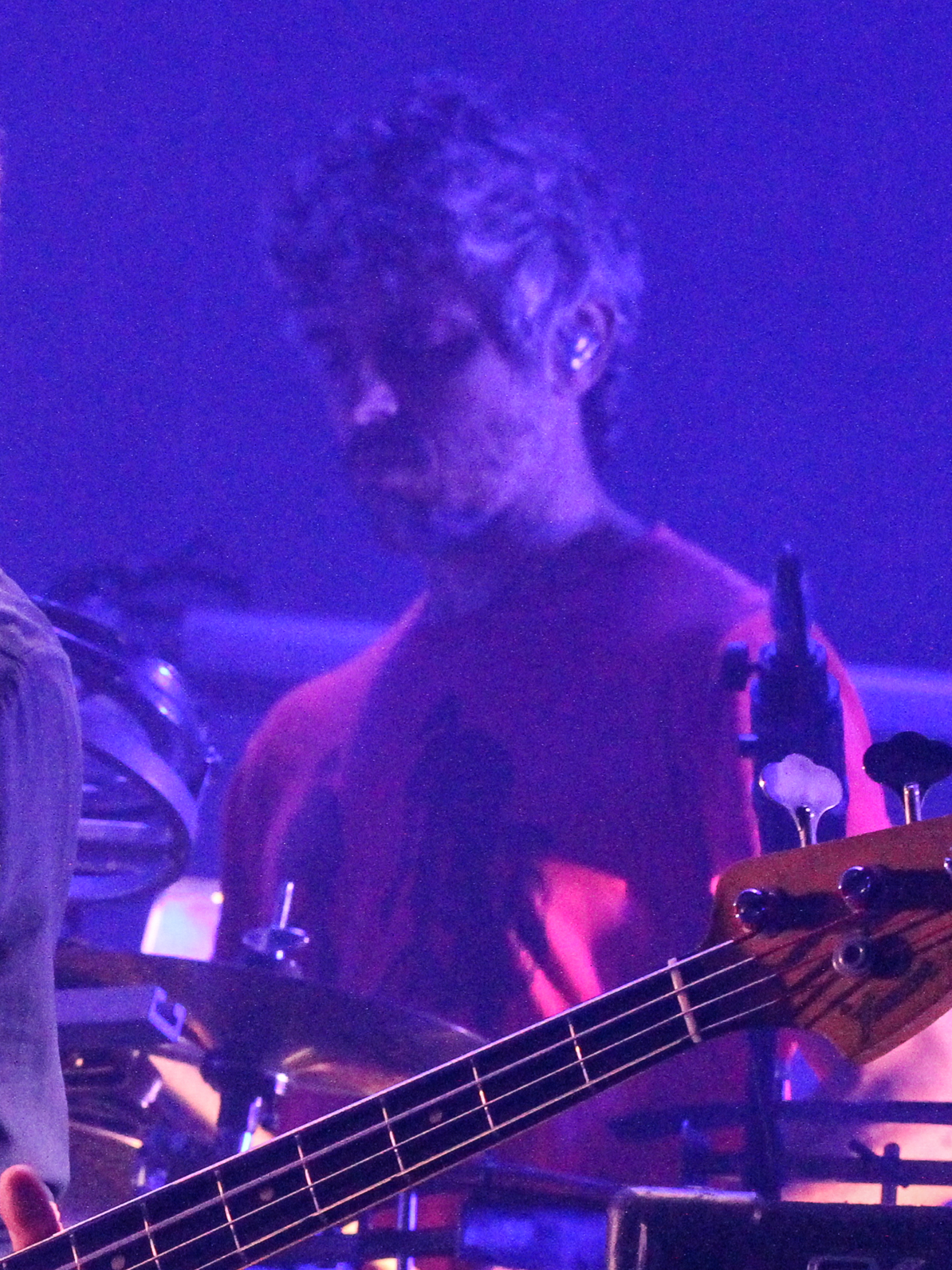
- Refosco performing with Atoms for Peace in 2013

Background information
- Born: 16 October 1966 (age 59); Joaçaba, Santa Catarina, Brazil
- Genres: Alternative rock; forró; jazz; funk rock; experimental rock; IDM; electronica
- Occupation: Musician
- Instruments: Percussion; marimba
- Years active: 1994–present

Mauro Refosco (born 16 October 1966), is a Brazilian percussionist. He is best known for his work with singer David Byrne and the American rock band Red Hot Chili Peppers. He was a member of the experimental supergroup Atoms for Peace – featuring Thom Yorke and Flea – and the forró band Forro in the Dark. Refosco was also briefly a member of Dirty Projectors.

Since 2019, Refosco has appeared as one of the principal musicians in the Broadway show, American Utopia, featuring David Byrne and his music.

== Early life and education ==
Refosco was born in the southern Brazilian state of Santa Catarina. He obtained a bachelor's degree in Percussion from the São Paulo State University in 1990 and moved to New York City, in 1992, to pursue additional education. He graduated from the Manhattan School of Music with a Masters in Percussion in 1994.

== Career ==
After completing his masters program he started recording and performing with various American artists.

He has written and produced music for Off-Broadway productions, composed soundtracks for films and performed as a member of various bands.

=== Forro in the Dark ===
Forro in the Dark is a New York City-based group of Brazilian musicians who play a modern update on forró, a traditional music that originates from the Northeast of Brazil On 16 October 2002 (Refosco's birthday), he invited some friends over for a forró-style jam session at Nublu, a nightclub located in the East Village district of New York City. The group was such a hit that they started a weekly residency at the club. Their public prominence increased due to their extended residency at Nublu, where they came into contact with prominent New York influence David Byrne, who helped propel further recognition for the band when they collaborated on Forro in the Dark's 2006 album Bonfires of São João.

The band have released two albums and one EP so far including 2006's Bonfires of São João, 2008's Dia de Roda EP and 2009's Light a Candle.

=== Atoms for Peace ===
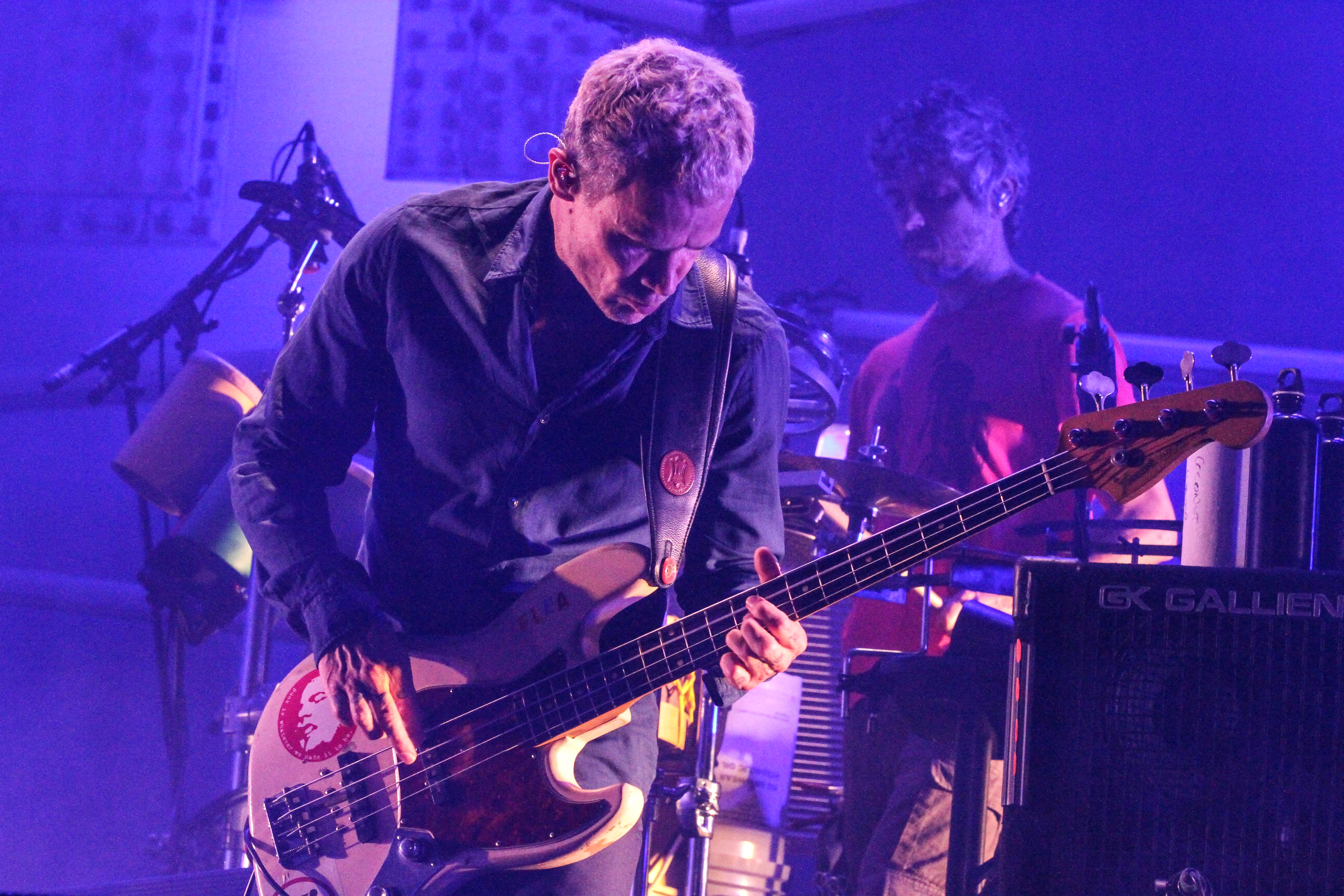
Refosco (back) performing with Flea as part of Atoms for Peace in 2013

In 2009, Refosco joined Atoms for Peace, a supergroup formed by the Radiohead singer Thom Yorke to perform songs from Yorke's debut solo album, The Eraser (2006). Refosco and the band recreated Yorke's electronic music with live instrumentation. They toured the United States in 2010, and released an album, Amok, in 2013. Amok was followed that year by a tour of Europe, the US and Japan.

=== Red Hot Chili Peppers ===
In 2011, Refosco performed on several tracks on the Red Hot Chili Peppers' album I'm with You along with the b-sides compilation, I'm Beside You, which was released in 2013. Refosco joined the band's touring lineup as a percussionist in 2011 for their I'm with You World Tour. During the band's encores, Refosco along with the band's drummer, Chad Smith would usually start off with a lengthy drum-percussion jam showing off both musicians' abilities. Refosco was featured on all of the band's live releases from the tour, which came to an end in April 2013. He would again hit the road with the band for another tour with dates all over the world scheduled from May 2013 to June 2014. Refosco provided percussion on two songs for their 2016 album The Getaway however he would not join them for the tour to support the album. Refosco made a surprise appearance during the band's 20 July 2017 performance in Rome where he provided percussion on "The Adventures of Rain Dance Maggie".

=== Other work ===
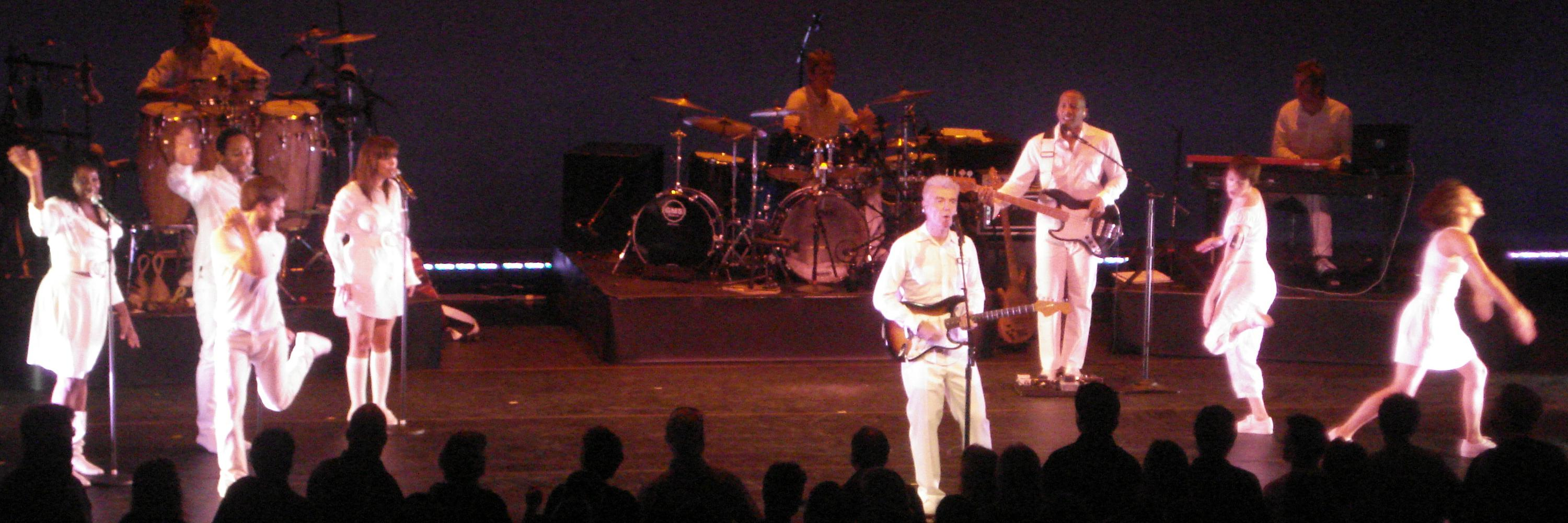
Refosco performing during a David Byrne and Brian Eno Tour at Zoellner Arts Center in 2008.

Since 1994, he has toured with David Byrne, most recently on his 2025 tour in support of his album Who Is the Sky?.

Refosco has also been featured as a member of the music department, mainly as a percussionist on various movie and television projects including the 2007 animated movie, Surf's Up in which he wrote the song, "Forrowest" with Forro in the Dark. The song also is featured on the soundtrack.

Refosco has also recorded with Dirty Projectors on their self-titled album.

Refosco appears on Flea's 2026 solo debut album Honora

== Works ==
with Forro in the Dark

- Bonfires of São João (2006)
- Dia de Roda (2008)
- Light a Candle (2009)

with Red Hot Chili Peppers

- I'm with You (2011)
- Red Hot Chili Peppers Live: I'm with You (2011)
- Official Bootlegs (2011–2013)
- 2011 Live EP (2012)
- I'm With You Sessions (2012–2013)
- I'm Beside You (2013)
- The Getaway (2016)
- Unlimited Love (2022)
- Return of the Dream Canteen (2022)

with Atoms for Peace

- Amok (2013)

with David Byrne

- Look into the Eyeball (2001)
- Grown Backwards (2004)
- Everything That Happens Will Happen Today (2008)
- Love This Giant (2012)
- American Utopia (2018)

with Dirty Projectors

- Dirty Projectors (2017)
- Lamp Lit Prose (2018)

with Francesco Motta

- Vivere o morire (2018)

with Flea

- Honora (2026)

=== Soundtrack / film / television ===
- Side Streets (1998)
- Earthly Possessions (1999)
- The Backyardigans (2004)
- Ira & Abby (2006)
- Surf's Up (wrote the song, "Forrowest") (2007)
- Be Kind Rewind (2008)
- This Must Be the Place (2011)
