= NAMM Oral History Program =

Interviews with music products industry

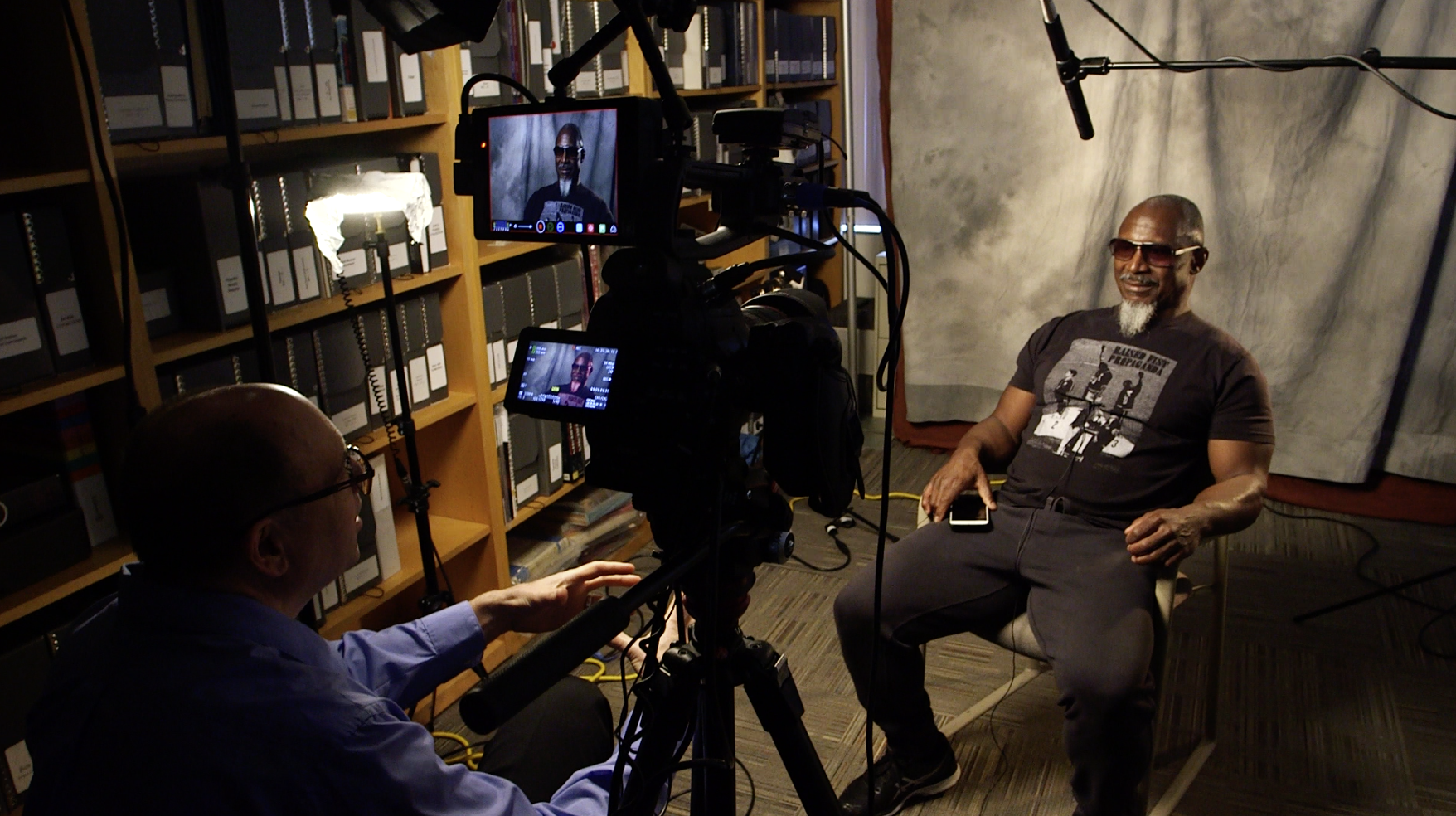
A NAMM Oral History Interview with Karl Denson

The NAMM Oral History Program is an oral history project and archive of recordings of interviews with people from all aspects of the music products industry, including music instrument retailers, musical instrument and product creators, suppliers and sales representatives, music educators and advocates, publishers, live sound and recording pioneers, innovators, founders, and musicians.

Established in 2000 by NAMM: The International Music Products Association to preserve the history of the music products industry as well as improve music education worldwide, the program includes over 5,000 audio or video interviews available to the public via online streaming.

== Background ==
In 1996, NAMM established the NAMM Resource Center to preserve the history of the music products industry. In 2000 the Oral History Program was founded, with Dan Del Fiorentino, NAMM Music Historian and former curator of the NAMM Foundation's Museum of Making Music as lead interviewer. The first NAMM Oral History interview, with professional harmonica player Bill Walden, was conducted on March 5, 2000, at the Museum of Making Music's opening day.

== Purpose ==
The NAMM Oral History Program seeks to capture one-on-one interviews with those involved with the music products industry to document and preserve the evolution of musical instruments and music retail, and improve music education worldwide. Interview subjects include but are not limited to: music instrument designers, manufacturers, and retailers, composers, arrangers, and publishers, recording and live sound engineers, and musicians.

== The collection ==
The collection includes interviews with people from over 80 countries and all 50 U.S. states, born between 1903 and 2001.

Musical instrument pioneers and founders of companies that manufacture music products have been interviewed for the collection, including Moog Music founder Bob Moog, Roland and Boss founder Ikutaro Kakehashi, Korg co-founder Tsutomu Katoh, Orange founder Clifford Cooper, guitar innovator Ted McCarty, Taylor Guitars co-founder Bob Taylor, Remo founder Remo Belli, Roger Linn, Tom Oberheim, Ray Kurzweil, Henry E. Steinway of Steinway & Sons, Meyer Sound Laboratories co-founder Helen Meyer, and Hirotaka Kawai, a key figure in the Kawai Musical Instruments Manufacturing Company. The collection's interviews also include factory workers and salespeople who worked for music product manufacturers or sold the products those companies produced.

The collection includes interviews from music product retailers, covering the history of such music store chains as Guitar Center and Sam Ash, as well as independent music stores around the world such as Andertons Music Co. in England, Daynes Music in the U.S., and Tom Lee Music in Hong Kong. Other interviews include key figures in music product retailing, such as Henry Goldrich of Manny's Music and George Gruhn of Gruhn Guitars.

Interviews with songwriters within the collection include interviews with Songwriters Hall of Fame members Allee Willis and Marilyn Bergman, and folk singer and songwriter Pete Seeger. Composers interviewed for the collection include electronic music pioneer Morton Subotnick and former Yes guitarist and film composer Trevor Rabin.

A wide variety of musicians from different musical eras and genres are included in the collection, including recording pioneer Les Paul, blues legend and Rock and Roll Hall of Fame member B.B. King, Country Music Hall of Fame members Emmylou Harris and Roy Clark, rock musician Lita Ford, Ike Turner, Steve Miller, John Waite, and Jason Mraz. The collection also includes interviews with Herbie Hancock, Keith Emerson, Rick Wakeman, and 27-time Grammy Award-winning artist Chick Corea, as well as big band leader and former Glenn Miller Orchestra member Ray Anthony, jazz drummer Joe Morello, Elvis Presley guitarist Scotty Moore, Wrecking Crew Drummer Hal Blaine, Sun Studio session drummer J. M. Van Eaton, Johnny Cash and Carl Perkins drummer W. S. Holland, guitarist Brian Setzer, percussionist and singer Sheila E., and A. R. Rahman. Interviews with pioneering hip-hop artists and DJs in the collection include Afrika Bambaataa, Grand Wizzard Theodore, DJ Jazzy Joyce, Grandmaster Caz, and Jazzy Jay.

Over the years the scope of the collection has expanded to include audio engineers such as Grand Ole Opry engineer Kevin McGinty, SoundGirls executive director Karrie Keyes, and the "Father of Festival Sound" Bill Hanley, as well as pro audio pioneers such as Al Schmitt and George Massenburg, whose involvement with professional audio equipment and recording studios has helped the industry grow. Additionally the collection contains interviews with such producers as Quincy Jones, Matt Ross-Spang, and Stax Records executive Al Bell.

== Music History Project podcast ==
In 2017, NAMM launched the Music History Project podcast covering interviews and topics from the NAMM Oral History program.

== The NAMM Oral History Service Award ==
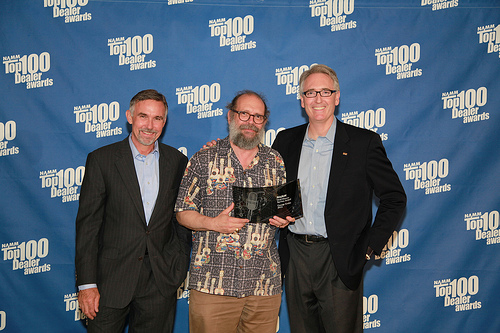
George Gruhn, the 2011 NAMM Oral History Service Award Winner

The NAMM Oral History Service Award was established in 2011 and recognizes the major contributions of those who have been interviewed themselves and who have strongly supported the program by providing historical context and suggesting others to be included. The award is presented at the NAMM Show each year by the NAMM CEO and the NAMM Music Historian. The list of winners is as follows:

- 2011: George Gruhn
- 2012: Keith Mardak
- 2013: Dennis Houlihan
- 2014: Jim Funada
- 2015: Madeline Crouch
- 2016: Ernie Lansford
- 2017: Craig Smith
- 2018: Bernie Capicchiano
- 2019: Harold "Hap" Kuffner
- 2020: Robert Wilson MBE
- 2021: Gerhard Meinl
- 2022: Larry Morton
- 2023: Lenise Bent
- 2024: Jeri Palumbo and Erik Zobler
