= Women's International Music Network =

International female music organization

- Abbreviation: WiMN
- Formation: 2012; 14 years ago
- Founder: Laura B. Whitmore
- Region served: Worldwide
- Website: www.thewimn.com

The Women's International Music Network (WiMN) is a 501(c)(3) non-profit organization that provides support, information, and community for women within the music industry. Founded in 2012 by Laura B. Whitmore, the WiMN produces and hosts events, workshops, and panels, including the She Rocks Awards.

== History ==
The organization was founded in November 2012 by Laura B. Whitmore with a goal of providing support, information, and a sense of community for women in all walks of the industry, including performers, business insiders, educators and students. The organization's website serves as a hub for the group to share news pertaining to female musicians, projects relating to women in the industry, products targeted to female musicians, special WiMN event details and other events in the community.

== She Rocks Awards ==
Beginning in 2013, the WiMN has hosted the She Rocks Awards annually to recognize women in the music industry, with the first She Rocks Awards taking place during the first annual Women's International Music Network breakfast on January 25, 2013 during the NAMM Show in Anaheim, California, at the Anaheim Marriott Hotel. 2013 honorees included producer/songwriter Holly Knight, guitarist Orianthi, Tish Ciravolo from Daisy Rock Girl Guitars, Mary Peavey of Peavey Electronics, Laura Taylor of Guitar Center, Carla DeSantis Black of MEOW and Pauline France of Fender Guitars. It featured a performance by Orianthi who was joined on stage by bassist Nik West and drummer Brittany Maccarello. The event was hosted in partnership with NewBay Media, the publishers of Guitar World, Guitar Player, Bass Player, Electronic Musician and other music industry media outlets.

The WiMN hosted the third annual She Rocks Awards at the Anaheim Hilton Hotel on January 23, 2015 during the NAMM Show. The event honored Colby Caillat, The Bangles, Mindi Abair, Amani Duncan of Martin Guitar, Craigie Zildjian of Avedis Zildjian Company, Katie Kailus of Music Inc. Magazine, Paula Salvatore of Capitol Studios, Debbie Cavalier of Berklee College of Music and Gayle Beacock of Beacock Music. WiMN founder Whitmore co-hosted the event along with guitarist Orianthi.

The fourth annual She Rocks Awards took place on January 22, 2016 at the Hilton Anaheim Hotel during the NAMM Show. The event was co-hosted by Whitmore and guitarist Nita Strauss. Honorees included Chaka Khan, Jennifer Batten, Amy Heidemann of Karmin, Becky Gebhardt and Mona Tavakoli from the Rock N Roll Camp for Girls L.A. and Raining Jane, Cathy Carter Duncan of Seymour Duncan, Crystal Morris of Gator Cases, Chalise Zolezzi of Taylor Guitars, Mindy Abovitz of Tom Tom Magazine, Mary Luehrsen of NAMM, Leslie Ann Jones, Pamela Cole and Leigh Maples of Fanny's House of Music, Tom Gilbert, and Sujata Murthy of Universal Music. Performers included The Command Sisters, Jenna Paone, Malina Moye, Jennifer Batten, Raining Jane and the band Rock Sugah, which features Divinity Roxx, Kat Dyson, Benita Lewis and Lynette Williams.

The 2017 She Rocks Awards recognized Monique Boyer of MAC Cosmetics, Rebecca Eaddy of Roland Corporation U.S., Lita Ford, Beverly Fowler of PRS Guitars, Lisa Foxx of the iHeartRadio network, Charyn Harris of A Place Called Home, Karrie Keyes of SoundGirls and sound engineer for Pearl Jam, Tracy Leenman of Musical Innovations, Dani Markman of Disney Music Group, Shirley Manson, and Esperanza Spalding, Leanne Summers of LAWIM (Los Angeles Women in Music).

In 2018 the She Rocks Awards took place at the House of Blues Anaheim. Honorees included Melissa Etheridge, Pat Benatar, Kate Pierson & Cindy Wilson of the B-52s, Karla Redding-Andrews of the Otis Redding Foundation, X] vocalist Exene Cervenka, Amberly Crouse-Knox of BMG Production Music, the members of the band Fanny (Jean Millington Adamian, June Millington, Brie Darling, Patti Quatro, Alice de Buhr), Candace Stewart of EastWest Studios, Dawn Birr of Sennheiser Business Solutions, Fabi Reyna of She Shreds Media and Reyna Tropical, Vanessa Mering of HARMAN Professional, and Kristy Porter of Guitar Center.

In 2019 the She Rocks Awards added a Lifetime Achievement Award, which it awarded to Janis Joplin. Other honorees included Terri Nunn (Icon award), Macy Gray, Lisa Loeb, Nita Strauss, Erika Ender, Dana DuFine, AEG Facilities (Powerhouse award), Dale Krevens of Tech 21 (Mad Skills award), Lynette Sage of Reverb.com (Innovator award), Samantha Pink of JAM Industries USA (Excellence Award), and Terri Winston of Women’s Audio Mission.

In 2020 the She Rocks Awards took place at the House of Blues in Anaheim, CA. The honorees included Gloria Gaynor who performed "I Will Survive," Linda Perry, Lzzy Hale of Halestorm, Tal Wilkenfeld, Suzi Quatro, Beatie Wolfe, Suzanne D’Addario Brouder, Tara Low, Myrna Sislen, Judy Schaefer of PRS Guitars, engineer and producer Ebonie Smith, and singer/songwriter Jenna Paone.

In 2021 the Women's International Music Network produced a virtual version of the She Rocks Awards due to the COVID-19 pandemic. That year the honorees included The Go-Go's, Nancy Wilson of Heart, Amy Lee of Evanescence, Cherie Currie of The Runaways, drummer Cindy Blackman Santana, comedian and musician Margaret Cho, pianist Starr Parodi, Ann Mincieli of She is the Music, Sharon Hennessey, Gwen Riley of Peloton, Kim Warnick, and Laura Clapp Davidson of Shure.

The She Rocks Awards resumed its in person event in 2022, honoring Dionne Warwick, Meredith Brooks, Milck, Yvette Young, Lyndsey Parker, Carmen Vandenberg, Julie Robbins, Sherri Chung, Leslie Gaston-Bird, EveAnna Manley of Manley Laboratories, and Kerry Fiero.

In 2023 the She Rocks Awards honored Judy Collins, Noelle Scaggs, Gretchen Menn, Shelly Peiken, Mary Spender, Katherine Wing, Stacey Ryan, Lisa S. Johnson, Michelle Bell, and Helen Culleton.

In 2024 the She Rocks Awards honored Debbie Gibson, Lindsey Stirling, Bonnie McIntosh, Britt Lightning, Kelsy Karter, Holly G, Sylvia Massy, Lindsay Love-Bivens, Melinda Newman, Laura Karpman, and Jamie Deering.

The 2025 She Rocks Awards was on January 25, 2025 at the Hilton Anaheim. It was co-hosted by guitarist Jennifer Batten and Susanna Hoffs of The Bangles. Honorees included Samantha Fish, Paula Cole, AIJIA, Mixi Demner of Stitched Up Heart, Katie Daryl, Beth Heidt of Gibson (guitar company), Amanda Palmer, Theresa Hoffman of C. F. Martin & Company, Chris Schyvinck of Shure and Nurit Siegel Smith of Music Forward Foundation.

The 2026 She Rocks Awards took place on January 23, 2026 at the Hilton Anaheim. The co-hosts were Vicki Peterson of The Bangles and Mixi Demner for Stitched Up Heart. Honorees included Rachel Platten, Carnie Wilson, Judith Hill, Rhonda Smith, Sophie Burrell, Margaret Glaspy, Andreea Gleason, Heather Dembert Rafter, Kay Hanley, Michelle Lewis, Lisa Worden, Lisa MacDonald of Yamaha Corporation, Reina Ichihashi of Roland Corporation, and Susan Lipp of Full Compass Systems. There was an in memorium performance by the Dresden Dolls.

The 2027 She Rocks Awards will take place in Anaheim on Saturday, January 30, 2027.
