= Gruhn =

Gruhn is a German surname, a phonetic variant of Grune. Notable people with the surname include:

- George Gruhn (born 1945), American writer, businessman and ophiophilist, specialized on vintage guitars
  - Gruhn Guitars, a musical instrument shop in Nashville, Tennessee
- Josephine Gruhn (1927–2015), American politician
- Jouleen Gruhn (born 1984), German politician
- Wilfried Gruhn (born 1939), German violinist, musicologist, music educator and emeritus professor
