= Catharine Wood =

American musician

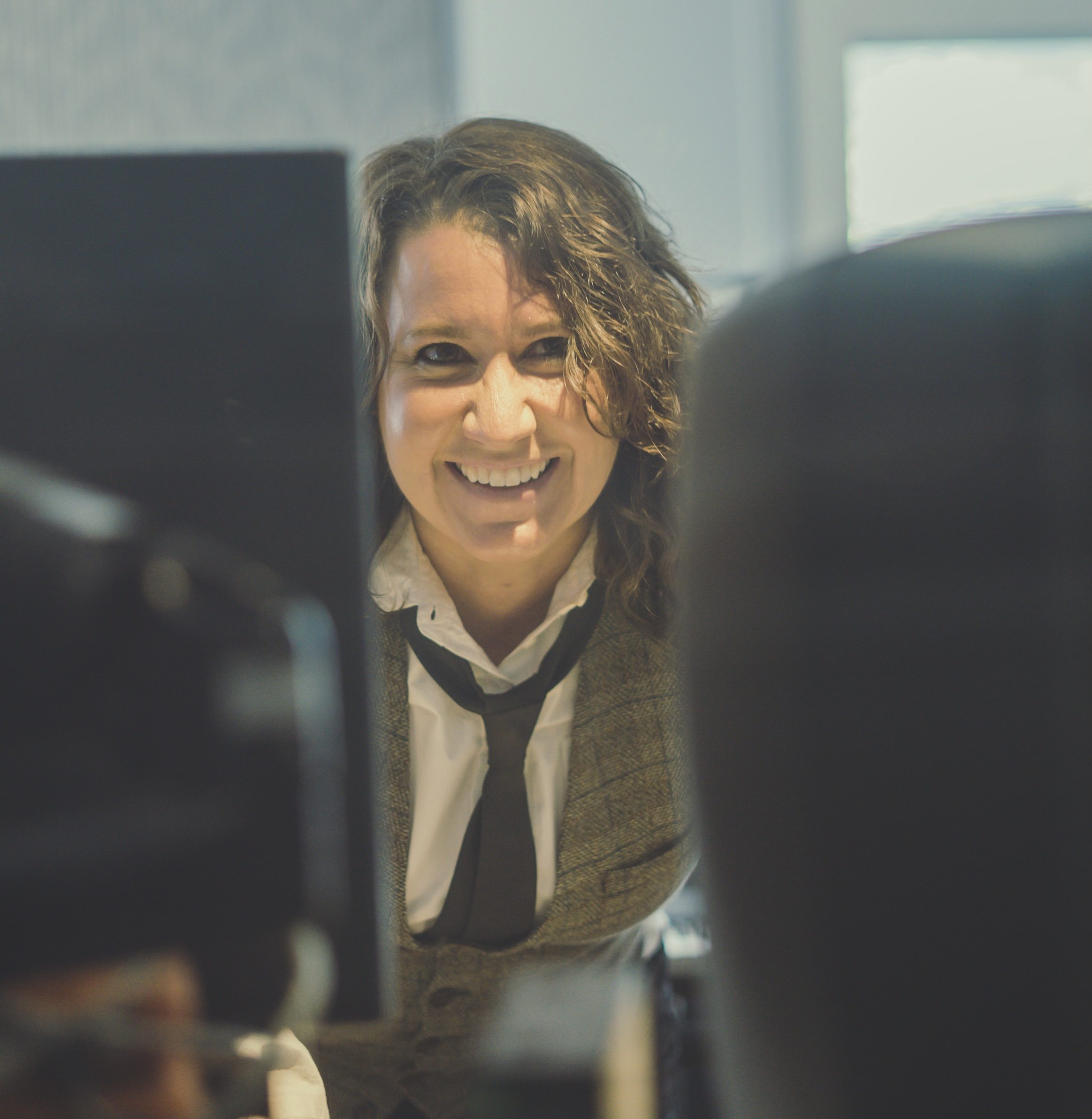
- Catharine Wood

Background information
- Born: Catharine St. Clair Wood; July 10, 1973 (age 53); Hong Kong
- Genres: Pop, Folk, Rock, Soul
- Occupations: Composer, Songwriter, Music producer, Engineer, Studio owner, Activist
- Years active: 2000–present
- Labels: APM (Sony/UMG), Planetwood Productions, ESPN (DMG)
- Website: https://www.planetwoodstudios.com

Catharine Wood (born July 10, 1973) is an American composer, songwriter, musician, producer, audio engineer and studio owner associated with both popular music and music for picture. Her work is primarily influenced by folk, rock, pop and soul music. In addition to being a vocal activist for songwriters, Wood is recognized for her contributions as a recording arts leader and mentor by AES and NAMM presenting alongside Grammy winning Leslie Ann Jones and Lenise Bent. She has been highlighted in two UK published Routledge academic books as a trailblazer in the professional music engineering and producer community: “Women in Audio” and “Gender in Music Production” in Chapters 4 (Sound for Television and Film) and 13 (Perspective Through a Female and Feminine Lens) respectively. In 2022, Wood was elected to The Recording Academy Los Angeles Chapter Board of Governors.

== Early life and education ==
Born in Hong Kong, in 1973, Wood was raised in Connecticut, Colorado and California. Wood studied at Colorado College (with a BA in Art) followed by postgraduate study in audio engineering, music production and audio post-production at the LA Recording School where she graduated at the top of her class in 2005.

== Music and engineering career ==
As a composer and producer, Wood has had original work released by APM/Sonoton under the SureFire Label (Sony/UMG), ESPN (Disney) produced by Norm Whitehurst, on many major networks, and has engineered on music ranging from ABC Music/UMG Soul Movers Band (Mastering Engineer) “Hot Sauce (GEM Remix)” to global commercials during her tenure at Play Studios, Santa Monica; including the first iPhone “hello” TV ad and the “Get A Mac” campaign, heralded by Ad Age as one of the top 15 campaigns of the 21st century. Wood is credited for her score recording work on The Planters Film, which captured 11 notable awards including AFIFEST Official Selection 2019 and Raindance 2019 top honor, Film of the Festival. Her studio, Planetwood Studios, LLC, is one of the few solely female-owned and operated studios in Los Angeles.

== Activism ==
As an advocate for songwriters, Wood took the position of Executive Committee member for the Corona Virus Songwriter Emergency Relief Grant Fund in 2020 (created by SONA), alongside Autumn Rowe, Leland, and Leona Lewis, offering grants to support songwriters through the pandemic, following an unprecedented charitable contribution of two hundred and fifty thousand dollars from Sony ATV’s chairman, Jon Platt. Wood is a regular contributor to the Songwriters of North America education efforts as well as SoundGirls.org. In 2022, she was a noted contributor to Emily Lazar's We Are Moving The Needle "Fix The Mix" initiative - aiming to eradicate the dramatic gender gap in the recording industry. Women in music are significantly under-represented in the recording industry by comparison to their male counterparts, with only 2.6% female music producers as illustrated in the Annenberg Inclusion Initiative, published by the USC Annenberg School for Communication and Journalism in 2021.

== Personal life ==
Wood currently lives in Los Angeles, California, and is a member of the LGBTQIA+ community.

== Awards ==
Year	Award	Category	Nominee(s)	Result	Ref.
2021	Hollywood Music In Media Awards (HMMA)	Pop	GEM ("No Ordinary Days")	Nominated	
2020	Hollywood Music In Media Awards (HMMA)	Pop	GEM ("If I'm Honest")	Nominated	
2020	Hollywood Music In Media Awards (HMMA)	Downbeat/Downtempo	GEM ("Malibu")	Nominated	
2016	Hollywood Music In Media Awards (HMMA)	Singer-Songwriter	Billy Lawler ("Casualty")	Nominated	

== Selected discography ==
- Hot Sauce (GEM Remix) (Soul Movers Band, ABC Music) 2021
- No Ordinary Days (GEM) 2021
- A Parrot Sipping Tea (Michael Robinson, Azure Miles Records) 2021
- If I’m Honest (Luxury Remix)(GEM) 2020
- DayDream (GEM) 2020
- If I’m Honest (GEM) 2020
- Malibu (GEM) 2020
- Billionaire (GEM Remix) (Max Jackson) 2020
- Bad Idea (GEM Remix) (Max Jackson) 2020
- Higher Ground (GEM) 2020
- Letting Go (GEM) 2020
- Keep Me From Blowing Away (Anna Ash) 2020
- Retro (Boy SODA) 2020
- Missin (Boy SODA) 2019
- I Like The Simple Life (Katie Ekin/APM-SureFire) 2018
- Casualty (Billy Lawler) 2016
- Nostalgic EP (Billy Lawler) 2016
- Epic Boxing (ESPN Theme) 2013
