= Robert Wilson (music entrepreneur) =

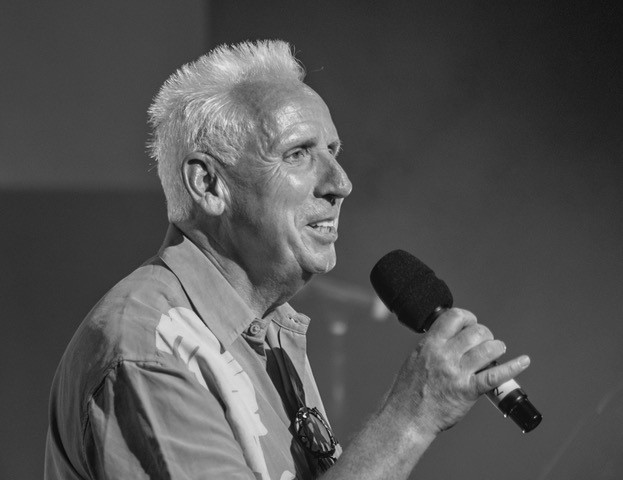
Robert Wilson MBE

Robert Allan David Wilson, MBE, born in 1951 in the Scottish Borders, is an entrepreneurial business leader, musician and philanthropist. He went to Rutherglen Academy in Glasgow and Hawick High School. Wilson lives in Knebworth, Hertfordshire, and was awarded an MBE in the 2016 Queen's New Years Honours for services to the music industry and charity.

== Music Industry ==
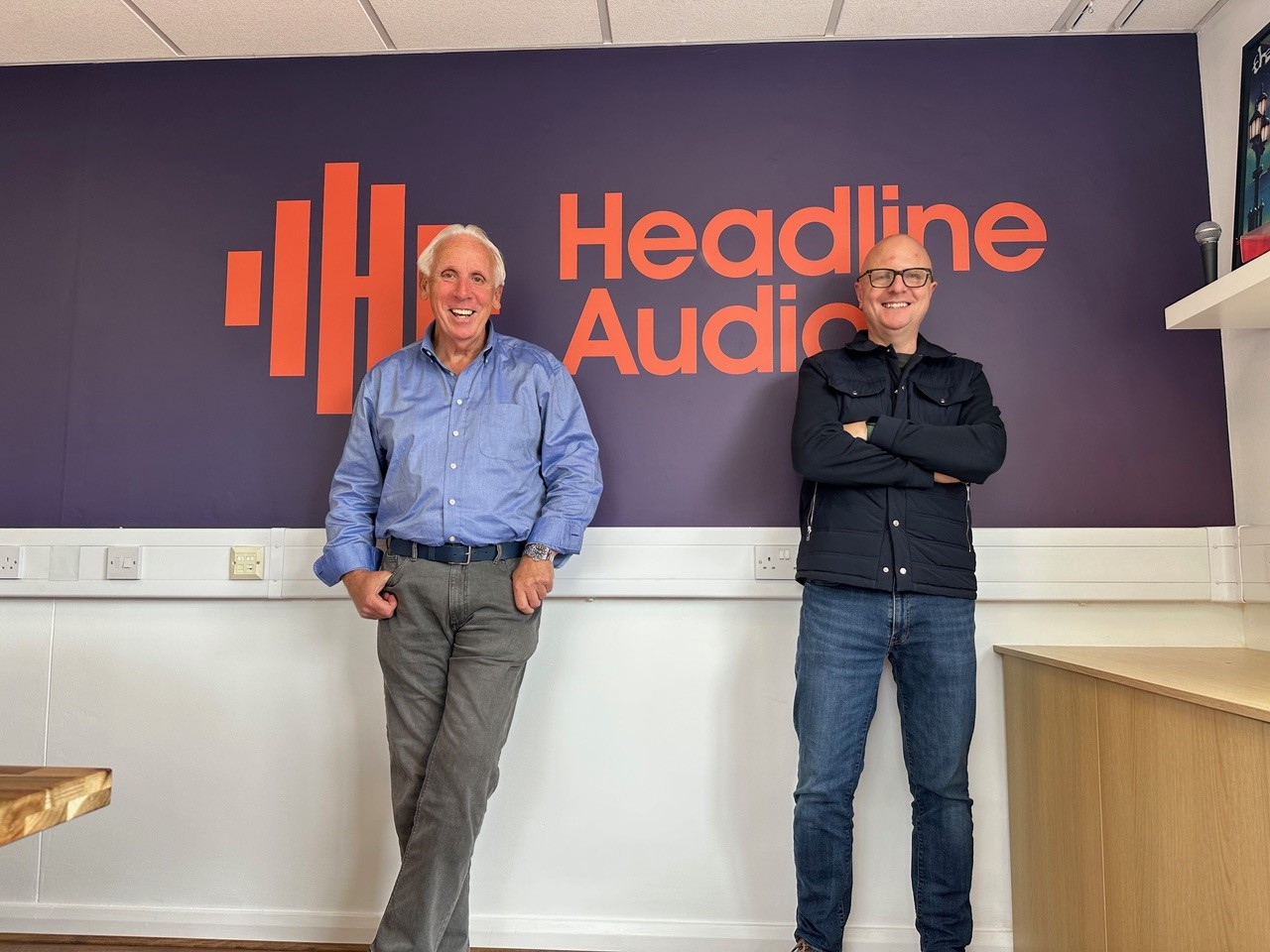
Robert Wilson with Headline Audio Managing Director Greg Niven

Since 2023, Wilson has served as Chairman of Headline Audio, a distributor based in Milton Keynes that distributes Nord keyboards and Solid State Logic (SSL) products in the UK and Ireland. Founded in Sweden in 1983, Nord is known for its high-quality, innovative digital keyboards, including the Nord Stage, Nord Electro, and Nord Grand, which are widely used by musicians in various genres around the world. SSL, headquartered in Oxford, manufactures professional tools for music, live sound, and broadcast.

Robert Wilson MBE founded Sound Technology Ltd in February 1978, where he served as Chairman until May 2018. Under his leadership, Sound Technology Ltd became one of the largest independent distributors of musical instruments, professional audio products and lighting in the UK and the Republic of Ireland.

For over 40 years, Wilson also served as a Director of the Music Industries Association (MIA), the UK’s trade association for musical instrument and related product businesses. His contributions were recognized in 2003, and he received a Lifetime Achievement Award in 2006. He retired from MIA in 2019.

Wilson continues to play an important part in supporting the music industry.

In 2024 Wilson appeared on Antiques Roadshow with a painting of Lauder Castle, reflecting his appreciation for art and history.

== Charity work ==
Wilson was a Director of Music for Youth, a national youth arts charity, from 1980 to April 2017. He also served as a Director of the National Association of Music Merchants (NAMM) from 2008 to 2011 and contributed to the NAMM Oral History project in 2005 and 2018, receiving the NAMM Oral History Service Award.

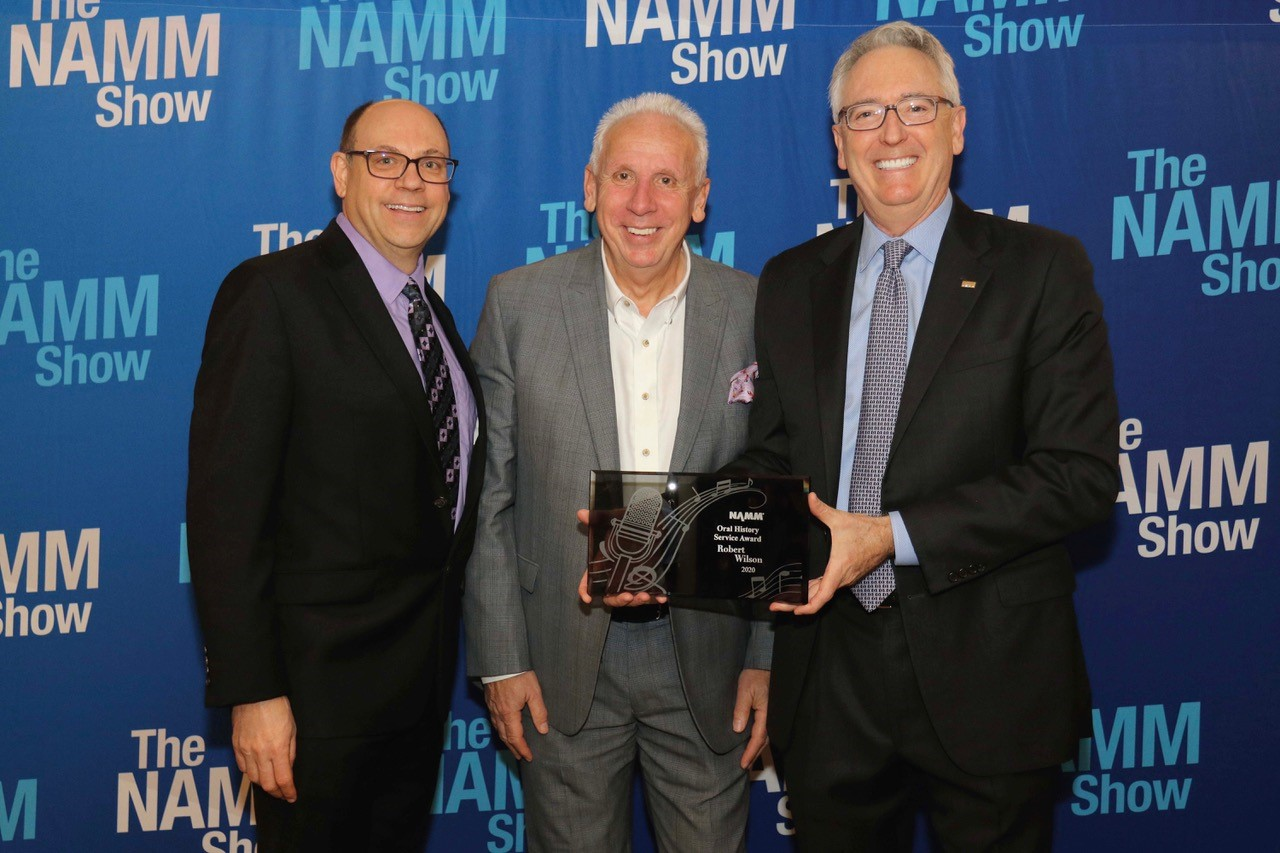
Robert Wilson receives NAMM award Anaheim CA 2020.
