= Al Siniscal =

Audio engineer, Parnelli Award winner

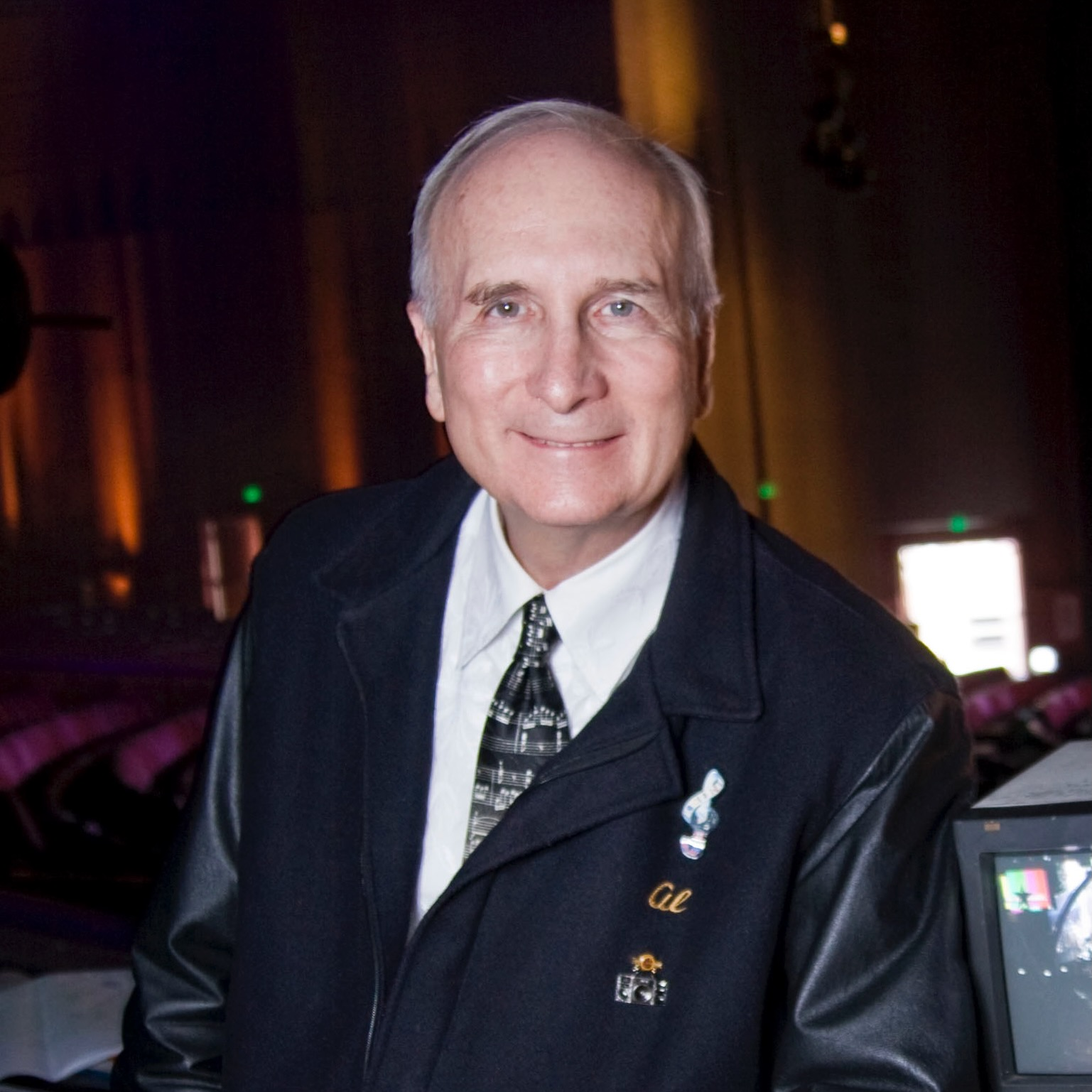
- Siniscal at A-1 Audio in 2010
- Born: July 6, 1941 (age 85); St. Louis, Missouri, U.S.
- Citizenship: American
- Education: Washington University, (BS Engineering, MBA)
- Occupations: Audio Engineer, Sound Systems Designer and Entrepreneur
- Awards: Parnelli Audio Innovator Award (2010)

Albert V. Siniscal (born July 6, 1941) is an American audio engineer, sound systems designer and entrepreneur. He founded A-1 Audio, a sound reinforcement company based in Hollywood, California. He received the 2010 Parnelli Lifetime Achievement Award for Audio Innovation.

== Early life and education ==
Siniscal was born in St. Louis, Missouri, and graduated from Chaminade High School. In 1959, he received a scholarship to Washington University in St. Louis, where he earned a Bachelor's Degree in Engineering and a Master of Business Administration (MBA). He joined the USAF ROTC program and later served as a First Lieutenant in the USAF Missiles and Space Systems Division.

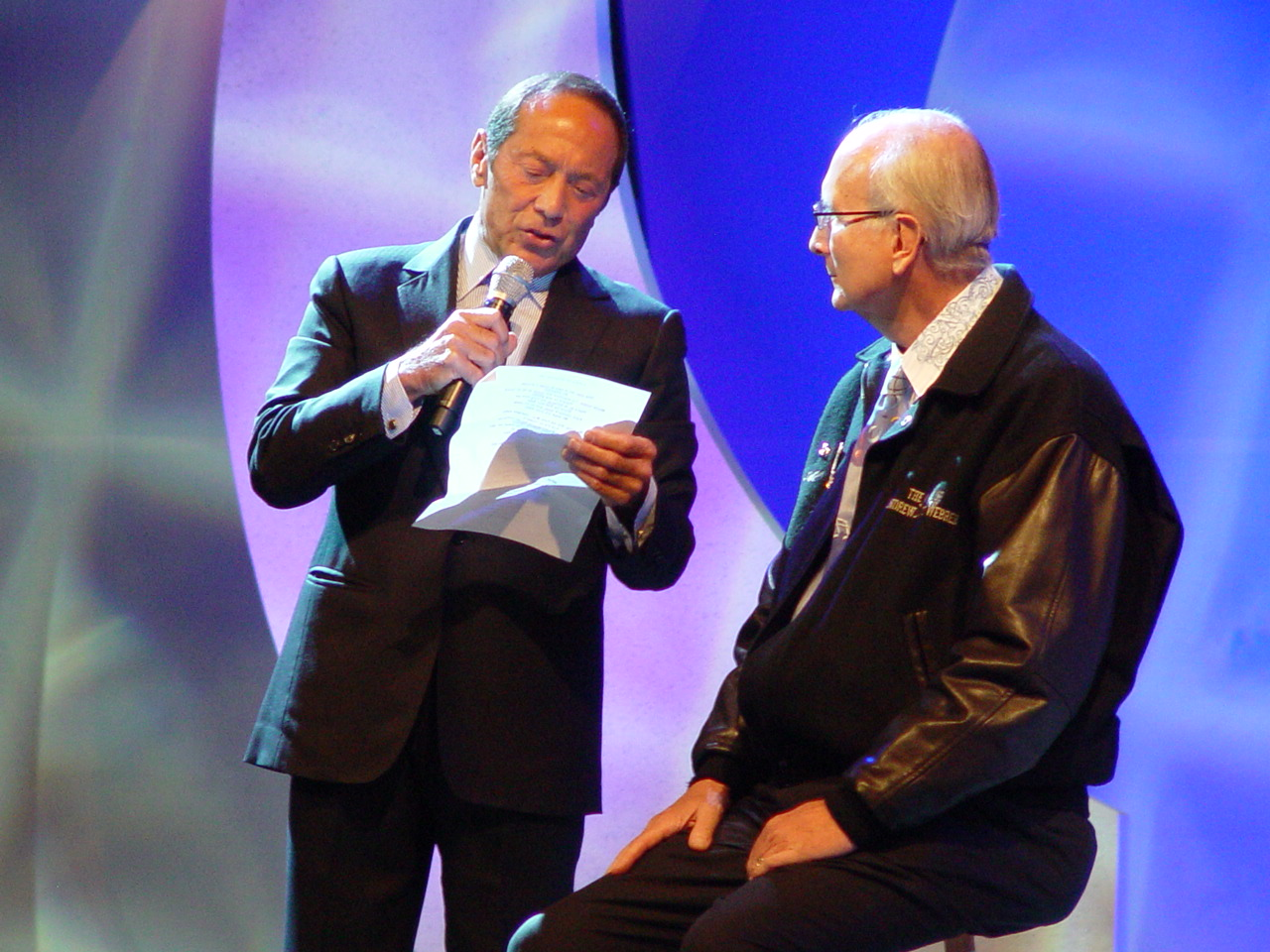
Paul Anka (left) with Al Siniscal at Parnelli Awards Ceremony

== Career ==
=== Early work ===
After working for Esso International (now ExxonMobil) in New York City, Siniscal was called to active duty at Hill Air Force Base in Ogden, Utah, where he was assigned to the Minuteman Missile program. During off-duty time, he worked on electronic projects including amplifier cards and recording consoles. After his honorable discharge from the Air Force in 1969, he moved to Hollywood, California to pursue work in professional audio systems.

Siniscal began building consoles and speakers, developing systems that integrated amplifiers directly into loudspeaker enclosures. In 1971, he authored an article on bi-amplification and tri-amplification in Recording Engineer/Producer magazine.

In 1972, Siniscal presented a technical paper titled "High-Intensity, Modular Tri- and Quad-Amplification Loudspeaker Systems" at the Audio Engineering Society (AES) Convention in Munich, Germany, and repeated the presentation at the US AES Convention in Los Angeles, California. The paper was later referenced in historical reviews of professional audio power amplifiers and loudspeaker systems.

=== A-1 Audio ===
Siniscal founded A-1 Audio, which operated from a 20,000 sq.ft. building in Hollywood. By 1974, he had developed the VIP system (Vertical Integrated Power), featuring tri-amplified, self-powered enclosures. A-1 Audio provided sound systems for Las Vegas showroom performers including Paul Anka, Wayne Newton, Barry Manilow, and Engelbert Humperdinck.

Siniscal's touring system designs were featured in the October 1978 issue of Recording Engineer/Producer magazine in an article about The Doobie Brothers' touring system. As concert tours required more portable systems, Siniscal developed methods for packaging complete sound reinforcement systems into two tractor-trailer trucks.

In January 1980, A-1 Audio provided the sound system for Frank Sinatra's concert at Rio de Janeiro's Maracanã Stadium, which set a Guinness World Record for largest one-man concert attendance by a solo performer with 175,000 attendees.

During the 1980s, A-1 Audio provided sound systems for Broadway productions including "Starlight Express" and theater productions including "The Wiz." The company also provided sound systems for Pope John Paul II's visit to Los Angeles 1987 visit to Dodger Stadium and the 1988 Depeche Mode "Concert for the Masses" at the Pasadena Rose Bowl. In 1985, A-1 Audio was nominated for a TEC Award in the Sound Reinforcement Company category.

In 1989, Siniscal worked with sound designer Martin Levan to supply sound systems for "The Music of Andrew Lloyd Webber," a touring concert that played in more than 30 US cities in 1990.

In late 1992, A-1 Audio acquired the US assets, staff, and clients of Tasco Sound Ltd, a U.K. company, which included sound and lighting systems for concert tours, thereby increasing its inventory of rental equipment.

In 1999, A-1 Audio was acquired by Production Resource Group (PRG), where Siniscal remained as a consultant. He later founded A1 Entertainment Services in Las Vegas and worked on installations including the concert hall at the Aladdin Resort & Casino (now Planet Hollywood).

Siniscal is a Registered Professional Electrical Engineer in Nevada and California.

== Recognition ==
In 2010, Siniscal received the Parnelli Lifetime Achievement Award for Audio Innovation.He was interviewed for the NAMM Oral History Program in 2010. He is also profiled in the NAMM Oral History Program.
