= Lenise Bent =

American audio engineer

- Born: September 11, 1953 (age 73)
- Origin: United States
- Genres: Rock, Pop
- Occupations: Engineer, producer
- Years active: 1976–present

Lenise Diane Bent is an American audio engineer who has worked in both the music and film industry. She was one of a handful of women working in the Hollywood recording studio business in a technical role during the 1970s, and was the first woman to receive an RIAA Platinum album for her engineering of AutoAmerican by Blondie.

== Early years ==
Bent grew up in Los Angeles. At age 8, Bent and her brother were in the Screen Children's Guild and worked as an extra for tv and film. She later recalled being "more fascinated with the process and the production [...] as opposed to the acting." Her family was musical, and her eldest brother often brought home gear to repair from his job at an electronics store. She owned her first tape recorder before her 8th birthday. Bent studied piano and flute and made her first recording at 9 years old (with the Compton Youth Festival Orchestra). Growing up, she was interested in seeing films and watching live music.

Bent studied Film & TV and radio production at the University of Southern California (USC) and California State Long Beach. She then studied audio engineering at SoundMasters Recording School, which was one of the only recording schools at the time.

== Music career ==
Bent worked as an assistant engineer at The Village Recorders studio in Los Angeles. She was hired in August 1976 and was one of four women on engineering staff. Her credits included Aja by Steely Dan; Breakfast in America by Supertramp; Tusk by Fleetwood Mac. She worked her way up to engineer (her first session in April 1977) and became chief engineer for Mike Chapman. She engineered AutoAmerican by Blondie and other of Chapman's artists such as The Knack and Suzi Quatro. Bent engineered at other major studios such as United Western, The Record Plant, and Air London. She is known for being the first woman to receive an RIAA Platinum album for engineering (for AutoAmerican by Blondie). Bent is also recognized for being one of a handful of women working in the Hollywood recording studio business (in a technical role) during the 1970s.

For Aja, Bent studied Steely Dan's previous albums (including who played on them and engineered). She says that level of study paid off. One of her mentors was the engineer on that album, Roger Nichols. She learned from Donald Fagen to make things right versus making things perfect.

Bent moved into post-production (for film and television) but continues to work on music. In 2016, she recorded an all analog album with the band The Barrelhouse Kings. 2018, she recorded Primal King's self-titled album at United Recordings using all analog equipment.

When asked, "What is the key to recording a great sound?" Bent replied, "Capturing the performance the best way you possibly can, meaning using the right mic for that instrument or voice, put in the right place. And I prefer to work quickly while the energy is up."

Her favorite pre-amps are Neve 1073 and Neumann U67 is her favorite mic.

== Post-production career ==
Bent moved into post-production sound where she worked as a sound editor, sound supervisor and re-recording mixer. She has worked on music, voice-over, ADR and Foley. Bent has produced vocals and dialog for the foreign language versions of the films Shrek, Spirit, and Shrek 2.

== Professional affiliations ==
- The Recording Academy
- Audio Engineering Society (Governor 2025, Executive Committee of the LA Section 2017-2019)
- The Blues Foundation
- P&E Wing of the Recording Academy
- Women in Music; Los Angeles Chapter
- Hollywood Sapphire Group
- Women's Audio Mission (WAM)
- Bent was a presenter at the 30th Annual NAMM TEC Awards.
- Bent was a presenter at the 2020 NAMM "SoundGirls Mentoring in Recording Arts With Leslie Ann Jones" (alongside Jett Galindo, Fela Davis and Catharine Wood)
