= Laura B. Whitmore =

American singer-songwriter

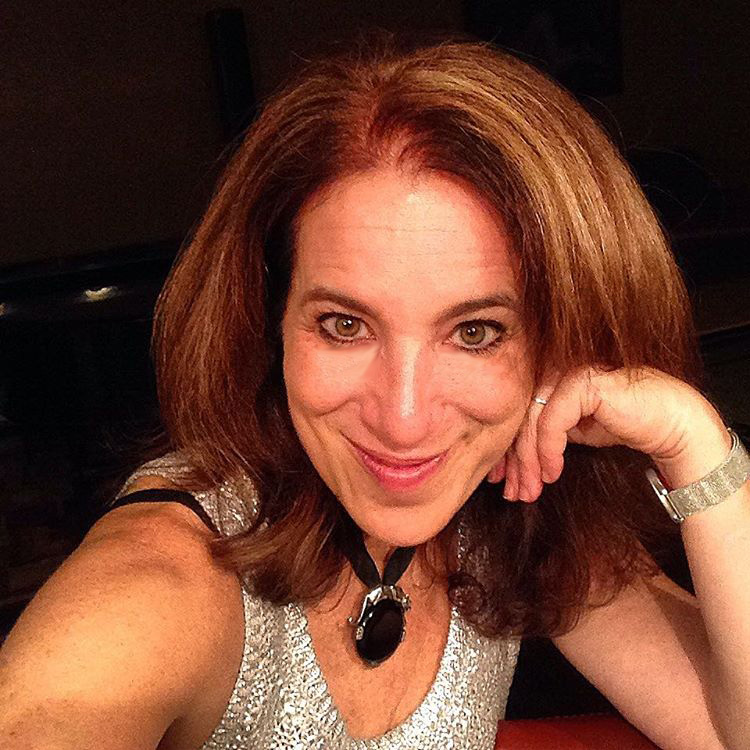
- Whitmore in 2015
- Born: March 11, 1965 (age 61); Framingham, MA, U.S.
- Known for: Mad Sun Marketing; The Women's International Music Network (The WiMN); The She Rocks Awards; BackStory Events
- Website: mad-sun.com thewimn.com backstoryevents.com

Laura B. Whitmore (born March 11, 1965) is an American music marketer, singer/songwriter, event producer, and founder of the Women’s International Music Network (The WiMN). She currently lives in New York, NY.

== Early life ==
Whitmore was born in Framingham, Massachusetts. She attended Hofstra University, earning a B.S. in 1986 in Music Merchandising, where she was honored by Pi Kappa Lambda. In 1999 she earned her M.B.A. in Marketing also from Hofstra where she was invited to be a member of Beta Gamma Sigma. She also completed a certificate program at Audio Recording Technology Institute (ARTI) in New York City.

== Career ==
While in college Whitmore worked for the Nassau Symphony Orchestra on Long Island, New York, computerizing their systems and renovating their operations. After graduating in 1986, Whitmore worked in the direct marketing department of CBS Records under the Senior VP of Direct Marketing, Neal Keating, who was credited as a marketing pioneer as he spearheaded the formation of the Columbia House record club. In 1988 Whitmore left CBS Records to join Korg USA as a marketing assistant and artist relations representative. and later became a Marketing Services Specialist with the responsibilities of media planning and negotiation, public relations, and trade show planning. After earning her master's degree in 1999, she became Marketing Services Manager. In addition to handling marketing, PR and artist relations for the Korg, Marshall, and VOX brands, Whitmore was appointed editor of Korg’s ProView Magazine and of the VOX Catalog, for which she won a Davey Award in 2006.

In 2008 after 20 years with Korg, Whitmore moved to Lafayette, California and launched her own business, Mad Sun Marketing, which specializes in marketing, public relations, artist relations, event production, and graphic design for music and audio companies. Beginning with just two clients, Korg USA and Academic Superstore, Mad Sun's client list would later include 65amps, Acoustic Amplification, Agile Partners, Colby Amplifiers, Dean Markley USA, EarthSync, Gear Collector, Jammit, KVRaudio, Muse Research, MusicFirst, NewBay Media, Notion Music, Peavey Electronics, SIR Entertainment Services, SIR Stage37, SoundTree, Sterling Audio, and the film 'Take Me To The River.'

Whitmore is the creator of the Guitar World Magazine blog series, Guitar Girl’d, which launched in May 2011. In October 2013, Whitmore became the editor of Guitar World Magazine's AcousticNation.com, a channel of GuitarWorld.com that focuses on acoustic music. She hosted a series of events and panels at the NAMM Summer Session in Nashville in July 2014 as the editor and sponsor of the Acoustic Nation Stage. During that event she also hosted a showcase for female singer/songwriters for the Women's International Music Network.

Whitmore organized the first annual Women’s Music Summit which took place in Upstate New York at Full Moon Resort on August 27–31, 2012. The event featured Meshell Ndegeocello, Melissa Auf der Maur, Malina Moye and Marnie Stern as guest speakers and performers and provided workshops for female musicians.

In November 2012, Whitmore founded The Women's International Music Network (The WiMN). The goal of the organization is to provide support, information, and a sense of community for women in all walks of the industry, including performers, business insiders, educators and students. Beginning in 2013, the WiMN has hosted the She Rocks Awards to recognize women in the music industry, from major musicians to behind-the-scenes professionals.

In June 2012 as part of MakeMusic NY, Whitmore co-produced a "group guitar jam" called Mass Appeal Guitars, where hundreds of guitarists played together in Union Square, New York City. Whitmore lead the song "What's Up" by 4 Non Blondes. The event featured the premiere performance of a music group led by guitarist Alex Skolnick called Planetary Coalition. Skolnick closed the event by leading the song "Smoke on the Water." Whitmore again co-produced the event for 2013 and lead the song "Ho Hey" by the Lumineers. Whitmore invited rock vocalist MilitiA. of the band Judas Priestess to complete the playalong, who closed the event with "Living After Midnight." She produced the event again in 2014, which brought the largest audience yet out to Union Square Park for the group jam. Artists Alex Skolnick and the NYC group Wise Girl performed. Whitmore led the song "The Only Exception" by Paramore.

While residing in Lafayette, California, Whitmore was also co-host of a monthly open mic series as part of the West Coast Songwriters Association.

In November 2014, Whitmore came on board as the education director for Take Me to the River, a documentary film which celebrates the intergenerational and interracial musical influence of Memphis in the face of pervasive discrimination and segregation. The film brings multiple generations of award-winning Memphis and Mississippi Delta musicians together, following them through the creative process of recording a historic new album, to re-imagine the utopia of racial, gender and generational collaboration of Memphis in its heyday. The education initiative partnered with Berklee College of Music to produce a curriculum and events based on the film.

In May 2015 Whitmore and former Guitar World editor Brad Tolinski formed BackStory, a live interview event series that began by streaming on aol.com as part of the AOL Build series. In 2016 they began to independently produce the series from New York City venues like The Cutting Room and Sony Hall with media partners like Guitar World and Parade, producing interviews with iconic musicians including Ringo Starr, Jon Anderson, Shinedown, John Oates, Nile Rodgers, Joe Satriani, Warren Haynes, The Zombies, Colbie Cailat, Amy Lee, and Ace Frehley. In 2017 she became the music contributor for Parade.com.

In April 2020 Whitmore became the Vice President of Marketing for Positive Grid, a music technology software and hardware company. Later that same year she was named Senior Vice President of Marketing for that company.

== Other projects ==
Whitmore is a songwriter who has participated in several online workshops presented by Berklee College of Music. She writes and performs regularly and was previously in a band called Summer Music Project. As a soloist, she has collaborated with Collective Soul guitarist, Joel Kosche. In February 2012 she recorded the original song "Don't Take it Easy" on the John Lennon Educational Tour bus, which resulted in a video recording featured on GuitarWorld.com

She has hosted and moderated several workshops and panels at events such as NAMM and SXSW on the topics of marketing, PR, apps and music making, and songwriting.

In April 2015 Whitmore was selected as the commencement speaker for McNally Smith College of Music, and gave an address focusing on her varied history in the music business. The same year she launched a series of house concerts under the name Acoustic Kitchen, starting with guests Will Dailey and Jenna Paone, and then streaming live on twitch.tv/acoustickitchen with guest Ali Handal.

In 2016 she toured with Ali Handal and Laura Clapp under the name She 3. In 2018 Whitmore partnered with singer/songwriter Jenna Paone to write and create the project, Girl, the album.
