= Parnelli Awards =

Annual awards for live event professionals and technicians

- Country: United States
- Established: 2001
- Website: https://parnelliawards.com

The Parnelli Awards are annual honors recognizing excellence, innovation, and leadership in the live event and concert touring industry. The awards acknowledge individuals, companies, and technologies that contribute significantly to touring productions and live events.

== History ==
The Parnelli Awards were established in 2001 by tour manager Patrick Stansfield and Terry Lowe, founder of the trade publications Front of House Magazine (FOH) and Projection, Lights & Staging News (PLSN). The first awards ceremony was held as a small industry dinner in Southern California. Over time, it expanded into a formal annual event recognizing achievements across multiple disciplines in live production.

The awards are named in honor of Rick “Parnelli” O’Brien, a respected figure in the concert touring industry known for his work in production logistics and artist touring support, who died of cancer in 1999.

== Comparable awards ==
The Parnelli Awards are distinct from artist-focused honors such as the Grammy Awards, which recognize musical performances and recordings. Instead, the Parnelli Awards focus on the behind-the-scenes professionals in lighting, staging, sound and production management responsible for live touring and events.

The awards are most closely related to the TEC Awards, which recognize technical achievement in audio and production across live performance, recordings, and broadcast media. Both awards are presented annually in conjunction with the NAMM Show.

== Award categories ==
The Parnelli Awards include a variety of categories reflecting the multidisciplinary nature of live event production. These categories honor technical roles, creative leadership, and organizational excellence. Typical award categories include:

- Lifetime Achievement Award
- Audio Innovator Award
- Visionary Award
- Production Manager of the Year
- Production Designer of the Year
- Lighting Company of the Year
- Sound Company of the Year
- FOH Audio Engineer of the Year
- Monitor Engineer of the Year
- NextGen Award (emerging professionals)

== Selection process ==
The first 3 awards, collectively known as the Lifetime Achievement honors, are selected by the Parnelli Board of Advisors and announced prior to the NAMM Show. The other awards use a two-stage process. Nominations are submitted annually by industry professionals, after which entries are verified and reviewed by the Board of Advisors. Finalists are then voted on by verified subscribers of FOH and PLSN magazines via a secure ballot system.

== Ceremony ==
Since 2016, the Parnelli Awards ceremony has been held in January of each year in conjunction with the annual NAMM Show in Anaheim, California. The event serves as a major industry gathering for touring professionals, technicians, and production companies. The awards have been described by industry commentators as the Grammys for live event personnel who work behind the scenes at concerts, tours and special events.

Music entertainers have attended and presented at the awards ceremony as a recognition of the work being done by the award winners on their behalf. Over the years, Garth Brooks, Todd Rungren, Kenny Chesney, Brooks & Dunn, Paul Anka, Alice Cooper, Adrien Belew, Tony Levin and Kevin Cronin have attended the awards event.

== Past award winners ==
Parnelli Awards – career achievement honorees
Year	Lifetime Achievement Award	Audio Innovator Award	Visionary Award
2001	Brian Croft		
2002	Mike Brown		
2003	Chip Monck		
2004	Bob See	John Meyer	
2005	Patrick Stansfield	Bruce Jackson	
2006	Jere Harris	Bill Hanley	
2007	Gerry Stickells	Bob Heil	
2008	Dennis Sheehan	Roy & Gene Clair	Michael Tait
2009	Jake Berry	Stan Miller	Richard Belliveau
2010	Randy "Baja" Fletcher	Al Siniscal	Jim Bornhorst
2011	Ed Wannebo	Kenton Forsythe	Jim Fackert
2012	Charlie Hernandez	Dave Shadoan; Ross Ritto	Joe Branam
2013	George Travis	Mark Engebretson	Eric Pearce
2014	Benny Collins	Bob Goldstein	Howard Ungerleider
2015	Chris Lamb	Pat Quilter	David Cunningham
2016	Richard Fernandez	Greg Mackie	Danny O'Bryen
2018	Bobby Thrasher	John Stadius	Jonathan Smeeton
2019	Chris Adamson	Brock Adamson	Yvan Miron
2020	Mark "Springo" Spring	Karrie Keyes	Michael Strickland
2021	David Bernstein	Sam Berkow	Peter Morse
2022	Roy Lamb	Marty Garcia	Keny Whitright
2023	Jim Brammer	Buford Jones	Carol Dodds
2024	Malcolm Weldon	Dave Rat	Roy Bickel
2025	Marty Hom	Michael Laiacona	Marc Brickman
2026	Bernie Boyle	Christian Heil	Rocky Paulson

The Audio Innovator Award was introduced in 2004 and the Visionary Award in 2008.

Winners in the other award categories can be found on the Parnelli Awards website.

Many of the Parnelli Award recipients are profiled in the NAMM Oral History Program.

== See also ==
- Live sound mixing
- Live event support
- NAMM Show
