= Karrie Keyes =

- Born: December 2, 1967 (age 58)
- Origin: United States
- Genres: Rock, Punk Rock
- Years active: 1986–present

Karrie Keyes is an American audio engineer and the executive director of SoundGirls, a non-profit organization that supports women in the sound industry. She has been the monitor engineer for Pearl Jam and Eddie Vedder for over 25 years and has toured with Soundgarden, Fugazi, Sonic Youth, Neil Young, and the Red Hot Chili Peppers. Keyes was one of very few women working as a live sound engineer in the 1980s and is recognized for her contributions to helping women in the sound industry (which is estimated to be 95% men). She was a 2017 honoree of the She Rocks Awards.

== Youth ==
Keyes was born and raised in Los Angeles. She would "fall in love" with songs she heard on the radio. She took music lessons from third grade to middle school (playing flute and clarinet) and gravitated towards the arts and music in high school. She was a fan of music who attended concerts and shows. In high school, she wasn't presented with career options in the music industry. She aspired to be a writer and to travel the world.

Keyes was a fan of punk music as a teenager. At 17, she was taking some classes at a community college and worked a part-time job in retail.

== Early Industry Years ==
Her first opportunity in sound came when she met sound engineer Dave Rat in 1986 at a Black Flag show on the In My Head tour. She was 17 at the time. Keyes worked her way to the front before the show and talked to Rat. He invited Keyes to the stage after the show and taught her how to wrap mic cables. The next day, she was in Palo Alto with Black Flag and knew she wanted to do sound.

Dave Rat owned a sound company, Rat Sound, and brought Keyes to work for him. Her first job was loading and unloading PA equipment from trucks at shows. She learned how to set up sound systems, do wiring and set change, how the gear worked, and troubleshooting. Rat Sound did a lot of punk rock shows in Southern California and the two did most shows themselves (with the occasional third person). Keyes was able to quit her part-time job and not go back to school.

She was taking any job offered from punk music to gospel to mariachi.

Keyes and Rat lived in a warehouse without hot water for two years so they could put money back into the business (for expenses like equipment, insurance and gas). She worked for Rat Sound from 1986 to 2005. In addition to sound work, she helped with accounting and bills and in her final five years, HR and management.

== Monitor Engineer ==
In her career, Keyes has primarily worked as a monitor engineer.

Her first tour was with The Untouchables working as a system tech for their Southern California gigs. When their front of house engineer left, she moved into mixing monitors for them until 1990. Keyes was monitor engineer for The Red Hot Chili Peppers who she toured with from 1990 to 2000. She met Pearl Jam in 1991 when they were opening for RHCP on the Blood Sugar Sex Magic Tour.

In 1995, Keyes toured with Neil Young on the Mirror Ball Tour. She was hired to tour with Fugazi because she did their location shows regularly and knew what they needed.

Keyes says monitor mixing is "not for the weak of heart." She says it's considered one of the most difficult jobs on tour.

== Pearl Jam ==
Pearl Jam hired Keyes in 1992 to finish their tour, which she did between RHCP tours. Keyes said the crew is like family because of how long they have been together.

As of 2016, the band uses a mix of in-ear monitors and wedges (Rat S Wedges for Eddie Vedder and EAW Microwedges for the rest of the band). The lead guitar player (Mike McCready) relies mainly on in-ear monitors. Keyes uses a DiGiCo SD5 console for their shows.

Some Pearl Jam fans recognize her as the "microphone girl" because she is on stage checking mics before the show begins.

== SoundGirls ==
Keyes co-founded SoundGirls in 2013 with Michelle Sabolchick Pettinato with the mission of "empowering the next generation of women in audio." SoundGirls is looking to increase the number of women in the workforce, which is currently at 5 percent.

Keyes and Sabolchick met when they were on a panel together at the 2012 AES Convention in San Francisco. The panel was hosted by the Women's Audio Mission called "Women of Professional Concert Sound" and was moderated by Terri Winston, the founder of WAM. The five panelists had never met before but found a lot of similarities in their experiences, work ethics and interests. They also recognized they had hadn't crossed paths or been able to support each other but they bonded "like sisters." Keyes and Pettinato decided to do something after. The original idea of Soundgirls was to create a website where women in audio could meet and network.

Since then, SoundGirls has grown to over 4,000 members and chapters worldwide. The organization assists with mentorships, job placement, workshops, and scholarships. The organization is inclusive of all genders and non-conforming genders. Keyes is currently the executive director and runs the organization on a daily basis.

In 2015, SoundGirls started holding recording camps in the summer for girls. These events are held in California, New York, Philadelphia, and St. Louis.

In 2018, SoundGirls teamed up with Spotify to create the EQL Directory, an international database for women working in audio and music production.

Keyes says of women in the industry, "Women must work harder, smarter, and be tougher, and by being those things is how you overcome adversity. Since starting SoundGirls I have learned that the issues women face are not limited to women; it affects all marginalized people. The industry needs diversity."

== Personal life ==
Keyes and Dave Rat had twin daughters in 1997 and Keyes toured while pregnant. They continued to work together professionally for many years.

The two tried to balance their tour schedules as much as possible and Keyes likened it to a military family where a parent may be gone for months at a time. She says of being a working mom, ""It took me probably till they were three or four to actually come to terms with, 'You know what, I'm actually a better mother if I'm doing what I love doing.' So that when I'm here, I'm completely here."

Keyes has been based in California for most of her career but lived in Seattle briefly during the Grunge era. One of her daughters has worked on the Warped Tour.

== Awards ==
Keyes was an honoree at the 2017 She Rocks Awards at the NAMM Show in Anaheim, CA. The She Rocks awards honors women who stand out within the music industry.

In 2019, Keyes won the audio innovator award for her work with soundgirls at the Parnelli Awards.
