= Hawick High School =

Coordinates: 55.4215°N 2.7942°W

Location
- Buccleuch Street; Hawick, Borders, TD9 0EG; Scotland

Information
- Type: Secondary School
- Motto: Honesty; Equality; Ambition; Responsibility; Determination
- Religious affiliation: Non-denominational
- Established: 17th century
- Local authority: Scottish Borders Council
- Headteacher: Lisa Scott
- Staff: ~100
- Gender: Mixed
- Age: 11 to 18
- Enrolment: 807 (in 2018)
- Colours: Navy (S1-3), Purple (S4), Green (S5), Red (S6),
- School years: S1-S6
- Website: https://blogs.glowscotland.org.uk/sb/hawickhs/

Hawick High School is a non-denominational secondary school in Hawick, in the Scottish Borders. As well as serving the town, it also takes in pupils from as far away as Newcastleton. It is the second school in Scotland (after Kilmarnock Academy) to have educated two Nobel laureates: Angus Deaton and Richard Henderson. Hawick High School is part of the Hawick cluster of schools including Burnfoot Community School, Denholm Primary School (in the Village of Denholm), Drumlanrig St Cuthberts Primary School, Newcastleton Primary School (in the village of Newcastleton), Stirches Primary School, Trinity Primary School, and Wilton Primary School.

== History ==
The first mention of educational provision in the area was in the 17th century. The first evidence of a specific school was in 1711 when Hawick Grammar School was established by Reverend Alexander Orrock although the building was not actually completed until 1732. The school combined with a nearby elementary school in 1824 and a new school was completed two years later. This school proved too small and another school was built in 1860 on the same site that the school occupies today.

In 1908 the school was renovated and its name changed to Buccleuch School. The name changed again in 1915 to Hawick Higher Grade School. The school was destroyed by a fire in December 1925 and students were instead taught in the church while it was rebuilt. It was completed in 1928. There were further renovations in the 1970s when an extension was built, in the 1990s when the school was modernised and in 2003 when the canteen was renovated. In 2016 the headteacher was suspended. The headteacher of Berwickshire High School filled in the position until Vicky Porteous was appointed in July 2017. Vicky Porteous remained in post until she stood down in November 2022. Lisa Scott became Acting Headteacher before being appointed Headteacher in November 2023.

In September 2021, it was announced that a new circa £49 million will be built to replace the current school on its existing site by 2027.

== Notable alumni ==
- Brian Balfour-Oatts (born 1966), international art dealer, writer and philanthropist
- Sir Angus Deaton (born 1945), economist, winner of the 2015 Nobel Memorial Prize in Economic Sciences; left the school when awarded a foundation scholarship to Fettes College
- Nigel Griffiths (born 1955), Labour Party politician, Member of Parliament (MP) for Edinburgh South 1987–2010
- Richard Henderson (born 1945), molecular biologist, winner of the 2017 Nobel Prize in Chemistry
- Stuart Hogg (born 1992) Scottish rugby player for Exeter and Scotland
- Tony Stanger (born 1968) Scottish international rugby player: previous record try-scorer until passed by Stuart Hogg in November 2021
- Sir Robert Muir (1864–1959) pathologist
- Andrew Cranston (born 1969), artist
- Robert Wilson MBE (born 1951), music industry entrepreneur
- Sir David Wallace (born 1945), physicist
- Darcy Graham (born 1997), Edinburgh and Scotland rugby player.
- Lisa Thomson (born 1997), Scottish Women’s rugby player and GB 7s player.
- Lana Skeldon (born 1993), Scottish professional rugby player.
- Alison Suttie, Baroness Suttie (born 1968), British Liberal Democrat politician. Appointed as a life peer in the House of Lords in September 2013.
- Rory Sutherland (born 1992), Scottish international rugby player.
