= Front of House (magazine) =

- Editor-in-Chief: George Petersen
- Categories: Trade magazine
- Frequency: Monthly
- Total circulation: 22,695 (2018)
- First issue: October 2002
- Country: USA
- Based in: Las Vegas, Nevada
- Language: English
- Website: fohonline.com
- ISSN: 1549-831X
- OCLC: 54902438

Front of House or FOH magazine (named for Front of House) is a magazine for live audio professionals and manufacturers of pro audio equipment, published by Timeless Communications, Corp. of Nevada (which also publishes a live production magazine about theater, Stage Directions, Projection, Lights & Staging News for visual presentation, Musical Merchandise review for the musical instrument industry, School Band & Orchestra for music educators, JAZZed for jazz educators and Choral Director). FOH comes in digital and print format and is available free of charge to qualified professionals, enthusiasts, and students of event audio. The magazine provides information on digital and live sound consoles, amplifiers, processors, microphones, speakers, trade shows, major concert/production tours, theatre, installations and industry news.

FOH's editor is George Petersen, former editor of Mix magazine.

Timeless Communications, Corp was founded by Timeless president Terry Lowe in 1999. FOH was the second magazine published by TCC premiering in October 2002.

FOH presents the annual Parnelli Awards, along with its sister publication Projection, Lights & Staging News. These awards honor lifetime achievements in the entertainment technology industry as well as current practitioners whose works were outstanding in the preceding 12-month period. Lifetime achievement winners are selected by a board of advisers and yearly awards are nominated and voted on by the readers of the magazine. The Parnelli Awards were named after Rick "Parnelli" O'Brien a beloved production manager in the industry.

Sister magazine Projection, Lights & Staging News reports on theatrical and concert lighting as well as large format video and projection for entertainment in the same formats.
