= Grune =

Grune is a German surname derived either from a nickname or after a dwelling place literally meaning "green", from Middle High German gruone, grūne. Notable people with the surnage include:

- Dick Grune
- Karl Grune
- Richard Grune
