= Sam Ash Music =

American musical instrument retailer

Sam Ash Music Corp.
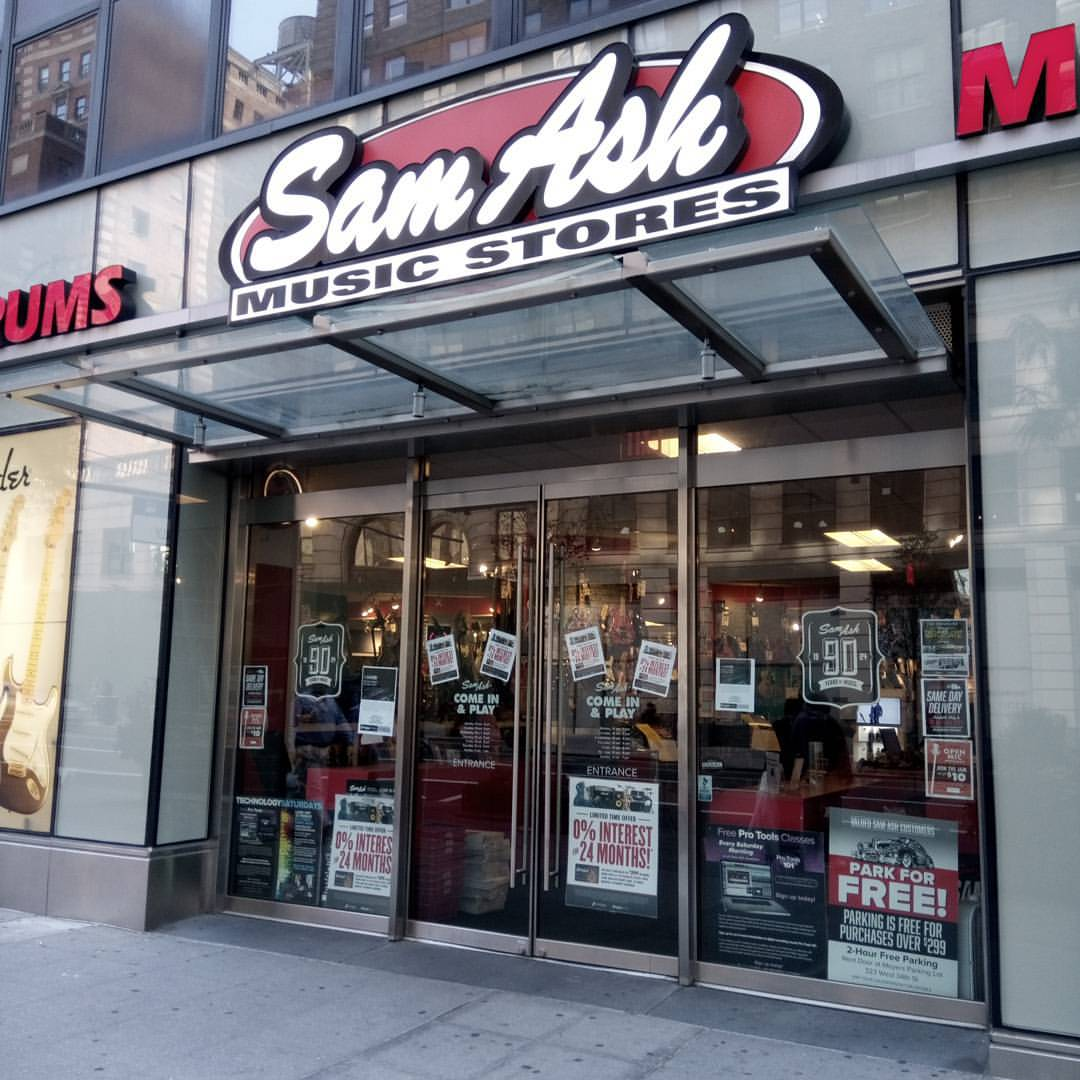
- Type: Private
- Industry: Musical instruments
- Founded: 1924; 102 years ago
- Founder: Sam Ash
- Defunct: 2024
- Fate: Liquidation
- Headquarters: Hicksville, New York
- Number of locations: 27 (by May 2024)
- Products: Musical instruments, Recording equipment and accessories
- Revenue: $360M
- Number of employees: 995
- Website: www.samash.com

Sam Ash Music was a United States chain of musical instrument stores, headquartered in Hicksville, New York. The chain sold musical instruments, recording equipment, DJ and lighting equipment, and professional sound.

== History ==
=== Early years ===
Musician Sam Ash, born Shmuel Ashkynasye, and his wife Rose, whose families had emigrated from Eastern Europe to New York City when they were children, opened what would become the first Sam Ash Music Store in 1924 as a way to transform Sam's work as a violin teacher and gigging musician in the Sam Ash Orchestra into steady income. Over the next ten years Sam and Rose had three children, Jerome (Jerry), Paul, and Marcia, who all took an active role in the family business.

In 1944 the Ash family moved their business to a new Brooklyn location on 236 Utica Avenue, gradually expanding the store's initial offering beyond sheet music, music instrument repairs, and phonographs, and capitalizing on area school music programs by delivering sheet music and stocking a growing selection of band instruments. In the 1950s as rhythm and blues and rock and roll gained popularity, Sam Ash was among the first stores in the area to add guitar brands like Gibson and Fender, as well as a record shop begun under the supervision of 15-year old Paul, which at one point accounted for nearly half the store's overall revenue.

=== Multi-store growth ===
Sam declined his son's requests to expand the original store to additional locations, but in 1961, five years after his death, Paul and Jerry (then company president and chairman, respectively) expanded into Long Island and Westchester County, opening new stores in Hempstead, Huntington and White Plains. By 1990, there were eight Sam Ash Music stores in the New York area, and in 1992 the first Sam Ash Music store outside the New York area opened in Cherry Hill, New Jersey.

=== West 48th Street's Music Row ===
In 1969, the company established a presence in Midtown Manhattan on West 48th Street's Music Row, a location they gradually expanded. By the late 1980s, after acquiring several struggling competitors, Sam Ash Music's presence dominated the block with an amalgamation of six storefronts with 12 entrances in nine buildings on both sides of the street. In 1999, the company acquired 64-year Music Row mainstay Manny's Music, which they continued to operate under the same name and management. In 2012, facing rising rents and redevelopment, Sam Ash Music relocated the flagship 48th street store to a new location at 333 West 34th Street.

=== Third generation ===
Following Paul's death in 2014, management shifted to a third generation of Ash family, Jerry's sons David, Richard, and Sammy. Sam Ash Music remains family-owned, with a fourth generation of family members already employed by the company. Sammy Ash, who was COO died on 16 September 2023 from cancer.

=== Store closures, bankruptcy and liquidation ===
In March 2024, the company announced the closure of 18 stores nationwide, nearly half of its locations, including the Manhattan flagship store, originally located on the famed 48th Street "music row".

On May 2, 2024, Sam Ash announced that after 100 years, the company would be going out of business and liquidating the remaining 27 stores. The company blamed expensive rent costs at many of its locations that led to major losses. Liquidation sales began at stores and online on May 2, and all 45 stores were expected to conclude liquidation sales and shutter by July 2024. The company was looking for a potential buyer to purchase its IP to keep the chain and online presence open. The company also stated it had no plans to file for bankruptcy. However, after failing to find a buyer, Sam Ash filed for Chapter 11 bankruptcy protection on May 8, 2024, blaming declining sales caused by the COVID-19 pandemic. The company owes around $20 million to Tiger Finance and an additional $20 million to landlords and suppliers, including Yamaha, Gibson, and Fender. Around the same time of the filing, Tiger Finance offered to purchase all of Sam Ash's assets and will raise $20 million to fund the bankruptcy proceedings.

On June 20, 2024, Mexican-based retailer Gonher purchased 'substantially all' of Sam Ash Music's assets at bankruptcy auction. The winning bid was $15.2 million, according to court documents. As of August 2024, the Sam Ash online store (SamAsh.com) has reopened for retail sales.
