= Brad Tolinski =

American journalist

Brad Tolinski is an American journalist who was the editor-in-chief of Guitar World Magazine for 25 years (1989–2015). He also served as editorial director of NewBay Media's music division, which also includes Guitar Aficionado and Revolver magazines. He then moved to Harris Publications as the editorial director of special projects, and then became editorial director of special projects for AMG Parade in New York City. Currently he is a writer and author of several acclaimed books, His most recent release is 'MC5: The Oral Biography of Rock's Most Revolutionary Band,' out October 8, 2024.

== Career ==
Tolinski was born in the suburbs of Detroit, Michigan. He studied journalism and philosophy at Wayne State University (1976–1981). In 1985, Tolinski moved to New York City and started working at We Buy Guitars, a guitar shop on 48th Street. He left after a few months and started working at the Digital Music Center, one of the first recording studios in New York that used Apple computers to sample, sequence and record.

While working at the studio, Tolinski started writing for an independent music magazine called Music, Computers and Software. He interviewed musicians such as Roger Waters, Stewart Copeland and Joe Jackson. In 1986, Tolinski became the managing editor of the magazine. In 1988, he was recruited to work on a short-lived electronic music publication called Modern Keyboard that folded after just a few issues.

In September 1989, Tolinski joined Guitar World as associate editor to help straighten out circulation problems. When the editor-in-chief Joe Bosso left in March 1991 to pursue a record industry A&R job, Tolinski was installed into his position.

“I wanted the magazine to convey to readers that we understood what it means to play guitar and be in a band,” said Tolinski in an interview with Rockcritic.com, “We work together like a band – everyone feels like they play important roles in a creative collective, not like some industrial cog. There’s lots of pressures at times, but it’s also fun – and I believe our readers are intuitively hip to that, because it shows up in our writing design, headlines and photographs.”

Tolinski was also the editorial director of Future US’s music division, which includes Guitar Aficionado and Revolver. He was heavily involved in the launch of Revolver in the spring of 2000, when it was launched as a general interest rock magazine. After that was discontinued by then-owner Harris Publications, Tolinski decided to turn Revolver into a heavy metal magazine.

Tom Beaujour, Greg Di Benedetto, and Tolinski were deeply involved in creating Guitar Aficionado. He says, “[We] noticed that as players matured, their tastes in music and how they viewed the instrument changed. Guitar Aficionado is just a reflection of that. It’s not necessarily ‘high-end.’ You don't have to be a millionaire to be interested in travel, food, fashion or beautiful guitars.”

In 2012 Guitar World, Guitar Aficionado and Revolver magazines were purchased by NewBay Media. This publishing company also holds several other U.S. music titles, including Guitar Player, Bass Player, Electronic Musician, Keyboard Magazine, Mix Magazine, and more. Shortly after this transition, Tolinski was named editorial director of the music group. He continued as editor in chief of Guitar World.

In April 2015 he left Guitar World and took on the position of editorial director of special projects for Harris Publications. Directing a team of editors, he was responsible for producing a wide variety of titles on diverse subjects such as The History of the PC, The 70's, Pink Floyd, The Heart, and many others.

After the closing of Harris Publications in April 2016, Tolinski moved to AMG Parade as the editorial director of special projects, continuing to produce and edit titles including those focusing on The Grateful Dead, Star Trek, and many others on a wide variety of topics. He later became the editor of Cannabliss, a magazine focusing on health, wellness and cannabis published by Centennial Media.

== Music ==
Tolinski is the producer of a compilation CD for Steve Vai's Favored Nations label that focuses on female guitarists, called She Rocks Vol. 1. The project was producing in cooperation with the Women's International Music Network and was released on January 20, 2017 She Rocks Awards in Anaheim, CA.

== Books ==
On October 13, 2012, Tolinski released the book Light & Shade: Conversations with Jimmy Page, published by Crown. Rolling Stone lauded, “An effective, comprehensive account in the guitarist’s own words of his life and music….Keep a copy near the records – and your guitar.” The Boston Globe wrote, “Brad Tolinski’s “Light & Shade: Conversations With Jimmy Page” sheds serious light on this poorly understood, enigmatic musical genius.” The book was published in ten languages. Page, however, told GQ Magazine he was unhappy about the book and with Tolinski personally.

Tolinski co-authored Play It Loud: An Epic History of the Style, Sound and Revolution of the Electric Guitar (Doubleday) with Alan DiPerna. Hailed by NY Times historian Douglas Brinkley and guitarists Carlos Santana and Billy Gibbons, the book released on October 25, 2016, and chronicles the history of this iconic musical instrument. Parade Magazine stated, "Music journalists Brad Tolinski and Alan di Perna are so passionate about the electric guitar they wrote the book on it, delving deep into the instrument’s history, greatest hits and artists." The book's title was used for an exhibit at the Metropolitan Museum of Art in New York City which ran from April 8 - October 1, 2019, titled, "Play It Loud: Instruments of Rock and Roll".

On October 5, 2021 Brad Tolinski and co-author Chris Gill released 'Eruption: Conversations with Eddie Van Halen' (Hachette). The book chronicles the life of this influential guitarist through many in person conversations the pair conducted over the years with Van Halen, plus new interviews and perspectives from other pivotal figures in his life.

The book, 'MC5: An Oral History of Rock's Most Revolutionary Band' which Tolinski co-authored with Jaan Uhelszki, was released on October 8, 2024 on Hachette. The book release was celebrated at the Detroit Institute of Art on October 11 with a lunch event that included a performance by the Detroit Cobras, plus a live interview and book signing with Tolinski and Uhelszki.

Tolinski and co-author Chris Gill will be releasing 'Blow by Blow: The Jeff Beck Story' on July 14, 2026 on Da Capo Press. The book release will be celebrated at The Cutting Room in New York City with an event featuring a live performance by Andy Aledort and guests, in addition to a live interview and book signing.

== BackStory events ==
In 2015 Tolinski formed a new production company with music industry marketer Laura B. Whitmore called BackStory. The pair produces live interview events with iconic musicians that are streamed on partner media platforms, like AOL.com, Parade magazine and Guitar World. Interview subjects have included Ringo Starr, David Lynch, Roger Waters, Tom Jones, Joe Satriani, Zakk Wylde, Warren Haynes, The Zombies, Nile Rodgers, Anthrax, Colbie Caillat, The Violent Femmes, Amy Lee (Evanescence) and others. Tolinski has conducted many of the interviews himself.

In September 2016, Tolinski and Whitmore launched a new live streamed series on Twitch called BackStory Events: Live from Saint Vitus, that features metal and hard rock bands performing at the iconic Brooklyn-based Saint Vitus bar. The series streamed the Revolver Music Awards on December 13, 2016 and produced a live news show for NAMM in Anaheim. They currently have several events in production live streaming from The Cutting Room in NYC, where they host their regular BackStory Events series.

== Media appearances ==
Tolinski appears in the documentary Classic Albums: Deep Purple Machine Head. He hosted a special interview for Guitar Center Sessions with Slash in 2008.

Tolinski was interviewed at the Revolver Golden God Awards in 2011 and was on the panel of judges for Guitar Center’s King of the Blues Contest in 2011. Tolinski wrote program notes for the 2011 Rock and Roll Hall of Fame induction.

He has conducted many live interviews on the AOL Build series including those with Roger Waters, Tom Jones, Joe Satriani, Zakk Wylde, Warren Haynes, The Zombies, Nile Rodgers, Anthrax, and The Violent Femmes.

== Substack ==
In December 2025 Tolinski launched a Substack titled, 'Guitar Land,' focusing on the history of guitar and stories from his career interviewing noted guitarists. His articles include "Why Houses of the Holy Might Be Led Zeppelin’s Masterpiece," "The Greatest Rock Guitar Solos of All Time? Let’s Argue," "Is This the Most Important Unseen Photo in Blues History?" and more.

== Books ==
| Date | Title | Authors |
|---|---|---|
| Oct 1, 1995 | Guitars That Shook the World: A Star Studded Collection of the World's Most Famous Guitars | Brad Tolinski, Harold Steinblatt, Tom Beaujour |
| Sept 30, 2004 | Classic Hendrix: The Ultimate Hendrix Experience | Sally Crick, Brad Tolinski |
| Sept 27, 2011 | The Faces, 1969-75 | Ronnie Wood, Ian McLagan, Kenney Jones, Brad Tolinski |
| October 23, 2012 | Light & Shade: Conversations with Jimmy Page | Brad Tolinski |
| October 25, 2016 | Play It Loud: An Epic History of Style, Sound and Revolution of the Electric Guitar | Brad Tolinski & Alan DiPerna |
| October 5, 2021 | Eruption: Conversations with Eddie Van Halen | Brad Tolinski & Chris Gill |
| October 8, 2024 | MC5: An Oral History of Rock's Most Revolutionary Band | Brad Tolinski & Jaan Uhelszki |
| July 14, 2026 | Blow By Blow: The Jeff Beck Story | Brad Tolinski & Chris Gill |
