= Kelsy Karter =

- Born: Auckland, New Zealand
- Genres: Punk rock; glam rock
- Occupations: Singer; songwriter; guitarist
- Instruments: Vocals; guitar
- Years active: 2015–present
- Labels: BMG, Licorice Pizza Records, United Masters

Kelsy Karter (born 1 August) is a New Zealand singer-songwriter and front-woman of British/Australian rock n' roll band Kelsy Karter & The Heroines. She is best known for her viral publicity stunt in which she supposedly tattooed a picture of Harry Styles on her face to promote her 2019 single "Harry". Time Magazine compared her to the likes of Ozzy Osbourne for this outlandish stunt.

== Early life ==
Kelsy Karter moved to Australia when she was young, and grew up between the Gold Coast and Los Angeles. She was born into a family of jazz musicians and began songwriting at age 16. She now lives between London and Los Angeles with her dog Lennon, named after John Lennon. In her downtime, she enjoys playing poker and cooking.

Karter's background is in musical theatre, Motown and jazz; however, her genre is rock and roll and punk. Her musical inspirations include David Bowie, Amy Winehouse, James Brown, Sam Cooke, Mick Jagger and Freddie Mercury.

== Career ==
Karter rose to international fame in 2019, when she successfully pulled off a publicity stunt tied to the release of her single “Harry,” in which she appeared to have a large portrait tattoo of English singer Harry Styles on her face. The image went viral on social media and was widely covered by international news outlets, though Karter later acknowledged the tattoo was temporary and part of the promotional strategy for the song. Time likened the stunt to theatrical rock-and-roll showmanship reminiscent of artists such as Ozzy Osbourne, while some commentators called it controversial, Karter has stated she's "always been cheeky like that". She has had her music in several TV and films including - "Blast Off" featured on season 4, episode 11 of the comedy drama television series The Bold Type. Karter contributed as a singer, songwriter, and composer across four seasons of Syfy’s television series 12 Monkeys, a collaboration that began after her song “Children of My Hometown” was featured on the show.

In 2020, Karter signed a global recording agreement with BMG. On 2 October 2020, her debut album Missing Person was released. Produced by Zakk Cervini and Chris Greatti, Karter wrote the album after the death of a loved one and a breakup, stating "I was so depressed and broke, and probably at the lowest point in my whole life. For a while I sort of lost myself, which is why the album's called Missing Person..." Her single "God Knows I've Tried" from the album was featured in Rolling Stone as a 'Song You Need to Know'. The Foo Fighters have cited this song as one that inspired their 2021 album Medicine At Midnight.

In 2023, Karter co-wrote the songs “Let It Ride” and “God in a Dress” for English singer Paloma Faith. Karter continued to expand her presence within the rock genre with her band, Kelsy Karter & the Heroines, receiving the 2024 She Rocks Spirit Award, which recognizes influential women in rock music. That same year, she signed a new deal with United Masters and released the rock opera album Love Made Me Do It through Licorice Pizza Records with Kelsy Karter & the Heroines. In 2025, Karter and her band embarked on a world tour in support of the album and served as an opening act for American rock band Halestorm playing the legendary O2 Arena

Karter has directed many of her band's music videos and has toured the US, Europe and the UK several times fronting her band "Kelsy Karter & The Heroines", consisting of British musicians Sebastian Boyse on drums, Matthew Peach on Guitar and Tommy Gent on bass.

Karter sings about her anxieties, relationships, identity, and rebellion against conformity. Her music is imbued with themes of staying true to yourself and embracing your individuality and uniqueness. She describes her relationship with her fans as a "partnership". She says, "I want them to feel strong in their individuality, and to stop caring about what other people think. I hope it helps them to feel both totally vulnerable and completely invincible at the very same time."

In 2019 she opened for The Struts, and has since toured with The Glorious Sons and The Hunna. In 2023 she opened for Billy Idol.

== Discography ==
=== Studio albums ===
Title	Album details
Missing Person	Released: 2 October 2020; Label: Bertelsmann Music Group; Formats: Digital download, streaming
Love Made Me Do It	Released: 2025; Artist: Kelsy Karter & the Heroines; Label: Licorice Pizza Records; Formats: Digital download, streaming

=== EPs ===
Title	EP Details
Love Me Or Hate Me	Released: 4 September 2020; Label: Bertelsmann Music Group; Format: CD, digital download, streaming
Live From Nowhere	Released: 7 May 2021; Label: Bertelsmann Music Group; Format: CD, digital download, streaming

=== Singles ===
List of singles, with year released
Title	Year
"Out of Drugs"	2017
"God Knows I've Tried"	2018
"Catch Me If You Can"	2018
"Harry"	2019
"What U"	2019
"Liquor Store On Mars"	2019
"Blast Off"	2019
"Devil On My Shoulder"	2020
"Stick To Your Guns"	2020
"Love Me or Hate Me"	2020
"Rest In Pieces" (with Goody Grace)	2022
"Cover You"	2022
"Alone (Stripped)"	2022
"Ugly" (Letdown featuring Kelsy Karter & The Heroines)	2022
"Crying (Stripped)"	2023
"Wild"	2023
"Love Goes On"	2024
"Laser to the Heart"	2024
"Call Me"	2026
