= Dave Rat =

Sound system designer, sound consultant and live sound engineer

David "Rat" Levine (born June 11, 1962) is the founder of Rat Sound and Sound Tools, a sound system designer, sound consultant and live sound engineer for many well-known artists such as Black Flag, the Red Hot Chili Peppers, Pearl Jam, Rage Against the Machine and Blink-182. Rat ran sound for the first Warped Tour in 1995, and has served annually as sound system provider at Coachella since its founding in 1999.

== Early life ==
David Levine was born on June 11, 1962, in Alabama. He was raised in Hermosa Beach, California, and attended Mira Costa High School in Manhattan Beach. Introduced to The Church by his friend Michele Fiat in 1978, Rat started volunteering at the Hermosa Beach crash pad; this was a former Baptist church turned into a punk rock rehearsal space for the Descendents, Redd Kross, Black Flag and the Last. Rat helped with band equipment and sound gear, and picked up the nickname Rat Boy. Black Flag frontman Henry Rollins called him Rat Man. Rat founded the sound company Recording Art Technical Sound (R.A.T. Sound, also known as Rat Sound), but soon found that recording sessions were boring and repetitive. He focused on live sound mixing, and rebranded as Reliable Audio Technology. For a brief period he was employed as an environmental test technician at Hughes Aircraft.

== Black Flag ==
Rat became known in the Greater Los Angeles punk scene as a sound engineer specializing in punk shows. He designed robust solutions for the chaotic stage behavior of punk musicians, with Rat bolting microphones to the stands, and mounting heavy duty steel mesh on the monitor wedge loudspeakers. Black Flag hired Rat in 1985 to provide sound for the band's US tour, which extended into three tours. In 1986, Rat designed proprietary subwoofers for the tour; later models based on this design continue as active inventory four decades later. Rat first met Karrie Keyes on a Black Flag tour date; Rat hired and trained Keyes to be a sound engineer.

== Red Hot Chili Peppers ==
In 1991, Rat began a 27-year stretch as the concert sound engineer for the Red Hot Chili Peppers. His first tour for the band was in support of the Blood Sugar Sex Magik album. Between Pepper's dates, Rat provided sound for Pearl Jam, starting in the early 1990s. He designed a concert loudspeaker called the Rat Trap 5, a compact 4-way trapezoidal enclosure the sturdiness of which impressed then-punk rock promoter Gary Tovar of Goldenvoice Productions. Eventually, this connection led to Rat doing sound for Goldenvoice at Coachella.

From 2006 to 2010, Rat published a blog titled "Roadies in the Midst", chronicling his experiences as front of house sound engineer for the Red Hot Chili Peppers on their Stadium Arcadium tour. He continued the blog for the Blink-182 Reunion Tour in 2009.

In December 2005 Rat innovated a unique sound system design based on a dual side-by-side speaker system that he called the Double Hung PA. The outer speaker array reproduces guitar, bass, toms and cymbals and the inner speaker array reproduces vocals, kick and snare. Since no single instrument or vocal was sent to both systems, comb filtering issues were avoided while system clarity was increased because each loudspeaker array was reproducing a less complex signal, reducing intermodulation distortion. The Red Hot Chili Peppers toured with the Double Hung System for the duration of their Stadium Arcadium tour. At the band's request, Rat rigged the double-hung system at Coachella in 2007. In July 2008, the Brazil-based sound company Gabisom implemented the side-by-side PA concept for the Rock in Rio festival in Portugal and in 2009 Pennsylvania based sound company, Clair Brothers, provided touring artists U2 with an in-the-round stadium-sized sound system, based on the same double-hung PA concept.

In 2009 Rat began working on several steerable sub woofer array concepts which he implemented on the Blink-182 reunion tour. The Vortex, Slotfire and V-Fire configurations describe methods of arranging and delaying conventional sub woofers such that low frequency sound bleed onto stage is reduced and horizontal subwoofer coverage to the audience is steerable. For this tour, Rat used the French L-Acoustics K1 series line array speakers rather than the original V-DOSC system.

Rat worked with Soundgarden in mid-2011 on the band's North American tour. Subsequently, Rat again worked with the Red Hot Chili Peppers on their 2011–2013 I'm with You World Tour, followed by the Red Hot Chili Peppers 2013–2014 Tour. He again worked with them on their 2016–17 The Getaway World Tour. On January 12, 2017, Rat announced his final RHCP tour date would be January 21, 2017, in Minnesota. Rat said "I truly love Flea, Anthony, Chad, Josh and all my dear and close friends I consider family both on the road now and those that have moved on to other adventures over the years. I am pretty happy to say that I have dedicated significant time documenting touring with the Peppers in journals but also have thousands of amazing photos spanning decades of smiles and challenges."

== Festivals ==
In 1995, Rat supplied sound equipment and engineers for the first Warped Tour, and has repeated this work in various other years including 2005 and 2018. Rat was given this assignment after doing smaller gigs for producer Kevin Lyman. In 2008, Rat consulted on a solar powered sound system for one of the Warped stages.

Rat met producers Paul Tollett and Rick Van Santen in 1993, and they said they were planning to start a California desert festival called Coachella. Through Tovar and Goldenvoice, Rat was hired to provide sound for three of the five stages at the first Coachella gathering in 1999. In 2007, Rat expanded to supply all five stages.

Rat supported the benefit concert called Rock for Choice in 2004, and provided sound for the LA Weekly Detour Music Festival in 2008.

== Pro sound industry ==
Rat writes articles for various professional sound magazines and has been asked to speak at sound conventions and events such as those held by the Audio Engineering Society and Full Sail University. He has designed speakers and sound equipment such as the MicroWedge, which is manufactured by Eastern Acoustic Works and is now a familiar monitor wedge on many worldwide tours. Rat wrote a column for Live Sound International magazine entitled, "Rat Tales" in the November 2006 issue and another in the May 2007 issue.

Rat is the holder of two patents, the MicroWedge stage monitor design and the Sound Tools Sniffer/Sender Unit.

In 2025, Dave Rat was honored with the Audio Innovator Award at the 23rd Annual Parnelli Awards ceremony in Anaheim, CA.

== Personal life ==
With sound engineer Karrie Keyes, Rat is the co-parent of twin daughters born in 1996. Maddie Keyes-Levine is a freelance photographer who graduated from California Institute of the Arts in 2023, and Sammy Keyes-Levine graduated from UC Berkeley and is an audio engineer and speech-language therapist.
