= Manny's Music =

American musical instrument retailer

Manny's Music was an American music instrument store in New York City on Music Row (West 48th Street, between 6th and 7th Avenues), Midtown Manhattan, where musicians from beginner to professional could buy their instruments and meet each other. Many artists bought their first guitar from Manny's before they became famous. The store was in business for 74 years, from 1935 to 2009. Manny's relaunched in 2024 after the brand was acquired by Vista Musical Instruments.

== History ==
Manny Goldrich (15 April 1904 – 25 May 1968), originally a saxophone salesman, founded Manny's Musical Instruments & Accessories Inc. in 1935 on West 48th Street. From its start until 1959, Manny's was located at 120 West 48th Street. "Music Row" was so named because of the many music shops clustered there. At first, the store was about 20 feet by 20 feet, but expanded gradually to the whole building by about 1954. The store hit its heyday in the 1960s, after British invasion bands started to visit America. Prices were low and product ranges wider than in Europe. In 1965, Rockefeller Center offered to buy the property, and purchased a new building for Manny's at 156 West 48th Street. The shop moved officially to its new location in 1969, but Goldrich never got to see it. Before his death in 1968, he passed the store on to his son, Henry Goldrich (15 May 1932 – 16 February 2021), and daughter, Helen Burgauer. Manny's eventually passed, in the early 1990s, to Manny Goldrich's grandsons, Ian and Judd Goldrich. In 1999, they sold Manny's to its chainstore rival across the street, Sam Ash Music, who, in turn, maintained Manny's as a subsidiary and retained its staff and family managers until 2009. Manny's relaunched in 2024 after the brand was acquired from Sam Ash by Vista Musical Instruments.

== The Wall of Fame ==
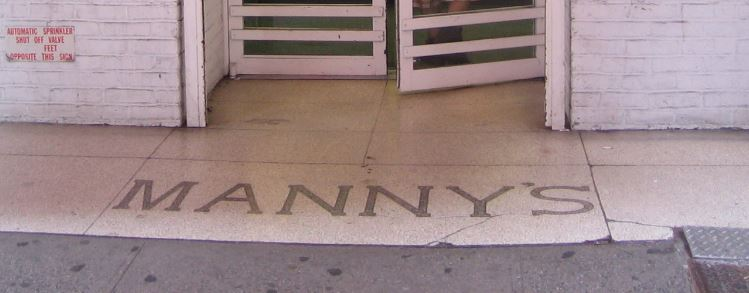
Text on 48th Street in front of the shop's former location

The walls of Manny's had thousands of autographed publicity photos of musicians. When Manny's closed in 2009, those photos became the focus of negotiations between Manny's owner, Sam Ash Music, and Manny's founding family. Holly Goldrich, Manny Goldrich's granddaughter, and Sandi Bachom built a Web site, The Virtual Wall of Fame, where more than 3,000 photos are shown. The artists in the pictures include:

- Johnny Ramone
- Don McLean
- Johnny Cash
- Jimi Hendrix
- Buddy Holly
- The Beatles
- The Doors
- Bob Dylan
- The Who
- David Gilmour

== The Yellow Guitar ==
Henry Goldrich used to tell customers, "You try it, you buy it", as he did not want the shop's guitars to be scratched. This led to his purchase of "The Yellow Guitar", a Danelectro that had been used for a photo shoot and was painted yellow. Goldrich required customers who wanted to try different guitar effects to use this guitar. George Harrison tried to buy it, but Goldrich did not sell the guitar.

== Honors ==
- In 1988, Manny Goldrich was posthumously inducted into the NAMM Hall of Fame

== In popular culture ==
=== Music videos ===
- Manny's was featured in Guns N' Roses' "Paradise City" video.
