= Full Compass Systems =

American musical instrument retailer

Full Compass Systems, Ltd.
- Type: Private
- Industry: Pro Audio, Video, Lighting, and Musical Instruments
- Founded: 1977; 49 years ago
- Headquarters: Madison, WI
- Key people: Jonathan Lipp, co-founder; Susan Lipp, co-founder, Chairman; Dave Chaimson, President
- Products: Pro Audio, Video, TV, Photo, Musical Instruments, Lighting and Theatrical, Computers and Software
- Number of employees: 180
- Website: www.fullcompass.com

Full Compass Systems is an American retailer of professional audio, professional video, lighting equipment and musical instruments. The company offers more than 100,000 products through 800 manufacturer brands, and it is an authorized service center and parts distributor for many. Full Compass also provides other services, such as computer systems integration and equipment rentals (rentals available in WI only). The company, founded in 1977 by Jonathan and Susan Lipp, is located in Madison, Wisconsin.

== Overview ==
Full Compass is one of the largest woman-owned businesses in Wisconsin. It has a 140,000 sq. ft. corporate headquarters, which serves as a retail store and distribution center for all shipped merchandise, and an 80,000 sq. ft. warehouse. The facility also has two working production studios, a public technology museum, and the "Backstage Bistro," with a full-time kitchen staff that caters to employees and visitors.

The company has approximately 200 employees, and about one-third are highly trained sales professionals.

== History ==
=== Early years ===
Full Compass Systems was founded as a professional sound studio in Madison, Wisconsin, in 1971 by Johnathan and Susan Lipp. Jonathan incorporated Full Compass Systems, Ltd. In 1977 to provide professional sound equipment to a wider market. In 1978, Susan, who had previous marketing, personnel management, and theatrical production experience, joined the company full-time and became president.

=== 1980 to 2000 ===
The company opened its first retail store in Madison, Wisconsin, in 1979 with a staff of four, offering lighting and audio equipment. By the end of the 1980s, the company expanded its product line to video and theatrical equipment, distributing over 350 manufacturers. During the 1990s, Full Compass offered its first color catalog. In 1995, to accommodate its enormous growth, the company expanded into a 72,000 sq. ft. building with a 42,000 sq. ft. warehouse in Middleton, Wisconsin. In 1998, the company formed its Computer Integration department and opened its Compass Xpress division to serve customers in off-hours.

=== 2000 to Present ===
To address the retail industry's shift to eCommerce, Full Compass began selling products on eBay.com in 2003 and Amazon.com in 2004. The company launched its own eCommerce site in 2006. By 2008, the company's Middleton facility was too small for its required inventory. Full Compass designed and built its current 140,000 sq. ft. headquarters, taking occupancy on July 1, 2009.

Full Compass has a full-time staff of approximately 200. The company releases semi-annual catalogs in Spring/Summer and Fall/Winter.
