= Richard Grune =

German artist and concentration camp survivor (1903–1983)

- Born: 2 August 1903; Flensburg, German Empire
- Died: 26 November 1983 (aged 80); Hamburg, Germany

Richard Grune (2 August 1903 – 26 November 1983) was a German visual artist, anti-fascist, and Nazi concentration camp survivor.

Richard Grune was born on 2 August 1903 in Flensburg, Germany. Grune studied for five terms at the Kiel School of Applied Arts, later spending a year at the Bauhaus in Weimar and Dessau. At the Bauhaus, Grune studied under Wassily Kandinsky and Paul Klee.

In 1933, Grune moved to Berlin to work as a graphic designer. Following the Nazi rise to power later that year, Grune began contributing to anti-fascist publications that opposed the new government.

In December 1934, Grune was arrested as part of the Nazi Party's push to enforce Paragraph 175 which criminalized homosexual activity. In September 1936, he was convicted under the provision and sentenced to prison in Lichtenburg. Following his release, Grune was sent to the Sachsenhausen and later Flossenbürg concentration camps.

In 1945, Grune escaped from Flossenbürg and returned to Kiel. Over the following years, his artistic practice focused on a series of lithographs titled "The Passion of Twentieth Century" that documented life and conditions in the concentration camps.

Richard Grune died on 26 November 1983 in Hamburg, Germany. He is buried in Kiel, Schleswig-Holstein, Germany.
