= Museum of Making Music =

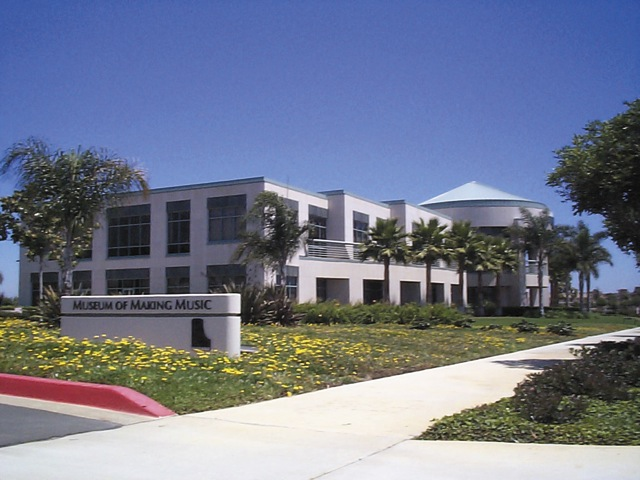
- Established: 2000
- Location: 5790 Armada Drive; Carlsbad, California
- Coordinates: 33.127646°N 117.317136°W
- Type: Music museum
- Website: Official Website

The Museum of Making Music, or MoMM, is a museum dedicated to music products. A signature program of the National Association of Music Merchants' NAMM Foundation, the museum is located at NAMM's headquarters in Carlsbad, California.

== History ==
In 1998, while planning its centennial anniversary in 2001, NAMM decided to open a museum dedicated to music products. The museum opened to the public on March 5, 2000. Its mission is to "explore the accomplishments and impact of the music products industry through educational and interactive exhibitions and programs and directly connect visitors with hands-on music making."

During its first 20 years of existence, the museum curated public exhibits about the history of American popular music, the manufacture and retailing of musical instruments and the history of the music products industry from the 1890s to the present day. A $1 million renovation was completed in June 2021.

According to the museum's Executive Director Carolyn Grant, the museum's exhibits cover "what goes into making instruments, why instruments change over time, why instruments go in and out of popularity, the impact of technology on making instruments, and the impact of cultural shifts on making music instruments."

The museum's galleries feature more than 450 vintage instruments and artifacts, hundreds of audio samples of popular music and a visitors interactive area with live, hands-on instruments, along with Sit 'N Play areas near the end of the main galleries. In addition to its permanent collection, the museum self-curates temporary exhibitions that revolve around a core theme or idea. These exhibitions are on public display at the museum for 6 to 8 months.

The museum organizes public events, performances and lectures to entertain, educate and inform audiences about the heritage and benefits of making music. Its initiatives include the Title 1 field trip program, which annually provides free entry to the museum for thousands of schoolchildren from economically challenged areas.

== See also ==
- List of music museums
