= Rat Sound =

Rat Sound Systems is a sound equipment provider of touring sound reinforcement equipment and services to the concert touring industry, based in Camarillo, California.

Rat Sound Systems was established in 1980 by Dave Rat and Brian Benjamin, and is known for being one of the first sound companies to tour with hard core punk bands such as Black Flag, Fear and the Dead Kennedys.

The list of artists and events that Rat Sound Systems has provided equipment for includes: Black Flag, Sonic Youth, Pearl Jam, Red Hot Chili Peppers, Jack Johnson, R.E.M., AFI, Ben Harper, Blink 182, The Offspring, Rage Against the Machine, Weezer, Queens of the Stone Age, Eddie Vedder, My Chemical Romance, Paramore, Jimmy Eat World, Beck, The Used and many other artists.

The Coachella Valley Music and Arts Festival has utilized Rat Sound to provide audio as the primary audio vendor since 2001. Warped Tour and Taste of Chaos both tour with sound systems provided by Rat Sound.
