= George Gruhn =

American writer, businessman and ophiophilist

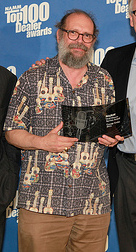
- Gruhn at the 2011 NAMM Oral History Service Award ceremony
- Born: August 21, 1945 (age 79); New York
- Occupation(s): Writer, businessman

George Gruhn (born August 21, 1945) is an American writer, businessman and ophiophilist. He is considered one of the foremost experts on vintage American guitars and fretted instruments, and the author of several books on the subject. He is the founder of Gruhn Guitars in Nashville, and has sold guitars to musicians such as Hank Williams, Jr., Eric Clapton, Brad Paisley, Lyle Lovett, Emmylou Harris, Billy Gibbons, Rick Nielsen, Vince Gill, and John Hiatt.

== Early life and education ==
Gruhn was born in New York on August 21, 1945. He developed an early interest in zoology and began collecting reptiles. His family relocated to Pittsburgh and later Chicago, where Gruhn attended Oak Park and River Forest High School. While studying ethology at the University of Chicago, Gruhn drove his younger brother around to help him shop for a better guitar. Gruhn noticed that older and used acoustic guitars sounded better than new ones, and had the idea that vintage instruments could potentially be categorized much like zoological taxonomy. Gruhn developed a fascination for vintage guitars and found so many good deals that he began buying and selling the instruments for a profit.

Later, while pursuing graduate studies at the University of Tennessee in Knoxville, Gruhn received a phone call from Hank Williams, Jr., who had heard from Sonny Osborne that Gruhn had a lot of Martin guitars. Williams drove from Nashville to Knoxville in a Jaguar E-Type and bought three guitars, because that was all that would fit in the 2-seat sports car. He returned the following day in a Cadillac Eldorado, and bought enough guitars to fill the car. Williams eventually encouraged Gruhn to open a vintage guitar store in Nashville.

== Career ==
Gruhn opened Gruhn Guitars on January 2, 1970 with an inventory of 22 instruments in a 20 x 40 foot space at 111 4th Avenue North, in what was then a rundown section of downtown Nashville's Lower Broadway district, next to the stage door of the Ryman Auditorium, the home of the Grand Ole Opry. Gruhn's store played a key role in establishing the vintage guitar market while also becoming one of the world's leading vintage musical instrument retailers and attracting the business of notable musicians, including Eric Clapton, Brad Paisley, Lyle Lovett, Emmylou Harris, Billy Gibbons, Rick Nielsen, Vince Gill, and John Hiatt.

Gruhn has been a featured columnist for Vintage Guitar, Guitar Player, Bluegrass Unlimited, and The Music Trades magazines.

Gruhn utilized his idea for applying zoological taxonomy observation techniques to vintage fretted instruments, modeling identification keys after zoological equivalents and collaborating with co-author Walter Carter to publish Gruhn's Guide To Vintage Guitars: An Identification Guide for American Fretted Instruments in 1991. He collaborated with Carter again to release two books, Electric Guitars and Basses: A Photographic History and Acoustic Guitars and other Fretted Instruments: A Photographic History in 1999.

Gruhn is married and has a daughter named Amanda Lynn.

== Selected publications ==
- Gruhn's Guide To Vintage Guitars: An Identification Guide for American Fretted Instruments. New York: Backbeat Books. (with Walter Carter)
  - 1st ed. (1991), 2nd ed. (1999), 3rd ed. (2010)
- (1997) Electric Guitars and Basses: A Photographic History. San Francisco: GPI Books. (with Walter Carter)
- (1997) Acoustic Guitars and other Fretted Instruments: A Photographic History. San Francisco: GPI Books. (with Walter Carter)

== See also ==
- Gruhn Guitars
- Vintage Guitar
