= Sam Ash =

Violinist, teacher, and entrepreneur (1897–1956)

- Born: Shmuel Ashkynasye; August 21, 1897; Austria-Hungary
- Died: September 8, 1956 (aged 59)
- Occupations: Musician, music teacher, Entrepreneur
- Spouse: Rose Dinin (m. 1924)
- Relatives: Jerry Ash (son); Paul Ash (son); Marcia Ash (daughter)

Sam Ash (born Shmuel Ashkynasye; August 21, 1897 – September 8, 1956) was a violinist, teacher, and entrepreneur, best known as the founder of the Sam Ash Music Store.

== Life and career ==
=== Early life ===
Ashkynase was born to Moishe and Mottle Ashkynase in a small town that was at the time Austria-Hungary, then called Yanov, on August 21, 1897. In 1907 his family immigrated to the United States, settling on Hopkinson Avenue in Brooklyn. He was a Yiddish speaker.

When Ash's father Morris became unemployed after contending with a tumor, he entered the workforce to help with his family's finances, working as an apprentice as a cutter in the garment industry. At the same time Ash was discovering that his true passion was playing the violin. Ash began teaching music lessons and later formed the Sam Ash Orchestra, performing at weddings, dances, and Jewish organizations around the New York City area.

=== Marriage and Sam Ash Music Store ===
In August 1923 Sam met Russian immigrant Rose Dinin and 6 months later, on February 9, 1924, they married. Rose felt that the income from Sam's music career wasn't reliable, so they decided to start their own business. They pawned Rose's engagement ring for $400 (she later got it back) in order to make the final downpayment to rent the building that would become the first Sam Ash Music Store.

In 1925, their first son Jerry was born, followed in 1929 by their second son Paul, and finally their daughter Marcia in 1935, with the family living in a small 3-bedroom apartment behind the music store as they struggled to grow the business in the midst of the Great Depression. As the economy began to recover their neighborhood was declining, so in 1944 they moved to another part of Brooklyn, buying a building on 236 Utica Avenue.

Ash had already expanded his store's offerings beyond the initial assortment of sheet music, music instrument repairs, and phonographs. He began capitalizing on area school music programs by delivering sheet music and stocking a growing selection of band instruments. In the 1950s as rhythm and blues and rock and roll gained popularity, Ash was among the first stores in the area to add guitar brands like Gibson and Fender. He also tasked son Paul with adding a record store, which at one point accounted for nearly half the store's overall revenue.

=== Death ===
On September 8, 1956, Sam died of a massive heart attack.

== Recognition ==
Sam Ash was inducted into the Long Island Music Hall of Fame on October 15, 2006.
