= Gruhn Guitars =

American musical instrument retailer

Gruhn Guitars is a musical instrument store located in Nashville. Founded in 1970 by George Gruhn, an expert on vintage American guitars and related instruments, Gruhn Guitars is known as a mecca for professional musicians and well-heeled collectors of vintage musical instruments.

== History ==
George Gruhn began collecting and selling vintage American guitars while attending college, eventually establishing himself in the folk festival circuit. Gruhn attracted the attention of country music legend Hank Williams Jr., who became a customer and eventually encouraged Gruhn to open a vintage guitar store in Nashville.

On January 2, 1970, Gruhn opened the business with an inventory of 22 instruments in a 20 x 40 foot space at 111 4th Avenue North, in what was then a rundown section of downtown Nashville's Lower Broadway district, next to the stage door of the Ryman Auditorium, the home of the Grand Ole Opry. The store was originally named GTR, which stood for George Gruhn, business partner Tut Taylor and employee Randy Wood.

The store became known as a mecca for professional musicians and well-heeled collectors of vintage musical instruments, including such notable artists as Duane Allman, Mark Knopfler, Robert Plant, Sturgill Simpson, Joe Bonamassa, Eric Clapton, Billy Gibbons, and Rick Nielsen. Vintage pre-owned instruments comprise a large portion of the store's inventory, which also includes new instruments from both mainstream manufacturers and independent luthiers.

The store garnered national attention after Visa featured it in 1992 in a TV commercial.

On December 31, 2006, Garrison Keillor visited Gruhn Guitars with Vince Gill for his New Year's Show at Ryman Auditorium for PBS' Great Performances. Gill told a story about buying some of his guitars at Gruhn's.

In 2013, the shop relocated to a larger space at 2120 8th Avenue South.
