= SoundGirls =

SoundGirls is a professional advocacy organization aiming to empower women working in the audio industry. It was co-founded in 2013 by Pearl Jam’s monitor engineer Karrie Keyes, and Michelle Sabolchick Pettinato, Front of house mixer for Styx, Mr. Big and Elvis Costello. The organization's mission is "empowering the next generation of women in audio" and increasing the number of women in the workforce, which is currently under 5% in some disciplines of the industry (like music production).

Keyes and Sabolchick met when they were on a panel together at the 2012 AES Convention in San Francisco. The panel was hosted by the Women's Audio Mission called "Women of Professional Concert Sound" and was moderated by Terri Winston, the founder of Women's Audio Mission.

Since then, SoundGirls has grown to over 6,000 members and has several chapters worldwide. The organization assists with mentorships, job placement, workshops, and scholarships. The organization is inclusive of all genders and non-conforming genders. Keyes is currently the executive director and runs the organization on a daily basis.

== History ==
In 2015, SoundGirls started holding live sound camps in the summer for girls. These events have been held in California, New York, Philadelphia, and St Louis.

The soundgirls website features profiles of women working in different sectors of the music and audio industry.

In 2018, SoundGirls teamed up with Spotify to create the EQL Directory, an international database for women working in audio and music production. They have also partnered with the SoundGym audio training organisation, to offer subscriptions to women training in audio.

In 2020, the COVID-19 pandemic left thousands of SoundGirls members unemployed when live events were canceled, with the potential for being out of work for years. In response, they created the SoundGirls Coronavirus Relief Fund to aid production techs worldwide who were out of work.

SoundGirls also started a podcast in 2020, hosted by Beckie Campbell and Susan Williams. Interviews have included award-winning recording engineer Leslie Ann-Jones, Tana Douglas (the touring industry's first female roadie), NASA's live broadcast engineer Alexandria Perryman, Ann Mincieli, Mary Mazurek, and Jeri Palumbo. SoundGirls also created the SoundGirls Living History project, an oral history project with audio industry veterans to discuss their careers.
