= National Association of Music Merchants =

U.S. nonprofit organization

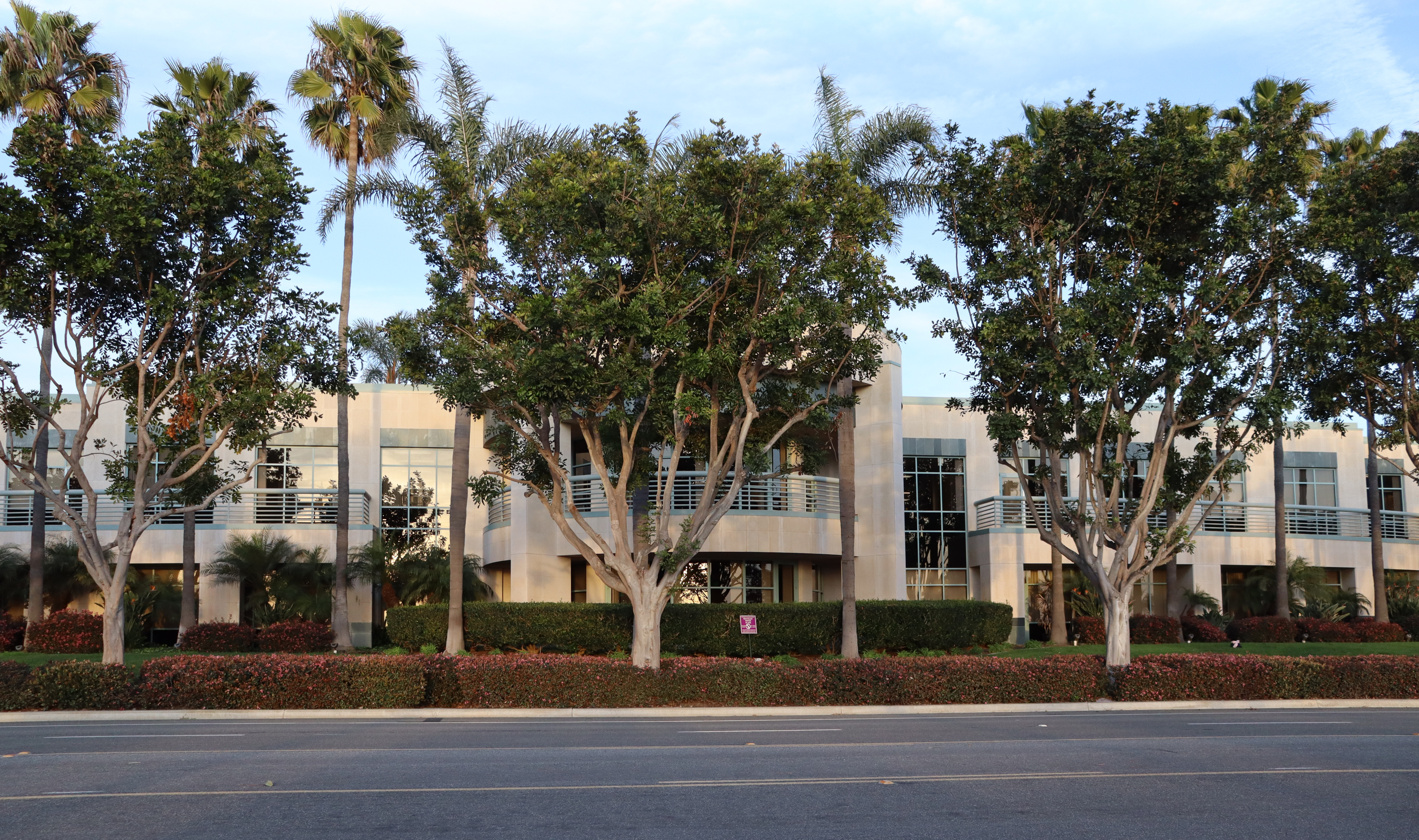
- Abbreviation: NAMM
- Formation: 1901; 125 years ago
- Founded at: New York City, United States
- Type: Nonprofit
- Legal status: company
- Purpose: trade association
- Headquarters: 5790 Armada Drive
- Location: Carlsbad, United States
- Coordinates: 33.127646°N 117.317136°W
- Members: 15000 (2023)
- President & CEO: John Mlynczak
- Website: www.namm.org
- Formerly called: National Association of Piano Dealers of America

The National Association of Music Merchants (NAMM) is a not-for-profit global trade association dedicated to the music products industry. Originally founded in 1901, NAMM is headquartered in Carlsbad, California, and represents 15,000 global member companies and individual professionals.

== History ==
In 1901, 52 members of the National Piano Manufacturers Association of America formed the National Association of Piano Dealers of America (NAPDA) to unite and promote legitimate piano makers and sellers in New York City at a time when many unscrupulous dealers were selling cheap knock-offs as better and more expensive brands. The organization lobbied heavily in Washington, D.C. to establish fair practices in musical instrument marketing. The organization's first annual trade show and convention was held in Baltimore, Maryland the following year with membership dues at $5.00 per store. In 1912, the NAPDA became the National Association of Piano Merchants of America (NAPMA).

By 1919, after the popularity of early jazz and the marching band music of John Philip Sousa had convinced many piano merchants to produce full lines of band instruments. The NAPMA renamed itself National Association of Music Merchants, or NAMM. NAMM's main focus became music education and fair trade, with NAMM pledging $250,000 in 1920 toward the establishment of a national conservatory of music in the US.

NAMM membership grew from 154 members in 1936 to 554 members in 1941, and in 1946, NAMM headquarters moved to 28 East Jackson Blvd in Chicago.

In 1967, NAMM membership had grown to 1,000. In 1984, NAMM relocated its headquarters from Chicago to Carlsbad, California.

In 1996, NAMM established the NAMM Resource Center to preserve the history of the music products industry, and in 2000 founded the NAMM Oral History Program, an oral history project and archive of recordings of interviews with people from all aspects of the music industry, including music instrument retailers, musical instrument and product creators, suppliers and sales representatives, music educators and advocates, publishers, live sound and recording pioneers, innovators, founders, and musicians.

In 2006, NAMM was granted membership admission to the International Music Council (IMC).

By 2015, NAMM membership had reached 10,000 members.

== Trade shows ==
The NAMM Show is a major music products industry trade show held annually in Anaheim, California. The NAMM-sponsored show typically hosts product exhibits and educational seminars. First held in 1902 as the NAPDA Convention, the NAMM Show is the largest and longest-running music product trade show in the world, with over 2,000 exhibitors and 115,888 attendees in 2020. A smaller convention, NAMM Summer Session, typically takes place in June or July in Nashville.

From 2012 until 2018, NAMM also held NAMM Musikmesse Russia in Moscow, which took place concurrently with Prolight + Sound Russia.

== Charitable activities ==
The NAMM Foundation is a 501(c)(3) nonprofit organization that advances active participation in music-making by supporting scientific research, philanthropic giving and public service programs. Incorporated in 2006, the NAMM Foundation is a supporting organization of NAMM, and is funded by NAMM members through trade association activities and private donations. The foundation has a grant program that donates to related programs, advocacy, and research worldwide. Together with the NAMM market development department, between 1994 and 2022 the foundation has reinvested over $200 million in support of music education and to promote music making.

In 1997 NAMM established the International Foundation for Music Research (IFMR), which later became the NAMM Foundation Research Division.

In 1998, the NAMM Foundation established the Museum of Making Music, a museum dedicated to the accomplishments and impact of the people who make, sell, and use musical instruments and products, and the museum was opened to the public in March 2000.

Also beginning in 1998, the Foundation began an annual recognition of schools and their districts with its Best Communities for Music Education award.

== Other activities ==
NAMM supports lobbying efforts in support of the music products industry, as they did in 1964, when William R. Gard, Executive Vice President of NAMM, spoke at a U.S. Congress Ways and Means Committee hearings in support of repealing the 10% Federal Excise Tax on musical instruments that was part of the Revenue Act of 1941.

In 1966, the first film underwritten by NAMM for the American Music Conference (AMC), Bringing Music into the Classroom was released.

In 1993, NAMM funded the research by physicist Gordon Shaw and psychologist and cellist Frances Rauscher at the University of California Irvine into what’s been called the Mozart effect — which suggested classical music could have a short-term benefit on cognitive performance. The NAMM Foundation continues to support the Institute for Music and Neurologic Function, which was founded by the late neurologist Oliver Sacks to research the link between music and neurological conditions including strokes, trauma, dementia, Alzheimer’s and Parkinson’s diseases.

Beginning annually in 2005, NAMM has coordinated the Music Education Advocacy D.C. Fly-In, which brings a coalition of NAMM members together in Washington D.C. to meet with members of the U.S. Congress in support of funding music education in public schools as outlined in the Every Student Succeeds Act.

NAMM has also organized coalitions to advocate for the music products industry in relation to the Convention on International Trade in Endangered Species of Wild Fauna and Flora, or CITES.

== Partnerships ==
In 2018, NAMM announced partnerships with the Audio Engineering Society (AES) and with the Entertainment Services and Technology Association (ESTA), and in 2020, NAMM joined the World Entertainment Technology Federation (World-ETF).

== Awards ==
NAMM has established a number of awards to recognize individuals, institutions, and organizations for contributions to music, with its highest honor, the NAMM Music for Life Award, recognizing individuals and organizations that demonstrate support for promoting music education and creating more active music-makers. The NAMM Music for Life Award has been granted to such varied recipients as singer-songwriter Nanci Griffith, former politician and music education advocate Mike Huckabee, former National Endowment for the Arts chairman Bill Ivey, songwriter Kara DioGuardi, Kenny Loggins, Mark Ronson, and Brian Wilson, among others.

== See also ==
- NAMM Show
- NAMM Oral History Program
- Museum of Making Music
