= NAMM Show =

Music merchandisers' trade show

The NAMM Show
- Status: Active
- Genre: Music industry
- Venue: Anaheim Convention Center
- Location: Anaheim, California
- Country: United States
- Inaugurated: January 1902; 124 years ago
- Most recent: January 20, 2026; 9 months ago
- Next event: January 26, 2027; 2 months' time
- Attendance: ▲63,000+ (2025)
- Organizer: NAMM (National Association of Music Merchants)
- Filing status: 501(c)(6)
- Website: www.namm.org

The NAMM Show is an annual trade show in the United States organized by the National Association of Music Merchants (NAMM), which describes it as "the industry's largest stage, uniting the global music, sound and entertainment technology communities". It is typically held in January at the Anaheim Convention Center in Anaheim, California.

== Overview ==
One of the world's largest trade shows for music products, NAMM restricts entrance to owners, suppliers, distributors, journalists, employees, endorsed artists, and guests of NAMM member companies. Vendors display products, allowing dealers and distributors to see what's new, negotiate deals, and plan their purchasing for the next six to 12 months. The event attracts famous musicians, many of whom are endorsed by exhibitors and come to promote their own signature models and equipment.

A smaller convention, NAMM Summer Session, typically takes place in June or July in Nashville, Tennessee.

== History ==
=== NAPDA Convention (1902–1919) ===
In 1901, 52 members of the National Piano Manufacturers Association of America formed the National Association of Piano Dealers of America (NAPDA). They held the first annual NAPDA Convention in Baltimore in May of the following year. In its early years, the trade show moved to different cities in the eastern United States, including Buffalo (1903), Atlantic City (1904), and Washington, D.C. (1906).

In 1912, the NAPDA became the National Association of Piano Merchants of America (NAPMA), and the show became the NAPMA Convention.

=== NAMM Convention (1920–1975) ===
By 1919, the popularity of early jazz and the marching band music of John Philip Sousa had convinced many piano merchants to produce full lines of band instruments. The NAPMA renamed itself National Association of Music Merchants, or NAMM, and its show became the NAMM Convention. Its location would alternate between New York City and Chicago for the next 50 years.

The NAMM Convention did not take place in 1932 or 1934 due to the economic climate of the Great Depression. In 1937, the first year that attendees were required to register, the NAMM Convention had 248 members in attendance, including 24 piano manufacturers, four organ manufacturers, 11 piano distributors, 10 music publishers, eight radio and phonograph manufacturers, 18 miscellaneous exhibitors, and 10 string instrument manufacturers.

Due to U.S. involvement in World War II, the NAMM Convention did not take place in 1942 or 1945, and in 1943 and 1944 the event was held as the Wartime Educational Conference. The NAMM show resumed in 1946, and was held at The Palmer House Hilton in Chicago.

Beginning in 1970, NAMM added a second annual convention called the Western Seminar or Western Market. Initially held in March in Los Angeles or San Francisco, the annual show was eventually moved to Anaheim, California, in January.

=== NAMM International Music & Sound Expo (1976–2002) ===
In 1976, NAMM rebranded its midyear roving NAMM Convention as the NAMM International Music Expo. The change reflected its evolution from a national retail association into an international association whose members included commercial companies, distributors, affiliates and manufacturers. It renamed its Anaheim-based January convention as the Winter Music & Sound Market in 1979 and the NAMM International Music Market in 1988.

After poor attendance and lack of direction caused the 1990 Chicago Summer NAMM show to be referred to as "the wake on the lake," NAMM moved the summer event to Nashville in 1993, renaming it the NAMM Summer Session and focusing the show on guitars and acoustic instruments.

In 1998, 1999 and 2000, the NAMM International Music Market was held in Los Angeles while the Anaheim Convention Center was renovated.

=== The NAMM Show (2003–present) ===
In 2003, NAMM renamed its January event in Anaheim the NAMM Show.

In 2018, the NAMM Show expanded into the new Anaheim Convention Center North building. The same year, the Audio Engineering Society joined the NAMM Show via "AES at NAMM" and hosted the Parnelli Awards at the convention. In January 2020, the NAMM Show saw record attendance with more than 115,000 attendees and over 7,000 brands represented.

On August 10, 2020, NAMM canceled plans to hold the NAMM Show on January 21–24, 2021, due to the COVID-19 pandemic. Instead, NAMM hosted a virtual event called Believe In Music Week starting January 18, 2021, which NAMM described as:

"...a mix of comprehensive programming and professional education at BelieveinMusic.tv, as well as an interactive marketplace to connect buyers and sellers – all designed to elevate the innovation and inspiration found across the industry while offering support for those most deeply affected by COVID. While not The NAMM Show or a virtual tradeshow, the initiative will meet the immediate business needs of NAMM member companies through thought-leader led education for all segments of the industry, networking and AI matchmaking, and business-to-business-focused opportunities to reaffirm and grow business connections, launch new products, share brand initiatives and engage with customers in real-time."

Believe In Music Week was viewed by more than 500,000 NAMM members.

In June 2022, the NAMM Show returned to Anaheim as an in-person 3-day event. The following year's show, held in April, attracted 46,711 attendees from 120 countries and territories, and 1,200 exhibitors representing 3,500 brands. To celebrate the 40th anniversary of the MIDI standard, lifetime achievement awards were presented to, or posthumously awarded to Don Buchla, Ikutaro Kakehashi, Tsutomu Katoh, Roger Linn, Bob Moog, Tom Oberheim, Alan R. Pearlman, Dave Rossum, and Dave Smith.

From January 25 to 28, 2024, the NAMM Show resumed its familiar January occurrence for the first time since 2020, with over 1,600 booths representing more than 3,500 brands and over 62,000 attendees.

== See also ==
- TEC Awards: awarded during the NAMM Show
- She Rocks Awards: awarded during the NAMM Show
- Parnelli Awards: awarded during the NAMM Show
- NAMM Oral History Program
