= Women's Audio Mission =

Non-profit organization in California, US

Women's Audio Mission is a non-profit organization and recording studio complex based in San Francisco and Oakland, California, whose mission is to promote "the advancement of women and gender-diverse people in music production and the recording arts."

== History ==
Women's Audio Mission (WAM) was founded by Terri Winston in 2003 to combat chronic gender inequity in the music and sound industries (fewer than 5% of the people creating everyday sounds and media are women or gender-diverse) and "change the face of sound." Winston, who got a bachelor's degree in Electrical Engineering from Purdue University, is a multi-instrumentalist who toured with PJ Harvey, The Pixies, and The Flaming Lips. Winston started with a career in recording and engineering. Her father was an engineer and she "grew up in research labs around engineers that were always pulling pranks" on her; as a result, she said, she developed the thick skin necessary for a woman to succeed "in male-dominated careers". In the early 2000s, Winston was a tenured recording engineer professor and Director of the Sound Recording Arts program at City College of San Francisco when she founded WAM. She has served as Executive Director since.

WAM runs the only professional recording studios in the world specifically built and run by women with a gender-diverse staff, with much of the equipment donated by various manufacturers. Facilities are located in downtown San Francisco, in the former SF Sound Works studio, and in Fruitvale, Oakland. They are home to projects by Beyoncé's Band, Toro y Moi, Alanis Morissette, Denise Perrier, Radiohead, R.E.M., and Timbaland.

== Accomplishments ==
- Over the past 19 years, WAM has provided training and mentoring to 22,000+ women, girls, and gender-diverse individuals
- Provided programs across three cities (San Francisco, Oakland, and San Jose), five school districts, 50+ school partners
- Awarded a $1M grant from MacKenzie Scott to seed a $9M national expansion campaign
- Named "Best Hope for the Future of Music" by San Francisco Weekly
- Featured in Forbes, Billboard magazine, and on the cover of the San Francisco Chronicle Datebook for success in bringing training programs online during COVID-19
- 1,000+ women and gender-diverse students placed in creative tech/STEM jobs (Dolby Labs, Sony, Pixar, Disney, Pandora, Google, Facebook, ESPN, etc.)
- White House Office of Social Innovation studied WAM's revolutionary methods of using music and media to attract at-risk girls to STEM studies as part of President Obama's "Educate to Innovate" program
- Advisor to both the Recording Academy (GRAMMYs) & Academy of Country Music's Diversity, Equity, and Inclusion Task Forces
- Produced or recorded award-winning projects or performances for 400+ artists, including Sheila E., Beyoncé's Band, Kronos Quartet, Neko Case, Angélique Kidjo (2014 GRAMMY), tUnE-yArDs, Toro Y Moi, etc., providing paid freelance work and critical professional credits for 450+ women and gender-diverse engineers.

== Programs ==
=== Girls on the Mic ===
A training and mentoring after-school program that provides over 2,000/year Bay Area girls and gender-diverse youth from under-resourced communities (96% low income, 93% BIPOC, ages 11–18) with free music, audio production, recording arts, and creative technology training in a professional studio environment.

WAM also organizes online classes; their Sound Channel program contains "animated, interactive e-textbooks that include audio examples, video demonstrations, DIY projects and quizzes" and was, according to Winston, used by 6,900 students in more than 131 countries.

=== WAM Academy ===
These adult education classes provide music, audio production and recording arts certification training to over 1,000 women and gender-diverse individuals a year and include courses such as: Live Sound 101, Podcasting, Introduction to Mastering, and ProTools 101.

=== Internship program ===
This internal internship provides a paid position, professional skills training, mentoring, direct connections to corporate recruiters and mentors, and job placement to 30-40 women and gender-diverse individuals a year. WAM has placed over 1,000 interns in paid positions in the industry through this program.

=== WAMCon ===
These national music production and recording technology conferences have reached over 1,500 women and gender-diverse producers and engineers in cities across the US (Los Angeles, New York, Nashville, Boston) with award-winning female and gender-diverse audio professional mentors that have worked with artists including Beyoncé to Alicia Keys.

=== Artist Recording Residencies ===
These studio residencies provide 5-10 local BIPOC female and gender-diverse artists a year with free recording services and mentoring, while providing work experience and professional credits to female and gender-diverse music producers and engineers.

=== Local Sirens: Women in Music Concert Series ===
A free, quarterly performance series that promotes Bay Area women and gender-diverse artists and ensembles and has historically reached Bay Area audiences of over 2,000 per year.
