= Tour de La Sensitive =

1994 concert tour by the Red Hot Chili Peppers

- Tour by Red Hot Chili Peppers
- Promotional poster for October 19, 1994
- Start date: August 10, 1994
- End date: October 21, 1994
- Legs: 1
- No. of shows: 11

Red Hot Chili Peppers concert chronology
- Blood Sugar Sex Magik Tour (1991–1993); Tour de La Sensitive (1994); One Hot Minute Tour (1995–1997)

Tour de La Sensitive was a short 1994 concert tour by the Red Hot Chili Peppers and their first with guitarist Dave Navarro, who joined the band in 1993.

== Background ==
The band had just finished their hugely successful Blood Sugar Sex Magik Tour which saw the departure of guitarist John Frusciante in 1992. The band quickly regrouped and replaced him with Arik Marshall, who would finish out the remainder of the tour. Following the tour in 1993, the band began work on their next album but the chemistry with Marshall just wasn't there so they decided to fire him. Again left without a guitarist the band decided to hold open auditions by taking out an ad in the newspaper which was a total mess due to all the people showing up. One of the guitarists that showed up was Buckethead who claimed to have never even heard of the band or their songs. The band enjoyed his rehearsal however Flea felt he didn't mesh well with the band's sound. Shortly after the failed auditions, singer Anthony Kiedis ended up discovering Jesse Tobias, guitarist for a local L.A. band called Mother Tongue. The band asked Tobias to join, which he accepted; they started writing and rehearsing for the next album. Drummer Chad Smith informed the band that Navarro, who after turning them down once in 1992 after the departure of John Frusciante was finally ready to join. Tobias was fired and Navarro was hired as the band's seventh guitarist in September 1993.

The band went right into writing for the next album and decided to mount a short tour titled Tour de La Sensitive which was named after the fake biker gang nickname, Los Sensitives that Navarro gave four members. The tour saw the band performing a memorable set at Woodstock '94 which featured them in lightbulb costumes, which Navarro hated and dressed as Jimi Hendrix for their encore, and two opening dates for The Rolling Stones which singer Anthony Kiedis has said was a miserable experience. The tour was the first to feature songs that would be recorded for the 1995 album, One Hot Minute.

== Songs performed ==
Originals

The Red Hot Chili Peppers

- "Grand Pappy du Plenty" (used as intro jam to "Give It Away")

Freaky Styley

- "Hollywood (Africa)" (The Meters) (tease)

The Uplift Mofo Party Plan

- "Backwoods"
- "Me and My Friends
- "Organic Anti-Beat Box Band"

Mother's Milk

- "Higher Ground" (Stevie Wonder)
- "Nobody Weird Like Me"
- "Stone Cold Bush"

Blood Sugar Sex Magik

- "Blood Sugar Sex Magik"
- "Give It Away"
- "If You Have to Ask"
- "My Lovely Man"
- "The Power of Equality"
- "Suck My Kiss"
- "Under the Bridge"

Out in LA

- "Flea Fly"

One Hot Minute

- "Aeroplane"
- "Deep Kick" (outro only sung by Flea)
- "Pea"
- "Walkabout" (intro only)
- "Warped"

Cover songs (used as intros or during jams unless otherwise noted)
- "Cornocupia" (Black Sabbath)
- "If You Got Funk, You Got Style" (Parliament-Funkadelic)
- "Three Days" (Jane's Addiction)
- "Tonight I'm Going to Rock You Tonight" (Spinal Tap)

== Tour overview ==
The band were already rehearsing and writing for their next album while on this tour. Songs such as "Aeroplane" "Pea" and "Warped", which would appear on One Hot Minute, were performed for the first time although not all of the songs had complete lyrics that would be featured on the studio versions. The band also played intros and outros to "Deep Kick" and "Walkabout"; however, the full songs were not played until the tour to support the album. The instrumental song "Grand Pappy du Plenty" from their 1984 debut made its return for the first time since 1988 when it was used as an intro to "Give It Away".

In 2016, the band's performance at Woodstock '94 was made available on CD and Vinyl, however, it wasn't officially released by the band.

== Tour dates ==
Date	City	Country	Venue
North America
August ??, 1994	Los Angeles	United States	The Viper Room
August 10, 1994	Los Angeles	United States	Club Lingerie
August 14, 1994^{[A]}	Saugerties	United States	Winston Farm
August 17, 1994	New York City	United States	Academy Theater
August 19, 1994	New York City	United States	Roseland Ballroom
Europe
August 25, 1994^{[B]}	Dublin	Ireland	Sunstroke Festival - Dalymount Park
August 27, 1994^{[C]}	Hasselt	Belgium	Pukkelpop - Kempische Steenweg
August 28, 1994^{[D]}	Reading	England	Reading Festival - Little John's Farm
August 31, 1994	Madrid	Spain	Plaza de toros de Las Ventas
September 3, 1994	Roskilde	Denmark	Heyday #1 Festival - Festivalpladsen
North America
October 19, 1994^{[E]}	Pasadena	United States	Rose Bowl
October 21, 1994^{[E]}	Pasadena	United States	Rose Bowl

Festivals and other miscellaneous performances
^{A} This concert was a part of "Woodstock '94"
^{B} This concert was a part of the "Sunstroke Festival"
^{C} This concert was a part of the "Pukkelpop festival"
^{D} This concert was a part of the "Reading Festival"
^{E} These concerts were a part of the Rolling Stones' "Voodoo Lounge Tour"

== Personnel ==
- Flea - bass, backing vocals
- Anthony Kiedis - lead vocals, guitar (on Give It Away)
- Dave Navarro - guitar, backing vocals
- Chad Smith - drums
