= Woodstock 1994 (Red Hot Chili Peppers album) =

Live album (bootleg) by Red Hot Chili Peppers
- Released: 2016
- Recorded: August 14, 1994 (Saugerties, New York)
- Genre: Alternative rock; funk rock
- Language: English
- Label: Sonic Boom (CD); Let Them Eat Vinyl (LP)

Woodstock 1994 is a bootleg recording and an unofficial release of the Red Hot Chili Peppers, recorded on August 14, 1994 at Woodstock '94. The concert was released on CD and 2-LP vinyl in 2016.

This concert was part of the band's Tour de La Sensitive and was the first performance with guitarist Dave Navarro (according to the book Scar Tissue by Anthony Kiedis). The performance featured the live debut of the songs "Aeroplane", "Warped", and "Pea" which would be featured on the band's 1995 album, One Hot Minute, although with slightly different lyrics than the live versions performed at Woodstock '94.

== Track listing ==
1. "Grand Pappy Du Plenty"
2. "Give It Away"
3. "Suck My Kiss"
4. "Warped"
5. "Stone Cold Bush"
6. "If You Have to Ask"
7. "Organic Anti-Beat Box Band"
8. "Aeroplane"
9. "Blood Sugar Sex Magik"
10. "Pea"
11. "My Lovely Man"
12. "Higher Ground"
13. "Under the Bridge"
14. "Me and My Friends"
15. "The Power of Equality"

== Personnel ==
- Flea – Bass, backing vocals
- Anthony Kiedis – lead vocals, guitar on "Grand Pappy Du Plenty/Give It Away"
- Dave Navarro – guitar, backing vocals
- Chad Smith – drums
