= Live Rare Remix Box =

Box set by Red Hot Chili Peppers
- Released: February 24, 1994
- Recorded: 1991–1993
- Genres: Funk rock; alternative rock
- Label: Warner Bros.
- Producer: Rick Rubin

Red Hot Chili Peppers chronology
What Hits!? (1992)	Live Rare Remix Box (1994)	The Plasma Shaft (1994)

Professional ratings
Review scores
Source	Rating
AllMusic	3.5/5 stars

Live Rare Remix Box is a compilation box set released by the Red Hot Chili Peppers in 1994. It contains three CDs, which are named individually Live, Rare and Remix. The live, rare, and remix tracks in question are essentially the collected B-sides from all five singles taken from the band's hugely successful 1991 album, Blood Sugar Sex Magik.

== Background ==
Despite the world-wide success of Blood Sugar Sex Magik, guitarist John Frusciante's 1992 departure from the band left them struggling through a string of guitarists until they recruited former Jane's Addiction guitarist Dave Navarro in 1993. Although the band recorded the instrumental tracks for their then forthcoming One Hot Minute album in 1994, singer Anthony Kiedis relapsed into drug use in late 1993 which delayed his recording of the vocal tracks until 1995, when the album was finally released.

As a result of such delays, it is likely that the Live Rare Remix Box release was used as a stop-gap to appease fans until the band finally finished and released One Hot Minute after a four-year recording gap. In addition, it contains "Soul to Squeeze", which had been a successful single but did not appear on Blood Sugar Sex Magik. This set is particularly notable for including all the remixes from the rare "If You Have to Ask" single. It does not, however, include every remix of "Give It Away" or radio edits of any song. The set nevertheless remains a concise alternative to purchasing every single from the period and is therefore popular with fans.

The same year, The Plasma Shaft was released in Australia and Japan, which features a smaller selection of rarities including two radio edits.

The box set was part of a series of Warner Bros. box sets of rarities taken from a specific album, a series which also included R.E.M.'s The Automatic Box.

== Track listing ==
Live disc

1. "Give It Away" (In Progress) – 3:43
2. "Nobody Weird Like Me" (Live) – 5:03
3. "Suck My Kiss" (Live) – 3:45
4. "I Could Have Lied" (Live) – 4:33

Rare disc

1. "Soul to Squeeze" – 4:50
2. "Fela’s Cock" – 5:10
3. "Sikamikanico" – 3:25
4. "Search and Destroy" (The Stooges cover) – 3:34

Remix disc

1. "Give It Away" (12" Mix) – 6:02
2. "Give It Away" (Rasta Mix) – 6:47
3. "If You Have to Ask" (The Disco Krisco Mix) – 7:32
4. "If You Have to Ask" (Scott & Garth Mix) – 7:12
5. "If You Have to Ask" (The Friday Night Fever Blister Mix) – 6:34
