= The Plasma Shaft =

Compilation album by Red Hot Chili Peppers
- Released: June 27, 1994
- Recorded: 1991–1993
- Genre: Funk rock; alternative rock
- Length: 37:59
- Label: Warner Bros.
- Producer: Rick Rubin

Red Hot Chili Peppers chronology
Live Rare Remix Box (1994)	The Plasma Shaft (1994)	Out in L.A. (1994)

The Plasma Shaft is a compilation box set of the Red Hot Chili Peppers. It was released in Australia and Japan as a bonus to Blood Sugar Sex Magik in a separate jewel case in 1994. It contains two discs: the normal Blood Sugar Sex Magik disc with all 17 tracks and a bonus disc with 8 tracks recorded during the sessions for the album, all of which were already released as B-sides to various singles, including the hit single "Soul to Squeeze".

== Track listing ==
1. "Give It Away" (In Progress) – 4:36
2. "If You Have to Ask" (Radio Mix) – 3:37
3. "Nobody Weird Like Me" (Live) (Note: Printed as Nobody Weird (Live).) – 5:05
4. "Sikamikanico" (Note: Misprinted as Sikiamikanico.) – 3:24
5. "Breaking the Girl" (Radio Edit) – 4:29
6. "Fela's Cock" – 5:16
7. "If You Have to Ask" (Friday Night Fever Blister Mix) – 6:35
8. "Soul to Squeeze" – 4:50

== Charts ==
Chart (1994)	Peak position
Australian Albums (ARIA)	6

== Certifications ==
Region	Certification	Certified units/sales
Australia (ARIA)	Gold	35,000^{^}
^{^} Shipments figures based on certification alone.
