= Coffee Shop (Red Hot Chili Peppers song) =

Single by Red Hot Chili Peppers

from the album One Hot Minute
- Released: August 12, 1996
- Recorded: 1995
- Genre: Funk metal
- Length: 3:08
- Label: Warner Bros.
- Songwriters: Anthony Kiedis, Flea, Dave Navarro, Chad Smith
- Producer: Rick Rubin

Red Hot Chili Peppers singles chronology
"Shallow Be Thy Game" (1996)	"Coffee Shop" (1996)	"Love Rollercoaster" (1996)

Music video
- "Coffee Shop" on YouTube

"Coffee Shop" is a song by American rock musical group Red Hot Chili Peppers and was the fifth and final single from their 1995 album, One Hot Minute. The CD single was released only in Germany and featured the same cover image as the previous single "Shallow Be Thy Game".

== Music video ==
Despite the single not being released outside of Germany, the music video, which was directed by Gavin Bowden, was released in the United States. The video featured the album track being played over live footage of the band.

== Live performances ==
"Coffee Shop" was performed a total of 39 times on the One Hot Minute Tour. However, like most of the songs from the album, it hasn't been performed since that tour and was last performed on July 11, 1996.

== Track listing ==
CD single (1996)

1. "Coffee Shop"
2. "Coffee Shop" (live May 14, 1996 at the Sydney Entertainment Centre)
3. "Give It Away" (live May 14, 1996 at the Sydney Entertainment Centre)
