= My Friends (Red Hot Chili Peppers song) =

1995 single by Red Hot Chili Peppers

Single by Red Hot Chili Peppers

from the album One Hot Minute
- B-side: "Let's Make Evil"; "Stretch"
- Released: October 9, 1995
- Genre: Alternative rock
- Length: 4:02
- Label: Warner Bros.
- Songwriters: Anthony Kiedis; Flea; Dave Navarro; Chad Smith
- Producer: Rick Rubin

Red Hot Chili Peppers singles chronology
"Warped" (1995)	"My Friends" (1995)	"Aeroplane" (1996)

Music video
- "My Friends" on YouTube

Music video
- "My Friends (Version 2)" on YouTube

"My Friends" is a song by American rock band Red Hot Chili Peppers and the fourth track on their sixth studio album, One Hot Minute (1995). It is a melodic ballad and was released in October 1995 by Warner Bros. Records as the second single from the album. It is the only song from One Hot Minute to be included on their Greatest Hits compilation, though the music video for "Aeroplane" appears on the DVD. It became the band's third number-one single on the US Billboard Hot Modern Rock Tracks chart, where it remained for four consecutive weeks, and their first number one on the Billboard Album Rock Tracks chart, making it the band's first single to top both charts.

The single features two unreleased B-sides. "Stretch" (originally titled Stretch You Out) was intended for the album following the fade out of "One Big Mob". The two were planned to be one song titled "One Big Mob/Stretch You Out" however "Stretch" was not included.

== Critical reception ==
Siân Pattenden from Smash Hits gave "My Friends" a score of four out of five, complimenting it as "a touching lullaby about how ace friends are, even when they're glum. Anthony Kiedis' voice is both brutal and plaintive. A proper song. Absolutely ace."

== Music videos ==
The surreal original music video for "My Friends" depicts the band in many incarnations on a small boat, stranded in a large stretch of treacherous water. This video was directed by Anton Corbijn.

A second video was made for the song, directed by Gavin Bowden, where they were in a studio performing the song. The video was shot in late 1994 at the start of the recording sessions for One Hot Minute, which is why Flea had a beard in the video. It appears on their Greatest Hits DVD.

== Live performances ==
"My Friends" was performed regularly during the One Hot Minute Tour. However, it hasn't been performed in full since 1996, only teased.

On October 2, 2021, Chad Smith and Dave Navarro performed "My Friends" together for the first time in 25 years at the Ohana Festival. They were joined by Taylor Hawkins on vocals, Pat Smear on guitar and Chris Chaney on bass.

== Track listings ==
- CD and 12-inch single (1995)
1. "My Friends" (album)
2. "Coffee Shop" (album)
3. "Let's Make Evil" (previously unreleased)
4. "Stretch" (previously unreleased)
- CD version 2 (1995)
1. "My Friends" (album)
2. "Coffee Shop" (album)
3. "Let's Make Evil" (previously unreleased)

== Personnel ==
Red Hot Chili Peppers

- Anthony Kiedis – lead and backing vocals
- Flea – bass, backing vocals
- Dave Navarro – guitar
- Chad Smith – drums

Additional musicians

- Lenny Castro – percussion

== Charts ==
=== Weekly charts ===
Chart (1995–1996)	Peak position
Australia (ARIA)	15
Canada Top Singles (RPM)	11
Canada Rock/Alternative (RPM)	1
Europe (Eurochart Hot 100)	70
Europe (European Hit Radio)	21
European Alternative Rock (Music & Media)	2
France (SNEP)	40
France Airplay (Music & Media)	9
Germany (GfK)	81
Iceland (Íslenski Listinn Topp 40)	4
Italy Airplay (Music & Media)	20
Netherlands (Single Top 100 Tipparade)	17
New Zealand (Recorded Music NZ)	20
Poland Airplay (Music & Media)	19
Scottish Singles Sales (Official Charts)	35
Spain Airplay (Music & Media)	15
Sweden (Sverigetopplistan)	50
UK Singles (Official Charts)	29
US Radio Songs (Billboard)	27
US Adult Alternative Airplay (Billboard)	4
US Alternative Airplay (Billboard)	1
US Mainstream Rock (Billboard)	1

=== Year-end charts ===
Chart (1995)	Position
Canada Rock/Alternative (RPM)	4
Iceland (Íslenski Listinn Topp 40)	99
Latvia (Latvijas Top 40)	145
US Modern Rock Tracks (Billboard)	37

Chart (1996)	Position
Canada Top Singles (RPM)	99
Iceland (Íslenski Listinn Topp 40)	85
US Mainstream Rock Tracks (Billboard)	18
US Modern Rock Tracks (Billboard)	56

== Release history ==
Region	Version	Date	Format(s)	Label(s)	Ref(s).
United States	"My Friends"	September 26, 1995	Rock; contemporary hit radio	Warner Bros.	
United Kingdom	"My Friends"	October 9, 1995	12-inch vinyl; CD; cassette	Warner Bros.	
Japan	"Warped" / "My Friends"	October 10, 1995	CD	Warner Bros.	
Australia	"My Friends"	October 23, 1995	CD; cassette	Warner Bros.	
