= Soul to Squeeze =

1993 single by Red Hot Chili Peppers

Single by Red Hot Chili Peppers

from the album Coneheads: Music from the Motion Picture Soundtrack
- Released: August 17, 1993
- Length: 4:52
- Label: Warner Bros.
- Songwriters: Anthony Kiedis; John Frusciante; Flea; Chad Smith
- Producer: Rick Rubin

Red Hot Chili Peppers singles chronology
"If You Have to Ask" (1993)	"Soul to Squeeze" (1993)	"Warped" (1995)

Music video
- "Soul To Squeeze" on YouTube

"Soul to Squeeze" is a song by the American rock band Red Hot Chili Peppers that was originally recorded during the production of their fifth studio album, Blood Sugar Sex Magik (1991). Although it was not featured on the record and was used as a B-side on the singles "Give It Away" and "Under the Bridge", "Soul to Squeeze" was later released as a single in 1993 by Warner Bros. Records. The song was included in the Coneheads film soundtrack. "Soul to Squeeze" was eventually re-released for the 2003 Greatest Hits album. It is on the band's Live Rare Remix Box and The Plasma Shaft albums.

"Soul to Squeeze" became a success when it peaked at number one on the US Billboard Modern Rock Tracks chart. The single also peaked at number 22 on the Billboard Hot 100 and number seven on the Billboard Album Rock Tracks chart. In Australia, Canada, Iceland, and New Zealand, the song reached the top 10. In Sweden, it became the band's first single to chart, peaking at number 13.

== Music video ==
The music video for "Soul to Squeeze" was directed by Kevin Kerslake and was shot in black and white. The video is "set at a traveling circus with the band members playing various 'freaks' and makes several references to [Coneheads], including a cameo from Chris Farley". John Frusciante does not appear in the video, as he had left the band a little over a year before it was filmed.

== Track listings ==
- CD version 1
1. "Soul to Squeeze"
2. "Nobody Weird Like Me" (Live)
3. "Suck My Kiss" (Live)
- CD version 2 (card cover)
1. "Soul to Squeeze"
2. "Nobody Weird Like Me" (Live)
- CD version 3 (EP)
1. "Soul to Squeeze"
2. "Nobody Weird Like Me" (Live)
3. "If You Have to Ask" (Friday Night Fever Blister Mix)
4. "If You Have to Ask" (Disco Krisco Mix)
5. "If You Have to Ask" (Scott And Garth Mix)
6. "If You Have to Ask"
7. "Give It Away" (Edit)
- Cassette single
1. "Soul to Squeeze"
2. "Nobody Weird Like Me" (Live)

== Personnel ==
Red Hot Chili Peppers

- Anthony Kiedis – lead vocals
- Flea – bass
- John Frusciante – guitar
- Chad Smith – drums, tambourine

Additional musicians

- Brendan O'Brien – organ, mixing

== Charts ==
=== Weekly charts ===
Chart (1993)	Peak position
Australia (ARIA)	9
Canada Retail Singles (The Record)	1
Canada Top Singles (RPM)	11
Europe (Eurochart Hot 100)	88
Iceland (Íslenski Listinn Topp 40)	9
Quebec (ADISQ)	42
New Zealand (Recorded Music NZ)	6
Spain Airplay (Music & Media)	13
Sweden (Sverigetopplistan)	13
Switzerland (Schweizer Hitparade)	32
US Billboard Hot 100	22
US Alternative Airplay (Billboard)	1
US Mainstream Rock Airplay (Billboard)	7
US Pop Airplay (Billboard)	26
US Cash Box Top 100	15

=== Year-end charts ===
Chart (1993)	Position
Australia (ARIA)	49
Canada Top Singles (RPM)	89
Iceland (Íslenski Listinn Topp 40)	34
Sweden (Topplistan)	37
US Album Rock Tracks (Billboard)	30
US Modern Rock Tracks (Billboard)	6

=== Decade-end charts ===
Chart (1990–1999)	Position
Canada (Nielsen SoundScan)	89

== Certifications ==
Region	Certification	Certified units/sales
Australia (ARIA)	Gold	35,000^{^}
^{^} Shipments figures based on certification alone.

== Release history ==
Region	Date	Format(s)	Label(s)	Ref.
United States	July 20, 1993	Album rock; modern rock radio	Warner Bros.	
Europe	August 17, 1993	CD	Warner Bros.	
Japan	January 25, 1994	CD	Warner Bros.	

== See also ==
- List of Billboard Modern Rock Tracks number ones of the 1990s
