= Shallow Be Thy Game =

Song by Red Hot Chili Peppers

Single by Red Hot Chili Peppers

from the album One Hot Minute
- B-side: "Walkabout", "Suck My Kiss" (Live)
- Released: June 10, 1996
- Recorded: 1995
- Genre: Funk metal, alternative metal
- Length: 4:33
- Label: Warner Bros.
- Songwriter(s): Anthony Kiedis, Flea, Dave Navarro, Chad Smith
- Producer(s): Rick Rubin

Red Hot Chili Peppers singles chronology
"Aeroplane" (1996)	"Shallow Be Thy Game" (1996)	"Coffee Shop" (1996)

"Shallow Be Thy Game" is a song by Red Hot Chili Peppers and was the fourth single from their 1995 album, One Hot Minute. The single was released in Australia only. It was also the only single from the album not to have a music video made for it.

The song is quite polemic in its direct assault on fundamentalist religion, which the lyrics openly mock.

== Live performances ==
Despite being a single, the song was performed a total of four times on the One Hot Minute tour and has not been performed since 1996 and has never been performed in the United States.

== Track listing ==
CD single (1996)

1. "Shallow Be Thy Game" (album)
2. "Walkabout" (album)
3. "Suck My Kiss" (live)

== Charts ==
Chart (1996)	Peak position
Australia (ARIA)	88
