= Aeroplane (song) =

1996 single by Red Hot Chili Peppers

Single by Red Hot Chili Peppers

from the album One Hot Minute
- Released: February 5, 1996
- Genre: Pop; funk
- Length: 4:45 (album version); 4:10 (single edit)
- Label: Warner Bros.
- Songwriters: Anthony Kiedis; Flea; Dave Navarro; Chad Smith
- Producer: Rick Rubin

Red Hot Chili Peppers singles chronology
"My Friends" (1995)	"Aeroplane" (1996)	"Shallow Be Thy Game" (1996)

Music video
- "Aeroplane" on YouTube

"Aeroplane" is a song by American rock band Red Hot Chili Peppers from their sixth studio album, One Hot Minute (1995). It was released in February 1996 by Warner Bros. as the third single from the album and a music video, directed by Gavin Bowden, accompanied its release. The song was written by Anthony Kiedis, Flea, Dave Navarro and Chad Smith, and produced by Rick Rubin. It peaked at number eleven on the UK Singles Chart and number eight on the US Billboard Modern Rock Tracks chart. Although the song was left off the band's Greatest Hits album, the music video was included on the accompanying DVD. The song makes references to the band Mazzy Star, and specifically the song "Into Dust" from their 1993 album So Tonight That I Might See.

== Critical reception ==
Larry Flick from Billboard magazine wrote, "This delightful flight of fancy from the Chili Peppers shows why the act continues to succeed in spite of a frequently changing lineup and evolving musical tastes. An attractive pop tune pepped up with Flea's characteristic funk bass, 'Aeroplane' may not be the Peppers' finest piece, but it is exceptionally radio friendly." In a review of One Hot Minute, which was named Album of the Week, Music & Media said, "Both old and new fans have their way with the popsing-along 'Aeroplane'." Sylvia Patterson from NME viewed it as a "ridiculous funk-doodle bass workout".

== Chart performance ==
The single peaked at number eight on the US Billboard Modern Rock Tracks chart where "My Friends" hit number one and "Warped" hit number seven. However, it outperformed "Warped"'s number 13 placing on the Billboard Mainstream Rock Tracks chart (where "My Friends" was also a number one hit) by peaking at number 12. It was the only crossover hit from the album hitting number 30 on the Billboard Mainstream Top 40 chart where the other two singles failed to do. It was also the highest-charting single in the UK from the album, peaking at number 11.

== Music video ==
The music video for "Aeroplane", directed by Gavin Bowden, features the band performing on a colorful set, surrounded by young women dancing in gold costumes, aerialists on trapezes, and a group of children, known as The Aeroplane Kids, dressed as airplanes who appear towards the end of the video. Flea's daughter Clara Balzary was one of the kids in the video and along with her classmates, which included Askia Ndegéocello, son of Meshell Ndegéocello, provided backing vocals on the song as well. The video was visually inspired by the work of Busby Berkeley (an American film director known for his elaborate sets and his bombastic musical numbers that featured carefully-choreographed showgirls) and makes direct homages to a number of Berkeley films, including 42nd Street (1933), Bathing Beauty (1944), Million Dollar Mermaid (1952), and Easy To Love (1953).

Kiedis has said that it's his least favorite Red Hot Chili Peppers video; Smith similarly disliked it, and during the filming, said that it "look[ed] like a dog food commercial". Part of this dislike was because the band originally intended for the video to be "more sexually provocative": According to Kiedis, the group originally wanted to go "hardcore with the tits and the ass ... showing the extreme power and beauty of the female form and all of the energy within". Reportedly, after an employee at Warner Bros. Records voiced concern that such a take would be inappropriate, the band was forced to tone down their vision.

== Live performances ==
"Aeroplane" was the third most performed song during the band's One Hot Minute Tour. However, like all songs from the One Hot Minute album, with the exception of "Pea", it wasn't performed again following the departure of Dave Navarro until February 6, 2016, at Pier 70 in San Francisco, where the song was performed for the first time since 1997. The song was brought back into setlist rotation beginning with The Getaway World Tour and was last performed on October 12, 2019, at a private performance.

== Track listing ==
- CD single 1
1. "Aeroplane" (clean edit)
2. "Backwoods" (live) (contains intro tease of "Come As You Are")
3. "Transcending" (live) (contains intro tease of "Hey Joe")
4. "Me and My Friends" (live)

Note: Live tracks recorded in Rotterdam, Holland on October 16, 1995, by Veronica (Kink FM)

- Limited edition CD single 2
1. "Aeroplane" (album version)
2. "Suck My Kiss" (live)
3. "Suffragette City" (David Bowie) (live)

Note: Live tracks were recorded in Rotterdam, Holland on October 16, 1995, by Veronica (Kink FM)

== Personnel ==
Red Hot Chili Peppers

- Anthony Kiedis – lead vocals
- Dave Navarro – guitar
- Flea – bass, backing vocals
- Chad Smith – drums

The "Aeroplane" Kids

- Clara Balzary – backing vocals
- Bailey Reise – backing vocals
- Askia Ndegéocello – backing vocals
- Nadia Wehbe – backing vocals
- Sarabeth Kelly – backing vocals
- Matthew Kelly – backing vocals
- Phillip Greenspan – backing vocals
- Perry Greenspan – backing vocals
- Veronica Twigg – backing vocals
- Remy Greeno – backing vocals
- C.J. Chipley – backing vocals
- Jaclyn DiMaggio – backing vocals
- Hayley Oakes – backing vocals
- Nikolai Giefer – backing vocals
- Taiana Giefer – backing vocals
- Nina Rothburg – backing vocals
- Sheera Ehrig – backing vocals
- Jade Chacon – backing vocals

== Charts ==
=== Weekly charts ===
Chart (1996)	Peak position
Australia (ARIA)	35
Canada Top Singles (RPM)	48
Canada Rock/Alternative (RPM)	1
Europe (Eurochart Hot 100)	59
Iceland (Íslenski Listinn Topp 40)	2
Netherlands (Single Top 100 Tipparade)	12
New Zealand (Recorded Music NZ)	26
Scottish Singles Sales (Official Charts)	12
UK Singles (Official Charts)	11
US Radio Songs (Billboard)	49
US Alternative Airplay (Billboard)	8
US Mainstream Rock Airplay (Billboard)	12
US Pop Airplay (Billboard)	30

=== Year-end charts ===
Chart (1996)	Position
Canada Rock/Alternative (RPM)	19
Iceland (Íslenski Listinn Topp 40)	28
US Mainstream Rock Tracks (Billboard)	52
US Modern Rock Tracks (Billboard)	41

== Release history ==
Region	Date	Format(s)	Label(s)	Ref.
United Kingdom	February 5, 1996	CD; cassette	Warner Bros.	
Japan	March 10, 1996	CD	Warner Bros.	
United States	March 12, 1996	Contemporary hit radio	Warner Bros.	
