= If You Have to Ask =

Song by Red Hot Chili Peppers

Single by Red Hot Chili Peppers

from the album Blood Sugar Sex Magik
- Released: February 1993
- Recorded: Between February and March 1991
- Studio: The Mansion, Los Angeles, California
- Genre: Funk rock, alternative rock
- Length: 3:37
- Label: Warner Bros.
- Songwriter(s): Flea, Frusciante, Kiedis, Smith
- Producer(s): Rick Rubin

Red Hot Chili Peppers singles chronology
| "Behind the Sun" (1992) | "If You Have to Ask" (1993) | "Soul to Squeeze" (1993) |

"If You Have to Ask" is a song by the Red Hot Chili Peppers from their 1991 studio album Blood Sugar Sex Magik. It was released in Europe and Australia as the album's fifth and final single in 1993.

A music video was made, but merely consists of live footage of the band from a 1992 show at the Winter Show Buildings in Wellington, New Zealand overdubbed with the original album track. The video is notable because it is one of only two videos to feature guitarist Arik Marshall ("Breaking the Girl" being the other). The video was rarely aired on music television and the song along with the video was not featured on the band's Greatest Hits album. Like the song "Aeroplane" from their 1995 album One Hot Minute, it was one of the two music videos from the Warner era not available on their official app.

The verses of the song consist of a scratchy, minimalist funk lick played on the guitar, a flow rap drum beat with clearly ghost notes, and a busier bass melody. The lyrics in the verses are a stream of consciousness style run of non-sequiturs, which the chorus then explains by stating "If you have to ask, you'll never know". While guitarist John Frusciante finishes the solo at the end of the song, the production crew and the band can be heard applauding him. However, no attempts were made to edit out the applause or to re-record it like with all other unintended sounds found on the album.

== Live performances ==
"If You Have to Ask" has been a regular on the setlists of most Red Hot Chili Peppers' tours since its release, having been performed 293 times.

== Track listing ==
CD single (1993)

1. "If You Have to Ask" (edit)
2. "If You Have to Ask" (Disco Krisco Mix)
3. "If You Have to Ask" (Scott And Garth Mix)
4. "Give It Away" (In Progress)

12" single (1993)

1. "If You Have to Ask" (Disco Krisco Mix)
2. "If You Have to Ask" (album)
3. "If You Have to Ask" (Friday Night Fever Blister Mix)
4. "Give It Away" (In Progress)

== Personnel ==
Red Hot Chili Peppers

- Anthony Kiedis - lead vocals
- John Frusciante - guitar, backing vocals
- Flea - bass, backing vocals
- Chad Smith - drums, tambourine

Additional musicians

- Brendan O'Brien - synthesizer

== Charts ==
Weekly chart performance for "If You Have to Ask"
| Chart (1993) | Peak position |
|---|---|
| Australia (ARIA) | 106 |
