= One Hot Minute =

Studio album by Red Hot Chili Peppers
- Released: September 12, 1995
- Recorded: June 1994 – February 1995
- Studios: The Sound Factory, Hollywood, California; Sound City, Van Nuys, California
- Genres: Funk metal; alternative rock; psychedelic rock; psychedelic funk
- Length: 61:14
- Label: Warner Bros.
- Producer: Rick Rubin

Red Hot Chili Peppers chronology
The Best of Red Hot Chili Peppers (1994)	One Hot Minute (1995)	Under the Covers: Essential Red Hot Chili Peppers (1998)

Singles from One Hot Minute
- 1. "Warped" Released: August 21, 1995; 2. "My Friends" Released: October 9, 1995; 3. "Aeroplane" Released: February 5, 1996; 4. "Shallow Be Thy Game" Released: July 10, 1996 (Australia); 5. "Coffee Shop" Released: August 12, 1996 (Germany)

One Hot Minute is the sixth studio album by American rock band Red Hot Chili Peppers, released on September 12, 1995, by Warner Bros. Records. The worldwide success of the band's previous album Blood Sugar Sex Magik (1991) caused guitarist John Frusciante to become uncomfortable with their popularity, eventually quitting mid-tour in 1992. Following a series of short-term replacements, the band hired guitarist Dave Navarro in 1993; it was his only studio album with the band. Recording for the album took place at the Sound Factory in Hollywood from June 1994 to February 1995. It marked the second collaboration between the band and producer Rick Rubin.

One Hot Minute moves away from the funk of Blood Sugar Sex Magik, instead favoring heavier riffs and, at times, veering toward a psychedelic rock sound. This shift was primarily due to the influence of Navarro, formerly of Jane's Addiction. Vocalist Anthony Kiedis, who had resumed addictions to cocaine and heroin in 1994 after being sober for more than five years, approached his lyricism with a reflective outlook on drugs and their harsh effects. As such, the lyrics reflect mostly dark and melancholy themes. Bassist Flea sang lead vocals on "Pea", as well as the outro of "Deep Kick" and the chorus of the album outtake "Stretch".

One Hot Minute sold more than two million copies and was certified multi-platinum, and reached number four on the US Billboard 200. It also spawned three singles: "Warped", "My Friends" and "Aeroplane". "Shallow Be Thy Game" and "Coffee Shop" were also released as singles outside of the United States. Despite the success of the singles, the album failed to achieve the critical and commercial success of Blood Sugar Sex Magik, with less than half of the sales of that album. Navarro was fired in 1998 due to his drug use, and Frusciante returned to the band shortly thereafter.

== Background ==
Red Hot Chili Peppers had released Blood Sugar Sex Magik in 1991. The album was an instant hit, selling more than seven million copies in the United States, and turned the band into an international sensation. Guitarist John Frusciante was having difficulty coping with the band's newfound fame and began to dislike it. Frusciante often argued with his band mates and sabotaged performances. He began taking heroin and steadily increased his usage of the drug over time. Frusciante ultimately quit the band in 1992, during the Japanese leg of their tour. Frusciante returned to his home in California and became a recluse.

Stunned, the remaining Chili Peppers, who had no suitable replacement, hired Arik Marshall to play the remaining dates after being forced to reschedule. Upon returning to Hollywood, the band placed an ad in the L.A. Weekly for open guitar auditions, which Kiedis considered to be a waste of time. After several months of unsuccessfully looking for a suitable guitarist, drummer Chad Smith suggested Dave Navarro. He had always been the band's first choice, but was busy recording Deconstruction with Eric Avery following the 1991 breakup of Jane's Addiction. Navarro eventually accepted the position after productive jam sessions.

== Recording and production ==
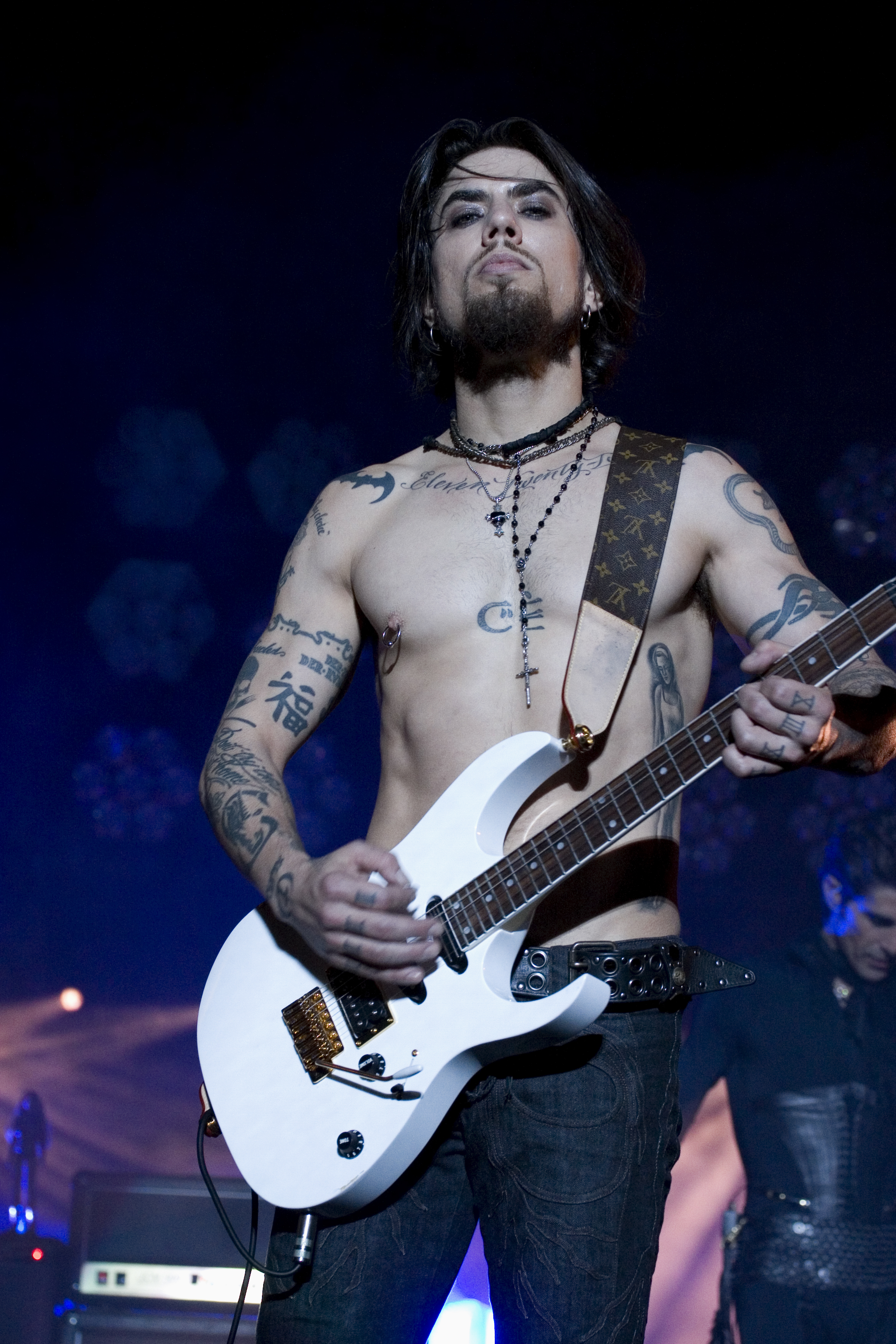
Jane's Addiction guitarist Dave Navarro (pictured in 2009) joined the Red Hot Chili Peppers for the recording of this album.

Kiedis knew that the band's sound would inevitably change when Navarro joined. In June 1994, the band entered The Sound Factory, a recording studio in Los Angeles, to begin recording its next album. The band completed a few basic tracks before Kiedis began having difficulty singing. He'd been through a dental procedure in which an addictive sedative, Valium, was used. The medication triggered a relapse, and he once again became dependent on drugs. Kiedis had slipped from five years of sobriety and began reusing narcotics he'd sworn never to use again. The band took a short break from recording to perform at Woodstock '94, the first show Navarro played with the Peppers.

After resuming production, Navarro questioned the methods of the Peppers' recording procedures. He wondered why such a considerable amount of jamming was involved with the album's conception. Various qualms followed, and the process soon became uncomfortable for the band. Months went by, and only small amounts of material were written. Kiedis made a trip to Grand Rapids, Michigan, in December for Christmas, where his family realized he'd resumed an active addiction once again. He returned to Hollywood in late January 1995, when he finally finished recording his vocals. The rest of the recording was completed within the next month.

John Lurie played harmonica on the title track. Kiedis was a fan of Lurie's group the Lounge Lizards. Lurie became a friend of the band and sat in with them occasionally over the years, mainly as a saxophonist.

== Writing and composition ==
"Warped"
Sample of "Warped", the first single from the album; it incorporated prominent heavy metal riffs and among the darkest lyrics throughout the record.

"Aeroplane"
Sample of "Aeroplane", the third single from One Hot Minute, which included Flea's daughter and her kindergarten class singing background vocals.

Considering that Kiedis had resumed heavy drug use and Frusciante was no longer present for collaboration, songs were written at a far slower rate. Working with Frusciante had been something Kiedis took for granted: "John Frusciante had been a true anomaly when it came to song writing. He made it even easier than Hillel Slovak to create music, even though I'd known Hillel for years. I just figured that was how all guitar players were, that you showed them your lyrics and sang a little bit and the next thing you knew you had a song. That didn't happen right off the bat with Dave." Drummer Chad Smith suggested it was writer's block that was holding Kiedis back from coming up with lyrics, however Kiedis strongly denied this. With the writing process taking too much time and Kiedis returning to his drug habit, for the first time on any of the band's albums, Flea, besides contributing music as usual, wrote some of the lyrics, including "Transcending", his tribute to River Phoenix along with the intro and outro to "Deep Kick", a song that told the story of his and Kiedis's youth. Also, Flea sang lead vocals (to "Pea") for the first time on any album, as well as singing the outro to "Deep Kick" and the chorus of the outtake "Stretch".

Stylistically, One Hot Minute diverged from the Chili Peppers' previous records, especially Blood Sugar Sex Magik. The album was characterized by prominent use of heavy metal guitar riffs and hints of psychedelic rock. Navarro, unlike Flea and Kiedis, was not influenced by funk music. He told Guitar World in 1996, "It doesn't really speak to me. But then again, when I'm playing with three other guys who I love and feel camaraderie with, it's enjoyable to play funk." Navarro's own style was influenced mainly by classic rock guitarists such as Eric Clapton, Jimi Hendrix, Jimmy Page, and Carlos Santana, as well as gothic rock guitarists Robert Smith and Daniel Ash. Continuing a trend that started on Blood Sugar Sex Magik, Kiedis diverged even further away from his signature rapping, only doing so on a few tracks. One Hot Minute took almost two years to write, and its recording and production was not a smooth process. Navarro felt as though he was an outsider to the other members. His writing in Jane's Addiction was independent from other contributors, whereas the Peppers were a far more collaborative group. Navarro himself noted that the band's dynamic was more balanced than that of Jane's Addiction, which was often dominated by frontman Perry Farrell.

Overall, One Hot Minute lyrically confronted the dark, melancholy and remorseful feelings Kiedis kept to himself. Many of the songs were written at a time when he was hiding his resumed addiction. "Warped" directly faced Kiedis's distraught moods as a hysterical cry for help: "My tendency for dependency is offending me/It's upending me/I'm pretending to be strong and free from my dependency/It's warping me." He also felt disappointed that "no one had suspected that I'd slipped from my more than five years of sobriety." The track itself was composed of heavy guitar riffs and echoing vocals which attempted to convey a distressed state. "Aeroplane", the album's third single, was more upbeat than many of the album's songs; but it still contained various references to Kiedis's personal issues: "Looking into my own eyes/I can't find the love I want/Someone better slap me before I start to rust/before I start to decompose." The song also featured Flea's daughter Clara and her kindergarten class singing backing vocals on the last verse. Additionally, "Pea" is targeted at "the guys who beat the shit out of me [Flea] at the Mayfair on Franklin & Bronson".

"Tearjerker" was a tribute to Nirvana lead singer Kurt Cobain. Kiedis felt Cobain's death "was an emotional blow, and we all felt it. I don't know why everyone on earth felt so close to that guy; he was beloved and endearing and inoffensive in some weird way. For all of his screaming and all of his darkness, he was just lovable." "My Friends" addressed more of Kiedis' own somber thoughts rather than those of "his friends": "My friends are so distressed/And standing on the brink of emptiness/No words I know of to express/This emptiness."

Many of the songs were known by alternate/working titles during the recording/writing process: "Swirly" ("Warped"), "Music is My Aeroplane" ("Aeroplane"), "Psychedelic" ("Deep Kick"), "Baseballs" ("Coffee Shop"), "The Pea Song" ("Pea"), "Gang of Four" ("One Big Mob"), "Epic" ("One Hot Minute"), "Frog" ("Shallow Be Thy Game"), "River" ("Transcending"), "Evil" ("Let's Make Evil"), "Punk Blender" ("Blender") "Stretching You Out" ("Stretch"), and "Melancholy Mechanics of My Mind" and "Velvet" ("Melancholy Mechanics").

Black Fish Ferris Wheel was almost the title of the album. Artist Mark Ryden, who designed the One Hot Minute cover artwork, had even come up with a mock design using that as the album's title before the band settled on One Hot Minute. The album also went by various other working titles such as The Sensitives, Turtlehead, The Good and Bad Moods of the Red Hot Chili Peppers and The Blight Album.

=== Outtakes ===
Thirteen songs from the One Hot Minute sessions made it to the final cut of the album. "Melancholy Mechanics" was released as a bonus track on the Japanese pressing of the album, as well as a b-side to the "Warped" single, and "Let's Make Evil" and "Stretch" (originally connected to the end of "One Big Mob") were released on the "My Friends" single. "Bob" (a song about close friend Bob Forrest) would finally surface 11 years later as an iTunes bonus track in 2006. The song features percussion by Stephen Perkins. "The Junkie Song", which was mentioned in interviews and also features Perkins, remains unreleased. "Blender" (described as a short, chaotic song) was one of two songs ("Stretch" being the other) that was dropped from the album's final cut at the last minute. The song has never been released, but resurfaced as a leak in 2023. "The Intimidator" and "Slow Funk", two songs mentioned in interviews by Chad Smith, have never been released. Flea mentioned in interviews that "The Intimidator" was inspired by Miles Davis" while it has been speculated from comments made by Chad Smith that "Slow Funk" was a working title for "Falling Into Grace". There are also various unreleased rough mixes of the album's tracks that included extra instruments, extra lyrics or extended endings.

Additional tracks from the One Hot Minute sessions
Title	Source
"Melancholy Mechanics"	"Warped"
"Let's Make Evil"	"My Friends"
"Stretch"	"My Friends"
"Bob"	iTunes digital edition
"Stretch You Out" (with "One Big Mob" ending)	iTunes digital edition

== Promotion and release ==
While piecing together the final components of the album, the band recorded a video for "Warped". They asked Flea's brother-in-law, Gavin Bowden, to direct it. The video feature the members of the band scantily clad and involved Kiedis and Navarro kissing towards the end as a way of breaking the monotony of cumbersome video recording. Thinking nothing of it, they continued to shoot and finished several days later. Warner Bros., however, saw the video and instantly wanted it thrown away, considering it to be unmarketable and that the kiss and the homoerotic imagery would alienate a large portion of the band's fan base. The band came to a consensus to let the kiss remain on the final cut, prompting a backlash from the college segment of their audience, who took offense at the action. Kiedis said of the situation: "If they couldn't accept what we were doing, we didn't need them anymore."

One Hot Minute was released on September 12, 1995. It was certified Gold just more than two months later on November 11; since then it has gone Double Platinum in the United States. The album peaked at number four on the Billboard Top 200. "My Friends" peaked at number one on the Modern Rock and Mainstream Rock charts. The song also peaked at number 29 on the UK Singles Chart, and "Aeroplane" at number 11. In the UK, One Hot Minute reached number two, the band's highest-charting album there yet, kept off the top spot by Blur's The Great Escape which was released the same week. Several days following the album's release, Kiedis continued to use drugs despite the numerous interviews he was scheduled to attend.

Five singles were released to promote the album: "Warped", "My Friends", "Aeroplane", "Shallow Be Thy Game" (Australia only) and "Coffee Shop" (Germany only). All of the singles with the exception of "Shallow Be Thy Game" received music videos. "My Friends" received two different music videos. The band wasn't pleased with the original video so a second video that featured footage of the band recording the song was released.

== Critical reception ==
Professional ratings
Review scores
Source	Rating
AllMusic	3/5 stars
Entertainment Weekly	B+
The Guardian	3/5 stars
Los Angeles Times	2/4 stars
Mojo	4/5 stars
NME	6/10
Q	4/5 stars
Rolling Stone	3.5/5 stars
Select	3/5 stars
Spin	7/10

One Hot Minute was not as universally well received as Blood Sugar Sex Magik, and was ultimately considered to be a poor follow-up. It did, however, receive mixed to positive reviews from critics. Daina Darzin of Rolling Stone said "One Hot Minute dives into the emotionally deep end of drug addiction and loss", and that the album "is a ferociously eclectic and imaginative disc that also presents the band members as more thoughtful, spiritual—even grown-up. After a 10 plus-year career, they're realizing their potential at last." David Browne of Entertainment Weekly said that "One Hot Minute wails and flails like a mosh-pit workout tape, but it also has moments of outright subtlety and maturity." He goes on to praise Kiedis for "keeping his boorish tendencies under control." Browne, however, criticizes the band for "attempts at cosmic philosophy which often trip up on hippie-dippie sentiments", and some songs "fall back on tired frat-funk flop sweat." "The Peppers work their own little patch with considerable expertise," wrote Peter Kane in Q. "The incoming Navarro rarely fails to deliver the goods and upfront the taut ball of energy going by the name of Anthony Kiedis still makes for a suitably rubbery-lipped frontman, if not exactly a lovable one." Q also included One Hot Minute in its 'best of the year' roundup: "A bulging, blistering blend of a skewed ballads and physically intimidating workouts that charge around like a bull on a promise."

AllMusic's Stephen Thomas Erlewine retrospectively said that "following up Blood Sugar Sex Magik proved to be a difficult task for the Red Hot Chili Peppers", and "Navarro's metallic guitar shredding should have added some weight to the Chili Peppers' punk-inflected heavy-guitar funk, but tends to make it plodding." Erlewine went on to add that "by emphasizing the metal, the funk is gradually phased out of the blend, as is melody." Robert Christgau gave the album a rating of "dud".

"My Friends" was considered by Erlewine to be a blatant attempt to hold on to the mainstream audience gained by "Under the Bridge", and that in contrast, "the melodies are weak and the lyrics are even more feeble." The song also "tries to be a collective hug for all [of Kiedis's] troubled pals." Rolling Stone, on the other hand, said the song was "lovely", and incorporated a "vaguely folky chorus, and sports the same sad wishfulness of 'Under the Bridge' and 'Breaking the Girl'." The article went on to praise "Warped" claiming it "mixes harrowing lyrics with a multi-toned, layered intro and a whirling dervish of noises and big-rock rhythms surfing through and over big, funky hooks. It's like, well, a drug rush." Rolling Stone went on to say that the title track was "funky and fun. It's about love and sex. What the hell. Some things don't have to change." Entertainment Weekly said "some of these songs last a little too long and could have benefited from a trimming", though they credited Kiedis for sounding "nearly spiritual" on "Falling into Grace".

== Unreleased documentary ==
In 1994 and 1995 the band, along with director Gavin Bowden, began work on a documentary, Deep Kick, named after the third track on the album. The documentary was expected to be similar to Funky Monks, which documented the making of Blood Sugar Sex Magik, although it would also feature mini-films intercut featuring each member of the band.

Some footage from the documentary has been released on the internet including Anthony's segment along with a segment of the band with the Velvet Underground's "I'm Waiting for the Man" playing over the footage. Footage from the in-studio version of the "My Friends" music video also came from this shoot. It is unknown if the project was ever completed and if it was, why Warner never released it.

== Tour ==
The One Hot Minute Tour began several days after the release of the album. The band opened the tour with a European leg. Kiedis felt that as a musician, he was becoming somewhat lackluster. The short European leg ended in early November, and the U.S. portion was scheduled to begin 10 days later; however, it was postponed until early February due to Chad Smith breaking his wrist. A few shows into the U.S. leg, Kiedis injured his leg badly while engaging in what he calls "eyes-closed robotic dancing." He tripped over a monitor and fell off the stage, ending up hanging by his calf from his microphone cable, resulting in a cast which he wore for the next two months. Kiedis reflected that it "was nice to see that people were still interested in coming out to see what we do," as there'd been a four-year gap since the release of Blood Sugar Sex Magik. Following the conclusion of the U.S. tour, the band took two weeks off before several Australia and New Zealand performances. The Peppers then played at the Tibetan Freedom Concert in San Francisco in June, before finishing the tour in Europe.

Kiedis had remained sober the entire tour and maintained positive disposition during shows. Navarro, however, was growing tired of touring, and that was beginning to grate on his fellow band-mates. Kiedis suffered an additional injury in Prague after falling off the stage while attempting to execute a back flip. He was forced to wear a back brace for the next few shows, which restricted his actions to the area around his microphone. After shows in Paris and London, the band returned home to Los Angeles. Kiedis began taking drugs once again, though he forced himself to discontinue after several weeks. The band was then asked to play in the North Pole for roughly 100 contest winners of a concert set up by Molson, a Canadian beer company. While the show was mildly motivating to the band, they returned home after two days.

Months went by without any scheduled concerts due to the album's poor sales. Following another relapse and a stint in rehab, Kiedis and the rest of the band prepared for a summer tour, their first in almost seven months. Before the tour began, Kiedis had a motorcycle accident and was rushed to the hospital after severely injuring his hand. Due to his drug addiction, it took seven doses of morphine before the pain was assuaged. Following discharge from the hospital, he was forced to wear a full-arm cast for several months, resulting in the cancellation of all remaining scheduled concerts. Halfway through Kiedis's recovery, the band was asked to play the Fuji Rock Festival in July 1997. By that time, Kiedis's cast had receded down to the elbow and he felt well enough to play. A large typhoon had been forecast to hit the festival several hours before the show. The concert took place anyway, and when the Chili Peppers got on stage to play, the audience was being soaked in torrential rains, and the band found it virtually impossible to play their instruments. After eight songs, the lighting and sound equipment was torn from the stage and the band was obliged to an impromptu finish.

== Follow-up album and Navarro's departure ==
Returning home, the Chili Peppers parted ways and, while Flea and Navarro toured on late 1997 with the vaunted Jane's Addiction "relapse", for the most part, RHCP remained secluded from each other through the rest of 1997. No new material was written during that time, and it was not until the beginning of 1998 that the band began rehearsal. At that point, Navarro had become dependent on drugs, with Kiedis also struggling to remain clean. The band decided they would have a talk with Navarro and attempt to convince him to enter rehab. The discussion escalated into a heated dispute. In April 2010, Navarro discussed this incident, stating that: "One was my drug use at the time. The other was musical differences. Anthony says it was because I tripped and fell over an amp while on drugs. I say that he was on more drugs than me at that point. We both had a loose relationship with reality. Who do you want to believe?"

The band made an attempt to begin writing for a follow-up and had written and began recording a song titled "Circle of the Noose", but it was never completed. The song, the last to feature guitar work from Navarro, was a tribute to the late qawwali-devotional singer Nusrat Fateh Ali Khan. Navarro described the song as pop and dirge-like, and said it was one of his favorite songs he created with the band. He said: "The best way I can describe it is it's like pepped-up '60s folk with '90s ideals, but I'd hate to label it as folk because it's not, it moves." According to Flea, it contained a sample of Nusrat Fateh Ali Khan. On February 3, 2016, a rough mix of "Circle of the Noose," recorded on March 16, 1998, was leaked to the internet.

At this point in 1998, Kiedis and Flea decided it was time to fire their guitarist. Navarro was furious when confronted by Kiedis and Flea, but eventually accepted his termination. The Peppers were fighting, and on the verge of breaking up. Flea was beginning to question the band's future and thought it may be necessary to break the band up. He made one last attempt to keep the band together, asking Frusciante to rejoin. Frusciante had recently completed a drug rehabilitation program after more than five years of heroin addiction, and gladly accepted the invitation.

== Live performances ==
During the tour for One Hot Minute, all songs from the album except "Tearjerker" and "Falling Into Grace" were played. "One Hot Minute" was performed just one time with "Shallow Be Thy Game" performed just four times. Only "Pea" and "Aeroplane" have been performed since the tour ended in 1997 with "Pea" being performed on every tour making it now the most performed song from One Hot Minute with over 150 performances as of 2025.

Nothing from the album has ever been performed with John Frusciante with the exception of "Pea". In 2002, Frusciante said that he has never listened to the album, stating that "hearing it would be like seeing your girlfriend with another guy".

Chad Smith was asked by fans during a February 2014 online interview about the band's reasons for not performing the songs, and he responded by saying "We don't really feel that connected to that record anymore. No special reason, not to say we'd never play those songs, but we don't feel that emotionally connected to that music right now."

In 2016, "Aeroplane" was performed for the first time since 1997, at the request of then-guitarist Josh Klinghoffer. The song was played often from 2016 up until Klinghoffer's final shows with the band in 2019, being retired once again upon Frusciante's second return. The band teased "My Friends," "Let's Make Evil" and "Walkabout" during the I'm With You World Tour, and "Deep Kick" was teased during The Getaway World Tour.

On October 2, 2021, Smith and Navarro performed "My Friends" together for the first time in 25 years at the Ohana Festival. They were joined by Taylor Hawkins on vocals, Pat Smear on guitar and Chris Chaney on bass.

== Track listing ==
All tracks are written by Red Hot Chili Peppers (Flea, Kiedis, Navarro, Smith).

One Hot Minute track listing
No.	Title	Length
1.	"Warped"	5:04
2.	"Aeroplane"	4:44
3.	"Deep Kick"	6:34
4.	"My Friends"	4:03
5.	"Coffee Shop"	3:08
6.	"Pea"	1:46
7.	"One Big Mob"	6:01
8.	"Walkabout"	5:07
9.	"Tearjerker"	4:19
10.	"One Hot Minute"	6:25
11.	"Falling into Grace"	3:47
12.	"Shallow Be Thy Game"	4:33
13.	"Transcending"	5:43
Total length:		61:14

Japanese edition bonus track
No.	Title	Length
14.	"Melancholy Mechanics"	4:28

2006 iTunes bonus tracks
No.	Title	Length
14.	"Let's Make Evil"	5:17
15.	"Stretch You Out"	6:18
16.	"Bob"	5:43

== Personnel ==
Red Hot Chili Peppers

- Anthony Kiedis – lead vocals
- Flea – bass guitar, backing vocals, lead vocals on "Pea" and co-lead vocals on "Deep Kick"
- Dave Navarro – guitars, backing vocals
- Chad Smith – drums, percussion

Additional musicians

- Lenny Castro – percussion on "Walkabout", "My Friends", "One Hot Minute", "Deep Kick", and "Tearjerker"
- John Lurie – harmonica on "One Hot Minute"
- Keith "Tree" Barry – violin on "Tearjerker"
- Stephen Perkins – percussion on "One Big Mob", "Warped" and "Bob" (iTunes bonus track)
- Jimmy Boyle – backing vocals on "One Big Mob"
- Louis Mathieu – backing vocals on "One Big Mob"
- Aimee Echo – backing vocals on "One Hot Minute", "One Big Mob"
- Gurmukh Kaur Khalsa – chants on "Falling into Grace"
- Kristen Vigard – backing vocals on "Falling into Grace"
- Gabriel James Navarro – crying on "One Big Mob"
- The Aeroplane Kids (Clara Balzary, Bailey Reise, Askia Ndegéocello, Nadia Wehbe, Sarabeth Kelly, Matthew Kelly, Phillip Greenspan, Perry Greenspan, Veronica Twigg, Remy Greeno, Jaclyn DiMaggio, Hayley Oakes, Nikolai Giefer, Taiana Giefer, Nina Rothburg, Sheera Ehrig, Jade Chacon) – backing vocals on "Aeroplane"

Production

- Rick Rubin – producer
- Dave Sardy – recording, mixing
- Dave Schiffman – additional engineering
- Stephen Marcussen – mastering
- Don C. Tyler – digital editor

Design

- Mark Ryden – album artwork
- Sweetbryar Ludwig – calligraphy
- Anthony Kiedis – art direction
- Flea – art direction
- Dirk Walter – art direction

== Charts ==
=== Weekly charts ===
Weekly chart performance for One Hot Minute
Chart (1995–2001)	Peak position
Australian Albums (ARIA)	1
Austrian Albums (Ö3 Austria)	4
Belgian Albums (Ultratop Flanders)	5
Belgian Albums (Ultratop Wallonia)	3
Canada Top Albums/CDs (RPM)	6
Danish Albums (IFPI)	1
Dutch Albums (Album Top 100)	5
Estonia Top CD Albums (Eesti Top 10)	6
European Albums (Music & Media)	1
Finnish Albums (Suomen virallinen lista)	1
French Albums (SNEP)	3
German Albums (Offizielle Top 100)	3
Hungarian Albums (MAHASZ)	39
Irish Albums (IRMA)	7
Italian Albums (FIMI)	8
New Zealand Albums (RMNZ)	1
Norwegian Albums (VG-lista)	2
Scottish Albums (Official Charts)	7
Spanish Albums (AFYVE)	20
Swedish Albums (Sverigetopplistan)	1
Swiss Albums (Schweizer Hitparade)	2
UK Albums (Official Charts)	2
UK Rock & Metal Albums (Official Charts)	1
US Billboard 200	4

=== Year-end charts ===
1995 year-end chart performance for One Hot Minute
Chart (1995)	Position
Australian Albums (ARIA)	25
Belgian Albums (Ultratop Flanders)	78
Belgian Albums (Ultratop Wallonia)	44
Canada Top Albums/CDs (RPM)	69
Dutch Albums (Album Top 100)	94
European Top 100 Albums (Music & Media)	34
French Albums (SNEP)	27
German Albums (Offizielle Top 100)	60
New Zealand Albums (RMNZ)	37
Swiss Albums (Schweizer Hitparade)	33
US Billboard 200	109

1996 year-end chart performance for One Hot Minute
Chart (1996)	Position
Australian Albums (ARIA)	34
US Billboard 200	64

== Certifications ==
Certifications for One Hot Minute
Region	Certification	Certified units/sales
Argentina (CAPIF)	Gold	30,000^{^}
Australia (ARIA)	3× Platinum	210,000^{^}
Austria (IFPI Austria)	Gold	25,000^{*}
Belgium (BRMA)	Gold	25,000^{*}
Canada (Music Canada)	Platinum	100,000^{^}
France (SNEP)	Platinum	300,000^{*}
Japan (RIAJ)	Platinum	200,000^{^}
Netherlands (NVPI)	Gold	50,000^{^}
New Zealand (RMNZ)	Platinum	15,000^{^}
Spain (Promusicae)	Gold	50,000^{^}
Switzerland (IFPI Switzerland)	Gold	25,000^{^}
United Kingdom (BPI)	Gold	100,000^{^}
United States (RIAA)	2× Platinum	2,000,000^{^}
Summaries
Europe (IFPI)	Platinum	1,000,000^{*}
^{*} Sales figures based on certification alone.^{^} Shipments figures based on certification alone.
