= Suck My Kiss =

Song by Red Hot Chili Peppers

Single by Red Hot Chili Peppers

from the album Blood Sugar Sex Magik
- B-side: "Search and Destroy"; "Fela's Cock"
- Released: May 1992
- Genre: Funk rock; funk metal
- Length: 3:36
- Label: Warner Bros.
- Songwriters: Flea; John Frusciante; Anthony Kiedis; Chad Smith
- Producer: Rick Rubin

Red Hot Chili Peppers singles chronology
"Under the Bridge" (1992)	"Suck My Kiss" (1992)	"Breaking the Girl" (1992)

Music video
- "Suck My Kiss" on YouTube

"Suck My Kiss" is a song by American rock band Red Hot Chili Peppers. It was released as the third single from their fifth studio album, Blood Sugar Sex Magik. "Suck My Kiss" was released as an airplay single in the United States in 1991 and as a physical single in Australia and New Zealand the following year, reaching the top 10 in the two latter countries and peaking at number 15 on the US Billboard Modern Rock Tracks chart.

A music video, released on May 1, 1992, was made for the song using footage from the Funky Monks documentary directed by Gavin Bowden. It also featured shots in shades of red of the American army returning from the Gulf War, revealed by Anthony Kiedis on the audio commentary in the band Greatest Videos compilation. The song was included on the band's Greatest Hits compilation.

== Reception ==
In 2021, Kerrang ranked the song number seven on their list of the 20 greatest Red Hot Chili Peppers songs, and in 2022, Rolling Stone ranked the song number 11 on their list of the 40 greatest Red Hot Chili Peppers songs.

== Track listing ==
Australian CD and cassette single

1. "Suck My Kiss"
2. "Search and Destroy"
3. "Fela's Cock"

== Personnel ==
Red Hot Chili Peppers

- Anthony Kiedis – vocals
- Flea – bass
- John Frusciante – guitar
- Chad Smith – drums

Additional musicians

- Brendan O'Brien – Hammond B3 organ

== Charts ==
=== Weekly charts ===
Chart (1992)	Peak position
Australia (ARIA)	8
New Zealand (Recorded Music NZ)	3
US Alternative Airplay (Billboard)	15

=== Year-end charts ===
Chart (1992)	Position
Australia (ARIA)	60
New Zealand (RIANZ)	18

== Certifications ==
Region	Certification	Certified units/sales
United States (RIAA)	Gold	500,000^{‡}
^{‡} Sales+streaming figures based on certification alone.

== In media and popular culture ==
The song was voted number five in a Rolling Stone readers' poll on Red Hot Chili Peppers songs.

The song appears in episodes of Beavis and Butt-head and Hindsight, as well as the video games Guitar Hero III: Legends of Rock and 2014 video game NBA 2K15 "Yakkem Trailer" and the latter's soundtrack album. Along with the rest of the Blood Sugar Sex Magik album, the song was formerly a downloadable track in the Rock Band series. A remixed instrumental based on the song is often used as royalty free production music.

A line was used in the Japanese TV show Tamori Club, in a segment called "Soramimi Hour", in which non-Japanese songs are interpreted into Japanese, according to phonetics. The line "Should have been, could have been, would have been..." from the first verse was interpreted as 白便 黒便 和田勉 (Shiro ben, kuro ben, Wada Ben'), which translates to: "White excrement, black excrement, Ben Wada").

The song was covered by Richard Cheese and Lounge Against the Machine on his 2000 album, Lounge Against the Machine.
