= Warped (song) =

1995 single by Red Hot Chili Peppers

Single by Red Hot Chili Peppers

from the album One Hot Minute
- B-side: "Melancholy Mechanics"
- Released: August 21, 1995
- Genre: Funk metal; hard rock
- Length: 5:04 (album version); 4:19 (edit)
- Label: Warner Bros.
- Songwriters: Anthony Kiedis; Flea; Dave Navarro; Chad Smith
- Producer: Rick Rubin

Red Hot Chili Peppers singles chronology
"Soul to Squeeze" (1993)	"Warped" (1995)	"My Friends" (1995)

Music video
- "Warped" on YouTube

"Warped" is a song by American alternative rock band Red Hot Chili Peppers from their sixth studio album, One Hot Minute (1995). It was released as the first single from the album in August 1995 by Warner Bros. Records. It is the first track on One Hot Minute, beginning with an unusually quiet intro, before suddenly kicking into a very heavy, crunching riff, and ends with a mellow, melodic outro. Anthony Kiedis' vocals are distorted and echoed throughout, and contrast dramatically with the rapping present on the band's previous material, especially on their more fast-paced songs such as this; short lines are stretched to fill an entire measure. The musical style is of an unpredictable and unsettling nature, which is generally maintained throughout the entire album. The lyrics describe Kiedis' confused feelings about drugs, starting already in the first lines with: "my tendency/for dependency/is offending me".

Despite being the album's first single, neither the song nor the accompanying video was included on the Red Hot Chili Peppers' Greatest Hits compilation. The B-side "Melancholy Mechanics" also appears on the soundtrack to the 1996 movie Twister as well as on the Japanese pressing of One Hot Minute.

== Critical reception ==
Pan-European magazine Music & Media described 'Warped' as "powerful" and "a smart move as leadoff single". The reviewer added, "Watch out Rage Against the Machine and Dog Eat Dog, as the inventors of the funk-rap-metal crossover are no longer recluses. Loud and proud they reclaim their position as leaders." Rupert Howe of NME wrote that, despite being produced by "ex-Def Jam giant" Rick Rubin, "Warped" is "merely woeful frat-boy funk punk which repeatedly flexes its hard rock biceps in a vain effort to disguise the complete absence of any kind of song whatsoever." Music Week deemed it a "disappointing return" for the band, writing: "This edifice of prog is reluctant to surrender any hidden charms, preferring to make its mark with a profusion of funk-free psychedelic flourishes." The Guardian criticized the song and noted that the Chili Peppers "have take the effects-washed psychedelic (tie-dyed, if you will) vocals from one song and mounted them onto the pec-workin' – wait for it – funk-rock backing track from another."

Chart watcher James Masterton of Dotmusic believed the song was unlikely to build on the Chili Peppers' growing British success, as it is "a typical manic funk workout yet somehow not one that is likely to appeal to radio programmers or record buyers over here."

== Music video ==
While piecing together the final components of the album, the band recorded a video for "Warped", which was released on August 9, 1995. They asked Flea's brother-in-law, Gavin Bowden, to direct it. The video featured members of the band scantily clad and posing in rather sexual manners and it involved Kiedis and Navarro kissing towards the end as a way of breaking the monotony of cumbersome video recording. Thinking nothing of it, they continued to shoot and finished several days later. Warner Bros., however, saw the video and instantly wanted it thrown away, considering it to be unmarketable and that the kiss and homoerotic imagery would alienate a large portion of the band's fan base. The band came to a consensus to let the kiss remain on the final cut, prompting a backlash from the more conservative segments of their audience, who took offense at the action. Kiedis said of the situation: "If they couldn't accept what we were doing, we didn't need them anymore."

== Live performances ==
"Warped" made its live debut on May 31, 1994, at a surprise show in Los Angeles which was over a year before the song and album were released. Another notable performance of the song was during their co-headlining set at Woodstock 1994 however this and other earlier live versions featured slightly different lyrics as the song had yet to be completed in the studio. The band would also perform the song at the 1995 MTV Video Music Awards. "Warped" became one of the band's most performed songs from One Hot Minute during the One Hot Minute tour however like a majority of the songs from that album, it hasn't been performed live since that tour with its last performance coming on July 9, 1996, in France.

During live performances of "Warped", the band sometimes played a sample of the song "Three Days" by Jane's Addiction (former band of then-guitarist Dave Navarro) at the end of the song.

== Track listing ==
- CD single (1995)
1. "Warped" (edit)
2. "Pea" (album)
3. "Melancholy Mechanics" (previously unreleased)

== Personnel ==
Red Hot Chili Peppers

- Anthony Kiedis – vocals
- Dave Navarro – guitar
- Flea – bass
- Chad Smith – drums

Additional musicians

- Stephen Perkins – percussion

== Charts ==
Weekly chart performance for "Warped"
Chart (1995)	Peak position
Australia (ARIA)	12
Canada Rock/Alternative (RPM)	3
Europe (Eurochart Hot 100)	27
Finland (Suomen virallinen lista)	3
Germany (GfK)	47
Netherlands (Single Top 100 Tipparade)	14
New Zealand (Recorded Music NZ)	4
Norway (VG-lista)	12
Scottish Singles Sales (Official Charts)	29
Sweden (Sverigetopplistan)	24
Switzerland (Schweizer Hitparade)	33
UK Singles (Official Charts)	31
US Radio Songs (Billboard)	41
US Alternative Airplay (Billboard)	7
US Mainstream Rock (Billboard)	13

== Release history ==
Release dates and formats for "Warped"
Region	Version	Date	Format(s)	Label(s)	Ref.
United States	"Warped"	August 14, 1995	Alternative radio	Warner Bros.	
United Kingdom	"Warped"	August 21, 1995	CD; cassette	Warner Bros.	
Japan	"Warped" / "My Friends"	October 10, 1995	CD	Warner Bros.	
