= Blood Sugar Sex Magik =

Studio album by Red Hot Chili Peppers
- Released: September 24, 1991
- Recorded: April – June 1991
- Studio: The Mansion (Los Angeles)
- Genres: Funk rock; alternative rock; funk metal; rap rock
- Length: 73:56
- Label: Warner Bros.
- Producer: Rick Rubin

Red Hot Chili Peppers chronology
Mother's Milk (1989)	Blood Sugar Sex Magik (1991)	What Hits!? (1992)

Singles from Blood Sugar Sex Magik
- 1. "Give It Away" Released: September 1991; 2. "Under the Bridge" Released: February 1992; 3. "Suck My Kiss" Released: May 1992 (Aus / EU); 4. "Breaking the Girl" Released: August 1992; 5. "If You Have to Ask" Released: February 1993 (Aus / EU)

Blood Sugar Sex Magik is the fifth album by the American rock band Red Hot Chili Peppers, released on September 24, 1991, by Warner Bros. Records. Produced by Rick Rubin, its musical style differed notably from the band's previous album Mother's Milk (1989), reducing the use of heavy metal guitar riffs and accentuating the melodic songwriting contributions of guitarist John Frusciante. The album's subject matter continues to incorporate the sexual innuendos and references to drugs and death that fascinate lead singer Anthony Kiedis, as well as themes of lust and exuberance.

Blood Sugar Sex Magik peaked at number three on the US Billboard 200, and produced hit singles "Under the Bridge", "Give It Away", "Suck My Kiss", "Breaking the Girl" and "If You Have to Ask". The album received widespread critical acclaim and propelled the band into worldwide popularity. Heavily uncomfortable with fame, Frusciante quit the band during its 1992 tour; he rejoined in 1998.

Blood Sugar Sex Magik is widely recognized as an influential and seminal release of the alternative rock explosion of the 1990s, and it has been named by publications as one of the greatest albums of all time, with Steve Huey of AllMusic calling it "probably the best album the Chili Peppers will ever make." Flea shared the same sentiment in 2023, calling it his favorite Red Hot Chili Peppers album. The album has sold over 14 million units making it the band's second best-selling album behind Californication.

== Background ==
The band's previous album, 1989's Mother's Milk, was the band's second album to enter the Billboard 200, peaking at number 52, at the time the biggest of their career. Although the album was somewhat successful, the band felt unsatisfied with producer Michael Beinhorn. He convinced Frusciante to play with a heavier guitar tone, and instructed Anthony Kiedis to write lyrics that would be more radio-friendly, causing the band to feel restricted creatively.

As the band's contract with EMI came to an end, they began looking for a new record label. The group reached a consensus to go with Epic, with the proviso that they buy out their last album from EMI. Though the label promised it would take only a few days, the process stretched out into several months. Although a deal had been made with Epic, Mo Ostin of Warner Bros. Records called Kiedis to congratulate him on the successful deal, and complimented the rival record label. Kiedis recalled of the situation: "The coolest, most real person we had met during all these negotiations had just personally called to encourage me to make a great record for a rival company. That was the kind of guy I'd want to be working for." The group pursued the idea, and eventually dropped the contract with Epic in favor of a deal with Warner Bros. Ostin called an old friend at EMI, who immediately allowed for the label transfer.

== Recording and production ==
Now settled into Warner Bros. Records, the Chili Peppers began looking for a suitable producer. One in particular, Rick Rubin, stood out, as he was more broadminded than people the band had worked with in the past, even though Rubin had turned down the chance to produce their 1987 album The Uplift Mofo Party Plan due to the drug problems of Kiedis and guitarist Hillel Slovak (who died of a heroin overdose a year later). Unlike the Peppers' previous producers, Rubin was someone the band felt confident in to ask for guidance and input during times of difficulty. He would often help arrange drum beats, guitar melodies and lyrics.

The band sought to record the album in an unconventional setting, believing it would enhance their creative output. Rubin suggested the mansion magician Harry Houdini allegedly once lived in, to which they agreed. A crew was hired to set up a recording studio and other equipment required for production in the house in Los Angeles. The Peppers decided they would remain inside the mansion for the duration of recording, though according to Kiedis, Smith was convinced the location was haunted, and refused to stay. He would, instead, come each day by motorcycle. Smith himself disputes this account, and instead claims the real reason he did not stay at The Mansion was because he wanted to be with his wife. Frusciante, however, disagreed with Smith, and said "There are definitely ghosts in the house," but he felt they were "very friendly. We [the band] have nothing but warm vibes and happiness everywhere we go in this house."

Frusciante, Kiedis and Flea each had their own rooms in the house. When not recording with the band, Frusciante would spend his time painting, listening to music, reading and recording songs he'd written. Due to the seclusion, Kiedis ended up recording all his vocals in his room, as it was large enough to accommodate the recording equipment. For more than 30 days, the Chili Peppers worked inside the house; Kiedis felt it was an accommodating and resourceful environment which allowed him to complete the rest of the lyrics. During production, the band agreed to let Flea's brother-in-law document the creative process on film. When the album's recording was complete, the Chili Peppers released the film, titled Funky Monks.

== Music ==
Blood Sugar Sex Magik was written at a more rapid pace than the band's previous album. Before the Chili Peppers relocated into the mansion, Frusciante and Kiedis collaborated at each other's homes, in order to arrange song structures and guitar riffs. Then they presented ideas to Flea and Smith; as a whole, they decided on what they would use for the bass, guitar, vocal and percussion ensembles.

Kiedis focused lyrically on sexual references and innuendos, as they were frequently on his mind. Songs such as "Suck My Kiss", "If You Have to Ask", "Sir Psycho Sexy", "Give It Away" and "Blood Sugar Sex Magik" all contained sexual links, with lyrics like "A state of sexual light / Kissing her virginity / My affinity" and "Glorious euphoria / Is my must / Erotic shock / Is a function of lust." The concept behind "The Greeting Song" was a request Rubin had made. Rubin asked Kiedis to write a song solely about girls and cars. Although Kiedis disliked the concept, he wrote the song as Rubin requested and ended up disliking almost every one of the lyrics' aspects. Kiedis also began writing songs about anguish, and the self-mutilating thoughts he experienced thanks to his addiction to both heroin and cocaine; he believed his life had come to its lowest point under a bridge in downtown Los Angeles. Over a month later, Rubin stumbled upon a poem that eventually became the lyrics to "Under the Bridge." Also, he suggested Kiedis show it to the other band members. However, Kiedis was apprehensive because he thought the lyrics were "too soft" and different from the band's style. After singing the verse to Frusciante and Smith, the band started working on the song's structure the next day. Both Rubin and Kiedis worked several hours on arranging the song's chords and melodies until they both accepted it as complete. Frusciante ultimately chose the chords he played in the intro so it could balance out the song's depressing atmosphere: "my brain interpreted it as being a really sad song so I thought if the lyrics are really sad like that I should write some chords that are happier." "Naked in the Rain" was among the first songs that the band wrote for the album. The Red Hot Chili Peppers even played it once at the end of the Mother's Milk Tour in 1990, while the intros for "The Greeting Song" and "Sir Psycho Sexy" were also teased during the end of that tour; however, neither song was completed or had lyrics.

Blood Sugar Sex Magik integrated the band's typical punk and funk style, but moved away from that with more melodically driven songs. Tracks like "The Righteous and the Wicked", "Suck My Kiss", "Blood Sugar Sex Magik", "Give It Away" and "Funky Monks" still incorporated the use of heavy metal guitar riffs, but they differed from Mother's Milk since they contained less distortion. Flea reduced his use of the slapping technique emphasized on earlier albums, instead favoring more traditional and melodic bass lines. He even adopted a minimalist, "less is more" philosophy, saying, "I was trying to play simply on Blood Sugar Sex Magik because I'd been playing too much prior to that, so I thought, 'I've really got to chill out and play half as many notes'. When you play less, it's more exciting—there's more room for everything. If I do play something busy, it stands out, instead of the bass being a constant onslaught of notes. Space is good." Kiedis thought that the album had expanded the Red Hot Chili Peppers' musical horizons and served as a departure from their previous material. One of Blood Sugar Sex Magik's more melodic tracks, "Breaking the Girl", was written about Kiedis' constantly shifting relationships. He feared that he was following in his father's footsteps and simply becoming a womanizer, rather than establishing stable and long-term relationships: "As exciting and temporarily fulfilling as this constant influx of interesting and beautiful girls can be, at the end of the day, that shit is lonely and you're left with nothing." The track also featured a bridge in the middle, consisting of percussion instruments salvaged from a garbage dump.

Although jams had always served as an integral aspect of song creation for the Chili Peppers, Blood Sugar Sex Magik saw songs containing more structure. One specific jam caused the breakout song on the album: Frusciante, Flea, and Smith were all playing together—with Kiedis at another part of the room watching—when "Flea started playing this insane bass line, and Chad cracked up and played along ... I always had fragments of song ideas or even specific isolated phrases in my mind. I (Kiedis) took the mic and belted out 'Give it away, give it away, give it away, give it away now." The philosophy behind the lyrics came from a conversation that Kiedis had with Nina Hagen, regarding selflessness and how insignificant material possessions were in his life. This was the inspiration to the song "Give It Away". He also reminisced about late Chili Peppers guitarist Hillel Slovak, composing "My Lovely Man" in his memory. Kiedis wrote "Sir Psycho Sexy" as an over-zealous and exaggerated version of himself; a figure that could get any woman, and do anything he pleased to them. "The Power of Equality" confronted topics concerning racial equality, prejudice, and sexism. Kiedis wrote "I Could Have Lied" to document the brief relationship he had with Irish singer Sinéad O'Connor.

== Outtakes ==
Around 25 songs were written and recorded during the Blood Sugar Sex Magik sessions, with 17 of those making the album's final cut. The album's singles contained four outtakes from the album sessions as B-sides. Among those were the instrumental "Fela's Cock", a cover of The Stooges' "Search and Destroy" and "Sikamikanico" (which would also appear on the Wayne's World soundtrack in 1992). On Oct. 3, 2019, "Sikamikanico" was performed for the first time ever at the request of guitarist Josh Klinghoffer for his 40th birthday. The most notable outtake was "Soul to Squeeze", a song that would eventually become a hit single in 1993 when it was released on the Coneheads soundtrack and was also included on the band's 2003 Greatest Hits album.

"Little Miss Lover" and "Castles Made of Sand" (a song the band had been performing live for a few years), two Jimi Hendrix cover songs, would eventually be released in 2006 as iTunes bonus tracks. An unknown song appeared in the VH1 Blood Sugar Sex Magik documentary, Ultimate Albums. A rough mix of the album surfaced on the Internet and contains some alternate versions of the songs recorded during the album's sessions.

== Packaging ==
=== Artwork ===
Featured in the album cover booklet is a photographic collage of various tattoos the band members have.

All photography, paintings and art direction for Blood Sugar Sex Magik were credited to filmmaker Gus Van Sant, with the exception of the "tongue illustration", which, according to the album booklet, is credited to Hanky Panky (Henk Schiffmacher). The cover of the album features the four band members' faces positioned around a rose, with thorny vines in black and white coming out of their open mouths and converging on the rose. The lyrics are printed in white lettering across a black background, hand written by Kiedis. The booklet also contains a collage of photos assembled to showcase the band members' various tattoos, which feature faces of Native American tribal leaders, animals and sea creatures, as well as various symbols and phrases. Photographs of each band member alone, and two photographs of the band as a whole are also included.

Singles released to coincide with the album share little with Blood Sugar Sex Magik's artwork. The cover of "Give It Away" was a painting of a Chinese infant, surrounded by fish, vegetables, fruits and sushi; "Under the Bridge" is a photograph of a bridge in the city of Los Angeles; "Suck My Kiss" had a black and white photograph of the band, with Kiedis and Flea holding a large fish; "If You Have to Ask" is an illustration of an avocado next to a girl's large buttocks in a yellow bikini; and "Breaking the Girl" featured a painting of a human being covered in magma.

=== Dedication ===
Blood Sugar Sex Magik was dedicated to musician Mike Watt of the bands Minutemen and fIREHOSE, in thanks for his friendship and musical inspiration to the band.

== Promotion and release ==
Blood Sugar Sex Magik was released on September 24, 1991, the same day as Nirvana's breakthrough album Nevermind. It was certified gold on November 26, 1991, and certified platinum on April 1, 1992; since then it has gone seven times platinum in the United States. The album peaked at number 3 on the Billboard 200. Originally, "Give It Away" did not fare well in the mainstream; one of Warner Bros.' target radio stations refused to air it, telling the band to "come back to us when you have a melody in your song". KROQ (of Los Angeles), however, began to play the single several times daily, and that, according to Kiedis, "was the beginning of the infusion of 'Give It Away' into mass consciousness." The single ultimately peaked at number 9 on the UK Top 40 and number 73 on the Billboard Hot 100. Blood Sugar Sex Magik has sold over 14 million copies worldwide.

Due to the success of "Give It Away", the band did not foresee "Under the Bridge" as being equally viable. Warner Bros. sent representatives to a Chili Peppers' concert in order to figure out what would ultimately be the next single. When Frusciante began playing "Under the Bridge", Kiedis missed his cue; the entire audience began singing the song, instead. Kiedis was initially "mortified that I'd fucked up in front of Warner's people ... I apologized for fucking up but they said 'Fucking up? Are you kidding me? When every single kid at the show sings a song, that's our next single.'" "Under the Bridge" was, therefore, selected as Blood Sugar Sex Magik's second single. By January 1992, "Under the Bridge" had exploded, peaking at number 2 on the Billboard Hot 100.

To promote the album in Europe, Kiedis and Frusciante both agreed they would make the trip. However, it proved difficult for Frusciante to adapt to life outside of the mansion, after being in near-seclusion for almost 30 days. Kiedis recalled of the situation: "He had such an outpouring of creativity while we were making that album that I think he really didn't know how to live life in tandem with that creativity." It was also during this period when Frusciante began to experiment with heroin, which further compromised his mental stability. The European promotional trek took its toll on Frusciante, and he decided to return home when he and Kiedis reached London.

== Critical reception ==
Professional ratings
Review scores
Source	Rating
AllMusic	5/5 stars
Entertainment Weekly	B−
Los Angeles Times	3/4 stars
Mojo	5/5 stars
NME	9/10
Pitchfork	7.1/10
Q	4/5 stars
Rolling Stone	4/5 stars
Select	4/5
Spin Alternative Record Guide	8/10

Blood Sugar Sex Magik received widespread acclaim from critics. Rolling Stone's Tom Moon credited Rick Rubin for the change in style; Rubin "[gave] the Chilis' dynamic". He went on to praise the overall sound, which "displayed a growing curiosity about studio texture and nuance". NME reviewer Steven Wells found that Rubin's "cold precision" was evident on what Wells deemed "a babbling, rambling 17-track bastard classic" featuring "a clinical but writhing state-of-the-art fusion of funk, rap and metal scrapings". Mark Jenkins of The Washington Post observed that the "undeniably funky" album was "a spare, bass-heavy outing that downplays the rock ingredients in the Peppers' recipe." Paste magazine wrote that Rubin shepherded "Peppers’ rough-edged funk sound into a controlled explosion of heavy metal, art rock, funk, and blues influences which helped mark a turning point for the decade’s alternative sound."

Steve Huey of AllMusic said the album was "The Red Hot Chili Peppers' best album ... John Frusciante's guitar is less overpoweringly noisy, leaving room for differing textures and clearer lines, while the band overall is more focused and less indulgent." He considered Blood Sugar to be "varying ... it expands the group's musical and emotional range." Guitar Player magazine credited Frusciante with the Chili Peppers' drastic change in style: "by blending acid-rock, soul-funk, early art-rock, and blues style with a raw, unprocessed Strat-and-Marshall tone, [Frusciante] hit on an explosive formula that has yet to be duplicated".

Devon Powers of PopMatters said that "in one funked-out, fucked up, diabolical swoop, Blood Sugar Sex Magik reconfigured my relationship to music, to myself, to my culture and identity, to my race and class". In an article published in The Tampa Tribune, editor Philip Booth praised the record as "an ambitious effort that amounts to a culmination and blossoming of the musical forces that have been brewing in the band's sound since Kiedis and Flea birthed the band in 1983". Robert Christgau gave it an honorable mention in his Village Voice consumer guide, naming "Give It Away" and "Breaking the Girl" as highlights while writing "they've grown up, they've learned to write, they've got a right to be sex mystiks."

Chicago Sun-Times critic Michael Corcoran was more reserved in his praise, deeming the record "great" only on occasion while finding the length of the album excessive. Blood Sugar Sex Magik is considered to be an influential album, throughout the nineties, by establishing itself as a fundamental foundation for alternative rock. It has also been referred to as "the cornerstone album of funk rock" by FasterLouder.

"Under the Bridge", which became a breakout song for the band, was considered to be a highlight of the album by several critics. AllMusic reviewed the song individually and called it a "poignant sentiment ... it is self evident among the simple guitar which cradles the introductory verse, and the sense of fragility that is only doubled by the still down-tempo choral crescendo", and ultimately "has become an integral part of the 1990s alterna-landscape, and remains one of the purest diamonds that sparkle amongst the rough-hewn and rich funk chasms that dominate the Peppers' own oeuvre." However, Entertainment Weekly criticized the seriousness that the Red Hot Chili Peppers explored as being "disapproving of the band's usual Red Hot antics", and "Under the Bridge" had "fancy-shmancy touches". The song ended up peaking at number 2 on the Billboard Hot 100 in April 1992.

"Give It Away" was also praised, though as "... a free-associative mixture of positive vibes, tributes to musical heroes, and free love", with Frusciante "adding the song's two most unpredictable change-ups: a sudden contrast to Kiedis' hyperactivity in the form of a languid solo pre-recorded and dubbed backwards over the rhythm track, and a hard-rocking riff which is not introduced until the song's outro".

Tracks such as "Sir Psycho Sexy", however, were criticized for being overly explicit. Devon Powters of PopMatters said that "Eight minutes of 'Sir Psycho Sexy' will turn RHCP's young listeners into quivering masses of hormonal jello. Oversexed lines sneak their way into 'Apache Rose Peacock'; 'Blood Sugar Sex Magik', simply, sounds like fucking. Even the purest virgin comes away from Blood Sugar Sex Magik with a degree of sexual maturity; even the slickest playa can learn a couple of new moves."

In contrast, "Suck My Kiss", according to Amy Hanson of AllMusic, "completely flew in the face of the established pecking order of alternative rock." With the song, the Chili Peppers "fully allied themselves with the very few genre-bending bands that were able to make a radical impact on the sonic landscape that was dominated, it seemed, from every minute angle by grunge."

=== Accolades ===
Accolades for Blood Sugar Sex Magik
Source	Country	Accolade	Year	Rank
Visions	Germany	"The Most Important Albums of the 90s"	1999	1
Pause & Play	United States	"The 90s Top 100 Essential Albums"	1999	N/A
Paste	United States	"The Best Albums of 1991"	2021	15
Rolling Stone	United States	The 500 Greatest Albums of All Time	2003	310
Rolling Stone	United States	The 500 Greatest Albums of All Time	2012	310
Rolling Stone	United States	The 500 Greatest Albums of All Time	2020	186
Rolling Stone	United States	The 100 Greatest Albums of the Nineties	2003	19
Spin	United States	"Top 90 Albums of the 90s"	1999	58
Q	United Kingdom	"90 Albums of the 90s"	1999	58
Guitarist Magazine	United Kingdom	"101 Essential Guitar Albums"	2000	N/A
Guitar World	United States	"The 100 Greatest Guitar Albums of All Time"	2006	18
My Favourite Album	Australia	"Australia's Favourite Albums of All Time"	2006	8
Rock and Roll Hall of Fame	United States	"The Definitive 200: Top 200 Albums of All-Time"	2007	88

== Tour and Frusciante's departure ==
Before the Blood Sugar Sex Magik Tour began, Kiedis saw the music video for the Smashing Pumpkins' "Rhinoceros" on MTV. He called their manager and asked the Smashing Pumpkins to join the tour. The Smashing Pumpkins agreed and several days later, former Chili Peppers drummer Jack Irons called and asked the band to allow his friend's new group, Pearl Jam, to open for them as well.

The first show following the release of Blood Sugar Sex Magik was at the Oscar Mayer Theater in Madison, Wisconsin, which was met with positive reactions from the Milwaukee Journal: "the audience was a swirling mass of airborne cups, ice cubes, shoes, shirts, pogo dancers, body-passers and stage divers. And it wasn't purely a boy's club in the moshpit—many females bought into the mayhem, stripping down to their bras and flinging themselves about madly as the band tore through 'Higher Ground', 'Suck My Kiss', and 'Give it Away', which was Goth-ed up by Frusciante when he added a riff from Black Sabbath's 'Sweet Leaf'."

Blood Sugar Sex Magik began receiving heavy radio play and massive sales in the middle of their U.S. tour. Frusciante, who wanted the Chili Peppers to remain in the underground music scene, entered a state of denial and depression. According to Kiedis, "He began to lose all of the manic, happy-go-lucky, fun aspects of his personality. Even onstage, there was a much more serious energy around him." Frusciante began to form grudges against his bandmates. He saw the band's newfound popularity as shameful.

Onstage tension began to grow between Kiedis and Frusciante. Kiedis recalled an argument after a show in New Orleans: "We had a sold-out house and John just stood in the corner, barely playing his guitar. We came offstage and John and I got into it." With the Peppers now playing shows at arenas rather than theaters, the promoters decided that Pearl Jam should be replaced with a more successful act. Kiedis contacted Nirvana drummer Dave Grohl, who accepted an offer for Nirvana to replace Pearl Jam. The Smashing Pumpkins' Billy Corgan, however, refused to play with Nirvana as he had once dated frontman Kurt Cobain's wife Courtney Love. The Pumpkins were, therefore, replaced with Pearl Jam. The upshot for the tour (albeit not by design) then, was the Smashing Pumpkins being replaced by Nirvana while Pearl Jam maintained their status quo.

Their first show with Nirvana was at the L.A Sports Arena. Kiedis described Nirvana's act as "raw energy; their musicality, their song selection, they were like a chain saw cutting through the night". When the Red Hot Chili Peppers finished touring with Nirvana, they traveled to Europe, where Frusciante, in need of someone to connect to, brought along his girlfriend Toni Oswald. Kiedis said that "John had broken our unwritten rule of no spouses or girlfriends on the road". Briefly interrupting the European tour, the Chili Peppers flew to New York City and performed on an episode of Saturday Night Live. They played "Under the Bridge" as the second song; a performance that Kiedis felt was sabotaged by Frusciante:

[Frusciante] was experimenting the way he would have if we'd been rehearsing the tune. Well we weren't. We were on live TV in front of millions of people and it was torture. I started singing in what I thought was the key he was playing in. I felt like I was getting stabbed in the back and hung out to dry in front of all of America while this guy was off in a corner in the shadow, playing some dissonant out-of-tune experiment.

The band took a two-week hiatus between the European and Japanese legs of the tour, which began in May 1992. Minutes before the Chili Peppers were scheduled to perform in Tokyo, Frusciante refused to go on stage, saying he had quit. After half an hour of coaxing, Frusciante agreed to play the show, though he said it would be his last. Kiedis recalled of the situation: "It was the most horrible show ever. Every single note, every single word, hurt, knowing that we were no longer a band. I kept looking over at John and seeing this dead statue of disdain ... And that night, John disappeared from the topsy-turvy world of the Red Hot Chili Peppers." The band hired guitarist Arik Marshall to complete the tour, which included Lollapolooza and several European and South American festivals. He was fired at the end of the tour.

== Live performances ==
To date, songs from the album remain the most performed out of any album from the band's catalog. "Give it Away" is the most performed song ever by the band with the song being performed over 1000 times since 1991. "Blood Sugar Sex Magik", "I Could Have Lied", "If You Have to Ask", "Sir Psycho Sexy", "Suck My Kiss" and "They're Red Hot" are also frequently performed. The only songs to never have been performed from the album in full are "Mellowship Slinky in B Major" and "The Righteous & the Wicked". "Apache Rose Peacock" has been partially performed 3 times while "The Greeting Song" has also been partially performed or teased a few times. "Funky Monks" was first performed in 1991 and not again until 2006 when they performed it twice. "Naked in the Rain" was one of the earliest songs from the album to be performed live. It was only performed on December 31, 1990, and once more in November 1991. Despite being one of the album's singles, "Breaking the Girl" has only been performed 22 times with its last performance coming in 2019 with guitarist Josh Klinghoffer; It was only performed a total of 10 times with John Frusciante. "My Lovely Man" was performed many times between 1991 and 2004.

== Legacy ==
Blood Sugar Sex Magik was placed atop many "Best Of" lists, especially those pertaining to the '90s. Spin magazine charted the album at number 58 on their "Top 90 Albums of the 90s", and Pause and Play ranked it number 11 on a similar list. In a 2021 article listing "The Best Albums of 1991" from the staff of Paste magazine, Blood Sugar Sex Magik ranked number 15 on the list. The record was also placed in Guitarist Magazine's "101 Essential Guitar Albums"; and included in the book 1001 Albums You Must Hear Before You Die.

In 2003, Rolling Stone ranked Blood Sugar Sex Magik number 310 on their list of the "500 Greatest Albums of All Time". It maintained the ranking in the 2012 revised list, then shot up to number 186 in the 2020 revised list.

== Track listing ==
All tracks are written by Anthony Kiedis, Flea, John Frusciante and Chad Smith, except where noted.

Blood Sugar Sex Magik track listing
No.	Title	Writer(s)	Length
1.	"The Power of Equality"		4:03
2.	"If You Have to Ask"		3:36
3.	"Breaking the Girl"		4:55
4.	"Funky Monks"		5:22
5.	"Suck My Kiss"		3:36
6.	"I Could Have Lied"		4:04
7.	"Mellowship Slinky in B Major"		3:59
8.	"The Righteous & the Wicked"		4:07
9.	"Give It Away"		4:42
10.	"Blood Sugar Sex Magik"		4:31
11.	"Under the Bridge"		4:24
12.	"Naked in the Rain"		4:25
13.	"Apache Rose Peacock"		4:41
14.	"The Greeting Song"		3:13
15.	"My Lovely Man"		4:39
16.	"Sir Psycho Sexy"		8:16
17.	"They're Red Hot"	Robert Johnson	1:09
Total length:			73:56

2006 iTunes Store bonus tracks
No.	Title	Writer(s)	Length
18.	"Little Miss Lover"	Jimi Hendrix	2:39
19.	"Castles Made of Sand"	Jimi Hendrix	3:19
Total length:			79:54

== Personnel ==
Credits adapted from AllMusic.

Red Hot Chili Peppers

- Anthony Kiedis – lead vocals, percussion on "Breaking the Girl"
- John Frusciante – guitars, backing vocals, percussion on "Breaking the Girl"
- Flea – bass, backing vocals, piano on "Mellowship Slinky in B Major", trumpet on "Apache Rose Peacock", percussion on "Breaking the Girl"
- Chad Smith – drums, tambourine on "Funky Monks", "Mellowship Slinky in B Major", "If You Have to Ask", "Sir Psycho Sexy" and "Give It Away", marimba on "Sir Psycho Sexy", percussion on "Breaking the Girl"

Additional musicians

- Brendan O'Brien – Mellotron on "Breaking the Girl" and "Sir Psycho Sexy", Hammond B-3 organ on "Suck My Kiss", "Under The Bridge" and "Give It Away", synthesizer on "If You Have to Ask", toy celeste on "Apache Rose Peacock" and "Mellowship Slinky in B Major"
- Gail Frusciante and her friends – choir vocals on "Under the Bridge"
- Pete Weiss – Jew's harp (credited as juice harp) on "Give It Away"

Production

- Rick Rubin – production
- Brendan O'Brien – engineering, mixing (with Rick Rubin)
- Chris Holmes – mixing
- Howie Weinberg – mastering

Design

- Gus Van Sant – art direction

== Charts ==
=== Weekly charts ===
Weekly chart performance for Blood Sugar Sex Magik
Chart (1991–2022)	Peak position
Australian Albums (ARIA)	1
Austrian Albums (Ö3 Austria)	17
Belgian Albums (Ultratop Flanders)	184
Belgian Albums (Ultratop Wallonia)	157
Canada Top Albums/CDs (RPM)	1
Dutch Albums (Album Top 100)	2
Finnish Albums (Suomen virallinen lista)	16
French Albums (SNEP)	76
German Albums (Offizielle Top 100)	12
Hungarian Albums (MAHASZ)	23
Italian Albums (FIMI)	25
New Zealand Albums (RMNZ)	1
Norwegian Albums (VG-lista)	5
Swedish Albums (Sverigetopplistan)	26
Swiss Albums (Schweizer Hitparade)	10
UK Albums	25
US Billboard 200	3
US Top Catalog Albums (Billboard)	19
US Indie Store Album Sales (Billboard)	21
US Vinyl Albums (Billboard)	6

=== Year-end charts ===
1992 year-end chart performance for Blood Sugar Sex Magik
Chart (1992)	Position
Australian Albums (ARIA)	5
Canadian Albums (RPM)	9
Dutch Albums (Album Top 100)	11
Eurochart Top 100 Albums (Music & Media)	34
German Albums (Offizielle Top 100)	21
New Zealand Albums (RMNZ)	3
Swiss Albums (Schweizer Hitparade)	24
US Billboard 200	14

1999 year-end chart performance for Blood Sugar Sex Magik
Chart (1999)	Position
UK Albums (OCC)	145

2002 year-end chart performance for Blood Sugar Sex Magik
Chart (2002)	Position
Canadian Alternative Albums (Nielsen SoundScan)	168
Canadian Metal Albums (Nielsen SoundScan)	86

== Certifications ==
Certifications for Blood Sugar Sex Magik
Region	Certification	Certified units/sales
Argentina (CAPIF)	Platinum	60,000^{^}
Australia (ARIA)	6× Platinum	420,000^{^}
Austria (IFPI Austria)	Gold	25,000^{*}
Canada (Music Canada)	4× Platinum	400,000^{^}
Denmark (IFPI Danmark)	3× Platinum	60,000^{‡}
France (SNEP)	Platinum	300,000^{*}
Germany (BVMI)	Platinum	500,000^{^}
Italy (FIMI) sales since 2009	Platinum	50,000^{‡}
Netherlands (NVPI)	Platinum	100,000^{^}
New Zealand (RMNZ)	3× Platinum	45,000^{‡}
Norway (IFPI Norway)	Platinum	50,000^{*}
Poland (ZPAV)	Gold	50,000^{*}
Spain (Promusicae)	2× Platinum	200,000^{^}
Sweden (GLF)	Platinum	100,000^{^}
United Kingdom (BPI)	3× Platinum	900,000^{^}
United States (RIAA)	7× Platinum	7,000,000^{^}
^{*} Sales figures based on certification alone.^{^} Shipments figures based on certification alone.^{‡} Sales+streaming figures based on certification alone.
