= Under the Bridge =

1992 single by Red Hot Chili Peppers

Single by Red Hot Chili Peppers

from the album Blood Sugar Sex Magik
- B-side: "Sikamikanico"; "Search and Destroy"; "Soul to Squeeze"; "Fela's Cock"
- Released: February 1992
- Recorded: 1991
- Studio: The Mansion (Los Angeles)
- Genre: Alternative rock
- Length: 4:24
- Label: Warner Bros.
- Songwriters: Anthony Kiedis; Flea; John Frusciante; Chad Smith
- Producer: Rick Rubin

Red Hot Chili Peppers singles chronology
"Give It Away" (1991)	"Under the Bridge" (1992)	"Suck My Kiss" (1992)

Music video
- "Under the Bridge" on YouTube

"Under the Bridge" is a song by the American rock band the Red Hot Chili Peppers and the eleventh track on their fifth studio album, Blood Sugar Sex Magik (1991). It was released in February 1992 by Warner Bros. Records. The singer, Anthony Kiedis, wrote the lyrics while reflecting on loneliness and the struggles of being clean from drugs, and almost did not share it with the band.

"Under the Bridge" was praised by critics and fans for its emotional weight. The song was a commercial success and the band's highest-charting single, peaking at number two on the Billboard Hot 100 and certified platinum. It was also a success in other countries, mostly charting within the top 10. Gus Van Sant directed the song's music video, which was filmed in Los Angeles.

"Under the Bridge" helped the Red Hot Chili Peppers enter the mainstream. David Fricke of Rolling Stone said that the song "unexpectedly drop-kicked the band into the Top 10". The song has become an inspiration to other artists, and remains a seminal component of the alternative rock movement of the early-to-mid 1990s. In 1998, the English girl group All Saints released a cover that topped the UK singles chart for two weeks.

== Writing ==
During the production of the Red Hot Chili Peppers's 1991 album Blood Sugar Sex Magik, producer Rick Rubin regularly visited singer Anthony Kiedis to review his new material. He found a poem titled "Under the Bridge" in Kiedis's notebook and took an interest in the poignant lyrics. Rubin suggested that Kiedis show it to the rest of the band: "I thought it was beautiful. I said, 'We've got to do this.'"

Kiedis was reluctant, as he felt the poem was too emotional and did not fit the Chili Peppers's style. After singing the poem to guitarist John Frusciante and drummer Chad Smith, they "got up and walked over to their instruments and started finding the beat and guitar chords to match it". Frusciante chose the chords to balance the dark lyrics, saying "I thought if the lyrics are really sad like that I should write some chords that are happier".

Frusciante and Kiedis worked on the song for several days. It was one of the few tracks completed prior to the band moving into the Mansion, where they recorded the album. After the song was recorded, Rubin felt the grand ending would benefit from a large group of singers. Frusciante invited his mother, Gail, and her friend, both of whom sang in a choir, to perform.

=== Lyrics ===
Kiedis wrote many of the lyrics during a period of depression. After struggling with heroin and cocaine addiction, he had been sober for roughly three years. He felt that this had distanced him from his bandmates, who continued to use cannabis together; Kiedis felt that Frusciante was "no longer in [his] world". Driving home after rehearsal in April 1991, Kiedis thought of his addiction during his relationship with his former girlfriend Ione Skye. He wrote in his 2004 memoir Scar Tissue: "The loneliness that I was feeling triggered memories of my time with Ione and how I'd had this beautiful angel of a girl who was willing to give me all of her love, and instead of embracing that, I was downtown with fucking gangsters shooting speedballs under a bridge."

Kiedis's alienation led him to feel that the city of Los Angeles was his only companion, and that "there was a nonhuman entity, maybe the spirit of the hills and the city, who had me in her sights and was looking after me".

One verse discusses the harsh effects of drugs, their role in destroying Kiedis's relationships, and their impact on his happiness. The verse recounts his experience entering gang territory under a bridge to purchase drugs; to gain access, Kiedis pretended that a sister of one of the gang members was his fiancée. Kiedis wrote that this was one of his lowest moments, as it demonstrated the level to which he was willing to sink for his addiction.

Kiedis has refused to reveal the location of the bridge, saying only that it is in downtown Los Angeles. Using details provided by Kiedis in his autobiography, writer Mark Haskell Smith concluded that the bridge was in MacArthur Park; however, this contradicts Kiedis's assertion that the bridge was under a freeway. Other possible locations include the Belmont Tunnel about half a mile from MacArthur Park, and the overpass where Interstate Highway 10 (the Santa Monica Freeway) crosses Hoover Street close to downtown L.A.

== Composition ==
"Under the Bridge"
Sample of "Under the Bridge" that contrasts the sparse, minimalist guitar ideology employed by Frusciante in the intro with the grand final verse sung by Kiedis and a choir in the outro

"Under the Bridge" is performed in 4/4 time in the key of E major. The intro changes between D and F♯ major chords before the first verse moves into E. The bridge and ending modulate to A minor. The song marked a shift in style for Kiedis, who had spent most of his career singing rapidly due to his limited range. The song begins with Frusciante playing a slow introduction he said drew from the 1967 Jimi Hendrix song "Little Wing".

As Kiedis begins to sing, the guitar playing becomes more rapid until it reaches an E major seventh chord that halts the song; the silence is broken by drummer Chad Smith's closed hi-hat and cross stick struck at a fast tempo. Frusciante borrowed the E major seventh chord technique from British guitarist Marc Bolan of the glam rock band T. Rex, who used it in the song "Rip Off" from the 1971 album Electric Warrior.

"Under the Bridge" continues with another verse and chorus, when the bass enters. After the next verse an E major seven chord again marks a break before the start of the chorus. The second chorus transitions into a different verse, where Smith begins to play the drums, and Kiedis sings "Take me all the way/Yeah/Yeah-e-yeah/Oh no, no." After Kiedis cues "One time," a choir sings "Under the bridge downtown" and Kiedis sings "Is where I drew some blood/I could not get enough/Forgot about my love/I gave my life away" in between. As the choir, Kiedis and drums stop, Frusciante and Flea play the ending.

== Release ==
The first single from Blood Sugar Sex Magik was "Give It Away", which reached number one on the Billboard Modern Rock Tracks chart on October 26, 1991. The band did not expect "Under the Bridge" to be as successful, but understood its commercial potential. Warner Bros. Records sent representatives to a Chili Peppers concert to determine which song should be the next single. When Frusciante began playing "Under the Bridge", Kiedis missed his cue and the audience began singing the song instead. Kiedis was initially "mortified that I had fucked up in front of Warner's people [...] I apologized for fucking up but they said 'Fucking up? Are you kidding me? When every single kid at the show sings a song, that's our next single'."

"Under the Bridge" was released in February 1992 in Australia and on March 2, 1992, in the United Kingdom. Journalist Jeff Apter noted that it "was the bona fide, across-all-formats radio hit that the band had been working towards for seven years". It spent 26 cumulative weeks on the United States Billboard Hot 100 chart. The single has been certified 6× platinum by the Recording Industry Association of America.

== Reception ==
Alan Jones from Music Week gave the song a score of four out of five and named it Pick of the Week in April 1994, writing that "it is the Peppers' most endearing and commercial track. A great radio record which deserves a second bite at the Top 20." Upon the 1991 release, Parry Gettelman from Orlando Sentinel described it as "an interesting Hendrix-Prince-Zep hybrid that has a lovely bass line (and none of Flea's increasingly predictable popping)." Nick Griffiths of Select dismissed it as "all mellow strumming and thoughtfully shallow vocals, though it's almost exonerated by a shrill unexpectedly choral middle eight". Reviewing the album, Ben DiPietro of the Richmond Times-Dispatch was impressed by the Chili Peppers' incorporation of slower tracks, especially "Under the Bridge". David Fricke of Rolling Stone said that it was a "stark and uncommonly pensive ballad" that "drop-kicked the band into the Top 10". Another Rolling Stone editor, Tom Moon, felt that the song "revealed new dimensions. The rhythm section displays a growing curiosity about studio texture and nuance."

Mark Frith from Smash Hits gave it five out of five, writing, "A classic. Far from being their usual in-yer-face energetic rap, "Under the Bridge" is a tender, thoughtful and quite sad tale of loneliness, the sort of thing that Pearl Jam would do if they forgot to ask their ten friends to play their guitars really loudly. Moody and brilliant." Philip Booth of The Tampa Tribune said it was "undulating [and] omnipresent" not only in alternative rock but pop music generally. According to Amy Hanson of AllMusic, it became "an integral part of the 1990s alterna-landscape, and remains one of the purest diamonds that sparkle amongst the rough-hewn and rich funk chasms that dominate the Peppers' own oeuvre". She praised "Under the Bridge" as a "poignant sentiment that is self evident among the simple guitar which cradles the introductory verse, and the sense of fragility that is only doubled by the still down-tempo choral crescendo".

== Live performances ==
"Under the Bridge"
Sample of a live version of "Under the Bridge" from the band's performance on June 25, 2004, in Hyde Park, London. In concert, guitarist John Frusciante provides the backing vocals of "Under the bridge downtown", replacing the choir that is used on the studio version of the song.

"Under the Bridge" is frequently performed in concert. Unlike several of the Chili Peppers' other songs, "Under the Bridge" is not interpreted in a different manner than what is on the record—aside from being played acoustically, the track is performed the same as it appears on Blood Sugar Sex Magik. Kiedis is, however, notorious for being incapable of achieving several high notes in live performances; he has noted that he sometimes forgets or rearranges song lyrics in the verses. After its release, the song would be included in virtually all concerts; Frusciante, however, began to resent the song's popularity and would play convoluted intros, purposefully throwing Kiedis off. An example of this was during a televised performance on the highly rated program Saturday Night Live on February 22, 1992. Kiedis said that it "felt like I was getting stabbed in the back and hung out to dry in front of all of America while [Frusciante] was off in a corner in the shadow, playing some dissonant out-of-tune experiment." Frusciante used a distortion pedal for the ending verse and screamed incomprehensibly into the microphone when providing backup vocals, neither of which were originally planned or typical of live performances.

At times Kiedis has also resented singing the song, especially during instances when he felt distanced from the song's lyrics. Recently, however, Kiedis has experienced a revival in interest: "Although there have been times when I was over ["Under the Bridge"], I've rediscovered it and now I feel close to it and it still has power, and life, and purpose as a song." Frusciante believed that the flexibility of "Under the Bridge" has contributed to its success: "A lot of the time that is one of the ingredients of a hit; you can hear it over and over and it will still always mean new things, but you do go through cycles." Flea believes that the reason "Under the Bridge" had a recent revival in relevancy was due to Frusciante's first return to the band from 1998 to 2009 after quitting in 1992. Flea believed that it was vital to have the four members who wrote the track together.

"Under the Bridge" was played at the 1999 Woodstock Festival, which the Red Hot Chili Peppers headlined; they were the final act to perform. Attempts at distributing candles that were to be lit during the song backfired when the crowd, which was already disorderly, instead created a bonfire. Lighthearted foul-play escalated into violence when several women who had been crowd surfing and moshing were raped and nearby property was looted and destroyed. Other notable performances were at Slane Castle in August 2003 to 80,000 attendees; and in 2004 at London's Hyde Park, in which, over the course of three days, an estimated 250,000 people were in attendance. Released as the band's first live album, the event became the highest-grossing concert at a single venue in history, with a total revenue of $17.1 million. "Under the Bridge" is also performed on the Chili Peppers' concert video Off the Map released in 2001, and on an exclusive performance for iTunes in 2006. During the band's 2006 Stadium Arcadium World Tour, the band for the first time decided to drop the song from some of the setlists in favor of "I Could Have Lied" or "Soul to Squeeze". This continued on the band's 2016–17 The Getaway World Tour and 2022-2023's Global Stadium Tour. Red Hot Chili Peppers performed the song on January 30, 2025 at Kia Forum in Inglewood, California for FireAid to help with relief efforts for the January 2025 Southern California wildfires.

== Legacy ==
"Under the Bridge" has been included in many publications' "Best of ..." lists. In 2002, Kerrang! placed the song at number six on their list of the "100 Greatest Singles of All Time". Q ranked the song number 180 on their compilation of the "1001 Best Songs, Ever". Life included "Under the Bridge" in the compilation "40 Years of Rock & Roll, 5 Songs Per Year 1952–1991", with the year being 1991. Pause and Play included the song in their unordered list of the "10 Songs of the 90's"; and the song ranked fifteenth in VH1's "100 Greatest Songs of the 90s". Rolling Stone and MTV compiled a list of the "100 Greatest Pop Songs Since The Beatles" in 2000, with "Under the Bridge" coming in fifty-fourth. "Under the Bridge" was also ranked No. 98 in the list of Rolling Stone "100 Greatest Guitar Songs of All Time" and ranked No. 328 on their "500 Greatest Songs of All Time". In 2021, Kerrang ranked the song number two on their list of the 20 greatest Red Hot Chili Peppers songs, and in 2022, Rolling Stone ranked the song number seven on their list of the 40 greatest Red Hot Chili Peppers songs.

"Under the Bridge" helped the Red Hot Chili Peppers enter the mainstream. David Fricke of Rolling Stone said that the song "unexpectedly drop-kicked the band into the Top 10", while Philip Booth of The Tampa Tribune commented that it was a "pretty, undulating, [and] by-now omnipresent single."

== Music video ==
External videos
- YouTube video
- Under The Bridge (Music Video)

Frusciante standing on a pedestal with inverted superimposed images behind him in the music video for "Under the Bridge"

The accompanying music video for "Under the Bridge" was directed by Gus Van Sant, who photographed the band during their stay at the Mansion and provided the art direction for Blood Sugar Sex Magik. Van Sant knew Flea due to his role in Van Sant's 1991 film My Own Private Idaho. The band members respected Van Sant, and were elated when he agreed to direct the video for "Under the Bridge". Flea credited the video as "the thing that really made us break through the mainstream of American and worldwide pop culture".

The video was shot on the streets of Los Angeles and in a studio soundstage. It begins with Frusciante standing alone on a pedestal wearing a red-and-white-striped collared shirt, brown khaki pants, black and white wingtip shoes, and a purple, green and multicolored chullo, with white stitched wolves. He plays a 1966 Fender Jaguar behind the backdrop of a desert and an inverted cloudy sky. His shadow is projected either side of him. Frusciante's then-girlfriend, Toni Oswald, selected his clothes that day. Frusciante remembered Van Sant's surprise: "When I got [to the studio] Gus Van Sant was just looking at me and going 'God, I'm so glad you wore that hat. I'm so glad you wore that shirt. Oh! Those pants are so great, I'm so glad you wore those.'" The video marked a shift in Frusciante's on-camera behavior; he no longer wished to jump around fervently as in the band's prior videos.

As Kiedis begins to sing, he appears on camera bathed in purple light with blue fluorescent stars as a backdrop, surrounded by clouds. As the camera pans closer, an image of the skyline of Van Sant's home city, Portland, is superimposed from his chin downwards. Flea and Chad Smith are placed into the image while playing. Van Sant made superimposing the theme of the video; the idea came from a project he worked on with novelist William S. Burroughs.

The scenes in the studio are coupled with scenes of Kiedis walking the streets of L.A., wearing a white T-shirt with the words "To Hell And Back"; as he walks, the camera focuses on various people. At various points, Kiedis stands before the Belmont Tunnel before its closure, which he felt was vital; he felt that the studio portion alone would not convey enough emotion: "The first time we shot [the video] it was all in a studio and that didn't seem to capture everything we needed to capture. It needed more; it needed to be combined with an outdoor, streets-of-Los-Angeles thing." Towards the end, Kiedis runs down the Los Angeles River channel shirtless and in slow motion. In the background is a pillar in a cloudy sky before crossfading into a nuclear explosion (the "Baker" shot of Operation Crossroads). The video ends with various superimposed images of the band, followed by Frusciante playing alone on a pedestal—this time with an inverted shot of the ocean as the sky.

MTV placed the "Under the Bridge" video on heavy rotation. At the 1992 MTV Video Music Awards, the Red Hot Chili Peppers led the nominations, which included the categories of "Best Video", "Best Group", and "Best Direction". "Under the Bridge" won the group "Breakthrough Video" and "Viewers Choice Best Video"; the band's video for "Give It Away" won "Best Art Direction". Chicago Tribune readers voted it the 8th best video of the year.

== Track listings ==
- US cassette single (1992)
1. "Under the Bridge" (album version) – 4:24
2. "The Righteous & the Wicked" (album version) – 4:05
- UK 7-inch single (1992)

A. "Under the Bridge" (LP version) – 4:34
B. "Give It Away" (single mix) – 4:46

- UK 12-inch single (1992)

A1. "Under the Bridge" (LP version) – 4:34
A2. "Search and Destroy" – 3:39
B1. "Soul to Squeeze" – 4:50
B2. "Sikamikanico" – 3:25

- German CD single (1992)
1. "Under the Bridge" (LP version) – 4:34
2. "Sikamikanico" – 3:25
3. "Give It Away" (12-inch mix) – 6:02
4. "Give It Away" (Rasta Mix) – 6:47
- European 7-inch single (1992)

A. "Under the Bridge" – 4:34
B. "Sikamikanico" – 3:25

- UK limited-edition CD single (1994)
1. "Under the Bridge" – 4:34
2. "Sikamikanico" – 3:25
3. "Suck My Kiss" (live) – 3:45
4. "Search and Destroy" – 3:39
- UK maxi-single (1994)
1. "Under the Bridge" – 4:24
2. "Fela's Cock" – 5:10
3. "I Could Have Lied" (live) – 4:33
4. "Give It Away" (in progress) – 4:37
- UK limited-edition 7-inch blue vinyl (1994)

A. "Under the Bridge" – 4:34
B. "Suck My Kiss" (live) – 3:45

== Personnel ==
Red Hot Chili Peppers

- Anthony Kiedis – vocals
- John Frusciante – guitar
- Flea – bass
- Chad Smith – drums

Additional musicians

- Gail Frusciante and her friends – choir vocals
- Brendan O'Brien – Hammond B-3 Organ

== Charts ==
=== Weekly charts ===
Weekly chart performance for "Under the Bridge"
Chart (1992–2012)	Peak position
Australia (ARIA)	1
Australia Alternative (ARIA)	1
Belgium (Ultratop 50 Flanders)	1
Belgium (VRT Top 30 Flanders)	1
Canada Top Singles (RPM)	3
Denmark (IFPI)	7
Europe (Eurochart Hot 100)	30
France (SNEP)	136
Germany (GfK)	11
Iceland (RÚV)	2
Ireland (IRMA)	20
Israel (Israeli Singles Chart)	2
Mexico International (Notitas Musicales)	1
Netherlands (Dutch Top 40)	1
Netherlands (Single Top 100)	1
New Zealand (Recorded Music NZ)	2
Norway (VG-lista)	10
Quebec Airplay (ADISQ)	9
Scottish Singles Sales (Official Charts)	25
UK Singles (Official Charts)	13
US Billboard Hot 100	2
US Alternative Airplay (Billboard)	6
US Mainstream Rock Airplay (Billboard)	2
US Cash Box Top 100	1

=== Year-end charts ===
Year-end chart performance for "Under the Bridge"
Chart (1992)	Position
Australia (ARIA)	9
Belgium (Ultratop 50 Flanders)	14
Brazil (Crowley)	42
Canada Top Singles (RPM)	21
Europe (Eurochart Hot 100)	96
Germany (Media Control)	39
Netherlands (Dutch Top 40)	8
Netherlands (Single Top 100)	6
New Zealand (RIANZ)	7
US Billboard Hot 100	8
US Album Rock Tracks (Billboard)	8
US Modern Rock Tracks (Billboard)	11
US Cash Box Top 100	5

Chart (1994)	Position
UK Singles (OCC)	131

=== Decade-end charts ===
Decade-end chart performance for "Under the Bridge"
Chart (2010–2019)	Position
US Top Airplay Spins (Nielsen Music)	9

== Certifications ==
Certifications and sales for "Under the Bridge"
Region	Certification	Certified units/sales
Australia (ARIA)	Platinum	70,000^{^}
Denmark (IFPI Danmark)	Platinum	90,000^{‡}
Germany (BVMI)	Platinum	600,000^{‡}
Italy (FIMI)	2× Platinum	200,000^{‡}
Netherlands (NVPI)	Gold	50,000^{^}
New Zealand (RMNZ)	9× Platinum	270,000^{‡}
Spain (Promusicae)	Platinum	60,000^{‡}
United Kingdom (BPI)	3× Platinum	1,800,000^{‡}
United States (RIAA)	Gold	500,000^{^}
United States (RIAA) Digital sales	6× Platinum	6,000,000^{‡}
^{^} Shipments figures based on certification alone.^{‡} Sales+streaming figures based on certification alone.

== All Saints version ==
"Under the Bridge"

Single by All Saints

from the album All Saints
- A-side: "Lady Marmalade"
- B-side: "No More Lies"; "Get Bizzy"
- Released: April 27, 1998
- Length: 5:00
- Label: London
- Songwriters: Flea; John Frusciante; Anthony Kiedis; Chad Smith
- Producers: Karl Gordon; Nellee Hooper

All Saints singles chronology
"Never Ever" (1997)	"Under the Bridge" / "Lady Marmalade" (1998)	"Bootie Call" (1998)

Music video
- "Under the Bridge" on YouTube

The English girl group All Saints released a cover of "Under the Bridge" as the third single from their debut album, All Saints (1997). In the UK and Australia, it was issued as a double A-side with a cover of the 1974 Labelle song "Lady Marmalade". It became All Saints' second number-one single on the UK singles chart.

=== Composition ===
The lyrics were altered because it contained personal lyrics by Kiedis, and the All Saints covered it because they liked the overall sound and feeling of the recording. The All Saints version contains samples of the original recording, the most important one being the distinctive guitar playing in the beginning. The Red Hot Chili Peppers were displeased with this version; Kiedis felt the cover was poorly recreated and, because the final verse, which contains the line "Under the bridge downtown / is where I drew some blood", was omitted, it lost all personal significance. He said: "It was kind of funny, they looked so pretty and clean, it looked like they didn't know what they were singing about". Richard Hawley played guitar on the cover.

=== Reception ===
British magazine Music Week gave the cover version a positive review, writing, "The soulful foursome weave their R&B spell around this classic Red Hot Chili Peppers song. Samples of the original [...] are included and this rendition loses none of the emotion."

=== Music video ===
Both videos were shot as a set and cost £500,000 to make. The videos took four months of production before release. The girls chose to perform their own stunts in the video, and at one point Natalie Appleton was knocked over by an explosion, although she remained unhurt.

=== Track listings and formats ===
Track listings for "Under the Bridge"
CD 1
1.	"Under the Bridge"	5:03
2.	"Lady Marmalade"	4:04
3.	"No More Lies"	4:08
4.	"Lady Marmalade" (Henry & Haynes La Jam mix)	9:23
5.	"Under the Bridge" (promo video)	5:00
CD 2
1.	"Lady Marmalade" (Mark!'s Miami Madness mix)	7:56
2.	"Lady Marmalade" (Sharp South Park vocal remix)	8:10
3.	"Under the Bridge" (Ignorants remix featuring Jean Paul e.s.q)	4:55
4.	"Get Bizzy"	3:45
"Lady Marmalade" single (Released in EU only)
1.	"Lady Marmalade" ('98 mix)	4:03
2.	"Lady Marmalade" (MARK's Miami Madness mix)	7:56
3.	"Lady Marmalade" (Sharp South Park vocal remix)	8:10
4.	"Lady Marmalade" (Henry & Haynes La Jam mix)	6:48

=== Personnel ===
Personnel for "Under the Bridge"
"Under the Bridge"
Lyrics and music	Red Hot Chili Peppers
Producers	Karl Gordon, Nellee Hooper
Original album	Blood Sugar Sex Magik by Red Hot Chili Peppers
"Lady Marmalade"
Lyrics and music	Bob Crewe and Kenny Nolan
Producer	Johnny Douglas and John Benson
Original album	Nightbirds by LaBelle

=== Charts ===
==== Weekly charts ====
Weekly chart performance for "Under the Bridge"
Chart (1998)	Peak position
Australia (ARIA) with "Lady Marmalade"	5
Austria (Ö3 Austria Top 40)	28
Belgium (Ultratop 50 Flanders)	33
Belgium (Ultratop 50 Wallonia)	12
Estonia (Eesti Top 20)	10
Europe (Eurochart Hot 100) with "Lady Marmalade"	6
Finland (Suomen virallinen lista)	10
France (SNEP)	31
Germany (GfK)	37
Ireland (IRMA)	3
Italy Airplay (Music & Media)	5
Netherlands (Dutch Top 40)	12
Netherlands (Single Top 100)	18
New Zealand (Recorded Music NZ) with "Lady Marmalade"	4
Norway (VG-lista)	16
Scottish Singles Sales (Official Charts) with "Lady Marmalade"	2
Sweden (Sverigetopplistan)	16
Switzerland (Schweizer Hitparade)	24
UK Singles (Official Charts) with "Lady Marmalade"	1
UK Airplay (Music Week)	2
UK Hip Hop/R&B (Official Charts) with "Lady Marmalade"	1

==== Year-end charts ====
Year-end chart performance for "Under the Bridge"
Chart (1998)	Position
Australia (ARIA)	45
Belgium (Ultratop 50 Wallonia)	66
Europe (Eurochart Hot 100)	77
UK Singles (OCC)	27

=== Certifications ===
Certifications and sales for "Under the Bridge"
Region	Certification	Certified units/sales
Australia (ARIA)	Gold	35,000^{^}
United Kingdom (BPI)	Gold	432,000
^{^} Shipments figures based on certification alone.

=== Release history ===
Release dates and formats for "Under the Bridge"
Region	Date	Format	Label	Ref.
United Kingdom	April 27, 1998	CD; cassette	London	
Japan	September 9, 1998	CD	London	

== See also ==
- List of best-selling singles

== Bibliography ==
- Apter, Jeff (2004). Fornication: The Red Hot Chili Peppers Story. Omnibus Press. ISBN 1-84449-381-4.
- Kiedis, Anthony; Sloman, Larry (2004). Scar Tissue. Hyperion. ISBN 1-4013-0101-0.
