= Give It Away (Red Hot Chili Peppers song) =

1991 single by Red Hot Chili Peppers

Single by Red Hot Chili Peppers

from the album Blood Sugar Sex Magik
- B-side: "Search and Destroy"; "Soul to Squeeze"
- Released: September 4, 1991
- Recorded: 1991
- Studio: The Mansion (Los Angeles)
- Genre: Funk rock; funk metal; hard rock; rap rock
- Length: 4:43 (album version); 3:47 (edit)
- Label: Warner Bros.
- Songwriters: Flea; John Frusciante; Anthony Kiedis; Chad Smith
- Producer: Rick Rubin

Red Hot Chili Peppers singles chronology
"Show Me Your Soul" (1990)	"Give It Away" (1991)	"Under the Bridge" (1992)

Music video
- "Give It Away" on YouTube

"Give It Away" is a song by American rock band Red Hot Chili Peppers from the group's fifth studio album, Blood Sugar Sex Magik (1991). It was released as the lead single from their album in September 1991 by Warner Bros. Records.

The music was written by guitarist John Frusciante and bassist Flea during a jam session months prior to the album recording sessions. Vocalist Anthony Kiedis wrote the song's most prevalent lyrical refrain in response to an experience he shared with former girlfriend Nina Hagen regarding altruistic behavior and the value of selflessness.

"Give It Away" went on to achieve international fame, reaching number one on the Billboard Modern Rock Tracks in late 1991, giving the band their first ever number one single. In 1992 the single charted inside the top 75 of the US Hot 100 in the wake of the huge success of the record's second single "Under the Bridge". "Give It Away" also became the band's first top ten hit in the United Kingdom, where it peaked at number nine on the UK Singles Chart; this did not occur until February 1994, nearly two and a half years after it was first released in the US.

The accompanying music video, which was directed by French film-maker Stéphane Sednaoui, was put into heavy rotation on music-television stations such as MTV and added to the band's success. Since its release, "Give It Away" has gone on to receive numerous accolades, including a Grammy Award for the Best Hard Rock Performance With Vocals in 1992. Steve Huey of AllMusic noted that while the single "didn't achieve the massive pop success of its follow-up, 'Under the Bridge' [...] it did become one of the band's most instantly recognizable songs."

== Origins and recording ==
Guitarist John Frusciante and bassist Flea wrote much of "Give It Away" during jam sessions in the early 1990s. Following the Chili Peppers' tour in support of Mother's Milk (1989), the duo spent time in a side project called H.A.T.E. with members of Fishbone. During their tenure in the group, the guitarist and bassist created the main riff and accompanying bassline for "Give It Away". The rhythm was played at several H.A.T.E. performances shortly thereafter, but when the side project disbanded Frusciante and Flea believed the track would be appropriate for the Chili Peppers' upcoming record. Vocalist Anthony Kiedis agreed, and upon hearing the rest of the Chili Peppers play the song he began chanting "give it away, give it away, give it away now". The phrase had been something the vocalist intended to incorporate into a song for the band's new record, but it was not until he heard the bassline that the lyrics fit. Kiedis said: "I was so struck by Flea's bass part, which covered the whole length of the instrument's neck, that I jumped up and marched over to the mic, my notebook in tow. I always had fragments of songs and ideas or even specific isolated phrases in mind."

The song was recorded between April and June 1991 at The Mansion in Los Angeles, California. Through the recording of "Give It Away" came a practice of crafting songs that the band would continue to use on every album following Blood Sugar Sex Magik. When the group encountered difficulty in composing a bridge for the song, it developed a tool the members colloquially termed "face-offs". Flea and Frusciante were unable to come to an agreement on guitar or bass progressions, but separately crafted part of the song. The band then reconvened at a later time and chose the most appropriate inclusion. With "Give It Away", a chorus and verse had already been written but a bridge was lacking, so thus they partook in a "face-off".

== Lyrics and meaning ==
The lyrical meaning behind "Give It Away" is centered on the philosophy of selflessness and altruistic behavior. The song is titled after its most prevalent lyrical phrase "give it away", which is taken from an experience Kiedis had with his former girlfriend—punk rock singer Nina Hagen—in the early 1980s. Hagen was several years Kiedis's senior and became a role-model during his drug addiction to heroin: "she realized how young and inexperienced I was then, so she was always passing on gems to me, not in a preachy way, just by seizing on opportunities." When Kiedis was looking through her closet he came across a jacket he liked, and commented to Hagen that it was "really cool". Upon expressing this, Hagen immediately told him to keep it. Her reasoning behind this selflessness was due to an attempt to constantly make her life more enjoyable, and explained to Kiedis that "if you have a closet full of clothes and you try to keep them all, your life will get very small. But if you have a full closet and someone sees something they like, if you give it to them, the world is a better place."

The act was something that affected Kiedis significantly because he had never before experienced such an enlightening ideology on life. Growing up in Los Angeles, he had always thought differently from Hagen. Instead of giving material possessions away and being free thinking, the vocalist believed one must take what one wants, as no one else will provide. Instead, he now adopted Hagen's philosophy: "It was such an epiphany that someone would want to give me her favorite thing. That stuck with me forever. Every time I'd be thinking 'I have to keep,' I'd remember 'No, you gotta give away instead.' When I started going regularly to [drug and alcohol] meetings, one of the principles I had learned was that the way to maintain your own sobriety is to give it to another suffering alcoholic. Every time you empty your vessel of that energy, fresh new energy comes flooding in." Flea's bassline for the song allowed Kiedis to recall this incident and he believed the music paired perfectly with the lyrics. During the verses, Kiedis departs from the idea of unselfishness and sings about a variety of topics including long-time friend River Phoenix, musician Bob Marley and various sexual themes including fertility and lust.

== Music and composition ==
"Give It Away" is performed in the time signature of 4/4 time. The track begins with a distinctively "dry" guitar tone that is similar in style to the rest of the record. Producer Rick Rubin had a considerable influence on the sound of Blood Sugar Sex Magik by removing much of the reverb and guitar layering that epitomized the band's previous album Mother's Milk. This caused the record to contain simpler and dryer guitar and bass chords that were not filtered through guitar effects—those that did, however, were made with vintage electronics from the 1960s and 70s. For "Give It Away", along with the rest of the album, Rubin sought to achieve a sense of atmosphere that was similar to 60s records that were made without commercialism or viability in mind and to downplay on "big" sounds: "What you hear is what you get—there's not a lot of trickery. A lot of people want the biggest sound, with walls of guitar and huge drums. But I don't think those things matter." The song follows a traditional verse-chorus-verse structure; when Kiedis begins singing, Frusciante jumps into a funk-oriented riff that is repeated throughout the verse while Flea plays a bass line that uses virtually the entire length of the fretboard.

During the chorus, Kiedis sings "Give it away, give it away, give it away now" repeatedly over a more rapid guitar riff before Frusciante provides, according to Steve Huey of Allmusic, a "sudden contrast to Kiedis's hyperactivity in the form of a languid solo pre-recorded and dubbed backwards over the rhythm track". The solo was recorded in one take because Frusciante had developed a preference towards speedy execution and a raw feeling; according to Flea, "We did very little fix-up stuff. John's philosophy was that he would only play a solo twice. He'd play it once, and if he didn't like it or we didn't like it, he'd play it again—completely different. And that was it." "Give It Away" also makes use of other instruments like the jew's harp, which was played by band friend Pete Weiss. The song continues through several verses and choruses before reaching a bridge that introduces the outro, which consists of "a hard-rocking riff" that, according to Huey, strongly resembles the main riff from Black Sabbath's "Sweet Leaf" from their 1971 record Master of Reality. Kiedis repeats "Give it away now" for several measures before the guitar, bass and drums drop out.

== Release and reception ==
"Give It Away" was released as the lead single from Blood Sugar Sex Magik in early September 1991, shortly before the record went on sale. Warner Bros. sought to premiere the song on a popular rock radio station in Texas, but were turned down when the format refused to air the track—they told employees at the label to "come back to us when you have a melody in your song". The band then embarked on a short press tour through Europe in order to promote the record; it was during this time that KROQ-FM, a Los Angeles-based modern rock station, began to place "Give It Away" on heavy rotation. According to Kiedis, "That was the beginning of the infusion of those songs into mass consciousness."

Critical reception to the song, much like the album, was highly positive. Jeff Vice of Deseret News noted "[this] dynamic first single that pays homage to Bob Marley, may start a new musical trend with its brilliant Rasta-funk". Patrick MacDonald of The Seattle Times commented that "[Blood Sugar Sex Magik] includes one of the best songs the Peppers have done—'Give It Away', the first single. The hook is irresistible and the message, about 'material excess', is delivered simply and straightforwardly." Steve Huey of AllMusic felt the song was enhanced by Kiedis's lyrics, which were "a free-associative mixture of positive vibes, tributes to musical heroes, and free love, and their literal meaning was often as difficult to understand as Kiedis's nasal, staccato enunciation. But that distinctive vocal style helped make the most comprehensible lines even catchier and more memorable, greatly enhancing the song's appeal." He continued by praising the track's music: "John Frusciante's guitar should not be underappreciated either; his noisy, scratchy funk-rock work add[s] depth and texture to the powerhouse rhythm section of Flea and Chad Smith." Steven Wells from NME declared it as "screamingly anti-materialist". Another editor, Terry Staunton, opined, "A tad sluggish compared to usual Chili Peppers fare, this has been a big hit in America but will not be here. Anthony Kiedis sounds horribly like Aerosmith's Steve Tyler". Jay Clarke of the Richmond Times-Dispatch felt "Give It Away" was "a journey into the funky world of Kiedis and Flea. This song invigorates better than the heaviest metal or the most hard-core rap." Tom Moon of Rolling Stone noted: "The pummeling 'Give It Away' [...] established a template for rock punctuated by the beatcentric relentlessness of hip-hop that would be appropriated by everyone." Mark Sutherland from UK magazine Smash Hits gave it four out of five, declaring it as "an almighty funky beast of a rock stomper that will have entire nations dancing like constipated chickens and might just make them as hay-uge here as they are in the States".

Since the song's release, it has become a notable factor in the Red Hot Chili Peppers' success and has won a variety of accolades. "Give It Away" won a Grammy Award at the 35th Ceremony in 1993 for the "Best Hard Rock Performance". In 1994 "Give It Away" was included in the Rock and Roll Hall of Fame's unordered list of the "500 Songs That Shaped Rock"; in 2002 Kerrang! placed the song at number 67 in their list of the "100 Greatest Singles of All Time"; in 2004 Q included it in their unordered list of the "1001 Songs You Must Own!"; and VH1 awarded the song the 50th spot in its 2009 compilation of the "100 Greatest Hard Rock Songs". Kerrang! and Rolling Stone both named "Give It Away" as the Red Hot Chili Peppers' fourth-best song.

== Music video ==
Frusciante playing a reflective silver Fender Stratocaster and wearing sequined pants in the music video for "Give It Away".

The music video for "Give It Away" was made by French fashion photographer and director Stéphane Sednaoui. Kiedis wanted the video to be visually distinct and readily identifiable but disliked much of the material Warner Bros. sent for him to choose from: "I started viewing reels and reels and reels of video directors but nothing looked good to me. Everything was the same, boring, homogenized, contrived shit." Upon finding Sednaoui's reel, however, the singer said it was "like nothing else. It was slower and poetic, shot in black and white. It seemed like authentic art, not something shot for MTV." He and Flea met with Sednaoui to talk about the video, for which the director proposed a "very desolated [and] very graphic landscape", while heavily focusing on the band members with little to no outside influence. It was decided that the video would be filmed in black and white while Sednaoui took the idea of painting the band members with silver acrylic from previous photo shoots he had done. The photographer recalls that he was "amazed by what [the band] gave me because they went far far far beyond what I was expecting and I think that's one of my best experiences in that regard". The overall mood of the video was intended to be a personification of the song, upbeat and lively.

Sednaoui experimented with a variety of cinematography techniques including wide-angle lenses, shots from below the subjects, superimposition, vertically cut screens displaying different angles of the same shot, reverse film effects, multiple lighting situations and flashy clothing to convey his concept. Frusciante noted the feeling of the video to be extremely vibrant and over-the-top: "When it was us just painting ourselves silver and wearing these big silver boots and stuff, I mean it felt like glam rock or something."

The video begins with a wide-angle shot of Flea in a desert setting wearing pants with several gold-colored horns protruding from each leg. The bassist is standing in a meditative stance and brings his arms together above his head when the music begins to play. The video then transitions between a variety of shots edited together that consist of the four band members standing with their eyes closed; the band dancing around in a dimly lit setting; a ground view of Frusciante playing a reflective silver Fender Stratocaster in between his legs while wearing pants made up entirely of small pieces of mirror; the band members moving around with full makeup on; and the band members dancing frenziedly. Kiedis adopted a deliberately outlandish wardrobe which incorporated gold lipstick, revealing mesh shorts and bright silver boots.

During the backwards guitar solo, Frusciante was filmed waving a large aluminum ribbon; Kiedis was initially apprehensive about Sednaoui's desire for the guitarist to do so, believing he would tell the director: "'Fuck you and take that dancing ribbon and shove it up your French ass, buddy' but [Frusciante] gladly went off and made love to the air with this dancing ribbon. He would have danced around for hours with that thing." The footage was edited in reverse to complement the solo. While some of the scenes were planned with a storyboard, much of it was improvised or made up on the spot over the two-day shoot. During a particular scene Kiedis began to move his tongue flamboyantly to dramatically accentuate the lyrics, which Sednaoui believed was extremely beneficial to the exuberant nature of the video. Where the video begins in what appears to be the daytime, it concludes at dusk with silhouettes of the band members running into the setting sun.

The video—which cost an estimated $140,000 to produce—was completed while Kiedis and Frusciante were on a promotional trip through Europe in support of Blood Sugar Sex Magik. When the vocalist first saw it, he was "more hysterically ecstatic about that piece of visual footage than anything [the band had] ever done". Warner Bros. executives, however, were worried that the content would be "too weird" or "too artsy" for the general public and favored a more traditional premise in contrast to the experimental approach Sednaoui took. The video was ultimately released on September 4, 1991, without being edited by the record label; since then it has been widely credited as being a considerable factor in the Red Hot Chili Peppers' success and greatly increased their international popularity. Journalist Jeff Apter noted the video's "funky brew of goofy looks, a subtle invasive hook, Flea's spindly fingered baseline and Kiedis's crotch-hugging shorts made the clip essential viewing across MTV throughout the last few months of 1991". Steve Huey of AllMusic wrote in his review of the song that "MTV jumped all over the visually distinctive video." Nominated for three awards—"Best Alternative Video", "Breakthrough Video", and "Best Art Direction"—at the 1992 MTV Video Music Awards, it won the latter two.

== Live performances ==
"Give It Away" was performed for the first time on October 7, 1991 at The Music Machine in West Los Angeles, CA at a benefit show.As of 2026, the song has been performed live by the band over 1,000 times, the most out of any of the band's songs and 35 years after its first performance; it remains a staple in the band's setlists, often closing the show’s main set or encore. The band has performed the song on various talk shows and other events, including Saturday Night Live on March 6, 2006; as well as during the Super Bowl XLVIII halftime show on February 2, 2014. The Los Angeles Rams (of which the band members are fans) play the song prior to the start of the fourth quarter during home games at SoFi Stadium.

== Formats and track listing ==
- US cassette single (1991)
1. "Give It Away" – 4:43
2. "Search and Destroy" – 3:34
- European cassette single (1991)
1. "Give It Away" – 4:43
2. "Soul to Squeeze" – 4:52
- 7-inch single 1 (1991)
1. "Give It Away" – 4:43
2. "Give It Away" (12-inch Mix) – 6:02
- 7-inch single 2 (1991)
1. "Give It Away" – 4:43
2. "Search and Destroy – 3:34
- 12-inch single (1991)
1. "Give It Away" (12-inch Mix) – 6:02
2. "Give It Away" (Rasta Mix) – 6:47
3. "Give It Away" (Single Mix) – 4:46
4. "Search and Destroy" – 3:34
5. "Give It Away" – 4:43
- CD single 1 (1991)
1. "Give It Away" – 4:43
2. "Search and Destroy" – 3:34
3. "Soul to Squeeze" – 4:52
- CD single 2 (1991)
1. "Give It Away" (Single Mix) – 4:46
2. "Give It Away" (12-inch Mix) – 6:02
3. "Search and Destroy" – 3:34
4. "Give It Away" (Rasta Mix) – 6:47
5. "Give It Away" – 4:43
- CD single 3 (1992)
1. "Give It Away" (Single Mix) – 4:46
2. "Give It Away" (12-inch Mix) – 6:02
3. "Search and Destroy" – 3:34
4. "Give It Away" (Rasta Mix) – 6:47
5. "Give It Away" – 4:43
6. "Soul to Squeeze" – 4:52
- European 12-inch (1993)
1. "Give It Away" (12-inch Mix) – 6:02
2. "Give It Away" (Rasta Mix) – 6:47
3. "If You Have to Ask" (Disco-Krisco Mix) – 7:12
- CD single 4 (1994 CD1 re-release)
1. "Give It Away" (Single Mix) – 4:46
2. "Give It Away" (12-inch Mix) – 6:02
3. "Give It Away" (Rasta Mix) – 6:47
4. "Soul to Squeeze" – 4:52
- CD single 5 (1994 CD2 re-release)
1. "Give It Away" (Edit) – 3:46
2. "If You Have to Ask" (Friday Night Fever Blister Mix) – 6:34
3. "If You Have to Ask" (Scott & Garth Mix) – 7:12
4. "Nobody Weird Like Me" (Live) – 5:03

== Personnel ==
Red Hot Chili Peppers

- Anthony Kiedis – vocals
- John Frusciante – guitar
- Flea – bass
- Chad Smith – drums, tambourine

Additional musicians

- Brendan O'Brien – Hammond B3 organ
- Pete Weiss – Juice harp

== Charts ==
=== Weekly charts ===
Weekly chart performance for "Give It Away"
Chart (1991–1994)	Peak position
Australia (ARIA)	41
Belgium (Ultratop 50 Flanders)	30
Europe (Eurochart Hot 100)	27
France (SNEP)	49
Ireland (IRMA)	19
Netherlands (Single Top 100)	42
New Zealand (Recorded Music NZ)	22
Scottish Singles Sales (Official Charts)	78
UK Singles (Official Charts)	9
US Billboard Hot 100	73
US Alternative Airplay (Billboard)	1

=== Year-end charts ===
Year-end chart performance for "Give It Away"
Chart (1991)	Position
US Modern Rock Tracks (Billboard)	24

Chart (1992)	Position
Brazil (Crowley)	84

Chart (1994)	Position
UK Singles (OCC)	167

== Certifications ==
Certifications and sales for "Give It Away"
Region	Certification	Certified units/sales
New Zealand (RMNZ)	2× Platinum	60,000^{‡}
Spain (Promusicae)	Gold	30,000^{‡}
United Kingdom (BPI)	Platinum	600,000^{‡}
United States (RIAA)	2× Platinum	2,000,000^{‡}
^{‡} Sales+streaming figures based on certification alone.

== Release history ==
Release dates and formats for "Give It Away"
Region	Date	Format(s)	Label(s)	Ref.
United States	1991	—N/a	Warner Bros.	
Australia	October 7, 1991	12-inch vinyl; CD; cassette	Warner Bros.	
Japan	March 10, 1992	CD	Warner Bros.	
United Kingdom	January 24, 1994	12-inch vinyl; CD; cassette	Warner Bros.	

== Cover version ==
- A double-parody of "Give It Away" and "Under the Bridge" titled "Bedrock Anthem" was recorded by "Weird Al" Yankovic in his 1993 album Alapalooza.
- Mr. Bungle performed a mock version of the song in 1999, as part of a halloween concert parodying Red Hot Chili Peppers.
- Busta Rhymes used the "Give it away, give it away, give it away now" lyrics in his 2001 song Break Ya Neck. The members of the Red Hot Chili Peppers are listed in the songwriting credits.
- Idina Menzel performed a few bars of the song as part of her exit music on her 2015 World Tour.
