= List of songs recorded by Red Hot Chili Peppers =

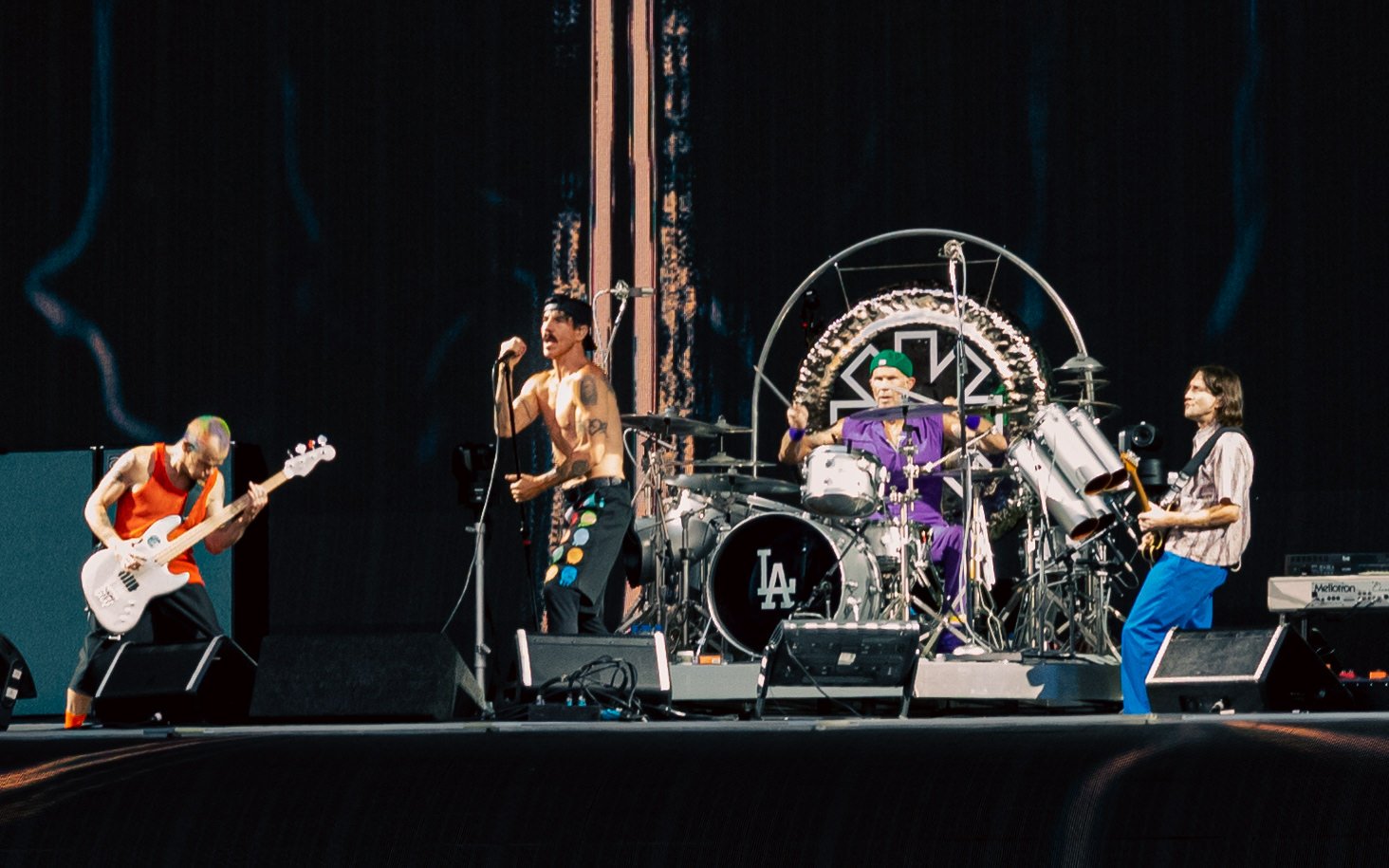
Red Hot Chili Peppers performing in 2022

The American funk rock band Red Hot Chili Peppers have released over 250 songs since 1984. Formed in 1982 by vocalist Anthony Kiedis, bassist Flea, guitarist Hillel Slovak, and drummer Jack Irons, the group recorded their self-titled debut album the following year with producer Andy Gill. Recorded instead with guitarist Jack Sherman and drummer Cliff Martinez, the album introduced the band's funk metal style and served as an introduction to the band's rap rock-roots. Slovak returned to the band for the George Clinton-produced Freaky Styley (1985). Their pure funk album, its songs are noticeably influenced by Clinton and Slovak, whose guitar playing helped shape the group as a cohesive unit. The Uplift Mofo Party Plan (1987) was produced by Michael Beinhorn and featured all four founding members. It features the band's signature funk rock style, with reggae and heavy metal influences. Following Slovak's death from a drug overdose in 1988, Irons left the band, forcing Kiedis and Flea to regroup with guitarist John Frusciante and drummer Chad Smith for their next album, Mother's Milk (1989). Featuring the singles "Knock Me Down" and the Stevie Wonder-cover "Higher Ground", the album was propelled by Frusciante's guitar-playing, who altered the band's sound to a more melodic focus, and a wider range of musical styles.

Blood Sugar Sex Magik (1991), their first album produced by Rick Rubin, featured lyrics containing sexual references and innuendos, along with some discussing breakups and drug addictions. Its songs also greater emphasize melody, while not losing touch of the band's funk roots. Featuring the singles "Give It Away" and "Under the Bridge", the album propelled the band to international stardom, which led Frusciante to depart during its supporting tour. The group's follow-up, One Hot Minute (1995), recorded with former Jane's Addiction guitarist Dave Navarro, made prominent use of heavy metal guitar riffs and hints of psychedelic rock and less funk than its predecessor. Its lyrics reflected Kiedis' struggles with drug addictions at the time. Frusciante returned to the band for their next album, Californication (1999). His return changed the band's sound once again to a more alternative rock-sound, along with more pop-oriented songs ("Scar Tissue", "Otherside"). Kiedis' vocals have a more melodic sensibility, along with more varied lyrical themes including death, California, drugs, globalization, and travel. By the Way (2002) represented a departure from their signature punk-funk fusion, with a greater emphasis on harmony and texture, along with backing harmony vocals and string arrangements and more reflective lyrics. The 2006 double album Stadium Arcadium brought together musical aspects from their entire career, with Kiedis being more versatile as a vocalist, Frusciante layering his guitars, Flea varying his bass playing, and Smith being versatile on the drums. Frusciante departed the band a second time following its supporting tour.

I'm with You (2011), their first album with guitarist Josh Klinghoffer and last produced by Rubin, featured songs whose guitars were interwoven with the music itself, despite Klinghoffer's heavy-layered sound, along with piano contributions by Flea. Its lyrics deal with themes of life and death, poverty, the beginning of relationships, and the dashing of dreams and wishes. Numerous outtakes from the album, known as the I'm with You Sessions, were released as singles between 2012 and 2013, eventually being compiled on the compilation album I'm Beside You. The Getaway (2016), produced by Danger Mouse, represented a major creative musical diversity for the band, featuring songs influenced by disco, psychedelia, and their signature punk-funk sound, with lyrics reflecting heartbreak. In 2019, Klinghoffer departed the group, with Frusciante returning as guitarist. The band released two double albums in 2022, Unlimited Love and Return of the Dream Canteen, both produced by Rubin.

== Songs ==
Key
‡	Indicates song not written by Red Hot Chili Peppers
#	Indicates song released as a live recording

Name of song, writers, original release, producer(s), and year of release
Song	Writers	Original release	Producer(s)	Year	Ref.
"21st Century"	Anthony Kiedis; Flea; Chad Smith; John Frusciante	Stadium Arcadium	Rick Rubin	2006	
"Aquatic Mouth Dance"	Anthony Kiedis; Flea; Chad Smith; John Frusciante	Unlimited Love	Rick Rubin	2022	
"Aeroplane"	Anthony Kiedis; Flea; Chad Smith; Dave Navarro	One Hot Minute	Rick Rubin	1995	
"The Adventures of Rain Dance Maggie"	Anthony Kiedis; Flea; Chad Smith; Josh Klinghoffer	I'm with You	Rick Rubin	2011	
"Afterlife"	Anthony Kiedis; Flea; Chad Smith; John Frusciante	Return of the Dream Canteen	Rick Rubin	2022	
"American Ghost Dance"	Anthony Kiedis; Flea; Cliff Martinez; Jack Sherman	Freaky Styley	George Clinton	1985	
"An Opening" #	Anthony Kiedis; Flea; Chad Smith; John Frusciante	B-side of "Hump de Bump"	Rick Rubin	2007	
"Animal Bar"	Anthony Kiedis; Flea; Chad Smith; John Frusciante	Stadium Arcadium	Rick Rubin	2006	
"Annie Wants a Baby"	Anthony Kiedis; Flea; Chad Smith; Josh Klinghoffer	I'm with You	Rick Rubin	2011	
"Apache Rose Peacock"	Anthony Kiedis; Flea; Chad Smith; John Frusciante	Blood Sugar Sex Magik	Rick Rubin	1991	
"Around the World"	Anthony Kiedis; Flea; Chad Smith; John Frusciante	Californication	Rick Rubin	1999	
"Baby Appeal"	Flea; Anthony Kiedis; Jack Sherman; Cliff Martinez; Hillel Slovak	The Red Hot Chili Peppers	Andy Gill	1984	
"Bag of Grins"	Anthony Kiedis; Flea; Chad Smith; John Frusciante	Return of the Dream Canteen	Rick Rubin	2022	
"Backwoods"	Anthony Kiedis; Flea; Hillel Slovak; Jack Irons	The Uplift Mofo Party Plan	Michael Beinhorn	1987	
"Bastards of Light"	Anthony Kiedis; Flea; Chad Smith; John Frusciante	Unlimited Love	Rick Rubin	2022	
"Battleship"	Anthony Kiedis; Flea; Cliff Martinez; Jack Sherman	Freaky Styley	George Clinton	1985	
"Bella"	Anthony Kiedis; Flea; Chad Smith; John Frusciante	Return of the Dream Canteen	Rick Rubin	2022	
"Behind the Sun"	Anthony Kiedis; Flea; Hillel Slovak; Jack Irons; Michael Beinhorn	The Uplift Mofo Party Plan	Michael Beinhorn	1987	
"Beverly Hills" # (Circle Jerks cover)	Keith Morris; Roger Rogerson ‡	The Bridge School Collection, Vol.1	Red Hot Chili Peppers	2006	
"Bicycle Song"	Anthony Kiedis; Flea; Chad Smith; John Frusciante	By the Way (deluxe edition)	Rick Rubin	2006	
"Black Cross" # (45 Grave cover)	Wiley Cutler ‡	Live in Hyde Park	Red Hot Chili Peppers	2004	
"Brandy" # (Looking Glass cover)	Elliot Lurie ‡	Live in Hyde Park	Red Hot Chili Peppers	2004	
"Black Summer"	Anthony Kiedis; Flea; Chad Smith; John Frusciante	Unlimited Love	Rick Rubin	2022	
"Blackeyed Blonde"	Anthony Kiedis; Flea; Cliff Martinez; Jack Sherman	Freaky Styley	George Clinton	1985	
"Blood Sugar Sex Magik"	Anthony Kiedis; Flea; Chad Smith; John Frusciante	Blood Sugar Sex Magik	Rick Rubin	1991	
"Blues for Meister"	Flea ‡	Out in L.A.	Red Hot Chili Peppers	1994	
"Bob"	Anthony Kiedis; Flea; Chad Smith; Dave Navarro	One Hot Minute (deluxe edition)	Rick Rubin	2006	
"Body of Water"	Anthony Kiedis; Flea; Chad Smith; John Frusciante	B-side of "The Zephyr Song" (CD1)	Rick Rubin	2002	
"Brave from Afar" (Note: Later released on the compilation I'm Beside You (2013))	Anthony Kiedis; Flea; Chad Smith; Josh Klinghoffer	I'm with You Sessions	Rick Rubin	2013	
"Breaking the Girl"	Anthony Kiedis; Flea; Chad Smith; John Frusciante	Blood Sugar Sex Magik	Rick Rubin	1991	
"Brendan's Death Song"	Anthony Kiedis; Flea; Chad Smith; Josh Klinghoffer	I'm with You	Rick Rubin	2011	
"The Brothers Cup"	Anthony Kiedis; Flea; Hillel Slovak; Jack Irons	Freaky Styley	George Clinton	1985	
"Buckle Down"	Flea; Anthony Kiedis; Jack Sherman; Cliff Martinez	The Red Hot Chili Peppers	Andy Gill	1984	
"Bunker Hill"	Anthony Kiedis; Flea; Chad Smith; John Frusciante	B-side of "Fortune Faded" (CD1)	Rick Rubin	2003	
"By the Way"	Anthony Kiedis; Flea; Chad Smith; John Frusciante	By the Way	Rick Rubin	2002	
"C'mon Girl"	Anthony Kiedis; Flea; Chad Smith; John Frusciante	Stadium Arcadium	Rick Rubin	2006	
"Cabron"	Anthony Kiedis; Flea; Chad Smith; John Frusciante	By the Way	Rick Rubin	2002	
"Californication"	Anthony Kiedis; Flea; Chad Smith; John Frusciante	Californication	Rick Rubin	1999	
"Can't Stop"	Anthony Kiedis; Flea; Chad Smith; John Frusciante	By the Way	Rick Rubin	2002	
"Carry Me Home"	Anthony Kiedis; Flea; Chad Smith; John Frusciante	Return of the Dream Canteen	Rick Rubin	2022	
"Castles Made of Sand" # (Jimi Hendrix cover)	Jimi Hendrix ‡	Out in L.A.	Michael Beinhorn	1994	
"Catch My Death"	Anthony Kiedis; Flea; Chad Smith; Josh Klinghoffer	I'm with You Sessions	Rick Rubin	2013	
"Catholic School Girls Rule"	Anthony Kiedis; Flea; Cliff Martinez; Jack Sherman	Freaky Styley	George Clinton	1985	
"A Certain Someone"	Anthony Kiedis; Flea; Chad Smith; John Frusciante	B-side of "Tell Me Baby" (CD1)	Rick Rubin	2006	
"Charlie"	Anthony Kiedis; Flea; Chad Smith; John Frusciante	Stadium Arcadium	Rick Rubin	2006	
"Christchurch Fireworks Music" #	Anthony Kiedis; Flea; Chad Smith; John Frusciante	B-side of "Can't Stop"	Rick Rubin	2002	
"Coffee Shop"	Anthony Kiedis; Flea; Chad Smith; Dave Navarro	One Hot Minute	Rick Rubin	1995	
"Copperbelly"	Anthony Kiedis; Flea; Chad Smith; John Frusciante	Return of the Dream Canteen	Rick Rubin	2022	
"Crosstown Traffic" # (Jimi Hendrix cover)	Jimi Hendrix ‡	Mother's Milk (2003 remastered edition)	Michael Beinhorn	2003	
"Dance, Dance, Dance"	Anthony Kiedis; Flea; Chad Smith; Josh Klinghoffer	I'm with You	Rick Rubin	2011	
"Dani California"	Anthony Kiedis; Flea; Chad Smith; John Frusciante	Stadium Arcadium	Rick Rubin	2006	
"Dark Necessities"	Anthony Kiedis; Flea; Chad Smith; Josh Klinghoffer; Brian Burton	The Getaway	Danger Mouse	2016	
"Death of a Martian"	Anthony Kiedis; Flea; Chad Smith; John Frusciante	Stadium Arcadium	Rick Rubin	2006	
"Deck the Halls"	Traditional ‡	Out in L.A.	Red Hot Chili Peppers	1994	
"Deep Kick"	Anthony Kiedis; Flea; Chad Smith; Dave Navarro	One Hot Minute	Rick Rubin	1995	
"Desecration Smile"	Anthony Kiedis; Flea; Chad Smith; John Frusciante	Stadium Arcadium	Rick Rubin	2006	
"Detroit"	Anthony Kiedis; Flea; Chad Smith; Josh Klinghoffer	The Getaway	Danger Mouse	2016	
"Did I Let You Know"	Anthony Kiedis; Flea; Chad Smith; Josh Klinghoffer	I'm with You	Rick Rubin	2011	
"Don't Forget Me"	Anthony Kiedis; Flea; Chad Smith; John Frusciante	By the Way	Rick Rubin	2002	
"Dosed"	Anthony Kiedis; Flea; Chad Smith; John Frusciante	By the Way	Rick Rubin	2002	
"Dreams of a Samurai"	Anthony Kiedis; Flea; Chad Smith; Josh Klinghoffer	The Getaway	Danger Mouse	2016	
"Drum Homage Medley" (Note: Drum medley of "Rock and Roll" and "Good Times Bad Times" by Led Zeppelin, "Sunday Bloody Sunday" by U2, and "We Will Rock You" by Queen) #	Various ‡	Live in Hyde Park	Red Hot Chili Peppers	2004	
"The Drummer"	Anthony Kiedis; Flea; Chad Smith; John Frusciante	Return of the Dream Canteen	Rick Rubin	2022	
"Dr. Funkenstein" # (Parliament cover)	George Clinton; Bootsy Collins; Bernie Worrell ‡	Under the Covers: Essential Red Hot Chili Peppers	Red Hot Chili Peppers	1998	
"Easily"	Anthony Kiedis; Flea; Chad Smith; John Frusciante	Californication	Rick Rubin	1999	
"Eddie"	Anthony Kiedis; Flea; Chad Smith; John Frusciante	Return of the Dream Canteen	Rick Rubin	2022	
"Emit Remmus"	Anthony Kiedis; Flea; Chad Smith; John Frusciante	Californication	Rick Rubin	1999	
"Encore"	Anthony Kiedis; Flea; Chad Smith; Josh Klinghoffer	The Getaway	Danger Mouse	2016	
"End of Show Brisbane" #	Anthony Kiedis; Flea; Chad Smith; John Frusciante	B-side of "Californication"	Rick Rubin	2000	
"End of Show State College" #	Anthony Kiedis; Flea; Chad Smith; John Frusciante	B-side of "Californication"	Rick Rubin	2000	
"Eskimo"	Anthony Kiedis; Flea; Chad Smith; John Frusciante	B-side of "Fortune Faded" (CD1)	Rick Rubin	2003	
"Especially in Michigan"	Anthony Kiedis; Flea; Chad Smith; John Frusciante	Stadium Arcadium	Rick Rubin	2006	
"Ethiopia"	Anthony Kiedis; Flea; Chad Smith; Josh Klinghoffer	I'm with You	Rick Rubin	2011	
"Even You Brutus?"	Anthony Kiedis; Flea; Chad Smith; Josh Klinghoffer	I'm with You	Rick Rubin	2011	
"Everybody Knows This Is Nowhere" # (Neil Young cover)	Neil Young ‡	Rock & Roll Hall of Fame Covers EP	Rick Rubin	2012	
"Factory of Faith"	Anthony Kiedis; Flea; Chad Smith; Josh Klinghoffer	I'm with You	Rick Rubin	2011	
"Fake as Fu@k"	Anthony Kiedis; Flea; Chad Smith; John Frusciante	Return of the Dream Canteen	Rick Rubin	2022	
"Falling into Grace"	Anthony Kiedis; Flea; Chad Smith; Dave Navarro	One Hot Minute	Rick Rubin	1995	
"Fat Dance"	Anthony Kiedis; Flea; Chad Smith; John Frusciante	Californication (deluxe edition)	Rick Rubin	2006	
"Feasting on the Flowers"	Anthony Kiedis; Flea; Chad Smith; Josh Klinghoffer; Brian Burton	The Getaway	Danger Mouse	2016	
"Fela's Cock"	Anthony Kiedis; Flea; Chad Smith; John Frusciante	B-side of "Breaking the Girl"	Rick Rubin	1992	
"Fight Like a Brave"	Anthony Kiedis; Flea; Hillel Slovak; Jack Irons	The Uplift Mofo Party Plan	Michael Beinhorn	1987	
"Fire" (Jimi Hendrix cover)	Jimi Hendrix ‡	Mother's Milk	Michael Beinhorn	1989	
"Flea Fly"	Anthony Kiedis; Flea; Hillel Slovak; Jack Irons	Out in L.A.	Red Hot Chili Peppers	1994	
"Flea's Trumpet Treated by John" #	Flea ‡	Live in Hyde Park	Red Hot Chili Peppers	2004	
"Fortune Faded"	Anthony Kiedis; Flea; Chad Smith; John Frusciante	Greatest Hits	Rick Rubin	2003	
"Freaky Styley"	Anthony Kiedis; Flea; Cliff Martinez; Jack Sherman	Freaky Styley	George Clinton	1985	
"F.U." # (Thelonious Monk cover)	Thelonious Monk ‡	Out in L.A.	Michael Beinhorn	1994	
"Funky Crime"	Anthony Kiedis; Flea; Hillel Slovak; Jack Irons	The Uplift Mofo Party Plan	Michael Beinhorn	1987	
"Funky Monks"	Anthony Kiedis; Flea; Chad Smith; John Frusciante	Blood Sugar Sex Magik	Rick Rubin	1991	
"Funny Face"	Anthony Kiedis; Flea; Chad Smith; John Frusciante	B-side of "Snow (Hey Oh)" (CD2)	Rick Rubin	2006	
"Get on Top"	Anthony Kiedis; Flea; Chad Smith; John Frusciante	Californication	Rick Rubin	1999	
"Get Up and Jump"	Flea; Anthony Kiedis	The Red Hot Chili Peppers	Andy Gill	1984	
"The Getaway"	Anthony Kiedis; Flea; Chad Smith; Josh Klinghoffer; Brian Burton	The Getaway	Danger Mouse	2016	
"Give It Away"	Anthony Kiedis; Flea; Chad Smith; John Frusciante	Blood Sugar Sex Magik	Rick Rubin	1991	
"Go Robot"	Anthony Kiedis; Flea; Chad Smith; Josh Klinghoffer	The Getaway	Danger Mouse	2016	
"Gong Li"	Anthony Kiedis; Flea; Chad Smith; John Frusciante	B-side of "Scar Tissue"	Rick Rubin	1999	
"Good Time Boys"	Anthony Kiedis; Flea; Chad Smith; John Frusciante	Mother's Milk	Michael Beinhorn	1989	
"Goodbye Angels"	Anthony Kiedis; Flea; Chad Smith; Josh Klinghoffer	The Getaway	Danger Mouse	2016	
"Goodbye Hooray"	Anthony Kiedis; Flea; Chad Smith; Josh Klinghoffer	I'm with You	Rick Rubin	2011	
"Grand Pappy du Plenty"	Flea; Anthony Kiedis; Jack Sherman; Cliff Martinez; Andy Gill	The Red Hot Chili Peppers	Andy Gill	1984	
"The Great Apes"	Anthony Kiedis; Flea; Chad Smith; John Frusciante	Unlimited Love	Rick Rubin	2022	
"Green Heaven"	Flea; Anthony Kiedis	The Red Hot Chili Peppers	Andy Gill	1984	
"The Greeting Song"	Anthony Kiedis; Flea; Chad Smith; John Frusciante	Blood Sugar Sex Magik	Rick Rubin	1991	
"Hanalei"	Anthony Kiedis; Flea; Chad Smith; Josh Klinghoffer	I'm with You Sessions	Rick Rubin	2013	
"Handful"	Anthony Kiedis; Flea; Chad Smith; John Frusciante	Return of the Dream Canteen	Rick Rubin	2022	
"Happiness Loves Company"	Anthony Kiedis; Flea; Chad Smith; Josh Klinghoffer	I'm with You	Rick Rubin	2011	
"Hard to Concentrate"	Anthony Kiedis; Flea; Chad Smith; John Frusciante	Stadium Arcadium	Rick Rubin	2006	
"Havana Affair" (Note: Later released on Rock & Roll Hall of Fame Covers EP (2012)) (Ramones cover)	Dee Dee Ramone; Johnny Ramone ‡	We're a Happy Family: A Tribute to Ramones	Johnny Ramone; Rob Zombie	2003	
"The Heavy Wing"	Anthony Kiedis; Flea; Chad Smith; John Frusciante	Unlimited Love	Rick Rubin	2022	
"Here Ever After"	Anthony Kiedis; Flea; Chad Smith; John Frusciante	Unlimited Love	Rick Rubin	2022	
"Hey"	Anthony Kiedis; Flea; Chad Smith; John Frusciante	Stadium Arcadium	Rick Rubin	2006	
"Higher Ground" (Stevie Wonder cover)	Stevie Wonder ‡	Mother's Milk	Michael Beinhorn	1989	
"Hollywood (Africa)" (The Meters cover)	Ziggy Modeliste; Art Neville; Leo Nocentelli; George Porter Jr. ‡	Freaky Styley	George Clinton	1985	
"Hometown Gypsy"	Anthony Kiedis; Flea; Chad Smith; Josh Klinghoffer	I'm with You Sessions	Rick Rubin	2012	
"How It Ends"	Anthony Kiedis; Flea; Chad Smith; Josh Klinghoffer	I'm with You Sessions	Rick Rubin	2013	
"How Strong"	Anthony Kiedis; Flea; Chad Smith; John Frusciante	B-side of "Otherside"	Rick Rubin	2000	
"Hump de Bump"	Anthony Kiedis; Flea; Chad Smith; John Frusciante	Stadium Arcadium	Rick Rubin	2006	
"The Hunter"	Anthony Kiedis; Flea; Chad Smith; Josh Klinghoffer; Brian Burton	The Getaway	Danger Mouse	2016	
"I Could Die for You"	Anthony Kiedis; Flea; Chad Smith; John Frusciante	By the Way	Rick Rubin	2002	
"I Could Have Lied"	Anthony Kiedis; Flea; Chad Smith; John Frusciante	Blood Sugar Sex Magik	Rick Rubin	1991	
"I Feel Love" # (Donna Summer cover)	Donna Summer; Giorgio Moroder; Pete Bellotte ‡	Live in Hyde Park	Red Hot Chili Peppers	2004	
"I Found Out" (John Lennon cover)	John Lennon ‡	Working Class Hero: A Tribute to John Lennon	Rick Rubin	1995	
"I Get Around" # (The Beach Boys cover)	Brian Wilson; Mike Love ‡	Rock & Roll Hall of Fame Covers EP	Rick Rubin	2012	
"I Just Want to Have Something to Do" # (Ramones cover)	Ramones ‡	The Bridge School Collection, Vol.1	Red Hot Chili Peppers	2006	
"I Like Dirt"	Anthony Kiedis; Flea; Chad Smith; John Frusciante	Californication	Rick Rubin	1999	
"I'll Be Your Domino"	Anthony Kiedis; Flea; Chad Smith; John Frusciante	B-side of "Snow (Hey Oh)" (CD2)	Rick Rubin	2006	
"If"	Anthony Kiedis; Flea; Chad Smith; John Frusciante	Stadium Arcadium	Rick Rubin	2006	
"If You Have to Ask"	Anthony Kiedis; Flea; Chad Smith; John Frusciante	Blood Sugar Sex Magik	Rick Rubin	1991	
"If You Want Me to Stay" (Sly and the Family Stone cover)	Sylvester Stewart ‡	Freaky Styley	George Clinton	1985	
"In Love Dying" (Note: Released in two parts)	Anthony Kiedis; Flea; Chad Smith; Josh Klinghoffer	I'm with You Sessions	Rick Rubin	2013	
"In the Snow"	Anthony Kiedis; Flea; Chad Smith; John Frusciante	Return of the Dream Canteen	Rick Rubin	2022	
"Instrumental #1"	Anthony Kiedis; Flea; Chad Smith; John Frusciante	B-side of "Scar Tissue"	Rick Rubin	1999	
"Instrumental #2"	Anthony Kiedis; Flea; Chad Smith; John Frusciante	Californication (Australian edition)	Rick Rubin	1999	
"It's Only Natural"	Anthony Kiedis; Flea; Chad Smith; John Frusciante	Unlimited Love	Rick Rubin	2022	
"Joe"	Anthony Kiedis; Flea; Chad Smith; John Frusciante	B-side of "Desecration Smile" (CD2) and "Hump de Bump"	Rick Rubin	2007	
"Johnny, Kick a Hole in the Sky"	Anthony Kiedis; Flea; Chad Smith; John Frusciante	Mother's Milk	Michael Beinhorn	1989	
"Jungle Man"	Anthony Kiedis; Flea; Cliff Martinez; Jack Sherman	Freaky Styley	George Clinton	1985	
"Knock Me Down"	Anthony Kiedis; Flea; Chad Smith; John Frusciante	Mother's Milk	Michael Beinhorn	1989	
"La La La La La La La La"	Anthony Kiedis; Flea; Chad Smith; John Frusciante	Return of the Dream Canteen	Rick Rubin	2022	
"Lately"	Anthony Kiedis; Flea; Chad Smith; John Frusciante	B-side of "Dani California" (CD2)	Rick Rubin	2006	
"Let 'Em Cry"	Anthony Kiedis; Flea; Chad Smith; John Frusciante	Unlimited Love	Rick Rubin	2022	
"Let's Make Evil"	Anthony Kiedis; Flea; Chad Smith; Dave Navarro	B-side of "My Friends"	Rick Rubin	1995	
"Leverage of Space" #	Anthony Kiedis; Flea; Chad Smith; John Frusciante	Live in Hyde Park	Red Hot Chili Peppers	2004	
"Little Miss Lover" (Jimi Hendrix cover)	Jimi Hendrix ‡	Blood Sugar Sex Magik (deluxe edition)	Rick Rubin	2006	
"Look Around"	Anthony Kiedis; Flea; Chad Smith; Josh Klinghoffer	I'm with You	Rick Rubin	2011	
"Long Progression"	Anthony Kiedis; Flea; Chad Smith; Josh Klinghoffer	I'm with You Sessions	Rick Rubin	2012	
"The Longest Wave"	Anthony Kiedis; Flea; Chad Smith; Josh Klinghoffer	The Getaway	Danger Mouse	2016	
"Love of Your Life"	Anthony Kiedis; Flea; Chad Smith; Josh Klinghoffer	I'm with You Sessions	Rick Rubin	2012	
"Love Rollercoaster" (Ohio Players cover)	James Williams; Clarence Satchell; Leroy Bonner; Marshall Jones; Ralph Middlebrooks; Marvin Pierce; William Beck ‡	Beavis and Butt-Head Do America (soundtrack)	Sylvia Massy; Red Hot Chili Peppers	1996	
"Love Trilogy"	Anthony Kiedis; Flea; Hillel Slovak; Jack Irons	The Uplift Mofo Party Plan	Michael Beinhorn	1987	
"Lovin' and Touchin'"	Anthony Kiedis; Flea; Cliff Martinez; Jack Sherman	Freaky Styley	George Clinton	1985	
"Lyon 6.6.06" #	Anthony Kiedis; Flea; Chad Smith; John Frusciante	B-side of "Tell Me Baby" (CD2)	Rick Rubin	2006	
"Make You Feel Better"	Anthony Kiedis; Flea; Chad Smith; John Frusciante	Stadium Arcadium	Rick Rubin	2006	
"Magic Johnson"	Anthony Kiedis; Flea; Chad Smith; John Frusciante	Mother's Milk	Michael Beinhorn	1989	
"Magpies on Fire"	Anthony Kiedis; Flea; Chad Smith; Josh Klinghoffer	I'm with You Sessions	Rick Rubin	2012	
"Me and My Friends"	Anthony Kiedis; Flea; Hillel Slovak; Jack Irons	The Uplift Mofo Party Plan	Michael Beinhorn	1987	
"Meet Me at the Corner"	Anthony Kiedis; Flea; Chad Smith; Josh Klinghoffer	I'm with You	Rick Rubin	2011	
"Mellowship Slinky in B Major"	Anthony Kiedis; Flea; Chad Smith; John Frusciante	Blood Sugar Sex Magik	Rick Rubin	1991	
"Melancholy Mechanics"	Anthony Kiedis; Flea; Chad Smith; Dave Navarro	B-side of "Warped"	Rick Rubin	1995	
"Mercy Mercy"	Anthony Kiedis; Flea; Chad Smith; John Frusciante	B-side of "Tell Me Baby" (CD2)	Rick Rubin	2006	
"Midnight"	Anthony Kiedis; Flea; Chad Smith; John Frusciante	By the Way	Rick Rubin	2002	
"Million Miles of Water"	Anthony Kiedis; Flea; Chad Smith; John Frusciante	B-side of "Dani California" (CD1)	Rick Rubin	2006	
"Millionaires Against Hunger"	Anthony Kiedis; Flea; Chad Smith; John Frusciante	B-side of "Higher Ground"	Michael Beinhorn	1989	
"Mini-Epic (Kill for Your Country)" #	Anthony Kiedis; Flea; Chad Smith; John Frusciante	Cardiff, Wales: 6/23/04	Dave Rat	2015	
"Minor Thing"	Anthony Kiedis; Flea; Chad Smith; John Frusciante	By the Way	Rick Rubin	2002	
"Mommy Where's Daddy?"	Flea; Anthony Kiedis; Jack Sherman; Cliff Martinez	The Red Hot Chili Peppers	Andy Gill	1984	
"Monarchy of Roses"	Anthony Kiedis; Flea; Chad Smith; Josh Klinghoffer	I'm with You	Rick Rubin	2011	
"My Cigarette"	Anthony Kiedis; Flea; Chad Smith; John Frusciante	Return of the Dream Canteen	Rick Rubin	2022	
"My Friends"	Anthony Kiedis; Flea; Chad Smith; Dave Navarro	One Hot Minute	Rick Rubin	1995	
"My Lovely Man"	Anthony Kiedis; Flea; Chad Smith; John Frusciante	Blood Sugar Sex Magik	Rick Rubin	1991	
"Naked in the Rain"	Anthony Kiedis; Flea; Chad Smith; John Frusciante	Blood Sugar Sex Magik	Rick Rubin	1991	
"Nerve Flip"	Anthony Kiedis; Flea; Chad Smith; John Frusciante	Unlimited Love (Japanese bonus track)	Rick Rubin	2022	
"Never Is a Long Time"	Anthony Kiedis; Flea; Chad Smith; Josh Klinghoffer	I'm with You Sessions	Rick Rubin	2012	
"Nevermind"	Anthony Kiedis; Flea; Hillel Slovak; Jack Irons	Freaky Styley	George Clinton	1985	
"No Chump Love Sucker"	Anthony Kiedis; Flea; Hillel Slovak; Jack Irons	The Uplift Mofo Party Plan	Michael Beinhorn	1987	
"Nobody Weird Like Me"	Anthony Kiedis; Flea; Chad Smith; John Frusciante	Mother's Milk	Michael Beinhorn	1989	
"Not the One"	Anthony Kiedis; Flea; Chad Smith; John Frusciante	Unlimited Love	Rick Rubin	2022	
"Nothing to Lose" #	Anthony Kiedis; Flea; Chad Smith; John Frusciante	B-side of "Can't Stop" (CD2)	Rick Rubin	2003	
"On Mercury"	Anthony Kiedis; Flea; Chad Smith; John Frusciante	By the Way	Rick Rubin	2002	
"One Big Mob"	Anthony Kiedis; Flea; Chad Smith; Dave Navarro	One Hot Minute	Rick Rubin	1995	
"One Hot Minute"	Anthony Kiedis; Flea; Chad Smith; Dave Navarro	One Hot Minute	Rick Rubin	1995	
"One Way Traffic"	Anthony Kiedis; Flea; Chad Smith; John Frusciante	Unlimited Love	Rick Rubin	2022	
"Open/Close"	Anthony Kiedis; Flea; Chad Smith; Josh Klinghoffer	I'm with You Sessions	Rick Rubin	2013	
"Organic Anti-Beat Box Band"	Anthony Kiedis; Flea; Hillel Slovak; Jack Irons	The Uplift Mofo Party Plan	Michael Beinhorn	1987	
"Otherside"	Anthony Kiedis; Flea; Chad Smith; John Frusciante	Californication	Rick Rubin	1999	
"Out in L.A."	Flea; Anthony Kiedis	The Red Hot Chili Peppers	Andy Gill	1984	
"Out of Range"	Anthony Kiedis; Flea; Chad Smith; John Frusciante	B-side of "The Zephyr Song" (CD2)	Rick Rubin	2002	
"Over Funk"	Anthony Kiedis; Flea; Chad Smith; John Frusciante	Californication (deluxe edition)	Rick Rubin	2006	
"Parallel Universe"	Anthony Kiedis; Flea; Chad Smith; John Frusciante	Californication	Rick Rubin	1999	
"Party on Your Pussy" (a.k.a. "Special Secret Song Inside")	Anthony Kiedis; Flea; Hillel Slovak; Jack Irons	The Uplift Mofo Party Plan	Michael Beinhorn	1987	
"Peace and Love"	Anthony Kiedis; Flea; Chad Smith; John Frusciante	Return of the Dream Canteen	Rick Rubin	2022	
"Permutation" #	Anthony Kiedis; Flea; Chad Smith; John Frusciante	B-side of "Snow (Hey Oh)" (CD1)	Rick Rubin	2006	
"Pink as Floyd"	Anthony Kiedis; Flea; Chad Smith; Josh Klinghoffer	I'm with You Sessions	Rick Rubin	2013	
"Pea"	Anthony Kiedis; Flea; Chad Smith; Dave Navarro	One Hot Minute	Rick Rubin	1995	
"Police Helicopter"	Flea; Anthony Kiedis	The Red Hot Chili Peppers	Andy Gill	1984	
"Police Station"	Anthony Kiedis; Flea; Chad Smith; Josh Klinghoffer	I'm with You	Rick Rubin	2011	
"Politician (Mini Rap)"	Anthony Kiedis; Flea; Chad Smith; John Frusciante	B-side of "Higher Ground"	Michael Beinhorn	1989	
"Porcelain"	Anthony Kiedis; Flea; Chad Smith; John Frusciante	Californication	Rick Rubin	1999	
"Poster Child"	Anthony Kiedis; Flea; Chad Smith; John Frusciante	Unlimited Love	Rick Rubin	2022	
"The Power of Equality"	Anthony Kiedis; Flea; Chad Smith; John Frusciante	Blood Sugar Sex Magik	Rick Rubin	1991	
"Pretty Little Ditty"	Anthony Kiedis; Flea; John Frusciante; Chad Smith	Mother's Milk	Michael Beinhorn	1989	
"Punk Rock Classic"	Anthony Kiedis; Flea; Chad Smith; John Frusciante	Mother's Milk	Michael Beinhorn	1989	
"Purple Stain"	Anthony Kiedis; Flea; Chad Smith; John Frusciante	Californication	Rick Rubin	1999	
"Quixoticelixer"	Anthony Kiedis; Flea; Chad Smith; John Frusciante	Californication (deluxe edition)	Rick Rubin	2006	
"Reach Out"	Anthony Kiedis; Flea; Chad Smith; John Frusciante	Return of the Dream Canteen	Rick Rubin	2022	
"Readymade"	Anthony Kiedis; Flea; Chad Smith; John Frusciante	Stadium Arcadium	Rick Rubin	2006	
"Right on Time"	Anthony Kiedis; Flea; Chad Smith; John Frusciante	Californication	Rick Rubin	1999	
"The Righteous & the Wicked"	Anthony Kiedis; Flea; Chad Smith; John Frusciante	Blood Sugar Sex Magik	Rick Rubin	1991	
"Rivers of Avalon"	Anthony Kiedis; Flea; Chad Smith; John Frusciante	B-side of "The Zephyr Song" (CD2)	Rick Rubin	2002	
"Road Trippin'"	Anthony Kiedis; Flea; Chad Smith; John Frusciante	Californication	Rick Rubin	1999	
"Rolling Sly Stone" #	Anthony Kiedis; Flea; Chad Smith; John Frusciante	Live in Hyde Park	Red Hot Chili Peppers	2004	
"Roulette"	Anthony Kiedis; Flea; Chad Smith; John Frusciante	Return of the Dream Canteen	Rick Rubin	2022	
"Runaway"	Anthony Kiedis; Flea; Chad Smith; John Frusciante	By the Way (deluxe edition)	Rick Rubin	2006	
"Salute to Kareem" (demo)	Anthony Kiedis; Flea; Chad Smith; John Frusciante	Mother's Milk (2003 remastered edition)	Michael Beinhorn	2003	
"Save the Population"	Anthony Kiedis; Flea; Chad Smith; John Frusciante	Greatest Hits	Rick Rubin	2003	
"Save This Lady"	Anthony Kiedis; Flea; Chad Smith; John Frusciante	B-side of "Desecration Smile" (CD1) and "Hump de Bump"	Rick Rubin	2007	
"Savior"	Anthony Kiedis; Flea; Chad Smith; John Frusciante	Californication	Rick Rubin	1999	
"Scar Tissue"	Anthony Kiedis; Flea; Chad Smith; John Frusciante	Californication	Rick Rubin	1999	
"Search and Destroy" (The Stooges cover)	Iggy Pop; James Williamson ‡	B-side of "Give It Away"	Rick Rubin	1991	
"Sex Rap"	Anthony Kiedis; Flea; Hillel Slovak; Jack Irons	Freaky Styley	George Clinton	1985	
"Sexy Mexican Maid"	Anthony Kiedis; Flea; John Frusciante; D. H. Peligro	Mother's Milk	Michael Beinhorn	1989	
"Shallow Be Thy Game"	Anthony Kiedis; Flea; Chad Smith; Dave Navarro	One Hot Minute	Rick Rubin	1995	
"The Shape I'm Takin'"	Anthony Kiedis; Flea; Chad Smith; John Frusciante	Return of the Dream Canteen (Japanese CD bonus track)	Rick Rubin	2022	
"She Looks to Me"	Anthony Kiedis; Flea; Chad Smith; John Frusciante	Stadium Arcadium	Rick Rubin	2006	
"She's a Lover"	Anthony Kiedis; Flea; Chad Smith; John Frusciante	Unlimited Love	Rick Rubin	2022	
"She's Only 18"	Anthony Kiedis; Flea; Chad Smith; John Frusciante	Stadium Arcadium	Rick Rubin	2006	
"Shoot Me a Smile"	Anthony Kiedis; Flea; Chad Smith; John Frusciante	Return of the Dream Canteen	Rick Rubin	2022	
"Show Me Your Soul"	Anthony Kiedis; Flea; Chad Smith; John Frusciante	Pretty Woman (soundtrack)	John Norwood Fisher; Red Hot Chili Peppers	1990	
"Sick Love"	Anthony Kiedis; Flea; Chad Smith; Josh Klinghoffer; Elton John; Bernie Taupin	The Getaway	Danger Mouse	2016	
"Sikamikanico"	Anthony Kiedis; Flea; Chad Smith; John Frusciante	B-side of "Under the Bridge"	Rick Rubin	1992	
"Sir Psycho Sexy"	Anthony Kiedis; Flea; Chad Smith; John Frusciante	Blood Sugar Sex Magik	Rick Rubin	1991	
"Skinny Sweaty Man"	Anthony Kiedis; Flea; Hillel Slovak; Jack Irons	The Uplift Mofo Party Plan	Michael Beinhorn	1987	
"Slow Cheetah"	Anthony Kiedis; Flea; Chad Smith; John Frusciante	Stadium Arcadium	Rick Rubin	2006	
"Slowly Deeply"	Anthony Kiedis; Flea; Chad Smith; John Frusciante	B-side of "Universally Speaking"	Rick Rubin	2002	
"Snow (Hey Oh)"	Anthony Kiedis; Flea; Chad Smith; John Frusciante	Stadium Arcadium	Rick Rubin	2006	
"So Much I"	Anthony Kiedis; Flea; Chad Smith; John Frusciante	Stadium Arcadium	Rick Rubin	2006	
"Someone"	Anthony Kiedis; Flea; Chad Smith; John Frusciante	B-side of "The Zephyr Song" (CD1)	Rick Rubin	2002	
"Song That Made Us What We Are Today" (demo)	Anthony Kiedis; Flea; Chad Smith; John Frusciante	Mother's Milk (2003 remastered edition)	Michael Beinhorn	2003	
"Soul to Squeeze"	Anthony Kiedis; Flea; Chad Smith; John Frusciante	Coneheads (soundtrack)	Rick Rubin	1993	
"Stadium Arcadium"	Anthony Kiedis; Flea; Chad Smith; John Frusciante	Stadium Arcadium	Rick Rubin	2006	
"Stone Cold Bush"	Anthony Kiedis; Flea; John Frusciante; D. H. Peligro	Mother's Milk	Michael Beinhorn	1989	
"Storm in a Teacup"	Anthony Kiedis; Flea; Chad Smith; John Frusciante	Stadium Arcadium	Rick Rubin	2006	
"Stranded"	Anthony Kiedis; Flea; Hillel Slovak; Jack Irons	Out in L.A.	Red Hot Chili Peppers	1994	
"Strange Man"	Anthony Kiedis; Flea; Chad Smith; Josh Klinghoffer	I'm with You Sessions	Rick Rubin	2012	
"Stretch"	Anthony Kiedis; Flea; Chad Smith; Dave Navarro	B-side of "My Friends"	Rick Rubin	1995	
"Strip My Mind"	Anthony Kiedis; Flea; Chad Smith; John Frusciante	Stadium Arcadium	Rick Rubin	2006	
"Subterranean Homesick Blues" (Bob Dylan cover)	Bob Dylan ‡	The Uplift Mofo Party Plan	Michael Beinhorn	1987	
"Subway to Venus"	Anthony Kiedis; Flea; Chad Smith; John Frusciante	Mother's Milk	Michael Beinhorn	1989	
"Suck My Kiss"	Anthony Kiedis; Flea; Chad Smith; John Frusciante	Blood Sugar Sex Magik	Rick Rubin	1991	
"Suffragette City" # (David Bowie cover)	David Bowie ‡	B-side of "Aeroplane" (limited edition single)	Rick Rubin	1995	
"The Sunset Sleeps"	Anthony Kiedis; Flea; Chad Smith; Josh Klinghoffer	I'm with You Sessions	Rick Rubin	2012	
"Tangelo"	Anthony Kiedis; Flea; Chad Smith; John Frusciante	Unlimited Love	Rick Rubin	2022	
"Taste the Pain"	Anthony Kiedis; Flea; John Frusciante; D. H. Peligro	Mother's Milk	Michael Beinhorn	1989	
"Tear"	Anthony Kiedis; Flea; Chad Smith; John Frusciante	By the Way	Rick Rubin	2002	
"Tearjerker"	Anthony Kiedis; Flea; Chad Smith; Dave Navarro	One Hot Minute	Rick Rubin	1995	
"Teatro Jam"	Anthony Kiedis; Flea; Chad Smith; John Frusciante	B-side of "Around the World" (CD1)	Rick Rubin	1999	
"Teenager in Love" (Dion and the Belmonts cover)	Doc Pomus; Mort Shuman ‡	B-side of "By the Way"	John Frusciante	2002	
"Tell Me Baby"	Anthony Kiedis; Flea; Chad Smith; John Frusciante	Stadium Arcadium	Rick Rubin	2006	
"These Are the Ways"	Anthony Kiedis; Flea; Chad Smith; John Frusciante	Unlimited Love	Rick Rubin	2022	
"They're Red Hot" (Robert Johnson cover)	Robert Johnson ‡	Blood Sugar Sex Magik	Rick Rubin	1991	
"Thirty Dirty Birds"	Anthony Kiedis; Flea; Cliff Martinez; Hillel Slovak	Freaky Styley	George Clinton	1985	
"This Is the Kitt"	Anthony Kiedis; Flea; Chad Smith; Josh Klinghoffer	I'm with You Sessions	Rick Rubin	2013	
"This Is the Place"	Anthony Kiedis; Flea; Chad Smith; John Frusciante	By the Way	Rick Rubin	2002	
"This Velvet Glove"	Anthony Kiedis; Flea; Chad Smith; John Frusciante	Californication	Rick Rubin	1999	
"This Ticonderoga"	Anthony Kiedis; Flea; Chad Smith; Josh Klinghoffer	The Getaway	Danger Mouse	2016	
"Throw Away your Television"	Anthony Kiedis; Flea; Chad Smith; John Frusciante	By the Way	Rick Rubin	2002	
"Time"	Anthony Kiedis; Flea; Chad Smith; John Frusciante	B-side of "By the Way"	Rick Rubin	2002	
"Tiny Dancer" # (Elton John cover)	Elton John; Bernie Taupin ‡	Under the Covers: Essential Red Hot Chili Peppers	Red Hot Chili Peppers	1998	
"Tippa My Tongue"	Anthony Kiedis; Flea; Chad Smith; John Frusciante	Return of the Dream Canteen	Rick Rubin	2022	
"Torture Me"	Anthony Kiedis; Flea; Chad Smith; John Frusciante	Stadium Arcadium	Rick Rubin	2006	
"Transcending"	Anthony Kiedis; Flea; Chad Smith; Dave Navarro	One Hot Minute	Rick Rubin	1995	
"True Men Don't Kill Coyotes"	Flea; Anthony Kiedis; Jack Sherman; Cliff Martinez	The Red Hot Chili Peppers	Andy Gill	1984	
"Tuesday Night in Berlin" #	Anthony Kiedis; Flea; Chad Smith; John Frusciante	B-side of "Fortune Faded" (CD2)	Rick Rubin	2003	
"Turn It Again"	Anthony Kiedis; Flea; Chad Smith; John Frusciante	Stadium Arcadium	Rick Rubin	2006	
"Under the Bridge"	Anthony Kiedis; Flea; Chad Smith; John Frusciante	Blood Sugar Sex Magik	Rick Rubin	1991	
"Universally Speaking"	Anthony Kiedis; Flea; Chad Smith; John Frusciante	By the Way	Rick Rubin	2002	
"Venice Queen"	Anthony Kiedis; Flea; Chad Smith; John Frusciante	By the Way	Rick Rubin	2002	
"Veronica"	Anthony Kiedis; Flea; Chad Smith; John Frusciante	Unlimited Love	Rick Rubin	2022	
"Victorian Machinery"	Anthony Kiedis; Flea; Chad Smith; Josh Klinghoffer	I'm with You Sessions	Rick Rubin	2013	
"Walkabout"	Anthony Kiedis; Flea; Chad Smith; Dave Navarro	One Hot Minute	Rick Rubin	1995	
"Walkin' on Down the Road"	Anthony Kiedis; Flea; Hillel Slovak; Jack Irons; Cliff Martinez	The Uplift Mofo Party Plan	Michael Beinhorn	1987	
"Warlocks"	Anthony Kiedis; Flea; Chad Smith; John Frusciante	Stadium Arcadium	Rick Rubin	2006	
"Warm Tape"	Anthony Kiedis; Flea; Chad Smith; John Frusciante	By the Way	Rick Rubin	2002	
"Warped"	Anthony Kiedis; Flea; Chad Smith; Dave Navarro	One Hot Minute	Rick Rubin	1995	
"We Believe"	Anthony Kiedis; Flea; Chad Smith; John Frusciante	Stadium Arcadium	Rick Rubin	2006	
"We Turn Red"	Anthony Kiedis; Flea; Chad Smith; Josh Klinghoffer; Brian Burton	The Getaway	Danger Mouse	2016	
"Wet Sand"	Anthony Kiedis; Flea; Chad Smith; John Frusciante	Stadium Arcadium	Rick Rubin	2006	
"What Is Soul?" # (Funkadelic cover)	George Clinton ‡	B-side of "By the Way" (CD2)	Rick Rubin	2002	
"What It Is"	Anthony Kiedis; Flea; Hillel Slovak; Jack Irons	Out in L.A.	Red Hot Chili Peppers	1994	
"Whatchu Thinkin'"	Anthony Kiedis; Flea; Chad Smith; John Frusciante	Unlimited Love	Rick Rubin	2022	
"Whatever We Want"	Anthony Kiedis; Flea; Chad Smith; John Frusciante	B-side of "Dani California" (CD2)	Rick Rubin	2006	
"White Braids & Pillow Chair"	Anthony Kiedis; Flea; Chad Smith; John Frusciante	Unlimited Love	Rick Rubin	2022	
"Why Don't You Love Me" (Hank Williams cover)	Hank Williams ‡	The Red Hot Chili Peppers	Andy Gill	1984	
"Yertle the Turtle"	Dr. Seuss ‡	Freaky Styley	George Clinton	1985	
"Yertle Trilogy" #	Various ‡	B-side of "Around the World" (CD2)	Rick Rubin	1999	
"You Always Sing the Same"	Flea	The Red Hot Chili Peppers	Andy Gill	1984	
"Your Eyes Girl"	Anthony Kiedis; Flea; Chad Smith; Josh Klinghoffer	I'm with You Sessions	Rick Rubin	2013	
"The Zephyr Song"	Anthony Kiedis; Flea; Chad Smith; John Frusciante	By the Way	Rick Rubin	2002	

== Bibliography ==
- Kiedis, Anthony; Sloman, Larry (October 6, 2004). Scar Tissue. Hyperion. ISBN 1-4013-0101-0.
- Mullen, Brendan (October 19, 2010). An Oral/Visual History by the Red Hot Chili Peppers. Los Angeles, California: It Books. ISBN 978-0-06-135191-4.
