= Stadium Arcadium World Tour =

2006–07 concert tour by Red Hot Chili Peppers

- Tour by Red Hot Chili Peppers
- Promotional poster for the tour
- Associated album: Stadium Arcadium
- Start date: May 30, 2006
- End date: August 26, 2007
- Legs: 6
- No. of shows: 132

Red Hot Chili Peppers concert chronology
- Roll on the Red Tour (2004); Stadium Arcadium World Tour (2006–2007); I'm with You World Tour (2011–2013)

The Stadium Arcadium World Tour (also known as The Intergalactic Tour) was a 2006–2007 concert tour by the band Red Hot Chili Peppers in support of their ninth studio album, Stadium Arcadium. The band started out with a pre-tour promotional leg of dates around the world while the world tour was composed of six legs, three in Europe, one in Australia, New Zealand and Asia, and the other two in the US and Canada.

The tour was the last until 2022's Global Stadium Tour to feature guitarist John Frusciante, who confirmed his departure from the band in 2009, but later rejoined in 2019. Frusciante was replaced in the band by longtime friend and musical partner, Josh Klinghoffer, who was a backing musician for the Peppers in 2007 on the final legs of the Stadium Arcadium tour, serving as an additional guitarist, backing vocalist, and performing keyboard parts. Adding an extra guitarist for the first time to their touring lineup gave the band a chance to perform songs that they were otherwise unable to play with just one guitarist.

== Tour overview ==
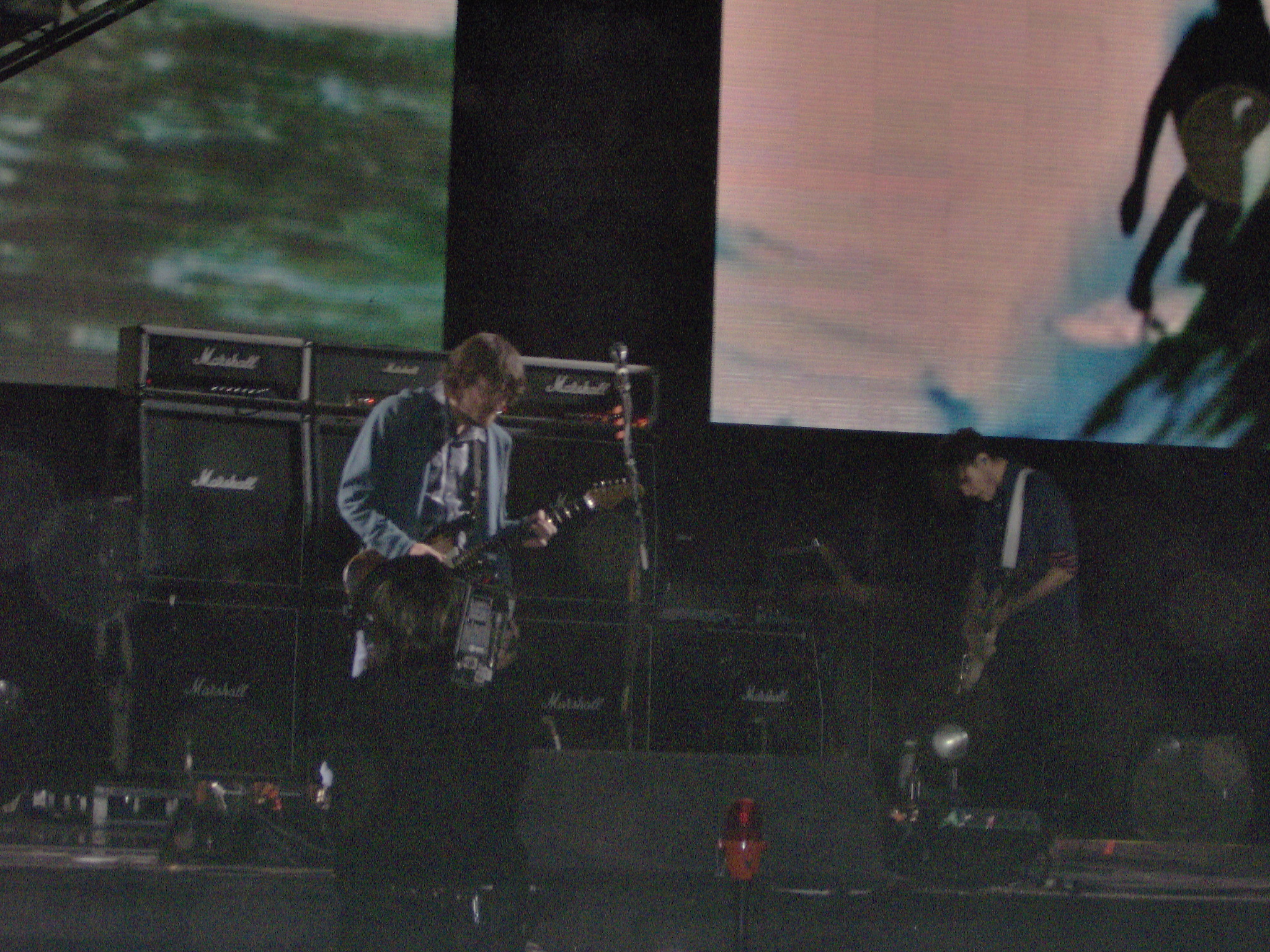
The August 26, 2007 show at the Leeds Festival (pictured) was the last show of the Red Hot Chili Peppers with John Frusciante (left) until 2020. The band's live performances from 2010 to 2019 had Josh Klinghoffer (right), a backing musician on this tour, taking Frusciante's place.

Most shows started with an opening jam by John Frusciante and the band before the signature riff of "Can't Stop" signalled Anthony Kiedis' arrival on stage. The rest of the songs changed with each venue; however, "Charlie" and "Dani California" were usually played as the second or third songs. The set list consisted mainly of songs from the new album, Stadium Arcadium and the previous two albums, By the Way and Californication. Singles such as "Tell Me Baby", "Snow ((Hey Oh))" and "Hump de Bump" were core numbers. The band also incorporated several acoustic numbers from the recent release and the back catalogue, which gave the show both a fast and slow pace. Some of the band's more popular singles that were played often on the previous tours such as "Around The World", "Parallel Universe" and "Suck My Kiss" were rarely played. The encore of the show usually consisted of "Californication" along with a classic Red Hot Chili Peppers anthem, such as "Give It Away" or "Higher Ground", one of the band's more popular songs from the 1980s which was added to the setlist on the tour's final legs and performed for the first time since the Californication tour. "Higher Ground" was one of only two songs from Mother's Milk played on the entire tour with the other being "Nobody Weird Like Me". The band also played "Funky Monks" twice on this tour, their first and last performance leading this tour was in 1991. Two songs from Freaky Styley, "Catholic School Girls Rule" and "Sex Rap" were performed for the first time in over 15 years. The tour also marked the first time since 1991 that two of the Peppers' biggest and best known singles, "Give It Away" and "Under the Bridge", were not included in all performances leaving some fans at certain shows upset that one if not both of the songs were left out of the setlist. Of the album's 28 songs and 10 B-sides, only 20 songs have been played live in any capacity, none of which were B-sides, and "Hard to Concentrate" was not played live until the band's I'm With You tour.

This tour marked the last time "21st Century", "Catholic School Girls Rule", "C'mon Girl", "Desecration Smile", "Funky Monks", "Readymade", "Sex Rap", "So Much I", "Stadium Arcadium", "This Velvet Glove", "Torture Me" and "Warlocks" were played live.

== Songs performed ==
Originals

The Red Hot Chili Peppers

- "Baby Appeal" (tease)
- "Grand Pappy du Plenty" (tease)
- "Police Helicopter" (Flea and Chad jam)

Freaky Styley

- "Catholic School Girls Rule"
- "Freaky Styley"
- "If You Want Me to Stay" (Sly and the Family Stone) (tease)
- "Nevermind" (tease)
- "Sex Rap"

The Uplift Mofo Party Plan

- "Me and My Friends"

Mother's Milk

- "Higher Ground" (Stevie Wonder)
- "Magic Johnson" (tease)
- "Nobody Weird Like Me"

Blood Sugar Sex Magik

- "Apache Rose Peacock" (tease)
- "Blood Sugar Sex Magik"
- "Funky Monks"
- "Give It Away"
- "The Greeting Song" (tease)
- "I Could Have Lied"
- "If You Have to Ask"
- "Sir Psycho Sexy"
- "Suck My Kiss"
- "They're Red Hot" (Robert Johnson)
- "Under the Bridge"
- "The Power of Equality"

One Hot Minute

- "Pea"
- "Warped" (Flea and Chad jam)

Californication

- "Around the World"
- "Californication"
- "Easily" (tease)
- "Emit Remmus"
- "Get on Top"
- "Otherside"
- "Parallel Universe"
- "Purple Stain" (tease)
- "Quixoticelixer" (iTunes bonus track) (tease)
- "Right on Time"
- "Scar Tissue"
- "This Velvet Glove"

By the Way

- "By the Way"
- "Can't Stop"
- "Don't Forget Me"
- "Dosed" (tease)
- "Throw Away Your Television"
- "The Zephyr Song" (tease)

Greatest Hits

- "Fortune Faded"
- "Save the Population" (tease)

Stadium Arcadium

- "21st Century"
- "Charlie"
- "C'mon Girl"
- "Dani California"
- "Desecration Smile"
- "Especially in Michigan" (tease)
- "Hey"
- "Hump de Bump"
- "If" (performed once, without John)
- "Readymade"
- "She's Only 18"
- "Snow ((Hey Oh))"
- "So Much I"
- "Stadium Arcadium"
- "Strip My Mind"
- "Tell Me Baby"
- "Torture Me"
- "Warlocks"
- "Wet Sand"

Other (non-album songs)

- "Bicycle Song" (refrain only – album bonus track)
- "Havana Affair" (The Ramones)
- "Runaway" (Del Shannon)
- "Soul to Squeeze"

Cover songs (used as intros or during jams unless otherwise noted)
- "Blue Sunday" (The Doors)
- "City of New Orleans" (Steve Goodman)
- "Duke of Earl" (Gene Chandler)
- "For Emily, Whenever I May Find Her" (Simon & Garfunkel)
- "Golden Hair" (Syd Barrett)
- "How Can I Tell You" (Cat Stevens)
- "Hard Headed Woman" (Cat Stevens)
- "How Deep Is Your Love?" (The Bee Gees)
- "I Feel Love" (Donna Summer)
- "I'm Eighteen" (Alice Cooper)
- "Jugband Blues" (Pink Floyd)
- "Love Gun" (Kiss)
- "Maybe" (The Chantels)
- "The Metro" (Berlin)
- "The Needle and the Damage Done" (Neil Young)
- "Nervous Breakdown (Black Flag)
- "People Have the Power" (Patti Smith) (once with Patti Smith and without Anthony) (full song)
- "See Emily Play" (Pink Floyd)
- "Shadow Dancing" (Andy Gibb)
- "Smells Like Teen Spirit" (Nirvana)
- "Songbird" (Fleetwood Mac)
- "S.O.S." (ABBA)
- "Sunday Bloody Sunday" (U2)
- "Take It as It Comes" (The Doors)
- "Tiny Dancer" (Elton John)
- "Untitled #3" (John Frusciante)
- "Untitled #11" (John Frusciante)
- "We Will Rock You" (Queen)
- "What Is Soul?" (George Clinton) (full song)
- "Will You Still Love Me Tomorrow?" (The Shirelles)
- "You're Gonna Get Yours" (Public Enemy)
- "Your Pussy's Glued to a Building on Fire" (John Frusciante)

== Tour dates ==
Date	City	Country	Venue	Attendance	Revenue	Opening Acts
Europe
May 30, 2006	Barcelona	Spain	Palau Sant Jordi			
May 31, 2006	Barcelona	Spain	Palau Sant Jordi			
June 2, 2006	Madrid	Spain	Palacio de Deportes			Dizzee Rascal
June 3, 2006	Lisbon	Portugal	Rock In Rio			
June 5, 2006	Landgraaf	Netherlands	Pinkpop Festival			
June 6, 2006	Lyon	France	Halle Tony Garnier			Dizzee Rascal
June 8, 2006	Paris	France	Bercy			Dizzee Rascal
June 9, 2006	Paris	France	Bercy			Dizzee Rascal
June 11, 2006	Dortmund	Germany	Westfalenhalle			
June 12, 2006	Dortmund	Germany	Westfalenhalle			Dizzee Rascal
June 14, 2006	Prague	Czech Republic	Sazka Arena			Dizzee Rascal
June 15, 2006	Berlin	Germany	Kindl-Bühne Wuhlheide			Dizzee Rascal
June 29, 2006	Werchter	Belgium	Rock Werchter			
June 30, 2006	Ipswich	England	Portman Road			!!! Dirty Pretty Things
July 2, 2006	Coventry	England	Ricoh Arena			!!! Dirty Pretty Things
July 3, 2006	Reading	England	Madejski Stadium			!!! Ben Harper & the Innocent Criminals
July 5, 2006	Derby	England	Pride Park			
July 6, 2006	Sheffield	England	Don Valley			
July 8, 2006	Kinross	Scotland	T In The Park			
July 9, 2006	Kildare	Ireland	Oxegen Festival			
July 11, 2006	Manchester	England	MEN Arena			!!!
July 12, 2006	Manchester	England	MEN Arena			!!!
July 14, 2006	London	England	Earls Court			
July 15, 2006	London	England	Earls Court			
July 17, 2006	London	England	Earls Court			!!!
July 18, 2006	London	England	Earls Court			!!!
Japanese leg I
July 28, 2006	Tokyo	Japan	Music Station			
July 29, 2006	Mount Naeba	Japan	Fuji Rock Festival			
North American Leg I
August 6, 2006	Chicago	United States	Lollapalooza			
August 11, 2006	Portland	United States	Rose Garden			The Mars Volta
August 12, 2006	Auburn	United States	White River Amphitheatre			
August 15, 2006	Boise	United States	Taco Bell Arena			The Mars Volta
August 16, 2006	Salt Lake City	United States	Delta Center			The Mars Volta
August 18, 2006	Denver	United States	Pepsi Center			The Mars Volta
August 21, 2006	Glendale	United States	Jobing.com Arena			The Mars Volta
August 22, 2006	San Diego	United States	iPay One Sports Arena			The Mars Volta
August 24, 2006	Oakland	United States	Oakland Arena			The Mars Volta
August 25, 2006	Oakland	United States	Oakland Arena			The Mars Volta
August 27, 2006	Fresno	United States	Selland Arena			The Mars Volta
August 28, 2006	Sacramento	United States	ARCO Arena			The Mars Volta
August 31, 2006	Inglewood	United States	The Forum			The Mars Volta
September 1, 2006	Inglewood	United States	The Forum			The Mars Volta
September 14, 2006	Vancouver	Canada	GM Place			The Mars Volta
September 16, 2006	Calgary	Canada	Pengrowth Saddledome			The Mars Volta
September 17, 2006	Edmonton	Canada	Rexall Place			The Mars Volta
September 19, 2006	Saskatoon	Canada	Credit Union Centre			The Mars Volta
September 20, 2006	Winnipeg	Canada	MTS Centre			The Mars Volta
September 23, 2006	Baltimore	United States	Virgin Festival			
September 25, 2006	Toronto	Canada	Air Canada Centre			The Mars Volta
September 26, 2006	Toronto	Canada	Air Canada Centre			The Mars Volta
September 28, 2006	Montreal	Canada	Bell Centre			The Mars Volta
September 29, 2006	Ottawa	Canada	Scotiabank Place			The Mars Volta
October 1, 2006	Quebec City	Canada	Colisée Pepsi			The Mars Volta
October 2, 2006	Boston	United States	TD BankNorth Garden			The Mars Volta
October 17, 2006	East Rutherford	United States	Continental Airlines Arena	33,615 / 33,615	$2,111,333	The Mars Volta
October 18, 2006	East Rutherford	United States	Continental Airlines Arena	33,615 / 33,615	$2,111,333	The Mars Volta
October 20, 2006	Boston	United States	TD BankNorth Garden			The Mars Volta
October 21, 2006	Albany	United States	Pepsi Arena	12,179 / 12,458	$616,613	The Mars Volta
October 23, 2006	Philadelphia	United States	Wachovia Center	29,258 / 29,258	$1,882,613	The Mars Volta
October 24, 2006	Philadelphia	United States	Wachovia Center	29,258 / 29,258	$1,882,613	The Mars Volta
October 26, 2006	Atlanta	United States	Arena at Gwinnett Center			The Mars Volta
October 28, 2006	New Orleans	United States	Voodoo Music Experience			
October 30, 2006	Columbus	United States	Schottenstein Center			The Mars Volta
October 31, 2006	Cleveland	United States	Quicken Loans Arena			The Mars Volta
November 2, 2006	Grand Rapids	United States	Van Andel Arena			The Mars Volta
November 3, 2006	Auburn Hills	United States	Palace of Auburn Hills			The Mars Volta
November 5, 2006	Saint Paul	United States	Xcel Energy Center			The Mars Volta
November 11, 2006	Hollywood	United States	The Roxy			
European leg II
November 20, 2006	London	England	Abbey Road Studios			
November 21, 2006	London	England	BBC Studios			
November 22, 2006	London	England	Roundhouse			
November 24, 2006	Hamburg	Germany	Colorline Arena			
November 26, 2006	Frankfurt	Germany	Festhalle			Mike Watt + The Missingmen
November 27, 2006	Stuttgart	Germany	Schleyer-Halle			
November 29, 2006	Milan	Italy	Filaforum			Mike Watt + The Missingmen
November 30, 2006	Milan	Italy	Filaforum			Mike Watt + The Missingmen
December 3, 2006	Zürich	Switzerland	Hallenstadion			Mike Watt + The Missingmen
December 4, 2006	Zürich	Switzerland	Hallenstadion			Mike Watt + The Missingmen
December 6, 2006	Vienna	Austria	Stadthalle			Mike Watt + The Missingmen
December 7, 2006	Vienna	Austria	Stadthalle			Mike Watt + The Missingmen
December 9, 2006	Copenhagen	Denmark	Copenhagen Forum			Mike Watt + The Missingmen
December 11, 2006	Stockholm	Sweden	Stockholm Globe Arena			Mike Watt + The Missingmen
December 12, 2006	Stockholm	Sweden	Stockholm Globe Arena			Mike Watt + The Missingmen
North American leg II
January 13, 2007	Dallas	United States	American Airlines Center			Gnarls Barkley
January 15, 2007	St. Louis	United States	Scottrade Center			Gnarls Barkley
January 17, 2007	Nashville	United States	Gaylord Entertainment Center			Gnarls Barkley
January 20, 2007	Cincinnati	United States	U.S. Bank Arena			Gnarls Barkley
January 22, 2007	Raleigh	United States	RBC Center			Gnarls Barkley
January 23, 2007	Charlotte	United States	Charlotte Bobcats Arena			Gnarls Barkley
January 25, 2007	Washington, D.C.	United States	Verizon Center			Gnarls Barkley
January 26, 2007	Charlottesville	United States	John Paul Jones Arena			Gnarls Barkley
January 28, 2007	Tampa	United States	St. Pete Times Forum			Gnarls Barkley
January 30, 2007	Orlando	United States	Amway Arena			
January 31, 2007	Sunrise	United States	BankAtlantic Center			Gnarls Barkley
February 27, 2007	Rosemont	United States	Allstate Arena			Gnarls Barkley
February 28, 2007	Milwaukee	United States	Bradley Center			Gnarls Barkley
March 2, 2007	Des Moines	United States	Wells Fargo Arena			Gnarls Barkley
March 3, 2007	Champaign	United States	Assembly Hall			Gnarls Barkley
March 6, 2007	San Antonio	United States	AT&T Center			Gnarls Barkley
March 7, 2007	Houston	United States	Toyota Center			Gnarls Barkley
March 10, 2007	Mexico City	Mexico	Foro Sol			Modest Mouse; Porter
March 12, 2007	Oklahoma City	United States	Cox Convention Center			Mickey Avalon
Australian & New Zealand leg
April 7, 2007	Adelaide	Australia	Adelaide Entertainment Center			
April 8, 2007	Melbourne	Australia	Sidney Myer Music Bowl	38,057 / 39,513	$2,799,880	
April 10, 2007	Melbourne	Australia	Sidney Myer Music Bowl	38,057 / 39,513	$2,799,880	Har Mar Superstar
April 11, 2007	Melbourne	Australia	Sidney Myer Music Bowl	38,057 / 39,513	$2,799,880	
April 13, 2007	Brisbane	Australia	Brisbane Entertainment Centre			
April 14, 2007	Brisbane	Australia	Brisbane Entertainment Centre			Har Mar Superstar
April 16, 2007	Sydney	Australia	Acer Arena	45,329 / 45,329	$3,898,344	Har Mar Superstar
April 17, 2007	Sydney	Australia	Acer Arena	45,329 / 45,329	$3,898,344	Har Mar Superstar
April 19, 2007	Sydney	Australia	Acer Arena	45,329 / 45,329	$3,898,344	
April 21, 2007	Auckland	New Zealand	Vector Arena			Har Mar Superstar
April 22, 2007	Auckland	New Zealand	Vector Arena			
North America
April 28, 2007	Indio	United States	Coachella Valley Music and Arts Festival			
Japanese leg II
June 5, 2007	Tokyo	Japan	Tokyo Dome			
June 6, 2007	Tokyo	Japan	Tokyo Dome			
June 8, 2007	Osaka	Japan	Osaka Dome			
European leg III
June 22, 2007	Bilbao	Spain	Bilbao Live Festival			
June 24, 2007	Nijmegen	Netherlands	Goffertpark	60,468 / 60,468	$3,713,521	Dirty Pretty Things; Mickey Avalon
June 26, 2007	Inđija	Serbia	Green Fest	101,352 / 105,563		Edo Maajka; Kiril; Ritam Nereda; Kasabian|
June 28, 2007	Udine	Italy	Stadio Friuli			
June 29, 2007	Munich	Germany	Olympiastadion			
July 1, 2007	Hamburg	Germany	HSH Nordbank Arena			
July 3, 2007	Chorzów	Poland	Slaski Stadium			Jet; Mickey Avalon
July 4, 2007	Dresden	Germany	Festwiese Ostragehege			My Chemical Romance
July 6, 2007	Paris	France	Parc des Princes			Jet; Dirty Pretty Things
July 7, 2007	London	England	Wembley Stadium (Live Earth)			
July 7, 2007	Roskilde	Denmark	Roskilde Festival			
August 23, 2007	Glasgow	Scotland	Hampden Park	38,519 / 40,000	$3,095,980	
August 25, 2007	Reading	England	Reading Festival			
August 26, 2007	Leeds	England	Leeds Festival			

- Reschedules on March 19(Osaka), 22 and 23(Tokyo) because of Anthony Kiedis' pneumonia.

=== North American leg I ===
The first North American leg grossed 25.6 million dollars in ticket sales.

== Boxscore ==
Venue	City	Tickets Sold/ Tickets Available	Gross
Acer Arena	Sydney, Australia	45,329/45,329	4,017,983
Brisbane Entertainment Centre	Brisbane, Australia	20,994/21,352	1,958,334
Foro Sol	Mexico City, Mexico	33,406/46,530	1,438,419
AT&T Center	San Antonio, Texas	14,885/14,885	827,747
Bradley Center	Milwaukee, Wisconsin	10,822/14,000	612,172
Allstate Arena	Rosemont, Illinois	NA	968,836
BankAtlantic Center	Sunrise, Florida	14,327/14,327	796,950
RBC Center	Raleigh, North Carolina	14,041/14,166	777,739
Verizon Center	Washington, D.C.	15,000/15,000	975,000
Charlotte Bobcats Arena	Charlotte, North Carolina	11,892/12,040	626,529
St. Pete Times Forum	Tampa, Florida	13,950/13,950	728,548
U.S. Bank Arena	Cincinnati	12,188/12,188	668,665
The Forum	Inglewood, California	NA	1,759,497
Air Canada Centre	Toronto, Ontario	NA	1,708,072
Wachovia Center	Philadelphia, Pennsylvania	NA	1,882,614
Xcel Energy Center	St. Paul, Minnesota	NA	884,549
Oakland Arena	Oakland, California	NA	1,359,971
TD Garden	Boston, Massachusetts	NA	1,746,492
Continental Airlines Arena	East Rutherford, New Jersey	NA	2,111,333
Schottenstein Center	Columbus, Ohio	11,948/11,948	611,260
Gwinnett	Atlanta	10,472/10,472	560,353
Palace of Auburn Hills	Auburn Hills	15,492/15,492	792,526
Van Andel Arena	Grand Rapids	11,477/11,477	567,592
Quicken Loans Arena	Cleveland	NA	583,535

== Opening acts ==
- The Mars Volta
- Gnarls Barkley
- Dizzee Rascal
- Ben Harper and the Innocent Criminals
- Dinosaur Jr.
- Jet
- My Chemical Romance
- Kasabian
- The Missingmen
- Mickey Avalon
- !!!
- Dirty Pretty Things
- Har Mar Superstar
- Chuck Dukowski Sextet
- Soweto Gospel Choir
- Biffy Clyro
- Reverend and the Makers
- Patti Smith and The Meters also joined the band onstage to cover their own songs.

== Personnel ==
- Anthony Kiedis – lead vocals, drums (intro to Californication in the 2006 concerts)
- Flea – bass, backing vocals, lead vocals (solo section), trumpet, keyboards
- John Frusciante – guitar, backing vocals, lead vocals (solo section)
- Chad Smith – drums

=== Additional musicians ===
- Josh Klinghoffer – guitar, backing vocals, keyboard, percussion (2007)
- Marcel Rodriguez-Lopez – keyboards, clavinet, percussion (2006–January 2007)
- Chris Warren – keyboards, backing vocals (You're Gonna Get Yours (2006), Catholic School Girls Rule (2007))

== Gallery ==
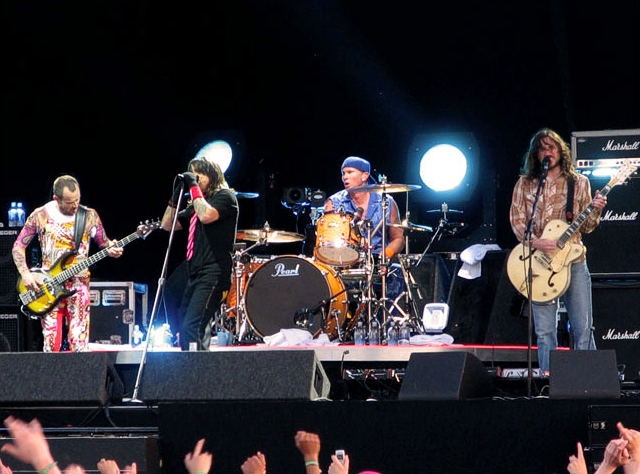
Red Hot Chili Peppers performing at the Pinkpop Festival on June 5, 2006, Netherlands

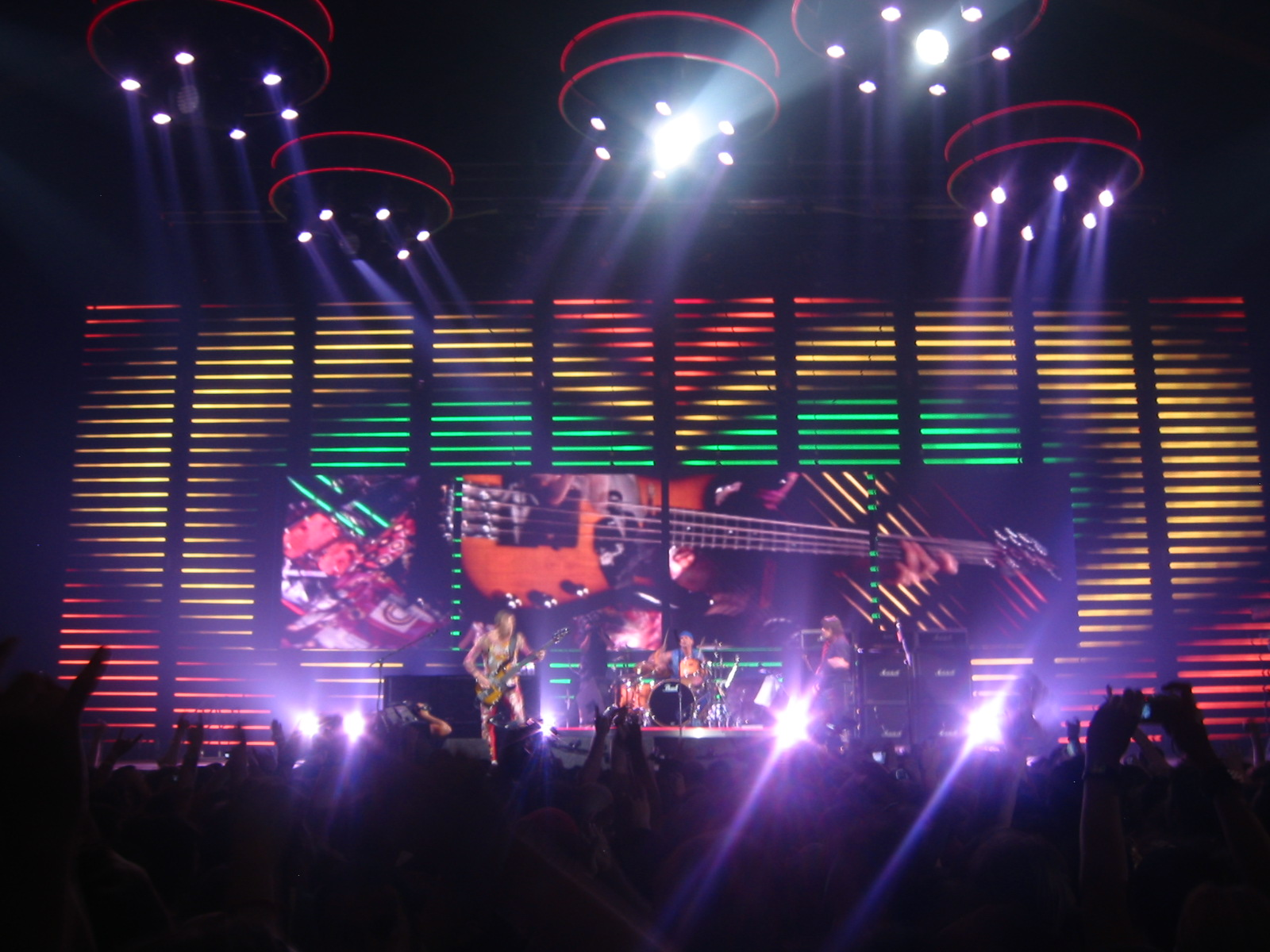
The concert at the Halle Tony Garnier in Lyon, June 6, 2006

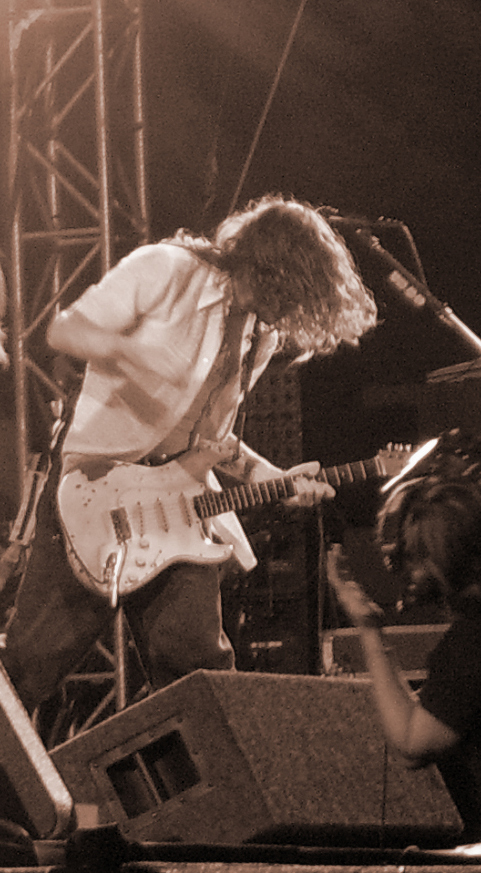
John Frusciante at the July 3, 2006 concert at the Madejski Stadium, Reading

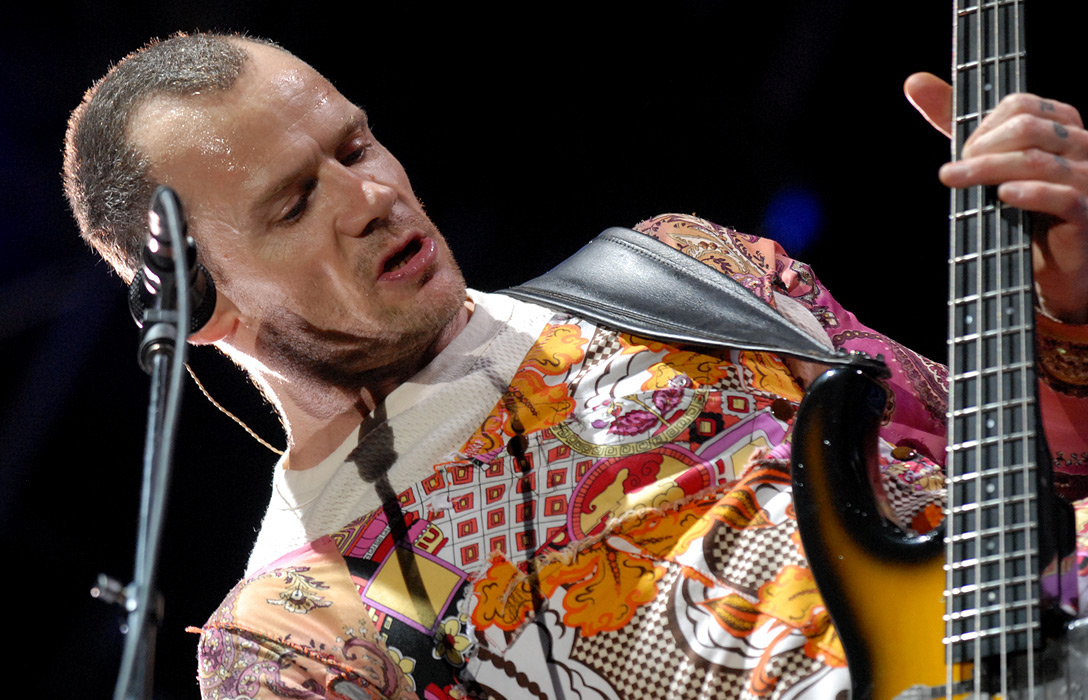
Flea at the Oxegen Festival on July 9, 2006, Ireland

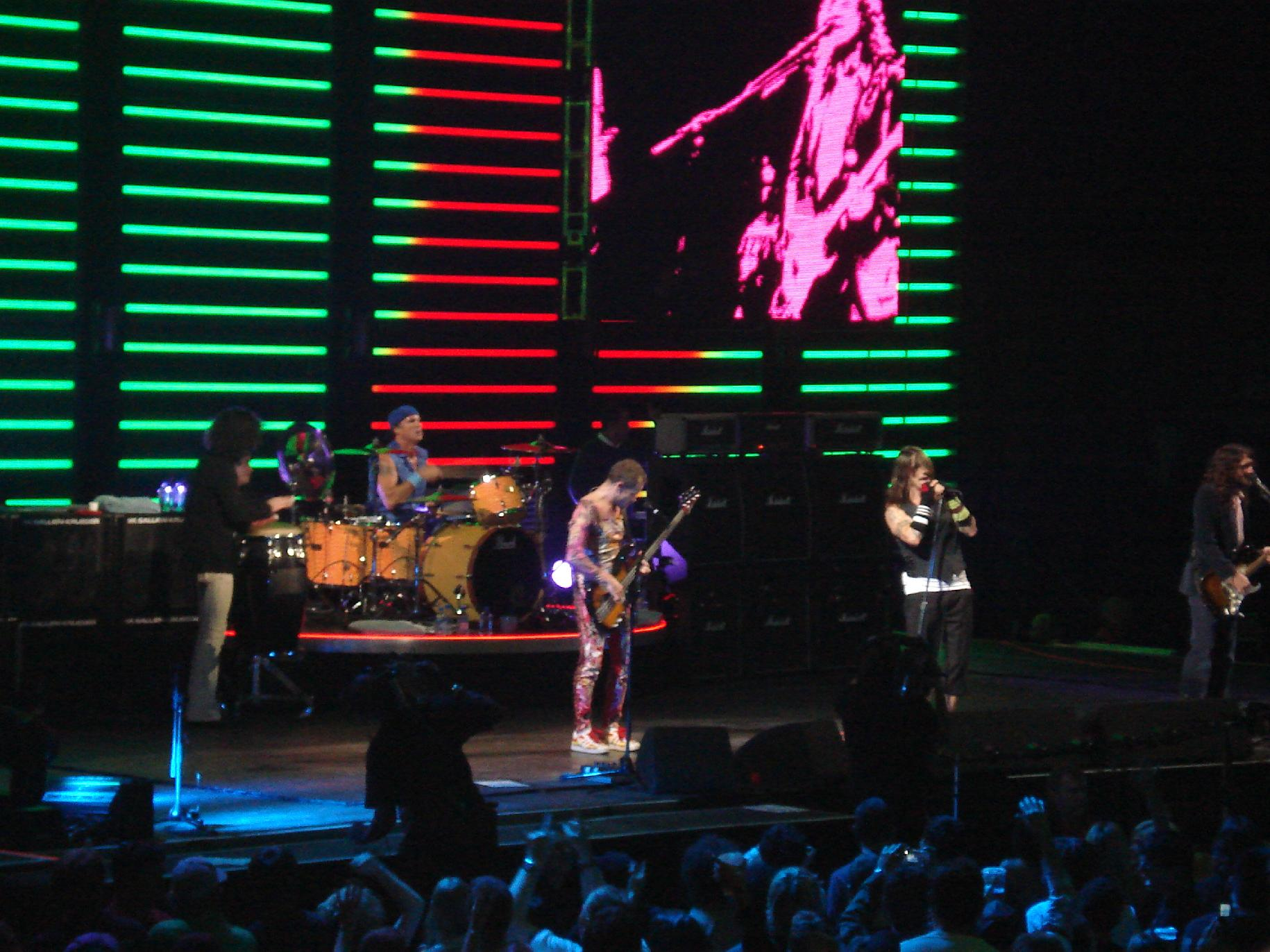
The concert at the Air Canada Centre in Toronto, September 25, 2006 (the musician on the far left is Marcel Rodríguez-López on the bongos)
