= Snow (Hey Oh) =

2006 single by Red Hot Chili Peppers

Single by Red Hot Chili Peppers

from the album Stadium Arcadium
- B-side: "Funny Face"; "I'll Be Your Domino"
- Released: November 20, 2006
- Recorded: 2005
- Studio: The Mansion, Los Angeles
- Genre: Stadium rock
- Length: 5:35 (album version); 4:00 (radio edit)
- Label: Warner Bros.
- Songwriters: Flea, Frusciante, Kiedis, Smith
- Producer: Rick Rubin

Red Hot Chili Peppers singles chronology
"Tell Me Baby" (2006)	"Snow (Hey Oh)" (2006)	"Desecration Smile" (2007)

Music video
- "Snow (Hey Oh)" on YouTube

"Snow (Hey Oh)" (occasionally stylized as "Snow ((Hey Oh))") is a song by American band Red Hot Chili Peppers from their 2006 double album, Stadium Arcadium. The song was released as the follow-up single to "Tell Me Baby" in 2006, and became the band's third straight number one hit on the Billboard Modern Rock chart, a spot it held for five straight weeks. The single was their 11th to top that chart, setting a record they still hold, extended in 2016 to 13 number ones.

Vocalist Anthony Kiedis states that the track is "about surviving, starting fresh. I've made a mess of everything, but I have a blank slate—a canvas of snow—and I get to start over."

== Composition ==
"Snow (Hey Oh)" is a characteristically soft, melodic song, much like those from the band's prior album By the Way. The song is driven by a rapid guitar riff by John Frusciante, and makes use of double stops on the bass by Flea. The flute harmonies are played on Frusciante's Mellotron Mk VI. The song is written in the key of G♯ minor and is at a moderate tempo of 105 BPM.

== Reception ==
Frusciante.net revealed that this was going to be the third of seven songs released as a single from Stadium Arcadium. Before even being released as a single, it climbed to #53 in the UK iTunes top 100 on May 13. Like its predecessor "Tell Me Baby", it peaked at #16 in the UK Singles Chart. On January 17, 2007, "Snow (Hey Oh)" became the band's record-breaking 11th number-one Modern Rock single in the United States and is the third consecutive chart-topping Modern Rock single from Stadium Arcadium. In Germany, it was the band's most successful song, reaching #5, making it the band's only Top-10-song there.

== Music video ==
In an interview, Tony Kaye, who also directed the video for "Dani California", told MTV he would be directing the video for the song. However, his footage wasn't used. Instead, Warner commissioned director Nick Wickham to shoot a new video showing the band at the October 17 and 18, 2006 shows at the Continental Airlines Arena in East Rutherford, New Jersey, along with black and white film of fans at the parking lot and lines at the live show.

== Live performances ==
"Snow (Hey Oh)" has been the second most performed song from Stadium Arcadium and has been performed over 250 times since 2006. On June 28, 2012, at the band's concert at Goffertpark in Nijmegen, Netherlands during the I'm with You Tour, the band performed the song for the first time since the end of the Stadium Arcadium Tour nearly five years earlier. As of 2023, the song is still featured regularly in the band's setlists.

== Appearances and samples ==
In 2008 "Snow (Hey Oh)" was used as one of the official themes of WWE WrestleMania XXIV. It was also used in Scrubs in the two-part episode "My Finale" and during the end credits in Death Note: The Last Name. The song can be heard in a flashback scene in the Cold Case episode "Sabotage". It was in a scene from Brothers and Sisters season 1 episode 23. The song was sampled in the 2024 track "Thick of It" by British rapper and internet personality KSI.

== Track listings and formats ==
CD single

1. "Snow (Hey Oh)" – 5:34
2. "Permutation" (Live) – 3:43

Maxi single 9362 42983-2

1. "Snow (Hey Oh)" – 5:34
2. "Funny Face" – 4:46
3. "I'll Be Your Domino" – 3:54

International CD single/7" picture disc 5439 15624-2

1. "Snow (Hey Oh)" – 5:34
2. "Funny Face" – 4:46

iTunes version single

1. "Snow (Hey Oh)" – 5:34
2. "Funny Face" – 4:46
3. "I'll Be Your Domino" – 3:54
4. "Permutation" (Live) – 3:43

== Personnel ==
Credits adapted from AllMusic.

Red Hot Chili Peppers

- Anthony Kiedis – lead vocals
- John Frusciante – guitars, backing vocals, mellotron
- Flea – bass guitar
- Chad Smith - drums, percussion

Additional musicians

- Greg Kurstin - Organ on "Funny Face"

Recording personnel

- Rick Rubin – production
- Andrew Scheps – mixing and engineering
- Ryan Hewitt – mixing and engineering
- Dana Nielsen – engineering
- Kevin Gray and Steve Hoffman – mastering (vinyl)
- Vlado Meller – mastering (CD)
- Matt Taylor – design and art direction

== Charts ==
=== Weekly charts ===
2006–2007 weekly chart performance for "Snow (Hey Oh)"
Chart (2006–2007)	Peak position
Australia (ARIA)	35
Austria (Ö3 Austria Top 40)	5
Belgium (Ultratop 50 Flanders)	9
Belgium (Ultratop 50 Wallonia)	39
Canada Hot 100 (Billboard)	35
Canada Rock (Billboard)	1
Czech Republic Airplay (ČNS IFPI)	3
Europe (Eurochart Hot 100)	18
Germany (GfK)	5
Hungary (Rádiós Top 40)	1
Ireland (IRMA)	13
Italy (FIMI)	24
Netherlands (Dutch Top 40)	5
Netherlands (Single Top 100)	5
New Zealand (Recorded Music NZ)	10
Poland Airplay (ZPAV)	6
Romania (Romanian Top 100)	68
Slovakia Airplay (ČNS IFPI)	5
Sweden (Sverigetopplistan)	19
Switzerland (Schweizer Hitparade)	9
UK Singles (Official Charts)	16
US Billboard Hot 100	22
US Adult Pop Airplay (Billboard)	21
US Alternative Airplay (Billboard)	1
US Mainstream Rock (Billboard)	3
Venezuela Pop Rock (Record Report)	4

2025 weekly chart performance for "Snow (Hey Oh)"
Chart (2025)	Peak position
Russia Streaming (TopHit)	99

=== Year-end charts ===
2007 year-end chart performance for "Snow (Hey Oh)"
Chart (2007)	Position
Austria (Ö3 Austria Top 40)	38
Belgium (Ultratop 50 Flanders)	53
Canada Rock (Radio & Records)	19
Europe (Eurochart Hot 100)	63
Germany (Official German Charts)	42
Hungary (Rádiós Top 40)	3
Netherlands (Dutch Top 40)	36
Netherlands (Single Top 100)	27
Switzerland (Schweizer Hitparade)	30
US Billboard Hot 100	91
US Alternative Songs (Billboard)	10
US Mainstream Rock Songs (Billboard)	23

2008 year-end chart performance for "Snow (Hey Oh)"
Chart (2008)	Position
Hungary (Rádiós Top 40)	38

== Certifications and sales ==
Certifications and sales for "Snow (Hey Oh)"
Region	Certification	Certified units/sales
Denmark (IFPI Danmark)	Platinum	90,000^{‡}
Germany (BVMI)	Gold	150,000^{^}
Italy (FIMI) (since 2009)	2× Platinum	200,000^{‡}
Italy	—	20,000
Japan (RIAJ) Full-length ringtone	Gold	100,000^{*}
New Zealand (RMNZ)	6× Platinum	180,000^{‡}
United Kingdom (BPI)	2× Platinum	1,200,000^{‡}
Spain (Promusicae)	Platinum	60,000^{‡}
United States (RIAA)	4× Platinum	4,000,000^{‡}
^{*} Sales figures based on certification alone.^{^} Shipments figures based on certification alone.^{‡} Sales+streaming figures based on certification alone.
