= Hump de Bump =

2007 single by Red Hot Chili Peppers

Single by Red Hot Chili Peppers

from the album Stadium Arcadium
- B-side: "Joe"; "Save This Lady"
- Released: April 7, 2007
- Recorded: 2005
- Studio: The Mansion, Los Angeles, California
- Genre: Funk rock
- Length: 3:33
- Label: Warner Bros.
- Songwriters: Flea, Frusciante, Kiedis, Smith
- Producer: Rick Rubin

Red Hot Chili Peppers singles chronology
"Desecration Smile" (2007)	"Hump de Bump" (2007)	"The Adventures of Rain Dance Maggie" (2011)

Music video
- "Hump de Bump" on YouTube

"Hump de Bump" is a song by the Red Hot Chili Peppers from their 2006 double album, Stadium Arcadium. The song is the fifth and final single released from Stadium Arcadium and the last single the band would release with John Frusciante until "Black Summer" in 2022, as he had quit the band in 2009 before returning in 2019. Originally expected to be the fourth single for the US, Canada and Australia, ("Desecration Smile" was the fourth single released internationally) the Red Hot Chili Peppers decided to make the single and video a worldwide release thanks to the positive feedback on the video, which was directed by comedian and good friend Chris Rock. The single was released in the US on April 7, 2007 while it was released May 10, 2007 in the rest of the world.

== Style ==
Despite the change in musical style of the rest of the album, its sound is similar to that of the band's earlier music. The track was originally titled "Ghost Dance 2000" in reference to the song "American Ghost Dance" from the album Freaky Styley, as the two songs sound similar, particularly the intro sections. The title was changed to "Hump de Bump" near the end of recording.

Originally a jam, Kiedis recorded it on his phone to save it for a later recording. Flea plays trumpet on this track, quoting Dizzy Gillespie's "Salt Peanuts" near the end of the track. There is also a large "tribal" instrumental bridge on this track, similar to that on "Breaking the Girl", a song from Blood Sugar Sex Magik. During live shows in 2006, Marcel Rodriguez-Lopez would come on stage and play bongos during this section. The song may also pay tribute to either the Marvin Gaye song, "Can I Get a Witness", the Soul Brothers Six song, "Some Kind of Wonderful", the Grand Funk Railroad song, "Some Kind of Wonderful", or the Commodores song, "(Can I) Get A Witness?", because of the line "Can I get my co-defendant?"

== Music video ==
The video was shot in mid-November 2006, and was directed by Chris Rock. The video takes place at a city block party on the set of Everybody Hates Chris with Chris Rock as himself, being kept out of his own block party by a security guard (Craig Robinson), while the band is playing the song at the party. Rock agreed to direct the video only if "they were the only white people in it."

The video leaked to the internet on March 9, and it officially first premiered in Australia on March 13, on Channel Seven's Sunrise program and in America/Canada on March 14 on Total Request Live.

== Live performances ==
"Hump de Bump" was performed 32 times on the band's 2006-2007 Stadium Arcadium World Tour. On March 16, 2018, the song was played for the first time in almost 11 years (and first time with guitarist Josh Klinghoffer) at Lollapolooza Argentina. It was last performed in March 2019.

== Formats and track listings ==
CD single 1

1. "Hump de Bump" – 3:33
2. "Joe" – 3:54
3. "Save This Lady" – 4:17

CD single 2

1. "Hump de Bump" – 3:33
2. "An Opening" (Live)

UK single

1. "Hump de Bump" – 3:33
2. "An Opening" (Live)
3. "Blood Sugar Sex Magik" (Live)

International maxi CD

1. "Hump de Bump" – 3:33
2. "An Opening" (Live)
3. "Blood Sugar Sex Magik" (Live)

International 7" picture disc

1. "Hump de Bump" – 3:33
2. "An Opening" (Live)

== Personnel ==
Red Hot Chili Peppers

- Anthony Kiedis - vocals
- John Frusciante - guitar
- Flea - bass, trumpet
- Chad Smith - drums

== Charts ==
Weekly chart performance for "Hump de Bump"
Chart (2007)	Peak position
Australia (ARIA)	17
Canada Hot 100 (Billboard)	63
Canada Rock (Billboard)	5
Czech Republic Airplay (ČNS IFPI)	83
Germany (GfK)	83
Netherlands (Dutch Top 40)	43
Slovakia Airplay (ČNS IFPI)	24
UK Singles (Official Charts)	41
US Billboard Hot Modern Rock Tracks	8
US Billboard Mainstream Rock	27
