= Desecration Smile =

Single by Red Hot Chili Peppers

from the album Stadium Arcadium
- B-side: "Joe"; "Save This Lady"
- Released: February 12, 2007
- Recorded: 2005
- Studio: The Mansion, Los Angeles, California
- Genre: Alternative rock, folk rock, psychedelic rock
- Length: 5:02 (album version); 4:15 (edit)
- Label: Warner Bros.
- Songwriters: Flea, Frusciante, Kiedis, Smith
- Producer: Rick Rubin

Red Hot Chili Peppers singles chronology
"Snow (Hey Oh)" (2006)	"Desecration Smile" (2007)	"Hump de Bump" (2007)

Music video
- "Desecration Smile" on YouTube

"Desecration Smile" is a song from the Red Hot Chili Peppers and was on their 2006 double album, Stadium Arcadium. The song was the fourth single released from the album.

The song was first heard by fans when it was played at the Bridge School Benefit in 2004. However, the structure and chorus of the song are different from the version released on Stadium Arcadium.

The single contained the album outtakes, "Joe" (which was a tribute to Joe Strummer) and "Save This Lady". Both songs were also on the single for "Hump de Bump".

The cover artwork is from Stefanie Schneider.

== Composition ==
Desecration Smile is in the key of E major in the intro, E minor in the verses and D major in the refrain. It has a moderate tempo of 92 BPM.

== Formats and track listings ==
CD single 1 5439 19997-9

1. "Desecration Smile"
2. "Joe" (previously unreleased) – 3:54

CD single 2 9362 49991-9

1. "Desecration Smile"
2. "Funky Monks" (live) – 6:29
3. "Save This Lady" (previously unreleased) – 4:17

Promo Single PR016186

1. "Desecration Smile" (album version)
2. "Desecration Smile" (radio edit)

7" picture disc 5439 19997-6

1. "Desecration Smile"
2. "Funky Monks" (live) – 6:29

== Personnel ==
- Anthony Kiedis - lead vocals
- John Frusciante - acoustic and electric guitars, backing vocals, piano
- Flea - bass guitar
- Chad Smith - drums, percussion
- Emily Kokal - chorus vocals

== Music video ==
The music video was shot and released in February 2007 and directed by "Under the Bridge" director Gus Van Sant. It was shot entirely in one take with one camera and featured the band huddled together singing all the way through. There is also an alternate version of the band singing and playing their instruments by the ocean cut together with parts of the official video. Although the first one is considered the official, it was the alternative version that was published on the official Warner Bros. YouTube account.

== Live performances ==
"Desecration Smile" has been performed just 14 times with its first performance coming in 2004, two years before the release of the Stadium Arcadium album. The song has not been performed since 2007.

== Charts ==
=== Weekly charts ===
Chart (2007)	Peak position
Belgium (Ultratip Bubbling Under Flanders)	13
Germany (GfK)	67
Netherlands (Dutch Top 40)	13
Netherlands (Single Top 100)	24
New Zealand (Recorded Music NZ)	33
Slovakia Airplay (ČNS IFPI)	26
UK Singles (OCC)	27

=== Year-end charts ===
Chart (2007)	Position
Netherlands (Dutch Top 40)	95
