= Tell Me Baby =

2006 single by Red Hot Chili Peppers

Single by Red Hot Chili Peppers

from the album Stadium Arcadium
- B-side: "A Certain Someone"; "Mercy Mercy"
- Released: July 17, 2006
- Recorded: March–December 2005
- Studio: The Mansion (Los Angeles, California)
- Genre: Funk rock; alternative rock; stadium rock
- Length: 4:07
- Label: Warner Bros.
- Songwriters: Flea; John Frusciante; Anthony Kiedis; Chad Smith
- Producer: Rick Rubin

Red Hot Chili Peppers singles chronology
"Dani California" (2006)	"Tell Me Baby" (2006)	"Snow (Hey Oh)" (2006)

Music video
- "Tell Me Baby" on YouTube

"Tell Me Baby" is a song by the American rock band Red Hot Chili Peppers, featured on the album Stadium Arcadium. The song was released as the follow-up to the single "Dani California" on July 17, 2006. Its lyrics are about the people who moved to Los Angeles to obtain fame and fortune; John Frusciante, the band's guitarist, dominates the song, while there is also rapping by the singer Anthony Kiedis. The music video, directed by Jonathan Dayton and Valerie Faris, features interviewees who came to California to achieve fame or love to play music; they are later surprised with the appearance of Red Hot Chili Peppers members in the room. The song received positive reception from critics, topping the Billboard charts for Alternative Airplay for four weeks.

== Background and composition ==
Red Hot Chili Peppers is an American rock band. After releasing By the Way (2002), the band embarked on a two-year tour for the album, the By the Way Tour. In September 2004, the band started working on Stadium Arcadium, a 28-song double album, which they recorded at The Mansion in Los Angeles, California. It was produced by Rick Rubin, with whom they had worked previously. The album was recorded between March 16 and December 2005. In March 2006, the band unveiled the tracks of Stadium Arcadium, including "Tell Me Baby". The album was ultimately released on May 9, 2006.

"Tell Me Baby" has been described as a funk rock, alternative rock, and stadium rock song. The lyrics are about the dreams of pilgrims in Los Angeles who want to obtain fame and fortune. It starts with a slow electric guitar accompanied by high-pitched piano notes, before switching to a groovy style. The song is bass-heavy, featuring Flea's slap bass playing and "a catchy pop chorus". John Frusciante, however, dominates the entire song. The song also features Anthony Kiedis rapping.

The music video for "Tell Me Baby" was directed by Jonathan Dayton and Valerie Faris, a directing duo that has worked on many Chili Peppers videos. Flea said, "It's the best [video] we ever did." For the video, Dayton and Faris interviewed and auditioned people who originally came to California to achieve some sort of fame and people who play music just for the sake of playing music. During the callback for the auditioned people, their second audition was filmed and the members of the Chili Peppers surprisingly entered the room during auditions to join in playing along.

== Release and live performances ==
In June 2006, the release date of "Tell Me Baby" was announced. "Tell Me Baby" was ultimately released on July 17, 2006, published by Warner Bros. Music. It preceded the single "Dani California" and was succeeded by "Snow (Hey Oh)". "Tell Me Baby" was performed several times since its release, including in July and September 2006, during a 2022 tour in Seville, Spain, Denver, Colorado, and Santa Clara, California, and during a 2023 tour in London.

== Reception and legacy ==
Nick Mitchell at The Skinny gave the song three out of five stars, stating that the song is "neither complex nor memorable", but that listeners would enjoy the upbeat sound. A Billboard magazine reviewer commended the song, praising Frusciante's guitar. While saying that it lacks the "rock power" of "Dani California", they said the melody and energy are closer to the band's core. BBC News described "Tell Me Baby" and "Dani California" as mixing "funk with acoustic janglings", as well as choruses. A Ultimate Guitar reviewer described the song as "very upbeat", while Brian Hiatt of Rolling Stone saw the song as "supercatchy".

"Tell Me Baby" topped the Billboard charts for Alternative Airplay for four weeks. ABC News listed "Tell Me Baby" as one of the most annoying songs of 2006. In 2011, Jacob Adams of PopMatters ranked the song among the best Red Hot Chili Peppers songs of all time, placing it on the 13th spot.

== Personnel ==
Credits are adapted from Tidal.

- Anthony Kiedis – lead vocals, writer
- John Frusciante – guitar, writer
- Flea – bass, writer
- Chad Smith – drums, writer
- Lenny Castro – percussion
- Paulinho da Costa – percussion
- Rick Rubin – producer
- Vlado Meller – mastering engineer
- Ryan Hewitt – mixing engineer, recording engineer
- Sara Killion – assistant mixing engineer
- Mark Linett – recording engineer
- Andrew Scheps – recording engineer

== Formats and track listings ==
CD (version 1)

1. "Tell Me Baby" – 4:07
2. "A Certain Someone" – 2:25

CD (version 2)

1. "Tell Me Baby" – 4:07
2. "Mercy Mercy" – 4:01
3. "Lyon 6.6.06" (Live) – 3:53

7" Picture Disc

1. "Tell Me Baby" – 4:08
2. "Mercy Mercy" – 4:00

== Charts ==
=== Weekly charts ===
Weekly chart performance for "Tell Me Baby"
Chart (2006)	Peak position
Australia (ARIA)	20
Austria (Ö3 Austria Top 40)	39
Belgium (Ultratop 50 Flanders)	44
Belgium (Ultratip Bubbling Under Wallonia)	10
Canada Rock (Billboard)	1
Croatia (HRT)	1
Czech Republic Airplay (ČNS IFPI)	7
Denmark (Tracklisten)	13
Germany (GfK)	37
Hungary (Editors' Choice Top 40)	33
Ireland (IRMA)	12
Italy (FIMI)	87
Netherlands (Dutch Top 40)	18
Netherlands (Single Top 100)	27
New Zealand (Recorded Music NZ)	16
Norway (VG-lista)	20
Poland Airplay (OLiS)	5
Scottish Singles Sales (Official Charts)	10
Slovakia Airplay (ČNS IFPI)	17
Sweden (Sverigetopplistan)	57
Switzerland (Schweizer Hitparade)	43
UK Singles (Official Charts)	16
UK Rock & Metal (Official Charts)	1
US Billboard Hot 100	50
US Adult Alternative Airplay (Billboard)	27
US Adult Pop Airplay (Billboard)	22
US Alternative Airplay (Billboard)	1
US Mainstream Rock Airplay (Billboard)	8
Venezuela Pop Rock (Record Report)	1

=== Year-end charts ===
Year-end chart performance for "Tell Me Baby"
Chart (2006)	Position
Brazil (Crowley)	96
Canada Rock (Radio & Records)	17
Netherlands (Dutch Top 40)	93
UK Singles (OCC)	177
US Alternative Songs (Billboard)	15

== Certifications ==
Certifications for "Tell Me Baby"
Region	Certification	Certified units/sales
United Kingdom (BPI)	Silver	200,000^{‡}
^{‡} Sales+streaming figures based on certification alone.

== Release history ==
Release dates and formats for "Tell Me Baby"
Region	Date	Format	Label(s)	Ref.
United States	October 10, 2006	Mainstream airplay	Warner Bros.	

== Sources ==
- Hausen, David (2006a). Red Hot Chili Peppers - Making of Tell Me Baby 1. Red Hot Chili Peppers (video). California, United States – via YouTube.
- Hausen, David (2006b). Red Hot Chili Peppers - Making of Tell Me Baby 2. Red Hot Chili Peppers (video). California, United States – via YouTube.
