= Stadium Arcadium =

Studio album by Red Hot Chili Peppers
- Released: May 5, 2006
- Recorded: 2004–2005
- Studios: The Mansion, Los Angeles; Sound City, Van Nuys, California
- Genres: Funk rock; alternative rock
- Length: 122:19
- Label: Warner Bros.
- Producer: Rick Rubin

Red Hot Chili Peppers chronology
| Live in Hyde Park (2004) | Stadium Arcadium (2006) | I'm with You (2011) |

Singles from Stadium Arcadium
- 1. "Dani California" Released: April 3, 2006; 2. "Tell Me Baby" Released: July 18, 2006; 3. "Snow (Hey Oh)" Released: November 20, 2006; 4. "Desecration Smile" Released: February 12, 2007; 5. "Hump de Bump" Released: April 7, 2007

Stadium Arcadium is the ninth studio album by American rock band Red Hot Chili Peppers. It is a double album, first released in Germany on May 5, 2006, and released on May 9, 2006 in the United States on Warner Bros. Records. It produced five singles: "Dani California", "Tell Me Baby," "Snow (Hey Oh)", "Desecration Smile" and "Hump de Bump," along with the band's first fan-made music video, for the song "Charlie". In the United States, Stadium Arcadium became the band's first number-one album. Stadium Arcadium was originally scheduled to be a trilogy of albums each released six months apart, but was eventually condensed into a double album.

The album was praised for integrating musical styles from several aspects of the band's career. The album gained the band seven Grammy Award nominations in 2007 including an award for Best Rock Album and one for Best Boxed or Special Limited Edition Package. Winning four out of seven Grammy Awards, it was the most nominations that the band had garnered in their (at the time) 23-year career. Rolling Stone has included the album on its list of Best Albums of the 2000s. Kiedis attributed the album's success to less abrasive dynamics within the band, saying that the band's "chemistry, when it comes to writing, is better than ever. There was always a struggle to dominate lyrically. But we are now confident enough in who we are, so everybody feels more comfortable contributing more and more valuable, quality stuff."

After the culmination of the Stadium Arcadium tour, guitarist John Frusciante left the band in July 2009. It was his last album with the band until the release of Unlimited Love in 2022, more than a decade later.

== Background ==
After the release of the band's previous album, By the Way, the Red Hot Chili Peppers embarked on the By the Way Tour, from July 2002 to a mid-June 2004 date at London's Hyde Park. The band later appeared at the 2004 Democratic National Convention and at Rock am Ring to tie up their tour in support of By the Way. The band then settled down to begin recording its with producer Rick Rubin, with whom the band had recorded its previous four albums.

The formation and recording of Stadium Arcadium took place at the Mansion where the Peppers had recorded their 1991 breakthrough Blood Sugar Sex Magik. Given the house's reputation for being "haunted," guitarist John Frusciante recalled that he felt "there were beings of higher intelligence controlling what I was doing, and I didn’t know how to talk about it or explain it...it was very clear to me that the music was coming from somewhere other than me." However, Kiedis noted that during the recording process of the album "everybody was in a good mood. There was very little tension, very little anxiety, very little weirdness going on and every day we showed up to this funky room in the Valley, and everyone felt more comfortable than ever bringing in their ideas." The band originally wanted to create an "old-fashioned Meet the Beatles-like record", and to keep the number of songs down to about 12, to make "a small, digestible piece of art." They ended up writing 28 new songs, with Rubin producing all tracks.

== Music ==
Described as a funk rock and alternative rock album, Stadium Arcadium combines many aspects of musical style from throughout the band's career, with many fans and critics welcoming the return of the band's signature funk sound and the use of power chords after their significant absence from By the Way. John Frusciante said in 2006, "I didn't want to necessarily have songs that were just heavy metal songs the whole way through, but I wanted to have a certain amount of songs that had choruses that were just heavy metal riffs."

It was also noted that Frusciante's playing style had changed from his signature 'less is more' style, inspired by punk and new-wave guitarists, to a more flashy approach, not seen extensively in his playing since Mother's Milk, his first album with the band; drawing influence from guitarists such as Eddie Van Halen, Tony Iommi (of Black Sabbath), Jimi Hendrix and Steve Vai to even hip-hop artists such as Wu-Tang Clan. While he received moderate acclaim before Stadium Arcadium, this change in style gained him far more recognition than before. Frusciante's approach to guitar on Stadium Arcadium was influenced by progressive rock group the Mars Volta and R&B singer Brandy. Of Brandy, Frusciante says "she's doing something different, she's doing so many vocals that there is never a space. Whenever one voice stops, another one does something in its place. There's very little space, and there are so many vocal parts that are breathy, you don't know what you're listening to. There is so much going on, you can't hear her voice with your conscience, you have to hear it with your subconscience.[sic] Some of them have a watery sound, then metallic, she really creates a lot of dimension with her voice. I'm impressed with that." Of the Mars Volta, Kiedis states: "John's always had an understated confidence, but he likes being loud now, and part of that came from hanging out with the Mars Volta. Omar Rodríguez-López is such a rocker that John was like, 'It's time I let it all hang out.' Being at the forefront, going for the heavy blistering guitar in your face: John's always been capable of that. But he didn't feel it. Now he feels it." Rodriguez-Lopez appears on the album, performing a guitar solo on the track "Especially in Michigan". Frusciante subsequently appeared on the Mars Volta's next three studio albums and performed a few times live with them as well. Frusciante would also go on to release a joint studio album with Rodriguez-Lopez, Omar Rodriguez-Lopez & John Frusciante, in May 2010.

Frusciante also began layering his guitar playing, something he had not done before (many layered guitar parts appeared on Mother's Milk, but this was mostly because of the insistence of the producer, although it was against John's will); he also used a modular synthesizer on many songs after doing so on his 2004 album Shadows Collide with People. While Frusciante was pleased to have used the modular synthesizer on the album, he admitted that when the band began rehearsing for the tour, it was frustrating because many of the songs sounded empty without it. This meant the band had to rework many of the songs to perform them live.

That thing at the end of Wet Sand – where the guitars come in and sound like a harpsichord – they’re just the treble pickup of a Stratocaster, three tracks in harmony with one another, playing that same riff you hear in the first part of the cycle of that section. But I recorded it with the tape slowed down, so that when it’s sped up it sounds like a harpsichord.

When I went home and listened to Burning Of The Midnight Lamp by Jimi Hendrix it had the same sound and, despite the Jimi Hendrix box set saying it was a harpsichord, I’m positive it’s a guitar that’s sped up.

— John Frusciante, (Total Guitar, 2006)

Unlike By the Way, where bass player Flea was displeased with what he felt was Frusciante dominating the songwriting, Stadium Arcadium saw both Flea and Frusciante on even footing in the writing process.

According to Kiedis, the album is musically and lyrically influenced by the various relationships the band members were experiencing at the time of its conception. Kiedis states that "love and women, pregnancies and marriages, relationship struggles – those are real and profound influences on this record. And it's great, because it wasn't just me writing about the fact that I'm in love. It was everybody in the band. We were brimming with energy based on falling in love."

Kiedis recalled that the band "wanted to [release all 38 songs] on three separate discs that [would] be released in installments...something about those songs made us really like each one. However, by the time we planned to release the third installment in two years, we’ll be writing new music." This was the impetus for the band to pare those songs down to 28, a process Kiedis described as "heartwrenching." Nine of the unused songs have been released as B-sides. He explained the reasoning behind the decision to name the album Stadium Arcadium by saying that it had more "variety and verve compared to its predecessors [and] we each have things we do best and it's all in there. Everybody played their part and expressed their creativity to the max."

To date, 37 of the 38 songs recorded have been released. During pre-album interviews, many of the songs were known by alternate/working titles: "Early Eighties" ("Strip My Mind"), "Forty Detectives" and "Ghost Dance 2000" ("Hump de Bump"), "Wu-Tang" ("Dani California"), "Funkadelicish to Me" ("She's Only 18"), "Fela Funk" ("We Believe") and "Public Enemy" ("Storm in a Teacup"). The vinyl version of the album contains an alternate guitar solo on "Especially in Michigan" and also released was a promotional instrumental version of the album, mostly given to radio and TV stations for on-air play.

The album was only released on cassette in Indonesia and Malaysia, and was slightly sped up in order to get the entire contents of each disc to fit on each side of the tape, in addition to featuring slightly edited versions of "Hey" and "Desecration Smile."

=== Additional tracks ===
Stadium Arcadium outtakes
| Title | Source |
|---|---|
| "Million Miles of Water" | "Dani California" CD1 |
| "Whatever We Want" | "Dani California" CD2 |
| "Lately" | "Dani California" CD2 |
| "A Certain Someone" | "Tell Me Baby" CD1 |
| "Mercy Mercy" | "Tell Me Baby" CD2 |
| "Funny Face" | "Snow (Hey Oh)" |
| "I'll Be Your Domino" | "Snow (Hey Oh)" |
| "Joe" | "Desecration Smile" CD1 |
| "Save This Lady" | "Desecration Smile" CD2 |

== Artwork ==
Artist Storm Thorgerson, known for providing seminal album artwork for numerous bands including Pink Floyd, T. Rex, Audioslave, the Mars Volta, and Muse, was asked to create the cover art for Stadium Arcadium. Thorgerson provided at least three possible covers for the album, however, his ideas were ultimately rejected and a simple cover featuring yellow "Superman" lettering and a blue background with planets was used instead.

The inside artwork of the album featured a band portrait, another band portrait recreating the classic cover of the Odds & Sods by the Who as well as images of the band floating and on fire.

== Critical reception ==
Professional ratings
Aggregate scores
| Source | Rating |
|---|---|
| Metacritic | 73/100 |
Review scores
| Source | Rating |
| AllMusic | 3.5/5 stars |
| Entertainment Weekly | B+ |
| The Guardian | 3/5 stars |
| Los Angeles Times | 4/4 stars |
| MSN Music (Consumer Guide) | B− |
| NME | 7/10 |
| Pitchfork | 4.7/10 |
| Q | 5/5 stars |
| Rolling Stone | 4/5 stars |
| Uncut | 4/5 stars |

Stadium Arcadium received generally favorable reviews. Rolling Stone critic Brian Hiatt deemed it the band's best album to date and noted Kiedis' growth as a singer and songwriter: "the guy [Kiedis] who once yelped, 'I want to party on your pussy!' whisper-sings a gentler, though not unrelated, proposition: 'All I want is for you to be happy/And take this moment to make you my family.' The delicate 'Hard to Concentrate' is the most vulnerable Peppers tune ever—a full-on marriage proposal from Anthony Kiedis, with Flea's muted bass and John Frusciante's layered guitars slow-dancing over Afrobeat hand drums." The magazine later ranked it as the second-best album released in 2006, behind Modern Times by Bob Dylan. Q magazine said it was one of the year's best albums, while Andrew Perry of The Observer stated it was "relentless, purposeful, as moreish as McDonald's... mainstream America in excelsis." Josh Kun of Los Angeles Times wrote that "they've never sounded this good as musicians. The use of analog tape lends a raw, organic touch to the whole album and the Chili Peppers come off more assured and confident than they ever did back when they made a career out of bragging." Stephen Thomas Erlewine of AllMusic was more reserved in his praise, finding the album overproduced and self-indulgent despite the presence of "something pretty great and lean buried beneath the excess". Pitchfork critic Rob Mitchum wrote that the album "is split between slightly askew mid-tempo pop and regrettable relapses into funk and muso noodling".

In 2024, Loudwire staff elected it as the best hard rock album of 2006.

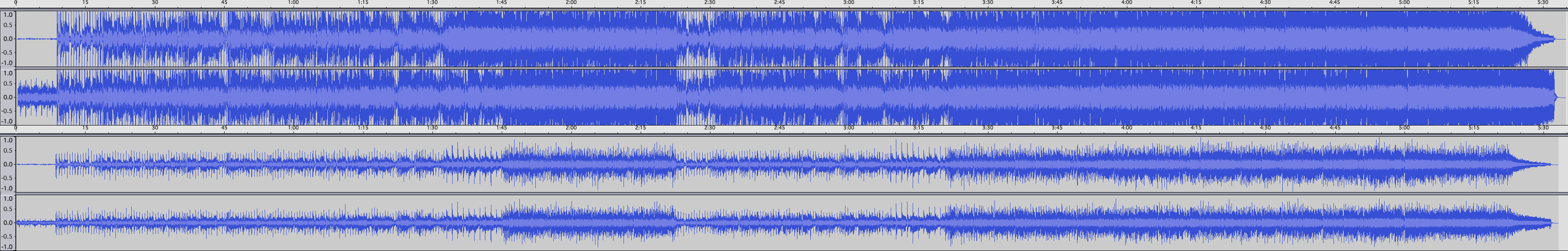
Waveform of the song "Snow (Hey Oh)", comparing the CD and LP releases.

A problem often pointed out by audiophiles is Vlado Meller's mastering for the CD release. It can be regarded as a product of the loudness war, with heavy use of dynamic range compression, and suffering of frequent clipping. The vinyl was mastered by Steve Hoffman and Kevin Gray.

== Commercial performance ==
Stadium Arcadium sold 442,000 copies in the United States in its first week and debuted at number one on the Billboard 200 making it the band's first number one debut in their career. In its second week, the album remained at number one on the Billboard 200, selling 157,000 copies (down 65 percent). In Canada, the double album debuted at #1 on the Canadian Albums Chart, selling 64,000 copies in its first week.

"Dani California" spent fourteen weeks at number one on the Billboard Alternative Songs chart and is one of three songs in the history of the chart to debut at number one.

== Tour ==
In May 2006 the Chili Peppers announced that they would be touring Europe in May through July, followed by 26 dates in the US and Canada from August to November. Josh Klinghoffer, friend of John Frusciante, and multi-instrumentalist joined the band on tour in 2007 (Klinghoffer would replace Frusciante two years later as the band's lead guitarist until 2019, after which Frusciante rejoined the band). Rolling Stone named it "Most Anticipated Summer Tour" in an online poll. The Mars Volta were the opening act. The band also headlined the Voodoo Music Festival in New Orleans.

== Track listing ==
All tracks are written by Red Hot Chili Peppers.

Jupiter
| No. | Title | Length |
|---|---|---|
| 1. | "Dani California" | 4:42 |
| 2. | "Snow (Hey Oh)" | 5:34 |
| 3. | "Charlie" | 4:37 |
| 4. | "Stadium Arcadium" | 5:15 |
| 5. | "Hump de Bump" | 3:33 |
| 6. | "She's Only 18" | 3:25 |
| 7. | "Slow Cheetah" | 5:19 |
| 8. | "Torture Me" | 3:44 |
| 9. | "Strip My Mind" | 4:19 |
| 10. | "Especially in Michigan" | 4:00 |
| 11. | "Warlocks" | 3:25 |
| 12. | "C'mon Girl" | 3:48 |
| 13. | "Wet Sand" | 5:09 |
| 14. | "Hey" | 5:39 |
| Total length: | | 62:29 |

Mars
| No. | Title | Length |
|---|---|---|
| 1. | "Desecration Smile" | 5:01 |
| 2. | "Tell Me Baby" | 4:07 |
| 3. | "Hard to Concentrate" | 4:01 |
| 4. | "21st Century" | 4:22 |
| 5. | "She Looks to Me" | 4:06 |
| 6. | "Readymade" | 4:30 |
| 7. | "If" | 2:52 |
| 8. | "Make You Feel Better" | 3:52 |
| 9. | "Animal Bar" | 5:24 |
| 10. | "So Much I" | 3:44 |
| 11. | "Storm in a Teacup" | 3:45 |
| 12. | "We Believe" | 3:36 |
| 13. | "Turn It Again" | 6:06 |
| 14. | "Death of a Martian" | 4:24 |
| Total length: | | 59:50 |

== Personnel ==
Credits adapted from AllMusic.

Red Hot Chili Peppers

- Anthony Kiedis – lead vocals
- John Frusciante – guitars, backing vocals, keyboards, synthesizer, Mellotron
- Flea – bass guitar, trumpet
- Chad Smith – drums, percussion

Additional musicians

- Natalie Baber, Mylissa Hoffman, Alexis Izenstark, Spencer Izenstark, Dylan Lerner, Kyle Lerner, Gabrielle Mosbe, Monique Mosbe, Sophia Mosbe, Isabella Shmelev, Landen Starkman, and Wyatt Starkman – background vocals on "We Believe"
- Michael Bulger – trombone on "Turn It Again"
- Lenny Castro – percussion
- Paulinho da Costa – percussion
- Richard Dodd – cello on "She Looks to Me"
- Emily Kokal – chorus vocals on "Desecration Smile"
- Billy Preston – clavinet on "Warlocks"
- Omar Rodríguez-López – guitar solo on "Especially in Michigan"
- Brad Warnaar – French horn on "Stadium Arcadium"

Recording personnel

- Rick Rubin – production
- Ryan Hewitt – mixing, engineering
- Andrew Scheps – mixing, engineering
- Dana Nielsen – engineering
- Kevin Gray – mastering (vinyl)
- Steve Hoffman – mastering (vinyl)
- Vlado Meller – mastering (CD)

Additional personnel

- Shane Jackson – assistant photography
- Gus Van Sant – art direction

== Charts ==
=== Weekly charts ===
2006 weekly chart performance for Stadium Arcadium
| Chart (2006) | Peak position |
|---|---|
| Australian Albums (ARIA) | 1 |
| Austrian Albums (Ö3 Austria) | 1 |
| Belgian Albums (Ultratop Flanders) | 1 |
| Belgian Albums (Ultratop Wallonia) | 2 |
| Canadian Albums (Billboard) | 1 |
| Croatian Albums (HDU) | 1 |
| Czech Albums (ČNS IFPI) | 1 |
| Danish Albums (Hitlisten) | 1 |
| Dutch Albums (Album Top 100) | 1 |
| European Albums (Billboard) | 1 |
| Finnish Albums (Suomen virallinen lista) | 1 |
| French Albums (SNEP) | 1 |
| German Albums (Offizielle Top 100) | 1 |
| Greek Albums (IFPI) | 1 |
| Hungarian Albums (MAHASZ) | 2 |
| Irish Albums (IRMA) | 1 |
| Italian Albums (FIMI) | 1 |
| Japanese Albums (Oricon) | 1 |
| Mexican Albums (Top 100 Mexico) | 2 |
| New Zealand Albums (RMNZ) | 1 |
| Norwegian Albums (VG-lista) | 1 |
| Polish Albums (ZPAV) | 1 |
| Portuguese Albums (AFP) | 5 |
| Scottish Albums (Official Charts) | 1 |
| South African Albums (RISA) | 4 |
| Spanish Albums (Promusicae) | 2 |
| Swedish Albums (Sverigetopplistan) | 1 |
| Swiss Albums (Schweizer Hitparade) | 1 |
| UK Albums (Official Charts) | 1 |
| UK Rock & Metal Albums (Official Charts) | 1 |
| US Billboard 200 | 1 |
| US Top Rock Albums (Billboard) | 1 |
| US Indie Store Album Sales (Billboard) | 1 |

=== Year-end charts ===
2006 year-end chart performance for Stadium Arcadium
| Chart (2006) | Position |
|---|---|
| Australian Albums (ARIA) | 8 |
| Austrian Albums (Ö3 Austria) | 1 |
| Belgian Albums (Ultratop Flanders) | 3 |
| Belgian Alternative Albums (Ultratop Flanders) | 1 |
| Belgian Albums (Ultratop Wallonia) | 14 |
| Danish Albums (Hitlisten) | 12 |
| Dutch Albums (Album Top 100) | 6 |
| European Albums (Billboard) | 5 |
| Finnish Albums (Suomen viralinen lista) | 8 |
| French Albums (SNEP) | 36 |
| German Albums (Offizielle Top 100) | 4 |
| Greek Albums (IFPI) | 12 |
| Greek Foreign Albums (IFPI) | 1 |
| Hungarian Albums (MAHASZ) | 48 |
| Irish Albums (IRMA) | 12 |
| Italian Albums (FIMI) | 12 |
| Japanese Albums (Oricon) | 35 |
| Mexican Albums (Top 100 Mexico) | 71 |
| New Zealand Albums (RMNZ) | 3 |
| South African Albums (RISA) | 19 |
| Swedish Albums (Sverigetopplistan) | 5 |
| Swedish Albums & Compilations (Sverigetopplistan) | 7 |
| Swiss Albums (Schweizer Hitparade) | 1 |
| UK Albums (OCC) | 15 |
| US Billboard 200 | 24 |
| US Tastemakers Albums (Billboard) | 3 |
| US Top Rock Albums (Billboard) | 3 |
| Worldwide Albums (IFPI) | 2 |

2007 year-end chart performance for Stadium Arcadium
| Chart (2007) | Position |
|---|---|
| Australian Albums (ARIA) | 90 |
| Austrian Albums (Ö3 Austria) | 20 |
| Dutch Albums (Album Top 100) | 27 |
| European Albums (Billboard) | 33 |
| French Albums (SNEP) | 181 |
| German Albums (Offizielle Top 100) | 47 |
| Hungarian Albums (MAHASZ) | 80 |
| Italian Albums (FIMI) | 56 |
| New Zealand Albums (RMNZ) | 32 |
| Swiss Albums (Schweizer Hitparade) | 52 |
| UK Albums (OCC) | 172 |
| US Billboard 200 | 78 |
| US Top Rock Albums (Billboard) | 18 |

== Certifications and sales ==
Certifications and sales for Stadium Arcadium
| Region | Certification | Certified units/sales |
|---|---|---|
| Argentina (CAPIF) | Platinum | 40,000^{^} |
| Australia (ARIA) | 3× Platinum | 210,000^{^} |
| Austria (IFPI Austria) | Platinum | 30,000^{*} |
| Belgium (BRMA) | Platinum | 50,000^{*} |
| Brazil (Pro-Música Brasil) | Platinum | 60,000^{*} |
| Canada (Music Canada) | 4× Platinum | 400,000^{^} |
| Denmark (IFPI Danmark) | 4× Platinum | 80,000^{‡} |
| Finland (Musiikkituottajat) | Gold | 21,159 |
| France (SNEP) | Platinum | 300,000^{*} |
| Germany (BVMI) | 3× Platinum | 600,000^{‡} |
| Greece (IFPI Greece) | Platinum | 15,000^{^} |
| Hungary (MAHASZ) | Gold | 5,000^{^} |
| Ireland (IRMA) | 4× Platinum | 60,000^{^} |
| Italy sales in 2006 | — | 180,000 |
| Italy (FIMI) sales since 2009 | Platinum | 50,000^{‡} |
| Japan (RIAJ) | 2× Platinum | 500,000^{^} |
| Netherlands (NVPI) | Platinum | 70,000^{^} |
| New Zealand (RMNZ) | 6× Platinum | 90,000^{‡} |
| Poland (ZPAV) | Platinum | 40,000^{*} |
| Portugal (AFP) | Gold | 10,000^{^} |
| Spain (Promusicae) | Gold | 40,000^{^} |
| Sweden (GLF) | Gold | 30,000^{^} |
| Switzerland (IFPI Switzerland) | 2× Platinum | 60,000^{^} |
| United Kingdom (BPI) | 3× Platinum | 900,000^{^} |
| United States (RIAA) | 4× Platinum | 4,000,000^{‡} |
Summaries
| Europe (IFPI) | 2× Platinum | 2,000,000^{*} |
^{*} Sales figures based on certification alone.^{^} Shipments figures based on certification alone.^{‡} Sales+streaming figures based on certification alone.

== Release history ==
Release history and formats for Stadium Arcadium
| Region | Date | Format |
|---|---|---|
| Germany | May 5, 2006 | CD |
| United Kingdom | May 8, 2006 | CD |
| Australia | May 9, 2006 | CD |
| Canada | May 9, 2006 | CD |
| Japan | May 9, 2006 | CD |
| Poland | May 9, 2006 | CD |
| United States | May 9, 2006 | CD |
| New Zealand | May 15, 2006 | CD |
