= Dani California =

2006 single by Red Hot Chili Peppers

Single by Red Hot Chili Peppers

from the album Stadium Arcadium
- B-side: "Million Miles of Water"; "Whatever We Want"; "Lately"
- Released: April 28, 2006
- Studio: The Mansion (Los Angeles)
- Genre: Funk rock; alternative rock; stadium rock
- Length: 4:42
- Label: Warner Bros.
- Songwriters: Flea; Frusciante; Kiedis; Smith
- Producer: Rick Rubin

Red Hot Chili Peppers singles chronology
| "Fortune Faded" (2003) | "Dani California" (2006) | "Tell Me Baby" (2006) |

Music video
- "Dani California" on YouTube

"Dani California" is a song from American rock band Red Hot Chili Peppers' ninth studio album, Stadium Arcadium (2006). The single was first made available at the iTunes Music Store and was officially released on April 28, 2006. The international radio premiere was on April 3, 2006, when Don Jantzen, from the Houston radio station KTBZ-FM, played "Dani California" continuously for his entire three-hour program.

The single peaked at number six on the Billboard Hot 100, becoming the band's third and most recent single to enter the top 10. In addition, "Dani California" became the second song (after R.E.M.'s "What's the Frequency, Kenneth?" in 1994) to debut at number one on the Billboard Modern Rock Tracks chart, staying there for 14 consecutive weeks. It also charted at number one on the Mainstream Rock chart, where it spent 12 straight weeks on top. The song won two Grammy Awards: one for Best Rock Song and the other for Best Rock Performance by a Duo or Group with Vocal. It marked the band's joint-biggest UK hit to date along with "By the Way", peaking at number two on the UK Singles Chart. Altogether, the single reached the top five in 10 countries.

== Origins and character ==
Throughout the song, lyricist Anthony Kiedis laments the early death of Dani, a poor, young Southern girl who eventually lived in California, became a mother and lived a hard, fast, unsettled life. Kiedis has commented that the character of Dani is a composite of all the women with whom he has had relationships. The song narrates much of Dani's life, starting with her birth in Mississippi and apparently culminating with her death in the badlands, by a North Dakota policeman, while en route to Minnesota.

Dani first appeared in the 1999 song "Californication", which includes the lyrics "Teenage bride with a baby inside / Gettin' high on information" although the girl's name is not specified. She was next mentioned in the Red Hot Chili Peppers' 2002 single "By the Way" as "Dani the girl". Kiedis commented: "When this funky groove came up it struck me as a perfect place to actually tell a story. It sort of revealed itself to me that it's been the same character, just kind of developing. At first I didn't realize that I was writing about the same girl."

Guitarist John Frusciante used various instruments and effects devices in order to achieve the textures and treatments used throughout the song, including Mellotron, Moog effect pedals, and a Doepfer modular synthesizer, used for the filtering and processing of pre-recorded tracks. The one-minute guitar solo at the end of the song is an adaption of Jimi Hendrix's intro to "Purple Haze", with the effects kept very close to the original.

== Reception ==
Shortly after its release, the originality of the song was questioned on the Dan Gaffney Morning Show on Delaware-based news/talk radio station WGMD 92.7 FM. Two of the station's talk show hosts, Dan Gaffney and Jared Morris, alleged that the Red Hot Chili Peppers had plagiarized Tom Petty and the Heartbreakers' 1993 hit "Mary Jane's Last Dance". To demonstrate, they presented audio snippets of both songs, both side by side and simultaneously (i.e. on top of each other) several times. They stated that the chord progression, key, and the lyrical theme of the songs (both produced by Rick Rubin) showed "startling similarities" and urged listeners to "decide for themselves."

Although the chord progressions sound similar, they do in fact differ as "Mary Jane's Last Dance" follows "Am, G, D, Am" (A Dorian mode), while "Dani California" follows "Am, G, Dm, Am" (A minor). University of Chicago musicologist Travis Jackson said the songs' chord progressions were similar, but were a "pretty standard groove" in music and not necessarily evidence of copying.

In an interview with Rolling Stone magazine, Petty denied rumors that he planned to sue the Chili Peppers and said, "I seriously doubt that there is any negative intent there. And a lot of rock & roll songs sound alike."

== Music video ==
A frame of the "Dani California" video showing Flea and Anthony Kiedis honoring funk

The music video for "Dani California" premiered on April 4, 2006. Directed by Tony Kaye, director of American History X (who was only accepted after initial choice Mark Romanek declined), the video is a quasi-chronology of the evolution of rock music; the band performs the song on a stage, but in a variety of outfits representing important figures and movements in the history of rock, with band members transformed into famous musicians.

Flea affirmed that "[The band] mainly did eras, not actual people: rockabilly, British Invasion, psychedelia, funk, glam, punk, goth, hair metal, grunge, and ourselves being the sum of all those parts." While the band's appearance was intentionally generic in each scene, obvious nods were made to certain specific artists, including Elvis Presley, the Beatles, Jimi Hendrix, Cream, Prince, Parliament-Funkadelic (as Flea was dressed like Bootsy Collins), David Bowie (as Flea was dressed like Bowie in his Ziggy Stardust persona), Slade, Sex Pistols, Misfits' Glenn Danzig, Poison, Mötley Crüe, Twisted Sister, Nirvana, and Red Hot Chili Peppers themselves. The video finishes with the Red Hot Chili Peppers as themselves, occasionally flashing back to the imitated transformed artists featured earlier in the film.

The video received seven nominations at the 2006 MTV Video Music Awards; it won the award for Best Art Direction, failing to win its six other nominations for Video of the Year, Best Group Video, Best Rock Video, Best Direction, Best Editing and Best Cinematography. The video was also nominated for an MMVA for best international video.

== Chart performance ==
"Dani California" debuted at number 24 and peaked at number six on the Billboard Hot 100 (remaining for two weeks at that position), becoming their third and last top ten hit. It's the 2nd song to debut at number one on the Modern Rock Tracks chart after R.E.M. in 1994 and before Linkin Park in 2007, remaining at the location for 14 weeks. The song also managed to achieve 28,000 units of digital sales in the song's first week of release and debuted at number 16 on the Hot Digital Songs chart. In the UK, the song fared even better, peaking at the number two spot for one week (kept off by Gnarls Barkley's "Crazy"), and eventually remaining on that chart for over 15 weeks. It also stayed 12 weeks at number one on the Mainstream Rock Tracks chart. The song also became a cross-over hit to pop and adult contemporary radio peaking number five on the Adult Top 40 chart, their 1st Top 5 and Top 10 single on the chart beating "Scar Tissue" and "Otherside," both at number 11. The song also hit number 25 on the Mainstream Top 40 chart.

The song is among the few tracks the Red Hot Chili Peppers recorded which have broken the top 10 on the Billboard Hot 100. It was a success, with "Dani California" accumulating over 500 weeks collectively on over 20 charts.

== In popular culture ==
The song is offered as a playable track in Rock Band, and was exportable to Rock Band 2 but not any future versions of the Rock Band series until a patch on November 8, 2011, made the song playable in Rock Band 3. The song is used in the two Japanese live-action films, Death Note and Death Note 2: The Last Name, both directed by Shūsuke Kaneko. In addition, "Dani California" was used in the promo for the fourth season of Sons of Anarchy and as a NASCAR AD for All Star Weekend in 2006. Red Hot Chili Peppers performed the song on January 30, 2025 at Kia Forum in Inglewood, California for FireAid to help with relief efforts for the January 2025 Southern California wildfires.

== Track listings ==
CD single 1 5439 15759-2

1. "Dani California" – 4:44
2. "Million Miles of Water" – 4:06

CD single 2 9362 42925-2

1. "Dani California" – 4:44
2. "Whatever We Want" – 4:48
3. "Lately" – 2:55

7-inch picture disc single 5439 15758-7

1. "Dani California" – 4:44
2. "Whatever We Want" – 4:48

iTunes EP

1. "Dani California" – 4:44
2. "Whatever We Want" – 4:47
3. "Lately" – 2:55
4. "Million Miles of Water" – 4:05

== Personnel ==
Red Hot Chili Peppers

- Anthony Kiedis – lead vocals
- John Frusciante – guitars, backing vocals, keyboards, synthesizers
- Flea – bass
- Chad Smith – drums

== Charts ==
=== Weekly charts ===
Weekly chart performance for "Dani California"
| Chart (2006) | Peak position |
|---|---|
| Australia (ARIA) | 8 |
| Austria (Ö3 Austria Top 40) | 7 |
| Belgium (Ultratop 50 Flanders) | 9 |
| Belgium (Ultratip Bubbling Under Wallonia) | 1 |
| Canada (Nielsen SoundScan) | 1 |
| Canada Rock (Billboard) | 1 |
| Croatia (HRT) | 1 |
| Czech Republic Airplay (ČNS IFPI) | 3 |
| Denmark (Tracklisten) | 1 |
| Europe (Eurochart Hot 100) | 3 |
| France (SNEP) | 57 |
| Germany (GfK) | 12 |
| Hungary (Rádiós Top 40) | 40 |
| Ireland (IRMA) | 7 |
| Italy (FIMI) | 4 |
| Japan (Oricon) | 38 |
| Netherlands (Dutch Top 40) | 8 |
| Netherlands (Single Top 100) | 7 |
| New Zealand (Recorded Music NZ) | 7 |
| Norway (VG-lista) | 5 |
| Scottish Singles Sales (Official Charts) | 2 |
| Slovakia Airplay (ČNS IFPI) | 41 |
| Spain (Promusicae) | 7 |
| Sweden (Sverigetopplistan) | 2 |
| Switzerland (Schweizer Hitparade) | 4 |
| UK Singles (Official Charts) | 2 |
| US Billboard Hot 100 | 6 |
| US Adult Alternative Airplay (Billboard) | 1 |
| US Adult Pop Airplay (Billboard) | 5 |
| US Alternative Airplay (Billboard) | 1 |
| US Mainstream Rock Airplay (Billboard) | 1 |
| US Pop Airplay (Billboard) | 25 |

=== Year-end charts ===
Year-end chart performance for "Dani California"
| Chart (2006) | Position |
|---|---|
| Australia (ARIA) | 54 |
| Austria (Ö3 Austria Top 40) | 38 |
| Belgium (Ultratop 50 Flanders) | 31 |
| Brazil (Crowley) | 31 |
| Canada Rock (Radio & Records) | 1 |
| Europe (Eurochart Hot 100) | 68 |
| Germany (Media Control GfK) | 92 |
| Italy (FIMI) | 34 |
| Netherlands (Dutch Top 40) | 30 |
| Netherlands (Single Top 100) | 40 |
| Sweden (Hitlistan) | 92 |
| Switzerland (Schweizer Hitparade) | 25 |
| UK Singles (OCC) | 43 |
| US Billboard Hot 100 | 23 |
| US Adult Top 40 (Billboard) | 16 |
| US Mainstream Rock Songs (Billboard) | 3 |
| US Modern Rock Tracks (Billboard) | 1 |

== Certifications ==
Certifications and sales for "Dani California"
| Region | Certification | Certified units/sales |
|---|---|---|
| Australia (ARIA) | Gold | 35,000^{^} |
| Canada (Music Canada) Ringtone | Gold | 20,000^{*} |
| Denmark (IFPI Danmark) | 2× Platinum | 180,000^{‡} |
| Italy (FIMI) (Since 2009) | Gold | 25,000^{‡} |
| Japan (RIAJ) Full-length ringtone | Platinum | 250,000^{*} |
| Japan (RIAJ) Ringtone | 2× Platinum | 500,000^{*} |
| New Zealand (RMNZ) | 4× Platinum | 120,000^{‡} |
| Spain (Promusicae) | Gold | 30,000^{‡} |
| Sweden (GLF) | Gold | 10,000^{^} |
| United Kingdom (BPI) | 2× Platinum | 1,200,000^{‡} |
| United States (RIAA) | 5× Platinum | 5,000,000^{‡} |
^{*} Sales figures based on certification alone.^{^} Shipments figures based on certification alone.^{‡} Sales+streaming figures based on certification alone.

== Release history ==
Release dates and formats for "Dani California
| Region | Date | Format(s) | Label(s) | Ref(s). |
|---|---|---|---|---|
| United States | April 3, 2006 | Triple A radio | Warner Bros. | |
| Europe | April 28, 2006 | CD | Warner Bros. | |
| United Kingdom | May 1, 2006 | CD | Warner Bros. | |
| Australia | May 8, 2006 | CD | Warner Bros. | |
| United States | May 8, 2006 | Contemporary hit radio | Warner Bros. | |
| Japan | May 10, 2006 | CD | Warner Bros. | |
