= The Mansion (recording studio) =

Mansion and recording studio in Laurel Canyon, California

The Mansion / The Houdini Estate
- Headquarters: Laurel Canyon, California

The Mansion is a four-bedroom mansion owned by music producer Rick Rubin located in the Laurel Canyon neighborhood of Los Angeles, California. Originally built in 1918, the house is famous for the successful bands who have recorded music there. Although many say that Harry Houdini lived at the mansion, no one has ever lived in the Mansion under the name "Houdini". There is confusion between The Mansion, at 2451 Laurel Canyon Blvd., and The Houdini Estate, at 2400 Laurel Canyon Blvd.

After recording Red Hot Chili Peppers' Blood Sugar Sex Magik with considerable ease and comfort, Rubin decided to use the mansion to record many of the albums he has produced, including the Red Hot Chili Peppers' Stadium Arcadium, Audioslave's Out of Exile, The Mars Volta's De-Loused in the Comatorium, Slipknot's Vol. 3: (The Subliminal Verses), Linkin Park's Minutes to Midnight and the Strokes' Reality Awaits.

Since 1991, Red Hot Chili Peppers have returned to the mansion on numerous occasions; the tracks "Fortune Faded" and "Save the Population" on 2003's Greatest Hits compilation, and more recently the group's 2006 album Stadium Arcadium were recorded there. The mansion can also be seen on the Chili Peppers' 1991 documentary Funky Monks, Linkin Park's DVD The Making of Minutes to Midnight, and in a series of eight clips uploaded to LCD Soundsystem's official YouTube channel documenting the creation of This Is Happening.

== Houdini connection ==
In 1919, Houdini rented the cottage (Note: "Not the home, which was sensationally dubbed "the Houdini mansion" when it burned in 1959, and has been rebuilt using the name "Houdini Estate.") at 2435 Laurel Canyon Boulevard in Los Angeles, while making movies for Lasky Pictures. His wife occupied it for a time after his death. It is said that Houdini did practice his tricks in the pool at 2400 Laurel Canyon Boulevard. (Note: Nor should this "house" should be confused with the "House of Houdini" which was a former Houdini home, purchased in 1908, at 278 West 113th Street, Harlem, now called Morningside Heights, New York City that also displays artifacts.)

As of 2011 the site of the cottage was a vacant lot and up for sale. The main mansion building itself was rebuilt after it was destroyed in the 1959 Laurel Canyon fire, and is now a historic venue called The Mansion. While Houdini did not likely live at the "mansion", there is some probability that his widow did.

== Recordings at the Mansion ==
Band or artist	Album(s) and/or song(s)	Year(s) of recording
Red Hot Chili Peppers	Blood Sugar Sex Magik	1991
Guns N' Roses	November Rain	1991
Marilyn Manson	Holy Wood (In the Shadow of the Valley of Death)	1999 – 2000
American Head Charge	The War of Art	2000 – 2001
The Mars Volta	De-Loused in the Comatorium	2002 – 2003
Jay-Z	"99 Problems"	2003
Red Hot Chili Peppers	"Fortune Faded" and "Save the Population" from Greatest Hits	2003
Slipknot	Vol. 3: (The Subliminal Verses)	2003
System of a Down	Mezmerize & Hypnotize	2004
Ours	Dancing for the Death of an Imaginary Enemy	2005
Audioslave	Out of Exile	2005
Red Hot Chili Peppers	Stadium Arcadium	2005
Linkin Park	Minutes to Midnight	2006 – 2007
Maroon 5	It Won't Be Soon Before Long	2006 – 2007
LCD Soundsystem	This Is Happening	2009 – 2010
Lorde	iHeart Radio Secret Sessions	2017
Major Lazer feat. Tove Lo	"Blow That Smoke"	2018
Aluna & KAYTRANADA feat. Rema	"The Recipe"	2020
Masego & Don Toliver	"Mystery Lady"	2020
Young Thug feat. Travis Barker	NPR tiny desk (home) concert	2021
Dua Lipa	"Houdini"	2023
Turnstile	Never Enough	2024 – 2025
The Strokes	Reality Awaits	2022 – 2026
