= Off the Map (video) =

Video by Red Hot Chili Peppers
- Released: 2001
- Recorded: 2000
- Genres: Alternative rock, funk rock
- Length: 1:09:29
- Label: Warner Bros.

Red Hot Chili Peppers chronology
What Hits!? (1992)	Off the Map (2001)	Live at Slane Castle (2003)

Live releases video chronology
Psychedelic Sexfunk Live from Heaven (1990)	Off the Map (2001)	Live at Slane Castle (2003)

Off the Map is a VHS and DVD released by the American alternative rock band Red Hot Chili Peppers in 2001, two years following the release of their seventh studio album, Californication. The video runs as a full concert but is edited to include parts from various concerts from the band's 2000s North American tour.

While being the first official live release from the band, it also is their only live CD/DVD to have live performances of songs from the album Uplift Mofo Party Plan.

During "Me and My Friends", Foo Fighters members Dave Grohl and Taylor Hawkins prank Chad Smith as revenge for Smith's pranks prior to the show, causing the band to screw up at the end.

In 2003, Off the Map was certified platinum in Australia. In 2008, it was certified Gold in United States. The material was also certified Gold in Brazil and United Kingdom.

== Track listing ==
1. Opening
2. "Around the World"
3. "Give It Away"
4. "Usually Just a T-Shirt #3"
5. "Scar Tissue"
6. "Suck My Kiss"
7. "If You Have to Ask"
8. "Subterranean Homesick Blues"
9. "Otherside"
10. "Blackeyed Blonde"
11. "Pea"
12. "Blood Sugar Sex Magik"
13. "Easily"
14. "What Is Soul?"
15. (The Jam)
16. "Fire"
17. "Californication"
18. "Right on Time"
19. "Under the Bridge"
20. "Me and My Friends"

=== Bonus footage ===
- Pre-show backstage footage
- Interview footage
- Additional live footage:
1. "Skinny Sweaty Man"
2. "I Could Have Lied"
3. "Parallel Universe"
4. "Sir Psycho Sexy"
5. "Search and Destroy"

== Personnel ==
Red Hot Chili Peppers

- Anthony Kiedis – lead vocals
- Flea – bass guitar, backing vocals (lead vocals on "Pea")
- John Frusciante – guitar, backing vocals (lead vocals on "Usually Just a T-Shirt #3")
- Chad Smith – drums

Additional personnel

- Louie Mathieu – road production coordinator
- Dave Rat – recording engineer
- Jim Scott – mixing
- Dick Rude – concert director, producer and photographer
- Arnaud Gerardy – video editor
- Robert Fisher – design
- Anthony Glasser – additional photography
- Tony Woolliscroft – photography

== Certifications ==
Region	Certification	Certified units/sales
Australia (ARIA)	2× Platinum	30,000^{^}
Brazil (Pro-Música Brasil)	Gold	25,000^{*}
United Kingdom (BPI)	Gold	25,000^{*}
United States (RIAA)	Gold	50,000^{^}
^{*} Sales figures based on certification alone.^{^} Shipments figures based on certification alone.
