= Californication Tour =

1999–2000 concert tour by Red Hot Chili Peppers

Californication World Tour
- Tour by Red Hot Chili Peppers
- Promotional poster for September 13, 2000 show
- Associated album: Californication
- Start date: June 18, 1999
- End date: September 22, 2000
- Legs: 6
- No. of shows: 91 in North America; 26 in Europe; 5 in South America; 5 in Asia; 12 in Oceania; 139 total

Red Hot Chili Peppers concert chronology
- One Hot Minute Tour (1995–1997); Californication Tour (1999–2000); Red Hot Chili Peppers 2001 Tour (2001)

The Californication Tour was a worldwide concert tour by Red Hot Chili Peppers to support their seventh studio album Californication which saw the return of guitarist John Frusciante who rejoined the band in 1998 after quitting six years earlier.

A DVD documenting the tour titled Off the Map, which was made up of footage from different shows, was released in 2001.

== Overview ==
=== 1998 tour ===
Following the firing of Dave Navarro in early 1998, Flea felt the only way the band could continue was if John Frusciante returned to the band. Frusciante quit the band in 1992 during the height of their success on their Blood Sugar Sex Magik Tour and spiraled into a heavy drug addiction which almost took his life. Flea always remained in contact, and he helped talk Frusciante into admitting himself to Las Encinas Drug Rehabilitation Center in January 1998. He concluded the process in February of that year and began renting a small apartment in Silver Lake, California. Singer Anthony Kiedis was surprised and thought there was no way Frusciante would ever want to work with him as the two still had unresolved personal problems from when Frusciante quit in 1992. With Frusciante free of his addictions and ailments, Kiedis and Flea thought it was an appropriate time to invite him back. In April 1998, when Flea visited him at his home and asked him to rejoin the band, Frusciante began sobbing and said "nothing would make me happier in the world." Flea decided to contact Kiedis and have him meet with Frusciante to try and resolve any personal problems that the two might have had. Flea was relieved to find out that both had no bad blood towards each other and were once again excited to make music together. Within the week and, for the first time in six years, the reunited foursome jump-started the newly reunited Red Hot Chili Peppers. With the band ready to make their comeback, a short 12 date tour was scheduled from June until September. On June 5, 1998, and for the first time since 1992 with Frusciante, gave an acoustic performance at KBLT Radio Studios in Los Angeles which was hosted by Mike Watt and featured Keith Morris as the DJ. The highlights included the very first performance of "Soul to Squeeze", solo songs by Flea and Frusciante and Morris joining the band on vocals (he originally filled in for Kiedis for one show in 1986) for a cover of Black Flag's "Nervous Breakdown". Seven days later the band gave their first official public performance at the 9:30 Club in Washington, D.C. The band was also in town to perform at the Tibetan Freedom Concert however their set was cancelled due to a severe thunderstorm that left one girl severely burned by a lightning strike (Kiedis would visit her in the hospital). Pearl Jam decided to cut their set short so the Chili Peppers could perform a quick three song set. Shows in New York City. Chicago (a special private show for Miller Genuine Draft contest winners), California and Las Vegas followed with a nine date tour of Central America being cancelled so the band could focus on recording their next album Californication.

This brief 1998 tour marked the official live debuts of songs that would eventually be featured the following year on Californication such as "Emit Remmus", "I Like Dirt", "Parallel Universe" and "Scar Tissue". "Bunker Hill", a song originally intended for the album but not released until 2003's Greatest Hits, was also performed for the first time during this tour; it has never been performed since.

=== Californication tour ===
The Californication Tour was the band's biggest to date and most successful helping breaking them through to an even wider audience and seeing their supporting album achieve their largest worldwide sales. The anticipation for the tour was very high due to the recent return of Frusciante the previous year. The tour started in May 1999, Red Hot with a promotional tour also known as the "Stop the Hate" Tour. These concerts were only for high school students that wrote an essay on how to stop violence in schools. The world tour featured a large mixture of music from the band's entire catalog, although the band's previous album, 1995's One Hot Minute was only represented with Flea's song, "Pea" and nothing from that album other than that song has been performed with Frusciante. Frusciante, at the time, claimed to have never heard the album. The tour featured a heavy dose of the Californication album and twelve years later, all of the album's songs except for "Porcelain" have been performed live. The tour saw the band headline Woodstock '99 although a lot of controversy came following their set due to the band's performance of the Jimi Hendrix classic, "Fire" (a request made by Hendrix's sister) which some in the media said helped instigate riots in the crowd and bonfires being lit although the band at the time had no knowledge of the chaos about to breakout and claimed if they did, the song would not have been performed.

This tour marked the last time "Backwoods", "Green Heaven" and "Subterranean Homesick Blues" have been performed live.

== Songs performed ==
Originals

The Red Hot Chili Peppers

"Green Heaven"

"Mommy Where's Daddy?"

"Police Helicopter"

Freaky Styley

"Blackeyed Blonde"

"Freaky Styley"

"Jungle Man" (tease)

"Yertle Trilogy" (A performance of "Yertle the Turtle" and "Freaky Styley" back-to-back segueing into jams of the songs "Cosmic Slop" by Parliament, "Atomic Dog" by George Clinton, "Cholly (Funk Getting Ready To Roll!)" by Funkadelic, as well as occasionally featuring "History Lesson – Part II" by The Minutemen,"Untitled #2" by John Frusciante and "Not Great Men" by Gang of Four.)

The Uplift Mofo Party Plan

"Backwoods"

"Me and My Friends”

"Organic Anti-Beat Box Band"

"Party on Your Pussy" (tease)

"Skinny Sweaty Man"

"Subterranean Homesick Blues" (Bob Dylan)

The Abbey Road E.P.

"Fire" (Jimi Hendrix)

Mother's Milk

"Higher Ground" (Stevie Wonder)

Blood Sugar Sex Magik

"Blood Sugar Sex Magik"

"Breaking the Girl"

"Give It Away"

"I Could Have Lied"

"If You Have to Ask"

"My Lovely Man"

"The Greeting Song" (tease)

"The Power of Equality"

"Sir Psycho Sexy"

"Suck My Kiss"

"They're Red Hot" (Robert Johnson)

"Under the Bridge"

One Hot Minute

"Pea"

“Warped” (tease)

Californication

"Around the World”

"Californication"

"Easily"

"Emit Remmus"

"I Like Dirt"

"Otherside"

"Parallel Universe"

"Right on Time"

"Road Trippin'"

"Savior"

"Scar Tissue"

"This Velvet Glove"

Other (non-album songs)

"Gong Li" (tease)

"Search and Destroy" (The Stooges)

"Soul to Squeeze"

Cover songs (used as intros or during jams unless otherwise noted)
- "Arc" (Neil Young)
- "Autobahn" (Kraftwerk)
- "Back in Black" (AC/DC)
- "Been Insane" (John Frusciante)
- "Boys Don't Cry" (The Cure)
- "Boyz-n-the-Hood" (Eazy-E)
- "Bring It on Home" (Led Zeppelin)
- "Communication Breakdown" (Led Zeppelin)
- "Cosmic Slop" (Parliament Funkadelic)
- "Five Years" (David Bowie)
- "Four Sticks" (Led Zeppelin)
- "The Guns of Brixton" (The Clash)
- "London Calling" (The Clash)
- "Master and Servant" (Depeche Mode)
- "The Metro" (Berlin)
- "Nuthin' But a "G" Thang" (Dr. Dre and Snoop Dogg)
- "Ocean Size" (Jane's Addiction) (soundchecked)
- "Ogre Battle" (Queen)
- "Pinhead" (The Ramones) (entire song)
- "Pot Sharing Tots" (George Clinton)
- "Ramble On" (Led Zeppelin)
- "Rapper's Delight" (Sugar Hill Gang)
- "Red Hot Mama" (Parliament Funkadelic)
- "Religion" (Public Image Ltd)
- "Sammy Hagar Weekend" (Thelonious Monster)
- "Sheena Is a Punk Rocker" (The Ramones) (entire song)
- "Song for Toni" (John Frusciante)
- "Superstition" (Stevie Wonder)
- "Trouble" (Cat Stevens) (entire song)
- "Untitled #3" (John Frusciante)
- "Untitled #11" (John Frusciante)
- "Your Gonna Get Yours" (Public Enemy)
- "Your Pussy's Glued to a Building on Fire" (John Frusciante)
- "What Is Soul?" (Parliament Funkadelic) (entire song)
- "World Full of Nothing" (Depeche Mode)

== Tour dates ==
Date	City	Country	Venue	Opening Acts
North America
May 23, 1999^{[A]}	St. Louis	United States	Riverport Amphitheatre	
June 18, 1999^{[B]}	Mountain View	United States	Shoreline Amphitheatre	
June 19, 1999^{[C]}	Irvine	United States	Irvine Meadows Amphitheatre	
July 25, 1999^{[D]}	Rome	United States	Griffiss Air Force Base	
Europe
August 14, 1999	Moscow	Russia	Red Square	
August 18, 1999^{[E]}	Wiesen	Austria	Festivalgelände Wiesen	
August 20, 1999^{[F]}	Cologne	Germany	RAF Butzweilerhof	
August 21, 1999^{[G]}	Copenhagen	Denmark	Club Danmark Hallen	
August 22, 1999^{[G]}	Stockholm	Sweden	Maritime Museum	
August 25, 1999	Nîmes	France	Arena of Nîmes	Silverchair
August 26, 1999	Paris	France	Zénith de Paris	Silverchair
August 27, 1999^{[H]}	Kiewit	Belgium	Kempische Steenweg	
August 29, 1999^{[I]}	Reading	England	Little John's Farm on Richfield Avenue	
August 30, 1999^{[J]}	Leeds	England	Temple Newsam	
September 4, 1999^{[K]}	Verona	Italy	Arena di Verona	
South America
October 2, 1999	Santiago	Chile	Estación Mapocho	Puya
October 3, 1999	Santiago	Chile	Estación Mapocho	Puya
October 5, 1999	Buenos Aires	Argentina	Luna Park	Puya
October 6, 1999	Buenos Aires	Argentina	Luna Park	Puya
October 8, 1999	São Paulo	Brazil	Credicard Hall	Puya
North America
October 11, 1999	Mexico City	Mexico	Palacio de los Deportes	Puya
Europe
October 29, 1999	Helsinki	Finland	Hartwall Areena	The Rasmus
October 30, 1999	Helsinki	Finland	Hartwall Areena	The Rasmus
November 1, 1999	Oslo	Norway	Oslo Spektrum	Stereophonics
November 3, 1999	Gothenburg	Sweden	Scandinavium	Stereophonics
November 4, 1999	Hamburg	Germany	Alsterdorfer Sporthalle	Muse
November 6, 1999	London	England	Wembley Arena	Feeder
November 8, 1999	Berlin	Germany	Arena Berlin	Stereophonics
November 10, 1999	The Hague	Netherlands	Statenhal	Stereophonics
November 11, 1999	Böblingen	Germany	Sporthalle Böblingen	Stereophonics
November 13, 1999	Zürich	Switzerland	Hallenstadion	Stereophonics
November 14, 1999	Milan	Italy	Fila Forum	Stereophonics
November 16, 1999	Paris	France	Palais Omnisports de Paris-Bercy	Foo Fighters, Muse
November 18, 1999	Bordeaux	France	Patinoire de Mériadeck	AFI, Muse
November 19, 1999	Badalona	Spain	Palau Municipal d'Esports de Badalona	
November 21, 1999	Leganés	Spain	Plaza de Toros La Cubierta	
November 22, 1999	Lisbon	Portugal	Pavilhão Atlântico	Da Weasel
North America
December 26, 1999	San Diego	United States	Cox Arena at Aztec Bowl	311, The Bicycle Thief
December 28, 1999	Daly City	United States	Cow Palace	311, The Bicycle Thief
December 29, 1999	Sacramento	United States	ARCO Arena	Primus
December 31, 1999	Inglewood	United States	Great Western Forum	311, The Bicycle Thief
Asia
January 8, 2000	Tokyo	Japan	Nippon Budokan	
January 9, 2000	Tokyo	Japan	Nippon Budokan	
January 11, 2000	Tokyo	Japan	Nippon Budokan	
January 13, 2000	Yokohama	Japan	Pacifico Yokohama Exhibition Hall	
January 14, 2000	Osaka	Japan	Osaka-jō Hall	
Oceania
January 21, 2000^{[L]}	Auckland	New Zealand	Ericsson Stadium	
January 23, 2000^{[L]}	Gold Coast	Australia	Parklands Gold Coast	
January 24, 2000	Brisbane	Australia	Brisbane Entertainment Centre	
January 26, 2000^{[L]}	Sydney	Australia	Sydney Showground Main Arena	
January 27, 2000	Sydney	Australia	Sydney Entertainment Centre	
January 28, 2000	Sydney	Australia	Sydney Entertainment Centre	
January 30, 2000^{[L]}	Melbourne	Australia	Royal Melbourne Showgrounds	
February 1, 2000	Melbourne	Australia	Melbourne Sports and Entertainment Centre	
February 2, 2000	Melbourne	Australia	Melbourne Sports and Entertainment Centre	
February 4, 2000^{[L]}	Adelaide	Australia	Royal Adelaide Showgrounds	
February 6, 2000^{[L]}	Perth	Australia	Bassendean Oval	
February 7, 2000	Perth	Australia	Perth Entertainment Centre	
North America
March 24, 2000	Minneapolis	United States	Target Center	Foo Fighters
March 25, 2000	Madison	United States	Dane County Coliseum	Foo Fighters
March 27, 2000	Carbondale	United States	SIU Arena	Foo Fighters
March 28, 2000	Champaign	United States	Assembly Hall	Foo Fighters
March 30, 2000	Fairborn	United States	Nutter Center	Foo Fighters
March 31, 2000	Columbus	United States	Value City Arena	Foo Fighters
April 2, 2000	Amherst	United States	Mullins Memorial Center	Foo Fighters
April 3, 2000	Albany	United States	Pepsi Arena	Foo Fighters
April 5, 2000	University Park	United States	Bryce Jordan Center	Foo Fighters
April 6, 2000	Roanoke	United States	Roanoke Civic Center	Foo Fighters
April 8, 2000	Bloomington	United States	Assembly Hall	Foo Fighters
April 9, 2000	Lexington	United States	Rupp Arena	Foo Fighters
April 11, 2000	Knoxville	United States	Thompson–Boling Arena	Foo Fighters
April 12, 2000	Chattanooga	United States	McKenzie Arena	Foo Fighters
April 25, 2000	Omaha	United States	Omaha Civic Auditorium	Foo Fighters
April 26, 2000	Iowa City	United States	Carver–Hawkeye Arena	Foo Fighters
April 28, 2000	Columbia	United States	Hearnes Center	Foo Fighters
April 29, 2000	Oklahoma City	United States	Myriad Convention Center Arena	Foo Fighters
May 1, 2000	Little Rock	United States	Barton Coliseum	Foo Fighters
May 2, 2000	Austin	United States	Frank Erwin Center	Foo Fighters
May 4, 2000	New Orleans	United States	Lakefront Arena	Foo Fighters
May 5, 2000	Pensacola	United States	Pensacola Civic Center	Foo Fighters
May 7, 2000	Greenville	United States	BI-LO Center	Foo Fighters
May 8, 2000	Norfolk	United States	Norfolk Scope	Foo Fighters
May 10, 2000	Baltimore	United States	Baltimore Arena	Foo Fighters
May 11, 2000	Wilkes-Barre	United States	Northeastern Pennsylvania Civic Arena	Foo Fighters
May 13, 2000	Providence	United States	Providence Civic Center	Foo Fighters
May 14, 2000	Portland	United States	Cumberland County Civic Center	Foo Fighters
May 27, 2000	George	United States	The Gorge Amphitheatre	Foo Fighters, Kool Keith
May 28, 2000	Vancouver	Canada	General Motors Place	Foo Fighters, Kool Keith
May 31, 2000	West Valley City	United States	E Center	Foo Fighters, Kool Keith
June 2, 2000	Phoenix	United States	Desert Sky Pavilion	Foo Fighters, Kool Keith
June 3, 2000	Albuquerque	United States	University Arena	Foo Fighters, Kool Keith
June 5, 2000	Houston	United States	Compaq Center	Foo Fighters, Kool Keith
June 6, 2000	Dallas	United States	Starplex Amphitheatre	Foo Fighters, Kool Keith
June 8, 2000	Atlanta	United States	Lakewood Amphitheatre	Foo Fighters, Kool Keith
June 9, 2000	Charlotte	United States	Blockbuster Pavilion	Foo Fighters, Kool Keith
June 11, 2000	Raleigh	United States	Alltel Pavilion	Foo Fighters, Kool Keith
June 12, 2000	Nashville	United States	Starwood Amphitheatre	Foo Fighters, Kool Keith
June 14, 2000	West Palm Beach	United States	Mars Music Amphitheater	Foo Fighters, Kool Keith
June 15, 2000	Orlando	United States	TD Waterhouse Centre	Foo Fighters, Kool Keith
June 23, 2000^{[M]}	Seattle	United States	Memorial Stadium	
June 28, 2000	Bonner Springs	United States	Sandstone Amphitheater	Foo Fighters
June 29, 2000	Maryland Heights	United States	Riverport Amphitheater	Foo Fighters
July 1, 2000	Moline	United States	The MARK of the Quad Cities	Foo Fighters, Blonde Redhead
July 2, 2000^{[N]}	Milwaukee	United States	Marcus Amphitheater	
July 4, 2000	Louisville	United States	Freedom Hall	Foo Fighters, Blonde Redhead
July 5, 2000	Grand Rapids	United States	Van Andel Arena	Foo Fighters, Blonde Redhead
July 7, 2000	Noblesville	United States	Deer Creek Music Center	Foo Fighters, Blonde Redhead
July 8, 2000	Cuyahoga Falls	United States	Blossom Music Center	Foo Fighters, Blonde Redhead
July 10, 2000	Bristow	United States	Nissan Pavilion	Foo Fighters, Blonde Redhead
July 11, 2000	Camden	United States	Blockbuster-Sony Music Entertainment Centre	Foo Fighters, Blonde Redhead
July 13, 2000	Hartford	United States	Meadows Music Theater	Foo Fighters, Blonde Redhead
July 14, 2000	Holmdel Township	United States	PNC Bank Arts Center	Foo Fighters, Blonde Redhead
July 16, 2000	Mansfield	United States	Tweeter Center for the Performing Arts	Foo Fighters, Blonde Redhead
July 17, 2000	Hershey	United States	Hersheypark Stadium	Foo Fighters, Blonde Redhead
July 30, 2000	Saratoga Springs	United States	Saratoga Performing Arts Center	Stone Temple Pilots
July 31, 2000	Holmdel Township	United States	PNC Bank Arts Center	Stone Temple Pilots
August 2, 2000	Tinley Park	United States	New World Music Theater	Stone Temple Pilots
August 3, 2000	Cincinnati	United States	Riverbend Music Center	Stone Temple Pilots
August 5, 2000^{[O]}	Greensburg	United States	Westmoreland Fairgrounds	Stone Temple Pilots
August 7, 2000	Clarkston	United States	Pine Knob Music Theatre	Stone Temple Pilots
August 8, 2000	Clarkston	United States	Pine Knob Music Theatre	Stone Temple Pilots
August 10, 2000	Charleston	United States	Charleston Civic Center	Stone Temple Pilots
August 12, 2000	Wantagh	United States	Jones Beach Theater	Stone Temple Pilots
August 13, 2000	Wantagh	United States	Jones Beach Theater	Stone Temple Pilots
August 15, 2000	Darien	United States	Darien Lake Performing Arts Center	Stone Temple Pilots
August 16, 2000	Toronto	Canada	Molson Amphitheatre	Stone Temple Pilots
August 18, 2000	Quebec City	Canada	Colisée de Québec	Stone Temple Pilots
August 19, 2000	Montreal	Canada	Bell Centre	Stone Temple Pilots
September 1, 2000	Irvine	United States	Verizon Wireless Amphitheatre	Stone Temple Pilots
September 2, 2000	Irvine	United States	Verizon Wireless Amphitheatre	Stone Temple Pilots
September 4, 2000	Chula Vista	United States	Coors Amphitheatre	Stone Temple Pilots
September 9, 2000	Mountain View	United States	Shoreline Amphitheatre	Stone Temple Pilots
September 10, 2000	Wheatland	United States	AutoWest Amphitheatre	Stone Temple Pilots
September 12, 2000	Fresno	United States	Selland Arena	Stone Temple Pilots
September 13, 2000	Paradise, Nevada	United States	Thomas & Mack Center	Stone Temple Pilots
September 15, 2000	Casper	United States	Casper Events Center	Stone Temple Pilots
September 16, 2000	Greenwood Village	United States	Comfort Dental Amphitheatre	Stone Temple Pilots
September 18, 2000	Nampa	United States	Idaho Center Amphitheater	Stone Temple Pilots
September 19, 2000	Spokane	United States	Spokane Arena	Stone Temple Pilots
September 21, 2000	Portland	United States	Memorial Coliseum	Stone Temple Pilots
September 22, 2000	Seattle	United States	KeyArena	Stone Temple Pilots

Festivals and other miscellaneous performances

^{A} This concert was a part of "BFD"
^{B} This concert was a part of the "KROQ Weenie Roast"
^{C} This concert was a part of "Woodstock 1999"
^{D} This concert was a part of the "Wiesen Festival"
^{E} This concert was a part of "Bizarre-Festival"
^{F} These concerts were a part of "Probably '99"
^{G} This was a part of "Pukkelpop"

^{H} This concert was a part of the "Reading Festival"
^{I} This concert was a part of the "Leeds Festival"
^{J} These concerts were a part of "Big Day Out"
^{K} This concert was a part of the "EMP Museum's Grand Opening Celebration"
^{L} This concert was a part of "Summerfest"
^{M} This concert was a part of the "Rolling Rock Town Fair"

Cancellations and rescheduled shows

October 4, 1999	Buenos Aires, Argentina	Luna Park	Rescheduled to October 6, 1999

=== Box office score data ===
Venue	City	Tickets sold / available	Gross revenue
Cow Palace	Daly City	13,501 / 15,000 (90%)	$472,535
Carver–Hawkeye Arena	Iowa City	13,014 / 13,014 (100%)	$390,420
Frank Erwin Center	Austin	13,404 / 13,404 (100%)	$469,140
Norfolk Scope	Norfolk	11,000 / 11,000 (100%)	$379,225
The Gorge Amphitheatre	George	20,000 / 20,000 (100%)	$719,045
Pine Knob Music Theatre	Clarkston	31,720 / 31,720 (100%)	$1,010,537
Verizon Wireless Amphitheatre	Irvine	32,264 / 32,490 (99%)	$1,070,625
Coors Amphitheatre	Chula Vista	12,616 / 19,689 (64%)	$483,670
TOTAL		147,519 / 156,317 (94%)	$4,995,197

== Opening acts ==
- Stereophonics (Europe, select dates)
- Muse (Europe/North America, select dates)
- Feeder (London—November 6)
- 311 (North America, select dates)
- The Bicycle Thief (North America, select dates)
- Foo Fighters (North America, select dates)
- Kool Keith (North America, select dates)
- Blonde Redhead (North America, select dates)
- Stone Temple Pilots (North America, select dates)
- Fishbone (North America, select dates)
- Primus (Sacramento)
- Puya (South America)

== Personnel ==
- Anthony Kiedis – lead vocals
- Flea – bass, backing vocals
- John Frusciante – guitar, backing vocals
- Chad Smith – drums
