= Live at Slane Castle (Red Hot Chili Peppers video) =

Video by Red Hot Chili Peppers
- Released: November 17, 2003
- Recorded: August 23, 2003
- Venue: Slane Castle grounds
- Genre: Alternative rock, funk rock
- Length: 142:00
- Label: Warner Bros.
- Director: Nick Wickham
- Producer: Emer Patten

Red Hot Chili Peppers chronology
Off the Map (2001)	Live at Slane Castle (2003)	Greatest Hits and Videos (2003)

Live releases chronology
Off the Map (2001)	Live at Slane Castle (2003)	iTunes Originals – Red Hot Chili Peppers (2006)

Live at Slane Castle is a Red Hot Chili Peppers concert video released on November 17, 2003, two years after the release of their last concert DVD, Off the Map. The concert, which took place on August 23, 2003, was their first headlining show at Slane Castle in Ireland having previously performed there in August 2001 opening for U2. The show was one of the biggest ever for the band with 80,000 fans in attendance with tickets selling out in under two and a half hours. Foo Fighters also played as one of several supporting acts, and have their own DVD footage of the concert. Other acts supporting on the day included Queens of the Stone Age, PJ Harvey, Feeder and Morcheeba.

The show was also the basis for an episode of Love, Death & Robots, directed by David Fincher and released in 2025. The episode depicts the Red Hot Chili Peppers as marionettes playing the song "Can't Stop" at Slane Castle.

== Track listing ==
1. "Opening Titles" John Frusciante, Flea and Chad Smith begin with an improvised jam
2. "By the Way"
3. "Scar Tissue"
4. "Around the World "
5. "Maybe" (cover by John Frusciante)
6. "Universally Speaking"
7. "Parallel Universe"
  - The intro is "Latest Disgrace" by Fugazi from the album Red Medicine
8. "The Zephyr Song"
9. "Throw Away Your Television"
10. "Havana Affair" (Ramones cover)
11. "Otherside"
  - "I Feel Love" (cover by John Frusciante) was played after "Otherside" but was cut from DVD release
12. "Purple Stain"
13. "Don't Forget Me"
14. "Right on Time"
  - The intro is "London Calling" by The Clash from the 1979 album London Calling
  - "Soul to Squeeze" was played after "Right on Time" but was cut from DVD release due to Frusciante breaking a string during the guitar solo
15. "Can't Stop"
16. "Venice Queen"
17. "Give It Away"
  - Trumpet/Drum duet with Flea and Chad
18. "Californication"
  - Segued from an improvised intro by Flea and Frusciante
19. "Under the Bridge"
20. "The Power of Equality"
21. "Closing Credits"

== Personnel ==
- Anthony Kiedis - lead vocals
- Flea - bass, trumpet, backing vocals
- John Frusciante - guitar, backing vocals
- Chad Smith - drums

== Charts ==
Chart (2003)	Peak position
Hungarian DVDs Chart	6
Norwegian Music DVDs Chart	7
Swedish Music DVDs Chart	12
US Music Videos Chart	22

Chart (2004)	Peak position
Australian DVDs Chart	12
Austrian Music DVDs Chart	5
Dutch Music DVDs Chart	20

== Certifications ==
Region	Certification	Certified units/sales
Argentina (CAPIF)	Platinum	8,000^{^}
Australia (ARIA)	4× Platinum	60,000^{^}
Brazil (Pro-Música Brasil)	Gold	25,000^{*}
Canada (Music Canada)	Platinum	10,000^{^}
France (SNEP)	Platinum	20,000^{*}
New Zealand (RMNZ)	2× Platinum	10,000^{^}
United Kingdom (BPI)	2× Platinum	100,000^{*}
United States (RIAA)	Platinum	100,000^{^}
^{*} Sales figures based on certification alone.^{^} Shipments figures based on certification alone.
