= List of awards and nominations received by Red Hot Chili Peppers =

Red Hot Chili Peppers awards and nominations
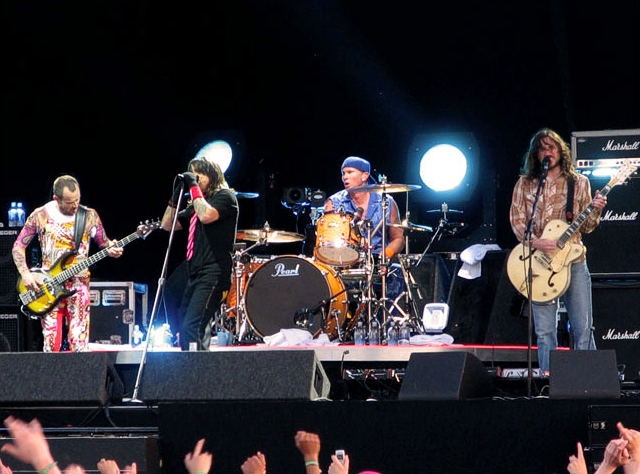
- Red Hot Chili Peppers in a 2006 concert.
Awards and nominations
Award	Wins	Nominations
American Music Awards	3	10
Billboard	2	5
Brit	4	4
Grammy	3	12
Juno	0	2
MTV VMA	10	32
Kerrang! Awards	0	4

Totals (Note: Certain award groups do not simply award one winner. They acknowledge several different recipients, have runners-up, and have third place. Since this is a specific recognition and is different from losing an award, runner-up mentions are considered wins in this award tally. For simplification and to avoid errors, each award in this list has been presumed to have had a prior nomination.)
- Wins: 37
- Nominations: 90

The Red Hot Chili Peppers are an alternative rock band formed in 1983 in Los Angeles, California. They have received 37 awards and 90 nominations, including four Grammy Awards, 30 nominations for MTV Music Video Awards (including Video of the Year for "Under the Bridge") and the Michael Jackson Video Vanguard Award. In 2022, they received the Global Icon Award from MTV.

The albums Blood Sugar Sex Magik and Californication were included in the 2023 list of Rolling Stone's 500 Greatest Albums of All Time, placing at numbers 186 and 286, respectively. The band holds the record for most no.1 singles (15), most cumulative weeks at no.1 (91) and most top 10 songs (28) on the Billboard Alternative Songs chart.

On April 14, 2012, the band was inducted by Chris Rock into the Rock and Roll Hall of Fame. The members inducted were Flea, Chad Smith, John Frusciante, Jack Irons, Anthony Kiedis, Josh Klinghoffer, Cliff Martinez and Hillel Slovak. Klinghoffer became the youngest inductee at 32, passing Stevie Wonder, who was inducted at 38. In 2022, the Red Hot Chili Peppers were awarded a star on the Hollywood Walk of Fame.

== Awards and nominations ==
Name of the award ceremony, year presented, category, nominee(s) of the award, and the result of the nomination
Award ceremony	Year	Nominee(s)/work(s)	Category	Result	Ref.
American Music Awards	1993	Red Hot Chili Peppers	Favorite Heavy Metal/Hard Rock Artist	Nominated	
American Music Awards	1993	"Under the Bridge"	Favorite Pop/Rock Single	Nominated	
American Music Awards	2000	Red Hot Chili Peppers	Favorite Alternative Artist	Won	
American Music Awards	2001	Red Hot Chili Peppers	Favorite Alternative Artist	Nominated	
American Music Awards	2006	Red Hot Chili Peppers	Favorite Alternative Artist	Won	
American Music Awards	2006	Stadium Arcadium	Favorite Pop/Rock Album	Nominated	
American Music Awards	2006	Red Hot Chili Peppers	Favorite Pop/Rock Band/Duo/Group	Won	
American Music Awards	2022	Unlimited Love	Favorite Rock Album	Nominated	
American Music Awards	2022	Red Hot Chili Peppers	Favorite Rock Artist	Nominated	
American Music Awards	2022	"Black Summer"	Favorite Rock Song	Nominated	
Billboard Music Awards	2000	Red Hot Chili Peppers	Best Alternative Group	Nominated	
Billboard Music Awards	2006	Red Hot Chili Peppers	Modern Rock Artist of the Year	Won	
Billboard Music Awards	2006	"Dani California"	Modern Rock Single of the Year	Won	
Billboard Music Awards	2006	Stadium Arcadium	Rock Album of the Year	Nominated	
Billboard Music Awards	2006	"Dani California"	Rock Single of the Year	Nominated	
Billboard Music Video Awards	2000	"Californication"	Best Modern Rock Clip of the Year	Won	
Blockbuster Entertainment Awards	2001	Red Hot Chili Peppers	Favorite Group - Rock	Nominated	
Brit Awards	2000	Red Hot Chili Peppers	International Group	Won	
Brit Awards	2003	By the Way	International Album	Won	
Brit Awards	2003	Red Hot Chili Peppers	International Group	Won	
Brit Awards	2007	Red Hot Chili Peppers	International Group	Won	
California Music Awards	2003	By the Way	Outstanding Pop/Rock Album	Won	
California Music Awards	2004	Red Hot Chili Peppers	California Favorite	Won	
Clear Top 10 Awards	2003	Red Hot Chili Peppers	Amazing International Hitmaker	Nominated	
ECHO Music Awards	2003	By the Way	Best International Rock/Pop Group	Won	
ECHO Music Awards	2007	Stadium Arcadium	International Pop/Rock Group of the Year	Won	
GAFFA Awards	1993	Red Hot Chili Peppers	Band	Nominated	
GAFFA Awards	1995	Red Hot Chili Peppers	Foreign Band	Nominated	
GAFFA Awards	1995	One Hot Minute	Foreign Album	Nominated	
GAFFA Awards	1995	One Hot Minute	Foreign Cover	Nominated	
GAFFA Awards	1999	Red Hot Chili Peppers	Foreign Band	Nominated	
GAFFA Awards	1999	Red Hot Chili Peppers	90s Foreign Name	Nominated	
GAFFA Awards	1999	Californication	Foreign Band	Nominated	
GAFFA Awards	1999	"Scar tissue"	Foreign Hit	Nominated	
GAFFA Awards	1999	"Scar tissue"	Foreign Video	Nominated	
GAFFA Awards	2000	Red Hot Chili Peppers	Best Foreign Band	Nominated	
GAFFA Awards	2002	By the Way	Best Foreign Album	Nominated	
GAFFA Awards	2002	By the Way	Best Foreign Song	Nominated	
GAFFA Awards	2006	Stadium Arcadium	Best Foreign Album	Nominated	
GAFFA Awards	2006	Red Hot Chili Peppers	Best Foreign Band	Nominated	
GAFFA Awards	2006	"Dani California"	Best Foreign Song	Nominated	
GAFFA Awards	2022	Red Hot Chili Peppers	International Band of the Year	Nominated	
Global Awards	2023	Red Hot Chili Peppers	Best Group	Nominated	
Global Awards	2023	Red Hot Chili Peppers	Best Indie Act	Nominated	
Grammy Awards	1991	"Higher Ground"	Best Rock Performance by a Duo or Group with Vocal	Nominated	
Grammy Awards	1993	"Give It Away"	Best Hard Rock Performance with Vocal	Won	
Grammy Awards	1993	"Under the Bridge"	Best Rock Performance by a Duo or Group with Vocal	Nominated	
Grammy Awards	1996	"Blood Sugar Sex Magik"	Best Hard Rock Performance with Vocal	Nominated	
Grammy Awards	2000	Californication	Best Rock Album	Nominated	
Grammy Awards	2000	"Scar Tissue"	Best Rock Vocal Performance by a Duo or Group with Vocal	Nominated	
Grammy Awards	2001	"Californication"	Best Rock Performance by a Duo or Group with Vocal	Nominated	
Grammy Awards	2007	Stadium Arcadium	Album of the Year	Nominated	
Grammy Awards	2007	Stadium Arcadium	Best Rock Album	Won	
Grammy Awards	2007	"Dani California"	Best Rock Vocal Performance by a Duo or Group with Vocal	Won	
Grammy Awards	2007	"Dani California"	Best Short Form Music Video	Nominated	
Grammy Awards	2012	I'm with You	Best Rock Album	Nominated	
Hong Kong Top Sales Music Awards	2002	By the Way	Top 10 Best Selling Foreign Albums	Won	
Hong Kong Top Sales Music Awards	2004	Greatest Hits	Top 10 Best Selling Foreign Albums	Won	
Hong Kong Top Sales Music Awards	2006	Stadium Arcadium	Top 10 Best Selling Foreign Albums	Won	
Hungarian Music Awards	2003	By the Way	International Rock Album of the Year	Won	
Hungarian Music Awards	2007	Stadium Arcadium	International Rock Album of the Year	Won	
Hungarian Music Awards	2017	The Getaway	Best Foreign Pop Album	Nominated	
Hungarian Music Awards	2017	The Getaway	Modern Pop/Rock Album of the Year	Nominated	
Hungarian Music Awards	2018	The Getaway	Best Foreign Pop Album	Nominated	
Hungarian Music Awards	2018	The Getaway	Pop/Rock Album of the Year	Nominated	
iHeartRadio Music Awards	2017	"Dark Necessities"	Alternative Rock Song of the Year	Nominated	
iHeartRadio Music Awards	2017	Red Hot Chili Peppers	Rock Artist of the Year	Nominated	
iHeartRadio Music Awards	2017	"Dark Necessities"	Rock Song of the Year	Nominated	
iHeartRadio Music Awards	2023	Red Hot Chili Peppers	Alternative Artist of the Year	Won	
iHeartRadio Music Awards	2023	"Black Summer"	Alternative Song of the Year	Nominated	
iHeartRadio Music Awards	2023	Red Hot Chili Peppers	Best Duo/Group of the Year	Nominated	
iHeartRadio Music Awards	2023	Red Hot Chili Peppers	Rock Artist of the Year	Nominated	
iHeartRadio Music Awards	2023	"Black Summer"	Rock Song of the Year	Won	
Japan Gold Disc Awards	2003	By the Way	International Rock & Pop Album of the Year	Won	
Japan Gold Disc Awards	2004	Greatest Hits	International Rock & Pop Album of the Year	Won	
Japan Gold Disc Awards	2007	Stadium Arcadium	International Best 3 Albums	Won	
Japan Gold Disc Awards	2007	"Dani California"	International Best 3 Songs by Download	Won	
Japan Gold Disc Awards	2007	International Song of the Year by Download	International Best 3 Songs by Download	Won	
Juno Awards	1993	Red Hot Chili Peppers	International Entertainer of the Year	Nominated	
Juno Awards	2007	Stadium Arcadium	International Album of the Year	Nominated	
Kerrang! Awards	2003	Red Hot Chili Peppers	Best International Band	Nominated	
Kerrang! Awards	2003	Red Hot Chili Peppers	Best Songwriter	Won	
Kerrang! Awards	2004	Red Hot Chili Peppers	Best Band on the Planet	Nominated	
Kerrang! Awards	2004	Red Hot Chili Peppers	Best Live Band	Nominated	
Meteor Ireland Music Awards	2002	Red Hot Chili Peppers	Best Performance by a Visiting Act	Won	
Meteor Ireland Music Awards	2003	By the Way	Best International Album	Won	
Meteor Ireland Music Awards	2003	Lansdowne Road	Best Visiting Live Performance	Won	
Meteor Ireland Music Awards	2004	Slane Castle	Best Live Performance	Won	
MOJO Awards	2004	Red Hot Chili Peppers	Maverick Award	Won	
MTV Australia Video Music Awards	2007	Stadium Arcadium	Album of the Year	Nominated	
MTV Australia Video Music Awards	2007	Red Hot Chili Peppers	Best Group	Won	
MTV Video Music Brazil Awards	2007	Red Hot Chili Peppers	Best International Artist	Won	
MTV Europe Music Awards	1999	Californication	Best Album	Nominated	
MTV Europe Music Awards	1999	Red Hot Chili Peppers	Best Rock	Nominated	
MTV Europe Music Awards	2000	Red Hot Chili Peppers	Best Rock	Won	
MTV Europe Music Awards	2002	Red Hot Chili Peppers	Best Live Act	Won	
MTV Europe Music Awards	2002	Red Hot Chili Peppers	Best Rock	Won	
MTV Europe Music Awards	2006	Stadium Arcadium	Best Album	Won	
MTV Europe Music Awards	2006	Red Hot Chili Peppers	Best Group	Nominated	
MTV Europe Music Awards	2006	Red Hot Chili Peppers	Best Rock	Nominated	
MTV Europe Music Awards	2006	"Dani California"	Best Song	Nominated	
MTV Europe Music Awards	2011	Red Hot Chili Peppers	Best Live Act	Nominated	
MTV Europe Music Awards	2011	Red Hot Chili Peppers	Best Rock	Nominated	
MTV Europe Music Awards	2012	Red Hot Chili Peppers	Best World Stage Performance	Nominated	
MTV Europe Music Awards	2016	Red Hot Chili Peppers	Best Rock	Nominated	
MTV Europe Music Awards	2022	Red Hot Chili Peppers	Best Rock	Nominated	
MTV Video Music Awards	1990	"Higher Ground"	Best Group Video	Nominated	
MTV Video Music Awards	1990	"Higher Ground"	Best Post-Modern Video	Nominated	
MTV Video Music Awards	1990	"Higher Ground"	Breakthrough Video	Nominated	
MTV Video Music Awards	1992	"Give it Away"	Best Alternative Video	Nominated	
MTV Video Music Awards	1992	"Give it Away"	Best Art Direction in a Video	Won	
MTV Video Music Awards	1992	"Give it Away"	Best Cinematography in a Video	Nominated	
MTV Video Music Awards	1992	"Give it Away"	Best Direction in a Video	Nominated	
MTV Video Music Awards	1992	"Give it Away"	Best Editing in a Video	Nominated	
MTV Video Music Awards	1992	"Under the Bridge"	Best Group Video	Nominated	
MTV Video Music Awards	1992	"Give it Away"	Breakthrough Video	Won	
MTV Video Music Awards	1992	"Under the Bridge	Video of the Year	Nominated	
MTV Video Music Awards	1992	"Under the Bridge	Viewer's Choice	Won	
MTV Video Music Awards	1996	"Warped"	Best Editing in a Video	Nominated	
MTV Video Music Awards	1999	www.redhotchilipeppers.com	Best Artist Website	Won	
MTV Video Music Awards	2000	"Californication"	Best Art Direction in a Video	Won	
MTV Video Music Awards	2000	"Californication"	Best Direction in a Video	Won	
MTV Video Music Awards	2000	"Californication"	Best Group Video	Nominated	
MTV Video Music Awards	2000	"Californication"	Best Special Effects in a Video	Nominated	
MTV Video Music Awards	2000	Red Hot Chili Peppers	Michael Jackson Video Vanguard Award	Won	
MTV Video Music Awards	2000	"Californication"	Video of the Year	Nominated	
MTV Video Music Awards	2002	"By the Way"	Best Direction in a Video	Nominated	
MTV Video Music Awards	2006	"Dani California"	Best Art Direction in a Video	Won	
MTV Video Music Awards	2006	"Dani California"	Best Cinematography in a Video	Nominated	
MTV Video Music Awards	2006	"Dani California"	Best Direction in a Video	Nominated	
MTV Video Music Awards	2006	"Dani California"	Best Editing in a Video	Nominated	
MTV Video Music Awards	2006	"Dani California"	Best Group Video	Nominated	
MTV Video Music Awards	2006	"Dani California"	Best Rock Video	Nominated	
MTV Video Music Awards	2006	"Dani California"	Video of the Year	Nominated	
MTV Video Music Awards	2022	Red Hot Chili Peppers	Global Icon Award	Won	
MTV Video Music Awards	2022	Red Hot Chili Peppers	Group of the Year	Nominated	
MTV Video Music Awards	2022	"Black Summer"	Best Rock	Won	
MTV Video Music Awards	2023	"Tippa My Tongue"	Best Rock	Nominated	
MTV Video Music Awards Japan	2003	"By the Way"	Best Rock Video	Won	
MTV Video Music Awards Japan	2007	Stadium Arcadium	Best Album of the Year	Won	
MTV Video Music Awards Japan	2007	"Dani California"	Best Group Video	Won	
MTV Video Music Awards Japan	2007	"Dani California"	Best Video of the Year	Won	
MTV Video Music Awards Japan	2012	"The Adventures of Rain Dance Maggie"	Best Rock Video	Won	
MTV Video Music Awards Japan	2016	"Dark Necessities"	Best Rock Video	Won	
MTV Video Music Awards Latin America	2002	Red Hot Chili Peppers	Best Rock Artist, International	Won	
MTV Video Music Awards Latin America	2006	Red Hot Chili Peppers	Best Rock Artist, International	Nominated	
mtvU Woodie Awards	2006	Red Hot Chili Peppers	Alumni Woodie	Nominated	
MuchMusic Video Awards	2000	"Californication"	Best International Video	Won	
MuchMusic Video Awards	2000	"Californication"	Favorite International Group	Nominated	
MuchMusic Video Awards	2006	"Dani California"	Best International Group	Nominated	
MuchMusic Video Awards	2007	"Dani California"	Best International Video – Group	Nominated	
MuchMusic Video Awards	2007	"Dani California"	People's Choice: Favorite International Group	Nominated	
My VH1 Music Awards	2000	"Otherside"	Song of the Year	Nominated	
My VH1 Music Awards	2000	"Otherside"	Video of the Year	Nominated	
My VH1 Music Awards	2001	Red Hot Chili Peppers	Best Live Act	Nominated	
My VH1 Music Awards	2001	Red Hot Chili Peppers	Best Stage Spectacle	Nominated	
My VH1 Music Awards	2001	Red Hot Chili Peppers	Group of the Year	Nominated	
My VH1 Music Awards	2001	Californication	Must-Have Album	Won	
My VH1 Music Awards	2001	"Californication"	Pushing the Envelope Video	Won	
Nickelodeon Kids' Choice Awards	2001	Red Hot Chili Peppers	Favorite Band/Group	Won	
Nickelodeon Kids' Choice Awards	2007	Red Hot Chili Peppers	Favorite Band/Group	Won	
NRJ Music Awards	2007	Stadium Arcadium	Best International Album of the Year	Won	
NRJ Radio Awards	2001	Red Hot Chili Peppers	Best International Group	Won	
NRJ Radio Awards	2001	"Otherside"	Best International Song	Won	
NRJ Radio Awards	2003	Red Hot Chili Peppers	Best International Group	Won	
People's Choice Awards	2007	Red Hot Chili Peppers	Favorite Group	Nominated	
People's Choice Awards	2012	Red Hot Chili Peppers	Favorite Band	Nominated	
Premios 40 Principales	2006	Red Hot Chili Peppers	Mejor Artista Internacional	Nominated	
Q Awards	2004	Red Hot Chili Peppers	Best Act in the World	Won	
Q Awards	2004	Red Hot Chili Peppers	Best Live Act	Nominated	
Q Awards	2006	Red Hot Chili Peppers	Best Act in the World Today	Nominated	
Q Awards	2006	Red Hot Chili Peppers	Best Live Act	Nominated	
Radio Music Awards	2005	Red Hot Chili Peppers	Artist of the Year/Alternative and Active Rock Radio	Nominated	
Teen Choice Awards	2005	Red Hot Chili Peppers	Choice Music: Rock Group	Nominated	
TMF Awards Belgium	2007	"Dani California"	Best Rock International	Won	
World Music Awards	2006	Red Hot Chili Peppers	World's Best Rock Group	Nominated	
Žebřík Music Awards	1995	One Hot Minute	Best International Album	Nominated	
Žebřík Music Awards	1995	"My Friends"	Best International Song	Nominated	
Žebřík Music Awards	1995	"Warped"	Best International Video	Nominated	
Žebřík Music Awards	1996	Red Hot Chili Peppers	Best International Enjoyment	Nominated	
Žebřík Music Awards	1999	Californication	Best International Album	Won	
Žebřík Music Awards	1999	Red Hot Chili Peppers	Best International Group	Won	
Žebřík Music Awards	1999	Flea	Best International Instrumentalist	Nominated	
Žebřík Music Awards	1999	Anthony Kiedis	Best International Male	Nominated	
Žebřík Music Awards	1999	"Scar Tissue"	Best International Song	Nominated	
Žebřík Music Awards	1999	"Otherside"	Best International Song	Nominated	
Žebřík Music Awards	1999	Red Hot Chili Peppers	Best International Surprise	Nominated	
Žebřík Music Awards	2000	Californication	Best International Album	Nominated	
Žebřík Music Awards	2000	Red Hot Chili Peppers	Best International Group	Nominated	
Žebřík Music Awards	2000	Flea	Best International Instrumentalist	Nominated	
Žebřík Music Awards	2000	"Californication"	Best International Song	Nominated	
Žebřík Music Awards	2000	"Californication"	Best International Video	Nominated	
Žebřík Music Awards	2001	Red Hot Chili Peppers	Best International Group	Nominated	
Žebřík Music Awards	2002	By the Way	Best International Album	Won	
Žebřík Music Awards	2002	Red Hot Chili Peppers	Best International Group	Won	
Žebřík Music Awards	2002	Anthony Kiedis	Best International Male	Nominated	
Žebřík Music Awards	2002	Anthony Kiedis	Best International Personality	Nominated	
Žebřík Music Awards	2002	"By the Way"	Best International Song	Won	
Žebřík Music Awards	2002	"The Zephyr Song"	Best International Song	Nominated	
Žebřík Music Awards	2002	"By the Way"	Best International Video	Won	
Žebřík Music Awards	2002	"The Zephyr Song"	Best International Video	Nominated	
Žebřík Music Awards	2003	Red Hot Chili Peppers	Best International Group	Won	
Žebřík Music Awards	2003	Anthony Kiedis	Best International Male	Nominated	
Žebřík Music Awards	2003	"Otherside"	Best International Video	Nominated	
Žebřík Music Awards	2004	Red Hot Chili Peppers	Best International Group	Nominated	

== Other accolades and tributes ==
Other accolades and tributes to the Red Hot Chili Peppers
Year	Award	Title
1994	Rock and Roll Hall of Fame's "500 Songs That Shaped Rock"	"Give It Away"
1999	Spin's Top 90 Albums of the '90s	Blood Sugar Sex Magik (#58)
1999	Q Magazine 90 Albums of the '90s	Blood Sugar Sex Magik (#58)
2002	VH-1's 100 Sexiest Artists	Ranked #72
2003	Rolling Stone's The 100 Greatest Albums of the Nineties	Blood Sugar Sex Magik (#19)
2003	The 500 Greatest Albums of All Time	Blood Sugar Sex Magik (#310), Californication (#399)
2004	California Music Awards	Favorite of California
2006	Q Magazine Top 20 Albums from the Lifetime of Q (1986–2006)	By the Way (#16)
2006	Guitar World The 100 Greatest Guitar Albums of All Time	Blood Sugar Sex Magik (#18)
2006	Chainsaw Awards	Killer Video ("Dani California")
2006	U Choose 40 (NZ)	Best '90s ANTHEMS (NZ) Song ("Under the Bridge")
2007	U Choose 40 (NZ)	Best Big Day Out (NZ) Artist ("Give it Away")
2007	U Choose 40 (NZ)	Take Me Back To The '90s (NZ) Song ("Under The Bridge")
2007	Polish Frederic Chopin and Platinum Disc Award	For Stadium Arcadium
2007	Rock and Roll Hall of Fame The Definitive 200: Top 200 Albums of All-Time	Blood Sugar Sex Magik (#88), Californication (#92)
2009	VH-1's 100 Greatest Hard Rock Songs	"Give It Away" (#50)
2009	Consequence of Sound Top 100 Albums of the 2000	By the Way (#63)
2010	Galgalatz Greatest Songs of the '00s	"Californication" (#1)
2011	VH-1's 100 Greatest Songs of the '00s	"Californication" (#44)
2012	The 500 Greatest Albums of All Time (revised)	Blood Sugar Sex Magik (#310), Californication (#401)
2012	Rock and Roll Hall of Fame	Class of 2012 inductees
2012	Ultimate Classic Rock Top 100 '90s Rock albums	Blood Sugar Sex Magik, Californication
2018	1001 Albums You Must Hear Before You Die	Blood Sugar Sex Magik, Californication
2020	The 500 Greatest Albums of All Time (revised)	Blood Sugar Sex Magik (#186), Californication (#286)
2022	Hollywood Walk of Fame	Awarded their own star in March 2022
