= Californication =

Californication may refer to:

- Californication (word), an expression that refers to the influx of Californians into various western states in the U.S.
- Californication (album), a 1999 album by the Red Hot Chili Peppers
  - "Californication" (song), the title track and a single from the album
  - Californication Tour, worldwide concert tour following the album release
- Californication (TV series), an American television series

== See also ==
- "Californicatin", a song on You're Gettin' Even While I'm Gettin' Odd (1984), the last album by The J. Geils Band
