= Slane Festival =

Recurring Irish concert

Coordinates: 53.70917°N 6.55986°W

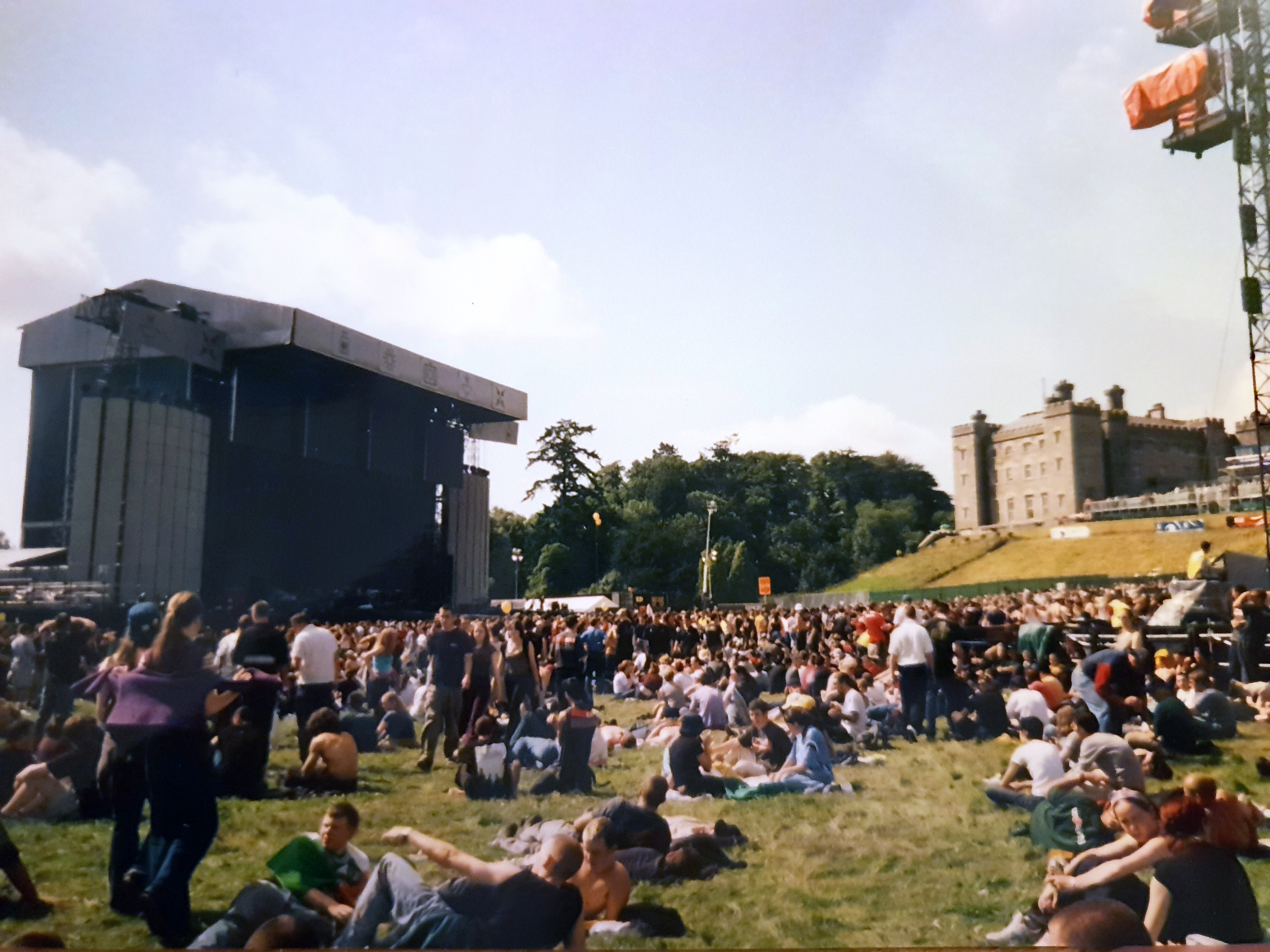
- Fans gathering early in the day for the 25 August 2001 Slane Concert
- Genre: Rock
- Dates: Various dates during the Summer months
- Locations: Slane Castle, Slane, County Meath, Ireland
- Years active: 1981–present

The Slane Festival (often referred to as Slane) is a recurring concert held most years since 1981 on the grounds of Slane Castle on the outskirts of Slane in County Meath, Ireland. The castle is owned by The 8th Marquess Conyngham, who was known by the courtesy title the Earl of Mount Charles from 1974 until 2009. Slane lies between Navan and Drogheda, about 45 km northwest of Dublin. Concerts typically occur on a Saturday in August, from 12:00 to 22:00. The sloping grounds of Slane Castle form a natural amphitheatre which is ideal for concerts. As many as 70,000–110,000 people usually attend. One of the venue boundaries is the River Boyne. Two people died while trying to swim the river to gain free access to R.E.M.'s concert in 1995.

Aiken Promotions invited artists such as David Bowie, Bob Dylan, Queen, The Rolling Stones, and Bruce Springsteen to perform during the 1980s. 2001 and 2013 are the only years in which two concerts were held in the same year. In 2001, both concerts were headlined by U2. In 2013, the first concert was headlined by Bon Jovi and the second by Eminem, who had controversially cancelled his 2005 Slane appearance after entering drug rehabilitation.

The most recent Slane Festival took place on 18 and 19 July 2025, headlined by Luke Combs.

== Multiple appearances ==
Guns N' Roses, the Rolling Stones and U2 are the only bands to have headlined the event more than once, and U2 have played twice in one year. Thin Lizzy are the only band to headline and come back as a support act. Several other acts, listed below, have supported a headliner and returned as a headliner themselves.

Act	Years
Guns N' Roses	1992, 2017
Foo Fighters	2003, 2015
Oasis	1995, 2009, 2027
Red Hot Chili Peppers	2001, 2003
Robbie Williams	1998, 1999
The Rolling Stones	1982, 2007
Stereophonics	1999, 2002
Thin Lizzy	1981, 2011
U2	1981, 1983, 2001 (twice)

Some acts, listed below, have appeared more than once but never as a headline act:

Act	Years
Ash	2001^{1}, 2015
Big Country	1983, 1987
James	1993, 1998
Dara	2000, 2001^{1}
Moby	2000, 2001^{1}
The Charlatans	2002, 2007

^{1. The second of two concerts that occurred in this year.}

== List of Slane lineups ==
=== 1980s ===
The first Slane Festival was held on 16 August 1981 by the Earl of Mount Charles (as The 8th Marquess Conyngham was then known). Concerts followed each year until 1987. The seven concerts of the 1980s were headlined respectively by Thin Lizzy, The Rolling Stones, U2, Bob Dylan, Bruce Springsteen, Queen and David Bowie. For the third concert in 1983, headlined for the first time by U2, Slane Castle was refused permission to hold a concert, so it was held in the Phoenix Park Racecourse in Dublin on 14 August 1983, the only occasion it has been held outside Slane. U2 appeared at Slane in 1981 and 1983, whilst in 1984 Bono performed a duet with Bob Dylan during the latter's encore. This was the last appearance by a member of U2 on the Slane stage until their unique double-headliner in 2001. Thus, Bono has appeared at Slane on a total of five occasions, three of these being in the first four concerts.

==== 1981, 16 August ====
- Mama's Boys
- U2 - October Tour
- Hazel O'Connor's Megahype
- Rose Tattoo
- Sweet Savage
- The Bureau
- Thin Lizzy (headliner)

==== 1982, 24 July ====
- The J. Geils Band
- The Chieftains
- George Thorogood and the Destroyers
- The Rolling Stones (headliner)

==== 1983, 14 August ====
This year, the concert was held at the Phoenix Park Racecourse in Dublin.

- Perfect Crime
- Steel Pulse
- Big Country
- Eurythmics
- Simple Minds
- U2 - War Tour (headliner)
- after the show the fans went on to sing 40 for over 15 minutes

==== 1984, 8 July ====
- In Tua Nua
- UB40
- Santana
- Bob Dylan (headliner) with guests Carlos Santana, Van Morrison, and Bono during encores.

==== 1985, 1 June ====
- Bruce Springsteen and the E Street Band played their debut Irish concert in front of 100,000 people, and performed for nearly three hours with no support acts.

While Springsteen sang The River, footage of the nearby River Boyne was shown on video screens; the footage was retained for the rest of his tour. Elvis Costello and members of Spandau Ballet and U2 were the then Lord Mount Charles's guests who enjoyed smoked salmon and champagne on the day.

==== 1986 ====
- The Hits
- Chris Rea
- The Fountainhead
- The Bangles
- Queen (headliner)

==== 1987 ====
- Aslan
- Big Country
- The Groove
- David Bowie (headliner)

=== 1990s ===
After a five-year absence, the longest since the event began in 1981, Slane Festival returned in 1992. The five concerts of the 1990s were headlined respectively by Guns N' Roses, Neil Young, R.E.M., The Verve and Robbie Williams. The 1995 concert, headlined by R.E.M., was notable for the death of someone who attempted to swim the nearby River Boyne to reach the concert area. The same concert marked the debut of Oasis on the Slane stage; they returned in 2009 to headline the event. The 1998 event was headlined by The Verve, their last appearance in Ireland until Oxegen 2008; in 1998 the band appeared alongside special guests Manic Street Preachers and also Robbie Williams who would return the following year to headline. Stereophonics played support in 1999 and returned to headline in 2002.

==== 1992 ====
- My Little Funhouse
- Faith No More
- Guns N' Roses (headliner)

==== 1993 ====
- The Blue Angels
- 4 Non Blondes
- James
- Saw Doctors
- Van Morrison
- Pearl Jam
- Neil Young (headliner)

==== 1995 ====
On 22 July 1995, R.E.M. played Slane on their first concert following Mike Mills's appendectomy. They were supported by Oasis, whose album (What's the Story) Morning Glory? would be released 3 months later and would return to headline the event in 2009. One fan threw a rock at the stage as Oasis prepared to play "Roll with It". This provoked Liam Gallagher to say, "If you don't like it, go fucking hang yourself". In 2009, this performance was described as being by "a lairy mob with attitude and half a dozen memorable songs to their credit".

The following performed at Slane Festival in 1995:

- Luka Bloom
- Spearhead
- Belly
- Sharon Shannon
- Oasis
- R.E.M. (headliner)

==== 1998 ====
- Finlay Quaye
- Junkster
- James
- The Seahorses
- Robbie Williams
- Special Guests Manic Street Preachers
- The Verve (headliner)

==== 1999 ====
28 August 1999

- Simon Carmody
- David Gray
- Gomez
- Placebo
- Happy Mondays
- Stereophonics
- Robbie Williams (headliner)

=== 2000s ===
The eight concerts of the 2000s were headlined respectively by Bryan Adams, U2 (twice), Stereophonics, Red Hot Chili Peppers, Madonna, The Rolling Stones and Oasis. Unusually, two concerts were held during 2001 (the Taoiseach asked the Minister for the Environment to fast-track some new legislation to allow the second concert to happen), both headlined by U2 and both featuring an entirely different set of support acts that brought the Slane debuts of Coldplay, Nelly Furtado, Ash, Kelis, The Walls and JJ72 whilst offering returns to Moby and Dara. Red Hot Chili Peppers also appeared for the first time and would return to headline the 2003 event.

The 2005 concert was intended to centre on rap instead of rock music, but Eminem cancelled his appearance (due on 17 September that year with support from 50 Cent, D-12, Obie Trice, Lloyd Banks, Young Buck, Olivia, Atlanta's Stat Quo and Flipsyde) after the event sold out. The promoter, MCD Productions, sought damages in the High Court. The resultant two-year break in 2005 and 2006 was followed by a return to Slane by The Rolling Stones, only the second artist after U2 to headline the event in two different years, and marking the twenty-fifth anniversary of their first appearance in 1982. Henry Conyngham's delay in the picking of suitable acts led to no concert in 2008; however Oasis headlined the final concert of Slane's third decade in 2009 with support from The Prodigy, Kasabian, Glasvegas and The Blizzards.

==== 2000 ====
- Macy Gray
- Muse
- Eagle-Eye Cherry
- Dara
- Screaming Orphans
- Melanie C
- Moby
- Bryan Adams (headliner)

==== 2001 ====
U2's headlining appearance sold out in 45 minutes. The first concert occurred the week after Bono's father died. The second concert coincided with the 2002 FIFA World Cup qualification – UEFA Group 2 match between the Republic of Ireland and the Netherlands, and was shown between Nelly Furtado and Ash at the request of fans. The second show was also filmed for the live video U2 Go Home: Live from Slane Castle, Ireland.

===== First concert =====
25 August 2001

- Relish
- Red Hot Chili Peppers - Californication Tour
- Coldplay
- Kelis
- JJ72
- U2 - Elevation Tour (headliner)

===== Second concert =====
1 September 2001

- Moby with Ardal O'Hanlon
- Ash (replacement for Foo Fighters)
- Nelly Furtado
- The Walls
- Dara
- U2 - Elevation Tour (headliner)

==== 2002 ====
Saturday 24 August 2002

- Ocean Color Scene
- Nickelback
- Counting Crows
- Doves
- The Revs
- The Charlatans, special guests
- Stereophonics (headliner)

==== 2003 ====
Saturday 23 August 2003

The Red Hot Chili Peppers concert was filmed for the live video Live at Slane Castle.

- Halite
- Morcheeba
- Feeder
- PJ Harvey
- Queens of the Stone Age
- Foo Fighters
- Red Hot Chili Peppers - By the Way World Tour (headliner)

==== 2004 ====
The Madonna concert at Slane was compared to a football match by one manager, Johnny McDonnell. The Irish Times selected "This is the big time, it's like Madonna coming to Slane" as one of its quotes of that year.

- The Darkness
- Iggy Pop and the Stooges
- Paul Oakenfold
- Madonna (headliner)

==== 2007 ====
The Irish Independent described The Rolling Stones playing to "a mostly middle-aged crowd who were content to stand back, shielded from the rain in their wax jackets, and let the concert wash over them".

- Frankie Gavin
- Tinariwen
- The Hold Steady
- The Charlatans
- The Rolling Stones (headliner, in front of 68,647 people)

==== 2009 ====
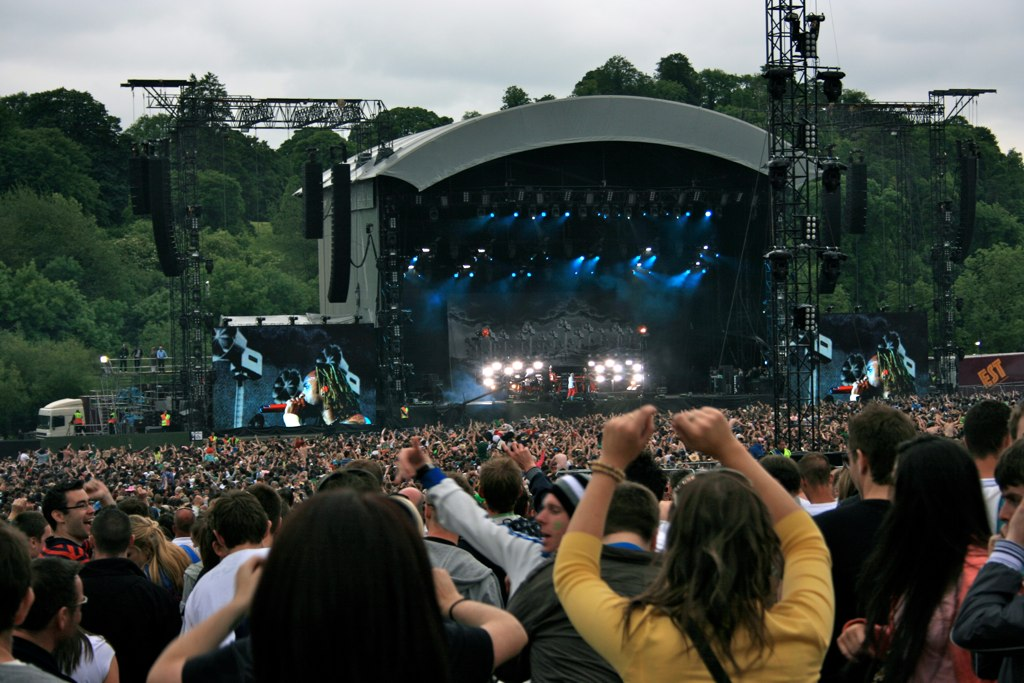
Oasis playing Slane in 2009

Oasis were joined by family members, including their mother Peggy, for the show. They began their performance with "Rock 'n' Roll Star" and finished with "Live Forever" and then returned for an encore of "Don't Look Back in Anger", "Falling Down", "Champagne Supernova" and "I Am the Walrus". Liam Gallagher shouted at the fans: "Slane Castle, you've been fucking biblical". Oasis split up two months later.

Several Irish celebrities attended the concert, including footballers Gary Kelly, Stephen Ireland and John O'Shea and solicitor Gerald Kean.

Ten people were detained on public order offences throughout the day of the concert, including two people who were arrested on suspicion of drunk driving. MCD Productions asked fans to report any problems after complaints regarding transport facilities. Fiach Kelly, writing in The Irish Independent, reported on the "yoof element" where "you could be forgiven for thinking you had arrived at a rather large teenage disco".

- The Blizzards
- Glasvegas
- Kasabian
- The Prodigy
- Oasis (headliner)

=== 2010s ===
==== 2010 ====
There was no concert in 2010. Henry Conyngham had written in an Evening Herald column in February that Slane 2010 would take place in August and that it would involve an "international artist" but that he was still organising the event with Denis Desmond. However, he said during an interview in April on RTÉ Radio that there would not be a concert that year.

==== 2011 ====
Kings of Leon played what was announced by the band onstage as their longest set ever.

- The Whigs
- Mona
- Thin Lizzy
- White Lies
- Elbow
- Kings of Leon (headliner)

==== 2012 ====
In April 2012, Slane Castle's official Facebook page announced there would be no concert in 2012. The message read: "Good Morning guys, Lord Henry has announced this morning 'there will be no Slane this year, but 2013 will be busy'".

==== 2013 ====
===== First Concert =====
15 June 2013

- Ham Sandwich
- Bressie
- The Coronas
- Bon Jovi - Because We Can - The Tour (headliner)

===== Second concert =====
17 August 2013

A capacity crowd of 80,000 watched Eminem.

- Chance The Rapper
- Slaughterhouse
- Yelawolf
- EarlWolf
- Plan B
- Eminem (Headliner)

==== 2014 ====
On 13 February 2014, Lord Henry Mountcharles announced that there would be no concert in 2014 as he could not find a good enough act.

Lord Henry stated the reason for the break in 2014 was that "there really wasn't an act that grabbed my imagination for this year." He went on to say that Slane would be back in 2015.

==== 2015 ====
On 26 November 2014, it was announced that Foo Fighters, along with Kaiser Chiefs, Hozier and two other unannounced bands would play Slane on 30 May 2015.

- The Strypes
- Ash
- Hozier
- Kaiser Chiefs
- Foo Fighters (Headliner)

==== 2016 ====
There was no concert at Slane in 2016. There were persistent rumours in 2015 and early 2016 of either AC/DC, Coldplay or the then newly reunited classic line up of Guns N' Roses featuring original members Axl Rose, guitarist Slash and bassist Duff McKagan playing a concert at Slane during Summer 2016.

However, on 15 February 2016, it was announced that no concert would take place at Slane Castle in 2016 due to difficulties in staging the concert as construction work on the Slane Castle Distillery was taking place at the castle.

It was announced that a concert would take place in Summer 2017 once construction work on the Distillery is complete.

==== 2017 ====
In early December 2016, promotional posters for the rock band Guns N' Roses appeared in Dublin City. This fueled speculation of a forthcoming announcement that the band were going to play at Slane in Summer 2017.

On 5 December 2016, after many months of rumours and speculation, it was officially announced that Guns N' Roses would headline Slane 2017. The announcement was made by Lord Henry Mountcharles's son Alex and daughter Tamara during a press conference at Bruxelles pub in Dublin City Centre. It was the second time that Guns N' Roses played at Slane, having first played there 25 years previously, in 1992.

On 4 April 2017 the full lineup for the 2017 concert was announced, it featured:

- Otherkin
- Mark Lanegan
- Royal Blood
- Guns N' Roses (Headliner)

Guns N' Roses played the Soundgarden song 'Black Hole Sun' as a tribute to Soundgarden's singer Chris Cornell, who died on 18 May.

The Irish Independent positively reviewed the concert and commented that "Twenty-five years after they first played Ireland's biggest gig, Guns N' Roses came, saw and conquered Slane Castle all over again."

==== 2019 ====
The 8 June 2019 lineup was:

- Metallica (Headliner)
- Ghost
- Stiff Little Fingers
- Bokassa
- Fangclub

==== 2023 ====
The Slane Festival returned on 10 June 2023 after a four-year hiatus with a sell-out 80,000 fans in attendance. Harry Styles was announced as the headliner on 26 August 2022.

- Harry Styles (Headliner)
- Inhaler
- Wet Leg
- Annie Mac
- Mitch Rowland

==== 2026 ====
In October 2025, it was confirmed that Luke Combs would headline Slane on the 18 and 19 July 2026, with support acts The Script, Ty Myers, The Castellows, and Jamie McIntyre.

==== 2027 ====
On 31 August 2026, it was announced that Fontaines D.C would headline Slane alongside Hayley Williams, Madra Salach and Damien Dempsey on 26 and 27 June 2027.

On 15th September 2026, Oasis announced that they would perform at Slane on 4th and 5th September 2027.

== Future ==
Red Hot Chili Peppers member Chad Smith has stated that he "wouldn't mind doing Slane again" saying the band "had an awesome time last time".

Green Day's Billie Joe Armstrong has spoken to Hot Press magazine of his admiration for U2's shows at Slane and, in relation to his band performing there in 2010, commented: "It's something that's being looked at". However, the rumour, a recurring one in recent years, was dismissed for 2010 when the band opted to play a show in Marlay Park instead. Green Day played at the lower capacity Royal Hospital Kilmainham venue in Dublin on their Revolution Radio Tour in 2017. It is becoming increasingly unlikely that the band will ever play at Slane.

Lord Conyngham has stated on radio that he will secure AC/DC to perform at the venue in the future in response to repeated calls by fans.

== Controversies ==
The Marquess Conyngham insists that the venue be played by rock bands and will not allow so-called 'manufactured bands' such as Westlife, Take That or Boyzone to play at his castle grounds. Westlife and Boyzone manager Louis Walsh maintains that Westlife have no interest in playing at Slane, saying a Croke Park concert would be a "dream come true" for his band and that it would be "a far better venue than a field in Meath".

The 2004 concert attracted protests from the people of Slane, as it was to be held on a Sunday. The inhabitants were afraid of repeats of the civil unrest that had occurred the last time a concert was held on a Sunday, in 1984. This was due to concert-goers arriving the day before, Saturday, and consuming large amounts of alcohol before the Sunday concert. The matter was resolved by postponing the start of the concert and having a notably smaller lineup than other years.

In 2009, Dublin Bus did not provide enough transport for those who purchased a return ticket, and there were no Garda Síochána near the buses. The concert ended between 22.30 and 23:00, yet thousands did not get a bus seat until 03:00.

After the 2013 Eminem concert, photographs were circulated widely on social media websites under the hashtag "#slanegirl," showing a teenage girl publicly performing oral sex acts on two different men at the venue. The incident received international publicity, sparking debate about issues such as teenage sexual behaviour, double standards, cyberbullying, and slut-shaming. The girl became so distraught over the publicity that she was hospitalized and sedated.

== DVD and video ==
- Bob Dylan: 1984, 45 minute audience video
- Bryan Adams: Live at Slane Castle, Ireland (DVD)
- Foo Fighters: Everywhere but Home (UMD, partial concert)
- Guns N' Roses: 1 hour 51 minute audience video
- Madonna: I'm Going to Tell You a Secret
- Neil Young: 1993, 81 minute audience video
- Queen: 1986, 63 minute audience video
- Red Hot Chili Peppers: Live at Slane Castle (DVD)
- Robbie Williams: Live at Slane (DVD)
- The Rolling Stones: 2007, 1 hour audience video
- U2: U2 Go Home: Live from Slane Castle (DVD)
- U2: 25 August 2001, first night 1 hour audience video
- Kings of Leon 2011, 34 minute video
- Metallica: Metallica Mondays: Live at Slane Castle, 2 hours 28 minutes (Live Stream)
