= Otherside =

1999 single by Red Hot Chili Peppers

Single by Red Hot Chili Peppers

from the album Californication
- B-side: "How Strong"
- Released: December 1999
- Genre: Alternative rock
- Length: 4:15
- Label: Warner Bros.
- Songwriters: Flea; John Frusciante; Anthony Kiedis; Chad Smith
- Producer: Rick Rubin

Red Hot Chili Peppers singles chronology
"Around the World" (1999)	"Otherside" (1999)	"Californication" (2000)

Music video
- "Otherside" on YouTube

"Otherside" is a song by American rock band Red Hot Chili Peppers. It was released as the third single from their seventh studio album, Californication (1999), and confronts the battles addicts have with their prior addictions. Lead vocalist Anthony Kiedis wrote the song about former band member Hillel Slovak, who died of a heroin overdose in 1988.

"Otherside" was released in Australia, New Zealand, and Japan in 1999 and was given a US and UK release in January 2000. The song peaked at number 14 on the US Billboard Hot 100 and number one on the Billboard Modern Rock Tracks chart, giving the band their fifth number one on this chart. It remained at number one for 13 consecutive weeks, one of the longest runs at the top of that chart. In Iceland, it became the second single from the album to reach number one, while in New Zealand, it charted at number five.

== Music video ==
The video was directed by Jonathan Dayton and Valerie Faris in a black-and-white/monochrome Gothic style similar to Robert Wiene's The Cabinet of Dr. Caligari, all influenced by German Expressionist art. Elements of Cubism and work by the graphic artist M. C. Escher are also seen in the video.

A cartoonish story line is juxtaposed upon the song; that of a young man's dream sequence. The band members appear dressed in black in unusual locations, with props intended to appear as surreal instruments. Throughout the video Anthony Kiedis with short, platinum hair is seen in a castle tower. His stage persona is different and quite dark when compared to his more energetic performances in other videos. John Frusciante plays a rope down a long corridor as if a guitar. Flea is hanging on high voltage wires and playing them as if they were a bass guitar, and Chad Smith is up on a tower with a rotating medieval clock that serves as his drum kit.

Jonathan Dayton: "We did look at Caligari, and we looked at a lot of German Expressionist film. But it was also very important to avoid 'Caligari.' It was both inspiration and something to work around, because it has such a strong, specific style, and there have been other videos that have completely ripped it off."

Valerie Faris: "We didn't look at 'Calagari' all that much, really. We did, but then we just left it. We did look at a lot of the works of the futurist artists from the '30s, and the illustrations of the surrealists and from cubism. We were inspired more by paintings than by films…"

== Reception ==
"Otherside" is widely considered to be one of the band's best songs. In 2021, Kerrang ranked the song number five on their list of the 20 greatest Red Hot Chili Peppers songs, and in 2022, Rolling Stone ranked the song number six on their list of the 40 greatest Red Hot Chili Peppers songs.

== Live performances ==
"Otherside" has remained a constant staple on the band's tours since 1999, making it one of their top ten most performed songs.

== Remixes ==
In 2009, Seattle producer Ryan Lewis sampled the song as a backdrop for his song of the same name with the rapper Macklemore. The song depicted Macklemore's own personal struggles as well as the wider problems that the hip hop community has with drug abuse.

In 2010, house duo Third Party made an unofficial remix of the song. The remix garnered considerable attention, but was never released. It was made official and released by Warner Records in 2013.

In 2015 British DJ Paul Oakenfold released a Future House remix released also by Warner Records, another version was released by Italian DJ Benny Benassi alongside Oakenfold.

== Track listings ==
CD single (2000)

1. "Otherside" (album) – 4:16
2. "How Strong" (previously unreleased)– 4:43

CD version 2 (2000)

1. "Otherside" (album) – 4:16
2. "My Lovely Man" (live) – 5:18
3. "Around the World" (music video)

CD version 3 [Australian release] (2000)

1. "Otherside" (album) – 4:16
2. "How Strong" (previously unreleased) – 4:46
3. "My Lovely Man" (live) – 5:18
4. "Road Trippin'" (without strings) – 3:25
5. "Scar Tissue" (music video)
6. "Around the World" (music video)

CD version 4 (2000)

1. "Otherside" (album) – 4:16
2. "How Strong" (previously unreleased) – 4:43
3. "My Lovely Man" (live) – 5:18
4. "Road Trippin'" (without strings) – 3:25

CD version 5 (2000)

1. "Otherside" (album) – 4:16
2. "How Strong" (previously unreleased) – 4:43
3. "Road Trippin'" (without strings) – 3:25
4. "Otherside" (music video)

Cassette version [US] (1999)

1. "Otherside" (album) - 4:16
2. "How Strong" (previously unreleased) – 4:43

== Personnel ==
Red Hot Chili Peppers

- Anthony Kiedis – lead vocals
- John Frusciante – guitar, backing vocals
- Flea – bass
- Chad Smith – drums, shaker, cowbell

== Charts ==
=== Weekly charts ===
2000 weekly chart performance for "Otherside"
Chart (2000)	Peak position
Australia (ARIA)	31
Canada Top Singles (RPM)	32
Canada Rock/Alternative (RPM)	1
Europe (Eurochart Hot 100)	74
Germany (GfK)	44
Greece (IFPI)	10
Iceland (Íslenski Listinn Topp 40)	1
Ireland (IRMA)	41
Italy (FIMI)	17
Netherlands (Dutch Top 40)	14
Netherlands (Single Top 100)	24
New Zealand (Recorded Music NZ)	5
Poland Airplay (Music & Media)	11
Scottish Singles Sales (Official Charts)	31
Sweden (Sverigetopplistan)	19
Switzerland (Schweizer Hitparade)	65
UK Singles (Official Charts)	33
US Billboard Hot 100	14
US Adult Alternative Airplay (Billboard)	12
US Adult Pop Airplay (Billboard)	11
US Alternative Airplay (Billboard)	1
US Mainstream Rock Airplay (Billboard)	2
US Pop Airplay (Billboard)	26

2019 weekly chart performance for "Otherside"
Chart (2019)	Peak position
Poland Airplay (ZPAV)	73

2026 weekly chart performance for "Otherside"
Chart (2026)	Peak position
Portugal (AFP)	186

=== Year-end charts ===
Year-end chart performance for "Otherside"
Chart (2000)	Position
Iceland (Íslenski Listinn Topp 40)	2
Netherlands (Dutch Top 40)	57
New Zealand (RIANZ)	10
US Billboard Hot 100	59
US Adult Top 40 (Billboard)	26
US Mainstream Rock Tracks (Billboard)	6
US Mainstream Top 40 (Billboard)	90
US Modern Rock Tracks (Billboard)	4
US Triple-A (Billboard)	29

== Certifications ==
Certifications and sales for "Otherside"
Region	Certification	Certified units/sales
Canada (Music Canada)	5× Platinum	400,000^{‡}
Denmark (IFPI Danmark)	Gold	45,000^{‡}
Italy (FIMI) sales since 2009	2× Platinum	200,000^{‡}
New Zealand (RMNZ)	5× Platinum	150,000^{‡}
Portugal (AFP)	3× Platinum	30,000^{‡}
Spain (Promusicae)	Platinum	60,000^{‡}
United Kingdom (BPI)	2× Platinum	1,200,000^{‡}
United States (RIAA)	5× Platinum	5,000,000^{‡}
^{‡} Sales+streaming figures based on certification alone.

== Release history ==
Release dates and formats for "Otherside"
Region	Date	Format(s)	Label(s)	Ref.
Australia	December 1999	CD	Warner Bros.	
New Zealand	December 13, 1999	CD	Warner Bros.	
Japan	December 22, 1999	CD	Warner Bros.	
United States	January 11, 2000	Alternative radio	Warner Bros.	
United Kingdom	January 31, 2000	CD	Warner Bros.	
United States	February 21, 2000	Hot adult contemporary; modern adult contemporary radio	Warner Bros.	
United States	February 22, 2000	Contemporary hit radio	Warner Bros.	

== See also ==
- List of Billboard Alternative Songs number ones of the 2000s
- List of RPM number-one alternative rock singles
