= Around the World (Red Hot Chili Peppers song) =

1999 single by Red Hot Chili Peppers

Single by Red Hot Chili Peppers

from the album Californication
- B-side: "Teatro Jam"
- Released: August 23, 1999
- Length: 3:58
- Label: Warner Bros.
- Songwriters: Flea; John Frusciante; Anthony Kiedis; Chad Smith
- Producer: Rick Rubin

Red Hot Chili Peppers singles chronology
"Scar Tissue" (1999)	"Around the World" (1999)	"Otherside" (1999)

Music video
- "Around The World" on YouTube

"Around the World" is a song by American rock band Red Hot Chili Peppers, appearing as the opening track on their seventh studio album Californication (1999). The song was released as the album's second single on August 23, 1999. The single peaked at number seven on the Billboard Modern Rock Tracks chart and number 16 on the Mainstream Rock Tracks chart.

In 2007, the song was heavily edited and used as a new soundtrack for the Rockin' California Screamin' ride at Disney California Adventure, as part of their "Rockin' Both Parks" campaign. The song was also used as the opening theme for the 2010 live-action film adaptation of Beck. In 2011, a live version was one of the thirty songs by thirty different artists featured on the Songs for Japan charity album.

== Meaning ==
Anthony Kiedis has stated that in the lyrics for the verses he is telling about his journeys and his experiences on them, about being a member of the Red Hot Chili Peppers and living an extreme life. He also noted that Roberto Benigni's film Life Is Beautiful was a lyrical inspiration.

John Frusciante came up with the music for the song while playing at his house and told the other band members they would have to hear it but he had to play it with somebody because of its deceptive downbeat. Chad Smith kept time on the hi-hat while Frusciante played. Band members liked the outcome and Flea came up with his bass part.

The different final chorus originates from a request from Flea's daughter. While writing the album in Flea's garage his daughter would listen to their songs. At the time of writing, Kiedis was struggling to come up with lyrics for the songs, so just filled in with scat. When a final draft of the album was made and Flea's daughter listened to the final version, she was disappointed that the scat had been removed. So, on the final version of the song in the last chorus, the original scatting vocal was used instead.

When recording the song John Frusciante played a '66 Fender Jaguar which he had borrowed from their engineer Jim Scott. He played it through two Marshalls: a JTM 45 and a 100-watt SuperBass. Frusciante told that he liked Jaguars because of their "real cool cheap sound".

Flea played on a Modulus Flea Bass (Silver Flake) on the song. He also uses the Modulus in the music video.

== Music video ==
A music video was made for the song and was released on September 14, 1999. The video was directed by Stéphane Sednaoui, who had previously made videos for other Chili Peppers songs such as "Breaking the Girl", "Scar Tissue" and "Give It Away". The latter in particular, with its unique, chaotic visual style, is similar to "Around the World"; Sednaoui used similar visual techniques in the video for R.E.M.'s song "Lotus". The video was featured on an episode of MTV's Making the Video.

== Live performances ==
"Around the World" has remained a constant staple on the band's tours since 1999, making it one of their top ten most performed songs.

The band Mr. Bungle performed a mock version of the song in 1999, as part of a halloween concert parodying Red Hot Chili Peppers.

== Track listings ==
CD 1

1. "Around the World" – 3:58
2. "Parallel Universe" (demo) – 5:33
3. "Teatro Jam" – 3:06

CD 2

1. "Around the World" – 3:59
2. "Me and My Friends" (live) – 3:08
3. "Yertle Trilogy" (live) – 7:10

Maxi-single

1. "Around the World" – 3:58
2. "Parallel Universe" (demo) – 5:33
3. "Teatro Jam" – 3:06
4. "Me and My Friends" (live) – 3:08
- All live tracks were recorded in Södra Teatern, Stockholm (1999)

== Personnel ==
Red Hot Chili Peppers

- Anthony Kiedis – lead vocals
- John Frusciante – guitar, backing vocals
- Flea – bass
- Chad Smith – drums, shaker, wood block

Additional personnel

- Greg Kurstin – keyboard

== Charts ==
=== Weekly charts ===
Weekly chart performance for "Around the World"
Chart (1999)	Peak position
Australia (ARIA)	49
Canada Rock/Alternative (RPM)	18
Iceland (Íslenski Listinn Topp 40)	2
Netherlands (Single Top 100)	69
New Zealand (Recorded Music NZ)	35
Scottish Singles Sales (Official Charts)	30
UK Singles (Official Charts)	35
US Bubbling Under Hot 100 (Billboard)	8
US Alternative Airplay (Billboard)	7
US Mainstream Rock (Billboard)	16

=== Year-end charts ===
1999 year-end chart performance for "Around the World"
Chart (1999)	Position
US Modern Rock Tracks (Billboard)	71

2000 year-end chart performance for "Around the World"
Chart (2000)	Position
US Mainstream Rock Tracks (Billboard)	99
US Modern Rock Tracks (Billboard)	56

== Certifications ==
Certifications for "Around the World"
Region	Certification	Certified units/sales
United Kingdom (BPI)	Silver	200,000^{‡}
United States (RIAA)	Gold	500,000^{‡}
^{‡} Sales+streaming figures based on certification alone.

== Release history ==
Release history and formats for "Around the World"
Region	Date	Format(s)	Label(s)	Ref.
United Kingdom	August 23, 1999	CD; cassette	Warner Bros.	
Japan	September 8, 1999	CD	Warner Bros.	
United States	September 28, 1999	Mainstream rock; active rock radio	Warner Bros.	
