= Road Trippin' =

2000 single by Red Hot Chili Peppers

Single by Red Hot Chili Peppers

from the album Californication
- Released: December 11, 2000
- Genre: Folk
- Length: 3:25
- Label: Warner Bros.
- Songwriters: John Frusciante; Flea; Anthony Kiedis; Chad Smith
- Producer: Rick Rubin

Red Hot Chili Peppers singles chronology
"Californication" (2000)	"Road Trippin'" (2000)	"Parallel Universe" (2001)

Music video
- "Road Trippin'" on YouTube

"Road Trippin'" is a song by American rock band Red Hot Chili Peppers from their seventh studio album, Californication (1999). It was released as the album's fifth single in December 2000.

== Background ==
The single was released only in Australia and Europe; in the former region, it was released on December 11, 2000, while in the United Kingdom, it was issued on January 1, 2001. A music video was also made but not released in the United States until the band released their Greatest Hits album in 2003. Two versions of the single were released in the UK, but only the first was available elsewhere. A third, compilation version was released in Australia. With the song being only released in Europe it is amongst the least-known singles the band has released. As a result, it did not garner much recognition or airplay outside the band's fanbase.

The song tells of a road trip along the Pacific Coast Highway in which lead singer Anthony Kiedis, guitarist John Frusciante and bassist Flea surfed at Big Sur following Frusciante's return to the band. Drummer Chad Smith did not take the trip with his bandmates due to other commitments and also because he was not into surfing. The song is entirely acoustic, and is one of few Peppers album tracks (along with "Lovin and Touchin", "Thirty Dirty Birds", "Pea", "If" and "Tangelo") not to feature drums. As such, Smith only appears briefly halfway through the video, arriving in a boat.

== Live performances ==
"Road Trippin'" has only ever been performed live four times and not since 2004, although previous guitarist Josh Klinghoffer did a tease of the song during the I'm with You tour in 2012.

== Track listings ==
Single CD1

1. "Road Trippin'" (album version) – 3:26
2. "Californication" (live) – 6:03
3. "Blood Sugar Sex Magik" (live) – 4:21
4. "Road Trippin'" (enhanced video)

Single CD2

1. "Road Trippin'" (album version) – 3:26
2. "Under the Bridge" (live) – 4:28
3. "If You Have to Ask" (live) – 5:21

Single CD3

1. "Road Trippin'" (album version)
2. "Californication" (live) – 6:03
3. "Blood Sugar Sex Magik" (live) – 4:21
4. "Under the Bridge" (live) – 4:28

Australian single

1. "Road Trippin'" (album version) – 3:26
2. "Californication" (live) – 6:03
3. "Blood Sugar Sex Magik" (live) – 4:21
4. "Under the Bridge" (live) – 4:27
5. "If You Have to Ask" (live) – 5:20

== Personnel ==
Red Hot Chili Peppers

- Anthony Kiedis – lead vocals
- John Frusciante – acoustic guitar, backing vocals
- Flea – acoustic bass guitar

Additional personnel

- Patrick Warren – Chamberlin organ

== Charts ==
Weekly chart performance for "Road Trippin'"
Chart (2000–2001)	Peak position
Australia (ARIA)	56
Europe (Eurochart Hot 100)	82
Germany (GfK)	89
Italy (FIMI)	21
Netherlands (Single Top 100)	80
New Zealand (Recorded Music NZ)	44
Poland (PiF PaF)	30
Scottish Singles Sales (Official Charts)	29
Switzerland (Schweizer Hitparade)	91
UK Singles (Official Charts)	30

== Certifications ==
Certifications for "Road Trippin'"
Region	Certification	Certified units/sales
United States (RIAA)	Gold	500,000^{‡}
^{‡} Sales+streaming figures based on certification alone.

== Release history ==
Release history and formats for "Road Trippin'"
Region	Date	Format(s)	Label(s)	Ref.
Australia	December 11, 2000	CD	Warner Bros.	
Japan	December 20, 2000	CD	Warner Bros.	
United Kingdom	January 1, 2001	CD; cassette	Warner Bros.	
