= Californication (album) =

1999 studio album by Red Hot Chili Peppers

Studio album by Red Hot Chili Peppers
- Released: June 8, 1999
- Recorded: December 1998 – March 1999
- Studios: Cello (Los Angeles, California)
- Genres: Alternative rock; funk rock
- Length: 56:24
- Label: Warner Bros.
- Producer: Rick Rubin

Red Hot Chili Peppers chronology
Under the Covers: Essential Red Hot Chili Peppers (1998)	Californication (1999)	By the Way (2002)

Singles from Californication
- 1. "Scar Tissue" Released: May 1999; 2. "Around the World" Released: August 1999; 3. "Otherside" Released: December 1999; 4. "Californication" Released: June 2000; 5. "Road Trippin'" Released: December 2000

Californication is the seventh studio album by the American rock band Red Hot Chili Peppers, released on June 8, 1999, on Warner Bros. Records. It was produced by Rick Rubin. Along with Blood Sugar Sex Magik, Californication is one of the band's best-selling albums.

Californication marked the return of guitarist John Frusciante, who'd previously appeared on Mother's Milk and Blood Sugar Sex Magik, and shifted the band's style. The lyrics incorporated the sexual innuendos already associated with the band, but added themes including death, California, suicide, drugs, globalization and travel.

Californication is the Chili Peppers' most commercially successful studio release to date, with more than 17 million copies sold worldwide, and more than eight million in the United States alone. As of 2002, the album had sold more than four million copies in Europe. The record yielded several hits for the band, including "Otherside," the title track and the Grammy Award-winning "Scar Tissue." Californication peaked at number three on the U.S. Billboard 200.

The record marked a significant change in style for the band: Rolling Stone's Greg Tate noted that "while all previous Chili Peppers projects have been highly spirited, Californication dares to be spiritual and epiphanic". Another critic, Billboard's Paul Verna, mentioned that the album brought out "the group's softer, melodic side", as opposed to their previous six albums.

== Background ==
In 1991, the Red Hot Chili Peppers released their breakthrough album Blood Sugar Sex Magik on Warner Bros. Records. The album sold seven million copies in the United States, and became a seminal component of the alternative rock explosion in the early 1990s. After the release of Blood Sugar Sex Magik, guitarist John Frusciante left the Red Hot Chili Peppers, as he became overwhelmed by the band's newfound popularity. Dave Navarro was hired as his replacement, and incorporated elements of heavy metal and psychedelic rock on the band's 1995 album One Hot Minute. The album failed to match the critical and commercial success of its predecessor, and Navarro left in early 1998.

In the years following his departure, Frusciante became addicted to heroin and cocaine, leaving him in poverty and near death. Friends convinced Frusciante to enter drug rehabilitation, and in 1998, he rejoined the Red Hot Chili Peppers at the insistence of bassist Flea. While in rehab, Frusciante came to terms with rock stardom; in a Rolling Stone interview, he said: "It got into my head that stardom was something evil. If you were a rock star, you were trying to put people on. I don't see it that way anymore." With Frusciante, the Red Hot Chili Peppers began brainstorming ideas for a new album. Flea suggested the group record an album with electronic influences, akin to Zooropa by U2. When the band was turned down by multiple electronic music producers (including David Bowie), they decided to instead pursue an alternative rock direction with throwbacks to their roots.

== Writing and recording ==
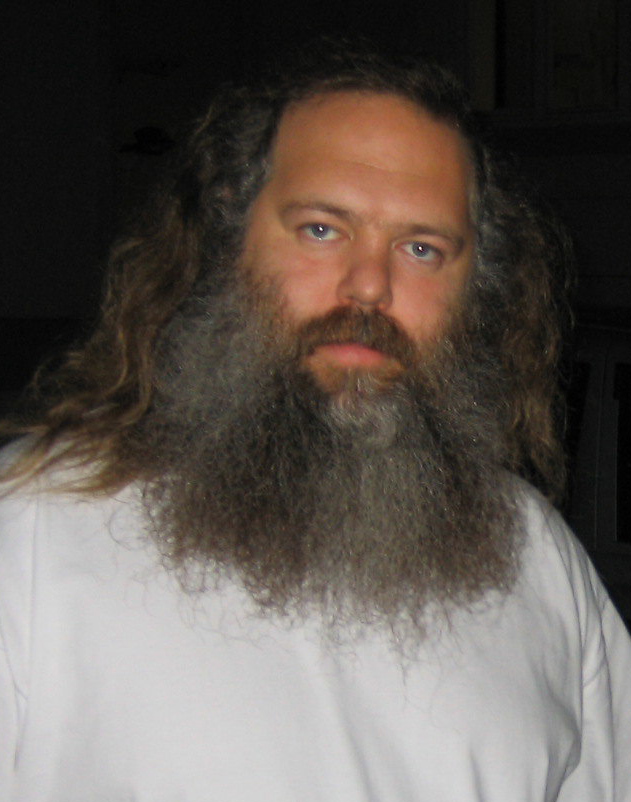
After producing the band's two previous albums, Rick Rubin (pictured in 2006) returned to produce Californication.

The majority of the music for Californication was written at Flea's makeshift garage studio in the summer of 1998. It took Frusciante several weeks to readjust to playing with bandmates, especially while recovering from drug addiction. Singer Anthony Kiedis noted that as a result of this readjustment period, Frusciante adopted a minimalist approach to guitar playing. According to biographer Jeff Apter, the Red Hot Chili Peppers wrote between 30 and 40 songs for the album, which would eventually get distilled to 15 for the release. The band members took on a laid-back approach to writing music. As Kiedis said: "Everyone was having fun. It was as if we had nothing to lose, nothing to gain. We didn't care; we were making music for the sake of making music."

Californication was recorded at Cello Studios in Los Angeles, and took a little over three weeks to complete. The band chose Rick Rubin to produce the album. Rubin had worked with the Red Hot Chili Peppers on their two previous albums, and Kiedis noted that there was some hesitation to reenlist him. "We thought that maybe it was time to get a new producer. Every time you make a record, it doesn't matter how good it was working with a producer, and even if you know you're going to end up making a record with that same person again, there's always a day when someone says, 'Do we want to get a new producer?'" About a week into the recording sessions, Jim Scott was brought in as a replacement audio engineer, as the band was not happy with the original production. The band was timely and professional, in comparison to what Rubin described as the "day-long pot sessions or sexual indulgences" that had plagued the recording sessions for previous albums.

Recording the songs took five days. All four band members recorded their instruments at the same time within the same room. Rubin and Scott wanted the audio to be "dry and punchy", and thus placed numerous microphones directly next to the instruments. Among the microphones used were Shure SM57s, Neumann U47s, and Sennheiser MD 421s. Californication was recorded using Neve 8038 desk on two Ampex 124 24-track tape recorders. Scott induced significant equalization using Neve 1073 EQs. There was minimal overdubbing. Once the songs were recorded, the tracks from the second 24-track machine containing vocals were transferred over to Pro Tools to allow easy experimentation to establish a "map" of how various portions of the vocals would fit together prior to analog assembly of these portions. Continuing on the theme of making the album sound "dry and punchy", most of Californication was mixed using monaural sound. Scott felt the initial recordings were already good, and thus very little was altered during the mixing sessions. The album was mixed separately on various digital formats (including Digital Audio Tape and DA-88) to compare the sound, and Scott eventually used an analog 2‑track at 30 inches per second.

=== Additional material ===
Many songs recorded during the Californication sessions were not commercially available until later releases:

Californication outtakes
Title	Source
"Gong Li"	"Scar Tissue"
"Instrumental #1"	"Scar Tissue"
"Teatro Jam"	"Around the World"
"How Strong"	"Otherside"
"Slowly Deeply"	"Universally Speaking"
"Fat Dance"	iTunes bonus tracks
"Over Funk"	iTunes bonus tracks
"Quixoticelixer"	iTunes bonus tracks
"Instrumental #2"	Californication bonus disc (AUS & JP)
"Bunker Hill"	"Fortune Faded"

=== Teatro sessions ===
In September 1998 the band went into Daniel Lanois' El Teatro studio in Oxnard, California to begin their rehearsal and record demos for the album that would eventually become Californication. The sessions, which were dubbed the Teatro Sessions, remained unreleased until 2014 when they leaked to the internet. The sessions featured early versions of songs that would eventually appear on the album however some were much different than the final versions that appeared on the album. Songs such as "Californication" and "Purple Stain" contain vastly different instrumentation and are essentially different songs. "I Like Dirt" and "Bunker Hill" have different bridges. Many songs also feature unfinished or different lyrics from their final studio versions. The sessions also featured seven songs that never made it past the demo stage and went unreleased and unheard until the leak. These songs included "Tellin' a Lie", "Mommasan", "Andaman & Nicobar", "Sugar Sugar", "Trouble in the Pub", "Boatman", "Plate of Brown" and also various instrumental jams. Of the songs recorded during these sessions, the instrumental "Teatro Jam" and the demo for "Parallel Universe" were officially released on the "Around the World" single.

== Composition ==
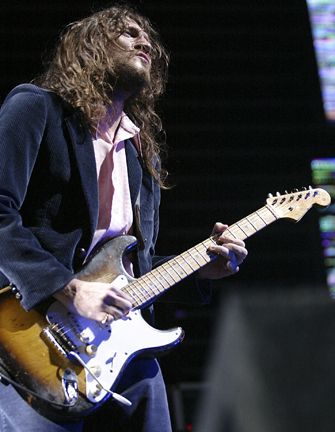
Californication marked the return of guitarist John Frusciante (pictured in 2006), who had left the band in 1992.

Most of the material and lyrics throughout the songs in the album came from the "personal and professional turmoil" that different members of the band went through or were currently going through at the time. This resulted in the "sensitive approach that one might not expect from a band whose followers are skate-punks and fraternity boys". Kiedis's main point behind this album was to "tell tales of wandering souls who've lost their way searching for the American dream in California".

Californication's lyrics were derived from Kiedis' ideas, outlooks, and perceptions of life and its meaning. "Porcelain" resulted from Kiedis' meeting with a young single mother at the YMCA, who was attempting to battle her heroin addiction while living with her infant daughter in Los Angeles during the summer of 1998. Regarding the meeting that inspired the song, Kiedis said in 1999, "[the] Mum's in a haze, strung out on heroin, but the little girl's this beaming-wide sunball of an angel. The woman loves her daughter, but the juxtaposition of their energies is profound." Kiedis also had a love interest in Yohanna Logan, a fashion designer whom Kiedis met while she was working in New York City. Kiedis' involvement with Logan influenced his examination of love throughout Californication, in songs such as "This Velvet Glove". Sarcasm was a concept that Kiedis had dealt with in the past, and he ultimately crafted a song around it. He was inspired by Navarro, whom he considered to be the "King of Sarcasm". Frusciante approached the guitar line present in "Scar Tissue" as an attempt to use two notes that are played far apart, but produce a "cool rhythm". He had explored this technique on his first solo album, 1994's Niandra LaDes and Usually Just a T-Shirt. Frusciante considers "Scar Tissue" to be a "very simple example of the technique, but I think it's a style that sounds like me". The guitarist made use of slide guitar-playing for the solos in the song. "Emit Remmus" was inspired by Kiedis' brief relationship with Melanie C of the Spice Girls.

"Get on Top", a song which contains significant use of a wah pedal, was formed after a jam session conducted shortly after Frusciante had listened to Public Enemy: "I came up with [the rhythm to the song] on the way to rehearsal—just tapping it out with my foot." The understated guitar solo played in the middle of the song was originally intended to be more noticeable, according to Frusciante, who was playing screaming guitar solos. He changed his thought process after listening to Steve Howe's guitar solo on Yes' "Siberian Khatru": "the band sounded really big—and they're playing really fast—and then this clean guitar solo comes out over on top. It's really beautiful, like it's on its own sort of shelf. For 'Get On Top' I wanted to play something that contrasted between the solo and the background." "Savior", a song found towards the end of the album, features heavy effects, most notably an Electro-Harmonix Micro Synth with 16-second delay. Frusciante notes that the sound is "directly inspired by Eric Clapton's playing in Cream. If you listen to the actual notes, they're like a Clapton solo—they just don't sound like it because of the effects."

The hit "Around the World", which harkens back to the Chili Peppers' funk-influenced sound, was constructed by Frusciante at his home. The rhythm and beat, however, are intricate; this required him to play the song with the rest of the band rather than alone for them to understand it. The bass lick was composed in "maybe 15 minutes," according to Frusciante: "Flea is the best bass player in the world. His sense of timing and the way he thinks is so crazy." The title track of the album was among the most difficult for the band to complete. Frusciante felt compelled to write an appropriate guitar ensemble that would appropriately complement the poignant lyrical content, but encountered difficulty. The song was barely making progress, and would have been scrapped had it not been for Kiedis' urging to include it on the album. Frusciante completed the final riff two days before recording, after drawing inspiration from the Cure's soundtrack song to "Carnage Visors". The title track was intended to represent Californian lifestyles and, more specifically, the "fake" nature which is associated with much of Hollywood. It references Kurt Cobain of Nirvana and uses considerable imagery to capture the evocative nature of California.

The record was a change of style for the Chili Peppers, especially compared to One Hot Minute. Although Californication still contains some funk rock songs (such as "Around the World", "Get on Top", "I Like Dirt", "Purple Stain" and "Right on Time"), it leaned towards more melodic riffs (for example, "Scar Tissue" and "Otherside") and focused on songs with implemented structure rather than jams.

== Promotion and release ==
To promote Californication, the Red Hot Chili Peppers developed what biographer Jeff Apter called an "Internet presence opening themselves up to a whole new type of listener – the cyber geek." From June 4 to June 8, three new Californication songs were streamed every day on the band's website. Flea engaged with fans online with a series of Internet posts called "Fleamail", in which he would discuss the recording process, upcoming tour dates, and occasionally stream of consciousness style thoughts about his life. The Red Hot Chili Peppers also performed at various high school proms across the United States shortly before the release of the album. The idea was to reintroduce the Red Hot Chili Peppers to a younger audience. The theme of these performances was "Stop The Hate", which was in response to the Columbine High School massacre. The price of admission was a written suggestion on how to prevent bullying and hatred among high school students.

Californication was released on June 8, 1999, by Warner Bros. Records. It debuted at number 3 on the Billboard 200 chart, and sold 189,000 copies by June 26, surpassing the initial sales of Blood Sugar Sex Magik and One Hot Minute. By July 3, Californication dropped to number 7, and stayed on the Billboard 200 chart for 101 weeks. It has since been certified 8× Platinum by the Recording Industry Association of America (RIAA), for selling over 8 million copies in the United States. Californication also saw significant commercial success outside of the United States. For example, in England, the album peaked at number 5 on the UK Albums Chart, and stayed on the chart for 169 weeks. It was eventually certified 5× Platinum by the British Phonographic Industry for selling 1.5 million copies in the United Kingdom. Other notable peaks include reaching number 1 on the Australian, Finnish, Italian, New Zealand, Norwegian, and Swedish charts. As of 2019, Californication is the best selling Red Hot Chili Peppers album, with sales of over 17 million copies worldwide.

A large part of Californication's commercial success can be attributed to the popularity of its singles. The three most popular singles were "Californication", "Otherside", and "Scar Tissue". William Goodman of Billboard wrote: "You couldn't exist in American pop culture without hearing its singles." "Scar Tissue" was the lead single, and in the accompanying music video, the four band members ride in a convertible through Joshua Tree National Park. "Scar Tissue" spent 16 weeks atop the Mainstream Rock chart in the United States, and peaked at number 9 on the Billboard Hot 100. In addition, the song was added to the rotation of all 91 modern rock radio stations in the United States, the first song to accomplish the feat since "Discothèque" by U2. "Californication" and "Otherside" also saw significant radio play, peaking at number 69 and 14 on the Billboard Hot 100 respectively.

=== Californication Tour ===
Immediately following the release of Californication, the band embarked on a world tour to support the record, beginning in the United States. To culminate the United States leg of their tour, the Red Hot Chili Peppers were asked to close Woodstock '99, which became infamous for the resulting violence. The band was informed minutes before arriving that the crowds and bonfires in the fields had gone out of control. When the Red Hot Chili Peppers performed a cover of "Fire" by the Jimi Hendrix Experience to finish their set, the disruption escalated into violence when several women, who had been crowd surfing and moshing, were raped and nearby property was looted and destroyed. The Washington Post reported that the decision to perform "Fire" was already scheduled prior to the festival, and was not in response to the ongoing fires. When asked about the event, Smith said: "[The fire] literally looked like a little hamburger stand had a grease fire or something ... It looked like nothing from where we were at."

To kick off the band's European tour, the band staged a free show in Moscow's Red Square, on August 14, 1999, to a crowd of over 200,000. Kiedis recalled the situation: "Red Square was so filled with wall-to-wall Russians that we needed a police escort to get near the stage." Following the European leg, the group did a show in New York City, at the Windows on the World, for KROQ radio contest-winners, and then at the Big Day Out festival in Australia following several Japanese tour dates. Flea, however, began to feel the repercussions of touring causing the band to set up concerts that were less strenuous, and consequently less financially rewarding, for them. These shows would finish the remainder of the Californication tour. As one of the last shows before the release of their next album By the Way, the Red Hot Chili Peppers played at Rock in Rio 3 in Rio de Janeiro.

== Critical reception ==
Professional ratings
Review scores
Source	Rating
AllMusic	4/5 stars
Entertainment Weekly	B+
The Guardian	4/5 stars
Los Angeles Times	2/4 stars
Mojo	4/5 stars
NME	6/10
Pitchfork	6.8/10
Q	4/5 stars
Rolling Stone	4/5 stars
Uncut	4/5 stars

Californication was very well-received by music critics in contrast to One Hot Minute and it was a greater success worldwide. Rolling Stone credited Kiedis for his drastically improved vocals: "[his] vocal cords have apparently been down to some crossroads and over the rehab, and returned with heretofore unheard-of range, body, pitch, soulfulness, and melodic sensibility." Songs such as "Otherside" and "Porcelain" were called "Pumpkins-esque", while the album as a whole was "epiphanal" and the "RHCP furthermuckers are now moving toward funk's real Holy Grail: that salty marriage of esoteric mythology and insatiable musicality that salvages souls, binds communities and heals the sick." Howard Cohen hailed Californication as a major improvement over its predecessor in the Miami Herald, finding it features the band's "most accomplished music" to date. The Edmonton Journal's Sandra Sperounes predicted that the "mighty dope" album would be a success, and "Scar Tissue" and "Otherside" would be chart toppers. She praised the renewed instrumentation and harmonies but took issue with the numerous references to California.

Other critics credited the album's success to the return of Frusciante. AllMusic's Greg Prato said that the "obvious reason for [the band's] rebirth is the reappearance of guitarist John Frusciante", considering him to be the "quintessential RHCP guitarist". The album as a whole was "a bona fide Chili Peppers classic". Entertainment Weekly also credits Frusciante with transforming the band's sound into a "more relaxed, less grating, and, in their own way, more introspective album than ever before". Mark Woodlief of Ray Gun commented that "'This Velvet Glove' strikes an intricate balance between a lush acoustic guitar foundation and anthemic rock," Woodlief continued "the disco intro to 'Parallel Universe' gives way to a scorching Western giddy-up motif in the chorus, and Frusciante's Hendrix-like excursions at the song's close."

While many critics found the band's new sound refreshing, NME criticized the Chili Peppers for rarely using their trademark funk sound, asking: "Can we have our brain-dead, half-dressed funk-hop rock animals back now, please? All this false empathy is starting to make my removed rib tingle." Pitchfork, while considering the album a triumph over One Hot Minute, felt Californication lacked the funk that was ever-present in Blood Sugar Sex Magik. It went on to scrutinize some lyrics for being overly sexual, but also considered Frusciante to be "the best big-time American rock guitarist going right now". Critic Robert Christgau gave the album a one-star honorable mention, describing the band as "New Age fuck fiends" and citing "Scar Tissue" and "Purple Stain" as highlights.

=== Retrospective commentary ===
Since its release, some journalists have credited Californication with revitalizing the Red Hot Chili Peppers' image and relevancy. During the eight-year period between the band's breakthrough album–Blood Sugar Sex Magik–and Californication, the Red Hot Chili Peppers' only release was One Hot Minute, which was seen by fans and critics as a failure. Additionally, the rise of the Internet and online music streaming platforms such as Napster gave consumers more options to listen to, which meant established bands like the Red Hot Chili Peppers no longer had built-in followings. Writing about this period of the band's career, Ryan Leas of Stereogum said: "RHCP had already been around since the early days of the '80s, but they were now approaching the other side of another decade, one that had granted them stardom ... they were positioned for, in need of, a comeback moment." Loudwire's Chad Childers offers similar commentary, and believes Californication helped solidify the band's status as eventual inductees in the Rock and Roll Hall of Fame.

When Californication was released, some listeners complained of excessive compression and distortion. This criticism persisted throughout the 2000s, and some journalists cited Californication as an example of an album affected by the loudness war, a trend in which audio levels are increased at the expense of audio fidelity. In his 2009 book Perfecting Sound Forever, Greg Milner notes that Californication became one of the most heavily derided albums within online audio mastering communities, and that there are multiple online petitions for Warner Bros. to remaster Red Hot Chili Peppers albums without the excessive compression and distortion.

In 2003, Rolling Stone released their list of the 500 Greatest Albums of All Time with Californication ranking at 399. It fell to 401 in the 2012 revised list, but moved up to 286 in both the 2020 and 2024 revised lists. In 2015, the staff of Ultimate Classic Rock named Californication one of the best rock albums of the 1990s. The album was also included in the 2018 edition of Robert Dimery's book 1001 Albums You Must Hear Before You Die. In 2024, Loudwire staff elected it as the best hard rock album of 1999.

== Track listing ==
All tracks are written by Red Hot Chili Peppers (Flea, John Frusciante, Anthony Kiedis, Chad Smith).

Californication track listing
No.	Title	Length
1.	"Around the World"	3:58
2.	"Parallel Universe"	4:30
3.	"Scar Tissue"	3:37
4.	"Otherside"	4:15
5.	"Get on Top"	3:18
6.	"Californication"	5:21
7.	"Easily"	3:51
8.	"Porcelain"	2:43
9.	"Emit Remmus"	4:00
10.	"I Like Dirt"	2:37
11.	"This Velvet Glove"	3:45
12.	"Savior"	4:52
13.	"Purple Stain"	4:13
14.	"Right on Time"	1:52
15.	"Road Trippin'"	3:25
Total length:		56:24

== Personnel ==
Credits per Californication liner notes, and Sound on Sound.

=== Red Hot Chili Peppers ===
- Anthony Kiedis – lead vocals, backing vocals
- John Frusciante – electric guitar, slide guitar, acoustic guitar on "This Velvet Glove" and "Road Trippin'", backing vocals
- Flea – bass guitar, acoustic bass guitar on "Road Trippin'", backing vocals
- Chad Smith – drums, percussion

=== Additional musicians ===
- Greg Kurstin – keyboards
- Patrick Warren – Chamberlin organ on "Road Trippin'"

=== Design ===
- Sonya Koskoff – photography
- Tony Wooliscroft – back cover photography
- Red Hot Chili Peppers – art direction
- Lawrence Azerrad – art direction

=== Production ===
- Rick Rubin – production
- Jim Scott – engineering, mixing
- John Sorenson – additional engineering, engineering assistance
- Greg Fidelman – additional engineering
- Greg Collins – additional engineering, engineering assistance
- David Schiffman – additional engineering
- Jennifer Hilliard – engineering assistance
- Ok Hee Kim – engineering assistance
- Vlado Meller – mastering

== Charts ==
=== Weekly charts ===
Weekly chart performance for Californication
Chart (1999)	Peak position
Australian Albums (ARIA)	1
Austrian Albums (Ö3 Austria)	2
Belgian Albums (Ultratop Flanders)	6
Belgian Albums (Ultratop Wallonia)	13
Canada Top Albums/CDs (RPM)	2
Canadian Albums (Billboard)	4
Danish Albums (Hitlisten)	8
Dutch Albums (Album Top 100)	2
European Albums (Billboard)	1
Finnish Albums (Suomen virallinen lista)	1
French Albums (SNEP)	2
German Albums (Offizielle Top 100)	2
Hungarian Albums (MAHASZ)	14
Irish Albums (IRMA)	4
Italian Albums (FIMI)	1
Japanese Albums (Oricon)	7
New Zealand Albums (RMNZ)	1
Norwegian Albums (VG-lista)	1
Portuguese Albums (AFP)	2
Scottish Albums (Official Charts)	12
Spanish Albums (AFYVE)	7
Swedish Albums (Sverigetopplistan)	1
Swiss Albums (Schweizer Hitparade)	2
UK Albums (OCC)	5
US Billboard 200	3

Chart (2002)	Peak position
US Top Catalog Albums (Billboard)	2

Chart (2011)	Peak position
Polish Albums (ZPAV)	22

Chart (2019)	Peak position
US Top Alternative Albums (Billboard)	17

Chart (2020)	Peak position
US Top Rock Albums (Billboard)	33

Chart (2024)	Peak position
Croatian International Albums (HDU)	3

Chart (2025–2026)	Peak position
German Rock & Metal Albums (Offizielle Top 100)	14
Norwegian Rock Albums (IFPI Norge)	7

=== Year-end charts ===
Year-end chart performance for Californication
Chart (1999)	Position
Australian Albums (ARIA)	9
Austrian Albums (Ö3 Austria)	13
Belgian Albums (Ultratop Flanders)	32
Belgian Albums (Ultratop Wallonia)	55
Canadian Albums (RPM)	8
Danish Albums (Hitlisten)	39
Dutch Albums (Album Top 100)	17
European Albums (Music & Media)	7
French Albums (SNEP)	47
German Albums (Offizielle Top 100)	18
Italian Albums (FIMI)	6
New Zealand Albums (RMNZ)	22
Spanish Albums (AFYPE)	36
Swedish Albums & Compilations (Sverigetopplistan)	12
Swiss Albums (Schweizer Hitparade)	20
UK Albums (OCC)	59
US Billboard 200	36

Chart (2000)	Position
Australian Albums (ARIA)	6
Austrian Albums (Ö3 Austria)	7
Belgian Albums (Ultratop Flanders)	20
Belgian Albums (Ultratop Wallonia)	38
Canadian Albums (Nielsen SoundScan)	14
Danish Albums (Hitlisten)	47
Dutch Albums (Album Top 100)	6
European Albums (Music & Media)	7
French Albums (SNEP)	55
German Albums (Offizielle Top 100)	6
Italian Albums (FIMI)	19
New Zealand Albums (RMNZ)	3
Swedish Albums & Compilations (Sverigetopplistan)	7
Swiss Albums (Schweizer Hitparade)	13
UK Albums (OCC)	40
US Billboard 200	24

Chart (2001)	Position
Australian Albums (ARIA)	84
Austrian Albums (Ö3 Austria)	72
Belgian Albums (Ultratop Flanders)	86
Belgian Albums (Ultratop Wallonia)	88
UK Albums (OCC)	113
US Billboard 200	180

Chart (2002)	Position
Canadian Alternative Albums (Nielsen SoundScan)	126
Canadian Metal Albums (Nielsen SoundScan)	62
UK Albums (OCC)	124

Chart (2003)	Position
UK Albums (OCC)	162

Chart (2018)	Position
Australian Vinyl Albums (ARIA)	88

Chart (2019)	Position
Australian Vinyl Albums (ARIA)	56
US Alternative Albums (Billboard)	47

Chart (2020)	Position
Belgian Albums (Ultratop Flanders)	174
US Alternative Albums (Billboard)	37
US Top Rock Albums (Billboard)	68

Chart (2021)	Position
Belgian Albums (Ultratop Flanders)	168

Chart (2022)	Position
Belgian Albums (Ultratop Flanders)	97
Belgian Albums (Ultratop Wallonia)	141

Chart (2023)	Position
Belgian Albums (Ultratop Flanders)	96
Belgian Albums (Ultratop Wallonia)	163
Dutch Albums (Album Top 100)	98
Hungarian Albums (MAHASZ)	76

Chart (2024)	Position
Belgian Albums (Ultratop Flanders)	102
Belgian Albums (Ultratop Wallonia)	157
Dutch Albums (Album Top 100)	94

Chart (2025)	Position
Belgian Albums (Ultratop Flanders)	72
Belgian Albums (Ultratop Wallonia)	135
Dutch Albums (Album Top 100)	72

=== Decade-end charts ===
Decade-end chart performance for Californication
Chart (2000–09)	Position
Australian Albums (ARIA)	83
US Billboard 200	138

Chart (2010–19)	Position
UK Vinyl Albums (OCC)	71

== Certifications and sales ==
Sales certifications for Californication
Region	Certification	Certified units/sales
Argentina (CAPIF)	3× Platinum	180,000^{^}
Australia (ARIA)	8× Platinum	560,000^{^}
Austria (IFPI Austria)	2× Platinum	100,000^{*}
Belgium (BRMA)	Platinum	50,000^{*}
Brazil (Pro-Música Brasil)	2× Platinum	500,000^{*}
Canada (Music Canada)	9× Platinum	900,000^{‡}
Chile	Platinum	25,000
Croatia (HDU)	Gold	
Czech Republic	Gold	25,000
Denmark (IFPI Danmark)	5× Platinum	100,000^{‡}
Finland (Musiikkituottajat)	Platinum	62,365
France (SNEP)	2× Gold	200,000^{*}
Germany (BVMI)	3× Gold	750,000^{^}
Greece (IFPI Greece)	Gold	15,000^{^}
Indonesia	3× Platinum	150,000
Ireland (IRMA)	3× Platinum	45,000^{^}
Israel	Gold	
Italy (FIMI) original release	4× Platinum	400,000^{*}
Italy (FIMI) sales since 2009	3× Platinum	150,000^{‡}
Japan (RIAJ)	Platinum	200,000^{^}
Mexico (AMPROFON)	Platinum	150,000^{^}
Netherlands (NVPI)	2× Platinum	200,000^{^}
New Zealand (RMNZ)	8× Platinum	120,000^{^}
Norway (IFPI Norway)	Platinum	50,000^{*}
Philippines (PARI)	Platinum	40,000^{*}
Poland (ZPAV)	Platinum	100,000^{*}
Portugal (AFP) original release	2× Platinum	80,000^{^}
Portugal (AFP) re-release	Gold	3,500^{‡}
Singapore (RIAS)	Gold	7,500^{*}
Spain (Promusicae)	2× Platinum	200,000^{^}
Sweden (GLF)	2× Platinum	160,000^{^}
Switzerland (IFPI Switzerland)	2× Platinum	100,000^{^}
Thailand	Gold	20,000
United Kingdom (BPI)	5× Platinum	1,500,000^{‡}
United States (RIAA)	8× Platinum	8,000,000^{‡}
Uruguay (CUD)	Platinum	6,000^{^}
Summaries
Europe (IFPI)	4× Platinum	4,500,000
^{*} Sales figures based on certification alone.^{^} Shipments figures based on certification alone.^{‡} Sales+streaming figures based on certification alone.

== Bibliography ==
- Apter, Jeff (2005). Fornication: The Red Hot Chili Peppers Story. London: Omnibus Press. ISBN 1-84449-381-4.
- Kiedis, Anthony; Sloman, Larry (2004). Scar Tissue. New York City: Hyperion. ISBN 1-4013-0101-0.
- Larkin, Colin. Red Hot Chili Peppers – Californication." Encyclopedia of Popular Music, 4th ed. Oxford Music Online. Oxford University Press. Web. September 27, 2016.
- Milner, Greg (2009). Perfecting Sound Forever: An Aural History of Recorded Music. London: Faber and Faber. ISBN 978-0-571-21165-4.
