= Parallel Universe (song) =

Song by Red Hot Chili Peppers

Promotional single by Red Hot Chili Peppers

from the album Californication
- Released: March 24, 2001
- Recorded: 1999
- Genre: Alternative rock, progressive rock, hard rock
- Length: 4:29
- Label: Warner Bros.
- Songwriters: Flea, John Frusciante, Anthony Kiedis, Chad Smith
- Producer: Rick Rubin

Red Hot Chili Peppers singles chronology
"Road Trippin'" (2000)	"Parallel Universe" (2001)	"By the Way" (2002)

"Parallel Universe" is a radio promotional single by the Red Hot Chili Peppers from their 1999 album Californication and was released in 2001 as the album's sixth and final single. Although it never was released as a tangible CD single, it charted on the US Modern Rock Tracks at number 37 during the week of March 24, 2001, and appeared on Greatest Hits.

== Background ==
The song is one of the heaviest on the album in terms of distortion. It is the first song in which bassist Flea plays with a pick, contrary to the funk-oriented basslines he was typically associated with. Anthony Kiedis' vocals are subdued during the verses, reflecting an approach towards melodic balladry, while similarly the song lyrically tackles darker, more introspective themes than those that the band generally had a reputation for. The song lacks backing vocals, which are on almost every other track on Californication.

Despite only being a promotional single, "Parallel Universe" remains a live favorite in the band's setlists and has been performed over 330 times since its release, making it one of the band's most performed songs since its first performance in 1998. During the By the Way Tour, the band often performed a tease of Fugazi's "Latest Disgrace" prior to the song. Since then, it has only returned once during the Unlimited Love Tour in November 2023.

No music video was made for the single.

== Personnel ==
- Anthony Kiedis – vocals
- John Frusciante – guitar
- Flea – bass
- Chad Smith – drums, shaker

== Charts ==
Chart (2001)	Peak position
US Alternative Airplay (Billboard)	37

== Certifications ==
Region	Certification	Certified units/sales
New Zealand (RMNZ)	Gold	15,000^{‡}
United States (RIAA)	Gold	500,000^{‡}
^{‡} Sales+streaming figures based on certification alone.
