= Californication (song) =

2000 single by Red Hot Chili Peppers

Single by Red Hot Chili Peppers

from the album Californication
- B-side: "I Could Have Lied" (live); "End of Show Brisbane" (live)
- Released: June 2000
- Genre: Alternative rock
- Length: 5:21 (album version); 5:29 (original version); 3:26 (radio edit)
- Label: Warner Bros.
- Songwriters: Anthony Kiedis; Chad Smith; Flea; John Frusciante
- Producer: Rick Rubin

Red Hot Chili Peppers singles chronology
"Otherside" (1999)	"Californication" (2000)	"Road Trippin'" (2000)

Music video
- "Californication" on YouTube

"Californication" is a song by the American rock band the Red Hot Chili Peppers from their seventh album, Californication (1999). Released as a single in June 2000, it reached number 69 on the US Billboard Hot 100, number 16 on the UK Singles Chart, and number one on both the Billboard Mainstream Rock Tracks and Modern Rock Tracks charts.

== Composition ==
The song begins in the key of A minor with Frusciante picking the chords of Am and F for twelve measures, before picking the chords of C-G-F-Dm then going back and picking Am and F for eight more measures before picking C-G-F-Dm again. For the pre-chorus Frusciante then strums a combination of Am and Fmaj7 chords for twelve measures, until the chorus when he strums the chords C-Gmaj7-Dm9-Am, then C-G-Dm9. It is notable for its sparse combination of guitar and bass notes in the main riff; Frusciante drew inspiration from "Carnage Visors" by The Cure.

== Music video ==
The video, directed by Jonathan Dayton and Valerie Faris, takes the form of a fictional open world video game that depicts each of the band members on some sort of adventure in a California setting, particularly San Francisco and Los Angeles, which ends when the world is ravaged by an earthquake and the avatars are replaced by the live action band members. The music video for "Californication" is the group's most watched video on YouTube, having officially reached a billion views on December 5, 2022.

=== Video game ===
On March 1, 2022, Spanish game developer Miquel Camps Orteza created a video game based on the song's music video. The player plays as one of the four band members. The game has seven different levels, each based on a scene from the music video. Orteza wrote, “I wanted to play that game so bad! It's 2022 and I haven't seen anyone made the game so I challenged myself to create it. I have selected some epic moments from the video and turned into 7 levels each one with different game mechanics, I hope you like this game."

== Critical reception ==
"Californication" was named the Red Hot Chili Peppers' best song by both Kerrang and Rolling Stone.

== Formats and track listings ==
CD single 1 9362 44907 2

1. "Californication" – 5:21
2. "I Could Have Lied" (Live) – 4:26
3. "End of Show Brisbane" (Live) – 8:11

CD single 2 9362 44908 2

1. "Californication" – 5:21
2. "I Could Have Lied" (Live) – 4:26
3. "End of Show State College" (Live) – 9:27

EP 9362 44872 2

1. "Californication" – 5:21
2. "End of Show Brisbane" (Live) – 8:11
3. "I Could Have Lied" (Live) – 4:26
4. "End of Show State College" (Live) – 9:27

== Personnel ==
Red Hot Chili Peppers

- Anthony Kiedis – lead vocals
- John Frusciante – guitars, backing vocals, synth
- Flea – bass
- Chad Smith – drums

Additional musician

- Greg Kurstin – keyboards

== Charts ==
=== Weekly charts ===
Chart (2000)	Peak position
Australia (ARIA)	44
Belgium (Ultratip Bubbling Under Flanders)	6
Belgium (Ultratip Bubbling Under Wallonia)	9
Canada Top Singles (RPM)	59
Canada Rock/Alternative (RPM)	1
Colombia (Notimex)	2
El Salvador (Notimex)	6
Europe (Eurochart Hot 100)	42
Germany (GfK)	63
Iceland (Íslenski Listinn Topp 40)	1
Ireland (IRMA)	24
Italy (FIMI)	19
Netherlands (Dutch Top 40)	9
Netherlands (Single Top 100)	41
New Zealand (Recorded Music NZ)	8
Poland Airplay (Music & Media)	10
Scottish Singles Sales (Official Charts)	10
Sweden (Sverigetopplistan)	37
UK Singles (Official Charts)	16
US Billboard Hot 100	69
US Adult Alternative Airplay (Billboard)	17
US Alternative Airplay (Billboard)	1
US Adult Pop Airplay (Billboard)	28
US Mainstream Rock Airplay (Billboard)	1
US Pop Airplay (Billboard)	37

Chart (2024)	Peak position
Poland (Polish Airplay Top 100)	93

=== Year-end charts ===
Chart (2000)	Position
Iceland (Íslenski Listinn Topp 40)	36
Netherlands (Dutch Top 40)	73
US Adult Top 40 (Billboard)	93
US Mainstream Rock Tracks (Billboard)	15
US Modern Rock Tracks (Billboard)	15

== Certifications ==
Region	Certification	Certified units/sales
Canada (Music Canada)	7× Platinum	560,000^{‡}
Denmark (IFPI Danmark)	Platinum	90,000^{‡}
Italy (FIMI) sales since 2009	2× Platinum	100,000^{‡}
New Zealand (RMNZ)	7× Platinum	210,000^{‡}
Spain (Promusicae)	2× Platinum	120,000^{‡}
United Kingdom (BPI)	3× Platinum	1,800,000^{‡}
United States (RIAA)	6× Platinum	6,000,000^{‡}
^{‡} Sales+streaming figures based on certification alone.

== Release history ==
Region	Date	Format(s)	Label(s)	Ref(s).
Europe	June 2000	CD	Warner Bros.	
United States	June 13, 2000	Mainstream rock; active rock radio	Warner Bros.	
Japan	July 12, 2000	CD	Warner Bros.	
United Kingdom	August 7, 2000	CD; cassette	Warner Bros.	
United States	September 11, 2000	Hot adult contemporary; modern adult contemporary radio	Warner Bros.	
United States	September 12, 2000	Contemporary hit radio	Warner Bros.	
