= Scar Tissue =

1999 single by Red Hot Chili Peppers

Single by Red Hot Chili Peppers

from the album Californication
- B-side: "Gong Li"; "Instrumental #1"
- Released: May 25, 1999
- Genre: Blues rock; alternative rock
- Length: 3:35
- Label: Warner Bros.
- Songwriters: Flea; John Frusciante; Anthony Kiedis; Chad Smith
- Producer: Rick Rubin

Red Hot Chili Peppers singles chronology
"Love Rollercoaster" (1996)	"Scar Tissue" (1999)	"Around the World" (1999)

Music video
- "Scar Tissue" on YouTube

"Scar Tissue" is the first single from American rock band Red Hot Chili Peppers' seventh studio album, Californication (1999). Released on May 25, 1999, the song spent a then-record 16 consecutive weeks atop the US Billboard Hot Modern Rock Tracks chart as well as 10 weeks atop the Billboard Mainstream Rock Tracks chart, and it reached number nine on the Billboard Hot 100. "Scar Tissue" was also successful in Iceland, New Zealand, and Canada, reaching numbers one, three, and four, respectively. In the United Kingdom, it charted at number 15 on the UK Singles Chart.

"Scar Tissue" is considered to be representative of the new, more melodic rock sound the band experimented with on Californication (in contrast with the psychedelic One Hot Minute, and dry funk of Blood Sugar Sex Magik). The song is notable for its mellow opening guitar riff and for its slide guitar solos throughout. Guitar World placed the song's guitar solo 63rd in its list of the "100 Greatest Guitar Solos". "Scar Tissue" won a Grammy Award for Best Rock Song in 2000. In 2004, lead vocalist Anthony Kiedis published an autobiography titled after the song.

== Music video ==
The music video for "Scar Tissue" was directed by Stéphane Sednaoui, who also directed the video for "Give It Away". The opening shot is of guitarist John Frusciante driving down a strip of desert highway, a metaphor for Frusciante's return to the band (he does not drive in real life). The four members are battered, beaten and bandaged. They are traveling in a rusty wreck and playing broken instruments on the comeback trail. The video ends after a melancholic 30-second Frusciante guitar solo at the moment of sunset, with John tossing the broken, stringless guitar from the car. The car Frusciante pretended to drive for the video was a 1967 Pontiac Catalina convertible. A very similar concept was considered, then scrapped, for the earlier "Soul to Squeeze" video. Prior to the video shoot, Kiedis had his hair cut and bleached his brown hair to platinum blond, a look he kept throughout the promotion and tour for Californication. The video was filmed in California's Mojave Desert.

== Reception ==
"Scar Tissue" is widely regarded as one of the band's best songs. In 2021, Kerrang ranked the song number three on their list of the 20 greatest Red Hot Chili Peppers songs, and in 2022, Rolling Stone ranked the song number two on their list of the 40 greatest Red Hot Chili Peppers songs.

== Live performances ==
"Scar Tissue" has been a live staple in the band's setlists since its first performance in 1998 making it the band's fifth most performed song overall. American band Mr. Bungle performed a mock version of the song in 1999, as part of a Halloween concert parodying Red Hot Chili Peppers.

== Track listings ==
CD single (1999) (Catalogue Number 9 16913–2)

1. "Scar Tissue" (album) – 3:37
2. "Gong Li" (previously unreleased) – 3:42
3. "Instrumental #1" (previously unreleased) – 2:48

CD single (Slipcase) (1999)

1. "Scar Tissue" (album) – 3:37
2. "Gong Li" (previously unreleased) – 3:42

Cassette single (1999)

1. "Scar Tissue" (album)
2. "Gong Li" (previously unreleased)

== Personnel ==
Red Hot Chili Peppers

- Anthony Kiedis – lead vocals
- John Frusciante – lead, slide, and rhythm guitar, backing vocals
- Flea – bass, backing vocals
- Chad Smith – drums, shaker

== Charts ==
=== Weekly charts ===
Chart (1999)	Peak position
Australia (ARIA)	15
Belgium (Ultratip Bubbling Under Flanders)	11
Canada Top Singles (RPM)	4
Canada Adult Contemporary (RPM)	65
Canada Rock/Alternative (RPM)	1
Canada CHR (Nielsen BDS)	11
Dominican Republic (Notimex)	3
Europe (Eurochart Hot 100)	59
Finland (Suomen virallinen lista)	16
France (SNEP)	66
Germany (GfK)	75
Iceland (Íslenski Listinn Topp 40)	1
Ireland (IRMA)	16
Italy (Musica e dischi)	11
Italy Airplay (Music & Media)	1
Netherlands (Dutch Top 40)	24
Netherlands (Single Top 100)	38
New Zealand (Recorded Music NZ)	3
Poland Airplay (Music & Media)	2
Scottish Singles Sales (Official Charts)	11
UK Singles (Official Charts)	15
US Billboard Hot 100	9
US Adult Alternative Airplay (Billboard)	2
US Adult Pop Airplay (Billboard)	11
US Alternative Airplay (Billboard)	1
US Mainstream Rock Airplay (Billboard)	1
US Pop Airplay (Billboard)	12

Chart (2026)	Peak position
Global 200 (Billboard)	144

=== Year-end charts ===
Chart (1999)	Position
Australia (ARIA)	69
Brazil (Crowley)	98
Canada Top Singles (RPM)	40
Canada Rock/Alternative (RPM)	1
Netherlands (Dutch Top 40)	162
New Zealand (RIANZ)	46
US Billboard Hot 100	34
US Adult Top 40 (Billboard)	40
US Mainstream Rock Tracks (Billboard)	3
US Mainstream Top 40 (Billboard)	50
US Modern Rock Tracks (Billboard)	3
US Triple-A (Billboard)	5

== Certifications ==
Region	Certification	Certified units/sales
Australia (ARIA)	Gold	35,000^{^}
Canada (Music Canada)	6× Platinum	480,000^{‡}
Denmark (IFPI Danmark)	Gold	45,000^{‡}
Germany (BVMI)	Gold	300,000^{‡}
Italy (FIMI)	Platinum	50,000^{‡}
New Zealand (RMNZ)	7× Platinum	210,000^{‡}
Portugal (AFP)	2× Platinum	20,000^{‡}
Spain (Promusicae)	Platinum	60,000^{‡}
United Kingdom (BPI)	2× Platinum	1,200,000^{‡}
United States (RIAA)	6× Platinum	6,000,000^{‡}
^{^} Shipments figures based on certification alone.^{‡} Sales+streaming figures based on certification alone.

== Release history ==
Region	Date	Format(s)	Label(s)	Ref(s).
United States	May 24, 1999	Rock radio	Warner Bros.	
Europe	May 25, 1999	CD	Warner Bros.	
United Kingdom	May 31, 1999	CD; cassette	Warner Bros.	
Japan	June 9, 1999	CD	Warner Bros.	
United States	June 21, 1999	Hot adult contemporary; modern adult contemporary radio	Warner Bros.	
United States	June 22, 1999	Contemporary hit radio	Warner Bros.	
United States	September 14, 1999	CD; cassette	Warner Bros.	
Canada	October 12, 1999	CD	Warner Bros.	

== See also ==
- List of number-one mainstream rock hits (United States)
- Number one modern rock hits of 1999
- List of RPM Rock/Alternative number-one singles
