= Cardiff, Wales: 6/23/04 =

Live album by Red Hot Chili Peppers
- Released: March 17, 2015
- Recorded: June 23, 2004
- Venues: Millennium Stadium, Cardiff, Wales
- Genres: Alternative rock; funk rock
- Length: 102:49
- Language: English
- Producer: Dave Rat

Red Hot Chili Peppers chronology
I'm with You World Tour (2014)	Cardiff, Wales: 6/23/04 (2015)	The Getaway (2016)

Cardiff, Wales: 6/23/04 is an "official" bootleg live album by the Red Hot Chili Peppers, released in 2015. It was recorded on June 23, 2004 in Cardiff, Wales at Millennium Stadium during the band's Roll on the Red Tour. The show is notable for featuring the only officially released version of "Mini-Epic (Kill for Your Country)". The album consists of a soundboard recording of the full show from that date, and an MP3 version is available as a free download through the band's website. A lossless (FLAC) version of the album is also available for purchase.

== Background ==
Drummer Chad Smith on the show: "Cardiff Stadium was a warm up for the 3 Hyde Park shows. James Brown opened. And I think it may be the only time we played Mini Epic live."

The "3 Hyde Park shows" Smith referred to (June 19, 20, and 25, 2004) are represented on the band's first live album, Red Hot Chili Peppers Live in Hyde Park which contains a selection of songs from all three shows. Unlike that album, Cardiff, Wales: 6/23/04 consists of all the songs from a single concert on June 23, 2004. The song selection on the album effectively ignores the group's first four studio albums, in addition to their sixth, and includes tracks only from the band's fifth (Blood Sugar Sex Magik), seventh, and eighth studio albums.

The show features a live version of the unreleased song, "Mini-Epic (Kill for Your Country)". The band went into the studio to record additional tracks for the band's 2003 Greatest Hits album and a studio version was said to have been intended for inclusion on an anti-war compilation album that producer Rick Rubin was putting together, which ultimately never materialized. The song was only played six times during the Roll on the Red Tour.

== Track listing ==
All tracks are written by Anthony Kiedis, Flea, John Frusciante, and Chad Smith except where noted.

Disc one
No.	Title	Writer(s)	Length
1.	"Intro Jam"		2:02
2.	"Can't Stop"		5:39
3.	"Around the World"		6:14
4.	"I Feel Love" (Donna Summer cover)	Donna Summer, Giorgio Moroder, Pete Bellotte	1:33
5.	"Scar Tissue"		4:13
6.	"By the Way"		5:16
7.	"Fortune Faded"		3:54
8.	"Otherside"		5:14
9.	"Emit Remmus"		4:46
10.	"The Zephyr Song"		4:13
11.	"Get on Top"		3:34
12.	"Brandy (You're a Fine Girl)" (Looking Glass cover)	Elliot Lurie	3:43
13.	"Throw Away Your Television"		7:19
14.	"I Like Dirt"		3:49
15.	"Mini-Epic (Kill for Your Country)"		3:17
16.	"Californication"		8:09
17.	"Right on Time" (Contains the intro of Joy Division's "Transmission")		2:43

Disc two
No.	Title	Writer(s)	Length
1.	"Parallel Universe"		7:31
2.	"John Treats Flea's Horn"		2:53
3.	"Under the Bridge"		4:37
4.	"Black Cross" (45 Grave cover)	Dinah Cancer, Paul Cutler, Don Bolles	3:50
5.	"Give It Away"		8:11
Total length:			102:49

== Personnel ==
- Flea – bass, backing vocals, trumpet
- John Frusciante – guitar, backing vocals, lead vocals on "I Feel Love"
- Anthony Kiedis – lead vocals
- Chad Smith – drums
