= By the Way Tour =

2002–03 concert tour by the Red Hot Chili Peppers

- Tour by Red Hot Chili Peppers
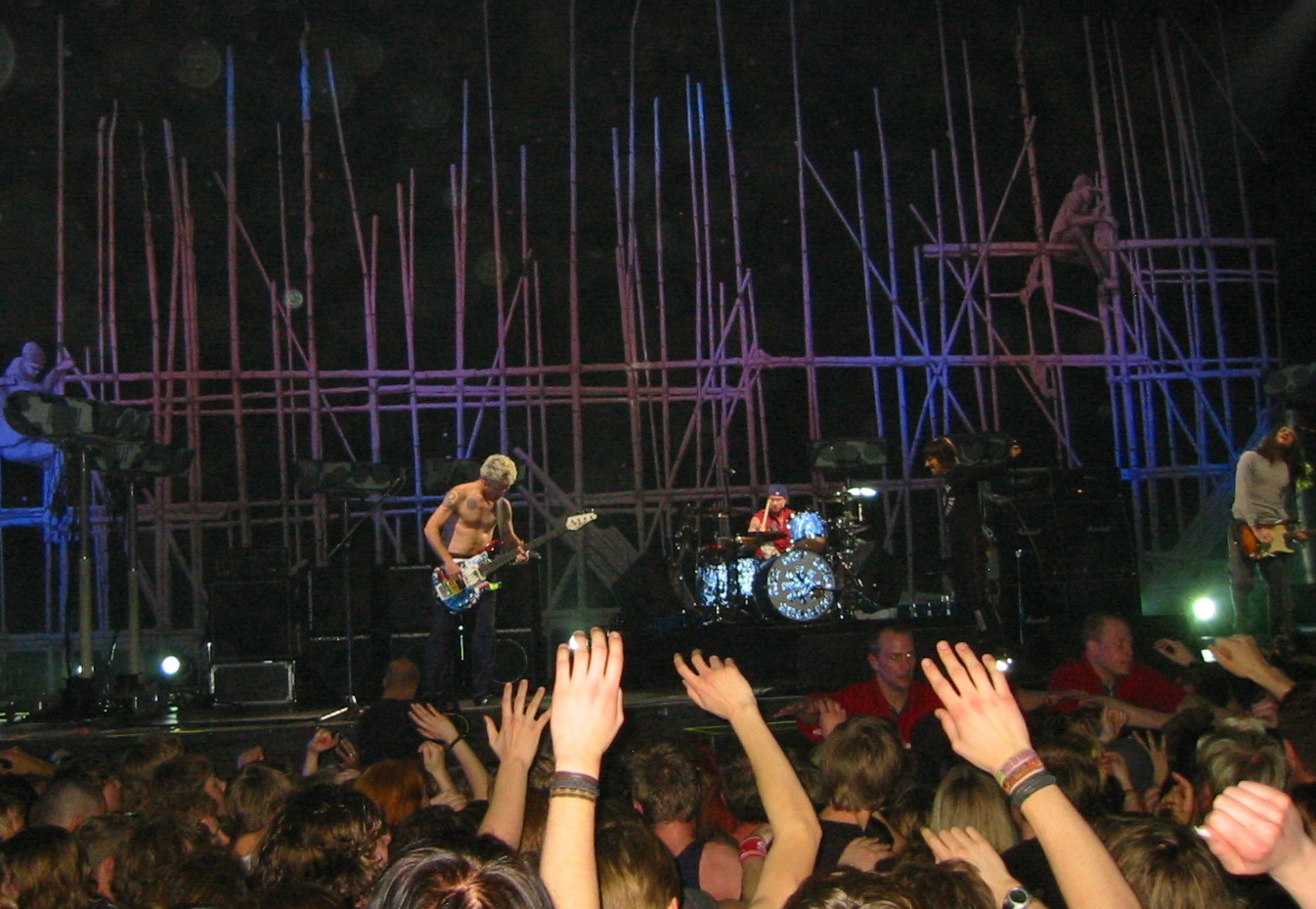
- The March 29, 2003 concert in Stockholm
- Associated album: By the Way
- Start date: May 26, 2002
- End date: October 27, 2003
- Legs: 14
- No. of shows: 69 in North America; 57 in Europe; 6 in South America; 11 in Asia; 9 in Oceania; 152 Total

Red Hot Chili Peppers concert chronology
- Red Hot Chili Peppers 2001 Tour (2001); By the Way Tour (2002–2003); Roll on the Red Tour (2004)

The By the Way Tour was a worldwide concert tour by the Red Hot Chili Peppers in support of their eighth studio album, By the Way.

A DVD of the August 23, 2003 concert in Slane Castle, titled Live at Slane Castle, was released after the tour ended.

== Background ==
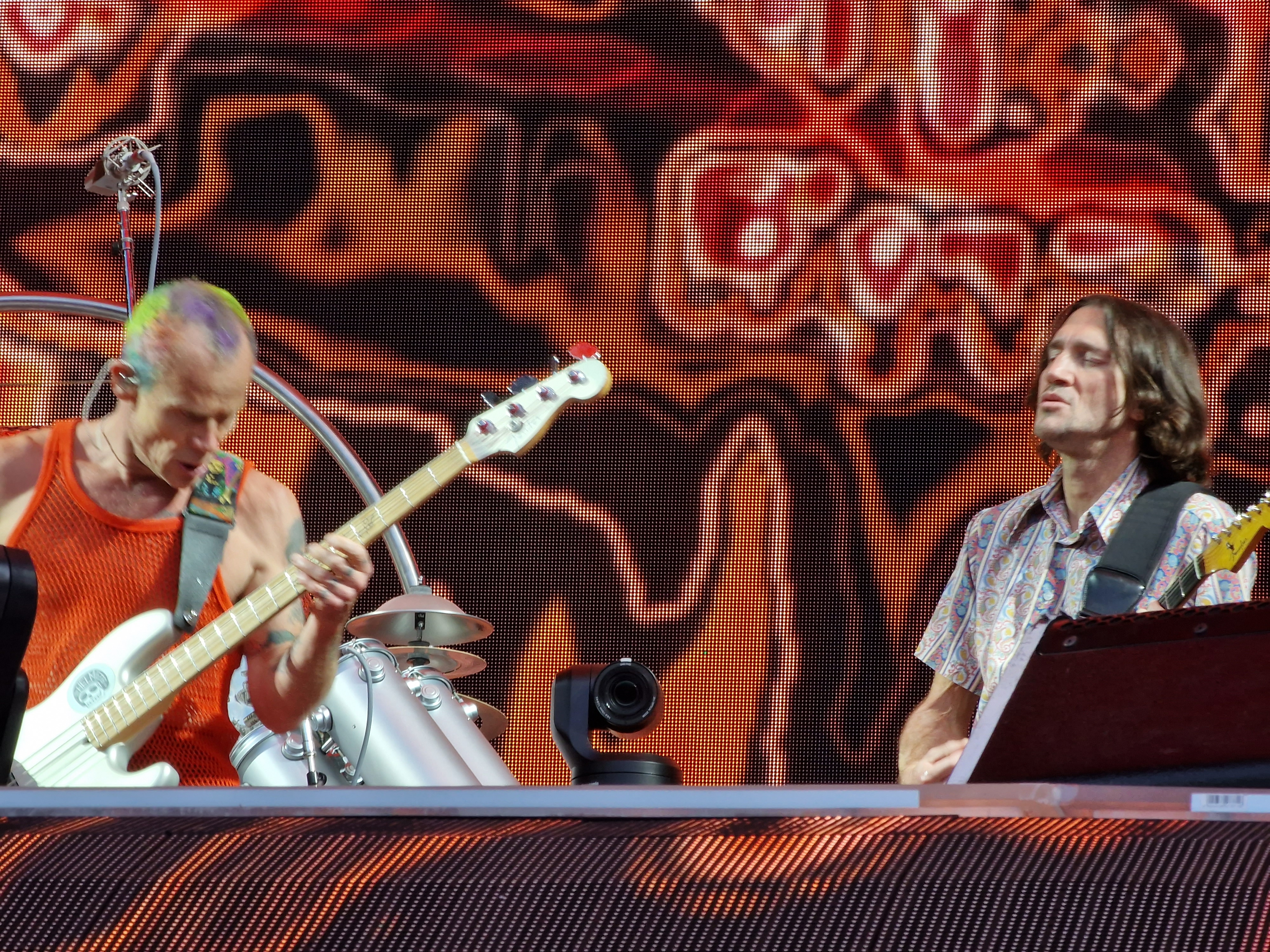
Tensions between Flea and John Frusciante (pictured in 2022) during the recording of By the Way ended during this tour.

The songs of By the Way sound more melodic than the previous funk-rock releases. This was made possible by John Frusciante, who wanted the album to have a more atmospheric soundscape. (Note: He did this by layering his guitar parts and using numerous effects pedals.) However, Flea disagreed with the approach the album was going, but felt that he wasn't heard. It reached the point that he almost quit the band after the album was released. Fortunately, Flea and Frusciante were able to reconcile, and the band were able to start the tour.

Afterwards, the band played a concert at Ellis Island (Note: The venue was picked to revitalize lower Manhattan following the September 11 attacks, and all revenues were given to the appropriate charitable groups.), titled "Pep Rally" and sponsored by K-Rock. The New York Post declared the show "one of the top concerts of the year." Other notable concerts in this tour include the May 20, 2003 concert the Madison Square Garden, which was reported by Kelefa Sanneh of The New York Times as an "extraordinary two-hour performance," and the 2003 Slane Festival concert, which was officially released as Live at Slane Castle.

== Songs performed ==
=== Originals ===
Song	Release (Bolded if studio album)
"Get Up and Jump" (tease)	**The Red Hot Chili Peppers**
"Out In L.A." (tease)	**The Red Hot Chili Peppers**
"Police Helicopter"	**The Red Hot Chili Peppers**
"You Always Sing the Same"
"Freaky Styley"	**Freaky Styley**
"The Brothers Cup" (tease)	**Freaky Styley**
"Me and My Friends"	**The Uplift Mofo Party Plan**
"Skinny Sweaty Man"	**The Uplift Mofo Party Plan**
"Apache Rose Peacock" (tease)	**Blood Sugar Sex Magik**
"Blood Sugar Sex Magik"	**Blood Sugar Sex Magik**
"Breaking the Girl"	**Blood Sugar Sex Magik**
"Give It Away"	**Blood Sugar Sex Magik**
"I Could Have Lied"	**Blood Sugar Sex Magik**
"If You Have to Ask"	**Blood Sugar Sex Magik**
"Mellowship Slinky in B Major" (tease)	**Blood Sugar Sex Magik**
"Sir Psycho Sexy"	**Blood Sugar Sex Magik**
"Suck My Kiss"	**Blood Sugar Sex Magik**
"The Power of Equality"	**Blood Sugar Sex Magik**
"The Righteous & the Wicked" (tease)	**Blood Sugar Sex Magik**
"Under the Bridge"	**Blood Sugar Sex Magik**
"Soul to Squeeze"	Coneheads: Music from the Motion Picture Soundtrack
"Flea Fly"	Out in L.A.
"Pea" (Flea only)	**One Hot Minute**
"Around the World"	**Californication**
"Californication"	**Californication**
"Otherside"	**Californication**
"Parallel Universe"	**Californication**
“Purple Stain”	**Californication**
"Right on Time"	**Californication**
"Scar Tissue"	**Californication**
"By the Way"	**By the Way**
"Cabron"	**By the Way**
"Can't Stop"	**By the Way**
"Don't Forget Me"	**By the Way**
"I Could Die for You"	**By the Way**
"Minor Thing"	**By the Way**
"The Zephyr Song"	**By the Way**
"This Is the Place"	**By the Way**
"Throw Away Your Television" (Note: From August 13, 2003 to the last concert of the Stadium Arcadium World Tour, the band segues the ending to a jam wherein Anthony sings "Don't You Ever Leave!" This jam was briefly revived on May 28, 2024, during the Global Stadium Tour, but Anthony didn't sing the aforementioned line.)	**By the Way**
"Universally Speaking"	**By the Way**
"Venice Queen"	**By the Way**
"Warm Tape"	**By the Way**
"Time"	B-side of By the Way

=== Cover songs (used as intros or during jams unless otherwise noted) ===
Song	Original Artist
"All the Young Dudes" (John only)	Mott the Hoople
"Blue Monday" (tease)	New Order
"Both Sides, Now" (John only)	Joni Mitchell
"Ça plane pour moi" (Flea only)	Plastic Bertrand
"Cold Sweat"	James Brown
"Cosmic Slop" (tease)	Funkadelic
"Hardcore Jollies"	Funkadelic
"Red Hot Mama" (tease)	Funkadelic
"What Is Soul?"	Funkadelic
"Cosmic Dancer" (John only)	T. Rex
"Custard Pie" (tease)	Led Zeppelin
"Rock and Roll" (tease)	Led Zeppelin
"Dazed and Confused" (tease)	Jake Holmes (Note: The band's cover was much more akin to Led Zeppelin's cover.)
"Detroit Rock City" (John only)	Kiss
"Great Expectations" (John only)	Kiss
"Love Gun" (John only)	Kiss
"Dig a Pony" (tease)	The Beatles
"I've Just Seen a Face" (John only)	The Beatles
"Epic Problem" (John only)	Fugazi
"Latest Disgrace" (Note: The band's cover was released on Live at Slane Castle.) (tease)	Fugazi
"Fire" (Note: The band's cover was released on Mother's Milk.) (full song)	The Jimi Hendrix Experience
"Forming" (John only)	Germs
"Fox on the Run" (John only)	The Sweet
"Havana Affair" (Note: The band's cover was released on We're a Happy Family: A Tribute to Ramones.) (full song)	Ramones
"Honeysuckle Rose" (Flea only)	Fats Waller
"I Feel Love" (Note: The band's cover was released on Live in Hyde Park.) (John only)	Donna Summer
"Working the Midnight Shift" (John only)	Donna Summer
"I Love Livin' in the City" (John only)	Fear
"I'm Eighteen" (John only)	Alice Cooper
"Lament" (John only)	King Crimson
"London Calling" (tease)	The Clash
"Maybe" (John only)	The Chantels
"My Automobile" (Flea only)	Parliament
"Presence of a Brain" (John only)	Parliament
"One Day (at a Time)" (John only)	John Lennon
"Rapper's Delight"	The Sugarhill Gang
"Red Tape" (full song)	Circle Jerks
"Ride Into the Sun" (John only)	The Velvet Underground
"Rocky" (John only)	Butthole Surfers
"Search and Destroy" (Note: The band's cover was released on the B-side of Give It Away.) (full song)	The Stooges
"See Emily Play" (John only)	Pink Floyd
"Teddy Bear" (John only)	Peter Gabriel
"They're Red Hot" (Note: The band's cover was released on Blood Sugar Sex Magik.) (full song)	Robert Johnson
"Tiny Dancer" (John only)	Elton John
"Wilderness" (John only)	Joy Division
"You're Gonna Get Yours" (tease)	Public Enemy

== Tour dates ==
Date	City/Town	Country	Venue	Opening Acts
North America I
May 17, 2002	Orange	United States	Vans Skatepark	
Europe I
May 26, 2002 (Note: This performance was part of the Festivalbar.)	Naples	Italy	Piazza del Plebiscito	
May 27, 2002 (Note: This performance was pre-taped for CD:UK and aired on July 13.)	London	England	The London Studios	
May 30, 2002 (Note: This performance was pre-taped for Top of the Pops and aired on July 5.)	London	England	Television Centre	
May 31, 2002	London	England	Television Centre (Note: This performance was for Friday Night with Jonathan Ross.)	
May 31, 2002	London	England	The Garage	
June 4, 2002	Paris	France	Olympia	
June 6, 2002 (Note: This performance was for TV total.)	Cologne	Germany	Capitol	
June 7, 2002	Hamburg	Germany	Saturn Parkhausdach	
June 10, 2002	Madrid	Spain	Círculo de Bellas Artes	
June 15, 2002 (Note: This performance was part of the Heineken Jammin' Festival.)	Imola	Italy	Autodromo Internazionale Enzo e Dino Ferrari	
June 17, 2002	Barcelona	Spain	Pavelló Olímpic de Badalona	
June 19, 2002	Nice	France	Palais Nikaïa	Garbage
June 20, 2002	Lyon	France	Halle Tony Garnier	Garbage
June 22, 2002 (Note: This performance was part of the Southside Festival.)	Neuhausen ob Eck	Germany	Neuhausen ob Eck Airfield	
June 23, 2002 (Note: This performance was part of the Hurricane Festival.)	Scheeßel	Germany	Eichenring	
June 25, 2002	Dublin	Ireland	Lansdowne Road	
June 26, 2002	London	England	London Arena	Andrew W.K.
June 28, 2002 (Note: This performance was part of the Roskilde Festival.)	Roskilde	Denmark	Festivalpladsen	
June 29, 2002 (Note: This performance was part of Rock Werchter.)	Werchter	Belgium	Festivalpark	
North America II
July 9, 2002	New York City	United States	Ellis Island	
July 10, 2002	Atlanta	United States	Dekalb Civic Center	
Asia I
July 26, 2002 (Note: This performance was part of the One Hot Day Festival.)	Seoul	South Korea	Chamsil Sports Complex	
July 28, 2002 (Note: This performance was part of the Fuji Rock Festival.)	Yuzawa	Japan	Naeba Ski Resort	
North America III
July 31, 2002	Honolulu	United States	Neal S. Blaisdell Center	
August 3, 2002	Paradise	United States	Fountains at Flamingo Apartments	
August 7, 2002	Toronto	Canada	102.1 the Edge Studios	
August 8, 2002 (Note: This performance was a house party sponsored by Molson Brewery.)	Kawartha Lakes	Canada	Cottage	
September 16, 2002 (Note: This performance was for Top of the Pops.)	Los Angeles	United States	Hollywood Center Studios	
September 18, 2002	Los Angeles	United States	Hollywood Center Studios	
September 27, 2002	Guadalajara	Mexico	Plaza de Toros Nuevo Progreso	
September 29, 2002	Mexico City	Mexico	Foro Sol	
October 2, 2002	Heredia	Costa Rica	Estadio Eladio Rosabal Cordero	
October 4, 2002	Panama City	Panama	Centro de Convenciones de Atlapa	
South America
October 6, 2002	Caracas	Venezuela	Valle del Pop	
October 9, 2002	Santiago	Chile	Pista Atlética	Los Tetas
October 11, 2002	Rio de Janeiro	Brazil	ATL Hall	
October 12, 2002	São Paulo	Brazil	Estádio do Pacaembu	Detonautas Roque Clube
October 14, 2002	Porto Alegre	Brazil	Gigantinho	
October 16, 2002	Buenos Aires	Argentina	Estadio Antonio Vespucio Liberti	Dios Los Cría, Nativo
North America IV
October 26, 2002 (Note: This performance was for the KROQ Halloween Costume Ball.)	Los Angeles	United States	Wiltern Theatre	
Asia II
November 2, 2002	Chiba	Japan	Makuhari Messe	
November 3, 2002	Chiba	Japan	Makuhari Messe	
November 5, 2002	Osaka	Japan	Osaka-jō Hall	
November 6, 2002	Osaka	Japan	Osaka-jō Hall	
November 10, 2002	Saitama	Japan	Saitama Super Arena	
November 12, 2002	Fukuoka	Japan	Marine Messe Fukuoka	
November 13, 2002	Nagoya	Japan	Nagoya Rainbow Hall	
Oceania
November 22, 2002	Christchurch	New Zealand	Queen Elizabeth II Park	Quirk, Papa Roach
November 24, 2002	Auckland	New Zealand	Western Springs Stadium	Quirk, Papa Roach
November 26, 2002	Brisbane	Australia	Brisbane Entertainment Centre	Quirk, Papa Roach
November 27, 2002	Brisbane	Australia	Brisbane Entertainment Centre	Quirk, Papa Roach
November 29, 2002	Sydney	Australia	Sydney Football Stadium	Quirk, Papa Roach
December 1, 2002	Melbourne	Australia	Telstra Dome	Quirk, Papa Roach
December 3, 2002	Adelaide	Australia	Adelaide Entertainment Centre	Quirk, Papa Roach
December 5, 2002	Perth	Australia	Nova 93.7 Studios	
December 6, 2002	Perth	Australia	Dome at Crown Perth	Quirk, Papa Roach
Asia III
December 8, 2002	Singapore		Singapore Indoor Stadium	
December 10, 2002	Bangkok	Thailand	IMPACT Arena	
North America V
December 20, 2002	Park City	United States	Park City Mountain Resort	
December 30, 2002	Paradise	United States	The Joint	
December 31, 2002	Paradise	United States	The Joint	
Europe II/Deep in Your Steeze
January 24, 2003	Lisbon	Portugal	Pavilhão Atlântico	Toilet Böys
January 25, 2003	Lisbon	Portugal	Pavilhão Atlântico	Toilet Böys
January 27, 2003	Madrid	Spain	Palacio Vistalegre	Toilet Böys
January 28, 2003	Madrid	Spain	Palacio Vistalegre	Toilet Böys
January 30, 2003	Milan	Italy	FilaForum	Toilet Böys
January 31, 2003	Milan	Italy	FilaForum	Toilet Böys
February 2, 2003	Rome	Italy	PalaEUR	Toilet Böys
February 3, 2003	Rome	Italy	PalaEUR	Toilet Böys
February 5, 2003	Bologna	Italy	PalaMalaguti	Toilet Böys
February 7, 2003	Dortmund	Germany	Westfalenhallen	Toilet Böys
February 9, 2003	Dresden	Germany	Messehalle	Toilet Böys
February 10, 2003	Berlin	Germany	Velodrom	Toilet Böys
February 12, 2003	Paris	France	Palais Omnisports de Paris-Bercy	Toilet Böys
February 13, 2003	Paris	France	Palais Omnisports de Paris-Bercy	Toilet Böys
February 15, 2003 (Note: This performance was part of the Echo Music Prize.)	Berlin	Germany	Internationales Congress Centrum Berlin	
March 5, 2003	Glasgow	Scotland	Scottish Exhibition and Conference Centre	The Mars Volta
March 6, 2003	Glasgow	Scotland	Scottish Exhibition and Conference Centre	The Mars Volta
March 8, 2003	London	England	London Arena	The Mars Volta
March 9, 2003	London	England	London Arena	The Mars Volta
March 11, 2003	Manchester	England	Manchester Evening News Arena	The Mars Volta
March 12, 2003	Manchester	England	Manchester Evening News Arena	The Mars Volta
March 14, 2003	Antwerp	Belgium	Sportpaleis	The Mars Volta
March 16, 2003	Zürich	Switzerland	Hallenstadion	The Mars Volta
March 17, 2003	Munich	Germany	Olympiahalle	The Mars Volta
March 19, 2003	Rotterdam	Netherlands	Rotterdam Ahoy	The Mars Volta
March 20, 2003	Rotterdam	Netherlands	Rotterdam Ahoy	The Mars Volta
March 22, 2003	Hamburg	Germany	Color Line Arena	The Mars Volta
March 24, 2003	Helsinki	Finland	Hartwall Arena	The Mars Volta
March 25, 2003	Turku	Finland	Elysée Arena	The Mars Volta
March 27, 2003	Oslo	Norway	Oslo Spektrum	The Mars Volta
March 29, 2003	Stockholm	Sweden	Stockholm Globe Arena	The Mars Volta
North America VI
April 27, 2003 (Note: This performance was part of the Coachella Valley Music and Arts Festival. The music video of Universally Speaking was filmed before and during the concert.)	Indio	United States	Empire Polo Club	
May 1, 2003	Saint Paul	United States	Xcel Energy Center	The Mars Volta, Queens of the Stone Age
May 2, 2003	Madison	United States	Alliant Energy Center	The Mars Volta, Queens of the Stone Age
May 4, 2003	Omaha	United States	Omaha Civic Auditorium	The Mars Volta, Queens of the Stone Age
May 5, 2003	Kansas	United States	Kemper Arena	The Mars Volta, Queens of the Stone Age
May 7, 2003	St. Louis	United States	Savvis Center	The Mars Volta, Queens of the Stone Age
May 9, 2003	Moline	United States	The MARK of the Quad Cities	The Mars Volta, Queens of the Stone Age
May 10, 2003	Grand Rapids	United States	Van Andel Arena	The Mars Volta, Queens of the Stone Age
May 12, 2003	Ottawa	Canada	Corel Centre	The Mars Volta, Queens of the Stone Age
May 13, 2003	Toronto	Canada	Air Canada Centre	The Mars Volta, Queens of the Stone Age
May 15, 2003	Montreal	Canada	Centre Bell	The Mars Volta, Queens of the Stone Age
May 17, 2003	Albany	United States	Pepsi Arena	The Mars Volta, Queens of the Stone Age
May 19, 2003	East Rutherford	United States	Continental Airlines Arena	The Mars Volta, Queens of the Stone Age
May 20, 2003	New York City	United States	Madison Square Garden	The Mars Volta, Queens of the Stone Age
June 2, 2003	West Palm Beach	United States	Coral Sky Amphitheatre	Snoop Dogg
June 3, 2003	Orlando	United States	TD Waterhouse Centre	Snoop Dogg
June 5, 2003	Raleigh	United States	Alltel Pavilion	Snoop Dogg
June 6, 2003	Charlotte	United States	Verizon Wireless Amphitheatre	Snoop Dogg
June 8, 2003	Atlanta	United States	HiFi Buys Amphitheatre	Snoop Dogg
June 10, 2003	Bossier	United States	CenturyTel Center	Snoop Dogg
June 11, 2003	New Orleans	United States	New Orleans Arena	Snoop Dogg
June 13, 2003	Selma	United States	Verizon Wireless Amphitheater	Snoop Dogg
June 14, 2003	Houston	United States	Cynthia Woods Mitchell Pavilion	Snoop Dogg
June 16, 2003	Dallas	United States	Smirnoff Music Centre	Snoop Dogg
June 18, 2003	Oklahoma	United States	Ford Center	Snoop Dogg
June 20, 2003	Greenwood Village	United States	Fiddler's Green Amphitheatre	Snoop Dogg
June 21, 2003	Albuquerque	United States	ABQ Journal Pavilion	Snoop Dogg
Europe III
August 13, 2003 (Note: This concert was originally meant to happen on February 16, 2003, but was moved to the following date because of Anthony's voice problems.)	Stuttgart	Germany	Hanns-Martin-Schleyer-Halle	Killing Joke
August 16, 2003 (Note: This performance was part of the V Festival.)	Weston-under-Lizard	England	Weston Park	
August 17, 2003	Chelmsford	England	Hylands House	
August 19, 2003	Berlin	Germany	Parkbühne Wuhlheide	The Distillers
August 21, 2003	Duisburg	Germany	Landschaftspark Duisburg-Nord	The Ataris, The Distillers
August 23, 2003 (Note: This performance was part of the Slane Festival. I Feel Love and Soul to Squeeze were performed at the concert, but were cut from the DVD release.)	Slane	Ireland	Slane Castle	Halite, Morcheeba, Feeder, PJ Harvey, Queens of the Stone Age, Foo Fighters
August 24, 2003 (Note: This performance was part of the Big Day Out at the Green Festival.)	Glasgow	Scotland	Glasgow Green	The Distillers, Electric Six, PJ Harvey, Queens of the Stone Age, Foo Fighters
North America VII
September 6, 2003	Bristow	United States	Nissan Pavilion	French Toast, Queens of the Stone Age
September 7, 2003	Holmdel	United States	PNC Bank Arts Center	French Toast, Queens of the Stone Age
September 9, 2003	Amherst	United States	William D. Mullins Memorial Center	French Toast, Queens of the Stone Age
September 10, 2003	Mansfield	United States	Tweeter Center for the Performing Arts	French Toast, Queens of the Stone Age
September 12, 2003	Camden	United States	Tweeter Center	French Toast, Queens of the Stone Age
September 13, 2003	Wantagh	United States	Tommy Hilfiger at Jones Beach Theater	French Toast, Queens of the Stone Age
September 16, 2003	State College	United States	Bryce Jordan Center	French Toast, Queens of the Stone Age
September 18, 2003	Auburn Hills	United States	The Palace of Auburn Hills	French Toast, Queens of the Stone Age
September 19, 2003	Tinley Park	United States	Tweeter Center	French Toast, Queens of the Stone Age
September 21, 2003	Cuyahoga Falls	United States	Blossom Music Center	French Toast, Queens of the Stone Age
September 22, 2003	Pittsburgh	United States	Mellon Arena	French Toast, Queens of the Stone Age
September 24, 2003	East Lansing	United States	Breslin Student Events Center	French Toast, Queens of the Stone Age
September 25, 2003	Milwaukee	United States	Bradley Center	French Toast, Queens of the Stone Age
October 8, 2003	Paradise	United States	Mandalay Bay Events Center	Mike Watt, The Flaming Lips
October 9, 2003	Phoenix	United States	Cricket Pavilion	Mike Watt, The Flaming Lips
October 11, 2003	Inglewood	United States	Great Western Forum	Mike Watt, The Flaming Lips
October 12, 2003	Irvine	United States	Verizon Wireless Amphitheatre	Mike Watt, The Flaming Lips
October 14, 2003	Chula Vista	United States	Coors Amphitheatre	Mike Watt, The Flaming Lips
October 17, 2003	Oakland	United States	Network Associates Coliseum	Mike Watt, The Flaming Lips
October 18, 2003	Sacramento	United States	ARCO Arena	Mike Watt, The Flaming Lips
October 20, 2003	Portland	United States	Memorial Coliseum	Mike Watt, The Flaming Lips
October 21, 2003	Seattle	United States	KeyArena at Seattle Center	Mike Watt, The Flaming Lips
October 23, 2003	Vancouver	Canada	Pacific Coliseum	Mike Watt
October 26, 2003	Edmonton	Canada	Skyreach Centre	Mike Watt
October 27, 2003	Calgary	Canada	Pengrowth Saddledome	Mike Watt

=== Cancelled dates ===
Date	City	Country	Venue	Reason
Asia III
December 8, 2002	Pasig	Philippines	ULTRA Stadium	Terrorist attacks
December 14, 2002	Ungasan	Indonesia	Garuda Wisnu Kencana Cultural Park	Terrorist attacks

== Personnel ==
- Anthony Kiedis – lead vocals
- Flea – bass, trumpet, backing vocals, occasional lead vocals
- John Frusciante – guitar, backing vocals, occasional lead vocals
- Chad Smith – drums
