= List of members of the 4th Western Cape Provincial Parliament =

This is a list of members of the fourth Western Cape Provincial Parliament, as elected in the election of 22 April 2009 and taking into account changes in membership since the election.

Name	Party	Position
Carol Beerwinkel	ANC	Member
Tozama Bevu	COPE	Member
Theuns Botha	DA	Provincial Minister of Health
Anton Bredell	DA	Provincial Minister of Local Government, Environment Affairs and Development Planning
Lynne Brown	ANC	Leader of the Opposition
Robin Carlisle	DA	Provincial Minister of Transport and Public Works
Paulina Cupido	ACDP	Member
Patricia de Lille	ID	Provincial Minister of Social Development
Ernst Eloff	DA	Member
Shahid Esau	DA	Speaker
Albert Fritz	DA	Provincial Minister of Community Safety
Helmar Geyer	DA	Member
Donald Grant	DA	Provincial Minister of Education
Vuyiwe Hani	ANC	Member
Jennifer Hartnick	DA	Member
Phillip Jacobs	ANC	Member
Cathlene Labuschagne	DA	Member
Rodney Lentit	ID	Member
Bonginkosi Madikizela	DA	Provincial Minister of Housing
Ntombizodwa Magwaza	ANC	Member
Richard Majola	DA	Deputy Speaker
Anroux Marais	DA	Member
Buyelwa Mbalo	ANC	Member
Patrick McKenzie	ANC	Member
Ivan Meyer	DA	Provincial Minister of Cultural Affairs and Sport
Mbulelo Ncedana	COPE	Member
Max Ozinsky	ANC	Member
Ellen Prins	ANC	Member
Aletta Rossouw	DA	Member
Mcebisi Skwatsha	ANC	Member
Zandisile Stali	ANC	Member
Millicent Tingwe	ANC	Member
Pierre Uys	ANC	Member
Gerrit van Rensburg	DA	Provincial Minister of Agriculture
Joanna van Zyl	COPE	Member
Johannes Visser	DA	Member
Eugene von Brandis	DA	Member
Michael Walters	DA	Member
Mark Wiley	DA	Member
Alan Winde	DA	Provincial Minister of Finance, Economic Development and Tourism
Joselene Witbooi	ANC	Member
Helen Zille	DA	Premier of the Western Cape

== See also ==
- List of members of the 3rd Western Cape Provincial Parliament
- List of members of the 5th Western Cape Provincial Parliament
