= Live in Hyde Park (Red Hot Chili Peppers album) =

Live album by Red Hot Chili Peppers
- Released: August 3, 2004
- Recorded: June 19–20, 25, 2004
- Venue: Hyde Park, London
- Genre: Alternative rock; funk rock
- Length: 123:36
- Label: Warner Bros.
- Producer: Red Hot Chili Peppers

Red Hot Chili Peppers chronology
Greatest Hits (2003)	Live in Hyde Park (2004)	Stadium Arcadium (2006)

Professional ratings
Review scores
Source	Rating
AllMusic	4/5 stars
Rolling Stone	2.5/5 stars

Live in Hyde Park is the first live album released by the American rock band Red Hot Chili Peppers, recorded in Hyde Park, London, on June 19, 20 and 25, 2004 during the Roll on the Red Tour. These three concerts set records for the highest-grossing concerts at a single venue in history. This double album compiled from these three shows went straight to No. 1 in the UK and stayed there for two weeks, selling over 120,000 copies.

Of the eight studio albums by the Red Hot Chili Peppers that were released prior to Live in Hyde Park, only three are actually represented in this album's set list – their fifth, Blood Sugar Sex Magik, seventh, Californication, and eighth, By the Way (the single "Fortune Faded", however, was featured solely on the band's Greatest Hits compilation). "Under the Bridge" and "Give It Away" were the only songs from Blood Sugar Sex Magik. The songs "Leverage of Space" and "Rolling Sly Stone" are exclusive to this collection.

There are 4 songs that were also performed but are not included on this release, "I Like Dirt" and "My Lovely Man" were both performed on June 19, "Maybe" (The Chantels cover) on June 20 and "Mini-Epic (Kill for Your Country)" on June 25. "Mini-Epic" was originally planned for this release, but did not make it into the CD versions, probably due to delicate issues concerning the theme of the song. However, it was eventually officially released for the first time in 2015 on the Red Hot Chili Peppers' next live album, Cardiff, Wales: 6/23/04.

== Track listing ==
Disc 1

1. "Intro" – 3:57
2. "Can't Stop" – 5:13
3. "Around the World" – 4:12
4. "Scar Tissue" – 4:08
5. "By the Way" – 5:20
6. "Fortune Faded" – 3:28
7. "I Feel Love" (Donna Summer cover) – 1:28
8. "Otherside" – 4:34
9. "Easily" – 5:00
10. "Universally Speaking" – 4:16
11. "Get on Top" – 4:06
12. "Brandy" (Looking Glass cover) – 3:34
13. "Don't Forget Me" – 5:22
14. "Rolling Sly Stone" – 5:06

Disc 2

1. "Throw Away Your Television" – 7:30
2. "Leverage of Space" – 3:29
3. "Purple Stain" – 4:16
4. "The Zephyr Song" – 7:04
5. "Californication" – 5:26
6. "Right on Time" (Contains the intro of Joy Division's "Transmission") – 3:54
7. "Parallel Universe" – 5:37
8. "Drum Homage Medley" – 1:29
  - "Rock and Roll" (Led Zeppelin)
  - "Good Times Bad Times" (Led Zeppelin)
  - "Sunday Bloody Sunday" (U2)
  - "We Will Rock You" (Queen)
9. "Under the Bridge" – 4:54
10. "Black Cross" (45 Grave cover) – 3:30
11. "Flea's Trumpet Treated by John" – 3:28
12. "Give It Away" – 13:17

== Personnel ==
- Anthony Kiedis: lead vocals;
- John Frusciante: guitar and background vocals;
- Flea: bass guitar, background vocals;
- Chad Smith: drums;

== Charts ==
=== Weekly charts ===
Chart (2004)	Peak position
Australian Albums (ARIA)	5
Austrian Albums (Ö3 Austria)	1
Belgian Albums (Ultratop Flanders)	1
Belgian Albums (Ultratop Wallonia)	3
Danish Albums (Hitlisten)	15
Dutch Albums (Album Top 100)	4
Finnish Albums (Suomen virallinen lista)	13
French Albums (SNEP)	5
German Albums (Offizielle Top 100)	8
Hungarian Albums (MAHASZ)	39
Irish Albums (IRMA)	5
Italian Albums (FIMI)	3
New Zealand Albums (RMNZ)	13
Norwegian Albums (VG-lista)	19
Portuguese Albums (AFP)	11
Scottish Albums (OCC)	1
Swedish Albums (Sverigetopplistan)	22
Swiss Albums (Schweizer Hitparade)	1
UK Albums (OCC)	1

=== Year-end charts ===
Chart (2004)	Position
Austrian Albums (Ö3 Austria)	48
Belgian Albums (Ultratop Flanders)	79
Dutch Albums (Album Top 100)	100
French Albums (SNEP)	189
Italian Albums (FIMI)	73
Swiss Albums (Schweizer Hitparade)	47
UK Albums (OCC)	69

== Certifications ==
Region	Certification	Certified units/sales
Australia (ARIA)	Platinum	70,000^{^}
Austria (IFPI Austria)	Gold	15,000^{*}
Denmark (IFPI Danmark)	Gold	20,000^{^}
Italy (FIMI)	Gold	50,000^{*}
Switzerland (IFPI Switzerland)	Gold	20,000^{^}
United Kingdom (BPI)	Gold	100,000^{^}
^{*} Sales figures based on certification alone.^{^} Shipments figures based on certification alone.
