= List of members of the 3rd Western Cape Provincial Parliament =

This is a list of members of the third Western Cape Provincial Parliament, which was elected on 14 April 2004 and expired on 21 April 2009.

Name	Party	Position
Andrew Arnolds	ACDP	MPP
Carol Beerwinkel	ANC	MPP
Theuns Louis Botha	DA	Leader of the Opposition
Lynne Brown	ANC	Premier
Jakobus Johannes Brynard	ANC	MPP
Adelaide Buso	DA	MPP
Shaun Edward Byneveldt	ANC	Speaker
Robin Carlisle	DA	MPP
Pauline Cupido	ACDP	MPP
Justin de Allende	ANC	MPP
Michael Jacobus Roland de Villiers	DA	MPP
Cobus Dowry	ANC	MEC for Agriculture
Cameron Dugmore	ANC	MEC for Cultural Affairs and Sport
Petronella Duncan	DA	MPP
Richard Dyantyi	ANC	MPP
Shahid Esau	DA	MPP
Marius Fransman	ANC	MEC for Health
Yousuf Gabru	ANC	MEC for Education
Johan Gelderblom	ANC	MPP
Phillip Mziwonke Jacobs	ANC	MEC for Housing
Sipho Kroma	ANC	Government Whip
Ntombizodwa Pauline Magwaza	ANC	MEC for Social Development
Mzwandile Manjiya	UIF	MPP
Anroux Marais	DA	MPP
Lennit Max	DA	MPP
Patrick McKenzie	ANC	MEC for Community Safety
Kent Hercules Morkel	ANC	MPP
Kholeka Anita Mqulwana	ANC	MEC for Transport and Public Works
Max Ozinsky	ANC	Government Chief Whip
Sarah Unes Paulse	ID	MPP
Ellen Prince	ANC	MPP
Aletta Rossouw	DA	MPP
Zolile Moses Siswana	ANC	MPP
Mcebisi Skwatsha	ANC	Government Deputy Chief Whip
Zandisile Christopher Stali	ANC	MPP
Garth Richard Strachan	ANC	MEC for Finance, Economic Development and Tourism
Millicent Tingwe	ANC	MPP
Pierre Uys	ANC	MEC for Local Government, Environmental Affairs and Development Planning
Hendrik Gerhardus van Rensburg	DA	MPP
Mathilda Gene Vantura	ANC	MPP
Alan Winde	DA	Opposition Chief Whip
Joseline Witbooi	ANC	Deputy Speaker

== See also ==
- List of members of the 2nd Western Cape Provincial Parliament
- List of members of the 4th Western Cape Provincial Parliament
