= Gelderblom =

Gelderblom is a surname. Notable people with the surname include:

- Johan Gelderblom (fl. 1975–2014), South African politician
- Peter Gelderblom (born 1965), Dutch DJ and record producer
