= Greatest Hits (Red Hot Chili Peppers album) =

2003 greatest hits album by Red Hot Chili Peppers

Greatest hits album by Red Hot Chili Peppers
- Released: November 18, 2003
- Recorded: 1988–2003
- Genres: Funk rock; alternative rock
- Length: 66:46
- Label: Warner Bros.
- Producers: Rick Rubin; Michael Beinhorn (Greatest Hits CD); Bart Lipton; David May (Greatest Videos DVD)

Red Hot Chili Peppers chronology
By the Way (2002)	Greatest Hits (2003)	Live in Hyde Park (2004)

Singles from Greatest Hits
- 1. "Fortune Faded" Released: November 3, 2003

Professional ratings
Review scores
Source	Rating
AllMusic	4.5/5 stars
Entertainment Weekly	B+
Rolling Stone	4/5 stars
The Rolling Stone Album Guide	4/5 stars

Greatest Hits is the second greatest hits album and second compilation album by the Red Hot Chili Peppers, released on Nov. 18, 2003, by Warner Bros. Records. Aside from their cover of "Higher Ground", all songs on the album are from the band's tenure on Warner Bros. Records from 1991 to 2002, in addition to two newly recorded songs.

Greatest Hits was released along with a separately sold DVD containing most of their music videos from the same time period.

The album was released with Copy Control protection system in some European markets, but not in the United States.

== Overview ==
While their first hits compilation album What Hits!? encompasses material from their 1984 debut to 1989's Mother's Milk, this collection of songs takes off from that point, including material from their 1991 album Blood Sugar Sex Magik up through their 2002 album By the Way. It was during this period of their career that the band became a major commercial force in the music industry. Therefore, this compilation includes the majority of hit singles released since their breakthrough cover of Stevie Wonder's "Higher Ground".

"My Friends" is the only track included from the 1995 album, One Hot Minute. However, the music video for "Aeroplane" is featured on the DVD version of the compilation. "Warped", the lead single from One Hot Minute, is also absent as both a song and music video on the DVD.

Of the band's eight U.S. number-one singles on the Billboard Modern Rock Tracks chart up to that point, only one, "Can't Stop", from their 2002 album By the Way, was excluded, though the music video was featured on the DVD.

Also absent were top-10 hits "Around the World," from their 1999 album Californication and "The Zephyr Song" from By the Way although the DVD contained the music videos for the songs. Conversely, "Breaking the Girl" was not included on the DVD, as well as "Parallel Universe," the latter of which never had a music video released.

To date, Greatest Hits has outsold six of the band's 13 studio albums, including Mother's Milk and I'm with You, making it the band's fifth-highest-selling release.

== Unreleased studio album ==
In 2011, drummer Chad Smith discussed the recording sessions for Greatest Hits, mentioning that the band had recorded 16 songs and wished to release an entirely new album just for this material after a brief tour; however, guitarist John Frusciante was heavily against this idea at the time, claiming that his playing style had evolved and changed too much, as had his musical influences. Smith said there was an entire Red Hot Chili Peppers album out there that nobody would ever hear.

Aside from the two new tracks on the album ("Fortune Faded" and "Save the Population”), only two other studio tracks from these sessions have been officially released. "Bicycle Song" and "Runaway" appeared as bonus tracks on the deluxe edition of By the Way when it was released on iTunes in 2006 and can now be found on many other digital music stores. Live versions of several other songs have also been released. "Rolling Sly Stone" and "Leverage Of Space" were included on the Live in Hyde Park album in 2004 and "Mini-Epic (Kill for Your Country)" was released as an "official" bootleg in 2015. A studio in-house CD-R was leaked in 2014 which contained two instrumental tracks from these sessions, called "Starlight" and "50/Fifty", and three different takes of "Runaway". The names of the remaining songs are either unknown or unconfirmed.

On February 7, 2014, in an interview with fans on Reddit, Smith claimed that the band hoped to one day release a box set including all unreleased material from the recording sessions for Greatest Hits.

== Track listing ==
All tracks are written by Kiedis, Frusciante, Flea, Smith except where noted.

Greatest Hits track listing
No.	Title	Album	Length
1.	"Under the Bridge"	Blood Sugar Sex Magik (1991)	4:33
2.	"Give It Away"	Blood Sugar Sex Magik	4:44
3.	"Californication"	Californication (1999)	5:29
4.	"Scar Tissue"	Californication	3:35
5.	"Soul to Squeeze"	Coneheads: Music from the Motion Picture Soundtrack (1993)	4:50
6.	"Otherside"	Californication	4:15
7.	"Suck My Kiss"	Blood Sugar Sex Magik	3:35
8.	"By the Way"	By the Way (2002)	3:35
9.	"Parallel Universe"	Californication	4:29
10.	"Breaking the Girl"	Blood Sugar Sex Magik	4:54
11.	"My Friends" (Kiedis/Flea/Navarro/Smith)	One Hot Minute (1995)	4:09
12.	"Higher Ground" (Wonder)	Mother's Milk (1989)	3:22
13.	"Universally Speaking"	By the Way	4:16
14.	"Road Trippin'"	Californication	3:25
15.	"Fortune Faded"	Previously unreleased	3:21
16.	"Save the Population"	Previously unreleased	4:05
Total length:			66:37

== DVD ==
Greatest Hits and Videos

Video by Red Hot Chili Peppers
- Released: November 18, 2003
- Recorded: 1989–2003
- Genres: Alternative rock, funk rock
- Label: Warner Bros.

Red Hot Chili Peppers chronology
Off the Map (2001)	Greatest Hits and Videos (2003)	iTunes Originals – Red Hot Chili Peppers (2006)

Greatest Hits and Videos was also released with the tracks above, including a DVD (available as Greatest Videos) containing the following music videos:

Greatest Hits and Videos track listing
No.	Title	Original album	Length
1.	"Higher Ground"	Mother's Milk	3:22
2.	"Suck My Kiss"	Blood Sugar Sex Magik	3:38
3.	"Give It Away"	Blood Sugar Sex Magik	4:32
4.	"Under the Bridge"	Blood Sugar Sex Magik	4:26
5.	"Soul to Squeeze"	Coneheads soundtrack	4:51
6.	"Aeroplane"	One Hot Minute	4:09
7.	"My Friends" (studio version)	One Hot Minute	4:06
8.	"Around the World"	Californication	4:01
9.	"Scar Tissue"	Californication	3:04
10.	"Otherside"	Californication	4:18
11.	"Californication"	Californication	5:20
12.	"Road Trippin'"	Californication	3:23
13.	"By the Way"	By the Way	3:37
14.	"The Zephyr Song"	By the Way	3:50
15.	"Can't Stop"	By the Way	4:34
16.	"Universally Speaking"	By the Way	4:14
Total length:			66:46

== Charts ==
=== Weekly charts ===
2003–2004 weekly chart performance for Greatest Hits
Chart (2003–2004)	Peak position
Australian Albums (ARIA)	2
Austrian Albums (Ö3 Austria)	2
Belgian Albums (Ultratop Flanders)	1
Belgian Albums (Ultratop Wallonia)	12
Danish Albums (Hitlisten)	9
Dutch Albums (Album Top 100)	4
Finnish Albums (Suomen virallinen lista)	11
German Albums (Offizielle Top 100)	4
Hungarian Albums (MAHASZ)	40
Irish Albums (IRMA)	2
Italian Albums (FIMI)	5
Japanese Albums (Oricon)	5
New Zealand Albums (RMNZ)	2
Norwegian Albums (VG-lista)	7
Polish Albums (ZPAV)	12
Portuguese Albums (AFP)	6
Scottish Albums (Official Charts)	3
Singaporean Albums (RIAS)	10
Swedish Albums (Sverigetopplistan)	13
Swiss Albums (Schweizer Hitparade)	2
UK Albums (Official Charts)	4
US Billboard 200	18

2011 weekly chart performance for Greatest Hits
Chart (2011)	Peak position
French Albums (SNEP)	39

2016–2018 weekly chart performance for Greatest Hits
Chart (2016–2018)	Peak position
Canadian Albums (Billboard)	38
Croatian International Albums (HDU)	9
Hungarian Albums (MAHASZ)	20
US Top Rock Albums (Billboard)	13

2020 weekly chart performance for Greatest Hits
Chart (2020)	Peak position
Polish Albums (ZPAV)	3

=== Year-end charts ===
2003 year-end chart performance for Greatest Hits
Chart (2003)	Position
Australian Albums (ARIA)	25
Austrian Albums (Ö3 Austria)	62
Belgian Albums (Ultratop Flanders)	33
Dutch Albums (Album Top 100)	43
Irish Albums (IRMA)	14
Italian Albums (FIMI)	32
Swedish Albums (Sverigetopplistan)	49
Swiss Albums (Schweizer Hitparade)	53
UK Albums (OCC)	20
Worldwide Albums (IFPI)	15

2004 year-end chart performance for Greatest Hits
Chart (2004)	Position
Australian Albums (ARIA)	17
Austrian Albums (Ö3 Austria)	22
Belgian Albums (Ultratop Flanders)	64
Dutch Albums (Album Top 100)	42
German Albums (Offizielle Top 100)	49
Italian Albums (FIMI)	56
Japanese Albums (Oricon)	39
New Zealand Albums (RMNZ)	47
Swiss Albums (Schweizer Hitparade)	27
UK Albums (OCC)	58
US Billboard 200	70

2006 year-end chart performance for Greatest Hits
Chart (2006)	Position
UK Albums (OCC)	133

2013 year-end chart performance for Greatest Hits
Chart (2013)	Position
Australian Albums (ARIA)	81

2016 year-end chart performance for Greatest Hits
Chart (2016)	Position
Australian Albums (ARIA)	41
UK Albums (OCC)	80
US Billboard 200	165

2017 year-end chart performance for Greatest Hits
Chart (2017)	Position
US Billboard 200	165
US Top Rock Albums (Billboard)	28

2018 year-end chart performance for Greatest Hits
Chart (2018)	Position
Australian Albums (ARIA)	66
UK Albums (OCC)	96
US Billboard 200	169
US Top Rock Albums (Billboard)	29

2019 year-end chart performance for Greatest Hits
Chart (2019)	Position
Australian Albums (ARIA)	74
UK Albums (OCC)	88
US Billboard 200	177
US Top Rock Albums (Billboard)	28

2020 year-end chart performance for Greatest Hits
Chart (2020)	Position
UK Albums (OCC)	73
US Billboard 200	173
US Top Rock Albums (Billboard)	28

2021 year-end chart performance for Greatest Hits
Chart (2021)	Position
Australian Albums (ARIA)	86
UK Albums (OCC)	76
US Billboard 200	179
US Top Rock Albums (Billboard)	33

2022 year-end chart performance for Greatest Hits
Chart (2022)	Position
Australian Albums (ARIA)	75
UK Albums (OCC)	57

2023 year-end chart performance for Greatest Hits
Chart (2023)	Position
Australian Albums (ARIA)	60
UK Albums (OCC)	53

2024 year-end chart performance for Greatest Hits
Chart (2024)	Position
Australian Albums (ARIA)	78
UK Albums (OCC)	54

2025 year-end chart performance for Greatest Hits
Chart (2025)	Position
Australian Albums (ARIA)	91
UK Albums (OCC)	48

=== Decade-end charts ===
2000s decade-end chart performance for Greatest Hits
Chart (2000–2009)	Position
Australian Albums (ARIA)	32

2010s decade-end chart performance for Greatest Hits
Chart (2010–2019)	Position
Australian Albums (ARIA)	65

=== Legacy ===
The album has made its return to the album charts at various times over the years since its release in 2003. Twenty-two years after its release in March 2025, Greatest Hits returned to the albums charts yet again. It landed at #131 on the Billboard 200 charts giving the album its highest chart position since 2004. It also appeared at #17 on the Top Alternative Albums chart, #20 on the Top Rock Albums chart and at #26 on the Top Rock & Alternative Albums chart. In total since the album's release, it has spent a total of 315 weeks on the Billboard 200 chart, 223 weeks on the Top Rock & Alternative Albums chart, 222 weeks on the Top Rock Albums chart and 213 on the Top Alternative Albums chart.

== Certifications ==
Certifications for Greatest Hits
Region	Certification	Certified units/sales
Argentina (CAPIF)	Platinum	40,000^{^}
Australia (ARIA)	6× Platinum	420,000^{^}
Austria (IFPI Austria)	Gold	15,000^{*}
Belgium (BRMA)	Platinum	50,000^{*}
Brazil (Pro-Música Brasil)	Gold	50,000^{*}
Denmark (IFPI Danmark)	Platinum	40,000^{^}
Finland (Musiikkituottajat)	Gold	17,920
France (SNEP)	Gold	100,000^{*}
Germany (BVMI)	5× Gold	500,000^{^}
Greece (IFPI Greece)	Gold	10,000^{^}
Italy (FIMI) sales since 2009	Platinum	50,000^{‡}
Japan (RIAJ)	Platinum	250,000^{^}
Netherlands (NVPI)	Gold	40,000^{^}
New Zealand (RMNZ)	3× Platinum	45,000^{‡}
Spain (Promusicae)	Gold	50,000^{^}
Sweden (GLF)	Gold	30,000^{^}
Switzerland (IFPI Switzerland)	2× Platinum	80,000^{^}
United Kingdom (BPI)	8× Platinum	2,400,000^{‡}
United States (RIAA)	2× Platinum	2,000,000^{^}
Summaries
Europe (IFPI)	3× Platinum	3,000,000^{*}
^{*} Sales figures based on certification alone.^{^} Shipments figures based on certification alone.^{‡} Sales+streaming figures based on certification alone.
