= Universally Speaking =

2003 single by Red Hot Chili Peppers

Single by Red Hot Chili Peppers

from the album By the Way
- B-side: "Slowly Deeply"
- Released: June 16, 2003
- Genre: Alternative rock
- Length: 4:19
- Label: Warner Bros.
- Songwriters: Flea; John Frusciante; Anthony Kiedis; Chad Smith
- Producer: Rick Rubin

Red Hot Chili Peppers singles chronology
| "Dosed" (2003) | "Universally Speaking" (2003) | "Fortune Faded" (2003) |

Music video
- "Universally Speaking" on YouTube

"Universally Speaking" is a song by American rock band Red Hot Chili Peppers from their eighth studio album, By the Way (2002). It was the fourth and final single from the album and was released solely in Europe and Australia in mid-2003. The track was also included on their live album Red Hot Chili Peppers Live in Hyde Park and their Greatest Hits album.

== Song information ==
XFM online said "Universally Speaking" is a "fairly upbeat rock ode" and Rolling Stone said it was "Beatlesque psychedelia". The cover for the single is the same as the cover of the By the Way album, except the colors are reverted to normal.

== Music video ==
The video for the song features Dave Sheridan, who plays a deranged concertgoer who attempts to return a book to vocalist Anthony Kiedis, who left the book in his taxi in the video to "By the Way". After numerous failed attempts, he successfully returns the book to the frontman by going on stage while the band performs Suck My Kiss. The book he is returning to Kiedis is "Lexicon Devil: The Fast Times and Short Life of Darby Crash and the Germs", which is the biography of Darby Crash, the late frontman for the late-1970s punk band the Germs and was written by Brendan Mullen. The music video was directed by longtime friend Dick Rude who also directed the video for "Catholic School Girls Rule" and the live DVD Off the Map.

== Live performances ==
"Universally Speaking" was performed regularly on the By the Way Tour. However, it was dropped for the Stadium Arcadium Tour before making a comeback on the I'm with You World Tour. It has since been performed regularly.

== Cover version ==
In July 2021, singer-songwriter Ava Maybee, who is the daughter of drummer Chad Smith, posted a cover version of "Universally Speaking" to her Instagram page.

== Track listings ==
CD version 1

1. "Universally Speaking" (John Frusciante single mix) – 4:18
2. "By the Way" (live acoustic) – 4:59
3. "Don't Forget Me" (live) – 5:07

CD version 2

1. "Universally Speaking" (John Frusciante single mix) – 4:20
2. "Slowly Deeply" (previously unreleased) – 2:40
3. "Universally Speaking" (enhanced video)

== Charts ==
=== Weekly charts ===
2003 weekly chart performance for "Universally Speaking"
| Chart (2003) | Peak position |
|---|---|
| Australia (ARIA) | 80 |
| Croatia International Airplay (Top lista) | 6 |
| Europe (Eurochart Hot 100) | 89 |
| Ireland (IRMA) | 42 |
| Italy (FIMI) | 43 |
| Scotland Singles (Official Charts) | 23 |
| UK Singles (Official Charts) | 27 |
| UK Rock & Metal (Official Charts) | 5 |

=== Monthly charts ===
2025 monthly chart performance for "Universally Speaking"
| Chart (2025) | Peak position |
|---|---|
| Russia Streaming (TopHit) | 94 |

== Release history ==
Release history and formats for "Universally Speaking"
| Region | Date | Format(s) | Label(s) | Ref(s). |
|---|---|---|---|---|
| United Kingdom | June 16, 2003 | CD | Warner Bros. | |
| Australia | July 7, 2003 | CD | Warner Bros. | |
