= Eugene von Brandis =

South African politician and colonel (1954-2015)

Permanent delegate to the National Council of Provinces from the Western Cape
- In office 22 May 2014 – 27 May 2015

Member of the Western Cape Provincial Parliament
- In office 6 May 2009 – 6 May 2014

Personal details
- Born: Eugene Jeffrey Von Brandis; 1954 Johannesburg, South Africa
- Died: 27 May 2015 (aged 61)
- Party: Democratic Alliance
- Spouse: Ina (until 2015; his death)
- Children: 3
- Profession: Politician

Eugene Jeffrey von Brandis (1954 – 27 May 2015) was a South African politician and retired army officer. A member of the Democratic Alliance, he served as the speaker of the George Local Municipality from 2007 to 2009, when he was elected to the Western Cape Provincial Parliament. After serving one term in the provincial parliament, he was elected to the National Council of Provinces after the 2014 general election. He served in the NCOP until his death in May 2015.

== Early life and career ==
Von Brandis was born in Johannesburg in 1954. He matriculated from Bergsig High School in Rustenburg in 1971. His father worked as a medical doctor, while his mother was employed by a bank. Von Brandis was the eldest of five children. After he completed his two-year military service, his family moved to Hoekwil just outside George. Von Brandis bought George Natural Remedies and ran the business for two years. He sold the business in 1977 when he joined the army as a permanent force member in Pretoria. In 1996, he retired from the army as a colonel. He then started a business with his wife in George.

== Political career ==
Von Brandis took an interest in politics and joined the New National Party. In 2000, he was elected as a Democratic Alliance councillor in the newly established George Local Municipality. He was re-elected as a councillor in 2006. In 2007, Von Brandis was elected speaker of the municipality, a position he held until his election to the Western Cape Provincial Parliament in the 2009 general election. He was then elected chairperson of the budget committee and the standing committee on finance, economic development, tourism, transport, and public works. During his time in the provincial parliament, he was also the DA's constituency head for Swellendam and Theewaterskloof.

After the 2014 South African general election, the DA's Gerrit van Rensburg declined to take up his seat in the National Council of Provinces. The DA then nominated Von Brandis to replace him and the Western Cape provincial parliament confirmed his nomination. He was sworn in on 22 May 2014 along with all the other newly elected NCOP delegates. Von Brandis served alongside fellow DA Western Cape NCOP delegate Jaco Londt, who was also from George. In June 2014, he became a member of the NCOP Select Committee on Appropriations.

== Personal life and death ==
Von Brandis married Ina Barnard at the NG Church George South. They had three children.

Von Brandis died from cancer on 27 May 2015 after a long illness. His remains were cremated and buried in George. His daughter, Jacqulique von Brandis, was elected as the DA councillor for ward 26 in George in 2016.
