= Dosed =

Song by Red Hot Chili Peppers

Promotional single by Red Hot Chili Peppers

from the album By the Way
- Released: May 19, 2003
- Genre: Alternative rock
- Length: 5:11 (album version); 4:35 (single edit)
- Label: Warner Bros.
- Songwriters: Flea; John Frusciante; Anthony Kiedis; Chad Smith
- Producer: Rick Rubin

Red Hot Chili Peppers singles chronology
"Can't Stop" (2003)	"Dosed" (2003)	"Universally Speaking" (2003)

"Dosed" is a song by the Red Hot Chili Peppers from their 2002 album, By the Way. It was released as a radio single in the United States and Canada only. It peaked at number 13 on the U.S. Modern Rock Tracks chart in 2003.

== Background ==
The song features four guitars, played by John Frusciante and Flea, all playing completely different riffs. The chorus is sung by John Frusciante and Anthony Kiedis harmonising. A ballad that clocks in at 5:11, it is the third-longest track on the album. It runs through stages, each time repeating the original verse until the song's completion. In between the verses, guitar solos can be heard from the four guitars that play.

== Live performances ==
"Dosed" was never performed live with John Frusciante, but teased by Frusciante in Copenhagen, Denmark, in 2006, and by Josh Klinghoffer in Athens, Greece and Istanbul, Turkey in 2012, and in Rio de Janeiro and São Paulo in 2013. On May 28, 2017 in Edmonton, "Dosed" was performed for the first time in its entirety during the band's The Getaway World Tour with opening act IRONTOM's Zach Irons, son of founding Chili Peppers' drummer Jack Irons, providing a second guitar to the song to honor a 17-year-old terminally ill fan, Maggie Schmidt.

== Personnel ==
Red Hot Chili Peppers

- Anthony Kiedis - lead vocals
- John Frusciante - guitar, vocals, electric piano
- Flea - bass, additional guitar
- Chad Smith - drums

== Charts ==
Chart (2003)	Peak position
US Alternative Airplay (Billboard)	13
