= List of members of the 2nd Western Cape Provincial Parliament =

This is a list of members of the second Western Cape Provincial Parliament, which was elected on 2 June 1999 and expired on 14 April 2004.

| Name | Party | Position |
|---|---|---|
| Alan Winde | DA | Western Cape Provincial Finance Chairman and Member of the Executive Committee |
| Marius Fransman | ANC | Provincial Minister of Social Services and Poverty Alleviation |
| Lynne Brown | ANC | |
| Cameron Dugmore | ANC | |
| Gerald Morkel | NNP | |

== See also ==
- List of members of the 3rd Western Cape Provincial Parliament
