= Rodney Lentit =

South African politician

Member of the Western Cape Provincial Parliament
- In office December 2010 – 27 February 2017

Personal details
- Born: Rodney Benjamin Lentit Elsie's River, Cape Province, South Africa
- Party: Good
- Other political affiliations: Democratic Alliance; Independent Democrats.
- Profession: Politician

Rodney Benjamin Lentit is a South African politician who served as a Member of the Western Cape Provincial Parliament from December 2010 to February 2017.

== Life and career ==
Lentit is from Elsie's River in Cape Town. He joined the Independent Democrats in 2003 and served as the party's provincial secretary.

In October 2010, the ID announced its merger with the Democratic Alliance. Lentit was consequently given daul party membership. In December, he was sworn in as a Member of the Western Cape Provincial Parliament for the ID. He filled Sakkie Jenner's seat, who had resigned citing personal reasons.

After the 2014 general election, he officially became a member of the DA and remained a member of the provincial parliament. The DA caucus elected him chairperson.

On 27 February 2017, Lentit resigned from the provincial parliament. Earlier that month, Patricia de Lille, the former ID leader, resigned as provincial leader of the DA.

De Lille left the DA in October 2018 and formed Good in December. Lentit joined the party and was placed 6th on the party's provincial list for the 2019 general election. He was not elected, as the party only won one seat in the provincial parliament.
