= By the Way =

Studio album by Red Hot Chili Peppers
- Released: July 9, 2002
- Recorded: November 2001 – May 2002
- Studios: Cello and Chateau Marmont, Los Angeles, California
- Genres: Alternative rock; funk rock; pop rock
- Length: 68:27
- Label: Warner Bros.
- Producer: Rick Rubin

Red Hot Chili Peppers chronology
Californication (1999)	By the Way (2002)	Greatest Hits (2003)

Singles from By the Way
- 1. "By the Way" Released: June 24, 2002; 2. "The Zephyr Song" Released: August 17, 2002; 3. "Can't Stop" Released: February 3, 2003; 4. "Universally Speaking" Released: June 17, 2003

By the Way is the eighth studio album by the American rock band Red Hot Chili Peppers, released July 9, 2002, on Warner Bros. Records. It sold more than 286,000 copies in its first week, and peaked at number two on the Billboard 200. Singles included "By the Way", "The Zephyr Song", "Can't Stop" and "Universally Speaking". Additionally, "Dosed" was released as a promotional single in the US and Canada. The lyrical subject matter vocalist Anthony Kiedis addresses in By the Way is a divergence from previous Red Hot Chili Peppers albums, with Kiedis taking a more candid and reflective approach to his lyrics.

By the Way was lauded by critics as a departure from the band's previous styles, and is recognized for the melodic and subdued emotions given by the Chili Peppers. Guitarist John Frusciante is credited with writing most of the album's melodies, backing vocal arrangements, bass lines, and guitar progressions, therefore changing the direction of the recording dramatically: "his warm, understated guitar work and his doo-wop style vocal harmonies are king this time around." By the Way contained very little of the signature funk-rock fusion the band had become known for playing. Frusciante has stated that writing "By the Way [was] one of the happiest times in my life." The album went on to sell more than eight million copies worldwide. The album has come to be regarded by many as one of the band's finest works.

== Background ==
The writing and formation of By the Way began immediately following the culmination of Californication's world tour, in the spring of 2001. As with Californication, much of the creation took place in the band members' homes and other practice locations, such as a recording studio stage. Kiedis recalled of the situation: "We started finding some magic and some music and some riffs and some rhythms and some jams and some grooves, and we added to it and subtracted from it and pushed it around and put melodies to it." Frusciante and Kiedis would collaborate for days straight, discussing guitar progressions and sharing lyrics. For Kiedis, "writing By the Way ... was a whole different experience from Californication. John was back to himself and brimming with confidence." Prior to recording By the Way, the Red Hot Chili Peppers decided that they would again have Rick Rubin produce the album. Rubin had, in the past, granted the band creative freedom on their recording material; this was something they thought essential for the album to be unique, and could only occur with his return.

== Writing and composition ==
According to the 2010 book, An Oral/Visual History by the Red Hot Chili Peppers, Frusciante had originally intended for the album to be very different from how it was eventually completed. He wanted an album of two different types of songs: songs that were more "English-sounding" and melodic, and songs that were more influenced by punk rock. Frusciante's punk inspiration came from listening to music by the Damned and Discharge, among others. Rick Rubin was not familiar with the latter bands and sound and thought that the melodic songs were original and more exciting, causing the band to focus mostly on the melodic material. However, one punk rock-influenced song was recorded during these sessions, "Body of Water", but did not make the final cut and was instead included on "The Zephyr Song" single. Many of the more melodic inspired songs came from Frusciante listening to the Beach Boys and the Beatles, along with doo-wop groups and their harmonies. He listened to Emerson, Lake & Palmer every day during the recording of By the Way. Frusciante also drew inspiration from synth-pop artists, using his guitar to emulate the melodies of Kraftwerk, the Human League, Gary Numan, Orchestral Manoeuvres in the Dark, and Depeche Mode. He explained to LA Weekly, "I was finding that people who were programming synthesizers in this early electronic music were playing in a very minimal way, where every single note means something new and every note builds on what the last notes were doing."

These new styles as well as Frusciante being especially prolific during this era came to alienate bassist Flea, who had wanted the band to return to its earlier funk-influenced sound. Frusciante felt the band had already thoroughly explored funk and was more interested in creating something new for the band. According to Kiedis, Flea felt his voice was not being heard, and there was a point where he considered leaving the band. While speaking to Swedish newspaper Aftonbladet, Frusciante mentioned that he listened to guitarists such as John McGeoch for his work on the Magazine's and Siouxsie and the Banshees' albums including Juju, Adrian Fisher of Sparks for Kimono My House, Johnny Marr of the Smiths, Vini Reilly of the Durutti Column and Keith Levene of Public Image Limited. He also credits XTC singer/guitarist Andy Partridge in the 2002 issue of Total Guitar for being an influence on his guitar work for the album.

The album's guitar and bass ensemble was primarily dictated by Frusciante, rather than a collaborative effort between him and Flea. Therefore, the record took a different direction than any previous Chili Peppers' album. Frusciante sought to create an emotional and poignant soundscape throughout the recording. Drawing influences from musicians such as Reilly and McGeoch, Frusciante made use of textured and multilayered guitar progressions on By the Way, using tools such as the mellotron and various effects pedals throughout. In 2006, while promoting the band's subsequent studio album, Stadium Arcadium, Flea reflected on the composition of By the Way, stating: "John went to this whole level of artistry. But he made me feel like I had nothing to offer, like I knew shit."

"Can't Stop"
Sample of "Can't Stop", the third single from the album, which combined rapidly sung verses and textured, multi-layered guitar riffs. Frusciante sings backing vocals throughout.

Kiedis was lyrically influenced by love, his girlfriend, and the emotions expressed when one fell in love. Songs written for the album such as "By the Way", "I Could Die for You", "Dosed", "Warm Tape" and non-album tracks "Someone" and "Body of Water" all digressed into the many sides of love. Drugs also played an integral part in Kiedis' writings, as he had only been sober since December 2000. Tracks like "This Is the Place" and "Don't Forget Me" expressed his intense relationship with narcotics, the harmful physical and emotional effects they caused him, and the ever-present danger of relapse (as Kiedis has suffered chronic relapse into drug addiction). He referenced the late Red Hot Chili Peppers guitarist Hillel Slovak, who died of a heroin overdose in 1988, in "This Is the Place", and describes how he was so intoxicated at the time that he missed Slovak's funeral: "On the day my best friend died/I could not get my copper clean." "Venice Queen" was written as an ode to Kiedis' drug rehabilitation therapist, Gloria Scott, who died shortly after he purchased her a home on California's Venice Beach. It mourned her death as a painful loss: "We all want to tell her/Tell her that we love her/Venice gets a queen/Best I've ever seen."

By the Way diverged from the band's previous styles, containing a few funk-driven songs. "Can't Stop" and the title track were the only songs that revisited their once trademark style of short, rapped verses. "Throw Away Your Television", while not having any rapidly sung lyrics, also contained a funk-oriented bass line, though hinted at experimental rock due to the heavy use of distortion throughout the verse and chorus. Other "experimental" tracks include the melodica-based "On Mercury". "Cabron", the only track to be played mostly acoustic, has distinctive Latin influences. Frusciante has stated that the guitar parts for "Cabron" were influenced by Martin Barre's playing on Jethro Tull's album Aqualung, with Anthony and Chad's parts contributing to the Latin, or Mexican, influence. "Tear" and "Warm Tape" were keyboard based more so than guitar or bass, the latter being completely written on the instrument. Technically, By the Way saw the Red Hot Chili Peppers employing several devices to distort and alter guitar and vocal sequences. "Don't Forget Me" utilizes a mellotron, wah pedal, and echoing techniques to convey an emotive atmosphere, while Frusciante uses a Big Muff for the solos on "Minor Thing".

=== Outtakes ===
Many outtakes from the album have been released or exist. "Time" and a cover version of Dion and the Belmonts' "Teenager in Love" were released on the single "By the Way". "Body of Water", "Out of Range", "Someone" and "Rivers of Avalon" were all released on the single "The Zephyr Song". "Slowly Deeply", which was featured on the single "Universally Speaking", is an outtake from the Californication sessions. The single for "Can't Stop" also features an alternate mix of the song with higher harmonies and a clearer bass line. A cover version of the Ramones' "Havana Affair" was also recorded and later released in 2003 on We're a Happy Family: A Tribute to Ramones. In 2003, the band re-entered the studio to work on their Greatest Hits album. "Fortune Faded", a song first performed live in 2001, was originally recorded and intended for By the Way; however, this version of the song was never officially released. The song was re-recorded with a different chorus and was released as a single to promote the Greatest Hits album and featured the B-side, "Eskimo", another By the Way outtake. The Greatest Hits sessions also produced enough songs for a new album, many of which have gone unreleased though some of the rough mixes have leaked to the internet. "Bicycle Song" and "Runaway" were officially released from those sessions in 2006 as bonus tracks on the iTunes release of By the Way even though neither song was originally recorded for the album.

In August 2014, unreleased tracks from the album's recording sessions were leaked to the Internet. Many of the album's released songs and outtakes are in their earliest forms and feature improvised lyrics by Kiedis. The leak included three songs never heard before, including "Goldmine", "Fall Water" and "Rock & Roll", along with the original version of "Fortune Faded". Many of the songs on By the Way also had different working titles (which prior to release were also mentioned in various interviews): Soul Train ("By the Way"), Coltraine ("The Zephyr Song"), Choppy Funk ("Can't Stop"), I Would Die, The Most Beautiful Chords Ever ("I Could Die For You"), Wolverine, Drone ("This is the Place"), A Minor One ("Minor Thing"), Television, Trash Your Television and Throw Away ("Throw Away Your Television"), Don't Forget ("Don't Forget Me"), Lemon Trees on Mercury ("On Mercury"), The Loop Song ("Dosed"), Epic, Gloria's Epic ("Venice Queen") and New Wave ("Rivers Of Avalon"). To date, "Strumming in D on J", a song assumed to be an instrumental jam and that Frusciante mentioned during pre-album release interviews, has never been released. "Upseen", another instrumental jam which was said to be ten minutes long, has also never been released; it is speculated that this song could also have been another title for "Strumming in D on J".

By the Way outtakes
Title	Source
"Time"	"By the Way" CD1
"A Teenager in Love"	"By the Way" CD1
"Body of Water"	"The Zephyr Song" CD1
"Someone"	"The Zephyr Song" CD1
"Out of Range"	"The Zephyr Song" CD2
"Rivers of Avalon"	"The Zephyr Song" CD2
"Eskimo"	"Fortune Faded" CD1

== Artwork ==
All paintings, photography and art direction are credited to Julian Schnabel and the Red Hot Chili Peppers. The woman featured on the cover of By the Way is Stella Schnabel, Julian Schnabel's daughter and Frusciante's then-girlfriend. Regarding the artwork, Frusciante noted: "My girlfriend's father offered to do the album art, so we sent him rough mixes of eight songs, and he just got the vibe of the album from that. He said that he wouldn't be offended if we didn't like it, but we loved what he did. He's also given us great covers for all the singles. He's a true artist."

Several pages of the album's booklet, and the single for "By the Way", contain paintings of a goat head. A somewhat blurry black and white photograph of the band in a desolate field, and each band member individually, is also present.

The majority of the booklet's artwork are various scenes of replica grass and plants, stars, and indistinguishable objects placed in dirt. Single covers for "The Zephyr Song" and "Can't Stop" both feature this same background, although angled slightly differently. The lyrics for By the Way are placed on top of the landscape, handwritten by Kiedis in pink lettering.

== Release ==
Feeling extremely confident in the album, the Red Hot Chili Peppers issued the statement, "Greetings from the dimensions of invisible shapes and colors. The music on this record has expanded our space and made us bigger. Thank you for listening and being exactly where and who you are." Drummer Chad Smith commented that By the Way is "very honest, raw, emotional music. It's a very dynamic, rich and lush album. Probably the best collection of Chili Peppers songs we've ever put out." Warner Bros. Records promoted the album heavily in the months prior to the record's 2002 release, especially targeting the online market in order to steer customers away from illegal downloads. The record label implemented a campaign they colloquially titled "A Song a Day". This program, initiated on June 21, was aimed at leaking one song per day until the album was released. Over 150 radio stations participated in broadcasting the band's new daily material, along with MTV, VH1, and digital music retailers like iTunes, as well as cell phone companies. AOL featured the Chili Peppers as their "Artist of the Month" in June, streaming interviews and live performances of the band free of charge; they also sold an MP3 of "By the Way", the record's first single, for ninety-nine cents and raffled off tickets that gave fans a chance to see the band in Japan in November.

By the Way was released on CD and LP on July 9, 2002, under the Warner Bros. label, selling 281,948 copies in the United States in its first week and 1.8 million worldwide. It was certified gold just a few months later on October 26, 2002. Five singles were released from the album; of these, the title track was the most successful, peaking at No. 2 on the UK charts and No. 1 on the Billboard rock charts. Although the album sold fewer copies than Californication, By the Way managed to peak at No. 2 on the Billboard 200, one spot higher than Californication. Around the world, the album debuted at number one in the UK, Switzerland, New Zealand, Austria, and Sweden; and number two in France. In March 2006, all Red Hot Chili Peppers' albums were made available for download from the iTunes Music Store and other online retailers. The iTunes release contained two bonus tracks that did not appear on the original album.

== Critical reception ==
Professional ratings
Aggregate scores
Source	Rating
Metacritic	70/100
Review scores
Source	Rating
AllMusic	4.5/5 stars
Blender	3/5 stars
Entertainment Weekly	B
The Guardian	4/5 stars
Los Angeles Times	3/4 stars
NME	3.5/5 stars
Q	5/5 stars
Rolling Stone	4/5 stars
USA Today	3/4 stars
The Village Voice	B−

The album received a positive reaction from critics, who praised By the Way for its melodic, multilayer and textured styles. AllMusic's Zac Johnson said that the album was "sophisticated ... the Peppers have not sacrificed any of their trademark energy or passions for life, universal love, and (of course) lust". Rolling Stone called the album "insanely melodic" and a "near-perfect balance of gutter grime and high-art aspiration", comparing it to other works, such as the Beach Boys' album Pet Sounds. Mojo applauded the recording, and considered it to be "the strongest Chili's album since 1991's Blood Sugar Sex Magik". Giving the album 5 stars out of 5, Q called By the Way "A fantastic record; full of wonder." Kimberly Mack of PopMatters commented on how the album "... showcases a more sophisticated, lush sound that only today's Peppers could have conceived", and that "Anthony Kiedis' lyrics are more personal than ever." Frusciante was, in her eyes, "a musical talent to be reckoned with and is the undeniable X factor in the Red Hot Chili Peppers' sound."

However, the praise was balanced by certain critics. Blender considered By the Way to be an indistinguishable sequel to Californication, calling it "Californication 2". It further criticized the Chili Peppers for not varying their style and remaining extremely similar in sound. Jaime Lowe of The Village Voice panned Kiedis' lyrics as "absolutely baffling" and commented that "it's as if he picked up a rhyming dictionary and arbitrarily strung some phrases together." The newspaper's Robert Christgau was also critical of Kiedis' songwriting, writing that "it's not enough for Anthony Kiedis to get all mature—he's supposed to say something interesting about maturity." Entertainment Weekly praised By the Way for being well refined and a superb collaboration, but criticized the Chili Peppers for playing it safe and keeping the album's energy mild; for being "more fascinating for what it symbolizes than what it is."

AllMusic considered the song "By the Way" to combine "fiery Hollywood funk, gentle harmonies, a little bit of singing about girls, [and] a little bit of hanging out in the streets in the summertime." Rolling Stone commented on "how close this band has come to conjuring pure California sunshine" in "The Zephyr Song". "Midnight" was highly regarded by several sources. It was chosen as one of By the Way's "Allmusic Track Picks". Kimberly Mack of PopMatters considered it to have "hippie-friendly lyrics" and to "evoke images of tie-dyed T-shirts and AM radio." Mack also regarded "Venice Queen" as "a masterpiece ... Frusciante's backing vocals are hauntingly beautiful." In 2005, By the Way was ranked number 375 in Rock Hard magazine's book The 500 Greatest Rock & Metal Albums of All Time. It has been cited as one of the band's best works.

=== Accolades ===
Accolades for By the Way
Publication	Country	Accolade	Year	Rank
Q magazine	United Kingdom	Top 20 Albums from the Lifetime of Q (1986–2006)	2006	16
Q magazine	United Kingdom	The Ultimate Music Collection	2005	*
Rolling Stone	Germany	The 100 Best Albums Since Autumn 1994	2003	71
Rolling Stone	Germany	The 500 Greatest Albums of All Time	2004	304
Consequence of Sound	United States	Top 100 Albums of the 2000s	2009	63
* denotes an unranked list

== Tour ==
Red Hot Chili Peppers performing "By the Way" at Slane Castle on August 23, 2003

Flea decided that he would finish the album and then quit the band. He was still upset over disputes with Frusciante, who he thought was trying to take over the band. According to Smith, Flea and Frusciante eventually had a sit-down meeting with each other to air out their differences. Frusciante had no idea how Flea was feeling and had no intentions of taking over. Flea also credited practicing Vipassanā meditation along with Frusciante for helping the two repair their musical relationship. With their problems worked out, the band launched their promo tour to support the album on New York City's Ellis Island. Sponsored by the rock radio station K-Rock, the event was titled the "Pep Rally". The band performed eight songs from By the Way, as well as tracks from Californication and Blood Sugar Sex Magik in front of 900 contest winners. The New York Post declared the show "one of the top concerts of the year." The location was chosen in order to reinvigorate lower Manhattan after the September 11 attacks and all proceeds were donated to pertinent charity organizations. Immediately following this, the Red Hot Chili Peppers embarked on a world tour to support the album. Beginning in Europe, they also played at events such as the Fuji Rock Festival and Coachella Valley Music and Arts Festival in between. The band eventually culminated their Europe leg of the tour in February 2003, and commenced the United States leg on May 1. The Red Hot Chili Peppers played at Madison Square Garden in New York City on May 20, 2003, to a sold-out crowd and an enthusiastic response from critics. Kelefa Sanneh of The New York Times reported that "on Tuesday night, the [Red Hot Chili Peppers] came to Madison Square Garden for an extraordinary two-hour performance ... On 'Don't Forget Me', [Flea] strummed chords, while Mr. Frusciante contributed a gorgeous guitar line that bubbled and hissed like some sort of chemical reaction." The US leg ended on June 21; the band took a small hiatus before performing at Slane Castle in Ireland on August 23, to a crowd of over 80,000. Live at Slane Castle, the result of the concert, would become the Chili Peppers' second live DVD, after Off the Map.

Following several Japanese and Australian performances, the Red Hot Chili Peppers planned three nights at London's Hyde Park. Over 240,000 tickets were sold within hours, with roughly 80,000 people attending each show on June 19, 20, and 25, respectively. It became the highest-grossing concert at a single venue in history, accumulating an estimated $17 million gross revenue. Due to the success of the three shows, the band released their first live album, Red Hot Chili Peppers Live in Hyde Park, in Europe, Australia, Japan and New Zealand, excluding the United States. Later that year, the band played for the 2004 Democratic National Convention.

In 2006, Flea revealed that he once again considered leaving the band while touring in support of the album, stating that "throughout the By the Way tour I would play a show and then go and sit on the end of my bed staring into space." He planned to teach full-time at the Silverlake Conservatory of Music, but ultimately decided to remain with the band. Flea later stated that "the most painful part of quitting, and the thing that stopped me, was the idea of telling Anthony."

== Track listing ==
All tracks are written by Red Hot Chili Peppers.

By the Way track listing
No.	Title	Length
1.	"By the Way"	3:37
2.	"Universally Speaking"	4:18
3.	"This Is the Place"	4:16
4.	"Dosed"	5:11
5.	"Don't Forget Me"	4:36
6.	"The Zephyr Song"	3:52
7.	"Can't Stop"	4:28
8.	"I Could Die for You"	3:13
9.	"Midnight"	4:54
10.	"Throw Away Your Television"	3:43
11.	"Cabron"	3:37
12.	"Tear"	5:16
13.	"On Mercury"	3:28
14.	"Minor Thing"	3:37
15.	"Warm Tape"	4:15
16.	"Venice Queen"	6:06
Total length:		68:27

Japanese CD bonus track
No.	Title	Length
17.	"Time"	3:47
Total length:		72:14

2006 iTunes bonus tracks
No.	Title	Length
17.	"Runaway"	4:40
18.	"Bicycle Song"	3:23
Total length:		76:30

== Personnel ==
Credits adapted from AllMusic.

Red Hot Chili Peppers

- Anthony Kiedis – lead vocals
- John Frusciante – guitar, backing vocals, piano, keyboards, modular synthesizer, Mellotron
- Flea – bass, guitar on "Dosed", trumpet on "Tear", melodica on "On Mercury"
- Chad Smith – drums, percussion, tambourine

Production

- Lindsay Chase – production coordination
- David Campbell – string arrangement
- Suzie Katayama – contractor and cello
- Joel Derouin – concertmaster
- Evan Wilson – viola
- Larry Corbett – cello
- Charlie Bisharat, Gerry Hilera, Peter Kent – violins
- Matt Funes – viola
- Ryan Hewitt – engineer
- Marc Mann – arranger
- Ethan Mates – recording engineer
- Vlado Meller – mastering
- Rick Rubin – production and engineering
- Jim Scott – mix engineer, recording engineer
- Jason Wormer – recording engineer

Design

- Julian Schnabel – art direction
- Red Hot Chili Peppers – art direction

== Charts ==
=== Weekly charts ===
Weekly chart performance for By the Way
Charts (2002)	Peak position
Argentine Albums (CAPIF)	2
Australian Albums (ARIA)	1
Austrian Albums (Ö3 Austria)	1
Belgian Albums (Ultratop Flanders)	1
Belgian Albums (Ultratop Wallonia)	2
Canadian Albums (Billboard)	1
Danish Albums (Hitlisten)	1
Dutch Albums (Album Top 100)	1
European Albums (Billboard)	1
Finnish Albums (Suomen virallinen lista)	1
French Albums (SNEP)	2
German Albums (Offizielle Top 100)	1
Greek Albums (IFPI)	1
Hungarian Albums (MAHASZ)	2
Irish Albums (IRMA)	1
Italian Albums (FIMI)	1
Japanese Albums (Oricon)	4
New Zealand Albums (RMNZ)	1
Norwegian Albums (VG-lista)	1
Polish Albums (ZPAV)	1
Portuguese Albums (AFP)	2
Scottish Albums (Official Charts)	1
Spanish Albums (AFYVE)	2
Swedish Albums (Sverigetopplistan)	1
Swiss Albums (Schweizer Hitparade)	1
UK Albums (Official Charts)	1
UK Rock & Metal Albums (Official Charts)	1
US Billboard 200	2

Chart (2026)	Peak position
Portuguese Streaming Albums (AFP)	172

=== Year-end charts ===
2002 year-end chart performance for By the Way
Chart (2002)	Position
Australian Albums (ARIA)	6
Austrian Albums (Ö3 Austria)	6
Belgian Albums (Ultratop Flanders)	9
Belgian Alternative Albums (Ultratop Flanders)	3
Belgian Albums (Ultratop Wallonia)	22
Canadian Albums (Nielsen SoundScan)	33
Canadian Alternative Albums (Nielsen SoundScan)	8
Canadian Metal Albums (Nielsen SoundScan)	5
Danish Albums (Hitlisten)	23
Dutch Albums (Album Top 100)	12
European Albums (Music & Media)	8
Finnish Albums (Suomen viralinen lista)	10
French Albums (SNEP)	34
German Albums (Offizielle Top 100)	8
Irish Albums (IRMA)	4
Italian Albums (FIMI)	7
Japanese Albums (Oricon)	86
New Zealand Albums (RMNZ)	15
Spanish International Albums (AFYPE)	8
Swedish Albums (Sverigetopplistan)	12
Swedish Albums & Compilations (Sverigetopplistan)	15
Swiss Albums (Schweizer Hitparade)	6
UK Albums (OCC)	6
US Billboard 200	59
Worldwide Albums (IFPI)	10

2003 year-end chart performance for By the Way
Chart (2003)	Position
Australian Albums (ARIA)	21
Belgian Albums (Ultratop Flanders)	100
Belgian Alternative Albums (Ultratop Flanders)	39
French Albums (SNEP)	125
German Albums (Offizielle Top 100)	58
Irish Albums (IRMA)	19
UK Albums (OCC)	18
US Billboard 200	89

2004 year-end chart performance for By the Way
Chart (2004)	Position
UK Albums (OCC)	197

=== Decade-end charts ===
Decade-end chart performance for By the Way
Chart (2000–09)	Position
Australian Albums (ARIA)	53
UK Albums (OCC)	28

== Certifications ==
Certifications for By the Way
Region	Certification	Certified units/sales
Argentina (CAPIF)	Platinum	40,000^{^}
Australia (ARIA)	5× Platinum	350,000^{^}
Austria (IFPI Austria)	Platinum	30,000^{*}
Belgium (BRMA)	Gold	25,000^{*}
Brazil (Pro-Música Brasil)	2× Platinum	250,000^{*}
Canada (Music Canada)	2× Platinum	200,000^{^}
Croatia (HDU)	Gold	
Denmark (IFPI Danmark)	3× Platinum	60,000^{‡}
Finland (Musiikkituottajat)	Platinum	30,000
France (SNEP)	Platinum	300,000^{*}
Germany (BVMI)	3× Gold	450,000^{^}
Greece (IFPI Greece)	Platinum	30,000^{^}
Hungary (MAHASZ)	Gold	10,000^{^}
Italy (FIMI) sales since 2009	Platinum	50,000^{‡}
Japan (RIAJ)	2× Platinum	400,000^{^}
Netherlands (NVPI)	Platinum	80,000^{^}
New Zealand (RMNZ)	2× Platinum	30,000^{^}
Norway	—	49,000
Poland (ZPAV)	Gold	35,000^{*}
South Korea	—	12,868
Spain (Promusicae)	Platinum	100,000^{^}
Sweden (GLF)	Platinum	60,000^{^}
Switzerland (IFPI Switzerland)	2× Platinum	80,000^{^}
United Kingdom (BPI)	7× Platinum	2,100,000^{‡}
United States (RIAA)	2× Platinum	2,000,000^{^}
Summaries
Europe (IFPI)	3× Platinum	3,000,000^{*}
^{*} Sales figures based on certification alone.^{^} Shipments figures based on certification alone.^{‡} Sales+streaming figures based on certification alone.
