= Cobus Dowry =

South African politician, farmer and newsreader (1946–2014)

Western Cape Provincial Minister for Agriculture
- In office April 2004 – April 2009
- Premier: Ebrahim Rasool; Lynne Brown
- Preceded by: Johan Gelderblom
- Succeeded by: Gerrit van Rensburg

Member of the Western Cape Provincial Parliament
- In office June 2002 – April 2009

Member of the National Assembly
- In office May 1994 – June 2002

Personal details
- Born: 7 December 1946
- Died: 5 May 2014 (aged 67)
- Citizenship: South Africa
- Party: African National Congress (from 2005); New National Party (1997–2005); National Party (until 1997)

Jacobus Johannes "Cobus" Dowry (7 December 1946 – 5 May 2014) was a South African politician who served in the Western Cape Executive Council from 2002 to 2009. He served in the National Assembly from 1994 to 2002 and in the Western Cape Provincial Parliament from 2002 to 2009. He represented the National Party (NP) and New National Party (NNP) until September 2005, when he crossed the floor to the African National Congress (ANC). He was an SABC newsreader before entering politics and he was involved in commercial farming after he retired from politics in 2009.

== Early life and career ==
Dowry was born on 7 December 1946 and was classified as Coloured under apartheid. He had a master's degree and was formerly a newsreader for the SABC.

== Legislative career: 1994–2009 ==
In the 1994 general election, he was elected to an NP seat in the National Assembly. In the next general election in 1999, he was re-elected his seat under the banner of the relaunched NNP. However, he left during the legislative term to join the Western Cape Provincial Parliament in June 2002, swopping seats with provincial legislator Willem Doman. Newly elected Premier Marthinus van Schalkwyk appointed him to succeed Doman in the Western Cape Executive Council as Provincial Minister for Local Government.

In the 2004 general election, Dowry was re-elected to the provincial parliament and was retained in the Executive Council by van Schalkwyk's successor, Ebrahim Rasool, who named him as Provincial Minister for Agriculture. In August of the following year, he announced that he would cross the floor to the ANC during September's floor-crossing window. He remained in the agriculture portfolio when Rasool was succeeded by Lynne Brown in 2008.

== Farming career ==
He left the legislature after the next general election in 2009 and subsequently farmed olives on a smallholding in Tulbagh. He also served as the inaugural chairperson of the South African Agricultural Association and was a director of the Agri Mega Group until November 2012.

== Personal life and death ==
He was married to Judith Dowry, with whom he had eight children. He died on 5 May 2014, aged 67, after being diagnosed with pancreatic cancer.
