= Carol Beerwinkel =

South African politician

Member of the Western Cape Provincial Parliament
- In office 6 May 2009 – 7 May 2019

Personal details
- Party: African National Congress
- Profession: Politician

Carol Frances Beerwinkel is a South African politician who served as a Member of the Western Cape Provincial Parliament from May 2009 until May 2019. Beerwinkel is a member of the African National Congress.

== Western Cape Provincial Parliament ==
Beerwinkel is a member of the African National Congress. She was elected to the Western Cape Provincial Parliament in the 2009 election. She took office on 6 May 2009.

Beerwinkel was re-elected for a second term as a provincial parliamentarian in the 2014 provincial election. She left the provincial parliament on 7 May 2019, as she was not placed on the ANC's list for that year's provincial election.
