= Johan Gelderblom =

South African politician

Member of the National Assembly of South Africa
- In office 6 May 2009 – 6 May 2014
- Constituency: Western Cape

Western Cape Minister of Agriculture and Tourism, and Environmental Affairs
- In office 5 December 2001 – 30 April 2004
- Premier: Marthinus van Schalkwyk; Peter Marais
- Preceded by: Gerrit van Rensburg
- Succeeded by: Kobus Dowry

Personal details
- Party: African National Congress (2005–present)
- Other political affiliations: New National Party (Until 2005)
- Education: Stellenbosch University
- Profession: Politician

Johan Pieter Gelderblom is a South African retired politician. A former member of the New National Party, he served as a party representative in the Western Cape Provincial Parliament. From 2001 to 2004, he served as the Western Cape Minister of Agriculture and Tourism, and Environmental Affairs. After the 2004 election, he became the chairperson of the provincial parliament's Standing Committee on Public Accounts (SCOPA). He joined the African National Congress in 2005. Gelderblom served as an ANC MP from 2009 to 2014.

== Education ==
Gelderblom graduated from Stellenbosch University with a Bachelor of Arts Honours degree in 1975.

== Political career ==
Gelderblom was elected to the Western Cape Provincial Parliament as a representative of the New National Party. He served as chair of the Standing Committee on Community Safety & Economic Affairs. In December 2001, Gelderblom was appointed by NNP premier Peter Marais as the Minister of Agriculture, Tourism and Gambling. Geldemblom remained in his position following NNP leader Marthinus van Schalkwyk's election as premier. He later took over the Environment Affairs and Development Planning portfolio following David Malatsi's departure from the executive.

Following the NNP's poor performance in the 2004 election, there was uncertainty on whether Gelderblom would remain in his position. The newly elected premier Ebrahim Rasool from the African National Congress did not reappoint Gelderblom to the provincial cabinet. Gelderblom was instead appointed as the Chairperson of the Standing Committee on Public Accounts (SCOPA). During the 2005 floor crossing period, Gelderblom crossed the floor and joined the ANC.

In 2007, he was appointed as the Chairperson on Social Development and Heath Committee. Gelderblom was elected as an ANC Member of Parliament in the National Assembly. During his time in parliament, he served on the Standing Committee on Appropriations. In 2011, he was elected onto the ANC's provincial executive committee in the Western Cape. Gelderblom was not placed on the ANC candidate lists for the 2014 elections, and he left the National Assembly on 6 May 2014.
