= Gerrit van Rensburg =

South African farmer and politician (1948–2021)

- Van Rensburg in 2014

Western Cape Minister of Agriculture
- In office 8 May 2009 – 26 May 2014
- Premier: Helen Zille
- Preceded by: Cobus Dowry
- Succeeded by: Alan Winde
- In office June 1999 – December 2001
- Premier: Gerald Morkel
- Preceded by: Lampie Fick
- Succeeded by: Johan Gelderblom

Member of the Western Cape Provincial Parliament
- In office June 1999 – May 2014

Personal details
- Born: Hendrik Gerhardus van Rensburg; 26 May 1948
- Died: 11 January 2021 (aged 72)
- Party: Democratic Alliance (2003 onwards)
- Other political affiliations: New National Party (Until 2003)
- Spouse: Christa
- Education: Stellenbosch University

Hendrik Gerhardus van Rensburg (26 May 1948 – 11 January 2021) was a South African farmer and politician. Initially a member of the New National Party, he was elected to the Western Cape Provincial Parliament in 1999. He was then appointed Provincial Minister for Agriculture, a post he would hold until December 2001. He defected to the Democratic Alliance in 2003. Following the DA's victory in the Western Cape, he would serve as the Provincial Minister of Agriculture again until his retirement from politics in 2014.

== Early life and career ==
Van Rensburg was born on 26 May 1948. He studied agriculture at the Stellenbosch University and was a farmer in Mossel Bay. Van Rensburg was also the secretary of the Agricultural Societies and Unions for 15 years. Van Rensburg was a member of the Western Cape Agriculture Executive for 13 years, during which he was vice-chairman for three years as well as president for another three years. He received an honorary presidency from Agri Western Cape in June 2005.

== Political career ==
Van Rensburg was elected to the Western Cape Provincial Parliament in the 1999 provincial election as a member of the New National Party. He was appointed as the Provincial Minister for Agriculture by premier Gerald Morkel following his swearing-in. He held this post until Peter Marais was elected premier and announced his executive council in December 2001, which saw Johan Gelderblom succeed Van Rensburg as the Provincial Minister for Agriculture. Van Rensburg defected to the Democratic Alliance during the 2003 floor-crossing window, which resulted in him keeping his seat in the Provincial Parliament. He was then elected for another term in the provincial parliament, this time as a member of the DA, in the 2004 provincial election.

Following the DA's victory in the Western Cape in the 2009 provincial election, Van Rensburg returned as the Provincial Minister of Agriculture in the provincial cabinet led by premier Helen Zille. He announced his retirement from politics in January 2014 and left office following the provincial election in May 2014.

== Personal life and death ==
Van Rensburg died from cancer on 11 January 2021, at the age of 72. The incumbent Western Cape Minister of Agriculture, Ivan Meyer, paid tribute to Van Rensburg.
