= Fortune Faded =

Single by Red Hot Chili Peppers

from the album Greatest Hits
- B-side: "Eskimo"; "Bunker Hill"
- Released: November 3, 2003
- Recorded: 2001
- Studio: The Mansion, Los Angeles, California
- Genre: Alternative rock, funk rock
- Length: 3:21
- Label: Warner Bros.
- Songwriters: Flea, Frusciante, Kiedis, Smith
- Producer: Rick Rubin

Red Hot Chili Peppers singles chronology
"Universally Speaking" (2003)	"Fortune Faded" (2003)	"Dani California" (2006)

Music video
- "Fortune Faded" on YouTube

"Fortune Faded" is a song by the Red Hot Chili Peppers. It was released in 2003 as a single, to coincide with the release of their Greatest Hits album. The song, along with "Save the Population" (another song from their Greatest Hits), was recorded at The Mansion and produced by Rick Rubin. A music video was also produced.

One of the single's B-sides, "Bunker Hill" was originally recorded for Californication, while the other, "Eskimo", was written during By the Way. The second version of the single, with blue printing instead of red on the cover art, was never released in the UK due to last minute complications, as the second release was too long to be classed as a single. UK chart singles must not last over 20 minutes in length. "Tuesday Night in Berlin" was a live jam recorded in Berlin and features Ekkehard Ehlers producing sound effects throughout the jam. Sometime into the jam, Flea switches to trumpet and Frusciante plays bass for the remainder of the jam.

"Fortune Faded" was originally recorded for the By the Way album and was played live a few times in 2001 with a chorus that is different from the Greatest Hits version. The band did not like how the By the Way sessions version sounded; as such, it was re-recorded for the Greatest Hits collection. After the chorus' change, the band performed the original version once in 2005. A rough mix with a guide vocal of the By The Way sessions version with the original chorus has surfaced online, but has never been officially released by the band.

== Track list ==
CD single (2003)

1. "Fortune Faded" (album) – 3:23
2. "Eskimo" (previously unreleased) – 5:31
3. "Bunker Hill" (previously unreleased) – 3:29

CD version 2 (2003)

1. "Fortune Faded" (album) – 3:23
2. "Californication" (remixed by Ekkehard Ehlers) – 5:57
3. "Tuesday Night in Berlin" (live) – 14:22

== Personnel ==
- Anthony Kiedis - lead vocals
- John Frusciante - guitars, backing vocals
- Flea - bass guitar
- Chad Smith - drums

== Charts ==
=== Weekly charts ===
Weekly chart performance for "Fortune Faded"
Chart (2003–2004)	Peak position
Australia (ARIA)	16
Austria (Ö3 Austria Top 40)	68
Belgium (Ultratip Bubbling Under Flanders)	14
Croatia (HRT)	3
Germany (GfK)	46
Ireland (IRMA)	20
Italy (FIMI)	24
Netherlands (Dutch Top 40)	34
Netherlands (Single Top 100)	61
New Zealand (Recorded Music NZ)	37
Scotland Singles (OCC)	8
Sweden (Sverigetopplistan)	44
Switzerland (Schweizer Hitparade)	59
UK Singles (OCC)	11
UK Rock & Metal (OCC)	1
US Bubbling Under Hot 100 (Billboard)	23
US Alternative Airplay (Billboard)	8
US Mainstream Rock (Billboard)	22

=== Year-end charts ===
Year-end chart performance for "Fortune Faded"
Chart (2004)	Position
US Modern Rock Tracks (Billboard)	47
