= Peter Gelderblom =

Dutch DJ and record producer (born 1965)

- Born: 27 September 1965 (age 60); Gouda, South Holland, Netherlands
- Genres: Dance; house
- Occupations: Musician; DJ; record producer
- Instruments: keyboards, turntables
- Years active: 1979–present

Peter Gelderblom (Dutch pronunciation: [ˈpeːtər ˈɣɛldərblɔm]; born 27 September 1965) is a Dutch DJ and record producer.

== Biography ==
Peter Gelderblom is inspired by among other Earth Wind and Fire, Donna Summer and Ohio Players. He has worked for several years as a DJ in various clubs in Rotterdam. Peter Gelderblom broke through with the single "Waiting 4" in the Netherlands in 2007. This came in the Dutch Top 40 at number 11.

In 2020 Peter Gelderblom founded the radiostation Isla 106.

== Discography ==
=== Charting singles ===
Year	Title	Peak chart positions												Album
Year	Title	NLD	AUS	AUT	BEL (Vl)	BEL (Wa)	FRA	GER	IRL	SPA	SWE	SWI	UK	Album
2006	"Strike Me Down" (with Wally Lopez and Rene Amesz)	—	—	—	—	—	—	—	—	13	—	—	—	Non-album singles
2007	"Waiting 4"	12	—	—	48	—	—	—	—	13	—	—	29	Non-album singles
2007	"Snap" (with Rene Amesz)	85	—	—	—	—	—	—	—	—	—	—	—	Non-album singles
2008	"Trapped" (vs. Muzikjunki)	26	—	—	—	—	—	—	—	—	—	—	—	Non-album singles
2008	"Feelin 4 You" (with DJ Chus)	36	—	—	20^{[A]}	—	—	—	—	—	—	—	—	Non-album singles
2009	"Lost"	50	—	—	—	—	—	—	—	—	—	—	—	Non-album singles
2011	"Waiting 4" (2011 Remixes)	12	—	—	—	—	—	—	—	—	—	—	—	Non-album singles
"—" denotes a recording that did not chart or was not released in that territory.

=== Singles ===
- 2007 Peter Gelderblom - Waiting 4
- 2008 DJ Chus & Peter Gelderblom - Feelin' 4 You
- 2008 Peter Gelderblom & Muzikjunki - Trapped
- 2008 Peter Gelderblom - Where The Streets Have no name
- 2009 Peter Gelderblom - Lost
- 2010 Peter Gelderblom & Aad Mouthaan - Just A Feeling
- 2011 Peter Gelderblom - Satisfaction
- 2011 Peter Gelderblom & Dominica - I Gotta Let You Go
- 2015 Peter Gelderblom & Randy Collé feat Kris Kiss - The Ride
