= The Zephyr Song =

2002 single by Red Hot Chili Peppers

Single by Red Hot Chili Peppers

from the album By the Way
- B-side: "Body of Water"; "Someone"; "Out of Range"; "Rivers of Avalon"
- Released: August 17, 2002
- Genre: Psychedelic rock
- Length: 3:53
- Label: Warner Bros.
- Songwriters: Flea; John Frusciante; Anthony Kiedis; Chad Smith
- Producer: Rick Rubin

Red Hot Chili Peppers singles chronology
| "By the Way" (2002) | "The Zephyr Song" (2002) | "Can't Stop" (2003) |

Music video
- "The Zephyr Song" on YouTube

"The Zephyr Song" is a song by American rock band Red Hot Chili Peppers, released as the second single released from their eighth studio album, By the Way (2002), on August 17, 2002. The song, as a single, was released in two parts. Both editions held two previously unheard-of B-sides, making it, collectively, hold four non-LP tracks. The single peaked at number six on the US Billboard Modern Rock chart, breaking the band's streak of three straight number-one hits.

== Composition ==
The song is about nature's healing power and human connection. In April 2017, it was revealed that John Frusciante unintentionally interpolated the song "Pure Imagination" from the 1971 film Willy Wonka & the Chocolate Factory. The song's opening three guitar notes are the same as the first three sung notes from "Pure Imagination".

== Music video ==
The music video, which was released on September 30, 2002, was directed by Jonathan Dayton and Valerie Faris. The couple previously collaborated with the band on other videos and would continue to work with the band through the middle of the 2000s. It is generally reminiscent of a kaleidoscope, by utilizing circular and intertwining figures to achieve the psychedelic feel the band was aiming for. Kiedis would later say of the video:

John and Flea wanted something incredibly, just kind of obscure and psychedelic. Finding true psychedelia in this day and age is really hard to do, because everyone wants to rely on computers and all the stuff that really doesn't know how to find the core of psychedelia. So I had my reservations, but there are some moments in this video where I think it's captured.

The music video also features Flea's partner at the time, Tobey Torres.

== Track listings ==
CD single 1
| No. | Title | Length |
|---|---|---|
| 1. | "The Zephyr Song" | 3:52 |
| 2. | "Body of Water" | 4:41 |
| 3. | "Someone" | 3:24 |

CD single 2
| No. | Title | Length |
|---|---|---|
| 1. | "The Zephyr Song" | 3:52 |
| 2. | "Out of Range" | 3:58 |
| 3. | "Rivers of Avalon" | 3:39 |

CD single 3
| No. | Title | Length |
|---|---|---|
| 1. | "The Zephyr Song" | 3:52 |
| 2. | "Out of Range" | 3:58 |

7" vinyl
| No. | Title | Length |
|---|---|---|
| 1. | "The Zephyr Song" | 3:52 |
| 2. | "Out of Range" | 3:58 |

== Personnel ==
Red Hot Chili Peppers

- John Frusciante – guitar, backing vocals, keyboards
- Flea – bass
- Anthony Kiedis – lead vocals, double-tracked lead vocals (chorus)
- Chad Smith – drums, drum machine

== Charts ==
=== Weekly charts ===
Weekly chart performance for "The Zephyr Song"
| Chart (2002) | Peak position |
|---|---|
| Australia (ARIA) | 21 |
| Canada (Nielsen SoundScan) | 11 |
| Croatia (HRT) | 2 |
| Europe (Eurochart Hot 100) | 29 |
| France (SNEP) | 90 |
| Germany (GfK) | 65 |
| Hungary (Single Top 40) | 13 |
| Ireland (IRMA) | 22 |
| Italy (FIMI) | 20 |
| Netherlands (Single Top 100) | 72 |
| New Zealand (Recorded Music NZ) | 9 |
| Scotland Singles (Official Charts) | 13 |
| Switzerland (Schweizer Hitparade) | 100 |
| UK Singles (Official Charts) | 11 |
| UK Rock & Metal (Official Charts) | 1 |
| US Billboard Hot 100 | 49 |
| US Adult Alternative Airplay (Billboard) | 1 |
| US Adult Pop Airplay (Billboard) | 17 |
| US Alternative Airplay (Billboard) | 6 |
| US Mainstream Rock (Billboard) | 14 |

=== Year-end charts ===
2002 year-end chart performance for "The Zephyr Song"
| Chart (2002) | Position |
|---|---|
| Brazil (Crowley) | 84 |
| Canada (Nielsen SoundScan) | 81 |
| US Modern Rock Tracks (Billboard) | 45 |
| US Triple-A (Billboard) | 25 |

2003 year-end chart performance for "The Zephyr Song"
| Chart (2003) | Position |
|---|---|
| US Adult Top 40 (Billboard) | 49 |
| US Modern Rock Tracks (Billboard) | 87 |
| US Triple-A (Billboard) | 30 |

== Certifications ==
Certifications and sales for "The Zephyr Song"
| Region | Certification | Certified units/sales |
|---|---|---|
| New Zealand (RMNZ) | Platinum | 30,000^{‡} |
| United Kingdom (BPI) | Platinum | 600,000^{‡} |
| United States (RIAA) | Gold | 500,000^{‡} |
^{‡} Sales+streaming figures based on certification alone.

== Release history ==
Release dates and formats for "The Zephyr Song"
| Region | Date | Format(s) | Label(s) | Ref(s). |
|---|---|---|---|---|
| United States | August 17, 2002 | Maxi-CD | Warner Bros. | |
| United States | September 16, 2002 | Mainstream rock; active rock; triple A; alternative radio | Warner Bros. | |
| Australia | October 7, 2002 | CD | Warner Bros. | |
| United Kingdom | October 21, 2002 | CD | Warner Bros. | |
| Japan | October 23, 2002 | CD | Warner Bros. | |
