= Can't Stop (Red Hot Chili Peppers song) =

2003 single by Red Hot Chili Peppers

Single by Red Hot Chili Peppers

from the album By the Way
- Released: February 3, 2003
- Genre: Funk rock; alternative rock; rap rock
- Length: 4:29
- Label: Warner Bros.
- Songwriters: Flea; John Frusciante; Anthony Kiedis; Chad Smith
- Producer: Rick Rubin

Red Hot Chili Peppers singles chronology
"The Zephyr Song" (2002)	"Can't Stop" (2003)	"Dosed" (2003)

Music video
- "Can't Stop" on YouTube

"Can't Stop" is a song by the American rock band Red Hot Chili Peppers, from their eighth studio album, By the Way (2002). It was released as the third single from the album on February 3, 2003. "Can't Stop" became the band's eighth number one on the US Billboard Modern Rock Tracks chart, where it was number one for three weeks. It reached number 57 on the Billboard Hot 100 and entered the top 40 in several other countries.

== Composition ==
The song is instrumentally composed in 4/4 standard time and in the key of E minor. The verse plays twice before the bridge, as well as the chorus. During the bridge, guitarist John Frusciante plays sparsely in a reggae style, only strumming on the up-beat. Following the bridge, Frusciante utilizes a fuzz (Big Muff Pi by Electro Harmonix) in his solo. He also makes extensive use of a tone-bend.

Lyrically, "Can't Stop" is a prime example of the band's occasional use of writing lyrics to an established rhythm, rather than rhythms to established lyrics. Anthony Kiedis writes in his typical circumlocutory style. Nonetheless, the predominant theme of cultivating an inner, personal energy (evidenced in the title and the final line: "This life is more than just a read-through.") can be understood in almost every line. The verses are addressed to the listener (or perhaps to himself), in an instructional tone, with references to Kiedis's own life, as well as citing the inspiration of Defunkt ("Defunkt, the pistol that you pay for") and Julia Butterfly Hill ("J. Butterfly is in the treetops"). The bridge marks a slight departure, as Kiedis suggests he had temporarily forgotten this philosophy, and looks to a new girlfriend to help himself back on his feet.

== Reception and chart performance ==
The song itself is distinct, especially when in comparison to the various other tracks on By the Way. Some consider the song to be among the only true punk/funk sounds on the entire album, along with "Throw Away Your Television". "Can't Stop" was considered to be "energetic" and melodically encompassing, by combining textured, melodic, and funky themes together into one. It has been widely regarded as one of the band's best songs.

The song was the Chili Peppers' eighth number one on the Modern Rock Tracks chart, and second from the album By the Way. It also peaked at number 57 on the Billboard Hot 100. The song is a live performance staple for the band.

== Music video ==
The Mark Romanek-directed music video for the single was released on January 24, 2003. It features all four of the band members doing seemingly random and excessively abstract actions such as holding many water bottles or attempting to balance buckets on their heads. It begins with the camera swooping through a yellow tube to Anthony Kiedis, wearing glasses, and is subsequently followed by the foursome running through a hall with light fixtures attached to their backs. The band engages in various activities, such as wearing a giant purple hippopotamus mask, playing with rubber balls, jumping, abstract scenes with boxes, buckets, water bottles, trash cans, flying through the air, pink foam peanuts, plants, playing guitar in a room full of empty blue chairs/room with lamps turning on and off, and ends with Anthony Kiedis standing in a perfectly cut hole in a brick wall.

At certain segments of the video, guitarist John Frusciante is playing a silver Fender Stratocaster and an orange Toronado, which is unlike his style due to the fact that he only plays vintage guitars (both guitars being under five years of age). Frusciante later explained he was instructed to play the guitars by director Mark Romanek since they blended well with the color scheme used in the video.

Inspiration for the video was attributed to Austrian artist Erwin Wurm, as indicated by the sign at the end of the video. The lighting was positioned in order to provide a clean-cut, contemporary atmosphere which would integrate with the video's concept. Orange was chosen to be the backsplash color by Romanek. His creative hand attempted to mirror Wurm's abstract "One Minute Sculptures", by having the band perform random scenes, which seem to fit no purpose. However, in retrospect, they were not intended to be anything more than an homage.

The music video includes alternate audio mixing than what was published on the feature album, By the Way. The alternate mixing was provided by Frusciante, who made the bass, backing vocals, and handclaps much less quiet. This alternate mixing was released under the CD singles 2, 3, & the 7-inch single as "Can't Stop" (John Frusciante single mix).

== Track listings ==
CD single 1

1. "Can't Stop" (John Frusciante single mix) – 4:29
2. "If You Have to Ask" (live)
3. "Christchurch Fireworks Music" (live) – 5:42

CD single 2

1. "Can't Stop" (John Frusciante single mix) – 4:29
2. "Right on Time" (live)
3. "Nothing to Lose" (live) – 12:58

CD single 3 and 7-inch single

1. "Can't Stop" (John Frusciante single mix) – 4:29
2. "Christchurch Fireworks Music" (live) – 5:42

== Personnel ==
Red Hot Chili Peppers

- Anthony Kiedis – lead vocals
- John Frusciante – guitar, handclaps, backing vocals
- Flea – bass
- Chad Smith – drums, handclaps

== Charts ==
2003 weekly chart performance for "Can't Stop"
Chart (2003)	Peak position
Australia (ARIA)	38
Austria (Ö3 Austria Top 40)	65
Canada (Nielsen SoundScan)	31
Croatia (HRT)	7
Europe (Eurochart Hot 100)	47
France (SNEP)	68
Germany (GfK)	48
Ireland (IRMA)	30
Italy (FIMI)	22
Netherlands (Dutch Top 40)	23
Netherlands (Single Top 100)	65
New Zealand (Recorded Music NZ)	40
Scottish Singles Sales (Official Charts)	16
Sweden (Sverigetopplistan)	70
Switzerland (Schweizer Hitparade)	39
UK Singles (Official Charts)	22
UK Rock & Metal (Official Charts)	2
US Billboard Hot 100	57
US Alternative Airplay (Billboard)	1
US Mainstream Rock (Billboard)	15

2016 weekly chart performance for "Can't Stop"
Chart (2016)	Peak position
Hungary (Single Top 40)	23

2023 weekly chart performance for "Can't Stop"
Chart (2023)	Peak position
Japan Hot Overseas (Billboard Japan)	20

2026 weekly chart performance for "Can't Stop"
Chart (2026)	Peak position
Global 200 (Billboard)	142
Kazakhstan Airplay (TopHit)	65

== Certifications ==
Certifications and sales for "Can't Stop"
Region	Certification	Certified units/sales
Denmark (IFPI Danmark)	Platinum	90,000^{‡}
Germany (BVMI)	Platinum	300,000^{‡}
Italy (FIMI)	Platinum	50,000^{‡}
New Zealand (RMNZ)	6× Platinum	180,000^{‡}
Portugal (AFP)	3× Platinum	30,000^{‡}
Spain (Promusicae)	Platinum	60,000^{‡}
United Kingdom (BPI)	4× Platinum	2,400,000^{‡}
United States (RIAA)	3× Platinum	3,000,000^{‡}
^{‡} Sales+streaming figures based on certification alone.

== Release history ==
Release history and formats for "Can't Stop"
Region	Date	Format(s)	Label(s)	Ref.
Australia	February 3, 2003	CD	Warner Bros.	
United Kingdom	February 10, 2003	CD	Warner Bros.	
Japan	February 13, 2003	CD	Warner Bros.	
Germany	February 20, 2003	CD	Warner Bros.	

== In other media ==
The Los Angeles Rams often use the song to start crowd chants or when the team enters the field from the player tunnel. Alice Cooper guitarist Nita Strauss often performs the song in an effort to entertain fans.

In 2019, Australian hip-hop group Hilltop Hoods performed a cover of the song on Triple J's Like a Version.

The song was performed by the Red Hot Chili Peppers during the LA28 segment of the 2024 Summer Olympics closing ceremony.

The song was featured in WWE 2k23.

In the Season 4 premiere of Love, Death + Robots titled "Can't Stop", the Red Hot Chili Peppers perform the titular track using audio from their live performance at Slane Castle in 2003. The band and the entire audience are portrayed as marionette puppets as the episode highlights multiple eras throughout the band's history. The episode was directed by David Fincher.

This was also used as an entrance song for two-time world heavyweight champion Wladimir Klitschko, which was used from 2005 until his final fight in April 2017.
