= By the Way (Red Hot Chili Peppers song) =

2002 single by Red Hot Chili Peppers

Single by Red Hot Chili Peppers

from the album By the Way
- B-side: "Time"; "Teenager in Love"
- Released: June 24, 2002
- Genre: Funk rock; alternative rock; rap rock; hard rock
- Length: 3:37
- Label: Warner Bros.
- Songwriters: Flea; John Frusciante; Anthony Kiedis; Chad Smith
- Producer: Rick Rubin

Red Hot Chili Peppers singles chronology
| "Parallel Universe" (2001) | "By the Way" (2002) | "The Zephyr Song" (2002) |

Music video
- "By the Way" on YouTube

"By the Way" is a song by American rock band Red Hot Chili Peppers. It is the title track and first single released from the band's eighth studio album of the same name (2002), on June 24, 2002. The song was the band's sixth number-one hit on the Modern Rock Tracks chart and spent seven weeks at number one on the Mainstream Rock Tracks chart. Internationally, the song reached number two in the United Kingdom, becoming the band's highest-peaking single there alongside "Dani California", and peaked atop the Italian Singles Chart.

Regarding its release, guitarist John Frusciante noted: "It wasn't really our decision to put that song out first, but our managers thought it was an exciting song and their enthusiasm convinced us. I guess they thought that it combined the wild part of our sound with the melodic part of our sound." Vocalist Anthony Kiedis elaborated: "I thought that single was an über-bombastic assault of non-commercialism. For it to be so well-received [in the [United Kingdom] was shocking to me, but thrilling at the same time."

== Reception ==
"By the Way" has been widely lauded as one of the band's best songs. In 2021, Kerrang ranked the song number nine on their list of the 20 greatest Red Hot Chili Peppers songs, and in 2022, Rolling Stone ranked the song number eight on their list of the 40 greatest Red Hot Chili Peppers songs.

== Music video ==
The music video was directed by Jonathan Dayton and Valerie Faris, a couple who have directed many other music videos for the band. The video was released on June 10, 2002.

The video starts off with Kiedis calling for a taxi at the intersection of Echo Park Ave and Silver Lake Blvd. He gets in the taxi and the cabbie (played by Dave Sheridan reprising his character of Doug Wilson from Ghost World) realizes he has him as his passenger. To please him, the driver puts a copy of the "By the Way" single into the taxi CD player, making Kiedis smile slightly. Suddenly, the cabbie begins driving out of control as he lip-syncs the song while driving rambunctiously throughout the streets of Los Angeles. After he locks the car door, an uncomfortable and apprehensive Kiedis attempts to make a call on his cell phone, but the cabbie brakes so hard that Kiedis loses grip of it. The cabbie snatches the phone and throws it out the window, then drives the car in a cloud of dust and backs up under a bridge.

While there, the cabbie pulls out flare sticks and begins to torture Kiedis through awkward dancing while the latter finally pages bassist Flea and Frusciante (with a message reading, "Help! Been kidnapped."), who are having lunch in a cafe. At first, they think it's a hoax, so they ignore the first message. When Kiedis pages them for the second time, they set out on Flea's Ford Bronco to find him with the crazy cabbie in the taxi. A wild chase and road rage ensues. Kiedis soon sees Flea and Frusciante, breaks out of the taxi window, and jumps in Flea's truck with a sigh of relief as the three escape the cabbie. At the end of the video, drummer Chad Smith flags down the taxi, with the cabbie realizing he is also a member of the band, so he lets him in and drives off with him. However, Chad is unaware that this is the same taxi man that kidnapped Kiedis and also ignores the broken glass.

Kiedis said of the video:

It's kidnapping... A cab driver kidnaps me and just goes haywire through the town; he's a fan, but he’s kind of a [pause] obsessive, compulsive, psychologically misarranged fan, and he sees me and starts enjoying himself a little too much and my friends have to come and rescue me.

The fast and often jerky camera angles used in the high-speed chase sequences are based on the 2000 Mexican film Amores Perros in which all the characters are linked by a car crash at the beginning of the film; before the crash is an almost identical high speed car chase sequence.

== Live performances ==
"By the Way" has been performed over 600 times since 2002, making it the band's fourth-most-performed song.

== Track listing ==
CD single and Australia CD1

1. "By the Way" – 3:35
2. "Time" – 3:47
3. "A Teenager in Love" – 3:01

CD version 2 and Australia CD2

1. "By the Way" – 3:35
2. "Search and Destroy" (Live) – 12:13
3. "What Is Soul?" (Live) – 3:58

CD version 3

1. "By the Way"
2. "Time"
3. "Search and Destroy" (Live)

CD version 4, UK and Japanese CD single

1. "By the Way" – 3:35
2. "Time" – 3:47
3. "Teenager in Love" – 3:01
4. "Search and Destroy" (Live) – 12:13

7-inch single and Canadian CD single

1. "By the Way"
2. "Time"

DVD single

1. "By the Way" (music video) – 3:36; directed by Jonathan Dayton and Valerie Faris
2. "Obsessive, Compulsive, Psychologically, Misarranged Cabdriver/Fan (aka the making of "By the Way")" – 13:45; directed by Byron Shaw and Bart Lipton for Brown & Serve
3. "By the Way" (Performance Version) – 3:36

== Personnel ==
Red Hot Chili Peppers

- Anthony Kiedis – lead vocals
- John Frusciante – guitar, backing vocals
- Flea – bass
- Chad Smith – drums, tambourine

== Charts ==
=== Weekly charts ===
2002 weekly chart performance for "By the Way"
| Chart (2002) | Peak position |
|---|---|
| Australia (ARIA) | 6 |
| Austria (Ö3 Austria Top 40) | 7 |
| Belgium (Ultratop 50 Flanders) | 50 |
| Belgium (Ultratop 50 Wallonia) | 31 |
| Canada (Nielsen SoundScan) | 2 |
| Croatia International Airplay (Top lista) | 9 |
| Czech Republic (IFPI ČR) | 10 |
| Denmark (Tracklisten) | 6 |
| Europe (Eurochart Hot 100) | 3 |
| Finland (Suomen virallinen lista) | 4 |
| France (SNEP) | 29 |
| Germany (GfK) | 22 |
| Greece (IFPI) | 5 |
| Hungary (Single Top 40) | 8 |
| Ireland (IRMA) | 7 |
| Italy (FIMI) | 1 |
| Netherlands (Dutch Top 40) | 9 |
| Netherlands (Single Top 100) | 12 |
| New Zealand (Recorded Music NZ) | 13 |
| Norway (VG-lista) | 6 |
| Poland (PiF PaF) | 4 |
| Scotland Singles (Official Charts) | 3 |
| Spain (Promusicae) | 5 |
| Sweden (Sverigetopplistan) | 7 |
| Switzerland (Schweizer Hitparade) | 8 |
| UK Singles (Official Charts) | 2 |
| UK Rock & Metal (Official Charts) | 1 |
| US Billboard Hot 100 | 34 |
| US Alternative Airplay (Billboard) | 1 |
| US Mainstream Rock (Billboard) | 1 |

2025–2026 weekly chart performance for "By the Way"
| Chart (2025–2026) | Peak position |
|---|---|
| Portugal Airplay (AFP) | 95 |
| Russia Streaming (TopHit) | 98 |

=== Year-end charts ===
Year-end chart performance for "By the Way"
| Chart (2002) | Position |
|---|---|
| Australia (ARIA) | 52 |
| Austria (Ö3 Austria Top 40) | 57 |
| Brazil (Crowley) | 99 |
| Canada (Nielsen SoundScan) | 32 |
| Canada Radio (Nielsen BDS) | 47 |
| Europe (Eurochart Hot 100) | 74 |
| Ireland (IRMA) | 59 |
| Italy (FIMI) | 13 |
| Netherlands (Dutch Top 40) | 41 |
| Netherlands (Single Top 100) | 94 |
| Sweden (Hitlistan) | 62 |
| Switzerland (Schweizer Hitparade) | 30 |
| UK Singles (OCC) | 92 |
| US Mainstream Rock Tracks (Billboard) | 10 |
| US Modern Rock Tracks (Billboard) | 4 |

=== Decade-end charts ===
Decade-end chart performance for "By the Way"
| Chart (2000–2009) | Position |
|---|---|
| US Hot Rock Songs (Billboard) | 15 |

== Certifications ==
Certifications and sales for "By the Way"
| Region | Certification | Certified units/sales |
|---|---|---|
| Australia (ARIA) | Gold | 35,000^{^} |
| Italy (FIMI) | Gold | 25,000^{*} |
| Japan (RIAJ) 2006 digital release | Gold | 100,000^{*} |
| Spain (Promusicae) | Gold | 30,000^{‡} |
| United Kingdom (BPI) | 2× Platinum | 1,200,000^{‡} |
| United States (RIAA) | 2× Platinum | 2,000,000^{*} |
^{*} Sales figures based on certification alone.^{^} Shipments figures based on certification alone.^{‡} Sales+streaming figures based on certification alone.

== Release history ==
Release dates and formats for "By the Way"
| Region | Date | Format(s) | Label(s) | Ref. |
|---|---|---|---|---|
| United States | June 3, 2002 | Triple A radio | Warner Bros. | |
| Australia | June 24, 2002 | CD | Warner Bros. | |
| United Kingdom | July 1, 2002 | CD | Warner Bros. | |
| Japan | July 10, 2002 | CD | Warner Bros. | |

== "Waiting 4" Peter Gelderblom remix ==
"Waiting 4"

Single by Peter Gelderblom
- Released: December 3, 2007
- Length: 3:15
- Label: Data
- Songwriters: Flea; John Frusciante; Anthony Kiedis; Chad Smith
- Producers: Rene Amesz; Peter Gelderblom

A remix of "By the Way" by Peter Gelderblom with co-production by Rene Amesz, was released on July 5, 2007, and became a popular track in clubs worldwide despite being released without the band's knowledge or approval. The song is called "Waiting 4", which is a prominently featured lyric in the original song. It reached number 29 for one week in the United Kingdom in December 2007. It is included on the compilation Wild Weekends 04 (2007). It was C-listed by BBC Radio 1. A music video was made for the single. It was uploaded on Data Records' official YouTube account on November 13, 2007.

=== Charts ===
Weekly chart performance for "Waiting 4"
| Chart (2007) | Peak position |
|---|---|
| Scotland Singles (Official Charts) | 28 |
| UK Singles (Official Charts) | 29 |
| UK Dance (Official Charts) | 2 |
