= Jane's Addiction (album) =

Live album by Jane's Addiction
- Released: May 15, 1987
- Recorded: 1987
- Venue: The Roxy Theatre, West Hollywood
- Studio: The Edge Studio, Los Angeles
- Genre: Alternative rock
- Length: 40:01
- Label: Triple X
- Producer: Mark Linett; Jane's Addiction

Jane's Addiction chronology
Jane's Addiction (1987)	Nothing's Shocking (1988)

Jane's Addiction is the debut live album by American rock band Jane's Addiction, released on May 15, 1987, through Triple X Records. Its basic tracks were recorded live at the Roxy Theatre in Los Angeles, with additional overdubs and corrections recorded at The Edge Studio in Los Angeles.

== Background ==
Jane's Addiction were formed in the fall of 1985 out of the ashes of singer Perry Farrell's previous band Psi Com. The core of the band at its beginning was Farrell and bassist Eric Avery, who began writing songs together. The group's first gig was in October 1985 at Safari Sam's in Huntington Beach, although there was a quick succession of guitarists and drummers until January 1986, when Avery's sister recommended her boyfriend Stephen Perkins on drums. A demo tape was recorded at Radio Tokyo studios in Venice later that month with Farrell, Avery, Perkins and guitarist Ed Dobrydnio featuring the songs "Jane Says", "My Time", "Had a Dad", "Idiots Rule", "Pigs in Zen" and "Mountain Song." In February, Perkins recommended his friend Dave Navarro join to replace Dobrydnio; a month later, Navarro went in and re-recorded the guitar parts in the January demo, with the addition of one more song, "I Would for You" (on which he played keyboards). The demo tape attracted the attention of Triple X Records, a management company who offered them a record deal. The band was offered a three-album contract but Farrell, who did not want to be tied down to a small indie label, agreed to only one.

== Recording ==
It was decided the album would be recorded live at the Roxy Theatre in West Hollywood, held on January 26, 1987. The group performed a 22-song set divided into acoustic and electric halves, featuring nearly their entire repertoire at the time; in addition to the ten songs picked for inclusion on the album, future classics from Nothing's Shocking and Ritual de lo Habitual including "Stop!", "Summertime Rolls", "Three Days", "Ocean Size" and "Mountain Song" were also performed, along with "Slow Divers" and "Kettle Whistle" which would later be found on 1997's Kettle Whistle compilation. Of the original live recording, lead singer Perry Farrell recalled: "There was a lot of heat in that room. Heat from brains and bodies that were fully charged up. I knew it was important to speak to the artisans, but I really felt I was addressing the powers that be, too." Members of the Red Hot Chili Peppers and Henry Rollins were in the audience, along with 150 record executives who Farrell liberally insulted from the stage.

The group then entered The Edge Studio in Los Angeles with producer Mark Linett where extensive overdubs were added, including electric guitar parts overlaid onto "Rock 'n' Roll", "Sympathy" and "Chip Away" from the acoustic set, as well as extra audience noise and applause from a Los Lobos concert. It was decided that side one would feature tracks from the electric half while side two would showcase songs from the acoustic half, reversing the order in which the two sets were performed that night. The total cost of producing the album was $4,000.

"Jane Says" and "Pigs in Zen" were re-recorded a year later for Nothing's Shocking, the band's major label debut. "Whores" and "Chip Away" were re-recorded in 2009 by the reunited Jane's Addiction for the NINJA EP, a collaboration with Nine Inch Nails to promote the joint NINJA tour. Of the eight band originals, only "Trip Away", "1%", "I Would for You", and "My Time" have not been re-recorded in studio takes, although both "My Time" and "I Would for You" had originally been recorded for the 1986 Radio Tokyo demo, with that version of "I Would for You" later appearing on the 1991 compilation Live and Rare as well as the A Cabinet of Curiosities box set.

== Songs ==
Most of the songs on the album were quirky portraits of the street life Farrell had encountered in 1980s Los Angeles, written and rehearsed at a communal house on Wilton Place just south of Hollywood. "Jane Says", which would be re-recorded for Nothing's Shocking and become the group's signature ballad, was about a Wilton housemate of Perry's named Jane Bainter, who he described as "Thick glasses, very outcast, very insecure, a lot like us here. I look at her like a tragic figure. She still hasn’t found love, which is pretty much like us…Every time I see Jane she’s just not quite right, but she’s always hopeful that something great is about to happen. 'I’m gonna kick tomorrow'."

"Pigs in Zen" came out of the experience of an old group of Farrell's that had been involved with Hindu asceticism, abstaining from all pleasure. Farrell differed with that approach: "I read the Gita, I read Black Magic Crowley, the Bible, anything I could get my hands on. If you want to talk about reaching nirvana, reaching Zen, well, the pig is closer than we are because the pig doesn’t have material possessions. He fucks when he wants to, he eats when he's hungry, and he sleeps when he's tired. That's the whole point of Zen." The song often featured a middle break with an improvised rap from the singer, which could vary in length.

"Whores", one of the band's earliest songs, was written about Bianca, their first manager who was a prostitute and earned the money for the group to do early shows. The stripped-down ballad "I Would for You" (using just Avery on bass and Navarro on synth) was written for Farrell's then-girlfriend Casey Niccoli, with the first five lines of the song on the album (prior to "I'm everybody's slave") entirely unique to that night's performance. The song "1%" was introduced on stage at another 1987 show as about Los Angeles gangs, with Perry remarking "the only thing worse than a gang is the government." The heavily psychedelic "Chip Away" often closed the group's performances, where the four would all kneel on the floor and bang on a cooler to create its tribal-sounding percussion; when they reunited to perform it in later years, the cooler was replaced by regular drums. The electric guitar overdubbed onto the end of the performance for the album was never replicated on stage.

The album also featured two covers, "Rock & Roll" by the Velvet Underground and "Sympathy for the Devil" by the Rolling Stones (retitled "Sympathy"), which represented the eclecticism of the group's influences, moving from classic rock to alternative rock. Ironically, Dave Navarro has since revealed "I've always hated the Rolling Stones...We did that song as a joke, and it ended up on the record." Nonetheless, in 2012 "Sympathy" was re-recorded in the studio for the soundtrack to an episode of Sons of Anarchy which Navarro appeared in.

== Style ==
The musical style of Jane's Addiction set the template for the group's sound: a fusion of punk, heavy metal, funk, goth, psychedelia and folk with Farrell's heavily echo-delayed voice on top (Navarro also used prominent delay on his guitar). As Perkins explained:

David and I were just eighteen when Jane’s started. Perry was twenty-six and Eric was twenty-three or twenty-four...We were into more of a hard rock, Led Zeppelin-heavy sound, and had been playing that type of stuff in our high school years. Then Dave and I met those cats, they were more into Echo & the Bunnymen, Joy Division, Siouxsie & the Banshees and Bauhaus. I think that was the sound of Jane’s Addiction; mine and David’s electronic craziness -- you know, we loved to do little flurries, fast drum fills and guitar fills -- and Eric and Perry’s slow, deep, dark sound. At that moment, the scene had, in LA at least, a lot of the glam rock with Ratt and Mötley Crüe and other bands that sounded like them. Many of the people I knew were not going for that, for whatever reason. Then, all of a sudden, there was a big scene that happened and there it was; Jane’s Addiction had the chance to lead it.

The unusual and eclectic sound, different from the glam-metal and hair-metal acts popular in the Sunset Strip scene at the time, immediately caught the attention of local critics who praised the band's early shows. This led to a fierce major-label bidding war, the band eventually settling with Warner Bros. for the following Nothing's Shocking.

== Release and reception ==
Professional ratings
Review scores
Source	Rating
Allmusic	3/5 stars
The Rolling Stone Album Guide	3/5 stars
Select	5/5 stars

Jane's Addiction (also known as XXX Live) was released on vinyl and cassette on May 15, 1987, with a CD release following in 1988. Although the album did not chart nationally, it sold well locally. In a mixed review upon release, BAM magazine wrote "JA are at their best when they crank up the Led Zep-inspired riffs and slam them up against some mighty cold funk bass and drum rhythms", but complained that "Farrell sings like a strangulated cat, with little shading or depth." Billboard noted "Live set recorded at the Roxy showcases Jane's freewheeling, unclassifiable metal/funk hybrid. Lyrics are often rough; radio should select with care."

Retrospective reviews are warmer: "Here is proof that Jane's Addiction surpassed puberty before they came of age", wrote Nick Griffiths in a review of a CD reissue for Select. "Jane's Addiction is sex, obsession, tortured-soul food – a rape of the senses. It's no Immaculate Conception, but it's immaculate." Alex Henderson of AllMusic opined "The L.A. band's unorthodox fusion of Led Zeppelin-influenced hard rock, dark Velvet Underground-ish imagery, and stream-of-consciousness art rock wasn't as focused or confident as it would be on the commanding Ritual de lo Habitual. But even so, the band showed considerable potential." Writing for The Quietus on the album's 25th anniversary, John Freeman complained of a "cleaned and primped mix that emasculated the intensity and exhilaration of a Jane's Addiction gig" before adding "that’s not to say that the album doesn’t contain a significant slug of alchemy", praising "Jane Says", "My Time" and "I Would For You" which "confirmed that Jane's Addiction wouldn't be neatly compartmentalized." In a review of the band's catalog for Louder, Dave Everly notes "Farrell is the dreadlocked high priest of this otherworldly communion, his kettle-whistle voice sounding like it had beamed in from another dimension..."

== Packaging ==
Jane's Addiction has a large number of packaging variations. There are at least four distinct variations of the CD artwork, and seven variations of the vinyl.

The variations all deal with disc color and art; the album cover and liner notes remain consistent across all variations in most cases. The very first CD pressing of the album, which is just a standard silver disc with track names and other info in black typeface, contains a typo in the track list on the disc itself; "Pigs in Zen" is listed as "Pigs in Ten". This typo was corrected on all subsequent pressings.

Later versions of the CD album include a blue colored disc with rounded, stylized text for the track list as well as a version that has the actual cover artwork silkscreened on the disc itself.

== Track listing ==
All tracks are written by Perry Farrell, Dave Navarro, Eric Avery and Stephen Perkins, except where noted.

No.	Title	Writer(s)	Length
1.	"Trip Away"		3:34
2.	"Whores"		4:04
3.	"Pigs in Zen"		4:54
4.	"1%"		3:31
5.	"I Would for You"		3:52
6.	"My Time"		3:32
7.	"Jane Says"		4:52
8.	"Rock 'n' Roll" (The Velvet Underground cover)	Lou Reed	4:03
9.	"Sympathy" (The Rolling Stones cover)	Keith Richards, Mick Jagger	5:25
10.	"Chip Away"		2:43
Total length:			40:01

== Personnel ==
Jane's Addiction

- Perry Farrell – vocals, harmonica, keyboards
- Dave Navarro – guitar, keyboards, bass
- Eric Avery – bass, guitar
- Stephen Perkins – drums, percussion

Production

- Mark Linett – production, mixing
- Patrick von Wiegandt – recording engineer
- Eddy Schreyer – recording engineer

Design

- Karyn Cantor – photography
- Perry Farrell – artwork
