= Live and Rare (Jane's Addiction album) =

Compilation album by Jane's Addiction
- Released: 1991
- Genre: Alternative rock
- Length: 42:29
- Label: Warner Bros.
- Producer: Jane's Addiction

Jane's Addiction chronology
Ritual de lo Habitual (1990)	Live and Rare (1991)	Kettle Whistle (1997)

Professional ratings
Review scores
Source	Rating
Allmusic	2/5 stars

Live and Rare is a compilation album by alternative rock band Jane's Addiction, released in 1991 through Warner Bros. Records. The release is essentially a collection of early b-sides, demos, and live cuts.

== Versions ==
The original two versions of this compilation were released in Japan in late 1991. The first is the regular release; it come with a separate spinal label with the album information in Japanese and a lyric sheet. Lyrics are provided in both English and Japanese. The regular release came with a white CD holder instead of the more traditional gray-black holder.

The second version is a limited-edition version that comes in a coffin box. Only 1000 of these coffin versions were released. It comes with everything that is in the regular version, but also includes four photographs and a numbered certificate.

The third and final version is an Australian re-release of the standard version. The only differences between this and the original version is the lack of Japanese language material, the slightly different disc and spinal printing, and the disc comes on the traditional gray-black disc holder.

== Track listing ==
All tracks are written by Perry Farrell, Dave Navarro, Eric Avery and Stephen Perkins, except where noted.

No.	Title	Writer(s)	Length
1.	"Been Caught Stealing" (12" Single Remix)		4:24
2.	"Had a Dad" (Radio Tokyo Demo, 1986)		3:52
3.	"L.A. Medley" (Live at John Anson Ford Amphitheater, 1989)	The Doors, Exene Cervenka, John Doe, Darby Crash, Pat Smear	3:45
4.	"Had a Dad" (Live at Riviera Theatre, 1989)		5:00
5.	"Three Days" (part 1)		8:14
6.	"Three Days" (part 2)		2:34
7.	"I Would For You" (Radio Tokyo Demo, 1986)		3:28
8.	"Jane Says"		4:52
9.	"No One's Leaving" (Live at Hollywood Palladium, 1990)		3:16
10.	"Ain't No Right" (Live at Hollywood Palladium, 1990)		3:09
Total length:			42:29

== Track sources ==
- Tracks 1–2 were originally released as b-sides to "Been Caught Stealing".
- Track 3 was originally released as a b-side to "Been Caught Stealing" and "Classic Girl".
- Track 4 was originally released on The Shocking EP.
- Tracks 5–6 is simply the Ritual de lo Habitual album version of "Three Days" separated over two tracks (plays seamlessly), as released on the 7" single.
- Track 7 originally appeared as a b-side to "Three Days" and "Stop!".
- Track 8 is mislabeled on the packaging as being a "Demo" when it is, in fact, simply the Nothing's Shocking studio album version. The track appears as a b-side on the "Three Days/Stop!" single and is mislabeled there, as well.
- Tracks 9–10 were originally released as b-sides to "Classic Girl". Track 10, "Ain't No Right (live)," also appears in extended, remastered form on the Kettle Whistle album.
