= Kettle Whistle =

Compilation album by Jane's Addiction
- Released: November 4, 1997
- Recorded: 1986 – August 1997
- Genre: Alternative rock
- Length: 74:27
- Label: Warner Bros.
- Producer: Jane's Addiction

Jane's Addiction chronology
Live and Rare (1991)	Kettle Whistle (1997)	Strays (2003)

Professional ratings
Review scores
Source	Rating
AllMusic	3/5 stars
Chicago Tribune	2/4 stars
Entertainment Weekly	B−
NME	6/10
Pitchfork	6.8/10
Robert Christgau	C+
Rolling Stone	3/5 stars
USA Today	3/4 stars

Kettle Whistle is a compilation album by alternative rock band Jane's Addiction, released November 4, 1997, on Warner Bros. Issued to coincide with the 1997 "Relapse" tour, the album – originally titled It's My Party – includes new, alternate, unreleased and live tracks.

Certified gold in the U.S., for sales in excess of 500,000, Kettle Whistle is the only Jane's release to feature Flea on bass guitar, though he played trumpet as a guest on their album Nothing's Shocking. The liner notes feature an anecdotal article on the band by Henry Rollins.

== Background ==
When asked about the material on the album in a November 1997 Guitar World interview, guitarist Dave Navarro stated, "Almost all of it was chosen by [drummer] Stephen [Perkins] who is, like, the Jane’s Addiction archivist. He basically has every demo tape and every board tape from every show. He put together what he thought was a nice, well-rounded ensemble of live stuff, studio outtakes, remixes, demos and things that never made it to record. At this moment, some of it’s still open to debate. Given the amount of material, I don’t think the three of us are ever going to be totally in agreement about every single cut. But I feel proud of and stand behind every piece of music that we made."

== Track listing ==
All tracks are written by Perry Farrell, Dave Navarro, Eric Avery and Stephen Perkins, except where noted. Songs are new, album-exclusive recordings except where noted.

No.	Title	Writer(s)	Length
1.	"Kettle Whistle"	Perry Farrell, Dave Navarro, Stephen Perkins, Flea	7:47
2.	"Ocean Size" (Nothing's Shocking Demo, 1988)		4:31
3.	"My Cat's Name Is Maceo" (Out-take, 1987 - Add'l recording 1997)		4:23
4.	"Had a Dad" (Nothing's Shocking Out-take, 1988)		3:45
5.	"So What!"	Perry Farrell, Dave Navarro, Stephen Perkins, Flea	4:41
6.	"Jane Says" (Live at Irvine Meadows, 1991)		6:31
7.	"Mountain Song" (Dudes Soundtrack, 1986)		4:08
8.	"Slow Divers" (Jane's Addiction Out-take, 1987 (Live) - Add'l recording 1997)		4:35
9.	"Three Days" (Live at Hollywood Palladium, 1990)		12:06
10.	"Ain't No Right" (Live at Hollywood Palladium, 1990)		3:23
11.	"Up the Beach" (Live at Hollywood Palladium, 1990)		3:20
12.	"Stop!" (Live at Hollywood Palladium, 1990)		4:23
13.	"Been Caught Stealing" (Ritual de lo habitual Out-take, 1989)		4:20
14.	"Whores" (Live at the Pyramid, 1986)		3:58
15.	"City" (Soul Kiss, 1988)		2:30
Total length:			74:27

== Track information ==
- "Kettle Whistle" was performed by the band in the late 1980s, and never recorded. The "Relapse" line-up of the band recorded the song in August of that year at Mount Mehru Studios in Venice, CA. This studio is owned by Farrell and Perkins' former band Porno for Pyros.
- The version of "Ocean Size" included on this compilation is a demo the band recorded to show their producing abilities to Warner Bros. The track was recorded at Capitol Records Studios in 1988.
- "My Cat's Name Is Maceo" is about Farrell's cat and was recorded in 1987 at Hully Gully Studios in Los Angeles with Maceo Parker guesting on alto sax.
- The version of "Had a Dad" included was originally intended for Nothing's Shocking but was rejected by Warner Bros.
- "So What!" is a new song recorded by the "Relapse" line-up.
- The live version of "Jane Says" is from the first Lollapalooza, which was also the final tour before the band's initial breakup in 1991.
- The version of "Mountain Song" that appears here originally appeared on the soundtrack for the film Dudes and was used to get the band signed to XXX Records.
- "Slow Divers" was the opening track for the live show which was used as the basis for the band's debut album, Jane's Addiction.
- "City", as it appears on this album, was played only by Farrell and Navarro. According to the liner notes, the other half of the band were lost in traffic at the time.

== Personnel ==
Jane's Addiction

- Perry Farrell – lead vocals (all tracks)
- Dave Navarro – guitar (all tracks)
- Eric Avery – bass guitar on 2–4, 6–7, 9–14
- Flea – bass guitar on 1, 5, 8; trumpet on 5
- Stephen Perkins – drums (all tracks)

Additional musicians

- Maceo Parker – saxophone on 3
- Dave Fridmann – keyboards on 5
- Christine Cagle – backing vocals on 5

== Charts ==
Chart (1997)	Peak position
Australian Albums (ARIA)	64
Canada Top Albums/CDs (RPM)	42
New Zealand Albums (RMNZ)	23
Norwegian Albums (VG-lista)	40
UK Albums (OCC)	199
US Billboard 200	21

== Certifications ==
Region	Certification	Certified units/sales
United States (RIAA)	Gold	500,000^{^}
^{^} Shipments figures based on certification alone.
