= Gift (1993 film) =

1993 docudrama by Perry Farrell and Casey Niccoli

Gift is a 1993 experimental docudrama made by Perry Farrell and his then-girlfriend, Casey Niccoli. The film prominently features Farrell's band Jane's Addiction.

== Production ==
Though released in 1993, the majority of filming took place three years earlier during the recording sessions of Ritual de lo Habitual in 1990.

The film was edited by Eric Zumbrunnen and Niccoli.

== Release ==
Gift premiered to a limited audience on February 19, 1993, more than 18 months after Jane's Addiction officially dissolved, and was released to VHS by Warner Brothers on August 24, 1993. A laserdisc version was released in Japan, which features Japanese subtitles and obligatory censorship of visible genitalia. The film has achieved cult status among Jane's Addiction fans.

== Music ==
The following Jane's Addiction songs are featured in the soundtrack:

- "Ain't No Right"
- "Classic Girl"
- "Of Course"
- "Stop!"
- "Three Days"

Rapper Ice-T, Body Count, and Jane's Addiction performed Sly and the Family Stone's "Don't Call Me Nigger, Whitey" in the film.

== See also ==
- Gothic rock
