= Classic Girl =

Single by Jane's Addiction

from the album Ritual de lo Habitual
- Released: July 17, 1991
- Genre: Alternative rock
- Length: 5:07
- Label: Warner Bros.
- Songwriter(s): Perry Farrell, Dave Navarro
- Producer(s): Dave Jerden, Perry Farrell

Jane's Addiction singles chronology
"Been Caught Stealing" (1990)	"Classic Girl" (1991)	"Ripple" (1991)

Music video
- "Classic Girl" on YouTube

"Classic Girl" is a song by alternative rock band Jane's Addiction, released on their 1990 album, Ritual de lo Habitual. It is the closing track of that album. The song's lyrics talk of a "classic girl" - a girl who is easily admired for her prototypical feminine beauty - and the time shared by the narrator and the girl.

== Composition ==
The song is in the key of A Major and has a tempo of 113 BPM. For the majority of the song, a mellow, reminiscent mood is maintained, however at two points in the song the speed of the song increases, representing the jubilation in the relationship.

== Music video ==
A music video was released for "Classic Girl", that featured clips from the film Gift, directed by and starring frontman Perry Farrell and his then-girlfriend and muse, Casey Niccoli. Gift would eventually be released in 1993. The main scene shown in the video is a Santería-style wedding ceremony between Farrell and Niccoli.

== Track listing ==
1. "Then She Did..." - 8:20
2. "No One's Leaving (live)" - 3:22
3. "Ain't No Right (live)" - 3:22
4. "L.A. Medley (live)" - 3:46
  - L.A. Woman (Jim Morrison, Robbie Krieger, Ray Manzarek, John Densmore)
  - Nausea (John Doe, Exene Cervenka)
  - Lexicon Devil (Darby Crash, Pat Smear)
5. "Classic Girl" - 5:07

another version

1. "Classic Girl" - 5:07
2. "No One's Leaving (live)" - 3:22
3. "Ain't No Right (live)" - 3:22

== Chart positions ==
Chart (1991)	Peak Position
US Alternative Airplay (Billboard)	15
