= Mountain Song (Jane's Addiction song) =

1988 single by Jane's Addiction

Single by Jane's Addiction

from the album Nothing's Shocking
- B-side: "Standing in the Shower...Thinking"
- Released: 1988
- Genre: Alternative rock; hard rock
- Length: 4:03
- Label: Warner Bros.
- Songwriters: Perry Farrell; Eric Avery
- Producers: Dave Jerden; Perry Farrell

Jane's Addiction singles chronology
"Jane Says" (1988)	"Mountain Song" (1988)	"Stop!" (1990)

"Mountain Song" is a song by American rock band Jane's Addiction. It was released as the only single from their debut studio album, Nothing's Shocking (1988). While not as successful as the promotional single, "Jane Says", and failing to chart, the song is now regarded as one of the great anthems of alternative rock.

== Recording ==
"Mountain Song" was the first song written by the band. It was written in 1985, before a band name had even been decided upon. An early recorded version of the song appears on the soundtrack for the American independent film, Dudes (1987), starring Jon Cryer. This version can also be found on the band's 1997 compilation album, Kettle Whistle. The song was re-recorded for Nothing's Shocking.

== Release ==
The single, first released in 1988, features only the Nothing's Shocking version and not the original one. The B-side, "Standing in the Shower... Thinking", was also taken from the album. The single was re-released on April 18, 2009, to help promote the Jane's Addiction box set, A Cabinet of Curiosities, released the same month. The packaging was generally the same but contained several inserts promoting the box set and the band's albums.

== Music videos ==
There are two different music videos for this song. The second video, directed by Perry Farrell, with live footage directed by Modi Frank, exists in three different versions: the original, the original censored for MTV, and Modi Frank's director's cut. Footage for this video was shot at the Scream in Hollywood, on August 19, 1988. Banned from MTV because of nudity, a censored version, which puts black bars and shapes over Perry Farrell and Casey Niccoli's genitals, was created. MTV agreed to air it on Headbangers Ball and 120 Minutes. As a means to make the official, unedited version available to fans, Jane's Addiction released the "videomentary" Soul Kiss on Valentine's Day 1989. In addition to the "Mountain Song" video, the VHS also features footage of the band performing comedic sketches and footage of the band performing a song called "City", which would not appear on an album until the 1997's compilation album, Kettle Whistle.

The first video for the song was created without the band's knowledge, involvement or input, by Andrew Doucette, in September 1988, from existing performance footage provided to him by Warner Bros. Records. As the band disliked it, it was shelved and the second video was made. The first video also features some of the footage shot at the Scream. It is this video that was primarily shown in Europe and Australia. Excerpts of the video were included in an episode of Beavis and Butt-Head.

== Track listing ==
No.	Title	Length
1.	"Mountain Song" (Nothing's Shocking version)	4:03
2.	"Standing in the Shower... Thinking"	3:03
