= Help Wanted (Eric Avery album) =

Studio album by Eric Avery
- Released: April 8, 2008
- Recorded: 2006 – 2007
- Genre: Alternative rock
- Length: 50:05
- Label: Dangerbird Records
- Producer: Billy Bush

Eric Avery chronology
Help Wanted (2008)	LIFE.TIME. (2013)

Professional ratings
Review scores
Source	Rating
Allmusic	link
Blog Critics Magazine	(not rated)
Reax Music Magazine	5/5 stars
Tiny Mix Tapes	link

Help Wanted is the debut solo album release from Jane's Addiction bassist, Eric Avery, released on April 8, 2008, just ahead of his first return to the band.

A number of notable guest musicians perform on the record, including Foo Fighters' Taylor Hawkins, Garbage's Shirley Manson, and Red Hot Chili Peppers bassist and trumpeter Flea and trumpeter Willie Waldman. Harold Barefoot Sanders III, who collaborated with Eric in his band Polar Bear, also contributes on a few tracks. Lastly, Chris Chaney, longtime replacement bassist of Jane's Addiction, plays on a song along with his bandmate of The Coattail Riders.

A music video was created for the song "All Remote And No Control" which can be viewed at IGN.

Fishpork ranked it #5 of the year for 2008.

== Track listing ==
1. "Belly of an Insect" – 4:24
2. "Beside the Fire" – 3:32
3. "All Remote and No Control" – 4:03
4. "Revolution" – 4:22
5. "Maybe" – 4:26
6. "Unexploded" – 3:55
7. "Walk through Walls (The Man Who Can Fly Pt. 5)" – 4:37
8. "Philo Beddoe" – 4:09
9. "Chicken Bone (The Man Who Can Fly Pt. 2)" – 3:40
10. "Porchlight" – 3:48
11. "Song in the Silence (The Man Who Can Fly Pt. 7)" – 4:35
12. "Sun’s Gone" – 4:28

== Personnel ==
- Jason Orme – guitar (1, 9)
- Chris McClure – guitar (2), backing vocal (4)
- Christian Stone – guitar (2)
- Eamon Ryland – guitar (2)
- David Levita – guitar (3, 5, 7, 10, 11), Marxophone (7)
- Mark Pritchard – guitar (8)
- Zane Smythe – guitar (11)
- Harold Barefoot Sanders III – synthesizer (3), drum sampling, bits and synth (12)
- Jonathan Larroquette – synthesizer (6)
- Adam Somers – modular synthesizer (6)
- Zac Rae – keyboards (7, 11), Wurly (10)
- Taylor Hawkins – drums (1, 3, 6–8)
- Matt Tecu – drums (10, 11)
- Kirsten Gottschalk – backing vocal (3)
- Shirley Manson – lyric co-writing and vocal (5)
- Chris Chaney – bass (7)
- Flea – main horn (11)
- Willie Waldman – outro horn (11)
