= Been Caught Stealing =

Single by Jane's Addiction

from the album Ritual de lo Habitual
- B-side: "Had a Dad" (Radio Tokyo Demo)
- Released: November 15, 1990
- Recorded: 1989–1990
- Genre: Alternative rock; funk rock
- Length: 3:34
- Label: Warner Bros.
- Songwriters: Eric Avery; Perry Farrell
- Producers: Dave Jerden; Perry Farrell

Jane's Addiction singles chronology
"Three Days" (1990)	"Been Caught Stealing" (1990)	"Classic Girl" (1991)

Music video
- "Been Caught Stealing" on YouTube

"Been Caught Stealing" is a song by American rock band Jane's Addiction, released in November 1990 by Warner Bros. as the third single from the band's second album, Ritual de lo Habitual (1990). The song is also the band's biggest hit, spending four weeks at No. 1 on the US Billboard Modern Rock chart. Different versions appear on the compilations Kettle Whistle, Up from the Catacombs – The Best of Jane's Addiction and Rev. Casey Niccoli directed the accompanying music video, which humorously depicts people shoplifting at a grocery store in Venice, California.

The tune later appeared in the 2004 video game Grand Theft Auto: San Andreas on the fictional in-game radio station "Radio X".

Among its highlights are what Rolling Stone dubbed "the best use of dog barks since Pet Sounds". "That was Annie", recalled singer Perry Farrell. "I'd got her from a dog shelter and she was quite needy, so I brought her down to the studio that day rather than leave her at home… I'm singing in the booth with the headphones on and Annie gets all excited and starts going, 'Ruff! Ruff! Ruff!'… The fact that she ended up on the track was just pure coincidence."

== Critical reception ==
Greg Prato from AllMusic named the song a "cheerful ditty". J.D. Considine from The Baltimore Sun found that the "loping groove and whirlpool guitars" of songs like "Been Caught Stealing", "are enough to suggest that Jane's Addiction may yet rewrite the book on hard rock." Larry Flick from Billboard magazine wrote, "After a long and impressive reign at modern rock radio, cut from acclaimed band's current set is well-poised to click at top 40. Trippy psychedelic rave-fueled with nifty acoustic and electric guitar trade-offs-kicks hard but doesn't risk intimidating weak-at-heart mainstreamers." The Daily Vault's Christopher Thelen stated that this is "the song that will probably define Jane's Addiction for the remainder of time."

Simon Reynolds from Melody Maker said it, "by some uncanny and presumably innocent coincidence, hits upon a near-identical groove to Happy Mondays' "Wrote for Luck": its funk undercarriage is almost baggy." Another Melody Maker editor, Chris Roberts, named it "another cut from the riotous Ritual LP, still weird and wild and winging its way through Farrell's fantastical prayers. Withdrawal is not advised." John Lannert from Sun Sentinel described the song as "psychedelic hip-hop". Craig S. Semon from Telegram & Gazette named it the "standout" of the album and "rock 'n' roll's definitive pro-shoplifting song." He added, "From its inspired use of dogs barking and hands clapping, this song is a gem. Farrell's commanding vocals, Navarro's choppy rhythms and the song's engaging brassiness creates a strong interplay for this truly distorted vision. The lines "When we want something, we don't want to pay for it. We walk right through the door", emphasises this offbeat bohemian view of survival."

== Music video ==
The song's accompanying music video humorously depicted people (including the band members) shoplifting at a Venice California grocery store. The video was directed by Casey Niccoli, who was Farrell's creative co-partner for Jane's Addiction's early aesthetics. It was voted No. 47 on VH1's 100 Greatest Videos. The video was listed as No. 17 on Rolling Stone's 100 top music videos.

== Awards and accolades ==
German magazine Spex included "Been Caught Stealing" in their "The Best Singles of the Century" list in 1999.

The song is featured on The Rock and Roll Hall of Fame's 500 Songs that Shaped Rock and Roll; the list has no particular ranking.

It was chosen by Alice Cooper as one of his eight selections on the UK radio program Desert Island Discs.

The music video won Best Alternative Video at the 1991 MTV Video Music Awards. It also won the 1991 Foundations Forum Award for Best Video (Single Cut), tying with Slayer's "Seasons in the Abyss."

In September 2023, for the 35th anniversary of Modern Rock Tracks (by which time it had been renamed to Alternative Airplay), Billboard ranked "Been Caught Stealing" at number 62 on its list of the 100 most successful songs in the chart's history.

== Track listing ==
No.	Title	Length
1.	"Been Caught Stealing" (12" Remix Version)	4:23
2.	"Been Caught Stealing" (Album Version)	3:34
3.	"Had a Dad" (Demo)	3:52

== Charts ==
Chart (1990)	Peak position
Australia (ARIA)	56
Ireland (IRMA)	24
UK Singles (OCC)	34
US Alternative Songs (Billboard)	1
US Hot Mainstream Rock Tracks (Billboard)	29

== See also ==
- Number one modern rock hits of 1990
