= Jane Says =

Promotional single by Jane's Addiction

from the album Nothing's Shocking and Kettle Whistle
- Released: August 23, 1988
- Recorded: 1987–1988
- Genre: Alternative rock; psychedelic rock
- Length: 4:52
- Label: Warner Bros.
- Songwriters: Eric Avery, Perry Farrell
- Producers: Dave Jerden, Perry Farrell

Jane's Addiction singles chronology
| "Jane Says" (1988) | "Mountain Song" (1988) |

Music video
- "Jane Says" on YouTube

"Jane Says" is a song by American rock band Jane's Addiction, released in 1988 as a promotional single from their debut studio album Nothing's Shocking. It became the band's first chart entry on the Alternative Songs chart, peaking at #6. It is one of Jane's Addiction's most famous songs and frequently ends their concerts.

== Background ==
The song was first released in 1987 on the band's debut live album Jane's Addiction, but was re-recorded for their debut studio album, Nothing's Shocking (1988). This version is the most well known and was released as a promotional single, featuring steel drums not present in the original. A true live version was included in 1997 on the compilation album Kettle Whistle.

== Composition ==
"Jane Says" uses only two chords for most of the song. The original recording from Jane's Addiction features bongos and is sung in a lower register than later versions. The version that appears on Nothing's Shocking makes extensive use of steel drums played by Stephen Perkins in place of the original's bongos. The live version from Kettle Whistle interpolates the two versions, opening with an extended bongo introduction, over Perry Ferrell's scat vocals, before abruptly shifting to steel drum one measure before starting the verse.

The song format does not follow standard verse–chorus form, instead featuring three verses and a bridge section, following a traditional AABA form. Each verse ends with a short refrain ("I'm gonna kick tomorrow...") repeated twice. The song concludes on a coda consisting of a repeat of the bridge.

== Jane Bainter ==
The title refers to lead singer Perry Farrell's ex-housemate, Jane Bainter, who was the muse, inspiration, and the namesake of the band. In a 2001 interview with the Los Angeles Times, Bainter confirmed and clarified many things about the song; she was dating an abusive man named Sergio and she did wear wigs, but stated she never sold her body for sex. In the same interview, Bainter said she had been clean for eight years and did eventually get to go to Spain.

== Track listing ==
1988 promo single
| No. | Title | Length |
|---|---|---|
| 1. | "Jane Says" (LP Version) | 4:52 |

1997 promo single
| No. | Title | Length |
|---|---|---|
| 1. | "Jane Says" (Live Edit) | 5:05 |
| 2. | "Jane Says" (Live Album Version) | 5:58 |

== Charts ==
Nothing's Shocking version

| Chart (1988) | Peak position |
|---|---|
| US Alternative Airplay (Billboard) | 6 |

Kettle Whistle version

| Chart (1998) | Peak position |
|---|---|
| US Alternative Airplay (Billboard) | 25 |
| US Active Rock (Billboard) | 28 |
| US Mainstream Rock (Billboard) | 37 |

== Certifications ==
| Region | Certification | Certified units/sales |
|---|---|---|
| New Zealand (RMNZ) | Gold | 15,000^{‡} |
^{‡} Sales+streaming figures based on certification alone.
