= Deconstruction (band) =

American alternative rock band (1993–1994)

- Origin: Los Angeles, California, U.S.
- Genres: Alternative rock
- Years active: 1993–1994
- Label: American
- Spinoff of: Jane's Addiction
- Past members: Dave Navarro; Eric Avery; Michael Murphy

Deconstruction was an American alternative rock band formed by bassist/singer Eric Avery and guitarist Dave Navarro, both formerly of Jane's Addiction, with drummer Michael Murphy. They released their sole album in 1994.

== History ==
Following the initial breakup of Jane's Addiction in 1991, Avery and Navarro formed Deconstruction as a one-time project. They had initially invited Jane's Addiction drummer Stephen Perkins to join the project, but Perkins decided to join Porno for Pyros instead. Michael Murphy was recruited for the Deconstruction project.

The band released the album Deconstruction in 1994; it did not sell well and earned mixed reviews from critics. A video was produced for the track "L.A. Song". The band never toured because Avery was uninterested in doing so after the stress of his years with Jane's Addiction. In his biography, Navarro described Deconstruction as "more of an artistic experiment than anything else. We didn't have songs; some people viewed us as geniuses and others viewed us as fools. And, personally, I could see the rationale behind both points of view very clearly."

Deconstruction disbanded shortly after the release of the album. Avery then formed the band Polar Bear, while Navarro joined Red Hot Chili Peppers.

== Discography ==
- Deconstruction (1994)
