= Nothing's Shocking =

Studio album by Jane's Addiction
- Released: August 23, 1988
- Recorded: 1987–1988
- Studios: Eldorado, Los Angeles
- Genres: Alternative rock; alternative metal; hard rock; art rock; progressive rock
- Length: 45:13
- Label: Warner Bros.
- Producers: Dave Jerden; Perry Farrell

Jane's Addiction chronology
Jane's Addiction (1987)	Nothing's Shocking (1988)	Ritual de lo Habitual (1990)

Singles from Nothing's Shocking
- 1. "Jane Says" Released: August 23, 1988; 2. "Mountain Song" Released: December 1988

Nothing's Shocking is the debut studio album by the American rock band Jane's Addiction, released on August 23, 1988 through Warner Bros. Records. The album was preceded by the band's eponymous live debut album.

Nothing's Shocking was well received by critics and peaked at number 103 on the Billboard 200, eventually being certified platinum by the RIAA. The single "Jane Says" reached number six on the Billboard Modern Rock Tracks in 1988. It received a nomination for the 31st Grammy Awards in the category for Best Hard Rock/Metal Performance Vocal or Instrumental, ultimately losing to Jethro Tull's Crest of a Knave.

Since its release, the album has continued to receive widespread acclaim and is now regarded as one of the most important alternative rock albums of all time and one of the greatest albums of the 1980s. Rolling Stone ranked Nothing's Shocking at number 312 on its "500 Greatest Albums of All Time", and it frequently appeared on "best album" lists of the 1980s.

The album was subject to censorship due to its cover and the music video for the second single, "Mountain Song".

== Background ==
Jane's Addiction was formed in 1985 in Los Angeles by singer Perry Farrell and bassist Eric Avery. After going through multiple drummers and guitarists, they eventually recruited guitarist Dave Navarro and drummer Stephen Perkins.

Jane's Addiction became a sensation on the Los Angeles club scene, primarily headlining at Scream, and won interest from a variety of record labels. While the group decided to sign with Warner Bros. Records, they insisted on releasing their debut on independent record label Triple X Records first. The band's manager negotiated the largest advance up to that point, with Warner Bros. signing the band for between $250,000 to $300,000. In January 1987, the band recorded its debut, Jane's Addiction, during a performance at the Roxy Theatre, at a cost of $4,000. Before the album's release, Jane's Addiction supported British band Love and Rockets on a two-month tour in late 1987. In late 1987, the band opened for former Bauhaus vocalist Peter Murphy at the now demolished Fender's Ballroom in Long Beach, before entering the studio to record their debut studio album, Nothing's Shocking, in January 1988.

== Recording ==
Warner Bros. Records gave Jane's Addiction a list of producers to choose from. The band's frontman, Perry Farrell, appreciated Dave Jerden's work as engineer on David Byrne and Brian Eno's album, My Life in the Bush of Ghosts. Jerden said he "jumped" at the chance to work with the group. "I had a demo tape of 18 songs," Jerden recalled, "and I listened to it every night all summer. I picked nine songs from the tape and put them in an order. And then I said to the band, 'Let's do these nine songs. You'll rehearse them in this order, and we'll record them in this order.' And that's what we did."

During the recording sessions, Farrell stated he wanted 50% of the band's publishing royalties for writing the lyrics, plus a quarter of the remaining half for writing music, adding up to 62.5%. Bassist Eric Avery said he and the other members – guitarist Dave Navarro and drummer Stephen Perkins – were stunned by these demands. One day, Jerden drove to the studio to find Farrell, Navarro, and Perkins leaving; Farrell told him the band had broken up and there would be no record. Warner Bros. called an emergency meeting to resolve the situation. Farrell received the percentage he sought, and the other members received 12.5% each. Avery said the incident had a profound effect on the band, creating an internal fracture.

Not long after the royalties dispute, Farrell and Avery – who had cofounded the band – had a falling out. This was the result of Avery's newfound sobriety as well as an incident in which Farrell believed Avery had drunkenly tried to pick up his girlfriend. "Unfortunately," Farrell recalled, "the tensions between Eric and I affected the whole family. Some people were asked to take sides, and others just moped about because they didn't know what was going on." Perkins, however, is reported to have got along with Navarro, Avery, and Farrell.

== Music ==
The writing process varied from song to song. "Some came from Eric's bass lines," noted Navarro, "some from guitar, some came from Perry, some came from drum riffs, and some just came from free-form jams. There was really no formula." Avery wrote several songs, including "Mountain Song", "Had a Dad", "Jane Says", and "Summertime Rolls" (the latter two of which he also created the guitar parts for). For his songs, Avery came up with lyrical concepts that Perry Farrell would create lyrics for; for example, "Had a Dad" dealt with Avery discovering he had a different biological father.

"Jane Says" and "Pigs in Zen", which first appeared on the band's self-titled 1987 debut, were rerecorded for Nothing's Shocking. The later version of "Jane Says" features a steel drum while the spoken interlude in "Pigs in Zen" is completely different.

"Mountain Song" – originally released in 1987 on the soundtrack for the film Dudes – was also rerecorded. Musically similar to the original, it is sung in a higher key, to be consistent with the rest of the record. The 1987 original saw a more widespread release when it was included on the band's 1997 outtake/alternate/live and new compilation Kettle Whistle.

Red Hot Chili Peppers bassist Flea played trumpet on "Idiots Rule".

== Packaging ==
Farrell and his then girlfriend Casey Niccoli created the cover image, which features a sculpture of nude female conjoined twins on a rocking chair with their heads on fire. He initially hired Warner Bros. employees to create the sculpture, but – after learning how to create sculptures by watching them closely – fired them and created the artwork himself. "The idea came from a dream I had," he recalled. "There were these two women swinging back and forth. They were joined at the hip and shoulder, and their hair was on fire. I just went from there, and Casey assisted me. We had a fellow come and do a plaster body-casting of her, then we made the twins' hair and head gear from pipe cleaners. You'll notice the chair rocks from side to side, as opposed to back and forth, so we had to have that made specially. We also went shopping for fake eyeballs."

Owing to the cover, nine of the eleven leading record store chains refused to carry Nothing's Shocking. It was issued covered with brown paper.

== Release ==
Nothing's Shocking was released on August 23, 1988. Three singles were released to support the album: "Jane Says", "Mountain Song", and "Ocean Size." "Mountain Song" and Ocean Size" were both accompanied by music videos; however, MTV refused to air the former's video owing to a scene containing graphic nudity. Farrell decided to release the video commercially, adding twenty minutes of additional footage to create the Soul Kiss home video.

Lack of airplay on MTV and modern rock radio meant Nothing's Shocking sold only 200,000 to 250,000 copies in its first year of release. By 1998, it had been certified platinum by the Recording Industry Association of America for shipments of one million copies in the United States.

After the album's release, the band went on tour, opening for Iggy Pop and the Ramones. The tour helped bring attention to the band, who, by the end of the tour, were headlining clubs and theaters.

=== 2012 remaster ===
A remastered edition of Nothing's Shocking was released on June 19, 2012 on a 24-karat-gold disc. Produced by Audio Fidelity, the remaster had a limited production run of 5,000 units. Each pressing came individually numbered.

Other than the addition of remastering production credits and a cardboard slipcase over the standard jewel case, the liner notes and artwork are almost identical to the original release. Likewise, the track list remained unchanged. The most notable artwork difference between the original and the remaster is in the color of band name typeface on the cover: the original is rendered in a deep teal with black outline while the remaster features a light grey type with purple outline.

== Critical reception ==
Professional ratings
Review scores
Source	Rating
AllMusic	5/5 stars
Kerrang!	5/5
Los Angeles Times	3.5/4 stars
NME	7/10
The Philadelphia Inquirer	4/4 stars
Pitchfork	9.3/10
Q	4/5 stars
Rolling Stone	4/5 stars
The Rolling Stone Album Guide	4.5/5 stars
The Village Voice	B−

Reviewing Nothing's Shocking for Rolling Stone, Steve Pond praised Jane's Addiction as "the true heir to Led Zeppelin" and called the album "simultaneously forbidding and weighty, delicate and ethereal", while also distinctly more "hardheaded and realistic" in sensibility than Led Zeppelin's music. Los Angeles Times critic Richard Cromelin commented that Jane's Addiction "sounds supremely assured as it alternates its taut, brutal metal alloy with oddly endearing moments of reflection", describing their style as "a bracing throwback to rebellious sources and forces of excess like old Black Sabbath and Alice Cooper". Ken Tucker, writing for The Philadelphia Inquirer, found the album's lyrics incomprehensible in meaning, but viewed them as secondary to the music, which he deemed "first-rate – deceptively slapdash, passionately messy, thoroughly exhilarating." Kerrang!'s Phil Wilding hailed Jane's Addiction as "the second coming" and posited that their innovation would be "understood" over time, while Q's Martin Aston wrote that the band manages to recall acts such as Led Zeppelin and Van Halen without resorting to "the plagiarism that plagues the HM/hard rock genre." Jack Barron of NME credited Jane's Addiction for having "breadth" and concluded that they "come from a town ruled by glam where talent is only mascara deep, but this is no five-year-old's IQ on show here."

At the end of 1988, Nothing's Shocking was voted the 34th best album of the year in The Village Voice's Pazz & Jop critics' poll. The poll's curator, Robert Christgau, was lukewarm toward the record, summarizing Jane's Addiction as "Alice Cooper revisited" while conceding that "if they stick at it like the pros they'll be, they might land an 'Only Women Bleed.'"

== Legacy ==
In a retrospective review, AllMusic's Greg Prato called Nothing's Shocking a "now classic" album and "a must-have for lovers of cutting-edge, influential, and timeless hard rock." Steve Hochman, writing in the 2004 edition of The Rolling Stone Album Guide, regarded it as an "often stunning" work whose songs juxtapose "slinky Zeppelin thunder with personal/poetic imagery recalling Lou Reed." "Even with all the baggage of prophecy and influence," wrote Ian Cohen of Pitchfork, "Nothing's Shocking lives as a poignant, almost quixotic work of Hollywood imagination". Pitchfork listed it as one of the 1980s' best albums in 2002, ranking it 90th, and in 2018, ranking it 134th. In 2006, Q named it the 32nd-best album of the 1980s. Nothing's Shocking was ranked at number 312 on Rolling Stone's 2012 edition of its "500 Greatest Albums of All Time" list. In 2024, Loudwire staff elected it the best hard rock album of 1988.

"Nothing's Shocking influenced me a lot, especially with what Eric Avery proposed from the bass," said Nick Oliveri, founder of Kyuss and Mondo Generator and former member of Queens of the Stone Age. "Eric had written the music on his own, the guitars and the drums came later. So he inspired me on that side, it is very possible that they were the first really alternative band."

== Track listing ==
All lyrics are written by Perry Farrell; all music is composed by Jane's Addiction.

No.	Title	Length
1.	"Up the Beach"	3:00
2.	"Ocean Size"	4:20
3.	"Had a Dad"	3:44
4.	"Ted, Just Admit It..."	7:23
5.	"Standing in the Shower... Thinking"	3:03
6.	"Summertime Rolls"	6:18
7.	"Mountain Song"	4:03
8.	"Idiots Rule"	3:00
9.	"Jane Says"	4:52
10.	"Thank You Boys"	1:01
11.	"Pigs in Zen" (not on vinyl edition)	4:30

== Personnel ==
Jane's Addiction

- Perry Farrell – vocals, piano
- Dave Navarro – electric and acoustic guitars
- Eric Avery – bass guitar, acoustic guitar
- Stephen Perkins – drums, percussion

Additional musicians

- Angelo Moore – saxophone on "Idiots Rule"
- Flea – trumpet on "Idiots Rule"
- Christopher Dowd – trombone on "Idiots Rule"

Recording personnel

- Dave Jerden – production, mixing, and recording engineer
- Perry Farrell – production, mixing
- Ronnie S. Champagne – recording engineer
- Andy Harper – recording engineer
- Jeff Piergeorge – second recording engineer
- Steve Hall – mastering (original album)
- Kevin Gray – mastering (2012 remastered album)

Additional personnel

- Perry Farrell – album design, sculpture and photography
- Casey Niccoli – art assistant, photography
- Kevin Westenberg – band photography
- Kim Champagne – art hostess
- Paul Fisher – castings
- Roberta Ballard – production coordinator (2012 remastered album)

== Charts ==
Chart (1988)	Peak position
Australian Albums (ARIA)	157
US Billboard 200	103

== Certifications ==
Region	Certification	Certified units/sales
Australia (ARIA)	Gold	35,000^{^}
United Kingdom (BPI)	Silver	60,000^{^}
United States (RIAA)	Platinum	1,000,000^{^}
^{^} Shipments figures based on certification alone.

== Bibliography ==
- Mullen, Brendan (2005). Whores: An Oral Biography of Perry Farrell and Jane's Addiction. Da Capo Press. ISBN 0-306-81347-5.
