= Deconstruction (Deconstruction album) =

Studio album by Deconstruction
- Released: July 12, 1994
- Recorded: 1993–1994
- Genre: Alternative rock; experimental rock
- Length: 71:13
- Label: American
- Producer: Deconstruction; Ron Champagne

Professional ratings
Review scores
Source	Rating
AllMusic	2.5/5 stars

Deconstruction is the only studio album by American alternative rock band Deconstruction. It was released on July 12, 1994, through American Recordings. The album charted at number 31 on the Billboard Heatseekers album chart. Deconstruction disbanded shortly after the release of the album, with Eric Avery forming the band Polar Bear and Dave Navarro joining Red Hot Chili Peppers. The pair would later reunite as bandmates in Jane's Addiction in 2008.

== Background ==
Deconstruction was formed following the breakup of Jane's Addiction in 1991 by bassist Eric Avery and guitarist Dave Navarro, along with drummer Michael Murphy. In his biography, Navarro described the band as "more of an artistic experiment than anything else." Every track on Deconstruction with the exception of "L.A. Song" and "Dirge" were written by Avery, Navarro and Murphy, while all lyrics were written by Avery. The band produced the album along with Ron Champagne and executive producer Rick Rubin.

== Critical reception ==
Critics gave the album largely mixed reviews, often while comparing Deconstruction to its predecessor Jane's Addiction. Trouser Press wrote that "while Deconstruction can claim a few decent songs and Dave Navarro’s dazzling guitar work, the album is ruined by utterly toneless vocals — both Navarro and bassist Eric Avery are credited, but whomever is doing the singing makes former bandmate Perry Farrell sound like Pavarotti." Exclaim! wrote: "Deconstruction is an ethereal and evolving affair, containing both Eric and Dave's stringed histrionics and ever-morphing jams, yet again lacks the edge of Jane's Addiction, and meanders when it should rock, almost to the point of being lackadaisical."

AllMusic considered the album to be an experiment bridging Jane's Addiction and whatever Avery and Navarro might do next, and concluded that the album is a "springboard for more, certainly, but not a final product." The most positive review came from PopMatters, which called the album "terribly underrated."

== Track listing ==
All tracks are written by Dave Navarro, Eric Avery and Michael Murphy, except where noted.

No.	Title	Music	Length
1.	"L.A. Song"	Bob Spickard, Brian Carman, Navarro, Avery and Murphy	6:02
2.	"Single"		6:45
3.	"Get at 'Em"		4:29
4.	"Iris"		4:40
5.	"Dirge"	Navarro, Avery, Murphy and Ron Champagne	5:53
6.	"Fire in the Hole"		5:52
7.	"Son"		3:07
8.	"Big Sur"		5:41
9.	"Hope"		3:49
10.	"One"		5:32
11.	"America"		7:02
12.	"Sleepyhead"		3:09
13.	"Wait for History"		6:03
14.	"That Is All"		1:10
15.	"Kilo"		2:09
Total length:			71:13

== Personnel ==
- Eric Avery – bass, vocals, lyrics
- Dave Navarro – guitars, vocals
- Michael Murphy – drums
- Gibby Haynes – vocals on "Get at 'Em" and "Fire in the Hole"
- Ron Champagne – producer, mixer, mastering
- Matthew Ellard – engineer
- Eddie Schreyer – mastering
- Kristina Champagne – coordinator
- Rick Rubin – executive producer
- Martin Atkyns – art direction, design
- Dirk Walter – design
- Amadeo – photographer
