= Geoff Stradling =

American jazz musician

- Born: May 19, 1955 (age 71); Bellingham, Washington, US
- Website: geoffstradling.com

Geoff Stradling (born May 19, 1955 in Bellingham, Washington) is an American pianist, keyboardist, composer, arranger and orchestrator. He has recorded with Ernestine Anderson (including the Grammy-nominated CDs Blues, Dues and Love News and Now And Then), Ladd McIntosh, Kenny Goldberg, Joe Gallardo, and Jane's Addiction on Ritual de lo Habitual.

He is a jazz composer, having won the International Association for Jazz Education (IAJE) national composition contest in 1974 with his composition "The Great White Also", a literary reference to H. Allen Smith, published by the C. L. Barnhouse Company. Two of his newer works are featured on the Wayne Bergeron CD entitled Plays Well With Others: "Samba Brassiliero", and "Scheherazade", a re-working of the third movement of Nikolai Rimsky-Korsakov's work.

Stradling's music has been featured in films, commercials and on television, most notably in the feature film Ray of Sunshine and on Entertainment Tonight (compositions), the American Music Awards (compositions and arrangements), and in the films Flushed Away, The Number 23 and Shrek the Third (orchestrations).

His debut CD as a leader Les Is Mo' was released on January 16, 2007 on Origin Records.

As a pianist and/or keyboardist he has performed with Quincy Jones, Mel Tormé, Sammy Davis Jr., Diane Schuur, Torsten de Winkel, The Banda Brothers, Rubin Estrada, Line Renaud, and Sue Raney.

In the late 1970s and early 1980s Stradling worked as a studio musician in Europe and played on many successful pop records. During this time he was the featured piano player on the Italian Disco hit "One For You, One For me" in 1978 by La Bionda.
