= List of Billboard Modern Rock Tracks number ones of the 1990s =

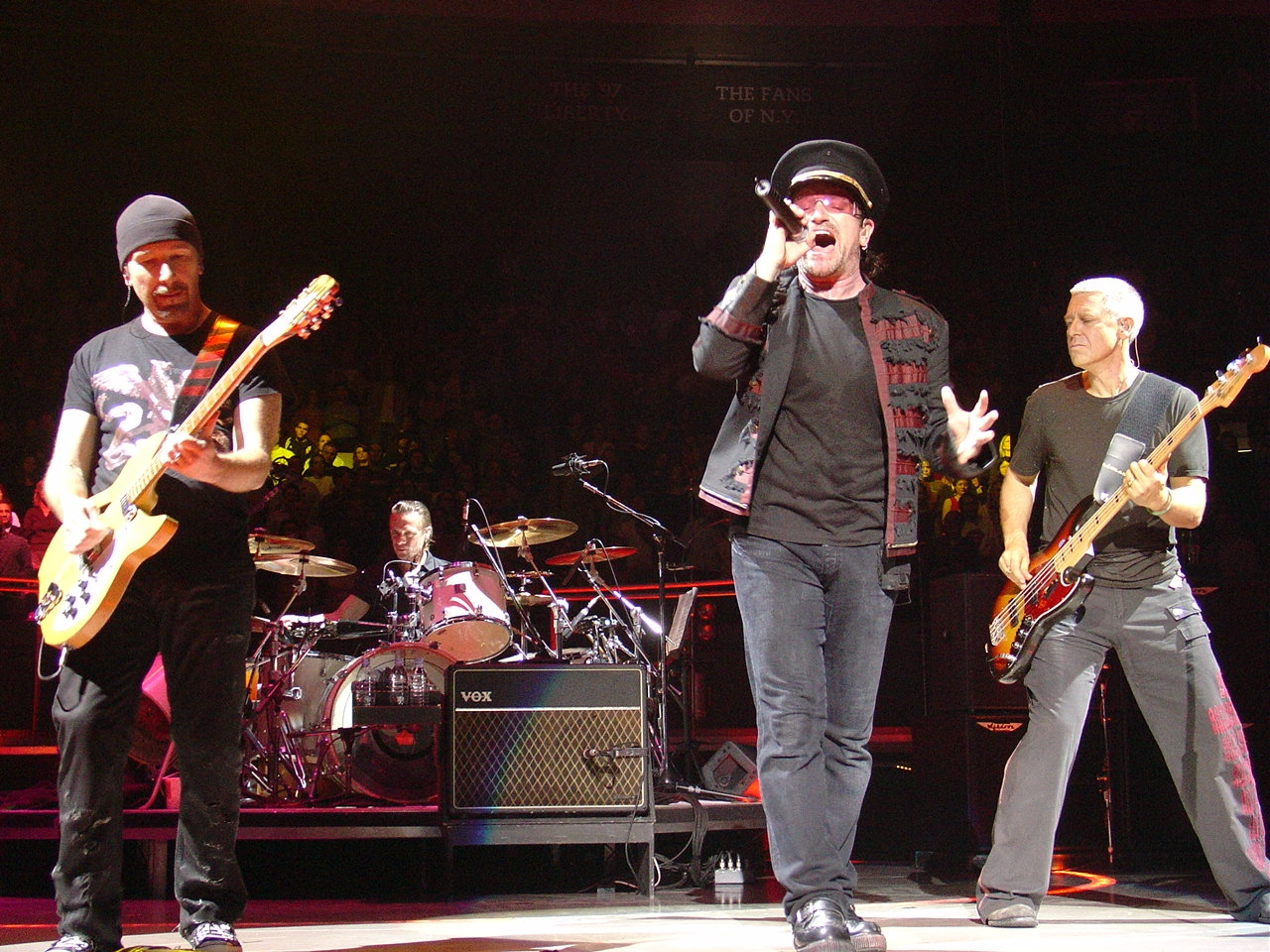
Six songs by Irish rock band U2 topped the Modern Rock Tracks chart in the 1990s, the most for any artist during the decade.

Alternative Airplay is a record chart published by the music industry magazine Billboard that ranks the most-played songs on American modern rock radio stations. Introduced by Billboard in September 1988 and named Modern Rock Tracks until June 2009, it was initially compiled based on weighted reports from several national rock radio stations. Starting with the chart dated June 12, 1993, radio airplay data compiled by Nielsen Broadcast Data Systems – which electronically monitors various radio stations on a daily basis – was introduced as a factor in determining chart rankings. Modern Rock Tracks later became solely based on Nielsen data, a change that took effect with the chart dated January 22, 1994.

145 songs topped the Modern Rock Tracks chart in the 1990s; the first of these was "Blues from a Gun" by The Jesus and Mary Chain, which spent three weeks at number one from December 1989 to January 1990. The modern rock radio format experienced a substantial growth in popularity during the decade, with the success of Nirvana's 1991 song "Smells Like Teen Spirit" marking a "return of the crossover rock hit". Speaking to Billboard in 1994, chart analyst Max Tolkoff remarked that in previous years, "people didn't care what was a hit on modern rock. Now everybody wants to be involved." The first formal number one debut on the Modern Rock Tracks chart also occurred during the 1990s, with "What's the Frequency, Kenneth?" by R.E.M. entering at number one on the chart for the issue dated September 24, 1994.

The Irish band U2 scored the most number-one hits on Modern Rock Tracks during the decade, with six of their songs topping the chart: "The Fly", "Mysterious Ways", "One", "Hold Me, Thrill Me, Kiss Me, Kill Me", "Discothèque" and "Staring at the Sun". "Scar Tissue" by the American band Red Hot Chili Peppers topped the chart for sixteen consecutive weeks in 1999, the longest time spent at number one by any song during the 1990s. The band themselves spent a record twenty-seven weeks at number one on Modern Rock Tracks during the decade with four chart-toppers: "Give It Away", "Soul to Squeeze", "My Friends" and "Scar Tissue". "All the Small Things" by Blink-182 was the final Modern Rock Tracks number-one hit of the decade.

== Number-one songs ==
Key
† – Billboard year-end number-one song (Note: The Modern Rock Tracks year-end number-one song of 1994 was "Black Hole Sun" by Soundgarden, which peaked at number two on the chart dated July 2.)
↑ – Return of a song to number one

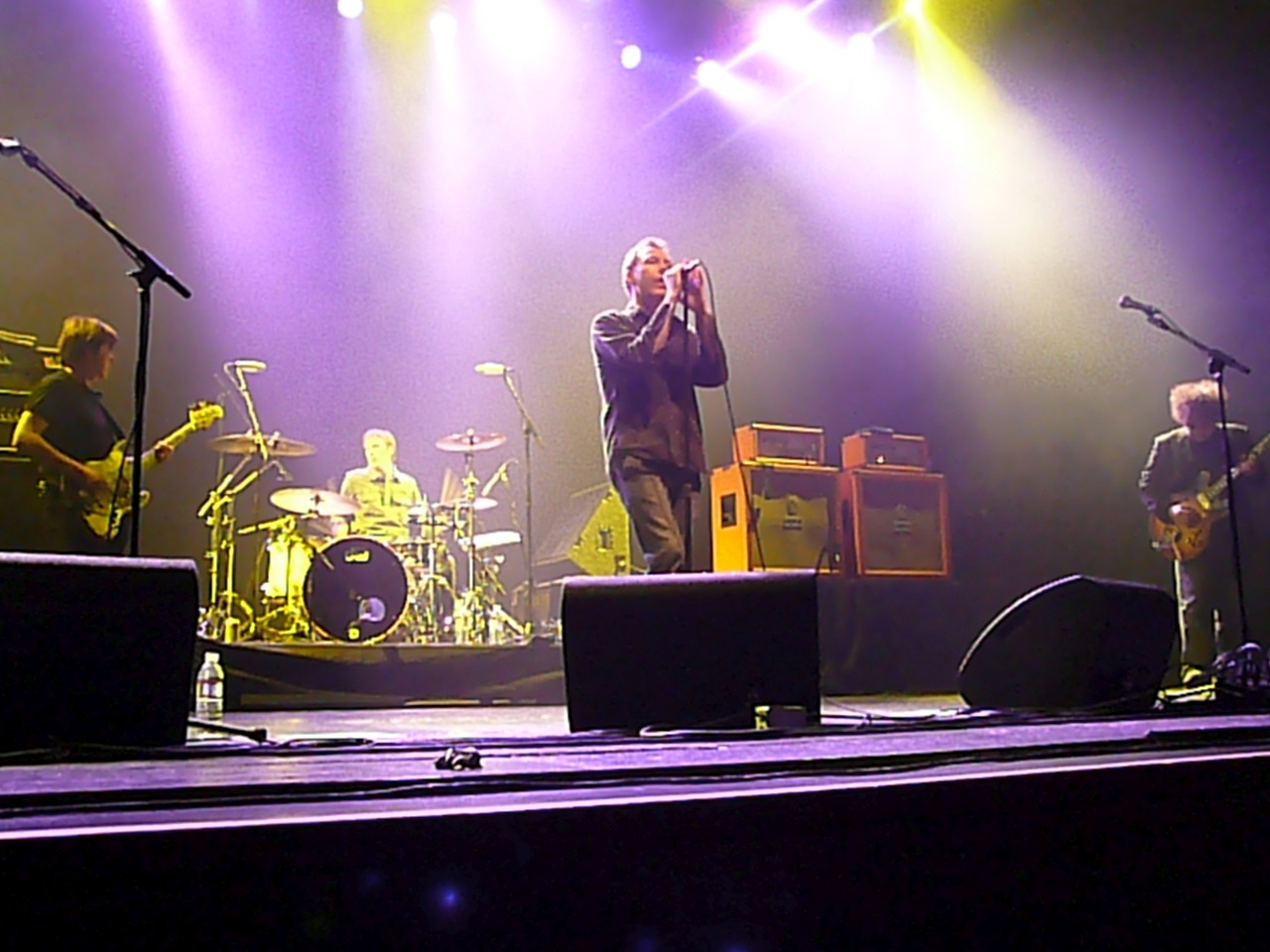
"Blues from a Gun" by The Jesus and Mary Chain was the first Modern Rock Tracks number-one hit of the 1990s.

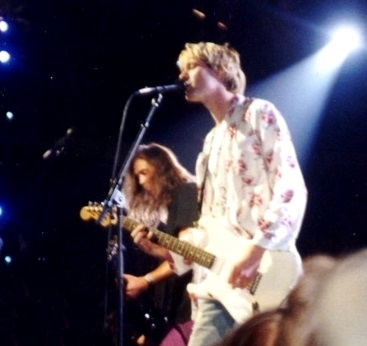
Nirvana attained four number-one songs on the chart during the decade, including the crossover hit "Smells Like Teen Spirit".

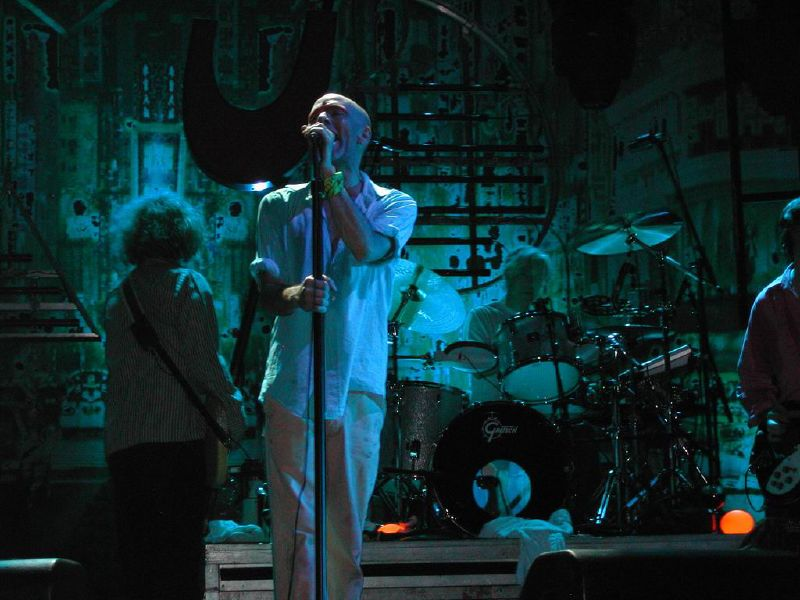
R.E.M.'s "What's the Frequency, Kenneth" was the first number-one debut in the chart's history.

Marcy Playground stayed at number one for fifteen weeks in 1998 with the song "Sex and Candy".

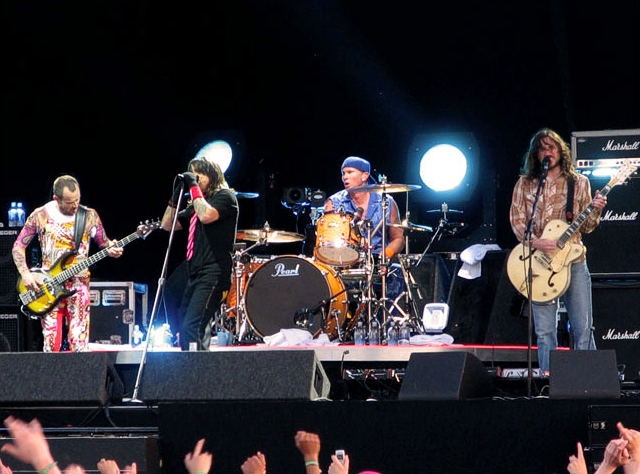
Red Hot Chili Peppers spent twenty-seven cumulative weeks at number one on Modern Rock Tracks during the 1990s.

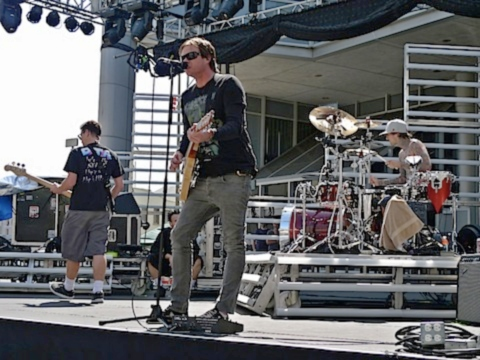
"All the Small Things" by Blink-182 was the final number-one song of the decade on the chart.

Song	Artist	Reached number one	Weeks at number one
"Blues from a Gun"	The Jesus and Mary Chain	December 30, 1989	3
"House"	The Psychedelic Furs	January 20, 1990	3
"Cuts You Up" †	Peter Murphy	February 10, 1990	7
"Nothing Compares 2 U"	Sinéad O'Connor	March 31, 1990	1
"Blue Sky Mine"	Midnight Oil	April 7, 1990	1
"Metropolis"	The Church	April 14, 1990	1
"Enjoy the Silence"	Depeche Mode	April 21, 1990	3
"The Emperor's New Clothes"	Sinéad O'Connor	May 12, 1990	1
"Forgotten Years"	Midnight Oil	May 19, 1990	1
"Here's Where the Story Ends"	The Sundays	May 26, 1990	1
"Policy of Truth"	Depeche Mode	June 2, 1990	1
"Way Down Now"	World Party	June 9, 1990	5
"Joey"	Concrete Blonde	July 14, 1990	4
"Jealous"	Gene Loves Jezebel	August 11, 1990	1
"I'll Be Your Chauffeur"	David J	August 18, 1990	1
"Jealous" ↑	Gene Loves Jezebel	August 25, 1990	1
"Stop!"	Jane's Addiction	September 1, 1990	1
"Every Beat of the Heart"	The Railway Children	September 8, 1990	1
"Stop!" ↑	Jane's Addiction	September 15, 1990	1
"Suicide Blonde"	INXS	September 22, 1990	1
"Never Enough"	The Cure	September 29, 1990	2
"Merry Go Round"	The Replacements	October 13, 1990	1
"Never Enough" ↑	The Cure	October 20, 1990	1
"Been Caught Stealing"	Jane's Addiction	October 27, 1990	1
"Merry Go Round" ↑	The Replacements	November 3, 1990	3
"Been Caught Stealing" ↑	Jane's Addiction	November 24, 1990	3
"More"	The Sisters of Mercy	December 15, 1990	5
"Kinky Afro"	Happy Mondays	January 19, 1991	1
"All This Time"	Sting	January 26, 1991	2
"Right Here, Right Now"	Jesus Jones	February 9, 1991	5
"Losing My Religion"	R.E.M.	March 16, 1991	8
"See the Lights"	Simple Minds	May 11, 1991	2
"The Other Side of Summer"	Elvis Costello	May 25, 1991	4
"Get the Message"	Electronic	June 22, 1991	2
"Kiss Them for Me"	Siouxsie and the Banshees	July 6, 1991	5
"Rush" †	Big Audio Dynamite II	August 10, 1991	4
"Until She Comes"	The Psychedelic Furs	September 7, 1991	2
"So You Think You're in Love"	Robyn Hitchcock and the Egyptians	September 21, 1991	5
"Give It Away"	Red Hot Chili Peppers	October 26, 1991	2
"The Fly"	U2	November 9, 1991	2
"Smells Like Teen Spirit"	Nirvana	November 23, 1991	1
"Mysterious Ways"	U2	November 30, 1991	9
"Sax and Violins"	Talking Heads	February 1, 1992	1
"What's Good"	Lou Reed	February 8, 1992	3
"Hit"	The Sugarcubes	February 29, 1992	5
"One" †	U2	April 4, 1992	1
"High"	The Cure	April 11, 1992	4
"Teen Angst (What the World Needs Now)"	Cracker	May 9, 1992	2
"Weirdo"	The Charlatans	May 23, 1992	1
"The Ballad of Peter Pumpkinhead"	XTC	May 30, 1992	2
"Friday I'm in Love"	The Cure	June 13, 1992	4
"Good Stuff"	The B-52's	July 11, 1992	4
"Midlife Crisis"	Faith No More	August 8, 1992	1
"Tomorrow"	Morrissey	August 15, 1992	6
"Digging in the Dirt"	Peter Gabriel	September 26, 1992	2
"Blood Makes Noise"	Suzanne Vega	October 10, 1992	1
"Drive"	R.E.M.	October 17, 1992	5
"These Are Days"	10,000 Maniacs	November 21, 1992	2
"Somebody to Shove"	Soul Asylum	December 5, 1992	1
"Steam"	Peter Gabriel	December 12, 1992	5
"Not Sleeping Around"	Ned's Atomic Dustbin	January 16, 1993	1
"The Devil You Know"	Jesus Jones	January 23, 1993	6
"Feed the Tree"	Belly	March 6, 1993	3
"I Feel You"	Depeche Mode	March 27, 1993	5
"Regret" †	New Order	May 1, 1993	2
"Walking in My Shoes"	Depeche Mode	May 15, 1993	1
"Regret" ↑ †	New Order	May 22, 1993	4
"Pets"	Porno for Pyros	June 19, 1993	5
"Break It Down Again"	Tears for Fears	July 24, 1993	3
"Soul to Squeeze"	Red Hot Chili Peppers	August 14, 1993	4
"My Sister"	The Juliana Hatfield Three	September 11, 1993	1
"No Rain"	Blind Melon	September 18, 1993	1
"Soul to Squeeze" ↑	Red Hot Chili Peppers	September 25, 1993	1
"No Rain" ↑	Blind Melon	October 2, 1993	2
"Heart-Shaped Box"	Nirvana	October 16, 1993	3
"Into Your Arms"	The Lemonheads	November 6, 1993	9
"Daughter"	Pearl Jam	January 8, 1994	1
"Found Out About You"	Gin Blossoms	January 15, 1994	1
"All Apologies"	Nirvana	January 22, 1994	2
"Loser"	Beck	February 5, 1994	5
"Mmm Mmm Mmm Mmm"	Crash Test Dummies	March 12, 1994	1
"God"	Tori Amos	March 19, 1994	2
"The More You Ignore Me, the Closer I Get"	Morrissey	April 2, 1994	7
"Selling the Drama"	Live	May 21, 1994	3
"Longview"	Green Day	June 11, 1994	1
"Fall Down"	Toad the Wet Sprocket	June 18, 1994	6
"Come Out and Play"	The Offspring	July 30, 1994	2
"Einstein on the Beach (For an Eggman)"	Counting Crows	August 13, 1994	1
"Basket Case"	Green Day	August 20, 1994	5
"What's the Frequency, Kenneth?"	R.E.M.	September 24, 1994	5
"Zombie"	The Cranberries	October 29, 1994	6
"About a Girl"	Nirvana	December 10, 1994	1
"Bang and Blame"	R.E.M.	December 17, 1994	3
"When I Come Around"	Green Day	January 7, 1995	7
"Lightning Crashes"	Live	February 25, 1995	9
"Good"	Better Than Ezra	April 29, 1995	5
"Misery"	Soul Asylum	June 3, 1995	3
"Hold Me, Thrill Me, Kiss Me, Kill Me"	U2	June 24, 1995	4
"You Oughta Know"	Alanis Morissette	July 22, 1995	5
"J.A.R."	Green Day	August 26, 1995	1
"Tomorrow" †	Silverchair	September 2, 1995	3
"Comedown"	Bush	September 23, 1995	2
"Name"	Goo Goo Dolls	October 7, 1995	1
"Hand in My Pocket"	Alanis Morissette	October 14, 1995	1
"Lump"	The Presidents of the United States of America	October 21, 1995	1
"Name" ↑	Goo Goo Dolls	October 28, 1995	3
"My Friends"	Red Hot Chili Peppers	November 18, 1995	4
"Glycerine"	Bush	December 16, 1995	2
"Wonderwall"	Oasis	December 30, 1995	9
"1979"	The Smashing Pumpkins	March 2, 1996	1
"Wonderwall" ↑	Oasis	March 9, 1996	1
"Ironic"	Alanis Morissette	March 16, 1996	3
"Champagne Supernova"	Oasis	April 6, 1996	5
"Salvation"	The Cranberries	May 11, 1996	4
"Mother Mother"	Tracy Bonham	June 8, 1996	3
"Counting Blue Cars"	Dishwalla	June 29, 1996	1
"Pepper" †	Butthole Surfers	July 6, 1996	3
"Standing Outside a Broken Phone Booth with Money in My Hand"	Primitive Radio Gods	July 27, 1996	6
"Who You Are"	Pearl Jam	September 7, 1996	1
"Down"	311	September 14, 1996	4
"Novocaine for the Soul"	Eels	October 12, 1996	2
"What I Got"	Sublime	October 26, 1996	3
"Swallowed"	Bush	November 16, 1996	7
"#1 Crush"	Garbage	January 4, 1997	4
"Discothèque"	U2	February 1, 1997	4
"Lakini's Juice"	Live	March 1, 1997	1
"One Headlight"	The Wallflowers	March 8, 1997	5
"Staring at the Sun"	U2	April 12, 1997	3
"The Freshmen"	The Verve Pipe	May 3, 1997	3
"Semi-Charmed Life" †	Third Eye Blind	May 24, 1997	5
"The Impression That I Get"	The Mighty Mighty Bosstones	June 28, 1997	1
"Semi-Charmed Life" ↑ †	Third Eye Blind	July 5, 1997	3
"Push"	Matchbox Twenty	July 26, 1997	1
"Fly"	Sugar Ray	August 2, 1997	8
"Walkin' on the Sun"	Smash Mouth	September 27, 1997	5
"Tubthumping"	Chumbawamba	November 1, 1997	7
"Everything to Everyone"	Everclear	December 20, 1997	1
"Sex and Candy" †	Marcy Playground	December 27, 1997	15
"The Way"	Fastball	April 11, 1998	7
"Closing Time"	Semisonic	May 30, 1998	5
"Iris"	Goo Goo Dolls	July 4, 1998	5
"Inside Out"	Eve 6	August 8, 1998	2
"One Week"	Barenaked Ladies	August 22, 1998	1
"Inside Out" ↑	Eve 6	August 29, 1998	1
"One Week" ↑	Barenaked Ladies	September 5, 1998	4
"Inside Out" ↑	Eve 6	October 3, 1998	1
"Celebrity Skin"	Hole	October 10, 1998	3
"Slide"	Goo Goo Dolls	October 31, 1998	1
"Celebrity Skin" ↑	Hole	November 7, 1998	1
"Slide" ↑	Goo Goo Dolls	November 14, 1998	1
"Fly Away"	Lenny Kravitz	November 21, 1998	2
"Never There"	Cake	December 5, 1998	3
"What It's Like"	Everlast	December 26, 1998	8
"Every Morning"	Sugar Ray	February 20, 1999	1
"What It's Like" ↑	Everlast	February 27, 1999	1
"Every Morning" ↑	Sugar Ray	March 6, 1999	5
"My Own Worst Enemy" †	Lit	April 10, 1999	11
"Scar Tissue"	Red Hot Chili Peppers	June 26, 1999	16
"Higher"	Creed	October 16, 1999	1
"The Chemicals Between Us"	Bush	October 23, 1999	2
"Learn to Fly"	Foo Fighters	November 6, 1999	1
"The Chemicals Between Us" ↑	Bush	November 13, 1999	2
"Higher" ↑	Creed	November 27, 1999	1
"The Chemicals Between Us" ↑	Bush	December 4, 1999	1
"Higher" ↑	Creed	December 11, 1999	1
"Re-Arranged"	Limp Bizkit	December 18, 1999	1
"All the Small Things"	Blink-182	December 25, 1999	8

== Bibliography ==
- Cateforis, Theo (2011). Are We Not New Wave?: Modern Pop at the Turn of the 1980s. University of Michigan Press. ISBN 978-0-4720-3470-3.
- Keith, Michael C.; Sterling, Christopher H. (2008). Sounds of Change: A History of FM Broadcasting in America. University of North Carolina Press. ISBN 978-0-8078-5888-2.
- Whitburn, Joel (2008). Rock Tracks 1981–2008 (3rd ed.). Record Research. ISBN 978-0-8982-0174-1.
