= Polar Bear (American band) =

US musical group (1995–2000)

- Origin: Los Angeles, California
- Genres: Alternative rock
- Years active: 1995–2000
- Label: Man's Ruin Records
- Past members: Eric Avery, Harold "Biff" Barefoot Sanders III, Dani Tull, Andy Troy

Polar Bear was an American alternative rock band that was active in the late 1990s, formed and led by bassist Eric Avery.

== History ==
After the 1991 break-up of Jane's Addiction, Eric Avery and guitarist Dave Navarro formed the band Deconstruction, which released its sole album in 1994. After that project ended, Avery formed Polar Bear with drummer/programmer Harold "Biff" Barefoot Sanders III, formerly of Ethyl Meatplow. Guitarists Dani Tull and Andy Troy also contributed to the band. They released two EPs in 1996 and 1997, and the full-length album Why Something Instead of Nothing? in 1999.

== Discography ==
- Polar Bear EP (1996)
- Chewing Gum EP (1997, 2026 vinyl)
- Why Something Instead of Nothing? (1999, 2026 vinyl)
