= Murder of Cindyana Santangelo =

Homicide in Malibu, California

- Location: Malibu, California, U.S.
- Date: March 24, 2025
- Attack type: Murder by induced embolism
- Victim: Cindyana Santangelo
- Perpetrator: Libby Adame

On March 24, 2025, 58-year-old actress Cindyana Santangelo (also known as Cindy Lair) was found dead at her home in Malibu, California. Although at the time of her death no foul play was suspected, investigation later revealed that Santangelo had died from an embolism caused by a silicone injection.

The woman who had given Santangelo the injection, Libby Adame, was convicted of second-degree murder in November 2025.

== Background ==
=== Cindyana Santangelo ===
Originally from New York, Cindyana Santangelo began her Hollywood career at a young age when cast in the 1989 music video "Bust a Move" by rapper Young MC. Also in 1989, she did vocals on the Jane's Addiction song "Stop!" saying in Spanish, "Ladies and Gentlemen, we have more influence over your children than you do. But we love them. Born and raised in Los Angeles, Jane's Addiction." Jane's Addiction lead singer Perry Farrell spoke about Santangelo in a 2003 Spin cover story, "That's Cindy Lair at the beginning of Ritual de lo Habitual. She was the Latin Marilyn Monroe. We met her, and I thought, 'Holy Mother, this girl is just gorgeous.' I actually wrote it out, but I don't know how to speak Spanish fluently."

Santangelo guest starred on such television shows as CSI: Miami, Married... with Children and ER as well as films such as The Adventures of Ford Fairlane and Hollywood Homicide with Harrison Ford.

On a scholarship she attended both the London Lee Strasberg School and then later NYU Tisch School of Arts and USC School of Cinema and Television. She was a mother to two sons.

=== Libby Adame ===
Prior to the Cindyana Santangelo conviction, illegal injections were said to be performed in a Sherman Oaks home by a woman who went by the name La Tia and her daughter who recruited clients on Instagram. In this same incident, Libby Adame and her daughter, Alicia Galaz, were found guilty of involuntary manslaughter, yet found not guilty of murder from the October 15, 2019, death of 26-year-old Karissa Rajpaul, an aspiring adult film actress, after they administered buttocks injections. Adame's daughter was found guilty of two counts of practicing medicine without a license and Adame herself was convicted of three counts of practicing medicine without a license. In April 2024, Alicia Galaz was given three years and eight months in state prison. Adame was sentenced to four years and four months in state prison.

== Incident ==
In March 2025, Santangelo was reported to have had a series of cosmetic injections in her buttocks administered by Libby Adame, an unlicensed beauty sculptor known as the "butt lady". The injections occurred at Santangelo's home "using silicone that was neither medically approved nor legally administered." A Los Angeles Fire Department team discovered Santangelo, unresponsive, at her home at roughly 7:15 p.m. on March 24, and was taken to the hospital, where she was pronounced dead. Initially, no foul play was suspected. The cause of death was an embolism brought about by a silicone injection.

== Murder trial ==
In October 2025, Adame was convicted in state court of second-degree murder and practicing medicine without a license. The following month, she was sentenced to a prison sentence of 15 years to life.
