= Scream (music club) =

Underground music club in Los Angeles, California, United States

Coordinates: 34.0443°N 118.2593°W

Scream was an underground music club in Los Angeles, CA from the mid-80s and into the 90s focusing on glam rock, death rock and industrial rock. Founded by Dayle Gloria, the "Queen of the Sunset Strip" and Michael Stewart, Scream hosted many of the larger rock bands, such as Guns N' Roses, Jane's Addiction, Red Hot Chili Peppers, Sisters of Mercy, 45 Grave, TSOL (True Sounds of Liberty), The Pandoras, and Human Drama. It was considered one of the more influential clubs/outlets in L.A./Hollywood due to the signing of many of its of local musical group bookings to major label record companies and its hosting of many of the larger touring acts of the goth/industrial scene.

Scream started in the fall of 1985 on Monday nights at the Seven Seas nightclub in Hollywood, where Mike Stewart and Dayle Gloria were DJ's. It then moved to Friday nights at the Berwin Entertainment Complex (now the site of the Hollywood Athletic Club) at 6525 Sunset Blvd, featuring two rooms: a dance floor with DJ on the left and a bar on the right featuring horror films projected on the wall. The décor in the dance room featured black toulle netting with images of Spanish Inquisition monks inspired by the 1961 Roger Corman film The Pit and the Pendulum, rendered with UV paints that glowed under the black lights. Fans blowing the netting made the images waver in a ghostly manner. These were created by Cleve Hall, subsequently known for the 2012 television show Monster Man on Syfy channel. Hall also coordinated the horror films projected in the bar area (as well as performed with his band Exquisite Corpse, featuring Sean Brennen of London After Midnight). Club owner Michael Stewart came up with the name based on the famous Edvard Munch painting and his best friend Steve Elkins created the logo. Advertising was largely based on unique illustrated flyers produced by "Mad" Marc Rude left on store counters throughout Hollywood.

After being shut down by the Fire Marshal for being over capacity, Scream relocated in 1986 to the Embassy Hotel in downtown Los Angeles at 9th Street and Grand Avenue. While there it encompassed three floors of the building, including the basement, where it featured a stage with live bands in one room and horror films in the other. There was a long, narrow staircase which led to the basement, walls and stairs painted black which, due to the high probability of someone pitching headfirst down the stairs in darkness, was dubbed "The Descent into Hell" by clubgoers. The upper floors featured rooms with DJs and dance floors and a room where underground videos were projected. In the summer of 1987 Scream was kicked out of the Embassy Hotel, gathering around 4,000 "mourners" on closing night, and re-opened later the same year at the Park Plaza Hotel in the Wilshire District.

Other acts to play Scream included Faith No More, Revolting Cocks, The Sugarcubes, Wiseblood, Lydia Lunch, Sea Hags, The Nymphs, Caterwaul, Living Colour, Specimen, and Christian Death.

Scream was used as a shooting location for several 80s films, including the club scene in Less than Zero and the club where Dr. & the Medics perform in Maid to Order, both 1987 releases.

In 1987, Geffen Records released Scream: The Compilation, a collection of bands that had become staples at the club, including Jane's Addiction, Human Drama, and Kommunity FK.
