= Ritual de lo Habitual =

- Standard cover to the album

Studio album by Jane's Addiction
- Released: August 21, 1990
- Recorded: 1989–1990
- Studio: Track Record (North Hollywood)
- Genres: Alternative rock; alternative metal; funk metal; hard rock
- Length: 51:30
- Label: Warner Bros.
- Producers: Dave Jerden; Perry Farrell

Jane's Addiction chronology
Nothing's Shocking (1988)	Ritual de lo Habitual (1990)	Live and Rare (1991)

Singles from Ritual de lo habitual
- 1. "Stop!" Released: August 2, 1990; 2. "Three Days" Released: August 2, 1990; 3. "Been Caught Stealing" Released: November 15, 1990; 4. "Classic Girl" Released: July 17, 1991

Alternative cover
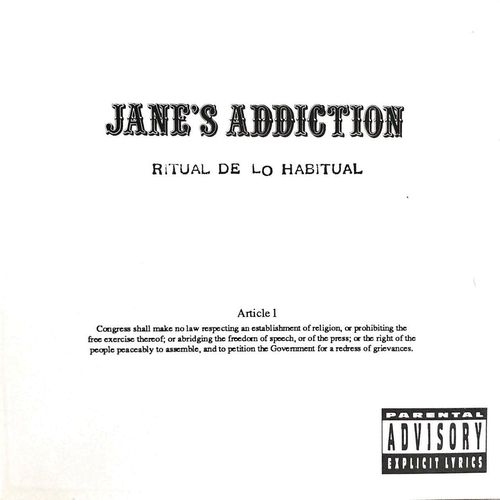
- "Clean" cover

Ritual de lo Habitual (Spanish for "Ritual of the Usual") is the second studio album by the American rock band Jane's Addiction, released on August 21, 1990, by Warner Bros. Records. Co-produced by Dave Jerden, it was the band's last studio album before their initial break-up in 1991 and the last to feature bassist Eric Avery, though he returned to the band on many occasions. The album includes some of Jane's Addiction's most famous songs, such as the singles "Been Caught Stealing" and "Stop!".

The album proved to be a great commercial and critical success. The album broke into the top 20 on the Billboard 200, sold 500,000 units within a month of its release, and would go on to be certified 2× Platinum in the U.S. The album has received critical acclaim since its release, and is regarded as a classic of Alternative Rock, alongside its predecessor, Nothing's Shocking.

== Background ==
Jane's Addiction's first album, Nothing's Shocking, received widespread critical acclaim and helped bring the group to prominence in Alternative Rock circles, despite underperforming commercially. After the album's release, the band went on tour, opening for Iggy Pop and The Ramones. By the end of the tour, the band was headlining clubs and theaters and was considered a leading band in the burgeoning Alternative Rock scene. In mid-1989, the band began to record their follow-up, Ritual de lo Habitual. Navarro later stated he had almost no recollection of working on the album due to his addiction to heroin.

== Music ==
The album is divided into halves. Tracks one through five are hard rock songs unrelated to each other, dealing with subjects such as stealing ("Been Caught Stealing") and anti-racism. ("No One's Leaving")

Tracks six through nine are in memoriam of singer Perry Farrell's deceased girlfriend Xiola Blue, who died of a heroin overdose in 1987 at the age of 18. "Three Days" and "Then She Did" bear a progressive rock influence, while "Of Course" carries a klezmer influence, with a prominent violin throughout. Eric Avery refused to play bass on "Of Course" out of resentment from being told what to play on other songs. Recording engineer and guitar tech Ronnie S. Champagne, who would later confess that Farrell had a tendency to dictate the other members' parts during the recording of this album, ended up playing bass on the song instead. For his part, Avery would later admit regret not playing on the track.

"Then She Did" also chronicles Farrell's mother's suicide when he was four years old. "It's probably one of the reasons we were brought together…" remarked guitarist Dave Navarro, whose mother was murdered when he was a teenager. "I have memories of us being onstage together and, before we played 'Then She Did', Perry would grab me and say, 'Let's do this for our moms.' I still get chills when I think about it." "When you have something like that happen…" noted Farrell, "the better thing to do is to try to make some flowers grow out of it."

== Packaging ==
Two versions of the disc packaging were created: one album featured cover artwork of a papier mâché sculpture co-created by artist Casey Niccoli and singer Perry Farrell that visually referenced the Santería religion. The artwork was related to the song "Three Days" and includes male and female nudity.

The second cover has been called the "clean cover", and features only black text on a white background, listing the band name, album name, and the text of the First Amendment (the "freedom of speech" amendment, erroneously referred to as "Article 1", which in reality establishes the legislative branch of government) of the U.S. Constitution. The back cover of the "clean cover" also contains the text:

Hitler's syphilis-ridden dreams almost came true. How could it happen? By taking control of the media. An entire country was led by a lunatic… We must protect our First Amendment, before sick dreams become law. Nobody made fun of Hitler??!

The "clean cover" was created so the CD could be distributed in stores which refused to stock items with represented nudity.

== Release and tour ==
The album was preceded by two singles, Stop! and Three Days, both released on August 2, 1990. The album was released on August 23, 1990, and proved to be a major commercial success, peaking at number 19 on the Billboard 200 and selling half a million copies within one month of its release.

To promote the album, the band went on a tour that proved quite strenuous for the band; Farrell later recalled, "That thirteen-month tour behind Ritual was half the reason we wound up unable to stand one another. The other half is that I am an intolerable narcissist who can't get along with anyone." A major schism occurred on the issue of drug use during the tour: Farrell and Perkins regularly partook, while Avery and Navarro abstained. According to Spin, between shows, Avery and Navarro sought to avoid temptation by retiring to a section of the tour bus set aside for them.

Part of the tour included headlining the first Lollapalooza festival, which traveled across North America in mid-1991 for 26 shows. Initially a farewell for Jane's Addiction, the festival was also a showcase for other cult artists: Siouxsie and the Banshees, Nine Inch Nails, the Butthole Surfers, Living Colour, The Rollins Band, The Violent Femmes, and Ice-T's Body Count. During the first Lollapalooza show, Farrell and Navarro got into a fight onstage after violently bumping each other mid-song. The band walked off before returning for an encore; however, the fight continued and Navarro eventually threw his guitar into the crowd.

The band broke up in 1991 after playing their last shows in Australia and Hawaii. "It's weird to be at the end of a cycle like that," remarked Avery, "having run the gamut of the usual 'rock story' from beginning to end: you get signed, get strung out, break up."

== Critical reception ==
Professional ratings
Review scores
Source	Rating
AllMusic	4.5/5 stars
Chicago Tribune	3/4 stars
Entertainment Weekly	A−
Los Angeles Times	3.5/5 stars
NME	9/10
The Philadelphia Inquirer	4/4 stars
Q	4/5 stars
Rolling Stone	2/5 stars
The Rolling Stone Album Guide	4/5 stars
Select	5/5

Ritual de lo Habitual was acclaimed by music critics, similar to the band's previous album. "The gigantic swerve and swagger of 'Stop', the Chili Pepperish taunts of 'Ain't No Right', 'Of Course''s raga rocking and, above all, the epic 'Three Days', where guitarist David Navarro gets to pile the layers shoulder high, prove to be the stuff of true compulsion," wrote Peter Kane in Q. "Enigmatic, audacious and unpredictable to the last."

"It all makes you realise how few bands actually bother to try and be any good, to play stuff that's inspirational," enthused Andrew Perry in a retrospective review for Select. The same magazine later listed Ritual as the fifth best album of the '90s: "Nevermind would never have been possible without it. And, along the way, they ushered in the Led Zep revival."

The album was voted the 24th best of 1990 in The Village Voice's Pazz & Jop, an annual poll of American critics nationwide. Robert Christgau, the poll's supervisor, remained unimpressed by the album, dismissing it as "junk syncretism (kitchen-sink eclecticism? styleless mish-mash?)".

Other musicians have spoken highly of the album. "I can spot traces of other people on this album, us included," remarked hard rock vocalist Alice Cooper in 1994, "but that's all they are: traces. They were a really original band. This is their peak album, where they really went out on a limb. Sometimes I get so caught up in these songs, I can actually feel the band pushing themselves to their limits. Sometimes I can't believe how strong it is. I wonder if this will have the same effect on some kid as Chuck Berry had on me ..."

In 2003, the album was ranked number 453 on Rolling Stone magazine's list of the 500 greatest albums of all time. The album was also included in the book 1001 Albums You Must Hear Before You Die.

In 2019, a book about the album, El Ritual de Jane's Addiction, was released by Argentinian journalist Fabrizio Pedrotti. It tells the story with collaborations from the band, producers and other artists from that era. Farrell and Dream Theater drummer Mike Portnoy wrote the foreword for it.

== Track listing ==
All tracks are written by Perry Farrell, Dave Navarro, Eric Avery and Stephen Perkins.

No.	Title	Length
1.	"Stop!"	4:14
2.	"No One's Leaving"	3:01
3.	"Ain't No Right"	3:34
4.	"Obvious"	5:55
5.	"Been Caught Stealing"	3:34
6.	"Three Days"	10:48
7.	"Then She Did ..."	8:18
8.	"Of Course"	7:02
9.	"Classic Girl"	5:07

== Personnel ==
Jane's Addiction

- Perry Farrell – lead vocals, piano ("Of Course"), guitar ("Three Days")
- Dave Navarro – guitar
- Eric Avery – bass
- Stephen Perkins – drums, percussion

Additional musicians

- Charlie Bisharat – violin ("Of Course"), electric violin ("Then She Did ...")
- Ronnie S. Champagne – bass ("Of Course")
- John Philip Shenale – strings ("Then She Did ...")
- Geoff Stradling – piano ("Obvious", "Then She Did ...")
- Cindy Lair – spoken word ("Stop!")

Other personnel

- Herman Agopyan – photography assistant
- Victor Bracke – photography
- Kim Champagne – advisor, art hostess
- Ronnie S. Champagne – engineering, guitar technician
- Chris Edwards – photography assistant
- Perry Farrell – artwork, production
- Ross Garfield – drum technician
- Liza Gerberding – advisor, word hostess
- Dave Jerden – production
- Bob Lacivita – engineering
- Casey Niccoli – cover artwork
- Tom Recchion – advisor, art host
- Eddy Schreyer – mastering

== Charts ==
=== Weekly charts ===
Chart (1990)	Peak position
Australian Albums (ARIA)	50
Canada Top Albums/CDs (RPM)	33
UK Albums (Official Charts)	37
US Billboard 200	19

=== Year-end charts ===
Chart (1991)	Position
US Billboard 200	80

== Certifications ==
Region	Certification	Certified units/sales
Australia (ARIA)	Gold	35,000^{^}
Canada (Music Canada)	Gold	50,000^{^}
United Kingdom (BPI)	Gold	100,000^{^}
United States (RIAA)	2× Platinum	2,000,000^{^}
^{^} Shipments figures based on certification alone.
