= Eric Avery =

American musician (born 1965)

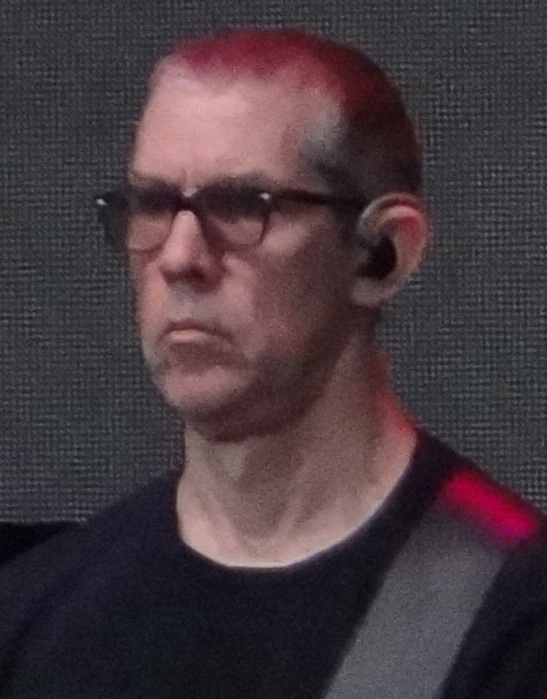
- Avery performing in 2021

Background information
- Born: Eric Adam Avery; April 25, 1965 (age 61); Los Angeles, California, US
- Genres: Alternative rock, alternative metal
- Occupations: Musician, songwriter
- Instruments: Bass, guitar, keyboards
- Years active: 1983–present
- Labels: Warner Bros., EMI/Capitol, Dangerbird

Eric Adam Avery (born April 25, 1965) is an American musician. He is best known as the founding bass guitarist and co-songwriter of the alternative rock band Jane's Addiction, with whom he has recorded two studio albums. From 2005 to 2022, Avery was the bassist for Garbage, which he joined as sideman and with whom he recorded three studio albums.

A core member of Jane's Addiction during its initial lifespan, Avery co-founded the band in 1985 with frontman Perry Farrell, and recorded two studio albums, Nothing's Shocking (1988) and Ritual de lo Habitual (1990), before the band's acrimonious break-up in 1991. Following Jane's Addiction's dissolution, Avery and guitarist Dave Navarro formed Deconstruction with drummer Michael Murphy, releasing one studio album in 1994. The following year, Avery began a solo project named Polar Bear, which he focused on between 1995 and 2000. Declining to take part in Jane's Addiction's 1997 and 2001 reunions, Avery eventually rejoined the band in 2008. The original core line-up of the band embarked on a co-headlining tour with Nine Inch Nails, with Avery departing in 2010 due to ongoing tensions with Farrell. In 2022, Avery rejoined Jane's Addiction after a twelve-year absence, in advance of a co-headlining tour with the Smashing Pumpkins.

Alongside his work with Jane's Addiction, Avery is a former member of Alanis Morissette's backing band, and has been a touring and session musician for Garbage since 2005, contributing to the albums, Not Your Kind of People (2012), Strange Little Birds (2016) and No Gods No Masters (2021). Avery unofficially joined the Smashing Pumpkins in 2006 for a short spell, and was briefly a member of the rock supergroup Giraffe Tongue Orchestra.

To date, Avery has released two solo studio albums under his own name, Help Wanted (2008) and LIFE.TIME. (2013).

== Career ==
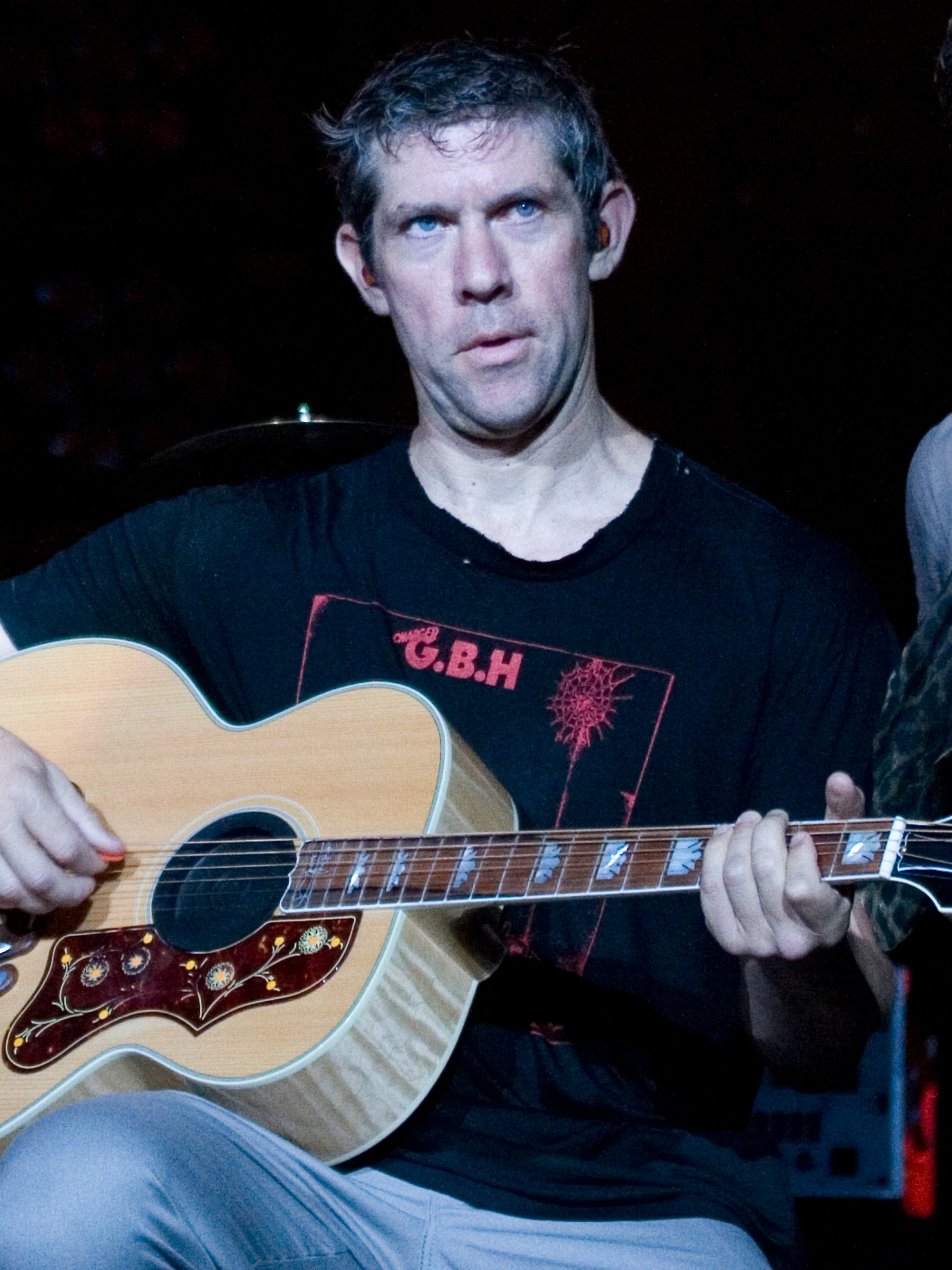
Avery performing in 2009

Avery and Dave Navarro met as classmates at St. Paul the Apostle Grammar School in West Los Angeles, a Catholic parochial school founded by the Paulist Fathers. Eric went on to St. Monica High School of Santa Monica, California, and Notre Dame High School in Sherman Oaks, California. Dave was classmates at Notre Dame with Stephen Perkins. Stephen met Eric's sister, Rebecca Avery, and they dated. Rebecca suggested that Eric and Perry Farrell audition Stephen as the drummer for Jane's Addiction after Perry and Eric cofounded the band.

Avery participated in the Deconstruction project with Navarro immediately after Jane's Addiction's breakup, but initially declined invitations for Jane's reunions. "I've asked him," said Farrell before 2001's Jubilee Tour, "but he says he wants no part of it. What else can you say but, Good luck to ya?"

Avery has recorded tracks for, toured with and briefly dated Alanis Morissette, as well as creating another side project, Polar Bear, in 1994. He was once suggested as the replacement bassist for Tool by former Jane's Addiction and then-current Tool manager Ted Gardner. Eric declined the invitation, saying he wanted to concentrate on Polar Bear.

As seen in the film Metallica: Some Kind of Monster, Avery auditioned for Metallica, after the departure of bassist Jason Newsted. The role didn't quite fit Avery and the band went with Ozzy Osbourne and Suicidal Tendencies bassist Robert Trujillo. Avery toured with the band Garbage to promote 2005's Bleed Like Me. Avery has also performed with Peter Murphy, on tour and on 2004's Unshattered.

Avery worked briefly with the revived Smashing Pumpkins, but ultimately did not join the band. He was not paid for his work, but said the sessions were a lot of fun: "I went into [the Pumpkins] with the same mentality I took with me when I auditioned for Metallica – I expected to have a good story to tell my wife. I had no expectations. I had heard nothing but bad things about working with Billy, but I went, and I found it to be a really inspiring time." Billy Corgan ended up playing bass on what would become 2007's Zeitgeist and hired Ginger Reyes for live performances.

In 2007, he contributed original music to the feature film documentary The 11th Hour. He also released his debut solo album Help Wanted in April 2008 through Dangerbird Records.

He finally performed with Jane's Addiction – for the first time since 1991 – at the NME Awards in 2008. Jane's played secret club shows in October and November 2008. On March 19, 2009, at South by Southwest Music festival in Austin, the quartet performed a 45-minute set at an abandoned Safeway grocery store.

Jane's Addiction's official website was updated in February 2009 stating that there was to be another club show soon. Photos of Avery, Perkins and Navarro, taken by Trent Reznor, appeared on Nine Inch Nails' official site, which led to speculation that Reznor was helping Jane's record new material. The relationship led to the booking of the "NIN/JA" (Nine Inch Nails/Jane's Addiction) tour, on which Avery played, and which evoked the first Lollapalooza tour of 1991, starring Jane's and Nine Inch Nails.

On March 1, 2010, after a ten-date rescheduled tour in Australia, Avery stated on his Twitter page: "the janes addiction experiment is at an end." Rumors were already spreading around a few weeks before, as Duff McKagan was said to be the new bassist for Jane's, but Avery had kept his position for the remaining few dates of the 2009/2010 tour.

In February 2012, Justin Meldal-Johnsen commented on the talkbass.com forum that Avery would be joining Garbage on their upcoming tour. In early May 2012 Garbage uploaded a video from their rehearsal, performing the song "Battle in Me", with Avery playing bass. Avery has since performed in the two Garbage tours that followed, the band's 20th anniversary tour and the one for the album Strange Little Birds, in which Avery plays bass in six tracks.

Avery released his second solo album, entitled LIFE.TIME., on February 15, 2013.

On February 25, 2013, Trent Reznor named Avery as the new touring bassist of Nine Inch Nails. Avery was slated to perform in the Twenty Thirteen Tour from Summer 2013 into 2014, but announced his withdrawal on May 15, 2013, stating that after a year travelling with Garbage he did not feel like going on another extended tour.

Avery composed the original soundtrack for Show Me What You Got, written and directed by Svetlana Cvetko and winner of the Grand Jury Prize ‘Best Film’ at Taormina Film Festival in 2019.

In May 2023, Garbage officially announced Avery's departure from the band after 18 years as its touring and recording bassist.

Jane's Addiction announced a US tour with Avery in 2024. On July 24, 2024, they released the single "Imminent Redemption", the first original song with Avery in 34 years. The band stated: "It is different this time. To have everyone back together, releasing new music. It's time. Welcome to the next chapter of Jane's Addiction. 'Imminent Redemption' is only the beginning." The band confirmed that they had been working on several other new songs, with Avery saying he was "guardedly optimistic" that they could complete new music: "The phrase that Dave and I were talking about the other day is: 'If there is a Jane's Addiction in 2025, then there will be new music for sure.' But you just never know if there's going to be a band at all."

During the band's show in Boston on September 13, 2024, Farrell shoved and punched Dave Navarro and had to be restained by crew members along with Avery who punched Farrell in defense of Navarro. Farrell's wife, Etty Lau Farrell, said Farrell had been suffering from tinnitus and a sore throat and felt his voice was being drowned out by the band. The following day, Jane's Addiction issued an apology and canceled their scheduled show at Bridgeport, Connecticut. On September 16, they canceled the remainder of the tour and said they would "take some time away as a group". Navarro, Avery and Perkins released a joint statement attributing the cancellation to Farrell's behavior and mental health, while Farrell released an apology of his own, saying his behavior was "inexcusable".

On January 3, 2025, it was revealed that Avery, Dave Navarro and Stephen Perkins were working on new music together, without the participation of Perry Farrell. Navarro also confirmed that Jane's Addiction were finished and that there was no chance of another reunion.

On July 16, 2025, Avery, Navarro and Perkins filed a lawsuit against Farrell accusing him of assault, battery, intentional infliction of emotional distress, negligence, breach of fiduciary duty, and breach of contract. The lawsuit also alleges that the group lost over $10 million as a result of the tour’s cancellation and cessation of all band activities including the first studio album with the classic lineup since 1990. The three members are also asking Farrell to pay all of the group’s outstanding bills stemming from the tour’s cancellation. Farrell a few hours later subsequently filed his own lawsuit against Avery, Navarro and Perkins, accusing his bandmates of bullying, assault and battery, and for "harassing him onstage during performances" which allegedly included "playing their instruments at a high volume so that he could not hear himself sing without blasting his own in-ear monitors at an unsafe level." Farrell also seeks damages for libel, claiming that the other members inaccurately described him in the media as suffering from poor mental health and alcoholism.

== Style ==
A self-taught bassist, Avery has singled Peter Hook of Joy Division and New Order as his major influence on bass playing, considering that British bassists were deeper with the instrument as "American rock bass is kick drum, it's just kick drum and then the root note of what the guitar player is doing." In Jane's Addiction, Avery stated that in the early phases the basslines would end up as a replacement rhythm guitar, "sort of built on that so Dave can riff on it and Stephen also can riff on it". On his solo career, Avery only played the bass at the final stages of Help Wanted, instead "focused on gadgets and keyboards and guitars and vocals and lyrics and other things like that". While playing with Garbage, Avery was for the first time "playing a more traditional bass role in a rock band" as his bass would only try to match Butch Vig's drumming.

"Nothing's Shocking influenced me a lot, especially with what Eric Avery proposed from the bass," says Nick Oliveri, of Queens of the Stone Age, Kyuss and Mondo Generator. "Eric had written the music on his own, the guitars and the drums came later. So he inspired me on that side"

== Selected discography ==
=== Solo career ===
- 2007/2008 The 11th Hour soundtrack
- 2008 Help Wanted
- 2013 LIFE.TIME.(free download)
- 2016/2017 Delible (limited cassette-only release)

=== Jane's Addiction ===
- 1987 Jane's Addiction
- 1988 Nothing's Shocking
- 1990 Ritual de lo Habitual
- 1991 Live and Rare (Compilation of B-Sides and the Remix of "Been Caught Stealing")
- 1997 Kettle Whistle (Compilation of live tracks, demos and unreleased material)
- 2006 Up from the Catacombs (Greatest hits album)
- 2009 A Cabinet of Curiosities (Box set)
- 2009 NINJA 2009 Tour Sampler ("Whores" & "Chip Away" studio recordings)
- 2024 Imminent Redemption / True Love

=== Deconstruction ===
- 1994 Deconstruction

=== Polar Bear ===
- 1996 Self-titled
- 1997/2026 Chewing Gum EP
- 1999/2026 Why Something Instead of Nothing?

=== Venice Underground ===
- 2001 Venice Underground ("Insane Toy Symphony")

=== Alanis Morissette ===
- 2002 Under Rug Swept ("Precious Illusions")
- 2002 Feast On Scraps (compilation - "Fear of Bliss")
- 2004 So-Called Chaos

=== Peter Murphy ===
- 2004 Unshattered ("The First Stone")
- 2015 Wild Birds Live Tour

=== Garbage ===
- 2012 Not Your Kind of People ("Battle in Me" & "Man on a Wire")
- 2013 One Mile High... Live (DVD)
- 2016 Strange Little Birds (6 tracks)
- 2021 No Gods No Masters ("Wolves", "Flipping the Bird", "No Gods No Masters")

=== Josh Klinghoffer / Pluralone ===
- 2019 To Be One With You ("Crawl")
- 2021 Mother Nature digital EP ("Mother Nature re-recorded 2")
- 2022 This Is The Show ("Claw Your Way Out" & "Any More Alone")
- 2023 Every Loser (Iggy Pop's 19th album - "Comments" with Taylor Hawkins)
- 2023 Perfect Saviors (The Armed)
