= Stop! (Jane's Addiction song) =

Single by Jane's Addiction

from the album Ritual de lo Habitual
- Released: August 1990
- Genre: Funk metal; hard rock
- Length: 4:14
- Label: Warner Bros.
- Songwriter: Jane's Addiction
- Producers: Dave Jerden; Perry Farrell

Jane's Addiction singles chronology
"Mountain Song" (1988)	"Stop!" (1990)	"Three Days" (1990)

Music video
- "Stop!" on YouTube

"Stop!" is a song by Jane's Addiction released on their 1990 album, Ritual de lo Habitual. It reached number one on the Billboard Modern Rock Tracks chart for two non-consecutive weeks. It was written in 1986.

== Track listing ==
No.	Title	Length
1.	"Stop!" (Album Version)	4:14
2.	"Three Days" (Album Version)	10:45
3.	"I Would for You" (Demo)	3:25

== Charts ==
Chart (1990)	Peak Position
US Alternative Airplay (Billboard)	1
US Dance Singles Sales (Billboard)	25

== See also ==
- Number one modern rock hits of 1990
- Murder of Cindyana Santangelo, featured vocalist on the track
