= Dave Navarro =

American guitarist (born 1967)

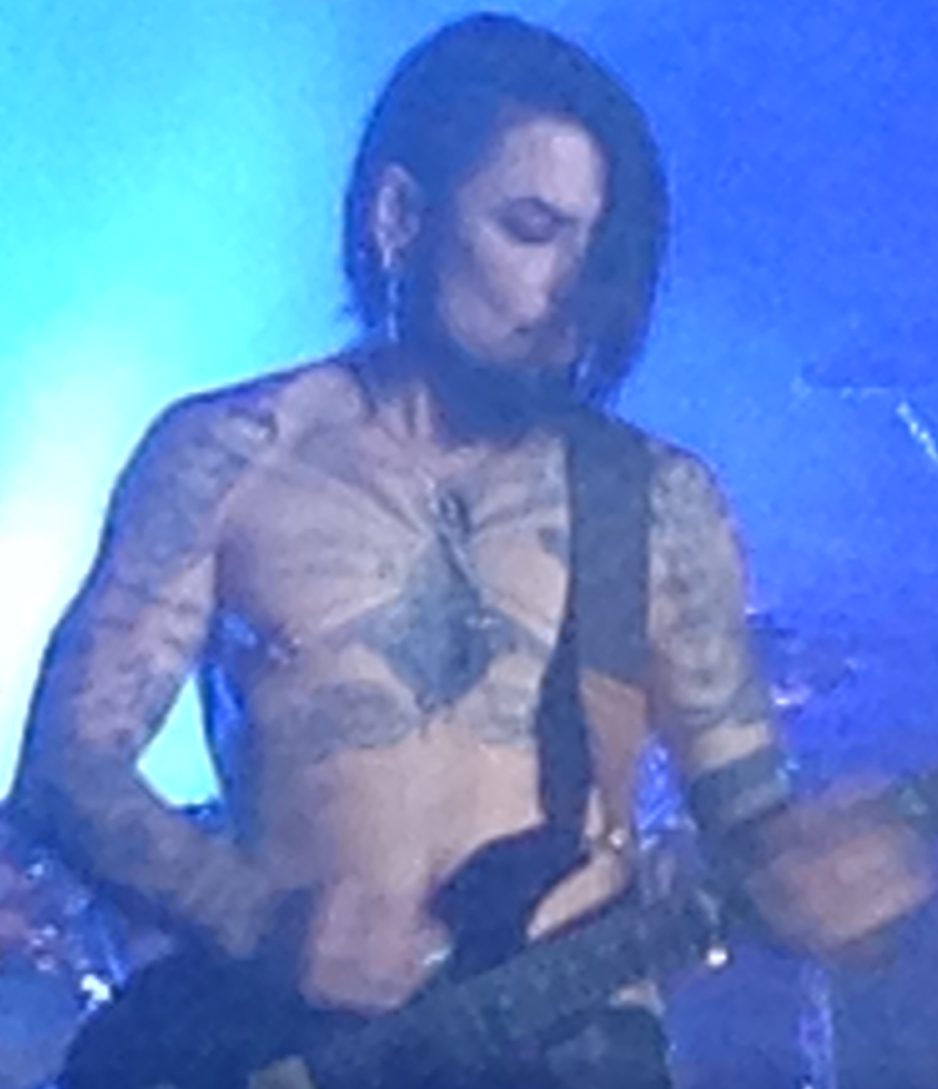
- Navarro in 2010

Background information
- Born: David Michael Navarro; June 7, 1967 (age 59); Santa Monica, California, U.S.
- Genres: Alternative rock; hard rock
- Occupation: Guitarist
- Instruments: Guitar; vocals
- Years active: 1986–present
- Formerly of: Jane's Addiction; Red Hot Chili Peppers; Deconstruction; The Panic Channel

David Michael Navarro (born June 7, 1967) is an American musician and songwriter. He is best known as a member of the rock band Jane's Addiction, appearing on all four studio albums. Between 1993 and 1998 during their first breakup, Navarro was the guitarist of Red Hot Chili Peppers, recording one studio album, One Hot Minute (1995), before departing. He has also released one solo album to date, Trust No One (2001). Navarro has also been a member of Jane's Addiction-related bands Deconstruction and the Panic Channel.

AllMusic's Greg Prato described Navarro as "one of alternative rock's first true guitar heroes", with an eclectic playing style that merges heavy metal, psychedelia, and modern rock. "He's one of the last great guitarists," said former Black Flag singer Henry Rollins.

Navarro also was a host and judge on Ink Master, an American tattoo competition reality series that aired on Paramount Network (formerly called Spike) from 2012 to 2020 and Paramount+ since 2022. He departed the show in 2022 after its 14th season.

== Early life ==
David Michael Navarro was born on June 7, 1967, in Santa Monica, California, the only child of James Raul Navarro and Constance Colleen Hopkins. His paternal grandparents were Mexican immigrants. His grandfather, Gabriel Navarro, was close friends with Mexican silent film actor Ramon Novarro, who allegedly adopted his friend's surname for the stage, though it was altered due to a typing error.

Navarro picked up the guitar at age 7, being inspired by his cousin, singer-songwriter Dan Navarro. He said that "When I was very young, it was always Jimi Hendrix." He was also fascinated by Yngwie Malmsteen for a brief period. Navarro also stated that he learned a lot from Robert Smith of the Cure and Daniel Ash of Bauhaus. He also said: "And I have always loved all the different guitarists that have been in Siouxsie and the Banshees." He considers that "The great innovators, for me, are still Hendrix and [Jimmy] Page." Van Halen's debut album was another reason why he learned to play guitar. To this day, his tastes range from eccentric virtuosos like Steve Vai and Al Di Meola, to experimenters like Kevin Shields and old-school blues players like Junior Kimbrough.

He attended Notre Dame High School in Sherman Oaks, California, where he was a member of the marching band with future Jane's Addiction bandmate Stephen Perkins.

== Career ==
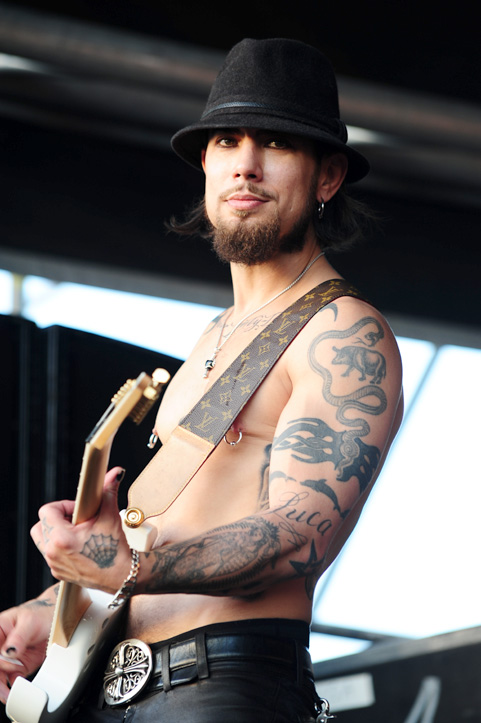
Navarro performing in 2010

=== 1986–1993 ===
Navarro joined the band Jane's Addiction in 1986 as the lead guitarist after he was recommended to vocalist Perry Farrell by Perkins, and replaced early guitarist Chris Brinkman. Over the next five years, Jane's Addiction released three albums, Jane's Addiction (1987), Nothing's Shocking (1988) and Ritual de lo Habitual (1990). Personal tensions, however, led to their breakup in 1991. The Lollapalooza festival was created by Farrell as a farewell tour for Jane's Addiction.

After the departure of Guns N' Roses' original rhythm guitarist Izzy Stradlin in August 1991, Navarro was the first choice of lead singer Axl Rose to replace Stradlin; despite four attempts to have him come in and play with Slash, he never showed up. However, he later went on to play on the 1999 Guns N' Roses song "Oh My God", which was featured on the End of Days soundtrack. In 1993, Navarro formed Deconstruction with Jane's Addiction's Eric Avery on vocals and bass and Michael Murphy on drums. The band put out one self-titled album in 1994. Rick Rubin was involved in the production and Butthole Surfers singer Gibby Haynes makes a guest appearance. They did not tour due to Avery's exhaustion after Jane's Addiction.

=== 1993–1998 ===
Navarro joined Red Hot Chili Peppers in September 1993. His first large-scale performance with the band was at Woodstock '94. The only album on which Navarro played with Red Hot Chili Peppers, One Hot Minute, was released in 1995. The band later recorded and released a cover of the Ohio Players' song "Love Rollercoaster" for the Beavis and Butt-Head Do America soundtrack, which was released as a single. The band also contributed to the John Lennon song "I Found Out" to the Working Class Hero: A Tribute to John Lennon album, as well as the One Hot Minute outtake "Melancholy Mechanics" to the Twister soundtrack.

In 1995, Navarro played guitar for Alanis Morissette's track "You Oughta Know" on one of the 1990s' most successful albums, Jagged Little Pill.

Despite mixed reviews, One Hot Minute sold over eight million copies worldwide and produced three hit singles. Navarro toured with Jane's Addiction for their 1997 Relapse tour with Flea on bass. After two years of touring on and off with Red Hot Chili Peppers, and his subsequent relapse into heroin addiction, Navarro was fired in 1998 over "creative differences". Navarro would later explain the main reasons for departing as being a result of not being given "the same latitude" with regards to his drug usage and recovery as Anthony Kiedis, who was also battling addiction, and his musical sensibilities never really matching with the rest of the band.

Navarro also remixed Janet Jackson's "What'll I Do" for her Janet Remixed album during this time.

In 1999, Navarro also appeared in a guest role as an escaped prison convict on an episode of Martial Law titled "Friendly Skies", alongside fellow rock musicians Bret Michaels, Rick Springfield and David Silveria.

=== 2001–2005 ===
The summer 2001 album Trust No One (Capitol Records) marked his solo debut. The band assembled for the accompanying US tour consisted of Navarro, guitarist Dave Kushner (who would go on to form Velvet Revolver), bassist Miiko Watanabe and drummer Angel Roché Jr.. He would later state that touring as a vocalist was harder to prepare for every night than just playing guitar, and wouldn't want to sing again. In 2002, Jane's Addiction reformed with bass player Chris Chaney and started work on a new album. The band entered the studio with veteran rock producer Bob Ezrin, resulting in the album Strays and the Lollapalooza 2003 tour in support of the album. In 2002, Michael Jackson performed at the Apollo Theater for the Democratic National Convention, and Navarro was set to play guitar for his hit song "Black or White". The song was ultimately cut from the set, but there are pictures and video snippets for the rehearsals. During this time Navarro also made a cameo in Mariah Carey's "Bringin' On the Heartbreak" music video.

Navarro began working with Camp Freddy during this time. In 2003, he and his fiancée, Carmen Electra, agreed to have their wedding preparations filmed for an MTV show titled Til Death Do Us Part; Camp Freddy played at the reception. The show was a success and was released on DVD in the fall of 2005. Navarro's book, Don't Try This at Home, was published on October 5, 2004, by ReganBooks, and quickly became a Los Angeles Times bestseller.

Navarro appeared in two tournaments on Celebrity Poker Showdown in 2004. In the third tournament of the series, he won his qualifying game and appeared in the championship round. In the fourth series, he appeared only in a qualifying round.

=== 2006–present ===
Navarro co-hosted with Brooke Burke, two seasons of the Mark Burnett television series: Rock Star: INXS and Rock Star: Supernova. Navarro and his band, the Panic Channel, released their album One, in August 2006. They toured with Rock Star Supernova (the band formed from the series) in January/February 2007. During this period, Navarro had his own internet radio station. He soon broadened his creativity with an internet talk show called: Dave Navarro's SPREAD TV, which was streamed on ManiaTV.com and was made available for download on iTunes. The show highlighted avant-garde subjects, artistry, and the human condition. Videos from the series are also available on Navarro's YouTube channel.

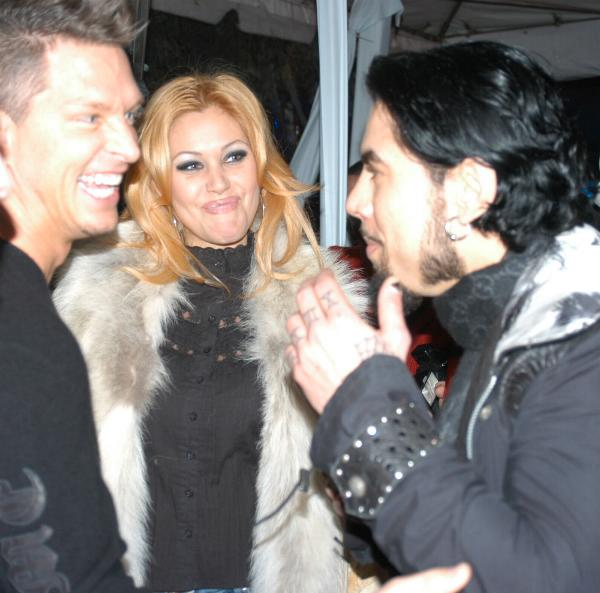
Navarro alongside Jay Grdina and Shanna Moakler at the Playboy Mansion in 2006

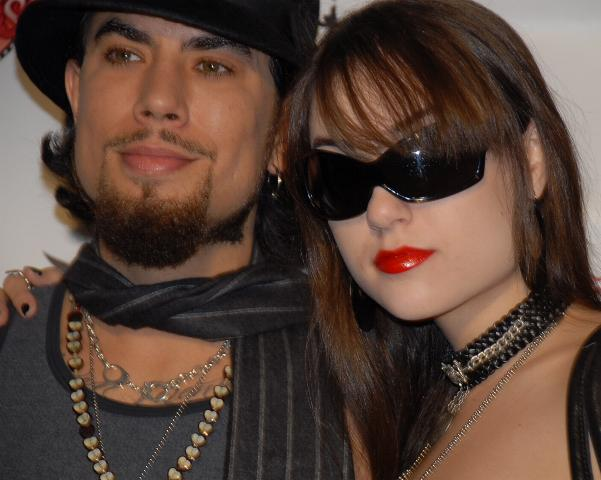
Navarro and Sasha Grey, 2007

In 2007, Navarro also teamed with Teravision to direct his first adult movie, Broken starring Sasha Grey (who he was also managing at the time), in the first of a planned series of celebrity-directed adult movies. This effort won "Best High End All-Sex Release" at the 2008 AVN Awards. Navarro appeared in Season 1 and Season 2 of Z Rock with Brooklyn-based band ZO2 on IFC. In 2008, he recorded additional riffs for the version of "Black Cat" performed on Janet Jackson's Rock Witchu Tour, appearing on screens during the rendition.

Jane's Addiction reunited once more in 2008 with all of the original members. Soon after performing together for the first time in 17 years at the NME Award ceremony in Los Angeles, the band was contacted by Trent Reznor. Reznor began working with Jane's Addiction in his studio; they recorded and released two songs ("Chip Away" and "Whores") online on the NINJA 2009 Tour Sampler. Both songs were previously released on their self-titled 1987 live album. This time together in the studio led directly to the pairing of Nine Inch Nails and Jane's Addiction for a worldwide tour in 2009. The tour was branded the NIN/JA tour by fans.

During August 2009, Navarro toured southern California as part of the Billy Corgan-led band Spirits in the Sky.

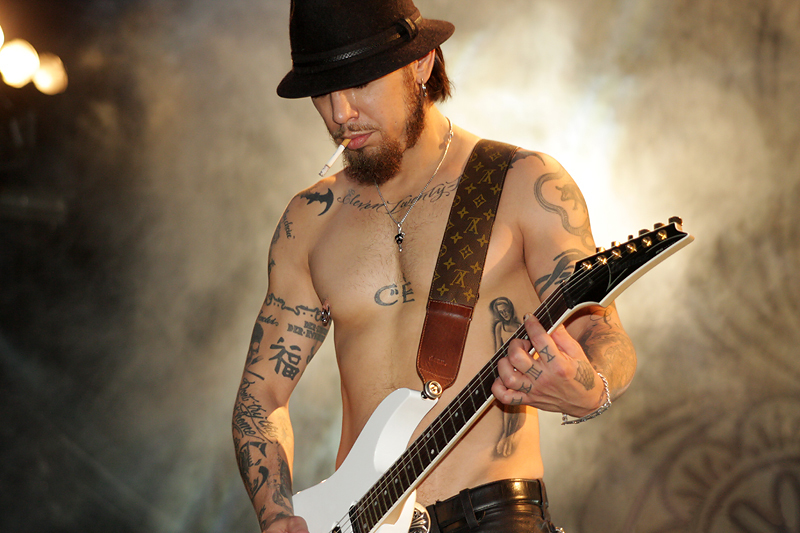
Navarro performing in 2009

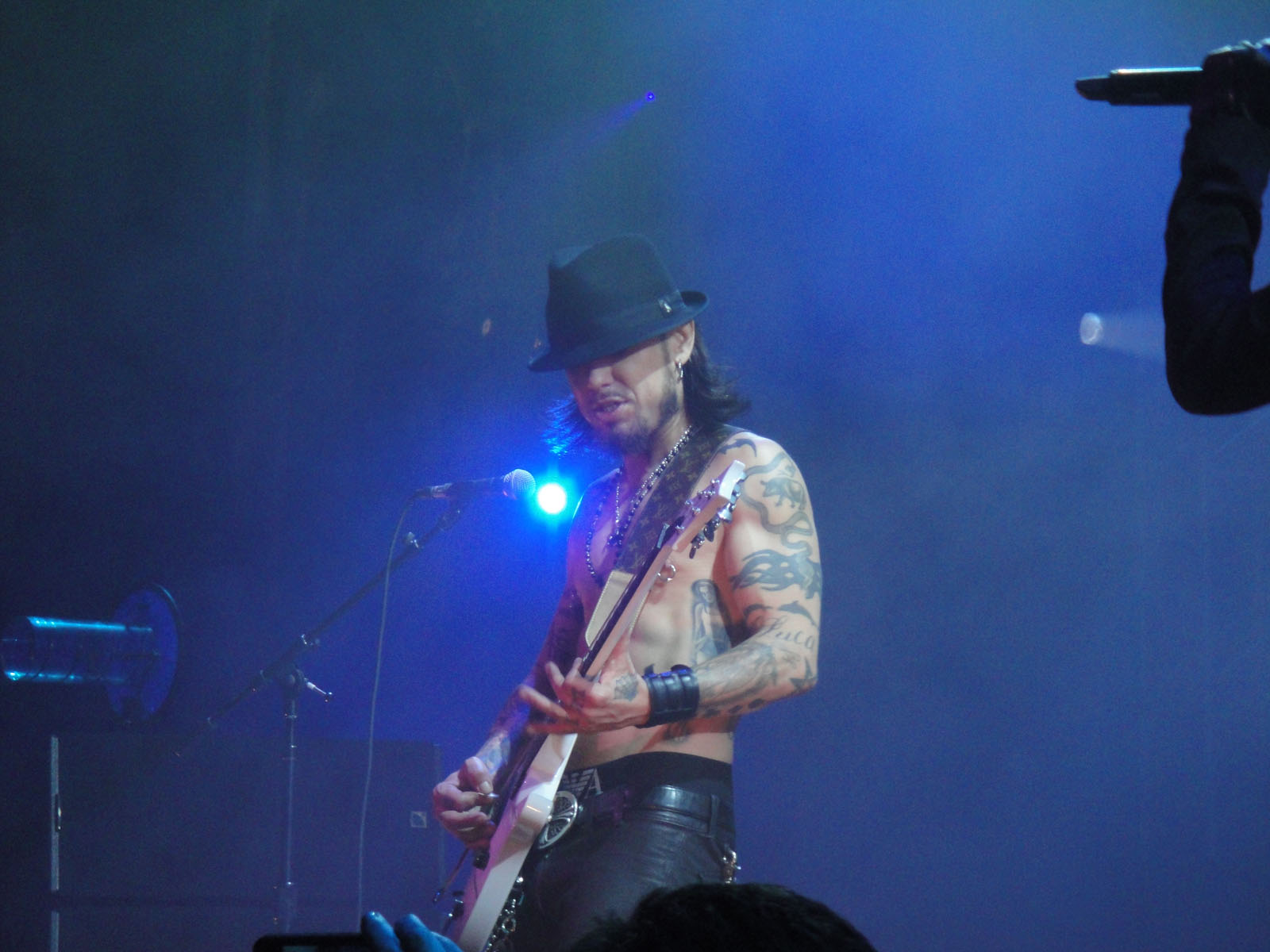
Navarro performing at E3 2011

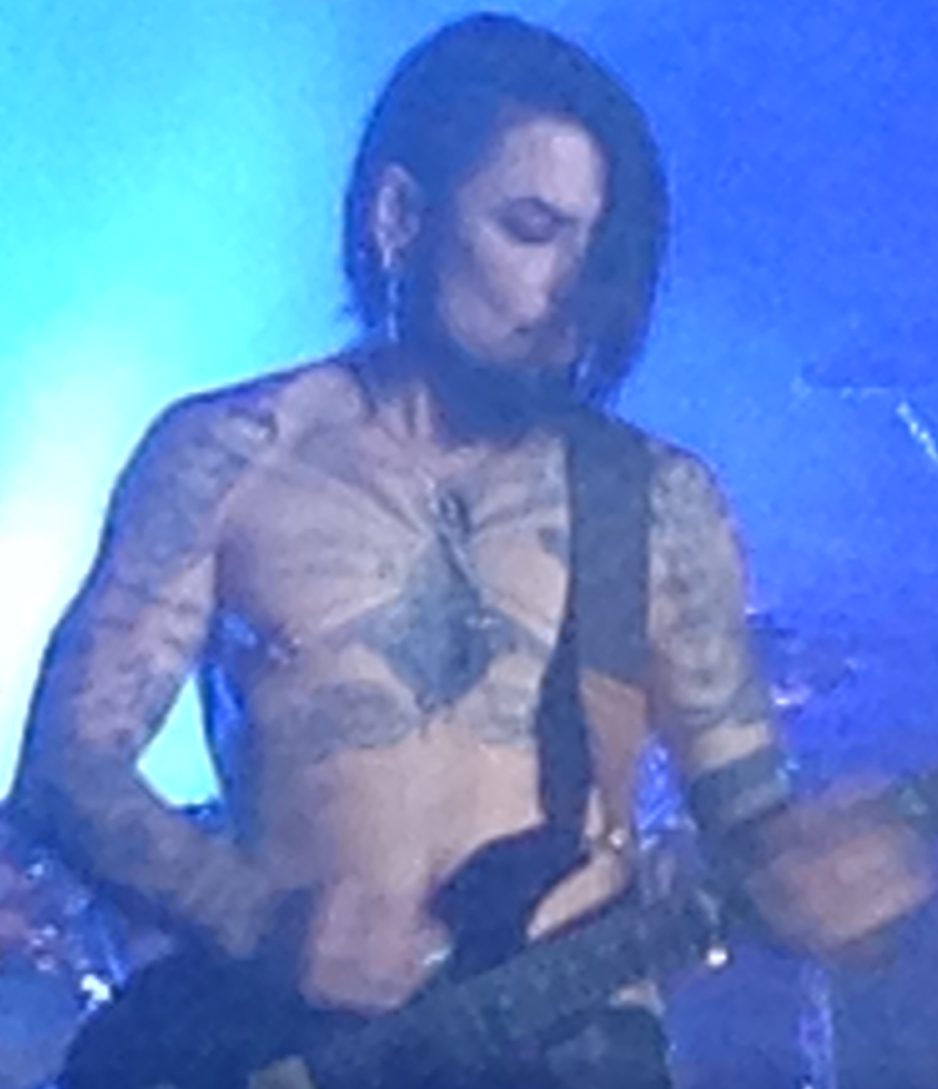
Navarro performing in 2014

In 2010, he posed naked for PETA's anti-fur campaign, "Ink Not Mink". He stripped down again for the group's anti animal-testing campaign in 2013.

In 2011, Navarro appeared as the "Director" of a Rock and Roll Fantasy Camp, playing a complicated passage for a "camper" to emulate, in a commercial for Citibank.

Navarro featured on the track "Girls/Fast Cars" on the album The Wombats Proudly Present: This Modern Glitch by indie rock band the Wombats.

The Red Hot Chili Peppers were named 2012 inductees to the Rock and Roll Hall of Fame, but Navarro was not included among the band's members inducted. When the announcement was made of the induction, Navarro said he was happy for the band but later said he had no plans to attend the ceremony, which was held in April 2012.

Navarro appeared in four episodes of the FX drama Sons of Anarchy in 2012 and appeared as a guest on an episode of Talking Dead. In February 2013, he had a guest role in Law and Order: SVU, playing a sound engineer. In January 2012, Navarro became host and judge on the Paramount show Ink Master.

In 2018, Navarro's personal assistant, actress Kelsey Gunn, started an online web series on Instagram known as "Assisting Navarro", providing an entertaining look into Kelsey's life and tasks as Navarro's assistant. This culminated in the release of the Assisting Navarro short film, which was released on January 31, 2020.

In 2019, Navarro formed an art collective known as Duel Diagnosis specializing in "apparel, art, and spectacle" focused on conversations regarding mental health and illness.

In 2020, Navarro began jamming with Chris Chaney and Taylor Hawkins, ultimately forming the "Yacht Goth" supergroup NHC (Navarro Hawkins Chaney). They made their live debut at Ohana Encore Festival on October 1, 2021. The band would perform a number of shows that featured guest musicians such as Bobby Gruska of The Belle Brigade, Pat Smear, Chad Smith, and Matt Cameron. and release a few singles and an EP up until Hawkins' death in 2022.

On February 8, 2020, Navarro performed with Jane's Addiction at a memorial show for Andrew Burkle, son of billionaire Ronald Burkle who died in January 2020. Navarro was photographed for the first time in 23 years with his former Red Hot Chili Peppers bandmates, who also performed. John Frusciante, who replaced Navarro in the band back in 1998, performed briefly with Jane's Addiction marking the first time the two Chili Peppers guitarists have shared a stage together.

On December 20, 2021, Navarro and Billy Morrison held their third annual Above Ground benefit concert in Los Angeles. They were joined onstage by Anthony Kiedis for a performance of Lou Reed's "Walk on the Wild Side". This marked the first performance of Kiedis and Navarro together in 24 years since Navarro was fired from the Red Hot Chili Peppers.

Navarro sat out a joint tour between Jane's Addiction and the Smashing Pumpkins in 2022 due to long COVID; his place was filled by Queens of the Stone Age guitarist Troy Van Leeuwen for the duration of the tour. Navarro was again absent from Jane's Addiction on their 2023 tour while still battling the effects of long COVID, and Josh Klinghoffer (who, coincidentally, was also a former member of the Red Hot Chili Peppers) played guitar in his place.

Jane's Addiction returned to the studio in 2023 to record new material and announced that Navarro hadn't participated due to his ongoing struggle with long COVID. Navarro returned to the band in May 2024 with the classic Jane's Addiction lineup performing their first show together in fourteen years on May 23, 2024. The show featured two new songs, the first new songs from the classic lineup in thirty-four years. They would embark on a 2024 tour of Europe and the U.S. with the original lineup for the first time in 15 years.

During this reunion tour, The Guardian reported tensions between band members during their New York City shows in September. On September 13, their show at Leader Bank Pavilion in Boston was cut short after Farrell shoved and punched Navarro, and was restrained by crew members. Farrell's wife, Etty Lau Farrell, said Farrell had been suffering from tinnitus and a sore throat and felt his voice was being drowned out by the band. She acknowledged animosity between the band members and said that Avery had physically attacked Perry during the incident. The following day, Jane's Addiction issued an apology and canceled their scheduled show at Bridgeport, Connecticut.

On November 19, 2024, Navarro announced (along with Billy Idol guitarist Billy Morrison) the fourth installment of the "Above Ground" benefit concert, scheduled to take place on January 25, 2025, at The Fonda Theatre in Hollywood, California. The event will celebrate vinyl "as an art form".

On January 3, 2025, it was revealed that Navarro, Eric Avery and Stephen Perkins were working on new music together, without the participation of Perry Farrell. Navarro confirmed shortly thereafter that Jane's Addiction would not continue.

On July 16, 2025, Navarro, Avery and Perkins filed a lawsuit against Farrell accusing him of assault, battery, intentional infliction of emotional distress, negligence, breach of fiduciary duty, and breach of contract. The lawsuit also alleges that the group lost over $10 million as a result of the tour's cancellation and cessation of all band activities including the first studio album with the classic lineup since 1990. The three members are also asking Farrell to pay all of the group's outstanding bills stemming from the tour's cancellation. Farrell a few hours later subsequently filed his own lawsuit against Navarro, Avery and Perkins, accusing his bandmates of bullying, assault and battery, and for "harassing him onstage during performances" which allegedly included "playing their instruments at a high volume so that he could not hear himself sing without blasting his own in-ear monitors at an unsafe level." Farrell also seeks damages for libel, claiming that the other members inaccurately described him in the media as suffering from poor mental health and alcoholism.

== Personal life ==
=== Murder of his mother ===
Navarro's mother and his mom's friend were murdered by his mother's ex-boyfriend, John (Dean) Riccardi, in March 1983. Riccardi was arrested in 1991, thanks to a viewer tip after Riccardi was featured on the television series America's Most Wanted. During his appearance on America's Most Wanted in 2004, Navarro stated that he was supposed to visit and stay with his mother on the night of her murder but at the last minute went to stay with his father. In 2015, Navarro released the documentary Mourning Son, which details his abuse at the hands of Riccardi and his spiral into drug addiction, as well as the pain he has had to overcome in the years since her death. The documentary culminated in Navarro meeting his mother's killer in prison.

=== Relationships ===
Navarro has been married four times, to celebrity makeup artist Tania Goddard-Saylor (1990–1992, divorced); Rhian Gittins (1994, annulled); model and actress Carmen Electra (2003–2007, divorced); and recently married actress Vanessa Dubasso in Scotland on March 29, 2025.

=== Health ===
In interviews in 2022 and 2024, Navarro described his persistent health struggles with long COVID that led to a hiatus from Jane's Addiction and a departure from Ink Master.

=== Politics ===
Navarro was invited to be a performer at the 2002 Democratic National Convention fundraiser titled "A Night at the Apollo", and at the 2012 Republican National Convention in which Mitt Romney was nominated for president. In 2016, he described his views in a tweet as "Libertarian". Navarro had stated he was supporting Marianne Williamson as a candidate for the 2020 Democratic presidential primaries. He subsequently expressed support for Tulsi Gabbard, including having her on his show while at the time she was a registered Democrat.

== Equipment ==
He began using PRS Guitars on the Lollapalooza tour in 1991. His signature model PRS (White with Gold Hardware) is now his primary stage guitar and is based on their Custom 24 model. He has several models in his regular stage and studio rig (like a double neck version), and was only the third PRS artist to have both a Maryland-made and SE version of their Signature Model.

Prior to his PRS signature line of guitars, Dave was mostly known for playing Ibanez RG guitars (like his RG with the Nothing's Shocking cover photo custom paint or Tele styled gold top) and Gibson Les Pauls, all of which were used for the first two Jane's Addiction albums. Since late 2008, he has been seen both live and in studio using a custom white Ibanez RG, with a humbucker/single/single pickup layout, gold hardware, and a vintage style tremolo, essentially an Ibanez version of his PRS Guitars Signature Model. He also used a blue Parker Fly guitar during his stint in RHCP, for songs that required an acoustic sound live. In 2019 through Guitar Center LA, Dave was reunited with his Custom Ibanez RG with Nothing Shocking graphic after it came into their store. Dave pawned it for drug money back in the '90s and forgot to pick the guitar back up. For music videos, Dave has primarily been seen to use Danelectro guitars (seen in "Rexall" and "Warped"), Fernandes guitars (seen in "Hungry"), Gibson Flying V (seen in "Bringin' On The Heartbreak"), and Custom Shop Fender Stratocasters (seen in "Aeroplane" and used for a majority of his time in RHCP). He has also used a Fernandes Mini Traveling NOMAD guitar to record the guitar solo on "Walkabout".

Dave's choice of guitar effects pedals are all made from BOSS. His amp preference was for the Marshall JCM 900 amp series which he preferred for their clean and dirty channels. In 2022, Dave switched over to using Friedman amps live. His preference for strings are Ernie Ball.

Epiphone Guitars (a subsidiary of Gibson) released its Dave Navarro Artist Acoustic in July 2010. According to an interview with Navarro on Gibson.com, the new guitar is based upon the classic Gibson (and Epiphone) "Hummingbird" design, and has already been played by the guitarist in the studio while recording with Jane's Addiction.

In 2024, the Fender Custom Shop and the Jimi Hendrix Estate had master builder Andy Hicks build Navarro a replica of Hendrix's "Izabella" guitar that he performed with at Woodstock. He would play the guitar live at the New Orleans stop of the Jane's Addiction 2024 tour. On September 18, 2024, Navarro announced a collaboration between himself, Supreme, and Jim Dunlop to release a limited edition Wah-wah Pedal.

== Discography ==
=== Solo discography ===
==== Albums ====
List of studio albums, with selected chart positions and sales figures
Title	Album details	Peak chart positions		Sales
Title	Album details	US	UK	Sales
Trust No One	Released: June 19, 2001; Label: Capitol; Format: CD, CS, 2x10"	61	187	US: 182,000

==== EPs ====
- Rhimorse (1995)

==== Singles ====
List of singles, with selected chart positions, showing year released and album name
Title	Year	Peak chart positions			Album
Title	Year	US Active	US Main	US Modern	Album
"Rexall"	2001	8	9	12	Trust No One
"Hungry"	2001	38	24	38	Trust No One

=== With Deconstruction ===
- Deconstruction (1994)

=== With Red Hot Chili Peppers ===
- 1995 One Hot Minute
- 1995 Working Class Hero: A Tribute to John Lennon ("I Found Out" only)
- 1996 Beavis and Butt-head Do America ("Love Rollercoaster" only)

With NHC (Navarro, Hawkins, Chaney)

- 2021 Navarro Hawkins Chaney (2 singles)
- 2021 Devil That You Know / Lazy Eyes (2 singles)
- 2022 Intakes & Outakes (EP)
- 2023 Every Loser (Iggy Pop's 19th album)

=== Guest appearances ===
With Janet Jackson

- 1995 Janet Remixed – lead guitar and remix on "What'll I Do" (Dave Navarro Mix)
- 2008 Rock Witchu Tour – lead guitar and video appearance on "Black Cat" (Live version)

With Nine Inch Nails

- 1995 Further Down the Spiral – lead guitar on "Piggy (Nothing Can Stop Me Now)"
- 2016 Not the Actual Events – lead guitar on "Burning Bright (Field on Fire)"

With Alanis Morissette

- 1995 Jagged Little Pill – lead guitar on "You Oughta Know"

With 4 Non Blondes

- 1995 Encomium: A Tribute to Led Zeppelin – lead guitar on "Misty Mountain Hop"

With Marilyn Manson

- 1998 Mechanical Animals – guitar solo on "I Don't Like the Drugs (But the Drugs Like Me)"

With Guns N' Roses

- 1999 End of Days OST – lead guitar on "Oh My God"

With Perry Farrell

- 2001 Song Yet to Be Sung – guitar and percussion on "Song Yet to Be Sung"

With P. Diddy

- 2001 The Saga Continues... – lead guitar on "Bad Boy for Life"

With Christina Aguilera

- 2002 Stripped – lead guitar on "Fighter"

With Gene Simmons

- 2004 Asshole – lead guitar on "Firestarter" (The Prodigy cover)

With David J

- 2002 Guitar Man - guitar on "Guitar Man"

With Glenn Hughes

- 2005 Soul Mover

With Tommy Lee

- 2005 Tommyland: The Ride – guitar solo on "Tired"

With the Panic Channel

- 2006 (ONe)

With Dead Celebrity Status

- 2006 Blood Music – guitar solo on "We Fall, We Fall"

With Ministry

- 2019 (Every Day Is) Halloween Acoustic – guitar

With Grey Daze

- 2022 The Phoenix – guitar solo on "Holding You"

== Filmography ==
Year	Title	Role	Notes
1993	Sexual Intent	Kidnapper #3	
1994	Floundering	Drug kid	
1999	Martial Law	Spitz	1 episode
2001	Charmed	Self	S4 Episode 4
2003	Uptown Girls	Rock Star	
2005–2006	Rock Star	Host	2 Seasons
2008	Rules of the Game	Self	1 episode
2008–2009	Z Rock	Dave	2 episodes
2010	FCU: Fact Checkers Unit	Dave	8 episodes
2011	One Tree Hill	Himself	1 episode
2013	Law & Order: Special Victims Unit	Mr: Ferrari	1 episode
2012–2013	Sons of Anarchy	Arcadio	4 episodes
2017	Odd Mom Out	Dave Navarro	1 episode
2012–2020, 2022	Ink Master	Self	Host/Judge (Seasons 1–13); Master of Chaos (Season 14)
