= Jane's Addiction discography =

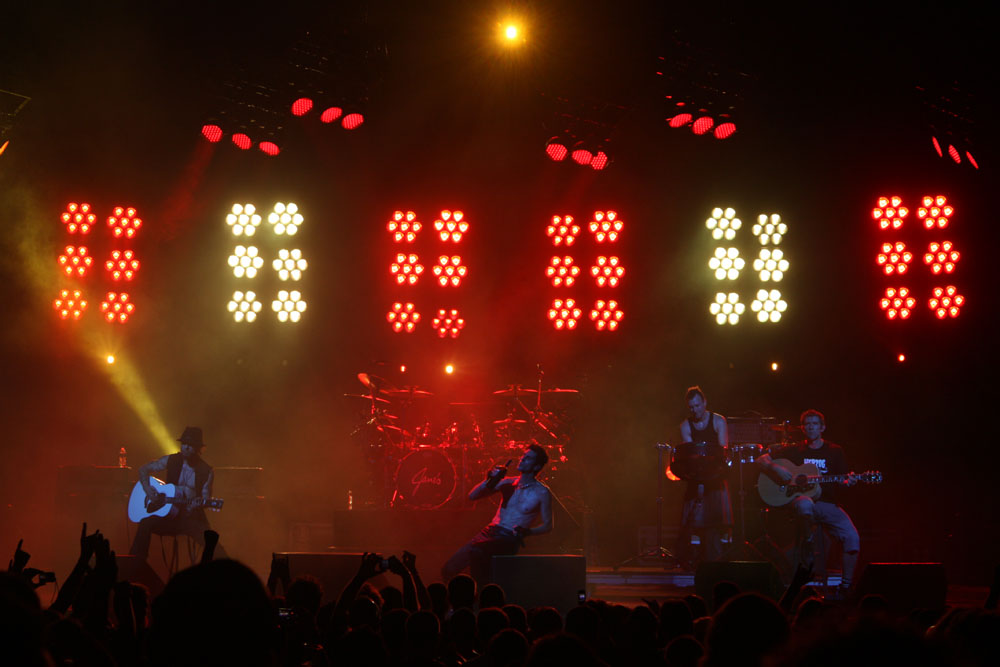
- Jane's Addiction performing in June 2009 at the Verizon Wireless Amphitheater in Charlotte, North Carolina.
- Studio albums: 4
- Live albums: 2
- Compilation albums: 4
- Singles: 17
- Music videos: 27

The discography of Jane's Addiction, an American alternative rock band, consists of four studio albums, two live albums, four compilation albums, seventeen singles and ten music videos. Jane's Addiction was formed in Los Angeles, California in 1985. The band is composed of Perry Farrell (vocals), Dave Navarro (guitar), Eric Avery (bass) and Stephen Perkins (drums). After breaking up in 1991, Jane's Addiction briefly toured in 1997, reunited in 2001 and then parted ways in 2004. Jane's Addiction reunited again in 2008, with founding member Eric Avery returning on bass. In 2010, Avery Left once again, only to return once more in 2022 however due to an onstage altercation between Farrell and Navarro in September 2024, the band split up for good according to Navarro with Navarro, Avery and Perkins filing a lawsuit against Farrell. The band's varied musical style has influences rooted in punk rock and heavy metal.

Jane's Addiction was one of the first bands to emerge from the early 1990s alternative rock movement to gain mainstream media attention and commercial success in the United States. Their initial farewell tour launched the first Lollapalooza festival, an annual touring alternative rock showcase. As a result, Jane's Addiction became icons of what Farrell dubbed the "Alternative Nation".

The band's debut live album, Jane's Addiction, was released in 1987 on Triple X. Although the album did not chart nationally, it sold well locally. Their debut studio album, Nothing's Shocking, was released in 1988 on Warner Bros. Records. The album was considered a failure on the music charts only reaching #103 on the Billboard 200, however, the album has since been certified 2× Multi-Platinum by the Recording Industry Association of America. Three singles, "Jane Says", "Mountain Song" and "Ocean Size", were released from the album in 1988 and 1989 respectively. Their debut single "Jane Says", became their first chart entry on the Alternative Songs chart, peaking at #6. The song was one of two songs from Nothing's Shocking to enter any Billboard chart ( "Ocean Size " #36 US Alternative ) .

In 1990, the group released their second studio album, Ritual de lo Habitual. The album reached the top 20 of the Billboard 200 and was also their highest-selling album to date, going 2× Platinum in the US. The album featured four singles including the number-one singles "Stop!" and "Been Caught Stealing". After this album, they took a 13-year hiatus away from new music, however, they did release six compilation and live albums between 1987 and 2009.

Strays was their first full-length studio album in 13 years. It was released on Capitol Records on July 22, 2003. It peaked at number 4 in the United States, along with many other international charts. The album's lead single, "Just Because", became their first appearance on the Billboard Hot 100. The song also became their first Top 5 on the Hot Mainstream Rock Tracks chart, as well as their third number one on the Alternative Songs chart. The second single, however, only made it into the Top 40 of the rock charts. Nevertheless, the album was certified gold.

After a four-year hiatus, Jane's Addiction reunited in 2008. After touring and recording, the band released its fourth studio album, The Great Escape Artist on October 18, 2011. In the summer of 2013, Jane's Addiction released a single, "Another Soulmate". In July 2024 the group released their first new songs since 1990 to feature the original lineup. "Imminent Redemption" was released in July 2024 and the group's final single, "True Love", was released five days after the group's break-up in September 2024. A new album was in the works but it is unknown if anything else was recorded prior to the band breaking up.

== Albums ==
=== Studio albums ===
List of studio albums, with selected chart positions and certifications
Title	Album details	Peak chart positions										Certifications
Title	Album details	US	AUS	CAN	FIN	FRA	IRL	NOR	NZ	SWI	UK	Certifications
Nothing's Shocking	Released: August 23, 1988; Label: Warner Bros.; Formats: CD, CS, LP, digital download	103	157	—	—	—	—	—	—	—	—	RIAA: Platinum; ARIA: Gold; BPI: Silver
Ritual de lo Habitual	Released: August 21, 1990; Label: Warner Bros.; Formats: CD, CS, LP, digital download	19	50	33	—	—	—	—	—	—	37	RIAA: 2× Platinum; ARIA: Gold; BPI: Gold; MC: Gold
Strays	Released: July 22, 2003; Label: Capitol; Formats: CD, LP, digital download	4	9	4	26	48	22	13	16	60	14	RIAA: Gold; BPI: Silver; MC: Gold
The Great Escape Artist	Released: October 18, 2011; Label: Capitol; Formats: CD, LP, digital download	12	71	31	48	—	74	—	—	—	52	
"—" denotes a recording that did not chart or was not released in that territory.

=== Live albums ===
List of live albums, with selected chart positions
Title	Album details	Peak chart positions	
Title	Album details	AUS	NZ
Jane's Addiction	Released: September 20, 1987; Label: Triple X; Formats: LP, CD, CS, digital download	174	39
Live in NYC	Released: July 8, 2013; Label: Universal Music; Formats: CD, DVD, Blu-ray, digital download	—	—
Alive at 25	Released: August 4, 2017; Label: Cleopatra Records; Formats: CD, DVD, Blu-ray, digital download	—	—

=== Compilation albums ===
List of compilation albums, with selected chart positions and certifications
Title	Album details	Peak chart positions						Certifications
Title	Album details	US	AUS	CAN	NOR	NZ	UK	Certifications
Live and Rare	Released: December 1991; Label: Warner Bros.; Formats: CD, CS, digital download	—	133	—	—	—	—	
Kettle Whistle	Released: November 4, 1997; Label: Warner Bros.; Formats: CD, CS, digital download	21	64	42	40	23	199	RIAA: Gold
Up from the Catacombs: The Best of Jane's Addiction	Released: September 19, 2006; Label: Rhino; Formats: CD, digital download	188	167	—	—	—	—	
A Cabinet of Curiosities	Released: April 6, 2009; Label: Rhino; Formats: CD box set	—	—	—	—	—	—	
"—" denotes a recording that did not chart or was not released in that territory.

== Singles ==
List of singles, with selected chart positions, showing year released and album name
Title	Year	Peak chart positions										Album
Title	Year	US	US Alt.	US Main. Rock	US Rock	AUS	CAN	IRL	NLD	SCO	UK	Album
"Jane Says"	1988	—	6	—	—	—	—	—	—	—	—	Nothing's Shocking
"Mountain Song"	1988	— (Note: "Mountain Song" did not enter the Billboard Hot 100 Singles Chart, but peaked at number 26 on the US Streaming Songs Chart.)	—	—	— (Note: "Mountain Song" did not enter the Hot Rock & Alternative Songs Chart, but peaked at number two on the Rock Streaming Songs Chart.)	—	—	—	—	—	— (Note: "Mountain Song" did not enter the UK Singles Chart, but peaked at number 45 on the UK Streaming Chart.)	Nothing's Shocking
"Had a Dad"	1988	—	—	—	—	—	—	—	—	—	—	Nothing's Shocking
"Ocean Size"	1989	—	—	—	—	—	—	—	—	—	—	Nothing's Shocking
"Stop!"	1990	—	1	—	—	—	—	—	—	—	—	Ritual de lo Habitual
"Been Caught Stealing"	1990	—	1	29	—	56	—	24	—	—	34	Ritual de lo Habitual
"Three Days"	1991	—	—	—	—	—	—	—	—	—	—	Ritual de lo Habitual
"Classic Girl"	1991	—	15	—	—	—	—	—	—	—	60	Ritual de lo Habitual
"Ripple"	1991	—	13	—	—	—	—	—	—	—	—	Deadicated
"Jane Says" (live)	1997	—	25	37	— (Note: "Jane Says" (live) did not enter the Hot Rock & Alternative Songs Chart, but peaked at number 28 on the Active Rock Chart.)	—	—	—	—	—	—	Kettle Whistle
"So What!"	1997	—	22	37	— (Note: "So What!" did not enter the Hot Rock & Alternative Songs Chart, but peaked at number 28 on the Active Rock Chart.)	—	—	—	—	—	—	Kettle Whistle
"Just Because"	2003	72	1	4	— (Note: "Just Because" did not enter the Hot Rock & Alternative Songs Chart, but peaked at number five on the Active Rock Chart.)	129	22	—	93	12	14	Strays
"True Nature"	2003	—	30	35	— (Note: "True Nature" did not enter the Hot Rock & Alternative Songs Chart, but peaked at number 32 on the Active Rock Chart.)	169	—	—	—	38	41	Strays
"End to the Lies"	2011	—	—	—	—	—	—	—	—	—	—	The Great Escape Artist
"Irresistible Force"	2011	—	9	23	16	—	—	—	—	—	—	The Great Escape Artist
"Underground"	2011	—	23	22	35	—	—	—	—	—	—	The Great Escape Artist
"Twisted Tales"	2012	—	—	—	—	—	—	—	—	—	—	The Great Escape Artist
"Another Soulmate"	2013	—	—	—	—	—	—	—	—	—	—	Non-album single
"Imminent Redemption"	2024	—	—	42	—	—	—	—	—	—	—	Non-album single
"True Love"	2024	—	—	—	—	—	—	—	—	—	—	Non-album single
"—" denotes a recording that did not chart or was not released in that territory.

== Music videos ==
- "Trip Away"
- "Mountain Song" (three versions)
- "Ocean Size"
- "Stop!"
- "Been Caught Stealing"
- "Ain't No Right" (live)
- "Classic Girl"
- "Jane Says" (live)
- "Just Because"
- "True Nature"
- "End to the Lies"
- "Irresistible Force"
- "Underground"

== Other appearances ==
Year	Song	Album	Label
1991	"Ripple"	Deadicated: A Tribute to the Grateful Dead	Arista
2009	"Chip Away"/"Whores"	NINJA 2009 Tour Sampler	The Null Corporation
2012	"Sympathy for the Devil"	Sons of Anarchy: Songs of Anarchy Vol. 2	Columbia
