= Hungry (disambiguation) =

Hungry refers to having hunger, the desire to eat.

Hungry may also refer to:

== Albums ==
- Hungry (Brainstorm album), 1997
- Hungry (Christian music album), a 1999 album of worship songs, or the title song
- Hungry (XYZ album), 1991
- Hungry, a 1971 album by Billy Guy, credited to The Coasters

== Songs ==
- "Hungry" (Dave Navarro song), 2001
- "Hungry" (Paul Revere & the Raiders song), 1966
- "Hungry" (Winger song), 1988
- "Hungry" (Fergie song), 2017
- "Hungry", a song by Common from One Day It'll All Make Sense
- "Hungry," a song by the Emersons, and a similar song by Billy Guy
- "Hungry", a song by Kutless from It Is Well
- "Hungry", a song by Lita Ford from Stiletto
- "Hungry", a song by Sepultura from Beneath the Remains
- "Hungry", a song by White Lion from Pride

== Other media ==
- Hungry (film), a 2026 British survival film
- Hungry!, a 2012 Japanese TV drama
- "Hungry" (Space Ghost Coast to Coast), an episode of Space Ghost Coast to Coast
- "Hungry" (The X-Files), an episode of The X-Files
- Hungry: A Mother and Daughter Fight Anorexia, a 2009 book by Sheila and Lisa Himmel
- The Hungry, a 2017 Indian film adaptation of Shakespeare's Titus Andronicus

== Places ==
- Hungry Range or Hungry Mountain, a mountain in Washoe County, Nevada, U.S.
- Hungry River, a river in North Carolina, U.S.
- Hungry Valley, a valley in Los Angeles County, California, U.S.

== See also ==
- Hungry generation, a literary movement in Bengali literature launched in 1960s India
- hungry i, a defunct nightclub in San Francisco, California, U.S.
- I'm Hungry (disambiguation)
- Hungary (disambiguation)
- Hunger (disambiguation)
