= Hungary (disambiguation) =

Hungary is a country in southeastern Central Europe.

Hungary may also refer to:

- Hungary (European Parliament constituency)
- Historical entities:
  - Principality of Hungary ("Duchy of Hungary")
  - (895–1000)
  - Kingdom of Hungary (1000–1918)
    - Kingdom of Hungary (1000–1301)
    - Kingdom of Hungary (1301–1526)
    - Eastern Hungarian Kingdom (1526–1570)
      - Ottoman Hungary (1541–1699)
      - Royal Hungary (1541–1867)
      - Austria-Hungary ("Austro-Hungarian Empire") (1867–1918)
  - Hungarian Democratic Republic ("Hungarian People's Republic") (1918–1919), an unrecognised rump state
  - Hungarian Soviet Republic ("Hungarian Republic of Councils") (1919)
  - Hungarian Republic (1919–20)
  - Kingdom of Hungary (1920–46) ("Regency")
  - Republic of Hungary (1946–1949)
  - Hungarian People's Republic (1949–1989)
- Greater Hungary (disambiguation)
- Hungary, Virginia

== See also ==
- Kingdom of Hungary (disambiguation)
- Category:National sports teams of Hungary for teams called "Hungary"
- Hungary for the Blues, live album by Chris Farlowe
- Hungary, the national personification of Hungary from the webmanga series Hetalia: Axis Powers
- Hungry (disambiguation), sometimes misspelled as "Hungary"
