= Live in NYC (Jane's Addiction album) =

Live album and DVD by American alternative rock band Jane's Addiction

Live album by Jane's Addiction
- Released: July 8, 2013
- Recorded: July 25, 2011
- Genre: Alternative rock

Jane's Addiction chronology
The Great Escape Artist (2011)	Live in NYC (2013)	Alive at 25 (2017)

Live in NYC is a live album and DVD by American alternative rock band Jane's Addiction. Recorded and filmed in 2011, at the time of its release in July 2013, it was their first fully live album in more than 25 years. The album features 12 tracks ranging from the band's classic "Mountain Song" to its more recent single "Irresistible Force".

== Track listing ==
1. "Whores"
2. "Ain't No Right"
3. "Just Because"
4. "Ted, Just Admit It..."
5. "Been Caught Stealing"
6. "Irresistible Force (Met the Immovable Object)"
7. "Up the Beach"
8. "Ocean Size"
9. "Three Days"
10. "Mountain Song"
11. "Stop!"
12. "Jane Says"

== Personnel ==
=== Jane's Addiction ===
- Perry Farrell – vocals
- Dave Navarro – guitars
- Stephen Perkins – drums, percussion
- Chris Chaney – bass guitar

== Reception ==
Prior to the release of Live in NYC, Loudwire said that the album "offers an all-out assault on the senses, mixing theatrical elements with the band's biggest hits throughout their career".
