= Hunger (disambiguation) =

Hunger is a prolonged condition in which insufficient amounts of food are available.

Hunger or The Hunger may also refer to:

== People ==
- Saint Hunger (died 866), Bishop of Utrecht (854–866)
- Alfredo Hunger (born 1955), Peruvian former swimmer
- Anna Hunger (active 1938), American science fiction writer
- Daniela Hunger (born 1972), East German double Olympic champion swimmer
- Frank W. Hunger (born 1936), American attorney
- Heiko Hunger (born 1964), German skier
- Herbert Hunger (1914–2000), Austrian Byzantine scholar
- Joachim Hunger (1957–1990), German sailor who competed in two Olympics
- Leo Hunger (1880–1956), American gymnast; see Gymnastics at the 1904 Summer Olympics – Men's artistic individual all-around
- Sophie Hunger (born 1983), Swiss singer/songwriter born Émilie Welti
- Wolfgang Hunger (born 1960), German sailor who competed in three Olympics

== Arts and entertainment ==
=== Films ===
- Hunger (1966 film), a Danish film based on Knut Hamsun's novel
- Hunger (1973 film), a Canadian animated short, one of the first CGI films
- The Hunger (1983 film), a horror film starring Catherine Deneuve and David Bowie, based on Whitley Strieber's novel
- Hunger (1986 film), an Australian television film directed by Stephen Wallace
- The Hunger (1986 film) (Arabic: الجوع), an Egyptian film based on Naguib Mahfouz's novel
- Hunger (2001 film), an American film based on Hamsun's novel
- Hunger (2008 film), a film about Irish hunger striker Bobby Sands, directed by Steve McQueen
- Hunger (2009 film), created by Steven Hentges and written by L.D. Goffigan
- Hunger (2023 film), a Thai drama about the fine-dining industry.

=== Literature ===
- Hunger (Hamsun novel), an 1890 novel by Knut Hamsun
- The Hunger (Strieber novel), a 1981 vampire novel by Whitley Strieber
- The Hunger, a 1986 novel by Naguib Mahfouz
- Hunger, a 1998 fiction collection by Lan Samantha Chang
- Hunger, a 2002 short-fiction collection by Jane Eaton Hamilton
- Hunger (Gone series), the second novel in the Gone series by Michael Grant, published in 2009
- Hunger (el-Bisatie novel), a 2009 novel by Mohamed el-Bisatie
- Hunger (Kessler novel), a 2010 young-adult novel by Jackie Kessler
- Hunger, a 2010 novel by Elise Blackwell
- The Hunger, a 2014 book by Lincoln Townley
- Hunger: A Memoir of (My) Body, a 2017 memoir by Roxane Gay
- The Hunger (Katsu novel), a 2018 historical novel by Alma Katsu about the Donner Party
- "Hunger" (poem), a poem by Jayanta Mahapatra
- Hunger (magazine), a biannual publication by British photographer Rankin
- Darkseid vs. Galactus: The Hunger, a 1995 crossover comic book published by DC Comics and Marvel Comics
- Hunger, a comic book miniseries, part of Cataclysm: The Ultimates' Last Stand

=== Music ===
==== Groups ====
- Hunger (band), a 1960s American rock band
- The Hunger (band), a 1990s–2010s American rock band

==== Albums ====
- Hunger (Frankie & The Heartstrings album), 2011, also the title song
- Hunger (Janis Ian album), 1997, also the title song
- Hunger (The Meteors album), 1980
- The Hunger (Michael Bolton album), 1987, also the title song
- The Hunger (Seven Day Jesus album), 1996, also the title song
- Hunger, 2024 studio album by Worm Shepherd

==== Songs ====
- "Hunger" (Florence and the Machine song), 2018
- "Hunger" (Molly Hammar song), 2016
- "Hunger", by The 69 Eyes from Back in Blood
- "Hunger", by Amaranthe from Amaranthe
- "Hunger", by Annihilator from Refresh the Demon
- "Hunger", by Aurora from A Different Kind of Human (Step 2)
- "Hunger", written by Kick Axe
  - first released by King Kobra on 1985's Ready to Strike
  - performed by Kick Axe (credited as Spectre General) on 1986's The Transformers: The Movie (Original Motion Picture Soundtrack)
- "The Hunger", by the Distillers from Coral Fang
- "The Hunger", by Fireflight from Unbreakable
- "The Hunger", by Of Mice & Men from Cold World
- "The Hunger", by Steve Holy from Blue Moon
- "The Hunger", by Shirley Manson, written by Serj Tankian
- "The Hunger", by the Misfits from American Psycho

=== Television ===
- The Hunger (TV series), a 1997–2000 British/Canadian horror anthology series
- "Hunger" (Dilbert), an episode of Dilbert
- "Hunger" (Legend of the Seeker), an episode of Legend of the Seeker

=== Other uses ===
- The Hunger (collection), a 1996 fashion collection by Alexander McQueen
- Hunger (Marvel Comics), a vampire character

== See also ==
- Olaf I of Denmark (c. 1050–1095), king of Denmark nicknamed Olaf Hunger
- Hunger Winter, the Dutch famine of 1944-1945 during World War II
- Hungry (disambiguation)
