= The Great Escape Artist =

Studio album by Jane's Addiction
- Released: October 18, 2011
- Recorded: 2010–2011
- Genre: Hard rock; art rock
- Length: 39:54
- Label: Capitol
- Producer: Rich Costey

Jane's Addiction chronology
A Cabinet of Curiosities (2009)	The Great Escape Artist (2011)	Live in NYC (2013)

Singles from The Great Escape Artist
- 1. "End to the Lies" Released: March 30, 2011; 2. "Irresistible Force (Met the Immovable Object)" Released: August 3, 2011; 3. "Underground" Released: 2011; 4. "Twisted Tales" Released: 2012

The Great Escape Artist is the fourth and final studio album by the American alternative rock band Jane's Addiction, released October 18, 2011 on Capitol Records. The album was the band's first since its 2003 release Strays and features TV on the Radio's multi-instrumentalist Dave Sitek contributing bass guitar alongside Chris Chaney. The album's release was preceded by singles "End to the Lies," released as a free download on April 7, 2011, and "Irresistible Force (Met the Immovable Object)," released August 3, 2011. Regarding the album's title, vocalist Perry Farrell said "I love being able to escape my past, even though my past was great. I just love the future even more."

Describing the album's overall aesthetic, Farrell noted: "It's a strange mixture of that post-punk goth darkness that Jane's had, with what's going on today with groups like Muse and Radiohead. As much as I want to appease fans and make old Jane's fans love me, I just can't help myself from moving forward." Following the album's completion, producer Rich Costey stated, "This was a real Jane's Addiction record."

== Background and recording ==
Jane's Addiction began writing The Great Escape Artist shortly after founding bassist Eric Avery's departure in 2010, with vocalist Perry Farrell stating, "Eric did not want to record. So we took him out of the equation. We couldn't live with not recording." Commenting on the relationship between the remaining three members of the band, Dave Navarro, Stephen Perkins and himself, Farrell stated: "Dave and Steve and I are like brothers. I've got children, and my kid smacked my other kid in the head this morning, but at the same time they hate being separated. On a plane one will say, 'I want to sit with my brother.' That's how I feel about Dave and Steve. I hope they'd tell you the same thing."

In January 2010, Velvet Revolver and Guns N' Roses bassist Duff McKagan joined the band for nine months, assisting in the writing process and performing live with the band. Describing his arrival, McKagan stated: "I went to dinner with Perry. He talked about how he was kind of bummed out. I guess, because Jane's had started the writing process for the record, and then they went through whatever they went through with Eric. He kind of lamented that, and at the end of dinner, he asked if I had any songs or anything like that. Basically, he was asking me for my help. [...] I started coming to Perry's garage with the rest of those guys, where they have a ProTools set up and so on. We just started jamming a few songs, and then went into a bigger room." Navarro noted: "We've been longtime friends, we've played together in a lot of the same scenarios, we're from the same time, the same city, the same scene to a degree. Those elements were in alignment." Upon joining, McKagan phoned former bassist Eric Avery: "I just wanted to let him know that I really respected everything he had done, and that I wasn't in there trying to take his place. We had a really great talk."

Despite describing the songs as "really cool," "really heavy" and "Pink Floydish". McKagan departed from Jane's Addiction in September 2010, with Farrell noting, "He didn't like the idea of electronics at all. That was his complaint." Following McKagan's departure, Farrell commented on the band's morale, stating "there was a moment of silence. Everyone had gripes, but at the same time, it was a sad time because we were building something together. It's like a sports team, then one guy gets traded, or retires, or gets injured. But your team has to go on. That's the state we were in." Navarro remarked, "whether he stayed in the band for 10 years or five minutes, he kept us in the direction of being productive. At the end of the day, that's really all I can ask for."

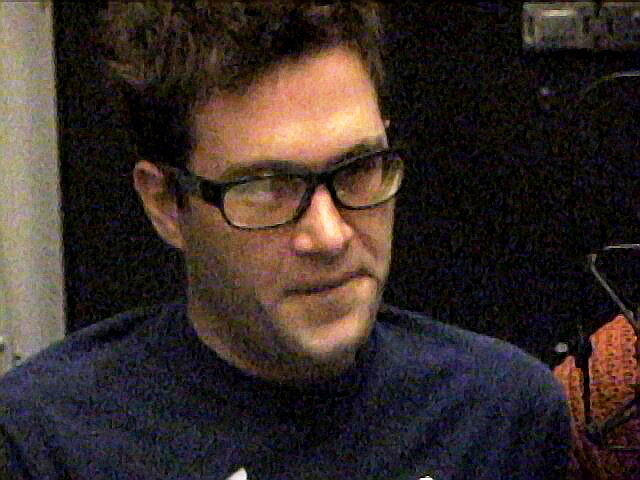
Dave Sitek co-wrote and performed bass during the recording The Great Escape Artist.

After considering a number of producers, including Flood, the band subsequently enlisted Rich Costey to produce the new material. Regarding the decision, guitarist Dave Navarro stated: "Rich is great. I worked with him on my solo album, and we have a long-standing, close relationship. I really trust his instincts and his ears. [...] As it turned out, we all really gelled with Rich. The communication between all of us was there immediately." At the suggestion of Costey, the band continued writing and recording, with TV on the Radio multi-instrumentalist Dave Sitek joining the band on bass guitar. Sitek, however, has not joined the band on a permanent basis, with Farrell noting: "He's like a pretty girl that I'm sleeping with but don't have to marry." Initially, both Navarro and Sitek split bass guitar duties during the writing and recording process. Described as "a solidifying element to the line-up," drummer Stephen Perkins remarked that Sitek's involvement "opened up my eyes to a lot of new ideas as a drummer," and noted that "There is this feeling we can make something ambitious. There is this ambition we have in us to break ground again. We really want to, as artists, move forward. That's an exciting thing, just like in the old days. We want to capture that danger and excitement again, and it's worth taking our time to do that." Navarro later stated, "it's strange to write with a guy who, by all accounts, is a member of the team, yet has very little investment in the project following the release. He worries only about what we are making; he doesn’t have to tour, answer questions in the press and make this his life for a while. That kind of perspective is both unique, invaluable and hard to come by. He only cares about the music and nothing more, he goes back to TV on the Radio when he finishes working with us."

Perry Farrell recorded his vocal parts at his home studio, sending audio files by email to Navarro, Perkins and Sitek. Regarding this method, Farrell stated: "I am enjoying it. I'm not sure if it's because I've finally gotten old enough to calm down, and just let things kind of unfold or what. In the past, there was a lot more friction."

During recording, former bassist Chris Chaney re-joined the band for its live performances, and subsequently began recording bass guitar parts, alongside Sitek, for the forthcoming album. In May 2011, Farrell commented on Chaney's involvement: "I have to keep [Chris] away from Queen, who want him and they're not going to get him unless we're not doing anything. Then they can have him. I'm getting him on the record and then he's going to come out with us for eight months." According to Navarro, "There are a few moments on songs that I'm playing bass parts, but overall the bass duties are split between Dave Sitek and Chris Chaney, both creative and talented players. Chaney will be touring with us when the tour to support the album begins. He's the only bassist that's recorded a full-length album with us, and is truly a member of the Jane's Addiction family, besides Avery, especially on the road. We are certainly lucky to have him."

== Writing and composition ==
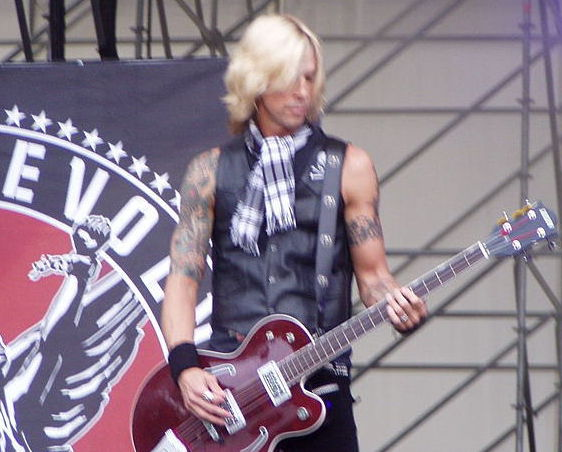
Duff McKagan joined the band for nine months during the album's initial writing sessions.

Regarding the various line-up changes which preceded the album's recording and eventual release, guitarist Dave Navarro stated that: "All the changes we've gone through are a necessary part of the process this time. This is one of the most enjoyable journeys that I've been on in many, many, many years. [...] It's a completely different direction for Jane's Addiction, however, it still sounds very much like Jane's Addiction," with drummer Stephen Perkins noting that "it's important to not repeat what we did. We know we can make a rock record with rock riffs and a big drum beat. I don't want to do that. I want to go in and make a listenable onion with layers and layers and layers so you can actually digest it. It's definitely been a good writing experience and a good changing experience. [...] There are songs that take you on a journey, songs that grow from soft to hard to tribal to psychedelic to metal in one song. We're trying to explore that hybrid again."

Vocalist Perry Farrell commented on the writing process, stating that it was "very different" to how the material on their previous albums had been conceived: "We have options now to make music through technology and we're taking advantage of it; we're not afraid of it. [...] We'll write some tracks and send them back and forth, and we'll deconstruct a demo. Everybody's ears need to be excited with fresh sounds, interesting chord structures, arrangements, and compositions. And it's not easy to come up with something original and fresh. What can help you are electronics." During recording, Farrell elaborated further, noting that "Now that we're working with these modern things, our attitude has had to change. Where you're not playing on this part, and that's OK; it's for the greater good of the song. This is what we're doing today. That's what I look forward to, and what I like about writing this record." Drummer Stephen Perkins stated, "When it's the first record that we've made in ten years, it’s got to be perfect, but then again perfect means also having some rough edges. You got to be dangerous with the sound. Me and Dave Navarro played without Perry for two or three months and just blew-up and found a new sound and then to innovate the record we just recorded demos and sent everything to Perry."

Guitarist Dave Navarro stated: "We're utilizing other instrumentation and new technologies, but our mental approach has remained wide open."

Describing his guitar contributions to The Great Escape Artist, Navarro noted that his "approach has become more melodic and simplistic. I'm not doing tons and tons of overdriven rhythm guitar tracks, and not a whole hell of lot of soloing that doesn't add to the melodic nature of a track. I've really been enjoying exploring different guitar textures in the studio." During recording, Navarro also stated: "My favorite guitar players from the '80s are probably the simplest players around, and I’m pretty inspired by them right now."

In an interview with Rolling Stone Farrell noted that the band has "enough material for three albums" and that he wants the tracks to "have a groove impact and hit you like an atom bomb. We've been doing that, so I feel like I'll die happy after this record."

Three of Duff McKagan's collaborations with the band appeared on the album ("Broken People," "Words Right Out of My Mouth" and "Ultimate Reason"). McKagan commented on his writing contributions stating: "My biggest concern was that if I was going to be involved, it had to be darker, and heavier, and more vicious than they've ever been before. I can't be seen as the bass player who came in and made them light, or made these really crappy songs. [...] We've got some really, really cool songs, some really heavy stuff. Really Pink Floyd'ish type stuff that meanders and goes out. I think with the right producer, these songs could be really, really special."

== Critical reception ==
Professional ratings
Aggregate scores
Source	Rating
Metacritic	55/100
Review scores
Source	Rating
The A.V. Club	F
AllMusic	3.5/5 stars
The Guardian	3/5 stars
Los Angeles Times	2.5/4 stars
NME	8/10
Pitchfork	5.0/10
PopMatters	3/10
Rolling Stone	2.5/5 stars
Slant Magazine	2.5/5 stars
Spin	6/10

The Great Escape Artist received "mixed or average" reviews based on 26 critics, according to Metacritic. Jason Heller of The A.V. Club was among the most critical, lambasting the album as "a bold, erratic, pathetic attempt to recontextualize Jane’s for the 21st century". Stuart Berman of Pitchfork Media described the album as "mired in the not-quite-rock/not-quite-ballad purgatory that defines so much post-grunge alt-radio" and lacking "Jane's Addiction's sense of playfulness, absurdity, and rhythmic verve." However, the album did win praise from some corners, with Stephen Thomas Erlewine of AllMusic describing The Great Escape Artist as "often touching upon the dark, boundless exotica of Nothing's Shocking yet managing to avoid desperation; instead of re-creating sounds, they've recaptured the vibe".

The album debuted at number 12 on the Billboard 200 chart. It dropped to number 67 during the second week.

== Track listing ==
All songs written and composed by Perry Farrell, Dave Navarro, Stephen Perkins, and David Sitek, except where noted.

The Great Escape Artist track listing
No.	Title	Writer(s)	Length
1.	"Underground"		3:07
2.	"End to the Lies"		3:31
3.	"Curiosity Kills"		4:29
4.	"Irresistible Force (Met the Immovable Object)"		4:00
5.	"I'll Hit You Back"		3:48
6.	"Twisted Tales"		4:29
7.	"Ultimate Reason"	Farrell, Navarro, Perkins, Duff McKagan	3:49
8.	"Splash a Little Water on It"		5:13
9.	"Broken People"	Farrell, Navarro, Perkins, McKagan	3:39
10.	"Words Right Out of My Mouth"	Farrell, Navarro, Perkins, McKagan	3:49
Total length:			39:54

Bonus CD: Live Performance From The 2011 Vive Latino Festival In Mexico City [Best Buy exclusive in U.S.]
No.	Title	Length
1.	"Whores"
2.	"Ain't No Right"
3.	"Ted, Just Admit It..."
4.	"Superhero"
5.	"End to the Lies"
6.	"Three Days"
7.	"Mountain Song"
8.	"Been Caught Stealing"
9.	"Ocean Size"
10.	"Jane Says"
11.	"Stop!"

== Personnel ==
Jane's Addiction

- Perry Farrell – lead vocals
- Dave Navarro – guitar, keyboards (1, 3, 5–10), bass
- Stephen Perkins – drums, percussion

Additional musicians

- David Andrew Sitek – bass (1–6, 8–10), keyboards (1, 3, 5–9), programming (1, 3, 5–10), additional rhythm guitar (2–4, 6, 8, 9)
- Chris Chaney – bass
- Master Musicians of Joujouka – rhaita and additional percussion (2)
- John Hill – additional keyboards (4–6)
- Jamie Muhoberac – additional keyboards (8)

Recording

- Rich Costey – producer, recording, mixing
- Perry Farrell – co-producer
- David Andrew Sitek – additional production
- Chris Kascyh – recording
- Charlie Stavish – recording
- Dustin Mosley – recording
- Chris Steffen – recording assistant
- Vlado Meller – mastering
- Mark Santangelo – mastering assistant

Artwork

- Matthew Goldman – album art direction
- Perry Farrell – cover art, character design, fabrication
- Adam Lawrence – miniature set design, fabrication
- Jedediah Cowyn Voltz – miniature props, art
- Jed Hathaway – on-set artist
- Tom Hester – additional character fabrication
- Brian Capati – additional character fabrication
- Bela Temesvary – cover photography
- Eliot Lee Hazel – band photography

== Charts ==
Chart performance for The Great Escape Artist
Chart (2011)	Peak position
Australian Albums (ARIA)	71
Canadian Albums (Nielsen SoundScan)	31
Finnish Albums (Suomen virallinen lista)	48
Irish Albums (IRMA)	74
Polish Albums (ZPAV)	42
Scottish Albums (OCC)	56
UK Albums (OCC)	52
US Billboard 200	12
US Indie Store Album Sales (Billboard)	4
US Top Alternative Albums (Billboard)	2
US Top Rock Albums (Billboard)	3
