= Jane's Addiction =

American rock band

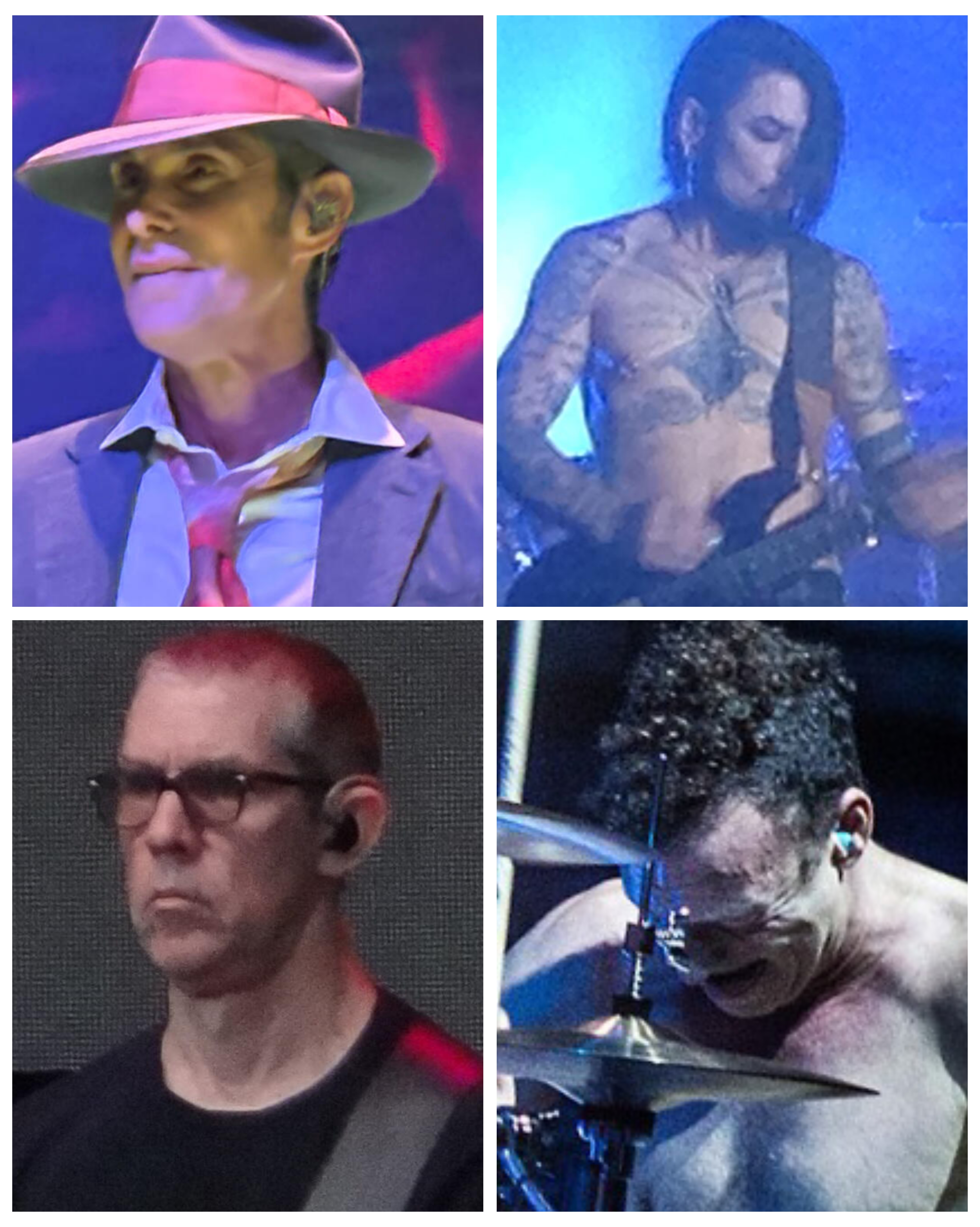
- Classic and final lineup of Jane's Addiction; Clockwise from top-left: Perry Farrell, Dave Navarro, Stephen Perkins and Eric Avery

Background information
- Origin: Los Angeles, California, U.S.
- Genres: Alternative rock; alternative metal; funk metal; psychedelic rock
- Works: Discography
- Years active: 1985–1991; 1997; 2001–2004; 2008–2025
- Labels: Warner Bros.; Capitol; EMI; Triple X
- Spinoffs: Porno for Pyros; Deconstruction; Banyan; The Panic Channel; Satellite Party
- Past members: Perry Farrell; Eric Avery; Chris Brinkman; Matt Chaikin; Stephen Perkins; Dave Navarro; Martyn LeNoble; Dave Sitek; Duff McKagan; Flea; Chris Chaney
- Website: janesaddiction.com

Jane's Addiction was an American rock band formed in Los Angeles in 1985. The band's best known line-up consisted of lead vocalist Perry Farrell, bassist Eric Avery, drummer Stephen Perkins and guitarist Dave Navarro. Jane's Addiction was one of the first bands from the early 1990s alternative rock movement to gain commercial success.

Founded by Farrell and Avery following the disintegration of Farrell's previous band Psi Com, Jane's Addiction's first release was their self-titled live album in 1987, which caught the attention of Warner Bros. Records. Their first two studio albums, Nothing's Shocking (1988) and Ritual de lo Habitual (1990), received acclaim and grew a cult fanbase. As a result, Jane's Addiction became a significant part of what Farrell dubbed the "alternative nation'" The band's first farewell tour in 1991 launched the first Lollapalooza.

In 1997, Jane's Addiction reunited, with Flea of the Red Hot Chili Peppers replacing Avery for a one-off tour. In 2001, a second reunion took place, with Martyn LeNoble and later Chris Chaney on bass. In 2003, Jane's Addiction released their third studio album, Strays, before dissolving the following year. In 2008, the original lineup reunited and embarked on a world tour. Avery left acrimoniously in early 2010 as they began working on new material. In 2011, they released their fourth studio album, The Great Escape Artist, with Chaney returning for its recording and tour. For the next ten years, the band toured and performed intermittently.

In 2022, Avery rejoined Jane's Addiction after a 12-year absence. Due to long COVID, Navarro was replaced by Queens of the Stone Age guitarist Troy Van Leeuwen and former Red Hot Chili Peppers guitarist Josh Klinghoffer on tours in 2022 and 2023. In 2024, a reunion tour with Navarro was cancelled after Farrell shoved and punched him on-stage during a concert on September 13, 2024, in Boston, Massachusetts. In January 2025, Navarro, Avery and Perkins announced they were working on new music without the involvement of Farrell. Jane's Addiction's fourth breakup was officially confirmed in December 2025.

== History ==
=== 1985–1987: Formation and Jane's Addiction ===
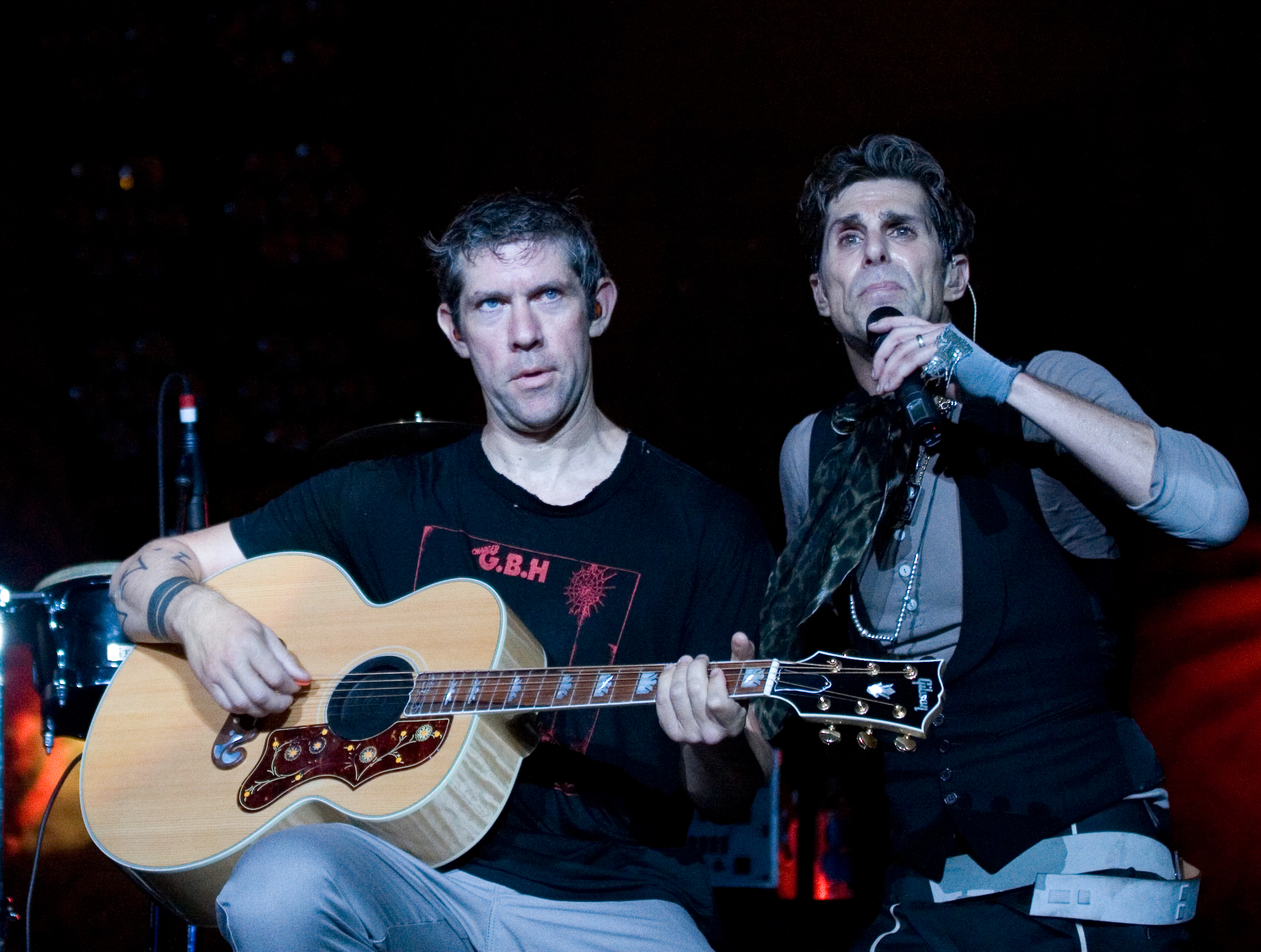
Founding members Eric Avery (left) and Perry Farrell (right) performing with the band in 2009

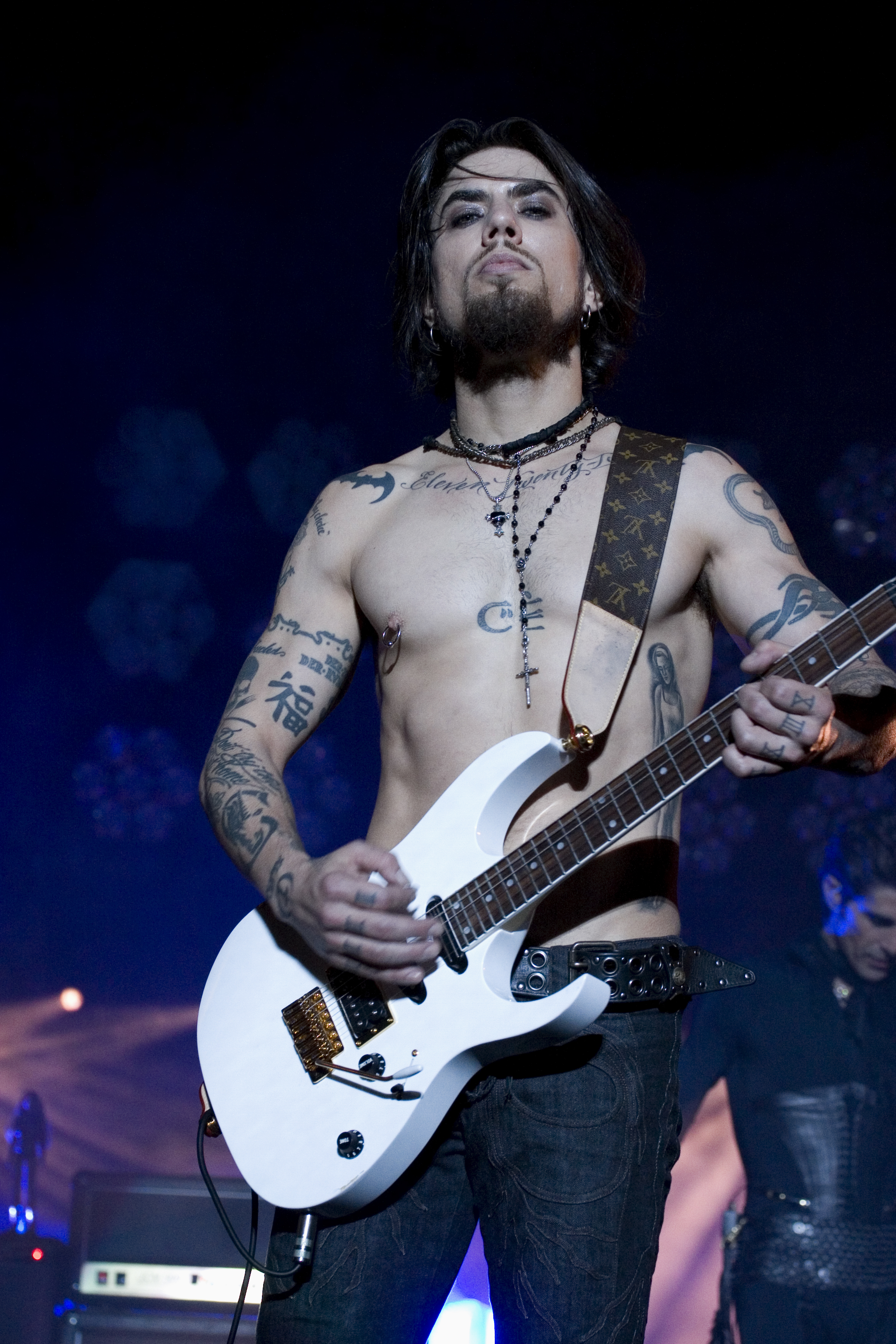
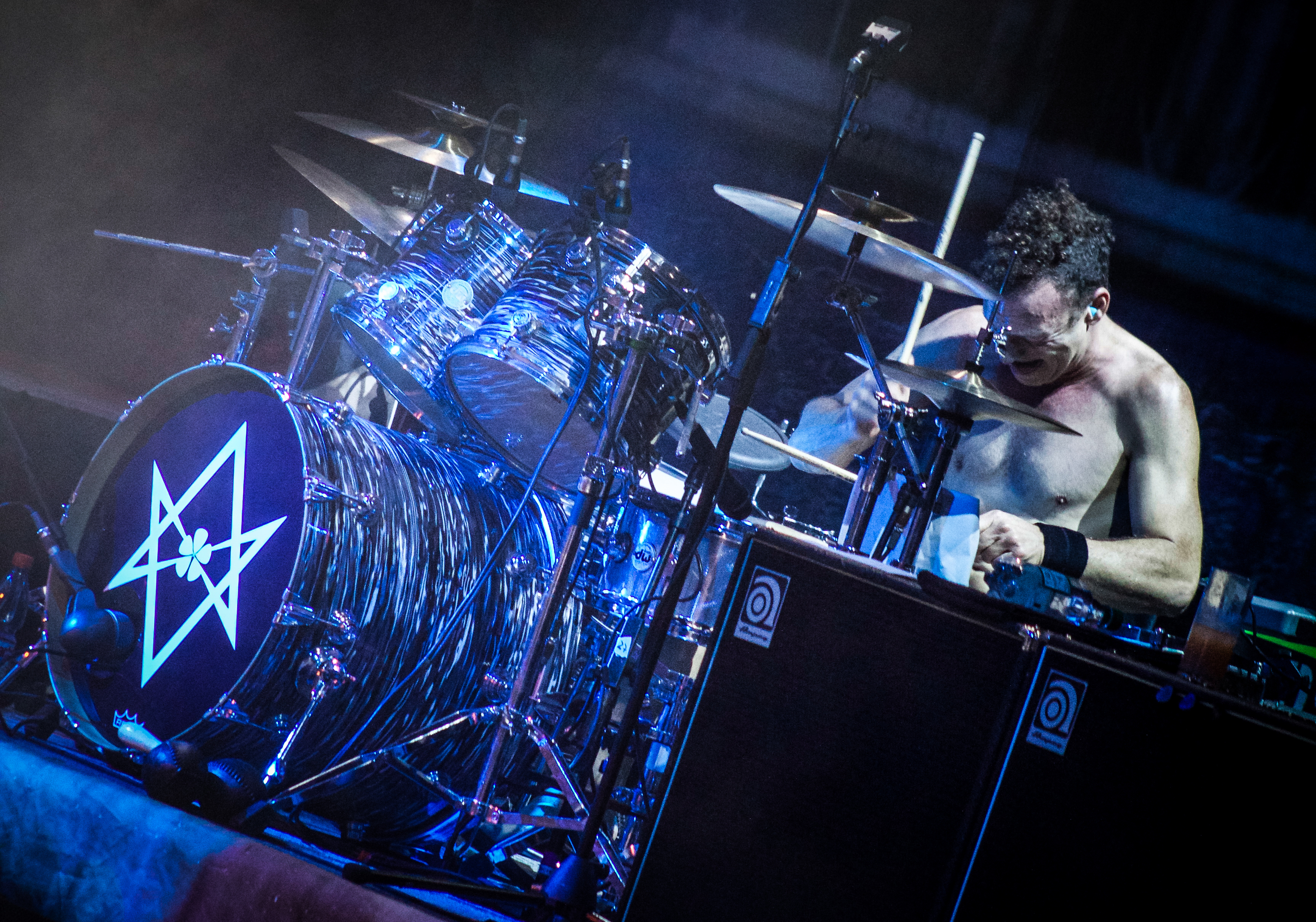
Dave Navarro (left) and Stephen Perkins (right), replaced early members Chris Brinkman and Matt Chaikin on guitar and drums, respectively, in 1986.

Jane's Addiction formed from the remains of frontman Perry Farrell's previous band, Psi Com. In mid-1985, Farrell was searching for a bassist to replace Kelly Wheeler in the faltering Psi Com. He was introduced to Eric Avery by Carla Bozulich (later of the Geraldine Fibbers), and the pair bonded over a mutual appreciation of Joy Division and the Velvet Underground. They began to practice together, although Avery never became a full-fledged member of Farrell's disintegrating group.

The new band was dubbed "Jane's Addiction" in honor of Farrell's housemate, Jane Bainter, who was their muse and inspiration. However, the play on words also seems to be there suggesting that "Jane's" signifies "Chains", being a synonym for addiction (i.e. a corrosive habit). "My girlfriend Casey Niccoli and I were sitting in the car," Farrell recalled, "and we started to think about band names. She threw in Jane's Heroin Experience. I thought it wasn't vague enough. If you want to invite people in, you don't want to put heroin on your door."

In its formative incarnation, Jane's Addiction went through four guitarists and featured Matt Chaikin, formerly of Kommunity FK, on drums.

After Chaikin failed to show up for rehearsals, Farrell sought a new drummer. Avery's younger sister Rebecca suggested her boyfriend Stephen Perkins. Avery was uncertain because of their differing tastes in music, but eventually relented. After Perkins was hired, the drummer and Rebecca promised to get their friend Dave Navarro into the group. Based on Perkins' recommendation, the band auditioned and hired Navarro.

Jane's Addiction became a sensation on the Los Angeles club scene, primarily headlining at Scream, and won interest from a variety of record labels, including independent record labels Triple X Records and Epitaph Records. While the group decided to sign with Warner Bros. Records, they insisted on releasing their debut on Triple X first. The band's manager negotiated the largest advance up to that point, with Warner Bros. signing the band for between $250,000 and $300,000. In January 1987, the band recorded its debut Jane's Addiction during a performance at the Roxy Theatre, at a cost of $4,000. Before the album's release, Jane's Addiction supported British band Love and Rockets on a two-month tour in late 1987. In late 1987, the band opened for former Bauhaus vocalist Peter Murphy at the now demolished Fender's Ballroom in Long Beach.

=== 1988–1989: Nothing's Shocking ===
In January 1988, Jane's Addiction went into the studio to record its major label debut and follow-up to Jane's Addiction, Nothing's Shocking. Warner Bros. gave Jane's Addiction a list of producers to choose from, and the group chose Dave Jerden.

Nothing's Shocking was released in 1988. "Mountain Song" was released as a single; MTV refused to air the song's music video because of a scene containing full frontal nudity. Farrell then decided to release the music video commercially with added live footage to create the Soul Kiss home video. Because of the lack of airplay on MTV and modern rock radio, the album only sold 200,000 to 250,000 copies in its first year of release.

After the album's release, the band went on tour, opening for Iggy Pop and The Ramones. By the end of the tour, Jane's Addiction was headlining clubs and theaters.

During the recording sessions, Farrell stated he wanted 50% of the band's publishing royalties for writing the lyrics, plus a quarter of the remaining half for writing music, adding up to 62.5%. Bassist Eric Avery said he and the other members – guitarist Dave Navarro and drummer Stephen Perkins – were stunned by these demands. Farrell refused to compromise. One day Jerden drove to the studio to find Farrell, Navarro, and Perkins leaving; Farrell told him the band had broken up and there would be no record. Warner Bros. called an emergency meeting to resolve the situation. Farrell received the royalty percentages he sought, with the other members receiving 12.5 percent each. Avery said the incident had a profound effect on the band, creating an internal fracture.

Not long after the royalties dispute, Farrell and Avery – who had cofounded the band – had a falling-out. This was the result of Avery's newfound sobriety as well as an incident in which Farrell believed Avery had drunkenly tried to pick up his girlfriend. "Unfortunately," Farrell recalled, "the tensions between Eric and I affected the whole family. Some people were asked to take sides, and others just moped about because they didn't know what was going on." Perkins, however, is reported to have gotten along with Navarro, Avery and Farrell.

=== 1989–1991: Ritual de lo Habitual ===
Jane's Addiction was scheduled to begin recording its next album in mid-1989. Navarro later stated he had almost no recollection of working on the album due to his addiction to heroin. Ritual de lo Habitual was released in 1990. To support it, the band embarked on a lengthy tour. Farrell recalled, "That thirteen-month tour behind Ritual was half the reason we wound up unable to stand one another. The other half is that I am an intolerable narcissist who can't get along with anyone."

Part of the tour included headlining the first Lollapalooza festival, which traveled across North America in mid-1991. The festival, created by Farrell and Marc Geiger, was to become a farewell for Jane's Addiction, but also a showcase for other cult artists: Siouxsie and the Banshees, Nine Inch Nails, the Butthole Surfers, Living Colour, the Rollins Band, the Violent Femmes, and Ice-T's Body Count. The headliners began to get more exposure than ever before: "Been Caught Stealing" and "Stop!" became hits and earned rotation on MTV. During the first Lollapalooza show, Farrell and Navarro got into a fight onstage after violently bumping each other mid-song. The band walked off, but came back to play an encore; however, the fight continued and Navarro eventually threw his guitar into the crowd. Regardless, the band continued the tour and played about 25 more Lollapalooza shows, frequently covering Sly and the Family Stone's "Don't Call Me Nigger, Whitey" with Ice-T and Body Count.

Differences between the members on the issue of drug use on the "Ritual" tour led to a schism: Farrell and Perkins regularly partook, while Avery and Navarro abstained. According to Spin, between shows, Avery and Navarro sought to avoid temptation by retiring to a section of the tour bus set aside for them. After shows, Avery and Navarro (and Navarro's wife at the time, Tanya) would retire to their hotel. "They have," said Spin, "simply learned that they cannot use drugs of any kind anymore without becoming slaves to them, and that slavery is death."

In late 1991, Avery told Navarro that he planned to leave. Navarro quickly agreed to do the same. The two told their management, who in turn tried to convince them to play in Japan, but Avery and Navarro only wanted to play as much as was contractually obligated. The band played its last shows in Australia and Hawaii before disbanding. "It's weird to be at the end of a cycle like that," remarked Avery, "having run the gamut of the usual 'rock story' from beginning to end: you get signed, get strung out, break up."

=== 1997: First reunion and Kettle Whistle ===
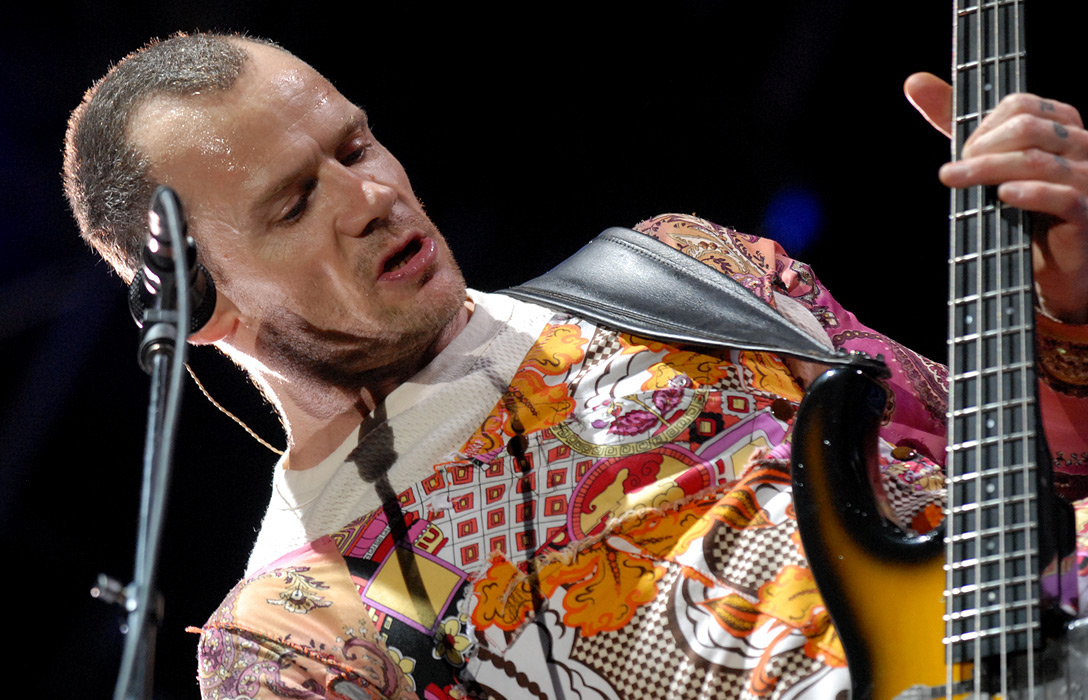
Flea of the Red Hot Chili Peppers, of whom Navarro was concurrently the guitarist of at the time, replaced Avery on bass during their first reunion in 1997, and played bass on two new songs on that year's compilation album Kettle Whistle. He had previously played the Trumpet on the Nothing's Shocking track "Idiots Rule" in 1988.

Dave Navarro joined the Red Hot Chili Peppers in 1993 and during a hiatus for the band, Navarro along with Chili Peppers's Flea joined Porno for Pyros to record "Hard Charger" in 1997 for Howard Stern's movie, Private Parts soundtrack. This led to a brief Jane's Addiction Relapse tour, with Flea replacing Avery who declined an invitation to rejoin the band. They produced a compilation album titled Kettle Whistle featuring two new songs with Flea on bass. In 2010, Perkins stated that "Flea, to me, was a great match in '97. As a drummer, he was very exciting for me to work with."

=== 2001–2004: Strays ===
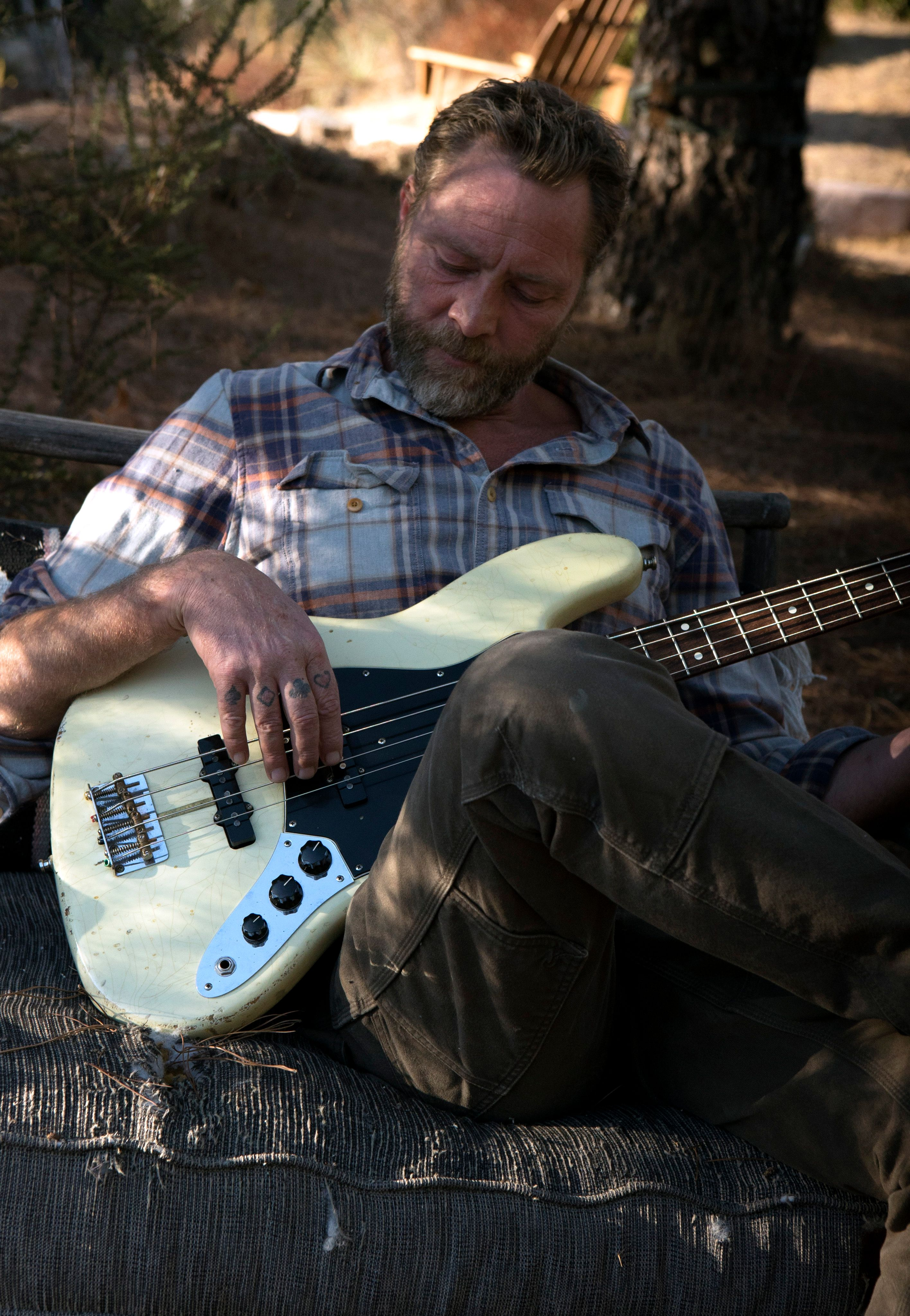
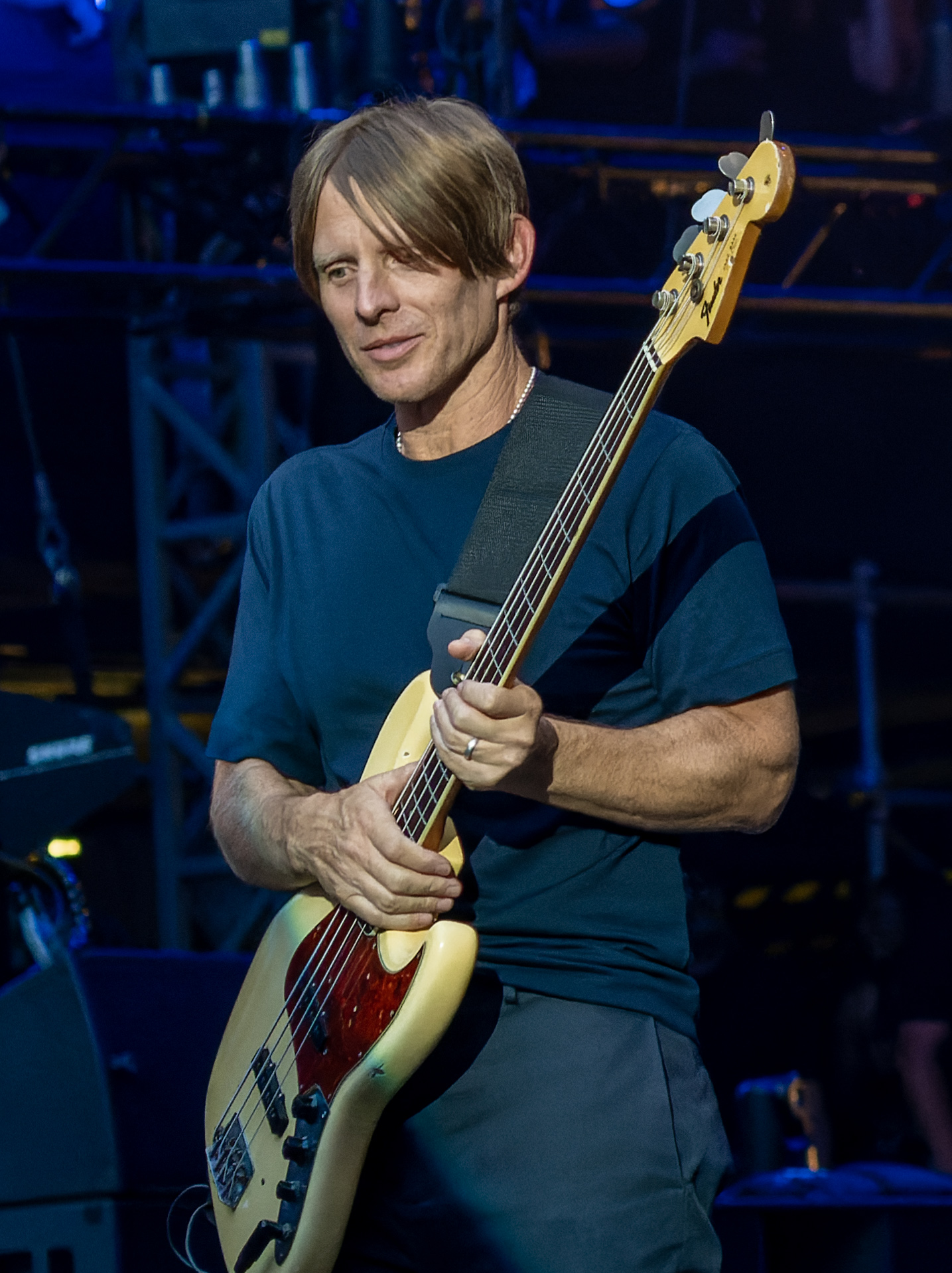
During the band's second reunion in 2001, former Porno for Pyros bassist Martyn LeNoble (left), replaced Flea on bass, before being replaced in turn the following year by veteran bassist Chris Chaney, formerly of Alanis Morissette's backing band, who would appear on the band's third studio album Strays in 2003, the only studio album by the band to entirely feature Chaney on bass, and remained with the band until their third breakup the following year.

"I got a phone call from a promoter who asked me if I would be interested in re-forming the band for the Coachella festival in LA," said Farrell in 2001, "and taking the band on tour after that... This comes at a time when this record Song Yet to Be Sung is about to be plucked. Perkins played on three of the songs, and Navarro played with Steve on the single. So there are plans for Jane's' summer tour."

The consequent 2001 Jubilee Tour featured largely the classics, alongside "Hungry" from Navarro's Trust No One and "Happy Birthday Jubilee" from Song Yet to Be Sung. Fans were told to expect a "Sexual Psycho Circus... half-naked, penny rafters, guitar solos, and tribal drums..." Indeed, during 'Classic Girl', scantily clad stage dancers filled the arenas. Avery declined to be involved. Since Flea was busy with the Chili Peppers, Porno for Pyros bassist Martyn LeNoble was enlisted. (Fellow Pyros member Peter DiStefano guested at one show, to play "Pets".)

Following the success of this tour, the band decided to record a follow-up album to Ritual de lo Habitual and tapped Chris Chaney to replace LeNoble on bass. They entered the studio with producer Bob Ezrin in 2001, recording as a band for the first time in over 10 years. The result was a fourth album, Strays. Some of the songs (or parts of songs) dated far back in the band's history, while others were new. Reaction was generally favorable, with Rolling Stone reporting that "The band sounds familiar" and "beefier" though without the "glint of madness" of the original line-up. The first single, "Just Because", reached number 72 on the Billboard Hot 100, while "Superhero" garnered exposure as the theme for HBO's hit series Entourage.

The band spent 2003 on an extensive worldwide tour in support of Strays, including a summer headliner slot in a reincarnated Lollapalooza U.S. tour. Following this homecoming of sorts, Jane's Addiction once again broke up towards the end of 2003 after canceling several dates. Although details surrounding the band's demise are sparse, Navarro claimed on his website, in June 2004, that the reasons were essentially the same as they were in 1991. Perkins later stated, "We always break up if it's not real. We really can't fake it, We can make a million dollars for three months touring but we would fucking hate each other, which isn't good. Even with the nostalgia, it's not worth it if it doesn't sound good, or look good. One of the things with Jane's is that we have never been good at faking it."

A hits album – Up from the Catacombs – The Best of Jane's Addiction – was released on September 19, 2006.

=== 2008–2010: Return of Eric Avery and NIN/JA Tour ===
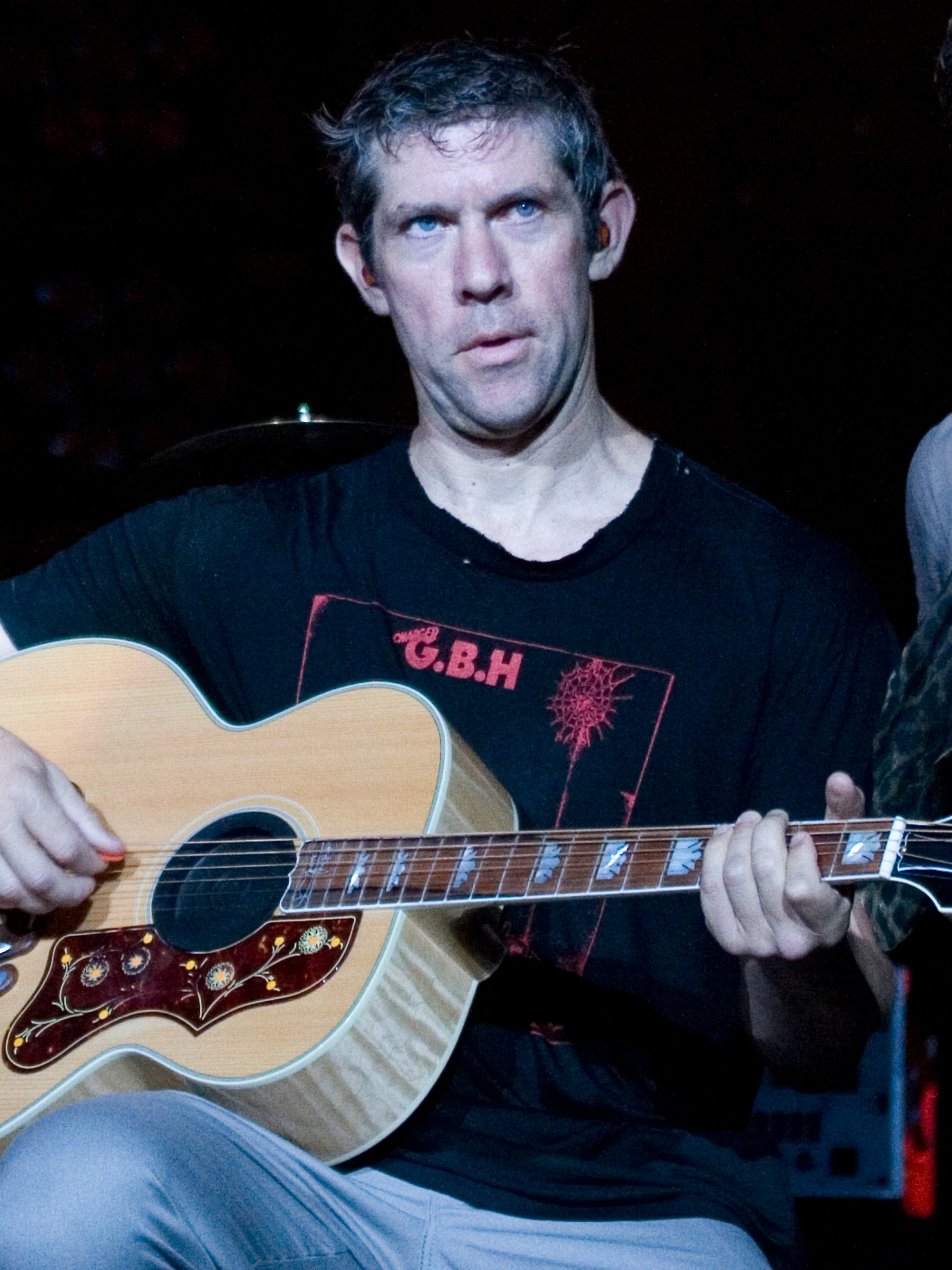
Original bassist and co-founding member Eric Avery rejoined the band during their third reformation in 2008 before leaving the band again in 2010.

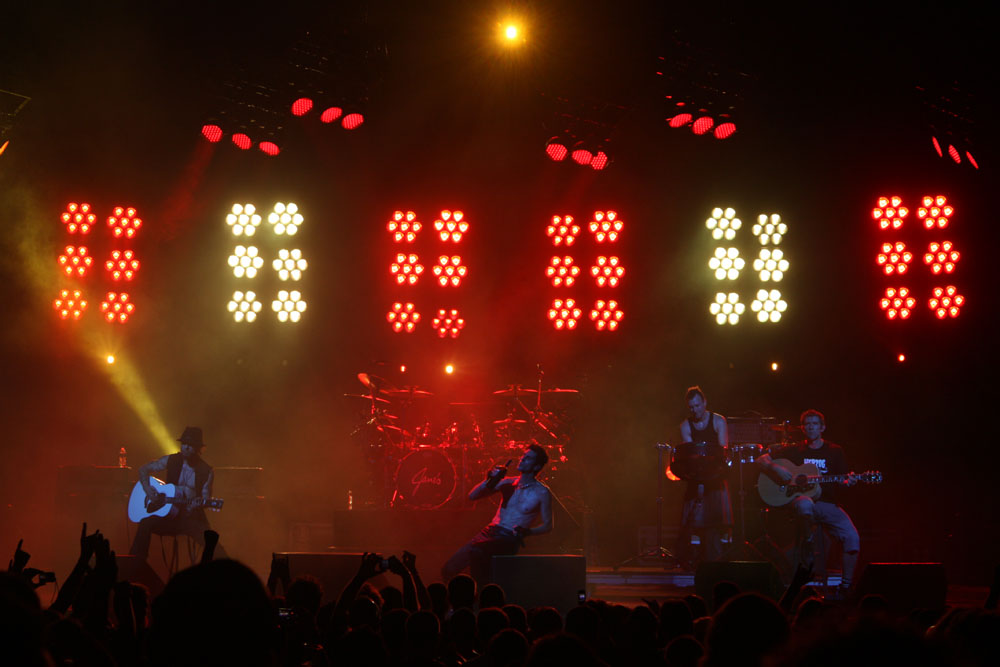
Jane's Addiction performing at Verizon Amphitheater in Charlotte, North Carolina in 2009

Jane's Addiction performed at the first-ever NME Awards USA on April 23, 2008, with the reunited core line-up of Perry Farrell, Dave Navarro, Eric Avery, and Stephen Perkins. This was the first performance with bassist Eric Avery since 1991, taking place after their acceptance speech for the "Godlike Genius Award". To follow this up, the original line up performed their first full set in 17 years in Los Angeles on October 23, 2008, at La Cita Bar, and played two further club gigs at the El Cid in Los Angeles on November 20. and the Echoplex on February 16, 2009. On April 11, 2009, they had a birthday bash for Perry that included members of Jane's Addiction and Porno for Pyros on the same stage; the bash was nicknamed Perrypalooza.

Around this time, photos of Farrell, Navarro, Avery and Perkins, taken by Trent Reznor, appeared on Nine Inch Nails' official website, leading to speculation that Reznor could be helping Jane's Addiction record new material. "He did his best to be both producer and psychologist," Farrell said, in a Billboard report about tension between himself and Avery. "He was very respectful, trying to get out of the way and not overproduce. I wish honestly he would've produced a little more, but he was a little gun-shy after seeing us explode on each other in the studio. He became the referee for a day and after that day I think he was done." Nonetheless, Reznor subsequently posted a blog entry announcing that Jane's Addiction would accompany Nine Inch Nails on their summer 2009 tour, which kicked off on May 8 in West Palm Beach, Florida.

To accompany the tour, newly recorded versions of "Chip Away" and "Whores" were released for free via the official tour website. Farrell explained: "To get some creative juice flowing, we went into the studio for about two weeks. We had the idea to re-record two tunes, just because they'd never been done officially in the studio. And we had some fun writing some new things. A handful that are close to finished, but not quite done. But there's no rush to put anything out at this point." Navarro blogged: "We wanted to give our longtime listeners something to celebrate the tour and 'Whores' has always been one of the tracks that defined Jane's early on."

A retrospective box set, A Cabinet of Curiosities, was released to coincide with the NIN/JA tour in April 2009.

In July 2009, Jane's Addiction was scheduled to play the Splendour in the Grass festival in Australia when a health issue forced a last-minute cancellation. Music Feeds reports that an arm infection, probably that of drummer Stephen Perkins, is the cause of the cancellation. The entire Australian leg of the Jane's Addiction 2009 world tour was cancelled, though Jane's Addiction would play the next year's Splendour in the Grass.

Jane's Addiction performed at the 2009 Voodoo Fest held at City Park in New Orleans, Louisiana over Halloween weekend. The concert was filmed and a year later released as Live Voodoo DVD, which received mixed reviews. "It all falls rather flat, a two-dimensional sound robbing the likes of 'Ocean Size' and 'Ted, Just Admit It' of any sense of dynamics," Phil Mongredien of Q wrote.

Jane's Addiction returned to Australia in February 2010 for the Soundwave Festival. Avery left the band following the festival, stating: "That's it. With equal parts regret and relief, the Jane's Addiction experiment is at an end."

=== 2010–2012: The Great Escape Artist ===
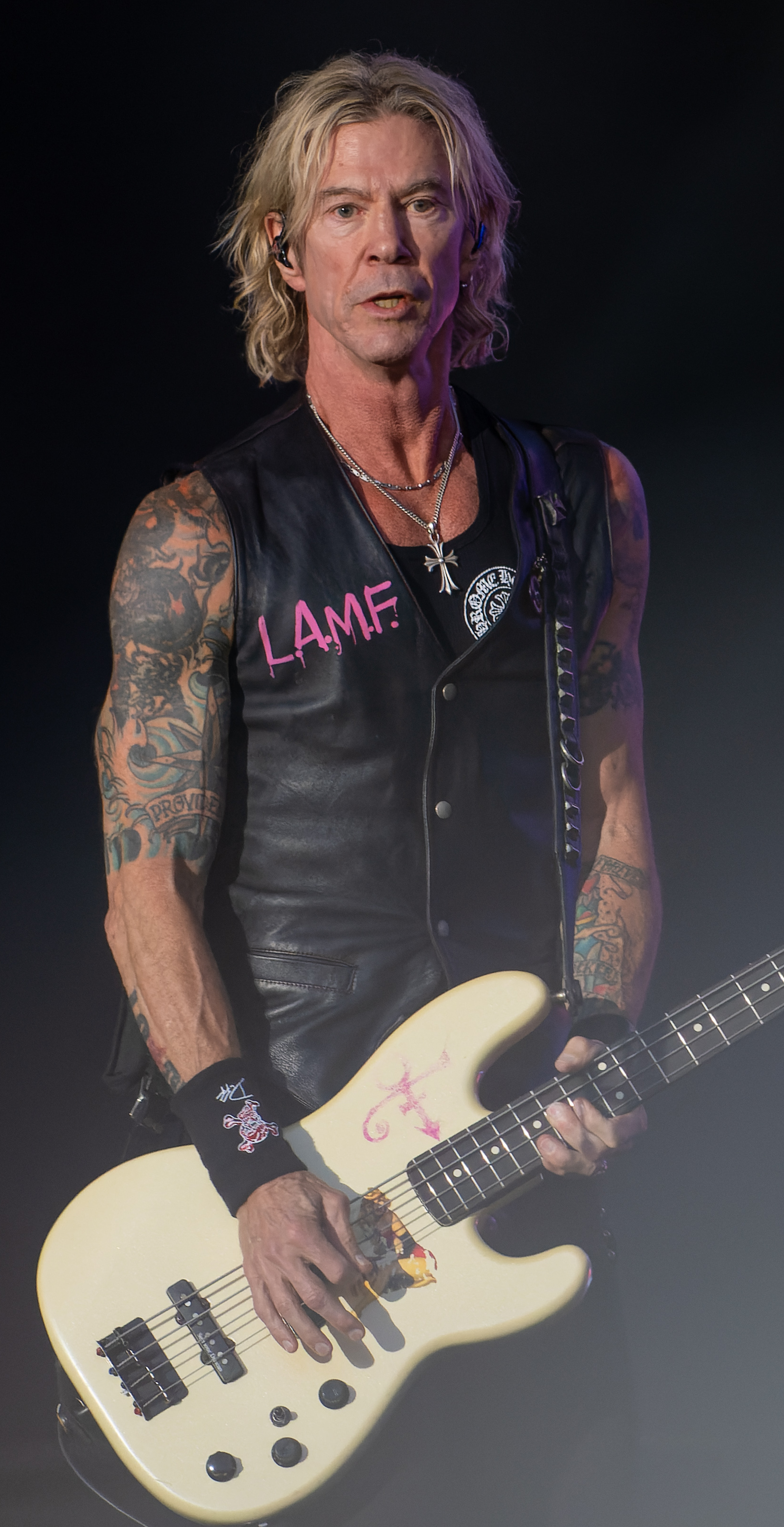
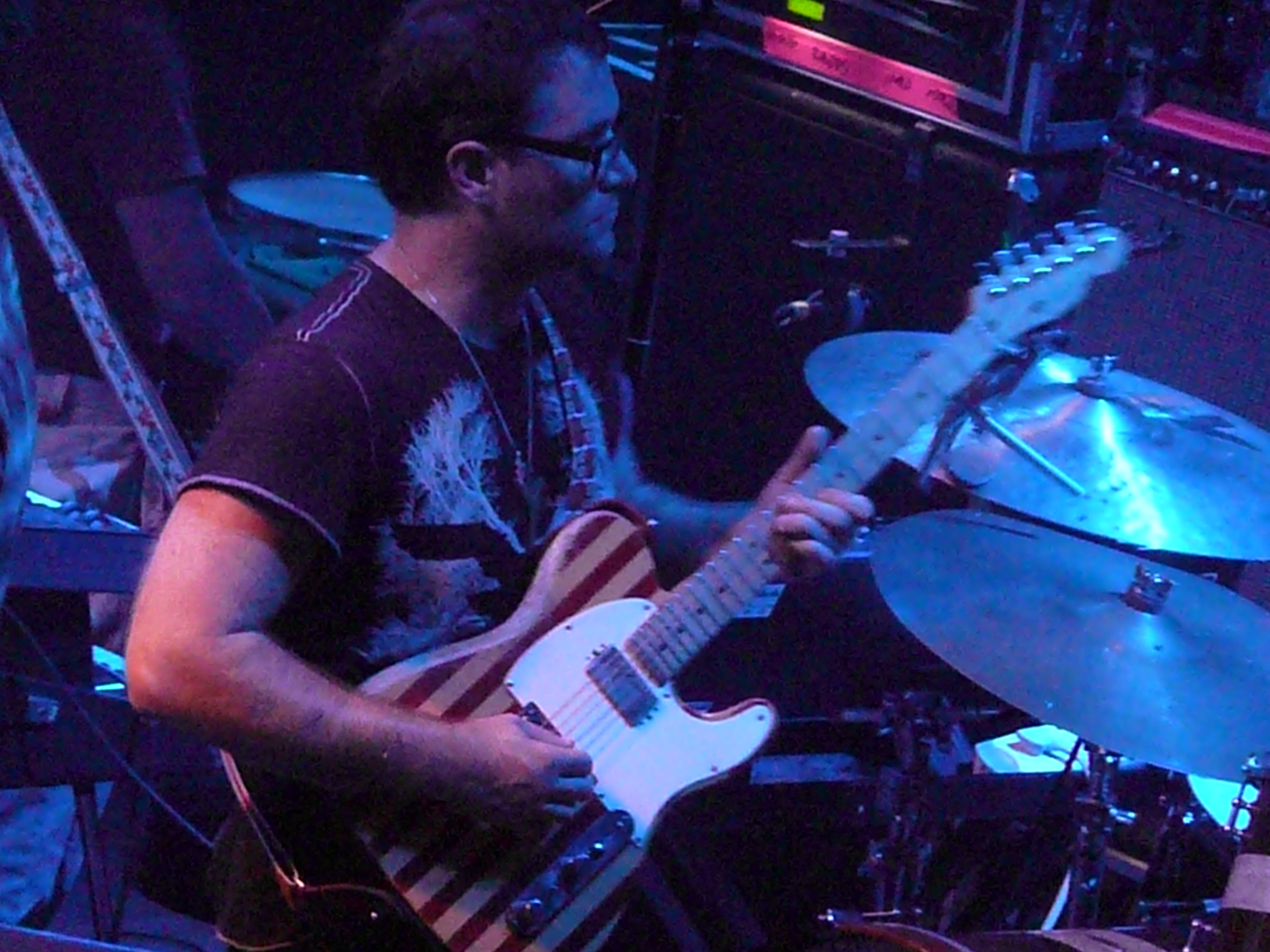
Following Avery's second departure in 2010, he was briefly replaced by Guns N' Roses bassist Duff McKagan (left), who was replaced by TV on the Radio's Dave Sitek (right) in turn, who partly performed on the band's fourth and final studio album The Great Escape Artist (2011), before Chaney returned the following year and remained with the band until Avery rejoined again in 2022.

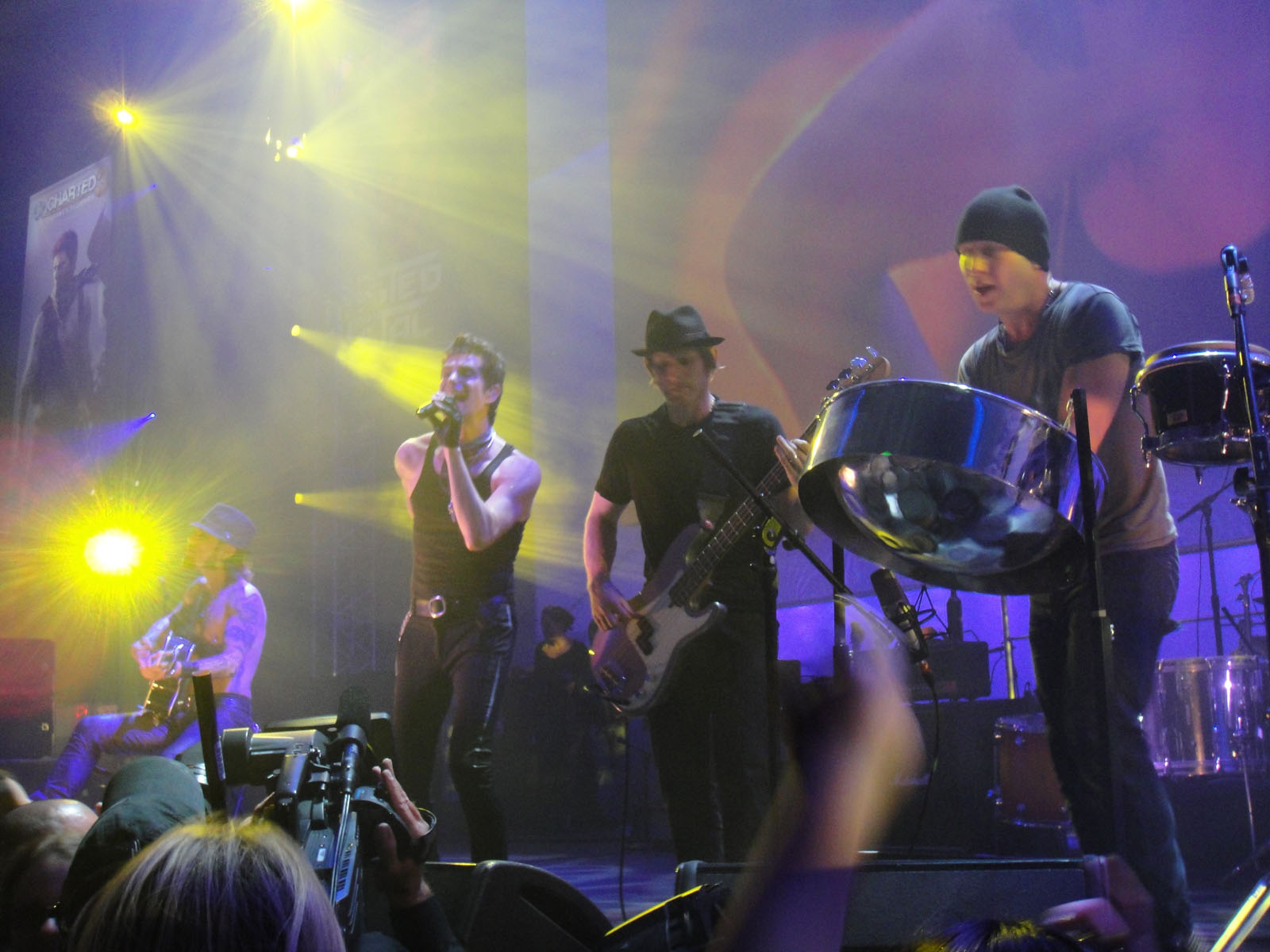
Jane's Addiction performing at E3 2011

The band began working with Guns N' Roses bassist Duff McKagan on new material. with a picture of the group working together posted on Navarro's Twitter page. It was later confirmed by Dave Navarro on his Dark Matter radio program that McKagan had indeed joined Jane's Addiction on a permanent basis.

The new lineup of Jane's Addiction made their debut, performing at singer Perry Farrell's 51st birthday celebration, at Les Deux in Los Angeles, California on March 30.

In April 2010, the group announced two European dates, scheduled for June, taking place at the GelreDome, in Arnhem, Netherlands, and an appearance at the Rock in Rio in Madrid, Spain. Preceding these shows in Europe was a one-off Cinco de Mayo concert that took place at the Bardot in Hollywood, California on Wednesday, May 5, 2010. During the show, they debuted a new song titled "Soulmate". In September 2010 McKagan left the band.

On September 25, 2010, Jane's Addiction performed a live set for "Guitar Center Sessions" on DirecTV. The episode included an interview with the band by program host, Nic Harcourt.

On January 5, 2011, the band announced that they had recruited TV on the Radio guitarist and producer Dave Sitek as a replacement for Duff McKagan. Sitek was set to record the bass for the band's fourth studio album, entitled The Great Escape Artist. On January 14, 2011, while talking about the recording of the new album, drummer Stephen Perkins mentioned that although Sitek was a "stabilizing force" for Jane's Addiction, and was to appear on the upcoming album, he was not the band's full-time bassist as was previously reported. It was then confirmed that Sitek would not be touring with the band, which was set to promote the album on a summer tour, including headlining Reading and Leeds Festivals. These sets would later be cancelled due to Farrell's illness. It was then announced that Chris Chaney would be the band's live bassist for some shows in 2011. On March 30, 2011, a song from The Great Escape Artist, titled "End to the Lies" was premiered on the Chilean radio station Radio Futuro, and was also performed at Lollapalooza Chile on April 3, 2011. On April 8, "End to the Lies" was released via their website as free to download. On July 23, 2011, the band headlined the Gathering of the Vibes Music and Arts festival in Bridgeport, Connecticut. On August 3, 2011, the band released the second single entitled "Irresistible Force". The initial release date for new album was scheduled for September 27, 2011, but was postponed until October. The Great Escape Artist was released on October 18, 2011. In an interview with Jason Tanamor, guitarist Dave Navarro said, "This album is different because the band went in a new direction that we haven't been in before but at the same time there are many familiar threads of where we used to come from. It's an evolution from where we were but always remembering where we came from."

Jane's Addiction launched their Theatre of the Escapists Tour in 2012 to a sold-out crowd at the 2,000 seat Pageant Theatre in St. Louis, Missouri. In February 2012, Perry Farrell discussed the possibility of releasing a follow-up to The Great Escape Artist while touring in support of the album, stating, "What I have not seen before is a group that's done a record, had somewhat of a theme – escapism – and then done a second record almost as if it was a follow-up movie. I want to do that. We have material left from The Great Escape Artist we didn't record. I'm very inspired to keep with the theme. Something's feeling right about it."

In 2012, the band contributed a studio cover of the Rolling Stones' 1968 song "Sympathy for the Devil" to the television series Sons of Anarchy.

=== 2013–2021: Continued activity and anniversary touring ===
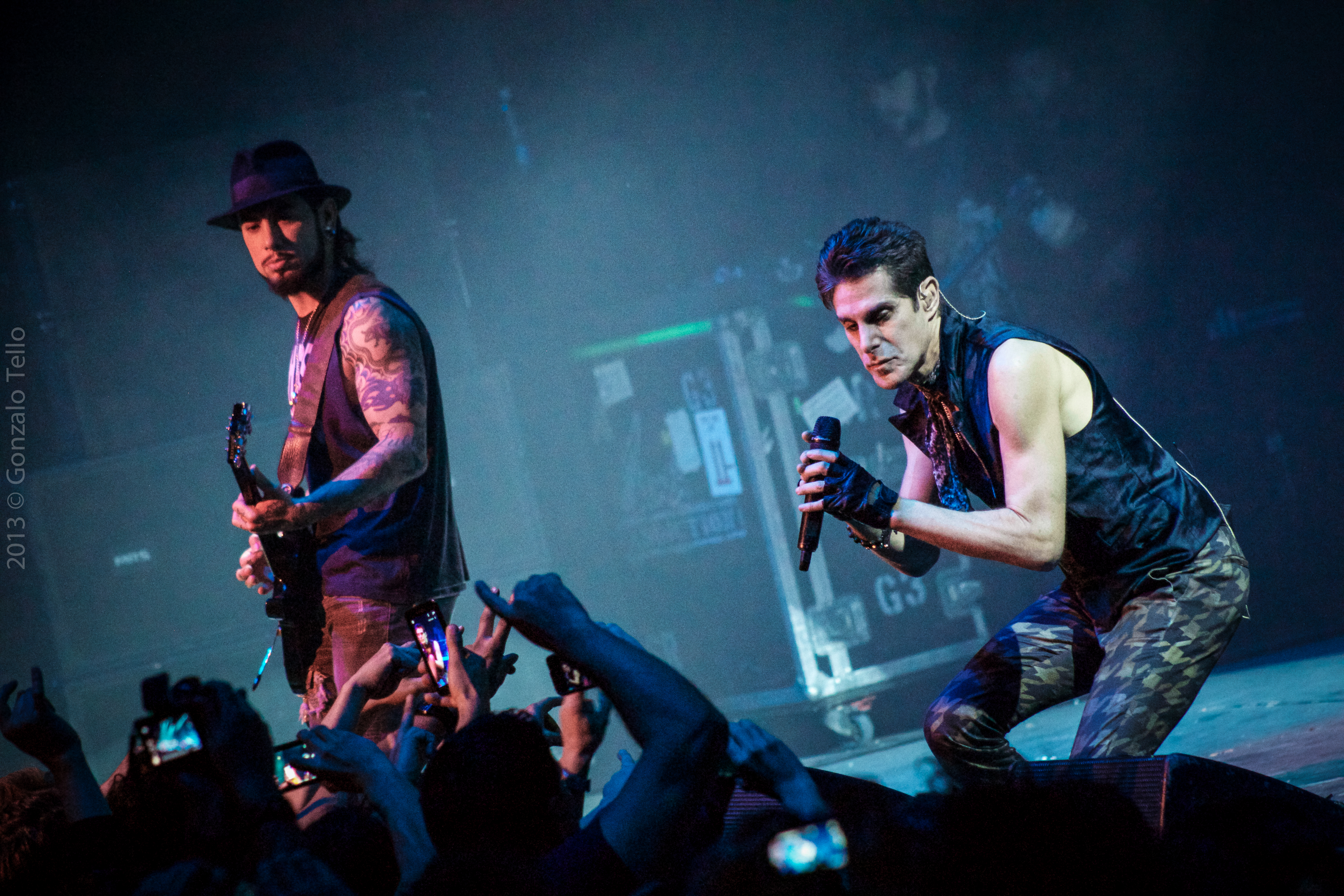
Dave Navarro and Perry Farrell, 2013

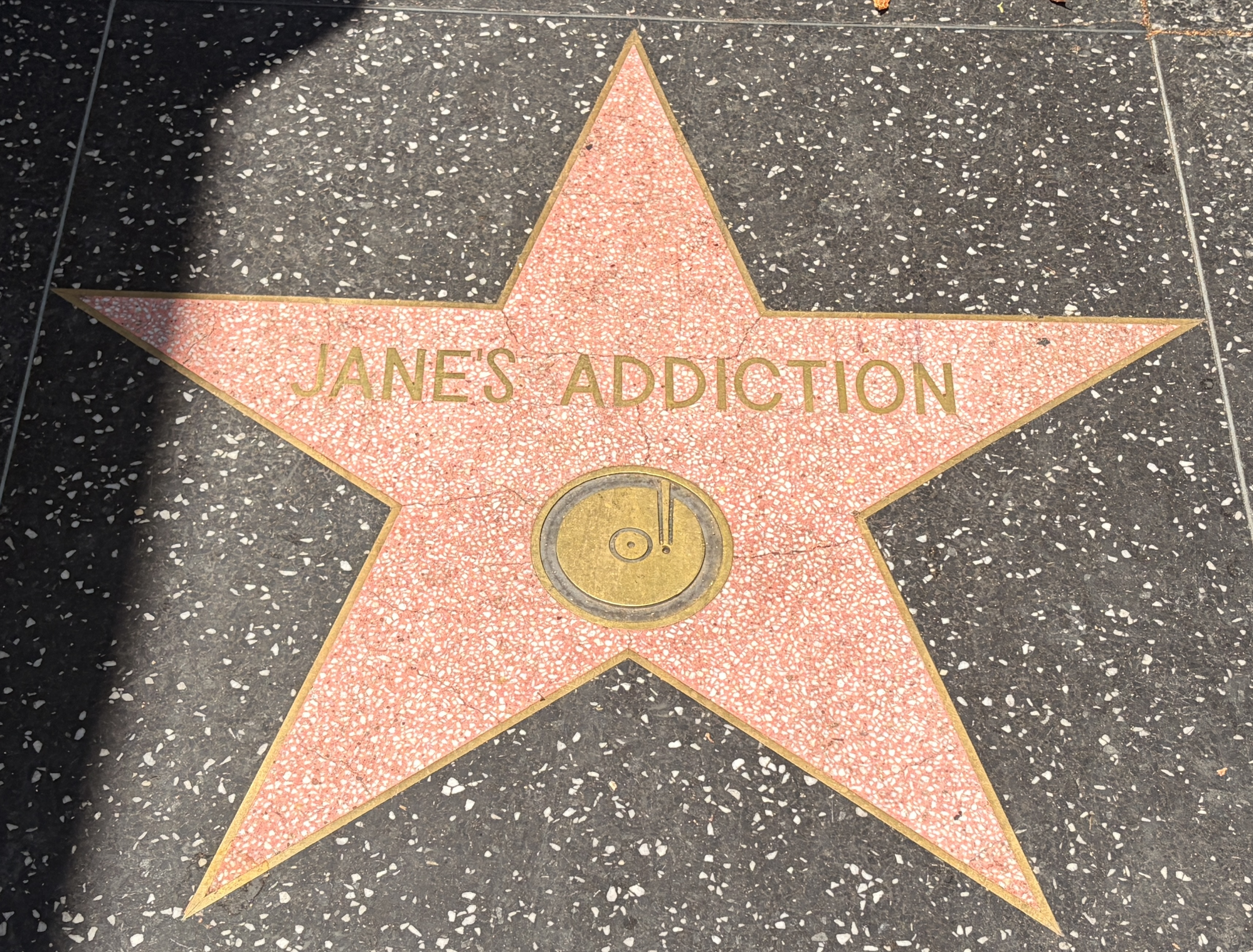
Hollywood Walk of Fame star

After finishing up touring in support of The Great Escape Artist, the band remained active with several subsequent tours, releases and band-related projects. They released their second live album, Live in NYC, on July 8, 2013, recorded during their "Theatre of Escapists" tour. On August 8, 2013, they released a stand-alone studio single, called "Another Soulmate", which they had previously performed live during Duff McKagen's brief tenure as bass guitarist in 2010. Later that year, Jane's Addiction was awarded with the 2,509th star of the Hollywood Walk of Fame on October 30, 2013. Their star is located at 6436 Hollywood Boulevard.

In 2014, the band embarked upon a tour performing Nothing's Shocking in full. In 2016, they launched the Sterling Spoon Anniversary Tour, celebrating the 25th anniversary of Ritual De Lo Habitual and Lollapalooza. Special guests on the tour included Dinosaur Jr., Living Colour, and Fishbone. A live album from this tour, Alive at Twenty-Five, was released on August 4, 2017.

On February 6, 2020, ten seconds of a song entitled "Laughing Beats" (also referred to as "Embrace the Darkness") was played by Dave Navarro's guitar tech Dan Cleary on Rare Form Radio. The song was recorded with Eric Avery and produced by Trent Reznor in 2009, prompting speculation that the song could be released in full in the near future.

On February 8, 2020, Jane's Addiction performed for the first time in over two years at a memorial show for Andrew Burkle, son of billionaire Ronald Burkle, who died in January 2020. The band was joined on stage by John Frusciante for "Mountain Song". Frusciante was there performing with the Red Hot Chili Peppers for the first time in 13 years after recently rejoining the band. Stephen Perkins also filled in for Chili Peppers drummer Chad Smith during their performance due to Smith being unable to attend due to an art show appearance.

=== 2022–2023: Eric Avery's second return and Navarro's hiatus ===
On May 11, 2022, the Smashing Pumpkins announced the Spirits on Fire Tour, a 32-date trek across America with Jane's Addiction, starting in Dallas on October 2 and wrapping up in Los Angeles at the Hollywood Bowl on November 19. After contracting COVID-19 in December 2021, Dave Navarro continued to suffer health complications from long COVID, causing the band to cancel their planned summer festival appearances at Welcome to Rockville and Lollapallooza. Farrell and Perkins reformed Porno for Pyros to replace the band at both events, leading to a full reunion of Porno for Pyros' original line-up.

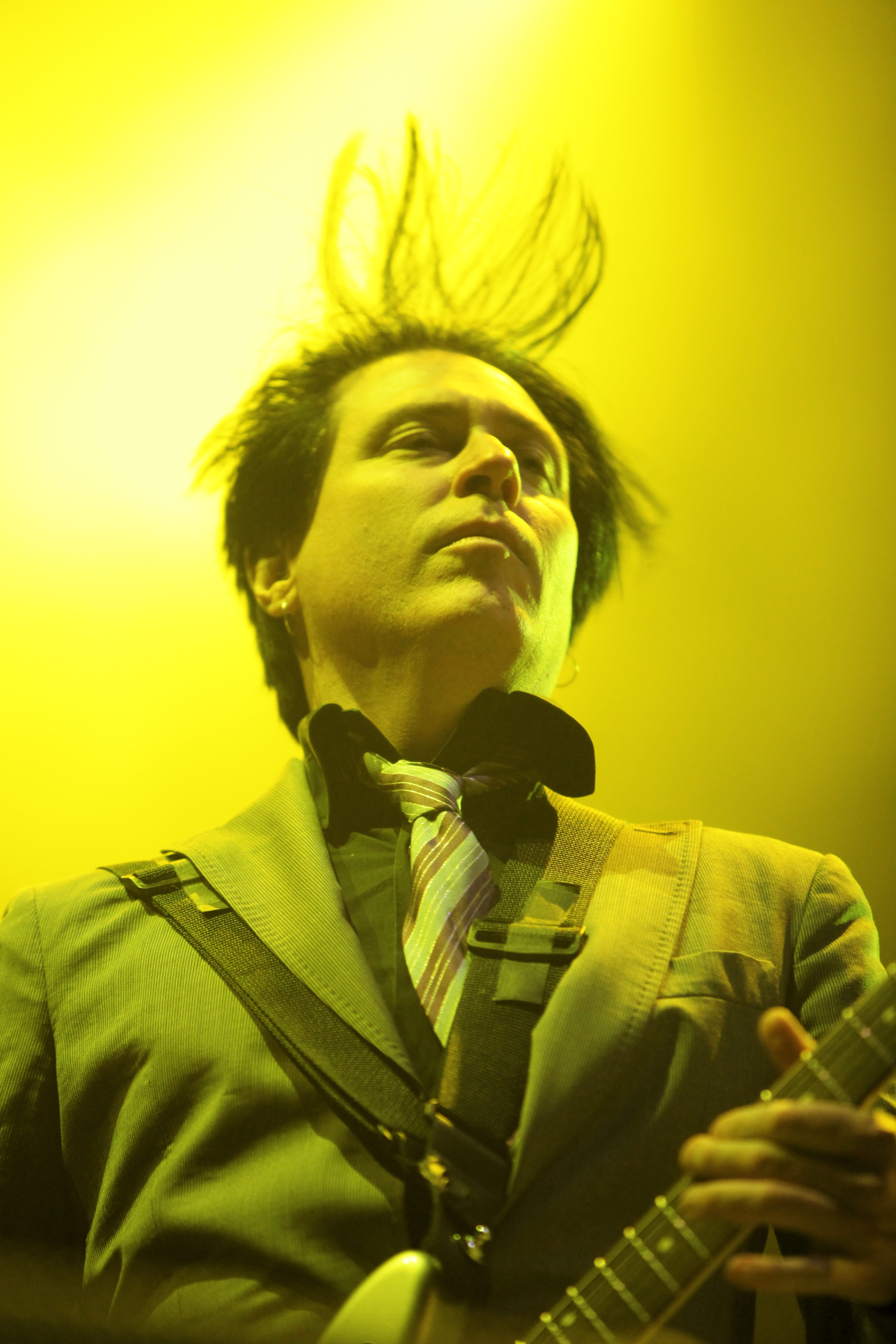
Guitarist Troy Van Leeuwen joined the band for its Spirits on Fire tour, filling in for Dave Navarro.

Upon reuniting Porno for Pyros, Perry Farrell stated that he would also like to see Jane's Addiction record new material in 2022 in addition to touring. On August 17, 2022, the band revealed on Instagram that founding bass guitarist Eric Avery had returned to Jane's Addiction after a twelve-year absence. Later that week, Avery confirmed that the band were working on new material: "Four promising new song ideas. Big thanks to you all for all the kind words of support. It leaves me feeling inspired. Honestly. It produces the best kind of pressure, your passion leaves me determined to do all I can for Jane's Addiction."

Avery's surprise return was revealed to have been tentatively in the works since 2020, with Foo Fighters drummer Taylor Hawkins helping facilitate phone calls between Farrell and Avery for a possible reunion in honor of Lollapalooza's 30th anniversary in 2021. Farrell envisioned the band becoming a five-piece with then-current bass guitarist Chris Chaney remaining in the band alongside Avery. Avery resisted the scenario, and despite Farrell and Avery coming to a peaceful understanding with one another, the original line-up of Jane's Addiction did not reunite due to the ongoing COVID-19 pandemic.

Following Taylor Hawkins' death in March 2022, Farrell reached out to Avery: "He presented this idea of me returning to Jane's, and how we would do it. He was like, 'Here's a few years' plan of how to return some luster to Jane's Addiction.' It involved writing new music and playing shows. I told him that I'd take the next step, whatever that is." Avery elaborated, "We had what I considered to be the most meaningful and honest and respectful talk that we've had since the Jane's 1.0 days. I don't mean to sound so 'new age-y' about it, but it was sort of a healing of a rift." With Avery returning to the band, Chaney was let go after an eleven-year tenure. The split became acrimonious between Farrell and Chaney: "Chris knew that this day would come because we talked about it. When Taylor died, things really changed in our relationship. We can definitely call it 'estranged.' I do not have a good separation with Chris Chaney, that's for sure."

Days prior to the band's Spirits on Fire tour with the Smashing Pumpkins, Dave Navarro announced that he wouldn't be performing with the band due to his ongoing struggles with long COVID: "I had hoped for a full recovery by October but I am still very fatigued and will not be able to join this leg. I am personally gutted as our original bass player has returned, Eric Avery. We wanted to bring you the original line-up but that will have to wait until I am recovered. While the band is touring, I will be working on some new Jane's material in the studio here in LA." For the duration of the tour, Navarro was replaced by Queens of the Stone Age guitarist Troy Van Leeuwen, with Navarro noting: "He is a great guy and I am honoured to have him help make this tour happen." Avery remarked: "Troy is much grittier in every way. There's sort of like a working-man grit to his playing, and to his sound," elaborating, "This is an opportunity for Jane's to have a little bit of a different sound. A little bit of a different experience." As the tour progressed, former Red Hot Chili Peppers guitarist Josh Klinghoffer and Bauhaus' Daniel Ash joined the band for select moments during the set, with Farrell noting: "They're guitar peers, shall we say, of Jane's. Friends first and foremost, but musical allies for sure."

Following the completion of the tour, the band entered the studio with producers James Ford and Peter Robinson to work on new material. Farrell, Avery and Perkins contributed to the recordings as a trio, with open invitations offered to Navarro and recent touring guitarists Van Leeuwen, Klinghoffer and Ash to work on the new material. Farrell noted: "I don't know who will end up recording the guitar tracks, but I'd love to see Dave, Troy, Josh and Daniel contribute — all the guys on the tour that really stuck it out." In January 2023, Klinghoffer was announced as Navarro's full replacement for their 2023 tour dates.

=== 2024–2025: Reunion tour, stage altercation and breakup ===
On May 23, 2024, the classic Jane's Addiction line-up of Farrell, Navarro, Avery and Perkins performed at the 400-capacity Bush Hall in London, marking the first time the four-piece had performed together since 2010. The band debuted new material at the show, their first with Avery in thirty-four years, ahead of a full European tour. Both The Guardian and NME, awarded five-star reviews to the band's performance at London's Roundhouse, with The Guardian writing: "They've not sounded this vivid and alive in decades. It might finally be time to believe in Jane's Addiction again – after all, they clearly do," and NME describing them as "a force to be reckoned with". Navarro said "some of those UK club dates are among my favorite Jane's Addiction shows that I've ever played".

Jane's Addiction announced a US tour, with support from Love and Rockets, with whom the band had previously toured in 1987. On July 24, 2024, they released the single "Imminent Redemption", the first original song with Avery in 34 years. The band stated: "It is different this time. To have everyone back together, releasing new music. It's time. Welcome to the next chapter of Jane's Addiction. 'Imminent Redemption' is only the beginning." The band confirmed that they had been working on several other new songs, with Avery saying he was "guardedly optimistic" that they could complete new music: "The phrase that Dave and I were talking about the other day is: 'If there is a Jane's Addiction in 2025, then there will be new music for sure.' But you just never know if there's going to be a band at all."

The Guardian reported that there were tensions between band members when they played in New York City in September. On September 13, a concert at Leader Bank Pavilion in Boston was cut short after Farrell shoved and punched Navarro and was restrained by the crew members. Farrell's wife, Etty Lau Farrell, said Farrell had been suffering from tinnitus and a sore throat and felt his voice was being drowned out by the band. The following day, Jane's Addiction issued an apology and canceled their scheduled show at Bridgeport, Connecticut. On September 16, they canceled the remainder of the tour and said they would "take some time away as a group". Navarro, Avery and Perkins released a joint statement attributing the cancellation to Farrell's behavior and mental health, while Farrell released an apology of his own, saying his behavior was "inexcusable".

On September 18, the band released a second new song with the reunited line-up, "True Love", which had been scheduled for release prior to the band's split. After several months of inactivity, on December 25, Navarro and Avery re-released their 1994 Deconstruction album on music streaming services for the first time, with Spin naming it a "quiet masterpiece" in an accompanying feature. On January 3, 2025, it was revealed that Avery, Navarro and Perkins were working on new music together, without the participation of Farrell. In May 2025, Navarro stated that there was "no chance" the band would reunite.

In July 2025, Avery, Navarro, and Perkins sued Farrell for assault, battery, intentional infliction of emotional distress, negligence, breach of fiduciary duty, and breach of contract. Their lawsuit seeks at least $10 million in damages owing to the tour's cancellation and the breakup of the band, and asks that Farrell pay outstanding costs related to the cancelled tour and the inability to record new songs for which the band is contractually obligated. Farrell subsequently filed his own lawsuit against Navarro, Perkins and Avery, accusing his bandmates of bullying, assault and battery, and for "harassing him onstage during performances" which allegedly included "playing their instruments at a high volume so that he could not hear himself sing without blasting his own in-ear monitors at an unsafe level." Farrell also seeks damages for libel, claiming that the other members inaccurately described him in the media as suffering from poor mental health and alcoholism.

On December 17, 2025, the members of Jane's Addiction confirmed in a joint statement that, despite having reconciled with Farrell, the band would not continue: "We have come together one last time to resolve our differences, so that the legacy of Jane's Addiction will remain the work the four of us created together. We now look forward to the future as we embark on our separate musical and creative endeavors. Jane's Addiction will forever live in our hearts. We are proud of the music we created together."

== Musical style and influences ==
Often associated with alternative rock, Jane's Addiction is credited for the mainstream exposure of the alternative music scene in the 1990s, and as pioneers of the first wave of alternative metal, combining heavy metal music with progressive rock. Critics have also described the band's sound as art punk, art rock, funk-punk, funk metal, hard rock, progressive punk and psychedelic rock. The band has also been considered a pioneer of nu metal.

According to Navarro, each of the band's members has (for the most part) unique influences: "We've never been on the same page in terms of our personal tastes, any one of us. We all have different record collections, with a few bands we land on at the same time - classic Pink Floyd, Led Zeppelin, and [Rolling] Stones. We all kind of come together in that one little genre, but apart from that everything we love and are influenced by as individuals is completely different." He also declared: "I always saw Jane's Addiction as the masculine Siouxsie and the Banshees. [...] There are so many similar threads: melody, use of sound, attitude, sex appeal." In an interview, the guitarist also stated: "Van Halen is definitely in my top five all-time favorite rock bands."

Talking about Ritual de lo Habitual, Alice Cooper remarked, "I can spot traces of other people on this album, us included, but that's all they are: traces. They were a really original band. This is their peak album, where they really went out on a limb. Sometimes I get so caught up in these songs, I can actually feel the band pushing themselves to their limits. Sometimes I can't believe how strong it is. I wonder if this will have the same effect on some kid as Chuck Berry had on me ..."

== Legacy and influence ==
Jane's Addiction is regarded as one of the most influential acts in alternative music. Tom Morello of Rage Against the Machine compared the band's influence to that of Nirvana. Artists influenced by Jane's Addiction include Tool, Korn, the Smashing Pumpkins, Limp Bizkit, Candlebox, P.O.D., Oceansize, Paul Banks of Interpol, Nothingface, Stabbing Westward, Incubus, System of a Down, and Strapping Young Lad.

"Nothing's Shocking influenced me a lot, especially with what Eric Avery proposed from the bass," said Nick Oliveri, of Queens of the Stone Age, Kyuss and Mondo Generator. "Eric had written the music on his own, the guitars and the drums came later. So he inspired me on that side, it is very possible that they were the first really alternative band." In a dissenting appraisal from 1993, the Sugar bassist David Barbe said Jane's Addiction was not "alternative" and described them as "corporate dick rock," and "Van Halen with different makeup artists."

== Side projects ==
The band members pursued other projects in the 1990s. Farrell and Perkins formed another band, Porno for Pyros, and had some success with their two albums, Porno for Pyros (1993) and Good God's Urge (1996); meanwhile, Avery and Navarro formed Deconstruction and put out a self-titled one-off album in 1994. Dave Navarro joined the Red Hot Chili Peppers in 1993 and in the same year Stephen Perkins started a band named Banyan, with core members Nels Cline, Mike Watt, and Willie Waldman (with revolving studio guests). Banyan has released three albums, their self titled-debut, Anytime At All and Live at Perkins' Palace.

During their second major split, the band were involved in a number of other projects. Navarro, Perkins, and Chaney formed a new band, The Panic Channel, with singer Steve Isaacs, who together released one album, titled One, in 2006. Perry Farrell, together with his wife Etty Lau Farrell and Extreme guitarist Nuno Bettencourt, formed Satellite Party. The band signed with Columbia Records and released their debut album, Ultra Payloaded in 2007. Eric Avery signed with Dangerbird Records for the release of his solo album Help Wanted in 2008.

== Band members ==
Image	Name	Years active	Instruments	Release contributions
	Perry Farrell	1985–1991; 1997; 2001–2004; 2008–2024	lead vocals; guitar; programming; keyboards; piano	all releases
	Eric Avery	1985–1991; 2008–2010; 2022–2024	bass; acoustic guitar	all releases from Jane's Addiction (1987) to Kettle Whistle (1997); Up from the Catacombs – The Best of Jane's Addiction (2006); A Cabinet of Curiosities (2009)
	Chris Brinkman	1985–1986	guitar	none
	Matt Chaikin	1985–1986	drums	none
	Stephen Perkins	1986–1991; 1997; 2001–2004; 2008–2024	drums; percussion; steel pan	all releases
	Dave Navarro	1986–1991; 1997; 2001–2004; 2008–2024 (not touring 2022–2024)	guitar; acoustic guitar; keyboards; piano	all releases
	Flea	1997 (session 1988)	bass; trumpet	Nothing's Shocking (1988); Kettle Whistle (1997)
	Martyn LeNoble	2001–2002	bass	none
	Chris Chaney	2002–2004; 2011–2022	bass	all releases from Strays (2003) to Alive At 25 (2017), except A Cabinet of Curiosities (2009)
	Duff McKagan	March-September 2010	bass	none

=== Touring musicians ===
Image	Name	Years active	Instruments	Release contributions
	Troy Van Leeuwen	2022	guitar	Van Leeuwen filled in for Navarro during the Spirits On Fire tour in 2022.
	Daniel Ash	2022	additional guitar	Ash and Klinghoffer joined the band for select moments during the band's 2022 Spirits On Fire tour. Klinghoffer then filled in for Navarro on the band's 2023 tour dates and co-wrote "True Love".
	Josh Klinghoffer	2022–2023	guitar (2023); additional guitar (2022)	Ash and Klinghoffer joined the band for select moments during the band's 2022 Spirits On Fire tour. Klinghoffer then filled in for Navarro on the band's 2023 tour dates and co-wrote "True Love".

== Discography ==
Studio albums

- Nothing's Shocking (1988)
- Ritual de lo Habitual (1990)
- Strays (2003)
- The Great Escape Artist (2011)

== Awards and nominations ==
=== Grammy Awards ===
Year	Nominated work	Award	Result
1989	Nothing's Shocking	Best Hard Rock/Metal Performance Vocal Or Instrumental	Nominated
1991	Ritual De Lo Habitual	Best Hard Rock Performance	Nominated
1992	"Been Caught Stealing"	Best Rock Performance By A Duo Or Group With Vocal	Nominated
1992	"Been Caught Stealing"	Best Rock Song	Nominated
2004	"Just Because"	Best Hard Rock Performance	Nominated

=== MTV Video Music Awards ===
Year	Nominated work	Award	Result
1991	"Been Caught Stealing"	Best Alternative Video	Won

=== Other awards ===
Award	Year	Category	Nominee(s)	Result	Ref.
BT Digital Music Awards	2004	Best Use of Mobile	Jane's Addiction Flashmob	Nominated	
Pollstar Concert Industry Awards	1988	Club Tour of the Year	Tour	Nominated	
Pollstar Concert Industry Awards	1991	Best New Rock Artist	Themselves	Nominated	
Pollstar Concert Industry Awards	1991	Small Hall Tour of the Year	Tour	Nominated	
Pollstar Concert Industry Awards	1992	Most Creative Stage Production	Tour	Nominated	
Pollstar Concert Industry Awards	1998	Small Hall Tour of the Year	Tour	Nominated	
Pollstar Concert Industry Awards	2004	Most Creative Tour Package	Tour	Nominated	
Pollstar Concert Industry Awards	2010	Most Creative Tour Package	Tour	Nominated	
Webby Awards	2012	Best Music Video	Jane's Addiction Comes Alive	Won	
Žebřík Music Awards	2003	Best International Surprise	Themselves	Nominated	

== Sources ==
- Arvizu, Reginald (March 10, 2009). Got the Life: My Journey of Addiction, Faith, Recovery, and Korn. William Morrow. ISBN 978-0-06-166249-2.
- DeRogatis, Jim (2003). Turn on Your Mind: Four Decades of Great Psychedelic Rock. Hal Leonard Corporation. ISBN 1617802158.
- Forman, Murray and Mark Anthony Neal (2004). That's the Joint!: The Hip-Hop Studies Reader. Routledge. ISBN 0415969190.
- Harrison, Thomas (2011). Music of the 1980s. ABC-CLIO. ISBN 978-0313366000.
- Knowles, Christopher (2010). The Secret History of Rock 'n' Roll. Cleis Press. ISBN 978-1573445641.
- Mullen, Brendan. Whores: An Oral Biography of Perry Farrell and Jane's Addiction. Cambridge: Da Capo, 2005. ISBN 0-306-81347-5
- Owings, Henry H. and Patton Oswalt (2006). The Overrated Book. Last Gasp. ISBN 0867196572.
- Taylor, Steve (2006). The A to X of Alternative Music. Continuum International Publishing Group. ISBN 0826482171.
- Udo, Tommy (2002). Brave Nu World. Sanctuary. ISBN 186074415X.
- Waksman, Steve (2009). This Ain't the Summer of Love: Conflict and Crossover in Heavy Metal and Punk. University of California Press. ISBN 978-0520943889.
