= Up from the Catacombs – The Best of Jane's Addiction =

Greatest hits album by Jane's Addiction
- Released: September 19, 2006
- Recorded: 1987–2003
- Genre: Alternative rock, alternative metal
- Length: 79:22
- Label: Rhino
- Producer: Various

Jane's Addiction chronology
Strays (2003)	Up from the Catacombs – The Best of Jane's Addiction (2006)	NINJA 2009 Tour Sampler (2009)

Professional ratings
Review scores
Source	Rating
Allmusic	4/5 stars
Pitchfork Media	(8.5/10)
The Rolling Stone Album Guide	2/5 stars

Up from the Catacombs – The Best of Jane's Addiction is a best of compilation album by Jane's Addiction, released September 19, 2006, on Rhino.

== Background ==
The album contains previously released material from each of Jane's Addiction's albums; from their eponymous live debut to Strays.

The title is taken from lyrics featured in the song "Chip Away", released on Jane's Addiction.

== Track listing ==
No.	Title	Original album	Length
1.	"Stop!"	Ritual de lo Habitual (1990)	4:15
2.	"Ocean Size"	Nothing's Shocking (1988)	4:21
3.	"Whores"	Jane's Addiction (1987)	4:08
4.	"Ted, Just Admit It..."	Nothing's Shocking	7:25
5.	"Ain't No Right"	Ritual de lo Habitual	2:46
6.	"Had a Dad"	Nothing's Shocking	3:48
7.	"Superhero"	Strays (2003)	3:59
8.	"Been Caught Stealing"	Ritual de lo Habitual	3:35
9.	"Just Because"	Strays	3:53
10.	"Three Days"	Ritual de lo Habitual	10:50
11.	"I Would For You"	Jane's Addiction	3:55
12.	"Classic Girl"	Ritual de lo Habitual	5:10
13.	"Summertime Rolls"	Nothing's Shocking	6:21
14.	"Mountain Song"	Nothing's Shocking	4:05
15.	"Pigs in Zen"	Nothing's Shocking	4:33
16.	"Jane Says" (Live)	Kettle Whistle (1997)	6:18
Total length:			79:22

== Personnel ==
=== Band Members ===
- Perry Farrell – vocals, harmonica
- Dave Navarro – guitars, keyboards, bass
- Stephen Perkins – drums, percussion
- Eric Avery – bass, acoustic guitar
- Chris Chaney – bass (tracks 7 & 9)

=== Compilation Production ===
- Jane's Addiction – compilation producer
- Mason Williams – compilation producer
- Steven Baker – executive producer
- Bill Inglot – sound producer, remastering
- Dan Hersch – remastering
- Digiprep – remastering
- Lisa Liese – product manager
- Steve Woolard – discographical annotation
- Corey Frye – editorial supervision
- Rachael Bickerton – business affairs
- Hugh Brown – art direction, photography (booklet insides)
- Mathieu Bitton – art direction, design
- Scott Webber – art supervision
- Roger Viollet – photography (digipack, booklet front & back cover)
- Alessandra Quaranta – photo research
- Karen LeBlanc – project assistance
- Robin Hurley – project assistance
- Kenny Nemes – project assistance
- Matt Abels – project assistance
- Julie Brunnick – project assistance
- Jamie Young – project assistance
- Jill Berliner – project assistance
- Michelle Jubelirer – project assistance
- Larrisa Friend – project assistance
- Eric Greenspan – project assistance
- Stephen Lowy – project assistance
