= Kingdom of Hungary (disambiguation) =

Kingdom of Hungary was a monarchy in Central Europe from 1000 to 1946.

Kingdom of Hungary may also refer to:

- Kingdom of Hungary (1000–1301)
- Kingdom of Hungary (1301–1526)
- Kingdom of Hungary (1526–1867)
  - Royal Hungary (1526–1699)
  - Eastern Hungarian Kingdom (1526–1570)
- Kingdom of Hungary (1867–1918)
- Kingdom of Hungary (1920–1946)
- Lands of the Hungarian Crown

== See also ==
- Hungary (disambiguation)
