= Hungry: A Mother and Daughter Fight Anorexia =

Book by Sheila and Lisa Himmel

- Author: Sheila Himmel and Lisa Himmel
- Language: English
- Publisher: Berkley Trade
- Publication date: August 4, 2009
- Publication place: United States
- Media type: Print (Paperback)
- Pages: 304 pp
- ISBN: 0-425-22790-1
- OCLC: 268795111

Hungry: A Mother and Daughter Fight Anorexia is a 2009 book cowritten by Sheila Himmel and Lisa Himmel. Written by a daughter and her mother, Hungry depicts Lisa Himmel's struggle with anorexia and bulimia. Published by Berkley Trade, Hungry took six years to be completed because of Lisa's relapses.

== Overview ==
=== Lisa Himmel ===
Lisa Himmel was born to Ned and Sheila Himmel in 1984. When she was in grade school, Lisa was jealous of her classmate's candy. She hid sweets in her desk and by the time she was in fourth grade, she was a little heavier than others in her grade.

Lisa's struggle with anorexia began during her junior year of high school. She started having problems with her friendships and her grades plummeted. Lisa exercised compulsively through hours of working out at the gym and soccer. Lisa became bulimic after starting college. While attending UC Santa Cruz, her bulimia became worse. She ascribes her progress in combatting her disorder to four people; a psychologist, a nutritionist, a high school teacher, and a student health director.

=== Sheila Himmel ===
Sheila Himmel was a restaurant reviewer from the San Jose Mercury News from 1996 to 2005. She had worked at the Mercury News for a total of 26 years. Raised in Lafayette, California, she now lives in Berkeley, California. She received the James Beard Award in 2003.
