= I'm Hungry =

I'm Hungry may refer to:

- "I'm Hungry" (Roseanne), a 1990 television episode
- I'm Hungry!, a children's book by Rod Campbell
- "I'm Hungry", a song by Alice Cooper from Along Came a Spider, 2008
- "I'm Hungry", a song by Cassidy from Split Personality, 2004
- "I'm Hungry", a song by the Frogs from My Daughter the Broad, 1996
- "I'm Hungry", a song by Kottonmouth Kings from Joint Venture, 2005
- "I'm Hungry", a song by The Sugarcubes from Stick Around For Joy, 1992

== See also ==
- J'ai faim !!! (lit. I'm hungry !!!), a 2001 French comedy film
