= A Cabinet of Curiosities =

Box set by Jane's Addiction
- Released: April 21, 2009
- Recorded: 1986–1991
- Genre: Alternative rock
- Language: English
- Label: Rhino
- Producer: Various

Jane's Addiction chronology
NINJA 2009 Tour Sampler (2009)	A Cabinet of Curiosities (2009)	The Great Escape Artist (2011)

Professional ratings
Review scores
Source	Rating
Allmusic	3.5/5 stars
The A.V. Club	B−
IGN	(9/10)
Paste	(6.9/10)
Pitchfork Media	(6.0/10)
Rolling Stone	2.5/5 stars

A Cabinet of Curiosities is a compilation box set by alternative rock band Jane's Addiction, released on April 21, 2009, on Rhino Records.

== Background ==
The collection includes three discs of demos, rehearsals, remixes, covers, and live recordings from the group's initial lifespan of 1986–1991, and one DVD featuring the movie Soul Kiss, the band's music videos, and concert footage. Vocalist Perry Farrell stated that "it's a really nice, fetishy object."

In 2009, vocalist Perry Farrell stated that "[the] box set was supposed to be released two years ago. It just took so long. We cut that deal on the box set when we were still together on the last record, and it took that long to get it co-ordinated and gathered and all those other things and it was just kind of a happenstance that we were together at this time. When Rhino saw that we were together they thought, 'Let's just really work day and night and get the thing out.'"

== Track listing ==
=== Disc 1 ===
All tracks are written by Perry Farrell, Dave Navarro, Eric Avery, and Stephen Perkins, except where noted.

No.	Title	Length
1.	"Jane Says" (Radio Tokyo Demo)	4:05
2.	"Pigs in Zen" (Radio Tokyo Demo)	3:59
3.	"Mountain Song" (Radio Tokyo Demo)	4:06
4.	"Had a Dad" (Radio Tokyo Demo)	3:53
5.	"I Would for You" (Radio Tokyo Demo)	3:29
6.	"Idiots Rule" (Demo)	3:02
7.	"Classic Girl" (Demo)	5:04
8.	"Up the Beach" (Demo)	2:52
9.	"Suffer Some" (Demo)	5:05
10.	"Thank You Boys" (Demo)	1:19
11.	"Summertime Rolls" (Demo)	5:56
12.	"City" (Demo)	2:34
13.	"Ocean Size" (Demo)	4:32
14.	"Stop!" (Demo)	3:58
15.	"Standing in the Shower... Thinking" (Demo)	3:03
16.	"Ain't No Right" (Demo)	2:55
17.	"Three Days" (Demo)	9:05

=== Disc 2 ===
No.	Title	Writer(s)	Length
1.	"Ted, Just Admit It..." (Demo)		6:57
2.	"Maceo" (Demo)		4:25
3.	"No One's Leaving" (Demo)		3:29
4.	"My Time" (Rehearsal)		3:30
5.	"Been Caught Stealing" (12" Remix Version)		4:24
6.	"Ripple" (Grateful Dead cover)	Jerry Garcia, Robert Hunter	4:39
7.	"Don't Call Me Nigger, Whitey" (feat. Ice-T and Ernie C; Sly and the Family Stone cover)	Sylvester Stewart	4:19
8.	"L.A. Medley" (Live)	Various (see below)	3:44
9.	"Kettle Whistle" (Live)		6:23
10.	"Whole Lotta Love" (Live; Led Zeppelin cover)	Jimmy Page, John Bonham, John Paul Jones, Robert Plant, Willie Dixon	4:08
11.	"1970" (Live; the Stooges cover)	Iggy Pop, Ron Asheton, Dave Alexander, Scott Asheton	2:39
12.	"Bobhaus" (Live)	Bob Dylan, Peter Murphy, David Haskins, Kevin Haskins	2:22

- "L.A Medley" is a medley consisting of:
  - "L.A. Woman" (originally by the Doors; written by Jim Morrison, Ray Manzarek, Robby Krieger, and John Densmore)
  - "Nausea" (originally by X; written by John Duchac and Christene Cervenková)
  - "Lexicon Devil" (originally by Germs; written by Jan Paul Beahm and Georg Ruthenberg)

=== Disc 3 ===
Live at the Palladium 12/19/90
No.	Title	Length
1.	"Drum Intro" (Live)	3:56
2.	"Up the Beach" (Live)	3:05
3.	"Whores" (Live)	3:50
4.	"1%" (Live)	3:28
5.	"No One's Leaving" (Live)	3:17
6.	"Ain't No Right" (Live)	3:39
7.	"Then She Did..." (Live)	10:01
8.	"Had a Dad" (Live)	5:24
9.	"Been Caught Stealing" (Live)	5:49
10.	"Three Days" (Live)	12:11
11.	"Mountain Song" (Live)	4:05
12.	"Stop!" (Live)	4:45
13.	"Summertime Rolls" (Live)	8:15
14.	"Ocean Size" (Live)	4:39

== DVD ==
- Soul Kiss
- "Mountain Song" (Unedited Version)
- "City"

=== Music videos ===
- "Had a Dad"
- "Ocean Size"
- "Stop!"
- "Been Caught Stealing"
- "Classic Girl"
- "Ain't No Right"

=== Live at the City Square in Milan (for MTV Italy, October 1990) ===
- "Whores"
- "Then She Did..."
- "Three Days"

=== Bonus disc 5 ===
Live at Irvine Meadows, 7/23-24/91 (Available as a Best Buy exclusive for a limited supply)

1. "Standing in the Shower...Thinking"
2. "Of Course"
3. "Ted, Just Admit It..."
4. "Mountain Song"
5. "Stop!"
