= Greater Hungary =

Greater Hungary may refer to:

- Kingdom of Hungary before 1920, informally also known as "Greater Hungary"
- Greater Hungary or Hungarian irredentism, the full or partial territorial restoration of the Kingdom of Hungary
- Magna Hungaria, the ancestral homeland of the Hungarians located near the Ural Mountains, referred to by John of Plano Carpini as "Greater Hungary"
