= Hungry Range =

Mountain in Nevada, United States

- Location within Nevada

Highest point
- Elevation: 5,978 ft (1,822 m)

Geography
- Country: United States
- State: Nevada
- District: Washoe County
- Range coordinates: 39°47′43.671″N 119°45′55.687″W
- Topo map: USGS Bedell Flat

The Hungry Range, or Hungry Mountain, is a low, elongated mountain in Washoe County, Nevada, United States. The mountain separates Hungry Valley on the east from Antelope Valley on the west.
