= End to the Lies =

Single by Jane's Addiction

from the album The Great Escape Artist
- Released: March 30, 2011
- Genre: Alternative rock
- Length: 3:35
- Label: Capitol
- Songwriters: Perry Farrell, Dave Navarro, Stephen Perkins, Dave Sitek
- Producer: Rich Costey

Jane's Addiction singles chronology
"True Nature" (2003)	"End to the Lies" (2011)	"Irresistible Force" (2011)

"End to the Lies" is the first single by American alternative rock band Jane's Addiction from its fourth album The Great Escape Artist. It was released on March 30, 2011, via digital download, the band's first new release after 2003's Strays.

== Background ==
The song features TV on the Radio member Dave Sitek on bass, in place of the previous bassists Eric Avery and Duff McKagan. Master Musicians of Joujouka also contribute to the track on rhaita and additional percussion.

The song was compared to the works and the style of the TV on the Radio. The song progresses from Dave Sitek's funk-inspired grooves. It is noted for its "hypnotic tribal rhythm", which was attributed to Master Musicians of Joujouka's involvement, and Dave Navarro's "fuzzed-out" guitar work on the verse riff, which gave an impression of "pulsating."

== Music video ==
The music video for the song features animated figures of Perry Farrell, Dave Navarro, and Stephen Perkins performing alongside and painted on a female nude model. A Todd Newman-directed video, which depicts the band members and Dave Sitek during the recording session of the song, was also released on April 8, 2011.

== Track listing ==
No.	Title	Length
1.	"End to the Lies"	3:35
