= Irresistible Force (Met the Immovable Object) =

Single by Jane's Addiction

from the album The Great Escape Artist
- Released: August 3, 2011
- Length: 3:59
- Label: Capitol
- Songwriters: Perry Farrell, Dave Navarro, Stephen Perkins, Dave Sitek
- Producer: Rich Costey

Jane's Addiction singles chronology
"End to the Lies" (2011)	"Irresistible Force" (2011)	"Underground" (2011)

"Irresistible Force" is the second single from American alternative rock band Jane's Addiction's fourth studio album, The Great Escape Artist. The song was released on August 3, 2011.

== Musical style and lyrics ==
The song features TV on the Radio member and multi-instrumentalist Dave Sitek on guitar and bass guitar. It is less rock-laden than the previous Jane's Addiction single, "End to the Lies", and focuses more on synth-aided textures and atmospheric soundscapes. The song starts with a spoken word intro and continues on verse-chorus form, which is accompanied by a guitar solo by Dave Navarro. The verses, which were built around "droning funk" and "the rubbery basslines" were also noted.

Lyrically, the song contains references to the irresistible force paradox. In an interview with CNN, the lyricist Perry Farrell indicated that "the song chronicles how the universe was created", while the drummer Stephen Perkins described it as "what pulls him, Dave and Perry together". Will Hermes of Rolling Stone also commented on the song's lyrics, describing it as "Perry Farrell sounding like Carl Sagan in an episode of Cosmos, musing ominously about the stars and some sort of big bang."

== Reception and release ==
The critical reception for the song was positive.

A music video for the song was produced.

== Track listing ==
No.	Title	Length
1.	"Irresistible Force"	3:59

== Charts ==
Chart (2011)	Peak position
Canada Rock (Billboard)	15
US Alternative Airplay (Billboard)	9
US Hot Rock & Alternative Songs (Billboard)	16
