= Trust No One (Dave Navarro album) =

Studio album by Dave Navarro
- Released: June 19, 2001
- Studios: Mad Hatter, Sunset Sound Recorders, NRG (Los Angeles); Media Vortex (Burbank, California); Southern Tracks (Atlanta, Georgia)
- Genres: Alternative rock, electronic rock
- Length: 45:00
- Label: Capitol
- Producers: Rich Costey; Dave Navarro; Andrew Slater (also exec.)

Dave Navarro chronology
Rhimorse (1995)	Trust No One (2001)

Singles from Trust No One
- 1. "Rexall" Released: May 18, 2001; 2. "Hungry" Released: September 3, 2001

Professional ratings
Review scores
Source	Rating
AllMusic	3/5 stars
Kerrang!	4/5 stars
Melodic	3.5/5 stars
Rolling Stone	3/5 stars

Trust No One is the debut studio album by guitarist Dave Navarro. It was released on June 19, 2001, on Capitol.

In 2009, Navarro stated: "I did a solo record [Trust No One] where I did everything and toured, and as great as an experience as that was, it’s not what I want to do full time. It’s a mind fuck. I don’t dig it. It’s something I do once in a while and I certainly intend to do it again, but I’m much better suited to be part of an ensemble."

== Background and release ==
Navarro recorded an album in 1998 under the name "Spread", playing the majority of instruments. After learning the name was in use by a band and a failed attempt to buy the name, he opted to release it under his own.

The style and theme of the album are very dark, revolving around events taking place in Navarro's life at the time. The album's title may also have originated with the murder of his mother when Navarro was a teenager. "I shut my eyes to how precious life is," he said, "and instead I grew to believe that nobody could be trusted."

Drummer Matt Chamberlain plays on all songs bar "Very Little Daylight" and parts of "Sunny Day", with drums by Roy Mayorga of Stone Sour, and "Not for Nothing", with drums by Navarro's Jane's Addiction bandmate Stephen Perkins.

"Everything" contains a sample of "The Sporting Life" by Diamanda Galás and John Paul Jones, from the album of the same name.

The opening track "Rexall" was the first single, released on May 18, 2001. It was complemented by a music video directed by Honey. It was named after a drugstore in Los Angeles where his parents met. The album's second single, "Hungry", was released on September 3, 2001. Its music video starred Carmen Electra and was directed by Chris Robinson.

Dave Navarro publicly stated on an Instagram post in April 2026 that Chad Smith of the Red Hot Chili Peppers co-wrote "most of the songs." He went on to say, "When it was released, I made a mistake—I failed to include Chad as a co-writer on much of the material. When he called me about it, I was embarrassed, ashamed, and had no answer that could make it right." Navarro included an apology to Smith, saying "Chad, if you see this, I’m truly sorry I didn’t give you the credit you deserved. I hope we cross paths again so I can thank you properly—for the inspiration and for being such an important part of that time in my life."

== Track listing ==
All tracks are written by Dave Navarro, except where noted.

No.	Title	Writer(s)	Length
1.	"Rexall"		3:58
2.	"Hungry"		3:33
3.	"Sunny Day"		4:46
4.	"Mourning Son"		4:03
5.	"Everything"		4:31
6.	"Not for Nothing"		5:28
7.	"Avoiding the Angel"		4:26
8.	"Very Little Daylight"		4:11
9.	"Venus in Furs" (The Velvet Underground cover)	Lou Reed	4:29
10.	"Slow Motion Sickness"		5:31
Total length:			45:00

=== B-sides ===
1. "Easy Girl" – 5:09
2. "Somebody Else" – 3:35
3. "The Bed" (Lou Reed) – 4:26

== Personnel ==
Adapted from the album liner notes.

Musicians

- Dave Navarro – lead vocals, guitars, bass, synthesizer, keyboards, sampling
- Matt Chamberlain – drums on "Rexall", "Hungry", "Sunny Day" (verses and chorus), "Mourning Son", "Everything", "Not for Nothing", "Avoiding the Angel", "Very Little Daylight" and "Slow Motion Sickness"
- Rich Costey – programming, production, additional guitar on "Rexall" and "Hungry", synth programming on "Sunny Day", chorus guitar on "Everything", vibraphone on "Very Little Daylight"
- Mike Elizondo – bass on "Rexall"
- Roy Mayorga – drums on "Sunny Day" (bridge and outro) and "Very Little Daylight", percussion on "Venus In Furs" and "Sunny Day"
- Holly Palmer – vocals on "Hungry"
- DJ Nu-Mark – additional production and drum programming on "Sunny Day"
- Jon Brion – intro voice and slide bass on "Mourning Son", additional guitar and ring modulator guitar on "Very Little Daylight"
- Pinky Villandry – backing vocals on "Mourning Son"
- Ben Hall-Roberts – strings on "Everything"
- Twiggy Ramirez – bass on "Everything"
- Stephen Perkins – drums on "Not for Nothing"
- Monet Mazur – background scream on "Not for Nothing"
- Danny Saber – additional production, programming, bass on "Venus in Furs"
- Brendan O'Brien – bass and keyboards on "Slow Motion Sickness"

Production

- Andrew Slater – co-production (on "Rexall"), executive producer
- Brendan O'Brien – mixer on "Hungry", "Mourning Son", "Everything", "Not for Nothing", "Avoiding the Angel", "Slow Motion Sickness"
- Rich Costey – mixer on "Rexall", "Sunny Day", "Very Little Daylight", "Venus in Furs"
- Dale Lawton – assistant engineer (Mad Hatter)
- Geoff Walcha – assistant engineer (Sunset Sound)
- Ryan Williams – assistant engineer (Southern Tracks)
- Dave Ahlert – assistant engineer (Media Vortex)
- Steve Mixdorf – assistant engineer (NRG)
- Mark Plati – additional engineering
- Dave Schiffman – additional engineering
- Danny Saber – additional engineering
- Jimmy Boyle – additional engineering
- Eddy Schreyer – mastering (at Oasis Mastering)
- Gene Grimaldi – mastering (at Oasis Mastering)
