= Just Because (Jane's Addiction song) =

Single by Jane's Addiction

from the album Strays
- Released: 2003
- Recorded: 2002–2003
- Studio: Henson Recording Studios (Los Angeles, California)
- Genre: Hard rock
- Length: 3:51
- Label: Capitol
- Songwriters: Perry Farrell; Dave Navarro; Stephen Perkins; Bob Ezrin; Chris Chaney
- Producers: Bob Ezrin; Brian Virtue

Jane's Addiction singles chronology
"So What!" (1999)	"Just Because" (2003)	"True Nature" (2003)

"Just Because" was the first single from alternative rock band Jane's Addiction's third album, Strays in 2003.

== Background ==
"It's not hard to see why 'Just Because' has been chosen as the first single," noted Classic Rock. "It has a punishing yet radio-friendly groove, plus enough gloss and polish to sit among the flotsam on MTV2. Yet unlike many of the youngsters jostling to get their spiked hairdos on the box, Jane's have taken the trouble to add a song and go easy on the quasi-adolescent self-pity."

The song was one of the most successful in the band's history. Their third number one on the Modern Rock Tracks chart, it also charted at number 72 on the Billboard Hot 100 – their only appearance on that chart to date. It was also their first top-ten entry on the Mainstream Rock Tracks chart, reaching number four. It hit number 14 on the UK Singles Chart, making it the band's highest charting British single.

== Music video ==
The video features the band playing in a dome with lights flashing around the walls and ceilings.

== Track listing ==
1. "Just Because" – 3:53
2. "Suffer Some" (live) – 4:24
3. "Price I Pay" (live) – 5:50

== Charts ==
Chart (2003)	Peak position
Australia (ARIA)	129
Canada (Nielsen SoundScan)	22
Netherlands (Single Top 100)	93
Scottish Singles Sales (Official Charts)	12
UK Singles (Official Charts)	14
UK Rock & Metal (Official Charts)	2
US Billboard Hot 100	72
US Alternative Airplay (Billboard)	1
US Mainstream Rock (Billboard)	4
