= Orange Sky =

Orange sky may refer to the following:

- "Orange Sky" (song), from Alexi Murdoch's EP Four Songs
- The Orange Sky, a Ukrainian film was made in 2006 after the Orange Revolution
- "Orange Skies", a song written by Bryan MacLean and originally recorded in 1966 by the band Love for their second album Da Capo (1967)
- Orange Sky Laundry a charity based in Brisbane, Australia that offers a free mobile laundry service for the homeless
- Phenomenon of orange sky, caused by Saharan dust, seen across the United Kingdom on 16 October 2017 as a result of Hurricane Ophelia
