= Steve Isaacs =

American actor, creative director and musician (born 1969)

- Born: Steven Wendell Isaacs; June 19, 1969 (age 57); United States
- Genres: Alternative rock
- Occupations: Musician; songwriter; actor; VJ; creative director
- Instruments: Vocals; guitar
- Years active: 1983–present
- Labels: MCA, Capitol
- Formerly of: Skycycle; The Panic Channel
- Website: steveisaacs.com

Steven Wendell Isaacs (born June 19, 1969) is an American actor, creative director and musician, perhaps best known as the lead vocalist for the bands The Panic Channel, featuring former members of Jane's Addiction, and Skycycle, as well as being a VJ for MTV from 1991 to 1993.

== Biography ==
Isaacs first television appearance was as a contestant on the TV game show Starcade in 1983 when he was 14 years old.

In 1989, Isaacs attended Musicians Institute in Hollywood, California, where he studied guitar. After, he co-owned the Mad Hatter's Espresso Bar in Los Angeles, where he performed and hosted a weekly open mike show that featured singer/songwriters, comedians and performance artists. In late 1990, he left the Mad Hatter's Espresso Bar to host the open mike at Highland Grounds Café in Hollywood.

While hosting at Highland Grounds, he was discovered by an MTV talent scout. He became an MTV VJ in September 1991, which required relocating from Los Angeles to New York City. While at MTV, he hosted daily segments and shows, including "The Top 20 Countdown", "MTV's Daily Most Wanted", and a daily live show "Hangin with MTV." Isaacs left MTV in April 1993.

After auditioning for the Broadway Touring Company of The Who's Tommy the rock opera's composer, Pete Townshend selected him to perform the lead role. Isaacs toured with the show from 1993 to January 1995, performing over 500 shows in 32 cities in the U.S., including a show for President Bill Clinton at the Kennedy Center, and receiving a 1995 Helen Hayes Awards Outstanding Lead Actor nomination for his performance at that Washington DC venue.

Isaacs relocated in 1995 to Los Angeles to focus on music. In the fall of 1995, he formed the band Skycycle, which consisted of bassist Kelly Castro, guitarist Sven Shenar, and drummer Rob Brown. Named for the rocket-powered vehicle with which Evel Knievel famously attempted to jump the Snake River Canyon. On October 31, 1997 Skycycle was offered a recording contract by MCA Records. The band released an EP, "Breathing Water" produced by Failure's Ken Andrews, and recorded the album "Ones and Zeros" but was dropped from the label just before the scheduled release. Their song "Terror Time" was featured in the animated movie Scooby Doo on Zombie Island. While in Skycycle, Isaacs acted as band art director and webmaster. Skycycle broke up in the Summer of 2000. Thirteen years after the scheduled release of Ones and Zeros the band's catalog transferred to Geffen Records, and was digitally released on iTunes and Spotify.

Isaacs then worked as a web designer and Flash animator, producing film and television websites. While working as a designer, he often played solo material at various clubs in L.A. It was at one of these acoustic shows that a common friend of his and Dave Navarro's attended. She brought Isaacs' music to Navarro, Stephen Perkins and Chris Chaney's attention, the three having recently broken up with alternative rock pioneers Jane's Addiction. The foursome's early writing sessions took place in Stephen Perkins' garage and ultimately gave birth to a new band, The Panic Channel. The band signed to Capitol Records in 2005 and released their debut album One on August 15, 2006. After the band's 2007 tour in support of (ONe), Isaacs moved back to New York City.

From 2007–2010, Isaacs acted as Creative Director at Deep Focus NYC, an interactive marketing and advertising agency specializing in social media. His 2009 campaign for HBO's Flight of the Conchords won two Webby Awards and creative directed the Mad Men viral microsite, Mad Men Yourself. Isaacs then moved back to Los Angeles to work at entertainment marketing agency BLT Communications where his projects included the digital advertising campaigns for Disney/Pixar's Brave and Disney's The Muppets.

In June 2013, Isaacs launched the web series Sweet Ride USA, acting as host, executive producer and creative director. In the show, Isaacs hosts exploratory bicycle rides searching for desserts on routes designed to burn off all the calories consumed. The show was featured in an 8-page story in the March 2014 issue of Bicycling Magazine.

He is now the EVP of Creative at Legion Creative. He is also an illustrator for Cinephile: A Card Game and A is for Auteur, a kid’s picture book about the world’s best directors.

He lives in Los Angeles with his wife April and daughter Hanalei.

== Discography ==
with Skycycle

- Breathing Water (EP; 1998)
- Ones and Zeros (1999)

with The Panic Channel

- One (2006)
