= Mason Brothers =

American folk rock band

- Origin: Richmond, Virginia,
- Genres: Folk rock, indie folk
- Years active: 2008-present
- Members: James Mason; Christian Mason
- Website: www.masonbrothersmusic.com

Mason Brothers is a folk rock band from Richmond, Virginia, formed in 2008.

The band consists of James Mason (lead vocals, guitar), and Christian Mason (guitar). They combine elaborate finger-picked guitars, splashes of lap steel, percussion, and piano with soft, yet hopeful lyrics. Some of their long-time influences include Nick Drake, Pink Floyd, Neil Young, Bob Dylan, and Leonard Cohen.

== History ==
=== Beginnings ===
The story of Mason Brothers began with the solo work of James Mason. In 2003, James wrote and recorded a solo album entitled Carnival Sky under the label Sonoface Records. Several tracks on this record feature James' brother, Christian Mason. On these collaborative tracks, both brothers were surprised to find that they had penned a unique and striking sound. With two finger-picked acoustic guitars playing in unison, the brothers created an arresting, acoustic wall of sound. The record drew praise from places as far away as Luxembourg and Greece for its stripped-down acoustic ballads, redolent of L.A. troubadour Elliott Smith.

The brothers went on to play several shows in Virginia, DC, and North Carolina, opening up for acts such as Magnolia Electric Company and Mates of State. Even without extensive touring the record made an impact, charting on CMJ reporting radio stations. Everyone involved was pleasantly surprised with the level and nature of the attention created with minimal, grassroots publicity.

=== The Sun, the Moon & the Sea (2008) ===
Upon its release, their debut album, The Sun, the Moon & the Sea met with critical acclaim, described by Popmatters, for example, as "one of the best folk/acoustic records to come along in some time." The record charted 114th on the ReverbNation local charts for Richmond, Virginia rock bands. Although the album did not chart, it was reviewed by Billboard.

Various blogs began featuring MP3s from the record, and providing enthusiastic and thoughtful reviews: "… cinematic folk music, rich and deliberately crafted, with guitars and voices woven tightly together. It's something a visionary movie director would do well to notice … a tremendous debut" (Catfish Vegas). One movie director did take notice as the brothers' song "Ghost at the Wheel" was featured in the unreleased feature film Don't Fade Away, alongside artists such as Ryan Adams and Alexi Murdoch on the film soundtrack. Christian Mason also did some custom scoring for the film. Other songs from The Sun, the Moon & the Sea were also featured on a variety of television shows and documentaries, on networks including the CW (90210), CBS (Flashpoint), History Channel, Biography Channel, PBS documentaries; as well as various surfing broadcasts, films, and documentaries.

=== Ghost Season (2011) ===
The brothers released their follow-up, Ghost Season, in 2011 to critical acclaim, this time charting with the title 'New & Noteworthy' on iTunes. It featured full-band orchestrations, and a variety of dynamic styles, in contrast to the understated folk style of The Sun, the Moon & the Sea.

=== Ivy in the Orange Grove (2012) ===
"Game of Cards", a single from the album, was released July 31, 2012, to "New & Noteworthy" status, charting in the "Singer/Songwriter" category on iTunes. A music video for the single, shot and directed by Chris Aguilar of Soul Surf Media Productions, was released on August 24.

== Members ==
- James Mason (lead vocals, guitar)
- Christian Mason (guitar, lap steel, backing vocals)

== Discography ==
=== Studio albums ===
- The Sun, the Moon & the Sea (2008)
- Ghost Season (2011)
- Ivy in the Orange Grove (2012)

=== Singles ===
- "Coming Home to You" (October 16, 2010)
- "Game of Cards" (July 31, 2012)
- "Falling Together" (January, 2015)
