= Skycycle (rock band) =

Alternative rock band from Los Angeles

- Origin: Los Angeles, California, United States
- Genres: Alternative rock, industrial rock
- Years active: 1995–2000, 2002
- Label: MCA
- Past members: Steve Isaacs; Sven Shenar; Kelly Castro; Chris Cano; Rob Brown (deceased)

Skycycle was a Los Angeles–based alternative rock band, led by former MTV VJ and singer-songwriter Steve Isaacs. The band is perhaps best known for their contributions to the 1998 Scooby-Doo on Zombie Island soundtrack.

== Band history ==
=== Formation ===
While touring as the main character in The Who's Tommy for sixteen months, Isaacs was planning to form a band after he finished touring in January 1995. He came up with the band name Skycycle while reading an article in Entertainment Weekly about the two-wheeled rocket in which Evel Knievel attempted to jump the Snake River Canyon in 1974. Isaacs initially started out playing with drummer Rob Brown, playing their first show on October 31, 1995. Two years later, he was recommended bassist Kelly Castro formerly of Caterwaul by a friend, and met guitarist Sven Shenar at work.

Skycycle released a self-produced demo tape named Siren with seven songs in 1997, and after playing a show in the L.A.-based club The Dragonfly on Halloween night that year, MCA Records A&R executive Tom Sarig offered them a record deal, leading up to the issuing of their six-song debut EP Breathing Water in January 1998. The band insisted on Ken Andrews to produce, record and mix the album, because they deemed him "the perfect guy to put in just that special touch". In the same year, Skycycle's management arranged for the band to contribute to the Scooby-Doo on Zombie Island soundtrack, for which they performed and produced the songs "The Ghost Is Here" and "It's Terror Time Again". Both songs were written by Tom Snow (music) and Glenn Leopold (lyrics).

=== Ones and Zeros and the Napster trial ===
Skycycle continued to record a full-length album named Ones and Zeros in 1998, which was produced by Rich Mouser and mixed by Neal Avron. It contained several songs Isaacs wrote touring in the rock opera Tommy as part of his "pop opera" Strawberry, and three rerecorded songs that previously appeared on Siren and Breathing Water. According to Isaacs, "The title and overall concept of Ones and Zeros refers to the future of society via the information superhighway and the way that we're able to take the wealth of the world's knowledge – history, science, entertainment, art and commerce – and reduce everything down to ones and zeros." After finishing recording the twelve tracks in January 1999, the band was pressured by MCA to reformat the album and to rerecord certain tracks before the album would be released, which the band considered "substantial and unwanted input from the recording label". The changes were ready by July 1999 and the album was initially scheduled for release on August 21, 1999, while the song "Last Girl on Earth" was released as a single and received substantial radio airplay.

MCA postponed the release of Ones and Zeros for several reasons, including "that the Christmas season was a better season for established artists". Skycycle's belief "that the quickly increasing popularity of the Internet could make MP3 a viable and effective promotional tool", combined with the growing impatience of the fans due to the many delays, led to the band releasing several songs as free MP3s on their website, which was still rarely done at the time. Although the release and distribution of MP3s were not covered in their contract, Isaacs was told "that the presence of MP3s on our site was 'upsetting' MCA executives [and] that this order came from the highest regions of the corporate structure at MCA and Universal, which believed that any support for the MP3 format was unacceptable." Although they took down the MP3s, Skycycle were dropped from MCA on January 26, 2000 and Ones and Zeros was never officially released on CD; some copies of the pressed CD have been issued by the label as a promotional copy, with the barcode being punched through. Circa 2020, the label has added the album to various music streaming platforms.

On July 26, 2000, Isaacs testified in the A&M/Leiber vs. Napster lawsuit, using the case of Skycycle as an example of "what we, and hundreds of other bands, have been through with the antiquated business model of the major label", and showing that it is possible to generate interest for a band by allowing people to listen to their music through media such as Napster. Isaacs illustrated their struggles with how the record label's advance payments for recording costs were recoupable by contract, meaning that the record company would recoup its investment before the band would receive money. As Skycycle were dismissed but never fully released from their contracts, MCA could demand payment of its recoupable expenses even if Skycycle were signed to another label. Due to their contract's restrictions, the band considered self-publishing the album, but ultimately decided to give away Ones and Zeros in full as free download from their website, showing their early support of free trading of music as a promotional activity. Skycycle additionally became part of Napster's new artists’ program in early May 2000.

=== Later years ===
Drummer Rob Brown left the band to pursue a career in jazz music, but later died by suicide on 15 October 2010. Chris Cano replaced him on drums in March 2000. Skycycle continued to play and write music for about a year, and among others recorded an alternate version of the song "Antebellum", which was included on the 2000 compilation album Happy Meals Vol. 2: The Perfect Marriage. They disbanded in September 2000, and held one final reunion show on October 22, 2002 at The Dragonfly in Hollywood with The Penfifteen Club.

In 2004, Steve Isaacs formed the supergroup The Panic Channel together with several Jane's Addiction members. They released the album (ONe) in 2006, after which they went on an indefinite hiatus.

== Discography ==
- Siren (demo; 1997)
- Breathing Water (EP; 1998)
- Ones and Zeros (1999)
