= Get the Money =

Studio album by Taylor Hawkins and the Coattail Riders
- Released: November 8, 2019
- Genres: Alternative rock, hard rock
- Length: 40:18
- Labels: The Coat Tail Riders, Inc.; RCA
- Producers: John Lousteau; Taylor Hawkins

Taylor Hawkins and the Coattail Riders chronology
Red Light Fever (2010)	Get the Money (2019)

Get the Money is the third and final studio album by American rock band Taylor Hawkins and the Coattail Riders. It was released on November 8, 2019. It features 10 songs, including "I Really Blew It" and "Middle Child", for which music videos were recorded.

The album features guest contributions from Dave Grohl, Duff McKagan, Mark King, Joe Walsh, Roger Taylor, Nancy Wilson, Jon Davison, Perry Farrell, Chrissie Hynde, LeAnn Rimes, and Pat Smear. It was the last release by the band prior to the death of vocalist and drummer Taylor Hawkins on March 25, 2022.

== Track listing ==
All tracks are written by Taylor Hawkins, except "Shapes of Things" written by Paul Samwell-Smith, Jim McCarty and Keith Relf.

No.	Title	Length
1.	"Crossed the Line"	4:24
2.	"Don't Look at Me That Way"	4:06
3.	"You're No Good at Life No More"	4:08
4.	"I Really Blew It"	2:41
5.	"Queen of the Clowns"	4:19
6.	"Get the Money"	4:46
7.	"C U in Hell"	4:31
8.	"Middle Child"	3:46
9.	"Kiss the Ring"	4:09
10.	"Shapes of Things" (Yardbirds cover)	3:28
Total length:		40:18

== Personnel ==
Personnel taken from Get The Money liner notes.

Taylor Hawkins and the Coattail Riders

- Taylor Hawkins – drums, vocals; keyboards (1, 3), guitar (2, 5, 7, 9), piano (2, 10), percussion (4, 8), acoustic guitar (6)
- Brent Woods – guitar (1, 2, 4, 5, 7–9), backing vocals (4, 7–9), keyboards (7, 9)
- Chris Chaney – bass (1, 3–5, 7–10), keyboards (1, 3–5, 7)

Additional performers

- Dave Grohl – guitar (1, 3, 4, 8), vocals (1, 3), screams (4)
- John Lousteau – percussion (1–3, 5–7, 9, 10), backing vocals (5)
- Jon Davison – backing vocals (1)
- Duff McKagan – bass (2, 6)
- Nancy Wilson – vocals (2)
- Perry Farrell – vocals (4)
- Mark King – bass, vocals (5)
- Sylvia Massey – backing vocals (5)
- Joe Walsh – guitar (6)
- Chrissie Hynde – vocals (6)
- LeAnn Rimes – vocals (7)
- Oliver Ruman – slide guitar (7)
- Roger Taylor – vocals (10)
- Gannin Arnold – guitar (10)
- Pat Smear – guitar (10)
- Steve Jones – guitar (10)
