= Away We Go =

- Theatrical release poster
- Directed by: Sam Mendes
- Written by: Dave Eggers; Vendela Vida
- Produced by: Edward Saxon; Marc Turtletaub
- Starring: John Krasinski; Maya Rudolph; Jeff Daniels; Maggie Gyllenhaal; Allison Janney; Chris Messina; Catherine O'Hara; Paul Schneider
- Cinematography: Ellen Kuras
- Edited by: Sarah Flack
- Music by: Alexi Murdoch (Songs)
- Production companies: Big Beach; Neal Street Productions
- Distributed by: Focus Features
- Release date: June 25, 2009
- Running time: 98 minutes
- Country: United States
- Language: English
- Budget: $17 million
- Box office: $14.9 million

Away We Go is a 2009 American romantic comedy drama film directed by Sam Mendes and written by Dave Eggers and Vendela Vida. The film's two leads are John Krasinski and Maya Rudolph. It is Mendes's first film without Thomas Newman's collaboration.

== Plot ==
Verona De Tessant and Burt Farlander are in their early 30s in the Denver area and struggling to meet daily needs and build fulfilling lives. Learning they will soon become parents, they are confronted with the challenge of how – and where – to raise a child and build a happy family.

Six months into Verona's pregnancy, they visit their only family in the area, Burt's parents, Gloria and Jerry, only to find they are moving to Antwerp, Belgium, a month before the baby is due. They will be gone for two years and they have already rented their place to another couple, despite Burt's and Verona's situation.

Frustrated with his parents' selfishness and careless attitude, Burt and Verona decide this is an opportunity to find somewhere else to raise their family, as they both can work from home and live wherever they choose.

They first visit Phoenix, Arizona, to see Verona's old boss Lily, her husband Lowell, and their two children. Burt in particular is disturbed by the couple's crass and mean-spirited behavior toward one another and their children.

Burt and Verona next visit Verona's sister Grace, in Tucson. Verona urges Burt to try to persuade Grace to stay with her boring boyfriend. When Burt takes a call and displays his trademark humor, Grace tells Verona that she is lucky to have him and Verona agrees.

They next visit Burt's childhood friend and pseudo-cousin in Madison, Wisconsin, "LN" (pronounced "ellen"), a college professor at the University of Wisconsin with inherited money and radical views about parenting. They bring a stroller as a gift, greatly angering LN as she and her husband Roderick's is a "continuum home."

Roderick's condescension and LN's backhanded compliments to Verona get to be too much for Burt, so he tells them they are horrible people. He and Verona leave but not before taking their son on a wild stroller ride through the house (which he enjoys).

Burt and Verona then visit old college friends in Montreal, Tom and his wife, Munch Garnett, and their diverse family of adopted children. Verona and Burt are happy to have found a loving family and a nice town, deciding to move to Montreal. When they all go to dinner, Burt admits he has proposed to Verona many times, but she always refuses (this stems from anguish over her dead parents' inevitable absence from the wedding). After dinner, Tom tells Burt that Munch has recently suffered her fifth miscarriage and that they seem unable to have biological children.

In the morning, Burt receives an emergency call from his brother Courtney, in Miami, whose wife has left him. Burt and Verona fly to Miami, where Courtney worries about his young daughter and the potential effects of a divorce on her. Burt tries to comfort Courtney while Verona spends time with his daughter. Burt and Verona spend the night outside on a trampoline, promising to love each other and their daughter and have a happy home.

The next day, Verona tells Burt a story about her childhood house and her parents (who were both killed in a car crash when she was 22). Moved by her memory, they decide to settle in Verona's old family home on the Florida panhandle. Realizing it is the place for them, they sit together happily, overlooking the water.

== Cast ==
- John Krasinski as Burt Farlander
- Maya Rudolph as Verona De Tessant
- Carmen Ejogo as Grace De Tessant
- Jeff Daniels as Jerry Farlander
- Catherine O'Hara as Gloria Farlander
- Allison Janney as Lily
- Jim Gaffigan as Lowell
- Maggie Gyllenhaal as LN
- Josh Hamilton as Roderick
- Melanie Lynskey as Munch Garnett
- Chris Messina as Tom Garnett
- Paul Schneider as Courtney Farlander

== Release ==
Away We Go had a limited theater release in the United States starting June 25, 2009. It opened the 2009 Edinburgh International Film Festival in Edinburgh, Scotland. The film was released on DVD and Blu-ray Disc on September 29, 2009.

=== Critical reception ===
On Rotten Tomatoes, the film has an approval rating of 67% based on 192 reviews, with an average rating of 6.80/10. The critical consensus reads, "Built on a set of quirks and charms that are as noticeable as they are interchangeable, Away We Go is a sweet but uneven road trip". Metacritic reported the film had an average score of 58 out of 100, based on 33 reviews.

A. O. Scott of The New York Times described the two main characters as self-righteous people "aware of their special status as uniquely sensitive, caring, smart and cool beings on a planet full of cretins and failures".

In response to reviews "accusing Verona and Burt of being smug, superior and condescending," Roger Ebert said that "these are not sins if you have something to be smug about and much reason to condescend." He gave the film three-and-a-half out of four stars.

== Soundtrack ==
The soundtrack of Away We Go was released on June 2, 2009, and primarily features songs from singer/songwriter Alexi Murdoch, instead of an original film score.

(All songs by Alexi Murdoch except where noted)

1. "All My Days" (4:57)
2. "Blue Mind" (5:45)
3. "What Is Life" by George Harrison (4:24)
4. "Song for You" (4:38)
5. "Golden Brown" by The Stranglers (3:30)
6. "Towards the Sun" (4:40)
7. "Meet Me in the Morning" by Bob Dylan (4:21)
8. "Breathe" (4:18)
9. "Wait" (5:59)
10. "The Ragged Sea" (3:19)
11. "Oh! Sweet Nuthin'" by The Velvet Underground (7:28)
12. "Orange Sky" (6:18)
13. "Crinan Wood" (5:45)

"All My Days" was featured in the film's trailer.
