= Chris Chaney =

American bassist (born 1970)

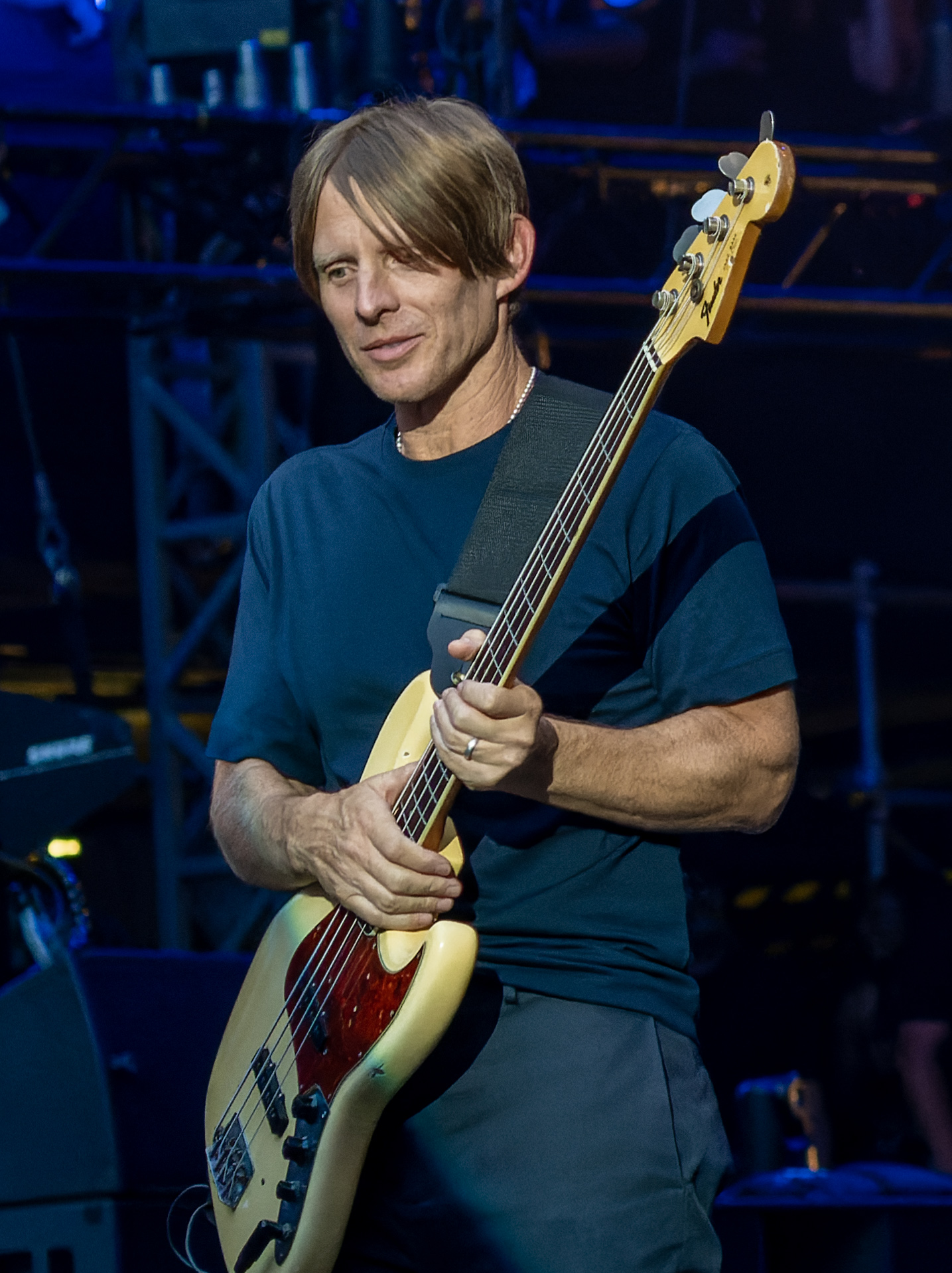
- Chaney at Taylor Hawkins tribute concert in 2022.

Background information
- Born: June 14, 1970 (age 56)
- Genres: Alternative rock; hard rock; funk rock; pop rock; post-grunge; heavy metal; alternative metal; nu metal; rap metal
- Occupation: Bassist
- Years active: 1990s–present
- Member of: AC/DC
- Formerly of: Jane's Addiction; Camp Freddy; The Panic Channel; Taylor Hawkins and the Coattail Riders; Alanis Morissette; Methods of Mayhem; Slash; Shinedown; Eddie Vedder and the Earthlings
- Spouse: Tifanie Christun

Christopher A. Chaney (born June 14, 1970) is an American musician. He is best known as the former bassist of the alternative rock band Jane's Addiction, with whom he recorded two studio albums. He is the touring bassist for AC/DC, replacing longstanding member Cliff Williams on the band's Power Up Tour. Chaney has previously been a member of Alanis Morissette's touring and recording band for six years as well as Taylor Hawkins and the Coattail Riders and Camp Freddy.

Chaney has played with a variety of recording artists, ranging from Joe Satriani, Joe Cocker, Shakira, Slash, Beth Hart, Adam Lambert, Alanis Morissette, Avril Lavigne, Bryan Adams, Sara Bareilles, Gavin DeGraw, Cher, John Fogerty, Lisa Marie Presley, Meat Loaf, Rob Zombie, Romeo Santos, James Blunt, Shinedown, Robben Ford, and Celine Dion.

== Biography ==
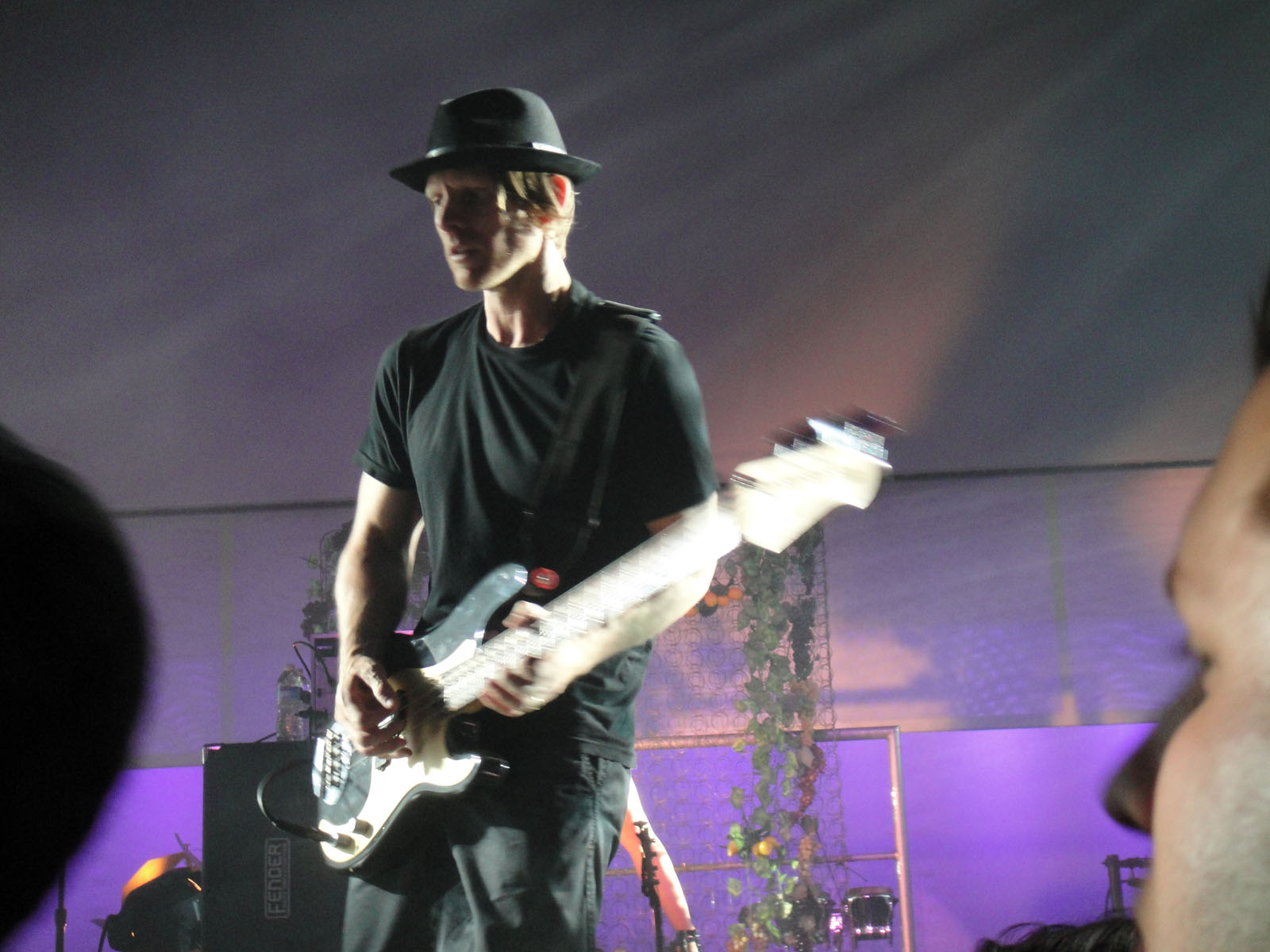
Chaney performing with Jane's Addiction at E3 2011

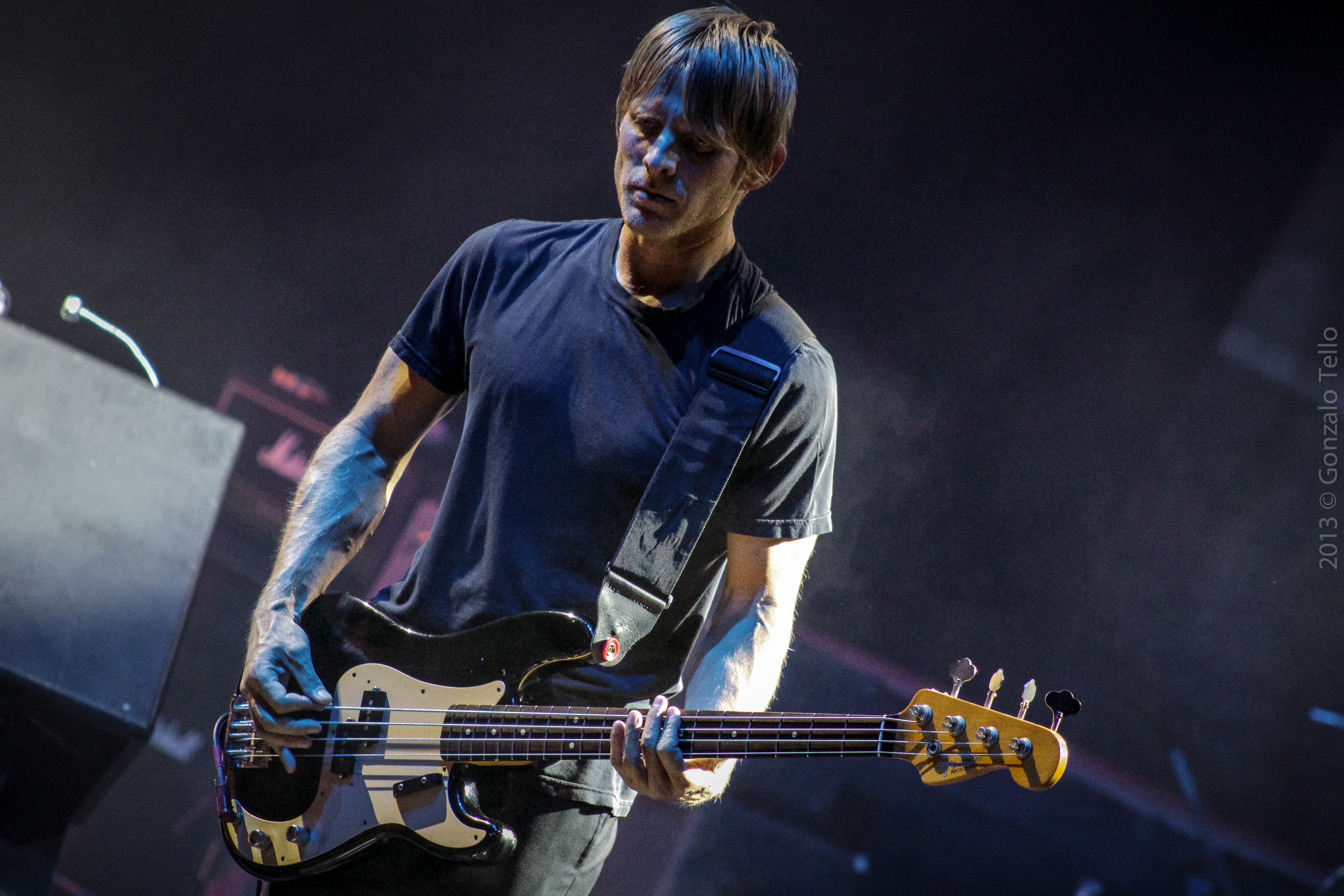
Chaney performing with Jane's Addiction in 2013

Chaney was raised in Mill Valley, California. He attended Berklee College of Music, and then moved to Los Angeles in 1991 to pursue music and played at the L.A. jazz club The Baked Potato and the Dragonfly in Hollywood. Chaney was first invited to tour with Alanis Morissette in 1995 on the Jagged Little Pill Tour and continued to work with Morissette until 2001, appearing on three studio albums and two live albums.

While working with Morissette, Chaney developed a reputation as a versatile professional bassist. He has since recorded and/or toured with a wide variety of artists. His next high-profile job was as the full-time replacement for Eric Avery in the 2002 reunion of Jane's Addiction, contributing to the album Strays. He then formed the band The Panic Channel with Dave Navarro and Stephen Perkins of Jane's Addiction; the group released the album (ONe) in 2006. In 2006, he joined the band Taylor Hawkins and the Coattail Riders, formed by Taylor Hawkins of the Foo Fighters. Chaney and Hawkins had previously worked together in Morissette's band. The group released the albums Taylor Hawkins and the Coattail Riders in 2006 and Red Light Fever in 2010. Chaney is also bassist for all-star cover band Camp Freddy.

Chaney has played with several recording artists and over 25 film scores and soundtracks. Artists include: Celine Dion, Eddie Vedder, Ozzy Osbourne, Michelle Branch, Ben Taylor, Eric Hutchinson, Carly Simon, Rob Zombie, Joe Satriani, Andrew W.K., Tommy Lee's Methods of Mayhem, and Will Hoge. He joined Johnny Rzeznik of The Goo Goo Dolls for the song "I'm Still Here" from soundtrack to the animated movie Treasure Planet. He is also featured on the 2007 album Little Voice by Sara Bareilles, and the 2008 album The Sound of Madness by Shinedown (replacing departed bassist Brad Stewart). Chaney has worked with James Stephen Hart on his project Burn Halo. Chaney is featured as the primary bassist on guitarist Slash's 2010 solo album, Slash. In March 2010, Slash described Chaney as a "godsend", stating: "Chris is just the best session player that I know so I called him up. I didn’t want to use Duff McKagan so I was tryin’ to think of bass players and Chris I’ve worked with so many times and he's easy going, and he learns quickly." In 2022, Chaney played bass on Beth Hart’s “A Tribute to Led Zeppelin” album and will join Eddie Vedder's band in the Earthlings tour.

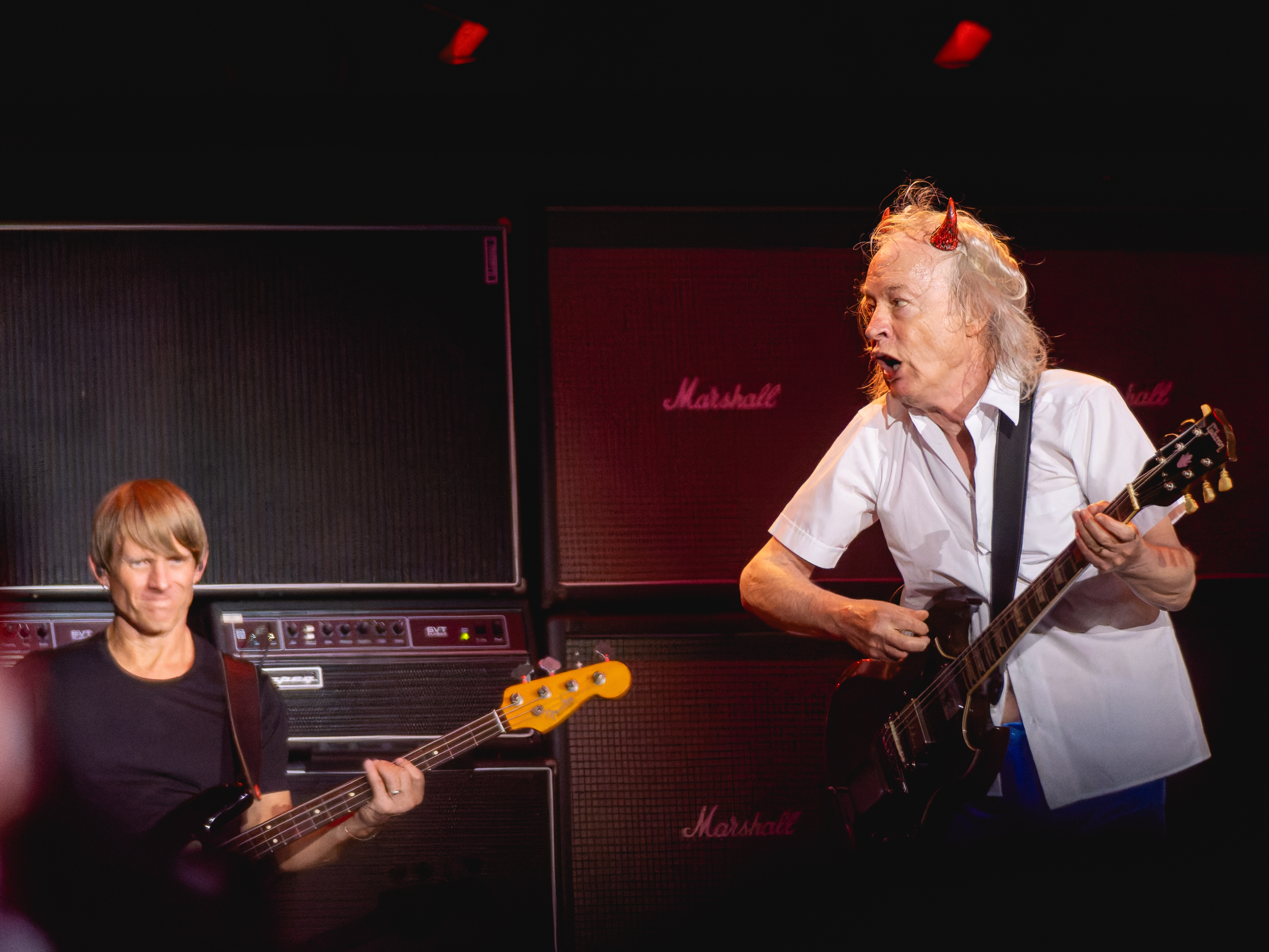
Chaney and Angus Young (right) performing with AC/DC in 2024

On February 12, 2024, AC/DC announced that Chaney would support them on their upcoming European Tour as a replacement for Cliff Williams.

He is married to voice actress Tifanie Christun, daughter of Cheryl Saban and the stepdaughter of Haim Saban.

=== Influences ===
Chaney's influences include Geddy Lee, John Paul Jones of Led Zeppelin, Paul McCartney, James Jamerson, Jaco Pastorius, Marcus Miller, and Stevie Wonder.

== Gear ==
Chaney has endorsements with Aguilar Amps, Dunlop, and Audimute. In June 2025 Dusenberg released a signature bass for Chaney, based on a Fender P

As of the June 2003 issue of Bass Player magazine, Chaney's gear listing for recording and touring was as follows:

=== Basses ===
- ’62 and ’66 Fender Jazz Basses
- ’58, ’59, and ’60 Fender Precision Basses
- Fender Custom Shop Jazz Bass with pearl-inlays and Basslines pickups
- Two Lakland Bob Glaub models
- Lakland hollowbody four-string
- Lakland Joe Osborn five-string
- Four Sadowsky Jazz Basses (two four-string and two five-string models)
- Guild M85
- Guild Starfire
- Höfner hollowbody (strung with flatwound strings)
- Gibson EB-2
- Gibson Ripper
- Epiphone Jack Casady model and El Capitan acoustic bass guitars
- Rob Allen fretless four-string semi-acoustic bass with Basslines pickups and La Bella tapewound strings
- Meisel plywood upright with Helicore strings.
- D'Addario strings

=== Amplifiers and speaker cabinets ===
- Aguilar DB 900 DI
- Aguilar DB 680 preamp
- Avalon U5 DI/preamp
- Ashdown ABM500 2x10" combo amplifier
- Two Aguilar DB 750 heads (large venues)
- Two Aguilar GS 412 4x12" speaker cabinets (large venues)

=== Rackmounted gear and effects ===
- Furman Power Conditioner
- Korg DTR-1 tuner
- Line 6 Echo Pro
- Line 6 Mod Pro
- Empirical Labs Distressor compressor
- Line 6 Bass Pod Pro
- Digital Music Corp. GCX switcher
- Digital Music Corp. Ground Control Pro
- Big Briar Moogerfooger
- Roland Jet Phaser
- Musictronics Mu-tron III envelope filter
- Prescription Electronic Depth Charge overdrive
- Z. Vex Wooly Mammoth overdrive
- DigiTech Synth Wah
- Budda Phatbass tube overdrive
- MXR M-80 DI Overdrive
- Big Muff
- EBS OctaBass
- Boss OC-2 Octave
- MXR M-88 octaver
- Pefftronics Rand-O-Matic
- Electro-Harmonix Q-Tron
- DigiTech Bass Whammy
- Carl Martin compressor
- Carl Martin stereo chorus

== Discography ==
- 2020 I'm Nothing, Damián Gaume, Bass
- 2020 Shapeshifting, Joe Satriani, bass and rhythm guitar (one track)
- 2019 Ex Nihilo, Figure 8, Bass
- 2014 Anticipated Releases: LP, Bryan Adams
- 2013 All That Echoes, Josh Groban, Bass
- 2013 Classic Album Collection, Rob Zombie, Bass
- 2013 Closer to the Truth, Cher, Bass
- 2013 Heartthrob, Tegan and Sara, Bass
- 2013 Unstoppable Momentum, Joe Satriani, Bass
- 2013 Live in NYC, Jane's Addiction, Composer and bass
- 2012 Fire It Up, Joe Cocker, Bass
- 2012 Into the Wild: Live at EastWest Studios, LP, Bass
- 2011 Formula, Vol. 1, Romeo Santos, Bass
- 2011 Ghost on the Canvas, Glen Campbell, Bass
- 2011 People and Things, Jack's Mannequin, Bass
- 2011 Sweeter, Gavin DeGraw, Bass
- 2011 The Great Escape Artist, Jane's Addiction, Bass
- 2011 This Loud Morning, David Cook, Bass
- 2010 A Public Disservice Announcement, Methods of Mayhem, Bass
- 2010 Hang Cool Teddy Bear, Meat Loaf, Bass
- 2010 Hard Knocks, Joe Cocker, Bass
- 2010 Red Light Fever, Taylor Hawkins and the Coattail Riders, Bass
- 2010 Slash, Slash, Bass
- 2010 Some Kind of Trouble, James Blunt, Bass
- 2010 The Band Perry, The Band Perry, Bass
- 2010 The Other Side of Down, David Archuleta, Bass
- 2009 A Very Special Christmas 7, Bass
- 2009 Believe, Orianthi, Bass
- 2009 For Your Entertainment, Adam Lambert, Bass
- 2009 The Blue Ridge Rangers Rides Again, John Fogerty, Bass
- 2009 The Boy Who Never, Landon Pigg, Bass
- 2008 Break the Silence, Jon Peter Lewis, Bass
- 2008 Gavin DeGraw, Gavin DeGraw, Bass
- 2008 Meet Glen Campbell, Glen Campbell, Bass
- 2008 My Love: Essential Collection, Celine Dion, Bass
- 2008 The Sound of Madness, Shinedown, Bass
- 2007 This Moment, Steven Curtis Chapman, Bass on tracks 2, 3, 4, 7, 10 & 11
- 2007 Angels & Devils, Fuel, Bass
- 2007 Little Voice, Sara Bareilles, Bass
- 2007 The Best Damn Thing, Avril Lavigne, Bass
- 2006 (ONe), The Panic Channel, Bass
- 2006 Daughtry, Daughtry, Bass on "What About Now"
- 2006 Every Man for Himself, Hoobastank, Bass on tracks 3, 5, 9, 10
- 2006 Now & Then, Steven Curtis Chapman, Bass
- 2006 Taylor Hawkins and the Coattail Riders, Taylor Hawkins and the Coattail Riders, Bass
- 2006 Time Without Consequence, Alexi Murdoch, Bass
- 2006 Up from the Catacombs – The Best of Jane's Addiction, Jane's Addiction, Bass tracks 7 & 9
- 2005 Oral Fixation, Vol. 2, Shakira, Bass
- 2005 Oral Fixation, Vol. 1, Shakira, Bass
- 2005 Now What, Lisa Marie Presley, Bass
- 2004 All Things New, Steven Curtis Chapman, Bass on tracks 1–11
- 2004 E.P. #1, Ben Taylor, Composer
- 2004 Electro Addiction: An Electro Tribute to Jane's Addiction, Composer
- 2004 Pictures from Home, John Gregory, Bass
- 2003 Hotel Paper, Michelle Branch, Bass
- 2003 One Heart, Celine Dion, Bass
- 2003 Strays, Jane's Addiction, Bass
- 2002 Christmas Is Almost Here, Carly Simon, Bass
- 2002 Feast on Scraps, Alanis Morissette, Bass
- 2002 Never a Dull Moment, Tommy Lee, Bass
- 2002 Under Rug Swept, Alanis Morissette, Bass
- 2001 I Get Wet, Andrew W.K., Bass
- 2001 The Sinister Urge, Rob Zombie, Bass
- 2000 Love Life, Warren Hill, Bass
- 1999 Alanis Unplugged, Alanis Morissette, Bass
- 1999 Methods of Mayhem, Methods of Mayhem, Bass
- 1998 Supposed Former Infatuation Junkie, Alanis Morissette, Bass
- 1997 Tibetan Freedom Concert, Bass on disc 2 track 11

=== Film scores and soundtrack credits ===
- 1998 City of Angels (Original Soundtrack), Bass
- 1998 The Waterboy, Bass
- 1999 Dogma (Original Soundtrack), Howard Shore, Bass (Electric)
- 1999 The Other Sister, Bass
- 2003 Now, DVD Composer
- 2003 Wicked: A New Musical (Original Broadway Cast Recording), Bass
- 2005 40 Year Old Virgin, Bass
- 2006 Employee of the Month, Bass
- 2007 300 (Original Motion Picture Soundtrack - The Collector's Edition), Tyler Bates, Bass (Electric)
- 2007 Treasure Planet (Original Motion Picture Score), James Newton Howard, Bass
- 2009 2012, Thomas Wander, Bass
- 2009 Watchmen (Original Motion Picture Score), Tyler Bates, Bass (Electric)
- 2010 Burlesque, Bass
- 2010 Date Night, Bass
- 2010 Due Date, Bass
- 2010 Red, Bass
- 2010 Dinner for Schmucks, Theodore Shapiro, Bass
- 2010 Get Him to the Greek, Bass
- 2011 Arthur, Bass
- 2011 Sucker Punch, Bass
- 2011 Real Steel, Bass
- 2011 Horrible Bosses, Bass
- 2012 Men in Black 3, Danny Elfman, Bass
- 2012 The Campaign, Bass
- 2013 The Hangover Trilogy, Hollywood Studio Symphony, Bass
- 2013 Identity Theft, Bass
