= Taylor Hawkins and the Coattail Riders (album) =

Taylor Hawkins & The Coattail Riders
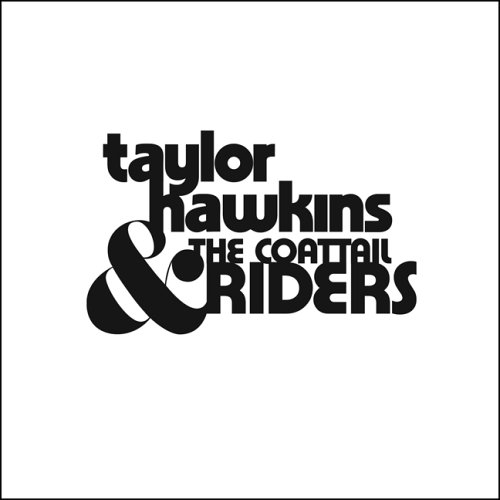

Studio album by Taylor Hawkins & The Coattail Riders
- Released: March 21, 2006
- Recorded: 2005–2006
- Genre: Alternative rock, Hard rock
- Length: 39:28
- Label: Thrive
- Producer: Drew Hester; Taylor Hawkins

Taylor Hawkins & The Coattail Riders chronology
Taylor Hawkins & The Coattail Riders (2006)	Red Light Fever (2010)

Singles from Taylor Hawkins & The Coattail Riders
- 1. "Louise/It's OK Now" Released: 2006

Professional ratings
Review scores
Source	Rating
Allmusic	3.5/5 stars

Taylor Hawkins & The Coattail Riders is the debut album by the band Taylor Hawkins & The Coattail Riders. It was released in 2006 through Thrive Records. It features 11 songs which were recorded by the band during 2004, before Foo Fighters started recording In Your Honor.

The album art is a homage to James Gang Rides Again, the second album by James Gang, of whom Taylor Hawkins is a big fan (he also wrote a song about the band on the Coattail Riders' second album).

== Track listing ==
All tracks are written by Taylor Hawkins, except where noted.

No.	Title	Writer(s)	Length
1.	"Louise"		2:45
2.	"Walking Away"		3:15
3.	"Running in Place"		5:55
4.	"NOA"		0:39
5.	"It's OK Now"	Hawkins; Curtis Matheson	4:47
6.	"End of the Line"	Hawkins; Wiley Hodgden	3:45
7.	"You Drive Me Insane..."		3:42
8.	"Wasted Energy"		3:02
9.	"Get Up I Want to Get Down"		3:02
10.	"Pitiful"		3:02
11.	"Better You Than Me" (incl. hidden track "Perfect Day")		5:34
Total length:			39:21

Australian bonus track
No.	Title	Length
12.	"Don't Forget" (incl. hidden track "Perfect Day")	4:56
Total length:		42:33

Japanese bonus track
No.	Title	Length
12.	"Sorry" (incl. hidden track "Perfect Day")	5:02
Total length:		42:39

- The hidden track "Perfect Day" plays after "Better You Than Me" on international versions of the album. On the Australian and Japanese releases, "Better You Than Me" runs 3:50 and "Perfect Day" is appended to "Don't Forget" and "Sorry", respectively, instead.

== Personnel ==
Personnel taken from Taylor Hawkins and the Coattail Riders liner notes.

Taylor Hawkins and the Coattail Riders

- Taylor Hawkins – vocals, drums
- Gannin Arnold – guitar
- Chris Chaney – bass guitar

Technical personnel

- Drew Hester – production
- Taylor Hawkins – production
