= Red Light Fever (Taylor Hawkins and the Coattail Riders album) =

Studio album by Taylor Hawkins and the Coattail Riders
- Released: April 20, 2010
- Recorded: Studio 606
- Genre: Alternative rock
- Length: 46:23
- Label: Shanabelle/RCA
- Producer: Drew Hester

Taylor Hawkins and the Coattail Riders chronology
Taylor Hawkins and the Coattail Riders (2006)	Red Light Fever (2010)	Get the Money (2019)

Professional ratings
Review scores
Source	Rating
Allmusic	3.5/5 stars
Consequence of Sound	3/5 stars

Red Light Fever is the second album by the band Taylor Hawkins and the Coattail Riders. It was released April 20, 2010 and features guest stars Brian May and Roger Taylor of Queen, Dave Grohl of Foo Fighters and Elliot Easton of The Cars.

== Track listing ==
All tracks are written by Taylor Hawkins & The Coattail Riders.

No.	Title	Length
1.	"Not Bad Luck"	3:34
2.	"Your Shoes"	2:53
3.	"Way Down"	3:48
4.	"It's Over"	4:21
5.	"Hell To Pay"	4:59
6.	"Sunshine"	3:34
7.	"Never Enough"	5:23
8.	"Hole In My Shoe"	3:55
9.	"James Gang"	3:35
10.	"Don't Have To Speak"	3:45
11.	"I Can See It Now"	3:16
12.	"I Don't Think I Trust You Anymore"	3:33
Total length:		46:36

iTunes pre-order bonus track
No.	Title	Length
13.	"Fall Apart"	4:25
Total length:		51:01

Japanese bonus track
No.	Title	Length
13.	"Shape of Things"	3:33
Total length:		50:09

== Personnel ==
- Taylor Hawkins - lead vocals, drums, piano, guitar
- Chris Chaney - bass
- Gannin Arnold - lead guitar, backing vocals

=== Additional personnel ===
- Brian May - guitar and backing vocals on "Way Down" and guitar on "Don't Have to Speak"
- Roger Taylor - backing vocals on "Your Shoes"
- Dave Grohl - rhythm guitar, vocals
- Elliot Easton - guitar, backing vocals
- Nate Wood - guitar
- Drew Hester - percussion, backing vocals
