= Time Without Consequence =

Studio album by Alexi Murdoch
- Released: 6 June 2006
- Recorded: 2004–2006
- Studio: Sage and Sound, Los Angeles
- Genre: Indie folk; folk rock; contemporary folk
- Length: 59:35
- Label: Zero Summer
- Producer: Alexi Murdoch

Alexi Murdoch chronology
Four Songs (2002)	Time Without Consequence (2006)	Towards the Sun (2011)

Professional ratings
Review scores
Source	Rating
AllMusic	3.5/5 stars
Pitchfork	5.7/10

Time Without Consequence is the debut studio album by British singer-songwriter Alexi Murdoch. It was released on 6 June 2006 by Zero Summer. The album features re-recorded songs "Song for You", "Blue Mind", and "Orange Sky" from Murdoch's Four Songs EP.

== Songs used in media ==
The songs "Orange Sky" (S1 E5 - "English, Fitz or Percy") and "Home" (S2 E16 – "Chicago") have both featured in the Fox television series Prison Break.

"All My Days" was featured during the closing moments of "The Cold Turkey", the third episode of the fourth season of The O.C.. "Orange Sky" was featured on The O.C.'s first soundtrack, Music from the OC: Mix 1. "All My Days" was featured in the Syfy series Stargate Universe, in episode 13, "Faith". The song was featured in the film Away We Go, which Murdoch also provided the soundtrack for, and was the title song in Real Steel. It played over the ending of season 1 episode 11 of Selfie. It was also featured in the Sprint Girl commercial for the Samsung Galaxy S III Unlimited Edition by Sprint Nextel.

"Breathe" was featured in a 2008 commercial for the Nissan Titan. "Breathe" was also featured on the show Stargate Universe, in the episode "Air, Part 3" and in Continuum third season episode "Minute Changes".

== Track listing ==
All tracks are written by Alexi Murdoch

No.	Title	Length
1.	"All My Days"	4:57
2.	"Breathe"	4:17
3.	"Home"	5:50
4.	"Song for You"	4:38
5.	"Dream About Flying"	4:50
6.	"Wait"	5:57
7.	"Love You More"	2:36
8.	"Blue Mind"	5:43
9.	"Shine"	7:46
10.	"12"	6:50
11.	"Orange Sky"	6:11

== Personnel ==
- Jim Keltner - drums
- Greg Leisz - guitar, pedal steel guitar
- Pete Thomas - tom tom
- Jay Bellerose - drums, tambourine, percussion
- Alexi Murdoch - vocals, guitar, slide guitar, piano, harmonium, organ, keyboards, snare drum, cymbals, tambourine
- Zac Rae - keyboards, vibraphone
- Joel Shearer - guitar, shaker, background vocals
- Deron Johnson - Fender Rhodes piano
- Ben Peeler - lap steel guitar
- Marvin Etzioni - mandolin
- James SK Wān - bamboo flute
- Sophie Barker - background vocals
- Brett Simons - double bass, electric bass
- Oliver Kraus - cello
- Al Sgro - drums, background vocals
- Jason McKenzie - tabla
- Ramy Antoun - drums
