= Taylor Hawkins =

American drummer (1972–2022)

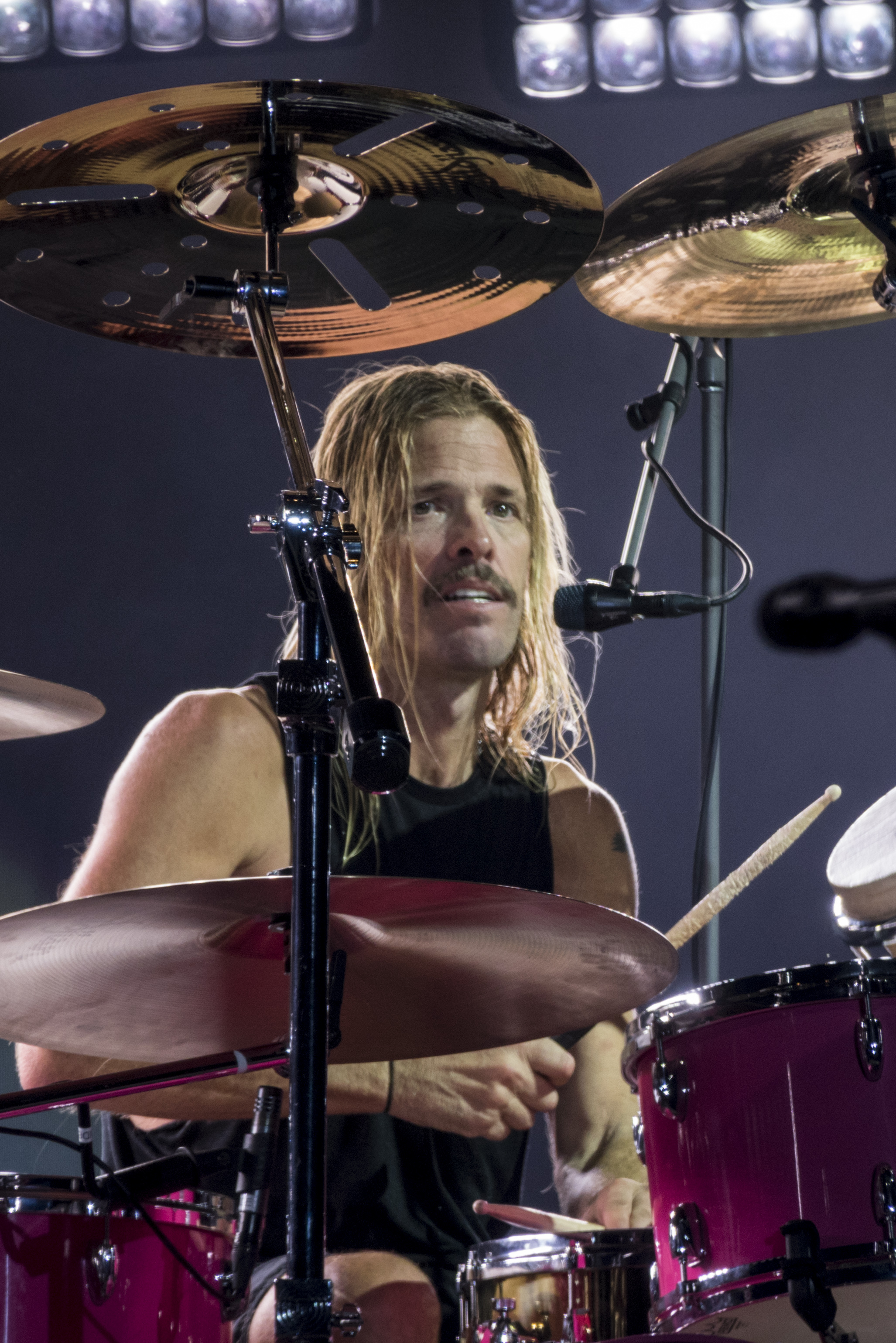
- Hawkins performing with Foo Fighters in 2017

Background information
- Born: Oliver Taylor Hawkins; February 17, 1972; Fort Worth, Texas, U.S.
- Origin: Laguna Beach, California, U.S.
- Died: March 25, 2022 (aged 50) Bogotá, Colombia
- Genres: Alternative rock; post-grunge; hard rock; alternative metal; progressive rock
- Occupations: Musician; singer
- Instruments: Drums; vocals; percussion; guitar; piano
- Years active: 1992–2022
- Formerly of: Foo Fighters; Taylor Hawkins and the Coattail Riders; Anyone; The Birds of Satan; Sound City Players
- Website: taylorhawkins.com

Oliver Taylor Hawkins (February 17, 1972 – March 25, 2022) was an American musician who was the drummer and a vocalist of the rock band Foo Fighters, sharing vocals with Dave Grohl. He joined the band in 1997, and remained the band's drummer until his death in March 2022. He recorded eight studio albums with Foo Fighters between 1999 and 2021. Before joining the band, he was a touring drummer for Sass Jordan and Alanis Morissette, as well as the drummer of the progressive experimental band Sylvia.

In 2004, Hawkins formed his own side project, Taylor Hawkins and the Coattail Riders, in which he played drums and sang, releasing three studio albums between 2006 and 2019. He formed the supergroup NHC with Jane's Addiction members Dave Navarro and Chris Chaney in 2020, where he also took on lead vocal and drumming duties.

One year before his death, Hawkins was inducted into the Rock and Roll Hall of Fame in 2021 as a member of Foo Fighters. He was voted "Best Rock Drummer" in 2005 by the British drumming magazine Rhythm. After his death, the Foo Fighters and his family announced two tribute shows, which took place in September 2022.

== Early life ==
Oliver Taylor Hawkins was born in Fort Worth, Texas, on February 17, 1972. His family moved to Laguna Beach, California, in 1976, where Hawkins grew up. Hawkins was the youngest of three, with an older brother and sister, Jason and Heather. He graduated from Laguna Beach High School in 1990, where he had been friends with future Yes lead vocalist Jon Davison.

== Career ==
=== Early career ===
Hawkins played in the Orange County–based band Sylvia before he became the drummer for Sass Jordan.

From June 1995 until March 1997, Hawkins was Alanis Morissette's drummer on the tour supporting Jagged Little Pill and her Can't Not tour. He appeared in the videos for "You Oughta Know", "All I Really Want", and "You Learn". He also appeared on Morissette's VHS/DVD Jagged Little Pill, Live (1997).

=== Foo Fighters ===
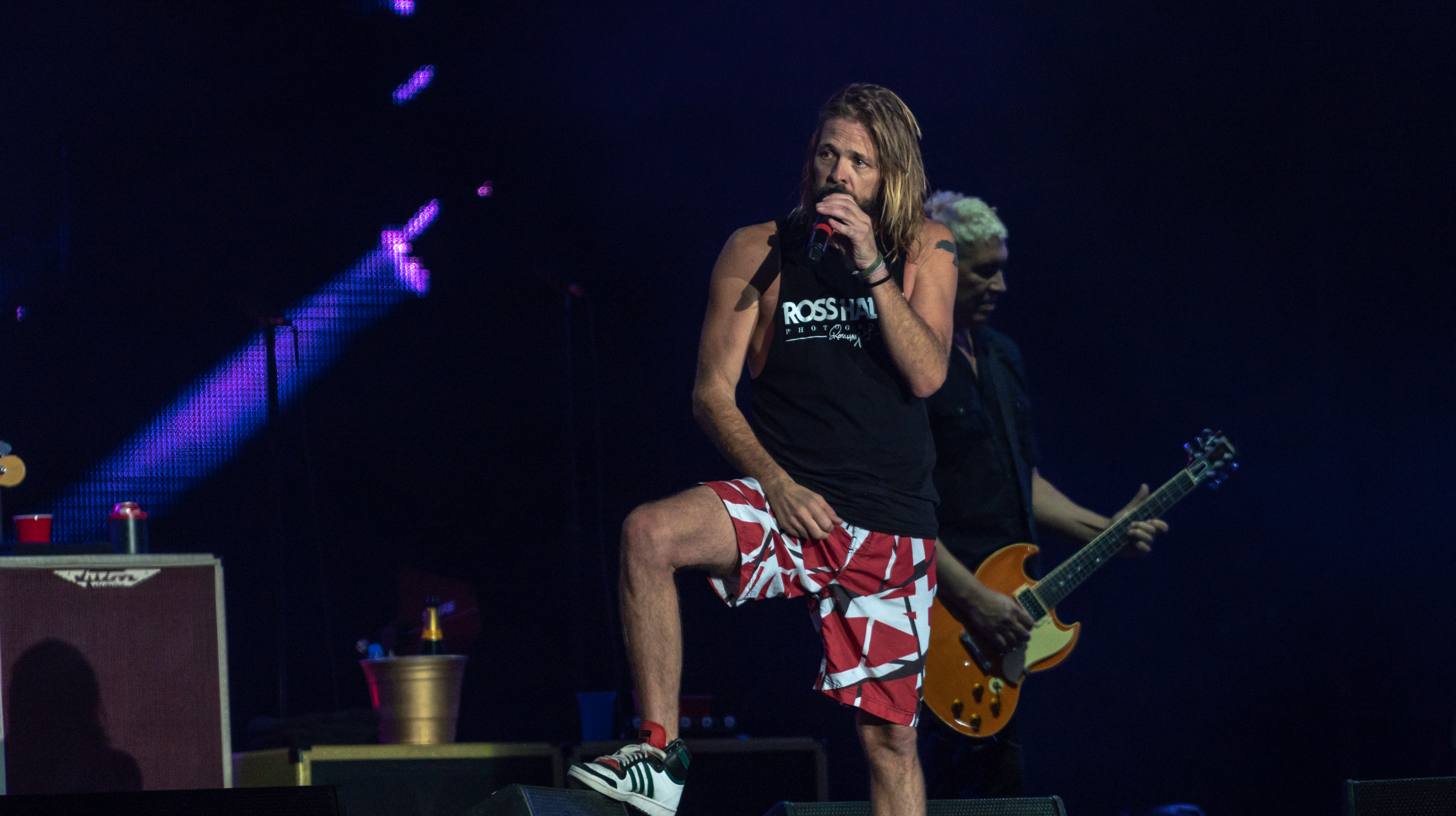
Hawkins singing during a Foo Fighters concert in 2018

After touring through the spring of 1996, Foo Fighters entered a Seattle studio with producer Gil Norton to record their second album. Conflict during recording reportedly erupted between Dave Grohl and drummer William Goldsmith, eventually causing Goldsmith to leave the band. The band regrouped in Los Angeles and almost completely re-recorded the album with Grohl on drums. The album, The Colour and the Shape, was released on May 20, 1997. Grohl called Hawkins, an acquaintance at the time, seeking his recommendations for a new drummer to join the band. Grohl assumed that Hawkins would not want to leave Morissette's touring band, given she was a bigger act than Foo Fighters at the time. To Grohl's surprise, however, Hawkins volunteered to join the band himself, explaining that he wanted to be a drummer in a rock band rather than for a solo act. The band announced Hawkins would be its new drummer on March 18, 1997. Hawkins first appeared with the Foo Fighters in the music video for the 1997 single "Monkey Wrench", although the song was recorded before he joined the band.

In addition to his drumming with the Foo Fighters, Hawkins provided vocals, guitar, and piano to various recordings. He performed the lead vocal on a cover of Pink Floyd's "Have a Cigar". Two versions of the song were released, one as the B-side to "Learn to Fly" and another on the Mission: Impossible 2 soundtrack album. He later sang lead vocals on "Cold Day in the Sun" from In Your Honor, which was later released as a single, as well as a cover of Cream's "I Feel Free", which appeared as the B-side of "DOA" and on the EP Five Songs and a Cover. Hawkins also sang lead vocals for the band's cover of Joe Walsh's "Life of Illusion". Later, he sang lead vocals for "Sunday Rain", a track on the Foo Fighters' 2017 album Concrete and Gold. He sang lead vocals on some songs during Foo Fighters live shows, particularly covers, such as Van Halen's "Ain't Talkin' 'bout Love" and Queen's "Somebody To Love", the latter of which he performed during what became his final concert with the band. He also contributed to the band's songwriting, and was listed as a co-writer on at least one song on every Foo Fighters album from There Is Nothing Left to Lose to Medicine at Midnight.

Hawkins's final performance with the Foo Fighters before his death was at the Lollapalooza Argentina festival on March 20, 2022. Hawkins posthumously won three Grammys with the Foo Fighters on April 3, 2022.

=== Other projects ===
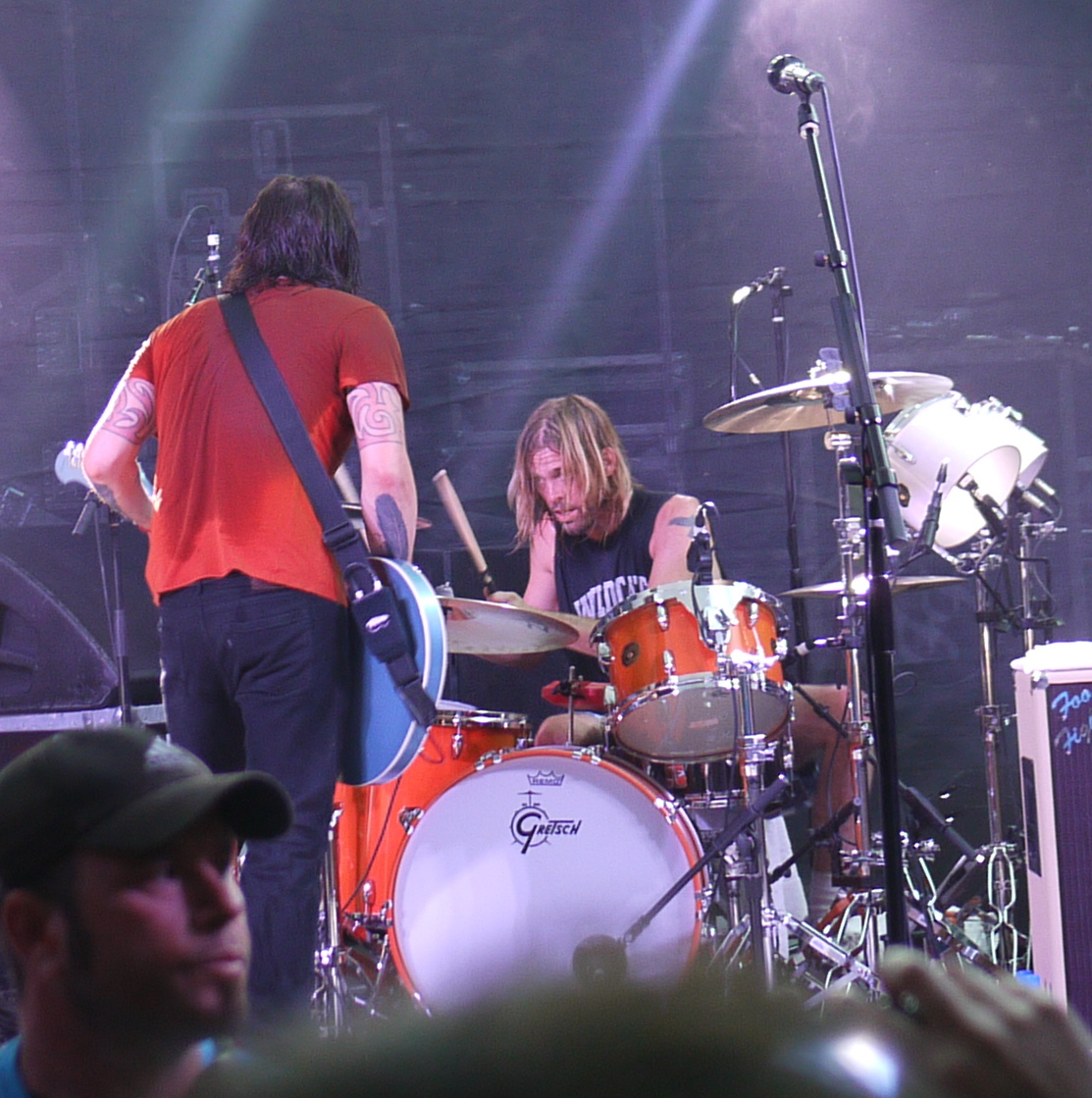
Hawkins playing with the Foo Fighters in Austin, Texas, in 2011

In 2000, Hawkins was contacted by Guns N' Roses to replace Josh Freese on drums. Hawkins seriously considered the offer before Roger Taylor convinced him to remain in Foo Fighters. In 2006, Hawkins released a self-titled LP with his side project, Taylor Hawkins and the Coattail Riders. Taylor Hawkins and the Coattail Riders subsequently released two more studio albums: Red Light Fever in 2010, and Get the Money in 2019. He occasionally played with a Police cover band alternately called the Cops and Fallout. At Live Earth in 2007, Hawkins was part of SOS Allstars with Roger Taylor of Queen and Chad Smith of Red Hot Chili Peppers.

Hawkins recorded the drum tracks for the Coheed and Cambria album Good Apollo, I'm Burning Star IV, Volume Two: No World for Tomorrow as the band's regular drummer, Chris Pennie, could not record because of contractual reasons. Hawkins also toured with Coheed and Cambria shortly during the months of the album. Hawkins can also be heard drumming on Eric Avery's (formerly of Jane's Addiction) first solo effort, Help Wanted and on Kerry Ellis's album, Wicked in Rock. Hawkins and Grohl split drumming duties on Harmony & Dissidence, the third album by Foo Fighters bandmate Chris Shiflett's own side project, Jackson United.

Hawkins played on the track "Cyborg", from Queen guitarist Brian May's 1998 solo album, Another World; he also played drums at VH1's Rock Honors 2006 while Queen performed "We Will Rock You". He sang backing vocals on the Queen + Paul Rodgers single, "C-lebrity".

Hawkins was commissioned to complete an unfinished recording of a song by Beach Boys' drummer Dennis Wilson titled "Holy Man" by writing and singing new lyrics. The recording, which also featured contributions from Brian May and Roger Taylor of Queen, was issued as a single for Record Store Day in 2019.

While the Foo Fighters were on break in 2013, Hawkins formed a rock cover band called Chevy Metal.

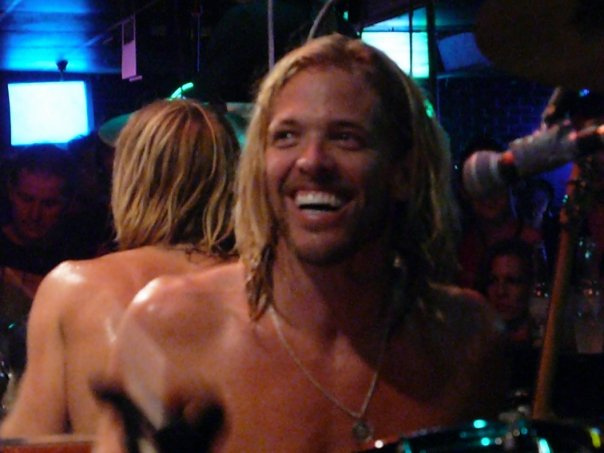
Hawkins in 2012

Hawkins appeared on Slash's solo album Slash, released in 2010, providing backing vocals on the track "Crucify the Dead", featuring Ozzy Osbourne.

In 2013, he made his acting debut in the role of Iggy Pop in the rock film CBGB. Hawkins recorded the drums on Vasco Rossi's last song, "L'uomo più semplice". This song was released on January 21, 2013, in Italy.

In March 2014, Hawkins announced his new side project called the Birds of Satan. It features Hawkins's drum technician and bandmate from Chevy Metal, Wiley Hodgden on bass guitar and vocals as well as guitarist Mick Murphy also of Chevy Metal. The band's self-titled debut album was released in April 2014, with a release party at 'Rock n Roll Pizza' featuring the Foo Fighters guesting on some of the cover tracks.

In an interview with Radio X, Hawkins revealed that his initial idea with his solo projects was to duet with female singers.

Hawkins invited other stars to sing in the Taylor Hawkins and the Coattail Riders album Get the Money, such as LeAnn Rimes, who sang on one of his songs titled "C U In Hell". Loudwire named the album one of the 50 best rock efforts of 2019. Other musicians who appeared on his projects included Roger Taylor, Brian May, Dave Grohl, Nancy Wilson, Joe Walsh, Chrissie Hynde, and many more.

In October 2021, Elton John released The Lockdown Sessions, which featured Hawkins playing drums on the song "E-Ticket".

In 2021, Hawkins and Jane's Addiction members Dave Navarro and Chris Chaney formed a supergroup called NHC. Described by Hawkins as being "somewhere between Rush and the Faces", the band made its live debut in September 2021 at Eddie Vedder's Ohana festival, with Taylor's Foo Fighters bandmate Pat Smear on additional guitar. The band recorded an album in 2021, which released in 2022.

Along with the other members of Foo Fighters, Hawkins starred as himself in the comedy horror film Studio 666, released on February 25, 2022. He posthumously appears on select tracks on Ozzy Osbourne's 2022 album Patient Number 9 and Iggy Pop's 2023 album Every Loser.

== Influences ==
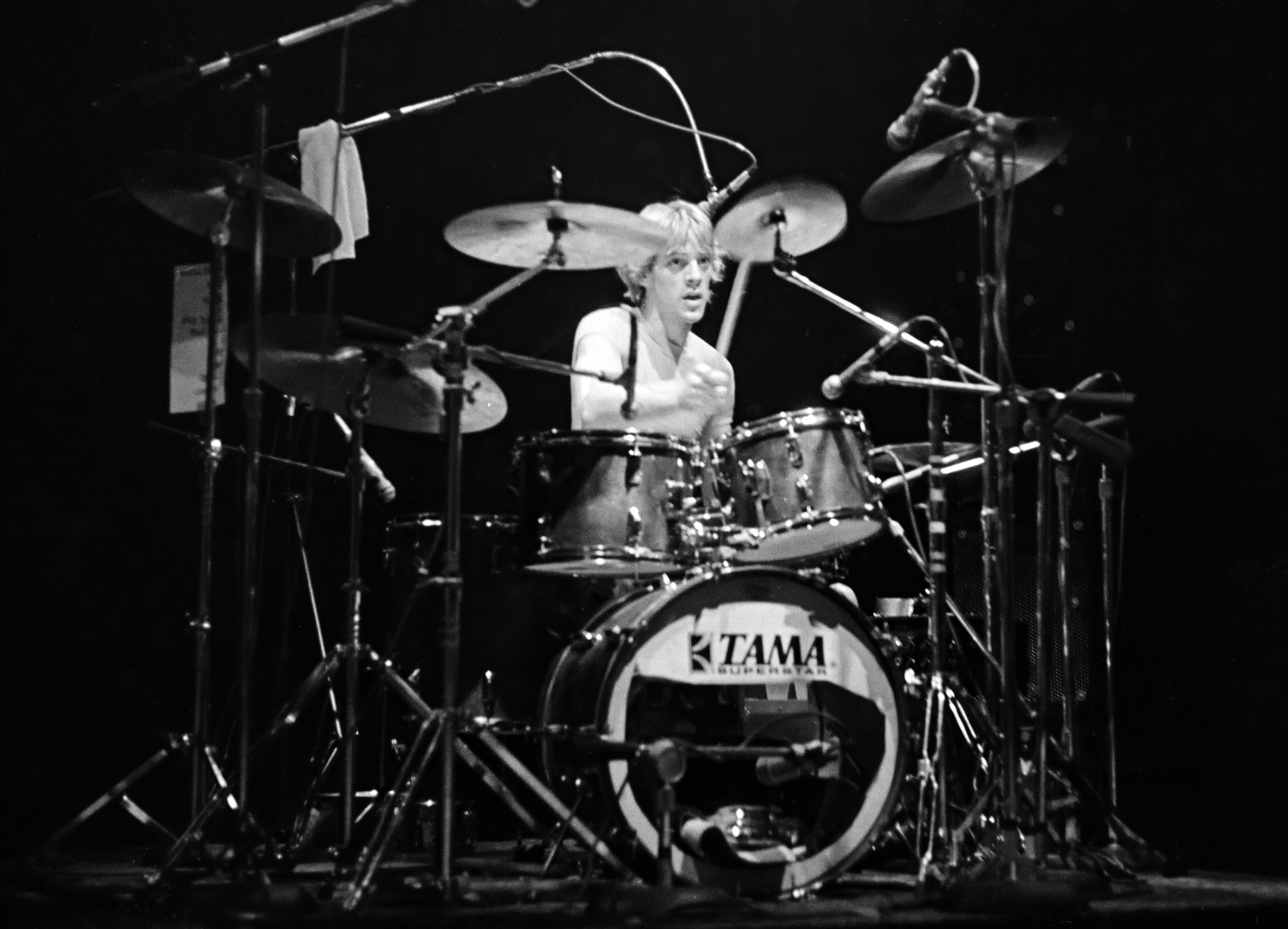
Hawkins was influenced by a multitude of different drummers, including Stewart Copeland of the Police (pictured), whom he idolized and eventually befriended.

Hawkins said that his drumming was chiefly influenced by classic rock drummers, including Phil Collins of Genesis; Stewart Copeland of the Police, whom he idolized and eventually befriended; Budgie of Siouxsie and the Banshees; Roger Taylor of Queen; Stephen Perkins of Jane's Addiction; Jim Gordon of Derek and the Dominos; Neil Peart of Rush; Alex Van Halen of Van Halen; and John Bonham from Led Zeppelin.

Hawkins was once guest editor of Rhythm and interviewed Collins, Copeland, Taylor, and Perkins for the issue.

It was thanks to Rush that I got into Genesis. After listening to Neil, I bought the Seconds Out live album, which was released in 1977. It's just amazing. Not only hearing Phil Collins playing the drums, but also singing. He gets a really bad rap from some people for 'daring' to take over after Peter Gabriel quit, but you just hear the way he sounds here. The beauty of this album is that it's got songs from ...Trick of the Tail, the first album Genesis did without Gabriel. Collins is an incredible drummer. Anyone who wants to be good on the drums should check him out – the man is a master.

Hawkins's first two major inspirations were Roger Taylor and Stewart Copeland. He reported that listening to these two drummers' different styles showed him a wide spectrum of drumming style. He also mentioned that he would play along with songs on the radio or records, like Queen's News of the World, to enhance his skills when he was young.

== Equipment ==
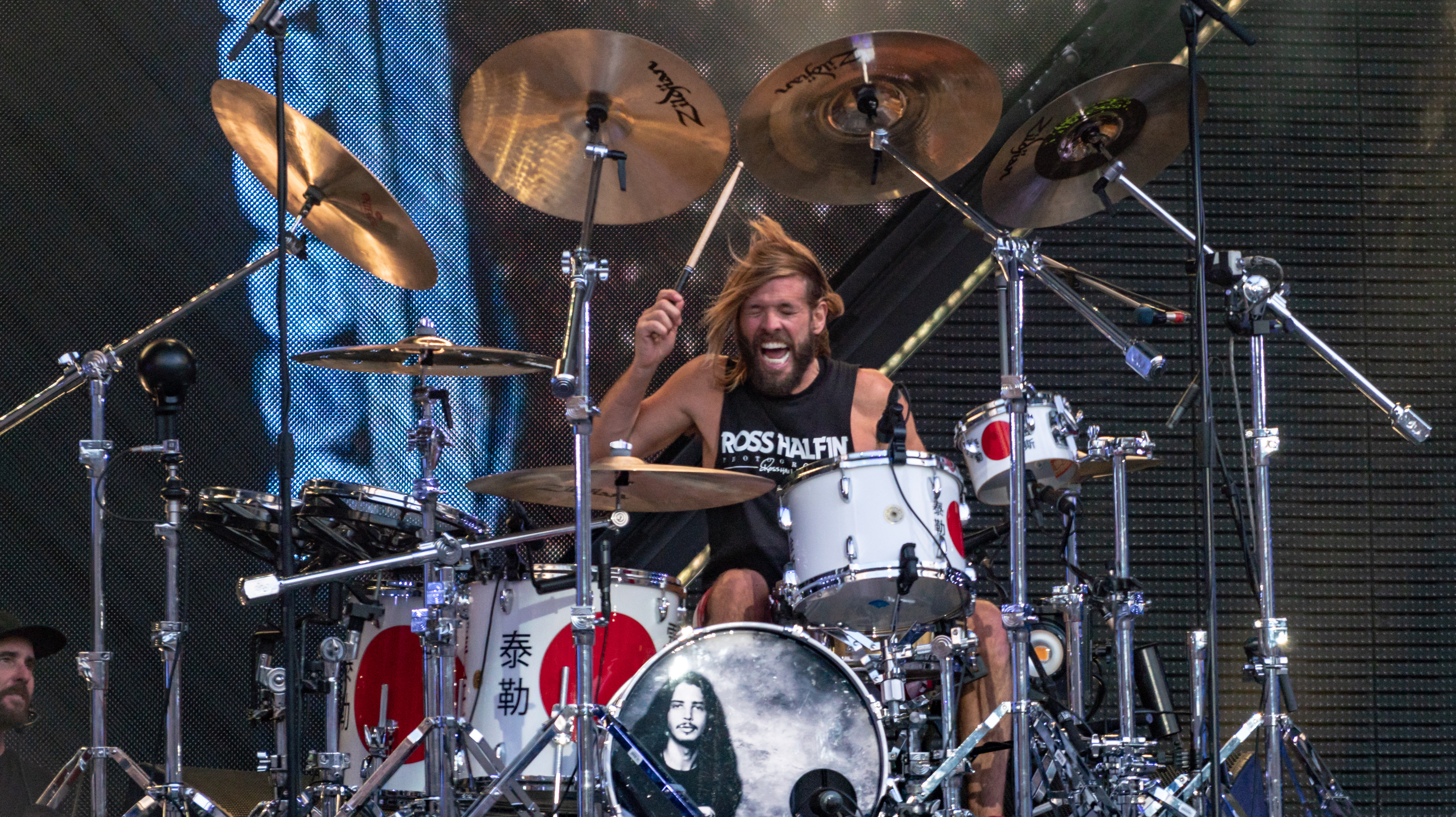
Hawkins performing in 2018

During his career, Hawkins used a variety of different brands, including Ludwig Drums, Tama Drums, and, most notably, Gretsch Drums, which he endorsed and played from 2005 until his death. He was also known to use Zildjian Cymbals.

== Personal life ==
Hawkins and his wife, Alison, married in 2005. Together they had three children, including drummer Shane Hawkins. They lived in Hidden Hills, California, after moving from nearby Topanga Canyon in 2012.

Hawkins overdosed on heroin in August 2001, which left him in a coma for two weeks. Hawkins's bandmate and best friend, Dave Grohl, was beside his hospital bed in London until he woke up. Grohl said he was ready to quit music while Hawkins was in the hospital. He also revealed in the 2011 documentary Foo Fighters: Back and Forth, that he wrote the song "On the Mend" from the band's 2005 album In Your Honor about Hawkins while the latter was in a coma. Speaking to Beats 1 host Matt Wilkinson in 2018 about the incident, Hawkins said: "I was partying a lot. I wasn't a junkie, per se, but I was partying. There was a year where the partying just got a little too heavy. Thank God on some level this guy gave me the wrong line with the wrong thing one night and I woke up going, 'What the fuck happened?' That was a real changing point for me." In the same interview, Hawkins also said he was sober.

Hawkins suffered from stage fright. Speaking about his health in a June 2021 interview with Rolling Stone magazine, Hawkins said: "I'm healthy. I'm good... I get sinus infections really bad. And I just found out from my doctor, got all my blood tests and my heart everything checked and he goes, 'Dude, you're in amazing shape. Your heart's big, because you exercise a lot. It's like a runner's heart.' And that's fine. The only thing is, he said, 'I think you have sleep apnea.' And my wife's always saying you snore and you fucking make weird noises while you're sleeping and stuff."

== Death ==
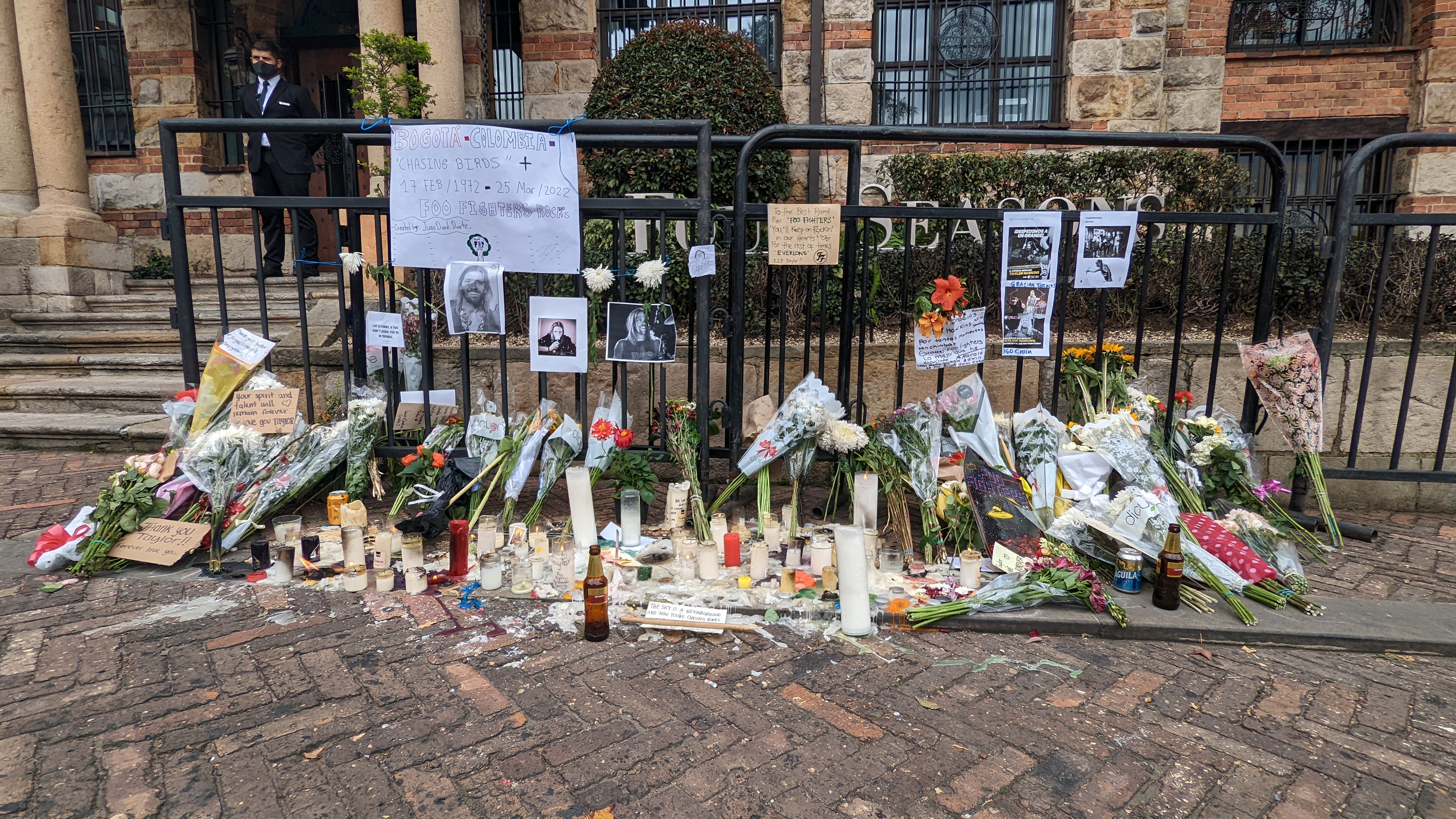
Memorial outside the Four Seasons Casa Medina hotel, Bogotá, two days after Hawkins died there

On March 25, 2022, Hawkins was in Bogotá, Colombia, where he was scheduled to perform with the Foo Fighters later that evening for the Estéreo Picnic festival. After Hawkins complained of chest pains, emergency services were called up to his room at the Four Seasons Casa Medina hotel. Health personnel arrived and found Hawkins unresponsive; they performed CPR, but he was declared dead at the scene, aged 50.

It was reported that Mötley Crüe drummer Tommy Lee was one of the last people to speak to Hawkins, just hours before his death, in a phone conversation to Hawkins's hotel room.

The following day, Colombian authorities announced that a preliminary urine toxicology test indicated that Hawkins had ten substances in his system at the time of his death, including opioids, benzodiazepines, tricyclic antidepressants, and THC.

Colombia's National Institute of Forensic Medicine stated that they would "continue the medical studies to achieve total clarification of the events that led to the death of Taylor Hawkins", and the attorney general's office would continue to investigate his cause of death in a "timely manner".

A May 2022 article from Andy Greene and Kory Grow in Rolling Stone made the case that Hawkins was suffering from extreme exhaustion in the period leading up to his death, and allegedly asked that no more dates be added to the scheduled tour. However, two of the interviewees, Chad Smith and Matt Cameron, have since disavowed the article, stating that they were quoted out of context and that their comments were misrepresented. Noting that official autopsy results had not, at that time, been made public, the Greene–Grow article went on to state that "his friends believe[d] he wasn't using hard drugs recreationally at the time of his death" and that the post-mortem forensics performed indicated that the mass of Hawkins's heart was "about double ... normal size" (indicating cardiomegaly), raising the possibility that "it could have collapsed" apart from any contribution of drugs in his system."

As of March 2026, Hawkins's cause of death had not been made public.

=== Tribute concerts ===
The Foo Fighters announced the death of Hawkins in a Twitter statement on March 25, writing that "His musical spirit and infectious laughter will live on with all of us forever." On March 29, the band canceled all their upcoming shows. On the night of his death, Hawkins was scheduled to perform with the Foo Fighters at the Estéreo Picnic Festival in Bogotá as part of their ongoing South American tour. The festival stage was turned into a candlelight vigil for Hawkins.

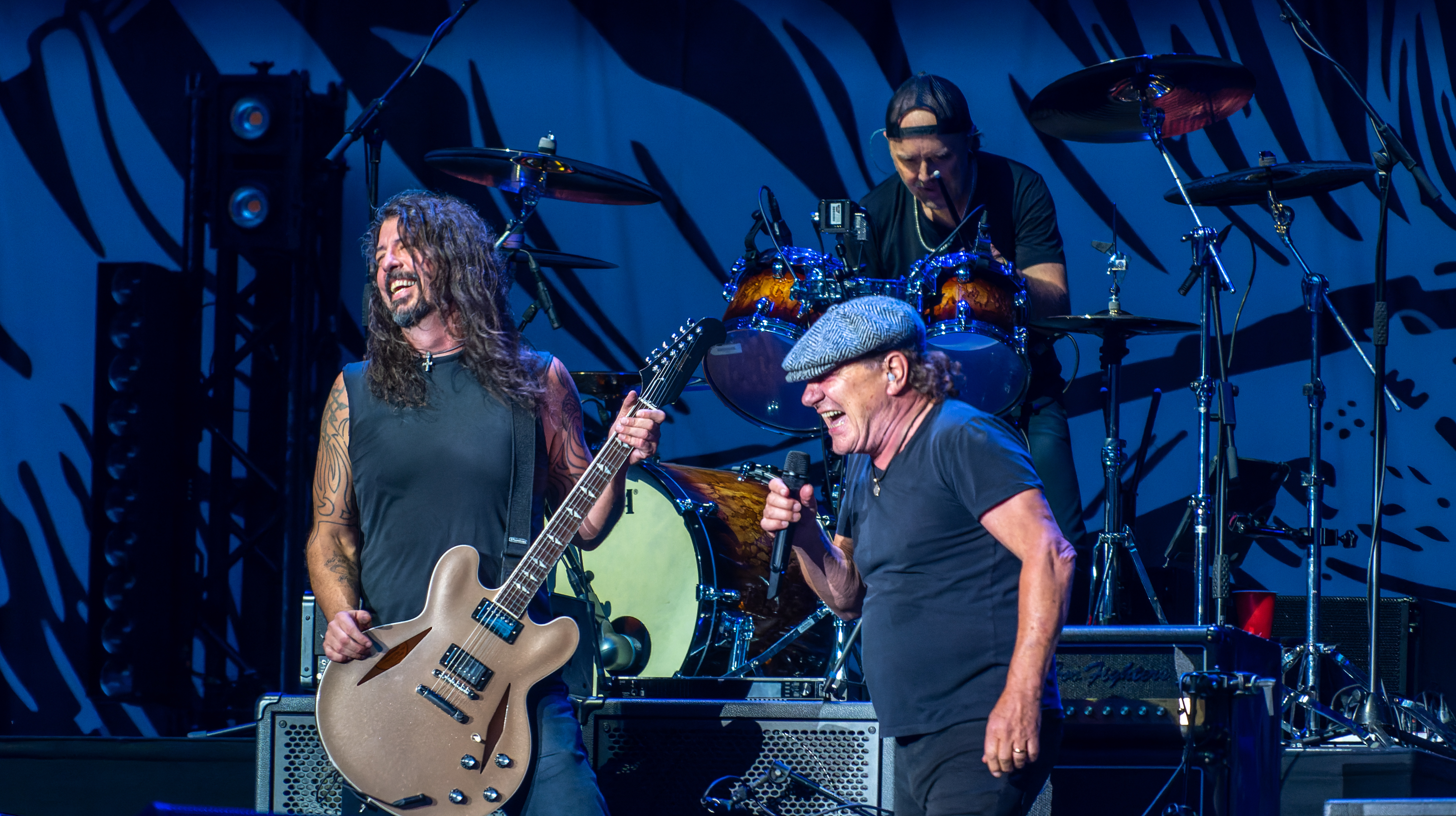
Tribute concert by surviving members of the Foo Fighters, with guest vocalist Brian Johnson from AC/DC and Lars Ulrich from Metallica on drums (September 2022)

On June 8, 2022, the Foo Fighters and the family of Hawkins announced two shows in tribute to Hawkins. The first show, played at Wembley Stadium in London, took place on September 3, 2022. The Foo Fighters were joined by Travis Barker, Nandi Bushell, Martin Chambers, Chris Chaney, Dave Chappelle, Stewart Copeland, Josh Freese, Liam Gallagher, Omar Hakim, Justin Hawkins, Joshua Homme, Chrissie Hynde, the James Gang, Alain Johannes, Brian Johnson, John Paul Jones, Greg Kurstin, Geddy Lee, Alex Lifeson, Brian May, Paul McCartney, Chris Rock, Nile Rodgers, Mark Ronson, Sam Ryder, Luke Spiller, Supergrass, Roger Taylor, Rufus Taylor, Lars Ulrich, and Wolfgang Van Halen, plus members of Hawkins's cover band, Chevy Metal. His son Oliver Shane Hawkins paid tribute to his father with the band during a performance of "My Hero" by taking on his father's role as drummer. The concert at Wembley Stadium was streamed live on YouTube and Paramount+, with a rerun being broadcast on CBS. Shane Hawkins was awarded the 'Drum Performance of the Year' at the Drumeo Awards for this performance.

The guest list reunited, in whole or in part, several of Hawkins's favorite bands, including Queen and Rush. Some had not played together for a long time, including Grohl's supergroup Them Crooked Vultures (12 years) and the James Gang (16 years).

The second tribute concert, at the Kia Forum in Inglewood, California, took place on September 27, 2022, and featured Hawkins's bandmates as well as numerous guest artists. Returning from the London show were Barker, Copeland, Hakim, Homme, Johannes, Jones, Kurstin, Lee, Lifeson, Brian May, Novoselic, Ronson, Smith, Spiller, Roger Taylor, Rufus Taylor, Ulrich, Van Halen, the James Gang, and Chevy Metal. Also appearing were Sebastian Bach, Jack Black, Geezer Butler, Matt Cameron, Danny Carey, Phil Collen, Miley Cyrus, Joe Elliott, Joan Jett, Mark King, Tommy Lee, Taylor Momsen, Alanis Morissette, Pink, Nikki Sixx, Chad Smith, Kim Thayil, Jon Theodore, Brad Wilk, Nancy Wilson, and Patrick Wilson.

== Discography ==
=== Alanis Morissette ===
- Jagged Little Pill, Live (1997)

=== Foo Fighters ===
- There Is Nothing Left to Lose (1999)
- One by One (2002)
- In Your Honor (2005)
- Echoes, Silence, Patience & Grace (2007)
- Wasting Light (2011)
- Sonic Highways (2014)
- Saint Cecilia (2015)
- Concrete and Gold (2017)
- Medicine at Midnight (2021)

=== Taylor Hawkins and the Coattail Riders ===
- Taylor Hawkins and the Coattail Riders (2006)
- Red Light Fever (2010)
- Get the Money (2019)

=== Nighttime Boogie Association ===
- Long in the Tooth/The Path We're On (Single) (2020)

=== NHC ===
- Feed the Cruel/Better Move On (Single) (2021)
- Devil That You Know/Lazy Eyes (Single) (2021)
- Intakes & Outtakes (EP) (2022)

=== The Birds of Satan ===
- The Birds of Satan (2014)

=== Coheed and Cambria ===
- Good Apollo, I'm Burning Star IV, Volume Two: No World for Tomorrow (2007)

=== Solo ===
- Taylor Hawkins (EP) (Recorded 1996; unreleased)
- Kota (EP) (2016)

=== Session appearances ===
- Another World (1998) - Brian May
- Help Wanted (2008) – Eric Avery
- Sound City: Real to Reel (2013) – with Dave Grohl
- Rush 2112: 40th Anniversary (2016) – cover of composition "Overture" (part of 2112), with Dave Grohl and Nick Raskulinecz
- Kind Heaven (2019) – Perry Farrell
- Plastic Hearts (2020) – Miley Cyrus
- The Lockdown Sessions (2021) – Elton John
- Patient Number 9 (2022) – Ozzy Osbourne (Released Posthumously)
- Every Loser (2023) – Iggy Pop w/ Eric Avery & NHC (Released Posthumously)

== Filmography ==
Year	Title	Role	Notes			
2021	Studio 666	Himself		2026	Travis Barker: Louder Than Fear	Himself
