= Taylor Hawkins and the Coattail Riders =

American rock band

Taylor Hawkins & The Coattail Riders
- Origin: United States
- Genres: Alternative rock; hard rock; pop rock
- Years active: 2004–2022
- Labels: Thrive; Shanabelle/RCA
- Past members: Taylor Hawkins; Gannin Arnold; Nate Wood; Chris Chaney; Brent Woods; John Lousteau
- Website: taylorhawkins.com

Taylor Hawkins & The Coattail Riders was an American rock band founded by Taylor Hawkins, drummer for Foo Fighters. Hawkins was the drummer and vocalist for the trio. Other band members have included Chris Chaney on bass, Gannin Arnold on guitar and backing vocals, and Nate Wood on guitar and backing vocals. Chaney and Hawkins had previously played in Alanis Morissette's tour band, Sexual Chocolate. The Coattail Riders disbanded when Hawkins died on March 25, 2022.

== History ==
The project was launched when Hawkins started recording a few songs at a home studio owned by a friend, Drew Hester. This ended up spawning a band, with Taylor Hawkins on vocals.

=== Debut album ===
On March 21, 2006, the band released their self-titled debut album. It featured eleven songs, which were recorded in 2004, before Foo Fighters started recording In Your Honor. Their first official video was of the first song off the album, "Louise".

=== Red Light Fever ===
In an interview with The Rock Radio website regarding the next album in September 2009, Taylor Hawkins stated that recording and production had been completed, but that they had yet to decide on a title or release date.

In February 2010, the album was announced. Titled Red Light Fever, it was to be released on April 19. It features guest musicians Brian May and Roger Taylor of Queen, Dave Grohl of Foo Fighters, and Elliot Easton of the Cars. It was recorded at the Foo Fighters' Studio 606 in California.

=== Get the Money ===
On November 8, 2019, the band released their third album, Get the Money. The first single, "Crossed the Line", was released on October 15, 2019, and features Dave Grohl and Yes frontman, Jon Davison. The video for the single "I Really Blew It" features Grohl and Perry Farrell.

=== Taylor Hawkins' death ===
On March 25, 2022, Hawkins died in Bogotá, Colombia, while on tour with Foo Fighters.

On September 3, 2022, the Coattail Riders performed at the Taylor Hawkins Tribute Concert at Wembley Stadium. They were joined onstage by Justin Hawkins of the Darkness as well as future Foo Fighters drummer Josh Freese.

== Discography ==
=== Studio albums ===
Title	Details	Peak chart positions
Title	Details	SCO
Taylor Hawkins & the Coattail Riders	Released: March 21, 2006; Label: Thrive; Format: LP, CD	—
Red Light Fever	Released: April 20, 2010; Label: Shanabelle, RCA; Format: LP, CD, streaming	—
Get the Money	Released: November 8, 2019; Label: RCA; Format: LP, CD, streaming	97
