= Orange Sky Laundry =

Homelessness support charity in Brisbane, Australia

- Established: 4 September 2014; Operating since 10 October 2014; 12 years ago
- Founders: Nic Marchesi; Lucas Patchett
- Founded at: Brisbane
- Registration no.: 85890622990
- Headquarters: Stafford, Brisbane, QLD Australia
- Services: Free laundry and showers for homeless people
- Website: www.orangeskylaundry.com.au

Orange Sky Laundry is a not-for-profit charity organisation based in Brisbane, Australia, that supports people experiencing homelessness or hardship through access to free laundry and shower services, as well the opportunity for regular connection. It was established in September 2014 by Nic Marchesi and Lucas Patchett, who were named Young Australians of the Year in 2016. The service has since expanded across Australia and New Zealand.

As of November 2025, Orange Sky Australia has over 60 services, located across every state and territory and including remote locations. Orange Sky New Zealand has 7 service locations across both North and South Island.

The organisation's mission is to positively connect communities, and aim to be there for those who use their services to provide consistency, reassurance and connection.

== Services as of 2025 ==
Service	Description
Free Laundry	Washer and dryers operating out of vans
Free Shower	Showers operating out of vans
Remote Facilities	Containing washing machines and dryers, remote vehicles deliver laundry service in remote Australian communities
Natural Disaster Response	Clean laundry and shower service
Women's Services	Clean laundry and connection for women and children, run by a team of all-women volunteers
Services for Families in Need	Volunteers visit those in crisis accommodation to provide laundry services
Laundromat of the Future	A paid laundromat that funds the service for those doing it tough
Indoor Laundromat Shifts	Orange Sky washer and dryers within regular laundromats, that are free of charge.
Listening Podcast	The F Word is a podcast to educate people on the heart and mission of Orange Sky

- Connection is facilitated throughout all these services through conversation with volunteers and those who attend the service.

== Background ==
Orange Sky Laundry is a government-registered charity. The laundry vans filled a service gap and not only offered clean laundry and a shower service, but connection. Co-founder Marchesi says human connection for the isolated is the most important aspect of their initiative. Each van carries six orange chairs, and while waiting for laundry to finish, the volunteers sit and socialise with the visitors.

Orange Sky Laundry was established on 4 September 2014 and began operations on 10 October 2014. Marchesi describes himself and Patchett as "two normal everyday blokes who had a crazy idea". They had previously volunteered at food vans and other outreach programs while still at school, and had a passion to help the homeless. Their idea "started as a fun test project — to see if it would work. From there, it took a life of its own.” They took the name for their service from the Alexi Murdoch song "Orange Sky", which is about lending a hand to those in need.

In February 2015, five months after they started with the first van in Brisbane in October 2014, and two weeks after their expansion into Cairns, Cyclone Marcia hit the central Queensland coast and the then 20-year-olds headed to the area to offer their free service to affected communities. Similarly, in January 2016, they travelled to Victoria to provide laundry services to people affected by the Great Ocean Road bushfires.

== Laundry and shower expansion timeline ==
Orange Sky began operating its second van (in Cairns) by February 2015, and its third in Melbourne in June. Their first birthday, and World Homeless Day 2015, were celebrated with a new service in south east Victoria, funded by partners The Good Guys (who provided half of the funding for the van), the Jelley Family Foundation, and the Bennelong Foundation.

Other vans began operating in Sydney in November 2015, Gold Coast in January 2016, Perth in February 2016, Adelaide in March 2016, Sunshine Coast in April 2016, Canberra in April 2016, and Hobart in July 2016. By July 2016, Orange Sky had 10 vans and 4,000 volunteers, and were estimated to be washing nearly six tonnes of laundry each week.

On 23 August 2016, Orange Sky launched a new mobile service: free hot showers for the homeless. One of the first people to try the shower vans described it as "bloody awesome".

In October of 2021, Laundromat of the Future in Toowoomba was launched. Orange Sky partnered with a laundromat business to run laundry services out of their location, allowing larger quantities of washing to be carried out in a more efficient way. In December of the same year, the first Social Impact Laundromat was launched in Adelaide. Operating like a regular laundromat, funds from each wash create a positive impact by supporting those experiencing homelessness.

In 2023, Orange Sky’s Women Only Services launched. These shifts are focused on supporting women with access to free laundry services and positive connection. Just like regular Orange Sky services, they operate alongside another service provider with the aim of providing holistic support to those who need it.

== Remote Australian Communities ==
Since 2018 Orange Sky has extended its reach into remote Indigenous communities across Australia. Their focus is on creating purposeful partnerships, where their service is tailored to the needs of the local community – whether that’s a mobile laundry truck or a stationary pod located at a partnering organisation. Regardless of the asset, the service is always run by the local community, for the community. As of November 2025, Orange Sky Australia operates in 19 remote locations, across Queensland, Northern Territory, and Western Australia.

=== Reconciliation ===
"Orange Sky envisions an Australia where reconciliation is evident in the equitable health and social outcomes of Aboriginal and Torres Strait Islander peoples. We envisage an Australian society that celebrates First Nations culture and acknowledges our shared history. Orange Sky recognises that to drive this change, we must listen to, learn from and lean in to support the actions of Aboriginal and Torres Strait Islander peoples. Orange Sky is strengthened by the voices and perspectives of our Aboriginal and Torres Strait Islander friends, remote residents, staff, volunteers, partners and supporters."

- Lucas Patchett, Co-Founder and CEO of Orange Sky

== Awards ==
On Australia Day 2016, the two co-founders were awarded joint Young Australians of the Year for their social entrepreneurship. In their acceptance speeches after being announced as winners by the Australian prime minister, Malcolm Turnbull, Patchett said "we can restore respect, raise health standards and be a catalyst for conversation". Marchesi continued "It's so crazy and humbling to think such a simple idea has had such a significant impact".

In June 2016 they were invited to Frankfurt, Germany to receive a Global Best Practices Award: Special Award for Corporate Social Responsibility.

In October 2018, Orange Sky was given the People's Choice Award in the Google Impact Challenge Australia.

In November of 2025, Orange Sky co-founder and CEO, Lucas Patchett, was shortlisted for Not-for-Profit Executive of the Year at The CEO Magazine Executive of the Year Awards.

== See also ==
- Homelessness in Australia
