= The Panic Channel =

American band (2004–2007)

- Origin: Los Angeles, California, USA
- Genres: Alternative rock, post-hardcore
- Years active: 2004–2007
- Label: Capitol
- Spinoff of: Jane's Addiction
- Past members: Steve Isaacs; Dave Navarro; Stephen Perkins; Chris Chaney; Siggy Sjursen

The Panic Channel was an American post-hardcore band formed in Los Angeles, California, United States, in 2004, following the third break-up of Jane's Addiction. The band consisted of vocalist Steve Isaacs formerly of Skycycle and three Jane's Addiction members: Dave Navarro (guitar), Chris Chaney (bass), and Stephen Perkins (drums, percussion). The band released one studio album, entitled (ONe) in 2006, and entered an indefinite hiatus in 2007.

== Biography ==
Formed in the wake of Jane's Addiction's third split in early 2004, The Panic Channel featured guitarist Dave Navarro, bassist Chris Chaney, and drummer Stephen Perkins, all formerly of Jane's Addiction, as well as vocalist Steve Isaacs, formerly of the band Skycycle. The band's name refers to a state of panic induced by the world media as well as "channeling the energy inside and outside the room when we create these songs. We like to think of creating music as a way to channel the panic into something tangible," as stated by Navarro.

The band's sole album, (ONe), was released on August 15, 2006, via Capitol Records. According to the band's official website, the album's name refers to numerous aspects of the band: the debut album for the band (the first, or album number "one"), the Panic "Channel" being "ON", and there being "nothing more than ONE, spiritually speaking." Also according to the website, the parentheses represents everything being held together in "this age of panic." Currently, the band has released two singles – one radio single, "Why Cry", and one internet single, "Teahouse of the Spirits". Both of these songs, as well as "She Won't Last" and "Bloody Mary", can be heard on the band's MySpace page. The song "Teahouse of the Spirits" also appears on Madden NFL 07.

On September 6, 2006, on CBS's Rock Star: Supernova, it was announced the band would join Supernova on a 28-city tour.

In January 2007, it was announced that Siggy Sjursen of Powerman 5000 would be joining The Panic Channel as a touring bassist, replacing Chris Chaney who was said to be unable to tour due to family obligations. Initially, Chaney was said to still be a member of the band, but Sjursen was later announced as a permanent replacement.

Dave Navarro and Stephen Perkins reunited with Jane's Addiction in 2008. However, on his radio show "Dark Matter" on 6 August 2009, Navarro said he had spoken to both Perkins and Chaney about re-forming The Panic Channel, with Steve Isaacs' residence in New York City being the main problem. He has meanwhile moved back to Los Angeles. Navarro urged fans to go on to Twitter to send Isaacs messages encouraging him to re-unite with the band.

== Band members ==
- Steve Isaacs – lead vocals, rhythm guitar (2004–2007)
- Dave Navarro – lead guitar (2004–2007)
- Stephen Perkins – drums (2004–2007)
- Chris Chaney - bass (2004–2007)
- Siggy Sjursen – bass (2007)

Personnel:

- Marc VanGool – guitar,studio technician

== Discography ==
Date of release	Title	Label	U.S. album-chart position	U.S. sales	UK album-chart position	UK sales
August 15, 2006	(ONe)	Capitol Records	110	10,000	N/A	N/A

=== Singles ===
Year	Song	US Hot 100	U.S. Modern Rock	U.S. Mainstream Rock	Album
2006	"Why Cry"	-	33	39	ONe
