= One (The Panic Channel album) =

Studio album by the Panic Channel
- Released: August 15, 2006
- Recorded: 2005–2006
- Genre: Alternative rock, post-hardcore
- Length: 53:06
- Label: Capitol
- Producer: Josh Abraham, Ryan Williams (additional production), Howard Benson (produced "Why Cry" and "Blue Bruises"), Brian Virtue (produced "Left to Lose")

Professional ratings
Aggregate scores
Source	Rating
Metacritic	39/100
Review scores
Source	Rating
AllMusic	2/5 stars
Alternative Press	2/5 stars
Blender	1.5/5 stars
Drowned in Sound	3/10
Entertainment Weekly	C
Mojo	1/5 stars
musicOMH	2/5 stars
NME	4/10
Rolling Stone	1.5/5 stars
Uncut	4/10

One is the debut and sole album released by the supergroup the Panic Channel, who formed in 2004, released via Capitol Records in the US on August 15, 2006, and to the rest of the world on September 4, 2006. There were two singles released: "Why Cry" and "Teahouse of the Spirits".

== Track listing ==
1. "Teahouse of the Spirits" (Steve Isaacs/Dave Navarro/Stephen Perkins/Chris Chaney) – 3:18
2. "Left to Lose" (Isaacs/Navarro/Perkins/Chaney) – 3:55
3. "Bloody Mary" (Isaacs/Navarro/Perkins/Chaney) – 4:07
4. "Why Cry" (Isaacs/Benson) – 3:24
5. "Awake" (Isaacs/Navarro/Perkins/Chaney) – 3:48
6. "She Won't Last" (Isaacs/Navarro/Perkins/Chaney) – 4:46
7. "Said You'd Be" (Isaacs/Navarro/Perkins/Chaney) – 2:34
8. "Outsider" (Isaacs/Navarro/Perkins/Chaney) – 4:45
9. "Blue Bruises" (Isaacs) – 3:56
10. "Night One (from Planchette)" (Isaacs/Navarro) – 7:58
11. "Listen" (Isaacs) – 5:30
12. "Lie Next to Me" (Isaacs) – 3:44
13. "Untitled" – 1:21
14. "Loop Hole (Apple Music Bonus Track)" – 4:49

== Personnel ==
- Dave Navarro – lead guitar, backing vocals
- Steve Isaacs – lead vocals, rhythm guitar, logo design
- Chris Chaney – bass guitar
- Stephen Perkins – drums
- Josh Abraham – producer
- Ted Jensen – mastering
- Ron Laffitte – A&R
- Chris Lord-Alge – mixing
- Jimmy Turrell – art direction
- Brian Virtue – producer, engineer
- Ryan Williams – producer, engineer, mixing

== Charts ==
Chart performance
Chart (2006)	Peak position
Canadian Albums (Nielsen SoundScan)	58
US Billboard 200	110
US Heatseekers Albums (Billboard)	1
