= One California Day =

One California Day is a 2007 documentary film about surfing shot in six coastal regions in California. Directed by Mark Jeremias and Jason Baffa, the film looks at the experience of California surfing from Crescent City to Imperial Beach. The film was shot in super 16mm color film.

== Surfers featured ==
(In alphabetical order)

- Lance Carson
- Joe Curren
- Jimmy Gamboa
- Tyler Hatzikian
- Devon Howard
- Alex Knost
- Chris, Dan and Keith Malloy
- Dane Perlee
- Joel Tudor
- Tyler Warren
