= Scooby-Doo on Zombie Island =

1998 American animated film

- Promotional poster
- Directed by: Jim Stenstrum
- Screenplay by: Glenn Leopold
- Story by: Glenn Leopold; Davis Doi
- Based on: Characters by Hanna-Barbera Productions
- Produced by: Cos Anzilotti
- Starring: Billy West; Scott Innes; Mary Kay Bergman; Frank Welker; B. J. Ward; Adrienne Barbeau; Cam Clarke; Tara Charendoff; Jim Cummings; Mark Hamill
- Edited by: Paul Douglas
- Music by: Steven Bramson
- Production companies: Hanna-Barbera Cartoons; Warner Bros. Animation; Warner Bros. Family Entertainment
- Distributed by: Warner Home Video
- Release date: September 22, 1998
- Running time: 77 minutes
- Country: United States
- Language: English

Scooby-Doo on Zombie Island is a 1998 American direct-to-video animated mystery comedy horror film based on the Scooby-Doo franchise. In the film, Shaggy, Scooby, Fred, Velma and Daphne reunite after a year-long hiatus from Mystery, Inc. to investigate a bayou island said to be haunted by the ghost of the pirate Morgan Moonscar. The film was directed by Jim Stenstrum and written by Glenn Leopold, based on a story by Leopold and Davis Doi.

Scooby-Doo's popularity had grown in the 1990s due to reruns aired on Cartoon Network. The channel's parent company, Time Warner, suggested developing a direct-to-video (DTV) film on the property. The team at Hanna-Barbera, collaborating with Warner Bros. Animation (which was in the process of absorbing Hanna-Barbera at the time), consisted of many veteran artists and writers. Many of the original voice actors of the series were replaced for the film, although Frank Welker returned to voice Fred Jones. It was also the first of four Scooby-Doo direct-to-video films to be animated overseas by Japanese animation studio Mook Animation. Rock bands Third Eye Blind and Skycycle contribute to the film's soundtrack. The film is dedicated to Don Messick, Scooby-Doo's original voice actor who died in October 1997.

Zombie Island contains a darker tone than most Scooby-Doo productions, and is notable for containing real supernatural creatures rather than people in costumes. The film was released on September 22, 1998, and is the first Scooby-Doo production featuring the entire adult gang (sans Scrappy-Doo) since The New Scooby-Doo Mysteries episode "A Halloween Hassle at Dracula's Castle", which premiered on ABC on October 27, 1984. The film was aided by a $50 million promotional campaign, and sponsorship deals with multiple companies. Sales of the film on VHS were high, and it became the first in a long-running series of DTV Scooby-Doo films. The film made its TV debut on October 31, 1998, on Cartoon Network.

A sequel, Scooby-Doo! and the Witch's Ghost, was released in 1999, while two decades after the film's release, Warner Bros. Animation developed a stand-alone sequel titled Return to Zombie Island, released in 2019.

== Plot ==
Mystery, Inc. go their separate ways after becoming bored of mystery-solving due to their monstrous culprits always being people in costumes. Daphne Blake, along with Fred Jones, becomes the star of a successful reality television series, determined to hunt down a real ghost rather than a fake one. Sometime later, Fred contacts Velma Dinkley, Shaggy Rogers and his dog Scooby-Doo to reunite for Daphne's birthday. The gang then embark on a road trip scouting haunted locations across the U.S. for Daphne's show, only to encounter more fake monsters.

After arriving in New Orleans, Louisiana, the gang are invited by a woman named Lena Dupree to visit her workplace at Moonscar Island, an island allegedly haunted by the ghost of its pirate namesake, Morgan Moonscar. Though they are skeptical, the gang agrees. On the island, they meet ferryman Jacques, Lena's employer Simone Lenoir, who lives in a large mansion on a pepper plantation, Simone's gardener Beau, and resident fisherman, Snakebite Scruggs. Shaggy and Scooby then encounter Moonscar's ghost, who later becomes a zombie, while the gang receives several ghostly warnings to leave. Despite this, they stay overnight, still skeptical.

That night, Shaggy and Scooby are chased by a horde of zombies. Velma suspects Beau, while Fred and Daphne capture a zombie. Fred believes it is a human culprit until he pulls its head off, revealing that the zombies are real. As the horde chases them, the gang gets separated and Daphne accidentally causes Fred to drop his video camera in quicksand, losing all film evidence for their show. In a cave, Shaggy and Scooby discover wax voodoo dolls resembling Fred, Velma, and Daphne and play with them, unknowingly controlling their friends until the pair disturb a nest of bats.

The rest of the gang and Beau then discover a secret passageway in the house, where Lena claims the zombies dragged Simone away. The passageway leads to a secret chamber for voodoo rituals, where Velma confronts Lena about her lie, having seen Simone's footprints instead of drag marks. After trapping the gang with the voodoo dolls, Simone and Lena reveal themselves and Jacques as werecats. Simone explains that 200 years ago, she and Lena were part of a group of settlers on the island who worshiped a cat god. When Moonscar and his crew invaded the island, they chased the settlers into the bayou, where they were eaten alive by alligators, but Simone and Lena escaped. They prayed to their god to curse Moonscar and were transformed into immortal werecats. They killed the pirates, but later realized that invoking their god's power had also cursed them. Every harvest moon since, the two have lured and exploited victims to drain their lives and preserve their immortality, hiring Jacques along the way to facilitate their plot in exchange for making him immortal, with the zombies and ghosts being their previous victims who awaken every harvest moon to try and scare people away, in the hopes of preventing them from suffering the same fate.

While being chased by Jacques, Shaggy and Scooby disrupt the werecats' draining ceremony, allowing the gang to free themselves. The werecats then surround the gang, but realize too late that the harvest moon has passed, causing them to disintegrate to dust and finally put the zombies' souls to rest. Beau then reveals himself as an undercover police officer who was sent to investigate disappearances on the island. Daphne asks Beau to guest star on her show, before everyone leaves the next morning.

== Voice cast ==
- Mary Kay Bergman as Daphne Blake, a member of Mystery Inc. who hosts her show called Coast to Coast with Daphne Blake.
- Frank Welker as Fred Jones, the de facto leader of Mystery Inc. who works on Daphne Blake's show as her cameraman; Welker also voices Simone Lenoir's cats, the owl, and one of the zombies.
- Billy West as Shaggy Rogers, a member of Mystery Inc. who is Scooby-Doo's owner and works as a U.S. Customs agent; West also voices Pierre.
- B. J. Ward as Velma Dinkley, the second-in-command of Mystery Inc. who owns a bookshop.
- Scott Innes as Scooby-Doo, a talking Great Dane who is Mystery Inc.'s Mascot who works as a U.S. Customs dog.
- Adrienne Barbeau as Simone Lenoir, the leader of the werecats.
- Tara Charendoff as Lena Dupree, a werecat who lured Mystery Inc. to the island.
- Cam Clarke as Detective Beau Neville, a police detective who was sent to Moonscar Island undercover as a gardener to investigate the disappearance of its visitors.
- Jim Cummings as Jacques, a werecat who serves as Simone and Lena's ferry driver; Cummings also voices Colonel Jackson T. Pettigrew, Morgan Moonscar and the plantationer in a flashback.
- Mark Hamill as Snakebite Scruggs, a hostile resident on Moonscar Island who attempts to catch a catfish called Big Mona; Hamill also voices the airport manager for whom Shaggy and Scooby work before Mystery Inc. gets back together.
- Jennifer Leigh Warren as Chris, a hostess on Daphne's show.
- Ed Gilbert as Mr. Beeman, a real estate agent who is unmasked as the Moat Monster at the beginning of the film. This was Gilbert's final film role before his death in May 1999.

== Production ==
=== Origins and story ===
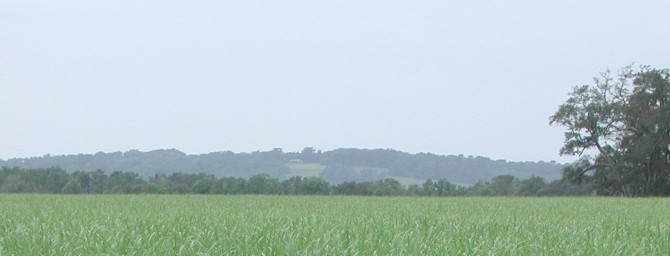
Avery Island was used as geological inspiration for the fictional Moonscar Island as featured in the film

The Scooby-Doo franchise, which by the time of this film's release was nearing its 30-year mark, had entered into a period of diminishing returns in the early 1990s. After the conclusion of the sixth iteration of the series, A Pup Named Scooby-Doo, the character became absent from Saturday-morning lineups. In 1991, Turner Broadcasting System purchased Hanna-Barbera, the animation studio behind Scooby, largely to fill programming at a new, 24/7 cable channel centered on animated properties: Cartoon Network. The advent of cable gave the franchise renewed popularity: rapidly, Scooby reruns attracted top ratings. Zombie Island was not the first attempt at a feature-length Scooby adventure; several television films were produced in the late 1980s starring the character, such as Scooby-Doo and the Ghoul School. In 1996, Turner merged with Time Warner. Davis Doi, in charge at Hanna-Barbera, was tasked with developing projects based on the studio's existing properties. Warner executives suggested Scooby, given that the property held a high Q Score, and proposed it could be a direct-to-video feature film.

The team assembled to work on the production were veterans of the animation business, and had most recently worked on SWAT Kats: The Radical Squadron and The Real Adventures of Jonny Quest. Screenwriter Glenn Leopold had been with the franchise since 1979's Scooby-Doo and Scrappy-Doo. The film was directed by Jim Stenstrum, who had worked on Scooby projects beginning in 1983's The New Scooby and Scrappy-Doo Show. As the film was considered a one-off experiment by studio brass, the crew worked with little oversight and complete creative freedom. Doi and Leopold developed the film's story, with Leopold receiving sole credit for the screenplay. Most of the script is recycled from Leopold's script for the unfinished SWAT Kats episode "The Curse of Kataluna". Stenstrum and Doi suggested in early story meetings that the monsters in the film be real (previous Scooby outings were nearly always "bad guys" in rubber masks), feeling it worked for a half-hour television episode, but might grow tiresome over a feature-length film. Leopold disagreed, noting that throughout the franchise's history, it always remained a simple, solvable mystery. Lance Falk, who worked as model coordinator on the film, suggested they combine both ideas.

=== Casting ===
Casey Kasem was originally set to reprise his role as Shaggy, but Kasem, a vegetarian, had refused to voice Shaggy in a 1995 Burger King commercial and went on to demand that Shaggy also give up eating meat in future productions. The creative team rejected this, as eating anything was a hallmark of the character. Additionally, production on Zombie Island had already begun, with the film featuring a scene with Shaggy eating crawfish. Shaggy was then recast with voice actor Billy West. Kasem was given a last-minute opportunity to fill the role and redub over West, but he made yet another refusal. Radio personality Scott Innes voiced Scooby-Doo, as Don Messick, the character's original voice actor, retired in 1996 and died in 1997; Zombie Island was subsequently dedicated to his memory. Heather North was also set to reprise her role as Daphne, but after a day of recording, Mary Kay Bergman replaced her, while B. J. Ward, who played Velma in a Johnny Bravo crossover episode, reprised her role for this film.

Frank Welker is the only actor from the original series to reprise his role, as Fred Jones. Welker had initially worried that the producers would replace him as well, given that the producers believed his voice had gone down an octave; the voice director kept requesting Welker perform the voice at a higher pitch. Welker insisted his voice was the same, as Fred's voice is very close to Welker's natural speaking voice. The team went back and viewed early Scooby-Doo episodes and found that Welker's impression was more or less the same. Bob Miller, of Animation World Network, suggested that the reruns of Scooby-Doo aired on Cartoon Network perhaps gave the team a false idea of the character's voice, as the episodes were typically time-compressed (or sped-up) to allow more room for commercials, thus giving all of the show's audio a higher pitch.

=== Animation ===
Japanese animation studio Mook Animation were contracted to work on the film; Doi had a relationship with the team at Mook, as they had previously collaborated on SWAT Kats and Jonny Quest. Hiroshi Aoyama and Kazumi Fukushima directed the overseas animation, but are not credited on the picture. The film was animated and is presented in standard 1.33:1 full frame format. The team were allowed more time to work on the film, as there was no real set schedule—just delivery to the home video department upon completion. The American crew re-designed the series cast for the film, giving them a fashion update. The team felt Fred and Daphne, with their ascots and Fred's bell-bottoms, felt very dated to the '60s (although the original designs were used in the opening scene). Fred wore a pair of jeans, a baby blue dress shirt, and a khaki vest. Daphne is seen wearing a suit, consisting of a purple skirt and purple suit jacket, her undershirt is green in accordance to her original color scheme, her headband is removed as well. The team also briefly changed Shaggy's shirt color to red and gave him sneakers, though they quickly relented, as they viewed his original outfit as more timeless. Velma was also given very few changes, although her pleated skirt was replaced with a regular red skirt, her knee high socks are now rolled to the ankles and her shoes are sneakers, not the '60s styled Mary-Janes from her original design. Velma still sported an orange turtle neck sweater, and her color scheme was unchanged. The entire gang is seen in their original 1960s attire in the opening scene.

The group were trusted by the studio's management as they had worked together for a long time, and all involved on the film had a real passion for the project. Drew Gentle was the main background designer for the project, with Falk contributing to the film's color key. Occasionally, the crew would hire freelance artists to contribute to ancillary designs. In addition, the group enlisted the assistance of Iwao Takamoto, the original designer of Scooby-Doo, still on salary at Hanna-Barbera, for advising on scenes. Takamoto called the film "a good solid mystery", and storyboarded several sequences of interplay between Shaggy and Scooby.

=== Music ===
Composer Steven Bramson, who is known for Tiny Toon Adventures, JAG and the Lost in Space film, scored and conducted the film. The soundtrack for the film features three songs composed specifically for the film. "The Ghost Is Here" and "It's Terror Time Again", both written by Glenn Leopold, were performed by Skycycle. The title track, "Scooby-Doo, Where Are You!", was performed by Third Eye Blind.

All lyrics are written by Glenn Leopold; all music is composed by Tom Snow, except track 1 written by David Mook and Ben Raleigh.

No.	Title	Performer(s)	Length
1.	"Scooby-Doo, Where Are You!"	Third Eye Blind	1:03
2.	"The Ghost Is Here"	Skycycle	2:21
3.	"It's Terror Time Again"	Skycycle	2:42
Total length:			6:06

== Release ==
Originally, the film was planned to be released theatrically, but when Warner Bros. noticed the strong market on home media, particularly their successful direct-to-video animated Batman films, it was later decided to release the film on VHS on September 22, 1998, through Warner Home Video. Because of the cost of production, the tape retailed at $19.95, which was noticeably higher than other direct-to-video titles of that era. Sales for the film exceeded the studio's expectations, according to a 1999 Billboard article. The film was later released on DVD on March 6, 2001, and later re-released in 2008 as a double-feature on DVD alongside the third direct-to-video Scooby film, Scooby-Doo and the Alien Invaders (2000). In 2024, the film was released on Blu-ray for the first time through the Warner Archive Collection, packaged with the standalone sequel, Scooby Doo! Return to Zombie Island. In 2025, a collector's edition was released on Blu-ray from AV Entertainment, through their deal with Warner Bros. Discovery Home Entertainment. The Blu-ray includes a behind-the-scenes booklet and an audio commentary track.

The film was aided by a reportedly $50 million promotional push, as advertisers believed the character's iconic nature would generate strong sales, and deserved "equal visibility to a theatrical release." Tie-ins included the Campbell Soup Company, SpaghettiOs, 1-800-COLLECT, Wendy's, Lego, and Cartoon Network, who debuted the film on television on October 31, 1998, after a month themed after the series. It was also promoted as part of the network's "Wacky Racing" sponsorship deal with Melling Racing in 1998, as the third of four paint schemes featured on the NASCAR Winston Cup Series #9 Ford Taurus driven by then-rookie Jerry Nadeau. The paint scheme debuted at Richmond International Raceway in the Exide NASCAR Select Batteries 400 on September 12, 1998, and was featured on the car through the Dura Lube Kmart 500 at Phoenix International Raceway on October 25, 1998, for a total of seven races out of the thirty-three race schedule. The promotional push was, at the time, the biggest marketing support in Warner Bros. Family Entertainment's history.

== Reception ==
On Rotten Tomatoes, the film holds an approval rating of 89% based on nine reviews, with an average taking of 8/10. Donald Liebenson of the Chicago Tribune described the film as "ambitious" and calls it "a nostalgic hoot [that] resurrects all the touchstones of the original cartoons." Entertainment Weekly's Joe Neumaier praised the film as "Fast, fun, and filled with knowing winks, the mystery honors the show’s beloved structure, but writ large." A 1998 New York Times article by Peter M. Nichols complimented the film as "well-made." Lynne Heffley at the Los Angeles Times called the film "more entertaining than you'd expect, despite the familiar Saturday morning-type animation."

Michael Mallory at the Los Angeles Times credited it and its subsequent features for "[spinning] the characters into more modern treatments of action and horror, and toyed with [a] self-spoofing quality." Mariana Delgado of Collider writes "a notable shift in tone and aesthetic departs from its source material [...] It's how the film injects the situation with enough realism to seem like a live-action horror film while still staying true to the animation." A 2022 Variety ranking placed Zombie Island as the best Scooby offering, with Carson Burton claiming "The film is at once extremely rooted in the classics yet willing to do something never seen before [...] The greatest of them all, Scooby-Doo on Zombie Island gets everything right."

== Sequel ==
A standalone sequel, titled Scooby-Doo! Return to Zombie Island, had its world premiere at San Diego Comic-Con on July 21, 2019, followed by a digital release on September 3, 2019, and a DVD release on October 1, 2019.
