= Orange Sky (song) =

Song by Alexi Murdoch

from the EP Four Songs
- Released: 2002
- Recorded: 2001–2002
- Genre: Folk music
- Length: 6:19
- Label: Alexi Murdoch Music
- Composer: Alexi Murdoch
- Producers: Alexi Murdoch, Chad Fischer

"Orange Sky" is a folksong from Alexi Murdoch's extended play (EP) Four Songs. The song was featured in television, movies and in an Emmy Award winning television commercial. A re-recorded version of the song is also included on Murdoch's first LP Time Without Consequence.

== History ==
"Orange Sky" is a folk song that was written by Alexi Murdoch and released in 2002. It appeared on Murdoch's extended play titled Four Songs. A Kansas City distributor, Harvest Media Group, signed Murdoch based on the strength of the EP. Before there was a formal distributor, the EP sold 15,000 copies.

Murdoch's first full-length album was titled Time Without Consequence, and the song was rerecorded and included on the record. The version he recorded for the LP record was noticeably different than the EP version. In the LP version there are more drums and a piano.

The song was featured on episodes of the television show, Dawson's Creek and The O.C.. It was also used in episodes of the television shows House and Prison Break. The song was also in the movie Garden State. It was featured in a Honda commercial. The song received more attention than the other songs on the EP and was played by several influential radio stations like WXPN in Philadelphia. The song was also featured in a Hallmark Cards commercial that won an Emmy Award.

Orange Sky Laundry, a service offering free clothes washing for the homeless in Australia, was named for the song.

== Reception ==
The Philadelphia Inquirer reviewed the EP and said that "Orange Sky" is sung in a "near whisper." Writing for the Hartford Courant, Erica B. Danton called it a "ghostly ballad." A soundtrack for The O.C. television show was released, and it featured "Orange Sky." The album's reviewer said the song was lethargic and monotonous.

== Personnel ==
=== Four Songs ===
- Alexi Murdoch – vocals, guitar, slide guitar
- Chad Fischer – drums
- Andrew Bush – bass
- Jay Bellerose – cymbal
- Joel Shearer – electric guitar
- Renee Stahl – backing vocals

=== Time Without Consequence ===
- Alexi Murdoch – harmonium, guitar, piano, tambourine
- Brett Simons – bass
- Greg Leisz – guitar
- Joel Shearer – guitar
- Jay Bellerose – percussion
- Ben Peeler – lap steel guitar
- Savanna Talbot – backing vocals
