= Alexi Murdoch =

English musician and songwriter (born 1973)

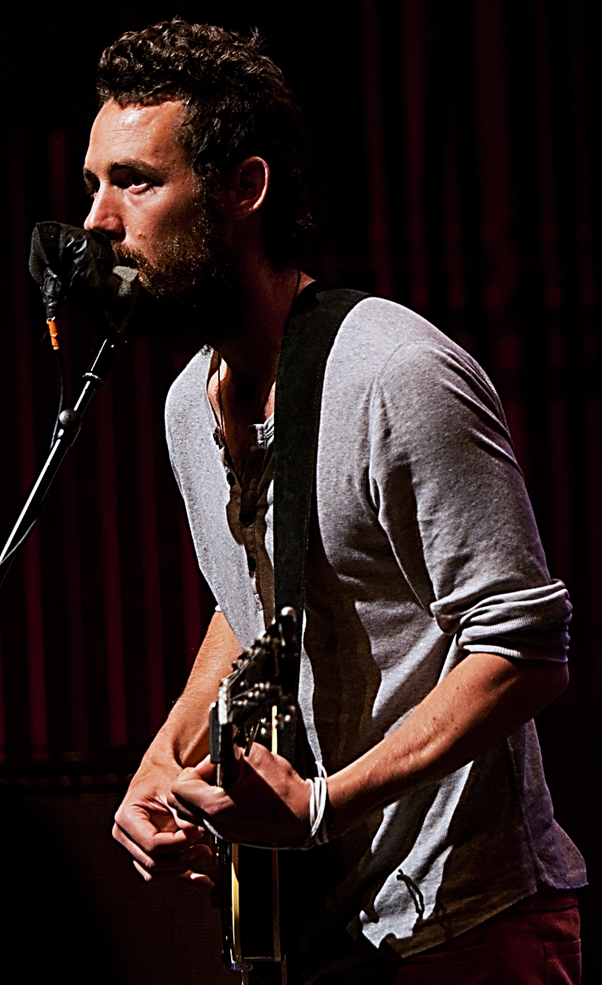
- Murdoch at PopTech 2012 in Reykjavik, Iceland

Background information
- Born: 27 December 1973 (age 52); London, England
- Genres: Folk
- Occupations: Singer-songwriter; multi-instrumentalist
- Instruments: Vocals; piano; guitar; keyboards; drums; bass guitar
- Years active: 2002–present
- Labels: Zero Summer Records, City Slang
- Website: aleximurdoch.com

Alexi Murdoch (born 27 December 1973) is an English folk musician and songwriter. Since his debut in 2002, Murdoch has released two LPs and one EP. His music has been featured in numerous television shows and films.

== Early life and education ==
Alexi Murdoch was born in London to an English mother, singer Louise Cordet, and a Greek father and lived in Greece until the age of ten, when his family settled in Scotland.

Murdoch moved to the United States in 1992 to study at Duke University, before moving to Los Angeles, California to live with his then girlfriend.

== Career ==
He first gained attention when Nic Harcourt began playing his music on KCRW. Despite increased interest, Murdoch largely turned down advances from record labels and continued to release his music independently.

=== Four Songs ===
He self-released the EP Four Songs through independent record stores and website CD Baby in November 2002. CD Baby sold over 50,000 copies of the release, becoming the site's all-time best-selling record.

In 2003, he performed at the South by Southwest (SXSW) Music Conference and that year's Sundance Film Festival, and, in 2004, at the Hollywood Reporter/Billboard Film & TV Music Conference. In 2004, the song "Orange Sky" from the EP also became the most-played song on Philadelphia indie station WXPN.

=== Time Without Consequence ===
Murdoch's first album, Time Without Consequence, was released on 6 June 2006 on his own label, Zero Summer. As with the EP, Murdoch continued to turn down the record deals he was offered from numerous major labels to maintain creative control. (The record was distributed nationally through Sony BMG.) Time Without Consequence peaked at No. 25 on the Billboard Heatseekers chart.

On 9 June 2006, Murdoch began a 34 city tour in conjunction with the Coalition of Independent Music Stores, with most bookings at independent record stores.

The album became one of the most licensed albums of the decade, receiving placements on dozens of films and television shows:

- "Orange Sky" appeared in The O.C., House, Prison Break, Ugly Betty, Dirty Sexy Money, Ladder 49, Suburgatory, and Southland, as well as in promotions for Oscar nominated foreign film, Paradise Now and a Honda commercial.
- "Home" appeared in a season 2 episode of Prison Break.
- "All My Days" was featured in The O.C., Grey's Anatomy, Scrubs, Without a Trace, Stargate Universe, Conversations with Friends, and a promo for Southland. It featured as the opening song in the movie Real Steel, the final episode of Years of Living Dangerously, and in the movie Away We Go. It featured at the end of the documentary "Lord Montagu", about the life of Edward Douglas-Scott-Montagu, 3rd Baron Montagu of Beaulieu.
- "Song For You" appeared in Everwood.
- "12" appeared in two television series: Brothers & Sisters and One Tree Hill.
- "Blue Mind" was featured in the 2008 adventure film The Sharp End,, played over the final credits sequence of the 2014 independent film WildLike, and was used in several episodes of Dawson's Creek.
- "Wait" was used in the shows Defying Gravity and Parenthood; as well as the movies "Different Flowers" and "Away We Go."
- "It's Only Fear" was used in the Brothers and Sisters.
- "Breathe" and "All My Days" were used in Stargate Universe, and the 2008 film Tenderness, where the album Time Without Consequence is also shown on a scene of the film.
- Nine of Murdoch's songs were used in the 2009 film Away We Go, constituting most of the soundtrack. Three of these were unreleased at the time; "Towards the Sun" and "Crinan Wood" were later released on Murdoch's 2011 album "Towards the Sun".
- Several songs were used in a surfing documentary One California Day. "Crinan Wood" was used in the episode "Chuck Versus the Masquerade" from the show Chuck.

=== Towards the Sun ===
Murdoch's second album, Towards the Sun, was initially released in 2009 in the US by Zero Summer Records. It was later released in the UK and Germany in 2011 by label City Slang. The song "Some Day Soon" appeared in a season 1 and a season 4 episode of This Is Us.

=== Touring ===
In the spring of 2009, Murdoch embarked on a headlining tour, during which he distributed an early version of a new album entitled Towards the Sun in a limited edition packaged in a hand-printed, cardboard sleeve.

Other bookings by Murdoch include two concerts in Berlin, one small club appearance and a second as part of the City Slang label's 20th anniversary. In February 2011, he performed in New York City as part of Lincoln Center's prestigious "American Songbook Series". Afterwards, he went on a sold-out tour of major markets throughout North America, including Philadelphia, Los Angeles, San Francisco, Seattle, Portland, Vancouver, Chicago, and Minneapolis. 2011 also saw the official release of his third recording, Towards The Sun.

=== Critical reception ===
Murdoch has been compared to the late British singer-songwriter Nick Drake. His first album Time Without Consequence was met with wide critical praise, gaining him five stars with Alternative Press as well as placing him on Rolling Stone's Top Ten Artists list. His second release Towards the Sun gathered high praise in both the US and Europe. PopMatters, giving the record a 9/10 calls Murdoch's performance "hauntingly beautiful" and "heartbreakingly lovely".

== Discography ==
=== Studio albums ===
- Time Without Consequence (Zero Summer Records, 2006)
- Towards the Sun (Zero Summer Records, City Slang, 2009)

=== Extended plays ===
- Four Songs (Mindblue Music, 2002, EP)

=== Original soundtrack albums ===
- Away We Go (Zero Summer, 2009)
