= Hard Charger =

Single by Porno for Pyros

from the album Private Parts
- Released: February 1997
- Genre: Alternative rock
- Length: 6:46; 4:40 (edit)
- Label: Warner Bros.
- Songwriter: Perry Farrell
- Producers: John King and Perry Farrell

Porno for Pyros singles chronology
"Dogs Rule the Night" (1996)	"Hard Charger" (1997)	"Agua" (2023)

"Hard Charger" is a song written by Perry Farrell and recorded by Porno for Pyros. Dave Navarro and Flea play guitar and bass guitar on the track, which would lead them to join Jane's Addiction later that year.

"Hard Charger" was released as the first single from Private Parts: The Album, the soundtrack to Howard Stern's 1997 film Private Parts.

== Music video ==
A music video of the radio edit, directed by Liz Friedlander (credited as Alan Smithee) and featuring clips from the Private Parts film, and Geoff Nelson, received airplay on MTV during February 1997.

== Track listing ==
1. "Hard Charger (Radio Edit)" - 4:40
2. "Pete's Dad" (recorded live at 1993 KROQ Acoustic Christmas concert) - 4:39
3. "Pets" - 3:36 (from 1993's Porno for Pyros)
4. "Hard Charger (Album Version)" - 6:46

== Personnel ==
- Perry Farrell - vocals
- Stephen Perkins - drums
- Peter DiStefano - guitar
- Dave Navarro - guitar
- Flea - bass
