= Thomas Johnson (music producer) =

American audio engineer, producer and musician

Thomas “TJ” Johnson (born November 27, 1957, in Thomasville, North Carolina) is an American audio engineer, producer, and musician. He is best known for his work with Porno for Pyros and Rancid.

Johnson has been an active professional in the industry since 1981, and trained at the Recording Workshop, an audio-engineering school in Chillicothe, Ohio.

Johnson's involvement with Porno for Pyros began during the recording of their second album, Good God's Urge, on which Johnson engineered, co-produced, and played. Following the album's release, Johnson toured with Porno for Pyros from 1995 until the spring of 1997, providing samples, playing keyboards, and singing backing vocals. During that time, Johnson also recorded new tracks for what should have been Porno for Pyros's third album, which were instead released on Perry Farrell’s solo effort Song Yet to Be Sung and Jane's Addiction’s Kettle Whistle.

Johnson has worked with an array of major and independent labels including Sony Music, Warner Bros. Records, Capitol Records, Mercury Records, Virgin Records, Geffen, and RCA. He also did work for Epitaph Records, and its offshoot, Hellcat Records.

In the spring of 1997, Johnson started a long relationship with Rancid, resulting in his recording Life Won't Wait and Rancid 2000 for the Bay Area punk band.

Although still active in the recording realm, Johnson now teaches in the Entertainment Technology Department at Guilford Technical Community College (GTCC).

== 2010 ==
Band	Album	Details
The Internationals	Busted!	Engineer

== 2007 ==
Band	Album	Details
Steve Lynch	Network 23	Engineer

== 2006 ==
Band	Album	Details
Hellcat Records Presents:	Give 'Em the Boot V	(Hellcat) Engineer

== 2002 ==
Band	Album	Details
Hellcat Records Presents:	Give 'Em the Boot III	(Hellcat) Engineer
That Darn Punk Original Soundtrack	Original Soundtrack	(Kung Fu)Engineer

== 2001 ==
Band	Album	Details
Perry Farrell	Song Yet To Be Sung	(Virgin) Programming, Engineer
Various Artists	Punk-O-Rama, Vol. 6	(Epitaph) Engineer/Mix

== 2000 ==
Band	Album	Details
Rancid	Rancid 2000 (#5)	(Epitaph) Engineer/Mix
The Manhattan Project	The Manhattan Project	(Forsaken Recordings) Engineer
Various Artists	Punk-O-Rama, Vol. 5	(Epitaph) Engineer/Mix
Voodoo Glow Skulls	Symbolic	(Epitaph) Engineer
The Distillers	The Distillers	(Hellcat/Epitaph) Produced, Engineered, & Mixed

== 1999 ==
Band	Album	Details
Various Artists	Punk-O-Rama, Vol. 4	(Epitaph) Engineer/Mix
Perry Farrell	Rev	(Warner Brothers) Produced, Engineered, Mixed, Performed
Tiger Army	Tiger Army	(Hellcat/Epitaph) Mixed
Hellcat Record Presents:	Give 'Em the Boot II	(Hellcat/Epitaph) Engineered, Mixed, Performed
F-Minus	F-Minus	(Hellcat/Epitaph) Engineered & Mixed
Dropkick Murphys	The Gang's All Here	(Hellcat/Epitaph) Mixed
Rancid	Clash Tribute LP	(Sony) Mixed

== 1998 ==
Band	Album	Details
Lisa Simpson & George Clinton	The Simpsons' Yellow Album	(Geffen) Engineered Single
Joe Strummer (It's a Rockin' World)	Chef-Aid	(Sony) Engineered
Rancid (Brad Logan Single)	Chef-Aid	(Sony) Engineered
Mike Watt	Hempilation Vol. 2	(Capricorn) Engineered & Mixed
The Specials	Guilty 'Til Proved Innocent!	(Grilled Cheese) Engineered
Rancid	Life Won't Wait	(Epitaph) Engineered & Mixed
Dr. Israel	Inna City Pressure	(Epitaph) Engineered
F-Minus	F-Minus	(Hellcat/Epitaph) Engineered & Mixed

== 1997 ==
Band	Album	Details
Porno For Pyros	Free Tibet EP	Performed
Jane's Addiction	Kettle Whistle	(Warner Bros) Engineered & Performed
Banyan	CyberOctave	Engineered & Performed

== 1996 ==
Band	Album	Details
Porno For Pyros	The Cable Guy Soundtrack	(Sony) Engineered, Mixed, & Performed
Porno For Pyros	Good God's Urge	(Warner Bros.) Produced, Engineered, Mixed, & Performed
Yoko Ono & IMA	Kurushii Remix	(Capital) Engineered, Mixed, & Produced
The Mighty Mighty Bosstones	B-sides	(Mercury) Engineered & Mixed

== 1995 ==
Band	Album	Details
Maids of Gravity	Maids of Gravity	(Vernon Yard/Virgin) Engineered & Mixed
Edna Swap	Edna Swap	(East/West) Engineered & Mixed

== 1994 ==
Band	Album	Details
700 Miles	Dirtbomb	(RCA) Engineered & Mixed
April's Motel Room	Black 14	(Immortal/Sony) Engineered & Mixed
April's Motel Room	EP	(Immortal/Sony) Engineered & Mixed
Porno For Pyros	A Little Sadness	(Warner Bros.) Engineered
The Mighty Mighty Bosstones	Detroit Rock City	(Mercury) Engineered & Mixed
July Alley	Debut LP	(Columbia) Engineered & Mixed
Foley	7 Years Ago	(Motown) Engineered & Mixed
