= Behind the Player: Stephen Perkins =

Behind The Player: Stephen Perkins

Video by Stephen Perkins
- Released: November 1, 2008
- Length: 72:00
- Label: IMV
- Director: Leon Melas
- Producers: Ken Mayer & Sean E DeMott

Behind The Player: Stephen Perkins is an interactive music video of Jane's Addiction drummer, Stephen Perkins.

Released on November 1, 2008, by IMV, the DVD has Perkins giving in-depth drum lessons on how to play, "Mountain Song" and "Been Caught Stealing" by Jane's Addiction and "Pets" by Porno for Pyros and an intimate behind-the-scenes look at his life as a professional musician. Perkins jams "Mountain Song" and "Been Caught Stealing" with Slipknot bass guitarist Paul Gray, as well as other bonus material.

IMV donates $0.25 from the sale of each DVD to Little Kids Rock, an organization that provides instruments to underprivileged children.

== Contents ==
Behind The Player

Perkins talks about his background, influences and gear, including rare photos and video

"Mountain Song" by Jane's Addiction

- Lesson: Perkins gives an in-depth drum lesson for how to play the song
- Jam: Perkins jams the track with the Slipknot bass guitarist Paul Gray

"Been Caught Stealing" by Jane's Addiction

- Lesson: Perkins gives an in-depth drum lesson for how to play the song
- Jam: Perkins jams the track with the Slipknot bass guitarist Gray

"Pets" by Porno for Pyros

- Lesson: Perkins gives an in-depth drum lesson on how to play the song

Special features

- Banyan Clips
- Three Days Trailer
- Little Kids Rock promotional video

== Personnel ==
- Produced by: Ken Mayer & Sean E Demott
- Directed by: Leon Melas
- Executive producer: Marc Reiser & Kim Jordan
- Director of photography: William Murray
- Sound engineer: Will Thompson
- Edited by: Jeff Morose
- Sound mix by: Matt Chidgey & Cedrick Courtois
- Graphics by: Thayer Demay
- Camera operators: Jimmy Alioto, Ben Booker, Jethro Rothe-Kushal
- Gaffer: Ken Jenkins

- Assistant director: Matt Pick
- Production assistant: Laine Proctor
- Lighting and grip: Mcnulty Nielson
- Artist hospitality: Sasha Mayer
- Shot at: The Chop Shop, Hollywood
- Special guest: Paul Gray
- Cover photo by: Alex Solca
- Video courtesy of: Kevin Ford, Carter B. Smith, Three Days Llc, Rhino Records
- Photos courtesy of: Neil Zlozower, Carter B. Smith, Dw Drums, Kevin Ford, The Chop Shop, Alex Solca
