= Anytime at All =

Studio album by Banyan
- Released: February 23, 1999
- Recorded: 1998
- Genre: Instrumental, fusion, rock
- Length: 69 minutes
- Label: CyberOctave
- Producer: Stephen Perkins, Dave Aron, Willie Waldman

Banyan chronology
Banyan (1997)	Anytime at All (1999)	Live at Perkins' Palace (2004)

Professional ratings
Review scores
Source	Rating
AllMusic	4.5/5 stars

Anytime at All is the second album by the American rock band Banyan, founded by Stephen Perkins of Jane's Addiction and Porno for Pyros fame, and Emit Bloch. The record features nearly two dozens players, half of whom are well-known. Like their debut album, Anytime at All is dedicated to Perkins' deceased brother, Marc. The album is more upbeat and organic-sounding than the band's previous work, with the songs showcasing a greater variety.

== Track listing ==
1. "Buzzards & Worms" (Stephen Perkins, Martin LeNoble) – 3:34
2. "Justine" (Stephen Perkins, William Waldman, Rob Wasserman) – 5:04
3. "Steel Head" (Stephen Perkins, Ross Rice, William Waldman, Rob Wasserman, Bad Azz) – 3:45
4. "Looped + Faded" (Dave Aron) – 4:58
5. "Grease the System" (Stephen Perkins, Flea, John Frusciante, Joey Klaparda, Mike Watt, William Waldman) – 4:23
6. "La Sirena" (Stephen Perkins, Mike Watt, John Frusciante) – 3:10
7. "Cactus Soil" (Stephen Perkins) – 2:15
8. "Keep the Change" (Stephen Perkins, Cindy Juarez, Tommy D., William Waldman, Rob Wasserman) – 4:45
9. "Lovin' Them Pounds" (Mike Watt) – 4:39
10. "Early Bird" (Stephen Perkins, Buckethead) – 2:30
11. "Sputnik" (Stephen Perkins, Buckethead, Mike Watt) – 6:33
12. "The Apple and the Seed" (Stephen Perkins, William Waldman, Rob Wasserman, Dave Aron, Ross Rice, Clint Wagner) – 14:54
13. "New Old Hat" (Nels Cline) – 7:18 (8:33 including Early Bird outro)
14. "Untitled" (hidden track) (Banyan) – 0:04

== Personnel ==
- Stephen Perkins – drums & percussion
- Willie Waldman – trumpet (tracks 1–3, 6, 8, 9, 11–13)
- Rob Wasserman – upright bass (1–3, 8, 12)
- Dave Aron – clarinet, programming (1, 2, 4, 9, 12)
- Martyn LeNoble – bass (1)
- Flea – bass (5)
- Mike Watt – bass (6, 9, 11, 13)
- Clint Wagner – guitar (1–3, 12)
- Patrick Butler – guitar (4, 5)
- John Frusciante – guitar (5, 6)
- Jason Burke – guitar (8)
- Nels Cline – guitar (9, 13)
- Buckethead – guitar (10, 11)
- Ross Rice – keyboards (1–3, 12)
- Stafford Floyd – keyboards (4, 12, 13)
- Bad Azz – vocals (3)
- Joey Klaparda – vocals (6)
- Cindy Juarez Perkins – vocals (8)
- Tommy D. Daugherty – programming (8)
- Michael Mattioli – saxophone (2)
- Leo Chelyapov – clarinet (13)
- Tom Lemke – sound EFX (8, 11)
