= Strays (Jane's Addiction album) =

Studio album by Jane's Addiction
- Released: July 22, 2003
- Recorded: 2002–2003
- Studios: Henson, Hollywood
- Genres: Nu metal; hard rock; alternative rock
- Length: 48:22
- Label: Capitol
- Producers: Bob Ezrin; Brian Virtue

Jane's Addiction chronology
Kettle Whistle (1997)	Strays (2003)	Up from the Catacombs – The Best of Jane's Addiction (2006)

Singles from Strays
- 1. "Just Because" Released: July 15, 2003; 2. "True Nature" Released: October 27, 2003

Strays is the third studio album by the American rock band Jane's Addiction, released on July 22, 2003, on Capitol Records. Released 13 years after Ritual de lo Habitual (1990), the album marks the band's longest gap between full studio albums, although the group had recorded and released two new songs six years prior on the compilation album Kettle Whistle (1997). Strays is the first album to feature bassist Chris Chaney. Regarding the decision to record a new studio album after such a long hiatus, drummer Stephen Perkins stated that the band had already completed two reunion tours performing old material, and that Jane's was ready for "a new challenge."

Upon its first week of release, the album sold 110,500 copies in the United States, debuting at number four on the Billboard 200, and was eventually certified Gold in both United States and Canada, and silver in the United Kingdom. The single, "Just Because", was nominated for a Grammy Award in 2004.

== Background and recording ==
"I keep kind of asking, 'Hey, want to work on something fresh? Let's just see where we end up,'" remarked singer Perry Farrell in 2001. "I don't want it to be premeditated, but my wish is that we do kick into it and do a full, new Jane's Addiction album… I made the best music with these guys."

According to drummer Stephen Perkins, "It all started around March or April 2002 with Bob Ezrin producing a Porno for Pyros track for the movie Dark Blue: an incredible song called "Streets of Fire" which was just epic. That segued into the Strays project."

The band entered Henson Recording Studios in 2002, with producers Ezrin and Brian Virtue. Of the former, Farrell said: "He raises the bar for all of us. It's like training for the Olympics - something you're aspiring towards in creating art. You're trying to make the most beautiful music, you try to break new ground creating sound that no one's ever heard before. When working with Bob, doing that becomes a very real possibility."

Bassist Martyn LeNoble was fired halfway through the recording. "I recorded pretty much the whole Strays record," he said. "And Perry erased it. He suddenly fired me on the spot in Japan when we still had a whole flight back to the U.S. That's the last time I talked to him. Perry and Bob (Ezrin) replaced all my bass parts on Strays. Perry was saying everything I played sounded like shit, but then they had the new guy pretty much play exactly my parts, maybe a couple of little changes, so I guess they couldn't have been that shitty." LeNoble was aggrieved by the band not paying him for his studio work after his firing, which caused him financial hardship.

LeNoble was replaced by Chris Chaney, whom Dave Navarro described as "perhaps the most intense musician I've ever worked with." "Dave and Stephen have been playing together since they were 13 years old," Chaney noted. "They have quite a synergy or chemistry – and for me as a bass player to be able to come into that is really remarkable. It gives me a great opportunity to shine. I did a record with Tommy Lee and we needed a drummer to go tour with, and what better drummer than Stephen Perkins. I was only able to do it for about six weeks because I was playing with Alanis Morissette and I had to go back to that. But, in that short time, Stephen and I had a great relationship and last August he called me and asked me to do some shows."

=== Artwork ===
Cover artwork created for the album by Storm Thorgerson was rejected by the band, and used instead on The Bottom Half by Umphrey's McGee. "I had thought, mistakenly, how appropriate my onion ladies would be," recalled Thorgerson, "following in the footsteps of Nothing's Shocking and Ritual de lo Habitual, but with an added dash of silliness… Worse was to come: Jane's Addiction decided instead to use a photo of the band on their cover: not so clever nor razor-like. Nothing gets my goat more than being turned down in favour of mediocrity or crap."

=== Musical style and inspirations ===
Vocalist Perry Farrell states that the band "went into the studio thinking fast, hard, modern and to the point." Strays was labeled by critics as "nu metal", a genre which the band was a precursor to.

=== DualDisc version ===
This album was included among a group of 15 DualDisc releases that were test-marketed in two cities: Boston and Seattle. The DualDisc version of the album was not reissued after the test-market run. It has the standard album on the CD side and bonus material on the DVD side, including a 5.1 surround mix of the entire album.

The surround mix is encoded in Dolby Digital and lossless MLP (DVD Audio), and is only available on the DualDisc. All other bonus material is identical with the album's regular CD/DVD version.

== Reception ==
Professional ratings
Aggregate scores
Source	Rating
Metacritic	75/100
Review scores
Source	Rating
AllMusic	3/5 stars
Entertainment Weekly	B+
The Guardian	5/5 stars
Los Angeles Times	2/4 stars
Mojo	4/5 stars
NME	8/10
Pitchfork	5.8/10
Q	4/5 stars
Rolling Stone	4/5 stars
USA Today	3.5/4 stars

The album received generally positive reviews, with a Metacritic score of 75, based on 19 reviews. Playlouder noted, "Their glee and enthusiasm can be heard coursing through every bar." NME cited it as "one of the best rock albums of 2003". Alternative Press called it "better than anyone could have predicted." The Boston Globe said, "The new Jane's sounds a lot like the old Jane's. It is hard rock, with none of the trippiness that defined singer Perry Farrell's post- Addiction band, Porno for Pyros, or the electronic maundering that marred his lone solo album, 2001's Song Yet to Be Sung." IGN awarded Strays 7.5 out of 10 and stated, "Basically the band has not ventured too far from the sounds they exhibited on 1990's Ritual De La Habitual [sic], making Strays sound like the follow-up that could/should have happened 13 years ago. All of which makes me wonder what this album would have sounded like if they'd been making music together during the past decade. Yet despite these shortcomings, Strays is a valiant effort by a band that not only changed the face of Los Angeles rock, but still knows how to (rock, that is)."

"There's much of the old aggression and quirkiness," noted Classic Rock, "with early Farrell influence The Cure poking their way to the surface… but it's cleaner, tighter, more direct. Often, such as with 'Strays' itself, this approach works extremely well: the band power on as Navarro peels off double-tracked and imaginative solos. Farrell's vocal is more conventional, but now and then returns reassuringly to the yelp of old – although now sparingly deployed for greater effect."

Giving the album a C+, Stylus Magazine noted that it is "good in its own right, but perhaps you're better off listening to it in isolation from the rest of their canon". Pitchfork Media claimed, "Strays lacks what made the band great in the first place: believable songs and lyrics."

In 2005, Strays was ranked number 404 in Rock Hard magazine's book The 500 Greatest Rock & Metal Albums of All Time. In 2009, Navarro stated that he "really liked [Strays]. I had a great time working with Bob Ezrin, who produced it. That's what makes doing stuff like this really amazing for me." In 2011, Perkins stated that the album was "an interesting point in our sound."

== Track listing ==
No.	Title	Writer(s)	Length
1.	"True Nature"	Perry Farrell, Dave Navarro, Stephen Perkins, Bob Ezrin, Martyn LeNoble	3:49
2.	"Strays"	Farrell, Navarro, Perkins, Ezrin, Aaron Embry, David J	4:32
3.	"Just Because"	Farrell, Navarro, Perkins, Ezrin, Chris Chaney	3:51
4.	"Price I Pay"	Farrell, Navarro, Perkins, Ezrin, Chaney	5:27
5.	"The Riches"	Farrell, Navarro, Perkins, Ezrin, LeNoble, Embry	5:44
6.	"Superhero"	Farrell, Navarro, Perkins, Ezrin, Embry	3:58
7.	"Wrong Girl"	Farrell, Navarro, Perkins, Ezrin, Chaney	4:32
8.	"Everybody's Friend"	Farrell, Navarro, Perkins, Ezrin	3:18
9.	"Suffer Some"	Farrell, Navarro, Perkins, Ezrin, LeNoble	4:14
10.	"Hypersonic"	Farrell, Navarro, Perkins, Ezrin, LeNoble	3:32
11.	"To Match the Sun"	Farrell, Navarro, Perkins, Ezrin, LeNoble	5:25
Total length:			48:22

=== Bonus DVD contents ===
30 minutes of never-before seen live, studio and interview footage. Live cuts: "Just Because", "Strays" (2 versions), "Price I Pay"

=== DualDisc exclusive contents ===
In addition to the contents available on the regular DVD: entire album in 5.1 surround sound in Dolby Digital (DVD-Video) or lossless MLP (DVD-Audio)

== Personnel ==
Jane's Addiction

- Perry Farrell – lead vocals, programming
- Dave Navarro – guitars, piano
- Stephen Perkins – drums, percussion
- Chris Chaney – bass guitar, piano

Additional musicians

- Marc VanGool - guitar, studio technician
- Aaron Embry – keyboards, kalimba
- Zac Rae – keyboards
- Scott Page – saxophones
- John Shanks – mandolin
- Mike Finnegan – organ
- Kim Hill – backing vocals
- Dionna Brooks-Jackson – backing vocals
- Leanna Sterios – orchestral arrangements

Recording personnel

- Bob Ezrin – producer, mixing, additional keyboards, percussion, orchestral arrangements
- Brian Virtue – producer, engineer, mixing, programming
- James Murray – additional engineering
- Alex Gibson – additional engineering
- Brian Humphrey – assistant engineer
- Alex Uychocde – assistant engineer
- Joe Bishara – programming
- Brenden Hawkins – additional programming
- James Murray – additional programming
- Brian Gardner – mastering

== Charts ==
Chart (2003)	Peak position
Australian Albums (ARIA)	9
Belgian Albums (Ultratop Flanders)	42
Canadian Albums (Billboard)	4
Dutch Albums (Album Top 100)	94
Finnish Albums (Suomen virallinen lista)	26
French Albums (SNEP)	48
German Albums (Offizielle Top 100)	43
Irish Albums (IRMA)	22
Italian Albums (FIMI)	23
New Zealand Albums (RMNZ)	16
Norwegian Albums (VG-lista)	13
Portuguese Albums (AFP)	29
Scottish Albums (Official Charts)	11
Swiss Albums (Schweizer Hitparade)	60
UK Albums (Official Charts)	14
US Billboard 200	4

== Certifications ==
Region	Certification	Certified units/sales
Canada (Music Canada)	Gold	50,000^{^}
United Kingdom (BPI)	Silver	60,000^{^}
United States (RIAA)	Gold	500,000^{^}
^{^} Shipments figures based on certification alone.

== Selected quotes ==
- Perry Farrell: Working with Bob Ezrin on Strays meant a lot because I knew that Dave loved Pink Floyd's The Wall, which Ezrin produced. Dave learned The Wall (as a kid). He can play the whole album note for note. I knew he'd instantly have a lot of respect for him.
- Bob Ezrin: My job on Strays was to bring a sort of commonality to the process and make everyone think it was a group effort again and not just a bunch of solo projects trying to be strung together.
- Martyn LeNoble: Bob Ezrin didn't really understand Jane's Addiction musically. I remember arguing with him, "Have you listened to Ritual?" He goes, "Frankly, I can't get through it. I think it sounds horrible. I'm going to make this a real rock band instead of an art rock band." Well, he succeeded. He took all the magic out of it. He made a rock record. The most magical moments on the Jane's Addiction records are the quiet little adventures to the left, and, of course Eric Avery's magic bass.
