= Rev (Perry Farrell album) =

Compilation album by Perry Farrell
- Released: November 11, 1999
- Genre: Alternative rock
- Length: 65:07
- Label: Warner Bros.
- Producer: Dave Jerden

Perry Farrell chronology
Rev (1999)	Song Yet to Be Sung (2001)

Rev is an album by Jane's Addiction vocalist Perry Farrell, released in 1999. It is a combination of solo work and a best-of for the singer's bands.

== Background ==
To fulfill requirements on a contract with Warner Bros. Records, this album was produced with a combination of solo, Jane's Addiction, and Porno for Pyros recordings. Originally, the solo tracks were intended for a side project called "Gobalee". The title track features Tom Morello and John Frusciante on guitars. Farrell signed with Virgin Records shortly after Rev's release.

== Track listing ==
1. "Rev"
2. "Whole Lotta Love"
3. "Been Caught Stealing" [12" Remix Version]
4. "Jane Says"
5. "Stop" (Edit)
6. "Mountain Song"
7. "Summertime Rolls"
8. "Kimberly Austin"
9. "Tonight"
10. "Tahitian Moon"
11. "Pets"
12. "Cursed Male"
13. "100 Ways"
14. "Hard Charger" (Edit)
15. "Ripple"
16. "Satellite of Love"

=== Promo ===
1. "Rev"
2. "Been Caught Stealing" [12" Remix Version]
3. "Kimberly Austin"
4. "Satellite of Love"
