= Kind Heaven =

Studio album by Perry Farrell
- Released: June 7, 2019
- Recorded: 2018
- Genre: Rock
- Length: 31:05
- Labels: PerryEttyVS, BMG Rights Management
- Producers: Perry Farrell, Tony Visconti

Perry Farrell chronology
Song Yet to Be Sung (2001)	Kind Heaven (2019)

Singles from Kind Heaven
- 1. "Pirate Punk Politician" Released: March 29, 2019

Kind Heaven is the second studio album by American musician Perry Farrell. The album was released on June 7, 2019, by PerryEttyVS and BMG Rights Management.

== Critical reception ==
Professional ratings
Aggregate scores
Source	Rating
Metacritic	70/100
Review scores
Source	Rating
AllMusic	3.5/5 stars
American Songwriter	3.5/5 stars
Consequence of Sound	D+
The Independent	4/5 stars

Kind Heaven received generally positive reviews from critics. At Metacritic, which assigns a normalized rating out of 100 to reviews from critics, the album received an average score of 70, which indicates "generally favorable reviews", based on 10 reviews.

== Track listing ==
No.	Title	Length
1.	"(red, white, and blue) Cheerfulness"	2:20
2.	"Pirate Punk Politician"	2:50
3.	"Snakes Have Many Hips"	3:27
4.	"Machine Girl"	3:35
5.	"One"	4:02
6.	"Where Have You Been All My Life"	3:25
7.	"More Than I Could Bear"	4:17
8.	"Spend the Body"	3:01
9.	"Let's All Pray for This World"	4:08
Total length:		31:05

== Charts ==
Chart (2019)	Peak position
US Independent Albums (Billboard)	14
US Heatseekers Albums (Billboard)	2
