= Martyn LeNoble =

Dutch bassist (born 1969)

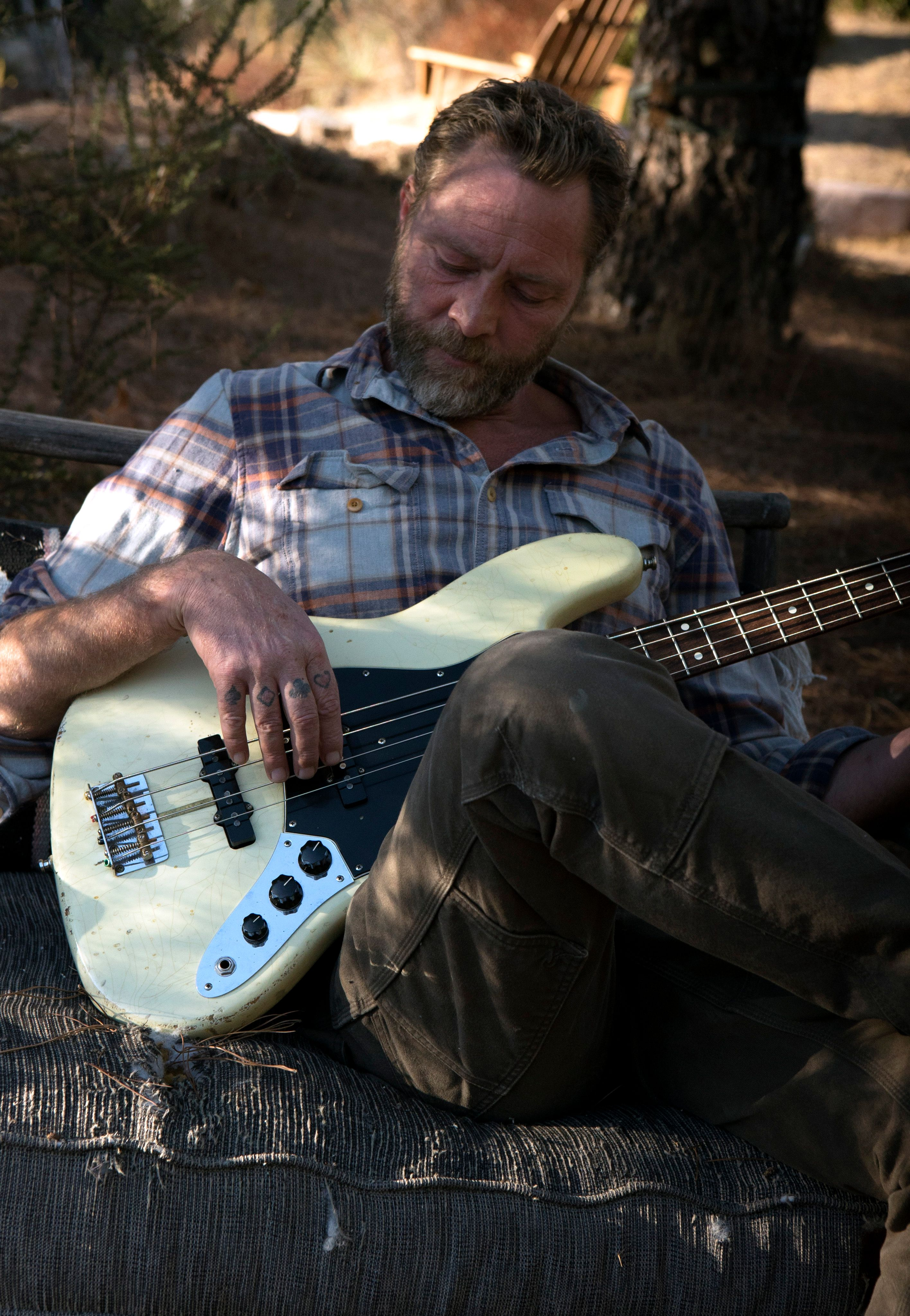
- LeNoble in 2020

Background information
- Born: 14 April 1969 (age 57); Vlaardingen, Netherlands
- Genres: Punk rock; alternative rock; hard rock
- Occupation: Musician
- Instrument: Bass
- Years active: 1983–present
- Spouse: Christina Applegate (m. 2013)

Martyn LeNoble (Dutch: Martijn LeNoble; born 14 April 1969) is a Dutch bassist and a founding member of the alternative rock band Porno for Pyros.

He started his musical career by playing bass in a Dutch punk rock band when he was 14. In 1989, he moved to Los Angeles and played with Thelonious Monster and the Too Free Stooges. In 1992, he joined Peter DiStefano, Stephen Perkins and Perry Farrell to form Porno for Pyros.

LeNoble has worked, recorded, toured, or performed with artists including Jane's Addiction, the Cult, Dave Gahan, Scott Weiland, Mark Lanegan, Soulsavers, Daniel Lanois, Maria McKee, Sarah McLachlan, Layne Staley, Tom Morello, and Josh Klinghoffer.

== Personal life ==
In 2008, LeNoble began dating actress Christina Applegate. They married in February 2013. It is the second marriage for both. They have one daughter together, and LeNoble has another daughter from a previous relationship.

== Discography ==
- 1992: Thelonious Monster – Beautiful Mess
- 1993: Porno for Pyros – Porno for Pyros
- 1996: Porno for Pyros – Good God's Urge
- 1998: Scott Weiland – 12 Bar Blues
- 1998: Class of '99 – "Another Brick in the Wall (Part 2)" from The Faculty
- 1999: Perry Farrell – Rev (compilation)
- 1999: Banyan – "Buzzards & Worms" on Anytime at All
- 1999: The Wondergirls – "Let's Go All the Way" and "Drop That Baby"
- 2001: The Cult – Beyond Good and Evil
- 2001: Perry Farrell – Song Yet to Be Sung
- 2003: Mike Martt – Tomorrow Shines Bright
- 2003: Jane's Addiction – Strays
- 2004: Dave Gahan – Live Monsters
- 2008: Mina Caputo – A Fondness for Hometown Scars
- 2009: Soulsavers – Broken
- 2012: Mark Lanegan Band – Blues Funeral
- 2012: Soulsavers – The Light the Dead See
- 2014: Mark Lanegan Band – Phantom Radio (including No Bells on Sunday EP)
- 2015: Dave Gahan & Soulsavers – Angels & Ghosts
- 2015: Soulsavers – Kubrick
- 2015: Wildlights – Wildlights
- 2017: Mark Lanegan Band – Gargoyle
- 2019: Mark Lanegan Band – Somebody's Knocking
- 2020: Thelonious Monster – Oh That Monster
- 2020: Black Phoebe – Black Phoebe
- 2021: Dave Gahan & Soulsavers – Imposter
- 2025: Martyn LeNoble – What I Know (If Only) (single)
