= Emit Bloch =

American musician (born 1965)

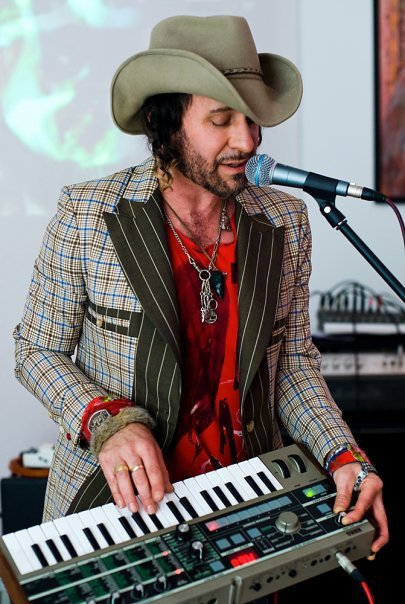

David Edmund Turin (born 8 September 1965), known as Emit Bloch, is an American songwriter and musician.

== Background ==
Emit Bloch is a songwriter, musician and journalist referenced for field recordings and lo-fi music production. His parents are George L. Turin, a professor of Electrical Engineering and Computer Sciences at UC Berkeley, and Helen Elizabeth Turin, the daughter of a Utah cattle rancher. Bloch was raised in Berkeley, California, as well as Layton, Utah, and is related to Christopher Layton, a prominent 19th Century Mormon pioneer.

== Career ==
Bloch has issued several notable collections, with his 2010 release Dictaphones Vol. 1 garnering 5/5 stars in UNCUT, the magazine calling Bloch an "exceptional songwriter" and the release "utterly remarkable", as well as frequent radio play on BBC stations when it was issued on One Little Independent records. London's The Sun called the record "...fresh, vital, uncluttered and brilliant" and awarded it 4.5/5 stars.

The subsequent digital EP, "Dorothy," included some studio versions of songs on Dictaphones Vol. 1 and received UK-wide acclaim when it was selected by The London Times as "Hot Download of the Week" and its eponymous single was championed by Dermot O'Leary, Gideon Coe and several other mainstream BBC DJs.

In 2000, Bloch wrote and recorded the occult Milla Jovovich, The People Tree Sessions, for his internet imprint Peopletree, an early example of internet marketing. The largely field recorded release was chosen as the "Pop CD of the Week" and given 4/5 stars by the newspaper The Guardian, which stated that the record was "so barking, it's great".

In the late 1990s, Bloch co-founded the experimental jamming band Banyan with drummer Stephen Perkins, bassist Mike Watt, keyboardist Money Mark and guitarist Nels Cline and co-produced Banyan, the band's first release for Higher Octave with Perkins and The Dust Brothers. Bloch met Perkins when working with Perry Farrell to develop Teeth, an early, internet-based music and film project funded by Lollapalooza.

After a long hiatus, Bloch released Collectives Vol.2, a follow-up to Dictaphones Vol. 1, which saw a stylistic departure from lo-fi recording and embraced a "stoner rock" sound filled out by appearances from rock heavy-weight Perkins, and guitarist Nick McCabe (The Verve, Black Submarine).

On Nov. 15, 2022, Bloch issued 'Emit Bloch: Rock,' a third album-length collection of songs recorded with a band and also featuring performances by McCabe as well as longtime collaborator David Peters, and his daughter, Grace InSpace (drums). The album was released on Bloch's TFFTT imprint, located in Del Norte County, California. In 2022, TFFTT also released a collection of B-Sides, 'Canteen', and an Xmas song, 'I Misspelled Santa 'Satan''.

== Discography ==
- Banyan (Higher Octave) 1997
- The People Tree Sessions 1998 (Cherry Red)
- Bouncy Castle (Peopletree) 2000 - out of print
- Sexy Religion Falafelelf (Peopletree/iDot/One Little Indian) 2001
- Swing Falafelelf (Peopletree/iDot/One Little Indian) 2003
- Monsta (One Little Indian) 2006
- Dictaphones Vol.1 (Lost Dogs/One Little Indian) 2010
- Collectives Vol.2 (AWAL) 2018
- Rocks (TFFTT/AWAL) 2022
- Canteen (TFFTT/AWWAL) 2022
