= Pets (song) =

1993 single by Porno for Pyros

Single by Porno for Pyros

from the album Porno for Pyros
- Released: 1993
- Recorded: Mid-1992
- Studio: Crystal Sound (Los Angeles)
- Length: 3:36
- Label: Warner Bros.
- Songwriter: Porno for Pyros
- Producers: Perry Farrell; Matt Hyde

Porno for Pyros singles chronology
"Cursed Female / Cursed Male" (1993)	"Pets" (1993)	"Meija" (1993)

"Pets" is a song by American alternative rock band Porno for Pyros and the second single from their 1993 self-titled album Porno for Pyros. "The Cursed Female / Cursed Male" single preceded "Pets", but saw only a limited radio station and promotional release, making "Pets" the first widely available commercial single from the album.

"Pets" became a No. 1 hit on the US Billboard Modern Rock Tracks chart. In Australia, the song reached number 68 and came in at number 33 on the 1993 Triple J Hottest 100 countdown. The song's success was partly aided by a video directed by Jonathan Dayton and Valerie Faris that received heavy rotation on MTV. They would later direct the critically acclaimed film Little Miss Sunshine.

== Song information ==
"Pets" deals with dissatisfaction with the human race ("Adults are even more fucked up") and how it is on the brink of destruction ("My friend says we're like the dinosaurs only we are doing ourselves in much faster than they ever did"). The song then describes how aliens might be able to take over the world and treat humans as pets.

A single/radio edit, included on all versions of the single, censored profanity to make the song acceptable for radio play. No material was cut; the edit had virtually the same running length as the album version. Commercially, the song reached No. 67 on the US Billboard Hot 100, No. 1 on the Billboard Modern Rock Tracks chart and No. 53 on the UK Singles Chart. In Australia, "Pets" peaked at number 68 on the ARIA Singles Chart and was ranked No. 33 on the Triple J Hottest 100 countdown for 1993.

Most versions of the single included the previously unreleased non-album track "Tonight", recorded during the Porno for Pyros album sessions. "Tonight" is a cover of a song written by Leonard Bernstein and Stephen Sondheim in 1956 for the Broadway musical West Side Story.

The non-album B-side "Cursed Female / Cursed Male (Medley)" found on some versions of the single was previously released on Porno for Pyros' first single, "Cursed Female / Cursed Male".

== Packaging ==
There were several different versions of the "Pets" single released in 1993. The standard (and most common) version, released on both CD and 7" vinyl, included only the radio edit of the title track and the B-side "Tonight."

The second limited-edition version, also made available on CD and vinyl, featured two additional tracks as well as three full-panel band photos. The 12" vinyl picture disc featured the cover art from the album Porno for Pyros embossed on the A-side of the vinyl itself, while the B-side featured the band's red "Devil" logo. The additional tracks found on this version were the standard album version of "Pets" and "Cursed Female / Cursed Male (Medley)".

Various other import and promotional versions were released, all containing some combination of these four tracks.

== Track listings ==
=== Standard edition ===
All tracks are written by Porno for Pyros (Perry Farrell, Stephen Perkins, Martyn LeNoble and Peter DiStefano) except where noted.

No.	Title	Writer(s)	Length
1.	"Pets" (radio edit)		3:37
2.	"Tonight" (previously unreleased)	Leonard Bernstein, Stephen Sondheim	3:35
Total length:			7:12

=== Limited edition ===
No.	Title	Writer(s)	Length
1.	"Pets" (radio edit)		3:37
2.	"Pets" (LP version)		3:36
3.	"Tonight" (previously unreleased)	Leonard Bernstein, Stephen Sondheim	3:35
4.	"Cursed Female / Cursed Male Medley"		7:08
Total length:			17:56

== Charts ==
=== Weekly charts ===
Chart (1993)	Peak position
Australia (ARIA)	68
Canada Top Singles (RPM)	70
UK Singles (Official Charts)	53
US Billboard Hot 100	67
US Album Rock Tracks (Billboard)	25
US Modern Rock Tracks (Billboard)	1

=== Year-end charts ===
Chart (1993)	Position
US Modern Rock Tracks (Billboard)	7

== Release history ==
Region	Date	Format(s)	Label(s)	Ref.
United States	1993	CD; cassette	Warner Bros.	
Australia	June 21, 1993	CD; cassette	Warner Bros.	

== See also ==
- List of Billboard number-one alternative singles of the 1990s
- Triple J Hottest 100, 1993
