= Banyan (album) =

Studio album by Banyan
- Released: May 6, 1997
- Recorded: 1995–1997
- Genre: Instrumental, fusion, rock
- Length: 52:29
- Label: CyberOctave
- Producer: Stephen Perkins, Emit Bloch

Banyan chronology
Banyan (1997)	Anytime At All (1999)

Professional ratings
Review scores
Source	Rating
AllMusic	2/5 stars

Banyan is the debut album from Banyan. The record is dedicated to Marc Perkins. "They are compared to a deeply rooted Banyan tree which is ever increasing its hold on earth."

== Track listing ==
All songs written by Banyan.

1. "Baby Grace and the Indians" – 2:42
2. "People Find It Hard" – 3:39
3. "At the Blowhole" – 3:49
4. "Christmas Tree Park" – 11:35
5. "What's Left of Autumn" – 7:31
6. "Cooking for Now" – 3:06
7. "The Roots of Banyan" – 11:11
8. "A Good Looking Couple" – 9:26

== Personnel ==
Banyan

- Stephen Perkins – percussion
- Mike Watt – bass
- Nels Cline – guitar
- Money Mark – keyboards (listed as "The Freeway Keyboardist")
