= Recording Workshop =

The RecW
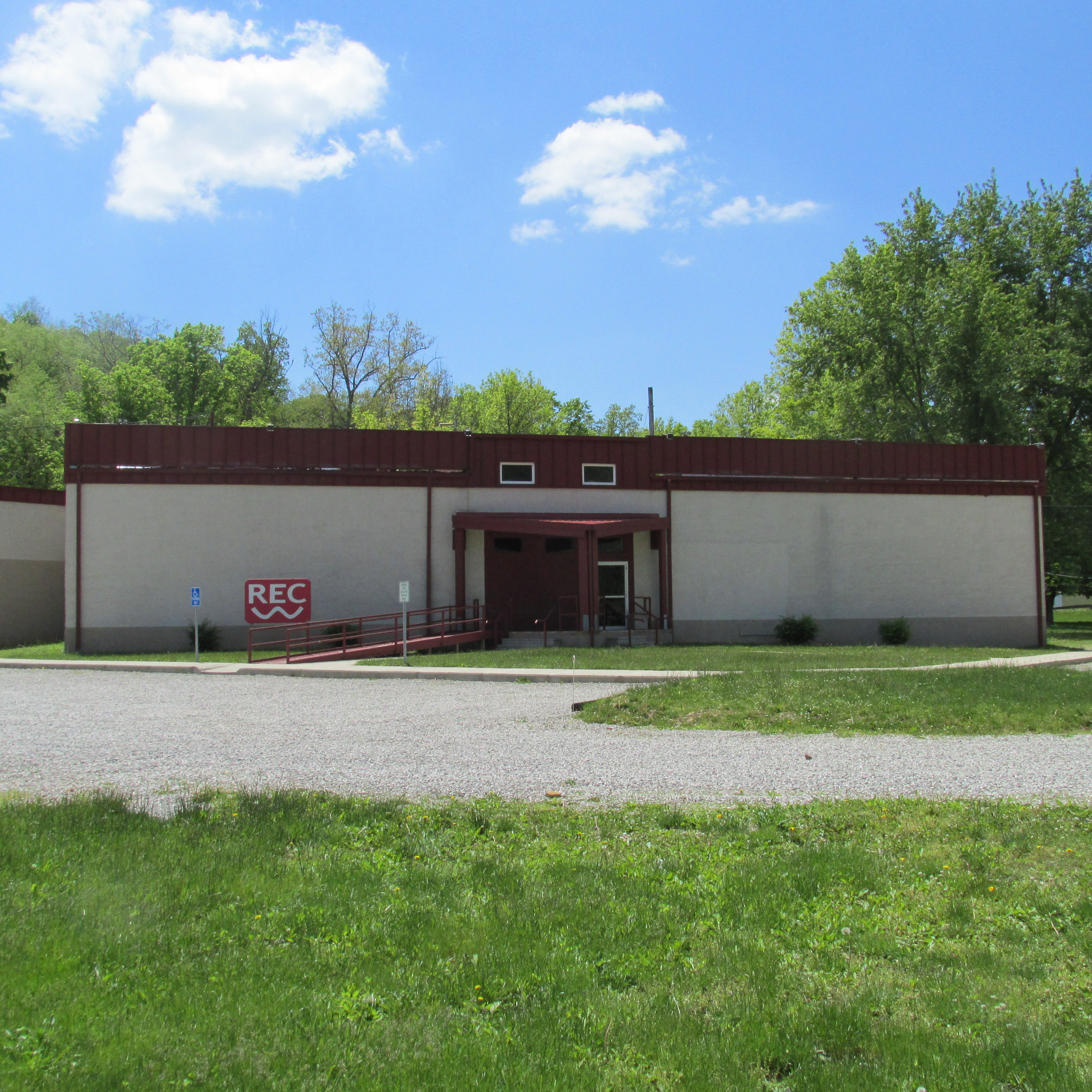

Location
- 455 Massieville Rd; Chillicothe, Ross County, Ohio 45601; United States
- Coordinates: 39°14′53″N 82°58′54″W

Information
- Founded: 1977
- Other Names: RECW
- Former Names: The Recording Workshop
- Website: www.TheRecW.com

Recording Workshop (RECW) is an advanced educational facility that teaches the process of music recording and audio production. It is located seven miles south of Chillicothe, Ohio, USA.

== History ==
Founded in 1977 as "The Recording Workshop", the school was associated with Appalachia Sound Recording Studio. Both entities originated with Joe Waters who had started the recording studio in 1971.

In 1987, Recording Workshop was recognized with a Mix magazine TEC Award Nomination as Outstanding Educational Institution.

Notable lecturers at Recording Workshop include:

- Roger Nichols

Notable graduates of Recording Workshop include:

- Jacquire King
- John Keane
- Thomas "TJ" Johnson
- Heba Kadry
- Jameil Aossey

== Current programs ==
The primary course offered by Recording Workshop is the "Music Recording & Audio Production CORE Program". This lasts five weeks and provides 180 hours of training. An extension course is the "Music Recording & Audio Production ADVANCED Program". This offers two additional weeks of training, adding 80 more hours of learning experience. Both programs are presented seven times per year.
