= Live at Perkins' Palace =

Studio album by Banyan
- Released: October 19, 2004
- Recorded: 2003–2004
- Genre: Instrumental, fusion, rock
- Length: 57 minutes
- Label: Sanctuary
- Producer: Stephen Perkins

Banyan chronology
Anytime At All (1999)	Live at Perkins' Palace (2004)

Professional ratings
Review scores
Source	Rating
Allmusic	link

Live at Perkins' Palace is the third record of Banyan, founded by Stephen Perkins. On this disc, Stephen decided to take the legion of musicians from Anytime At All and cut it down strictly to a quartet. Once again dedicated to Marc Perkins.

== Track listing ==
1. "Mad as a Hornet" (Stephen Perkins, William Waldman) – 5:44
2. "Oh My People" (Suliaman El-Hadi) – 5:09
3. "Om Om Om" (Mike Watt) – 3:44
4. "Only You Will Know" (Mike Watt) – 3:22
5. "El Sexxo" (Stephen Perkins, William Waldman) – 6:15
6. "Israelite" (Mike Watt) – 5:13
7. "A Million Little Laughs" (Mike Watt) – 3:35
8. "Uncle Mike" (Mike Watt) – 1:57
9. "King of Long Beach" (Nels Cline) – 5:39
10. "Rocks a Fallin'" (Stephen Perkins) – 2:01
11. "For E in E Minor" (Mike Watt) – 6:28
12. "Fun House" (The Stooges) – 8:37

== Players ==
- Stephen Perkins – Drums & Percussion
- Mike Watt – Bass
- Nels Cline – Guitar
- Willie Waldman – Trumpet
