= Porno for Pyros (album) =

Studio album by Porno for Pyros
- Released: April 27, 1993
- Recorded: Mid-1992
- Studio: Crystal Sound (Los Angeles)
- Genre: Alternative rock
- Length: 39:17
- Label: Warner Bros.
- Producer: Perry Farrell; Matt Hyde

Porno for Pyros chronology
Porno for Pyros (1993)	Good God's Urge (1996)

Singles from Porno for Pyros
- 1. "Cursed Female / Cursed Male" Released: 1993; 2. "Pets" Released: 1993; 3. "Meija" Released: 1993; 4. "Sadness" Released: 1994

Porno for Pyros is the debut studio album by the American alternative rock band Porno for Pyros, released on April 27, 1993, through Warner Bros. Records. Porno for Pyros emerged following the first break-up of Jane's Addiction, after the departures of guitarist Dave Navarro and bassist Eric Avery in 1991. The remaining Jane's Addiction members, Perry Farrell and Stephen Perkins, would form a new band the following year, joined by guitarist Peter DiStefano and future Jane's Addiction bassist Martyn LeNoble. The band (and album) name is a reference to the 1992 Los Angeles riots, which are mentioned throughout the songs on the album as a recurring theme.

The album was certified gold in the US by the Recording Industry Association of America (RIAA) and contains the No. 1 Modern Rock Tracks single "Pets".

== Music ==
Before the album's release, the musical direction and focus of the band and album were said to be "laid-back", "ethnic-influenced" and "edgy and experimental". Critics often compared the sound of Porno for Pyros to that of Jane's Addiction upon its release, noting many parallels in song structure and overall sound. Many of the songs on the album were written in Jane’s Addiction.

Such comparisons may be unavoidable; three of Porno for Pyros' founding four members (Farrell, Perkins and LeNoble) had either been past or future members of Jane's Addiction. In addition, a number of songs on Porno for Pyros, namely "Blood Rag" and "Bad Shit", were written during the pre-1992 Jane's Addiction period, although they would remain unfinished and unrecorded until the Porno for Pyros album.

The songs "Cursed Female" and "Cursed Male" were released as the album's first single. The songs appear on the album as two separate tracks. In addition to the two respective album versions, the single also included the two songs together in medley form as a single track. This medley was also released on the album's second (and highest charting) single, "Pets".

Another non-album B-side, "A Little Sadness", was released as a track on Porno for Pyros' fourth and final single, "Sadness". Recorded during the album sessions but left off in favor of its namesake, the song was a complete reworking and rerecording of "Sadness". "A Little Sadness" featured primarily acoustic guitars, subdued vocals, bongos and saxophone, a sharp contrast to its electric progenitor. In an unusual move, a video was created for the B-side rather than the album track.

"Porno for Pyros", "Packin' .25" and "Black Girlfriend" all referenced or were inspired by the 1992 Los Angeles riots.

== Critical reception ==
Professional ratings
Review scores
Source	Rating
AllMusic	3.5/5 stars
Robert Christgau	(dud)
Entertainment Weekly	B+
Los Angeles Times	3/4 stars
Rolling Stone	3/5 stars
The Rolling Stone Album Guide	2/5 stars

Newsday noted that "the playing is a little more minimalist than Jane's Addiction, with Perkins's percussion often spare and subtle (though prominent in the mix), while DiStefano's guitar is decidedly more earthbound than that of Jane's often adventurous David Navarro." Trouser Press opined that "the relentless stupidity of Farrell's wishfully scandalous dilettantism ... adds to the misery, but that’s nothing new for him." The New York Times wrote that "songs jump from drifting ballad to wah-wah funk to blaring power chords, from bluesy rock to Perkins's hard-rock version of Latin rhythms... The volatile, turbulent music scrabbles at emotions that rock rarely touches."

== Track listing ==
All tracks are written by Porno for Pyros.

No.	Title	Length
1.	"Sadness"	2:33
2.	"Porno for Pyros"	3:06
3.	"Meija"	3:13
4.	"Cursed Female"	3:24
5.	"Cursed Male"	3:50
6.	"Pets"	3:36
7.	"Bad Shit"	2:58
8.	"Packin' .25"	4:08
9.	"Black Girlfriend"	4:33
10.	"Blood Rag"	3:29
11.	"Orgasm"	4:27
Total length:		39:17

== Personnel ==
Porno for Pyros

- Perry Farrell – vocals
- Peter DiStefano – guitars
- Martyn LeNoble – bass
- Stephen Perkins – drums, percussion

Additional personnel

- Skatemaster Tate – sound additives
- Matt Hyde – sound additives

Technical

- Matt Hyde – production, recording engineer, mixing
- Perry Farrell – production
- Rob Seifert – recording engineer
- Damien Wagner – assistant recording engineer
- Chris Bellman – mastering

Artwork

- Tom Recchion – art direction, design
- Bill Hofstadter – artwork, photography
- Perry Farrell – artwork
- Barrie Goshko – lettering
- Cecil Juanarena – computer imaging

== Charts ==
Chart (1993)	Peak position
Australian Albums (ARIA)	35
New Zealand Albums (RMNZ)	16
UK Albums (OCC)	13
US Billboard 200	3

== Certifications ==
Region	Certification	Certified units/sales
Canada (Music Canada)	Gold	50,000^{^}
United States (RIAA)	Gold	500,000^{^}
^{^} Shipments figures based on certification alone.
