= Peter DiStefano =

American guitarist and songwriter

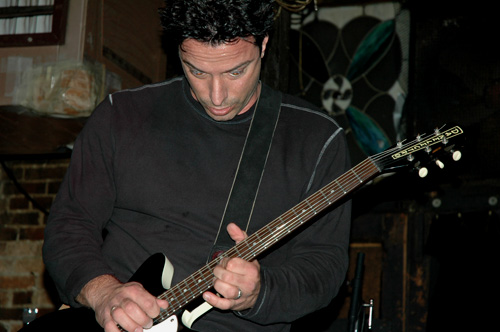
- Peter DiStefano in 2006

Background information
- Born: July 10, 1965 (age 61); Santa Monica, California, U.S.
- Genre: Rock
- Occupations: Musician, composer, producer, guitarist
- Instruments: Guitar; vocals
- Years active: 1984–present
- Labels: Warner Bros., Sanctuary Records, Lonely Seal Releasing
- Website: www.peterdistefano.com

Peter DiStefano (born July 10, 1965, in Santa Monica, California, U.S.) is an American guitarist and songwriter, best known for his work in the alternative rock band Porno for Pyros (the Jane's Addiction offshoot featuring vocalist Perry Farrell and drummer Stephen Perkins).

== Music career ==
DiStefano's earliest band, K-38, released a single, "For Those Who Listen", in 1986.

He formed Porno for Pyros in 1992 with Farrell, Perkins and bassist Martyn LeNoble. During their successful five-year run, the band's eponymous first album hit No. 3 on the Billboard 200, earning gold. In 1997, the band went on hiatus after DiStefano was diagnosed with testicular cancer.

DiStefano recovered from cancer and heroin addiction in July 1997. He later independently released the solo albums Gratitude in 2004 on Sanctuary Records, and Loyalty in 2007 on Lonely Seal Releasing, and several additional self-released recordings. DiStefano went on to compose music for film, television and video games.

As a duo called Rambient, DiStefano and British composer Harry Gregson-Williams released the So Many Worlds album in 2001. DiStefano then served as the studio guitarist for many of Gregson-Williams's film scores, including Man on Fire (2004), The Chronicles of Narnia: The Lion, the Witch and the Wardrobe (2005), Déjà Vu (2006), Shrek the Third (2007), Gone Baby Gone (2007) and The Chronicles of Narnia: Prince Caspian (2008).

Other musical pursuits included an electronica-oriented project called Venice Underground (who issued an album in 2000), and collaborations with Stone Temple Pilots vocalist Scott Weiland (on the 1998 album 12 Bar Blues), Bauhaus vocalist Peter Murphy (on the 2004 album Unshattered) and the band Hybrid (on the 2006 album I Choose Noise).

DiStefano has appeared at Lollapalooza with Farrell every year since the start of the festival. At the Jane's Addiction 2012 Lollapalooza after-party at the Aragon Ballroom, he performed with the band, playing lead guitar on the Porno for Pyros song "Cursed Female".

In 2011, DiStefano co-founded the band Lance Herbstrong, performing on their subsequent self-released albums (Toklahoma, Meth Breakfast and The Knobturner's Guild) and tours. In 2015, he started the company All Edge Music.

In 2025, he joined The Psychedelic Furs as a second guitarist.

== Discography ==
=== Studio albums ===
- Gratitude (2004, Sanctuary Records)
- Soul Trigger (2005, Sanctuary)
- Integrity (2006, Pete12Tone)
- Loyalty (2007, Lonely Seal Releasing)
- Order of the Dragon (2008, Zota Soda)
- Unconditional (2009, Distefano and the circle)
- Alternative Violence (2010, National Heroine)
- 2012
- Pete 8 (2013)
- Aware (2014)

=== With K-38 ===
- "For Those Who Listen" 7" (1986, Chavooo Records)

=== With Porno for Pyros ===
- Porno for Pyros (1993, Warner Bros.) U.S. No. 3
- Good God's Urge (1996, Warner Bros.) U.S. No. 13

=== With Venice Underground ===
- Venice Underground (2000, 5.1 Entertainment Group)

=== With Rambient ===
- So Many Worlds (2001, Immergent)

=== With Lance Herbstrong ===
- Toklahoma (2011, self-released)
- Meth Breakfast (2012, self-released)
- The Knobturner's Guild (2011, self-released)
