= Good God's Urge =

Studio album by Porno for Pyros
- Released: May 28, 1996
- Studio: Shangri-La (Malibu, California)
- Genre: Alternative rock
- Length: 38:22
- Label: Warner Bros.
- Producer: Perry Farrell; Thomas Johnson; Matt Hyde

Porno for Pyros chronology
Porno for Pyros (1993)	Good God's Urge (1996)

Singles from Good God's Urge
- 1. "Tahitian Moon" Released: May 1996; 2. "100 Ways" Released: 1996; 3. "Dogs Rule the Night" Released: 1996

Good God's Urge is the second and final studio album by American alternative rock band Porno for Pyros. It was released on May 28, 1996, through Warner Bros. Records. It is the band's first (and only) album to feature bass guitarist Mike Watt, who assisted the band in finishing the record after Martyn LeNoble left before all his bass tracks had been completed. There were three singles released from the album.

In addition to Watt, many guest musicians lent their musical talents to various songs. "Porpoise Head" featured Daniel Ash, David J and Kevin Haskins from Bauhaus, Love and Rockets and the Bubblemen. Good God's Urge also marked a reunion of ex-Jane's Addiction guitarist Dave Navarro, who played guitar on the album track "Freeway." The song also featured Navarro's Red Hot Chili Peppers bandmate, Flea.

Farrell's then-girlfriend, Christine Cagle, appeared on the album cover. Photographer John Eder described the photoshoot as "increasingly chaotic and weird", and said the cover was one of the last shots of the night.

The album was devised over a two-year "surf trip" that saw the band visiting places like Tahiti, Indonesia, Samoa, Costa Rica, and Mexico, leading to a more acoustic and less hard rock sound. The trips doubled as occasions for the band to detox from their severe drug addictions, which informed the lyrics of songs like "Porpoise Head" and "Tahitian Moon". Recording took place at Shangri-La in Malibu, California.

LeNoble left the band before recording completed due to drug addiction and clashes with Farrell, who was growing increasingly paranoid from crack cocaine use. LeNoble was frustrated with the business structure of Porno for Pyros, set up as a company with Farrell as the sole owner, thus depriving the other band members of publishing rights. LeNoble was hospitalised after he left due to the severity of his drug addiction.

Porno for Pyros went on a hiatus shortly after the tour (featuring Watt on bass) promoting the album's release due to guitarist Peter DiStefano's cancer diagnosis. They were set to reform in 2019 to perform at singer Farrell's birthday celebration, but those plans were scrapped due to the COVID-19 pandemic. The Good God's Urge-era lineup of Farrell, DiStefano, Perkins, and Watt performed in 2020 as part of a Lollapalooza webcast, and in 2022 as part of the Welcome to Rockville festival.

== Critical reception ==
Professional ratings
Review scores
Source	Rating
AllMusic	4/5 stars
The Encyclopedia of Popular Music	3/5 stars
Entertainment Weekly	C−
MusicHound Rock: The Essential Album Guide	3/5 stars
NME	8/10
Rolling Stone	3/5 stars
The Rolling Stone Album Guide	3/5 stars
Spin	6/10

Trouser Press wrote that "while he helpfully turns the attack down to an alluringly cool semi-acoustic breeze on parts of Good God’s Urge, Farrell can’t improve his obnoxious personality, which renders the album another love-it/hate-it proposition." The New York Times wrote that "the music gets atmospheric, experimental and interesting." CMJ New Music Monthly called the record "more pleasantly stoned than the first album."

== Track listing ==
All lyrics are written by Perry Farrell; all music is composed by Porno for Pyros.

No.	Title	Length
1.	"Porpoise Head"	4:15
2.	"100 Ways"	3:42
3.	"Tahitian Moon"	3:47
4.	"Kimberly Austin"	3:13
5.	"Thick of It All"	4:43
6.	"Good God's://Urge!"	3:52
7.	"Wishing Well"	3:40
8.	"Dogs Rule the Night"	3:22
9.	"Freeway"	4:23
10.	"Bali Eyes"	3:28

Japanese bonus track
No.	Title	Length
11.	"Dominator"	2:43

== Personnel ==
=== Band ===
- Perry Farrell: Vocals, percussion, samples, harp, keyboards
- Peter DiStefano: Guitars, samples, backing vocals
- Martyn LeNoble: Bass (tracks 3, 4, 5, 7, 8, 10)
- Stephen Perkins: Drums, percussion, samples, backing vocals

=== Additional musicians ===
- Thomas Johnson: Samples and sounds, keyboards (track 2)
- David J: Bass (1)
- Mike Watt: Bass (2, 6)
- Flea: Bass (9)
- Daniel Ash: Guitar (1)
- Kevin Haskins: Samples (1)
- Dave Navarro: Guitar intro (9)
- Matt Hyde: Intro slide guitar (3), samples (8), slide guitar (10)
- Lili Haydn: Violin (2)
- Ralf Rickert: Trumpet (2)
- Leo Chelyapov: Clarinet (7)
- John Flannery: Space guitar intro and chorus (9), backing vocals and trash can (6)
- Josh "Bagel" Klassman: Backing vocals (9)
- Christine Cagle: Backing vocals (6, 9)
- Shawn London: Backing Vocals (6)
- Kimberly Juarez: Backing Vocals (2)

=== Production ===
- Dave Collins: mastering
- John Eder: photography

== Charts ==
Chart performance for Good God's Urge
Chart (1996)	Peak position
Australian Albums (ARIA)	20
New Zealand Albums (RMNZ)	20
Norwegian Albums (VG-lista)	18
Swedish Albums (Sverigetopplistan)	57
UK Albums (OCC)	40
US Billboard 200	13
