= Song Yet to Be Sung =

Studio album by Perry Farrell
- Released: July 16, 2001
- Genre: Alternative rock, electronica
- Label: Virgin
- Producer: Perry Farrell, Krish Sharma, Brendan Hawkins, Marius de Vries, Mad Professor, Karl Leiker

Perry Farrell chronology
| Rev (1999) | Song Yet to Be Sung (2001) | Kind Heaven (2019) |

Professional ratings
Review scores
| Source | Rating |
|---|---|
| Kerrang! | 2/5 stars |

Song Yet to Be Sung is the debut studio album by Jane's Addiction vocalist Perry Farrell, released on July 16, 2001, on Virgin Records.

Originally titled The Diamond Jubilee, it features collaborations from Farrell's bandmates Dave Navarro, Stephen Perkins and Martyn LeNoble. The title track was the official song in trailers for the series premiere of the television show Smallville.

== Track listing ==
1. "Happy Birthday Jubilee" - 4:39
2. "Song Yet to Be Sung" - 4:54
3. "Did You Forget" - 4:10
4. "Shekina" - 4:53
5. "Our Song" - 4:21
6. "Say Something" - 3:45
7. "Seeds" - 3:48
8. "King Z" - 3:31
9. "To Me" - 2:59
10. "Nua Nua" - 4:37
11. "Admit I" - 4:23
12. "Happy Birthday Jubilee (reprise) - 2:40
