= Perry Farrell =

American singer-songwriter and musician (born 1959)

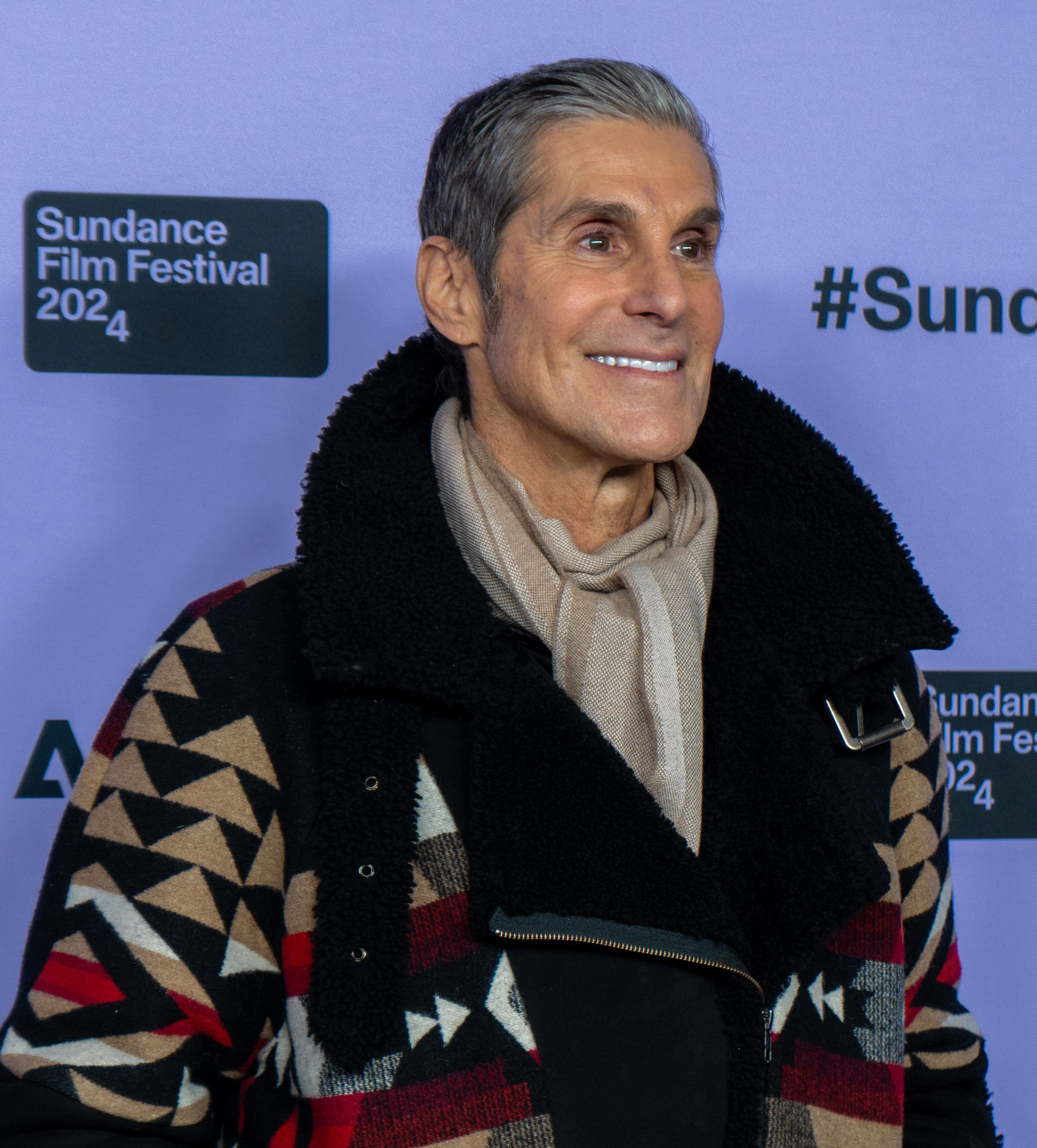
- Farrell in January 2024
- Born: Peretz Bernstein; March 29, 1959 (age 67); New York City, U.S.
- Occupations: Singer; songwriter; musician; DJ
- Years active: 1981–present
- Spouse: Etty Lau (m. 2002)
- Children: 3
- Musical career
- Also known as: DJ Peretz
- Genres: Alternative rock; hard rock; electronica
- Instruments: Vocals; keyboards; harmonica
- Labels: Warner Bros.; EMI/Capitol; Columbia
- Formerly of: Jane's Addiction; Porno for Pyros; Psi Com; Satellite Party; PerryEtty vs Chris Cox

Perry Farrell (born Peretz Bernstein; March 29, 1959) is an American singer, songwriter, and musician. Farrell began his career with Psi Com in the early 1980s, before becoming the frontman of the band Jane's Addiction. Jane's Addiction quickly became a key act in the '80s Los Angeles music scene, blending punk, metal, and psychedelic rock to create a unique sound. Their daring live performances and experimental approach resonated with disillusioned youth, contributing to the rise of alternative music as a form of rebellion and self-expression, leading Farrell to be referred to as the "Godfather of Alternative Music".

As part of the farewell tour for Jane's Addiction in 1991, Farrell founded Lollapalooza, which has evolved into an annual festival of multiple genres. Farrell is also the frontman of Porno for Pyros.

Farrell has also released a number of solo albums, and also launched a number of other music-related projects, including Kind Heaven Orchestra, Satellite Party and Heaven After Dark.

== Early life ==
Peretz Bernstein was born in the Queens borough of New York City on March 29, 1959. He was raised in a Jewish family, his mother was an artist and his father was a jeweler. When Farrell was three, his mother died by suicide, an event which he later wrote about in Jane's Addiction songs "Then She Did" and "Twisted Tales". In an interview with The Guardian, Farrell spoke of his mother's suicide, saying, "I remember it, yeah. There are some things that have deep-seated emotions for me, but you can't change it and you move on. I think it has a huge part in my appreciation for life, for sure." He spent his grade-school years in Woodmere, Long Island, before his family relocated to Florida.

Farrell's family moved to North Miami Beach, Florida when he was a teenager. At the age of seventeen, after graduating from high school, Farrell wanted adventure in his life and decided to travel by bus to California. Aside from some belongings, Farrell took a surfboard, art materials and some marijuana. He stated in interviews since that he really wanted to focus on surfing, but had at that point in his life also started taking an interest in music with influences from the Beatles, the Rolling Stones, Led Zeppelin, Sly and the Family Stone and James Brown.

He spent time as a club singer for a short period in the early 1980s while living in Los Angeles. Farrell also stated that he worked construction, waited tables and spent some of his time in LA living in his car. While living in California, he began listening to David Bowie, Iggy Pop and Lou Reed.

== Music career ==
=== 1981–1991: Psi Com and founding Jane's Addiction ===
In the early 1980s, Farrell was living in LA and noticed an ad in a local magazine. It had been placed by Vince Duran and Aaron Sherer, who were looking for a drummer for their band. Following discussions, it was agreed Farrell would become the lead singer and frontman for the post-punk, goth rock band, Psi Com. At the time, they mixed with a number of upcoming bands from California, including X, Red Hot Chili Peppers, Fishbone, Oingo Boingo, and the Minutemen. While performing with Psi Com, it was the first time the pseudonym Perry Farrell was used by Bernstein, since it was a play on the word "peripheral".

Psi Com disbanded in late 1985. Farrell had previously met guitarist Eric Avery through mutual friends. Avery was classmates with both drummer Stephen Perkins and Dave Navarro. Avery and Farrell decided to jam together, forming the initial foundation for Jane's Addiction. Perkins was invited to join, followed by Navarro.

Jane's Addiction became popular in the mid-1980s, starting in LA and then across the United States. They built a fan base with high-energy shows in small venues across Los Angeles. The band released three albums in quick succession, Jane's Addiction, Nothing's Shocking and Ritual de lo Habitual. A B-sides album from the Ritual sessions, titled Live and Rare, was released in Japan. In late 1991, Jane's Addiction announced they were splitting. Numerous reasons and rumours circulated including Farrell's battle with addiction, but also many baseless rumors. Once the rumours died down, it became evident Farrell and Avery had different visions on the band's progression.

=== 1992–1999: Porno for Pyros, solo music and Jane's Addiction reunion ===
Shortly after Jane's Addiction split up, Farrell and drummer Stephen Perkins formed Porno for Pyros. Guitarist Peter DiStefano and bass player Martyn LeNoble completed the original four members of the band. Porno for Pyros undertook a huge North American tour in 1992, prior to the release of their eponymous first album. The album was eventually released in 1993, with demand for new music from the band pushing the album to the No. 3 position on the Billboard top 200 list. The video for the album's second single, "Pets", received heavy airplay on MTV. Following the album's release, Porno for Pyros continued a heavy touring schedule, including an appearance at Woodstock '94 along with a cameo on HBO's The Larry Sanders Show. Unlike the relatively straight-ahead rock shows that were the hallmark of live Jane's Addiction, Porno for Pyros live shows relied heavily on props and special effects (including pyrotechnics).

In 1997, Jane's Addiction reformed for a brief reunion tour with Flea replacing Avery on bass. Kicking off his solo career, Farrell released rev in 1999, a compilation featuring songs from his previous two bands as well as two new solo songs.

=== 2000–2008: Jane's Addiction new music and Satellite Party ===
In 2001, he released his debut solo album, Song Yet to Be Sung, with lyrics inspired by Kabbalah. Farrell again toured with Jane's Addiction later that year. He has been credited with changing the fortunes of the Coachella Valley Music and Arts Festival, after performing in 2001. Coachella's first year in 1999 was considered a disaster, which led to the event not being held in 2000. In 2001, a decision was made to organize the festival again, but just a few months before the festival was set to occur, there was still no headlining group. Farrell, who was friends with the festival organizers, decided to reunite Jane's Addiction for the 2001 event, which helped draw large crowds and allowed the festival to yield a profit (which was not the case in 1999). This began a Coachella tradition of reuniting at least one major act each year.

In 2003, Jane's Addiction released an album, Strays. It quickly became one of their best selling records and was certified Gold in the USA and Silver in UK. They toured extensively in North America and Europe, brought back Lollapalooza for the first time since 1997, as well as performing at the Big Day Out festivals in Australia and New Zealand. Internal struggles saw the band split up again in early 2004. A "best of" release following the breakup of this incarnation of the band was released in 2006, titled Up from the Catacombs.

Farrell formed a new band/theatrical entity entitled Satellite Party. Satellite Party is a concept album and is the story of a fictional band of musicians called the Solutionists who are trying to change the world. Farrell conceived the project with his wife Etty Lau Farrell. Etty sings and plays her part on the record as well as the live stage shows. Satellite Party made its debut in Los Angeles at The Key Club on July 18, 2005, followed by a performance at Lollapalooza 2005, held in Grant Park in downtown Chicago on July 24, 2005.

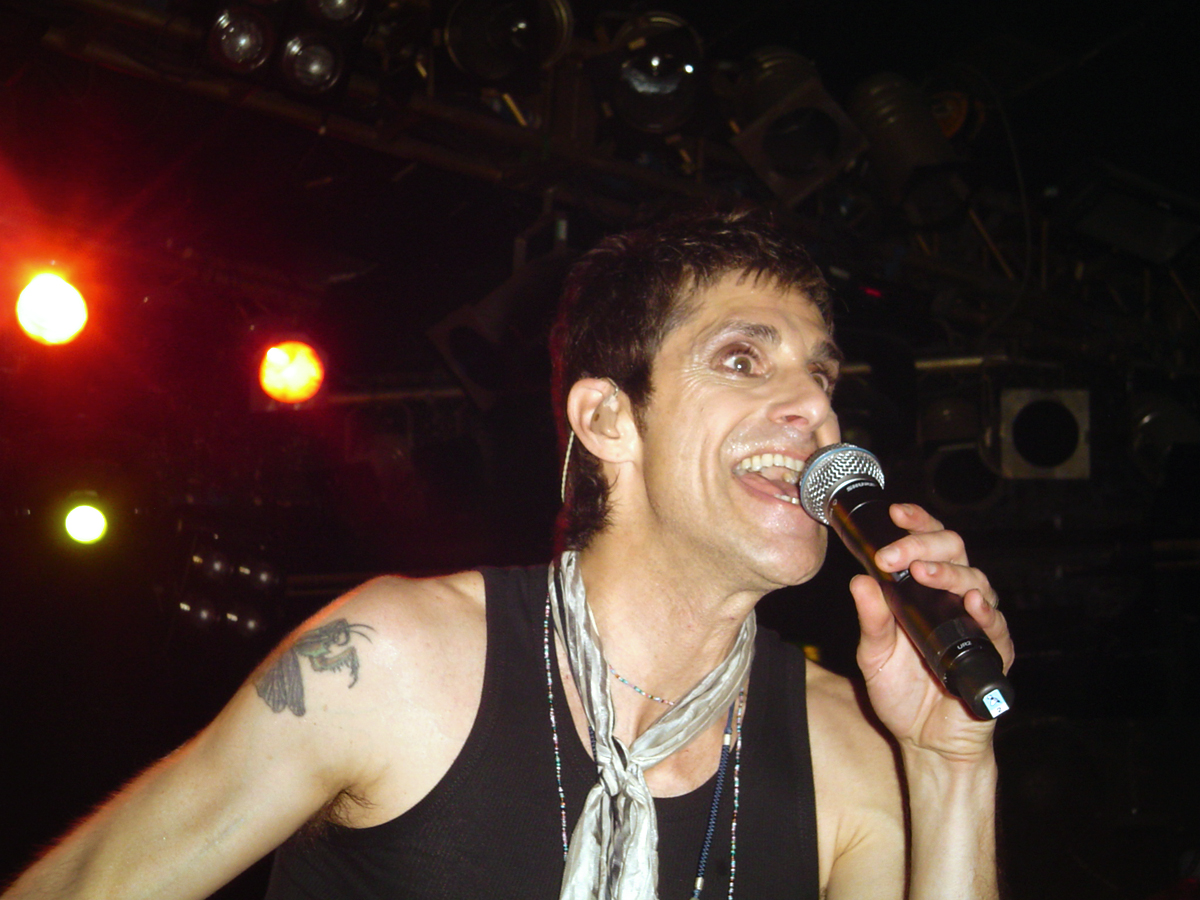
Farrell performing at the London Astoria in June 2007

Their debut album, Ultra Payloaded, was released on May 29, 2007, on Columbia Records, with contributions from artists such as John Frusciante and Flea of the Red Hot Chili Peppers, electronic dance producers Hybrid, former Red Hot Chili Peppers/Pearl Jam drummer Jack Irons, Joy Division/New Order bassist Peter Hook, and Fergie of the Black Eyed Peas.

Satellite Party performed at the Coachella Valley Music and Arts Festival on April 27, 2007. On June 8 they performed at the Download Festival at Donington, UK. On June 29 they performed alongside Pearl Jam, Kings of Leon and Queens of the Stone Age at Rock Werchter, Belgium. They performed at Buzz Beach Ball 3 in Kansas City (a concert sponsored by KRBZ), and EndFest 16 in Seattle.

The four original members of Jane's Addiction played their first show together in 17 years at the first United States edition of the NME Awards on April 23, 2008, and played two small shows in Los Angeles during late 2008. Farrell has released a number of solo tracks online, all of them recorded with the involvement of wife Etty Lau. Their song "Go All the Way (Into the Twilight)" appeared on the Twilight film soundtrack.

=== 2009–present: Recent career, Kind Heaven Orchestra, and Jane's Addiction lawsuit ===
The reunited Jane's Addiction re-debuted at SXSW in 2009 and kicked off a summer tour with Nine Inch Nails. Avery again left the band in late 2009, leaving Farrell, Navarro and Perkins as the remaining members of Jane's Addiction. The band with Dave Sitek on bass released The Great Escape Artist in 2011 and have continued to tour.

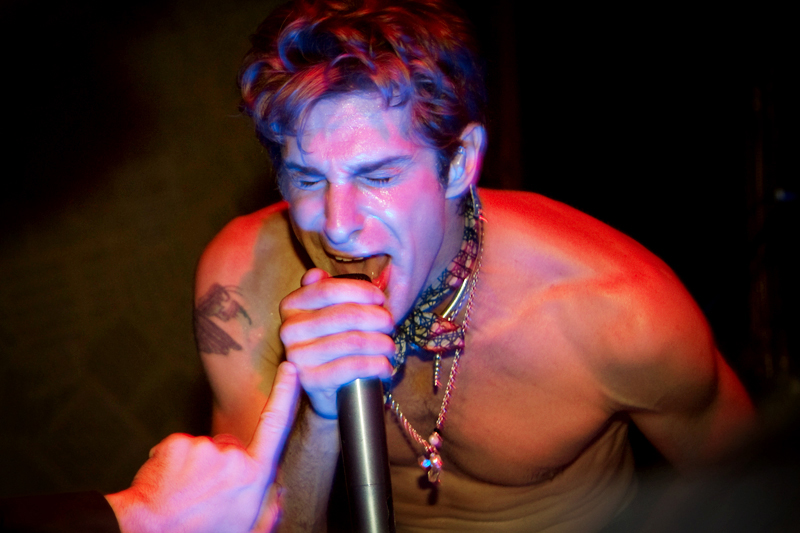
Perry Farrell with Jane's Addiction December 3, 2009

In 2018, Farrell announced that he would be the frontman for a new music project, the Kind Heaven Orchestra. Farrell's wife Etty Farrell was on backing vocals, Matt Chamberlain of Pearl Jam, Chris Cheney and keyboardist Matt Rohde from Jane's Addiction also part of the lineup. Kind Heaven Orchestra debuted at the first ever Bill Graham Festival of Lights.

In October 2018, Farrell signed with BMG Rights Management, which released his second studio album Kind Heaven in 2019. The demand for new music by Farrell led to the album reaching 2nd position in the Heatseekers album chart. Metacritic gave the album an aggregate score of 70, meaning the album generally received positive reviews.

In 2020, Jane's Addiction reformed after a three year hiatus to perform at Lollapalooza that year. When asked if we could expect a new album from Jane's Addiction, Farrell stated "I wouldn't think albums, I'd think songs. We've got so much Jane's material in the can. We'll be releasing a couple of tracks, maybe writing some new ones."

In February 2022, Farrell launched Heaven After Dark; each event combines music and sensation, visual stimulation, and supports the nurture of up-and-coming artists. Later that year, Heaven After Dark expanded to become its own record label where artists are treated more fairly than traditional models. The label has since gone on to release "Turn Over The World" (Idles remix), Etty Lau Farrell's "He's A Rebel" Pink Panda Remix (The Crystal's number 1 single), "Telling Stories" and "Until The Night Fades", which was a collaboration between Etty Lau Farrell and award-winning English producer and DJ Hyper in 2023.

In May 2022, Farrell announced he would be releasing a new single titled "Mend", with Kind Heaven Orchestra. During the same month, Jane's Addiction had to pull out of performing at Welcome to Rockville after Dave Navarro contracted COVID-19. Farrell said on Welcome to Rockville's Facebook page that Porno for Pyros would be reuniting for the first time in 26 years.

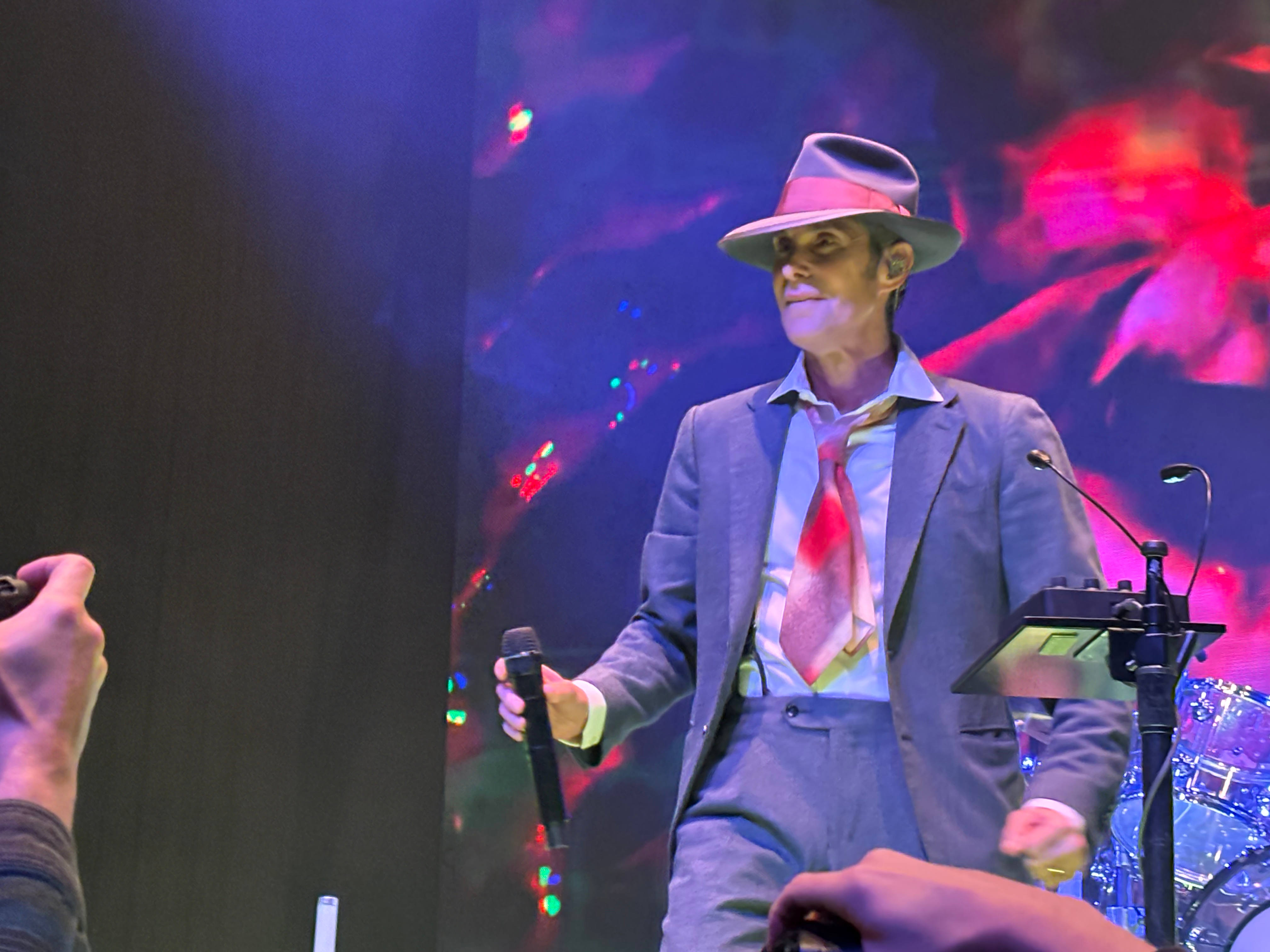
Perry Farrell performs with Porno for Pyros on March 10, 2024 at the Wellmont Theatre in Montclair, NJ.

On September 13, 2024, a concert of Jane's Addiction at Leader Bank Pavilion in Boston was cut short after Farrell shoved and punched Navarro and was restrained by crew members. Farrell's wife, Etty Lau Farrell, said Farrell had been suffering from tinnitus and a sore throat and felt his voice was being drowned out by the band. Farrell allegedly assaulted Navarro a second time backstage. The following day, Jane's Addiction issued an apology and canceled their scheduled show at Bridgeport, Connecticut. On September 16, they canceled the remainder of the tour and said they would "take some time away as a group". Navarro, Avery and Perkins released a joint statement attributing the cancellation to Farrell's behavior and mental health, while Farrell released an apology, saying his behavior was "inexcusable". The band later announced in January 2025 that they would be continuing without Farrell before subsequently confirming that Jane's Addiction would not continue.

On July 16, 2025, Avery, Navarro, and Perkins filed a lawsuit against Farrell accusing him of assault, battery, intentional infliction of emotional distress, negligence, breach of fiduciary duty, and breach of contract. The lawsuit also alleges that the group lost over $10 million as a result of the tour's cancellation and cessation of all band activities including the first studio album with the classic lineup since 1990. The three members are also asking Farrell to pay all of the group's outstanding bills stemming from the tour’s cancellation. Farrell subsequently filed his own lawsuit against Avery, Navarro, and Perkins, accusing his bandmates of bullying, assault and battery, and for "harassing him onstage during performances" which allegedly included "playing their instruments at a high volume so that he could not hear himself sing without blasting his own in-ear monitors at an unsafe level." Farrell also seeks damages for libel, claiming that the other members inaccurately described him in the media as suffering from poor mental health and alcoholism.

By December 2025, the remaining members of Jane's Addiction mended their differences with Farrell, but reiterated that the band would not continue. On July 16, 2026, Farrell joined Japanese musician and composer Yoshiki on stage at Walt Disney Concert Hall to perform a cover of 10cc's "I'm Not in Love".

== Lollapalooza ==
In 1991, Farrell created Lollapalooza, initially as the farewell tour for Jane's Addiction. It has since become a defining cultural event for alternative music enthusiasts worldwide, showcasing diverse talents and fostering a global community of music and art lovers. Lollapalooza has also become a platform for social change, encouraging activism and environmental consciousness. The festival has since expanded into eight territories around the world including Chicago, Chile, Argentina, Brazil, Germany, France, Sweden and India.

=== Kidzapalooza ===
In 2005, music producer Tor Hyams approached Farrell with the idea of creating a kids' stage with family-friendly fare at Lollapalooza. Kidzapalooza came to be that year, produced by Hyams and continues to this day with guests like Slash, Patti Smith and LeAnn Rimes appearing in the lineup of artists.

=== PurimPalooza 2006 ===
In 2006, Farrell performed at Purimpalooza, which celebrates the Jewish holiday of Purim. It was a concert for all ages and presented different Jewish musical groups. It took place in Ruby Skye in San Francisco, and featured bands including Moshav, Chutzpah, and Matisyahu.

== Work outside music ==
Farrell has also made a docudrama titled Gift released in 1993 which featured various songs by Farrell and included Farrell's then-girlfriend Casey Niccoli. Gift was released to VHS home video by Warner Bros but never released to DVD.

He joined forces with Tom Morello and his Axis of Justice tour to raise money for the homeless in Los Angeles and together they physically removed debris in the Ninth Ward of New Orleans in the aftermath of Hurricane Katrina to assist local musicians. They also fund-raised for Road Recovery, a New York non-profit organization which helps young people battling with addiction and other adversities.

Farrell is an environmentalist. He met British prime minister Tony Blair at 10 Downing Street on January 31, 2007, to discuss global warming. He presented Blair with a CD of the Satellite Party track "Woman in the Window".

He worked with Global Cool in 2007 to help promote green living.

Farrell has worked to bring music festivals to Israel, including Lollapalooza, and Jane's Addiction themselves have performed in Israel. "Lollapalooza Israel" was to take place in Tel Aviv’s Yarkon Park on August 20-22, 2013. However, the event fell through, with the organizers citing financial concerns and lack of talent willing to perform in Israel. In 2009, Farrell sang at a "benefit for victims of terror and a solidarity event for Israel", an invitation-only party named "Stand with Israel" and held at 7 World Trade Center (which is by Ground Zero in New York City), alongside Alan Dershowitz and Jared Kushner.

== Personal life ==
Farrell met his wife, Etty Lau Farrell, while touring with Jane's Addiction; she was a backing dancer on the tour in 1997. They married in 2002. Farrell has three children, two with his wife and one from a previous relationship.

== Discography ==
Psi Com

- 1985 Psi Com EP

Jane's Addiction

- 1987 Jane's Addiction
- 1988 Nothing's Shocking
- 1990 Ritual de lo Habitual
- 1991 Live and Rare (Compilation of B-Sides and the remix of "Been Caught Stealing")
- 1997 Kettle Whistle (compilation of live tracks, demos and unreleased material)
- 2003 Strays
- 2006 Up from the Catacombs (greatest hits album)
- 2009 A Cabinet of Curiosities (box set)
- 2011 The Great Escape Artist

Porno for Pyros

- 1993 Porno for Pyros
- 1996 Good God's Urge

Solo

- 1999 Rev (Compilation)
- 2001 Song Yet to Be Sung
- 2019 Kind Heaven
- 2021 The Glitz; The Glamour (box set)

Satellite Party

- 2007 Ultra Payloaded

Miscellaneous musical appearances and collaborations

- Sampled on the track "Ringfinger" on the Nine Inch Nails album Pretty Hate Machine (1989).
- Featured on the track "Ripple" on a tribute/environmental benefit to the Grateful Dead called Deadicated (1991).
- Contributed vocals to the song "Hot Lava" on Chef Aid: The South Park Album (1998).
- Contributed vocals to the song "Children of Night" along with Exene Cervenka for the Doors tribute album Stoned Immaculate: The Music of the Doors (2000).
- Featured on the track "King Z" on Mad Professor's "best of" album Method to the Madness (2005).
- Featured on the track "Time of your Life" on Paul Oakenfold's album Bunkka (2002).
- Contributed vocals to the song "The Patience Bossa" along with Debbie Harry for the compilation album A World of Happiness (2004).
- Featured on the track "Revolution Solution" on Thievery Corporation's album The Cosmic Game (2005).
- Featured on the track "Dogstar" on Hybrid's album I Choose Noise (2006).
- Featured on the track "Shake My Shit" on the Nightwatchman's album The Fabled City (2008).
- Contributed the song "Go All the Way (Into the Twilight)" to the Twilight soundtrack (2008).
- Contributed the song "Nasty Little Perv" to NCIS: The Official TV Soundtrack (2009).
- Contributed the song "New Moon" to the compilation album A World of Happiness (2009 re-release only).
- Contributed vocals to the song "Killing Time" on Infected Mushroom's album Legend of the Black Shawarma (2009).
- Featured on the track "Honey If You Love Him" on Erasure singer Andy Bell's album Non-Stop (2010).
- Featured on the track "Blink" on the Zed's Dead's album Somewhere Else (2014).
- Featured on the track "Got to Get You into My Life" on the Paul McCartney tribute album The Art of McCartney (2014).
- Featured on the tracks "I Got a Line on You" and "One/Jump into the Fire" on the self-titled album from the supergroup Hollywood Vampires (2015).
- Featured on the track "I Really Blew It" on the Taylor Hawkins and the Coattail Riders album Get the Money (2019).
- Featured on the track "Rock On" on the Marc Bolan tribute album AngelHeaded Hipster: The Songs Of Marc Bolan & T. Rex (2020).
- Featured on the track "Oh the Sunn!" on the Avalanches album We Will Always Love You (2020)
- Featured on the track "So Trendy" with Sleaford Mods on the album UK Grim (2023)
