= Stephen Perkins =

American musician and songwriter (born 1967)

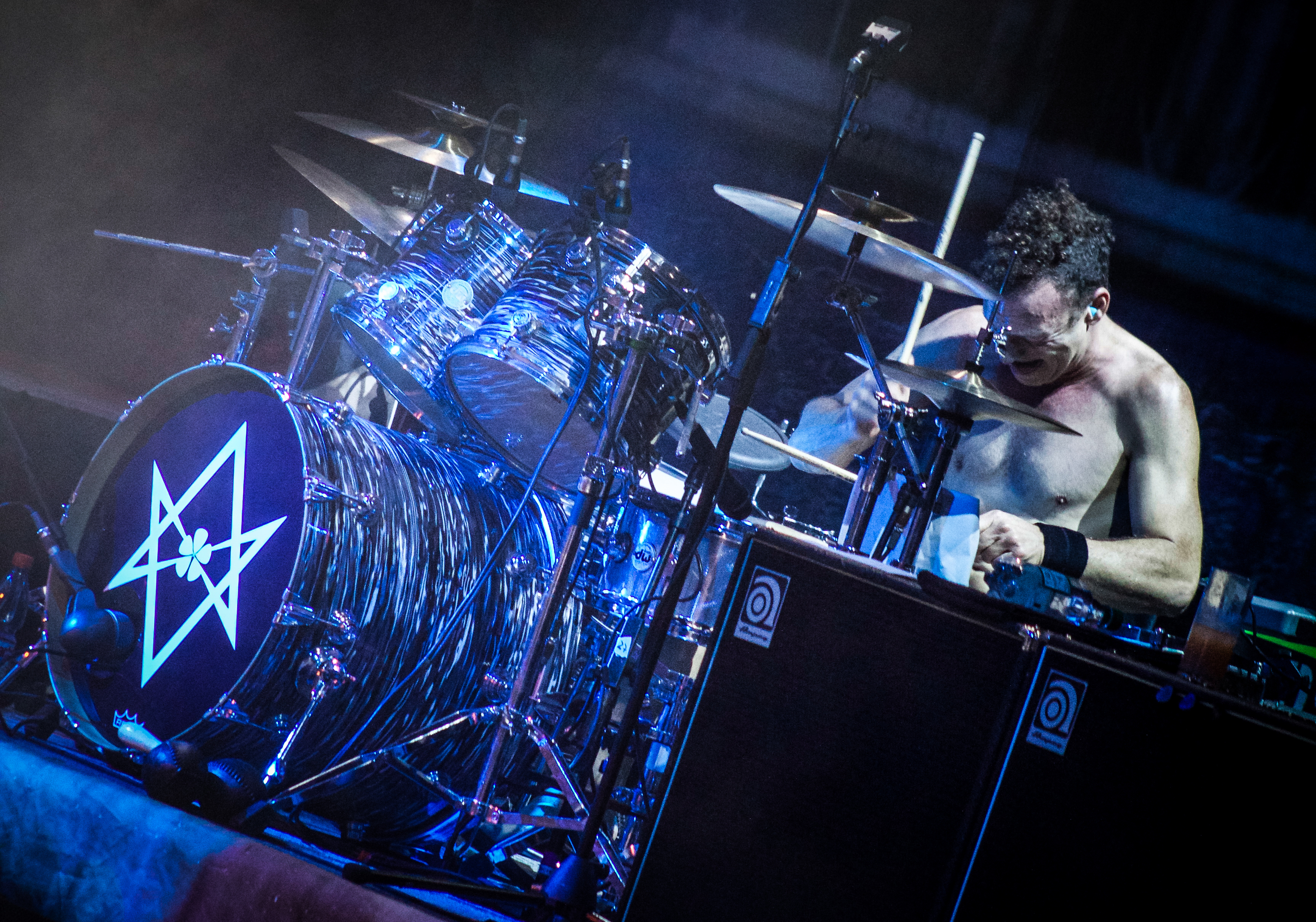
- Perkins performing in 2013

Background information
- Born: Stephen Andrew Perkins; September 13, 1967 (age 58); Los Angeles, California, U.S.
- Genres: Alternative rock, alternative metal
- Occupations: Musician, songwriter, producer
- Instruments: Drums, percussion
- Years active: 1986–present
- Labels: Triple X, Warner Bros., EMI, Capitol, Epic, CyberOctave, Sanctuary, Blood Stained Stars

Stephen Andrew Perkins (born September 13, 1967) is an American musician and songwriter. A drummer and percussionist, he has played with Jane's Addiction, Porno for Pyros, Banyan and Hellride. His style blends rock, jazz, swing, African, Indian and Latin drumming styles together.

== Early life and education ==
Perkins grew up in Los Angeles and attended Notre Dame High School in Sherman Oaks, California. He got his first drum kit at age 13 and was primarily influenced by jazz and swing, as well as rock drummers such as Keith Moon and John Bonham. A few years later he met Dave Navarro and together they formed a metal band called Disaster.

== Career ==
=== 1985–1990: Jane's Addiction ===
In 1985, when he was 17, Perkins was dating the younger sister of bassist Eric Avery. Perry Farrell had worked with Avery in his band Psi Com. Perkins was recruited to join a new band with Farrell and Avery, replacing early drummer Matt Chaikin. He convinced them to replace their guitarist with Navarro and they began playing shows around LA in downtown ballrooms and clubs. Perkins states that Jane’s Addiction played late shows at parties which would be attended by other LA musicians after they had played their own shows. He recorded three albums and toured extensively with Jane’s Addiction before they broke up in 1991.

=== 1990–2000: Porno For Pyros, Infectious Grooves, and Banyan ===
Perkins formed Infectious Grooves with Suicidal Tendencies singer Mike Muir in 1989. After Jane’s Addiction broke up, Infectious Grooves toured in support of Ozzy Osbourne on his No More Tears tour. The following year he reunited with Farrell to begin work on Porno for Pyros. Perkins changed his drum setup for this band, including more percussive instruments in his search for new sounds. He also formed his own band, Banyan – an instrumental act where he felt he could drive the music like jazz bands led by Gene Krupa and Billy Cobham.

Porno for Pyros toured extensively through the early 90s, which influenced their music and Perkins drumming. In 1997, Jane’s Addiction reformed for a one off tour, and released the compilation album Kettle Whistle. Porno for Pyros then went on hiatus in 1998.

=== 2000–2008: Methods of Mayhem, second Jane's Addiction era ===
Perkins began touring with Tommy Lee’s band Methods of Mayhem in 1999. After the band broke up in 2000, he continued his ongoing relationship with Farrell, contributing drum tracks to three songs on Farrell’s solo album Song Yet to Be Sung in 2001. This was followed by a Jane’s Addiction reformation tour and album, Strays released in 2003. Throughout this period Perkins continued to tour with Jane’s Addiction, and then in 2004 began playing in The Panic Channel with Navarro and Chris Chaney from Jane’s Addiction, along with Steve Isaacs on vocals. He also performed with The Mutaytor in 2006, as well as releasing an instructional DVD Stephen Perkins – A Drummer's Life produced by Drum Workshop.

=== 2008–2024: Third and final Jane's Addiction era ===
Perkins again joined with Farrell to reform Jane’s Addiction for 3 shows in 2008, and a full tour in 2009. However, in July that year he suffered from a serious infection in his arm and the Australian leg of the tour had to be cancelled. After his recovery, Jane’s Addiction continued to tour and recorded their fourth studio album The Great Escape Artist in 2011. Perkins played with Jane’s Addiction on their tours and sporadic performances throughout the 2010s and early 2020s, and has also played with Porno for Pyros since their reformation in 2020.

Perkins played in Tabitha with the Okai Sisters between 2015-2018. Since 2019, Perkins has performed in Think:EXP with Pink Floyd saxophonist Scott Page.

Jane's Addiction announced a reunion tour in 2024 with founding bassist Eric Avery and also released their first song in 34 years with Avery. During the band's show in Boston on September 13, 2024, Farrell shoved and punched Navarro and had to be restained by crew members. Farrell's wife, Etty Lau Farrell, said Farrell had been suffering from tinnitus and a sore throat and felt his voice was being drowned out by the band. The following day, Jane's Addiction issued an apology and canceled their scheduled show at Bridgeport, Connecticut. On September 16, they canceled the remainder of the tour and said they would "take some time away as a group". Perkins, Avery and Navarro released a joint statement attributing the cancellation to Farrell's behavior and mental health, while Farrell released an apology of his own, saying his behavior was "inexcusable".

In January 2025, it was revealed that Perkins, Avery and Navarro were working on new music together, without the participation of Perry Farrell and according to Navarro, Jane's Addiction were finished and no more reunions would happen due to the incident with Farrell.

In July 2025, Perkins, Avery and Navarro filed a lawsuit against Farrell accusing him of assault, battery, intentional infliction of emotional distress, negligence, breach of fiduciary duty, and breach of contract. The lawsuit also alleges that the group lost over $10 million as a result of the tour’s cancellation and cessation of all band activities including the first studio album with the classic lineup since 1990. Farrell a few hours later subsequently filed his own lawsuit against Perkins, Avery and Navarro, accusing his bandmates of bullying, assault and battery, and for "harassing him onstage during performances" which allegedly included "playing their instruments at a high volume so that he could not hear himself sing without blasting his own in-ear monitors at an unsafe level." Farrell also seeks damages for libel, claiming that the other members inaccurately described him in the media as suffering from poor mental health and alcoholism. With the lawsuits, this marked the end of Perkins and Farrell's working relationship which spanned nearly forty years and two bands, Jane's Addiction and Porno for Pyros, together.

== Community work ==
Perkins has run drum circles for disabled children, adults, and elderly people at a camp in Malibu. He helped develop a wearable percussive instrument called a GoJo Bag which disabled people could use when they were unable to play a drum.

== Discography ==
Jane's Addiction

- 1987 – Jane's Addiction
- 1988 – Nothing's Shocking
- 1990 – Ritual de lo Habitual
- 1991 – Live and Rare (Compilation of live tracks, demos, and album tracks)
- 1997 – Kettle Whistle (Compilation of live tracks, demos, new songs and unreleased material)
- 2003 – Strays
- 2006 – Up from the Catacombs (Greatest hits album)
- 2009 – A Cabinet of Curiosities (Box set)
- 2011 – The Great Escape Artist
- 2024 – Imminent Redemption / True Love

Infectious Grooves

- 1991 – The Plague That Makes Your Booty Move...It's the Infectious Grooves

Porno for Pyros

- 1993 – Porno for Pyros
- 1996 – Good God's Urge
- 2023/2024 - Agua / Pete's Dad / Little Me / Fingernail

Nine Inch Nails

- 1994 – The Downward Spiral Drum performance for "I Do Not Want This"

Banyan

- 1997 – Banyan
- 1999 – Anytime at All
- 2004 – Live at Perkins' Palace

Perry Farrell

- 1999 – Rev
- 2001 – Song Yet to Be Sung

The Panic Channel

- 2006 – (ONe)

Hellflower

- 2010 – Us You
