= Porno for Pyros =

American alternative rock band

- Porno for Pyros in 1993. Left to right: Perkins, DiStefano, LeNoble, Farrell

Background information
- Origin: Los Angeles, California, U.S.
- Genre: Alternative rock
- Years active: 1992–1998; 2009; 2020; 2022–2024
- Label: Warner Bros.
- Spinoff of: Jane's Addiction
- Past members: Perry Farrell; Stephen Perkins; Peter DiStefano; Mike Watt; Robin Hatch; Martyn LeNoble

Porno for Pyros was an American alternative rock band formed in Los Angeles, California, in 1992, following the first break-up of Jane's Addiction. The band's final lineup consisted of Jane's Addiction members Perry Farrell (vocals) and Stephen Perkins (drums), alongside Peter DiStefano (guitar) and Mike Watt (bass). Founding bass guitarist Martyn LeNoble was a member of the band between 1992 and 1995, and was initially committed to the band's reunion between 2022 and 2023.

The band released two studio albums, Porno for Pyros (1993) and Good God's Urge (1996), before going on hiatus in 1998. In 2009, the original line-up reunited for a one-off appearance at frontman Perry Farrell's 50th birthday party. In 2020, the Watt-era line-up of the band reunited for Lolla2020, a free YouTube broadcast event taking place amidst global COVID-19 lockdowns. Following the appearance, members of the group continued to work on new material together, and in 2022, Farrell and Perkins reunited Porno for Pyros for their first large-scale public performances in more than 24 years, leading to a full reunion of the band's original line-up at Welcome to Rockville festival.

The original four-piece recorded new material in 2023, with plans to release a four-track EP in 2024. After a full reunion tour was rescheduled to 2024, LeNoble amicably left the band in November 2023, with the band subsequently announcing that their forthcoming tour would be a farewell tour.

== History ==
=== 1992–1994: Formation and Porno for Pyros ===
Following the demise of the critically and commercially successful Jane's Addiction, frontman Perry Farrell and drummer Stephen Perkins formed Porno for Pyros after acquiring guitarist Peter DiStefano and bass player Martyn LeNoble. Farrell named the band after seeing an advertisement for fireworks in a pornographic magazine. The name has also been connected through song lyrics to the 1992 Los Angeles riots which occurred in the band's hometown around the time of Porno for Pyros' inception. Prior to releasing their eponymous debut album, Porno for Pyros embarked on a nationwide tour to support the new band. By the time the album was released in 1993, anticipation surrounding the project was enough to briefly drive the album to the No. 3 position on the Billboard top 200 list. The video for the album's second single, "Pets", received heavy airplay on MTV. Following the album's release, Porno for Pyros continued a heavy touring schedule, including an appearance at Woodstock '94 along with a cameo on HBO's The Larry Sanders Show. Just like the super artsy rock shows that were the hallmark of live Jane's Addiction, Porno for Pyros live shows relied heavily on props, extras and special effects (including pyrotechnics).

=== 1995–1998: Good God's Urge and break-up ===
For the band's follow-up album, Good God's Urge, bass player LeNoble quit after completing the majority of the bass tracks. Ex-Minutemen bassist Mike Watt was brought in to finish up the album tracks and join the band on tour. The album also featured the post-Jane's reunion of Farrell with guitarist Dave Navarro, who made a guest appearance on "Freeway", along with Red Hot Chili Peppers bass player Flea. The band again set forth on a heavy touring schedule with Watt on bass, then with Flea on bass with Perkins and Farrell's former Jane's Addiction bandmate Dave Navarro on guitar. In reality, the end of Porno for Pyros bled into the "relapsed Jane's Addiction" situation, as Jane's guitarist Dave Navarro and his Red Hot Chili Pepper bandmate Flea guested on 2 songs from the Good God's Urge sessions, "Freeway" and "Hard Charger." As "Hard Charger" was released and charted as a single from the soundtrack of the Howard Stern film Private Parts, the final touring dates for Porno for Pyros featured 3/4 of Jane's Addiction Dave Navarro and Flea onstage with Peter DeStefano and touring members Sunny Reinhart and Thomas "TJ" Johnson. On several tour stops Porno for Pyros played "Mountain Song", a popular Jane's Addiction tune, a foreshadowing of the later Jane's Addiction reunion efforts. Further touring by the band was scuttled when DiStefano was diagnosed with cancer.

Perkins and Watt subsequently formed the jazz-punk improvisation group Banyan and, along with DiStefano, occasionally perform sets of Stooges cover versions in the Los Angeles area under the band name Hellride.

=== 2009–2019: One-off reunion and rumours ===
In April 2009, the original lineup of Farrell, Perkins, DiStefano, and LeNoble performed at Farrell's 50th birthday party. In April 2011, Farrell wrote on his Twitter account: "One day, more Porno For Pyros", suggesting that the band would reunite in the future. On September 3, 2012, DiStefano stated that the band would be active in 2013, which was later also announced by Farrell on his Facebook page on July 6, 2013. In 2018, the band were rumoured to be part of an immersive entertainment experience in Las Vegas, named Kind Heaven, created by Farrell, which never came to fruition.

=== 2020–2024: Full reunion and farewell tour ===
On July 27, 2020, it was announced that for the first time in 22 years, Porno for Pyros (featuring the lineup of Perry Farrell, Stephen Perkins, Mike Watt and Peter DiStefano) would be reuniting to play Lolla2020, a free four-night YouTube broadcast event taking place on the original dates of the 2020 Chicago-based Lollapalooza festival, Thursday, July 30 through Sunday, August 2.

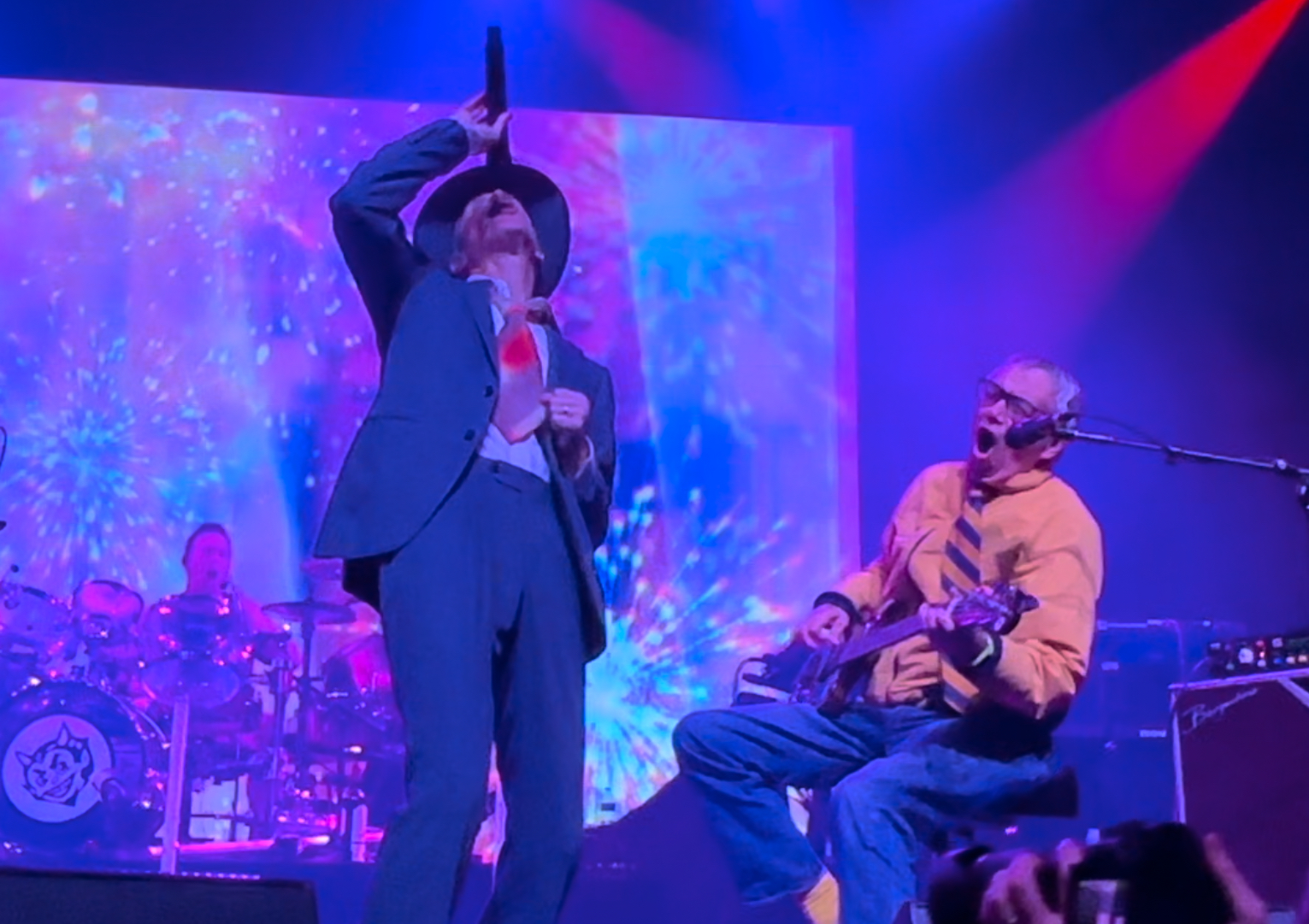
Perry Farrell and Mike Watt perform with Porno for Pyros on March 10, 2024. This was the last performance of the final tour for Porno for Pyros.

On July 20, 2021, DiStefano announced on his Facebook page that he, Farrell and Perkins were working on what will be new material from Porno for Pyros in over two decades.

On May 18, 2022, Farrell shared Jane’s Addiction will not be playing Welcome to Rockville concert in Daytona Beach, Florida, on May 22 due to guitarist Dave Navarro suffering from a “long bout” of COVID-19, but is reuniting his band Porno for Pyros for the performance. “The gang and the government are no different. That makes me 1%. Rockville, although we are blue that Jane’s cannot be with you at this time due to Dave’s long bout with COVID, I am still coming to Daytona, bringing to you for the first time in 26 years Porno For Pyros Featuring myself, Perry Farrell, Stephen Perkins, Peter DiStefeno and Mike Watt. We’ll play some Jane’s songs for you as well, but for now let’s recall: My boat’s capsized it’s gonna sink to the bottom. I can see the lights on the shore…” noted Farrell on the Welcome to Rockville Facebook page. Drummer Stephen Perkins was replaced by his drum tech Mike Gryciuk for the performance due to a stomach virus, with Nick Maybury, formerly of Scott Weiland & the Wildabouts on additional guitar.

For the band's subsequent summer shows and appearance at Lollapalooza, founding bassist Martyn LeNoble rejoined the band, with the original four-piece working on new material the following year. The band will release a four-track EP of original material in 2024.

After the band's initial reunion tour was postponed and rescheduled, LeNoble announced his amicable departure from the band on November 13, 2023: "I’m so excited for the world to hear "Agua" and the other unreleased material from our recent sessions. There is a real connection between these new songs and how we've grown. We've mended our friendships and recorded these songs with love. I think you will hear that in the recordings. I've changed. I like quiet and nature. With that being said, I will be following my passion for wildlife and will not be part of the upcoming tour. I wish my brothers Perry, Pete and Stephen the best. I'm truly grateful for every moment I spent with them. Most importantly, thank you to all of you for all of the amazing support and memories."

Following LeNoble's departure, the band announced that their 2024 tour would now be a farewell tour, titled the "Horns, Thorns en Halos", with Mike Watt rejoining the band on bass guitar for its final shows.

== Members ==
Final lineup

- Perry Farrell – lead vocals, harmonica, percussion (1992–1998, 2009, 2020, 2022–2024)
- Stephen Perkins – drums, percussion, backing vocals (1992–1998, 2009, 2020, 2022–2024)
- Peter DiStefano – guitar, backing vocals (1992–1998, 2009, 2020, 2022–2024)
- Mike Watt – bass, backing vocals (1995–1998, 2020, 2022, 2023–2024)
- Robin Hatch – keyboards (2023–2024)

Former members

- Martyn LeNoble – bass, backing vocals (1992–1995, 2009, 2022–2023)

== Discography ==
=== Studio albums ===
List of studio albums, with selected chart positions and certifications
| Title | Album details | Peak chart positions | | | | | | | Certifications |
| Title | Album details | US | US Cash | AUS | NOR | NZ | SWE | UK | Certifications |
|---|---|---|---|---|---|---|---|---|---|
| Porno for Pyros | Released: April 27, 1993; Label: Warner Bros.; Formats: CD, CS, LP, digital download | 3 | 1 | 35 | — | 16 | — | 13 | RIAA: Gold |
| Good God's Urge | Released: May 28, 1996; Label: Warner Bros.; Formats: CD, CS, LP, digital download | 20 | 29 | 20 | 18 | 20 | 57 | 40 | — |
"—" denotes a recording that did not chart or was not released in that territory.

=== Compilation albums ===
- Rhino Hi-Five : Porno for Pyros (2007)

=== Singles ===
| Year | Title | Peak chart positions | | | | | | Album |
| Year | Title | US | US Airplay | US Modern | US Mainstream | AUS | UK | Album |
|---|---|---|---|---|---|---|---|---|
| 1993 | "Cursed Female" | — | — | 3 | — | — | — | Porno for Pyros |
| 1993 | "Pets" | 67 | 67 | 1 | 25 | 68 | 53 | Porno for Pyros |
| 1994 | "Sadness" | — | — | — | — | — | — | Porno for Pyros |
| 1996 | "Tahitian Moon" | | 46 | 8 | 34 | — | — | Good God's Urge |
| 1997 | "Hard Charger" | — | — | 23 | — | — | — | Private Parts |
| 2023 | "Agua" | — | — | — | — | — | — | Non-album single |
| 2023 | "Pete's Dad" | — | — | — | — | — | — | Non-album single |
| 2024 | "Little Me" | — | — | — | — | — | — | Non-album single |
| 2024 | "Fingernail" | — | — | — | — | — | — | Non-album single |
"—" denotes singles that did not chart.

=== Music videos ===
| Date | Title | Director(s) | Notes |
|---|---|---|---|
| May 1993 | "Cursed Female" | Melodie McDaniel | Prod co: Palomar Pictures; DP: Wyatt Troll (16 mm) |
| June 1993 | "Pets" | Jonathan Dayton and Valerie Faris | Producer: Bart Lipton; DP: Christophe Lanzenberg |
| November 1993 | "Sadness" | John Lindauer | Prod co: Chelsea Pictures; Producers: John Oetjen, Chris Wagoner, Keith Milton; DP: Eric Engler; Stylist: Kristine Miller; based on the performance art piece Four Scenes in a Harsh Life by Ron Athey (concept, co-director and featured actor) |
| May 1996 | "Tahitian Moon" | John Linson & Perry Farrell | Filmed in Tahiti. |
| October 1996 | "100 Ways" | Andrew Dosunmu (as Rusty James) | Prod co: Propaganda Films |
| February 1997 | "Hard Charger" | Liz Friedlander (as Alan Smithee) & Geoff Nelson | Prod co: DNA; Producer: Pete Chambers; Stylist: Gretchen Patch |
