= Behind the Magnolia Curtain =

Studio album by Tav Falco's Panther Burns
- Released: October 1981
- Studio: Ardent
- Length: Rockabilly revival, blues rock
- Label: Frenzi/Rough Trade

Tav Falco's Panther Burns chronology
She's the One to Blame (1980)	Behind the Magnolia Curtain (1981)	Blow Your Top (1982)

Behind the Magnolia Curtain is the debut album by the American band Tav Falco's Panther Burns, released in October 1981. It was rereleased by Fat Possum Records in 2012.

== Production ==
The album was recorded at Ardent Studios, in Memphis, in six hours over two days. Most of the tracks were captured in one take, without overdubbing and with minimal mixing. Alex Chilton, as L X Chilton, played guitar; a drum group that included Othar Turner contributed to some tracks. "Snake Drive" is a cover of the R. L. Burnside song. "Bourgeois Blues" is a version of the Leadbelly song. "St. Louis Blues" was written by W. C. Handy.

== Critical reception ==
Professional ratings
Review scores
Source	Rating
AllMusic	5/5 stars
The Boston Phoenix	1/4 stars
The Encyclopedia of Popular Music	3/5 stars
The Great Indie Discography	5/10
Houston Chronicle	1/5 stars
Omaha World-Herald	3/5 stars
Pitchfork	8.7/10

The Lansing State Journal opined that the album "sounds like it was recorded in a Transylvania sewer with a $1.58 microphone." The Omaha World-Herald noted that, like the band's live show, the album "occasionally hit[s] the raw rockabilly feel." The Widnes Weekly News likened it to "the Stray Cats with more grease, guts and gusto." Likewise, the Swindon Advertiser said that "the Cramps seems positively polished in comparison."

The Detroit Free Press called Behind the Magnolia Curtain "a sensuously hideous masterpiece similar to the psychedelic blues-rock of the 1960s." Dave Marsh labeled it "the most eccentric rockabilly revival item of the year." The Houston Chronicle considered it "the sloppiest, laziest, more slovenly recording to come down the trail since the advent of multi-tracking."

AllMusic called Behind the Magnolia Curtain "one of the great recordings to emerge from the post-punk era and remains the essential Panther Burns document." In 2026, Pitchfork noted that "Panther Burns weaponized their amateurism, but never condescended to the source material".

== Track listing ==
Side A

1. "Come On Little Mama"
2. "She's the One That Got It"
3. "Hey High School Baby"
4. "Brazil"
5. "You're Undecided"
6. "OoooEE Baby"
7. "St. Louis Blues"

Side B

1. "Snake Drive"
2. "Blind Man"
3. "Where the Rio de Rosa Flows"
4. "Snatch It Back"
5. "Bourgeois Blues"
6. "On Down the Line"
