= Desire on Ice =

Studio album by Tav Falco
- Released: 12 September 2025
- Recorded: February 2025 (basic tracks)
- Studios: Sam Phillips Recording Service, Memphis
- Genres: Rock and roll, psychedelic rock
- Length: 46:16
- Label: Frenzi / Org Music
- Producer: Mario Monterosso

Tav Falco chronology
Nashville Sessions: Live at Bridgestone Arena Studios (2023)	Desire on Ice (2025)

Desire on Ice is a studio album by Tav Falco. It is his sixth solo album, and fourteenth album total including those released under the name Tav Falco Panther Burns. The album features reworked versions of original songs written by Falco, most of which were featured on previous albums. A large roster of guest musicians appear on the album, including Jon Spencer (Jon Spencer Blues Explosion), The Reverend Horton Heat, Bobby Gillespie (Primal Scream / The Jesus and Mary Chain), Ann Magnuson, and many more. Desire On Ice was released by Org Music on 12 September 2025 on vinyl LP, CD, and digital editions to positive reviews.

== Background ==
Tav Falco producer and Panther Burns member Mario Monterosso developed a concept for a Tav Falco album that drew from previous Falco-penned original songs, and then reinterpreted the songs in new and unusual ways. The concept resonated with Falco, who liked the concept of bridging the moments when the songs were written with his current state of mind, as well as the idea of being true to the original songs whilst bringing a fresh and adventurous approach to the new interpretations.

Monterosso began working on Desire on Ice in late 2023 after the completion of a set of US tours which yielded the live-in-the-studio album Nashville Sessions: Live at Bridgestone Arena Studios. The production process took approximately eighteen months to complete. Falco and Monterosso recorded basic tracks for Desire on Ice in February 2024 at Sam Phillips Recording Service in Memphis, Tennessee. In addition to Monterosso, Panther Burns members Giuseppe Sangirardi and Walter Brunetti worked as session musicians on the album.

Several of the reworked tracks were recorded for Falco's previous album Conjurations: Séance for Deranged Lovers (2010). Others include "Cuban Rebel Girl" (first recorded on the 1984 album Now!), "Vampire from Havana" (from the 1991 album Life Sentence in the Cathouse), and "Doomsday Baby" (from 2015's Command Performance). Also included are three new tracks, entitled "Prologue," "Crying for More" and "Epilogue." Memphis writer and longtime Tav Falco Panther Burns confidante Robert Gordon contributed liner notes to the album.

=== Guest appearances ===
Monterosso assembled a large set of celebrity guest musicians to appear on the album. The guests recorded their parts for the album remotely and were given free artistic agency in the collaboration process. They include: Tav Falco Panther Burns alumni Jimmy Rip (Jerry Lee Lewis / Tom Verlaine), Jim Sclavunos (Nick Cave and the Bad Seeds) and René Coman (Alex Chilton / Willy Deville); Charlie Musselwhite; Bobby Gillespie (Primal Scream / The Jesus and Mary Chain); Jon Spencer (Jon Spencer Blues Explosion); The Reverend Horton Heat; Kid Congo Powers (The Cramps / Nick Cave and the Bad Seeds); Chris Spedding (Jack Bruce / Ginger Baker); rockabilly guitarist Boz Boorer; Eddie Angel (Los Straitjackets); female performers Ann Magnuson, Nicole Atkins and Jolie Holland; and many more.

== Reception ==
The album immediately received excellent reviews. Mojo gave the album its own inset and rated the album five stars (out of five). Uncut rated the album 8/10, and devoted a full page to the album's story, along with an interview with Falco and a full listing of the album's celebrity guests. Classic Rock magazine also rated the album an 8/10, describing the album as "Irresistibly intoxicating." The Vinyl District rated the album an "A", stating that "Soaking up all [the] guest contributions to Desire on Ice is a sheer pleasure, but more importantly, the set flows as a robust album experience...with no knowledge of the stacked lineup required." Vintage Rock gave the album 3.5/5 stars, commenting that "Desire On Ice rebuilds these songs into something new, and there are few albums which tell such a complete story of an artist's long journey through the music biz."

== Track listing ==
Side one
No.	Title	Length
1.	"Prologue" (previously unrecorded)	2:10
2.	"Gentleman in Black" (first recorded on Disappearing Angels, 1996; also recorded on Conjurations: Séance for Deranged Lovers, 2010)	4:05
3.	"Cuban Rebel Girl" (first performed on Now!, 1984; first studio recording on Shake Rag EP, 1986)	3:10
4.	"Sympathy for Mata Hari" (from Conjurations: Séance for Deranged Lovers)	3:10
5.	"Vampire from Havana" (from Life Sentence [aka Life Sentence in the Cathouse], 1991)	2:26
6.	"Doomsday Baby" (from Command Performance, 2015)	3:05

Side two
No.	Title	Length
7.	"Crying for More" (previously unrecorded)	3:47
8.	"The Ballad of Rue de la Lune" (from Conjurations: Séance for Deranged Lovers)	4:54
9.	"Garden of the Mecidis" (from Conjurations: Séance for Deranged Lovers)	3:20
10.	"Lady From Shanghai" (from Conjurations: Séance for Deranged Lovers)	3:21
11.	"Chamber of Desire" (from Conjurations: Séance for Deranged Lovers)	3:50
12.	"Epilogue" (previously unrecorded)	1:20
Total length:		46:16

== Personnel ==
Musicians:

- Tav Falco – Vocals (2–11), guitar (3–4)
- Mario Monterosso – Electric guitar (1–12), piano (7, 11), backing vocals (7)
- Giuseppe Sangirardi – Bass (2–4, 8–9)
- Walter Brunetti – Drums (2–4, 8–9)
- Puccio Panettieri – Drums (5, 7, 11), Percussion (2–10, 12)
- Scott Bomar – Bass (5, 7, 11)

Guest Musicians:

- Kid Congo Powers – Vocals [spoken word] (1)
- John Spencer – Vocals, electric guitar (4)
- Ann Magnuson – Vocals (5)
- Pete Molinari – Vocals (8)
- Jolie Holland – Vocals (11)
- Nicole Atkins – Vocals [spoken word] (12), backing vocals (7)
- Jimmy Rip – Electric guitar (2)
- Chris Spedding – Electric guitar (3)
- Chris Maxwell – Electric guitar (4)
- Bubba Feathers – Electric Guitar (5)
- Eddie Angel – Electric guitar (12)
- Richard Barone – Acoustic guitar (7)
- Francesco d'Agnolo – Piano (3)
- Bertrand Burgalat – Piano (9)
- Alex Greene – Piano (10)
- Michael Perry Allen – Keyboards (6)
- Kai Eric – Bass (6)
- Boz Boorer – Guitar (8)
- René Coman – Contrabass (10)
- Luca Chiappara – Electric Bass (12)
- Jim Sclavunos – Drums (6)
- Ross Johnson – Percussion (1)
- Charlie Musselwhite – Harmonica (3)
- Jonathan Kirkscey – Cello (4)
- Mirko Dettori – Accordion (9)

Additional personnel:

- Mario Monterosso – Producer
- Scott Bomar – Mixing
- Dave Gardner – Mastering
- Mastering – Dave Gardner
- Mitch Rossiter – Layout
- Alberto García-Alix, Laura Levine, Youri Lenquette – Photography
- Liner Notes – Robert Gordon, Tav Falco

Recorded at Sam Phillips Recording Service, Memphis
Mastered at DSG Mastering, Los Angeles
