= Mario Monterosso =

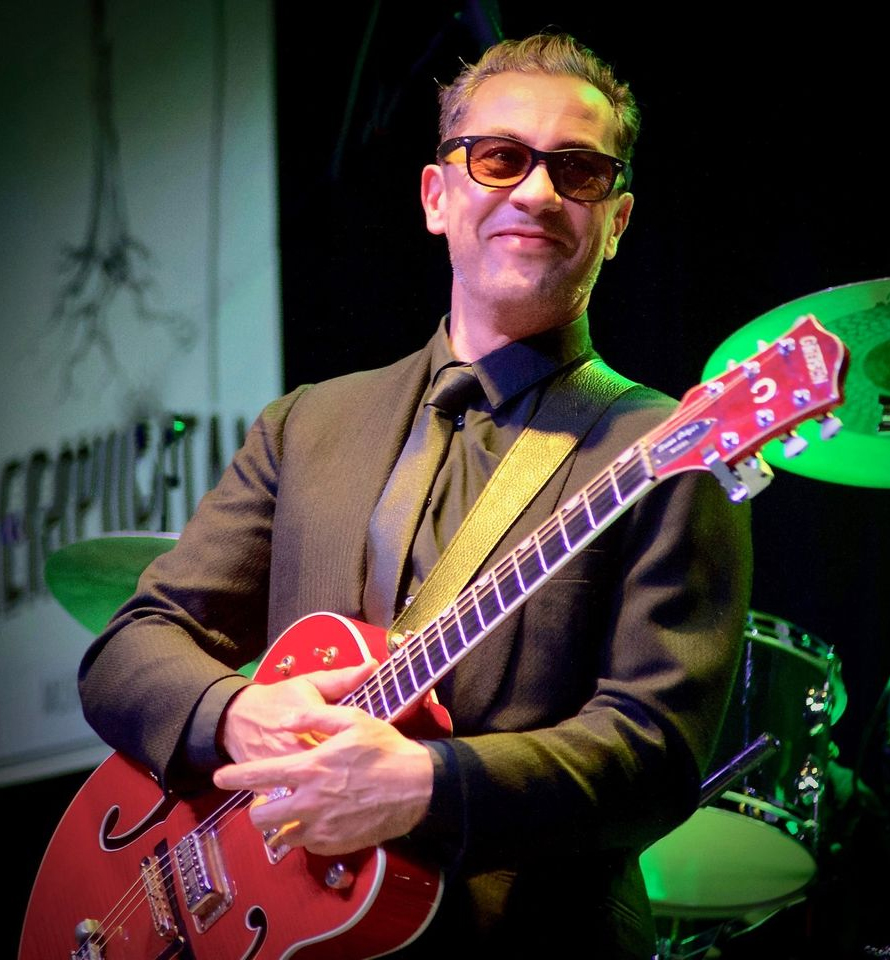
- Mario Monterosso at the Ameripolitan Awards, Memphis TN, 11 February 2018.

Background information
- Also known as: Eddie Redmount
- Born: 10 October 1972 (age 53); Catania, Sicily, Italy
- Genres: Rock and roll, rockabilly, rhythm and blues, swing music, cabaret
- Occupations: Musician, producer, songwriter, cabaret performer, theatre performer
- Instrument: Guitar
- Years active: 1987–present
- Labels: Org Music, Black and Wyatt Records, Goodfellas
- Member of: Tav Falco Panther Burns
- Website: Mario Monterosso Official Website

Mario Monterosso (born 10 October 1972) is an Italian-born musician, producer, songwriter, and cabaret and theater performer. Originally from Sicily, Monterosso worked professionally in Rome, and is currently based in Tennessee in The United States. He is best known for his production work with rock and roll musician Tav Falco, and is a current member of his backing band Tav Falco's Panther Burns.

== Biography ==
Monterosso was born in Catania, in the autonomous region of Sicily in Italy. His great aunt was a well-known opera singer, and his father wrote about opera and encouraged his children in musical pursuits.

=== In Italy ===
Sicilian rockabilly musician Vince Mannino was an early mentor to Monterosso and inspired him to began learning guitar, with Chuck Berry, Carl Perkins, Scotty Moore, and Brian Setzer being a few of his early influences. Monterosso began performing live at the age of 14. He moved to Rome to further his career as a musician, while working as a clerk in the Italian court chancellery by day. He performed as sideman to singer Carmen Consoli on an Italian tour in December 2004.

In 2013, Monterosso performed in the theatrical production Chi erano i Jolly Rockers? (Who Were the Jolly Rockers?) alongside Claudio "Greg" Gregori of the theatre duo Lillo & Greg; Lillo & Greg were also featured as part of the production. The production played April 2–21, 2013 at the Teatro Olimpico in Rome.

Monterosso recorded an album of semi-autobiographic songs that re-imagined himself as an Italian immigrant to the United States in the 1940s. When cabaret owner Maria Freitas heard the songs, she suggested building the album into something larger. The resulting cabaret production, Fui e Sono Eddie Redmount, debuted in Freitas' La Conventicola Degli Ultramoderni in Rome in November 2017. The production was later directed by Claudio "Greg" Gregori, and played at Catania's Teatro MUST (formerly known as Teatro Angelo Musco) in March 2018, and again at Teatro Manzoni in Rome in December 2019.

Italian author and attorney Alessandra Tucci wrote the novel Le sei corde dell'anima based on Monterosso's life. The book was published in Italy on 20 April 2021.

=== In the United States ===
In 2016, Monterosso moved to Memphis, Tennessee, and began working with local artists such as John Paul Keith, Gary Hardy, Brandon Cunning and Jason D. Williams. He produced the album Greetings From Austin for The Don Diego Trio in 2017.

On February 10, 2018, Monterosso, Claudio "Greg" Gregori (Lillo & Greg), Diego "Don Diego" Geraci (The Don Diego Trio), and Italian rockabilly performer Antonio Sorgentone recorded a supergroup project at Sun Studio under the name The Million Euro Quartet. The project was a tribute to the 1956 Million Dollar Quartet session, and featured Gina Haley (daughter of Bill Haley) as guest vocalist.

Monterosso has also worked extensively with musician Dale Watson, organizer of the Ameripolitan Music Awards, and co-wrote four tracks featured on the album Dale Watson & the Memphians.

==== "Steady Girl" single ====
On 8 July 2019, Monterosso recorded the single "Steady Girl" b/w "Waiting for a Beer" at Sun Studio in Memphis. The A-side is a cover of an obscure rockabilly song recorded at Memphis Recording Service on December 8, 1956, and was initially unreleased. A collector sold a 78 rpm acetate containing two takes of the track to Black and Wyatt Records, who in turn reissued the tracks as a 7-inch single in 2019. The two tracks were discussed as potentially being the earliest known garage rock recordings. Monterosso's cover version streamlines the original song, and is coupled with an original song entitled "Waiting For a Beer," the latter recorded in a country & western / honky tonk style. The single features cover layout by Claudio "Greg" Gregori, and was released on 16 January 2020 by Black and Wyatt.

==== Take It Away ====
In early 2020, Monterosso recorded an instrumental album with Dale Watson that featured all instrumental tracks, four of which Monterosso had written. During this time, he wrote "The Ballad of Zorro," a tribute to the 1975 Italian swashbuckler film Zorro and its Guido & Maurizio De Angelis-penned soundtrack. With this and a number of other songs written, Monterosso then flew to Sicily to visit his ailing mother. While there, he had Rome-based engineer Matteo Spinazzè recorded an album on location in an 18th-century house in Trecastagni owned by his family. The album was recorded in summer 2020 with a backup band featuring childhood friends of Monterosso's. The album was recorded live, and minimal overdubs were added later. One track, "Midnight In Memphis," features narration by Tav Falco. A video for "The Ballad of Zorro" was filmed in Sicily by singer-songwriter Fabio Abate.

The album, titled Take It Away, was initially released on digital formats only on 14 February 2022 by Org Music in Los Angeles. The Memphis Flyer stated that the album's tracks "offer a guided tour through the instrumental sounds of the '50s and '60s." Both The Sicilian Post and US magazine Exotica Moderne noted that the album expanded on the sound established by guitar duo Santo and Johnny.

==== "Simple Song of Freedom" charity single ====
In January 2022, in the latter stages of the COVID-19 pandemic, Monterosso watched Beyond The Sea (2004), a biographical film about the life of singer Bobby Darin. Prior to watching the film, Monterosso was only familiar with Darin’s major hits. He was intrigued by Darin’s anti-Vietnam War protest song “Simple Song of Freedom,” which was featured in the film, and developed a concept for re-arranging and re-recording the song. Two weeks later, the Russo-Ukrainian War became headline news and a major topic in social media. Monterosso decided to move forward with production of this re-recording due a promoter friend based in Latvia, who encouraged him and other musicians to do something about the Russia–Ukraine conflict.

The “Simple Song of Freedom” project was underwritten by Dorothy Orgill Kirsch, a major Memphis arts patron and widow of Memphis Arts Council co-founder William F. Kirsch Jr. Inspired by the 1985 charity single “We are the World,” Monterosso assembled a “who’s who” of musicians from Memphis and abroad, including Carla Thomas, Kallen Esperian, Larry Dodson (The Bar-Keys), Rev. Charles Hodges, Primo Candelaria and J. W. Lance (The Coasters), and songwriter Pete Molinari, as well as members of the choirs of Stax Music Academy and the First Baptist Church of Memphis. A total of 30 musicians and 30 singers were utilized for the project. The song was recorded at Sam Phillips Recording Studio by engineer Scott Bomar.

Filmmaker Billie Worley recorded video footage of the musicians during the session, which was edited into a music video. Priscilla Presley, widow of Elvis Presley, made a special appearance in the video, complete with a monologue quoting Mother Teresa at the end of the film. The music video debuted at the Memphis Brooks Museum of Art on 20 December 2023, in honor of the 50th anniversary of the passing of Bobby Darin. The project received official recognition from The City of Memphis.

=== With Tav Falco ===
In 2014, a friend of Monterosso's informed him that veteran rock and roll performer Tav Falco was in Rome and was interested in recording there. Monterosso immediately offered his services and was hired. Falco recorded the album in Rome's Exit Studios in August–September 2014. The album, titled Command Performance, was released in 2015 on the UK label Twenty Stone Blatt Records. Monterosso is credited for artistic production and also as a member of Tav's Falco's Panther Burns. He also co-wrote the album's songs "Master of Chaos" and "Memphis Ramble" with Falco.

Monterosso toured The United States with Tav's Falco's Panther Burns in October–November 2015. Entitled "The Whistle Blower Tour", the tour featured Mike Watt and Toby Dammit, both former members of Iggy and the Stooges, as members of The Panther Burns. Two singles, "Sway" b/w "Where the Rio Dolorosa Flows" and "Me & My Chauffeur Blues" b/w "Whistle Blower Blues," were recorded while on the tour and were released by Org Music. Both singles feature Monterosso on guitar.

In July 2017, Falco entered Sam Phillips Recording Service to record the holiday-themed album A Tav Falco Christmas, with Monterosso producing, arranging, and playing guitar. Watt and Dammit participated in the recording, playing bass and drums respectively. The album was released on vinyl LP in the US by Org Music on Record Store Day Black Friday, 24 November 2017. The Los Angeles Times called it "gloriously demented enough to act as a tonic for anyone who can't bear the thought of another dose of sugary sentimentality." A track from the album, "Santa Claus is Back in Town," was included on the 2021 digital compilation album XO for the Holidays, Vol. X.

In April 2018, Falco recorded the sessions that would become the album Cabaret of Daggers at Terminal 2 Studio in Rome, with Monterosso producing and playing guitar once again. Cabaret of Daggers was released by Org Music on limited edition yellow vinyl on Record Store Day November 23, and on black vinyl and digital formats November 30. Monterosso also played guitar on Tav Falco's Panther Burns' 2018 "Contamination" tour.

Tav Falco's Panther Burns celebrated its fortieth anniversary in 2019 with a US tour. Dubbed the "40th Anniversary Howl," the tour took place in May and June of that year, with its prime show taking place 21 May in Memphis at Lafayette's Music Room. Monterosso played guitar on this tour. Monterosso performed with Falco and British television and radio personality Jools Holland on BBC Radio 2's The Jools Holland Show on 15 December 2019.

In 2020, during the COVID-19 pandemic, Falco began a musical collaboration with Mike Watt at the latter's suggestion. The project developed into a five-song EP entitled Club Car Zodiac, which featured Watt, Toby Dammit, and Argentine surf guitarist Didi Wray amongst others. Monterosso produced, arranged, and played guitar on the album. Club Car Zodiac is released as a purple vinyl 12" 45 rpm EP by Org Music on Record Store Day Black Friday, 26 November 2021.

In 2022, Tav Falco's Panther Burns undertook an extensive US Tour, which began on 25 August in San Francisco and featured dates in 34 US cities. Monterosso backed Falco on this tour, along with bassist Guiseppe Sangirardi and drummer Walter Brunetti. Monterosso's trio opened for Falco as an instrumental act, playing songs from Monterosso's recent album Take It Away along with other cover songs.

On the Nashville stop of their 2022 US Tour, Tav Falco Panther Burns recorded a live-in-the-studio session at Bridgestone Arena Studios. The session was recorded 27 September 2022, and featured Monterosso on lead guitar and backing vocals. The sessions were first broadcast as "Cabaret of Daggers Special" on SiriusXM Outlaw Country (Channel 60). Org Music then released the sessions as the album Nashville Sessions: Live at Bridgestone Arena Studios in 2023. Soon after the release of Nashville Sessions, Tav Falco Panther Burns embarked on yet another US tour, entitled the "Ride the Snake Tour". Monterosso played guitar on this tour as well.

In late 2023, Monterosso began work on production of a Tav Falco solo album entitled Desire on Ice. The album drew from previous Falco-penned original songs, reinterpreting the songs in new and unusual ways. Basic tracks for the album were recorded in February 2024 at Sam Phillips Recording Service in Memphis. Monterosso assembled a large set of celebrity guest musicians to appear on the album, including Jon Spencer (Jon Spencer Blues Explosion), The Reverend Horton Heat, Bobby Gillespie (Primal Scream / The Jesus and Mary Chain), and Ann Magnuson. Monterosso worked as a session musician on the album in addition to being its producer. Org Music released Desire on Ice on 12 September 2025 to positive reviews, including a 5/5 rating from Mojo magazine with a special inset, an 8/10 rating from Uncut with a full page writeup, and another 8/10 rating from Classic Rock.

== Personal life ==
In 2022, Monterosso performed for Pricilla Presley at the Theatre Memphis in the presence of then-Memphis mayor Jim Strickland and other government dignitaries. The same year, he received Certificate of Recognition from the Memphis City Council for outstanding contribution to the Memphis community.

Monterosso married Memphis native Kristin Linagen in January 2024. The couple were featured on the front cover of 8 February 2024 issue of the Memphis Flyer, along with a story detailing their meeting via a mutual friend and their engagement at the restaurant Sardi's in New York City.

== Discography ==
=== As solo performer ===
==== Studio albums ====
- Fui e Sono Eddie Redmount (2018; as Mario Monterosso & The Redmount Orchestra)
- Rockin' in Memphis Mario Monterosso, The Million Euro Quartet (2018; as Mario Monterosso with The Million Euro Quartet)
- Take It Away (2022)

==== Singles ====
- "Steady Girl" b/w "Waiting For a Beer" 7" single (2020)
- "Simple Song of Freedom" (2023; as Memphis Freedom Band)

==== Compilation appearances ====
- "Steady Girl" on Rockabilly Made in Italy Vol. 3 (2020)
- "Steady Girl" on Always Memphis Rock & Roll (2020)

=== With Tav Falco Panther Burns ===
- Command Performance (2015)
- "Me & My Chauffeur Blues" b/w "Whistle Blower Blues" 7" single (2016)
- "Sway" b/w "Where The Rio De Rosa Flows" 7" single (2016)
- Nashville Sessions: Live at Bridgestone Arena Studios (2023)

=== With Tav Falco ===
==== Studio albums ====
- A Tav Falco Christmas (2017)
- Cabaret of Daggers (2018)
- Club Car Zodiac 12" 45 rpm EP (2021)
- Desire on Ice (2025)

==== Compilation appearances ====
- XO for the Holidays, Vol. X (2021)

=== With Dale Watson ===
==== Studio albums ====
- Dale Watson Presents The Memphians (2021)

==== Compilations ====
- "Hernando's Swang" on Still Rocking: Rockabilly Italia (2021)

=== Other album appearances ===
- The Rhino Rockers We Say Stop 12" 33 rpm single (1992)
- The Hot Road Band HRB (1997)
- Red Mount Blues Band Live at Ciminiere (2002)
- Keyrthsand Out of Jail (2009)
- Emiliano Pari A New Morning (2011)
- Red Mount Trio Seven Year Blues (2011)
- Marco Rinalduzzi 1 + 90 (2011)
- The Midnight Ramblers A Tribute to The Rolling Stones (2012)
- B.B. & The Red Cats Burning Life (2014)
- Francesca Fabris So Close to You (2015)
- The Muddy Roosters The Muddy Roosters (2015)
- Don Diego Trio Greetings from Austin (2017)
- Don Diego Trio Cowboy Jazz Experience (2019)
- Rob Moss & Skin-Tight Skin We’ve Come Back to Rock 'n' Roll (2020)
- The Brandon Cunning Band Halfway There (2020)
- Michela Musolino La Notti Triunfanti (2022)
- Jason D. Williams Lucky Ol' Son (2022)
- Mick Kolassa For The Feral Heart (2022)
