= Nashville Sessions: Live at Bridgestone Arena Studios =

Live album by Tav Falco Panther Burns
- Released: 23 June 2023 (vinyl) 24 March 2023 (digital)
- Recorded: 27 September 2022
- Studio: Bridgestone Arena Studios, Nashville
- Genre: Rock and roll, rockabilly, psychedelic rock
- Length: 46:16 (vinyl), 49:47 (digital)
- Label: Frenzi / Org Music
- Producer: Jeremy Tepper

Tav Falco Panther Burns chronology
| Command Performance (2015) | Nashville Sessions: Live at Bridgestone Arena Studios (2023) |

Tav Falco chronology
| Club Car Zodiac (2022) | Nashville Sessions: Live at Bridgestone Arena Studios (2023) | Desire on Ice (2025) |

Nashville Sessions: Live at Bridgestone Arena Studios is a live-in-the-studio album by Tav Falco Panther Burns. The album is the official release of a session recorded at Bridgestone Arena Studios in Nashville during the band's 2022 US Tour and broadcast by satellite radio station Sirius XM Outlaw Country later the same year. The recording session features a wide variety of tracks spanning much of band frontman Tav Falco's career, along with the debut recording of Falco's rendition of "Treat Me Nice", which was previously recorded by Elvis Presley. Nashville Sessions was released by Org Music in 2023 on digital and vinyl editions to positive reviews, and was followed by yet another US tour in 2023 called the "Ride the Snake Tour".

== Background ==
In 2022, Tav Falco Panther Burns conducted a 34-date US tour in the wake of Tav Falco's (at the time) most recent solo studio release, an EP entitled Club Car Zodiac. The tour was the band's first US tour in three years, starting in San Francisco on 25 August and finishing on 2 October in Lafayette LA.

On the Nashville stop of their 2022 US Tour, Tav Falco Panther Burns recorded a live-in-the-studio session at Bridgestone Arena Studios at the invitation of SiriusXM Outlaw Country program director Jeremy Tepper. The session was recorded 27 September 2022, and featured numerous tracks from the band’s then-current set list. The set list included songs spanning much of Falco's career, focusing on tracks from Shadow Dancer (1995) and Command Performance (2015) but reaching all the way back to the 1984 Now! LP. Also featured is a cover of "Treat Me Nice", a song recorded by Elvis Presley, which Falco had never recorded previously.

The sessions were first broadcast as "Cabaret of Daggers Special" on SiriusXM Outlaw Country (Channel 60), on 29 October 2022. Org Music then released the sessions as the album Nashville Sessions: Live at Bridgestone Arena Studios on digital in March 2023, followed by a vinyl LP release in 23 June of that year.

The digital edition of the album features between-song commentary from Falco, which was cut from the LP due to format limitations. An access code to the "Tav Falco Panther Burns 2022 US Tour Diary" was included on the labels of the LP for vinyl buyers. The album art features photography by Alison Camus from the band's 26 August 2022 performance at The Airliner in Los Angeles.

== Reception ==
The Vinyl District gave Nashville Sessions album an A− rating, praising the album as "another gem in the crown of a king," with their only criticism being the lack of audience presence between the songs. The Memphis Flyer called the album "the perfect entr[y] into Falco’s world," complimenting the band's "heavier" approach and stating that "the band's focus and drive" was "a welcome evolution, inspiring Falco to sing with more authority than ever." The French magazine Sun Burns Out rated the album a 9.2 out of 10, calling it "one of the best live records we've heard in the last ten years."

Soon after the release of Nashville Sessions, Tav Falco Panther Burns embarked on yet another US tour, entitled the "Ride the Snake Tour". This time the tour started on 28 September 2023 in New Haven, Connecticut, and finished in Los Angeles on 21 October 2023.

== Track listing ==
Vinyl LP Edition:

Side one
| No. | Title | Length |
|---|---|---|
| 1. | "Intro" | 0:54 |
| 2. | "About Marie Laveau" (from Command Performance, 2015) | 4:34 |
| 3. | "Sway" (from Shadow Dancer, 1995) | 2:58 |
| 4. | "Have I the Right" (from Shadow Dancer) | 3:09 |
| 5. | "He'll Have to Go" (from Disappearing Angels, 1996) | 2:37 |
| 6. | "Born Too Late" (from Shadow Dancer) | 2:49 |
| 7. | "Me and my Chauffeur Blues" (from Command Performance) | 3:42 |
| 8. | "Strange (Libertango)" (from Cabaret of Daggers, 2018) | 3:46 |

Side two
| No. | Title | Length |
|---|---|---|
| 9. | "Treat Me Nice" (previously unrecorded) | 2:29 |
| 10. | "Go On Home" (from Life Sentence, 1991) | 2:16 |
| 11. | "The Ballad of Rue de la Lune" (from Conjurations: Séance for Deranged Lovers, 2010) | 4:23 |
| 12. | "Cuban Rebel Girl" (first performed on Now!, 1984) | 2:58 |
| 13. | "Bangkok" (from Command Performance) | 2:02 |
| 14. | "Master of Chaos" (from Command Performance) | 5:09 |
| 15. | "Girl After Girl" (first performed on Midnight in Memphis: 10th Anniversary Live LP, 1989) | 2:30 |
| Total length: | | 46:16 |

Digital edition:

| No. | Title | Length |
|---|---|---|
| 1. | "Intro" | 0:54 |
| 2. | "About Marie Laveau" | 4:34 |
| 3. | "Sway" | 3:05 |
| 4. | "Have I the Right" | 3:13 |
| 5. | "He'll Have to Go" | 2:41 |
| 6. | "Born Too Late" | 3:05 |
| 7. | "Me and my Chauffeur Blues" | 4:19 |
| 8. | "Strange (Libertango)" | 3:44 |
| 9. | "Treat Me Nice" | 2:51 |
| 10. | "Go On Home" | 2:25 |
| 11. | "The Ballad of Rue de la Lune" | 4:50 |
| 12. | "Cuban Rebel Girl" | 3:04 |
| 13. | "Bangkok intro" | 0:37 |
| 14. | "Bangkok" | 2:03 |
| 15. | "Master of Chaos intro" | 0:30 |
| 16. | "Master of Chaos" | 5:09 |
| 17. | "Girl After Girl" | 2:43 |
| Total length: | | 49:47 |

== Personnel ==
Tav Falco Panther Burns

- Tav Falco – lead vocals, guitar
- Mario Monterosso – lead guitar, backing vocals
- Giuseppe Sangirardi – bass, backing vocals
- Walter Brunetti – drums, backing vocals

Additional personnel

- Jeremy Tepper – session producer (for SiriusXM)
- Stephen Turney – mixing
- Kern Haug – mastering
- Alyson Camus – cover image
- David Gasten, Tav Falco – liner notes
- Mitch Rossiter – layout
- Andrew Rossiter – executive producer
