= Tav Falco's Panther Burns =

American rock band

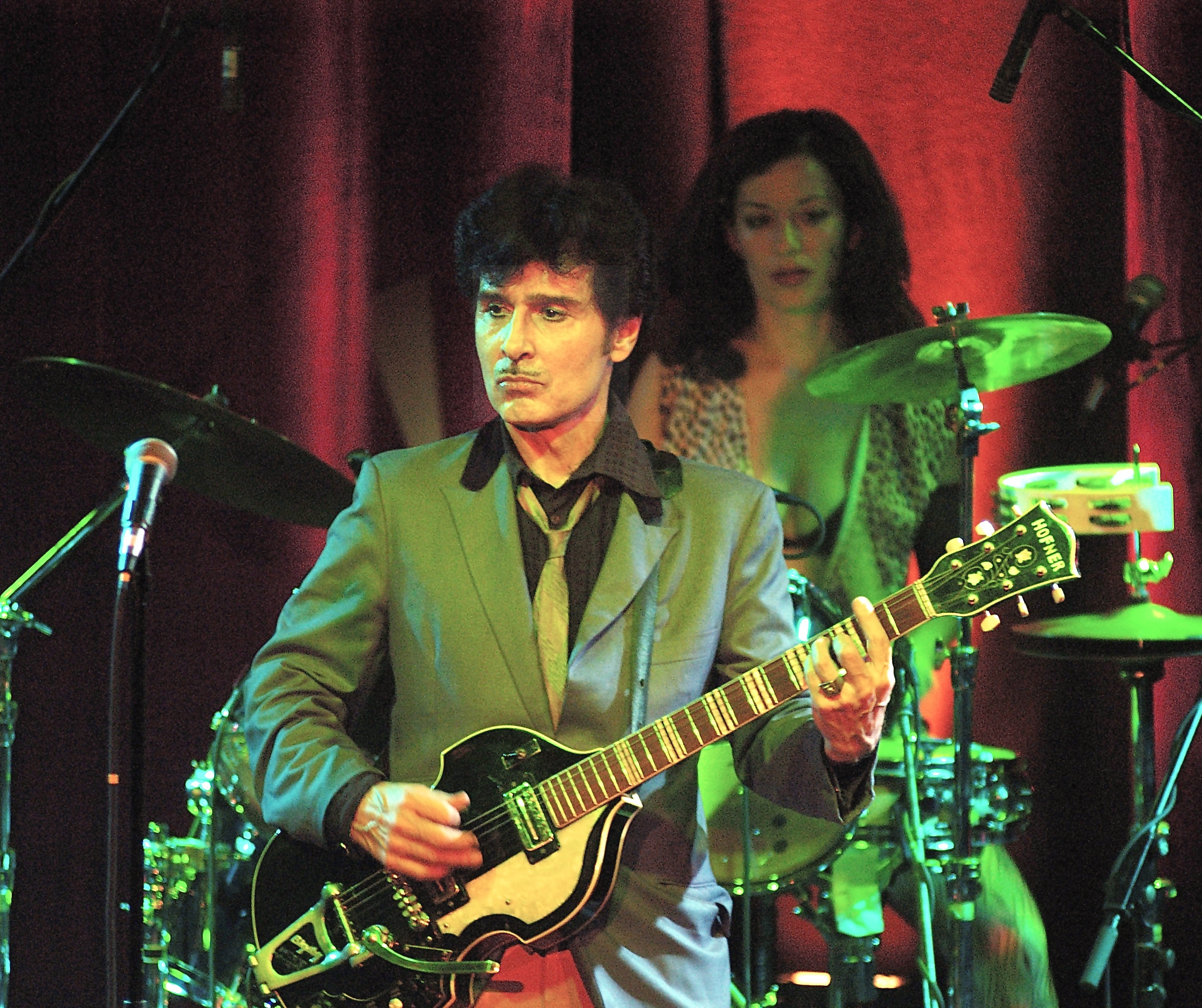
- Live in St. Gallen, Switzerland, 2004: Falco with drummer Pizzorno

Background information
- Origin: Memphis, Tennessee, U.S.
- Genres: Rockabilly; blues rock; gothic country
- Years active: 1979–present
- Labels: Frenzi; Org Music; Stag-O-Lee; Bang; New Rose; In the Red, Au Go Go; Last Call; Triple X; Upstart; Sympathy for the Record Industry; Rough Trade
- Members: Tav Falco; Mario Monterosso; Giuseppe Sangirardi; Walter Brunetti
- Past members: See below for full list
- Website: Tav Falco Official Website

Tav Falco's Panther Burns, sometimes shortened to (The) Panther Burns, is a rock band originally from Memphis, Tennessee, United States, led by Tav Falco. They are best known for having been part of a set of bands emerging in the late 1970s and early 1980s who helped nationally popularise the blending of blues, country, and other American traditional music styles with rock music among groups playing in alternative music and punk music venues of the time. The earliest and most renowned of these groups to imbue these styles with expressionist theatricality and primitive spontaneity were The Cramps, largely influenced by rockabilly music. Forming just after them in 1979, Panther Burns drew on obscure country blues music, Antonin Artaud's works like The Theatre and Its Double, beat poetry, and Marshall McLuhan's media theories for their early inspiration. Alongside groups like The Cramps and The Gun Club, Panther Burns is also considered a representative of the Southern Gothic-tinged roots music revival scene.

After forming Tav Falco's Panther Burns and making their first recordings in Memphis, the group soon evolved as a rotating crew of additional musicians hailing mostly from Memphis, New York, and New Orleans. Falco moved Paris and later to Vienna, at which time he began working more with European musicians.

== Background and early history ==
In 1977 and 1979, Alex Chilton, attracted by The Cramps' feral, flamboyant rockabilly style, had brought them to Memphis to record sessions he produced that were later released as Gravest Hits and Songs the Lord Taught Us. Chilton had initiated the development of a rockabilly and country-tinged alternative rock music scene in Memphis, beginning with his Cramps sessions and his off-kilter Like Flies on Sherbert sessions recorded in 1978 through August 1979, following a stint working in New York's CBGB punk rock scene as a solo artist after the breakup of Big Star. This New York period had somewhat converted him to a turbulent and chaotic "punk performance ethos", according to Ross Johnson, writing in The Memphis Flyer. The Cramps sessions were the catalysts inspiring some of the young musicians who eventually helped launch Panther Burns to first start performing in public. Future Panther Burns drummer Johnson first performed publicly in a group called The Yard Dogs led by Alex Chilton in the summer of 1978; he made his first recording session appearance on Like Flies on Sherbert, drumming and bantering off-the-cuff, comical lyrics to "Baron of Love". This Chilton album is sometimes panned in retrospective reviews today by writers expecting Big Star's chiming guitars and tight, power pop recordings, but at the time the album came out, it was praised by critic Robert Christgau and was influential among young Memphis alternative musicians breaking out of the late 1970s era of disco music and slick, mainstream radio rock and starting to create their own punk rock/garage music scene unrestrained by industry dogma.

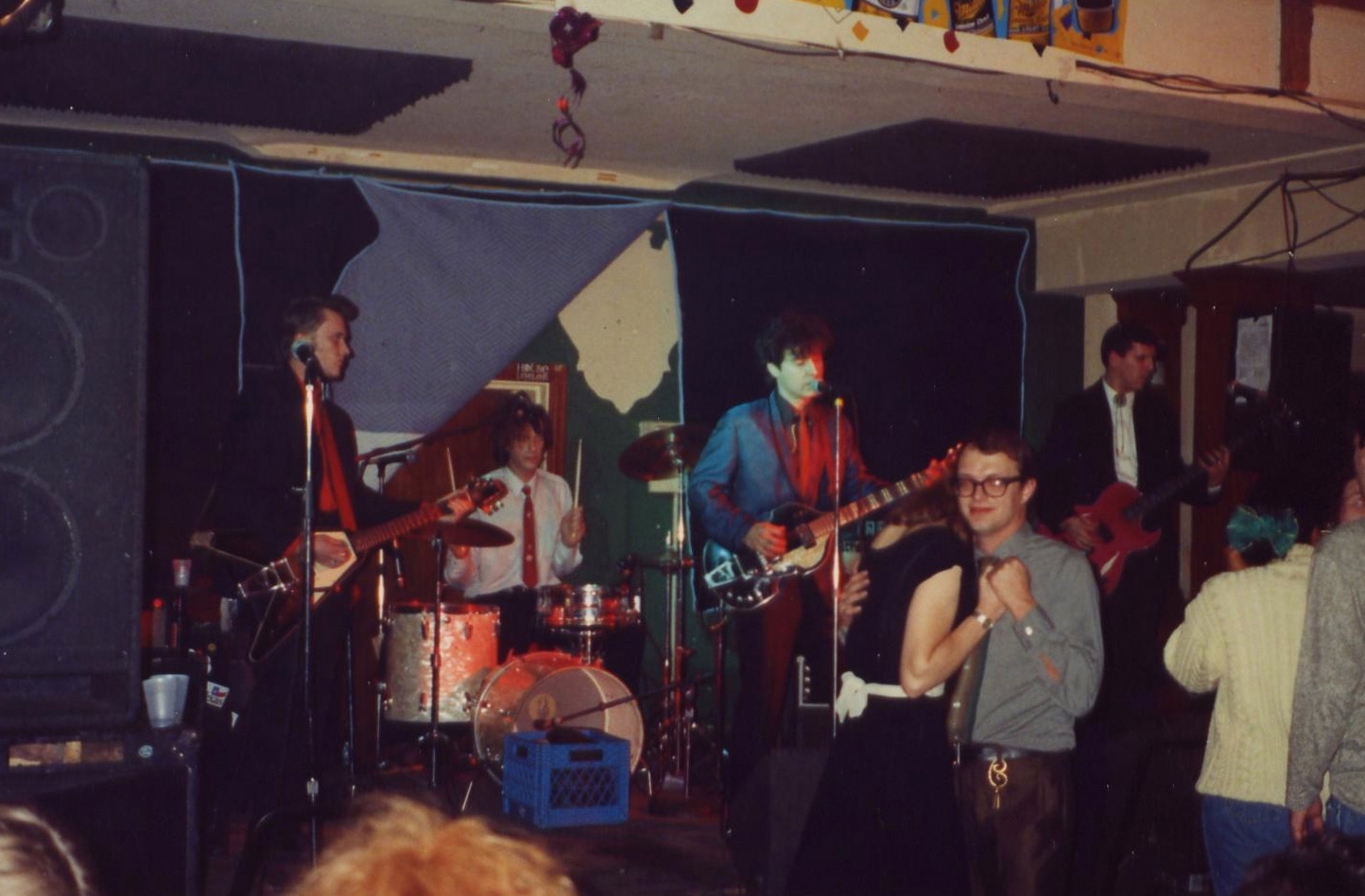
Tav Falco & the Panther Burns playing in New Orleans, 1993

Falco had focused his 1970s work on video and photographic documentation of blues performers and local culture in the Memphis area with fellow videographer Randall Lyon, in a partnership they called TeleVista Projects, Inc. Chilton, who first encountered Falco while Lyon and Falco were videotaping some of the Sherbert sessions, formally met Falco a couple of months later after witnessing his self-described "Art-Action Happening" during an October 1978 Mud Boy and the Neutrons "Tennessee Waltz" event in Memphis, at which Falco, untrained in music theory, surprised the audience by blowing a police whistle and chainsawing a guitar on stage halfway through a haywire rendition of Lead Belly's "Bourgeois Blues".

Falco's association with Chilton and a small circle of record-collecting musicians helped deepen their shared, longstanding interest in the Blues form. Chilton became inspired to work more with his Blues and Soul roots, after having temporarily been focused more on rockabilly and country music by the late 1970s. At the same time, The Memphis Flyer piece viewed the origin of Chilton's interest in forming the band as stemming from a desire to find "enthusiastic amateurs to play with" in Memphis, due to his recent exposure to Manhattan's budding punk rock music scene. "We were inept and offensive — just what Alex was looking for", wrote Johnson.

After Chilton completed the Like Flies on Sherbert recordings (for which Falco created some cover art graphics), Tav Falco's Panther Burns group was formed in February 1979 in Memphis by Falco (vocals, guitar) with Chilton (lead guitar/drums/backing vocals), Ross Johnson (drums), and Eric Hill (synthesiser). In the first couple of years Rick Ivy (trumpet), Jim Dickinson (piano), Vincent Wrenn (synthesizer), Ron Miller (bass), Jim Duckworth (guitar/drums), and Jim Sclavunos (drums), soon joined to play important roles. The group took its name from the Panther Burn plantation south of Greenville, Mississippi. The town, in turn, had taken the name in reference to a wild cat whose raids and nocturnal shrieks had so disturbed area residents in the 19th century that they set a canebrake on fire to keep it at bay after all attempts to trap or kill it had failed; the lore of the elusive animal shaking up a sleepy planters' hamlet appealed to the band.

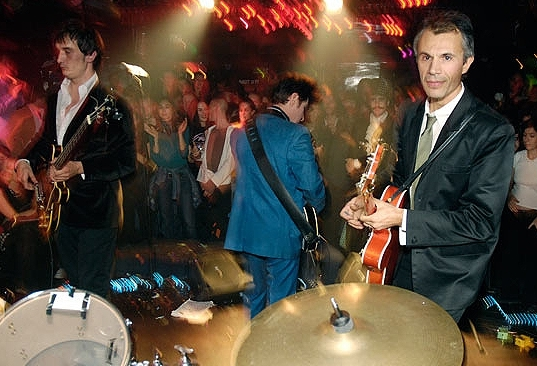
A 2006 photo from a Paris concert (left to right): Laurent "Lo" Lanouzière, band leader Tav Falco (back to camera), Grégoire "Cat" Garrigues.

The attention Chilton's early presence brought the band led to an increased interest in blues music, along with the already emerging Cramps-influenced rockabilly interest, in Memphis' alternative music scene at that time. Falco's initial inclusive approach of mixing enthusiastic players without formal musical training together with professional musicians was in tune with those of noted primitive experimenters Half Japanese and the 1970s East Village alternative music movement of performers like Talking Heads, James Chance and the Contortions, and Klaus Nomi in which visual artists and musicians formed bands together. In the beginning years of the band Falco told writers that because of his unschooled musical background, he represented "the possibility of anyone performing who wants to". Though confounding the expectations of some listeners, these musicians considered restoring a sense of unbridled enthusiasm to creative work to be more important than conforming to sterile, rigid industry standards, as reflected in the name choice for the small recording label moniker Falco soon adopted to release and co-release the group's future recordings: Frenzi.

== Performance and recording notes ==
As interest in the band grew, Panther Burns soon played early gigs in Memphis and other cities, horrifying the host of a Memphis morning television talk show on which they performed. During the talk show performance, Lyon simultaneously encoded and transmitted an experimental, live, slow-scan feed to experimental artist groups OPEN SPACE in Victoria, Center for New Art Activities in New York, and RELAY in San Francisco. Falco explained to the disgusted host that the group was merely a "neo-rumorist orchestra" for a TeleVista experiment, creating what he termed an "anti-environment" to make visible cultural treasures and older, local performers overlooked in the daily environment by mainstream society and the establishment.

The album cover of Behind the Magnolia Curtain, the band's debut album, recorded in 1981

The band's early happening-styled, so-called "art-action" performances at downtown Memphis cotton lofts at the time frequently included waggish projected images, like the group's trademark burning panther image, trained on the musicians, harking back to Velvet Underground-era, psychedelic days of the 1960s. A screen-print artist since the 1970s, Falco promoted many of the early 1980s local live shows by using hand-screen-printed posters which band members and friends helped him create and paste around midtown Memphis. They performed many of these Memphis concerts at local new music dive The Well (later called Antenna Club) with other area bands of the period. They also opened for The Cramps and played double bills with The Gun Club during this period in cities including New Orleans, New York, and Los Angeles. In the early 1980s they performed in an anti-nuclear rally with Allen Ginsberg at The Peppermint Lounge in New York. Reactions to the cacophonous, disjointed, amateurish side of the group's early performances varied from enthusiasm to disparaging ridicule. In 1980, New Orleans writer Bunny Matthews, explaining that he enjoyed the group's ability to put its audience "through changes", drolly summed up the experience: "No one is ever going to attend a Panther Burns recital and leave with mixed feelings".

Behind the Magnolia Curtain, the group's first album, was recorded in 1981 and released on the British Rough Trade Records label in 1982. The album featured on some tracks, including "Bourgeois Blues", an appearance by a small, marching drum corps that included blues artist Jessie Mae Hemphill, who had participated in her grandfather's Northern Mississippi Fife and drum corps groups as a child. The contrast between the strong, military beats of the drum corps dueling with Falco's occasionally out-of-sync vocals resulted in the wild, blues-rock chaos of songs on the album like the frenetic "Bourgeois Blues".

"We were thrown off quite a few stages during that period", wrote Johnson. "Though we initially enjoyed the effect we had on club audiences, somewhere along the way we tried to clean up our sound". The recording was followed by the slicker rockabilly revival style of Blow Your Top, without Chilton's participation, and in 1984, the Jim Dickinson-produced Sugar Ditch Revisited album was recorded, featuring a more subdued playing style by Chilton along with New Orleans bassist René Coman. That year, following a brief tour opening for The Clash before irritable college audiences impatient for the main act, Chilton stopped touring regularly with the group to resume his increasingly minimalist solo touring and recording career. Chilton's restrained, evolving solo style was beginning to diverge from his previously fiery, strident Panther Burns guitar style that had often featured reverb and feedback; however, he continued to produce several of their later albums.

=== Transition to less primitive performance style ===
Since the more refined productions of Sugar Ditch Revisited and 1987's The World We Knew, the band has concentrated less on raw, primitive sounds than in its early years. The group has developed into a combo working more with the feel and subtleties of the genres it explores, including tango and roots-oriented styles, with occasional forays into deranged, garage blues, as heard in Panther Phobia or in the frenzied guitar work performed in some of the 1980s and 1990s live shows by New Orleans musician George Reinecke, as also heard on Red Devil. The main constant in the varied work remains Falco's provocative vocals and wordplay.

1995 band lineup on Shadow Dancer (left to right): Tammo Lüers, Jim Sclavunos, Tav Falco, Kai Eric

Over the years, the group has recorded and toured with different lineups featuring a mix of energetic, alternative musicians working at times alongside seasoned rock and roll, soul, and jazz veterans to create its howling sounds, always centered around the presence of vocalist Falco. Panther Burns occasionally opened for major punk rock acts in the 1980s, appearing on double bills with some of their older heroes like Cordell Jackson, Jessie Mae Hemphill, and rockabilly great Charlie Feathers in the same time period, but usually headlined its own gigs at small clubs across the U.S., Canada, and Europe.

Venues the group has played at during its career have ranged from no-wave clubs in the East Village to New Jersey hardcore punk pits, music heritage festivals, alternative rock clubs, the Ottawa Bluesfest, Central Park Conservatory, and many others. In the early 2000s, the group began to play mostly in Europe due to Falco's relocation there. A 2006 minitour of Europe and the United States featured the main lineup from the previous several years performing with Falco: Roman drummer Giovanna Pizzorno with Parisians Grégoire Garrigues on guitar and Laurent Lo on bass.

Panther Burns have released a number of recordings through the years on indie rock labels like New Rose Records (France), In the Red, Au Go Go Records (Australia), Last Call Records (France), Triple X, Upstart, and Sympathy for the Record Industry. The band's recordings have included raucous, yet controlled studio albums produced by Chilton and sometimes Dickinson; a live 10th anniversary show album was produced in 1989 by longtime group guitarist Ron Easley, followed the next year by a studio album, Return of the Blue Panther, produced by former group bassist Coman. Coman, a jazz musician who leads The Iguanas rock group of New Orleans, recorded the album with guitarist Reinecke at the mixing board.

The group has also recorded a tango-oriented album, a live concert mini-album, and a lo-fi studio album with Doug Easley of Easley McCain Recording. Among the group's early recording engineers were Ardent Studios' John Hampton, as well as former Sun Records session musicians Stan Kessler and Roland Janes of Phillips Recording.

In August–September 2014, Falco recorded an album in Rome, Italy's Exit Studios. The album, titled Command Performance, was produced by Panther Burns guitarist Mario Monterosso and released in 2015 on the UK label Twenty Stone Blatt Records, with distribution by Proper Records.

Also in 2014, Stag-O-Lee Records (Germany) compiled a double album of Falco's favorites from his personal music collection, released as Tav Falco's Wonderful World Of Musical & Exotic Obscurities. Falco contributed to the varied artists album a liner notes essay and a Panther Burns song called "Real Cool Trash," which The Wire likened to "the rock 'n' roll energy" of The Cramps. The Wire described the album styles as ranging from rockabilly to "far-flung genres" that include "tangos, waltzes, and concertina music."

In 2022, Tav Falco's Panther Burns undertook an extensive US Tour, which began in August 25 in San Francisco and featured dates in 34 US cities. On the Nashville stop of the tour, the band recorded a live-in-the-studio session at Bridgestone Arena Studios. The session was recorded 27 September 2022, and was initially broadcast as "Cabaret of Daggers Special" on SiriusXM Outlaw Country (Channel 60). Org Music then released the sessions as the album Nashville Sessions: Live at Bridgestone Arena Studios in 2023. Soon after the release of Nashville Sessions, Tav Falco Panther Burns embarked on yet another US tour, entitled the "Ride the Snake Tour". This time the tour started on 28 September 2023 in New Haven, Connecticut, and finished in Los Angeles on 21 October 2023.

In 2024, Falco recorded the solo album Desire on Ice, which featured current Panther Burns members Mario Monterosso, Giueseppe Sangirardi and Walter Brunetti as session musicians, as well and former Panther Burns members Jimmy Rip, Jim Sclavunos and René Coman as guest musicians. Monterosso produced the album. Org Music released the album on 12 September 2025 to positive reviews, including a 5/5 rating from Mojo magazine with a special inset, an 8/10 rating from Uncut with a full page writeup, and another 8/10 rating from Classic Rock.

== Musical style ==
According to the band, Panther Burns is "a Southern Gothic, psychedelic country band influenced by Memphis music styles". The original band lineup featured two guitars, synthesizer, and drums, later usually omitting keyboards or synthesizers at live shows. The group's somewhat experimental recordings have embraced and deconstructed a number of influences and genres, including rockabilly, blues rock and Southern Gothic.

With his signature Höfner fuzz-tone guitar and a stage presence characterized by his Argentine-styled pompadour, pencil moustache, smoking jacket, and urbane manner, Falco infused his shows with theatrical antics and a reverence for the originators of country blues and rockabilly. The band's assorted song subjects and album photography themes have included Memphis scenery, Carroll Cloar's Panther Bourne painting, the occasional reference to historical figures like American rampage murderer Charles Starkweather, motorcycle imagery, denizens of Memphis neighborhoods, tango imagery, and blithe introspection, among other themes.

Falco's treatment of the blues classic "Bourgeois Blues" adds a line from Ginsberg's famous beat poem "Howl". In a 1984 interview discussing his anti-environment concept and music, he said that many outstanding, but lesser known blues and rockabilly artists were "treated like the idiot wind". Similarly, he continued, "the beat writers and theorists like Antonin Artaud were treated like they were crazy. It wasn't until he died that everyone realized he was a genius". Two of his originals, "Agitator Blues" and "Panther Phobia Manifesto", evinced playful humor and a left-leaning, Utopian anarchist political stance. In "Panther Phobia Manifesto", Falco referenced lines from influences as disparate as William S. Burroughs, Screamin' Jay Hawkins, Howlin' Wolf, Rod Serling, French psychedelic band The Dum Dum Boys, and Dadaist poet Louis Aragon, in wishing a "huge firedamp explosion" to closed-minded members of society who blindly follow the dictates of the establishment. Proclaiming that everywhere the Panther Burns go, they are greeted with derision, he riffed from Aragon, "Laugh your fill, the Panther Burns are the ones who always hold out a hand to the enemy".

The group's wide-ranging styles have included Argentine tango music, country music, rockabilly, R&B, soul music, novelty tunes, early rock and roll, country blues, and pop standards of the 1950s and 1960s like Frank Sinatra's "The World We Knew", among others. Set lists have included mutated covers of songs originally performed by such diverse artists as J. Blackfoot, Doc Pomus, Bobby Lee Trammell, Gene Pitney, Reverend Horton Heat, Jessie Mae Hemphill, R. L. Burnside, Mack Rice, and Allen Page (of the small 1950s Moon Records label helmed by early rock-and-roll producer/songwriter Cordell Jackson), among others.

The earliest description the band gave itself on a concert poster read simply: "Rock'n'Roll". Media confusion in categorizing led the band to eventually invent its own self-descriptive terms, such as "panther music" and "backwoods ballroom", also at times calling its tumultuous performance style "art damage".

== Performing personnel ==
=== Current lineup ===
- Tav Falco: lead vocals, guitar (1979–current)
- Mario Monterosso: guitar, bass, producer (2014–current)
- Giuseppe Sangirardi: bass (2016–current)
- Walter Brunetti: drums (2018–current)

=== Past members ===
- Perry Michael Allen—keyboards, backing vocals: 1995
- David Berger—drums: 2002
- Barri Bob—percussion, rhythm guitar: some 1980s gigs
- Orazio Brando—guest guitarist: 2005
- William Brandt; (also of "Beyond Einstein's Eulipion Bats") drums 1988 including live recording "Live at Vienna Messeplast" 24 May 1988
- Roy Brewer—violin: 1980s and 1990s
- Benny Carter—drums: 1994
- Grégoire Cat (real name: Grégoire Garrigues)—lead guitar: early 2000s onwards
- Ben Cauley (also of The Bar-Kays)—trumpet: 1990s
- Raymond Cavaioli—lead guitar: some 1980s gigs
- Alex Chilton (aka L X Chilton and Axel Chitlin)—lead guitar: 1979–early 1980s and occasional appearances thereafter; produced several of the albums
- Riccardo Colasante—drums: 2016
- Rene Coman (also of The Iguanas/New Orleans)—bass: early to mid–1980s and occasionally thereafter
- Francesco D'Agnolo—keyboards: 2015
- Toby Dammit—drums: 2015 (guest appearances in 2016, 2018)
- Peter Dark (also of Bellmer Dolls, real name: Peter Mavrogeorgis)—guitar: early 2000s, 2011 onwards
- Jim Dickinson—producer and keyboardist: occasionally 1980s and 1990s
- Peter Dopita—singing saw: 1991
- Jim Duckworth (also of The Gun Club)—drums: 1981; lead guitar: early 1980s, 1989
- Doug Easley—bass: occasionally, including 1989 live album
- Ron Easley (aka Durand Mysterion; also of the Country Rockers)—lead guitar: 1980s and 1990s sporadically; producer: 1989
- James Enck (later of Linda Heck and the Train Wreck)—lead guitar: 1984, 1991; bass on "Cuban Rebel Girl" from the 1984 Now! cassette release
- Kai Eric (aka Red West)—bass: mid-1980s–2000 on most tours except some in the South U.S.
- Cyd Fenwick—backing vocals, dancing: 1979–1981
- Kitty Fires 1 (real name: Sue Easley)—backing vocals: 1984; Kitty Fires 2 (different woman)—guitar: 2000
- Bob Fordyce (also of the Odd Jobs)—drums: 1989
- Lorenzo Francocci—drums, percussion: 2015
- Doug Garrison (also of The Iguanas/New Orleans)—drums: 1996
- Diane Green (also of The Hellcats/Memphis and the Odd Jobs)—theatrics, tambourine, dancing: occasional 1980s appearances
- Alex Greene (also of Big Ass Truck and Reigning Sound)—organ: 1989–1990
- Stacy Hall and Dawn Hall—dancers: 1979
- Jim Harper—snare drum: 1981
- Mark Harrison—guitar: 1984–1985
- Linda Heck (later of Linda Heck and the Train Wreck)—bass: 1984
- Jessie Mae Hemphill (as part of the Tate County Mississippi Drum Corps)—snare drum: 1981
- Eric Hill—synthesizer: 1979–1980, 1989
- Douglas Hodges (aka Tall Cash)—drums: 2001–2002
- Teenie Hodges—lead guitar: 1990s
- Michael Hurtt (also of The Royal Pendletons)—bass: 1999
- Rick Ivy—trumpet, vocals: 1979
- Cathy Johnson—backing vocals, dancing: 1979–1981
- Ross Johnson—drums: since 1979 on a number of albums and live shows
- Amanda Jones—backing vocals: 1984
- Jules Jones—backing vocals in studio and live shows: 1979
- Via Kali—tango dancer at live shows: 2006 onwards
- Kye Kennedy—lead guitar: mid-1980s touring
- Gabriele Kepplinger—backing vocals: 1991
- Little Victor—guitar, harmonica: 2005
- Laurent Lanouzière—bass: 2002–onwards
- Michael Lo (real name: Michael Rafalowich)—bass: early 2000s, 2011–onwards
- Andrew Love (also of The Memphis Horns)—saxophone: 1990s
- Vickie Loveland—backing vocals: 1991
- Tammo Lüers—guitar: 1995
- Randall Lyon—theremin: 1991
- Olivier Manoury—bandoneon: 1995
- Bob Marbach—piano: 1991, 1995
- Lisa McGaughran (also of The Hellcats/Memphis including in one compilation as Lisa Burnette)—backing vocals, bass: 1984–1990
- Ron Miller—bass: early 1980s
- Billy Mitchell—drums: 2013
- Robert Palmer—clarinet: 1989
- Giovanna Pizzorno (also of The Hellcats/Memphis)—drums: first sporadic tours began 1986; steady member since the early 2000s; duet vocals: 2015
- Jon Ramos—bass: 2002
- George Reinecke (also of Busted Flush)—lead guitar: 1980s and 1990s
- Will Rigby (also of The dB's, Steve Earle) – drums: 1980, 1999
- Jimmy Ripp—guitar: 1983
- Roland Robinson—bass: 1992
- Kurt Ruleman—drums: 1984–1989
- Raffaele Santoro—keyboards: 2010 onwards
- Harris Scheuner—drums: 1989
- Jim Sclavunos—drums: since about 1982 on a few albums, beginning with Blow Your Top
- Jim Spake—saxophone: 1984, 1987, 1989, 1991, 1995, and occasional live appearances
- Brendan Lee Spengler—keyboards: 2000
- Ken Stringfellow—bass: 2011
- Nokie Taylor—trumpet: 1991, 1995
- Nina Tischler—backing vocals: 1991
- Lorette Velvette (real name: Lori Greene; also of The Hellcats/Memphis and The Kropotkins)—backing vocals: 1984–1990; guitar: 1984 briefly
- Mike Watt—bass: 2015 (guest appearances in 2016, 2018)
- Misty White (also of The Hellcats/Memphis and Alluring Strange)—drums: 1988
- Vincent Wrenn—synthesizer: 1979–1980
- Jack Yarber (aka Jack Oblivian)—bass, organ: 2000
- Abe Young—bass drum: 1981

== Discography ==
Title	Type	Year	Label	Notes
Studio Albums
She's the One to Blame	EP	1980	Frenzi	Re-issued on 7" vinyl by Sympathy For the Record Industry (1998) and Mighty Mouth Music (2012)
Behind the Magnolia Curtain	Full Length	1981	Frenzi/Rough Trade (UK)	Re-released 1994 and 2011
Blow Your Top	EP	1982	Animal Records (USA), Frenzi/Rough Trade (UK)	Re-issued 1987 by Fan Club Records
Now!	EP	1984	Frenzi	Initially released on cassette, later rereleased on vinyl
Sugar Ditch Revisited	EP	1985	Frenzi/New Rose (France)	Re-released 1994
Shake Rag	EP	1986	Frenzi/New Rose	Re-released 1994
The World We Knew	Full Length	1987	Frenzi/New Rose	Reissued 1992 by Triple X Records (US)
Red Devil	Full Length	1988	Frenzi/New Rose	Re-released 1994
Tav Falco Panther Burns	Box Set	1988	Frenzi/New Rose	Box set featuring four 7" singles. Eight songs total. Limited numbered edition of 5000.
Return of the Blue Panther	Full Length	1990	Frenzi/New Rose	
Surfside Date	EP	1990	Frenzi/Sympathy For the Records Industry (USA)	
Life Sentence	Full Length	1991	New Rose	Released in 1991 on Triple X Records (USA) as Life Sentence in the Cathouse
Shadow Dancer	Full Length	1995	Frenzi	Released by Upstart Records (USA, CD), Last Call Records (France, CD), Alternation/Intercord (Germany, CD), and Munster Records (France, LP)
Panther Phobia	Full Length	2000	Frenzi/In the Red Recordings (USA)	Released on LP and CD
Conjurations: Séance for Deranged Lovers	Full Length	2010	Frenzi	Released by Stag-O-Lee (Germany, CD), Bang! Records (France, LP), and Cosmodelic Records (USA, CD)
Command Performance	Full Length	2015	Twenty Stone Blatt (UK)	Distributed by Proper Records
Nashville Sessions: Live at Bridgestone Arena Studios	Full Length	2023	Org Music (USA)	Live-in-the-studio album initially recorded for broadcast on SiriusXM Outlaw Country. Recorded in one 90-minute session and features previously unrecorded track "Treat Me Nice."
Live Albums
Live Atlanta Metroplex 10-3-87	Full Length	1988	Calypso Now (Switzerland)	Cassette only, limited edition of 100 copies
Midnight in Memphis: 10th Anniversary Live LP	Full Length	1989	New Rose	Reissued in 1992 by Triple X Records
2 Sides of Tav Falco	10" LP	1996	Frenzi/Helter Skelter (Italy)	
Live aAt the Subsonic, France 10.2001	Full-Length	2002	Frenzi/Speed Records (France)	Released on LP and CD-R
Live in London	Full Length	2012	Frenzi/Stag-O-Lee (Germany)	Recorded live at the 100 Club; Released on 2x 10" LP and CD-R
Live at Vienna Messeplast 24 May 1988	Full Length	2015	Frenzi/Stag-O-Lee	MP3 only; original recording appeared as Disc 2 of Life Sentence In the Cathouse 2015 CD reissue
Singles
Live in Australia	7" single	1987	Au Go Go (Australia)	Live two-song single
Drop Your Mask	7" single	1987	New Rose	
Memphis Beat	7" single	1989	New Rose	
Love's Last Warning	CD maxi-single	1995	Frenzi/Alternation (Germany)	
"Administrator Blues" b/w "Real Cool Trash"	7" single	2009	Frenzi/Stag-O-Lee	
"Me & My Chauffeur Blues" b/w "Whistle Blower Blues"	7" single	2016	Frenzi/Org Music (USA)	Black Friday record store day 2016 exclusive; limited edition of 1000 copies
"Sway" b/w "Where the Rio De Rosa Flows"	7" single	2016	Frenzi/Org Music	Limited edition of 1000 copies
"Rock Me" b/w "Whistle Blower Blues"	7" single	2017	Space Case Records/Selection Records (USA)	Limited edition of 500 copies
Compilations
Behind the Magnolia Curtain/Blow Your Top	Full Length	1987	Fan Club (France)	2-on-1 reissue released in numerous editions and in several different countries, with Fan Club's being the first
Sol y Sombra	Full Length	1988	Marilyn (Spain)	Vinyl only release
Deep in the Shadows	Full Length	1994	Marilyn	
Love's Last Warning	Full Length	1996	Frenzi/Last Call Records (France)	
Shadow Angels and Disappearing Dancers	Full Length	1997	Munster (Spain)	2-on-1 reissue of Shadow Dancer (1995) and Tav Falco solo album Disappearing Angels (1996)
Sugar Ditch Revistited/Shake Rag	Full Length	2013	Stag-O-Lee	2-on-1 reissue
Hip Flask: An Introduction to Tav Falco & The Panther Burns	Full Length	2015	Frenzi	
Return of the Blue Panther + Midnight in Memphis	Double album	2015	Frenzi	2-on-1 reissue
