= Org Music =

- Founded: 2010
- Distributor: Secretly Distribution
- Genre: Jazz, alternative rock, indie rock, punk rock, rock and roll, soul, funk, country, hip-hop
- Country of origin: United States
- Location: Los Angeles
- Official website: orgmusic.com

Org Music is an American independent record label based in Los Angeles. The label releases vinyl reissues and new recordings across multiple genres, including jazz, rock, soul, funk, country and hip-hop.

Founded in 2010, Org Music's early releases included vinyl reissues from artists such as Tom Petty and the Heartbreakers, Nirvana and Sonic Youth. The label has also issued and partnered on projects with artists including Mike Watt (Minutemen / fIREHOSE / The Stooges), Chuck Dukowski (Black Flag), Josh Klinghoffer (Red Hot Chili Peppers / Pearl Jam), Tav Falco, and free jazz drummer William Hooker. Org Music has mounted multi-title reissue campaigns for the punk rock bands Bad Brains and Descendents, including alternate “Punk Note” editions with album artwork styled after classic jazz LP designs.

Org Music has partnered with legacy labels and archives such as Black Lion Records, Freedom Records, Sun Records, Brunswick Records, Westbound Records, Delicious Vinyl, and the George H. Buck Jr. (GHB) Jazz Foundation to restore and reissue catalog titles. A significant portion of the label's output is associated with Record Store Day, for which it has released numerous limited-edition titles. Org Music signed a worldwide distribution deal with Secretly Distribution in 2025.

== Background ==
Org Music is a Los Angeles-based independent record label known for high-quality vinyl reissues and other releases. The label began in 2010 as an offshoot of Original Recordings Group, and was handled largely by former Warner Music Group consultant Jeff Bowers. Org Music was formed to expand into rock, pop and alternative rock reissues, whereas its parent Original Recordings Group focused primarily on jazz and classical reissues.

While still a newly formed label, Org Music brought in Andrew Rossiter as general manager to oversee the label's day-to-day operations. Rossiter later became a partner in the label. Rossiter has described Eric Astor as one of the label partners. Astor is also the founder and partner of Furnace Record Pressing, a vinyl pressing plant in Alexandria, Virginia.

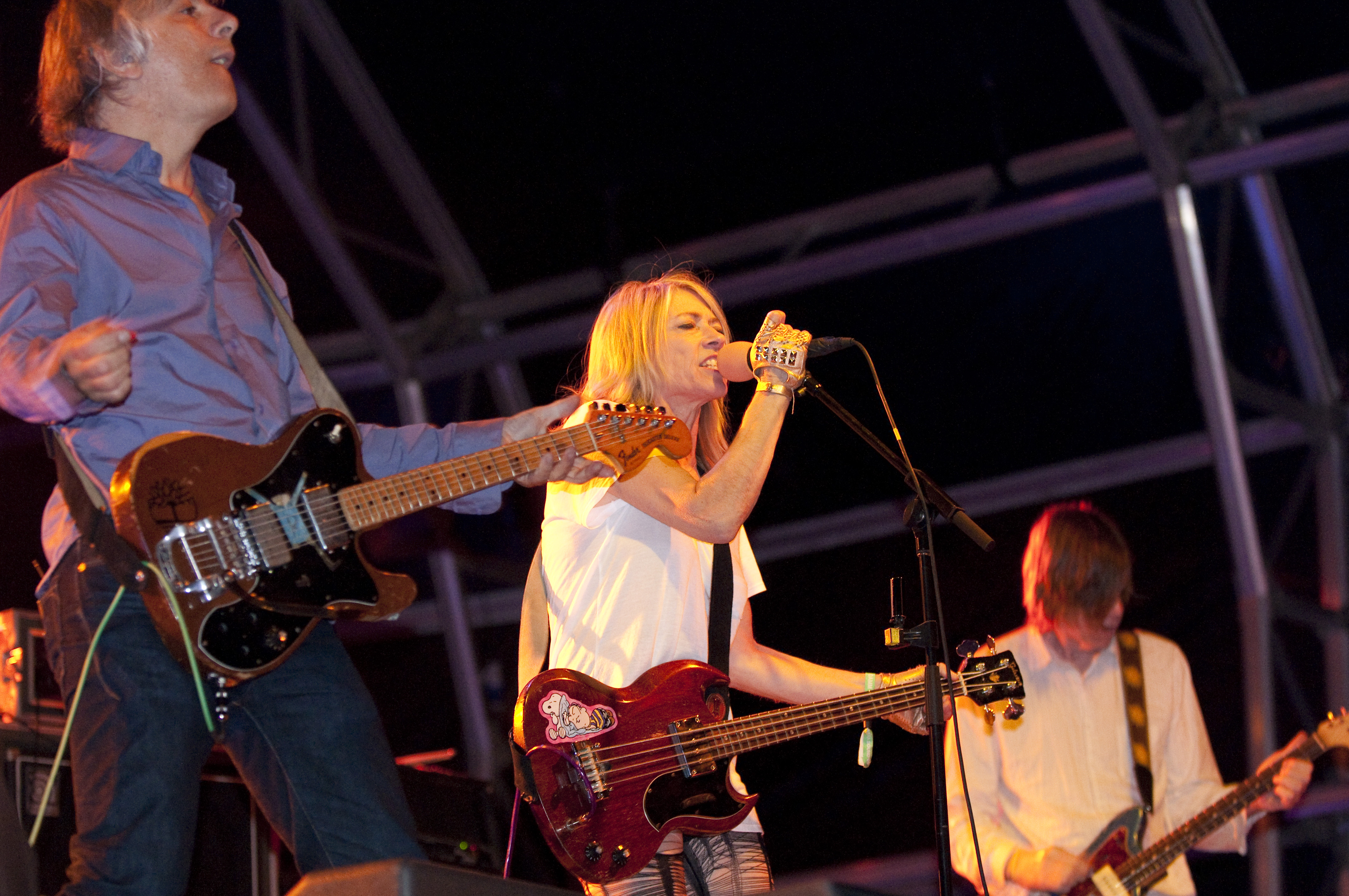
Sonic Youth in 2009. Vinyl reissues from the Sonic Youth catalog were among Org Music's earliest releases.

Among Org Music's earliest releases was a deluxe vinyl LP reissue of Tom Petty and the Heartbreakers' Damn the Torpedoes. The edition was released on two 180-gram LPs and included bonus tracks, including previously unreleased material. It was mastered by Chris Bellman at Bernie Grundman Mastering and pressed at Pallas in Germany. Other early offerings included vinyl reissues from the Nirvana and Sonic Youth catalogs.

== Partnerships and custodianship ==
=== Partnerships ===
==== Artist partnerships ====
Although Org Music was launched as a vinyl reissue label, it began engaging in artist partnerships early in its history.

In late 2010, the label approached Black Flag bassist Chuck Dukowski about working with the musician on his current projects. In 2012, Org Music released the Chuck Dukowski Sextet album Haunted, as well as the split 7-inch single "Sweet Honey Pie" b/w "My War," which paired the Sextet with Mike Watt and The Missingmen. The label later issued Exhumed, a double-LP compilation of Dukowski's pre-Black Flag sludge metal band Würm, as a Record Store Day Black Friday exclusive in 2018, followed in 2020 by the 7-inch single "Poison" b/w "Zero Sum," which featured Würm's first new studio recordings in nearly four decades.

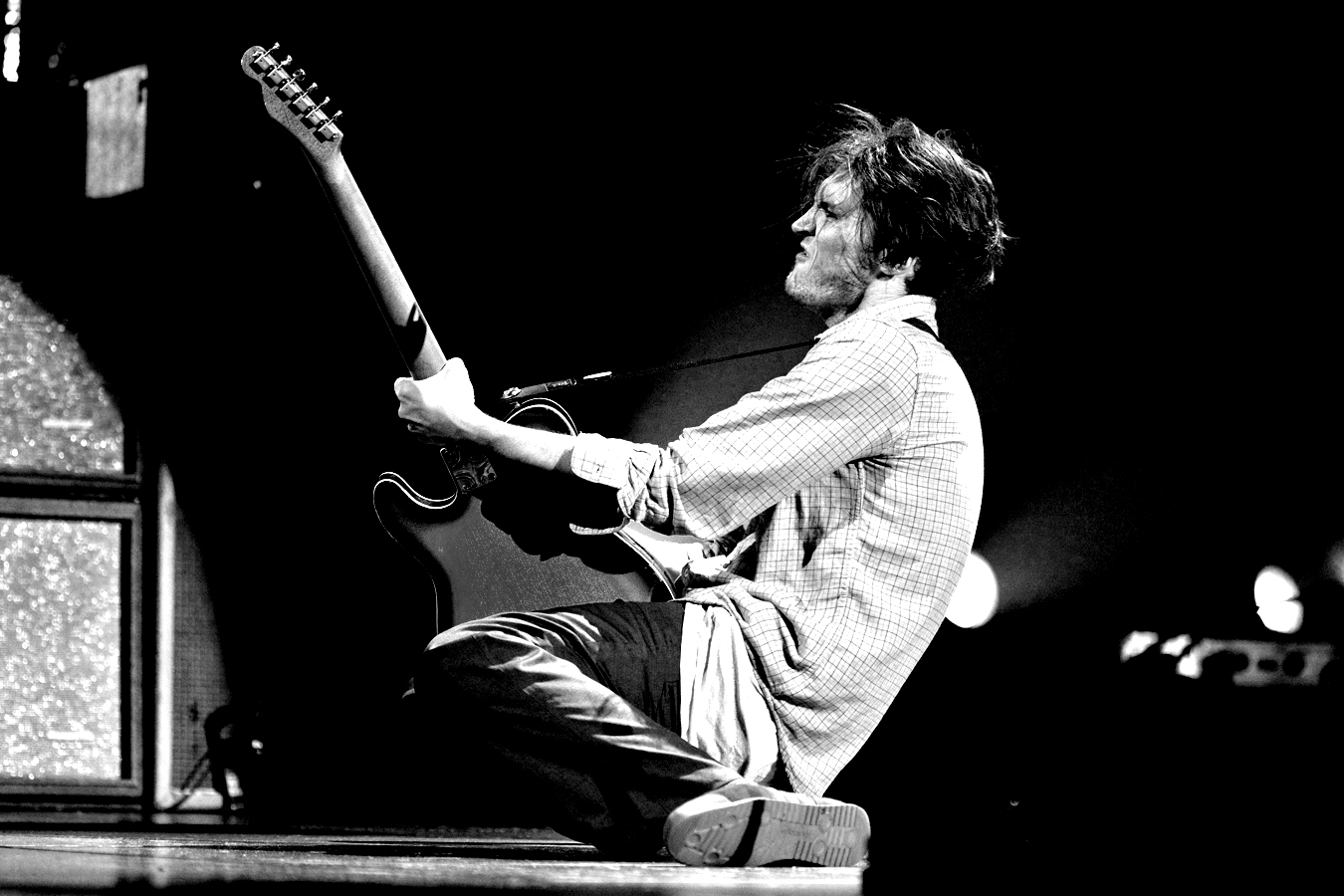
Org Music has released albums by Josh Klinghoffer (Red Hot Chili Peppers / Pearl Jam) projects Dot Hacker and Pluralone.

In 2011 Org Music also began partnering with Minutemen / fIREHOSE / The Stooges bassist Mike Watt and his clenchedwrench imprint. Org released Watt's solo album hyphenated-man—described as "the third installment of his punk opera" and the first release on clenchedwrench—as a clenchedwrench / Org Music release in March 2011. This was followed in July by dos y dos, the fourth album by the two-bass duo Dos featuring Watt and ex-Black flag bassist Kira Roessler. Subsequent Org Music releases included Watt projects such as Spielgusher, with Japanese musicians Hirotaka Shimizu and Yuko Araki and spoken word by music critic Richard Meltzer; numerous releases by Il Sogno del Marinaio with Italian musicians Stefano Pilia, Andrea Belfi and later Paolo Mongardi; EPs and split singles credited to Mike Watt and The Missingmen, Mike Watt and the Secondmen and Mike Watt and The Bobblymen; albums by SST Records alumni group Unknown Instructors and supergroup FITTED (the latter featuring members of post-punk band Wire); Stooges-themed singles recorded with fellow Stooges alumnus Larry Mullins (aka Toby Dammit); and a fifteen-part opera by the duo Pelicanman featuring violinist Petra Haden (that dog. / The Rentals). Org Music has also reissued Watt's 1990s solo albums Ball-Hog or Tugboat? and Contemplating the Engine Room on 180-gram vinyl.

In May 2012, Org Music released the album Inhibition by Dot Hacker, an experimental rock band fronted by guitarist Josh Klinghoffer. The album was initially completed in October 2009, the same month that Klinghoffer joined Red Hot Chili Peppers. Org went on to issue Dot Hacker's subsequent studio releases How's Your Process? (Work) (2014), How's Your Process? (Play) (2014) and Nº3 (2017). Org Music has also released Klinghoffer's solo albums under the Pluralone moniker—To Be One with You (2019), I Don't Feel Well (2020) and This Is the Show (2022). Kilnghoffer's single releases on Org Music include 2019's "Jeepster" b/w "Monolith," two T. Rex covers recorded with Red Hot Chili Peppers drummer Chad Smith, and Pluralball, a Pluralone release featuring covers of songs from the Merkin Ball single by Pearl Jam (whom Klinghoffer works with as touring and session musician).

In 2016, Org Music released two singles by cult rock and roll/psychedelic rock/avant-roots artist Tav Falco and his long-running band Tav Falco Panther Burns. Both singles, "Me & My Chauffeur Blues" b/w "Whistle Blower Blues" and "Sway" b/w "Where the Rio de Rosa Flows," feature Mike Watt and Larry Mullins (Toby Dammit) as band members. The label has since released Falco-fronted projects that include the studio albums A Tav Falco Christmas (2017) and Cabaret of Daggers (2018), the Club Car Zodiac EP (2021), the live-in-the-studio band set Nashville Sessions: Live at Bridgestone Arena Studios (2023), and the guest-heavy solo album Desire on Ice (2025).

On Record Store Day 2019, Org Music reissued Mindfulness by free jazz and avant-garde jazz drummer William Hooker, marking the album's first release on vinyl. Originally issued in 1997, the album features Glenn Spearman on tenor saxophone and DJ Olive on turntables. The double-LP reissue included two previously unreleased bonus tracks and was pressed on clear vinyl in a limited run of 800 copies. The label followed this with Symphonie of Flowers (also 2019), Big Moon (2021), Flesh and Bones (2023) and Jubilation (2025), as well as a 2023 Record Store Day double-LP reissue of Shamballa (1993), which features Hooker with Thurston Moore and Elliott Sharp. Hooker has been called "one of the most absorbing drummers on the planet" and "one of the few artists with a jazz sensibility to captivate the alternative-rock audience."

==== Band catalogue partnerships ====
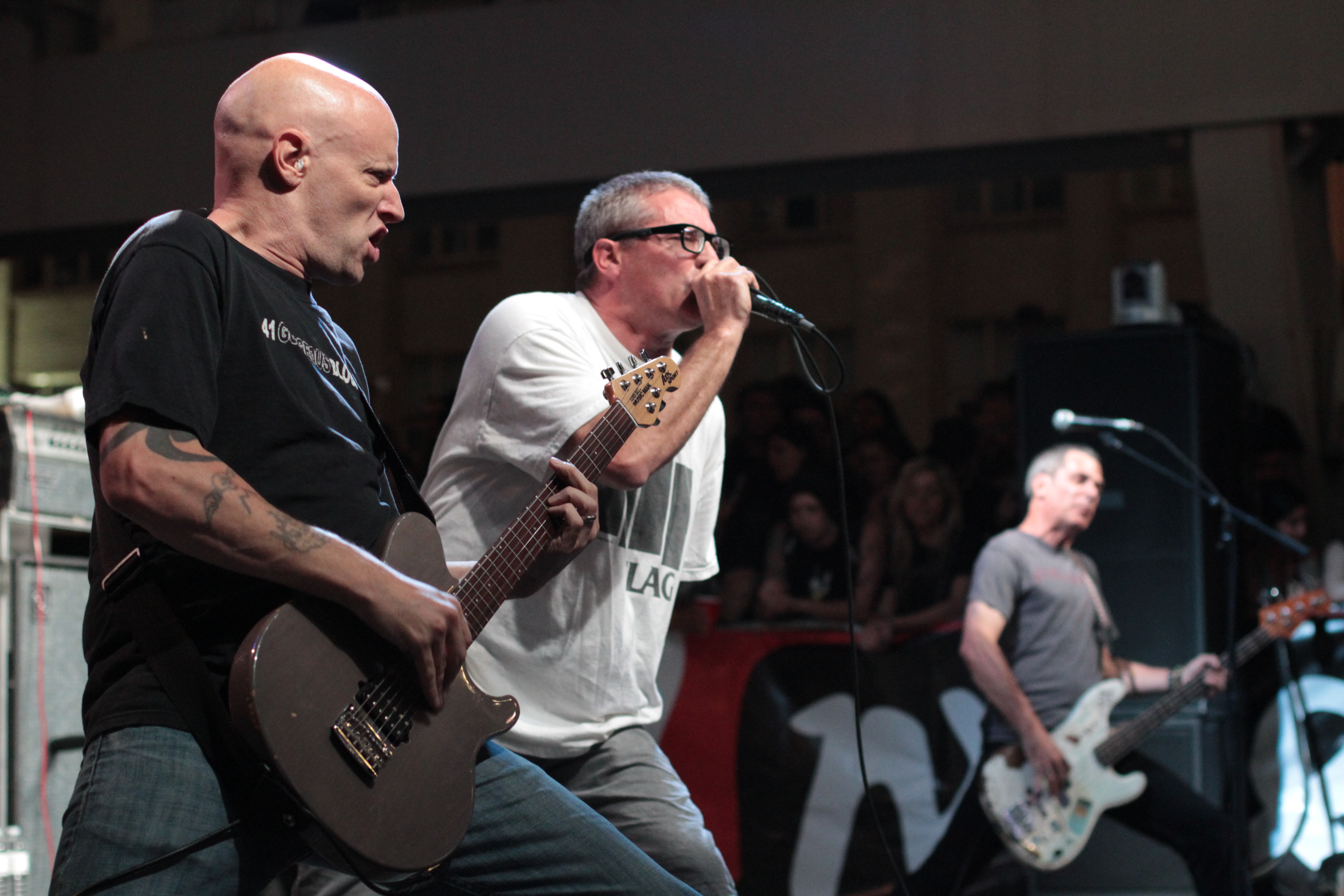
Punk rock bands Bad Brains and Descendents (pictured here) have licensed their back catalogues to Org Music. Both reissue series include alternate "Punk Note" album covers created to resemble classic jazz LPs.

In 2020, Org Music announced a partnership with the hardcore punk band Bad Brains to reissue the band's catalogue under the Bad Brains Records imprint, with remastering by engineer Dave Gardner. Org Music and Gardner spent more than a year locating the best available audio sources for each title, including master tapes believed to have been lost. Full-length studio albums in the series were also released in "Punk Note" editions with alternate covers designed to resemble Blue Note Records jazz LPs. In addition, a sixteen-page, newsprint-style fanzine—featuring previously unseen band photos and articles from contemporaries such as Henry Rollins and Jesse Malin—was offered as a free-with-purchase gift at select independent record stores. Releases in the series began in 2021 with the "Pay to Cum!" b/w "Stay Close to Me" 7-inch single, Bad Brains, the I and I Survive EP, and the original mix of Rock for Light. Later releases included The Youth Are Getting Restless and The Omega Sessions EP (2023), followed by I Against I (2024).

In 2025, Org Music and pop-punk progenitors Descendents launched a reissue campaign of the band's discography in multiple editions and formats, including "Punk Note" editions with alternate Blue Note–style album art as featured in the Bad Brains reissue series. Initial reissues released that year included Milo Goes to College and I Don't Want to Grow Up.

==== Aquarium Drunkard partnership ====
On Record Store Day 2020, Org Music released Lagniappe Sessions, Vol. 2 in conjunction with the music blog Aquarium Drunkard, which was founded by Justin Gage in 2005. The Lagniappe Sessions LPs compile tracks from Aquarium Drunkard's Lagniappe Sessions recording series, launched by Gage in 2011. Featured on its weekly SiriusXMU radio show, the Lagniappe series features artists recording cover versions of songs by musicians who have influenced them or whose work they admire. The resulting tracks are made available on the Aquarium Drunkard site as MP3s. Aquarium Drunkard released a previous installment, Lagniappe Sessions, Vol. 1, in conjunction with Light in the Attic Records in 2016.

Also in 2020, for Record Store Day Black Friday, Aquarium Drunkard and Org Music released the compilation Jesus People Music, Vol. 1: The End Is at Hand, which collected obscure and private-press Jesus music recordings from the 1960s–1970s psychedelic rock era.

Org Music and Aquarium Drunkard released three album co-productions in 2022. One, Atenção!: Novos Sons do Brasil, highlights a loose scene of contemporary singer-songwriters from Brazil. The other two were debut albums by contemporary Los Angeles–based acts Sagittaire and Color Green. 2023 co-productions included a new album by Austin-based musician Cactus Lee, as well as the compilations Jesus People Music, Vol. 2: The Reckoning and Sonhos Secretos: Brazilian Private Press & Independent Productions on 7" 1980–1985.

=== Label custodianship ===
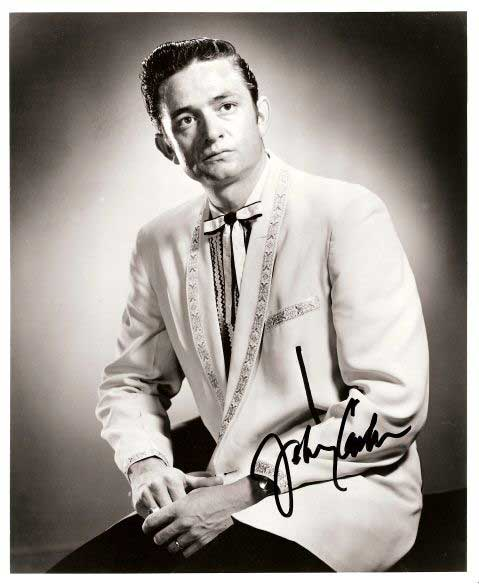
Org Music's first collaboration with Sun Records included a reissue of Johnny Cash with His Hot and Blue Guitar!, the debut LP by Johnny Cash (pictured here in 1955).

One facet of Org Music's work involves relaunching largely inactive record labels and reintroducing their catalogues to the marketplace, highlighting overlooked titles along the way.

In 2012, Org Music began a reissue series with the British jazz imprint Black Lion Records, reintroducing the label's long out-of-print catalogue on vinyl. Label partner Eric Astor brought the Black Lion catalogue to Org Music's attention, as DA Music, a connection of his based in Germany, owned the catalogue. The first two releases in Org Music's "Black Lion Essential Reissue Series" were Thelonious Monk's The London Collection, Volume 1, a 1971 solo piano session recorded at Chappell Studios in London, and Miles Davis's Bopping the Blues, a 1946 studio session recorded at Radio Recorders in Hollywood that has been described as "the very first known instance of the famed trumpeter playing in an 'open' style." Both albums were issued in 45 rpm double-LP and 33 rpm single-LP editions. Stereophile magazine used the two-disc 45 rpm Monk release in 2015 to evaluate a Sperling Audio L-1 high-end turntable, reporting that it produced "a three-dimensional image of a piano floating in space: Monk in my room, playing for me." Further releases in the series included Duke Ellington's The Feeling of Jazz (2012), drawn from a set of 1962 sessions recorded for Ellington's private "stockpile" at Bell Sound Studios in New York; Billie Holiday's At Storyville (2014), compiled from early-1950s performances at the Storyville nightclub in Boston; and Dexter Gordon titles such as Both Sides of Midnight (2016) and Take the 'A' Train (2017), both sourced from 1967 live recordings at Jazzhus Montmartre in Copenhagen.

In 2014, Sun Records announced a partnership with Org Music for the release of two Record Store Day titles: a remastered blue vinyl edition of Johnny Cash with His Hot and Blue Guitar! and the compilation Sun Records – Curated by Record Store Day, Volume 1. The latter featured "tracks hand selected by independent record stores." Org Music and Sun would become frequent collaborators in the ensuing years, with the label releasing titles from Sun artists Jerry Lee Lewis, Carl Perkins, Howlin' Wolf and Charlie Feathers. Some of Org Music's reissues from lesser-known Sun acts became critical favorites, with blues musician Doctor Ross' compilation Memphis Breakdown (2018) receiving an "A–" rating from The Vinyl District, soul singer Johnny Adams' compilation Heart & Soul (1969, reissued in 2017) also earning an "A–" from The Daily Vault, and doo-wop and soul vocal group The Ad Libs' compilation Presenting...The Ad Libs (2018) appearing on critics' year-end best-of lists.

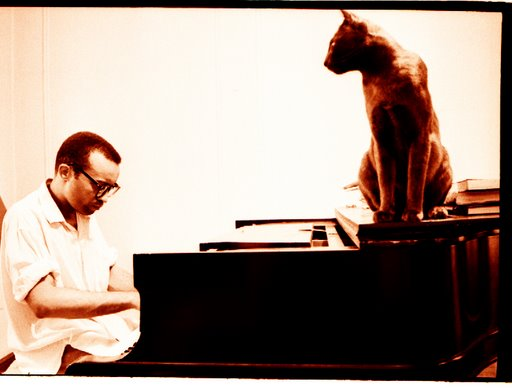
Free jazz pianist Cecil Taylor in the 1960s. Org Music's Freedom Records line includes reissues from Taylor, Albert Ayler & Don Cherry, and the Art Ensemble of Chicago.

Org Music released the free jazz album Vibrations by Albert Ayler and Don Cherry on limited-edition colored vinyl for Record Store Day Black Friday 2017. Originally issued on Freedom Records, an imprint of the Black Lion label, the title quickly sold out. Fan demand led the label to reissue Vibrations on standard black vinyl, along with the free and avant-garde jazz titles Silent Tongues by Cecil Taylor and Tutankhamun by the Art Ensemble of Chicago. The pressing of Silent Tongues was praised by Parttime Audiophile as a "quiet, magnificent pressing" and was later included in The Absolute Sound magazine's 50th-anniversary edition of its "Super LP List." Tutankhamun had not previously been available on its own on LP in the US, and the Org Music edition added two bonus tracks that had not been included on the original vinyl release. Further LPs in the Freedom line included Cecil Taylor's The Great Paris Concert and the Art Ensemble of Chicago's The Spiritual, both of which The Vinyl District rated "A" and designated as "reissue/archival picks."

On December 15, 2017, Org Music released two LPs licensed from the George H. Buck Jr. (GHB) Jazz Foundation: Louis Armstrong's Jazz Is Back in Grand Rapids and Duke Ellington's Volume 1: 1943. The GHB Jazz Foundation is home to the Jazzology, Audiophile, Progressive, Circle and Paramount labels, as well as the World Broadcasting System transcription library. The Vinyl District rated both LPs "A–", and they were included in Jack Rabid's "2018's 50 Best Releases of Old Recordings and Reissues" year-end list in The Big Takeover. GHB officially announced the licensing deal with Org Music the following year (2018), noting that the label had produced "beautifully designed LPs" from Ellington and Armstrong, as well as from Bunk Johnson, Sister Rosetta Tharpe, Les Paul, and Shirley Horn. Goldmine magazine later included Ernest Tubb's The World Broadcast Recordings 1944–1945 in its "17 Top Picks from Record Store Day 2024" list. That album, along with Charley Patton's Father Of The Delta Blues: Selections From Paramount Recordings, appeared in Rabid's "2024's 150 Best Releases of Old Recordings & Reissues" year-end list in The Big Takeover.

On Record Store Day 2019, Org Music released two LP's of material from Los Angeles-based independent label Delicious Vinyl. The reissue of The Loneliest Punk (2005), the debut LP by Fatlip of the hip-hop group The Pharcyde, received an "A–" rating from The Vinyl District. Its counterpart, the compilation A Slice of Delicious Vinyl: Rare Singles and RMXS, featured "rare singles, remixes, and B-sides" from the Delicious Vinyl vaults. For Record Store Day 2024, Org Music released Love, LA, a compilation featuring "pairings of artists who possess a close relationship with Los Angeles, performing duets of their favourite songs." The album was co-produced by Rick Ross of Delicious Vinyl and features contributions from artists such as Robyn Hitchcock and Marc Maron. Goldmine included the album in its "17 top picks from RSD 2024" feature, and the LP received positive reviews from magazines such as Under the Radar and Spill. Record Store Day Black Friday 2025 saw the vinyl debut of Amusing the Amazing (1997), an EP by Slo Burn, a stoner rock band fronted by former Kyuss vocalist John Garcia. Amusing the Amazing was initially released by "Malicious Vinyl," Delicious Vinyl's rock imprint.

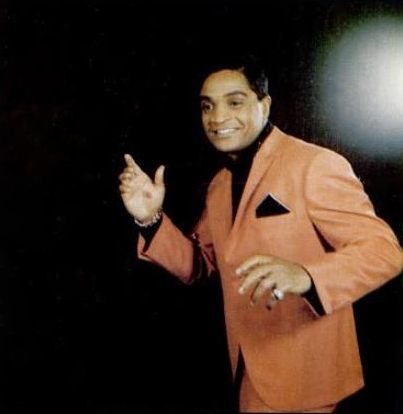
Org Music's reissues from the Brunswick Records catalog include albums by Jackie Wilson (pictured here) and The Chi-Lites.

In 2020, Org Music began partnering with Brunswick Records, releasing soul group The Chi-Lites' (For God's Sake) Give More Power to the People (1971) as a Barnes & Noble exclusive, along with a holiday release of Jackie Wilson's Merry Christmas From Jackie Wilson (1963). (For God's Sake) Give More Power to the People was listed at number 15 in Jack Rabid's "2020's 100 Best Releases of Old Recordings & Reissues" year-end list in The Big Takeover, and received a wider release in 2021. 2023 Org Music/Brunswick releases included Willie Henderson and the Soul Explosion's Funky Chicken (1970), The Chi-Lites' A Lonely Man (1972), Jackie Wilson's Higher and Higher (1967) and The Lost Generation's Young, Tough and Terrible (1972). The latter LP was featured in Paste magazine's "New & Notable Vinyl Releases (July 2023)" feature, and all four albums were listed in Goldmine magazine's "Top 20 Classic Soul Reissues for 2023" feature. On Record Store Day 2025, Org Music released Try Some of Mine: The Brunswick Recordings by Little Richard, a limited edition, pink lemonade-colored 12-inch EP that collects the rock and roll singer's three Brunswick 7-inch singles, along with an alternate version of "Baby Don't You Tear My Clothes."

In 2023, Org Music began working with Detroit-based soul and funk label Westbound Records on a reissue series built around the restoration of the label's original master tapes. The partnership was framed as a relaunch of the Westbound catalog, with the series beginning 6 October 2023 with a multi-format reissue of Pleasure (1973) by Ohio Players. Followup releases included reissues of The Counts' What's Up Front That Counts (1971) and Eramus Hall's Your Love is My Desire (1980), as well as The Westbound Sound: Westbound Records Curated by RSD, Vol. 1, a 2024 Record Store Day exclusive. The Org Music/Westbound reissue of What’s Up Front That Counts drew particular notice, with Goldmine naming it among its "Top 20 Classic Soul Reissues for 2023" and Paste spotlighting the album in its "Record Time: New and Notable Vinyl Releases (RSD Black Friday Edition)" feature. Further 2024 releases included Album (1971) by Detroit-based rock band Assemblage, Finger Pickin Good (1975) by guitarist Dennis Coffey, and Lost and Found by Eramus Hall. Lost and Found was Org Music's first release of archival material from the Westbound archives and was singled out in lists of notable Record Store Day Black Friday 2024 titles by Variety and HHV Mag. 2025 releases included Trapped by a Thing Called Love (1972) by soul singer Denise LaSalle and the 29 August remastered release of Funkadelic's self-titled debut LP.

== Record Store Day involvement ==
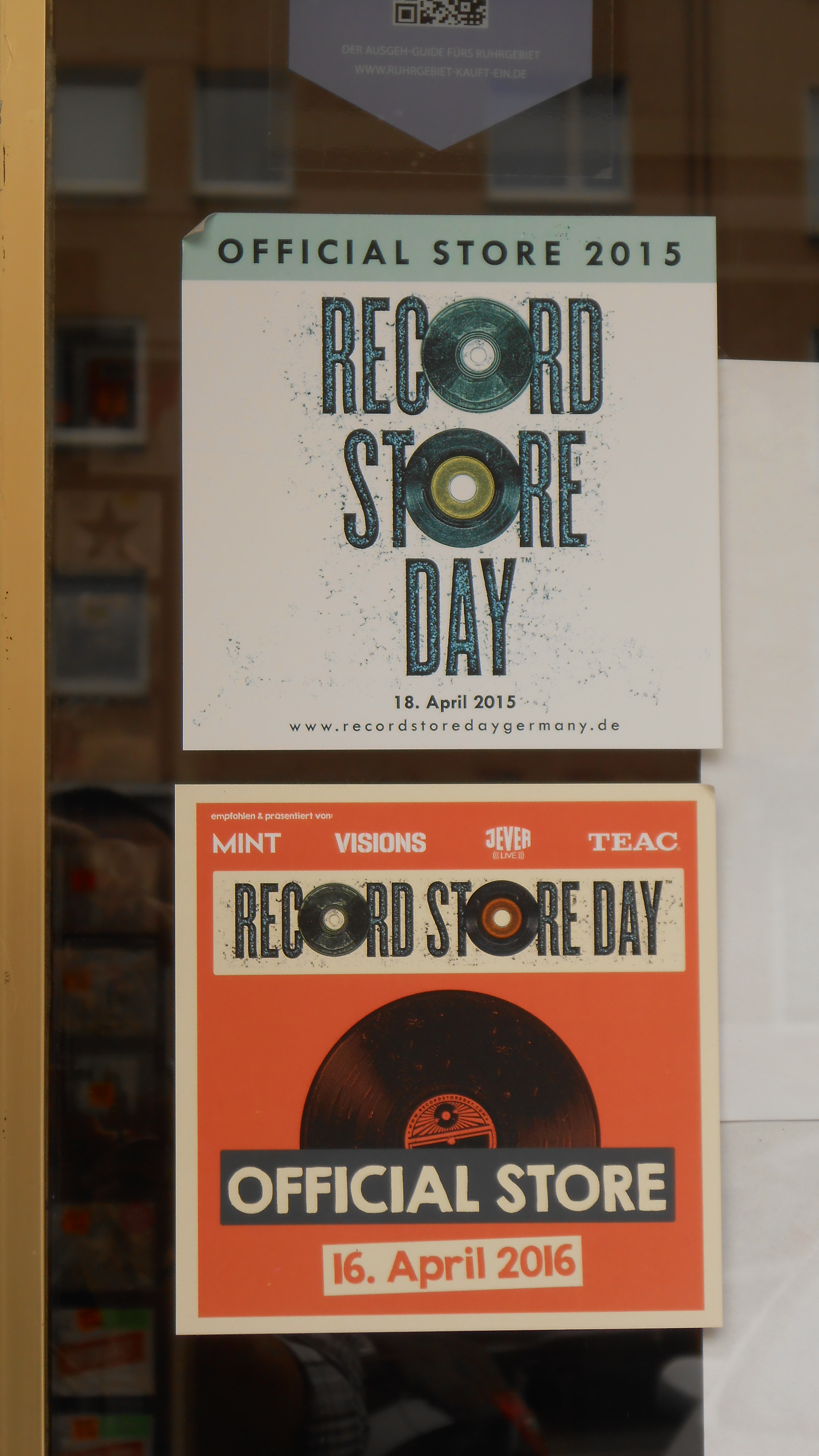
Signage for a record store participating in Record Store Day. Org Music has released over 100 titles in conjunction with Record Store Day as of November 2022.

Org Music's involvement with Record Store Day traces back to 2007, when one of the label's founding members worked with Record Store Day co-founder Michael Kurtz to involve Warner Music Group in supplying releases for Record Store Day events on the vinyl LP format while said founding member was working at the label. In November 2022, Org Music general manager and co-owner Andrew Rossiter estimated that the label had released over a hundred releases specifically for Record Store Day and Record Store Day Black Friday. In Larry Jaffee's book Record Store Day: The Most Improbable Comeback of the 21st Century, Rossiter describes Record Store Day as having played "a critical role in [Org Music's] growth and success."

Org Music collaborated with Record Store Day on the annual Sun Records Curated By Record Store Day series, which began with a limited-run Volume 1 release announced by Sun Records in 2014. According to Long Live Vinyl, each compilation in the series featured "deep cuts" from the Sun Records catalog. "Store owners vote for the tracks, the RSD organisation helps with the concept artwork, and as a community, they launch the finished record together." The series reached its tenth installment in 2023 with A Decade in Love: Sun Records Curated by Record Store Day – Volume 10.

The Org Music Curated by Record Store Day series shifted from Sun Records to Westbound Records with The Westbound Sound: Westbound Records Curated by Record Store Day, Vol. 1, released for Record Store Day 2024. It was followed in 2025 by The Westbound Sound: Foundations, a compilation emphasizing Westbound tracks that were later sampled in hip-hop music.

In 2018, the Record Store Day organization worked with its long-time turntable partner Crosley to revive the 3-inch, 45 rpm vinyl format, which was originally developed in Japan in the 1960s. The revived 3-inch turntable, marketed as the Crosley RSD3, debuted for Record Store Day 2019. For Record Store Day Black Friday later that year, Org Music released a set of four Sun Records 3-inch singles to mark the 50th anniversary of the label's 1969 move from Memphis to Nashville. The set featured titles by Johnny Cash, Jerry Lee Lewis, Carl Perkins, and Roy Orbison. For Record Store Day Black Friday 2020, Org Music issued a second set of Sun Records 3-inch singles, this time all by Johnny Cash.

Comedian Fred Armisen served as Record Store Day Ambassador in 2021. Armisen presided over a dual-release date model branded as "RSD Drops," which the organization adopted as a temporary measure due to the COVID-19 pandemic. The two release dates took place on June 12 and July 17 of that year. On the latter date, Org Music released Armisen's EP Parade Meeting, a one-sided record featuring three instrumental tracks produced and recorded by Ty Segall, with Armisen on drums. The EP pressing was limited to 1000 copies.

== Distribution ==
In July 2025, Secretly Distribution, the Bloomington, Indiana–based distribution arm of Secretly Group, announced a worldwide distribution deal with Org Music.

In September 2019, Org Music switched its distribution away from Warner's Alternative Distribution Alliance (ADA) amid concerns related to disruptions involving Direct Shot Distribution, which served as a warehousing and fulfillment provider for parts of the independent distribution sector. In October 2020, Billboard magazine reported that AMPED Distribution, the independent distribution division of Alliance Entertainment, had signed Org Music "in the past year."

== Artists (reissues and new releases) ==
- 10,000 Maniacs
- 400 Blows
- Adam Green
- Adam Green & Binki Shapiro
- Albert Ayler
- Albert Ayler & Don Cherry
- Alcoholic Faith Mission
- Andrew Bird's Bowl of Fire
- Antônio Carlos Jobim
- Anywhere
- Archie Shepp
- Art Ensemble of Chicago
- Art Farmer & Jim Hall
- Assemblage
- Augustus Pablo
- Aztlan Unearthed
- Baby Dodds Trio
- Bad Brains
- Ben Folds
- Ben Folds Five
- Ben Webster
- Bernie Worrell
- Beverly Glenn-Copeland
- Big Bill Broonzy
- Bill Justis
- Billie Holiday
- Blue Glass
- Boobie Knight and The Universal Lady
- Boogarins
- Bud Powell
- Bunk Johnson
- Cactus Lee
- Capgun Coup
- Carducci Bros
- Carl Perkins
- Carole King
- Caveman
- Cecil Taylor
- Chad Smith & Josh Klinghoffer
- Charles Mingus
- Charley Patton
- Charlie Feathers
- Chet Baker
- Choice Words
- Color Green
- Daniel Johnston
- Darkest Hour
- Dave Brubeck
- David Grisman
- David Hillyard and The Rocksteady 7
- Del Casher
- Denise LaSalle
- Dennis Coffey
- Descendents
- Detective
- Dexter Gordon
- Doctor Ross
- Dos
- Dot Hacker
- Dream Sitch
- Duke Ellington
- Earl Hines
- Eleven
- Eramus Hall
- Eric Slick
- Ernest Tubb
- E V Kain
- Failure
- FATLIP
- fIREHOSE
- FITTED
- Flea
- Fool's Gold
- Frank Frost With The Night Hawks
- Fred Armisen
- Fred McDowell
- Freddie Hubbard
- Funkadelic
- Gareth Sager Quartet
- Geckøs
- Grateful Dead
- Guaxe
- Hank Jones
- Hawkwind
- Helmet
- Hifiklub
- Howlin' Wolf
- Il Sogno del Marinaio
- Infectious Grooves
- Inner Wave
- Insects vs Robots
- J. Marinelli
- Jack Irons
- Jackie Wilson
- James Blood Ulmer
- Jeannie C. Riley
- Jeremy and The Harlequins
- Jerry Garcia & David Grisman
- Jerry Lee Lewis
- Jim Hall
- Jimmy Eat World
- Jimmy Giuffre 3
- Jimmy Sweeney
- John Coltrane
- John Salvage
- Johnny Adams
- Johnny Bragg
- Johnny Cash
- Johnny Griffin
- Johnny O'Donnell
- John Salvage
- Jowe Head
- Kath Bloom
- King Gizzard and The Lizard Wizard
- Larry Mullins & Mike Watt
- Les Paul
- Lewis Pesacov
- Linda Martell
- Little Richard
- Los Hijos Del Rey
- Louis Armstrong
- Luke Top
- M34N STR33T
- Mario Monterosso
- Marion Brown
- Mastodonna
- Mia Doi Todd
- Michael Nau
- Mike Martt
- Mike Watt
- Mike Watt and the Black Gang
- Mike Watt and the Bobblymen
- Mike Watt and the Missingmen
- Mike Watt and the Secondmen
- Miles Davis
- Milk Jennings
- Milt Hinton
- Milt Jackson
- Nat Turner Rebellion
- Nirvana
- Ocampo, Ocampo + Watt
- Ohio Players
- Oozelles
- Ornette Coleman
- Ottto
- Overwhelming Colorfast
- Pale Saints
- Particle Kid
- Particle Kid & John Doe (as "Kid Doe")
- Pastilla
- Paul Desmond
- Paul Desmond & Gerry Mulligan
- Peggy Lee
- Pelicanman
- Phil Ranelin
- Pluralone
- Porno For Pyros
- Psing Psong Psung
- Qui
- Ray Charles & Milt Jackson
- Refused
- Redd Kross
- Richard Hell and The Voidoids
- Richard Lloyd
- Roland Hanna
- Roy Orbison
- Sagittaire
- Sahib Shihab
- Samuel S.C.
- Sandra Boynton
- Shirley Horn
- Sister Rosetta Tharpe
- Skip James
- Slo Burn
- Sly and the Family Stone
- Sock-Tight
- Sonic Youth
- Sonny Rollins
- Spielgusher
- Sugar Candy Mountain
- Sugar Glyder
- Suicidal Tendencies
- Sun Ra
- Sunny War
- Taper's Choice
- Tav Falco
- Tav Falco Panther Burns
- Tchotchke
- Teenage Fanclub
- Terry Riley & Gyan Riley
- The Ad Libs
- The Afghan Whigs
- The Big Ol' Nasty Getdown
- The Buzzcocks
- The Chi-Lites
- The Chuck Dukowski Sextet
- The Counts
- The Germs
- The Happy Dragon Band
- The Lost Generation
- The Moldy Peaches
- The Offspring
- The Replacements
- The Sheila Divine
- The Toothaches
- The Vitals
- The Viscaynes
- The Way Down Wanderers
- Thelonious Monk
- There Is No Mountain
- This Mortal Coil
- Together Pangea
- Tom Petty and The Heartbreakers
- Tone Scientists
- T.S.O.L.
- Unknown Instructors
- Velvert Turner Group
- Vic Ruggiero
- Vopli Vidopliassova
- Weather Report
- Wendell Harrison
- Westbound Train
- William Hooker
- Willie Henderson and The Soul Explosions
- Winter
- Winter & Triptides
- Würm
- Wynton Marsalis
- Yellow Red Sparks
- Zachary Cale

== See also ==
- Record Store Day
- Lists of record labels
