= Tav Falco =

- Born: Philadelphia, Pennsylvania, US
- Genres: Rock and roll; psychedelic rock; rockabilly; cabaret; jazz
- Occupations: Musician; performance artist; filmmaker; actor; author; photographer; dancer
- Years active: 1973–present
- Labels: Frenzi; Org Music; Stag-O-Lee; Blang!; Rough Trade Records; Sympathy for the Record Industry; New Rose; Intercord/EMI; Animal; Helter Skelter
- Member of: Tav Falco's Panther Burns
- Website: Tav Falco Official Website

Gustavo Antonio "Tav" Falco is an American-born filmmaker, actor, musician, author, photographer, and dancer. Falco has fronted the experimental band Tav Falco's Panther Burns since 1979, and founded a parallel solo career that incorporates other styles such as cabaret, tango, and vocal jazz. He has directed one feature film and numerous short films, and has played minor acting roles in motion pictures filmed in both North America and Europe. He is the author of two books, one a psychography of the city of Memphis, and the other a collection of his photography.

== Biography ==
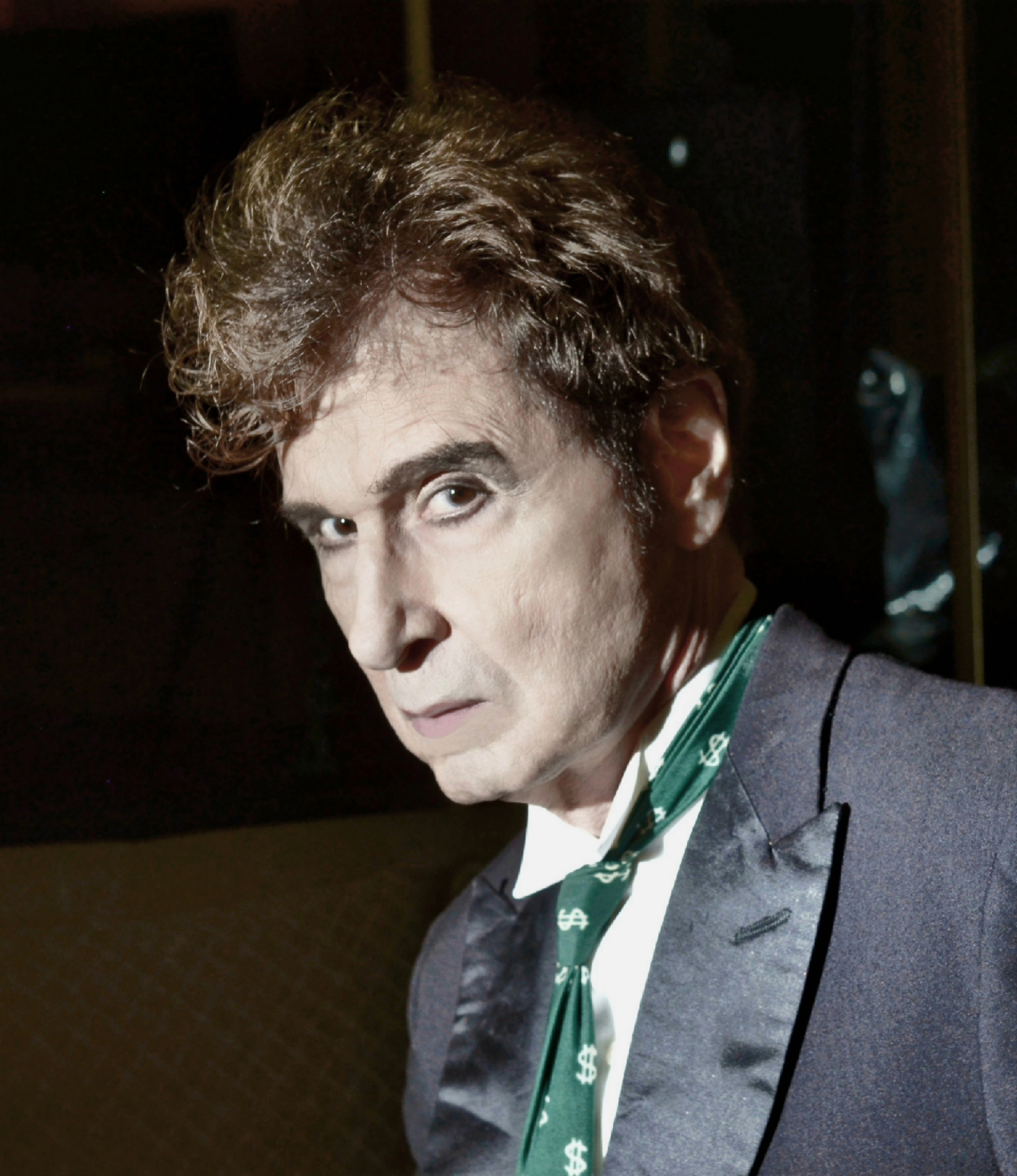
Tav Falco 2025

Falco was born in Philadelphia, Pennsylvania to a family of Italian descent but grew up in rural southwest Arkansas between Whelen Springs and Gurdon. After studying theater and film at the University of Arkansas in Fayetteville, Falco moved to Memphis in 1973. In the mid-1970s, he started the nonprofit Televista "art-action" video group with fellow Arkansas poet/performance artist/videographer Randall Lyon to create art and to document local musicians and artists. While with Televista, Falco worked with and trained in photography and filmmaking under Memphis color photographer William Eggleston.

In 1978, Alex Chilton teamed up with Falco after being impressed by Falco's performance of the song "Bourgeois Blues" at The Orpheum Theatre in Memphis, which culminated in the chainsawing of an electric guitar. The two founded the self-styled "art damage" rock and roll band Tav Falco's Panther Burns in 1979. The group was named after lore surrounding a plantation in Mississippi. The Panther Burns' debut album, Behind The Magnolia Curtain, was recorded at Ardent Studios in Memphis and released by Rough Trade Records. A December 3, 1980, session recorded at Sam Phillips Recording Service was released in 1992 on Marilyn Records as The Unreleased Sessions. Falco moved to New York in 1981, and released his official follow-up album, Blow Your Top, on Chris Stein's Animal Records imprint, which was distributed by Chrysalis Records.

Tav Falco's Panther Burns celebrated its 40th anniversary in 2019 with a tour dubbed the "40th Anniversary Howl", with its prime show taking place May 21 of that year in Memphis at Lafayette's Music Room.

Falco devoted portions of his musical career to highlighting traditional regional artists from Memphis and Mississippi who had not gained media attention. He filmed a black & white short film of blues artist R.L. Burnside performing at Brotherhood Sportsmen's Lodge in Como, Mississippi, on September 28, 1974. After assembling The Panther Burns, Falco performed and collaborated with legacy rockabilly and blues performers such as Charlie Feathers, James Luther Dickinson, and Cordell Jackson. His photography was used for the Charlie Feathers album Honky Tonk Man (New Rose Records, 1988).

Falco would also promote and work with lesser-known regional contemporaries. His record imprint, Frenzi Records, released a 1986 compilation of area artists entitled Swamp Surfing in Memphis, as well as a 1988 studio EP by female-led group The Hellcats. These records received respective international distribution from Au Go Go Records (Australia) and New Rose Records (France).

In 2014, Falco compiled a double album of some of his favorite tracks from his music collection, Tav Falco's Wild & Exotic World of Musical Obscurities, which was released on Stag-O-Lee Records. The album set included a cover song by The Panther Burns and liner notes by Falco.

In the 1990s, Falco relocated from the United States to Paris, and then to Vienna, where he lived for nearly two decades. In January 2022, he located to Bangkok, where he currently resides. Often Falco has claimed his main artistic purpose is "to stir up the dark waters of the unconscious."

In a 2019 interview, Falco described himself as a "Utopian anarchist".

=== Work in films ===
==== As filmmaker ====
Starting in the 1970s, Falco created a number of short films on varying topics focusing on "underground" art-actions and cultural assets around the mid-American South. The Cinémathèque Française in Paris accepted and archived six of Falco's short films into its permanent collection. Among the titles archived are Masque of Hôtel Orient, Born Too Late, Helene of Memphis, Memphis Beat, Shadetree Mechanic, and 71 Salvage. A selection of Falco's short films were shown in a retrospective at the Cinémathèque Française in 2006, with Falco himself in attendance.

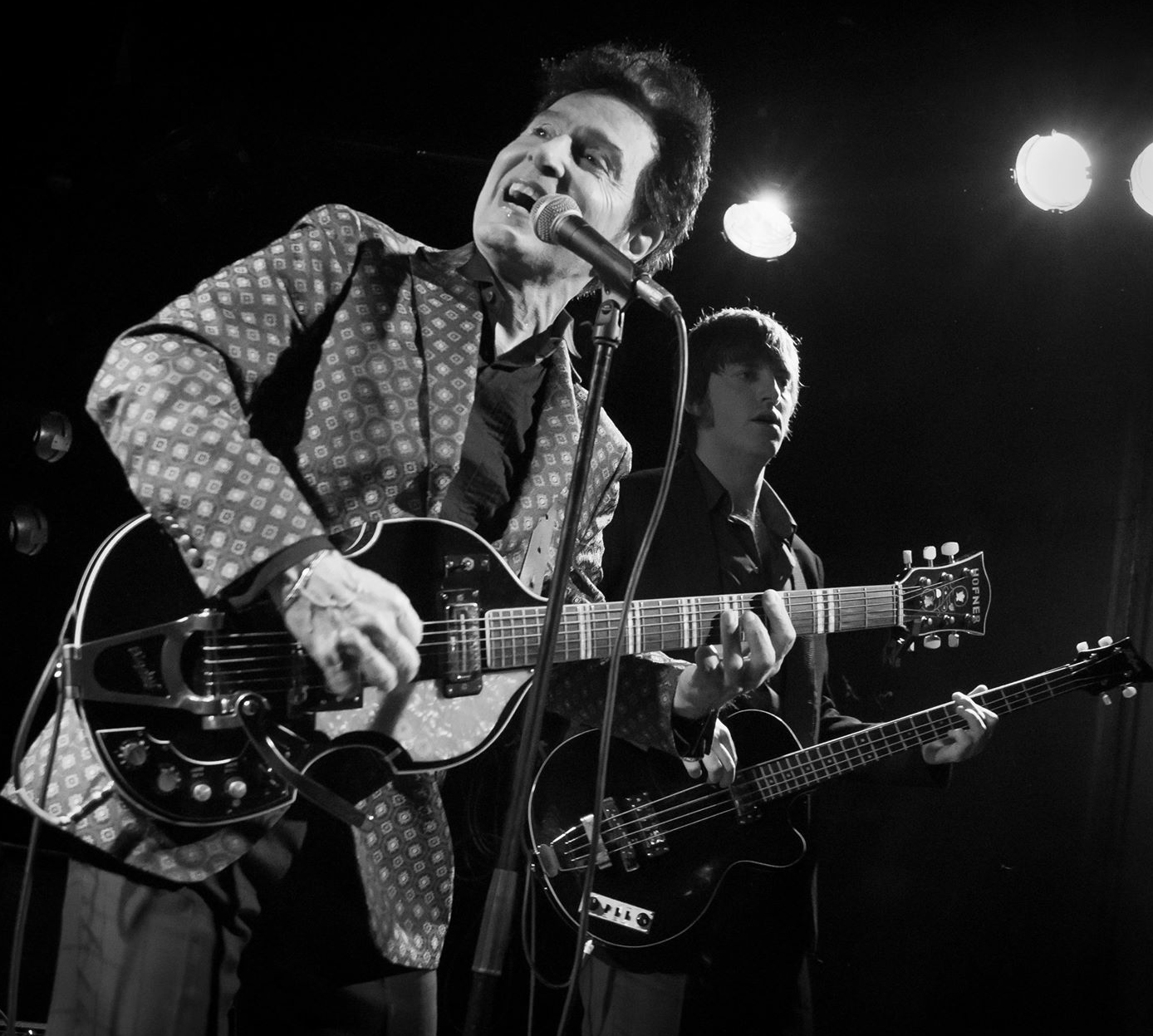
Falco with Tav Falco's Panther Burns member Giuseppe Sangirardi performing in Kuudes linja, Helsinki, Finland, 2019

Urania Descending, the first feature film directed by Falco, was completed in 2014 and released in 2016 by Lamplighter Films. The film consists of portions of what was intended to be a film trilogy. As of February 2024, Falco completed the full Urania Trilogy. Avant-premieres were held at key cinematheques in America and in Europe including a special event at Cinéma Saint-André des Arts in Paris presented by avant-garde cineaste, F.J. Ossang.

In addition to the Cinémathèque Française, Falco's film work has been screened at The Horse Hospital, London; the David Lynch-designed Silencio Cinema, Paris; Anthology Film Archives, New York; Roxie Theater, San Francisco; Oxford Film Festival, Mississippi; Austria Film Archiv Metrokino, Vienna; and by the American Cinematheque in the Steven Spielberg Cinema at the Egyptian Theatre in Hollywood.

==== As actor ====
Falco appeared as an actor with minor roles in the feature films Great Balls of Fire!, A nagy postarablás (The Great Post Office Robbery), Highway 61, Downtown 81, and Wayne County Rambling.

Downtown 81 was shot in New York in 1981 and was directed by Edo Bertoglio. The film starred artist Jean-Michel Basquiat and featured Debbie Harry, James Chance, Arto Lindsay, and August Darnell in supporting roles. Falco was featured in a cameo role shot on Super 16mm film, where he created and then recited improvised dialogue with Basquiat. Basquiat hated the dialogue so much he walked off the set. Initially abandoned, the film was released by Metrograph Pictures in 2000.

After taking an interest in tango dancing in the 1990s and devoting time to studying the dance in Buenos Aires, Falco appeared as a tanguero in the 2003 film Dans Le Rouge du Couchant.

=== As author ===
Falco has collaborated with Erik Morse, an American underground author, music writer and journalist, on a two-volume book series about the city of Memphis entitled Mondo Memphis. Falco's book, Ghosts Behind The Sun: Splendor, Enigma, and Death/Mondo Memphis: Volume 1, is a 450-page encyclopedic history and psychography of Memphis, beginning well before the Civil War and moving forward to more recent autobiographical accounts set in that city. Morse's Bluff City Underground/Mondo Memphis: Volume 2 roman noir follows a West Coast graduate student and his encounters with a Memphis secret society.

In 2015, Falco's book of photography, a collection of black & white images of the American South entitled Iconography of Chance: 99 Photographs of the Evanescent South, was published by Elsinore Press and distributed by University of Chicago Press.

=== As solo musician ===
After moving to Vienna, Falco took an interest in tango, cabaret, and similar continental musical styles. The 1995 Tav Falco & The Panther Burns album Shadow Dancer introduced these influences to his music. In 1996, he released two 10" LP releases, Disappearing Angels and 2 Sides of Tav Falco, under the "Tav Falco" name.

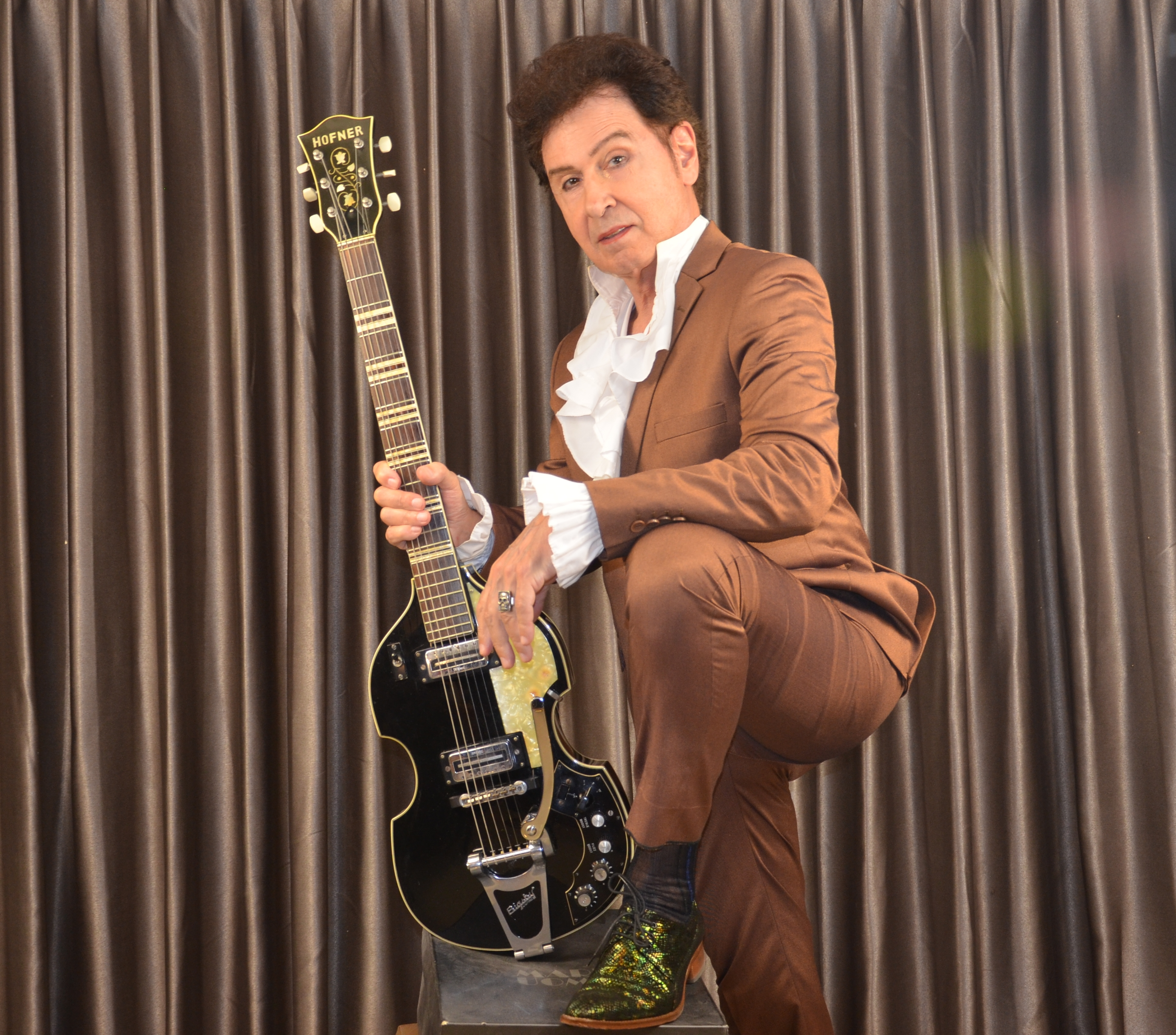
Falco in Bangkok, Thailand, July 2022

In 2016, Falco released the holiday-themed album A Tav Falco Christmas on the Los Angeles-based record label Org Music. Recorded at Sam Phillips Recording Service, the album featured Mike Watt on bass, and was produced by guitarist Mario Monterosso. The Los Angeles Times called it "gloriously demented enough to act as a tonic for anyone who can't bear the thought of another dose of sugary sentimentality."

In a 2018 interview with Adam J. Harmer of the British indie rock group Fat White Family, Falco stated, "I'm getting away from the rock and roll world to get a little peace of mind." In April of that year, Falco recorded the sessions that would become the album Cabaret of Daggers at Terminal 2 Studio in Rome, with Mario Monterosso producing once again. Two of the album's songs, including the anthemic "Red Vienna," are Falco originals. The remainder includes selections from the Great American Songbook such as "Strange Fruit" and "Born to Be Blue," and veers far enough away from The Panther Burns' signature sound that Falco opted to present it as a solo album, despite Panther Burns members being featured prominently on the album. Cabaret of Daggers was released by Org Music on limited edition yellow vinyl on Record Store Day on November 23, and on black vinyl and digital formats on November 30. Mojo magazine stated that the album "conjures up a potent mix of blues, jazz and tango rhythms in which 1920s Vienna café culture seamlessly rubs shoulders with Beale Street juke joints," and rated the album four stars out of five.

In 2024, Falco recorded the solo album Desire on Ice. The album featured reworked versions of original songs written by Falco, most of which were featured on previous albums. The album also featured a large roster of guest musicians, such as Jon Spencer (Jon Spencer Blues Explosion), The Reverend Horton Heat, Bobby Gillespie (Primal Scream / The Jesus and Mary Chain), and Ann Magnuson. Org Music released the album on 12 September 2025 to positive reviews, including a 5/5 rating from Mojo magazine with a special inset, an 8/10 rating from Uncut with a full page writeup, and another 8/10 rating from Classic Rock.

== Works ==
=== Filmography ===
Title	Film type	Role	Year	Country
71 Salvage	Short	Actor	1971	USA
Shadetree Mechanic	Short	Actor	1986	USA
Memphis Beat	Short	Director	1989	USA
Great Balls of Fire!	Feature	Actor	1989	USA
Highway 61	Feature	Actor	1991	Canada
Helene of Memphis	Short	Director	1991	USA
A nagy postarablás (The Great Post Office Robbery)	Feature	Actor	1992	Hungary
Born Too Late	Short	Actor	1993	France
Masque Of Hotel Orient	Short	Actor	1996	Austria
Downtown 81	Feature	Actor	2001	USA
Wayne County Rambling	Feature	Actor	2002	USA
Dans Le Rouge du Couchant	Feature	Actor	2003	France/Spain
Urania Descending	Feature	Director	2016	Austria/France
The Urania Trilogy	Feature	Director	2024	Austria/France/USA

=== Bibliography ===
Title	Year	Publisher	Notes
Ghosts Behind The Sun: Splendor, Enigma, and Death/Mondo Memphis: Volume 1	2011	Creation Books	Part of a two-part book collaboration with Erik Morse
Iconography of Chance: 99 Photographs of the Evanescent South	2015	Elsinore Press (Dist. by University of Chicago Press)	Photography book

=== Solo discography ===
Title	Type	Year	Label
Albums
Disappearing Angels	10" LP	1996	Frenzi / Sympathy for the Record Industry (USA)
2 Sides of Tav Falco (live)	10" LP	1996	Frenzi / Helter Skelter Records (Italy)
A Tav Falco Christmas	12" Mini LP	2016	Frenzi / Org Music (USA)
Cabaret of Daggers	LP	2018	Frenzi / Org Music
Club Car Zodiac	12" EP	2021	Frenzi / Org Music
Desire on Ice	LP	2025	Frenzi / Org Music
Singles
"Torture" b/w "Garda Che Luna"	7" single	1991	New Rose Records (France)
"Ghostwriter" (Tav Falco) b/w "Into the Garden" (JE & III)	Split 7" Single	1992	Buback Tonträger GmbH (Germany)
"The Drone Danger" b/w "Tram?"	7" single	2017	Blang! (UK)
Compilations curated by Falco
Swamp Surfing in Memphis	Full Length	1986	Frenzi / Au Go Go (Australia)
Tav Falco's Wild & Exotic World Of Musical Obscurities	Double Album	2014	Stag-O-Lee (Germany)
Other compilation appearances
XO for the Holidays, Vol. X	Digital compilation	2021	XO Publicity
