= The Bourgeois Blues =

Song performed by Lead Belly

"The Bourgeois Blues" is a blues song by American folk and blues musician Lead Belly. It was written in June 1937 in response to the discrimination and segregation that he faced during a visit to Washington, DC to record for Alan Lomax. It rails against racism, the Jim Crow laws, and the conditions of contemporary African Americans in the southern United States. The song was recorded in December 1938 for the Library of Congress and re-recorded in 1939 for commercial release.

"The Bourgeois Blues" is regarded as one of Lead Belly's best original works, but it also drew controversy. Questions have been raised over his role in the American Communist Party and whether he and the song were used to further the party's political goals.

== Background and creation ==
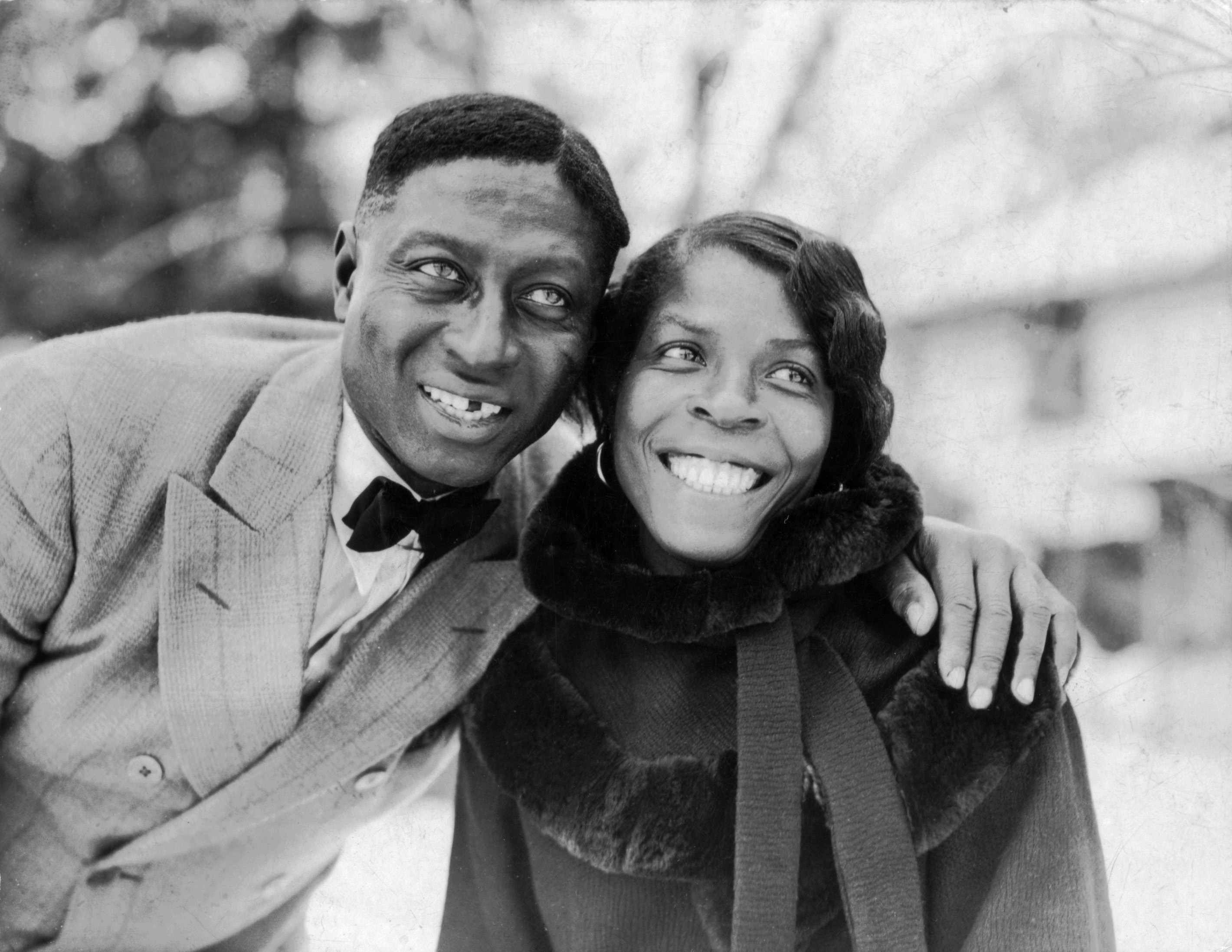
Lead Belly and Martha, whose experiences inspired the song

Most music historians date the writing of "The Bourgeois Blues" to Lead Belly's June 1937 trip to Washington, DC, when he was invited by the folklorist Alan Lomax to record for the Library of Congress's folk music collection. On the first night Lead Belly and his wife Martha spent in the city, they encountered racially discriminatory Jim Crow laws similar to those found in their native Louisiana: most hotels refused to rent rooms to African Americans and the few that would were either full or refused to serve him because he was with a white man (Lomax). Lomax, in some versions of the story described as an unnamed "white friend", offered to let the couple stay for the night in his apartment near the Supreme Court Building. The next morning, Lead Belly awoke to Lomax arguing with his landlord about the presence of a black man, with the landlord threatening to call the police.

While in Washington, Lead Belly encountered several other incidents of segregation that are believed to have contributed to the impetus of the song. For instance, when Lead Belly, Lomax, and their wives wanted to go out to dinner together, they discovered that it was impossible for the mixed race group to find a restaurant that would serve them. Lead Belly was told that if he returned later without Lomax, he would be served.

In response to one of these incidents, a friend of Lead Belly's, variously identified as either Lomax or Mary Elizabeth Barnicle joked that Washington was a "bourgeois town." Though Lead Belly did not know what the word bourgeois meant, he was fascinated by the sound of it, and after its meaning was explained to him he decided to incorporate it into a song about the trip. The song came together quickly; one account claims that it only took a few hours for Lead Belly to write it. Lomax liked it because it was partly based on what happened in his apartment.

== Lyrics, themes and music ==
Lord, in a bourgeois town
Uhm, bourgeois town
I got the bourgeois blues
Gonna spread the news all around

— Refrain

"The Bourgeois Blues" is a blues-style protest song that criticizes the culture of Washington, DC. It protests against both the city's Jim Crow laws and the racism of its white population. Its structure includes several verses and a refrain that declares that the speaker is going to "spread the news all around" about the racial issues plaguing the city. The song, particularly in the refrain, relates race and economics by describing white people as "bourgeois".

The first two verses speak of the segregation that Lead Belly encountered in Washington DC: the first recounts that Lead Belly was "turned down" due to his race wherever he went, while the second recounts the argument between Lomax and his landlord over Lead Belly staying in his apartment. The third verse sarcastically references "the home of the brave, the land of the Free" from "The Star-Spangled Banner", the national anthem of the United States, juxtaposed with the mistreatment he received at the hands of white people in Washington, DC. The fourth verse speaks of the racism of the white population of the city, leading to the song's end, which suggests that African Americans boycott homes in the district.

The song's tone implies that the speaker feels powerless against the discrimination and racism that he encounters; despite this, by "spreading the news" of his poor treatment in a song, the speaker uses what power he has to tell both southern African Americans and northern whites that the status quo is deeply flawed and that something needs to change.

"The Bourgeois Blues" follows a traditional twelve-bar blues format. It is written in 4/4 time but annotated to note that the song rhythmically should swing at medium shuffle. The song was written in B♭. It uses twelve measures with verses one to four repeating, followed by the final two verses and a coda.

== Recordings and adaptions ==
Lead Belly first recorded "The Bourgeois Blues" in December 1938 in New York City, for donation to the Library of Congress. He re-recorded the song in April 1939 for Musicraft Records, for release the same year as a 78 rpm record. The version that was commercially released features Lead Belly singing and playing the twelve-string guitar without any other accompaniment.

The song has been covered and reinterpreted by a variety of artists including Pete Seeger, Ry Cooder, Taj Mahal, Tav Falco's Panther Burns, and Hans Theessink. Seeger recorded and released both live and studio versions of the song on several of his albums. In Australia, the song was reworked as "Canberra Blues" by The Bitter Lemons, an R&B band. The lyrics speak of the problems faced by young Australians in the Australian Capital Territory in the 1960s. Theessink adapted the song to his style of European blues for the album Journey On in 1997.

The Fall covered the song on their 2001 album Are You Are Missing Winner. In 2006 Billy Bragg reworked the song as "Bush War Blues", a topical protest song about the Iraq War. In one verse, he claims that the Iraq War was not for democracy but instead was to "make the world safe for Halliburton". In another, he takes on the Christian right, asking where the moderates are. Finally, Bragg chides the United States government for not dealing with poverty at home before going to war.

== Legacy ==
"The Bourgeois Blues" is one of Lead Belly's most famous songs and is remembered as his most "heartfelt protest song". There is disagreement among music scholars as to its importance. Robert Springer claims that the song is "peripheral" to the wider study of the blues, while Lawson points to it as a watershed in the way African Americans see themselves in the fabric of the United States. There is debate over the relationship between the song and radical politics. After its release, it became popular with left-wing political groups. Lead Belly was invited to perform at Camp Unity, the Communist Party USA's summer retreat, and the FBI subsequently opened a file on him in the 1940s. This led to the accusations that the Communists were taking advantage of him and using him as a platform. The party claims, to the contrary, that they were some of the few people who respected him and gave him a chance to perform.

Ethnomusicologist Jeff Todd Titon claimed in his book Early Downhome Blues that Lead Belly may have had significant help with writing the song, because Lead Belly did not have a history of protest music before his working relationship with Alan Lomax. Titon's claim was acknowledged, but not agreed with, by historian Steven C. Tracy stating "perhaps the term bourgeois is what seems out of place to those who doubt Leadbelly's authorship."
