= Phillips Recording =

Music recording studio in Memphis, Tennessee

Coordinates: 35.14146°N 90.03974°W

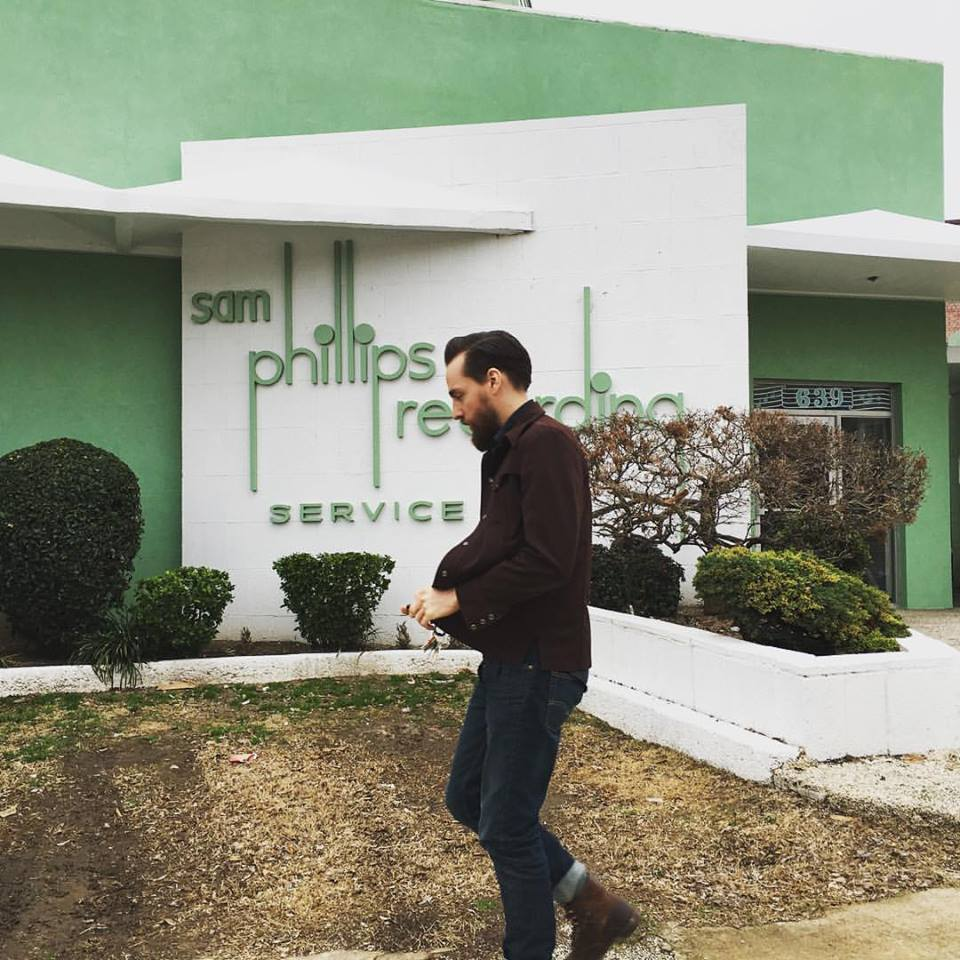
- The exterior of Phillips Recording
- Industry: Recording studio
- Predecessor: Memphis Recording Service
- Founded: Memphis, Tennessee, U.S. (1960)
- Founder: Sam Phillips
- Headquarters: Memphis, Tennessee, U.S.
- Number of locations: 1
- Website: samphillipsrecording.com

Phillips Recording Service is the short name widely used to refer to the Sam C. Phillips Recording Studio established in 1960 by Sun Records and Memphis Recording Service founder Sam Phillips at 639 Madison Avenue in Memphis, Tennessee to replace the older, smaller Memphis Recording Service studio.

== Memphis studio ==
In July 1958, feeling that his Memphis Recording Service/Sun Studio was becoming outdated and too small to accommodate the needs of the record labels and publishing companies of the growing Sam Phillips Recording Organization, Sam Phillips bought a property at 639 Madison Avenue in Memphis, Tennessee, just a few blocks from Sun Studio. The building, which had previously housed a Midas Muffler shop and a bakery, was gutted to build two recording studios on the ground floor, A&R and promotion offices on the second floor, and offices for accounting, publishing, and Phillips himself on the third floor. The new studio, Sam Phillips Recording Service, opened in 1960, with Scotty Moore being named studio manager. In 1965, Sam the Sham and the Pharaohs recorded their hit song "Wooly Bully" at the studio.

By the end of the 1960s, Sam Phillips mostly retired from the recording business, and his sons Knox and Jerry worked in the studio, which hosted sessions by The Yardbirds, Willie Nelson, Amazing Rhythm Aces, Alex Chilton, Bobby Doyle, John Prine, and The Cramps. Knox Phillips managed the studio until his death on April 13, 2020. The studio, still an analog-based facility utilizing much of its original equipment from the 1960s, is still owned and operated by the Sam Phillips family.

== Other locations ==
In the early 1960s, Phillips Recording also had a short-lived demo studio in Tupelo, Mississippi, as well as a studio in Nashville. The Sam Phillips Recording Service of Nashville was opened in 1961 in the top floor of the Cumberland Building, a former Masonic Lodge at 315 Seventh Avenue North, next to the WSM radio studio. Notable songs produced at this studio include Jerry Lee Lewis' 1961 version of "What'd I Say", The Dixiebelles 1963 song "(Down at) Papa Joe's", the 1963 version of "Yakety Sax" that would become Boots Randolph's signature song, and Ronny & the Daytonas hit 1964 song "G.T.O". In 1962, producer Billy Sherrill was hired to manage the studio at the start of his career. Sherrill moved to Epic Records the following year, and Phillips sold the studio to Monument Records and renamed the Fred Foster Sound Studio in 1964.
