= Automatic writing (disambiguation) =

Automatic writing is a claimed psychic ability allowing a person to produce written words without consciously writing.

Automatic writing may also refer to:

- Surrealist automatism, a method of art-making in which the artist suppresses conscious control over the making process, allowing the unconscious mind to have great sway
- Autopen, a mechanical device used for the replicated signing of a human signature
- Automatic Writing, a 1979 composition by Robert Ashley
- Automatic Writing (album), a 2004 album by Ataxia
  - AW II (Automatic Writing II), a 2007 album by Ataxia

== See also ==
- Automatic painting (disambiguation)
