= A Sphere in the Heart of Silence =

Studio album by John Frusciante and Josh Klinghoffer
- Released: November 23, 2004
- Recorded: April 9 –11, 2004
- Genre: Electronic rock, glitch, industrial, experimental rock, art rock
- Length: 37:39
- Label: Record Collection
- Producer: John Frusciante, Josh Klinghoffer

John Frusciante chronology
Inside of Emptiness (2004)	A Sphere in the Heart of Silence (2004)	Curtains (2005)

Josh Klinghoffer chronology
Automatic Writing (2004)	A Sphere in the Heart of Silence (2004)	AW II (2007)

Professional ratings
Review scores
Source	Rating
AllMusic	3/5 stars
Cokemachineglow	73%
DIY	3.5/5 stars

A Sphere in the Heart of Silence is a collaborative studio album by John Frusciante and Josh Klinghoffer, released on November 23, 2004 on Record Collection. The fifth in a series of six releases Frusciante issued, from June 2004 to February 2005, the album is composed mainly of electronica-based material.

Frusciante notes, "It's electronic music, but much more raw. We recorded this the same way we did Inside of Emptiness - with all the out-of-control qualities that I've been building toward with my style of playing and recording - but we used electronic instruments. There are some techno things with punk-rock-type screaming vocals. It's only a seven-song album, but it's, like thirty-eight minutes long."

The vinyl edition of the record saw a repressing from Record Collection on December 11, 2012. These reissued records are 180 gram and come with a download of choice between MP3 and WAV formats of the album.

== Track listing ==
All tracks are written by John Frusciante and Josh Klinghoffer.

No.	Title	Length
1.	"Sphere"	8:29
2.	"The Afterglow"	5:19
3.	"Walls"	6:19
4.	"Communique"	6:55
5.	"At Your Enemies"	4:23
6.	"Surrogate People"	5:20
7.	"My Life"	1:35
Total length:		37:39

== Personnel ==
Musicians

- John Frusciante – programming, white noise, guitar, lead vocals (on "The Afterglow", "Walls", and "My Life"), backing vocals, vocal treatments, synthetic strings, drum treatments, acoustic guitar, synthesizer, bass, piano, producer, design
- Josh Klinghoffer – arp string ensemble, guitar, bass, synthesizers, drum loops, drums, lead vocals (on "Communique", "At Your Enemies", and "Surrogate People"), backing vocals, one note synth, piano, producer

Production

- Ryan Hewitt – engineer, mixing
- Chris Reynolds – assistant
- Jason Gossman – assistant
- Bernie Grundman – mastering
- Lola Montes Schnabel – photography
- Mike Piscitelli – design
- Dave Lee – equipment technician
