= The Brown Bunny =

2003 film directed by Vincent Gallo

- Theatrical release poster
- Directed by: Vincent Gallo
- Written by: Vincent Gallo
- Produced by: Vincent Gallo
- Starring: Vincent Gallo; Chloë Sevigny
- Cinematography: Vincent Gallo
- Edited by: Vincent Gallo
- Music by: Jackson C. Frank; Jeff Alexander; Gordon Lightfoot; Ted Curson; Accardo Quartet; John Frusciante; Vincent Gallo (Note: Uncredited)
- Production companies: Wild Bunch; Vincent Gallo Productions; Gray Daisy Films
- Distributed by: Wellspring
- Release dates: May 21, 2003 (Cannes); August 27, 2004 (United States)
- Running time: 119 minutes (Original Cannes cut); 93 minutes (Edited cut)
- Countries: United States; Japan
- Language: English
- Budget: $10 million
- Box office: $630,427

The Brown Bunny is a 2003 independent, erotic, romance, and road drama film written, directed, produced, photographed, and edited by Vincent Gallo. Starring Gallo and Chloë Sevigny, it tells the story of a motorcycle racer on a cross-country drive who is haunted by memories of his former lover. It was photographed with handheld 16 mm cameras in various locations throughout the United States, including New Hampshire, Massachusetts, Ohio, Missouri, Utah, Nevada, and California.

After it premiered at the 2003 Cannes Film Festival, the film garnered a great deal of media attention because of an explicit scene where Sevigny performs unsimulated fellatio on Gallo, as well as a feud between Gallo and the film critic Roger Ebert. Ebert called The Brown Bunny the worst film in the history of Cannes, although he later gave a re-edited version his signature "thumbs up", awarding the film three out of four stars.

The film received mixed and heavily polarized reviews from critics, and was nominated for several accolades, including the Palme d'Or. It won the FIPRESCI Prize from the Viennale. The film has since gained a small cult following.

== Plot ==
Motorcycle racer Bud Clay undertakes a cross-country drive, following a race in New Hampshire, in order to participate in a race in California. All the while he is haunted by memories of his former lover, Daisy. On his journey he meets three women, but Bud seems to be a lost soul, and he is unable to form an emotional connection with any of them. He first meets Violet at a gas station in New Hampshire and persuades her to join him on his trip. They stop at her home in order to get her clothes, but he drives off as soon as she enters the house.

Bud's next stop is the home of Daisy's parents, the location of Daisy's brown bunny. Daisy's mother does not remember Bud, who grew up in the house next door, nor does she remember having visited Bud and Daisy in California. Next, Bud stops at a pet shelter, where he asks about the life expectancy of rabbits (he is told it is about five or six years). At a highway rest stop, he meets a distressed woman, Lilly. He comforts and kisses her, before starting to cry and eventually leaving her. Bud appears more distressed as the road trip continues, crying as he drives. He stops at the Bonneville Speedway to race his motorcycle. In Las Vegas, he drives around prostitutes on street corners, before deciding to ask one of them, Rose, to join him for a lunch. She eats McDonald's food in his truck until he stops, pays her, and leaves her back on the street.

After having his motorcycle checked in a Los Angeles garage, Bud stops at Daisy's house, which appears abandoned. He leaves a note on the door frame, after sitting in his truck in the driveway remembering about kissing Daisy in this place and checks in at a hotel. Daisy eventually appears there. She seems nervous, going to the bathroom twice to smoke crack cocaine, while Bud waits for her, sitting on his bed. As she proposes to go out to buy something to drink, Bud tells her that, because of what happened the last time they saw each other, he does not drink anymore.

They have an argument about Daisy kissing other men. At this point, Bud undresses Daisy and she fellates him. Once done, he insults her as they lie in bed, talking about what happened during their last meeting. Bud continuously asks Daisy why she had been involved with some men at a party. She explains that she was just being friendly and wanted to smoke marijuana with them. Bud becomes upset because Daisy was pregnant, and it transpires that the baby died as a result of what happened at this party.

Through flashback scenes, the viewer understands that Daisy was raped at the party, a scene witnessed by Bud, who did not intervene. Daisy asks Bud why he did not help her, and his feelings of guilt about this are considerable. He tells her that he did not know what to do, and so he decided to leave the party. After he came back a bit later, he saw an ambulance in front of the house and Daisy explains to Bud that she is dead, having passed out prior to the rape and then choked to death on her own vomit. Bud awakens the next morning, alone; his encounter with Daisy turns out to have been a figment of his imagination. The movie ends as Bud is driving his truck in California, alone again and still not with what he needs.

== Cast ==
- Vincent Gallo as Bud Clay
- Chloë Sevigny as Daisy Lemon
- Cheryl Tiegs as Lilly
- Elizabeth Blake as Rose
- Anna Vareschi as Violet
- Mary Morasky as Mrs. Lemon

== Production and release ==
Gallo conceived the film's title before writing its story. He is fond of the color brown, and rabbits are his favorite animal.

The film was shot in 16 mm and then blown up in 35 mm, which gives the photography a typical "old-school grain". Gallo reportedly shot the film using two Aaton 16mm cameras, Super Baltar lenses, a Nagra IV-STC recorder, and an Angénieux zoom lens purchased from The Stanley Kubrick Estate. Vincent Gallo credited himself as director of the photography as well as one of the three camera operators along with Toshiaki Ozawa and John Clemens.

During the film's production, Gallo stated that he became "almost maniacal" in trying to create the film. He personally painted Bud's motorcycle, which appears in the film's opening race sequence, "dozens of times to get just the right shade of gold." Gallo stated that he fainted twice during the film's production, due to exhaustion from working.

The film's opening race scene was shot at the New Hampshire Motor Speedway. The U.S. theatrical version of the film has been cut by about 25 minutes compared to the version shown at Cannes, removing a large part of the initial scene at the race track (about four minutes shorter), about six minutes of music and black screen at the end of the film, and about seven minutes of driving before the scene in the Bonneville Speedway.

Neither Anna Vareschi nor Elizabeth Blake, both in the film, were professional actresses. Kirsten Dunst and Winona Ryder were both attached to the project but left. In an interview from The Guardian, Sevigny said of the sex scene: "It was tough, the toughest thing I've ever done, but Vincent was very sensitized to my needs, very gentle.... And we'd been intimate in the past." Actress Jennifer Jason Leigh was initially set to play the role that Sevigny played, including the unsimulated oral sex scene, but ultimately turned the role down due to being in a relationship at the time.

For the film's promotion, a trailer was released featuring a split screen in the style of Andy Warhol's Chelsea Girls, depicting on one side of the screen a single point-of-view-shot of a driver on a country road, and the other side various scenes from the end of the film featuring Chloë Sevigny. Neither side of the screen had any audio tracks attached, although the song "Milk and Honey" by folk singer Jackson C. Frank played over the trailer's duration.

== Themes and analysis ==
Gallo, a conservative and teetotaler, has stated that he views The Brown Bunny as "a celebration of America that is virulently anti-drug and anti-pornography." The film explores themes of masculinity, depression, loneliness, social alienation, romantic love, and self-esteem.

The film also uses flower motifs, with Bud Clay's four female romantic interests each being named after flowers: Daisy, Lily, Rose, and Violet.

The film's title is evoked three times within the film, referencing Daisy's pet bunny, a bunny seen in a pet store by Clay, and to a chocolate bunny that Bud once gave to Daisy. Film critic Richard von Busack of Metroactive interpreted that when Clay asks "'How long do these bunnies live?'...he's really asking, 'How long does love last?' and he's chilled by the pet-store owner's answer: 'Five or six years at the most.'"

On the film's sex scene, Randy Kennedy of The New York Times wrote that the film's "sex scene does seem like the antithesis of pornography. The camera and microphones are so close to the characters that the familiar sense of voyeuristic distance is impossible to maintain." Film critic Roger Ebert wrote that the film's controversial sex scene "and its dialogue, and a flashback to the Daisy character at a party, work together to illuminate complex things about Bud's sexuality, his guilt, and his feelings about women...Gallo takes the materials of pornography and repurposes them into a scene about control and need, fantasy and perhaps even madness. That scene is many things, but erotic is not one of them."

The Georgetown Voice also called the sex scene "Raw, gripping and slightly repulsive", comparing it to a similar scene in Requiem for a Dream, while emphasizing the un-erotic nature of both. The Chicago Tribune reached a similar conclusion, describing the sex scene as "almost nothing really sexy or pleasurable. It's desperate, hollow: a lover reaching for emotions that have shriveled up."

In 2018, Gallo further explained the film's anti-pornographic themes, writing in an open letter:

The Brown Bunny was an attempt at maintaining illusions and simultaneously presenting a heightened and enhanced version of reality, while hoping to result in new forms of insight into pathological behavior.

I was also interested in a character that even during sex could not let his mind go blank and fill up with the sex. Instead, while having sex he is rapidly thinking and his thoughts have a range of emotions far away from pleasure. This strange behavior juxtaposed against graphic real sex is disturbing.

The common purpose of pornography is to enhance sexual pleasure or sexual fantasy...I chose to use imagery common in pornography but placed these images in the emotional context which included intense guilt, anger, regret, anguish, and confusion. In this context, it is difficult for the images to enhance sexual pleasure or sexual fantasy. Instead, the graphic images work better to enhance the discomfort of intimacy.

The Georgetown Voice concluded that "Whether Bud Clay represents the modern individual condemned to mechanical sex, like T.S. Eliot's The Waste Land, or serves as a reflection of the male condition at the intersection of love, sex and possession, The Brown Bunny is Gallo's brutal depiction of one man's tragic reality."

Steven Hyden of Grantland similarly opined that "The Brown Bunny can be viewed as a depiction of the neediness and alienation at the core of traditional masculinity. Its final scene is perhaps best read as a critique of pornographic imagery, and a demonstration of how disturbing real live sex onscreen can be when human feeling isn't forcibly removed."

Filmmaker Josh Safdie also wrote that "No matter how many times you run it over in your head, no matter how many times you act it out, ride a motorcycle, hit the road, you're alone with yourself and you always come back to the same thoughts and that is loneliness...That is why The Brown Bunny is Gallo's best work. Self expression at its dire straights [sic] and most important." Filmmaker David Lowery described the film as a self-flagellation of "male ego".

Film critic Tony McKibbin also observed the film's focus on American culture, writing: "As [Clay] travels from St Louis to Salt Lake City, Gallo shows us the 'Other America', the offscreen space of a Hollywood cinema that usually suggests all the fret and anxiety lies at the end of a gun rather than in bills to pay, poor diets, low salaries and illness. This the reality Gallo is attuned to as he conveys the pockets of a life."

Charles Taylor of Salon.com similarly wrote that "Anyone who has ever driven for any stretch through any part of America will recognize the look of the film immediately...the view driving through suburban neighborhoods, the feel of entering some quiet enclave simply by turning a corner, the sense that everything is sleeping yet alive...It's all so familiar it feels as if the images have been plucked from your brain, and yet I can't recall any movie that has gotten the look of America that this one has...Even the hookers who approach Bud's van at every corner aren't the usual overdone movie hookers. They look like real people in awful circumstances, and each one makes you wonder, what's her story?".

== Controversies ==
=== Cannes reception ===
The film was entered into the 2003 Cannes Film Festival. It was reportedly heckled as the film began, with the crowd jeering every time Gallo's name appeared during the credits. Seiichi Tsukada, an executive at Kinetique, the Japanese company that provided the financing for The Brown Bunny, said "I was at Cannes. I felt injustice. The bashing in Cannes is not for Brown Bunny. I think they're bashing Vincent. I don't know why."

Upon ending, Gallo stated that the film also received a 15-minute standing ovation. Sevigny's publicist, Amanda Horton, also stated that the film was applauded for 10 minutes.

Gallo later stated that the Cannes premiere was "the worst feeling I ever had in my life."

==== Gallo–Ebert feud ====
After the Cannes premiere, a war of words erupted between Gallo and film critic Roger Ebert, with Ebert writing that The Brown Bunny was the worst film in the history of Cannes. Ebert also wrote that Sevigny "reportedly cried during the screening", a statement repudiated by both Gallo and Sevigny's publicist, Amanda Horton.

Gallo retorted by calling Ebert a "fat pig with the physique of a slave trader." Paraphrasing a statement attributed to Winston Churchill, Ebert responded with, "It is true that I am fat, but one day I will be thin, and he will still be the director of The Brown Bunny." Gallo then claimed to have put a hex on Ebert's colon, cursing the critic with cancer. In response, Ebert quipped that watching a video of his colonoscopy had been more entertaining than watching The Brown Bunny.

Gallo subsequently stated that the hex had actually been placed on Ebert's prostate and that he had intended the comment to be a joke which was mistakenly taken seriously by a journalist. He also conceded to finding Ebert's colonoscopy comment to be an amusing comeback.

A shorter, re-edited version of the film played later in 2003 at the Toronto International Film Festival (although it still retained the controversial sex scene). The new version was regarded more highly by some, even Ebert, who gave the new cut three stars out of a possible four.

In 2004, Gallo appeared on The Howard Stern Show, and discussed his feud with Ebert, saying they had made peace. Ebert called into the show and talked with Gallo, and the two laughed and joked about their feud. However, Gallo continued to push back on Ebert's claim that the original and re-edited versions of the film were vastly different.

On the August 28, 2004, episode of the television show Ebert & Roeper, Ebert gave the new version of the film a "thumbs up" rating. In a column published about the same time, Ebert reported that he and Gallo had made peace. According to Ebert:

Gallo went back into the editing room and cut 26 minutes of his 118-minute film, or almost a quarter of the running time. And in the process he transformed it. The film's form and purpose now emerge from the miasma of the original cut, and are quietly, sadly, effective. It is said that editing is the soul of the cinema; in the case of The Brown Bunny, it is its salvation.

In 2018 (five years after Ebert's death), however, Gallo once again rebuked Ebert's statement, calling it "both far-fetched and an outright lie." According to Gallo, "If you didn't like the unfinished film at Cannes, you didn't like the finished film, and vice versa." Gallo went on to speculate that Ebert wanted to distance himself from "a brutal, dismissive review of a film that other, more serious critics eventually felt differently about." In addition, Gallo incorrectly claimed, contrary to media reports, that the film's final cut was only eight minutes shorter than the Cannes cut, not 26 minutes shorter as Ebert had noted.

In 2022, Gallo further rebuked the claim, he stated that only around five minutes were cut, and the estimate of 25 minutes came from Gallo providing an overestimated runtime to Cannes.

=== Sex scene ===
The film's sex scene, in which Sevigny performs unsimulated oral sex upon Gallo, received an overwhelmingly negative critical response at its Cannes premiere. It became a media scandal.

In August 2004, upon the film's limited theatrical release in the United States, Sevigny took to defending the film and its final scene, stating "It's a shame people write so many things when they haven't seen it. When you see the film, it makes more sense. It's an art film. It should be playing in museums. It's like an Andy Warhol movie."

Despite the negative backlash toward Sevigny's involvement in the film, some critics praised her decision. New York Times reviewer Manohla Dargis said:

Even in the age of Girls Gone Wild, it's genuinely startling to see a name actress throw caution and perhaps her career to the wind. But give the woman credit. Actresses have been asked and even bullied into performing similar acts for filmmakers since the movies began, usually behind closed doors. Ms. Sevigny isn't hiding behind anyone's desk. She says her lines with feeling and puts her iconoclasm right out there where everyone can see it; she may be nuts, but she's also unforgettable.

Seven years later, in an interview for Playboy's January 2011 issue, Sevigny talked about the oral sex scene in the film: "What's happened with that is all very complicated. There are a lot of emotions. I'll probably have to go to therapy at some point. But I love Vincent. The film is tragic and beautiful, and I'm proud of it and my performance. I'm sad that people think one way of the movie, but what can you do? I've done many explicit sex scenes, but I'm not that interested in doing any more. I'm more self-aware now and wouldn't be able to be as free, so why even do it?"

== Reception ==
=== Critical response ===
The Brown Bunny received mixed reviews from critics and holds a rating of 47% on Rotten Tomatoes, based on 96 reviews with an average score of 5.3/10. The website's critics consensus states "More dull than hypnotic, The Brown Bunny is a pretentious and self-indulgent bore." Metacritic gives the film a score of 51 out of 100 based on reviews from 30 critics, indicating "Mixed or average reviews".

French cinema magazine Les Cahiers du Cinéma voted The Brown Bunny one of the ten best films of 2004. American publication Film Comment included it among the best unreleased films of 2003, ranking it 14th. In 2010, The Daily Telegraph went on to list The Brown Bunny as one of the 100 "defining" films of the decade, calling it the decade's "most reviled" film, but saying it was "destined to become a future lost classic."

The film won the FIPRESCI Prize at the Vienna International Film Festival for its "bold exploration of yearning and grief and for its radical departure from dominant tendencies in current American filmmaking". The film, aside from the feud with Roger Ebert, gained some positive reaction from American critics as well. Neva Chonin of the San Francisco Chronicle called it "a somber poem of a film sure to frustrate those who prefer resolution to ambiguity... like an inscrutably bad dream, [it] lingers on."

Conversely, Moria McDonald of The Seattle Times gave the film a negative review, calling it a "self-indulgent and seemingly endless road movie".

The film was praised by other filmmakers including Claire Denis, Jean-Luc Godard, John Waters, Sean Penn, and Werner Herzog who called it "the best portrayal of the particular loneliness a man feels." Filmmaker Josh Safdie listed it among the top 10 greatest films of all time, in the 2012 Sight & Sound poll. In 2023, filmmaker David Lowery listed The Brown Bunny among his top five favorite films.

=== Box office ===
According to The Numbers, the film grossed $366,301 domestically, and $264,126 internationally, for a worldwide total of $630,427. It was domestically released in 19 theaters.

The Numbers also reported that the film had a production budget of $10 million, though this has not been confirmed by Gallo. Gallo declined to reveal the exact cost of the film, but stated "most of the money that was spent on the movie was spent to do very technical things that are very modern, like intermediary digital processing, uncompressed editing, film composition techniques." He also added that the film's crew never exceed three people during production.

Multiple publications have referred to the film's production budget as very low, contrasting greatly with the reported $10 million number.

== Soundtrack ==
The Brown Bunny

Soundtrack album by John Frusciante & Various Artists
- Released: May 4, 2004
- Labels: Tulip Records, Twelve Suns

John Frusciante chronology
Shadows Collide with People (2004)	The Brown Bunny (2004)	The Will to Death (2004)

The motion picture soundtrack to The Brown Bunny was released exclusively in Japan. The first five tracks were from artists Gordon Lightfoot, Jackson C. Frank, Matisse/Accardo Quartet, Jeff Alexander and Ted Curson. The final five tracks were performed by John Frusciante.

No.	Title	Writer(s)	Length
1.	"Come Wander with Me"	Jeff Alexander	2:56
2.	"Tears for Dolphy"	Ted Curson	8:30
3.	"Milk and Honey"	Jackson C. Frank	3:38
4.	"Beautiful"	Gordon Lightfoot	3:22
5.	"Smooth"	Matisse/Accardo Quartet	3:56
6.	"Forever Away"	John Frusciante	6:40
7.	"Dying Song"	Frusciante	3:43
8.	"Leave All the Days Behind"	Frusciante	1:54
9.	"Prostitution Song"	Frusciante	3:06
10.	"Falling"	Frusciante	4:46
Total length:			42:31

=== Soundtrack re-release ===
Australian indie label Twelve Suns re-issued The Brown Bunny soundtrack on deluxe gatefold vinyl on April 26, 2014. This reissue was fully authorized by Vincent Gallo and remastered from his master recordings. The re-issue was limited to 1000 copies. The first 5 tracks are from the film The Brown Bunny. The last 5 tracks were written before the movie and used as inspiration during filming.

Japanese label Tulip Records released another re-issue of the soundtrack on gatefold vinyl in October 2021, also limited to 1000 copies. It was the first vinyl pressing to be released domestically in the U.S.. Designed by Gallo, the cover features a woman performing fellatio, though it is not a still from the film. The packaging features a note from Gallo. Commenting on the cover, he stated that it was made to represent how the film was viewed on release, "It is the ultimate expression of the journalistic consensus on the film, the public's resulting reaction to that consensus, and the feeling they then thought about me personally".

== Home media ==
In the U.S., Sony Pictures Home Entertainment released the film on DVD on August 16, 2005.

In October 2021, the film received a limited edition release on Blu-ray, limited to 250 copies. It features the same cover art and packaging note as the vinyl release of the same year.

== Awards and nominations ==
Year	Award	Category	Result
2003	Cannes Film Festival	Palme d'Or	Nominated
2003	Thessaloniki International Film Festival	Golden Alexander	Nominated
2003	Vienna International Film Festival	FIPRESCI Prize	Won
2003	Village Voice Film Poll	Best Undistributed Film	Nominated
2004	Cahiers du Cinéma	Top Ten Film Award	Sixth place; tied

== See also ==
- Art house films
- Independent films
- List of American films of 2004
