= Enclosure (John Frusciante album) =

Studio album by John Frusciante
- Released: April 8, 2014
- Recorded: 2012–2013
- Genre: Synth-pop, lo-fi, experimental rock
- Length: 37:37; 48:41 (Japanese release)
- Label: Record Collection
- Producer: John Frusciante

John Frusciante chronology
Outsides (2013)	Enclosure (2014)	Trickfinger (2015)

Enclosure is the tenth studio album by American musician John Frusciante, released on April 8, 2014 (7 April in UK) on Record Collection.

On February 18, 2014, Frusciante made the first song recorded for the album, "Scratch", a song written during The Empyrean sessions, available through his website as a free download.

On March 19, 2018, Frusciante uploaded a version of "Scratch", "(vocal Fx Mix)", to SoundCloud.

== Background ==
Frusciante said of the album, "Enclosure, upon its completion, was the record which represented the achievement of all the musical goals I had been aiming at for the previous 5 years. It was recorded simultaneously with Black Knights' Medieval Chamber, and as different as the two albums appear to be, they represent one investigative creative thought process. What I learned from one fed directly into the other. Enclosure is presently my last word on the musical statement which began with PBX."

== Release in space ==
On March 29, 2014, a copy of Enclosure was loaded onto an experimental Cube Satellite dubbed by Record Collection as Sat-JF14 and launched to an altitude of 10,000 ft aboard an Interorbital Systems NEPTUNE Modular Rocket.

Beginning March 31, fans from around the world could download the free, custom-built Sat-JF14 mobile application which was meant to enable users to track the satellite movement in real time (the satellite, however, was only a simulation, as the rocket only reached an altitude of 10,000 ft or 3,048 meters before safely falling to the ground for recovery). When "Sat-JF14" "hovered" over a users’ geographic region, the Enclosure app would get unlocked, allowing users to listen to the album for free on any iOS or Android mobile device.

== Reception ==
Professional ratings
Aggregate scores
Source	Rating
Metacritic	55/100
Review scores
Source	Rating
AllMusic	3/5 stars
American Songwriter	3/5 stars
Classic Rock	6/10
Consequence of Sound	C−
Magnet	3.5/5 stars
Mojo	3/5 stars
No Ripcord	6/10
Q	2/5 stars

At Metacritic, which assigns a weighted mean rating out of 100 to reviews from mainstream critics, the album received an average score of 55, based on nine reviews, which indicates "mixed or average reviews".

== Track listing ==
All tracks are written by John Frusciante.

No.	Title	Length
1.	"Shining Desert"	4:46
2.	"Sleep"	4:23
3.	"Run"	2:15
4.	"Stage"	3:09
5.	"Fanfare"	4:50
6.	"Cinch"	6:25
7.	"Zone"	4:07
8.	"Crowded"	3:47
9.	"Excuses"	3:53
Total length:		37:37

Japanese Bonus Tracks
No.	Title	Length
10.	"Vesiou"	4:18
11.	"Scratch"	6:26
Total length:		48:41

== Personnel ==
=== Musicians ===
- John Frusciante – all instruments (guitar, bass, vocals, keyboards, synthesizers, drum machine, sequencer, samples)

=== Recording personnel ===
- John Frusciante – producer
- Anthony Zamora – studio manager

=== Artwork ===
- John Frusciante and Julian Chavez – artwork
- Nabil – cover photo
- Meryl Slay – retouching

== Charts ==
Chart performance for Enclosure
Chart	Peak position
Belgian Albums (Ultratop Flanders)	112
US Heatseekers Albums (Billboard)	16
