= Curtains (John Frusciante album) =

Studio album by John Frusciante
- Released: February 1, 2005
- Recorded: May 8–14 and May 19–23, 2004
- Genre: Acoustic, rock, indie folk
- Length: 33:42
- Label: Record Collection
- Producer: John Frusciante

John Frusciante chronology
A Sphere in the Heart of Silence (2004)	Curtains (2005)	AW II (2007)

John Frusciante solo chronology
A Sphere in the Heart of Silence (2004)	Curtains (2005)	The Empyrean (2009)

Professional ratings
Review scores
Source	Rating
AllMusic	4/5 stars
Soul Shine Magazine	4/5 stars
Ultimate Guitar	9.9/10

Curtains is the seventh solo album by American musician John Frusciante, released on February 1, 2005 on Record Collection. The album is primarily an acoustic album, in contrast to his previous album, A Sphere in the Heart of Silence, a mostly electronic collaboration with Josh Klinghoffer. According to Frusciante, the album was recorded in his living room: "It was just me sitting on a pillow, on my living room floor, with my back leaning against the couch."

The album features contributions from Autolux drummer Carla Azar, upright bassist Ken Wild, and The Mars Volta guitarist Omar Rodríguez-López, with Frusciante noting, "Carla from the band Autolux plays drums. I loved having a feminine energy. My friend Omar Rodriguez-Lopez of the Mars Volta played some guitar. He and I do these solos together where we're using the same amp at the same time."

A video was released for "The Past Recedes".

The vinyl edition of the record saw a repressing from Record Collection on December 11, 2012. These reissued records are 180 gram and come with a download of choice between MP3 and WAV formats of the album.

The album cover is reproduced from 17th-century painting "Aeneas and the Sibyl in the Underworld" by the Flemish painter Jan Brueghel the Younger.

== Track listing ==
All tracks are written by John Frusciante.

No.	Title	Length
1.	"The Past Recedes"	3:53
2.	"Lever Pulled"	2:22
3.	"Anne"	3:35
4.	"The Real"	3:06
5.	"A Name"	2:03
6.	"Control"	4:29
7.	"Your Warning"	3:33
8.	"Hope"	1:56
9.	"Ascension"	2:52
10.	"Time Tonight"	3:12
11.	"Leap Your Bar"	2:36
Total length:		33:42

2019 Bonus Tracks
No.	Title	Length
12.	"Become (demo)"	3:58
13.	"Time Tonight (demo)"	3:05
14.	"Drill (demo)"	2:23
Total length:		43:08

== Personnel ==
- John Frusciante – vocals, acoustic and electric guitar, electric bass, melodica, piano, string ensemble, mellotron, synthesizer, treatments, producer, design
- Omar Rodríguez-López – lead guitar on "Lever Pulled", joined lead guitar with Frusciante on "Anne"
- Carla Azar – drums
- Ken Wild – double bass

Production

- Didier Martín – production
- Ryan Hewitt – engineer, mixing
- Chris Holmes – additional mixing
- Bernie Grundman – mastering
- Lola Montes – photography
- Mike Piscitelli – design
- Dave Lee – equipment technician
