= Letur-Lefr =

EP by John Frusciante solo
- Released: July 17th, 2012 (International); July 16th, 2012 (Europe); July 4th, 2012 (Japan)
- Recorded: 2010
- Genre: Electronica, experimental rock, hip hop, progressive psytrance
- Length: 15:56
- Label: Record Collection

John Frusciante solo chronology
The Empyrean (2009)	Letur-Lefr (2012)	PBX Funicular Intaglio Zone (2012)

John Frusciante chronology
Speed Dealer Moms EP (2010)	Letur-Lefr (2012)	Sect In Sgt (2012)

Letur-Lefr (pronunciation: /'lɛtɹ̩ 'lɛfɹ̩/) is the fourth EP by John Frusciante, released on July 17, 2012 on Record Collection. It was released in multiple formats including 32-bit digital download and cassette. The EP features Frusciante singing, playing all the instruments and engineering, as well as his ex-wife performing backing vocals and a "few friends on vocals, mostly MC'ing".

Frusciante said of this album and its follow-up, PBX Funicular Intaglio Zone, "I consider my music to be Progressive Synth Pop, which says nothing about what it sounds like, but does describe my basic approach. I combine aspects of many styles of music and create my own musical forms by way of electronic instruments. The tracks on Letur-Lefr were recorded in 2010 and PBX was recorded in 2011. Letur is a compilation, a selected portion of music I made that year while PBX was conceived as an album, the songs having been recorded in succession. The records are very different from each other."

== Title ==
According to Frusciante, the EP's title "signifies the transition of two becoming one, notably symbolized by the first song on the album being the sequel to the album's last."

Professional ratings
Review scores
Source	Rating
Allmusic	3/5 stars

== Track listing ==
All tracks are written by John Frusciante.

No.	Title	Length
1.	"In Your Eyes"	4:27
2.	"909 Day"	2:24
3.	"Glowe"	1:31
4.	"FM"	3:42
5.	"In My Light"	3:49
Total length:		15:56

== Personnel ==
=== Musicians ===
- John Frusciante - vocals, backing vocals (stated as "female backing vocals" on booklet), synthesizers, guitar, samples, drum machine
- Nicole Turley - vocals (1)
- RZA - vocals (2, 5)
- Leggezin Fin - vocals (2)
- Masia One - vocals (2, 3)
- Kinetic 9 - vocals (2, 4)
- Rugged Monk - vocals (4)

=== Recording personnel ===
- John Frusciante - production
- Anthony Zamora - studio manager

=== Artwork ===
- John Frusciante - cover art and design
- Julian Chavez - cover design

== Charts ==
Chart (2012)	Peak position
US Top Heatseekers (Billboard)	10
US Top Independent Albums (Billboard)	38
