= DC EP =

EP by John Frusciante
- Released: September 14, 2004
- Recorded: February 9–10, 2004
- Studio: Inner Ear Studios, Arlington, Virginia
- Genre: Alternative rock
- Length: 14:49
- Label: Record Collection
- Producer: Ian MacKaye

John Frusciante chronology
Automatic Writing (2004)	DC EP (2004)	Inside of Emptiness (2004)

Professional ratings
Review scores
Source	Rating
Allmusic	3/5 stars
Rolling Stone	(favorable)

DC EP is the third EP by John Frusciante, released on September 14, 2004 on Record Collection. Produced by Ian Mackaye of Fugazi, the EP is the third recording in a series of six, released from June 2004 to February 2005, by Frusciante.

According to Frusciante: "These songs were written while I was on tour for By the Way. I was listening to the Velvet Underground a lot. It's only four songs and fifteen minutes long. I'm used to producing my records myself, and when I left that in the hands of Fugazi's Ian MacKaye, using equipment that wasn't mine, playing instruments that weren't mine, everything was different." The guitar tracks that appear were recorded with one of Guy Picciotto's Marshall JCM 800 amplifiers, the same featured on the artwork for the Fugazi album, Red Medicine. For the guitar solo on "Dissolve," Frusciante also used Picciotto's Les Paul Junior.

On the vinyl release of the EP, the words "And then the past" were inscribed on side A, and "I never see you" on side B, referring to Frusciante's forthcoming album, Curtains.

The vinyl edition of the record saw a repressing from Record Collection on December 11, 2012. These reissued records are 180 gram and come with a download of choice between MP3 and WAV formats of the album.

The title DC EP refers to the place near where it was recorded, Washington, D.C.. The album was recorded at Inner Ear Studios in nearby Arlington, Virginia.

== Track listing ==
All tracks are written by John Frusciante.

No.	Title	Length
1.	"Dissolve"	4:27
2.	"Goals"	3:21
3.	"A Corner"	3:35
4.	"Repeating"	3:24
Total length:		14:49

== Personnel ==
- John Frusciante – vocals, guitar, bass, design
- Jerry Busher – drums

Production

- Ian MacKaye – producing
- Don Zientara – engineering
- Bernie Grundman – mastering
- Lola Montes – photography
- Mike Piscitelli – design
