= John Frusciante =

American guitarist (born 1970)

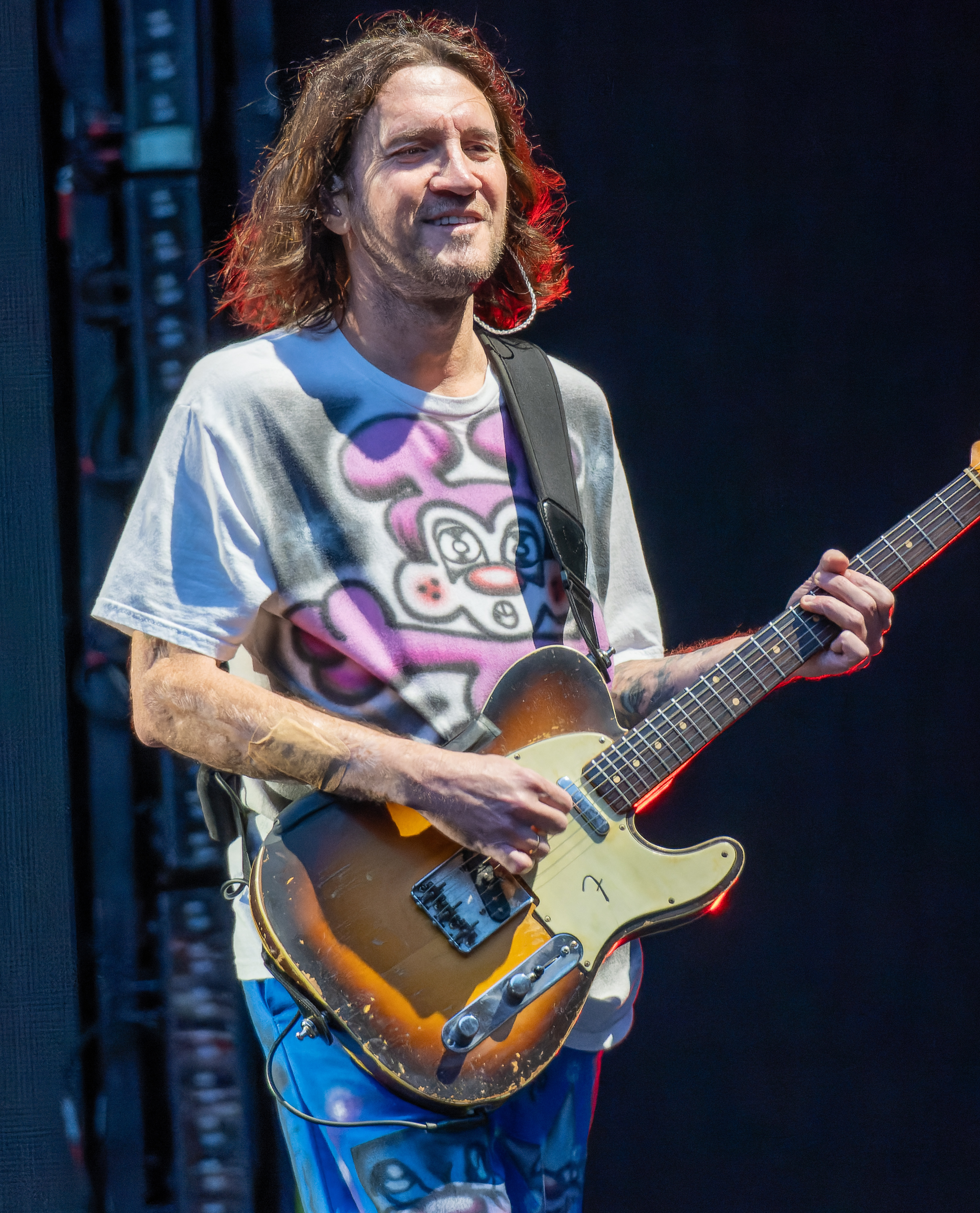
- Frusciante performing in 2023

Background information
- Also known as: Trickfinger
- Born: John Anthony Frusciante; March 5, 1970 (age 56); New York City, U.S.
- Genres: Alternative rock; funk rock; electronic; experimental; psychedelia
- Occupations: Musician; singer; songwriter
- Instruments: Guitar; vocals; keyboards; synthesizers
- Works: Discography
- Years active: 1988–present
- Labels: Warner; Record Collection; Birdman; American; Neurotic Yell; Acid Test; Evar Records
- Member of: Red Hot Chili Peppers: The Mars Volta (honorary)
- Formerly of: Ataxia
- Website: johnfrusciante.com

John Anthony Frusciante (/fruːˈʃɑːnteɪ/ froo-SHAHN-tay; born March 5, 1970) is an American musician who is the guitarist of the Red Hot Chili Peppers across three stints. He has released over a dozen solo albums and 9 EPs, ranging in style from acoustic guitar to electronic music. He was inducted into the Rock and Roll Hall of Fame as a member of the Red Hot Chili Peppers in 2012. Rolling Stone named Frusciante among the greatest guitarists of all time.

Frusciante joined the Chili Peppers at the age of 18 after the death of the guitarist Hillel Slovak, and first appeared on their album Mother's Milk (1989). His second album with the band, Blood Sugar Sex Magik (1991), was their breakthrough success. Overwhelmed by the popularity, he quit in 1992. He became a recluse and entered a period of heroin addiction, during which he released his first solo recordings: Niandra LaDes and Usually Just a T-Shirt (1994) and Smile from the Streets You Hold (1997). In 1998, he completed drug rehabilitation and rejoined the Chili Peppers, taking them to major success with their albums Californication (1999), By the Way (2002) and Stadium Arcadium (2006). Frusciante left the Chili Peppers again in 2009 and rejoined them in 2019, recording the albums Unlimited Love (2022) and Return of the Dream Canteen (2022).

Frusciante's solo work encompasses genres including experimental rock, ambient music, and electronica. He released six albums in 2004, each exploring different genres and recording techniques. In 2009, Frusciante released The Empyrean, which features members of the Chili Peppers. Frusciante also releases acid house under the alias Trickfinger. With the ex-Chili Peppers guitarist Josh Klinghoffer and Joe Lally, Frusciante has released two albums as Ataxia.

== Early life and education ==
John Anthony Frusciante was born in Queens, New York City on March 5, 1970. His father, John Augustus Frusciante, is a Juilliard-trained pianist, who later became a lawyer and then circuit court judge in Florida. His mother, Gail Bruno, was a promising vocalist who gave up her career to be a stay-at-home mother. Frusciante is of Italian ancestry; his great-grandfather, Generoso Frusciante, was originally from Benevento.

Frusciante's family moved to Tucson, Arizona, and then Florida, where his father served as a Broward County judge until October 2010. His parents separated when he was seven years old, and he and his mother moved to Santa Monica, California.

A year later, Frusciante and his mother moved to Mar Vista, Los Angeles, with his new stepfather, whom he says, "really supported me and made me feel good about being an artist." He became involved in the Los Angeles punk rock scene. At age nine, he became fixated on the Germs, repeatedly listening to their album (GI). He later used a non-standard tuning of his own invention to play songs from the album single-finger barre.

Frusciante began studying guitarists such as Jeff Beck, Jimmy Page, and Jimi Hendrix at 11. He discovered Frank Zappa, whose work he would study for hours. He dropped out of high school at age 16 with the permission of his parents and upon completion of a proficiency test. With their support, he moved to Los Angeles to develop his musicianship. He began taking classes at the Guitar Institute of Technology, but turned to punching in without actually attending and left shortly thereafter.

== Career ==
=== 1988–1992: First term with the Red Hot Chili Peppers ===
Frusciante discovered the Red Hot Chili Peppers around 1984 when his guitar instructor was auditioning as a guitarist for them. Frusciante attended a Red Hot Chili Peppers performance at age 15 and rapidly became a devoted fan. He idolized their guitarist, Hillel Slovak, familiarizing himself with virtually all the guitar and bass parts from the Red Hot Chili Peppers' first few records. He became acquainted with Slovak, and the two spoke months before Slovak's death. Frusciante told him he would not like the band if they became popular enough to play the Forum, Inglewood, and preferred smaller audiences.

Frusciante became friends with the former Dead Kennedys drummer D. H. Peligro in early 1988. They jammed together, and Peligro invited his friend, the Red Hot Chili Peppers' bassist Flea. Frusciante and Flea had an immediate musical chemistry. Around the same time, Frusciante intended to audition for Frank Zappa, but changed his mind as Zappa strictly prohibited illegal drug use. Frusciante said, "I realized that I wanted to be a rock star, do drugs and get girls, and that I wouldn't be able to do that if I was in Zappa's band."

Slovak died of a heroin overdose in 1988. Devastated, the Red Hot Chili Peppers drummer, Jack Irons, left the group. The remaining members, Flea and the vocalist, Anthony Kiedis, recruited Peligro on drums and DeWayne "Blackbyrd" McKnight, formerly of Parliament-Funkadelic, on guitar. However, McKnight failed to connect musically with the group. Flea proposed auditioning Frusciante, whose intimate knowledge of the Red Hot Chili Peppers' repertoire impressed him. Flea and Kiedis auditioned him and agreed that he would be a suitable replacement for McKnight. When Flea called Frusciante with the news of his acceptance, Frusciante ran through his house screaming with joy and jumped on a wall, leaving permanent boot marks. He turned down a contract with Thelonious Monster, with whom he had been playing for two weeks, to accept the Chili Peppers offer.

Frusciante was not familiar with the funk genre of Red Hot Chili Peppers' sound, saying, "I wasn't really a funk player before I joined the band. I learned everything I needed to know about how to sound good with Flea by studying Hillel's playing and I just took it sideways from there." Several weeks after Frusciante joined, Peligro, whose performance was suffering due to extreme drug abuse, was fired. Chad Smith was recruited as the drummer and the new lineup began recording their first album, Mother's Milk (1989). Frusciante focused on emulating Slovak's style. The producer, Michael Beinhorn, disagreed with this approach and wanted Frusciante to play with an uncharacteristic heavy metal tone, largely absent from the band's three preceding records. Frusciante and Beinhorn frequently fought over guitar tone and layering; Beinhorn prevailed, as Frusciante felt pressured by his knowledge of the studio. Kiedis recalled that "[Beinhorn] wanted John to have a big, crunching, almost metal-sounding guitar tone whereas before we always had some interesting acid-rock guitar tones as well as a lot of slinky, sexy, funky guitar tones".

The Chili Peppers collaborated with producer Rick Rubin for their second record with Frusciante, Blood Sugar Sex Magik (1991). Rubin felt that it was important to record the album in an unorthodox setting and suggested an old Hollywood Hills mansion. Frusciante, Kiedis and Flea isolated themselves there for the duration of the recording. Frusciante and Flea seldom went outside and spent most of their time smoking marijuana. Around this time, Frusciante began a side project with Flea and the Jane's Addiction drummer Stephen Perkins, the Three Amoebas. They recorded roughly 10 to 15 hours of material, which went unreleased.

=== 1992: First departure from the Chili Peppers ===
Blood Sugar Sex Magik reached number three on the Billboard charts and went on to sell 13 million copies worldwide. The unexpected success turned the Red Hot Chili Peppers into rock stars. Frusciante was blindsided by his newfound fame and struggled to cope. Soon after the album's release, he began to develop a dislike for the band's popularity. He and Kiedis argued after concerts: "John would say, 'We're too popular. I don't need to be at this level of success. I would just be proud to be playing this music in clubs like you guys were doing two years ago.'" Frusciante later said that the band's rise to popularity was "too high, too far, too soon. Everything seemed to be happening at once and I just couldn't cope with it."

Frusciante also began to feel that destiny was leading him away from the band. When the Red Hot Chili Peppers began their world tour, he started to hear voices in his head telling him "you won't make it during the tour, you have to go now". Frusciante said he had once taken pleasure in hedonism; however, "by the age of 20, I started doing it right and looking at it as an artistic expression instead of a way of partying and screwing a bunch of girls. To balance it out, I had to be extra-humble, extra-anti-rock star." He refused to take the stage during a performance at Saitama Sonic City on May 7, 1992, telling his bandmates that he was leaving the band. He was persuaded to perform but left for California the next morning. "It was just impossible for me to stay in the band any longer," he said. "It had come to the point where even though they wanted me in the band, it felt like I was forced out of the band. Not by any members in particular or management in particular, but just the direction it was going." He was replaced by the former Jane's Addiction guitarist Dave Navarro.

In a 2015 interview, Cris Kirkwood said that following Frusciante's departure from the band in 1992, Frusciante auditioned for the Meat Puppets. Kirkwood said, "He showed up with his guitar out of its case and barefoot. We were on a major label then, we just got signed, and those guys had blown up to where they were at and John needed to get out. John gets to our pad and we started getting ready to play and I said, 'You want to use my tuner?' He said, 'No, I'll bend it in.' It was so far out. Then we jammed but it didn't come to anything. Maybe he wasn't in the right place and we were a tight little unit. It just didn't quite happen but it could have worked."

=== 1992–1997: Addiction and first solo albums ===
Frusciante had developed serious drug habits while touring with the Chili Peppers; he said that when he "found out that Flea was stoned out of his mind at every show, that inspired me to be a pothead". He used heroin and was on the verge of full-scale addiction. Upon returning to California in 1992, Frusciante entered a deep depression, feeling that his life was over and that he could no longer write music or play the guitar. He spent the next three years in his Hollywood Hills home, the walls of which were badly damaged and covered in graffiti. During this time, his friends Johnny Depp and Gibby Haynes went to his house and filmed a documentary short, Stuff, depicting the squalor in which he was living. The house was eventually destroyed by a fire that also destroyed Frusciante's vintage guitar collection and several recordings.

Frusciante focused on painting, producing 4-track recordings he had made while working on Blood Sugar Sex Magik and writing short stories and screenplays. To cope with his worsening depression, Frusciante increased his heroin use and spiraled into a life-threatening dependency. His use of heroin to medicate his depression was a clear decision: "I was very sad, and I was always happy when I was on drugs; therefore, I should be on drugs all the time. I was never guilty—I was always really proud to be an addict."

"Your Pussy's Glued to a Building on Fire"
Sample of "Your Pussy's Glued to a Building on Fire", from Frusciante's first solo album, Niandra LaDes and Usually Just a T-Shirt

In 1993, Frusciante briefly performed with the band P, alongside Depp, the Butthole Surfers frontman Gibby Haynes, the actor Sal Jenco, and the songwriter Bill Carter. The band often played gigs at the Viper Room, including a performance with Flea on October 30, 1993. According to Gibby Haynes, the band was performing their song "Michael Stipe" when outside the venue River Phoenix was having seizures on the sidewalk. Phoenix died in the early hours of October 31 of heart failure, brought on by an overdose of cocaine and heroin at the age of 23. In his book Running with Monsters Bob Forrest wrote that River Phoenix and Frusciante spent the days preceding Phoenix's death together on a drug binge, consuming cocaine and heroin without sleeping for days.

Frusciante released his first solo album, Niandra LaDes and Usually Just a T-Shirt, in 1994. Frusciante denied that it was recorded while he was on heroin, saying it was released when he was a heroin addict. The album is an avant-garde composition whose initial purpose was a spiritual and emotional expression: "I wrote [the record] because I was in a really big place in my head—it was a huge, spiritual place telling me what to do. As long as I'm obeying those forces, it's always going to be meaningful. I could be playing guitar and I could say 'Play something that sucks,' and if I'm in that place, it's gonna be great. And it has nothing to do with me, except in ways that can't be understood." Niandra LaDes and Usually Just a T-Shirt was released on Rick Rubin's label American Recordings. Warner Bros., the Red Hot Chili Peppers' label, owned rights to the album because of the leaving-artist clause in Frusciante's band contract. However, because he was reclusive, the label handed the rights over to Rubin, who released the album at the urging of Frusciante's friends.

A 1996 article in the New Times LA described Frusciante as "a skeleton covered in thin skin" at the nadir of his addictions and nearly died from a blood infection. His arms were fiercely scarred from improperly shooting heroin and cocaine, causing large abscesses. Frusciante released his second solo album, Smile from the Streets You Hold, in 1997. The album's first track, "Enter a Uh", is characterized by cryptic lyrics and hysterical screeches. Frusciante also coughs throughout the track, showcasing his deteriorating health. The album features Phoenix on "Height Down". Frusciante said he released the album to get "drug money" and withdrew it from the market in 1999.

=== 1998–2002: Rehabilitation and return to the Chili Peppers ===
In late 1996, after more than five years of addiction to heroin, Frusciante went cold turkey. However, months later, he was unable to break addictions to crack cocaine and alcohol. In January 1998, urged by his longtime friend Bob Forrest, Frusciante checked into Las Encinas, a drug rehabilitation clinic in Pasadena. He was diagnosed with a potentially lethal oral infection, which could only be alleviated by removing his rotten teeth and replacing them with dental implants. He also received skin grafts to help repair the abscesses on his ravaged arms. About a month later, Frusciante checked out of Las Encinas.

Frusciante began living a more spiritual, ascetic lifestyle. He changed his diet, becoming more health-conscious, and began eating mostly unprocessed foods. Through regular practice of vipassana and yoga, he discovered the effect that self-discipline has on the body. To maintain his increased spiritual awareness and reduce distraction from his music, Frusciante decided to abstain from sexual activity, stating, "I'm very well without it." His attitude toward drug use changed, saying:

I don't need to take drugs. I feel so much more high all the time right now because of the type of momentum that a person can get going when you really dedicate yourself to something that you really love. I don't even consider doing them, they're completely silly. Between my dedication to trying to constantly be a better musician and eating my health foods and doing yoga, I feel so much more high than I did for the last few years of doing drugs. At this point I'm the happiest person in the world. These things do not fuck with me at all, and I'm so proud of that—you don't know how proud I am. It's such a beautiful thing to be able to face life, to face yourself, without hiding behind drugs; without having to have anger towards people who love you. There are people who are scared of losing stuff, but you don't lose anything for any other reason than if you just give up on yourself.

Despite his experience with addiction, Frusciante does not view his drug use as a "dark period". He considers it a period of rebirth, during which he found himself and cleared his mind. Frusciante has since stopped practicing yoga due to its effects on his back, but he still tries to meditate daily.

In early 1998, the Red Hot Chili Peppers fired Navarro and were on the verge of breaking up. Flea told Kiedis, "The only way I could imagine carrying on is if we got John back in the band." With Frusciante free of his addictions and ailments, Kiedis and Flea thought it was an appropriate time to invite him back. When Flea visited him at his home and asked him to rejoin the band, Frusciante began sobbing and said "nothing would make me happier in the world". The group began recording their seventh album, Californication, released in 1999. Frusciante's return restored a key component of the band's sound, as well as a healthy morale. He brought with him his deep devotion to music, which affected the band's recording style during the album. Frusciante has frequently said that his work on Californication was his favorite.

During the Californication world tour, Frusciante continued to compose material, much of which would be released in 2001 on his third solo album To Record Only Water for Ten Days. The album was stylistically unlike his previous records, less markedly stream-of-consciousness or avant-garde. However, the lyrics were still very cryptic and its sound was notably stripped down. The songwriting and production of To Record Only Water for Ten Days were more efficient and straightforward than on his previous recordings. The album strayed from the alternative rock he had just written with the Red Hot Chili Peppers on Californication, focusing more on electronic and new wave elements. In addition to his guitar work, Frusciante experimented with a variety of synthesizers, a distinctive feature of the record.

In 2001, Frusciante began recording his fourth album with Red Hot Chili Peppers, By the Way (2002); he considered the time to be among the happiest in his life. He relished the chance the album gave him to "keep writing better songs". While working on By the Way, he also composed most of what would become Shadows Collide with People, as well as the songs created for the film The Brown Bunny. His goal to improve his guitar playing on the album was largely driven by a desire to emulate guitar players such as Johnny Marr, John McGeoch and Andy Partridge. He wanted to listen to these musicians "who weren't just about technique but more about textures", or as he put it, "people who used good chords". The album marked Frusciante's shift to a more group-minded mentality within the Red Hot Chili Peppers, viewing the band as a cohesive unit rather than as four separate entities.

=== 2002–2007: The Mars Volta, 2004 recordings and Stadium Arcadium ===
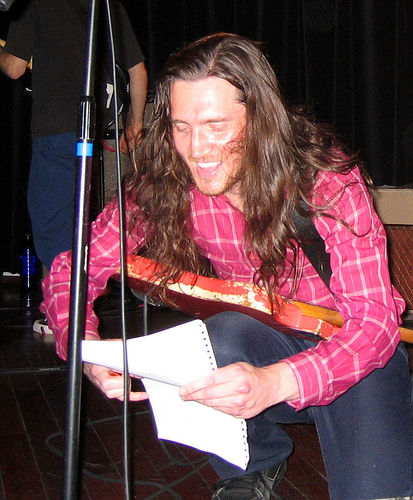
Frusciante in 2004

Frusciante wrote and recorded a plethora of songs during and after the By the Way tour. In February 2004, he started a side project with Joe Lally of Fugazi and future Chili Peppers guitarist Josh Klinghoffer, called Ataxia. The group was together for about two weeks, during which they recorded about ninety minutes of material. After two days in the recording studio, they played two shows at the Knitting Factory in New York City, and spent two more days in the studio before disbanding. Later that year, five songs provided by Frusciante appeared on The Brown Bunny soundtrack.

"The Past Recedes"
"The Past Recedes", from Frusciante's 2005 album Curtains, is a return to musical convention from the experimental ideas of his first recordings, Niandra LaDes and Usually Just a T-Shirt and Smile from the Streets You Hold.

Frusciante released his fourth full-length solo album Shadows Collide with People on February 24, 2004. This featured guest appearances from some of his friends, including Klinghoffer, and bandmates Smith and Flea. In June 2004, he announced that he would be releasing six records over six months: The Will to Death, Ataxia's Automatic Writing, DC EP, Inside of Emptiness, A Sphere in the Heart of Silence and Curtains. With the release of Curtains, Frusciante debuted his only music video of 2004, for the track "The Past Recedes". He wanted to produce these records quickly and inexpensively on analog tape, avoiding modern studio and computer-assisted recording processes. Frusciante noted, "These six records were recorded in a period of six months after coming home from touring with the Chili Peppers for one-and-a-half years. I made a list of all the songs I had and they totaled about seventy. My objective was to record as many songs as I could during the break that I had. In the midst of doing that, I was writing some of my best songs, so some of these albums have as many new songs as old songs. It was definitely the most productive time of my life."

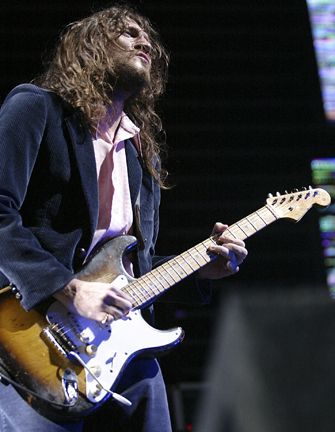
Frusciante with the Red Hot Chili Peppers in 2006

In early 2005, Frusciante entered the studio to work on his fifth studio album with the Red Hot Chili Peppers, Stadium Arcadium. His guitar playing is dominant throughout the album, and he provides backing vocals on most of the tracks. Although usually following a "less is more" style of guitar playing, he began using a full twenty-four track mixer for maximum effect. In the arrangements, he incorporates a wide array of sounds and playing styles, similar to the funk-influenced Blood Sugar Sex Magik or the more melodic By the Way. He also changed his approach to his playing, opting to contribute solos and let songs form from jam sessions. In an interview from Guitar World, Frusciante explained how he approached his guitar solos for their album Stadium Arcadium completely differently from those for their previous albums. On Blood Sugar Sex Magik and Californication, Frusciante had a general idea how he wanted his guitar solos to sound. For Stadium Arcadium, almost every guitar solo was completely improvised by Frusciante on the spot. Several reviews have stressed that the influence of Hendrix is evident in his solos on the album, with Frusciante himself backing this up. He also expanded the use of guitar effects throughout the album, and used various other instruments such as the synthesizer and mellotron. He worked continuously with Rubin over-dubbing guitar progressions, changing harmonies and using all his technical resources.

Frusciante began a series of collaborations with friend Omar Rodríguez-López and his band the Mars Volta, by contributing guitar and electronic instrumentation to song "Cicatriz ESP" off their album De-Loused in the Comatorium. He also contributed guitar solos on their 2005 album Frances the Mute. In 2006, he played guitar on seven of the eight tracks on The Mars Volta's "Amputechture". In return, Rodríguez-López has played on several of Frusciante's solo albums, as well as making a guest appearance on Stadium Arcadium.

=== 2007–2009: Second departure from the Chili Peppers and The Empyrean ===
Ataxia released its second and final studio album, AW II in 2007. Following the Stadium Arcadium tour (early May 2006 to late August 2007), the Red Hot Chili Peppers agreed to a hiatus of indefinite length. In early 2008, Anthony Kiedis finally confirmed this, citing exhaustion from constant work since Californication as the main reason. Frusciante quit the group on July 29, 2009, but did not publicly announce his departure until December 2009, two months after the band ended their hiatus in October 2009 and began work on their next album with Josh Klinghoffer as their new guitarist.

Frusciante's eighth solo album, The Empyrean, was released on January 20, 2009, through Record Collection. The record—a concept album—was in production between December 2006 and March 2008. The Empyrean features an array of musicians including Frusciante's Chili Peppers bandmate Flea, friends Josh Klinghoffer and former Smiths guitarist Johnny Marr, as well as guest musicians including Sonus Quartet and New Dimension Singers. Frusciante stated: "I'm really happy with [the record] and I've listened to it a lot for the psychedelic experience it provides," suggesting the album is "to be played as loud as possible and is suited to dark living rooms late at night."

=== 2010–2019: Electronic music ===
After leaving the Red Hot Chili Peppers, Frusciante focused on making electronic music. He learned to program instruments associated with acid house, and wrote on his blog: "My skills at making rock music [were] playing no part in it whatsoever. I had lost interest in traditional songwriting and I was excited about finding new methods for creating music." During this time, Frusciante founded an electronic trio with Aaron Funk and Chris McDonald under the name Speed Dealer Moms. Their first EP was released in December 2010 on Planet Mu Records.

Frusciante released an EP, Letur-Lefr, on July 17, 2012. As with his previous solo releases, it was released through Record Collection Music. It marked a departure from the guitar-driven sound of Frusciante's previous albums, with elements of abstract electronica, pop and hip-hop. On September 25, 2012, Frusciante released his ninth studio album, PBX Funicular Intaglio Zone. Frusciante released an instrumental, "Wayne", on April 7, 2013, through his website. It was written and dedicated to the memory of his late friend, the Red Hot Chili Peppers' tour chef Wayne Forman.

Outsides, Frusciante's fifth EP, was released in August 2013. That year, he produced and featured on an album by the hip-hop group Black Knights. Medieval Chamber, released on January 14, 2014. Frusciante also became involved in Kimono Kult, a project including his wife Nicole Turley, Omar Rodríguez-López, Teri Gender Bender (Le Butcherettes, Bosnian Rainbows), string musician Laena Geronimo (Raw Geronimo) and guitarist Dante White (Dante Vs. Zombies, Starlite Desperation). Their debut EP, Hiding in the Light was produced by Turley and was released on her record label Neurotic Yell in March 2014. A track "Todo Menos El Dolor" was released on SoundCloud on January 16. Having released "Scratch", a single recorded during the PBX Funicular Intaglio Zone sessions, Frusciante released his tenth studio album, Enclosure, on April 8, 2014. In April 2015, Frusciante released his first album under the alias of Trickfinger. The album of the same name is Frusciante's first experimenting with the acid house genre. He previously released an EP, Sect In Sgt under this alias in 2012. On April 16, 2016, Frusciante would release the EP Foregrow. It was released on Record Store Day and comprised the title track, recorded for RZA's film The Man with the Iron Fists, and three instrumental tracks.

On November 24, 2015, Frusciante announced that he was releasing free unreleased songs dating from 2008 to 2013 on his official Bandcamp and SoundCloud pages. He also debunked the interview about him retiring from the music industry, saying that his words were taken out of context. The announcement was made via Frusciante's rarely updated website in an open letter titled "Hello audience," where Frusciante provides an in-depth response to the website that, according to him, took his words out of context. He writes, "I also must clear something up. I normally don't read my press, but I heard about this quote, recently taken out of context by some lame website and made into a headline, in which I said 'I have no audience'. This has been misinterpreted, and by no fault of the excellent journalist who interviewed me for the fine publication Electronic Beats. ... Obviously I have a public audience. I am aware of them, and they know who they are." He continues, "Reduced to a single sentence, it would have been accurate to say that, at this point, I have no particular audience in mind while I am making music." On September 8, 2017, Frusciante, under the alias of Trickfinger, released his second studio album Trickfinger II on the label Acid Test.

=== 2019–present: third tenure with the Chili Peppers ===
On December 15, 2019, the Red Hot Chili Peppers announced that Frusciante had rejoined, replacing Klinghoffer. They had been working on a new album with Klinghoffer, but had made little progress. Frusciante said: "Flea had put the idea [of rejoining] in my head and I was sitting there with the guitar thinking that I hadn't written any rock music in so long. Could I still do that?" His approach towards the Red Hot Chili Peppers and how he perceived himself within it had also changed from his last tenure with the band: "If I just try to let them be themselves, rather than making my own visions the center of everything. It felt like if somehow any of us died leaving it the way it was, it would be terrible." In an interview, Klinghoffer said there was no animosity around his exit: "It's absolutely John's place to be in that band ... I'm happy that he's back with them." Flea said that "artistically, in terms of being able to speak the same [musical] language, it was easier working with John".

On February 8, 2020, Frusciante performed with the Chili Peppers for the first time in 13 years at a memorial service held by the Tony Hawk Foundation for late film producer Andrew Burkle, son of billionaire Ronald Burkle. Frusciante said he had found it exciting to play guitar again after having focused on electronic music in his solo work for several years. Unlimited Love, the Red Hot Chili Peppers' twelfth studio album and their first with Frusciante in sixteen years, was released on April 1, 2022. On June 4, the Red Hot Chili Peppers began an international stadium tour. On October 14, 2022, the Chili Peppers released their thirteenth studio album, Return of the Dream Canteen, which was recorded during the same sessions as Unlimited Love.

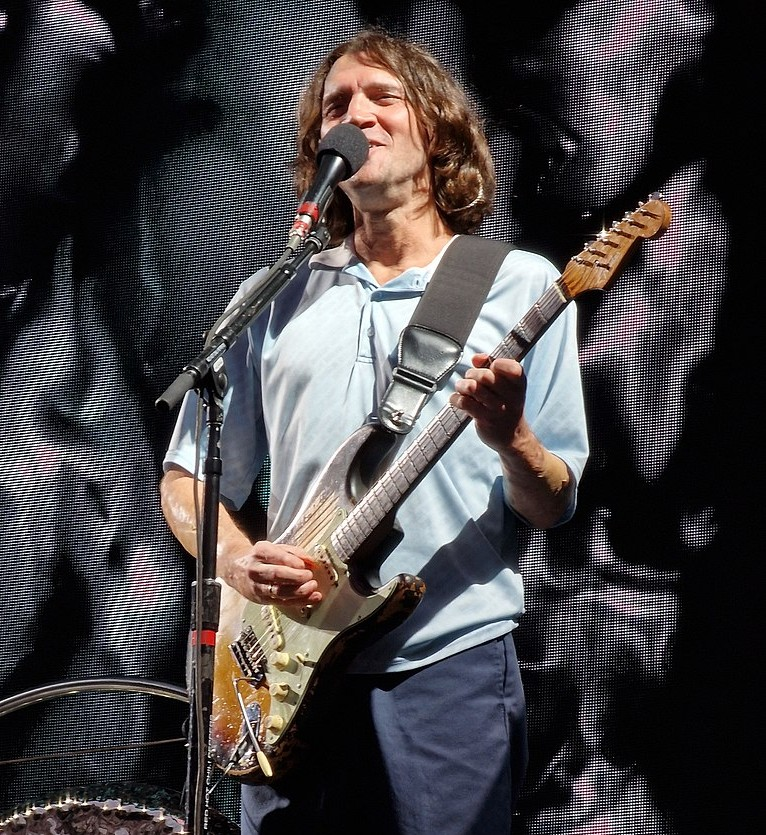
Frusciante performing with Red Hot Chili Peppers in 2022

In 2020, Frusciante released the EPs Look Down, See Us and She Smiles Because She Presses the Button under his electronic alias Trickfinger and the instrumental electronic album Maya under his real name. He said he had become less interested in singing and writing lyrics, and that he enjoyed "the back and forth with machines and the computer". Frusciante and Flea contributed a cover of "Not Great Men" to a 2021 tribute album to Gang of Four, The Problem of Leisure: A Celebration of Andy Gill and Gang of Four. Frusciante released two versions—one mastered for vinyl and the other for CD and other streaming services—of an ambient solo record, I and II, on February 3, 2023, stating, "after a year and a half of writing and recording rock music, I needed to clear my head".

As of February 2026, the Chili Peppers are currently in the writing process for their fourteenth studio album. "We've been writing music together, recording at John Frusciante's house, and the music feels great. Ultimately, once we start playing, it's about… just catching a magic groove and doing it good" Flea said.

On May 19, 2026, Frusciante announced through bandcamp that he will release In a Box, a twenty-five song, four album box set that will be released on July 10, 2026 on the Acid Test label under his alias Trickfinger. The box set will celebrate the tenth anniversary of Trickfinger and Trickfinger II which will both be reissued on green and red vinyl along with two new albums titled High Low and Rotation. Six of the eight songs on High Low were previously released in 2015 as a internet album known as Renoise Tracks 2009-2011.

=== Collaborations with Omar Rodríguez-López ===
Frusciante played guitar on five Mars Volta studio albums, as well as Rodríguez-López's solo albums Se Dice Bisonte, No Búfalo and Calibration (Is Pushing Luck and Key Too Far). He also functioned as executive producer for Rodríguez-López's directorial film debut, The Sentimental Engine Slayer. The film debuted at the Rotterdam Film Festival in February 2010. Along with work on the film, Frusciante and Rodríguez-López have released two collaborative records in May 2010. The first is the album Omar Rodriguez Lopez & John Frusciante, an album with just the two of them, the other a quartet record, Sepulcros de Miel, consisting of Rodríguez-López, Frusciante, Juan Alderete and Marcel Rodríguez-López.

In a 2012 interview with Blare Magazine, when asked about possible future collaborations with Frusciante, Omar Rodríguez-López said: "Maybe in the future, but John's in a different place right now. He's in a place where he couldn't care less about putting things out or about something being a product. He's living by different standards right now with a different philosophy, so he doesn't want to be a part of anything that he knows is going to end up being a product. A Mars Volta record definitely ends up being a product."

== Artistry and legacy ==
When the intellectual part of guitar playing overrides the spiritual, you don't get to extreme heights.

— John Frusciante (Rolling Stone, February 2007)

Frusciante's musical style has evolved over his career. Although he received moderate recognition for his early guitar work, it was not until later in his career that music critics and guitarists alike began to fully recognize it. Frusciante attributes this recognition to his shift in focus, stating that he chose an approach based on rhythmic patterns inspired by the complexity of material Jimi Hendrix and Eddie Van Halen produced. On earlier records, he was influenced by various underground punk and new wave musicians. Rolling Stone named him the 18th-greatest guitarist of all time in 2003, and the 25th-greatest guitarist of all time in 2023.

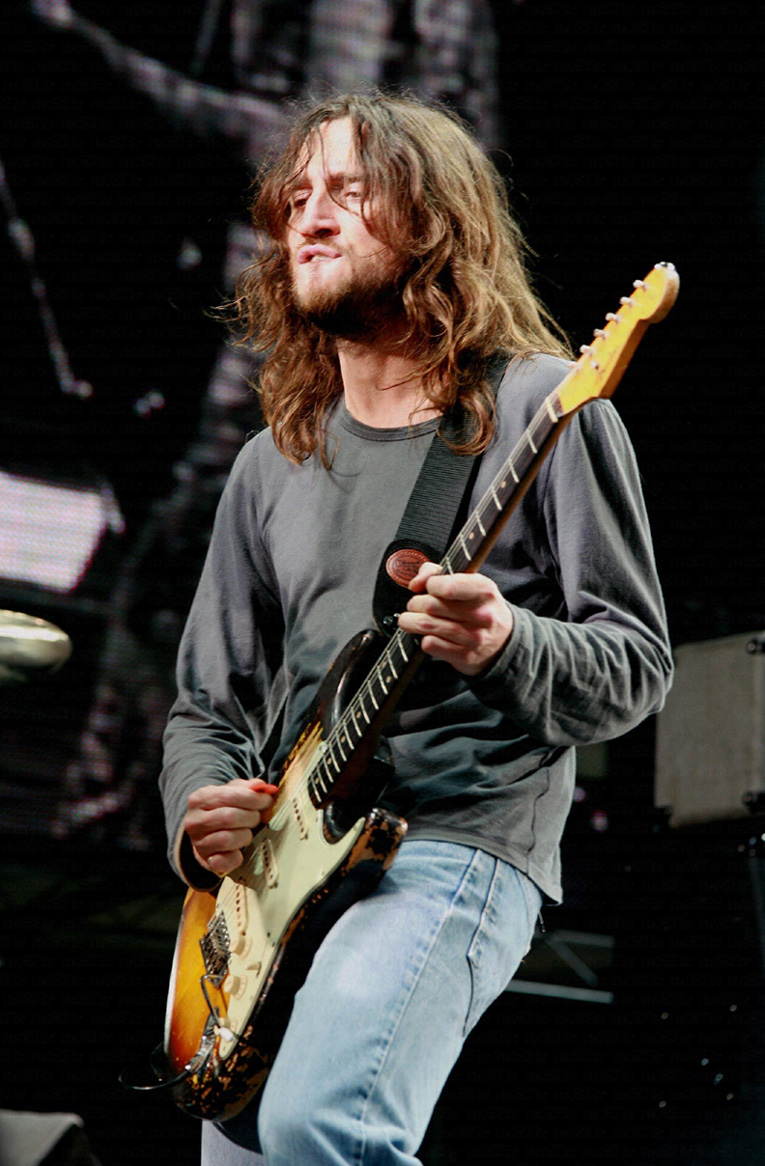
Frusciante playing his signature Fender Stratocaster

In general, his sound is also defined by an affinity for vintage guitars. All the guitars that he owns, records, and tours with were made before 1970. Frusciante uses the specific guitar that he finds appropriate for a certain song. All of the guitars he owned before quitting the band were destroyed when his house burned down in 1993. The first guitar he bought after rejoining the Chili Peppers was a 1962 red Fender Jaguar. His most-often used guitar, however, is a 1962 Sunburst Fender Stratocaster that was given to him as a gift from Anthony Kiedis after Frusciante rejoined the Chili Peppers in 1998. He has played this guitar on every album since rejoining the Chili Peppers, and their ensuing tours. He also owns a 1955 Fender Stratocaster, his only Strat with a maple fretboard. Frusciante's most highly appraised instrument is a 1955 Gretsch White Falcon, which he used twice per show for the songs "Californication" and "Otherside". In 2006 and 2007, he only used it for the latter song, saying there was "no room for it", preferring multiple Stratocasters for the Stadium Arcadium tour. Virtually all of Frusciante's acoustic work is played with a 1950s Martin 0–15.

With the Chili Peppers, Frusciante has always run a pair of Marshall amplifiers in tandem, a Silver Jubilee and a Major. He prefers using a guitar amp (the Jubilee) for "edge" and a bass amp (the Major) for "punch and low end." He runs both into their own pairs of Marshall 1960B 4x12 speaker cabinets with Celestion speakers. Frusciante has also played amps like the Fender Dual Showman and Bassman. For effects, Frusciante has used the Boss DS-1, DS-2 Turbo Distortion, and CE-1 Chorus Ensemble (used to split his guitar signal at the end of his signal chain); Electro-Harmonix Big Muff Pi and Holy Grail reverb; MXR Phase 90; and Ibanez WH-10 wah wah.

After leaving the Red Hot Chili Peppers, he switched to using a Yamaha SG as his primary guitar for his solo work. "With the Yamaha SG, I could play along with guitar players who were playing, say, Les Pauls, and feel like the sound matched what I was hearing on the record. ... People like Robert Fripp, Mick Ronson, Tony Iommi, and particularly John McGeoch from Siouxsie and the Banshees, who played a Yamaha SG, which is why I bought one in the first place". Frusciante has also noted his increased use of the Roland MC-202 for his electronic music, saying that he was at the point "where I thought as much like a 202ist as I did a guitarist." The MC-202 has been his primary melodic instrument in his electronic music.

With the Red Hot Chili Peppers, Frusciante provided backing vocals in a falsetto tenor, a style he started on Blood Sugar Sex Magik. He thoroughly enjoyed his role in the Chili Peppers as backing vocalist, and said that backing vocals are a "real art form". Despite his commitment to the Chili Peppers, he felt that his work with the band should remain separate from his solo projects. When he returned to the Chili Peppers in 1998, Kiedis wanted the band to record "Living in Hell", a song Frusciante had written several years before. Frusciante refused, feeling that the creative freedom he needed for his solo projects would have conflicted with his role in the band.

=== Technique ===
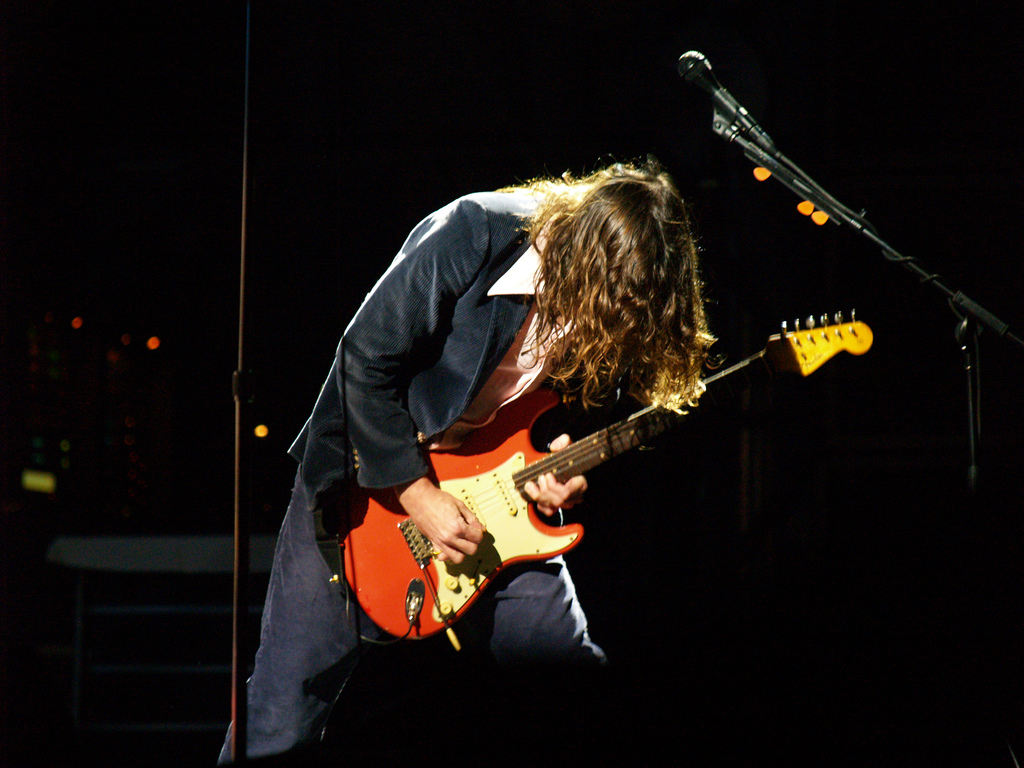
Frusciante with the Red Hot Chili Peppers in 2006

Frusciante's guitar playing employs emphasis on appropriate melody, tone, and structure rather than virtuosity. Although virtuoso influences can be heard throughout his career, he has said that he often minimizes technical ability. He believes that in general, guitar mastery has not evolved much since the 1960s and considers the greatest players of that decade unsurpassed. When Frusciante was growing up in the 1980s, many mainstream guitarists focused on playing with extreme speed, a trend he thinks led to neglect of other interesting guitar styles from punk rock and other genres. Therefore, he accentuates the melodically driven technique of players such as Matthew Ashman of Bow Wow Wow, and Bernard Sumner of Joy Division and New Order, as much as possible because he believes their style has been overlooked and consequently underexplored. Nonetheless, Frusciante considers himself a fan of technique-driven guitarists like Randy Rhoads and Steve Vai, but he also represses an urge to emulate their style: "People believe that by playing faster and creating new playing techniques you can progress forward, but then they realize that emotionally they don't progress at all. They transmit nothing to the people listening and they stay at where Hendrix was three decades ago. Something like that happened to Vai in the 80s." Believing that focusing only on "clean tones" is negative, Frusciante developed an interest in playing with what he calls a "grimy" sound. As a result, he considers it beneficial to "mistreat" his guitar and employ various forms of distortion when soloing. He also tries to break as many "stylistic boundaries" as he can to expand his musical horizons. He thinks much of the output from today's guitarists is unoriginal, stating many of his contemporaries "follow the rules with no risk."

Frusciante has stated that he became serious about creating and engineering his electronic music in 2007. As he became comfortable with electronic instruments and techniques, he also felt comfortable with how R&B and hip-hop integrated into his work. He has noted these and other new techniques were all influences on his EP, Letur-Lefr. PBX Funicular Intaglio Zone was recorded while Frusciante looked to find new ways to play the guitar with the new forms of music and production that he had been studying. In his now-deleted blog post, "My Recent History," he notes that "aspects of PBX are the realization of combinations of styles of music I saw in my head many years ago, as potentials, but which I had no idea how to execute."

Frusciante's approach to album composition has changed. On his early recordings he welcomed sonic imperfections, noting that "even on To Record Only Water for Ten Days there are off-pitch vocals and out-of-tune guitars." However, on later albums such as Shadows Collide With People, he pursued the opposite: "I just wanted everything to be perfect—I didn't want anything off pitch, or off time, or any unintentional this or that." Frusciante believes quality songwriting takes time, and he does not force it: "If a song wants to come to me, I'm always ready to receive it, but I don't work at it." Much of his solo material is first written on an acoustic or unamplified electric guitar. He also prefers to record his albums on analog tapes and other relatively primitive equipment. This preference stems from his belief that older equipment can speed up the recording process, and that modern computerized recording technology gives only an illusion of efficiency. Frusciante tries to streamline the recording process as much as possible because he thinks "music comes alive when [you] are creating it fast." He also enjoys the challenge of having to record something in very few takes, and believes that when musicians are unable to handle the pressure of having to record something quickly they often get frustrated or bogged down by perfectionism. With his focus on new styles of music, Frusciante describes working with the computer as an instrument finding the ability to merge old and new production techniques. In the past, Frusciante would work on one song of an album at a time, but he later felt much more comfortable to work within the album as a whole. He currently uses the music tracker Renoise as his main digital audio workstation along with some drum machines, sequencers, and other hardware, along with his Doepfer, Arp, and other modular synthesizers.

=== Influences ===
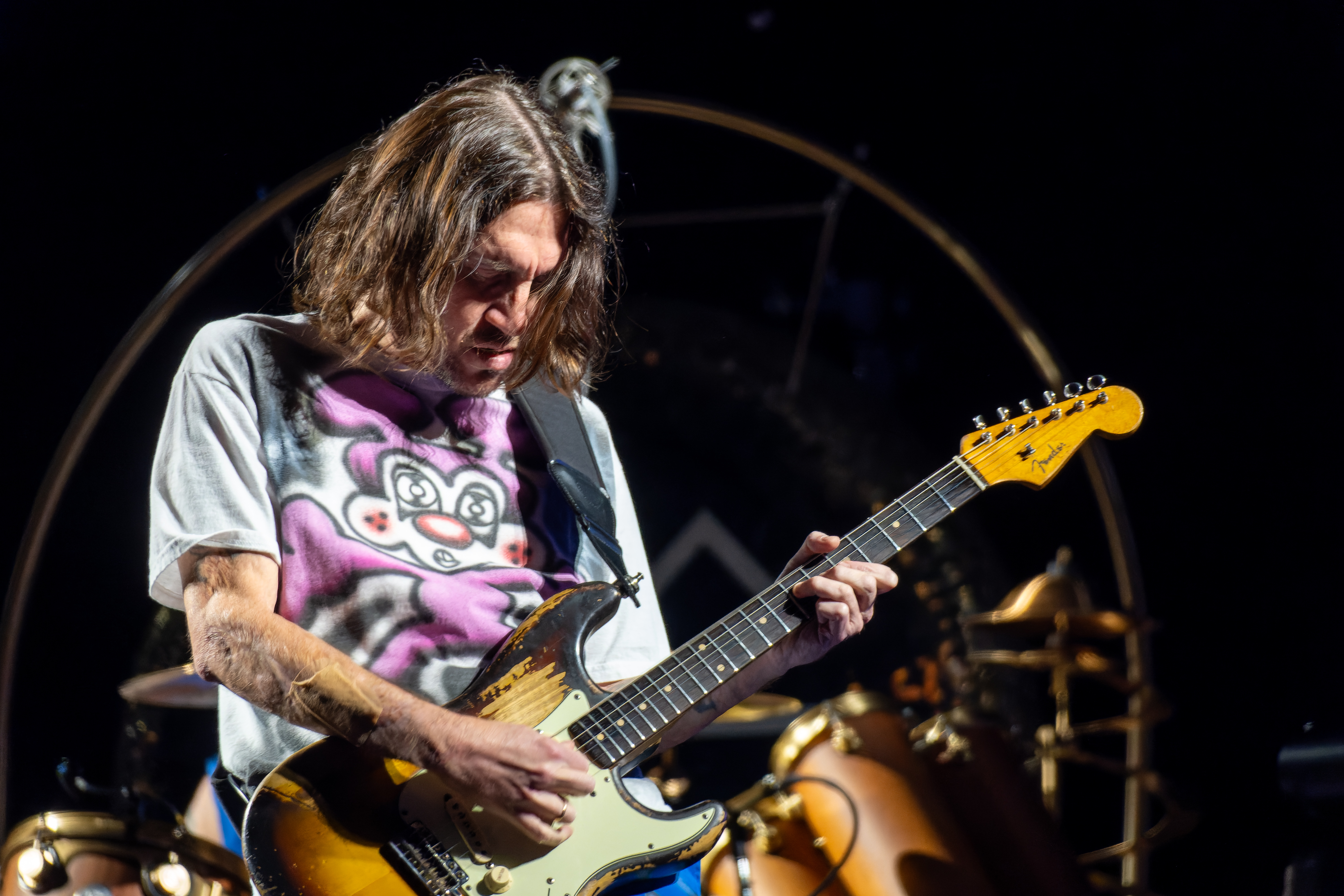
Frusciante performing with the Red Hot Chili Peppers in 2023

Frusciante's first major influence was Jimi Hendrix. He then saw the Red Hot Chili Peppers (at that point, The was part of their name) in concert in 1985, after which their then-guitarist Hillel Slovak became his second major influence, with Frusciante coming to idolize Slovak. Although Hendrix and Slovak were arguably Frusciante's most profound influences, he was also inspired by glam rock artists David Bowie, and T. Rex; as well as avant-garde acts such as Syd Barrett, Captain Beefheart, the Residents, the Velvet Underground, Neu!, Frank Zappa, and Kraftwerk. Frusciante has expressed his admiration of progressive rock acts like Genesis, King Crimson, and Yes. Frusciante wrote an essay for the Yes box set, The Word Is Live, released in 2005.

He credits his inspiration for learning guitar to Greg Ginn, Pat Smear, and Joe Strummer, amongst others. As an adolescent, he began by focusing upon Hendrix, as well as bands like Public Image Ltd., the Smiths, and XTC. Frusciante's other major influence was John McGeoch of Magazine and Siouxsie and the Banshees. "[McGeoch] is such a guitarist I aspire to be. He has a new brilliant idea for each song. I usually play on the stuff he does on Magazine's albums and Siouxsie & the Banshees's like Juju". Frusciante has mentioned Steve Howe as his favorite guitarist in his early teens; he was also impressed by B-52s guitarist, Ricky Wilson.

Frusciante has cited Matthew Ashman of Bow Wow Wow, and Bernard Sumner of Joy Division and New Order, as influential in multiple interviews. In a 2009 conversation with author David Todd, Frusciante said:

I like all kinds of guitar players, but it's people like [Ashman and Sumner] whose playing really amazes me, and it's because of their ideas, it's because of what they thought. It's because they approached the instrument differently than anybody else. It's people like Keith Levene from Public Image and Daniel Ash in Bauhaus who are exploring the possibilities of what you can do with the guitar, whereas other people seem like they're just exploring what you can physically do, and that serves no interest to me anymore.

During the recording of Blood Sugar Sex Magik, Captain Beefheart and the acoustic, one-man blues of Lead Belly and Robert Johnson, were among the most noteworthy influences. Frusciante cites R&B singer Brandy as a musical inspiration and admires her voice, calling it "multidimensional" and "inspiring." In describing her voice and signature sound, he said, "You can't hear [the elaborate harmonies] with your conscious; you have to hear her voice with your subconscious." He also mentioned that Brandy was the "main inspiration" behind the guitar work on Red Hot Chili Peppers' 2006 album, Stadium Arcadium.

On Californication and By the Way, Frusciante derived the technique of creating tonal texture through chord patterns from post-punk guitarists Vini Reilly of the Durutti Column and John McGeoch, and bands such as the Smiths, Fugazi and the Cure. He originally intended By the Way to be made up of "these punky, rough songs", drawing inspiration from early punk artists such as the Germs and The Damned. However, this was discouraged by producer Rick Rubin, and he instead built upon Californication's melodically-driven style. During the recording of Stadium Arcadium, he moved away from his new wave influences and concentrated on emulating flashier guitar players such as Jimi Hendrix and Eddie Van Halen.

Frusciante has cited the synth-pop bands Depeche Mode and Orchestral Manoeuvres in the Dark as influences. He used his guitar to emulate the synthesizer melodies of those acts, as well as those of Gary Numan and the Human League, during the making of By the Way. Frusciante explained, "I was finding that people who were programming synthesizers in this early electronic music were playing in a very minimal way, where every single note means something new and every note builds on what the last notes were doing." His other electronic influences include Peter Rehberg, Christian Fennesz, Ekkehard Ehlers, Autechre, DJ Funk, DJ Assault, DJ Deeon and DJ Rashad. In 2022, Frusciante said his favorite music genre was jungle.

Frusciante's interests are constantly changing, as he believes that without change he will no longer have any interest in playing: "I'm always drawing inspiration from different kinds of music and playing guitar along with records, and I go into each new album project with a preconceived idea of what styles I want to combine".

== Personal life ==
In 2022, Frusciante married DJ and producer Marcia Pinna, who goes by the name Aura T-09. In 2020, Pinna and Frusciante launched the record label Evar Records together. Frusciante is the godparent to Flea's daughter Sunny Bebop Balzary.

== Discography ==
As a solo artist

- Niandra LaDes and Usually Just a T-Shirt (1994)
- Smile from the Streets You Hold (1997)
- To Record Only Water for Ten Days (2001)
- Shadows Collide with People (2004)
- The Will to Death (2004)
- Inside of Emptiness (2004)
- Curtains (2005)
- The Empyrean (2009)
- PBX Funicular Intaglio Zone (2012)
- Enclosure (2014)
- Maya (2020)
- I and II (2023)

as Trickfinger

- Sect In Sgt EP (2012)
- Trickfinger (2015)
- Trickfinger II (2017)
- Look Down, See Us EP (2020)
- She Smiles Because She Presses the Button (2020)
- High Low (2026) (previously free digital download as Renoise Tracks 2009–2011 in 2015, re-released exclusively in In a Box 5LP boxset)
- Rotation (2026) (In a Box)

with Red Hot Chili Peppers

- Mother's Milk (1989)
- Blood Sugar Sex Magik (1991)
- Californication (1999)
- By the Way (2002)
- Stadium Arcadium (2006)
- Unlimited Love (2022)
- Return of the Dream Canteen (2022)

with The Mars Volta

- De-Loused in the Comatorium (2003)
- Frances the Mute (2005)
- Amputechture (2006)
- The Bedlam in Goliath (2008)
- Octahedron (2009)
- Lucro Sucio; Los Ojos del Vacio (2025) (Engineering)

with Ataxia

- Automatic Writing (2004)
- AW II (2007)

Collaborations

- A Sphere in the Heart of Silence (2004; with Josh Klinghoffer)
- Omar Rodriguez Lopez & John Frusciante (2010; with Omar Rodríguez-López)
- Sepulcros de Miel (2010; with Omar Rodríguez-López Quartet)
- Mahandini (2018; with Dewa Budjana featured on "Crowded" & "Zone")
- The Problem of Leisure: A Celebration of Andy Gill and Gang of Four (2021; with Flea on the track "Not Great Men")
- Honora (2026; with Flea on "Frailed" & "Willow Weep for Me")
