= Shadows Collide with People =

Studio album by John Frusciante
- Released: February 24, 2004
- Recorded: 2003
- Studio: Cello (Hollywood)
- Genre: Experimental rock, art rock, alternative rock
- Length: 62:23
- Label: Warner Bros.
- Producer: John Frusciante

John Frusciante chronology
From the Sounds Inside (2001)	Shadows Collide with People (2004)	The Brown Bunny (2004)

Professional ratings
Aggregate scores
Source	Rating
Metacritic	70/100
Review scores
Source	Rating
AllMusic	4/5 stars
Blender	3.5/5 stars
Entertainment Weekly	B
The Guardian	4/5 stars
Mojo	4.5/5 stars
Pitchfork	6.9/10
Rolling Stone	3/5 stars
Stylus Magazine	A−
Tiny Mix Tapes	3.5/5 stars
Uncut	3.5/5 stars

Shadows Collide with People is the fourth studio album by American musician John Frusciante, released February 24, 2004. The album was written during the recording of By the Way (2002) by Frusciante's group Red Hot Chili Peppers and is widely regarded as his most accessible work, featuring a mix of guitar-driven alternative rock, folk ballads, and electronica. Frusciante has stated that this was his most expensive solo album to date, costing around $150,000 to produce, a significant departure from his earlier albums, which had been low-budget and recorded at his home. Frusciante noted, "I was sick and tired of people dismissing my records as being fucked-up and unprofessional."

Flea plays a double bass on "The Slaughter", the closing track of the album. All songs were written by John Frusciante, except "Omission" and "-00Ghost27" which were co-written with Josh Klinghoffer who would later replace Frusciante in Red Hot Chili Peppers. Klinghoffer and Frusciante share the album credits for "Vocal, Guitar, Bass, Synthesizers, Keyboards & Percussion". Shadows Collide with People is the only Frusciante solo album to feature Red Hot Chili Peppers' drummer Chad Smith.

Frusciante also made acoustic and demo versions of these tracks available to fans through his official site as an alternative to the highly produced sound of the record. The demo tracks feature Josh Klinghoffer on drums. A promo version of the album was also made, with the tracks "Omission", "Song to Sing When I'm Lonely", and "Failure33Object".

The album reached number 191 on the Billboard 200 and #11 on Heatseekers.

On the vinyl release of the album the words "One step away" were inscribed on side A, "There's riddles in the shadows" on side B, "A hint of sadness" on side C, and '"What they least suspect is coming next" on side D. All of these were hints to lyrics on John's next solo album The Will to Death, specifically the songs "The Will to Death" (side A), "The Days Have Turned" (sides B and D), and "Loss" (side C).

== Track listing ==
All tracks are written by John Frusciante, unless otherwise noted.

No.	Title	Writer(s)	Length
1.	"Carvel"		6:15
2.	"Omission" (feat. Josh Klinghoffer)	Frusciante, Josh Klinghoffer	4:33
3.	"Regret"		2:58
4.	"Ricky"		3:59
5.	"Second Walk"		1:42
6.	"Every Person"		2:38
7.	"-00Ghost27"	Frusciante, Josh Klinghoffer	3:50
8.	"Wednesday's Song"		3:31
9.	"This Cold"		2:00
10.	"Failure33Object"		2:56
11.	"Song to Sing When I'm Lonely"		3:16
12.	"Time Goes Back"		3:23
13.	"In Relief"		3:36
14.	"Water"		4:06
15.	"Cut-Out"		3:34
16.	"Chances"		1:49
17.	"23 go in to End"		6:42
18.	"The Slaughter"		3:53
Total length:			64:41

Japanese release
No.	Title	Length
15.	"Of Before"	3:17
Total length:		67:58

Acoustic version
No.	Title	Writer(s)	Length
1.	"Carvel"		4:17
2.	"Omission"	Frusciante, Josh Klinghoffer	4:36
3.	"Regret"		2:50
4.	"Ricky"		3:44
5.	"Second Walk"		1:41
6.	"Every Person"		1:53
7.	"Wednesday's Song"		3:48
8.	"This Cold"		1:30
9.	"Song to Sing When I'm Lonely"		3:18
10.	"Time Goes Back"		3:23
11.	"In Relief"		3:27
12.	"Water"		3:07
13.	"Cut-Out"		3:32
14.	"Chances"		1:53
15.	"The Slaughter"		3:56
Total length:			43:35

Demo version
No.	Title	Writer(s)	Length
1.	"Omission"	Frusciante, Josh Klinghoffer	3:31
2.	"The Slaughter"		4:04
3.	"Ricky Nelson" (Original title of "Ricky")		3:51
4.	"Cut-Out"		3:26
5.	"In Relief"		2:28
6.	"Every Person"		2:04
7.	"Time Goes Back"		3:26
8.	"I Regret My Past" (Original title of "Regret")		3:01
9.	"Carvel"		4:15
Total length:			29:26

== Personnel ==
- John Frusciante – lead and backing vocals, acoustic and electric guitar, synthesizers, bass, piano, Mellotron, producer, art direction
- Josh Klinghoffer – lead vocals (on "Omission"), backing vocals, bass, electric guitar, synthesizers, keyboards, piano, mellotron, synare, vocoder, percussion, timpani
- Chad Smith – drums, percussion
- Flea – upright bass (on "The Slaughter")
- Omar Rodríguez-López – slide guitar (on "Chances", "23 Go in to end")
- Greg Kurstin – wurlitzer piano (on "Of Before")
- Charlie Clouser – orchestral programming (on "Regret" and "Chances")

Production

- Jim Scott – engineer, mixing
- Ryan Hewitt – engineer
- Dave Lee – equipment technician
- Ethan Mates – engineer
- Chris Holmes – assistant
- Chris Ohno – assistant
- Joe Mankin – assistant
- Alex Marshall – assistant
- Daniel Carlotta Jones – assistant
- Serena Deakin – assistant
- Bernie Grundman – mastering
- Rene Ricard – cover painting
- Vincent Gallo – photography
- Richard Scane Goodheart – design

== Charts ==
Chart (2004)	Peak position
Australia (ARIA Charts)	92
Belgium	80
Finland	28
France	127
Ireland	44
Netherlands	83
Switzerland	51
UK	53
US Billboard 200	191
