= Kathleen Sloan =

American musician

- Genres: Classical, Pop, Rock
- Instrument: Violin
- Member of: Sonus Quartet

Kathleen Sloan is an American violinist based in Los Angeles, CA and a member of the Sonus Quartet.

== Early life ==
Sloan grew up in a ranching family in Breckenridge, Texas. At 15, Sloan left home and enrolled in the Young Artist Program at the Cleveland Institute of Music, where she completed high school while beginning her Bachelor of Music at the Cleveland Institute of Music under the tutelage of David Cerone. She later graduated magna cum laude from the University of Southern California

== Career ==
Sloan was a member of the Houston Grand Opera and Houston Ballet Orchestra from 2004 to 2009, and joined the Los Angeles based Sonus Quartet in 2008. She also served as Concertmaster for the Abilene Philharmonic for two seasons.
