= Outsides (EP) =

EP by John Frusciante
- Released: August 27, 2013
- Recorded: 2012–2013
- Genre: Electronica, experimental rock, IDM, electronic rock, avant-garde
- Length: 19:13 (Standard release); 23:41 (Japanese release)
- Label: Record Collection
- Producer: John Frusciante

John Frusciante chronology
PBX Funicular Intaglio Zone (2012)	Outsides (2013)	Enclosure (2014)

Outsides is the fifth EP by John Frusciante, originally scheduled to be released on August 14, 2013, in Japan, and on August 27, 2013, internationally on Record Collection but due to an error in the distribution process, some pre-ordered CDs were shipped to customers during late July 2013. As a result, the international record release date has been brought forward to the 6th August 2013. The EP was released in multiple formats, including CD, vinyl, 32-bit digital formats and cassette. The music serves as a conceptual bridge between PBX Funicular Intaglio Zone and Enclosure.

== Background and recording ==
Frusciante commented on the release:

Outsides consists of a 10-minute guitar solo and 2 abstract “out” pieces of music. Here I use the word out in the same sense as the term was used in free jazz. It’s a modern approach to the concepts of harmony found in some late 50s/early 60s free jazz and some 20th century classical. I don’t employ any aspects of rock or pop harmony, and that was basically the approach, just to make music that is not reliant on the center that, on PBX, was provided by my songwriting style. I consider this to be working along abstract lines. Making forward moving, full sounding music without resorting to any familiar musical relationships of harmony to serve as a basis has been a goal of mine for quite a while. Both songs have my style of drums and guitar solos, but nevertheless I think of them as my version of modern classical music. They started as just orchestra, but I go wherever music takes me, and I use any instrument to express my feelings, just as I use aspects of any style. For instance, on "Shelf", despite the unconventional tonality of the section, I was surprised to find that a blues guitar solo worked well. Also, both songs have Acid sections.

Professional ratings
Aggregate scores
Source	Rating
Metacritic	62/100
Review scores
Source	Rating
AllMusic	3/5 stars
Alternative Press	3.5/5 stars
Consequence of Sound	2.5/5 stars
PopMatters	6/10
Sputnikmusic	4/5 stars
Ultimate Guitar Archive	4.9/10

== Track listing ==
All tracks are written by John Frusciante.

No.	Title	Length
1.	"Same"	10:16
2.	"Breathiac"	2:34
3.	"Shelf"	6:08
Total length:		19:13

Japanese Bonus Track
No.	Title	Length
4.	"Sol"	4:38
Total length:		23:41

== Personnel ==
=== Musicians ===
- John Frusciante – guitar, vocals, keyboards, synthesizers, drum machine, sequencer, samples

=== Recording personnel ===
- John Frusciante – production
- Anthony Zamora – studio manager

=== Artwork ===
- John Frusciante – cover art and design
