= The Empyrean =

Studio album by John Frusciante
- Released: January 20, 2009
- Recorded: December 2006–March 2008
- Genres: Experimental rock; psychedelic rock; post-rock
- Length: 54:02
- Label: Record Collection
- Producer: John Frusciante

John Frusciante chronology
AW II (2007)	The Empyrean (2009)	Omar Rodriguez Lopez & John Frusciante (2010)

John Frusciante solo chronology
Curtains (2005)	The Empyrean (2009)	Letur-Lefr (2012)

Professional ratings
Aggregate scores
Source	Rating
Metacritic	69/100
Review scores
Source	Rating
AllMusic	3.5/5 stars
Alternative Press	4/5 stars
Beats Per Minute	80%
NOW	4/5 stars
The Observer	4/5 stars
PopMatters	4/10
The Skinny	4/5 stars
Spin	7/10
Sputnikmusic	3.5/5 stars
Uncut	3/5 stars

The Empyrean is the eighth solo album by American musician John Frusciante, released worldwide on January 20, 2009 through Record Collection. Frusciante did not plan on a following tour, as he instead wanted to focus on writing and recording. The Empyrean peaked at number 151 on the US Billboard 200 as well as number seven on the Top Heatseekers. On release it made number 105 on the UK Albums Chart.

Frusciante said that the record "was recorded on and off between December 2006 and March 2008," and is a concept album that tells "a single story both musically and lyrically." The Empyrean contains a version of Tim Buckley's "Song to the Siren", from his 1970 album Starsailor. The record also features an array of collaborators and guest musicians, including Frusciante's bandmate Flea, and friends Josh Klinghoffer and the former Smiths guitarist Johnny Marr. Due to an error at the duplication plant, the United States CD release date was delayed until January 27. On June 2, 2010, a new bonus track, Here, Air, was added to the album, freely available at John's website.

On December 11, 2012, Record Collection re-issued various John Frusciante albums released from 2004 to 2009, including The Empyrean. These re-issued albums are available on 180-gram limited edition vinyl. Each LP also comes with a download card for your choice of MP3 or WAV file. The Empyrean was one of the most sought after John Frusciante LPs from the 2012 catalog reissue. According to John Frusciante's official website, the pre-order of the limited edition vinyl was sold out as of November 24, 2012; therefore, making it the first from the limited catalog reissue to do so. Additional stock of recording would be available in 2013.

A ten-year anniversary reissue, recut by John Frusciante and Bernie Grundman from the original analog tapes, was released on March 29, 2019. The reissue is a double disc LP that includes a download card of the album plus bonus tracks in hi-resolution.

A song which was written during The Empyrean sessions, "Scratch", was released as a free download on February 18, 2014 as an introductory track to the full-length record Enclosure released April 8, 2014.

At Metacritic, which assigns a weighted mean rating out of 100 to reviews from mainstream critics, the album received an average score of 69, based on 8 reviews, which indicates "generally favorable reviews".

== Album artwork ==
The artwork is a photograph of prints arranged to form a collage. The upper left region of the image contains various references to the natural world, such as the multiple images of green leaved trees and several superimposed images of mountains. Considering John's philosophy on life, it is plausible to draw that this arrangement is a reference to the Tree of life.

We are all reaching up in our own way and so even when we choose concrete things as the object of our desire, I feel that they are only symbols and that the real object of our desire is the creative force inherent in everything. It is what created us and perpetuates our lives, and so our creations are its creations. Kind of like if you built a robot that could think and feel, and then it painted a picture, that picture would be the result of the precise structure of thought and feeling you endowed the robot with. We're all grateful for what we've been given. Even when we are unhappy with everything, its "poor me", showing that we still think of that "me" and its feelings, as having a lot of significance. It's a pretty amazing thing to have this complex network of thought and feeling in these bodies. From where does it come? We've traced the cause of matter to something that required the preexistence of time, the principles of motion, space and many other things. The laws of motion, time and the space everything exists into, all have an untraced cause. And likewise we don't have any idea where things like perception and thought came from.

— John Frusciante

In the lower left corner, the presence of tree roots and semi-transparent fallen leaves reinforces the idea of the Tree of life.

Josh Klinghoffer, John's personal friend (whom he has collaborated with previously, as well as on The Empyrean) is pictured laying next to a skull, and connected to the angelic figure of John. This is a reference to death and rebirth, which is confirmed through John's blog posts. The two figures are connected through means of a rope or string. Considering the religious themes of the album (song titles "God" and "Heaven" are present on the album), it is plausible to draw the conclusion that this is a reference to God and Jesus. However John's figure could be interpreted as being Dante's Satan due to the similarity between the multiple pairs of wings and heads.

[The figure] eventually realizes that the highest point in heaven is a potential inside him, and that no thing is any different than anything else. What is beyond him is inside him and inside everyone. And that the feelings within him are perfectly suited to the opportunities to be creative here on earth.

The attempt to be one with that force is an ongoing challenge that is such a privilege, the fruits of which make all the confusion of the path part of the privilege. He realizes that the ways in which the imaginations source is hidden from him are guides and road signs to help him become one with that source by means of his own resourcefulness. He realizes that confusion and pain have been as much the cause of what's made his life meaningful and pleasureful as things he mistook for being pure goodness.

Everything here contains its contradiction and so up and down, left and right, forwards and backwards, happy and sad, pleasure and pain, are each two things, which are one. And all things we believe to be separate are one thing.

— John Frusciante

The helical staircase leading from the dead figure's resting place signifies rebirth and improvement until it reaches the highest point in heaven. The palace above the clouds is the representation John chooses to take of this concept. The album artwork is representative of the musical content of the album. This is reinforced through John's content in his blog posts.

The main character goes through extreme loneliness (in song two and the first half of song five) and at times thinks he can only merge with this force upon dying. In the 8th song of the story, a kind of suicide takes place, which results in a rebirth. It could be actual death or a shedding of the unnecessary parts of the personality. In any case, a rebirth takes place (songs 9 and 10) in which he finds himself filled with wonderment in regards to life. The more someone's actions are aligned with the creative force inherent in everything we know, the more that persons imagination will become one with that persons surroundings.

— John Frusciante

== Track listing ==
All tracks are written by John Frusciante, unless otherwise noted.

No.	Title	Writer(s)	Length
1.	"Before the Beginning"		9:09
2.	"Song to the Siren"	Tim Buckley, Larry Beckett	3:33
3.	"Unreachable"		6:10
4.	"God"		3:23
5.	"Dark/Light"		8:30
6.	"Heaven"		4:03
7.	"Enough of Me"		4:14
8.	"Central"		7:16
9.	"One More of Me"		4:06
10.	"After the Ending"		3:38
Total length:			54:02

US iTunes bonus track
No.	Title	Length
11.	"Ah Yom"	3:17
Total length:		57:19

Japan bonus tracks
No.	Title	Length
11.	"Today"	4:38
12.	"Ah Yom"	3:17
Total length:		61:57

2010 free download
No.	Title	Length
13.	"Here, Air"	3:47
Total length:		65:44

== Personnel ==
- John Frusciante – lead vocals, lead and rhythm guitar, acoustic guitar, keyboards, piano, synthesizers, Bass VI on "Dark/Light" and "Central", drum machine, backing vocals
- Josh Klinghoffer – drums, percussion, electric piano, organ, piano, synthesizers, backing vocals
- Flea – bass guitar on "Unreachable", "God", "Heaven", "Enough of Me", "Today", and "Ah Yom"
- Johnny Marr – electric guitar on "Enough of Me", electric and acoustic guitar on "Central"
- Donald Taylor and the New Dimension Singers – backing vocals on "Dark/Light"
- Lawrence Young – backing vocals on "Dark/Light"
- Sonus Quartet – strings
- Geoff Gallegof – string arrangement on "God" and "One More of Me"
- Neel Hammond – string arrangement on "Enough of Me"
- Vanessa Freebairn-Smith – string arrangement on "Central"

Production

- Ryan Hewitt – recording engineer
- Adam Samuels – recording engineer
- Dave Lee – instrument tech
- Sarah Sitkin – cover art
- Anthony Zamora – production coordination

== Charts ==
Chart (2009)	Peak position
Dutch Album Chart	61
Swiss Album Chart	57
UK Albums Chart	105
US Billboard 200	151
US Heatseekers Albums (Billboard)	4
