= Inside of Emptiness =

Studio album by John Frusciante
- Released: October 26, 2004
- Recorded: March 8–13, 2004
- Genres: Art rock, indie rock
- Length: 39:31
- Label: Record Collection
- Producer: John Frusciante

John Frusciante chronology
DC EP (2004)	Inside of Emptiness (2004)	A Sphere in the Heart of Silence (2004)

Professional ratings
Review scores
Source	Rating
AllMusic	3.5/5 stars
Pitchfork	6.0/10

Inside of Emptiness is the sixth studio album by American musician John Frusciante, released on October 26, 2004, on Record Collection, and is the fourth in a series of six releases, issued from June 2004 to February 2005. The album features contributions from Josh Klinghoffer and Omar Rodríguez-López.

Frusciante notes, "It's really powerful, but in a gentle way. There's a soothing quality. It has hard things on it, and even the soft things have a heaviness to them. The song "Scratches" is emotionally heavy to me, even though it's not distorted guitars and bashing drums. There's another song about a couple's baby dying. There's a lot of spontaneity and recklessness and not giving a fuck."

The vinyl edition of the record saw a repressing from Record Collection on December 11, 2012. These reissued records are 180 gram and come with a download of choice between MP3 and WAV formats of the album.

== Track listing ==
All tracks are written by John Frusciante.

No.	Title	Length
1.	"What I Saw"	4:00
2.	"The World's Edge"	2:34
3.	"Inside a Break"	3:07
4.	"A Firm Kick"	4:33
5.	"Look On"	6:10
6.	"Emptiness"	3:34
7.	"I'm Around"	3:49
8.	"666"	4:53
9.	"Interior Two"	2:27
10.	"Scratches"	4:19
Total length:		39:31

== Personnel ==
- John Frusciante – lead and backing vocals, guitar, synthesizer, keyboard, bass ("The World's Edge", "666"), production, design
- Josh Klinghoffer – drums, bass, keyboard, backing vocals, guitar ("I'm Around"), guitar solo ("Inside a Break", "Emptiness")
- Omar Rodríguez-López – lead guitar ("666")
- Ryan Hewitt – engineer, mixing
- Kevin Dean – assistant
- Bernie Grundman – mastering
- Lola Montes – photography
- Mike Piscitelli – design
- Dave Lee – equipment technician
