= Automatic painting =

Automatic painting or automatic drawing may refer to:

- Automatic painting (robotic)
- Spiritualist art § Automatic drawing
- Surrealist automatism § Automatic drawing and painting

== See also ==
- Automatic writing (disambiguation)
