= The Will to Death =

Studio album by John Frusciante
- Released: June 22, 2004
- Recorded: December 2003 and January 2004
- Length: 42:23
- Label: Record Collection
- Producer: John Frusciante

John Frusciante chronology
Shadows Collide with People (2004)	The Will to Death (2004)	Automatic Writing (2004)

Professional ratings
Aggregate scores
Source	Rating
Metacritic	68/100
Review scores
Source	Rating
AllMusic	3.5/5 stars
Alternative Press	4/5 stars
NME	6/10
Mojo	3.5/5 stars
Pitchfork	7.4/10
Q	3/5 stars
Tiny Mix Tapes	4/5 stars

The Will to Death is the fifth studio album by American musician John Frusciante, released on June 22, 2004 on Record Collection. The album reached #36 on the Top Independent Albums chart.

The vinyl edition of the record saw a repressing from Record Collection on December 11, 2012. These reissued records are 180 gram and come with a download of choice between MP3 and WAV formats of the album.

Frequent collaborator Josh Klinghoffer appears, performing drums, bass, guitar, and keyboard.

The album cover is a photo taken on Cimitero Monumentale di Milano. The man is Luigi Ontani.

== Background and recording ==
In 2004 Frusciante announced that he would produce six albums during a six-month break from the Red Hot Chili Peppers, with The Will to Death being the first of these. Following the long and costly recording of his previous album, Shadows Collide with People, Frusciante decided to experiment with recording music quickly and in a minimalist fashion, performing a maximum of two takes per track.

Frusciante has stated that the album is intended to be "the opposite of Shadows Collide with People":

On The Will to Death, I thought it would be a good idea to make a record with very little backing vocals, because we’d done it so much on Shadows. I always have to have a new idea for each album. For The Will to Death, the idea was to have very little backing vocals. There’s a lot of other huge differences. In every way, I wanted the opposite of Shadows.

On January 16, 2013, John provided a definition and theory of "The Will to Death" on his website.

== Track listing ==
All tracks are written by John Frusciante, unless otherwise noted.

No.	Title	Writer(s)	Length
1.	"A Doubt"		4:19
2.	"An Exercise"		3:47
3.	"Time Runs Out"		4:00
4.	"Loss"		5:20
5.	"Unchanging"		3:54
6.	"The Mirror"		3:02
7.	"A Loop"		4:32
8.	"Wishing"		2:48
9.	"Far Away"		2:17
10.	"The Days Have Turned"		2:23
11.	"Helical"	John Frusciante, Josh Klinghoffer	2:13
12.	"The Will to Death"		3:48
Total length:			42:23

== Personnel ==
The following people contributed to The Will to Death:

=== Musicians ===
- John Frusciante – vocals, guitar, piano, synthesizer, bass guitar on "Far Away", "Unchanging" and "The Will to Death"
- Josh Klinghoffer – drums, bass, keyboards, guitar on "Helical" and "The Will to Death"

=== Recording personnel ===
- John Frusciante – producer
- Ryan Hewitt – engineer, mixing
- Rafael Serrano – recording assistant
- Jeff Moses – recording assistant
- Bernie Grundman – mastering
- Dave Lee – equipment

=== Artwork ===
- Lola Montes Schnabel – cover photograph
- Mike Piscitelli – design
- John Frusciante – design
