= Sonus Quartet =

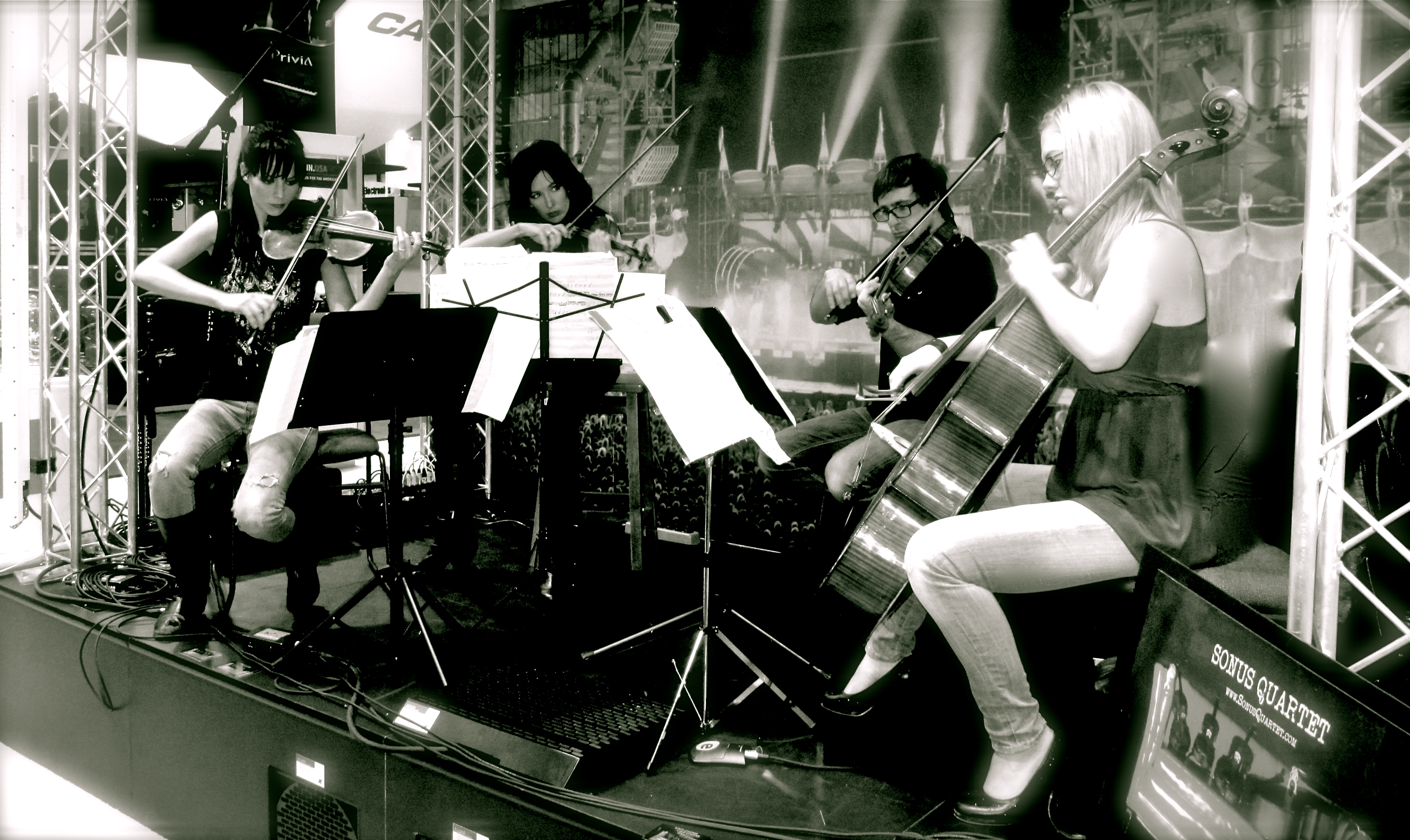
- Sonus Quartet playing the 2010 NAMM Show

Background information
- Origin: Los Angeles, CA
- Genres: Rock, pop, classical, jazz
- Years active: 2003–present
- Members: Caroline Campbell (violin), Kathleen Sloan (violin), Neel Hammond (viola), Vanessa Freebairn-Smith (cello)
- Website: www.sonusquartet.com

Sonus Quartet is a Los Angeles-based string quartet whose members include Caroline Campbell (violin I), Kathleen Sloan (violin II), Neel Hammond (viola), and Vanessa Freebairn-Smith (cello). Freebairn-Smith and Hammond formed Sonus Quartet in 2003.

== Composition ==
Sonus has composed arrangements which have been featured on John Frusciante's The Empyrean, Van Hunt's On The Jungle Floor and Martina Topley-Bird's The Blue God, as well as albums by Boyz II Men and One Eskimo. Sonus performs often in L.A., at venues such as The Bootleg Theater, Room 5, Molly Malone's, as well as Walt Disney Concert Hall. They include a variety of repertoire from original Sonus arrangements of classical pieces such as a 15th-century madrigal or a Shostakovich quartet, to popular music from The Cure or Clint Mansell’s Lux Aeterna.

== Film ==
Sonus has played live with film composer Clint Mansell and contributed to the recording of Mansell's score for the film Moon (2009).
