= Speed Dealer Moms EP =

EP by Speed Dealer Moms
- Released: December 6, 2010
- Recorded: March 2010
- Length: 16:38
- Label: Timesig

Speed Dealer Moms chronology
Speed Dealer Moms EP (2010)	SDM-LA8-441-114-211 (2021)

John Frusciante chronology
Sepulcros de Miel (2010)	Speed Dealer Moms EP (2010)	Letur-Lefr (2012)

Speed Dealer Moms EP is a 2010 record by the electronic band Speed Dealer Moms, consisting of John Frusciante, Aaron Funk and Chris McDonald. It was released on December 6, 2010 on Planet Mu Records.

== Track listing ==
No.	Title	Length
1.	"March_Three-3"	6:35
2.	"March_Four"	10:03
Total length:		16:38
