= Brother Reade =

American hip hop group

- Origin: Los Angeles, California, United States
- Genres: hip-hop
- Label: Record Collection
- Website: brotherreade.com

Brother Reade is an American hip-hop duo from Los Angeles. Its members are MC Jimmy Jamz (also Jael Jamz, Major Jamz) and DJ Bobby Evans (also Kill You Me You).

== History ==
The two first began playing together in a punk rock band in their native Winston-Salem, North Carolina. When Evans went to college in Los Angeles, Jael soon moved out West as well, and the two began recording as underground hip hop artists, taking their name from Jael's brother Reade, who is autistic. The group released a number of bootlegs before signing to Record Collection and releasing their first EP in 2005. Spin described the band's approach on the EP as a "Streets-like investigation of going nowhere slow."

Critical acclaim built as the group released its first full-length, 2007's Rap Music, which Pitchfork Media's Roque Strew called "so standoffishly humble, so extravagantly matter-of-fact." Chris Gaerig of Stylus Magazine wrote that while "Rap Music won't be much of a commercial success ... Brother Reade might just be the great group indie-rap has been unable to produce for nearly a decade." Spin's Josh Modell said that the duo's "subtle flair and smarts make up for the occasional tossed-off cliché."

== Discography ==
- The Illustrated Guide to: 9 to 5 EP (Record Collection, 2005)
- Rap Music (Record Collection, 2007)
