= Ataxia (band) =

American rock band

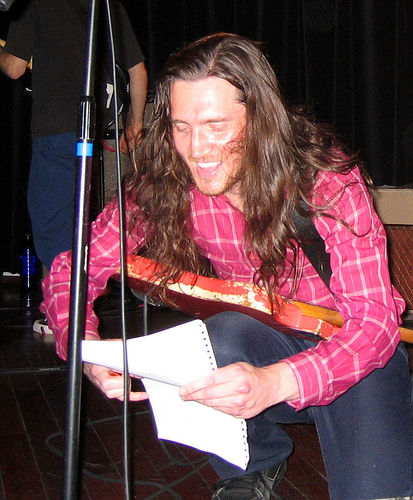
- Frusciante performing with Ataxia in 2004

Background information
- Genres: Art rock; experimental rock; post-punk; psychedelic rock; electronica
- Years active: January – February 2004
- Members: John Frusciante; Joe Lally; Josh Klinghoffer

Ataxia was an American experimental rock supergroup formed in 2004 by guitarist John Frusciante (Red Hot Chili Peppers), bassist Joe Lally (Fugazi) and drummer Josh Klinghoffer (Dot Hacker, The Bicycle Thief), who later became the lead guitarist for Red Hot Chili Peppers during Frusciante's absence, until Frusciante rejoined in 2019.

Ataxia wrote and recorded songs for two weeks, and the material was separated into two albums: Automatic Writing (2004) and AW II (2007). The songs all feature a ground-bass line with the guitar overlaying different motifs and long developments. In March 2008, Lally described the band's writing process:

The songs would be initiated by me settling into a bass line. While the bass line was forming Josh would be playing and John would start to do something - with a few minutes, with a beat, I’d just keep going. There were no thoughts to it being the 'end product', a recording, but it led to that. The goal was just to see how quickly we could work music into place - I think it was a really interesting exercise for [Frusciante and Klinghoffer]. [...] The project really was just to be a show, not a recording, and no one would ever hear it again.

Ataxia performed two shows, both at the Knitting Factory in Los Angeles, on February 2 and February 3, 2004. The group then disbanded. Josh Klinghoffer continued to work with Frusciante on his solo projects and as a touring musician with the Red Hot Chili Peppers.

== Band members ==
- John Frusciante – electric guitar, vocals, synthesizer
- Joe Lally – bass guitar, vocals
- Josh Klinghoffer – drums, vocals, synthesizer

== Discography ==
- Automatic Writing (2004)
- AW II (2007)
