= PBX Funicular Intaglio Zone =

Studio album by John Frusciante
- Released: September 12, 2012
- Recorded: 2011
- Genre: Art pop, electronica, experimental rock, lo-fi, drum and bass, breakbeat
- Length: 36:58; 46:17 (Japanese release)
- Label: Record Collection
- Producer: John Frusciante

John Frusciante chronology
Sect In Sgt (2012)	PBX Funicular Intaglio Zone (2012)	Outsides (2013)

PBX Funicular Intaglio Zone is the ninth studio album by American musician John Frusciante, released in September 2012 on Record Collection. The album was released in multiple formats, including CD, vinyl, 32-bit digital formats and cassette.

Self-produced by Frusciante, the album was preceded by the EP Letur-Lefr (2012) and the free download "Walls and Doors".

== Background and recording ==
Frusciante spoke about this album and his previous album Letur-Lefr by saying "I consider my music to be progressive synthpop, which says nothing about what it sounds like, but does describe my basic approach. I combine aspects of many styles of music and create my own musical forms by way of electronic instruments. The tracks on Letur-Lefr are from 2010 and PBX was made in 2011. Letur is a compilation, a selected portion of music I made that year while PBX was conceived as an album, the songs having been recorded in succession. The records are very different from each other."

On 15 August 2012, the song "Walls and Doors" was released as a free download via Frusciante's official site. Frusciante added that this song marks the point at which he began combining 60s and early 70s production styles with modern electronic production; as well as balancing pop music with abstract forms of music; which further allowed him to combine the pop part with the more adventurous part of himself.

== Album name ==
Following is what Frusciante said on his blog: "PBX refers to an internal communication system. There is a natural version of this, wherein the 'business or office' is a person. A funicular involves two trams connected by a cable, one going up while the other goes down. All music perpetually does this on many levels simultaneously. Intaglio is a technique in sculpture where one works on the opposite side of the image, whereby the image will eventually appear to the spectator in relief, but the angle the sculptor works from is the negation of that. In music that I like, an approach analogous to this was employed, the more so the better. Zone refers to a state of mind wherein the rest of the world seemingly disappears, and nothing matters but the union of one's immediate surroundings with one's feelings. These four words linked together go far to describing my creative process."

== Reception ==
Professional ratings
Review scores
Source	Rating
AllMusic	2.5/5 stars
Consequence of Sound	3/5 stars

Allmusic's Fred Thomas gave the album a mixed review, stating, "The ever-winding path of John Frusciante's solo career is a confusing one to say the least. [...] The thing is, there's no doubt that Frusciante is sincere in his expression with this incredibly warped music. There's no easy explanation for these sounds, no context for a lot of the choices he makes with the rapid-fire style changes and jarring production choices that come one after another after another on almost every song here."

== Track listing ==
All tracks are written by John Frusciante.

No.	Title	Length
1.	"Intro/Sabam"	2:40
2.	"Hear Say"	3:47
3.	"Bike"	4:24
4.	"Ratiug"	6:26
5.	"Guitar"	2:17
6.	"Mistakes"	3:50
7.	"Uprane"	4:55
8.	"Sam"	4:21
9.	"Sum"	4:18
Total length:		36:58

Japanese Bonus Tracks
No.	Title	Length
10.	"Ratiug" (A Capella)	5:15
11.	"Walls and Doors"	4:01
Total length:		46:17

== Personnel ==
=== Musicians ===
- John Frusciante – vocals, backing vocals, synthesizers, guitar, bass, keyboards, samples, drum machine
- Kinetic 9 – vocals (4, 10)
- Laena Geronimo – violin (7)

=== Recording personnel ===
- John Frusciante – production
- Anthony Zamora – studio manager

=== Artwork ===
- John Frusciante – cover art and design
- Julian Chavez – cover design
- Mike Piscitelli – photo

== Charts ==
Chart (2012)	Peak position
US Top Heatseekers (Billboard)	38
