= Automatic Writing (album) =

Studio album by Ataxia
- Released: August 10, 2004
- Recorded: January 2004
- Genre: Psychedelic rock
- Length: 44:42
- Label: Record Collection
- Producer: John Frusciante

Ataxia chronology
Automatic Writing (2004)	AW II (2007)

John Frusciante chronology
The Will to Death (2004)	Automatic Writing (2004)	DC EP (2004)

Professional ratings
Review scores
Source	Rating
AllMusic	3.5/5 stars
The Guardian	2/5 stars
Pitchfork	7.1/10
Sputnikmusic	5/5 stars

Automatic Writing is the debut studio album by American experimental rock band Ataxia, released on August 10, 2004 on Record Collection. Ataxia consisted of Red Hot Chili Peppers guitarist John Frusciante, Joe Lally of Fugazi, and Josh Klinghoffer, Frusciante's subsequent successor in the Red Hot Chili Peppers.

The band recorded 10 songs, approximately 80 minutes of content, over a two-week period, and played two live shows in a matter of four days. A second album, entitled AW II, was released on May 29, 2007 with the remaining five tracks recorded during this session.

The vinyl edition of the record saw a repressing from Record Collection on December 11, 2012. These reissued records are 180 gram and come with a download of choice between MP3 and WAV formats of the album.

Regarding this release, Frusciante noted, "If you like me cause you saw me live, and I was beating the fuck out of my guitar, then this record - which is a collaboration with Josh Klinghoffer and Joe Lally - will give you what you're looking for. If you don't care about song structure, and you want powerful music with fucked-up guitar-playing and songs that are really long, this record is the one."

== Track listing ==
All tracks are written by John Frusciante, Joe Lally and Josh Klinghoffer.

No.	Title	Length
1.	"Dust"	8:56
2.	"Another"	6:22
3.	"The Sides"	6:45
4.	"Addition"	10:15
5.	"Montreal"	12:24
Total length:		44:42

== Personnel ==
The following people contributed to Automatic Writing:

=== Band ===
- John Frusciante – guitar, synthesizers, vocals ("Dust", "The Sides", "Another" and "Addition")
- Joe Lally – bass, vocals ("Montreal")
- Josh Klinghoffer – drums, synthesizers, vocals ("Another")

=== Recording personnel ===
- John Frusciante – producer
- Ryan Hewitt – engineer, mixing
- Ryan Castle – assistant
- Bernie Grundman – mastering

=== Artwork ===
- Lola Montes – photography
- Mike Piscitelli – design
- John Frusciante – design
