= Record Collection (record label) =

Record label

Record Collection is an independent Los Angeles, California-based music company founded by filmmaker and music manager Jordan Tappis. Record Collection is home to a diverse roster which includes music from current Red Hot Chili Peppers' guitarist John Frusciante, The Walkmen, Blake Mills, Dawes, Murs, Black Knights and management clients Blake Mills, Matt Sweeney and Fiona Apple.

== Notable releases ==
Between June 2004 and February 2005, the label released a series of six albums by John Frusciante. One album, Automatic Writing, was released under the band name Ataxia (which was composed of Frusciante, Joe Lally and Josh Klinghoffer). The album A Sphere in the Heart of Silence was released with Josh Klinghoffer. The records each show a different side of Frusciante's musical style, going from crude rock (Inside of Emptiness) to Pop (DC EP) and even electronic music (A Sphere in the Heart of Silence). In 2007, Record Collection released the follow-up to Automatic Writing by Ataxia, named AW II.

In 2005, Record Collection released the Caveat Emptor EP by the Arizona-based post-hardcore/metalcore band Greeley Estates.

In 2006, Record Collection released Greeley Estates' second studio album Far From The Lies, and Simon Dawes' Carnivore.

In 2007, Record Collection released the Spider-Man 3 soundtrack which featured all new music from artists such as The Flaming Lips, The Killers and The Yeah Yeah Yeahs.

In 2009, Record Collection released Frusciante's acclaimed album The Empyrean as well as Dawes breakthrough album North Hills.

In 2010, Record Collection released the debut single from LA punk outfit Funeral Party and Break Mirrors the critically acclaimed debut album from producer/singer-songwriter Blake Mills.

In 2012, Record Collection released two new albums from Frusciante, an EP called Letur Lefr and an LP called PBX Funicular Intaglio Zone and the debut self-titled 7" from LA band Buckaroo.

In 2013 Record Collection released Outsides from Frusciante, Continuation Day from Tom Gallo, Year of the Dragon from yMusic and more.

In 2014, Record Collection released Medieval Chamber, the comeback album from Wu-Tang Clan affiliates Black Knights, produced by John Frusciante. Upcoming releases include Frusciante's Enclosure as well as new releases from Blake Mills and Tom Gallo.

In 2015, Record Collection released "Year of the Dragon," an EP from avant-garde classical music ensemble YMusic, "The Almighty" the critically acclaimed follow up to Black Knights breakout LP "Medieval Chamber" and "Heigh Ho", the long-awaited sophomore album from Blake Mills.

== Production ==
In 2011, Record Collection produced God Bless Ozzy Osbourne a feature documentary about Ozzy Osbourne.

In 2012 Record Collection created the music documentary mini series Sound & Vision featuring artists such as JEFF the Brotherhood, Haim and Detroit hip hop group Clear Soul Forces. In April 2013, Sound & Vision, a co-production between Red Bull and Record Collection and directed by Jordan Tappis and Mike Piscitelli, was nominated for a Webby Award under the category best online film & video: music.

== Management ==
Past and present Record Collection management clients include Blake Mills, John Frusciante, Fiona Apple, Bonnie 'Prince' Billy, Matt Sweeney, Cass Mccombs.

== Roster ==
- 21 motion picture score
- Fiona Apple
- Ataxia
- Bonnie "Prince" Billy
- Brother Reade
- The Cubical
- Dawes
- Simon Dawes
- Kate Earl
- John Frusciante
- Tom Gallo
- Funeral Party
- Danielle Haim
- Hot Hot Heat
- Jesca Hoop
- Cass Mccombs
- Blake Mills
- Mt. Egypt
- Murs
- Spider-Man 3 soundtrack
- Supreeme
- The Walkmen
- Wassup Rockers soundtrack
- yMusic

== Productions ==
- God Bless Ozzy Osbourne
- Sound & Vision Seasons 1 and 2
- Red Bull On Boarding
- Anything We Want

== See also ==
- List of record labels
