= AW II =

Studio album by Ataxia
- Released: May 29, 2007 (CD); June 19, 2007 (vinyl)
- Recorded: January 2004
- Genre: Post-rock
- Length: 36:57
- Label: Record Collection
- Producer: John Frusciante

Ataxia chronology
Automatic Writing (2004)	AW II (2007)

John Frusciante solo chronology
The Special 12 Singles Series (2005)	AW II (2007)	The Empyrean (2009)

AW II is the second studio album by Ataxia, released on May 29, 2007 on Record Collection. The album is the second half of the band's sole recording session which took place in January 2004. The lineup features John Frusciante on guitars and vocals, Josh Klinghoffer on drums, and Joe Lally's bass guitar. The album is released under the Record Collection label, as is the solo work of Klinghoffer and Frusciante.

The album was leaked onto the internet in March 2006. However, there are several differences between the leak and the properly released record. The track listing has been rearranged, some of the tracks have been renamed and the sound of the tracks has undergone minor changes. Upon release there were few physical copies of AW II, and the album was ultimately reissued on October 26, 2009. The reissue is no longer available from the record label as of April 2012.

The vinyl edition of the record saw a repressing from Record Collection on December 11, 2012. These reissued records are 180 gram and come with a download of choice between MP3 and WAV formats of the album.

In March 2008, regarding the band's cult following and AW II's delayed release, bassist Joe Lally stated:

It’s strange when people start paying attention to it. I think we all agree that if we were to ever do it again, we'd do more work on it; that’s why the second release was kinda' downgraded. If we thought people were that interested, it'd have been marketed more.

== Track listing ==
All tracks are written by John Frusciante, Joe Lally and Josh Klinghoffer.

No.	Title	Length
1.	"Attention"	11:46
2.	"Union"	4:37
3.	"Hands"	4:04
4.	"The Soldier"	10:04
5.	"The Empty's Response"	6:15
Total length:		36:57

== Personnel ==
The following people contributed to AW II:

=== Band ===
- John Frusciante – guitar, synthesizer, vocals
- Joe Lally – bass
- Josh Klinghoffer – drums, synthesizer, vocals ("The Empty's Response")

=== Recording personnel ===
- John Frusciante – producer
- Ryan Hewitt – engineer, mixing
- Dave Collins – mastering

=== Artwork ===
- Lola Montes – photography
- Mike Piscitelli – design
- John Frusciante – design
