= John Frusciante discography =

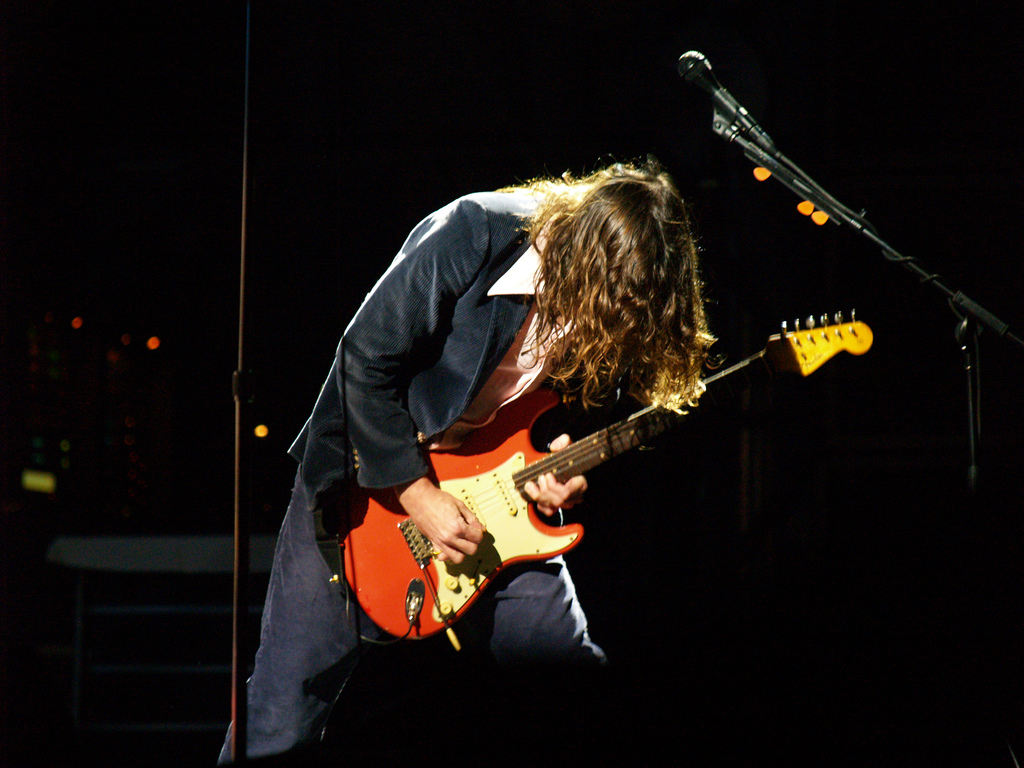
Frusciante with Red Hot Chili Peppers at the 2006 Voodoo Experience in New Orleans

The discography of John Frusciante, who is best known as the guitarist of the rock band Red Hot Chili Peppers, consists of thirteen solo albums, two internet only release albums, seven EPs, as well as two albums with collaborators Joe Lally and Josh Klinghoffer under the name Ataxia and two EPs and five studio albums under the alias of Trickfinger. After recording Mother's Milk and Blood Sugar Sex Magik, Frusciante left the Red Hot Chili Peppers in 1992 when he got tired of the growing success of the band. He released his first solo album, Niandra LaDes and Usually Just a T-Shirt, in 1994 on American Recordings. His second record, Smile From the Streets You Hold, was released in 1997 and later taken off the market at his request in 1999. After returning to the Red Hot Chili Peppers in 1998, Frusciante recorded Californication with the band and subsequently released his third solo album, To Record Only Water for Ten Days, in February 2001 on Warner Music Group.

Red Hot Chili Peppers released By the Way in 2002, with Frusciante taking a central role in the songwriting. Following the album's tour, Frusciante released Shadows Collide with People in 2004; it became his first solo album to influence a music chart and is his only solo album to date featuring Chad Smith. In 2004, Frusciante switched from Warner Brothers to the Record Collection label and released a series of six records in six months. Four of six included collaboration with multi-instrumentalist Josh Klinghoffer and the period produced collaborations with Fugazi members Joe Lally and Jerry Busher, and producer Ian MacKaye, as well as Carla Azar and Omar Rodriguez-Lopez.

Frusciante began working with Omar Rodríguez-López in 2001 and has since collaborated on many recordings under both artists' names. Frusciante also was considered an honorary member of The Mars Volta from 2002 to 2008, occasionally performing live with the band from 2003 to 2006. Frusciante served as executive producer on Rodríguez-López's first film, released in 2010, The Sentimental Engine Slayer, which was filmed in 2007.

In 2006, the Red Hot Chili Peppers released their Grammy Award-winning double album Stadium Arcadium. Frusciante began work on his tenth solo record, The Empyrean, shortly thereafter and subsequently released the album in early 2009. In December 2009, Frusciante revealed that he had left Red Hot Chili Peppers more than a year earlier, during their hiatus. Since then, he has gone on to release 2012's Letur-Lefr EP and Sect In Sgt EP (the latter recorded under the alias of Trickfinger), the full-length follow-up PBX Funicular Intaglio Zone, its experimental sequel, 2014's Enclosure, his 2015 album, Trickfinger followed by Trickfinger II in 2017. Frusciante has also gone on to collaborate as Speed Dealer Moms with Venetian Snares, and with Swahili Blonde and Kimono Kult with his ex-wife, Nicole Turley, as well as with Black Knights. He has also released a number of solo tracks on his bandcamp and soundcloud pages. In December 2019, Frusciante again re-joined the Red Hot Chili Peppers, and their twelfth album Unlimited Love was ultimately released on April 1, 2022 and was followed soon after by their thirteenth album, Return of the Dream Canteen on October 14, 2022. Frusciante continues to release solo albums under his own name and his Trickfinger alias with three new releases in 2020 and two new Speed Dealer Moms EPs since 2021. A four album box set featuring two new Trickfinger albums was released in July 2026.

== Solo material ==
=== Studio albums ===
Title	Album notes	Notes
Niandra LaDes and Usually Just a T-Shirt	Label: American Recordings (#68-02); Released: November 22, 1994; Formats: CD, cassette, vinyl	Debut solo album.; Taken off the market in 1998 at Frusciante's request. Has since gone back into print.; Vinyl pressing October 2017 from Superior Viaduct records – black vinyl & translucent red vinyl (with bonus 7" limited to 1,000)
Smile from the Streets You Hold	Label: Birdman (BMR #016); Released: August 26, 1997; Formats: CD	Taken off the market in 1998 at Frusciante's request and remains out of print.; Planned for re-release by Frusciante in the future.
To Record Only Water for Ten Days	Label: Warner Bros. Records (#48045-2); Released: February 13, 2001; Formats: CD, cassette, vinyl	First solo release on Warner Bros. Records.; Vinyl pressing January 2017 limited to 1,500 copies from Twelve Suns records; Vinyl pressing April 2026 limited to 3,000 copies Warner / Rhino
Shadows Collide with People	Label: Warner Bros. Records (#2-48660); Released: February 24, 2004; Formats: CD, vinyl	First album on which Frusciante collaborated with Klinghoffer, and only album with Chad Smith.; Peaked at #191 on the Billboard Top 200; #11 on Top Heatseekers, #46 on the Official German Album Chart and #53 on the UK Albums Chart.
The Will to Death	Label: Record Collection (#48800-2); Released: June 22, 2004; Formats: CD, vinyl	Peaked at #109 on the UK Albums Chart.
Inside of Emptiness	Label: Record Collection (#48907-2); Released: October 26, 2004; Formats: CD, vinyl	Peaked at #34 on the Independent Albums chart.
Curtains	Label: Record Collection (#48595-2); Released: February 1, 2005; Formats: CD, vinyl	
The Empyrean	Label: Record Collection; Released: January 20, 2009; Formats: CD, vinyl	Peaked at #151 on the Billboard Top 200; #7 on Top Heatseekers and #105 on the UK Albums Chart.
PBX Funicular Intaglio Zone	Label: Record Collection; Released: September 25, 2012; Formats: CD, vinyl, digital, 32 bit / 96,000 kHz WAV files, cassette	Peaked at #99 on the German Official Album Chart.
Enclosure	Label: Record Collection; Released: April 8, 2014; Formats: CD, vinyl, cassette	Peaked at #112 on Belgium's Flanders Ultratop chart.
Maya	Label: Timesig; Released: October 23, 2020; Formats: Digital download, vinyl, CD	
I	Label: Acid Test; Released: February 3, 2023; Formats: Vinyl	
II	Label: Acid Test; Released: February 3, 2023; Formats: Digital download, CD	

=== Internet albums ===
Title	Album notes	Notes
From the Sounds Inside	Label: Self-released; Released: 2001	Internet-only release
Renoise Tracks 2009–2011	Label: Self-released on Bandcamp; Released: November 24, 2015; Formats: Digital download, vinyl (High Low disc of In a Box 2026 set)	Internet-only release; Collection of tracks recorded from 2009 to 2011. Made available for free on his personal Bandcamp account, alongside other tracks.; Vinyl contained 6 of 8 tracks previously released

=== EPs ===
Title	Album notes
Estrus EP	Label: Birdman; Backed with "Outside Space"; Released: 1997; Formats: Vinyl EP
Going Inside	Label: Warner Bros. Records; Backed with "Time Is Nothing", "So Would've I", "Last Hymn", and "Beginning Again"; Released: March 5, 2001; Formats: CD, vinyl (as bonus tracks on TROWFTD 2026 RSD)
The Brown Bunny	Label: Tulip Records, Twelve Suns; Motion picture soundtrack; Frusciante contributed five songs: "Forever Away", "Dying Song", "Leave All the Days Behind", "Prostitution Song", and "Falling"; Released: May 4, 2004 / April 26, 2014 (reissue); Formats: CD, vinyl (bootleg), vinyl (official 2014) limited to 1,000 copies
DC EP	Label: Record Collection (#48877-2); Backed with "Dissolve", "Goals", "A Corner", and "Repeating"; Released: September 14, 2004; Formats: CD, vinyl
Letur-Lefr	Label: Record Collection; Backed with "In Your Eyes", "909 Day", "Glowe", "FM", "In My Light"; Released: July 17, 2012; Formats: CD, vinyl, digital, 32 bit / 96,000 kHz WAV files, cassette
Outsides	Label: Record Collection; 3 song EP plus one bonus track; Released: August 14, 2013; Formats: CD, vinyl, digital, 32 bit / 96,000 kHz WAV files, cassette
4-Track Guitar Music	Label: Self-released on Bandcamp; 6 song EP; Released: November 24, 2015; Formats: Digital download
Foregrow	Label: Acid Test (Absurd Recordings); Backed with "Foregrow", "Expre'act", "Lowth Forgue", "Unf"; Released: April 16, 2016 (RSD black vinyl) / June 7, 2016 (CD) / August 12, 2016 (silver vinyl); Formats: CD, vinyl

=== Singles ===
Title	Album/single notes	Notes
The Special 12 Singles Series	Label: GSL; Released: physical 2005, digital 2006; 7" yellow splatter vinyl single	"0=2", "0" recorded in Spring 2003; Later released on the ORL & JF album in 2010; Credited as Omar A. Rodriguez-Lopez and John Frusciante
"Wayne"	Self-released: April 7, 2013; Formats: "Free digital download". Archived from the original on 2016-04-22.	Written and dedicated to the memory of his late friend, former Red Hot Chili Peppers' tour chef Wayne Forman
"Fight for Love"	Self-released: November 24, 2015; Formats: "Free digital download". Archived from the original on 2016-01-07.	Guitars, drum machine; "Recorded one sunny afternoon in November 2013"; Interpretation of a song from the film Casa De Mi Padre by Will Ferrell & Génesis Rodríguez
"Medre"	Self-released: November 24, 2015; Formats: "Free digital download". Archived from the original on 2016-04-05.	Recorded in 2008

=== Trickfinger ===
Title	Album notes	Notes
Sect In Sgt	Label: Neurotic Yell Records; Released: July 30, 2012; Formats: Free digital download	Two song EP of sampled music released under the alias/moniker of Trickfinger; The full version of the title track was released for free digitally in November 2015
Trickfinger	Label: Acid Test (Absurd Recordings); Released: April 7, 2015; Formats: CD, vinyl, green LPs (2026 reissue)	Debut album of acid house music released under the alias of Trickfinger
Trickfinger II	Label: Acid Test (Absurd Recordings); Released: September 8, 2017; Formats: CD, vinyl, red LP (2026 reissue)	Six song mini-album recorded in 2007 (25:54 in length)
Look Down, See Us	Label: Evar Records; Released: March 29, 2020; Formats: digital download	Four song EP
She Smiles Because She Presses the Button	Label: Evar Records; Released: June 5, 2020; Formats: CD, vinyl, digital download	Trickfinger's third full-length as a six song mini-LP
In a Box	Label: Acid Test (Absurd Recordings); Released: July 10, 2026; Formats: Vinyl, digital download	Four album, 5LP box set that includes reissues of Trickfinger and Trickfinger II on colored vinyl along with two new albums, High Low & Rotation

=== With Josh Klinghoffer ===
Title	Album notes
A Sphere in the Heart of Silence	Label: Record Collection (#48949-2); Released: November 23, 2004; Formats: CD, vinyl

=== Ataxia ===
Title	Album notes	Notes
Automatic Writing	Label: Record Collection; Released: August 10, 2004; Formats: CD, LP	First half from the ten track session Ataxia held in 2004.; Ataxia is John Frusciante on guitar and vocals, Joe Lally on bass, and Josh Klinghoffer on drums.
AW II	Label: Record Collection; Released: May 29, 2007; Formats: CD, LP	Second half of the Ataxia session; Released the same day as other albums John appears on, Omar's Se Dice Bisonte, No Búfalo and Perry's Satellite Party

== With Red Hot Chili Peppers ==
=== Studio albums ===
Title	Album notes	Notes
Mother's Milk	Label: EMI; Released: August 16, 1989	Debut album with Red Hot Chili Peppers
Blood Sugar Sex Magik	Label: Warner Bros. Records; Released: September 24, 1991	Frusciante left the Chili Peppers during the album's tour in 1992
Californication	Label: Warner Bros. Records; Released: June 8, 1999	First album after returning to the Chili Peppers in 1998
By the Way	Label: Warner Bros. Records; Released: July 9, 2002	
Stadium Arcadium	Label: Warner Bros. Records; Released: May 5, 2006	Final album with the band before his second departure in 2009
Unlimited Love	Label: Warner Bros. Records; Released: April 1, 2022	First record since his second returning to the band in 2019. Recording for the album began in 2021.
Return of the Dream Canteen	Label: Warner Bros. Records; Released: October 14, 2022	

=== Live, compilation and other albums ===
Title	Album notes	Notes
What Hits!?	Label: EMI; Released: September 29, 1992	Frusciante plays guitar on songs "Higher Ground", "Knock Me Down", "Under the Bridge", "Show Me Your Soul", "Taste the Pain", "Johnny, Kick a Hole in the Sky"
Greatest Hits	Label: Warner Bros. Records; Released: November 11, 2003	Frusciante plays guitar on all songs except "My Friends"
Red Hot Chili Peppers Live in Hyde Park	Label: Warner Bros. Records; Released: July 26, 2004	First and only live album released by the Red Hot Chili Peppers
George Clinton and His Gangsters of Love	Label: Shanachie; Released: September 16, 2008	A cover album by George Clinton. Red Hot Chili Peppers are featured on the track "Let the Good Times Roll". This was the last song recorded with Frusciante prior to his 2009 departure from the band.
Rock & Roll Hall of Fame Covers EP	Label: Warner Bros. Records; Released: May 1, 2012	Digital-only release commemorating previous HoF inductees upon the 2012 induction of RHCP. John is featured on four of the six tracks.

== With The Mars Volta ==
=== Studio albums ===
Title	Album notes	Notes
De-Loused in the Comatorium	Label: GSL (GSL #75), Strummer, Universal (B#0000593-02); Released: June 24, 2003	Additional guitar and synthesizer treatment "Cicatriz ESP"
Frances the Mute	Label: GSL (GSL #96), Strummer, Universal (B#0004129-02); Released: March 1, 2005	First two guitar solos on "L'Via L'Viaquez"
Amputechture	Label: GSL (GSL #126), Universal (B#0007214-02); Released: September 12, 2006	Rhythm guitar, lead guitar, except on "Asilos Magdalena"
The Bedlam in Goliath	Label: Universal (B#0010617-02); Released: January 29, 2008	Guitar
Octahedron	Label: Warner Bros.; Released: June 23, 2009	Guitar
Lucro Sucio; Los Ojos del Vacío	Label: Clouds Hill; Released: April 11, 2025	Engineering

== With Omar Rodríguez-López ==
Title	Album notes	Notes
A Manual Dexterity: Soundtrack Volume One	Label: Gold Standard Laboratories; Released: August 31, 2004; Formats: CD, black 2LP, vinyl reissue (2023), digital	Minimoog on "Dyna Sark Arches" & "Here The Tame Go By"; Doepfer A-100 on "Here The Tame Go By"; Guitar on "Dramatic Theme" & "The Palpitations Form A Limit"
Se Dice Bisonte, No Búfalo	Label: GSL; Released: May 29, 2007; Formats: CD, brown marble LP, black LP, vinyl reissue (2023), digital	Guitars on "If Gravity Lulls, I Can Hear the World Pant"; Released the same day as Frusciante's AW II & Perry's Satellite Party
Calibration (Is Pushing Luck and Key Too Far)	Label: N2O Records; Released: December 15, 2007; Formats: CD, Grey marble 2LP, vinyl reissue (2023), digital	Vocals & lyrics on "Glosa Picaresca Wou Mên"
Omar Rodriguez Lopez & John Frusciante	Label: Sargent House, Rodriguez-Lopez Productions; Released: April 30, 2010; Formats: CD, black LP, translucent red LP, vinyl reissue (2023), digital	Guitars, bass, synthesizer; "0=2" & "0" were released on 7" single in 2005/2006 (see above)
Sepulcros de Miel	Label: Sargent House, Rodriguez-Lopez Productions; Released: May 30, 2010; Formats: Purple LP, orange LP, vinyl reissue (2023), digital	Guitars
Arañas en la Sombra	Label: Ipecac Recordings, ORL Projects; Released: August 26, 2016; Formats: digital, vinyl (2023)	Additional guitar on unspecified tracks; The Mars Volta sessions from various points between 2001 & 2012
Cell Phone Bikini	Label: Ipecac Recordings, ORL Projects; Released: October 7, 2016; Formats: digital, vinyl (2023)	Acoustic guitars on "Truth Binds Us"

== With Speed Dealer Moms ==
Title	Album notes	Notes
Speed Dealer Moms	Label: Planet Mu Records; Released: June 12, 2010 / TBA (reissue); Formats: LP, digital	A collaboration of experimental electronic music, between John Frusciante, Aaron Funk of Venetian Snares and Chris McDonald. They have released one eponymous EP so far."Speed Dealer Moms". Archived from the original on 2010-12-23.
SDM-LA8-441-114-211	Label: Evar Records; Released: June 18, 2021; Formats: LP, digital	Second EP by this trio after an 11 year absence, and the first of many planned releases on Frusciante's own Evar Records founded in 2020
Birth Control Pill	Label: Evar Records; Released: May 10, 2024; Formats: LP, digital	

== With Swahili Blonde ==
Title	Album notes	Notes
Man Meat	Label: Manimal Vinyl; Released: August 3, 2010; Formats: CD, black LP, digital	Experimental band led by John's ex-wife, Nicole Turley.; Guitar, backing vocals on "Red Money" (David Bowie/Carlos Alomar cover); Co-wrote "Tigress Ritual" with John Taylor
Psycho Tropical Ballet Pink	Label: Manimal Vinyl; Released: November 15, 2011; Formats: CD, blue LP, digital	Guitar
Covers EP	Label: Neurotic Yell Records; Released: March 16, 2012; Formats: Digital	Guitar, backing vocals on "Red Money"
Hiding in the Light	Label: Neurotic Yell Records; Released: March 4, 2014; Formats: Bandcamp digital download	A group of co-conspirators consisting of members of Swahili Blonde, Bosnian Rainbows, and Dante Vs Zombies including Nicole Turley, Dante White-Aliano, Laena Geronimo, Omar Rodriguez-Lopez, and Teri Gender Bender. Their debut is a digital 4-song EP on the Neurotic Yell bandcamp page."Kimono Kult". Archived from the original on 2014-01-11."Hiding In The Light EP".; Guitar on "La Vida Es Una Caja Hermosa" & "La Cancion De Alejandra"

== With Black Knights ==
Title	Album notes
Medieval Chamber	Label: Record Collection; Released: January 14, 2014; Producer of and collaborator on the second album by the Wu-Tang Clan affiliates
The Almighty	Label: Record Collection; Released: June 16, 2015; Producer of and collaborator on the third album by the Wu-Tang Clan affiliates; An instrumental version of the album was uploaded to Frusciante's bandcamp page on June 16, 2016
Excalibur	Label: BlackBall'D Entertainment; Released: March 5, 2017; Producer of and collaborator on the fourth album by the Wu-Tang Clan affiliates. This record concludes the trilogy completed by the group upon their initial writing/recording sessions.; An instrumental version of many of the album's songs were uploaded to Frusciante's soundcloud page on April 27, 2018
TBA	Label: BlackBall'D Entertainment; Released: TBA; Producer of and collaborator on the fifth album by the Wu-Tang Clan affiliates, this time with Warcloud rejoining

== Other contributions and guest appearances ==
Title	Album notes	Notes
Kristen Vigard (Kristen Vigard)	Label: Private Music; Released: August 21, 1990	Composition & guitar on "Slave to My Emotions"
Divine Love, Sex and Romance (Nina Hagen)	Label: Mercury; Released: June 22, 1991	Composition, production, guitar
Give Peace a Chance (Peace Choir)	Label: Virgin; Released: July 1, 1991	Guitar alongside Flea on bass. A compilation record put together by Lenny Kravitz.
Anytime at All (Banyan)	Label: CyberOctave; Released: February 23, 1999	Guitar on "Grease the System" and "La Sirena"; Flea also performs on "Grease the System", and there is a video of the "La Sirena" recording; Collective of nearly two dozen musicians led by Jane's Addiction drummer Stephen Perkins; John's first recording since his recovery in 1998
Rev (Perry Farrell)	Label: Warner Bros.; Released: November 11, 1999	Guitar on "Rev" along with Tom Morello & Stephen Perkins; Compilation record of Jane's Addiction, Porno For Pyros, and solo work
You Come and Go Like a Pop Song (The Bicycle Thief)	Label: Artemis, Musicrama, Goldenvoice; Released: September 21, 1999 / 2001 reissue	Guitar on "Cereal Song"; Only record to be released by Bob Forrest fronted band along with Josh Klinghoffer
Fishbone and the Familyhood Nextperience Present: The Psychotic Friends Nuttwerx (Fishbone)	Label: Hollywood Records; Released: March 21, 2000	"Shakey Ground" (The Temptations cover) along with Flea & Chad Smith
A System for Shutting Everything Out (Kevin Haskins & Doug DeAngelis)	Things Behind the Sun OST	Unreleased
Demos of Milla Jovovich		Guitar on "Bring It On"; Unreleased
Blowback (Tricky)	Label: ANTI-, Hollywood Records; Released: July 2, 2001	Guitar on "Girls" along with Anthony Kiedis; Guitar and vocals on "#1 Da Woman" along with Flea & Josh Klinghoffer
The Id (Macy Gray)	Label: Epic; Released: September 17, 2001	Guitar on "Sweet Baby" along with Erykah Badu
24 Hour Party People Soundtrack (Various)	Label: FFRR; Released: April 9, 2002	Guitar on "New Dawn Fades" (Joy Division cover) along with Moby and Billy Corgan
American IV: The Man Comes Around (Johnny Cash)	Label: American Recordings, Universal; Released: November 5, 2002	Guitar on "Personal Jesus" (Depeche Mode cover); Guitar on "We'll Meet Again" (Ross Parker, Hughie Charles)
We're a Happy Family: A Tribute to Ramones (Various)	Label: Columbia; Released: February 11, 2003	Guitar on "Today Your Love, Tomorrow the World" and also on "Havana Affair" along with Red Hot Chili Peppers (Ramones covers); Recorded: 2000–2002 during By the Way sessions
Dragonfly (Ziggy Marley)	Label: Private Music; Released: April 15, 2003	Guitar on "Rainbow in the Sky" along with Flea
Underworld OST (Various)	Label: Lakeshore; Released: September 2, 2003	Guitar on "Bring Me the Disco King" (David Bowie cover, Danny Lohner remix) along with Maynard James Keenan, Milla Jovovich, and Josh Freese
Unearthed (Johnny Cash)	Label: American Recordings, Universal; Released: November 25, 2003	Guitar on "Heart of Gold" (Neil Young cover) along with Flea and Chad Smith
Tempo Technik Teamwork (Ekkehard Ehlers)	Label: Staubgold Germany; Released: October 19, 2004	Guitar on "Grisaisse 1"
The Word Is Live (Yes)	Label: Rhino; Released: August 23, 2005	Liner notes
Music for the Divine (Glenn Hughes)	Label: Frontiers Records (Europe), Yamaha (Japan); Demolition Records (US), Sony BMG (Australia); Released: June 9, 2006	Guitar and backing vocals on "Nights in White Satin" (The Moody Blues cover); Guitar on "This Is How I Feel"; Entire album performed and produced by Chad Smith
Modern Folk and Blues: Wednesday (Bob Forrest)	Label: Lakeshore; Released: September 19, 2006	Guitar and backing vocals on "Dying Song" (his own song from The Brown Bunny OST); Guitar contributions on other tracks
Samurai Workout	DVD by John's stepfather with some guitar tracks	
Ultra Payloaded (Satellite Party)	Label: Columbia; Released: May 29, 2007; Formats: CD, digital download	Guitar on "Hard Life Easy" along with Flea; Released the same day as Frusciante's own AW II and Omar's Bisonte
The Dub Room Special (Frank Zappa)	Label: Zappa; Released: August 24, 2007	Liner notes for soundtrack of the film
Hourglass (Dave Gahan (Depeche Mode singer))	Label: Mute, Virgin; Released: October 22, 2007	Guitar on "Saw Something"
8 Diagrams (Wu-Tang Clan)	Released December 11, 2007; Formats: CD, vinyl, digital download	Guitar on "The Heart Gently Weeps" (George Harrison interpolation) along with RZA, George Drakoulias, Erykah Badu, and Dhani Harrison
Digi Snacks (RZA)	Released June 24, 2008; Formats: CD, vinyl (2022), digital download	Guitar and co-production on "Up Again" along with George Clinton and Kinetic 9; Guitar on "You Can't Stop Me Now"
George Clinton and His Gangsters of Love (George Clinton)	Label: Shanachie; Released September 16, 2008; Formats: CD	Guitar on "Let the Good Times Roll" along with RHCP; The last song Frusciante recorded as a member of the Red Hot Chili Peppers until 2019
The Spirit of Apollo (N.A.S.A. (North America/South America))	Label: ANTI-; Released: February 17, 2009	Guitar on "Way Down" along with RZA & Barbie Hatch
Exquisite Corpse (Warpaint)	Label: Manimal; Released 2008 (self release) October 6, 2009 (large release); Formats: CD, digital download	Mixed; Mellotron on "Billie Holiday" (Josh plays drums)
Vol. 1 (VAGENDA / Nicole Turley)	Label: Neurotic Yell Records; Released May 12, 2012; Formats: Bandcamp digital download	Guitar on "I Wanta Go"; Guitar on "The Golden Corale" along with Viv Albertine (Swahili Blonde remix)
DOXXOLOGY (BIG DOXX (Kehinde "Doxx" Cunningham & Nicole Turley))	Label: Neurotic Yell Records; Released: December 12, 2012	Guitar on "Indigenous Rhythm"
You're the Father of My Songs (Amanda Jo Williams)	Label: Neurotic Yell Records; Released May 21, 2013; Formats: 12-inch vinyl, digital download	Piano, organ
Vol. 2 (VAGENDA / Nicole Turley)	Label: Neurotic Yell Records; Released: November 21, 2013	Guitar on "H (heart) H" (WEAVE! remix); Original WEAVE! EP, New Funk Romance, released July 24, 2012
Pleasure Pyramid (Sexual Castle (Ivory Lee Carlson & Nicole Turley))	Label: Neurotic Yell Records; Released: TBA April 20, 2014 (demos)	Guitar on "Flip The Scrip"
Paper Gods (Duran Duran)	Label: Warner Bros.; Released: September 11, 2015; Formats: 12-inch vinyl, CD, digital download	Group's 14th studio album; Guitar on "What Are the Chances?", "Butterfly Girl", "The Universe Alone"; Guitar on "Northern Lights" (Deluxe version)
A Raw Youth (Le Butcherettes)	Label: Ipecac; Released: September 18, 2015; Formats: 12-inch vinyl, CD, digital download	Group's third full-length, produced by Omar; Guitar and synth bass on "My Half"
Mahandini (Dewa Budjana)	Label: Dawaiku Records; Released: December 10, 2018; Formats: 12-inch vinyl, CD, cassette, digital download	Guitar and vocals on reworked versions of Frusciante's "Crowded" and "Zone" from Enclosure album
The Problem Of Leisure (Various artists)	Label: TBA; Released: June 18, 2021	Album celebrating Gang of Four and guitarist Andy Gill, who died on February 1, 2020.; Guitar along with Flea and the Silverlake Conservatory of Music choir on a track, possibly the first to-be-released recording since John's return to RHCP
Honora (Flea)	Label: Nonesuch Records; Released: March 27, 2026	Flea's full-length debut album; John is credited with treatments on "Frailed" & "Willow Weep for Me"
The Album (AcHoZeN)	Label: urSESSION; Released: TBA	Project comprising Shavo Odadjian (vocals, guitar), RZA (vocals, keyboards, samples, beats, guitar), Kinetic 9 (vocals), Reverend William Burke (vocals)

== DVDs and videos ==
=== Solo music videos ===
Year	Title	Director(s)
1997	"Life's a Bath"	M. Polish
2001	"Going Inside"	Vincent Gallo
2005	"The Past Recedes"	Mike Piscitelli
2020	"Brand E"	Amalia Irons

Additionally, the entirety of John Frusciante's album To Record Only Water for Ten Days was made into a series of short experimental films directed by Vincent Gallo in 2001. This film was never given any official release, though the videos were shown on MTV2.

=== Red Hot Chili Peppers ===
==== DVDs ====
Title	Album notes
Funky Monks	Distributed by: Warner Bros. Records; Directed by Gavin Bowden; Formats: VHS and DVD
Off the Map	Distributed by: Warner Bros. Records; Compiled and directed by Dick Rude; Formats: VHS and DVD
Live at Slane Castle	Distributed by: Warner Bros. Records; Released: November 17, 2003; Directed by Nick Wickham; recorded at Slane Castle, County Meath, Ireland on August 23, 2003; Formats: DVD and UMD

==== Music videos ====
Year	Title	Director(s)
1989	"Higher Ground"	Drew Carolan
1989	"Knock Me Down"	Drew Carolan
1990	"Taste the Pain"	Tom Stern and Alex Winter
1990	"Show Me Your Soul"	Bill Stobaugh
1991	"Give It Away"	Stéphane Sednaoui
1992	"Under the Bridge"	Gus Van Sant
1992	"Suck My Kiss"	Compilation footage from Gavin Bowden
1999	"Scar Tissue"	Stéphane Sednaoui
1999	"Around the World"	Stéphane Sednaoui
2000	"Otherside"	Jonathan Dayton and Valerie Faris
2000	"Californication"	Jonathan Dayton and Valerie Faris
2000	"Road Trippin'"	Jonathan Dayton and Valerie Faris
2002	"By the Way"	Jonathan Dayton and Valerie Faris
2002	"The Zephyr Song"	Jonathan Dayton and Valerie Faris
2003	"Can't Stop"	Mark Romanek
2003	"Universally Speaking"	Dick Rude
2003	"Fortune Faded"	Laurent Briet
2006	"Dani California"	Tony Kaye
2006	"Tell Me Baby"	Jonathan Dayton and Valerie Faris
2006	"Snow ((Hey Oh))"	Nick Wickham
2007	"Desecration Smile"	Gus Van Sant
2007	"Hump de Bump"	Chris Rock
2022	"Black Summer"	Deborah Chow
2022	"These Are the Ways"	Malia James
2022	"Tippa My Tongue"	Malia James
2022	"The Drummer"	Philip R Lopez
