= I and II =

- Cover of I

Studio album by John Frusciante
- Released: February 3, 2023
- Recorded: 2022
- Genres: Ambient, drone
- Label: Avenue 66 (Acid Test)
- Producer: John Frusciante

John Frusciante solo chronology
Maya (2020)	I and II (2023)	High Low (2026)

Alternative cover
- Cover of II

John Frusciante chronology
SDM-LA8-441-114-211 (2021)	I and II (2023)	Birth Control Pill (2024)

I and II (pronounced "one" and "two", stylized as . I : and : I I .) are the twelfth and thirteenth studio albums by American musician John Frusciante. Both albums were released on February 3, 2023, through Avenue 66 (Acid Test Records). I is a vinyl-only release containing seven tracks, while II is a digital and CD release featuring more material. Frusciante stated that the former album would include an exclusive track and that the lack of certain material is due to the fact that certain material on II contains "sounds that can not be pressed on vinyl".

Frusciante said the albums contrasted with the structured rock songs he contributed to while working on the Red Hot Chili Peppers albums Unlimited Love and Return of the Dream Canteen (both released in 2022), stating that "After a year and a half writing and recording rock music, I needed to clear my head. I listened to and made music where things generally happen gradually rather than suddenly."

Frusciante primarily used analog-style synthesizers for the making of the album, such as the Elektron Monomachine and Analog Four MK II. Among the artists and pieces listed as influences over the album were Jimi Hendrix's "...And the Gods Made Love" and the ambient music of Brian Eno.

== Track listings ==
All songs written by John Frusciante.

=== I ===
Side one
No.	Title	Length
1.	"Clank"	11:02
2.	"Sluice"	6:00

Side two
No.	Title	Length
1.	"Firpln"	13:35
Total length:		30:37

Side three
No.	Title	Length
1.	"Unitiled"	7:32
2.	"OFD"	2:40

Side four
No.	Title	Length
1.	"Pyn"	5:56
2.	"MK 2.1"	7:12
Total length:		23:20

=== II ===
Disc one
No.	Title	Length
1.	"Golpin"	12:12
2.	"MK 2.1"	7:17
3.	"Pyn"	6:03
4.	"Blesdub Dot"	16:18
5.	"Unitiled"	7:38
Total length:		49:27

Disc two
No.	Title	Length
1.	"Clank"	11:02
2.	"Frantay"	16:24
3.	"Galvation"	6:31
4.	"Sluice"	6:00
5.	"Firpln"	13:49
Total length:		53:45
