= Look Down, See Us =

EP by Trickfinger
- Released: March 29, 2020
- Recorded: 2018
- Genre: Acid house; IDM; Electro
- Length: 18:47
- Label: Evar Records
- Producer: John Frusciante

Trickfinger chronology
Trickfinger II (2017)	Look Down, See Us (2020)	She Smiles Because She Presses the Button (2020)

John Frusciante chronology
Foregrow (2016)	Look Down, See Us (2020)	Maya (2020)

Look Down, See Us is the second EP by Trickfinger, the alias of musician John Frusciante, released March 29, 2020 at the launch of the Evar Records label. The four songs were recorded more recently than the first two full-length Trickfinger albums.

== Background ==
Like its predecessors, the Red Hot Chili Peppers guitarist recorded the music for Look Down, See Us on his own. On his fourth release as Trickfinger, John Frusciante celebrates the launch of a new record company alongside Marcia Pinna. Look Down, See Us is only available as a digital download.

== Track listing ==
All tracks are written by Trickfinger.

No.	Title	Length
1.	"GR 8"	3:27
2.	"Meaning To"	5:02
3.	"Cymm Trace"	4:44
4.	"Look Down, See Us"	5:34
Total length:		18:47
