= She Smiles Because She Presses the Button =

Studio album by Trickfinger
- Released: June 5, 2020
- Recorded: 2018
- Genre: Acid house; IDM; Electro
- Length: 27:23
- Label: Avenue 66 / Acid Test
- Producer: John Frusciante

Trickfinger chronology
Look Down, See Us (2020)	She Smiles Because She Presses the Button (2020)	High Low (2026)

John Frusciante chronology
Foregrow (2016)	She Smiles Because She Presses the Button (2020)	Maya (2020)

She Smiles Because She Presses the Button is the third studio album by Trickfinger, the alias of musician John Frusciante, released on June 5, 2020, through Acid Test's Avenue 66 sub-label.

On April 16, the first two tracks were uploaded to the Acid Test bandcamp page for streaming and pre-order bonus.

== Background ==
Like previous releases under the Trickfinger alias, Frusciante recorded She Smiles Because She Presses the Button in its entirety, without the involvement of any additional personnel. The fifth Trickfinger release, the album is a continuation of Frusciante's exploration of electronic music which had begun in 2007 after he "lost interest in traditional songwriting" shortly before leaving the Red Hot Chili Peppers for the second time, and comprised the bulk of his musical output during his decade away from the band.

She Smiles Because She Presses the Button was made available on vinyl, CD and as a digital download. A second small run LP pressing was done soon after the release day as the initial pressing had run out.

== Track listing ==
All tracks are written by Trickfinger.

No.	Title	Length
1.	"Amb"	4:04
2.	"Brise"	5:30
3.	"Noice"	4:05
4.	"Plane"	4:25
5.	"Rhyme Four"	4:12
6.	"Sea YX6"	4:51
Total length:		27:07
