= Rotation (John Frusciante album) =

Studio album by Trickfinger
- Released: July 10, 2026
- Recorded: 2024–2025
- Studio: John Frusciante's home studio, Los Angeles
- Genre: electronica; IDM; drill 'n' bass; jungle; breakbeat
- Length: 28:54
- Label: AcidTest (Absurd Recordings)
- Producer: John Frusciante

Trickfinger chronology
High Low (2026)	Rotation (2026)

John Frusciante solo chronology
I and II (2023)	Rotation (2026)

Professional ratings
Review scores
Source	Rating

Rotation is an album by American musician John Frusciante, his fifth full-length under the Trickfinger alias, released on July 10, 2026 through AcidTest (Absurd Recordings). The album was released digitally and within a limited-edition 5LP vinyl boxset, In A Box.

On May 20, 2026, "Tysch" was uploaded to streaming and as a pre-order bonus.

Upon announcement of the Trickfinger In A Box set, John wrote, "The fourth record in this box is me breaking in a new mixing console, making live-to-stereo music. The record is called Rotation, and it is all new music. These tracks are more in the “not trying” category, since we're on that subject. I had just come home from tour, and was just really glad to be in the studio with my machines." The "not trying" aspect of a songwriting approach he earlier mentioned describing the first two LPs within the boxset, 2015's Trickfinger & 2017's Trickfinger II, both recorded nearly 20 years ago soon after John's 2000s touring with the Red Hot Chili Peppers concluded in 2007.

== Track listing ==
=== Rotation ===
Side one
No.	Title	Length
1.	"Tysch"	5:56
2.	"Crane"	5:16
3.	"Now P-PL"	3:12
Total length:		14:24

Side two
No.	Title	Length
1.	"Talking SH-7"	5:32
2.	"Rotation Of Weight"	8:58
Total length:		14:30
