= Estrus (disambiguation) =

Estrus is the phase when the female of a species is sexually receptive.

Estrus may also refer to:

- Estrus Records, an independent record label from Bellingham, Washington
- Estrus EP, an EP by John Frusciante
- Estrus (album), 2026 album by Tove Lo
