= Poster Child (song) =

Promotional single by Red Hot Chili Peppers

from the album Unlimited Love
- Released: March 4, 2022
- Studio: Shangri-La (Malibu, California)
- Genre: Funkadelia
- Length: 5:16
- Label: Warner
- Songwriters: Flea; John Frusciante; Anthony Kiedis; Chad Smith
- Producer: Rick Rubin

Music video
- "Poster Child" on YouTube

"Poster Child" is a song by American rock band Red Hot Chili Peppers. It was released as a promotional single on March 4, 2022, taken from the band's twelfth studio album, Unlimited Love.

While not considered a proper single for radio airplay, the band released an animated music video for the song that was directed by Julien & Thami with the animation provided by Julien Calemard, Thami Nabil and Hedi Nabil. The song was leaked online on March 3, 2022.

== Composition ==
In contrast to the previous single "Black Summer," "Poster Child" exhibits a more funk rock sound. At NME, Alex Gallagher described the song as being "even more groove-heavy instrumental than usual." Lyrically, the song makes numerous cultural references and name-checks several musicians including Duran Duran, Richard Hell, Adam Ant, Led Zeppelin, Thin Lizzy, Van Morrison and MC5.

== Personnel ==
- Anthony Kiedis - lead vocals;
- John Frusciante - guitar, backing vocals; additional keyboards;
- Flea - bass guitar;
- Chad Smith - drums, tambourine;

== Critical reception ==
Robin Murray at Clash Music gave the song a positive review, stating "'Poster Child' is the dream tune for Chili Pepper fans, both stylistically and lyrically encapsulating the funkadelic energy of the band whilst inviting listeners to reminisce over poster children and those who have shaped pop culture throughout the 20th century."

== Charts ==
Chart performance for "Poster Child"
Chart (2022)	Peak position
Japan Hot Overseas (Billboard)	16
New Zealand Hot Singles (RMNZ)	18
UK Singles Sales (OCC)	75
UK Singles Downloads (Official Charts)	74
US Hot Rock & Alternative Songs (Billboard)	29
