= To Record Only Water for Ten Days =

Studio album by John Frusciante
- Released: February 13, 2001
- Recorded: November 1999 – April 2000
- Genre: Experimental rock, art rock, new wave, synthpop, psychedelic rock, lo-fi
- Length: 42:20
- Label: Warner Bros.
- Producer: John Frusciante

John Frusciante chronology
Smile from the Streets You Hold (1997)	To Record Only Water for Ten Days (2001)	Going Inside (2001)

Professional ratings
Aggregate scores
Source	Rating
Metacritic	66/100
Review scores
Source	Rating
AllMusic	4/5 stars
Entertainment Weekly	B+
Dotmusic	3/5 stars
NME	7/10
Pitchfork	8.0/10
Rolling Stone	3/5 stars
The Rolling Stone Album Guide	2/5 stars

To Record Only Water for Ten Days is the third studio album by American musician John Frusciante, released on February 13, 2001 on Warner Music Group. Unlike his previous two solo albums, Niandra LaDes and Usually Just a T Shirt (1994) and Smile from the Streets You Hold (1997), the record differs significantly in that Frusciante explores elements of electronica, synthpop and new wave.

== Background ==
Following a month in rehab for his heroin addiction and his rejoining the Red Hot Chili Peppers, Frusciante felt deeply connected to the spiritual plane and was inspired by the many visions he had of spirits; the ideology of recording water for ten days refers to ten separate periods of time in which an album is conceived. In an interview he explained that the title comes from a symbolic picture of his body being a tape recorder that records the water for ten days as a way to take his "chemical makeup" off, in order to make a possible representation of the feelings and places he wanted to represent through music. Frusciante was encouraged to record the album by producer Jimmy Boyle who had helped him overcome his addiction. The lyrics express this theme and deal mostly with philosophical and spiritual matters as well as delving into his usual brand of psychedelia-tinged personalism.

The album was influenced by the English electronic bands Depeche Mode, New Order and Orchestral Manoeuvres in the Dark.

== Recording ==
Frusciante recorded the album after kicking his addiction to heroin. As with his first two albums, Niandra Lades and Usually Just a T-Shirt and Smile from the Streets You Hold, Frusciante recorded this album at home. But while he had taken a conspicuously lo-fi approach on the earlier albums, using a 4-track cassette recorder and even a boombox, he produced To Record Only Water for Ten Days in much higher fidelity. Frusciante switched to a Yamaha MD8 – a digital 8-track recorder that used Minidisc technology – to record the raw tracks, which he later transferred to analog tape for further individual track equalization. All guitars were recorded direct-in without amplification.

Contrary to the title of the album, it took longer than ten days to record: according to Frusciante, he spent up to three days on each song.

Frusciante admitted his frustration with digital recording during the making of the album and has since felt inclined towards recording his albums with analog equipment. "When we came to mix that record, I realized how bad it sounded. After that album, I vowed that I wasn't going to record anything on digital anymore."

== Release ==
WMG released the album on February 13, 2001. It charted at No. 30 on Heatseekers. Vincent Gallo directed a video for every track on the record.

In 2017, the Australian label Twelve Suns rereleased the album on vinyl in a limited edition of 1500 copies. The album was re-issued for Record Store Day 2026 with a limited vinyl pressing of 3000 copies of 'cobalt and orange' coloured records. The re-issue was considered one of the most highly sought after Record Store Day releases that year.

== In other media ==
"Murderers" is featured in the "Invisible Boards" segment of the skateboarding home video Yeah Right!. The track "Remain" features on episode 18 of the hit Fox series 24.

== Track listing ==
All tracks are written by John Frusciante.

No.	Title	Length
1.	"Going Inside"	3:36
2.	"Someone's"	1:52
3.	"The First Season"	4:13
4.	"Wind Up Space"	1:59
5.	"Away & Anywhere"	4:09
6.	"Remain"	3:57
7.	"Fallout"	2:10
8.	"Ramparts"	1:11
9.	"With No One"	3:32
10.	"Murderers"	2:41
11.	"Invisible Movement"	2:21
12.	"Representing"	1:46
13.	"In Rime"	2:13
14.	"Saturation"	3:03
15.	"Moments Have You"	3:30
Total length:		42:20

Japanese Bonus Track
No.	Title	Length
16.	"Resolution"	2:46
Total length:		45:05

== Non-album tracks ==
Dozens of songs were recorded for the album but left off. The following have been released in some form. Many of these tracks have been released on Frusciante's first internet album, From The Sounds Inside.

All tracks are written by John Frusciante. Most digital releases and unofficial released tracks were not titled by Frusciante, but by fans. The official titles are unknown and most tracks remain unfinished or unmixed.

Officially released B-sides and non-album tracks
No.	Title	Length
1.	"Beginning Again" (released on the Going Inside EP and re-released on From the Sounds Inside)
2.	"Leave All the Days Behind" (also titled "Cut Myself Out" and later released on The Brown Bunny soundtrack and From the Sounds Inside as "Leave All the Days Behind")
3.	"Resolution" (Japanese bonus track for To Record Only Water for Ten Days)
4.	"So Would Have I" (also titled "So Would've I" and later released on From the Sounds Inside)
5.	"Time Is Nothing" (released on the Going Inside EP)
6.	"The Last Hymn" (released on the Going Inside EP)
7.	"Falling" (later released on The Brown Bunny soundtrack)
8.	"Forever Away" (later released on The Brown Bunny soundtrack)
9.	"Dying Song" (later released on The Brown Bunny soundtrack)
10.	"Prostitution Song" (later released on The Brown Bunny soundtrack)

Digital releases
No.	Title	Length
1.	"Beginning Again" (Rough Mix)
2.	"Dying (I Don't Mind)" (later released on From the Sounds Inside)
3.	"Fallout" (Alternate Version)
4.	"How High" (later released on From the Sounds Inside)
5.	"Interstate Sex" (later released on From the Sounds Inside)
6.	"I Go Through These Walls" (later released on From the Sounds Inside)
7.	"I Will Always Be Beat Down" (also titled "Beat Down" and later released on From the Sounds Inside as "I Will Always Be Beat Down")
8.	"Leaving You" (later released on From the Sounds Inside)
9.	"Murmur" (titled "Wind Up Space" on To Record Only Water for Ten Days and titled "Murmur" on From the Sounds Inside)
10.	"Nature Falls" (later released on From the Sounds Inside)
11.	"Place to Drive" (later released on From the Sounds Inside)
12.	"Low Birds" (also titled "Purity", "Lou Bergs", and "Penetrate Time" and released on From the Sounds Inside as "Penetrate Time")
13.	"Sailing Outdoors" (later released on From the Sounds Inside)
14.	"Saturation" (Rough Mix)
15.	"Slow Down" (later released on From the Sounds Inside)
16.	"So Would Have I" (Rough Mix)
17.	"The Battle of Time" (later released on From the Sounds Inside)
18.	"Three Thoughts" (later released on From the Sounds Inside)
19.	"With Love" (later released on From the Sounds Inside)

Unofficially released rough mixes
No.	Title	Length
1.	"Moments Have You" (Rough Mix)
2.	"Representing" (Rough Mix)
3.	"Resolution" (Rough Mix)
4.	"The First Season" (Rough Mix)
5.	"Time Is Nothing" (Rough Mix)
6.	"Someone's" (Rough Mix)
7.	"Wind Up Space" (Rough Mix)
8.	"With No One" (Rough Mix)

Unofficially released tracks
No.	Title	Length
1.	"All We Have"
2.	"Back and Forth (to the Sun)"
3.	"Drift Down"
4.	"Every Light Will Burn"
5.	"Fill My Nights"
6.	"Instrumental"
7.	"Untitled 2000"
8.	"Samurai Theme"
9.	"Song for Toni"

== Personnel ==
- John Frusciante – vocals, electric guitar, acoustic guitar, synthesizer, drum machine, producer
- Lawrence Azerrad – design, art assistant
- Jimmy Boyle – mixing and production
- Vladimir Meller – mastering

== Charts ==
Chart (2001)	Peak position
Finnish Albums (Suomen virallinen lista)	28

Chart (2026)	Peak position
Croatian International Albums (HDU)	14
Greek Albums (IFPI)	72
Hungarian Physical Albums (MAHASZ)	10
Scottish Albums (OCC)	40
Swedish Physical Albums (Sverigetopplistan)	17
UK Albums Sales (OCC)	76
