= Maya (John Frusciante album) =

Studio album by John Frusciante
- Released: October 23, 2020
- Recorded: 2018
- Studio: John Frusciante's home studio, Los Angeles
- Genre: electronica; IDM; drill 'n' bass; jungle; breakbeat
- Length: 40:56
- Label: Timesig, Planet Mu
- Producer: John Frusciante

John Frusciante chronology
She Smiles Because She Presses the Button (2020)	Maya (2020)	SDM-LA8-441-114-211 (2021)

John Frusciante solo chronology
Foregrow (2016)	Maya (2020)	I and II (2023)

Professional ratings
Aggregate scores
Source	Rating
Metacritic	80/100
Review scores
Source	Rating
AllMusic	4/5 stars
Clash	8/10
Exclaim!	8/10
Loud and Quiet	6/10
Pitchfork	7.6/10

Maya is the eleventh studio album by American musician John Frusciante, released on October 23, 2020, through Timesig, a label owned by Venetian Snares. The album was released as a digital album, on limited-edition vinyl and compact disc, and is the first full-length instrumental electronic album for Frusciante to be released under his own name. The LP went on to have another pressing on lilac purple vinyl in March 2021.

On August 31, 2020, "Amethblowl" was uploaded to Frusciante's Bandcamp page for streaming and as a pre-order bonus.

== Background and recording ==
The album is dedicated to Frusciante's cat Maya, who died earlier in the year. Frusciante stated: "Maya was with me as I made music for 15 years, so I wanted to name it after her. She loved music, and with such a personal title, it didn't seem right to call myself Trickfinger, somehow, so it's by John Frusciante. I don't have that interest in singing or writing lyrics like I used to. The natural thing when I'm by myself now, is to just make music like the stuff being released this year. I really love the back and forth with machines and the computer."

== Track listing ==
Maya track listing
No.	Title	Length
1.	"Brand E"	4:52
2.	"Usbrup Pensul"	4:24
3.	"Flying"	3:43
4.	"Pleasure Explanation"	4:15
5.	"Blind Aim"	4:07
6.	"Reach Out"	4:23
7.	"Amethblowl"	4:40
8.	"Zillion"	4:35
9.	"Anja Motherless"	5:57
Total length:		40:56
