= 4-Track Guitar Music =

EP by John Frusciante
- Released: November 24, 2015
- Recorded: May 2010
- Genre: Experimental rock
- Length: 19:00
- Label: Self-released on Bandcamp and SoundCloud
- Producer: John Frusciante

John Frusciante chronology
Trickfinger (2015)	4-Track Guitar Music (2015)	Renoise Tracks 2009–2011 (2015)

John Frusciante EP chronology
Letur-Lefr EP (2012)	4-Track Guitar Music EP (2015)	Foregrow EP (2016)

4-Track Guitar Music is the sixth overall and first internet EP by John Frusciante, released on November 24, 2015, onto his Bandcamp and SoundCloud. 4-Track Guitar Music was also released the same day and year as Renoise Tracks 2009–2011, his first internet album since 2001's From the Sounds Inside.

== Recording ==
4-Track Guitar Music was recorded in May 2010. It is an instrumental EP. The recording of the EP took place while Frusciante was taking a full electronic direction of his music, saying this possibly with the release of his fifth EP, Letur-Lefr, and stating this definitely with his ninth studio album, PBX Funicular Intaglio Zone, and later albums and projects.

Frusciante said, at the release of the EP on his SoundCloud, 4-Track Guitar Music was "recorded on a 4-track cassette in May 2010, the instrumentation being 3 guitars and one drum machine. It is a bunch of weird anti-rock star guitar solos, played mainly on a Mosrite Ventures guitar, and a Yamaha SG, accompanied by an Elektron Machinedrum, excepting one song where I used a Roland TR 707, and another where a 707 was used, but is not in the mix."

== Track listing ==
No.	Title	Length
1.	"Untitled 1" (Mix 3 !!)	1:54
2.	"Untitled 2" (Mix 4 – loud guitars !!)	3:25
3.	"Untitled 3" (Mix 2 !!)	2:55
4.	"Untitled 4" (Mix 4 !!)	4:38
5.	"Untitled 5" (Mix 2 !!)	3:14
6.	"Venice May 1" (Mix 4)	2:48
Total length:		19:00

== Personnel ==
- John Frusciante – all instruments, engineering, mixing, mastering, producing
- Aura T-09 – cover art, design
