= Smile from the Streets You Hold =

Studio album by John Frusciante
- Released: August 26, 1997
- Recorded: 1988, 1991–1994, 1996
- Studio: Various locations
- Genres: Lo-fi; collage
- Length: 61:23
- Label: Birdman
- Producer: John Frusciante

John Frusciante chronology
Estrus (1997)	Smile from the Streets You Hold (1997)	To Record Only Water for Ten Days (2001)

Smile from the Streets You Hold is the second studio album by American musician John Frusciante. It was released on August 26, 1997, on Birdman Records, while Frusciante was addicted to drugs and was no longer performing with Red Hot Chili Peppers. The record is an amalgamation of songs from various periods of time, mainly extras not included on Frusciante's debut Niandra Lades and Usually Just a T-Shirt (1994); included, however, are several tracks recorded in 1993, 1994, 1996 and "A Fall Thru the Ground" from 1988.

== Recording ==
Many songs from Smile from the Streets You Hold were recorded when Frusciante was still with the Chili Peppers and are from the same period as his previous solo album, Niandra Lades and Usually Just a T-Shirt. One of the earliest songs to be recorded is "A Fall Thru the Ground", which was recorded in 1988.

In a 1997 interview with Guitar Player, Frusciante claimed to have maintained active communication with the spirit world during the album's recording phase:

The title song was a very intense moment, because I was having verbal communication with the spirits while I was recording; and I started crying at the end of it. The spirits give you ideas for things, and what's important to them is what's important to me. I'm much more concerned with my fame in their world than with my fame in this one. That's why it's been difficult for me to adjust to being alive at all.

Actor River Phoenix, a good friend of Frusciante and the rest of the Chili Peppers, is posthumously featured on two tracks, "Height Down" (originally titled "Soul Removal"), and "Well, I've Been" (originally titled "Bought Her Soul"). Both songs were supposed to be released on Niandra LaDes and Usually Just a T-Shirt, but were pulled by request of Phoenix's family after Phoenix's death.

"Life's a Bath" was recorded in late 1993 while Frusciante was living in a rental home after his former house was damaged in a fire. The previously mentioned "Height Down" and "Well, I've Been" were recorded in spring 1993 at Frusciante's former home.

"I May Again Know John", "Enter a Uh", "Nigger Song" and the second part of "Smile From the Streets You Hold" were recorded in late 1994 while Frusciante was living in New York City.

"More", "I Can't See Until I See Your Eyes", and "Estress" were recorded to a cassette on a boombox in 1996. Frusciante's poor health is apparent in his voice.

== Release ==
Frusciante had Smile from the Streets You Hold and Niandra Lades and Usually Just a T-Shirt removed from record stores in 1998 after rejoining the Red Hot Chili Peppers because he felt uncomfortable with them being available to the public. He is quoted as saying that he released Smile from the Streets You Hold for drug money. Niandra Lades was eventually re-issued and in the early 2000s, Frusciante stated he will one day re-release Smile from the Streets You Hold.

There is also a second print of Smile from the Streets You Hold available. The songs on the second print are much lower in sound quality and have frequent hiss and hum, most notable in "Nigger Song", which obscures the recording somewhat. It has been speculated that the original release had had the recordings professionally mastered, but the second release used Frusciante's untampered tapes by mistake.

The title song "Smile from the Streets You Hold", is split in two separate tracks. During a 2001 solo performance, Frusciante said the song was about a friend, with the first half written while the person was alive and the second part being written after their death. Fans have speculated that the song may be about River Phoenix, although this has never been confirmed.

The second print also includes an extended version of "Life's a Bath". Another notable difference between the 17-track version and the 18-track version is that on the former, John can be heard taking a hit from a bong on "For Air".

== Reception ==
Professional ratings
Review scores
Source	Rating
AllMusic	3/5 stars
Pitchfork	0.0/10
The Rolling Stone Album Guide	1.5/5 stars

Reviewing the album for Pitchfork, James Wisdom wrote: "Smile For The Streets You Hold would easily have to be the easiest CD to hate that I've ever heard, but hidden between the disturbingly twisted and tortured vocals there are a few gems ... It's fringe – way, way out there. I'm giving it a 0% because you'll have to call this one on your own, sorry."

== Track listing ==
All tracks are written by John Frusciante, unless noted.

No.	Title	Writer(s)	Length
1.	"Enter a Uh"		8:06
2.	"The Other"		1:36
3.	"Life's a Bath"		1:18
4.	"A Fall Thru the Ground"		2:24
5.	"Poppy Man"		1:21
6.	"I May Again Know John"		8:47
7.	"I'm Always"		2:33
8.	"Nigger Song"		4:15
9.	"Femininity"		2:35
10.	"Breathe"		6:21
11.	"More"		2:07
12.	"For Air"		3:55
13.	"Height Down"	John Frusciante, River Phoenix	4:00
14.	"Well, I've Been"	Frusciante, Phoenix	3:06
15.	"Smile from the Streets You Hold"		5:09
16.	"I Can't See Until I See Your Eyes"		1:30
17.	"Estress" (titled "Estrus" on the Estrus EP)		2:17
Total length:			61:23

18-track version
No.	Title	Writer(s)	Length
1.	"Enter a Uh"		8:09
2.	"The Other"		1:36
3.	"Life's a Bath"		1:39
4.	"A Fall Thru the Ground"		2:20
5.	"Poppy Man"		1:16
6.	"I May Again Know John"		8:48
7.	"I'm Always"		2:33
8.	"Nigger Song"		4:15
9.	"Femininity"		2:34
10.	"Breathe"		6:12
11.	"More"		2:08
12.	"For Air"		2:57
13.	"Height Down"	Frusciante, Phoenix	3:52
14.	"Well, I've Been"	Frusciante, Phoenix	3:07
15.	"Smile from the Streets You Hold" (Part 1)		4:09
16.	"Smile from the Streets You Hold" (Part 2)		0:56
17.	"I Can't See Until I See Your Eyes"		1:30
18.	"Estress" (titled "Estrus" on the Estrus EP)		2:20
Total length:			61:23
