= These Are the Ways =

Single by Red Hot Chili Peppers

from the album Unlimited Love
- Released: March 31, 2022
- Studio: Shangri-La (Malibu, California)
- Genre: Alternative rock; hard rock
- Length: 3:56
- Label: Warner
- Songwriters: Flea; John Frusciante; Anthony Kiedis; Chad Smith
- Producer: Rick Rubin

Red Hot Chili Peppers singles chronology
| "Black Summer" (2022) | "These Are the Ways" (2022) | "Tippa My Tongue" (2022) |

Music video
- "These Are The Ways" on YouTube

"These Are the Ways" is a song by American rock band Red Hot Chili Peppers that was released on March 31, 2022, and is the second single from their twelfth studio album, Unlimited Love.

== Music video ==
A music video was released simultaneously with the single, directed by Malia James and with the participation of Dina Shihabi. The video finds Anthony Kiedis leading cops on a wild chase through backyards, house parties, in and out of apartments and past paparazzi after stealing items from a convenience store. Flea's wife, Melody Ehsani, also makes an appearance in the video along with stunt coordinator Airon Armstrong (who played Michael Myers in Halloween Kills) as one of the cops.

== Live performances ==
The song made its live debut on April 1, 2022, on Jimmy Kimmel Live.

== Personnel ==
Red Hot Chili Peppers

- Anthony Kiedis – lead vocals
- Flea – bass guitar
- Chad Smith – drums
- John Frusciante – guitar, backing vocals

== Charts ==
Weekly chart performance for "These Are the Ways"
| Chart (2022) | Peak position |
|---|---|
| Netherlands Single Tip (MegaCharts) | 29 |
| New Zealand Hot Singles (RMNZ) | 17 |
| US Hot Rock & Alternative Songs (Billboard) | 38 |

== Release history ==
Release dates and formats for "These Are the Ways"
| Region | Date | Format(s) | Label | Ref. |
|---|---|---|---|---|
| Various | March 31, 2022 | Digital download; streaming | Warner | |
| United States | June 7, 2022 | Alternative radio | Warner | |
| United States | June 7, 2022 | Mainstream rock radio | Warner | |
