= Renoise Tracks 2009–2011 =

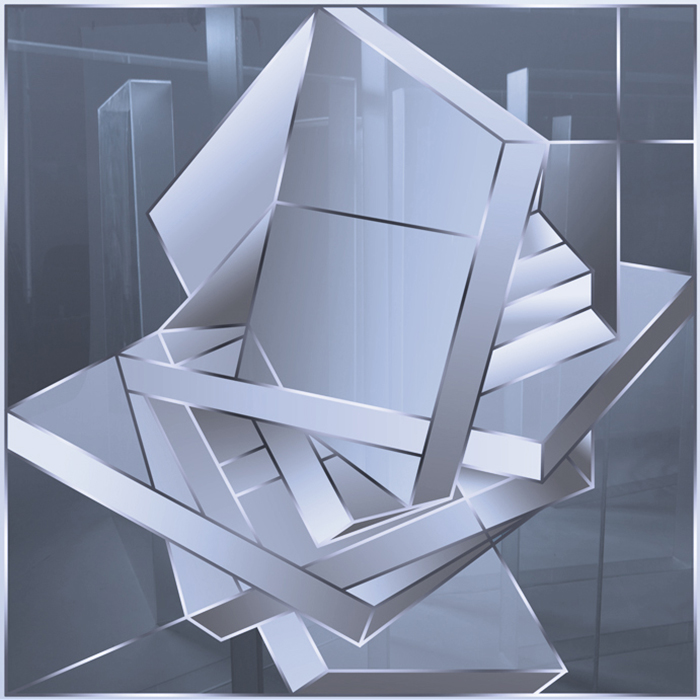

Studio album by John Frusciante
- Released: November 24, 2015; July 10, 2026
- Recorded: 2009–2011
- Genre: Synthpop, electronica, IDM, experimental rock
- Length: 36:38 / 28:37
- Label: Self-released on Bandcamp / AcidTest
- Producer: John Frusciante

John Frusciante chronology
4-Track Guitar Music EP (2015)	Renoise Tracks 2009–2011 (2015)	Foregrow EP (2016)

Alternative cover

Trickfinger High Low release chronology
Birth Control Pill EP (2024)	High Low (2026)	Rotation (2026)

Renoise Tracks 2009–2011 is the second internet album by John Frusciante, released independently on November 24, 2015 via his Bandcamp and SoundCloud webpages.

== Background ==
The songs on the album were all recorded between 2009 and 2011 in Frusciante's main studio during various stages of its development while he was working to expand his knowledge of engineering electronic music. The album was made free to download alongside 4-Track Guitar Music EP and other singles.

Frusciante explained his decision to make the release free saying, "It is my conviction that music should always be made because one loves music, regardless of whether one plans on selling it or not."

== Track listing ==
All tracks are written by John Frusciante.

No.	Title	Length
1.	"Genex 44"	4:45
2.	"Singular Scope 85"	5:39
3.	"Motiern 58"	3:33
4.	"Hew Brenderson"	6:08
5.	"Unending 126 mix"	4:24
6.	"Culminate"	4:07
7.	"90/180"	6:09
8.	"Anea 18"	1:52
Total length:		36:38

== High Low ==
Frusciante under his alias Trickfinger released a four album box set titled In A Box through Acid Test records via Bandcamp on July 10, 2026. The set includes reissues of Trickfinger and Trickfinger II along with two albums titled High Low and Rotation. High Low features six of the eight songs from the Renoise Tracks.

Frusciante said of High Low: "Some of this music did not get a proper release, and is compiled here as the vinyl record High Low. I don't think I have ever tried so hard at making music as I did during that period. This in contrast to those two Trickfinger records, where I wasn't trying at all. There’s something to be said for both mental states. When you're in one, the other seems impossible. I was really pushing myself on High Low. Looking back, it was as if I had an audience inside myself, driving me to go beyond my abilities, while at the same time I had a total disregard for any concept of an actual audience. It was one of those periods in life where things come together in a certain way that feels natural at the time, but seems foreign in retrospect. It felt like I was going to die if I didn't do something musically different."

=== High Low ===
All tracks are written by John Frusciante.

Side one
No.	Title	Length
1.	"Hew Branderson"	6:09
2.	"Motiern"	3:33
3.	"Culminate"	4:05
Total length:		13:47

Side two
No.	Title	Length
1.	"Singular Scope"	5:39
2.	"Genex"	4:45
3.	"Unending"	4:26
Total length:		14:50

== Personnel ==
- John Frusciante – all instruments
- Aura T-09 – cover art, design
