= Foregrow =

EP by John Frusciante
- Released: April 16, 2016
- Recorded: 2009
- Genre: Synth-pop, progressive, electronica, IDM, experimental rock
- Length: 21:43
- Label: AcidTest
- Producer: John Frusciante

John Frusciante chronology
Enclosure (2014)	Foregrow (2016)	Trickfinger II (2017)

John Frusciante solo chronology
Renoise Tracks 2009–2011 (2015)	Foregrow (2016)	Maya (2020)

Foregrow is the seventh EP release by American musician John Frusciante (including the free 4-Track Guitar Music release on Bandcamp in November 2015). It was released for Record Store Day on April 16, 2016 by Acid Test (Absurd Recordings).

The EP is a compilation put together by Acid Test records gathering four of John's recordings during his initial songwriting period with his more experimental, electronic music which directly followed his work for the Trickfinger record. These tracks were also conceived around the same time of his recordings with Speed Dealer Moms, and even feature a modular synthesizer developed for John by his bandmate Chris McDonald. His free download album Renoise Tracks 2009–2011 available on his SoundCloud/Bandcamp pages was recorded during this time period as well.

== Background ==
The title track was recorded for RZA's film The Man with the Iron Fists and was included in the film, though did not appear on the soundtrack.

Describing the time surrounding the recordings, John writes, "Some of the programming and production techniques were inspired by people like Venetian Snares, AFX, Squarepusher, Gescom, DMX Crew, The Railway Raver, Ceephax Acid Crew, Luke Vibert, and Autechre. Martin Hannett's production of Joy Division, and things like Depeche Mode, Heaven 17s first record, New Order, and early Human League, were also influential on this stuff. But musically, it is my approach to synthesis, my sense of melody, and my sense of rhythm, which give this music its style, whatever one wishes to call it." Frusciante also mentions Yes and Genesis as influence regarding having longer songs with entirely different sections pieced together.

== Track listing ==
All tracks are written by John Frusciante.

No.	Title	Length
1.	"Foregrow"	6:37
2.	"Expre'act"	5:14
3.	"Lowth Forgue"	5:13
4.	"Unf"	4:39
Total length:		21:43

== Personnel ==
- John Frusciante – Roland TB-303 & MC-202, Yamaha DX7 synthesizer, Electro-Harmonix Microsynthesizer, Elektron Monomachine, MIDI guitar, sampling on "Lowth Forgue", vocals on "Foregrow"
- Stefan Betke – mastering
- Marcia Pinna – cover art sculpture
- Sarah Sitkin – photography

== Release history ==
Region	Date	Label	Format
Worldwide	April 16, 2016	Acid Test (Absurd Recordings)	Vinyl (Record Store Day release), black vinyl
Worldwide	June 7, 2016	Acid Test (Absurd Recordings)	CD
Worldwide	August 12, 2016	Acid Test (Absurd Recordings)	Vinyl, limited silver repressing
