= Swahili Blonde =

American experimental musical project

- Origin: Los Angeles, California, United States
- Genres: Alternative rock, experimental rock, art rock, afrobeat, worldbeat
- Years active: 2009–present
- Labels: Manimal Vinyl; Neurotic Yell
- Members: Nicole Turley; Laena Geronimo (Myers-Ionita); Dante Adrian White-Aliano; Arianna Basco; Heather Cvar
- Website: www.neuroticyellrecords.com/artists/swahili-blonde/ www.myspace.com/swahiliblonde

Swahili Blonde is an experimental musical project formed in Los Angeles, California in 2009. It was founded by former WEAVE! drummer and vocalist Nicole Turley, violinist and bassist Laena Myers-Ionita, Duran Duran bassist John Taylor and multi-instrumentalists Stella Mozgawa and Michael Quinn. Red Hot Chili Peppers guitarist and Turley's now ex-husband, John Frusciante, performs guitar on the band's recordings, and performed alongside the group at their debut performance, while he was briefly a full-time band member.

Swahili Blonde is signed to Manimal Vinyl. They made their live debut at The Echo club in Los Angeles on July 10, 2010. The band utilizes disorientating chord progressions and obscure rhythms, with songs featuring a variety of instruments. The live line-up features Nicole Turley, Laena Geronimo (Myers-Ionita), Dante Adrian White-Aliano, Arianna Basco, and Heather Cvar. The band also included Laena's father, former Devo drummer Alan Myers, until his death in 2013.

Swahili Blonde's first digital single, "Elixor Fixor", was released on iTunes on December 13, 2009, with a second, "Dr. Teeth", released in March 2010. The project's debut album, Man Meat, was released on August 3, 2010, mastered by Aaron Funk. Frusciante had previously worked with Funk in the collaborative group Speed Dealer Moms along with Chris McDonald.

In 2014, members Nicole, Laena, John, and Dante released a 4-track digital EP in collaboration with Bosnian Rainbows members Teri Gender Bender and Omar Rodríguez-López under the name Kimono Kult. Nicole wrote and arranged all the music and Teri wrote and performed all vocals, with backing vocals provided by Turley.

Although originally planned for a January, then November 2013 release, the group's third album, Deities in Decline, was pushed back until March 2014, two weeks after Hiding in the Light by Kimono Kult, then was delayed again until later in 2014.

== Live line-up ==
- Nicole Turley – vocals, percussion, drums, keyboards, omnichord
  - Man Meat recordings: cr-8000, handsonic, xylophone, bass, sitar, guitar, organ, Minimoog, string synth
  - Psycho Tropical Ballet Pink recordings: cr-78, handsonic, bass, sitar, omnichord, dx-7, Minimoog
- Heather Cvar – backing vocals (recorded "Watch That Grandad GO" (Bauhaus cover) and "Etoile De Mer")
- Arianna Basco – backing vocals (recorded "Watch That Grandad GO" and "Etoile De Mer")
- Laena Geronimo – violin, bass
- Dante White-Aliano – bass, guitar

=== Other studio performers / former guests ===
- John Frusciante – guitar, backing vocals on "Red Money" (David Bowie/Carlos Alomar cover), co-wrote "Tigress Ritual" (2009–2015 in studio, 2010 live)
- Stella Mozgawa – drums, bass, Minimoog, string synth, backing vocals on "Red Money" (2009–2010 in studio)
- Michael Quinn – cello, trumpet, drums (2009–2010 in studio), guitar (2010 live)
- John Taylor – bass and co-wrote "Tigress Ritual" (2009–2010 in studio)
- Alan Myers – drums, percussion, recorded "Watch That Grandad GO" for Man Meat bonus tracks (2010–2013 live)
- Brad Culkins – saxophone on "Zelda Has It", "Scoundrel Days" (a-ha cover)
- Adam Payne – drums, percussion
- Viv Albertine – guitar on "The Golden Corale [VAGENDA remix]"

== Discography ==
=== Studio albums ===
- Man Meat (2010)
- Psycho Tropical Ballet Pink (2011)
- Deities in Decline (2015)
- And Only the Melody Was Real (2016)

=== Singles ===
- "Elixor Fixor" (December 2009)
- "Dr. Teeth" (March 2010)

=== EPs ===
- Covers EP (March 2012)
- VAGENDA Vol. 1 (May 2012) {Nicole Turley remixes}

=== Kimono Kult ===
- Hiding in the Light (2014)
