= Trickfinger =

Studio album by Trickfinger
- Released: April 7, 2015
- Recorded: Winter 2007
- Genres: Acid house; IDM; electro
- Length: 37:09
- Label: Acid Test
- Producer: Trickfinger

Trickfinger chronology
Sect In Sgt (2012)	Trickfinger (2015)	Trickfinger II (2017)

John Frusciante chronology
Enclosure (2014)	Trickfinger (2015)	4-Track Guitar Music (2015)

Trickfinger is the first studio album by Trickfinger, the alias of American musician John Frusciante. The album was released on April 7, 2015, on the AcidTest label. This was Frusciante's second release under the Trickfinger alias. His first was the 2012 two track Sect In Sgt EP.

On January 28, 2015, Frusciante released the song "After Below" as a preview to the album.

== Background ==
Frusciante said of the album, "I started being serious about following my dream to make electronic music, and to be my own engineer, five years ago. For the 10 years prior to that, I had been playing guitar along with a wide range of different types of programmed synthesizer and sample-based music, emulating what I heard as best as I could. I found that the languages machines forced programmers to think in had caused them to discover a new musical vocabulary...

In 2007, I started to learn how to program all the instruments we associate with acid house music and some other hardware. For about seven months I didn’t record anything. Then I started recording, playing 10 or so synced machines through a small mixer into a CD burner. This was all experimental acid house, my skills at making rock music playing no part in it whatsoever. I had lost interest in traditional songwriting and I was excited about finding new methods for creating music. I’d surround myself with machines, program one and then another and enjoy what was a fascinating process from beginning to end…"

In May 2026, Frusciante announced through the Acid Test page on bandcamp that to celebrate the tenth anniversary of Trickfinger, In a Box, a four album box set, would be released on July 10, 2026 through Acid Test. The box set includes Trickfinger and Trickfinger II reissued on green and red colored vinyl respectively, along with two new albums, High Low and Rotation.

== Critical reception ==
Professional ratings
Review scores
Source	Rating
Exclaim!	8/10
Pitchfork Media	5.9/10
Resident Advisor	3.5/5

Writing for Exclaim!, Chad Barnes called the record "a fun, engaging album with complex, weaving, synth-based hooks that are often played in a similar style to Frusciante's guitar playing".

== Track listing ==
All tracks are written by Trickfinger.

No.	Title	Length
1.	"After Below"	4:29
2.	"Before Above"	4:20
3.	"Rainover"	6:58
4.	"Sain"	3:32
5.	"85h"	4:06
6.	"4:30"	5:13
7.	"100mc4"	4:48
8.	"Phurip"	3:42
Total length:		37:09
