= Estrus (EP) =

Estrus EP

EP by John Frusciante
- Released: 1997
- Genre: Experimental rock
- Length: 8:42
- Label: Birdman
- Producer: John Frusciante

John Frusciante chronology
Niandra Lades and Usually Just a T-Shirt (1994)	Estrus EP (1997)	Smile from the Streets You Hold (1997)

Estrus EP is the first EP by John Frusciante, a 7" extended play released in 1997. Only 400–500 copies of this vinyl EP were pressed and could be purchased through Birdman Recordings. The first song, "Estrus", was released as the last song on Smile from the Streets You Hold under the title "Estress". The b-side "Outside Space" was originally recorded for Frusciante's debut album Niandra Lades and Usually Just a T-Shirt, and a brief sample can be heard in the final ten seconds of the track "Mascara".

== Track listing ==
All tracks are written by John Frusciante.

No.	Title	Length
1.	"Estrus" (later called "Estress" on Smile from the Streets You Hold)	2:15
2.	"Outside Space"	6:27
Total length:		8:42
