= Unlimited Love =

2022 studio album by Red Hot Chili Peppers

Studio album by Red Hot Chili Peppers
- Released: April 1, 2022
- Recorded: November 2020 – August 2021
- Studio: Shangri-La (Malibu, California)
- Genres: Funk rock; alternative rock
- Length: 73:13
- Label: Warner
- Producer: Rick Rubin

Red Hot Chili Peppers chronology
Live in Paris (2016)	Unlimited Love (2022)	Return of the Dream Canteen (2022)

Singles from Unlimited Love
- 1. "Black Summer" Released: February 4, 2022; 2. "These Are the Ways" Released: March 31, 2022

Alternative cover
- Amoeba Records exclusive "LA Version" album cover

Unlimited Love is the twelfth studio album by the American rock band Red Hot Chili Peppers, released through Warner Records on April 1, 2022. The album is the first with both guitarist John Frusciante since Stadium Arcadium (2006) and producer Rick Rubin since I'm with You (2011). Its six-year gap from The Getaway (2016) marks the longest between two Red Hot Chili Peppers albums to date.

The first single, "Black Summer", was released on February 4, 2022, and became the Chili Peppers' fourteenth number-one on the Billboard Alternative Songs chart. "These Are the Ways" followed on March 31, 2022. A world tour began in June 2022.

Unlimited Love received generally positive reviews. It debuted at number one in sixteen countries including the United States where it was the Chili Peppers' first number-one album since Stadium Arcadium (2006). A second full studio album, Return of the Dream Canteen, was recorded during the same sessions and was released on October 14, 2022.

== Background ==
Following the tour for their eleventh album, The Getaway (2016), the Red Hot Chili Peppers began writing their next album with guitarist Josh Klinghoffer. However, singer Anthony Kiedis and bassist Flea were unhappy with their progress. They wondered if they could involve their former guitarist John Frusciante, who had recorded several albums with the Chili Peppers but left in 2009 and moved into making electronic music. Frusciante said: "Flea had put the idea [of rejoining] in my head and I was sitting there with the guitar thinking that I hadn't written any rock music in so long. Could I still do that?"

On December 15, 2019, the Chili Peppers announced that, after 10 years, Frusciante had rejoined, replacing Klinghoffer. In an interview, Klinghoffer said there was no animosity: "It's absolutely John's place to be in that band ... I'm happy that he's back with them." Flea said separating from Klinghoffer had been difficult, but that "artistically, in terms of being able to speak the same [musical] language, it was easier working with John. Getting back into a room and starting to play and letting the thing unfold… was really exciting." After reuniting with Frusciante, at his request, the band played through songs from their first three albums. The drummer, Chad Smith, said Frusciante "wanted to reconnect with the band that he fell in love with", and Kiedis said the exercise was about getting "back to basics" and playing together without expectations. On February 8, 2020, Frusciante performed with the Chili Peppers for the first time in thirteen years at a memorial service held by the Tony Hawk Foundation for the late Andrew Burkle, a film producer and the son of billionaire Ronald Burkle. Shows were scheduled for three festivals that May but were cancelled due to the COVID-19 pandemic.

== Production and music ==
After working with Danger Mouse on The Getaway, the Chili Peppers brought in Rick Rubin, who has produced several of their most successful albums. Rubin said seeing their first rehearsal after Frusciante's return made him cry: "It was so thrilling to see that group of people back together because they made such great music for so long and it really hit me in an emotional way."

Rehearsals were halted in 2020 due to the COVID-19 pandemic. They resumed in 2021 at Rubin's Shangri-La studio in Malibu with around 100 new songs to work on. The band recorded almost 50 tracks, with the band intending to release 40 of the tracks as one album, spread over seven physical discs. The band's label, Warner Records, resisted this release strategy with a "compromise" being reached where the band split thirty-four songs across two separate studio albums. The second album from the recording sessions, Return of the Dream Canteen, was released on October 14, 2022.

Reviewers described the album as funk rock and alternative rock. NME said it shared the "melancholic riffmaking, anthemic choruses and softly-sung melodies" of Frusciante's previous work with the Chili Peppers but introduced new "grungey" and acoustic elements.

== Release and promotion ==
The Red Hot Chili Peppers announced Unlimited Love on February 4, 2022. The first single, "Black Summer", was released on February 4, backed by a music video directed by Deborah Chow. It became the Chili Peppers' fourteenth number-one single on the Billboard charts and their 26th top-ten single on the Alternative Songs chart. The band previewed the new album by releasing "Poster Child" as a promotional single on March 4, backed by a music video directed by Julien & Thami, followed by "Not the One" on March 24. "These Are the Ways", the second single, was released on March 31 with a music video directed by Malia James.

The Chili Peppers performed their first show to promote the album at the Fonda Theatre on April 1. This was followed by performances on Jimmy Kimmel Live!, The Tonight Show Starring Jimmy Fallon, and The Howard Stern Show as well as at Amoeba Music and the Yaamava' Resort & Casino in April and at the New Orleans Jazz & Heritage Festival in May. A scheduled appearance at the Billboard Music Awards was canceled. SiriusXM launched the Whole Lotta Red Hot channel on April 1. The channel features track-by-track commentary on Unlimited Love and an exclusive concert for subscribers later in the year.

On June 4, the Red Hot Chili Peppers began a global stadium tour, starting in Seville, Spain which continued into 2023 in support of Return of the Dream Canteen. The shows were supported by acts including the Strokes, A$AP Rocky, Beck, Haim, St. Vincent, Anderson .Paak, Nas, Thundercat, King Princess, and Post Malone.

== Critical reception ==
Professional ratings
Aggregate scores
Source	Rating
AnyDecentMusic?	6.3/10
Metacritic	71/100
Review scores
Source	Rating
AllMusic	3.5/5 stars
The A.V. Club	B
Clash	9/10
Classic Rock	3.5/5 stars
Evening Standard	4/5 stars
Exclaim!	7/10
NME	4/5 stars
Pitchfork	6.2/10
Rolling Stone	4/5 stars
Under the Radar	5/10

At Metacritic, which assigns a normalized rating out of 100 to reviews from mainstream publications, Unlimited Love has an average score of 71 based on 20 reviews, indicating "generally favorable reviews".

Brittany Spanos of Rolling Stone gave the album four out of five stars, writing: "more than anything, this record feels like a coming home. There's a certain magic that happens with these four musicians, and Frusciante's absence always leaves a piece of the puzzle missing." Ali Shutler of NME gave the album four out of five stars, writing that "there's a lot to Unlimited Love, both in scale and ambition. It's at once familiar – without being boring – and fresh." Clash rated the album 9/10, with reviewer Isabella Miller describing it as a "celebration of union, friendship, and life, all manifested across 17 tracks." In a glowing review, Paolo Ragusa of Consequence praised the lyrics and musicianship, writing that it is "fascinating to hear a band nearly forty years into their career try to reach their audience in a different way."

Some critics found the album mediocre; Steve Beebee of Kerrang! wrote that "It's a good record; just not a great one... There are, however, way too many tracks that miss their marks, trying to supplant the old energy with wisdom; the magik with maturity." Sam Sodomsky of Pitchfork gave it 6.2 out of 10, saying the band "[balanced] the risk of self-parody with the need to live up to people's nostalgia, knowing they've already written the music they'll be remembered for but still wanting to keep the ride going". Mark Richardson of the Wall Street Journal said the album lacked energy and purpose and "features their classic sound but little that's new or exciting". Phil Mongredien of The Guardian described the album as "bloated and self-indulgent ... with barely a memorable melody or thought-provoking lyric among its 17 tracks". Ryan Leas of Stereogum found that, aside from some highlights, "the crime of Unlimited Love, with all its weight within RHCP's narrative and all the excitement some might've felt, is that the bulk of the album is just completely unmemorable".

The music video for "Black Summer" won the Best Rock award in the 2022 MTV Video Music Awards and the band was also nominated for Group of the Year. The band now has thirty nominations at the MTV Video Music Awards since 1990, and these are their first nominations since 2006 when they were nominated for "Dani California". The band also received the Global Icon Award and performed at the awards show. They also received a nomination for Best Rock Band at the 2022 MTV Europe Music Awards. The band was nominated for three American Music Awards for Favorite Rock Album (Unlimited Love), Favorite Rock Song ("Black Summer") and Favorite Rock Artist.

== Commercial performance ==
The album was a worldwide commercial success, debuting at number-one in sixteen different countries including Argentina, Australia, Austria, Canada, Croatia, France, Germany, Hungary, Ireland, Netherlands, New Zealand, Portugal, Scotland, Switzerland, United Kingdom and United States.

In its home country of the United States, Unlimited Love was the band's second number one on the Billboard 200 and the first since 2006's Stadium Arcadium album selling 97,500 equivalent album units. It marked the longest gap ever between number one albums since Celine Dion waited seventeen years and nearly eight months between number one albums. Unlimited Love had the largest week by equivalent album units and album sales for any rock album in over a year since Paul McCartney's McCartney III album in January 2021. The sales for Unlimited Love were boosted by various vinyl variants and special editions of the album. The album sold 38,500 copies on vinyl, which was the largest sales week for an album on vinyl in 2022 and the second largest sales week for a rock album since 1991.

In the United Kingdom, Unlimited Love debuted at number one, becoming the band's first chart-topper in eleven years since 2011's I'm With You. Unlimited Love sold 27,426 units in its first week, 20,989 of which came from physical formats. Digitally, the album sold 2,315 downloads and streamed 4,122 album-equivalent units.

== Track listing ==
All tracks are written by Anthony Kiedis, Flea, John Frusciante and Chad Smith.

Unlimited Love
No.	Title	Length
1.	"Black Summer"	3:52
2.	"Here Ever After"	3:50
3.	"Aquatic Mouth Dance"	4:20
4.	"Not the One"	4:26
5.	"Poster Child"	5:18
6.	"The Great Apes"	5:01
7.	"It's Only Natural"	5:33
8.	"She's a Lover"	3:41
9.	"These Are the Ways"	3:56
10.	"Whatchu Thinkin'"	3:40
11.	"Bastards of Light"	3:38
12.	"White Braids & Pillow Chair"	3:40
13.	"One Way Traffic"	4:10
14.	"Veronica"	4:28
15.	"Let 'Em Cry"	4:23
16.	"The Heavy Wing"	5:31
17.	"Tangelo"	3:37
Total length:		73:13

Japanese CD bonus track
No.	Title	Length
18.	"Nerve Flip"	3:06
Total length:		76:19

== Personnel ==
Red Hot Chili Peppers

- Anthony Kiedis – lead vocals
- Flea – bass (all tracks), piano (track 4), trumpet (3, 15)
- John Frusciante – electric guitar (1–16), backing vocals (1, 3, 5–9, 11–14), co-lead vocals (16), synthesizer (2, 3, 5, 7, 11, 12, 14, 16, 17), Mellotron (5), acoustic guitar (11, 14, 17)
- Chad Smith – drums (1, 3–16), percussion (2), tambourine (1, 4), bass (2), shaker (5, 7, 15)

Additional musicians

- Cory Henry – organ (5, 15)
- Lenny Castro – percussion (5)
- Mauro Refosco – percussion (3, 8, 10, 11, 13)
- Nate Walcott – trumpet (3)
- Josh Johnson – saxophone (3)
- Vikram Devasthali – trombone (3)
- Mathew Tollings – piano (1, 6)
- Aura T-09 – backing vocals (4)

Production

- Rick Rubin – production
- Ryan Hewitt – mixing, recording
- Bernie Grundman – vinyl mastering
- Vlado Meller – CD and digital mastering
- Jeremy Lubsey – CD and digital assistant mastering
- Bo Bodnar – engineering
- Phillip Broussard Jr. – engineering
- Jason Lader – engineering
- Ethan Mates – engineering
- Dylan Neustadter – engineering
- Jonathan Pfarr – assistant engineering
- Chaz Sexton – assistant engineering
- Chris Warren – band technician
- Henry Trejo – band technician
- Lawrence Malchose – studio technician
- Charlie Bolois – studio technician
- Gage Freeman – co-ordinator production
- Eric Lynn – co-originator production
- Sami Bañuelos – band assistant

Imagery

- Clara Balzary – photography
- Sarah Zoraya and Aura T-09 – design

== Charts ==
=== Weekly charts ===
Weekly chart performance for Unlimited Love
Chart (2022)	Peak position
Argentine Albums (CAPIF)	1
Australian Albums (ARIA)	1
Austrian Albums (Ö3 Austria)	1
Belgian Albums (Ultratop Flanders)	2
Belgian Albums (Ultratop Wallonia)	2
Canadian Albums (Billboard)	1
Croatian International Albums (HDU)	1
Czech Albums (ČNS IFPI)	3
Danish Albums (Hitlisten)	4
Dutch Albums (Album Top 100)	1
Finnish Albums (Suomen virallinen lista)	3
French Albums (SNEP)	1
German Albums (Offizielle Top 100)	1
Greek Albums (IFPI)	2
Hungarian Albums (MAHASZ)	1
Irish Albums (IRMA)	1
Italian Albums (FIMI)	2
Japanese Albums (Oricon)	9
Japanese Hot Albums (Billboard Japan)	7
Lithuanian Albums (AGATA)	7
New Zealand Albums (RMNZ)	1
Norwegian Albums (VG-lista)	9
Polish Albums (ZPAV)	4
Portuguese Albums (AFP)	1
Scottish Albums (Official Charts)	1
Spanish Albums (Promusicae)	2
Swedish Albums (Sverigetopplistan)	2
Swiss Albums (Schweizer Hitparade)	1
UK Albums (Official Charts)	1
Uruguayan Albums (CUD)	2
US Billboard 200	1
US Top Alternative Albums (Billboard)	1
US Top Rock Albums (Billboard)	1

=== Year-end charts ===
Year-end chart performance for Unlimited Love
Chart (2022)	Position
Austrian Albums (Ö3 Austria)	39
Belgian Albums (Ultratop Flanders)	95
Belgian Albums (Ultratop Wallonia)	61
Dutch Albums (Album Top 100)	56
French Albums (SNEP)	64
German Albums (Offizielle Top 100)	13
Hungarian Albums (MAHASZ)	14
Japanese Download Albums (Billboard Japan)	53
Polish Albums (ZPAV)	68
Spanish Albums (PROMUSICAE)	83
Swiss Albums (Schweizer Hitparade)	18
US Top Album Sales (Billboard)	28
US Top Rock Albums (Billboard)	40
US Top Alternative Albums (Billboard)	25

== Certifications ==
Certifications for Unlimited Love
Region	Certification	Certified units/sales
France (SNEP)	Gold	50,000^{‡}
United Kingdom (BPI)	Silver	60,000^{‡}
^{‡} Sales+streaming figures based on certification alone.
