= Elektron Monomachine =

Synthesizer and music sequencer

Monomachine
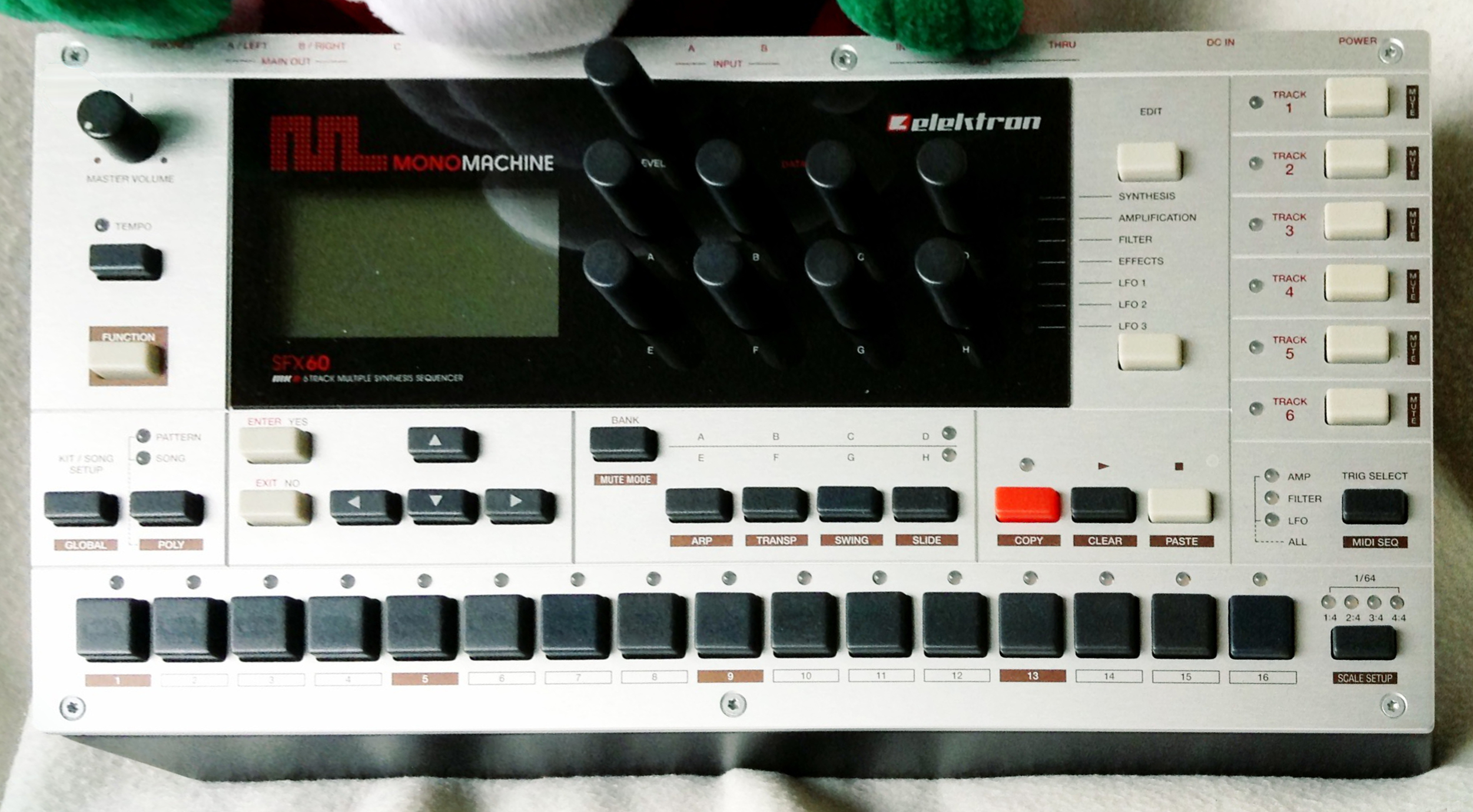
- Monomachine SFX-60
- Manufacturer: Elektron
- Dates: 2004–2016
- Price: SFX-6: US$1950; SFX-60: US$1540

Technical specifications
- Polyphony: 6
- Timbrality: 6
- Oscillator: 3×6
- LFO: 18
- Synthesis type: Virtual analog Subtractive
- Aftertouch expression: No
- Velocity expression: No
- Storage memory: 6×128 patches
- Effects: Yes

Input/output
- Keyboard: 37-key Velocity Aftertouch
- Left-hand control: 8× Rotaries; Joystick (SFX-6 only)
- External control: MIDI

The Elektron Monomachine is a synthesizer and music sequencer by Elektron. The Monomachine was available as SFX-60 model, which is a desktop sound module, and was available as the SFX-6 model, which has a keyboard and a joystick controller. During the last quarter of 2007 Elektron released the SFX-60 MkII, which is a revision providing higher signal-to-noise ratio, a slimmer design and the ability to add user waveforms, introduced with OS 1.20 in July 2008.

The Monomachine offers five different synthesis engines called SID, VO, FM+, SuperWave, and DigiPro. It also offers a variety of audio effects, which can be applied both to the internally generated voices and to external sources using the two audio inputs. The sequencer offers six tracks (Note: Offers six internal tracks and six external tracks for controlling other MIDI equipment.) programmable either by playing in real time or via a step input method similar to classic drum machines and sequenced synthesizers. The sequencer also features what Elektron refer to as a "parameter locks", where each sequencer step can be associated with a snapshot of all the editable parameters for a track. Signals can be routed externally to three stereo or six mono outputs.

== Design ==
According to its designers, the Monomachine is designed to be a creative synthesizer and is not following the specs race as is common for today's synthesizers. The user manual states:

Synthesizers are available in many different types and forms. Nevertheless, for most part they follow the norm how a synthesizer of its era is expected to be. Development for musical tools generally comes in the form of new synthesis techniques or an increase in polyphony, memory or other quantitative elements. The advances in the music machine world have brought numerous good inventions for musicians. However, we believe usability is easily lost in the hunt for the highest specifications.

With the Monomachine we have tried creating a synthesizer free from prejudice, and focus on what actually spurs creativity without letting technology stand in your way. We want to inspire you to make sounds and music you haven't even thought of.

=== SID ===
The SID emulation method is based on the sound processor from the Commodore 64 home computer (Elektron formerly offered a separate product known as the SidStation, each unit of which was built around a SID chip. However, the company has now ceased production, indicating that chips are no longer available). The parameters available in the Monomachine are considerably more limited than those in the SidStation, employing an interface editable in more conventional terms than the SID's wavetable approach. Saw, triangle, pulse, mixed and noise waveforms are available, and the sounds produced tend to be sharp-edged and gritty in character.

=== VO ===
The VO engine is a voice synthesizer similar in sound to the Speak & Spell of the 1980s.

=== FM+ ===
FM+ sounds similar to the Yamaha DX series synthesizers, which use frequency modulation to construct sound.

=== SuperWave ===
SuperWave is a synth engine. Elektron states it is "based on the analog world of synthesizers."

=== DigiPro ===
DigiPro is a machine that offers raw, 12-bit digital waveforms. DigiPro-Wave offers 32 waveforms, with interpolation between adjacent waveforms. DigiPro Beat Box is a drum machine, featuring 24 12-bit percussion samples. DigiPro Doubledraw allows the user to create an oscillator by blending two different waveforms. DigiPro Ensemble resembles the SuperWave Ensemble machine, but is built for use with the fixed DigiPro waveforms or those loaded by the user. The Doubledraw and Ensemble machines are only available on the MkII.

== Bands and Artists that use the Monomachine ==
- Actress
- Atticus Ross
- Autechre
- Avey Tare
- Bordeaux
- Boys Noize
- Cevin Key
- The Chemical Brothers
- Dntel
- Gayphextwin
- James Figurine
- John Frusciante
- John Tejada
- The Knife
- Olof Dreijer
- The Postal Service
- Thom Yorke
- Stephen Morris (New Order)
- SONOIO
- SOPHIE
- Trash80
- Trent Reznor
- White Town
- Zombie Nation
