= Black Summer (song) =

Single by Red Hot Chili Peppers

from the album Unlimited Love
- Released: February 4, 2022
- Studio: Shangri-La (Malibu, California)
- Genre: Alternative rock
- Length: 3:52
- Label: Warner
- Songwriters: Flea; John Frusciante; Anthony Kiedis; Chad Smith
- Producer: Rick Rubin

Red Hot Chili Peppers singles chronology
"Goodbye Angels" (2017)	"Black Summer" (2022)	"These Are the Ways" (2022)

Music video
- "Black Summer" on YouTube

"Black Summer" is a song by American rock band Red Hot Chili Peppers and is the first single from their twelfth studio album, Unlimited Love. The single was released on February 4, 2022, and it was their first song in 16 years to feature guitarist John Frusciante, following his return to the band in 2019.

"Black Summer" quickly became a number-one single for the band on Alternative Airplay, giving them their 14th number-one single, a record for any artist on that chart, and 26th top ten single, second most for any artist on the Alternative Songs chart trailing only the Foo Fighters who have 28 top ten singles; it also gave the band a number-one single in four different decades on the Alternative Songs chart, tying them with Green Day for the most ever by an artist. "Black Summer" won the 2022 MTV Video Music Award for Best Rock Video.

== Reception ==
The song received positive reviews from critics, although Anthony Kiedis' vocals drew confusion from critics, with some likening it to an Irish accent or pirate accent. Kiedis explained that the accent was a tribute to Welsh singer-songwriter Cate Le Bon, whom the band's former guitarist Josh Klinghoffer had recorded with on her fifth studio album, Reward, and performed with in the experimental musical collective Banana. Vulture praised the song, saying that it has "everything you'd want with a Chilis joint — ethereal riffs noodling along, wonderfully nonsensical lyrics, and a music video that has Anthony Kiedis disrobing at the midway point".

Frusciante's guitar work was particularly praised, and was likened to his work on the band's 2006 album Stadium Arcadium. Consequence lauded Frusciante's "signature guitar sound", noting that it "links perfectly with Flea’s energetic bass work and steps out for multiple solos. And not only that, Frusciante's anthemic backup vocals have returned, amplifying the song's chorus to create a wide screen, stadium worthy effect."

Producer Rick Rubin's return was also highlighted by Clash, who compared the single to the band's earlier work, with its "funky melodies and heavy rock weaved throughout".

== Music video ==
A music video was released simultaneously with the single, directed by Deborah Chow.

The music video for "Black Summer" is nominated for a 2022 MTV Video Music Award for Best Rock Video. It marked the band's 29th nomination at the MTV Video Music Awards since 1990 and their first nomination since 2006 when they were nominated for "Dani California".

== Live performances ==
The song made its live debut on April 1, 2022, on The Tonight Show Starring Jimmy Fallon and was played at every show on the band's 2022-2024 Unlimited Love Tour. It has been performed over 85 times, making it the most performed song from Unlimited Love.

Red Hot Chili Peppers performed the song on January 30, 2025 at Kia Forum in Inglewood, California for FireAid to help with relief efforts for the January 2025 Southern California wildfires.

== Personnel ==
Personnel taken from Unlimited Love liner notes, and Sound on Sound.

Red Hot Chili Peppers

- Anthony Kiedis – lead vocals
- John Frusciante – guitar, backing vocals
- Flea – bass guitar
- Chad Smith – drums, tambourine

Additional musicians

- Matt Rollings – piano

== Charts ==
=== Weekly charts ===
Weekly chart performance for "Black Summer"
Chart (2022)	Peak position
Argentina Hot 100 (Billboard)	85
Australia (ARIA)	82
Austria (Ö3 Austria Top 40)	60
Canada Hot 100 (Billboard)	38
Canada Rock (Billboard)	1
Croatia (Billboard)	20
Czech Republic Airplay (ČNS IFPI)	4
Czech Republic Singles Digital (ČNS IFPI)	83
Finland Airplay (Radiosoittolista)	34
France (SNEP)	133
Germany (GfK)	67
Global 200 (Billboard)	51
Hungary (Single Top 40)	17
Iceland (Tónlistinn)	40
Ireland (IRMA)	31
Italy Airplay (FIMI)	36
Israel (Media Forest)	3
Japan Hot Overseas (Billboard Japan)	3
Lithuania (AGATA)	61
Netherlands (Single Top 100)	67
New Zealand Hot Singles (RMNZ)	2
Portugal (AFP)	110
San Marino (SMRRTV Top 50)	36
Slovakia (Singles Digitál Top 100)	99
Sweden Heatseeker (Sverigetopplistan)	3
Switzerland (Schweizer Hitparade)	40
UK Singles (Official Charts)	43
Ukraine Airplay (TopHit)	96
US Billboard Hot 100	78
US Hot Rock & Alternative Songs (Billboard)	10
US Rock & Alternative Airplay (Billboard)	1

=== Year-end charts ===
2022 year-end chart performance for "Black Summer"
Chart (2022)	Position
US Hot Rock & Alternative Songs (Billboard)	31
US Rock Airplay (Billboard)	1

2023 year-end chart performance for "Black Summer"
Chart (2023)	Position
US Rock Airplay (Billboard)	34

== Certifications ==
Certifications for "Black Summer"
Region	Certification	Certified units/sales
France (SNEP)	Gold	100,000^{‡}
New Zealand (RMNZ)	Gold	15,000^{‡}
^{‡} Sales+streaming figures based on certification alone.

== Release history ==
Release history for "Black Summer"
Region	Date	Format	Label	Ref.
Various	February 4, 2022	Digital download; streaming	Warner	
Italy	February 4, 2022	Radio airplay	Warner	
United States	February 7, 2022	Adult alternative radio	Warner	
United States	February 8, 2022	Alternative radio	Warner	
United States	February 8, 2022	Rock radio	Warner	
