= Trickfinger II =

Studio album by Trickfinger
- Released: 8 September 2017
- Recorded: Winter 2007
- Genres: Acid house; IDM; Electro
- Length: 25:54
- Label: Acid Test
- Producer: Trickfinger

Trickfinger chronology
Trickfinger (2015)	Trickfinger II (2017)	Look Down, See Us (2020)

John Frusciante chronology
Foregrow (2016)	Trickfinger II (2017)	Mahandini (by Dewa Budjana) (2018)

Trickfinger II is the second studio album by Trickfinger, the alias of musician John Frusciante, released on 8 September 2017 on the AcidTest label. The six songs were recorded in 2007 at the same time as his full-length Trickfinger album.

== Background ==
Like its predecessor, the former Red Hot Chili Peppers guitarist recorded the music for Trickfinger II back in 2007. Using a fleet of hardware synths and drum machines, the six-track LP was recorded live onto a CD burner, through a cheap mixer. John would sit on a chair, in his living room, surrounded by five to 15 machines, and just keep programming and jamming until the track was ready to be recorded. There were no overdubs – recorded all live. The music was never intended for release and made purely for discovery and learning experience, but Frusciante eventually agreed to publish the recordings on Oliver Bristow's Acid Test, which has been home to the likes of Donato Dozzy, Recondite and Tin Man. Trickfinger II was made available on vinyl, CD and as a digital download. He has said this about the making of the Trickfinger albums:

In my opinion, making music with no intention of releasing it is the best thing a musician can do for his own development in this day and age. The Trickfinger LP was made in that mindset, and it was the beginning of a new musical life for me. When I hear it, it sounds like I am opening up doorways to new worlds, and I never have had that feeling listening to music I made for the purpose of releasing it and selling it.

Acid Test unearthed these recordings and John agreed to a release. Trickfinger II is the second part to the recordings made during the winter of 2007.

In May 2026, Frusciante announced through the Acid Test page on bandcamp that to celebrate the tenth anniversary of Trickfinger, In a Box, a four album box set, would be released on July 10, 2026 through Acid Test. The box set will include Trickfinger and Trickfinger II reissued on green and red colored vinyl along with two new albums, High Low and Rotation.

== Track listing ==
All tracks are written by Trickfinger.

No.	Title	Length
1.	"Shift Sync"	3:55
2.	"Ruche"	5:03
3.	"Exclam"	3:57
4.	"Hasan"	4:23
5.	"Cuh"	3:45
6.	"Stall"	4:51
Total length:		25:54
