= Niandra LaDes and Usually Just a T-Shirt =

Studio album by John Frusciante
- Released: November 22, 1994
- Genres: Lo-fi; avant-garde; psychedelic rock; experimental rock
- Length: 70:12 (CD version); 76:06 (cassette version)
- Label: American
- Producer: John Frusciante

John Frusciante chronology
Niandra LaDes and Usually Just a T-Shirt (1994)	Estrus (1997)

Niandra LaDes and Usually Just a T-Shirt is the debut album by the American musician John Frusciante, released on November 22, 1994, by American Recordings.

Frusciante was previously a member of the Red Hot Chili Peppers, but left in 1992 after he became overwhelmed by their newfound popularity. He became severely depressed, developed a serious drug addiction, and isolated himself in his home to record music.

Niandra LaDes and Usually Just a T-Shirt combines avant-garde and stream-of-consciousness styles, with guitar, piano and effects all recorded on an inexpensive four-track home recorder. The album was met with confusion and a mixed response from fans and critics, and sold 15,000 copies by 1996. Two years later, Frusciante rejoined the Red Hot Chili Peppers after a period of addiction treatment.

== Background ==
Frusciante joined the Red Hot Chili Peppers in 1988 at the age of 18, and released his first album with the group, Mother's Milk, the following year. The follow-up album, Blood Sugar Sex Magik, was recorded in an empty mansion where the band decided to live for the duration of recording. Frusciante adapted well to the environment, and often spent his time alone painting, listening to music, and recording songs that would eventually make up the first half of the album, Niandra LaDes. Blood Sugar Sex Magik was released on September 24, 1991, and was an instant success. The album peaked at number three in the U.S. and went on to sell more than thirteen million copies worldwide. Soon after the album's release, Frusciante became overwhelmed by the band's newfound popularity. He felt that the Red Hot Chili Peppers were too famous, and wished they were still playing small nightclubs like they were before he had joined. During Blood Sugar Sex Magik's promotional tour, Frusciante began using heroin and cocaine heavily. He and vocalist Anthony Kiedis often argued before and after performances. According to Kiedis, Frusciante purposely sabotaged the Saturday Night Live performance of "Under the Bridge" by playing the wrong intro for the song and out of key. He quit during the Japanese leg of their world tour in 1992.

== Writing and recording ==
After leaving the Red Hot Chili Peppers, Frusciante continued to write and record solo material. He had been doing so since the age of nine, but had never considered releasing his material to the public. That was until several of his friends – including Johnny Depp, Perry Farrell, Gibby Haynes and Red Hot Chili Peppers bandmate Flea – encouraged him to release the material he wrote in his spare time during the Blood Sugar Sex Magik sessions. Frusciante began working on final cuts of the songs he had been writing, and producing them at his home. According to Frusciante, each song was completed in one take. During this period, Frusciante's use of heroin became more extreme; he began viewing drugs as the only way to "make sure you stay in touch with beauty instead of letting the ugliness of the world corrupt your soul".

"My Smile is a Rifle"
This clip illustrates the album's avant-garde lyrical themes and unconventional song structure.

During a 1994 interview, a visibly intoxicated Frusciante noted that he wrote the album in order to create "interesting music", which he felt no longer existed. He felt contemporary artists were not writing material he deemed worth listening to and the mainstream population were settling for mediocrity. Drugs were another significant topic on which Frusciante based Niandra LaDes and Usually Just a T-Shirt. According to Frusciante, he "was stoned for every single note [he] played on the album". He increased his drug use to cope with worsening depression that was caused by leaving the Red Hot Chili Peppers, and his subsequent isolation. Several songs on the album deal with his dislike for the Red Hot Chili Peppers' success, such as the album's eleventh track, "Blood on My Neck From Success".

All the music on the record was written by Frusciante, save for the cover of hardcore punk band Bad Brains' song "Big Takeover". The track was intentionally slowed down and recorded melodically because of a pastime in which Frusciante sang punk songs in different tempos: "It was just something I had been walking around thinking of in my head. Sometimes I'll walk around singing punk rock songs to myself, but as if they were regular songs instead of punk rock songs, you know, slow it down and make a melody instead of just yelling them out. And then the idea occurred me to record it like a Led Zeppelin ballad with mandolins and stuff." River Phoenix, a friend of Frusciante's, contributed guitar and backing vocals to two songs that were intended be included on the record, but were ultimately left off following his death in October.

Niandra LaDes and Usually Just a T-Shirt incorporates Frusciante's avant-garde style of song composition, with his stream-of-consciousness methodology. It features minimal orchestration, and Frusciante's vocals have a "fragile, wispy quality" as described by AllMusic. CMJ New Music Monthly called it "probably the most fucked-up album ever released by someone who had once played in stadiums." Frusciante recorded, mixed, produced and mastered the entire record by himself on a four-track tape, and released it on Rick Rubin's label, American Recordings. Warner Bros., the Red Hot Chili Peppers' label, originally held the rights to the album because of the leaving-artist clause in Frusciante's Red Hot Chili Peppers contract. Because he was living as a recluse, the label gladly handed the rights over to Rubin, who released the album under his label.

== Cover art and title ==
The cover art of Niandra LaDes and Usually Just a T-Shirt is a sepia photograph of Frusciante in drag which comes from a movie, titled Desert in Shape, that Toni Oswald was filming in the time of their relationship where Frusciante played Rose Sélavy. According to Toni Oswald, Frusciante's partner at the time of the album's making, this choice was inspired by Rrose Sélavy, the feminine pseudonym of Marcel Duchamp—the French painter and writer whom Oswald and Frusciante both deeply admired. Frusciante devised the name "Niandra LaDes" as his own feminine alter ego, an anagram of the David Bowie album Aladdin Sane. The phrase "Usually Just a T-Shirt" meanwhile derives from a clothes-exchanging ritual that Oswald and Frusciante often took part in when Frusciante was away on tour; after Frusciante asked what Oswald would wear with his clothes, she would reply, "Usually just a t-shirt." The phrase "To Clara" in the lower right refers to Clara Balzary, the first daughter of Flea.

== Release, reception, and aftermath ==
Professional ratings
Review scores
Source	Rating
AllMusic	4/5 stars
Entertainment Weekly	B−
Rolling Stone	2/5 stars
The Rolling Stone Album Guide	4/5 stars

Niandra LaDes and Usually Just a T-Shirt was initially previewed by Billboard magazine, who said that "Chili Peppers fans might be daunted by the album's elusive experimentalism." A representative of American Recordings did not foresee the album as being viable in any mainstream music stores, and some retailers went as far as to ban it from being sold. After the album was released, Frusciante played three small performances, and participated in a few magazine interviews to promote the album, explaining in one interview that people would be able to understand his work only if "their heads are capable of tripping out". At one point shortly after release, Frusciante began searching for a string quartet to play the album with him on tour. The idea was eventually discarded when he could not find a band that "understands why Ringo Starr is such a great drummer, can play Stravinsky, and also smokes pot". The concept of a tour was ultimately abandoned as well, due to Frusciante's diminishing health.

Niandra LaDes and Usually Just a T-Shirt was met with general confusion and a mixed response from fans and critics. David Wild of Rolling Stone wrote: "All in all, [the album is] a mess – but definitely a fascinating, often lovely mess. As one might expect of an album titled Niandra Lades and Usually Just a T-shirt, this is twisted, cool stuff." Marina Zogbi of Entertainment Weekly described Frusciante's guitar play as "hauntingly lovely," and said: "There's a fine line between brilliant and unlistenable, and Frusciante squarely straddles it here." The Boston Herald noted that while the album was "a stark display of Frusciante's acoustic guitar virtuosity" and "eerily beautiful", the singing was "terrible; his high notes will drive the neighborhood dogs into a frenzy".

Retrospective appraisal is generally more positive. In a 2003 review by Rolling Stone, critic Christian Hoard wrote: "[the album] sounds like a string of four-track demos. The first part of the album is slightly more tuneful than the more ambient, experimental second section [...] Mostly what you get are Frusciante's acoustic-guitar scratchings and stream-of-conscious ramblings." Steve Huey of AllMusic, who rated the album four out of five stars, said that "[the album was] an intriguing and unexpected departure from Frusciante's work with the Chili Peppers [and that] the sparse arrangements of the first half help set the stage for the gossamer guitar work later on." He went on to say that Usually Just a T-Shirt (the latter half of the album) contained "pleasant psychedelic instrumentals with plenty of backward-guitar effects". Ned Raggett, also of AllMusic, noted that "there's nothing quite so stunning as [Frusciante's] magnificent remake of Bad Brains' 'The Big Takeover'." Adam Williams of PopMatters said the album "fall[s] somewhere between madness and brilliance". He went on to compare Frusciante to Syd Barrett, and felt it was a "hint at a deeply cerebral artist looking within for inspiration and creativity".

Frusciante's drug addiction worsened as the years progressed. An article published by the Phoenix New Times described him as "a skeleton covered in thin skin". He participated in an interview with Dutch public broadcast station VPRO, the first media appearance he made since leaving the Red Hot Chili Peppers. In the interview Frusciante speaks of the positive effects drugs have had on his mind and proudly admits to being a "junkie". He went on to confess addictions to heroin and crack cocaine, but ultimately described himself as being in the best health of his life. Niandra LaDes and Usually Just a T-Shirt sold 15,000 copies by 1996; two years later Frusciante rehabilitated and rejoined the Red Hot Chili Peppers. In 2017, record label Superior Viaduct reissued Niandra LaDes and Usually Just a T-Shirt on vinyl.

== Track listing ==
All tracks are written by All tracks are written by John Frusciante, except "Big Takeover", written by Bad Brains.

Niandra LaDes
No.	Title	Length
1.	"As Can Be"	2:57
2.	"My Smile Is a Rifle"	3:48
3.	"Head (Beach Arab)"	2:05
4.	"Big Takeover"	3:18
5.	"Curtains"	2:30
6.	"Running Away into You"	2:12
7.	"Mascara"	3:40
8.	"Been Insane"	1:41
9.	"Skin Blues"	1:46
10.	"Your Pussy's Glued to a Building on Fire"	3:17
11.	"Blood on My Neck from Success"	3:09
12.	"Ten to Butter Blood Voodoo"	1:59
Total length:		32:22

Usually Just a T-Shirt
No.	Title	Length
13.	"Untitled #1"	0:34
14.	"Untitled #2"	4:21
15.	"Untitled #3"	1:50
16.	"Untitled #4"	1:38
17.	"Untitled #5"	1:30
18.	"Untitled #6"	1:29
19.	"Untitled #7"	1:42
20.	"Untitled #8"	7:55
21.	"Untitled #9"	7:04
22.	"Untitled #10"	0:25
23.	"Untitled #11"	1:51
24.	"Untitled #12"	5:27
25.	"Untitled #13"	1:52
Total length:		37:58 70:20

Note: Cassette versions of the album include the additional tracks "Ants" as track seven on side one (Niandra LaDes) and "Untitled #0" as track one on side two (Usually Just a T-Shirt).

== Sources ==
- Apter, Jeff (2004). Fornication: The Red Hot Chili Peppers Story. London: Omnibus Press. ISBN 1-84449-381-4.
- Kiedis, Anthony; Sloman, Larry (2004). Scar Tissue. New York City: Hyperion. ISBN 1-4013-0101-0.
- Todd, David (2012). Feeding Back: Conversations with Alternative Guitarists from Proto-Punk to Post-Rock. Chicago: Chicago Review Press. ISBN 978-1-6137-4059-0.
