= Bernie Grundman =

American audio engineer (born 1943)

- Born: December 16, 1943 (age 82); Minneapolis, Minnesota, U.S.
- Occupations: Audio engineer, mastering engineer
- Awards: Grammy Awards

Bernie Grundman (born December 16, 1943) is an American audio engineer, highly regarded in the industry for his decades of mastering analog tape mixes for vinyl disk, later transitioning into the digital era.

== Biography ==
He is originally from Minneapolis, Minnesota. Grundman served in the U.S. Air Force. In 1966, he moved from Arizona to Hollywood and, with almost no experience, got hired by Lester Koenig at Contemporary Records. After a couple of years on the job, Grundman was recruited by A&M Records' mastering department in Los Angeles, where he became much in demand, later becoming the department head. In 1984, he launched his own business, Bernie Grundman Mastering (BGM) in Hollywood. In 1997, Grundman opened a second studio in Tokyo with engineer Yasuji Maeda.

As of December 2025, Grundman had been nominated for 16 Grammy Awards and won 3. The LA studio, which includes engineers Chris Bellman, Patricia Sullivan, Joe Bozzi, and Mike Bozzi, mastered 37 Grammy-nominated projects in 2005. Grundman and his studios have also won numerous TEC Awards, including Best Mastering Facility and several production awards.

== Select works ==
Album	Year	Artist
Head to the Sky	1973	Earth, Wind & Fire
Horizon	1975	Carpenters
Band Wagon	1975	Shigeru Suzuki
Aja	1977	Steely Dan
Grease: The Original Soundtrack from the Motion Picture	1978	Various Artists
Shadows and Light	1980	Joni Mitchell
Dirty Mind	1980	Prince
Controversy	1981	Prince
Thriller	1982	Michael Jackson
Purple Rain	1984	Prince
Down Upbeat	1984	Casiopea
Soy Como Quiero Ser	1987	Luis Miguel
Lovesexy	1988	Prince
Flying in a Blue Dream	1989	Joe Satriani
20 Años	1990	Luis Miguel
Moment of Truth	1991	Terri Nunn
The Chronic	1992	Dr. Dre
The Hunter	1992	Jennifer Warnes
Aries (album)	1993	Luis Miguel
Alien Love Secrets	1995	Steve Vai
Me Against the World	1995	Tupac Shakur
Rata Blanca VII	1997	Rata Blanca
Como te Recuerdo	1998	Los Temerarios
The Charlie Brown Suite & Other Favorites	2003	Vince Guaraldi
Speakerboxxx/The Love Below	2003	OutKast
Shadows Collide with People	2004	John Frusciante
Private Corner	2010	Jacky Cheung
Inhibition	2012	Dot Hacker
How's Your Process? (Work)	2014	Dot Hacker
Breakaway	2014	Dark Horse Flyer
How's Your Process? (Play)	2014	Dot Hacker
Seven	2014	Lisa Stansfield
When The Levee Breaks (Music of Led Zeppelin)	2015	Vanessa Fernandez
In My Room	2016	Jacob Collier
Ultraelectromagneticpop! (25th anniversary reissue)	2018	Eraserheads
Mignonne (40th anniversary reissue)	2018	Taeko Onuki
The Empyrean (10th anniversary reissue)	2019	John Frusciante
1999 (2019 remaster, deluxe edition, and super deluxe edition)	2019	Prince
Making a Door Less Open	2020	Car Seat Headrest
Neon Arrow / Rewire	2021	Dot Hacker
Unlimited Love	2022	Red Hot Chili Peppers
Return of the Dream Canteen	2022	Red Hot Chili Peppers
Circus (vinyl remaster)	2022	Eraserheads
Chocolate and Cheese (deluxe edition)	2024	Ween
Cutterpillow (vinyl remaster)	2024	Eraserheads
Alvvays (10th anniversary reissue)	2024	Alvvays
dorndom	2025	Ivan Dorn
