= To Be One with You =

Studio album by Pluralone
- Released: November 22, 2019
- Recorded: September 2018 – August 2019
- Studios: Prairie Sun Studios, Palmquist Recording Studio, Now Space
- Length: 40:55
- Label: ORG Music
- Producer: Eric Palmquist

Pluralone chronology
Io Sono Quel Che Sono/Menina Mulher Da Pele Preta (2019)	To Be One with You (2019)	I Don't Feel Well (2020)

Singles from To Be One With You
- 1. "Shade" Released: October 21, 2019; 2. "Fall from Grace" Released: November 12, 2019

To Be One with You is the debut studio album from multi-instrumentalist and songwriter Josh Klinghoffer, under the pseudonym of Pluralone. The album features guest appearances from his Red Hot Chili Peppers bandmate Flea and his bandmates in the experimental rock band Dot Hacker, Eric Gardner and Clint Walsh along with appearances by Jane's Addiction bassist Eric Avery and former Red Hot Chili Peppers and Pearl Jam drummer Jack Irons. Klinghoffer previously released the single "Io Sono Quel Che Sono/Menina Mulher Da Pele Preta" under the Pluralone name.

"Shade" was released as the first single. "Fall from Grace" was released as second digital single on 12 November 2019. Both songs were released on ORG Music label SoundCloud profile.

Three weeks after the record's release it was announced that Klinghoffer was parting ways with the Red Hot Chili Peppers due to John Frusciante's return to the band.

== Music ==
Klinghoffer mentioned John Cale influence on "Shade" by saying: "I was listening to John Cale when this one came. There was a caustic nature to the whole thing. I heard drum fills that bucked time and guitar solo of gun shots (opted against that approach). Enlisted the sweet sounds of Clint Walsh to try and hide a bit of the bitterness."

On the release of "Fall From Grace" Klinghoffer said that it "is one of those improvised songs that I spent ages trying to decipher and turn into something mildly coherent. Not sure if I succeeded, but I think I captured the initial spirit…I think."

"Was Never There", with Flea on bass and Jack Irons on drums, and "Obscene" were originally written for Red Hot Chili Peppers in 2012 and 2015 respectively.

In December, the Official Pluralone Fan Club was announced, the first 250 enrolled received a 7-inch vinyl with the unreleased songs "Obscene" and "Fairy Tale".

Two more B-Sides from the To Be One with You sessions was released digitally on July 3, with the songs "Nowhere I Am" & "Directrix", the first one also count with Flea and Irons. On July 17 it will be released in a limited 7-inch blue vinyl.

In November 2021, for the second anniversary of the album's release, fans held a listening party where demos of "You Don't Know What You're Doing" and "Fairy Tale" were released, plus the unreleased songs "It's a Good Thing" and "Ceylon".

== Outtakes ==
According to an interview given to the medium Spin, Klinghoffer mentions that for the album sessions 17 songs were worked, of which 16 have seen the light and one remains unreleased. This songs were released digitally and on 7-inch vinyls.

The first two were "You Don't Know What You're Doing" and "Overflowing" released on the album's "Deluxe bundle", the songs "Obscene" and "Fairy Tale" were released as a gift for joining the Fan Club and later appears in the official store. The following "Nowhere I Am" and "Directrix" appeared as the third installment on the B-sides of the album.

== Track listing ==
All music is composed by Josh Klinghoffer.

Side A
No.	Title	Length
1.	"Barreling"	3:30
2.	"Rat Bastards at Every Turn"	4:50
3.	"Save"	4:04
4.	"Was Never There"	3:42
5.	"Fall From Grace"	4:49

Side B
No.	Title	Length
6.	"Shade"	3:54
7.	"Mourning"	4:22
8.	"Crawl"	2:39
9.	"The Ride"	3:11
10.	"Segue"	5:48
Total length:		40:55

== B-Sides ==
Bonus 7" Features B-Sides
No.	Title	Length
1.	"You Don’t Know What You’re Doing"	3:36
2.	"Overflowing"	4:08
Total length:		7:44

The Pluralone Official Fan Club 7" Gift
No.	Title	Length
1.	"Obscene"	3:57
2.	"Fairy Tale"	3:04
Total length:		7:01

7" B-sides #3
No.	Title	Length
1.	"Nowhere I Am"	3:33
2.	"Directrix"	2:21
Total length:		5:54

== Personnel ==
- Josh Klinghoffer – lead vocals, guitar, keyboards, bass, drums
- Jack Irons – drums (tracks 1, 2, 4, 6, 7, "Overflowing", "Obscene", "Nowhere I Am")
- Flea – bass (4, "Nowhere I Am")
- Chris Warren – percussion (4)
- Clint Walsh – guitar and lapsteel (6)
- Eric Gardner – drums (8)
- Eric Avery – bass (8)
- Dan Elkan – guitar (10)

with:

- Nate Walcott – strings written and arranged by (track 10)
