= Ryszard Horowitz =

Polish–American photographer (born 1939)

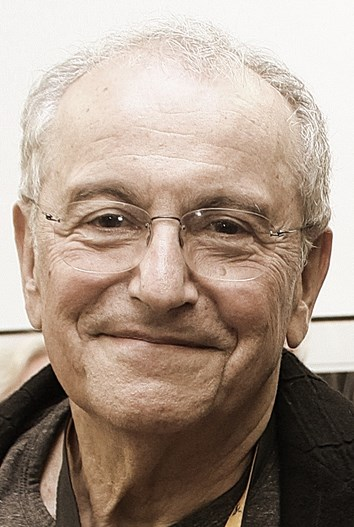
- Horowitz in 2014
- Born: May 5, 1939 (age 87); Kraków, Poland
- Known for: Photography
- Style: Surrealism, Photo composition
- Spouse: Anna Bogusz (m. 1974)
- Children: 2
- Website: www.ryszardhorowitz.com

Ryszard Horowitz (born May 5, 1939) is a Polish-born American photographer recognized as a pioneer of special effects photography that predates digital imaging.

== Early life ==
Horowitz was born in Kraków, Poland on May 5, 1939. Four months later, because they were Jewish, Ryszard's entire family was forced into ghettos following the German invasion of Poland. From September 1944, he was imprisoned at the Auschwitz concentration camp and later became known as one of the youngest known people to survive Auschwitz and be included on Schindler's list. At war's end, five-year old Ryszard was found in an orphanage by his mother and reunited with his family. His was among the few Jewish families to re-establish themselves in Krakow.

Horowitz began taking pictures at the age of fourteen. For a brief period, he grew up alongside Roman Polański, with whom he created his first photographic enlarger from cardboard.

== Career ==
In 1956, the Polish government began awarding subsidies to encourage new and original art forms; Kraków suddenly emerged as a center of avant-garde jazz, painting, theater and filmmaking. For two years, beginning in 1959, Ryszard studied art at the High School of Fine Arts in Kraków and then went on to major in painting at the Academy of Fine Arts. It was at this time that he became interested in photography, particularly the work of American photographers.

Jazz was of particular interest to Horowitz as a photography student. He photo-documented the birth of Polish Jazz, and in 1958, photographed jazz legends such as Dave Brubeck, Louis Armstrong, Count Basie, Duke Ellington, and Sonny Rollins at the Newport Jazz Festival in the U.S.

Horowitz immigrated to the United States in 1959 and enrolled at New York's Pratt Institute in its commercial and advertising graphic design department. There he worked with his mentors, Richard Avedon and Alexey Brodovitch. Horowitz took part in weekly seminars led by Brodovitch and worked as an assistant for Avedon in 1963, including at his famous portrait session with Salvador Dalí. After graduating from Pratt in 1962, Horowitz began working in film and television and graphic design companies, including a stint as Art Director for Grey Advertising.

In 1967, Horowitz opened his own photography studio in New York City. He has developed a successful career in both fine art and commercial photography, but is most well-known for creating complex photographic composites, which have been compared to the surrealist artworks of Magritte and Dalí. Early in his career, to obtain such effects, Horowitz used a multitude of photographic techniques such as darkroom retouching, multiple film exposures and manipulation of his camera.

The 2021 documentary film Polanski, Horowitz. Hometown, directed by Mateusz Kudła and Anna Kokoszka-Romer, telling the story of the childhood and youth of Ryszard Horowitz and his friend Roman Polanski, whom he met in the Krakow ghetto.

== Recognition ==
In 2017, Horowitz was inducted into the International Photography Hall of Fame and Museum.

== In popular culture ==
Horowitz was depicted as a child in Steven Spielberg's epic drama Schindler's List - a film about Oskar Schindler, a German businessman who saved over a thousand Polish-Jewish refugees during the Holocaust. Horowitz, along with other Schindlerjuden, appears in the final scene as mourners at Schindler's grave in Jerusalem.

Horowitz's photographs appear on the cover of both Dot Hacker's 2014 How's Your Process albums. Because of his unique style, Horowitz was asked to produce the cover for the premier issue of Nuestro magazine in 1977.

== Personal life ==
In 1974, Horowitz married Anna Bogusz, an architect. They have two sons, Daniel and Emil.
