= I Don't Feel Well =

Studio album by Pluralone
- Released: October 16, 2020
- Recorded: June 22 – July 17, 2020
- Studios: Palmquist Studios, El Sereno, California
- Length: 44:54
- Label: ORG Music
- Producer: Eric Palmquist

Pluralone chronology
To Be One with You (2019)	I Don't Feel Well (2020)	Mother Nature EP (2021)

Singles from I Don't Feel Well
- 1. "The Night Won't Scare Me" Released: September 22, 2020; 2. "The Report" Released: October 14, 2020

Pluralone studio album chronology
To Be One with You (2019)	I Don't Feel Well (2020)	This Is the Show (2022)

I Don't Feel Well is the second studio album from multi-instrumentalist and songwriter Josh Klinghoffer, under the pseudonym of Pluralone. The album was recorded and released a year after his debut album To Be One with You.

As on his debut album, Klinghoffer performs most of the instruments except for a few guest artists: Jack Irons, who appears on drums for "Red Don’t Feel", "The Night Won’t Scare Me", "Carry" and "Plank"; bassist Steven Shane McDonald (Redd Kross and Off!) featured on the song "Mother Nature"; Billy Mohler performs double bass on the song "I Hear You".

"The Night Won’t Scare Me" was released as the first single on the ORG Music label SoundCloud profile through a Rolling Stone article.

The album was released on vinyl (also a limited colored edition of a gold vinyl), CD and digitally.

== Background ==
Along with the release of "The Night Won't Scare Me", an interview with Klinghoffer was published in Rolling Stone in which he mentioned that he began work on the album in March 2020, when the COVID-19 pandemic was at its peak in United States. Klinghoffer mentions that during this time, unlike his debut album, he was able to fully concentrate on writing and recording an album in the same period of time.

Klinghoffer released a statement about the album's release, saying: "This album was made during and amongst some very new experiences. I hope it captures some of how it felt during this period. I'll feel better when this is behind".

The day of the album's release, Klinghoffer commented on it via Twitter and Instagram: "There is a hell of a lot of noise out there so I apologize for adding to the pile of it, but, my hope is it makes you feel a little bit calmer, a little bit safer, and a little bit more at peace".

== Music ==
About the first single of the album "The Night Won't Scare Me", Klinghoffer told Rolling Stone that the song began with a chord progression that he originally composed for the Red Hot Chili Peppers, but the track was completed "in a burst of creativity" after his departure.

"The Report" was released as the second single, about the song Klinghoffer said that was written the day that William Barr made his "obfuscation performance" about the Mueller Report. "I think I was sitting in bed, watching that scumbag blather, and playing chords that sounded like the image of spiders crawling out of his eyes. That wretched man. That's where the music was born," Klinghoffer told Spin. The song changed and finally ended up being a report regarding his state of mind in the present year, for a time was named after the album title.

== Outtakes ==
As like their debut album, Klinghoffer released a series of B-sides from the I Don't Feel Well sessions. The first series was released on April 22 on the digital Mother Nature EP released in the Earth Day, which includes two new versions of Mother Nature; the (re-recorded 2) version is featuring Dot Hacker members and Eric Avery while the (re-recorded 1) has the participation of Jack Irons, Steve McDonald and Nick Reinhart. The EP also includes the unreleased songs "Stretch The Truth", "Green & Gold", "Wile" and "Remembered".

On September 29, two new B-sides was released, the songs "Across the Park" and "Sevens". On the same day, the release of 7" special colored vinyls editions with all non-album tracks was also announced. They are available separately and in a limited edition bundle.

== Track listing ==
All music is composed by Josh Klinghoffer

Side A
No.	Title	Length
1.	"Red Don't Feel"	4:34
2.	"The Night Won't Scare Me"	5:33
3.	"Carry"	3:44
4.	"The Report"	4:16
5.	"Steal Away"	4:12

Side B
No.	Title	Length
6.	"Mother Nature"	4:29
7.	"Knowing You"	4:32
8.	"Plank"	4:49
9.	"Don't Have To"	3:25
10.	"I Hear You"	5:20
Total length:		44:54

== B-Sides ==
Black 7" Vinyl
No.	Title	Length
1.	"Across The Park"	3:46
2.	"Sevens"	4:47
Total length:		8:32

Olive Green 7" Vinyl
No.	Title	Length
1.	"Stretch The Truth"	3:37
2.	"Green & Gold"	1:36
Total length:		5:14

Purple 7" Vinyl
No.	Title	Length
1.	"Wile"	4:57
2.	"Remembered"	4:00
Total length:		8:57

== Personnel ==
Credits adapted from Pluralone website.

- Josh Klinghoffer – lead vocals, guitar, keyboards, bass, drums
- Jack Irons – drums (tracks 1, 2, 8. Additional drumming on track 3, Sevens)
- Steven Shane McDonald – bass (additional bass on track 6)
- Vanessa Freebairn-Smith – cello (tracks 5, 10, Across The Park)
- Paul Cartwright – violin (tracks 5, 8,10, Across The Park)
- Andrew Duckles – viola (tracks 5, 8,10)
- Billy Mohler – double bass (tracks 5, 8,10)
- Nate Walcott – strings (written & arranged on tracks 5, 8, 10, Across The Park)
- Kate Elkan – design
- Nora Shazlin – cover photo
