= Josh Klinghoffer =

American musician (born 1979)

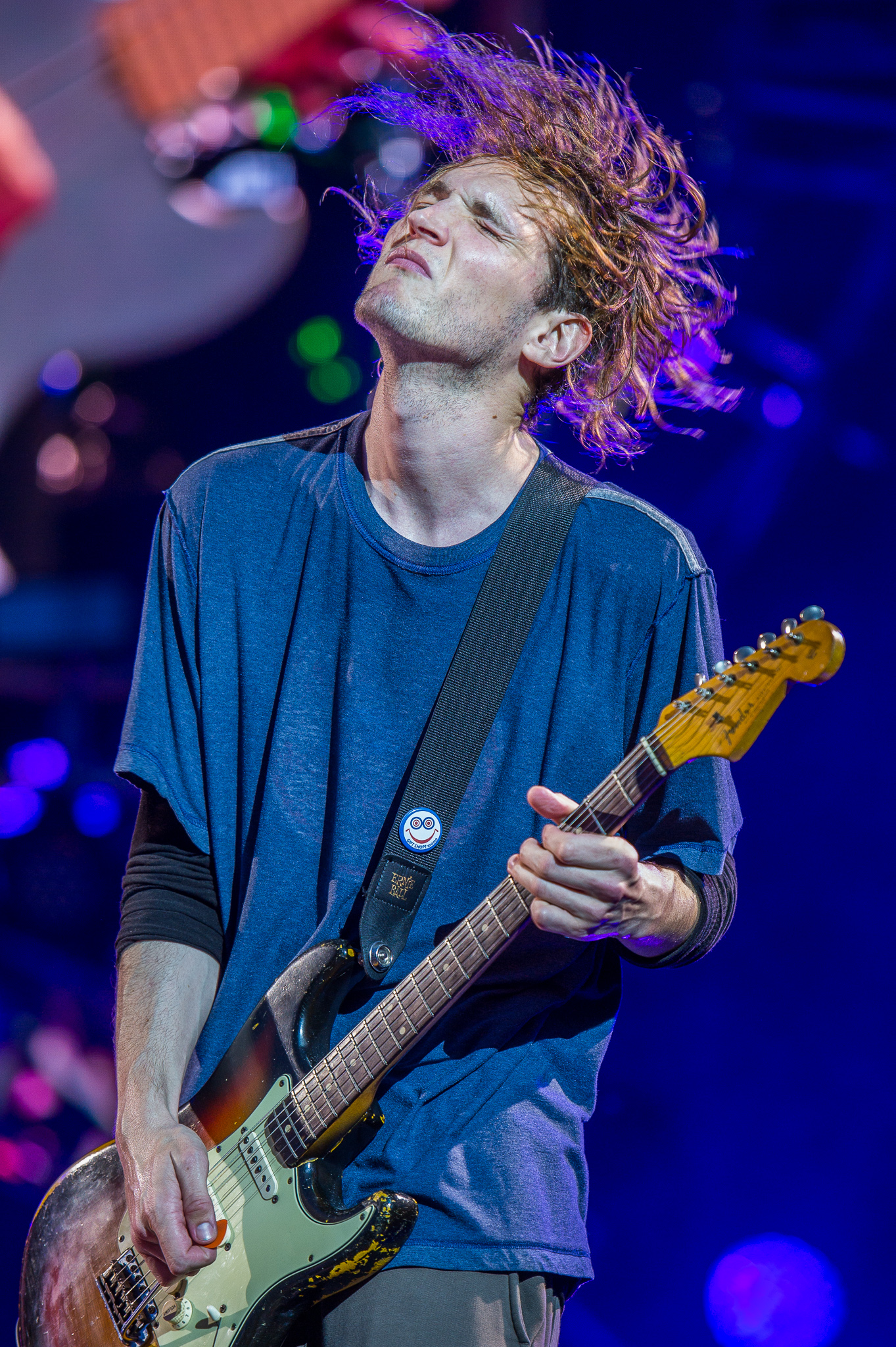
- Klinghoffer performing with Red Hot Chili Peppers at Rock im Park 2016

Background information
- Also known as: Pluralone
- Born: Josh Adam Klinghoffer; October 3, 1979 (age 47)
- Origin: Santa Monica, California, U.S.
- Genres: Experimental rock; alternative rock; avant-garde; electronica; art rock; funk rock; post-rock
- Occupations: Musician; singer; songwriter; producer
- Instruments: Guitar; vocals; drums; keyboards; bass
- Years active: 1995–present
- Member of: Dot Hacker; The Bicycle Thief; Pearl Jam (touring)
- Formerly of: Red Hot Chili Peppers; Ataxia; Thelonious Monster; Jane's Addiction (touring); Sparks; Warpaint; Golden Shoulders; Butthole Surfers

Josh Adam Klinghoffer (born October 3, 1979) is an American musician best known for being the guitarist for the rock band Red Hot Chili Peppers from 2009 to 2019, with whom he recorded two studio albums, I'm with You (2011) and The Getaway (2016), and the B-sides compilation I'm Beside You (2013). Klinghoffer took the place of his friend and frequent collaborator John Frusciante in 2009, after a period as the band's touring rhythm guitarist. At age 32, Klinghoffer was inducted into the Rock and Roll Hall of Fame with Red Hot Chili Peppers in 2012, making him the youngest inductee at the time.

Following his departure from Red Hot Chili Peppers in 2019, Klinghoffer became a touring and session member of both Pearl Jam (since 2021) and Jane's Addiction (2023). As a multi-instrumentalist, Klinghoffer fronts the alternative rock band Dot Hacker. He is also a former member of the bands Ataxia, Warpaint and the Bicycle Thief, and has both recorded and toured as a session musician with notable artists including PJ Harvey, Beck, Iggy Pop, Elton John, Butthole Surfers, Vincent Gallo, Sparks, Golden Shoulders, Cate Le Bon, the Armed and Redd Kross.

Additionally, Klinghoffer releases solo materials under the pseudonym of Pluralone, originally a working title for the group Dot Hacker. He has released four solo albums, To Be One with You (2019), I Don't Feel Well (2020), This Is the Show (2022) and A Drop in the Ocean (2026) plus multiple non-album singles and B-sides.

== Early and personal life ==
Josh Adam Klinghoffer was born on October 3, 1979 in Santa Monica, California.

Klinghoffer took drum lessons when he was nine, and taught himself guitar and keyboards. He is distantly related to Leon Klinghoffer, who was murdered during the Achille Lauro hijacking. He dropped out of high school at the age of 15 in 1995, focusing more on a career in music.

== Career ==
=== Early career and the Bicycle Thief (1995–2001) ===
Klinghoffer became involved in performing and recording music in Los Angeles at an early age. Klinghoffer described himself at this time as "[the] little music dork who lived around the corner, dropped out of high school, and was just playing guitar all day long." In 1997, at the age of seventeen, Klinghoffer joined the Bicycle Thief, the then-current project from former Thelonious Monster frontman Bob Forrest. Red Hot Chili Peppers vocalist Anthony Kiedis noted that "Bob [Forrest] has always had a very keen sensibility about finding extremely talented and down-to-earth people who just want to get to a kitchen and write a song." The band's subsequent studio album, You Come and Go Like a Pop Song, marked Klinghoffer's first recording experience. Regarding bandmate Forrest's notorious drug addiction, which arguably stalled Thelonious Monster's commercial success, Klinghoffer stated at this time that he: "Pretty much had enough confidence in myself to know that I wasn't gonna be 'the next Bob Forrest'." It was during the recording of Bicycle Thief album that Josh, at age 17, first met John Frusciante, who came in to record a guitar solo. The two eventually began to hang out and listen to music together at Frusciante's home.

In late 1999, the Bicycle Thief opened for Red Hot Chili Peppers, as the latter toured in support of their seventh studio album, Californication.

=== John Frusciante and Ataxia (2002–2004) ===
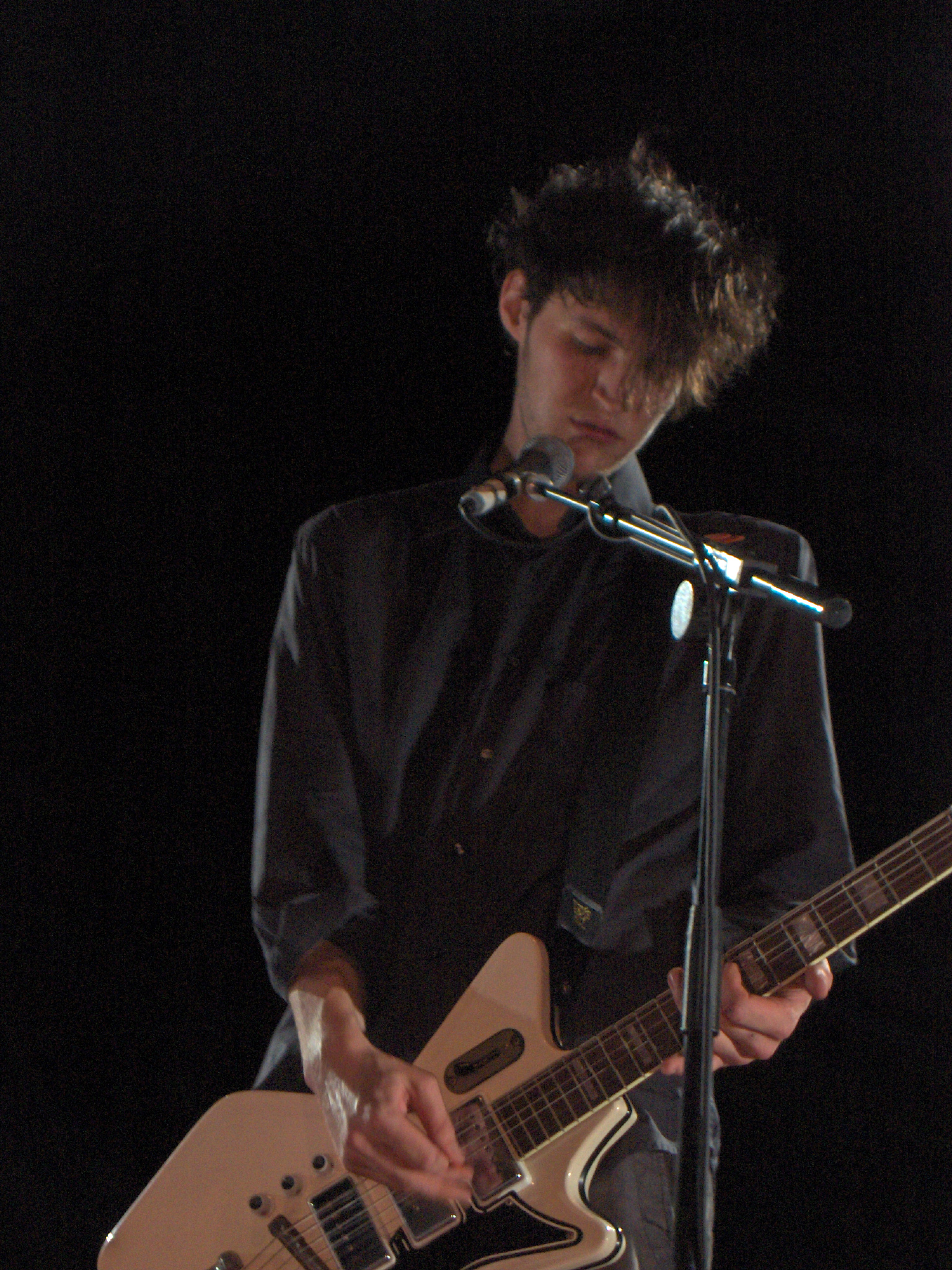
Klinghoffer performing in 2004

Klinghoffer and the Red Hot Chili Peppers guitarist John Frusciante began writing together in 2002, with the hopes of recording and releasing an album under a band name. This album was eventually released as a John Frusciante solo release in 2004, entitled Shadows Collide with People. Regarding this decision, Frusciante stated:

We had written the song "Omission" together and this song came about through collaboration. He played keyboard and I played guitar and both of us had the ideas for the vocals. [...] We sat there and scribbled our parts onto a piece of paper and when we were ready we got back together again and sung our ideas together and they fit perfectly. At that time we thought that we'd do many songs together, just like this one. As time went by, this album became more of a solo album with which he's helping me. [...] We'll do further projects where we'll work together, but we realized that these were my songs and it therefore had to be a solo album.

During the first six months of 2004, Klinghoffer continued to assist Frusciante in the studio. Klinghoffer's drums, bass, vocals, keyboards, and/or guitar can be heard on the full-length albums The Will to Death, Inside of Emptiness, and in 2009's The Empyrean. 2004's A Sphere in the Heart of Silence is also credited to both musicians, and features several tracks with Klinghoffer on vocals, lead guitar, synthesizers and sequencing. He plays drums along with Frusciante and Fugazi bassist Joe Lally in Automatic Writing and AW II, under the name Ataxia.

Frusciante commented on his relationship with Klinghoffer in 2004 stating: "He's simply a very talented person and has been a very close friend for the past four years. He's one of the very few people who I really like to spend a lot of time with. In many respects he's the person who is closest to me, and with whom I can speak honestly about everything. His opinion is very important to me and I value it a lot."

In 2004, Klinghoffer also appeared on the Thelonious Monster album, California Clam Chowder.

=== Golden Shoulders (2002–present) ===
In addition to infrequent live appearances with the band, Klinghoffer appeared on Golden Shoulders' first two albums, 2002's Let My Burden Be and 2004's Friendship Is Deep, playing bass guitar. He returned to play bass guitar, drums, electric guitar, mellotron, organ, and synthesizer on 2009's Get Reasonable, and electric guitar and piano on 2019's Could This Be the End.

=== Gnarls Barkley (2006–2008) ===
Klinghoffer was a touring and session musician for Gnarls Barkley. Klinghoffer appeared on the band's second album, 2008's The Odd Couple and was part of the band's touring lineup to support their first two studio albums which also included an opening slot for the Red Hot Chili Peppers on their Stadium Arcadium tour, a tour Klinghoffer would eventually join as a backing musician in 2007.

=== Dot Hacker (2008–present) ===
Klinghoffer founded his own band, Dot Hacker, in 2008, where he holds the position of primary songwriter, singer, rhythm guitarist and pianist. The group is made up of former touring musicians for Gnarls Barkley. In 2012, they released their first full-length album, Inhibition. The title track to Inhibition was first played in a Bob Forrest radio show. A previously unreleased track, "Rewire", was also included in their digital-only 4-song self-titled EP.

Dot Hacker released a two-album series in 2014, with How's Your Process? (Work) being released on July 1, 2014, and the second album, How's Your Process? (Play), being released on October 7, 2014. The band played at The Chapel, San Francisco, in July 2014 and Los Angeles in August 2014. The band announced plans to play Tokyo in February 2015 in support of the two albums. This was their first time performing outside of the United States. Dot Hacker released their third album, Nº3, on January 20, 2017.

=== Red Hot Chili Peppers (2007–2019) ===
In 2007, Klinghoffer played with Red Hot Chili Peppers on the final few legs of their Stadium Arcadium tour, playing additional guitar, backing vocals, and keyboard parts alongside the band. His first show with the band took place on March 12, 2007, at the Cox Convention Center Arena in Oklahoma City. On May 8, 2009, amidst confusion as to whether Frusciante still remained within Red Hot Chili Peppers, Klinghoffer, Anthony Kiedis, Flea, Chad Smith, Ron Wood and Ivan Neville performed under the name the Insects at a MusiCares benefit in honor of Kiedis's commitment to helping those struggling with addiction and recovery.

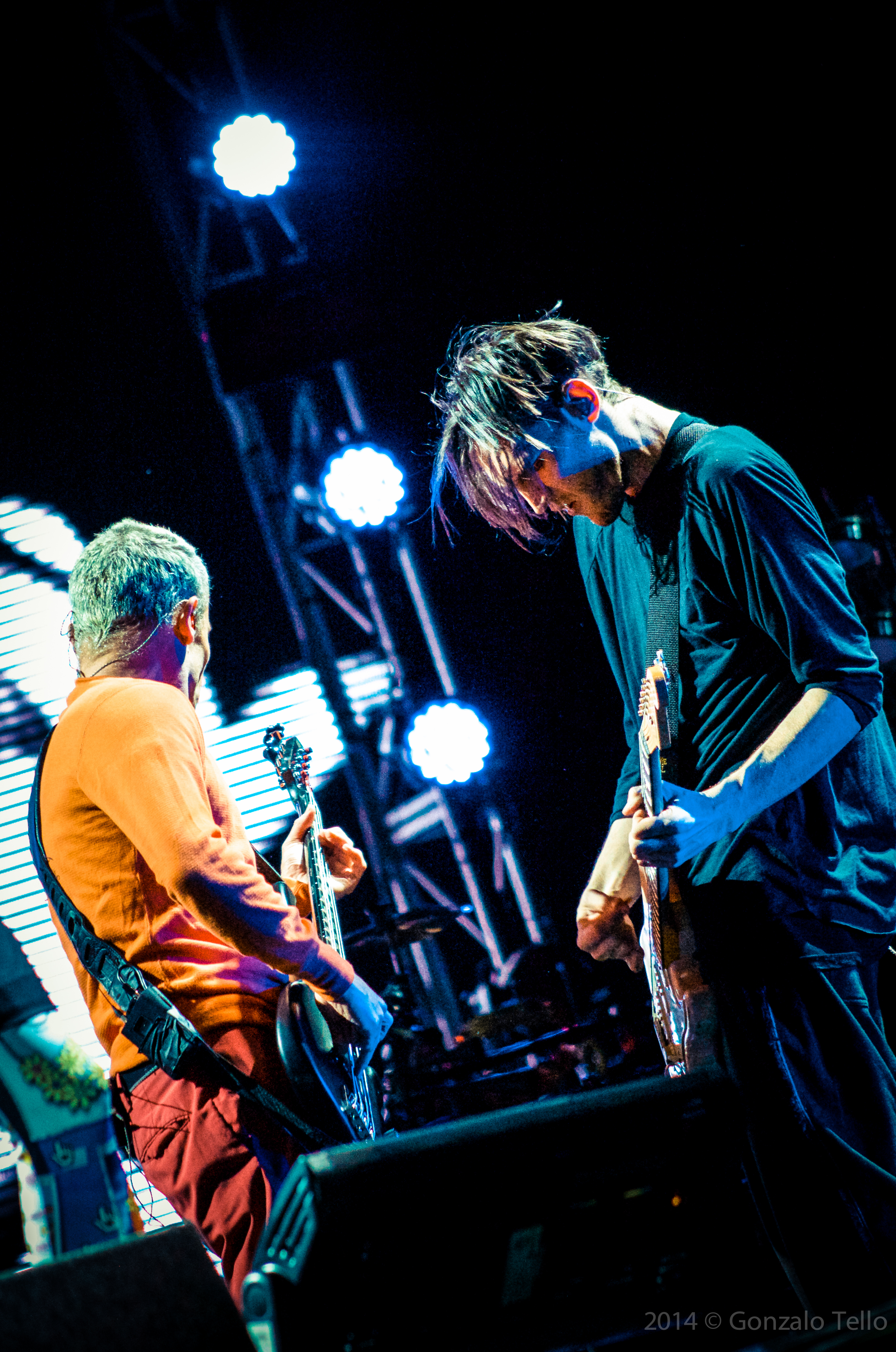
With Red Hot Chili Peppers bassist Flea at Lollapalooza Chile, 2014

In 2009, the Chili Peppers ended a two-year hiatus, and were joined by Klinghoffer in the studio to begin work on their tenth album, I'm with You. At the time, unbeknownst to the public, Frusciante had already quit the band earlier that year without announcing his departure. In January 2010, Klinghoffer performed with the band for the first time as their lead guitarist at a MusiCares tribute event to Neil Young for a performance of Young's "A Man Needs a Maid". It was later revealed he would permanently replace Frusciante as guitarist. Klinghoffer was officially named the replacement for John Frusciante in early 2010. Regarding his entry into the band, Klinghoffer notes, "I've always been attracted to the idea of a tight-knit unit, a band of family, a brotherhood. Since my earliest memory, they always seemed like a band with a lot of love for each other."

In May 2010, Klinghoffer along with Flea performed the United States national anthem at a Lakers home playoff game during the NBA Western Conference finals series against the Phoenix Suns.

After eleven months of writing and rehearsing, the Chili Peppers began recording a new album, I'm with You, on September 13, 2010. Klinghoffer also sang, wrote music, played the drums and keyboard on the album. Recording was completed on March 18, 2011, and the album was released on August 29, 2011. The album's first single was "The Adventures of Rain Dance Maggie".

In 2011, Klinghoffer wrote and performed the original score for the documentary Bob and the Monster. Klinghoffer also appears in the documentary, which is based on the life and career of musician and drug counselor Bob Forrest. Klinghoffer was said to have contributed to at least one track on former Jane's Addiction bassist Eric Avery's second solo album, LIFE.TIME. (2013), although the album did not include it. On July 10, 2011, Klinghoffer appeared at the 2011 School of Rock's Rock the House Tour which also featured Keith Morris and Page Hamilton. Klinghoffer joined the School of Rock kids on stage to perform Red Hot Chili Peppers songs "Dani California" and "Give It Away". This was the first time he performed any of the Chili Peppers' songs live since officially joining the band as their guitarist.

In April 2012, Klinghoffer was inducted into the Rock and Roll Hall of Fame as a member of the Red Hot Chili Peppers at 32 years of age. This made him the youngest ever inductee until 2020, when he was surpassed by Nine Inch Nails drummer Ilan Rubin.

In January 2015, Klinghoffer returned to the studio with the Chili Peppers to begin work on their eleventh studio album which would be produced by Gnarls Barkley's Danger Mouse. Recording was put on hold the following month when bassist Flea suffered an injury during a skiing trip. Production resumed in August 2015 and The Getaway was released on June 17, 2016, which was followed by an extensive world tour that concluded in October 2017.

Work on Klinghoffer's album To Be One with You was announced in September 2018, with plans to release it sometime in 2019. However, the recording was delayed due to the Woolsey Fire.

On November 2, 2019, the band performed a charity event at the Silverlake Conservatory of Music in Los Angeles. This would be the band's final show with Klinghoffer.

On December 15, 2019, the Chili Peppers announced via an Instagram post that Klinghoffer was parting ways with the band after ten years on good terms, and that former guitarist John Frusciante would be rejoining the band. "Josh is a beautiful musician who we respect and love. We are deeply grateful for our time with him, and the countless gifts he shared with us. We also announce, with great excitement and full hearts, that John Frusciante is rejoining our group. Thank you." the band's statement read.

In an interview released on January 18, 2020, by Ultimate Guitar, Klinghoffer spoke briefly for the first time about his departure from the band. Klinghoffer said that he could not go into detail about his departure but when asked if there was any hard feelings between him, the band or Frusciante he responded by saying "I don't think so. Not from me." However, in June 2022, he admitted that the friendship between him and Frusciante was "non-existent" and that they had not spoken in over 10 years, while maintaining that he had no hard feelings towards the rest of the band.

Klinghoffer on January 23, 2020, gave an interview with Marc Maron on the WTF with Marc Maron podcast where, for the first time, he discussed in detail his firing from the band. Klinghoffer described the meeting with the band as being "really sweet" and that “I rode my bike over [to Flea’s house]. They just said, 'We’ll get right to it. We’ve decided to ask John to come back to the band' And I just sat there quiet for a second and I said, ‘I’m not surprised.’ And the only thing I could think to say was, ‘I wish I could have done something with you guys, musically or creatively, that would have made this an absolute impossibility.” Klinghoffer said that “It’s absolutely John’s place to be in that band. So that’s why I’m happy for him, I’m happy that he’s back with them.” The news of his firing did however come as a “complete shock but not a surprise” as he had known Frusciante had been jamming with Flea in recent months and that Anthony Kiedis was also recently in contact with him. “John and Flea have a musical language. I’ll never be able to contend with the history him and John had.” Klinghoffer also discussed Frusciante's departure in 2009 saying “We had been friends and working together. When they decided they wanted to carry on and he maintained he was sort of done with it, and they asked me to do it, I think he was really surprised that they were going to carry on without him… It was sort of a strange position I was holding.” Klinghoffer maintained that he was fine with the decision and there was "no animosity" between him and the band. “If John coming back had happened five years ago, it would have been hard for me, temporally, to weigh [my contributions] against what they had. Now, after 10 years, two tours, and almost three albums of writing, I’m really proud of what I did with them. I feel like we did create something.”

On January 31, 2020, Klinghoffer was interviewed by Rolling Stone and opened up much more about his firing. Klinghoffer said "I love those guys deeply. I never saw myself as deserving to be there over John." He further discussed the moments when he found out he was being fired saying "It was mostly Flea talking. Anthony didn’t say much. But I can see in his eyes that it was a very painful decision. And I think of Anthony as a very tender and supportive person. We all hugged and Chad texted me before I even got home. He was really heartbroken about the whole thing because Chad and I are very good friends." Klinghoffer said that he was unaware of the band's statement on his firing and said "I was totally surprised. And it does look exactly like a death announcement." Klinghoffer also discussed the two albums he recorded while in the band saying "I’m not particularly fond of the two records. I liked the songs and I think we wrote some really cool songs together, but I’m such a pain in the ass. Rick Rubin was the producer [on I’m With You]. And the reason why I didn’t want to work with him the second time [the band was in talks for Rubin to produce the new album] was because I felt like those four had a relationship and I was the odd man out."

=== As Pluralone (2019–present) ===
On August 16, 2019, Klinghoffer released his first solo single "Io Sono Quel Che Sono B/W Menina Mulher Da Pele Preta" under the name Pluralone. The single was made available on vinyl on August 30, 2019. The album featured two covers of non-English songs; "Io Sono Quel Che Sono" is a cover of Italian singer Mina, and "Menina Mulher Da Pele Preta" is by Brazilian singer Jorge Ben. Klinghoffer performed all instruments and vocals across these two tracks, with album art by Dot Hacker partner Eric Gardner.

Klinghoffer released a follow-up album titled To Be One with You on November 22, 2019, under the name Pluralone. The album features guest appearances from Flea and Red Hot Chili Peppers alum Jack Irons. Members of Klinghoffer's band Dot Hacker also appeared along with former Jane's Addiction bassist Eric Avery.

His live debut as a solo artist was going to be opening shows to Pearl Jam as part of the North American leg of Gigaton Tour. The tour dates were scheduled to begin on March 18, 2020, but were postponed due to the COVID-19 pandemic, with an intent to reschedule at a later date.

On August 21, 2020, Klinghoffer performed the Clash's "Rudie Can't Fail" during A Song for Joe: Celebrating the Life of Joe Strummer, a live stream tribute to Joe Strummer on what would have been his 68th birthday.

On September 22, 2020, the release of his second album as Pluralone, I Don't Feel Well, was announced; as a preview the song "The Night Won't Scare Me" was released on digital platforms. The album will be released in vinyl (with a limited edition gold vinyl), CD and digital.

On January 26, 2022, the release of his third studio album, This Is the Show, was announced, with the first single "Claw Your Way Out" coming to digital outlets that day. The album was released on black vinyl, clear colour vinyl, CD, and digital. Additional singles for "Offend" and "Fight For The Soul" were released with videos.

On June 12th 2026, Klinghoffer released 'A Drop in the Ocean, his first solo album in 4 years. The album contained the singles "I Hope You Knew", "Ranting and Raving" and "Peer Into Your Dreams" The album is available on streaming services and CD

=== Pearl Jam (2020–present) ===
On January 21, 2020, Pearl Jam announced Klinghoffer, under the Pluralone name, was set to "support Pearl Jam on the Spring 2020 tour dates", before the band announced the tour postponement in March. Klinghoffer made his debut with Pearl Jam as a multi-instrumentalist touring musician once the band resumed performing live at the Sea.Hear.Now Festival on September 18, 2021. His involvement with the band was aimed particularly to help flesh out the live versions of songs from Pearl Jam's new album Gigaton. He also performed in the recordings of Eddie Vedder’s album Earthling and as a member of Vedder’s backing band, the Earthlings, at The Ohana Festival in Dana Point, CA, and toured with them in February 2022. Josh also filled in as Pearl Jam's drummer on September 13, 2023 when the band's drummer Matt Cameron could not perform due to contracting COVID-19.

=== Current and upcoming projects and session work ===
Klinghoffer appears on seven songs on Iggy Pop's 2022 album, Every Loser. He also co-wrote two songs on the album. To promote the album, Klinghoffer will be part of Pop's backing band called the Losers which consists of his former Red Hot Chili Peppers bandmate, Chad Smith, Duff McKagan and Andrew Watt.

Klinghoffer, Chad Smith, and Flea collaborated with Morrissey on his upcoming album Bonfire of Teenagers, which was supposed to be released in February 2023, but in December 2022 it was announced that its future is in limbo, as Capitol Records has decided not to release it.

After making guest appearances with the group in 2022, Klinghoffer was announced as the touring guitarist for Jane's Addiction in 2023, filling in for longtime member Dave Navarro (coincidentally a former member of Red Hot Chili Peppers himself), who was ill with long COVID. Navarro returned to the band for its 2024 European shows, with Klinghoffer receiving a writing credit on the band's single 2024 single, "True Love", which he had performed live with the band during his touring tenure.

After producing and performing on Redd Kross's self-titled 2024 album, Klinghoffer and his former Red Hot Chili Peppers bandmate Chad Smith featured as the backing band on Elton John and Brandi Carlile's forthcoming 2025 studio album, Who Believes in Angels?. Klinghoffer and Smith also joined John and Carlile for their special television concert An Evening with Elton John and Brandi Carlile that aired on CBS on April 6, 2025.

== Legal issues ==
=== 2024 motor vehicle collision ===
On March 18, 2024, Klinghoffer was involved in a vehicular collision that killed a pedestrian in Alhambra, California, when behind the wheel of a black GMC Yukon. Klinghoffer made a left turn and struck 47-year old Israel Sanchez, who was using the pedestrian crosswalk at the time. According to TMZ, Sanchez "was dragged across the asphalt as a result of the collision and sustained blunt force trauma to his head, injuries that ultimately killed him only hours later". Klinghoffer was sued for negligence and wrongful death, with Sanchez' family alleging that he was using a phone at the time of the collision, and that Klinghoffer had failed to deploy his brakes. According to police, Klinghoffer was on his cell phone when the incident happened and his GMC Yukon had no license plates. Video shows Klinghoffer pulling over after hitting Sanchez, walking over to the body and then turning around and quickly walking back to the car. Klinghoffer's attorney told Rolling Stone "Josh immediately pulled over, stopped the vehicle, called 911, and waited until police and the ambulance arrived. He is fully cooperating with the traffic investigation." Nick Rowley, the attorney for the family said in a statement on behalf of the family that "Mr. Klinghoffer should be arrested and prosecuted for homicide. We have a video of him on his cell phone at the time he hit and killed Israel Sanchez, a loving father, in a crosswalk."

On August 29, 2024, Klinghoffer was charged with vehicular manslaughter without gross negligence, a misdemeanor that carries a maximum penalty of one year in jail and a $1,000 fine. Klinghoffer was not accused of any violent intent, but rather a failure to yield. On September 26, 2024, Klinghoffer, on behalf of his lawyer, was arraigned and pleaded not guilty to the charges.

On May 29, 2025, it was reported that Klinghoffer reached a plea deal to avoid any jail time. Klinghoffer appeared in an Alhambra courtroom and pleaded no contest to misdemeanor vehicular manslaughter without gross negligence. He was sentenced to one year of informal probation and 60 days of community labor, and was further ordered to complete a driver safety class and pay restitution. The family of the victim filed a civil suit against Klinghoffer, alleging that he was using a cell phone at the time of the incident; the hearing was scheduled for July 2025, although it has not been publicly reported on as of May 2026.

== Instruments and sound ==
=== Guitars ===
Klinghoffer has used a wide variety of instruments over the course of his career, but he generally prefers Fender Stratocasters.

As of 2017, he took these guitars on tour:

- "Dashiell", a sunburst 1960 Stratocaster
- "Chick", a sunburst 1959 Stratocaster
- "Gus", a black 1974 Stratocaster with a hardtail bridge
- "Monty", a pink Fender Custom Shop Master Built Stratocaster
- A white Fender Custom Shop Stratocaster with a gold pickguard
- A sunburst 1967 Telecaster, a gift from John Frusciante
- A black 1974 Starcaster tuned to E-flat
- "White Chicken", a white semi-hollow Fender Custom Shop one-off
- A sunburst 1965 Firebird VII
- A sunburst 1966 Firebird V-12

Klinghoffer has also previously used:

- Chad Smith's tobacco sunburst 1963 Stratocaster
- A black 1966 Stratocaster with a 1968 neck
- A white Gretsch White Penguin
- An early 1970s Gibson ES-335
- A 'custom color' 1964 Fender Jaguar
- A burnt orange Fender Coronado 12-string
- A "Fool's Telemaster" (Telecaster/Jazzmaster hybrid)
- A late 1970s Soviet electric guitar Ural 650A

=== Effects ===
Klinghoffer regularly changes his effects setup, but as of early 2017, his pedal board consists of:

- Catalinbread CSIDMAN glitch/stutter delay
- Electro-Harmonix Deluxe Memory Man
- Holy Grail Nano
- Death by Audio Interstellar Overdriver
- Xotic Effects EP Booster
- Boss DM-2 delay
- Boss DD-3 delay
- Boss DD-6 delay
- Boss VB-2 vibrato
- Boss CE-2 chorus
- Boss RV-5 reverb
- Boss DS-2 distortion
- Boss FS-5L footswitch
- Tone Bender MK 1.5
- Klon Centaur
- Robot Pedal Factory Brain Freeze filter
- Electro-Harmonix B9 Organ Machine
- Ibanez AF201 auto filter
- BS10 Bass Stack stomps
- Xotic Effects SP Compressor
- Wampler Tumnus
- JHS Firefly Fuzz
- Boss SP-1 Spectrum parametric EQ
- Line 6 FM4 Filter Modeler
- EHX Cathedral
- Electro-Harmonix Memory Boy
- EarthQuaker Devices Dispatch Master
- Boss PS-3 Pitch Shifter/Delay
- Electro-Harmonix Holy Grail Reverb
- Misty Cave Echo

=== Amplifiers ===
As of early 2017, Klinghoffer uses two amplifiers for touring – a 1970s Marshall Major for his low end, and a Fender Tone-Master for his high end.

== Tours ==
- The Bicycle Thief (2000) – guitar
- Vincent Gallo (2001) – guitar, bass, piano
- Butthole Surfers (2001) – guitar
- Jon Brion (2002) – guitar
- Beck (2003) – guitar
- Golden Shoulders (2003) – bass
- PJ Harvey (2004) – guitar, drums
- Sparks (2006–2008) – guitar
- Gnarls Barkley (2006–2008) – guitar, synthesiser, vocals
- Red Hot Chili Peppers (2007, official member 2009–2019) – guitar, vocals, six-string bass, synthesiser, drums, percussion
- Pearl Jam (2021–present) – guitar, vocals, percussion
- Jane's Addiction (2023)

== Discography ==
- as Josh Klinghoffer
  - Bob and the Monster Original Score (2013)
- as Pluralone
  - "Io Sono Quel Che Sono b/w Menina Mulher Da Pele Preta" (2019)
  - To Be One with You (2019)
  - "You Don't Know What You're Doing b/w Overflowing" (2020)
  - "Obscene b/w Fairy Tale" (2020)
  - "Nowhere I Am b/w Directrix" (2020)
  - I Don't Feel Well (2020)
  - Mother Nature (EP, 2021)
  - "Stretch the Truth b/w Green & Gold" (digital, 2021/7", 2022)
  - "Wile b/w Remembered" (digital, 2021/7", 2022)
  - "Across the Park b/w Sevens" (digital, 2021/7", 2022)
  - This Is the Show (2022)
  - "Pluralball" (7", 2022)
  - Under the Banner of Heaven (Original FX Limited Series Soundtrack) (2022) with Jeff Ament
  - A Drop in the Ocean (2026)
  - TBA (2026)
- with Dot Hacker
  - Dot Hacker (EP, 2012)
  - Inhibition (2012)
  - How's Your Process? (Work) (2014)
  - How's Your Process? (Play) (2014)
  - Nº3 (2017)
  - "Divination" b/w "Divination" (pre-production) (2021)
  - "Neon Arrow" b/w "Rewire" (2021)
- with Chad Smith
  - "Jeepster/Monolith" (2019) (Record Store Day exclusive 7")
- with Red Hot Chili Peppers
  - I'm with You (2011)
  - Red Hot Chili Peppers Live: I'm with You (2011)
  - Official Bootlegs (2011–2018)
  - 2011 Live EP (2012)
  - Rock & Roll Hall of Fame Covers EP (2012)
  - I'm with You Sessions (2012–2013)
  - I'm Beside You (2013)
  - The Getaway (2016)
  - Live in Paris EP (2016)
- with John Frusciante
  - Shadows Collide with People (2004)
  - The Will to Death (2004)
  - Automatic Writing as Ataxia (2004)
  - Inside of Emptiness (2004)
  - A Sphere in the Heart of Silence (2004) (credited to both Frusciante and Klinghoffer)
  - AW II as Ataxia (2007)
  - The Empyrean (2009)
- with Bob Forrest
  - You Come and Go Like a Pop Song as the Bicycle Thief (1999)
  - California Clam Chowder as Thelonious Monster (2004)
  - Modern Folk and Blues: Wednesday as Bob Forrest (2006)
  - Rare as The Bicycle Thief (2014)
  - Bob Forrest + Friends Live 2016 (2017)
  - Birthday Cake Rarities as the Bicycle Thief (2020)
  - Oh That Monster as Thelonious Monster (2020)
- with Golden Shoulders
  - Let My Burden Be (2002)
  - Friendship Is Deep (2004)
  - Get Reasonable (2009)
  - Could This Be the End (2019)
- Other appearances
  - Song Yet to Be Sung – Perry Farrell (2001) ("Did You Forget")
  - Blowback – Tricky (2001)
  - The Roads Don't Love You – Gemma Hayes (2005)
  - Dog Problems – The Format (2006)
  - The Peel Sessions 1991–2004 – PJ Harvey (2006) ("You Come Through")
  - A Loveletter to the Transformer / The Diary of Ic Explura Pt. 1 – Toni Oswald (2007)
  - Nun Lover! – Spleen (2007)
  - The Deep Blue – Charlotte Hatherley (2007)
  - Stainless Style – Neon Neon (2008)
  - The Odd Couple – Gnarls Barkley (2008)
  - The Blue God – Martina Topley-Bird (2008)
  - Exquisite Corpse – Warpaint (2008)
  - Chains – Pocahaunted (2008)
  - The Silence of Love – Headless Heroes (2008)
  - The Last Laugh – Joker's Daughter (2009)
  - "GJ and the PimpKillers" – Bambi Lee Savage (2009)
  - Pop Killer – Paul Oakenfold (2010)
  - The Danger of Light – Sophie Hunger (2012)
  - Emmaar – Tinariwen (2014)
  - Nothing Without Love – Nate Ruess (2015)
  - AhHa – Nate Ruess (2015)
  - Reward – Cate Le Bon (2019)
  - Earthling – Eddie Vedder (2022)
  - Chameleon Lovers – Alexia Bomtempo (2022)
  - Into the Couch – Disheveled Cuss (2022)
  - Every Loser – Iggy Pop (2023)
  - Perfect Saviors – The Armed (2023)
  - Dark Matter – Pearl Jam (2024)
  - "Imminent Redemption" / "True Love" – Jane's Addiction (2024) (writing credit on "True Love")
  - Who Believes in Angels? – Elton John & Brandi Carlile (2025)
  - Philosophy – Chelsea Hodson (2026)
