= Nuestro =

The 1977 premier issue cover of Nuestro. Photographer: Ryszard Horowitz

Nuestro was the first nationally published, monthly, general-interest magazine, in English, for and about Latinos in the United States. Until this time only "special interest" magazines for Latinos existed and were written in Spanish. Latinos were an untapped and highly lucrative market. Census statistics showed that 76% of the Latino population was either bilingual or monolingual English. Philip H. Dougherty wrote: "Unlike all the other publications aimed at this market (estimated at from 2.6 million to 3.2 million households with an annual income of some $30 billion) Nuestro will be virtually entirely in English except for a brief Spanish synopsis preceding major features."

Nuestro means "Ours" in Spanish. It was conceived by businessman Daniel Lopez. In 1972 he started Nuestro Grafico Inc., in Washington with $650 in seed money ($500 from Joan Gramatte, co-owner and art director, while $150 came from Lopez).

== History ==
The first issue was published in April 1977, with a 200,000 print run. It was both a subscription and newsstand publication. The magazine was written in English, with some Spanish information for major features. Lopez chose to print in English instead of Spanish because he felt that younger Latinos spoke English more often. He marketed the magazine as the first for Latinos in English. Primary offices were in midtown Manhattan.

Lopez was publisher, while the editorial department was headed by Editor-in-Chief Charles Rivera, co-managing editors, José M. Ferrer III and Philip Herrera (former associate editors at Time), Art Director and co-founder Joan Gramatte; along with Senior Editor Dolores Prida.
