= Nᵒ3 =

Nº3

Studio album by Dot Hacker
- Released: January 20, 2017
- Recorded: 2015 at Palmquist Studios in Los Angeles, California, Rancho de la Luna, Joshua Tree, California
- Genre: Experimental rock, alternative rock
- Length: 45:33
- Label: Org Music, Smack Face Records
- Producer: Dot Hacker

Dot Hacker chronology
How's Your Process? (Play) (2014)	Nº3 (2017)

Nº3 is the third studio album by alternative rock band Dot Hacker. The album was released on January 20, 2017 on Org Music. The album cover art was created by Josh Klinghoffer although it was not originally designed for this purpose.

== Track listing ==
All tracks are written by Dot Hacker.

No.	Title	Length
1.	"C Section"	6:39
2.	"We're Going Where"	6:05
3.	"Mindwalk"	4:49
4.	"Cassandra"	4:00
5.	"Apt Mess"	5:14
6.	"Found Lost"	5:14
7.	"Forgot to Smile"	5:10
8.	"Beseech"	4:30
9.	"Minds Dying"	3:51
Total length:		45:33

== Personnel ==
Dot Hacker

- Josh Klinghoffer – lead vocals, guitar, keyboards, synthesizers
- Clint Walsh – guitar, backing vocals, synthesizers
- Jonathan Hischke – bass guitar
- Eric Gardner – drums
