= 2011 Live EP =

EP by Red Hot Chili Peppers
- Released: March 29, 2012
- Recorded: 2011
- Genre: Funk rock; alternative rock
- Length: 29:23

Red Hot Chili Peppers chronology
Official Bootlegs (2011)	2011 Live EP (2012)	Rock & Roll Hall of Fame Covers EP (2012)

2011 Live EP is a live EP by American rock band Red Hot Chili Peppers, released in 2012 through their website as a free MP3 download. As a way to celebrate the kick-off of the band's U.S. leg of their world tour, Chad Smith personally selected five of his favorite performances from the 2011 European leg of the tour for fans to download for free.

Throughout the I'm with You Tour, 72 hours after each show's completion, the band has been releasing an official bootleg of each show to their website for fans to purchase as a download.

== Track listing ==
No.	Title	Writer(s)	Length
1.	"Look Around" (recorded 11/19/11 - Birmingham, UK)	Anthony Kiedis, Flea, Chad Smith, Josh Klinghoffer	3:48
2.	"Dani California" (recorded 11/19/11 - Birmingham, UK)	Anthony Kiedis, Flea, Chad Smith, John Frusciante	5:10
3.	"Monarchy of Roses" (recorded 11/15/11 - Manchester, UK)	Anthony Kiedis, Flea, Chad Smith, Josh Klinghoffer	3:28
4.	"If You Have to Ask" (recorded 11/14/11 - Manchester, UK)	Flea, John Frusciante, Anthony Kiedis, Chad Smith	5:24
5.	"Give It Away" (recorded 12/11/11 - Milan, Italy)	Flea, John Frusciante, Anthony Kiedis, Chad Smith	10:02
Total length:			29:44

== Personnel ==
Red Hot Chili Peppers

- Anthony Kiedis – lead vocals
- Josh Klinghoffer – guitar, backing vocals
- Flea – bass, backing vocals
- Chad Smith – drums, percussion

Additional musicians

- Mauro Refosco – percussion
- Chris Warren – keyboards
