= Rock & Roll Hall of Fame Covers EP =

EP by Red Hot Chili Peppers
- Released: May 1, 2012
- Recorded: 1991–2011
- Genre: Rock
- Length: 17:13
- Label: Warner Bros.
- Producer: Rick Rubin

Red Hot Chili Peppers chronology
2011 Live EP (2012)	Rock & Roll Hall of Fame Covers EP (2012)	I'm Beside You (2013)

Rock & Roll Hall of Fame Covers EP is EP compilation by American rock band Red Hot Chili Peppers, released in 2012 through iTunes as a digital-only download. The band first announced the EP through their website on April 19, 2012, with the title We Salute You, although it was changed on the date of the release. The EP consists of six cover songs, live and in the studio, of previous Rock and Roll Hall of Fame inductees all who influenced the band. The EP was released to commemorate the band's own induction into the Rock and Roll Hall of Fame in 2012. All six songs have been previously featured on other releases by the band. Four of the six tracks had never been released digitally before.

“A Teenager in Love” was released as one of the B-Sides on the "By the Way" single, "Search and Destroy" first appeared as a B-Side on the "Give It Away" and "Under the Bridge" singles, “I Get Around” was performed during Brian Wilson’s 2005 MusiCares tribute and only a DVD performance has been released, “Suffragette City” was previously only available as a B-side to the band’s 1996 single “Aeroplane”, “Everybody Knows This Is Nowhere” was recorded live during Red Hot Chili Peppers’ 2011–2012 world tour supporting their album I'm with You and first released through the band's website on one of their official bootlegs, and "Havana Affair" first appeared on We're a Happy Family: A Tribute to Ramones. It was also available digitally as the iTunes bonus track for Stadium Arcadium upon its 2007 rerelease, but was quickly removed for unknown reasons. This release means it is available digitally once again.

== Track listing ==
No.	Title	Writer(s)	Original Artist	Length
1.	"A Teenager in Love"	Doc Pomus, Mort Shuman	Dion and the Belmonts	3:00
2.	"Havana Affair"	Dee Dee Ramone, Johnny Ramone	The Ramones	2:19
3.	"Search and Destroy"	Iggy Pop, James Williamson	The Stooges	3:32
4.	"Everybody Knows This Is Nowhere" (live)	Neil Young	Neil Young & Crazy Horse	2:17
5.	"I Get Around" (live)	Brian Wilson, Mike Love	The Beach Boys	2:19
6.	"Suffragette City" (live)	David Bowie	David Bowie	3:42
Total length:				17:09

Professional ratings
Review scores
Source	Rating
Rolling Stone	3/5 stars

== Personnel ==
Red Hot Chili Peppers

- Anthony Kiedis – lead vocals
- Josh Klinghoffer – guitar, backing vocals (4)
- Flea – bass, backing vocals
- Chad Smith – drums, percussion
- John Frusciante – guitar, backing vocals (1-3, 5), production (1)
- Dave Navarro – guitar (6)

Additional musicians

- Mauro Refosco – percussion (4)
- Chris Warren – keyboards (4)
