= Red Hot Chili Peppers Official Bootlegs =

Live album series by Red Hot Chili Peppers
- Released: November 7, 2011 – October 18, 2017
- Recorded: 2011–2018
- Genre: Alternative rock; funk rock

Red Hot Chili Peppers chronology
I'm with You (2011)	Red Hot Chili Peppers Official Bootlegs (2011)	2011 Live EP (2012)

The Red Hot Chili Peppers Official Bootlegs are a series of professionally recorded live albums by the American alternative rock band Red Hot Chili Peppers from their 2011–13 I'm with You World Tour, 2013/2014 Tour and 2016–17 The Getaway World Tour. Through the band's website, people are able to purchase each live show from the band's tours. Each show is released 72 hours after the actual performance. Over 130 shows have been released since 2011.

The band also released two free five-song MP3 downloads, titled 2011 Live EP, on March 29, 2012 and 2012–13 Live EP, on July 1, 2014 featuring songs personally selected by drummer Chad Smith from dates on the tour. On July 1, 2016 the band released Live in Paris EP exclusively through the music streaming service Deezer. On April 22, 2017, the band released a Record Store Day exclusive "Go Robot" 12" record that was limited to 5,000 copies. The 12" featured a live version of "Go Robot", which was recorded on October 18, 2016 in Paris, and "Dreams of a Samurai" which was recorded on September 28, 2016 in Madrid.

== Official Bootlegs ==
=== I'm with You World Tour ===
1. 11/7/11, O2 Arena, London, UK
2. 11/9/11, O2 Arena, London, UK
3. 11/10/11, O2 Arena, London, UK
4. 11/12/11, SECC, Glasgow, UK
5. 11/14/11, Manchester Arena, Manchester, UK
6. 11/15/11, Manchester Arena, Manchester, UK
7. 11/17/11, Motorpoint Arena, Sheffield, UK
8. 11/19/11, LG Arena, Birmingham, UK
9. 11/20/11, LG Arena, Birmingham, UK
10. 12/4/11, O2 Arena, Berlin, DEU
11. 12/5/11, Olympiahalle, Munich, DEU
12. 12/7/11, Stadthalle, Vienna, AUT
13. 12/10/11, Palaolimpico, Torino, ITA
14. 12/11/11, Forum, Milan, ITA
15. 12/13/11, Hallenstadion, Zurich, CH
16. 12/15/11, Palau Sant Jordi, Barcelona, ESP
17. 12/17/11, Palacio de Deportes de la Comunidad, Madrid, ESP
18. 3/29/12, Tampa Bay Times Forum, Tampa, FL (due to technical problems, "Brendan's Death Song" was not included)
19. 3/31/12, Amway Center, Orlando, FL
20. 4/2/12, BankAtlantic Center, Sunrise, FL
21. 4/4/12, RBC Center, Raleigh, NC
22. 4/6/12, Time Warner Cable Arena, Charlotte, NC
23. 4/7/12, Colonial Life Arena, Columbia, SC
24. 4/9/12, Greensboro Coliseum Complex, Greensboro, NC
25. 4/10/12, The Arena at Gwinnett Center, Duluth, GA
26. 4/12/12, FedEx Forum, Memphis, TN
27. 4/27/12, Air Canada Centre, Toronto, ON
28. 4/28/12, Air Canada Centre, Toronto, ON
29. 4/30/12, Scotiabank Place, Kanata, ON
30. 05/02/12, Bell Centre, Montreal, QC
31. 05/04/12, Prudential Center, Newark, NJ
32. 05/05/12, Prudential Center, Newark, NJ
33. 05/07/12, TD Garden, Boston, MA
34. 5/10/12, Verizon Center, Washington DC
35. 5/11/12, Wells Fargo Center, Philadelphia, PA
36. 5/19/12, Hangout Music Fest, Gulf Shores, AL
37. 5/25/12, Scottrade Center, St. Louis, MO
38. 5/26/12, Van Andel Arena, Grand Rapids, MI
39. 5/28/12, Allstate Arena, Rosemont, IL
40. 5/30/12, Consol Energy Center, Pittsburgh, PA
41. 6/1/12, Joe Louis Arena, Detroit, MI
42. 6/2/12, Quicken Loans Arena, Cleveland, OH
43. 6/4/12, Value City Arena, Columbus, OH
44. 6/6/12, U.S. Bank Arena, Cincinnati, OH
45. 6/7/12, KFC Yum Center, Louisville, KY
46. 6/9/12, Bonnaroo Music & Arts Festival, Manchester, TN
47. 6/23/12, Knebworth Park, Stevenage Herts, UK
48. 6/24/12, Stadium of Light, Sunderland, UK
49. 6/26/12, Croke Park, Dublin, IRE
50. 6/28/12, Goffert Park, Nijmegen, HOL
51. 6/30/12, Stade de France, Paris, FRA (due to technical difficulties, "Did I Let You Know" was not included and instead the version from 5/4/12 was added to this bootleg)
52. 7/1/12, Rock Werchter Festival, Werchter, BEL
53. 7/3/12, Stade de Suisse, Bern, SWI
54. 7/5/12, Heineken Jammin' Festival, Milan, IT
55. 7/7/12, Rock in Rio Madrid, Madrid, ES
56. 7/20/12, Petrovsky Stadium, St. Petersburg, RU
57. 7/22/12, Luzniky Stadium, Moscow, RU
58. 7/25/12, Olympisky Stadium, Kiev, UA
59. 7/27/12, Bemowo Airport, Warsaw, PL
60. 7/28/12, Kaunas Arena, Kaunas, LT
61. 7/30/12, Tallinn Song Festival Grounds, Tallinn, EE
62. 8/1/12, Ratinan Stadium, Tampere, FIN
63. 8/4/12/, Lollapalooza, Chicago, IL
64. 8/11/12, Staples Center, Los Angeles, CA
65. 8/12/12, Staples Center, Los Angeles, CA
66. 8/14/12, Oracle Arena, Oakland, CA
67. 8/15/12, Oracle Arena, Oakland, CA
68. 8/25/12, Rock im Pott, Gelsenkirchen, DE
69. 8/27/12, Synot Tip Arena, Prague, CZ
70. 8/29/12, Hippodrome, Zagreb, HR
71. 8/31/12, National Stadium, Bucharest, ROU
72. 9/1/12, Georgi Asparuhov Stadium, Sofia, BGR
73. 9/4/12, O.A.K.A. Olympic Stadium, Athens, GRC
74. 9/6/12, The Waterfront, Beirut, LBN
75. 9/8/12, Santralistanbul, Istanbul, TUR
76. 9/10/12, Hayarkon, Tel Aviv, IL
77. 9/23/12, Valley View Casino Center, San Diego, CA
78. 9/25/12, Jobing.com Arena, Glendale, AZ
79. 9/27/12, Pepsi Center, Denver, CO
80. 9/29/12, ATT Center, San Antonio, TX
81. 10/02/12, American Airlines Center, Dallas, TX
82. 10/04/12, New Orleans Arena, New Orleans, LA
83. 10/14/12, Austin City Limits Music Festival, Austin, TX
84. 10/20/12, Toyota Center, Houston, TX
85. 10/22/12, Chesapeake Energy Arena, Oklahoma City, OK
86. 10/23/12, BOK Arena, Tulsa, OK
87. 10/25/12, Verizon Arena, Little Rock, AR
88. 10/27/12, Sprint Center, Kansas City, MO
89. 10/28/12, Centurylink Center, Omaha, NE
90. 10/30/12, Target Center, Minneapolis, MN
91. 11/1/12, Bradley Center, Milwaukee, WI
92. 11/14/12, Rose Garden, Portland, OR
93. 11/15/12, KeyArena, Seattle, WA
94. 11/17/12, Rogers Arena, Vancouver, BC
95. 11/19/12, Scotiabank Saddledome, Calgary, AB
96. 11/21/12, Rexall Place, Edmonton, AB
97. 11/22/12, Rexall Place, Edmonton, AB
98. 11/24/12, Credit Union Center, Saskatoon, SK
99. 11/26/12, MTS Centre, Winnipeg, MB
100. 1/14/13, Vector Arena, Auckland, NZ
101. 1/15/13, Vector Arena, Auckland, NZ
102. 1/18/13, Showground (Big Day Out), Sydney, AU
103. 1/20/13, Parklands (Big Day Out), Gold Coast, AU
104. 1/25/13, Showground (Big Day Out), Adelaide, AU
105. 1/26/13, Flemington Racecourse (Big Day Out), Melbourne, AU
106. 1/28/13, Claremont Showgrounds (Big Day Out), Perth, AU
107. 2/2/13, The Soccer City Complex FNB Stadium, Johannesburg, ZA
108. 2/5/13, Cape Town Stadium, Cape Town, ZA
109. 3/3/13, Arena V.F.G., Guadalajara, MX
110. 3/5/13, Palacio de los Deportes, Mexico City, MX
111. 3/6/13, Palacio de los Deportes, Mexico City, MX
112. 3/9/13, Tigo Festival (Estadio Mateo Flores), Guatemala City, GT
113. 4/14/13, Coachella, Indio, CA
114. 4/21/13, Coachella, Indio, CA

=== 2013/14 Tour ===
1. 6/8/13, Orion Music + More, Detroit, MI
2. 6/21/13, FireFly Festival, Dover, DE
3. 8/5/13, Sullivan Arena, Anchorage, AK
4. 8/6/13, Sullivan Arena, Anchorage, AK
5. 8/11/13, Outside Lands, San Francisco, CA
6. 9/21/13, Music Midtown, Atlanta, GA
7. 11/2/13, Circuito Banco do Brasil Festival, Belo Horizonte, BR
8. 11/5/13, Jockey Club del Paraguay, Asunción, PY
9. 11/7/13, Anhembi Arena, Sao Paulo, BR
10. 11/9/13, Circuito Banco do Brasil Festival, Rio de Janeiro, BR
11. 2/1/14, Barclays Center, Brooklyn, NY
12. 2/23/14, International Music Festival, Clark Pampanga, PH
13. 3/29/14, Lollapalooza, Santiago, CL
14. 4/2/14, Lollapalooza, Buenos Aires, Argentina
15. 4/4/14, Festival Estereo Picnic, Bogota, COL
16. 4/6/14, Coliseo de Puerto Rico Jose Miguel Agrelot, San Juan, PR
17. 6/14/14, Isle of Wight Festival, Isle Of Wight, UK

=== The Getaway World Tour ===
1. 9/1/16, Budapest, HU
2. 9/2/16, Budapest, HU
3. 9/4/16, Prague, CZ
4. 9/6/16, Berlin, DE
5. 9/8/16, Fornebu, NO
6. 9/10/16, Stockholm, SE
7. 9/13/16, Helsinki, FI
8. 9/14/16, Helsinki, FI
9. 9/27/16, Madrid, ES
10. 9/28/16, Madrid, ES
11. 10/1/16, Barcelona, ESP
12. 10/2/16, Barcelona, ESP
13. 10/5/16, Zurich, CH
14. 10/6/16, Zurich, CH
15. 10/8/16, Bologna, IT
16. 10/10/16, Torino, IT
17. 10/11/16, Torino, IT
18. 10/15/16, Paris, FR
19. 10/16/16, Paris, FR
20. 10/18/16, Paris, FR
21. 11/1/16, Munich, DE
22. 11/3/16, Berlin, DE
23. 11/6/16, Merksem, BE
24. 11/8/16, Amsterdam, NL
25. 11/9/16, Amsterdam, NL
26. 11/11/16, Esch Alzette, LU
27. 11/14/16, Cologne, DE
28. 11/16/16, Herning, DK
29. 11/17/16, Hannover, DE
30. 11/19/16, Frankfurt, DE
31. 11/21/16, Vienna, AT
32. 12/5/16, London, GB
33. 12/6/16, London, GB
34. 12/8/16, Glasgow, GB
35. 12/10/16, Birmingham, GB
36. 12/14/16, Manchester UK
37. 12/15/16, Manchester, UK
38. 12/18/16, London, GB
39. 1/5/17, San Antonio, TX
40. 1/7/17, Houston, TX
41. 1/8/17, Dallas, TX
42. 1/10/17, New Orleans, LA
43. 1/12/17, Memphis, TN
44. 1/14/17, Tulsa, OK
45. 1/16/17, Wichita, KS
46. 1/18/17, St. Louis, MO
47. 1/20/17, Lincoln, NE
48. 1/21/17, Minneapolis, MN
49. 2/2/17, Detroit, MI
50. 2/4/17, Toronto, ON
51. 2/7/17, Boston, MA
52. 2/8/17, Boston, MA
53. 2/10/17, Buffalo, NY
54. 2/12/17, Philadelphia, PA
55. 2/13/17, Philadelphia, PA
56. 2/15/17, New York, NY
57. 2/17/17, New York, NY
58. 2/18/17, New York, NY
59. 3/7/17, Los Angeles, CA
60. 3/8/17, Los Angeles, CA
61. 3/10/17, Los Angeles, CA
62. 3/12/17, Oakland, CA
63. 3/15/17, Portland, OR
64. 3/17/17, Seattle, WA
65. 3/18/17, Vancouver, BC
66. 3/21/17, San Diego, CA
67. 4/12/17, Washington D.C.
68. 4/14/17, Atlanta, GA
69. 4/15/17, Raleigh, NC
70. 4/17/17, Charlotte, NC
71. 4/19/17, Columbia, SC
72. 4/22/17, North Little Rock, AR
73. 4/24/17, Jacksonville, FL
74. 4/26/17, Orlando, FL
75. 4/27/17, Tampa, FL
76. 4/29/17, Miami, FL
77. 5/11/17, Pittsburgh, PA
78. 5/13/17, Cleveland, OH
79. 5/14/17, Columbus, OH
80. 5/16/17, Louisville, KY
81. 5/18/17, Indianapolis, IN
82. 5/19/17, Cincinnati, OH
83. 5/21/17, Kansas City, MO
84. 5/23/17, Des Moines, IA
85. 5/26/17, Winnipeg, MB
86. 5/28/17, Edmonton, AB
87. 5/29/17, Calgary, AB
88. 6/10/17, Bonnaroo Music & Arts Festival, Manchester, TN
89. 6/20/17, Montreal, QC
90. 6/22/17, Hamilton, ON
91. 6/23/17, Ottawa, ON
92. 6/25/17, Grand Rapids, MI
93. 6/28/17, Summerfest, Milwaukee, WI
94. 6/30/17, Chicago, IL
95. 7/1/17, Chicago, IL
96. 7/13/17, Super Bock Super Rock, Lisbon
97. 7/15/17, Benicassim, Benicassim, ESP
98. 7/18/17, Paleo Festival, Nyon, CH
99. 7/20/17, Rock in Roma, Rome, IT
100. 7/21/17, Ippodromo del Galoppo di San Siro, Milan, IT
101. 7/23/17, Lollapalooza Paris, Paris, FR
102. 7/25/17, Kraków, PL
103. 7/27/17, Riga, LV
104. 7/29/17, Kaisafest, Helsinki, FI
105. 7/31/17, Reykjavik, IS
106. 9/15/17, KAABOO Festival, Del Mar, CA
107. 9/17/17, The Meadows Music & Arts Festival, New York, NY
108. 9/20/17, Dublin, IE
109. 9/21/17, Dublin, IE
110. 10/7/17, Austin City Limits, Austin, TX
111. 10/10/17, Mexico City, MX
112. 10/11/17, Mexico City, MX
113. 10/14/17, Austin City Limits, Austin, TX
114. 10/16/17, Denver, CO
115. 10/18/17, Glendale, AZ

== Personnel ==
Red Hot Chili Peppers

- Anthony Kiedis – lead vocals
- Josh Klinghoffer – guitar, backing vocals, drums, percussion, six-string bass, banjo
- Flea – bass, backing vocals
- Chad Smith – drums, percussion

Additional musicians

- Mauro Refosco – percussion (2011–14)
- Chris Warren – keyboards, electronic percussion pad (2011–17)
- Nate Walcott – piano, keyboards (2016–17)
- Samuel Bañuelos III – bass (on "Go Robot") (2016–17)
- Everly Bear Kiedis – vocals (on "Dreams of a Samuari (10/10/16) and "Go Robot" (2/12/17))
- Babymetal – vocals (on "Nobody Weird Like Me" (12/14/16))
- George Porter Jr. (The Meters) – bass (on "Give It Away" (1/10/17))
- Ivan Neville (Dumpstaphunk) – keyboards (on "Give It Away" (1/10/17))
- Trombone Shorty (Trombone Shorty and Orleans Avenue) – trombone (on "Give It Away" (1/10/17))
- The Rebirth Brass Band – brass instruments (on "Give It Away" (1/10/17))
