= Dolores Prida =

American dramatist

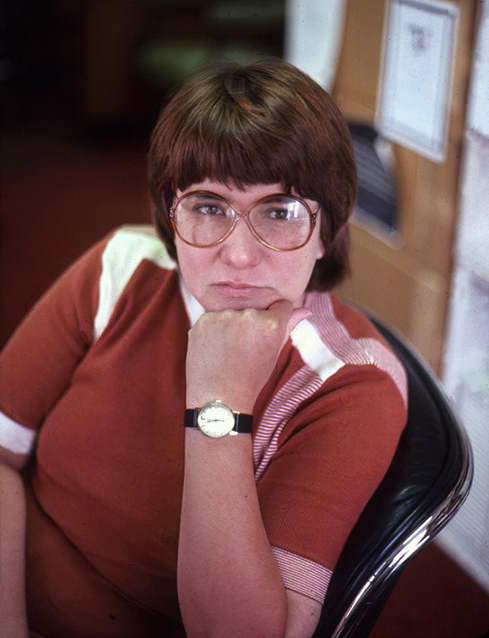
Prida in her office at Nuestro magazine in 1977.

Dolores Prida (September 5, 1943 – January 20, 2013) was a Cuban-American columnist and playwright. Catherine E. Shoichet of CNN said that she was a "Latina Dear Abby".

She wrote for a weekly column of the El Diario La Prensa. She also contributed to Latina magazine and the New York Daily News. At Latina she wrote her "Dolores Dice" ("Dolores says" in Spanish) column. Prida was a founding member of the Latina magazine.

== History ==
Prida was born on September 5, 1943, in Caibarién, Cuba. She was the oldest of three children. She had two sisters, Lourdes and Maria. Though she showed no prior interest in theater, Prida did have an eye for literature as she often wrote poetry and short stories as a teenager. Shortly after the completion of the Cuban Revolution, her father left for the United States, fleeing in a boat. In 1961, two years after the departure of their father, Prida and her mother and two siblings left Cuba. The family settled in New York City, where Prida would end up spending the rest of her life, and where she was first exposed to the theater.

She began learning the inner workings of the theater and production in 1976, her first experience having been working with the Teatro de Orilla on the Lower East Side. She wrote her first play the following year and went on to work with other collectives such as DUO, INTAR, the Puerto Rican Traveling Theater, and Repertorio Español.

== Education and Career ==
Prida attended Hunter College, where she studied Latin American Literature, taking night classes while working at a bakery. It was here where she also took her first drama classes. Prida never completed her college career before entering the publishing industry and becoming a journalist, working for Schraffts Restaurants as their company magazine editor. It was during this time in 1967, that Prida published her first written work, a poetry book titled, "Treinta y un poemas."

Two years later, she quit her job at Schraffts and was hired as a temporary foreign correspondent for Collier-MacMillan International Publishing Company. Prida then entered a period from the 1970s to the 1980s where she worked a string of temporary jobs in writing:

- Assistant editor, Simon & Schuster, "International Dictionary" (1970 - 1971)
- Director of Information Services, National Puerto Rican Forum (1971 - 1973)
- Managing Editor, El Tiempo Magazine (1973 - 1974)
- New York Correspondent, Visión Magazine (1975 - 1976)
- Senior Editor of Nuestro Magazine (1977 - 1980)
- Literary Manager, International Arts Relations (INTAR) (1980 - 1983)
- Director of Publications, Association of Hispanic Arts (AHA) (1983 - unknown)
- Advice Column Writer, Latina Magazine (1998 - unknown)

While these jobs short, they were pivotal to her skills as a bilingual writer, which she frequently exercised. During this time, Prida wrote a majority of her plays.

== Works ==
Plays

- Beautiful Señoritas (1977), is a one act play that was made to critique traditional gender roles and the cultural expectations placed on Latina women. The play explores themes such as sexism, and cultural stereotypes all while examining how these dynamics intersect with Latina identity.
- Beggars Soap Opera (1979)
- Coser y Cantar (1981) is a play by that explores the inner conflict faced by Latina woman, shown with two characters Ella and She. These two personas often clash at multiple times as they confront cultural expectations, and their personal identity. This play often plays on the fact of the mixture of the farce and realism. This is considered her best known one act plays.
- Pantallas (1986) is a satirical play about Elena a telenovela actor, and Roberto another actor, who face their disillusionment about soap operas. The play centers around a love triangle and criticizing of their profession. The characters often critique the formulaic nature of telenovelas and the emptiness that can come with success.
- Botánica (1991) is a play set in a Puerto Rican botanica in New York City's . The story revolves around the widowed owner of the botanica, and her daughter Anamu, and Anamu's daughter Milagros, who has just graduated from college. The play explores themes of family dynamics, tradition, spirituality and materialism.
- Savings (1985) is a comedic musical set in a neighborhood savings bank, where a group of customers and employees talk about their lives. Through the music the play explores the general themes of gentrification, cultural identity, and characters going through their evolving neighborhood. Having a clash between the themes of keeping tradition and progress.
- Casa Propia (1999, means "A House of Her Own")
- Four Guys Named José... and Una Mujer Named Maria (2000, "una mujer" means "a woman")
- Hola Ola!: A Musical
- L.I.P.S (Latinas in Power... Sort Of)
- Patos
- The Saxophone Man
- The Electric Maraca

Poetry

- Treinta y un poemas (1967)

== Awards/Recognitions ==
- Cintas Fellowship Award for Literature (1976)
- Creative Artistic Public Service Award for Playwriting (1976)
- CAPS Fellowship for Playwriting (1979)
- INTAR/Ford Foundation Playwright in Residence (1982)
- Excellence in Arts Award (1987)
- Doctor of Humane Letters, honorary degree from Mount Holyoke College (1989)
- Excellence in Arts Award (1990)
- Lila Wallace-Reader's Digest Foundation Grant (1991)

== Reception ==
In The New York Times, D. J. R. Buckner said that in Casa Propia, "[n]ot much more is needed for comedy than throwing these broadly drawn strong characters together" and that in regards to the characters, "Fanny, Olga, Manolo and Junior are likely to live with you for a long time." He said that Prida "has a good ear for New York Hispanic street language, and this cast exploits it so hilariously that at times even a viewer with no Spanish may want to set aside the simultaneous translation earphones and take it in raw: the grimaces and gestures reveal what is meant, and the sound is too good to miss."

== Death ==
She died on the morning of January 20, 2013, at Mount Sinai Hospital in New York City, at the age of 69. Her cause of death is not yet known, and her family placed a request for an autopsy.
