= This Is the Show =

Studio album by Pluralone
- Released: March 17, 2022
- Recorded: 2021
- Studio: Now Space, Scarboro Sound, Palmquist Studios & EastWest Studios
- Length: 39:35
- Label: ORG Music
- Producer: Clint Walsh

Pluralone chronology
Mother Nature EP (2021)	This Is the Show (2022)	Under the Banner of Heaven (Original FX Limited Series Soundtrack) (2022)

Pluralone albums chronology
I Don't Feel Well (2020)	This Is the Show (2022)	A Drop in the Ocean (2026)

Singles from This Is the Show
- 1. "Claw Your Way Out" Released: January 26, 2022; 2. "Offend" Released: May 3, 2022; 3. "The Fight for the Soul" Released: July 21, 2022

This Is the Show is the third studio album from multi-instrumentalist and songwriter Josh Klinghoffer, under the pseudonym of Pluralone. The album was recorded in 2021 and was released on March 17, 2022. The album was produced by Dot Hacker member Clint Walsh, who also performs on the album, along with appearances from Eric Gardner (also from Dot Hacker) and Eric Avery from Jane's Addiction.

"Claw Your Way Out" was released as the first single on all digital platforms.

The album was released on vinyl (including a 500-copy limited edition clear colour record), CD and digitally.

== Background ==
In interviews, Klinghoffer said that he composed songs that would be part of his band Dot Hacker's fourth studio album. In 2021 the single "Divination" was released by the band, but the idea of the whole album did not happen and Klinghoffer began to work on the songs with his bandmate Clint Walsh to release as a Pluralone album.

The album touches themes from post-World War II tension to anxiety in contemporary times and interpersonal relations.

To celebrate the release of the album, on March 19 Klinghoffer and Walsh have a stripped-down live concert that was broadcast on the Moment House platform. An "after party" ticket was also available for Klinghoffer solo performance with songs on demand via Twitter, the setlist includes originals, b-sides and covers.

A music video was released for "Offend" directed by Stephi Duckula, about the video Klinghoffer says: "Once upon a time, this video we did looked rather like the future, I’m thinking I’d like to go back to that future and look around, for the one that lies ahead seems a bit scary".

== Outtakes ==
On March 24, a Listening Party of the album was held where Josh commented, via Twitter, curiosities about the recording process of the LP. There the name of two unreleased songs was known: "How Many More" and "Teetering", still unreleased.

== The "This Is The Show" Show ==
On April 3, Josh launched a podcast called The "This is the Show" Show in which he plays music by other artists, conducts interviews and shares demos, alternate mixes and rehearsals of Pluralone songs. To date it has 10 chapters available at thisistheshow.org.

Throughout the show they presented a demo version of "Offend", a vocal acoustic demo of "Elongate", an early version of "Can't Put the Bullet Back in the Gun", an acoustic demo of "Wait for Me" and a brief instrumental version of "The Fight for the Soul" presented as a "The This is the Show Show Theme Song".

== Track listing ==
All music is composed by Josh Klinghoffer.

Side A
No.	Title	Length
1.	"The Fight for the Soul"	4:59
2.	"Offend"	5:08
3.	"Claw Your Way Out"	3:01
4.	"Can't Put the Bullet Back in the Gun"	3:47
5.	"Any More Alone"	4:09

Side B
No.	Title	Length
6.	"Elongate"	3:52
7.	"Scape"	3:51
8.	"A War Within"	3:42
9.	"Wait for Me"	2:58
10.	"Life Kills"	4:08
Total length:		39:35

== Personnel ==
Performed by Josh Klinghoffer & Clint Walsh

- Eric Avery – Bass on tracks 3 and 5
- Eric Gardner – Drums on tracks 1, 3, 5 and 7, additional engineering
- Vanessa Freebairn-Smith – Cello on 10

== Production ==
- Kate Johnson - design
- Michael Craver – mixing
- Andrew Scheps – mixing on tracks 1, 2 and 4
