= A Drop in the Ocean (album) =

Studio album by Pluralone
- Released: June 12, 2026
- Recorded: 2022–2025
- Studio: Now Space & Palmquist Studios
- Length: 33:44
- Label: ORG Music
- Producer: Eric Palmquist

Pluralone chronology
Under the Banner of Heaven (Original FX Limited Series Soundtrack) (2022)	A Drop in the Ocean (2026)

Pluralone albums chronology
This Is the Show (2022)	A Drop in the Ocean (2026)	TBA (2026)

Singles from A Drop in the Ocean
- 1. "I Hope You Knew" Released: March 25, 2026; 2. "Peer Into Your Dreams" Released: April 8, 2026; 3. "Ranting And Raving" Released: May 12, 2026

A Drop in the Ocean is the fourth studio album from multi-instrumentalist and songwriter Josh Klinghoffer, under the pseudonym of Pluralone. The album was released June 12, 2026 on clear Ocean color vinyl, CD, and as an edition of 50 signed test pressing alongside artwork pieces by Josh.

This record is largely based in songwriting on acoustic guitar, although the first and last songs are piano-driven as with plenty of Josh's earlier albums. "Give" is a song which began in the 2000s and finally found its voice during production of this record.

The album was developed amidst/following Josh recording with both Iggy Pop & Elton John (in collaboration with Brandi Carlile), whom he has also performed with a few times along with former Red Hot Chili Peppers bandmate Chad Smith. Josh had also toured and written with Jane's Addiction & Pearl Jam during 2023–2024, the latter of which he has been a touring member since 2021.

== Track listing ==
All music is composed by Josh Klinghoffer.

Side A
No.	Title	Length
1.	"Feels Like I've Done Wrong"	3:46
2.	"Peer Into Your Dreams"	3:41
3.	"Too Much Time's Gone By"	3:25
4.	"Simple Action"	3:01
5.	"I Hope You Knew"	3:26

Side B
No.	Title	Length
6.	"I Don't Want To Let You Go"	3:42
7.	"Ranting And Raving"	3:22
8.	"Give"	4:15
9.	"Who What You"	2:57
10.	"Sadly"	2:09
Total length:		33:44

== Personnel ==
=== Performed by Josh Klinghoffer ===
vocals, acoustic & electric guitars, keyboards & piano, drums & percussion, Therevox

- Chelsea Hodson – vocals 4, 7, 8
- Eric Palmquist – recording, mixing, production
- Michael Craver – recording
- Dave Kutch – mastering
- Sophie Spare – management
- Mark Kates – management
- Emily Ulmer – photography
- Mitch Rossiter – design
