= How's Your Process? (Work) =

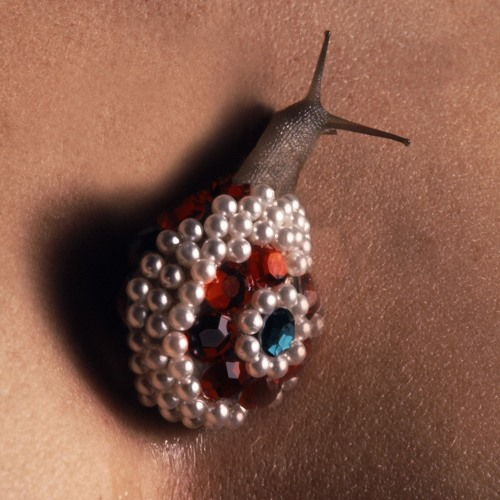

Studio album by Dot Hacker
- Released: July 1, 2014
- Recorded: 2012–2013 at Palmquist Studios in El Sereno, California
- Genre: Experimental Rock, Alternative rock
- Length: 31:17
- Label: Org Music, Smack Face Records
- Producer: Dot Hacker

Dot Hacker chronology
Inhibition (2012)	How's Your Process? (Work) (2014)	How's Your Process? (Play) (2014)

How's Your Process? (Work) is the second studio album by alternative rock band Dot Hacker and the first of a two-album series.

Guitarist Clint Walsh says: "We recorded a lot of songs over the last year with the intention of making a single full length album"..."We never actually expected that all of them would make the final sequence. However, we quickly realized there was nothing we felt should be left off."

The album was released on July 1, 2014, on Org Music label. It was dedicated "in memory of Dorothy Hacker (1920 – 2013)."

== Track listing ==
All tracks are written by Dot Hacker.

No.	Title	Length
1.	"Aim"	6:10
2.	"First in Forever"	6:07
3.	"Floating Up the Stairs"	5:55
4.	"Elevator"	3:58
5.	"Whatever You Want"	4:02
6.	"Sermon of Sorts"	5:45
Total length:		31:17

== Personnel ==
Dot Hacker

- Josh Klinghoffer – lead vocals, guitar, keyboards, synthesizers
- Clint Walsh – guitar, backing vocals, synthesizers
- Jonathan Hischke – bass guitar
- Eric Gardner – drums

Production

- Eric Palmquist – engineer, mixing
- Bernie Grundman – mastering

Artwork

- Ryszard Horowitz – cover photography
- Astrelle Johnquest – design
