= Dot Hacker (EP) =

EP by Dot Hacker
- Released: February 21, 2012
- Genre: Alternative rock
- Language: English
- Label: ORG Music

Dot Hacker chronology
Dot Hacker (2012)	Inhibition (2012)

Dot Hacker is the debut self-titled EP by alternative rock band Dot Hacker released in February 2012. The 4-track EP was followed by the release of their full-length debut album, Inhibition, later that year.

== Track listing ==
No.	Title	Length
1.	"Inhibition"	4:13
2.	"Order/Disorder"	3:57
3.	"Eye Opener"	5:24
4.	"Rewire"	3:52
