= How's Your Process? (Play) =

Studio album by Dot Hacker
- Released: October 7, 2014
- Recorded: 2012–2013 at Palmquist Studios in El Sereno, California
- Genre: Experimental Rock, Alternative rock
- Length: 31:36
- Label: Org Music
- Producer: Dot Hacker

Dot Hacker chronology
How's Your Process? (Work) (2014)	How's Your Process? (Play) (2014)	Nº3 (2017)

How's Your Process? (Play) is the second part of the second studio album by alternative rock band Dot Hacker and the second of a two-album series. The album was released on October 7, 2014 on Org Music label in digital, CD, cassette, and 12″ vinyl formats.

Josh Klinghoffer stated in an interview that How's Your Process was intended to be released as a single album, but was split into two when the band could not agree on which songs to include:

No one could agree on which songs to take off and no one could agree on what running order to put them [...] at some point John suggested we do two albums and break 'em up into two albums, six songs each [...] All the songs are so dense and there's lots of sounds to take it that it really made sense to give one group first and the second, a thirty minute record, a couple months later. They made us give them these parenthetical names, but they're really just two halves of the same record.

Klinghoffer also revealed that the cover is a photograph by Ryszard Horowitz, which the band discovered in an article from a 1969 issue of Esquire magazine.

== Track listing ==
All tracks are written by Dot Hacker.

No.	Title	Length
1.	"Slideclimb"	5:18
2.	"Somersault"	5:00
3.	"Memory"	6:01
4.	"Mission Creep"	5:32
5.	"Rest Assure"	4:18
6.	"Anger"	5:27
Total length:		31:36

== Personnel ==
Dot Hacker

- Josh Klinghoffer – lead vocals, guitar, keyboards, synthesizers
- Clint Walsh – guitar, backing vocals, synthesizers
- Jonathan Hischke – bass guitar
- Eric Gardner – drums

Additional musicians

- Vanessa Freebairn-Smith – string arrangements
- Sonus Quartet – strings

Production

- Eric Palmquist – engineer, mixing
- Bernie Grundman – mastering

Artwork

- Ryszard Horowitz – Photography
- Astrelle Johnquest – Design
