= Inhibition (album) =

Studio album by Dot Hacker
- Released: May 1, 2012
- Recorded: 2008–2009 in El Sereno, California
- Length: 51:20
- Label: ORG Music
- Producer: Dot Hacker and Adam Samuels

Dot Hacker chronology
Dot Hacker (EP) (2012)	Inhibition (2012)	How's Your Process? (Work) (2014)

Inhibition is the debut studio album by the American musical group Dot Hacker. The album was released on May 1, 2012 on ORG Music label. The recording of Inhibition was completed in 2009, however the release was delayed until 2012 due to band members' other commitments, notably Josh Klinghoffer who joined the Red Hot Chili Peppers.

== Track listing ==
All music is composed by Dot Hacker and Adam Samuels.

No.	Title	Length
1.	"Order/Disorder"	3:54
2.	"Idleidolidyl"	3:53
3.	"Eye Opener"	5:20
4.	"Discotheque"	5:11
5.	"Be Leaving"	5:04
6.	"The Earth Beneath"	6:11
7.	"Inhibition"	4:10
8.	"The Wit of the Staircase"	5:42
9.	"Quotes"	5:07
10.	"Puncture"	6:48
Total length:		51:20

Outtakes
No.	Title	Length
1.	"Rewire"	3:52
2.	"Neon Arrow"	6:56

== Personnel ==
Dot Hacker

- Josh Klinghoffer – lead vocals, guitar, keyboards, synthesizers
- Clint Walsh – guitar, backing vocals, synthesizers
- Jonathan Hischke – bass guitar
- Eric Gardner – drums

Production

- Chad Carlisle – Assistant engineer
- Bernie Grundman – mastering
- Adam Samuels – composer, engineer, mixing, producer
- Vanessa Price – artwork
- Jon Patrick Foshee - design
