= Dot Hacker =

American experimental rock band

- Origin: El Sereno, Los Angeles, California, U.S.
- Genres: Experimental rock, alternative rock
- Years active: 2008–present
- Label: Org Music
- Members: Josh Klinghoffer; Jonathan Hischke; Clint Walsh; Eric Gardner
- Website: Official Website

Dot Hacker is an American experimental rock band from California, formed in 2008. The band consists of Josh Klinghoffer (vocals, guitar, keyboards), Clint Walsh (guitar, keyboards, backing vocals), Jonathan Hischke (bass) and Eric Gardner (drums).

Klinghoffer, Walsh and Gardner were all previously members of the touring incarnation of Gnarls Barkley, and were subsequently joined by Hella bassist Jonathan Hischke to create Dot Hacker. Prior to Klinghoffer joining the Red Hot Chili Peppers, the band recorded its debut album, Inhibition, which was released on May 1, 2012.

== History ==
After meeting multi-instrumentalist Josh Klinghoffer through his Hella bandmates Spencer Seim and Dan Elkan, bassist Jonathan Hischke moved to Los Angeles, California, in 2008, to begin work on a potential project that would include Klinghoffer, and fellow Gnarls Barkley touring musicians, Clint Walsh and Eric Gardner. Regarding the band, Hischke noted,

"It’s this interesting thing, because it’s this band made of kind of young session musician types: Josh played with Beck, and PJ Harvey and John Frusciante, now he’s the new Chili Pepper. Then there’s Eric Gardner our drummer, he’s played with Charlotte Gainsbourg, Gnarls Barkley, you know, Tom Morello, stuff like that. Clint Walsh has done Gnarls, The Scream, Electric Guest, and many others. So they invited me in to jam with them and I moved to LA to pretty much do that."

Taking its name from drummer Eric Gardner's grandmother, Dot Hacker subsequently began recording its debut album in between the band members' other commitments. In October 2009, Klinghoffer joined the Red Hot Chili Peppers, delaying the album's release for an extended period of time. Regarding its eventual release, Hishcke noted, "This is quite a busy group of people, even more so now. We recorded off and on for many months in our really comfy and clubhouse-like home studio. Then the completed album was in purgatory for a while as we all did different things."

On February 21, 2012, the band released its debut EP, Dot Hacker on Org Music, with its full-length album Inhibition released on May 1, 2012. With Klinghoffer having a break from his Chili Peppers duties, June 2013 saw Dot Hacker performing in California and Las Vegas.

On 19 April 2014, the band released a single Whatever You Want B/W Memory for Record Store Day 2014, the single was only released on 7" vinyl. The A-side, Whatever You Want, was later included on How's Your Process (Work). The B-side, Memory, comes from How's Your Process (Play). 'How's Your Process? (Work)' was released on 1 July 2014, containing six songs. An album of equal length, 'How's Your Process? (Play)' was released on October 6, 2014. Dot Hacker played for the first time in 2014, debuting songs from the new album, at The chapel, San Francisco on 6 July 2014 and are due to play in Los Angeles on 8 August 2014.

The band announced plans to play Tokyo in February 2015 in support of the two albums. This will be their first time performing outside of the United States. It is unknown if more dates will be added as Klinghoffer began recording a new album with the Chili Peppers in January 2015 and following the album's release (which is expected to be summer 2016) the band will likely spend the next two years touring.

The band released their third album, titled "№3" on January 20, 2017. The band released the opening track, "C Section" on January 4, 2017.

In 2021, the band released two singles, "Divination" and "Neon Arrow / Rewire". "Divination" was written and recorded remotely during quarantine, while "Neon Arrow / Rewire" consists of tracks originating from the Inhibition sessions. "Rewire" was previously released on the band's self-titled debut EP, Dot Hacker.

In 2022, songs intended for the band's fourth album were released as Pluralone - "This Is The Show". Josh & Clint appear on every track, while Eric appears on 4 tracks.

== Band members ==
- Josh Klinghoffer – lead vocals, guitar, piano, keyboards, synthesizers
- Clint Walsh – guitar, keyboards, synthesizers, backing vocals
- Jonathan Hischke – bass guitar
- Eric Gardner – drums, percussion

== Discography ==
=== Albums ===
- Inhibition (2012)
- How's Your Process? (Work) (2014)
- How's Your Process? (Play) (2014)
- Nº3 (2017)

=== EPs ===
- Dot Hacker (2012)

=== Singles ===
- Whatever You Want b/w Memory (2014)
- Divination (2021)
- Neon Arrow b/w Rewire (2021)
